= Santiago =

Capital and largest city of Chile

- Capital city
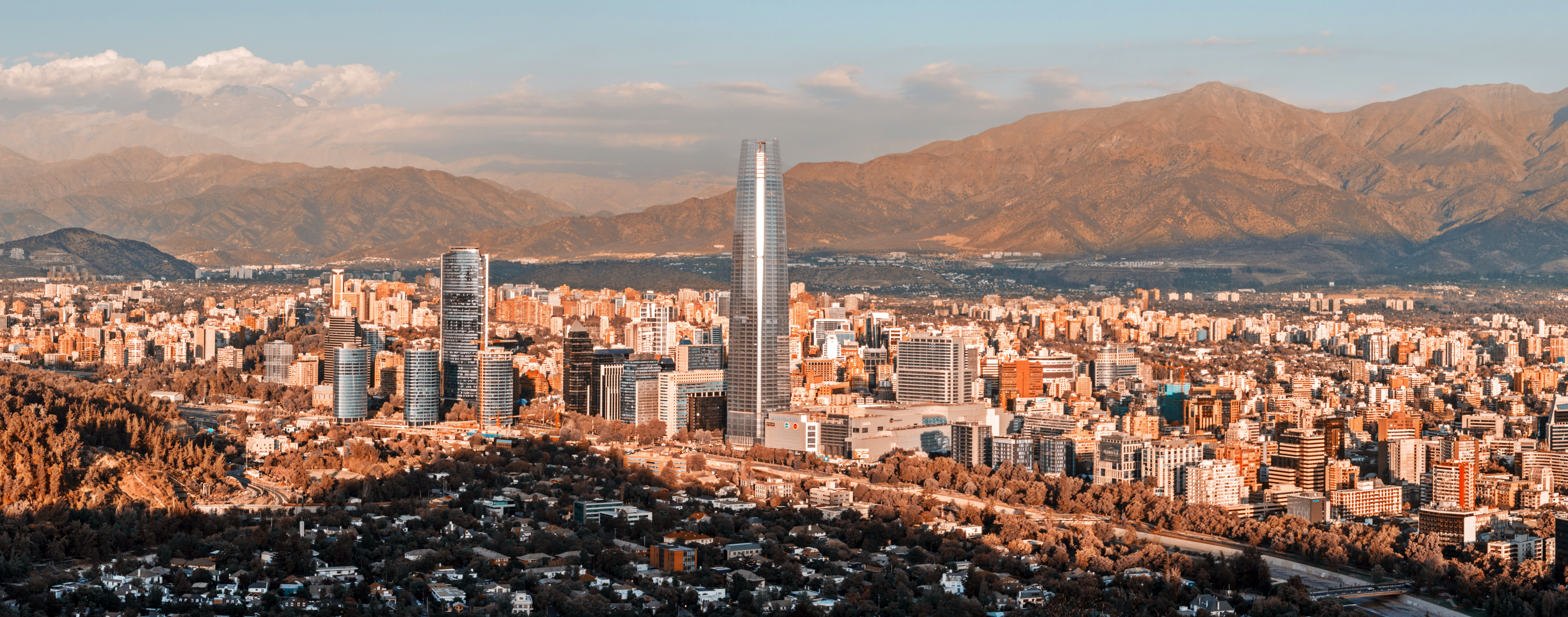
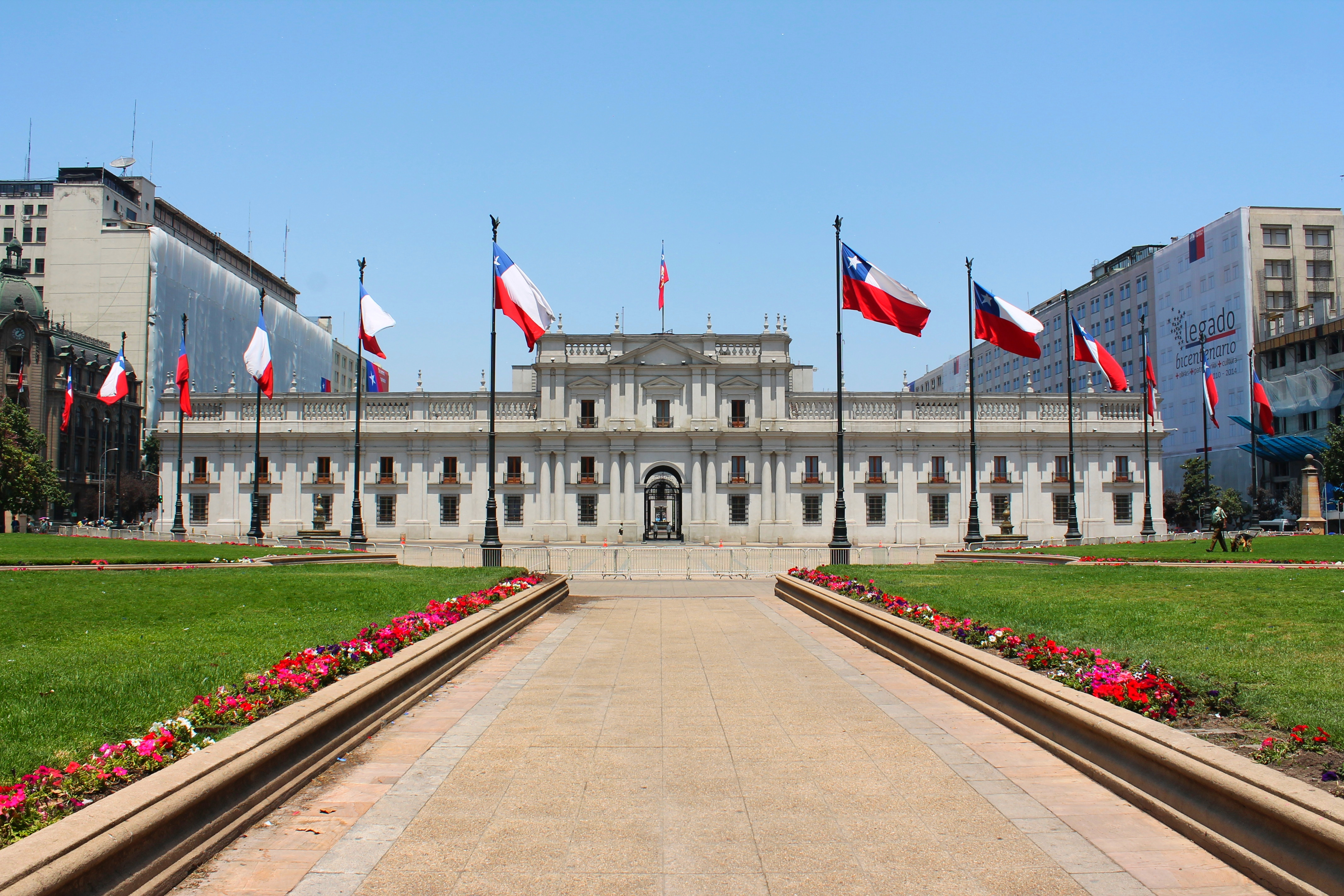
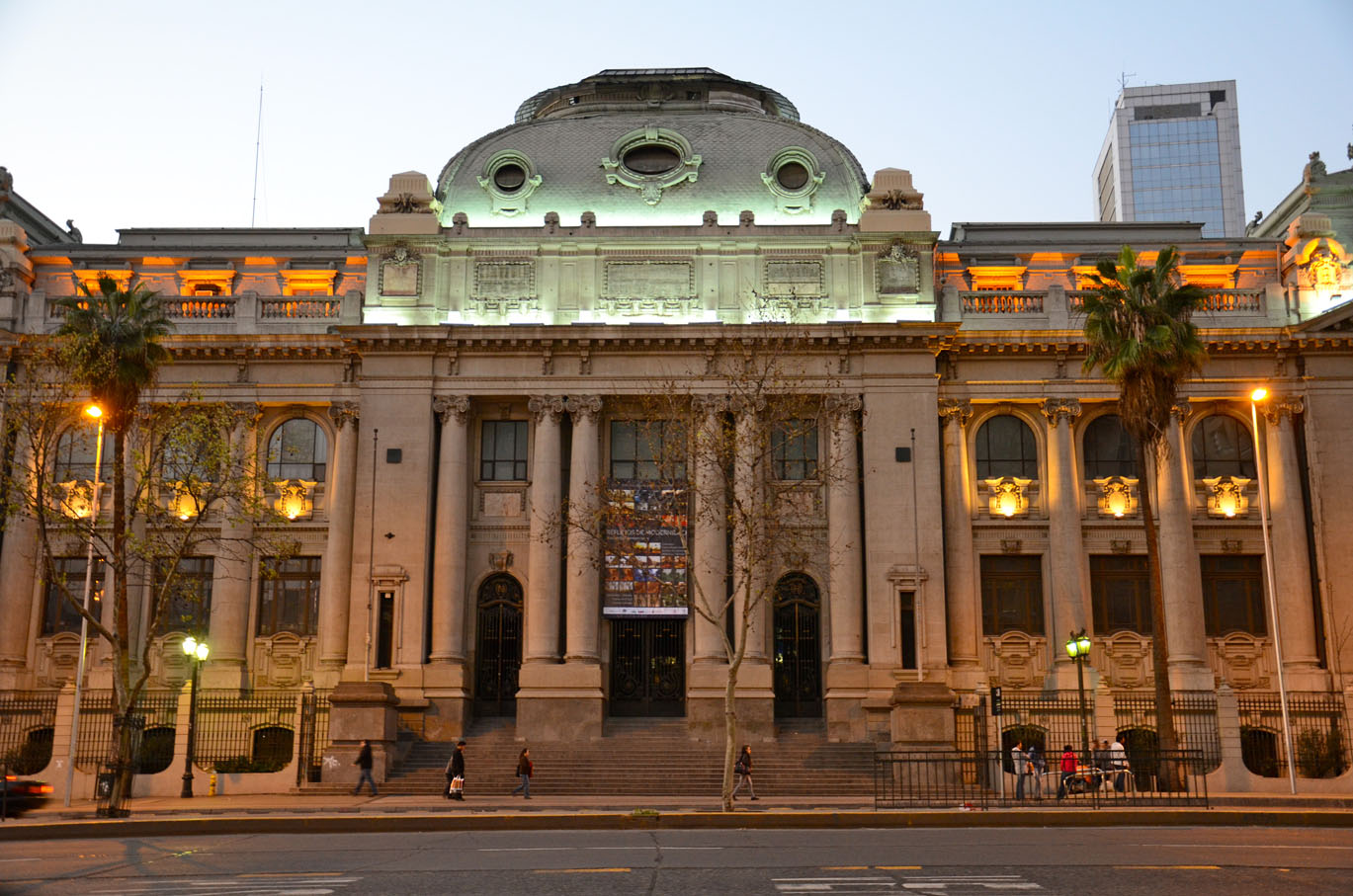
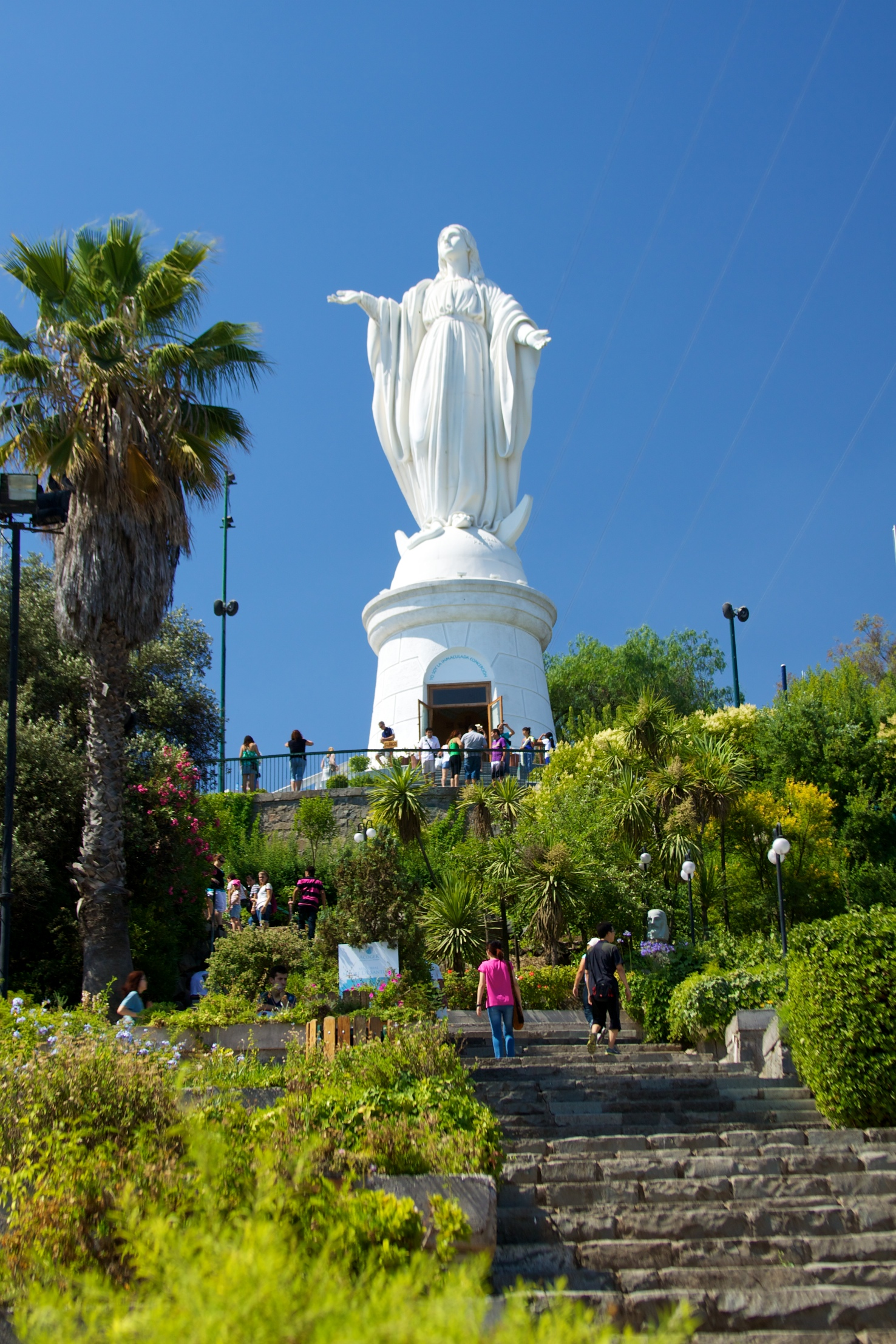
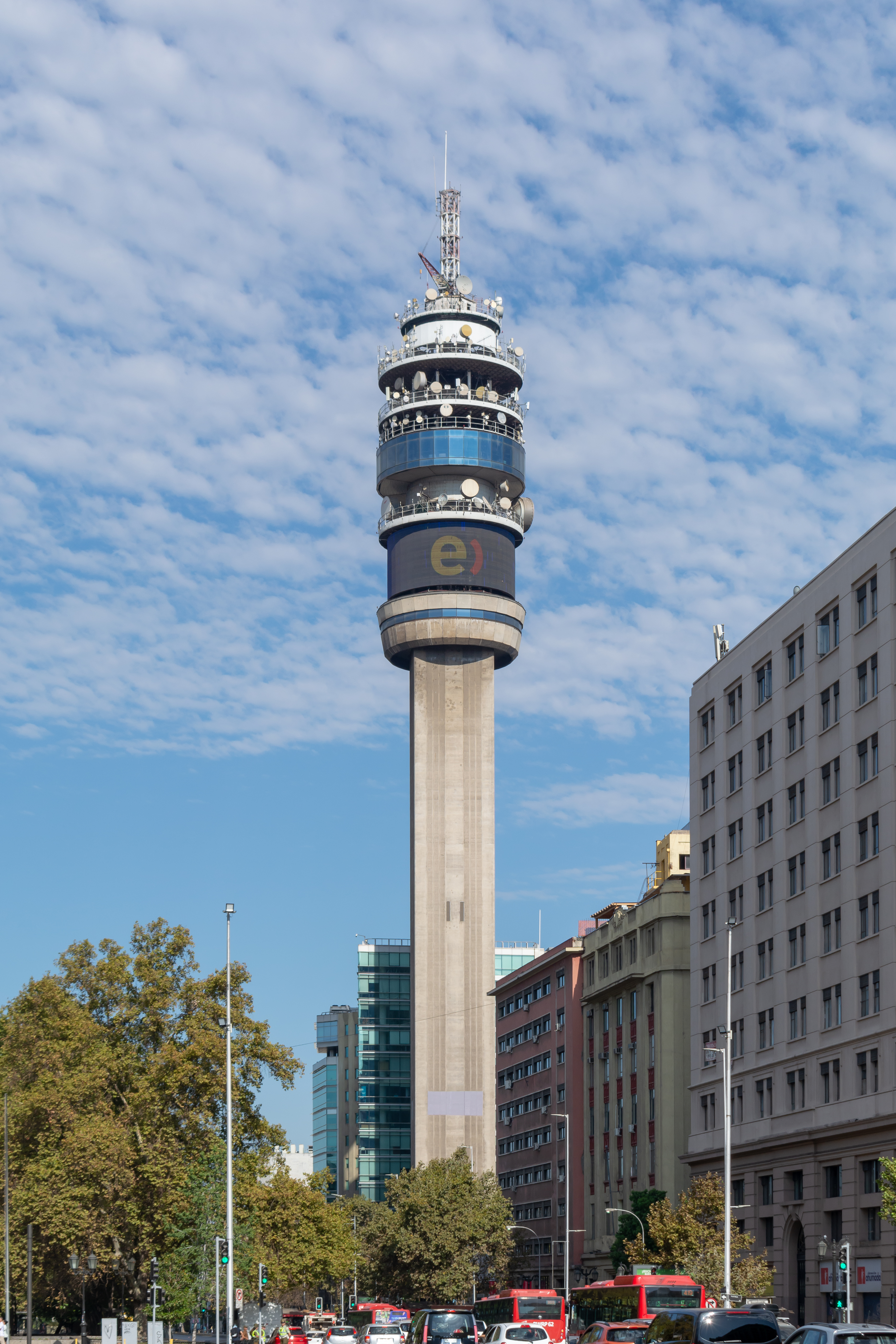
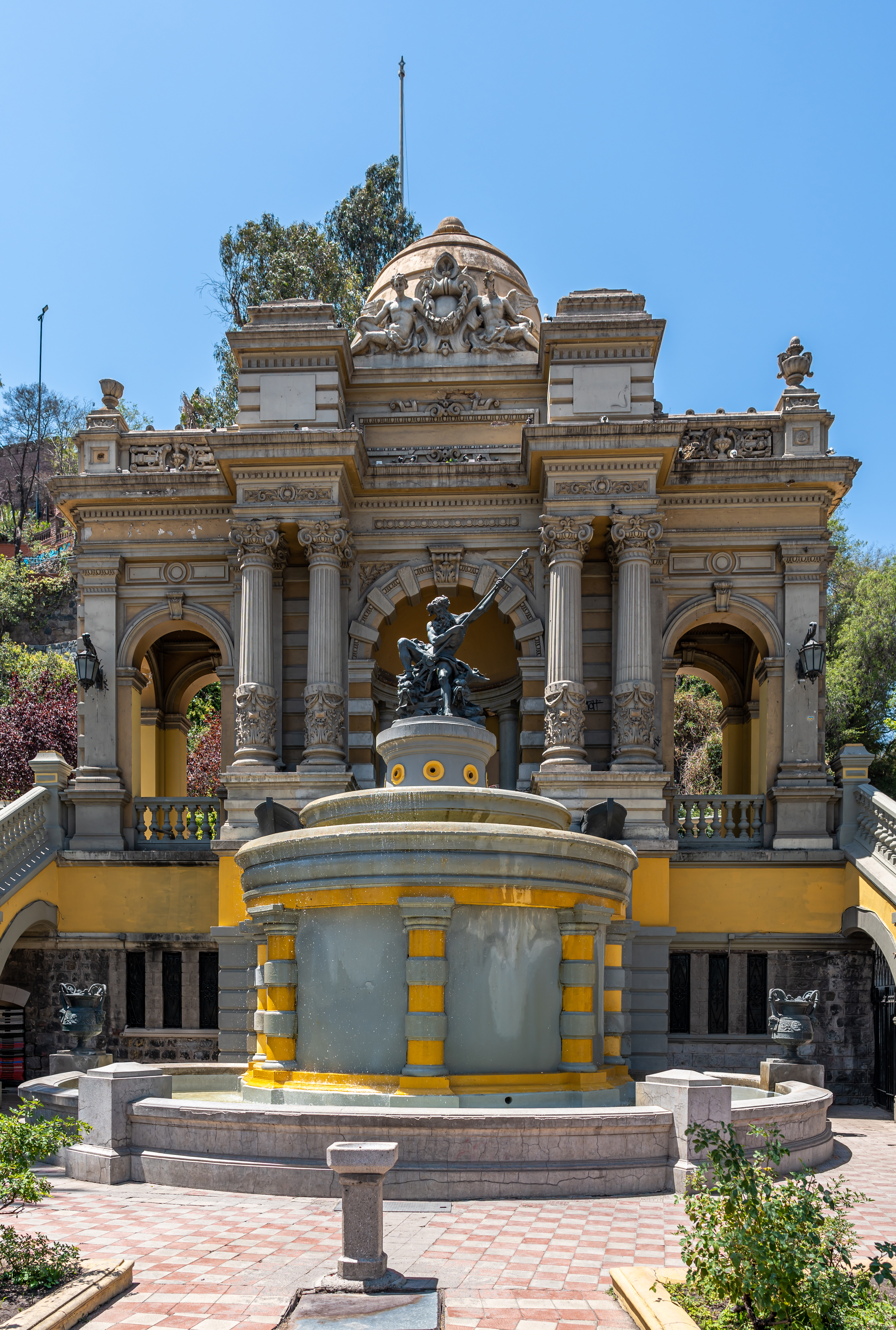
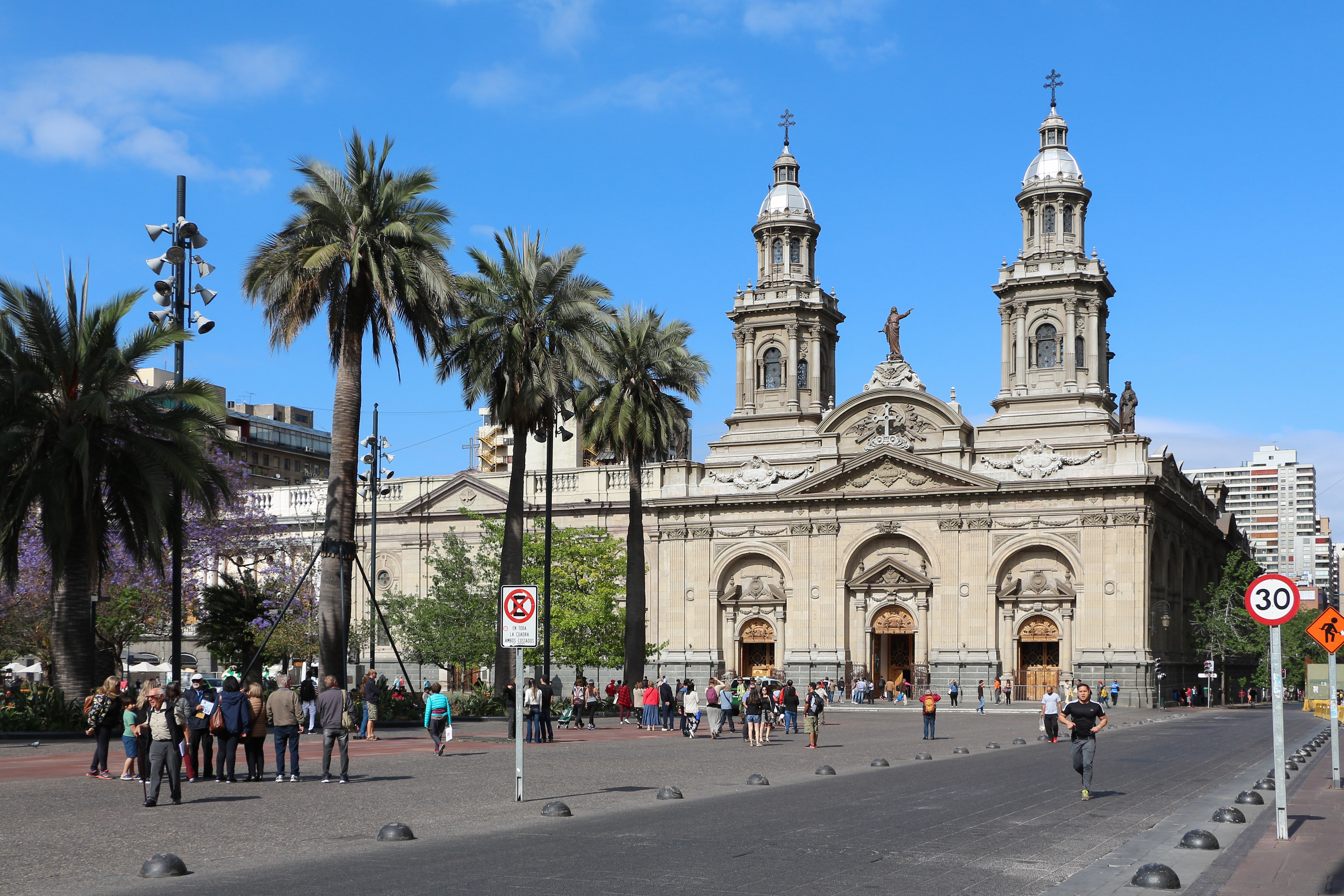
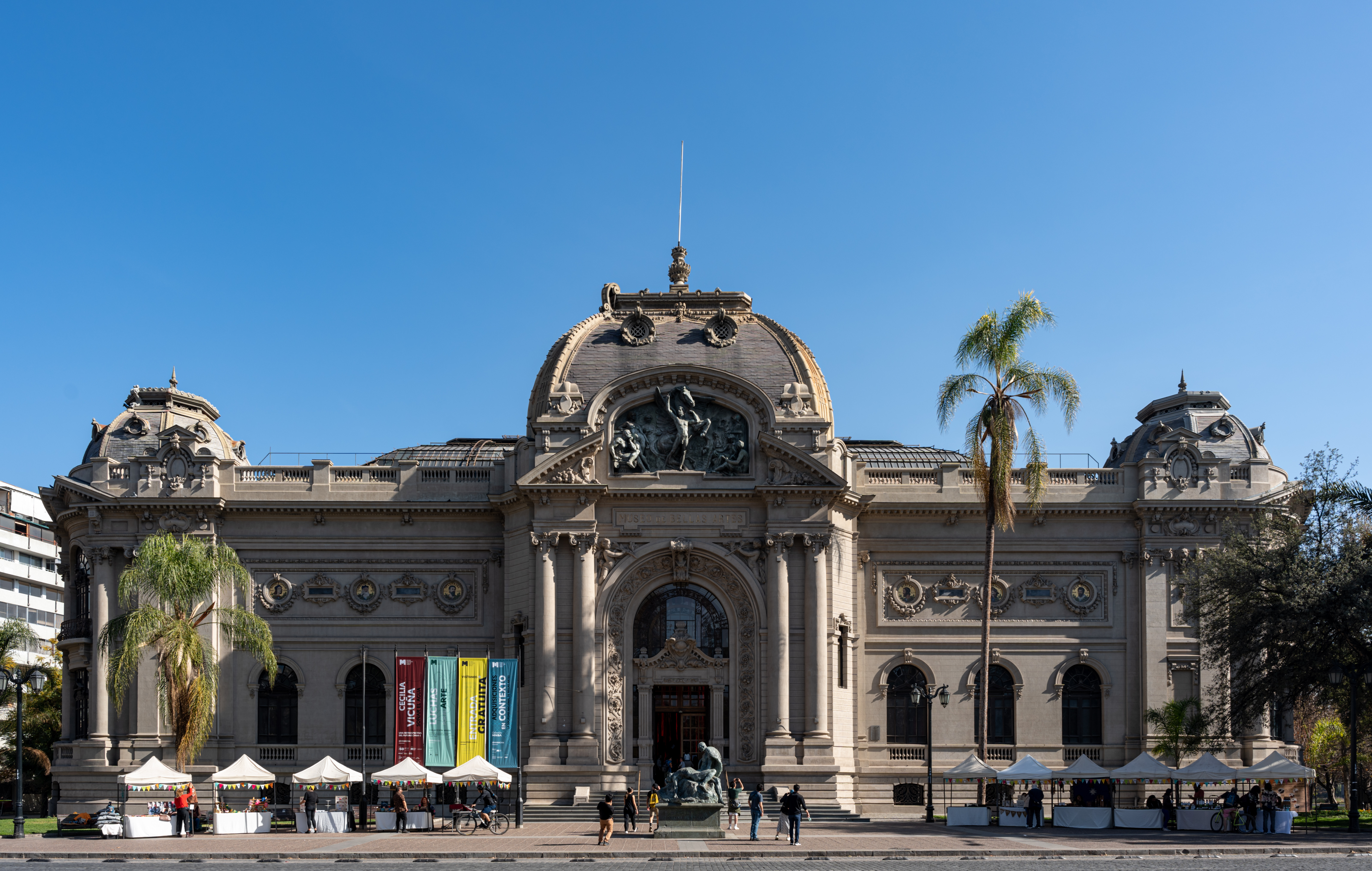
- Skyline of Santiago, with Sanhattan and Gran Torre Santiago, from San Cristóbal Hill La Moneda Palace National Library of Chile San Cristóbal Hill Torre Entel Santa Lucía Hill Metropolitan Cathedral of Santiago National Museum of Fine Arts

- Flag Coat of arms Location in Chile Santiago (South America)
- Nickname: "The City of the Island Hills"
- Interactive map of Santiago
- Coordinates: 33°26′15″S 70°39′00″W
- Country: Chile
- Region: Santiago Metropolitan
- Province: Santiago
- Foundation: 12 February 1541; 485 years ago
- Founder: Pedro de Valdivia
- Named for: Saint James

Area
  - Capital city: 641 km^{2} (247.6 sq mi)
- Elevation: 570 m (1,870 ft)

Population (2017)
  - Capital city: 6,269,384
  - Rank: 1st in Chile; 5th in South America
  - Density: 9,821/km^{2} (25,436/sq mi)
  - Metro: 6,903,479
- Demonym: Santiaguinos (-as)

GDP
  - Capital city: US$117.1 billion (2023)
  - Per capita: US$17,000 (2023)
- Time zone: UTC−04:00 (CLT)
  - Summer (DST): UTC−03:00 (CLST)
- Postal code: 8320000
- Area code: +56 2
- HDI (2023): 0.908(1st) – very high
- Website: www.gobiernosantiago.cl

Santiago (/ˌsæntiˈɑːɡoʊ/ SAN-tee-AH-goh, US also /ˌsɑːn-/ SAHN-; Spanish: [sanˈtjaɣo]), also known as Santiago de Chile (Spanish: [sanˈtjaɣo ðe ˈtʃile]), is the capital and largest city of Chile and one of the largest cities in the Americas. Located in the Chilean Central Valley within the Santiago Basin, between the Andes to the east and the Chilean Coastal Range to the west, it anchors the Santiago Metropolitan Region and its conurbation of Greater Santiago, which comprises more than forty communes and concentrates over a third of the national population and around 45% of Chile's GDP. Most of the city lies between 500 and 650 meters (1,640 and 2,130 ft) above sea level, with recent urban growth extending into the Andean foothills.

The basin that Santiago occupies has been inhabited since at least the 10th millennium BC, with early agricultural villages established along the Mapocho River and later incorporated into the Inca sphere of influence. During the Spanish invasion of the Americas, conquistador Pedro de Valdivia founded the colonial city of Santiago del Nuevo Extremo on 12 February 1541, laying out a grid plan around the Plaza Mayor (now Plaza de Armas). Despite early food shortages, Indigenous attacks, floods, and devastating earthquakes—notably in 1647—the city consolidated as the capital of the Captaincy General of Chile. Santiago remained the political center during the Chilean War of Independence, beginning with the First Government Junta in 1810 and culminating in patriot victory at the Battle of Maipú in 1818, and subsequently expanded through 19th-century railway construction, state-building projects, and the creation of major educational and cultural institutions.

The city today is the political and administrative heart of Chile: it houses the presidential palace and the main organs of the executive and judiciary, while the National Congress meets primarily in nearby Valparaíso. Economically, Santiago is the country's principal industrial, commercial, and financial hub and a regional center for services, hosting the headquarters of major Chilean companies, regional offices of international organizations such as the Economic Commission for Latin America and the Caribbean (ECLAC), and several of the nation's leading universities and research institutes. Urban growth has been marked by the emergence of high-rise business districts such as Sanhattan, dominated by Gran Torre Santiago, the tallest building in South America and the second tallest building in Latin America (behind Mexico's T.Op Torre 1).

Santiago's urban landscape combines a 19th-century neoclassical core and surviving colonial churches with extensive modern residential districts, standalone hills such as Cerro Santa Lucía and Cerro San Cristóbal, and parklands along the Mapocho River, including Parque Forestal, Bicentennial Park, and Santiago Metropolitan Park. The city has a cool semi-arid climate with Mediterranean characteristics, warm, dry summers and cool, wetter winters; its location in an enclosed valley contributes both to its scenic views of the high Andes and to chronic air pollution and winter smog. Santiago is served by Arturo Merino Benítez International Airport, a dense network of urban highways, and one of Latin America's most extensive metro systems.

== Etymology ==
The name "Santiago" was chosen by the Spanish conqueror Pedro de Valdivia when he founded the city in 1541 as "Santiago del Nuevo Extremo", in reference to his home region of Extremadura and as a tribute to James the Great, the patron saint of Spain. The saint's name appears in various forms in Spanish, such as Diego, Jaime, Jacobo, or Santiago, with the latter derived from the Galician evolution of Vulgar Latin Sanctu Iacobu. Allegedly, there was no indigenous name for the area where Santiago is located, but the Mapuche language uses the adapted name Santiaw.

In Chile, several entities share the name "Santiago", which can often lead to confusion. The commune of Santiago, also referred to as Santiago Centro, is an administrative division encompassing the area occupied by the city during colonial times. It is governed by the Municipality of Santiago and led by a mayor. This commune is part of Santiago Province, which is headed by a provincial delegate appointed by the President of the Republic, and it is also part of the Santiago Metropolitan Region, governed by a popularly elected governor.

When the term "Santiago" is used without further clarification, it typically refers to Gran Santiago ('Greater Santiago'), the metropolitan area characterized by continuous urban development. This area includes the commune of Santiago and over 40 other communes, encompassing much of Santiago Province and parts of neighboring provinces. The definition of the metropolitan area has evolved over time as the city has expanded, incorporating smaller cities and rural areas.

Residents of the city and region are referred to as santiaguinos (for males) and santiaguinas (for females).

== History ==
=== Prehistory ===
Archaeological evidence suggests that the first human groups arrived in the Santiago basin around the 10th millennium BC. These groups were primarily nomadic hunter-gatherers, traveling from the coast to the interior to hunt guanacos during the Andean snowmelt. By around 800 AD, the first permanent settlers established agricultural communities along the Mapocho River, where they cultivated crops such as maize, potatoes, and beans, and domesticated camelids.

The villages of the Picunche people (as they were known to Chileans) or the Promaucae (as referred to by the Incas) were under Inca rule from the late 15th century to the early 16th century. The Incas established a settlement of mitimas in the valley, located in the center of present-day Santiago, with fortifications such as Huaca de Chena and the El Plomo hill sanctuary. According to Chilean historian Armando de Ramón, the area served as a base for failed Inca expeditions to the south and was a junction along the Inca Trail.

=== Founding of the city ===
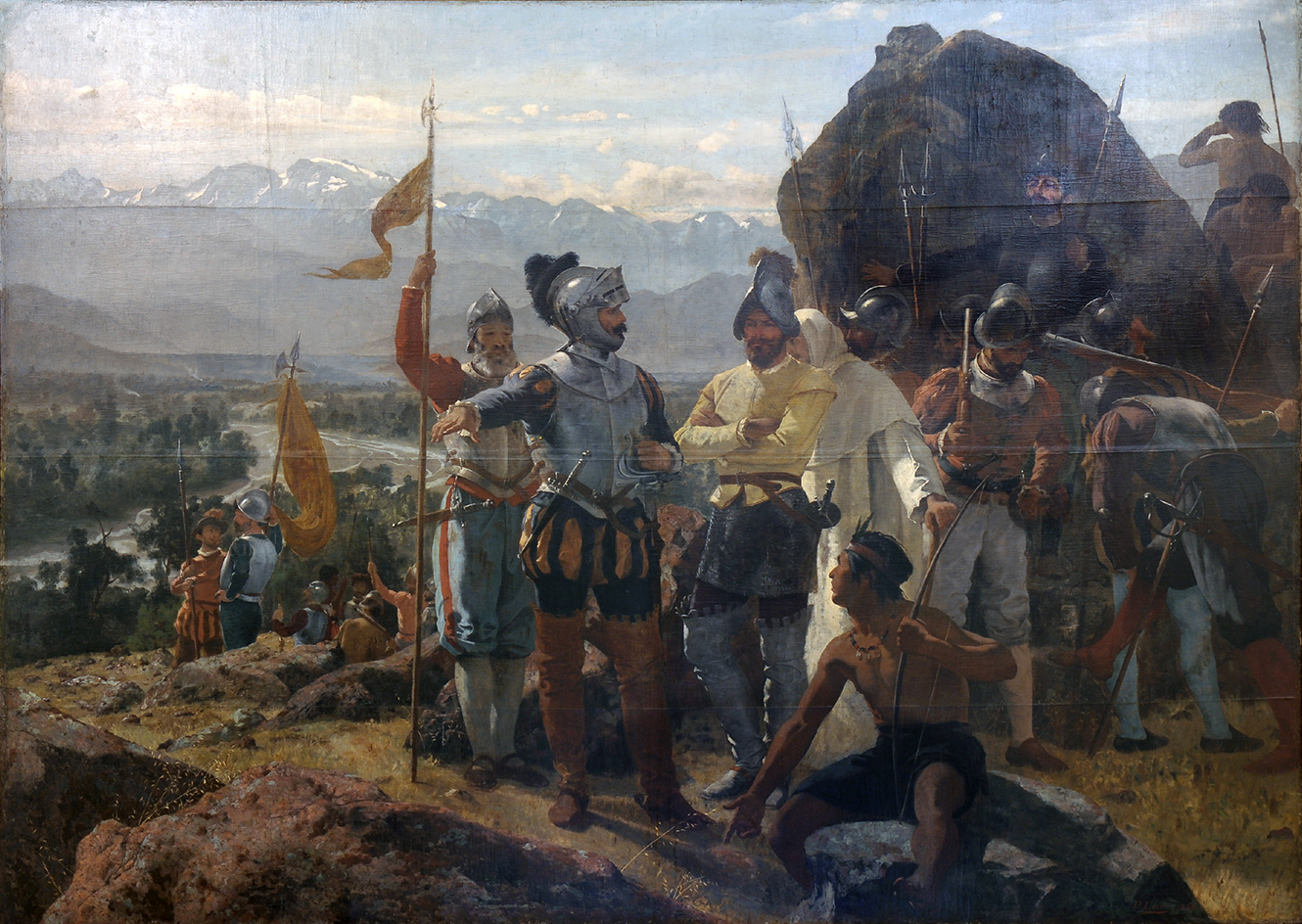
The Founding of Santiago (1888), oil painting by Pedro Lira (1888). The artwork depicts Pedro de Valdivia and Juan Martín de Candia, proclaiming the founding of the city.

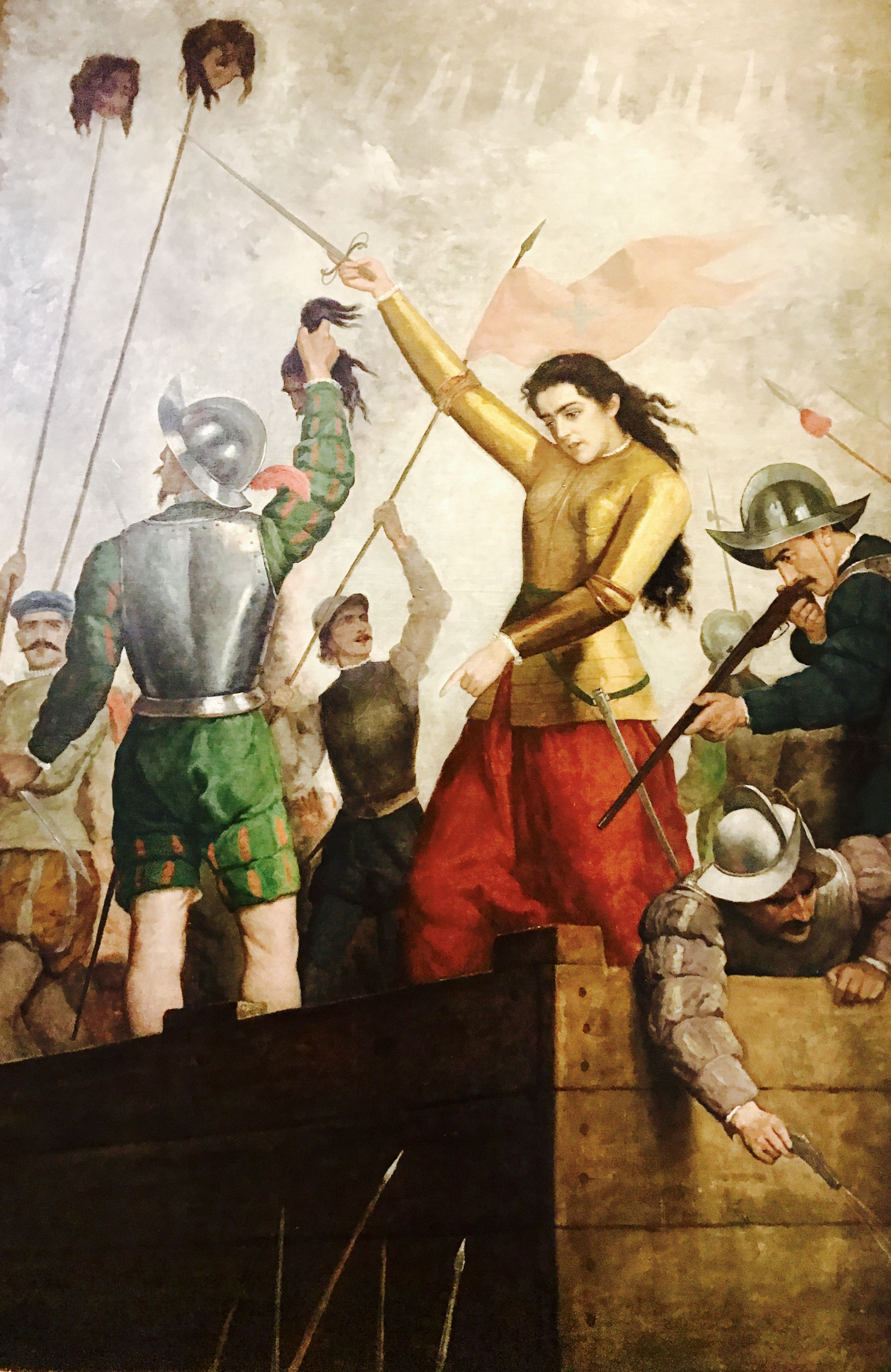
Inés de Suárez in Defense of the City of Santiago (1897), oil painting by José Mercedes Ortega.

Pedro de Valdivia, a conquistador from Extremadura sent by Francisco Pizarro from Peru, arrived in the Mapocho valley on 13 December 1540, after a long journey from Cusco. Valdivia and his party camped by the river on the slopes of the Tupahue hill and gradually began interacting with the Picunche people who lived in the area. Valdivia later called a meeting with the local chiefs, during which he explained his plan to establish a city on behalf of Charles I of Spain. The city would serve as the capital of his governorship of Nueva Extremadura.

On 12 February 1541, Valdivia officially founded the city of Santiago del Nuevo Extremo ('Santiago of New Extremadura') in honor of the Apostle James, the patron saint of Spain. The city was established near Huelén, which Valdivia renamed Santa Lucía. He assigned the city's layout to master builder Pedro de Gamboa, who designed a grid plan. At its center, Gamboa placed a Plaza Mayor, which became the town's central hub. Surrounding the plaza, plots were designated for the cathedral, the jail, and the governor's house. The city was divided into eight blocks from north to south and ten blocks from east to west, between the Mapocho River and the Cañada with each quarter-block, or solar, granted to settlers. The colonial architecture following the grid plan consisted of one or two-story houses, adobe walls, tile roofs, and rooms around interior corridors and patios.

Valdivia left for the south with his troops months later, initiating the Arauco War. Santiago was left vulnerable, and a coalition of Mapuche and Picunche tribes led by chief Michimalonco destroyed the city on 11 September 1541, despite the efforts of a Spanish garrison of 55 soldiers defending the fort. The defense was led by Spanish Conquistadora Inés de Suárez. When she realized they were being overpowered, she ordered the execution of all indigenous prisoners, displaying their heads on pikes and throwing some towards the attackers. In response to this brutal act, the indigenous forces dispersed in fear. The city was gradually rebuilt, with the newly established city of Concepción gaining political prominence as the Royal Audiencia of Chile was established there in 1565. However, the ongoing threat of the Arauco War and frequent earthquakes delayed the establishment of the Royal Court in Santiago until 1607, which solidified the city's status as the capital.

During the early years of the city, the Spanish suffered from severe shortages of food and other supplies. The Picunches had adopted a strategy of halting cultivation and retreating to more remote locations, which isolated the Spanish and forced them to resort to eating whatever they could find. The shortage of clothing meant that some Spanish had to dress with hides from dogs, cats, sea lions, and foxes.

=== Colonial Santiago ===
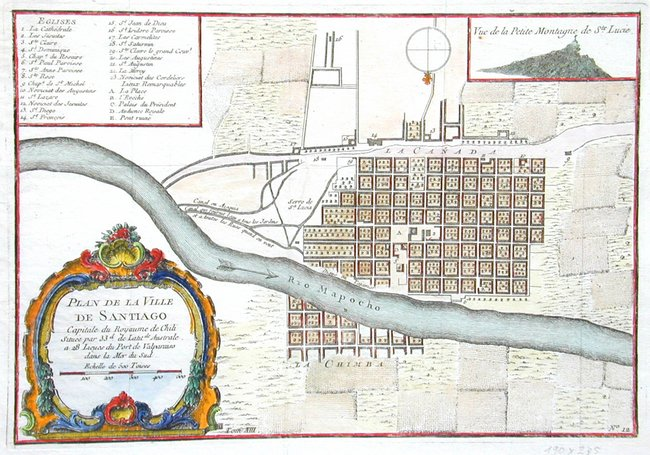
Map of colonial Santiago in 1712 by Frézier and Bellin.

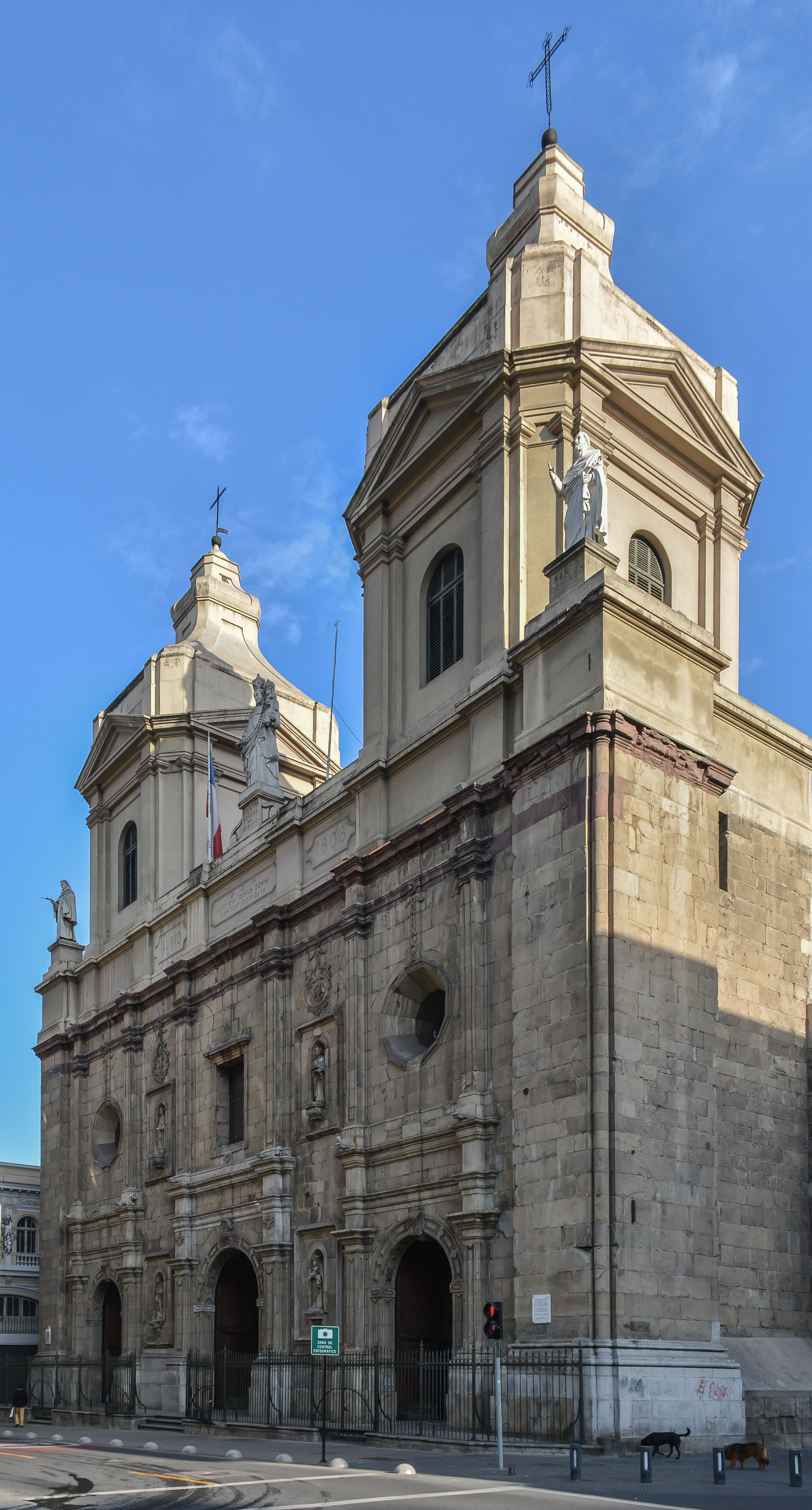
Preserved colonial Church of Santo Domingo, built between 1747 and 1796.

Although Santiago was facing the threat of permanent destruction early on, due to attacks from indigenous peoples, earthquakes, and floods, the city began to grow rapidly. Out of the 126 blocks designed by Pedro de Gamboa in 1558, 40 were occupied. In 1580, the first major buildings in the city started to be erected, marked by the placement of the foundation stone of the first Cathedral in 1561 and the building of the church of San Francisco in 1572. Both of these structures were primarily made of adobe and stone. In addition to the construction of significant buildings, the city began to thrive as the surrounding areas welcomed tens of thousands of livestock.

During the 16th and 17th centuries, the growth of the city was hindered by a series of disasters including an earthquake, a smallpox epidemic in 1575, the Mapocho River floods in 1590, 1608, and 1618, and a devastating earthquake on 13 May 1647 which resulted in the death of over 600 people and affected over 5,000 others. Despite these setbacks, the capital of the Captaincy General of Chile continued to grow, with all the power of the country being centered on the Plaza de Armas in Santiago.

In 1767, the corregidor Luis Manuel de Zañartu launched one of the most significant architectural projects of the colonial period, the Calicanto Bridge, connecting the city to La Chimba on the north side of the Mapocho River. He also began constructing embankments to prevent river overflows. Although the bridge was completed, its piers were frequently damaged by the river. In 1780, Governor Agustín de Jáuregui hired the Italian architect Joaquín Toesca, who designed several important buildings, including the cathedral's façade, the Palacio de La Moneda, the San Carlos Canal, and the completion of the embankments during the government of Ambrosio O'Higgins. These works were officially opened in 1798. The O'Higgins government also opened the road to Valparaíso in 1791, connecting the capital with the country's main port.

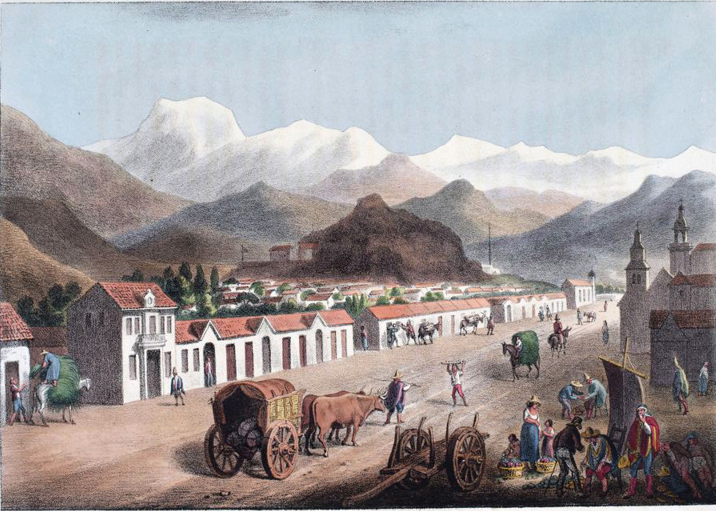
The colonial La Cañada neighborhood in Santiago de Chile, in 1821, by Scharf and Schmidtmeyer. John Carter Brown Library.

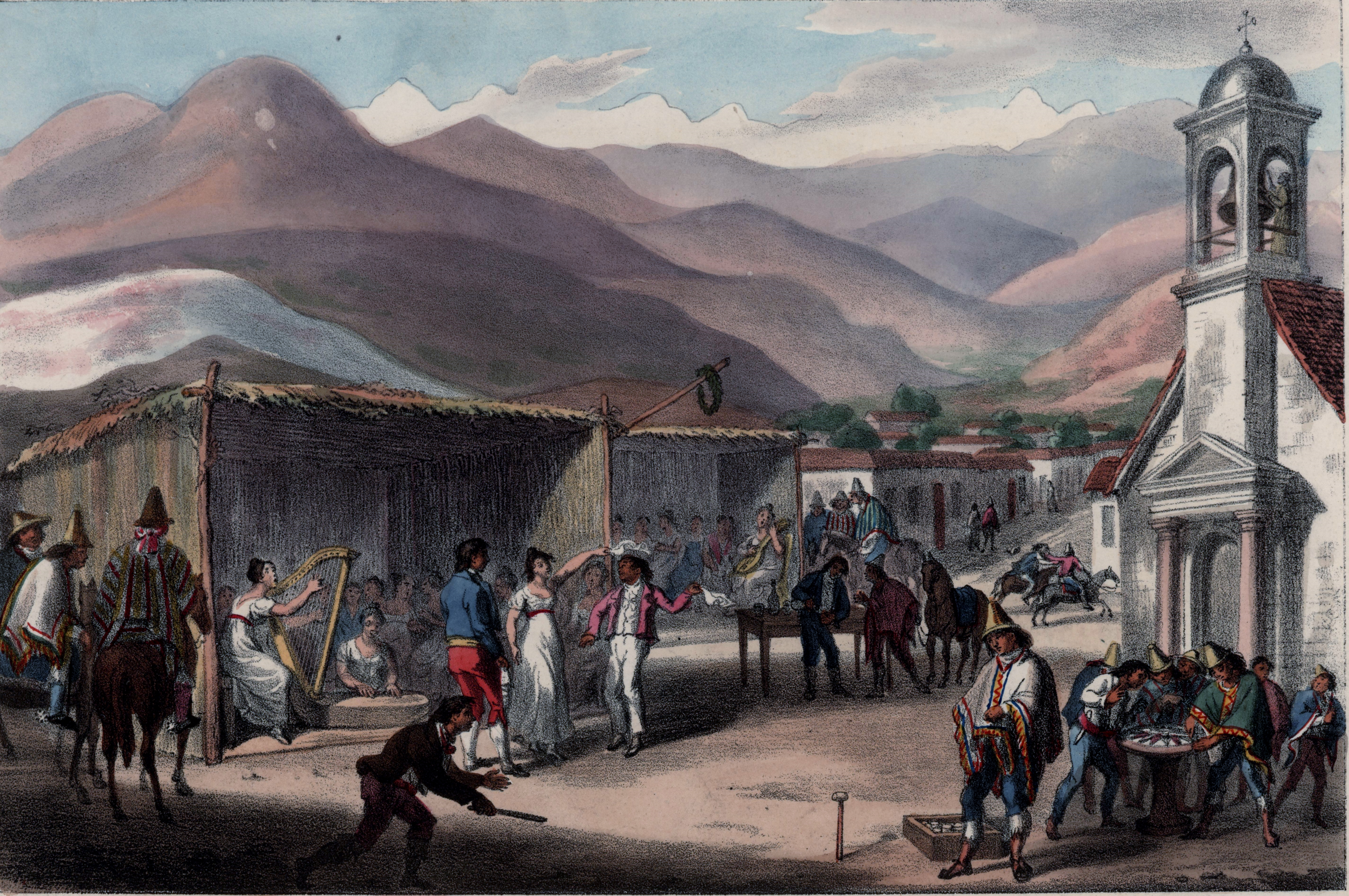
Scenes at a fair in Santiago de Chile, in 1821, by Scharf and Schmidtmeyer. John Carter Brown Library.

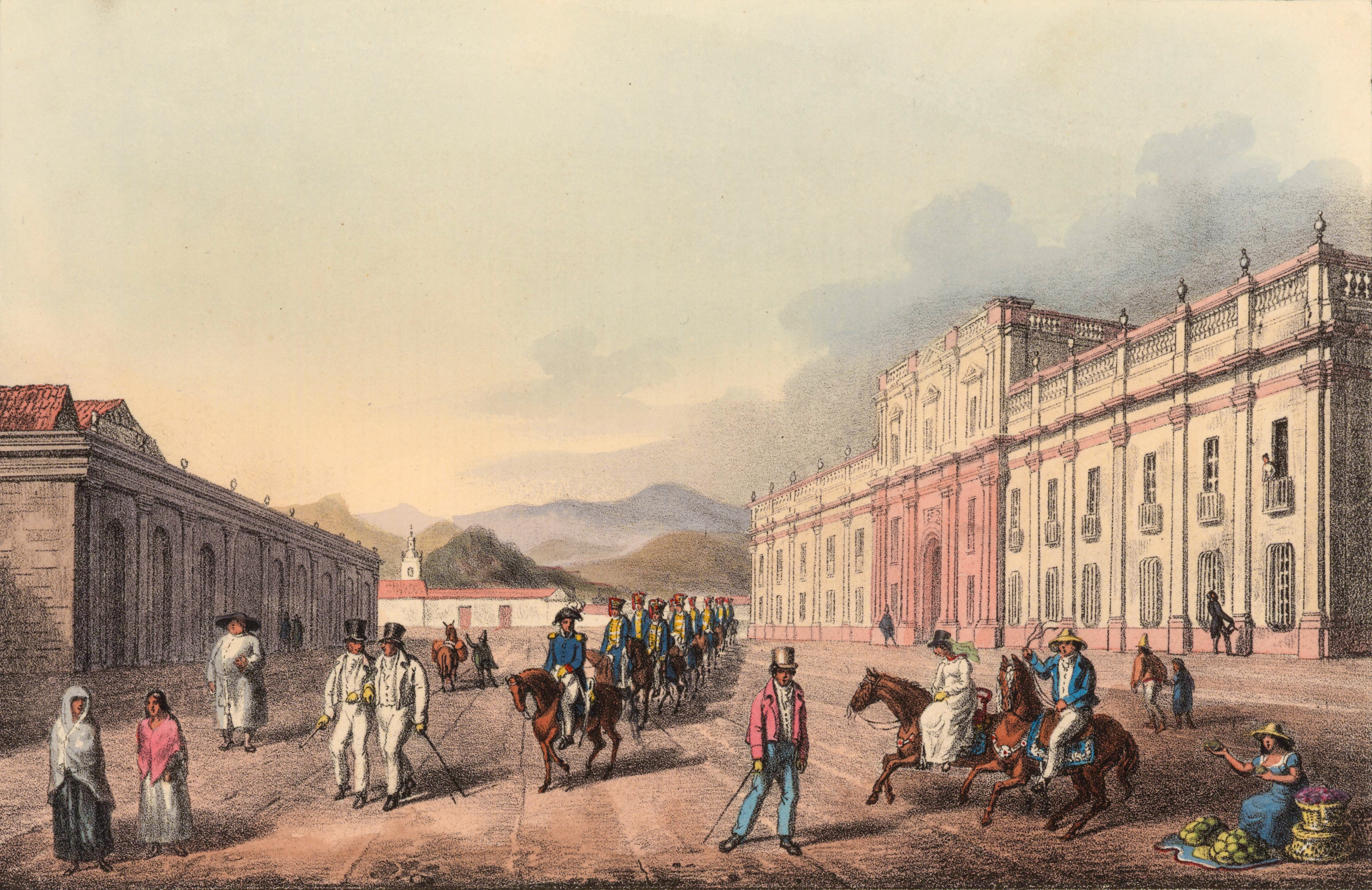
The colonial Real Casa de la Moneda (now called Palacio de la Moneda) in 1824 (by Paroissien, Scharf and Rowney & Forster). John Carter Brown Library.

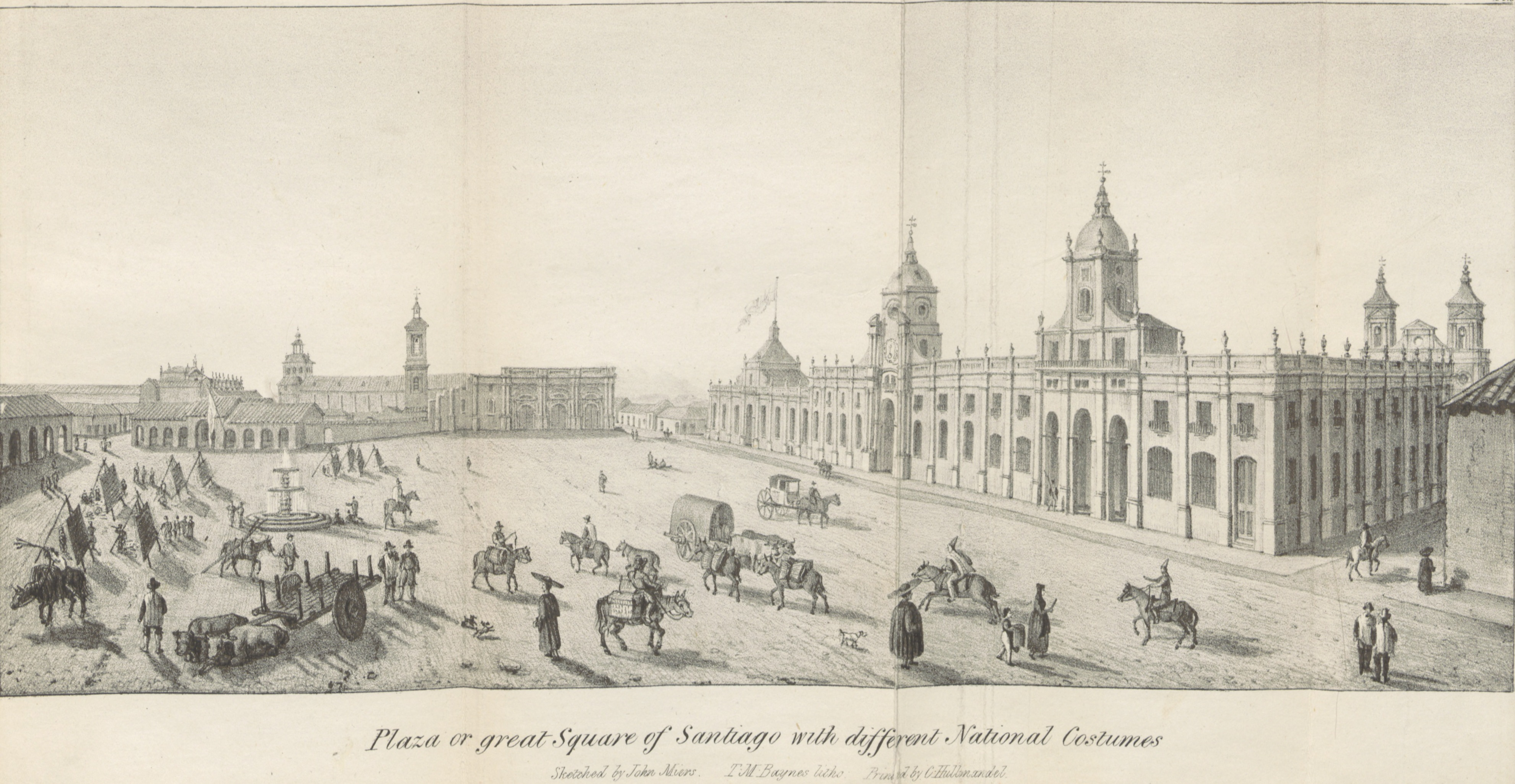
[Colonial] Plaza or great Square of Santiago with different local costumes, in 1826, by John Miers. British Library.

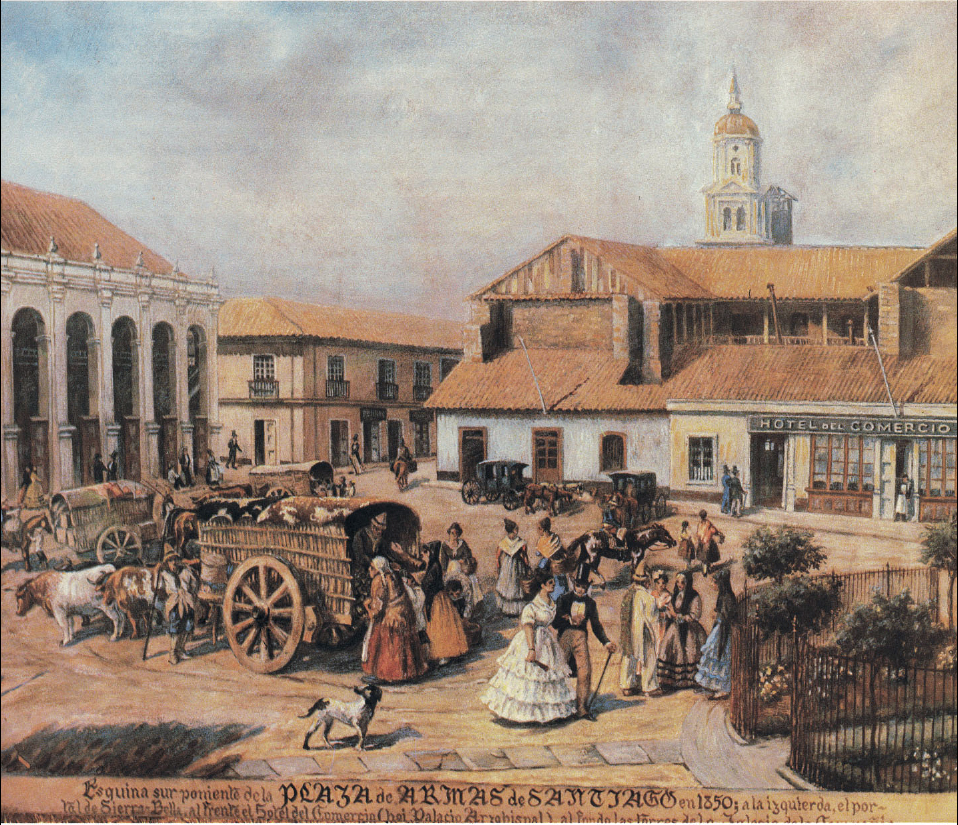
[Colonial] Square in Downtown Santiago, in 1850, by the French-born Ernest Charton.

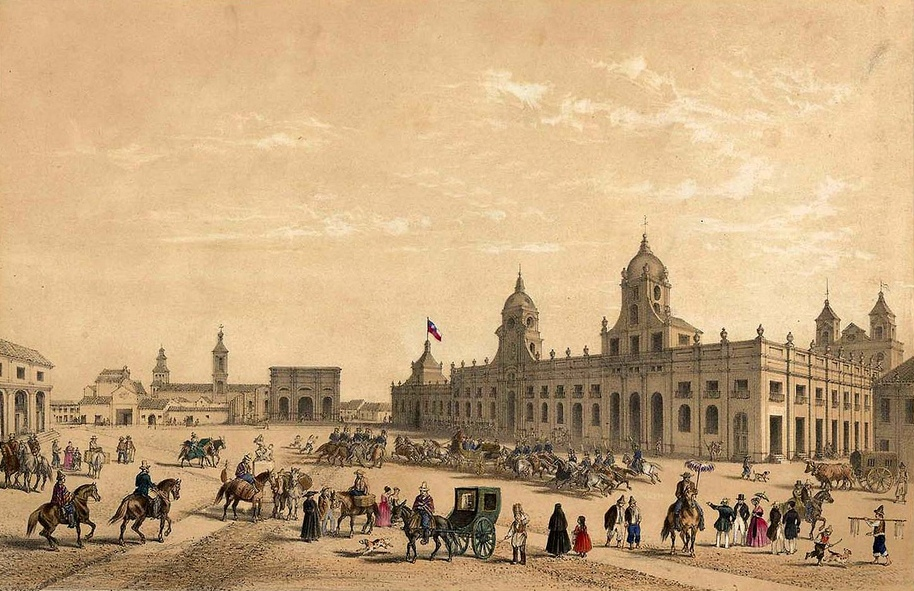
Colonial Plaza de Armas de Santiago in 1854 by Claude Gay. In the foreground you can see the still intact Palace of the Real Audiencia of Chile, and in the background the unfinished Cathedral, both built by the Italian Joaquin Toesca.

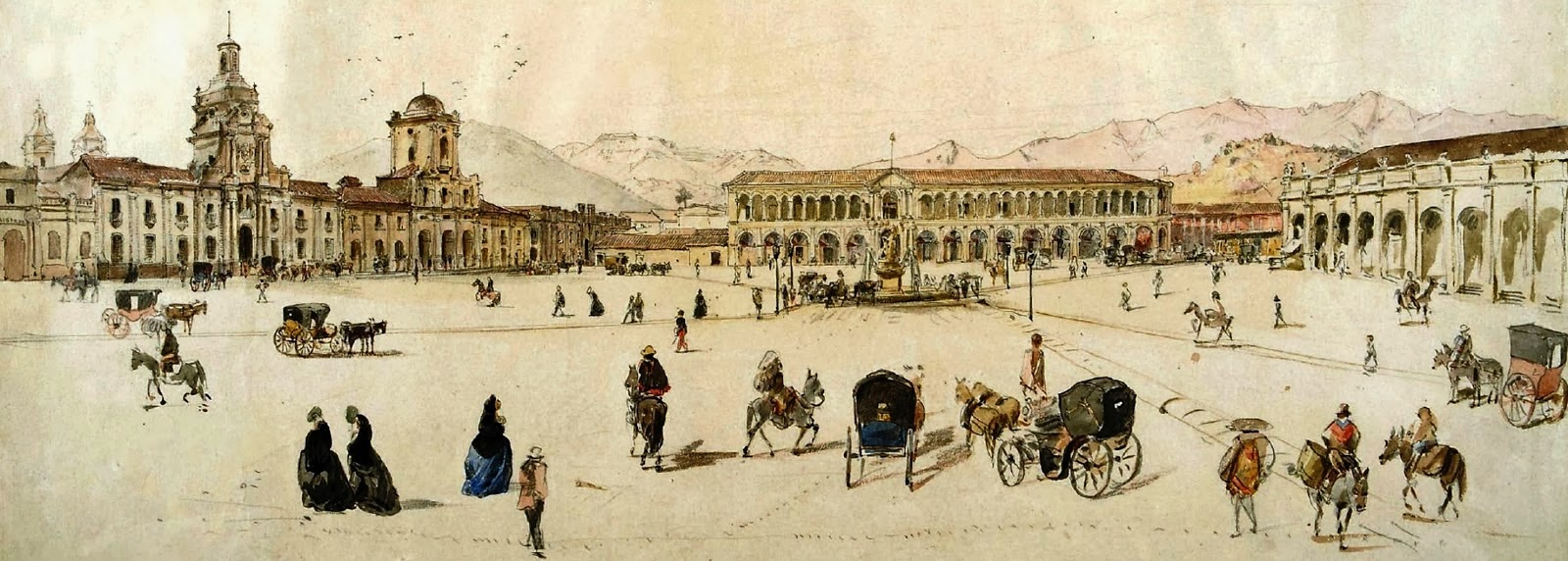
Colonial Plaza de Armas de Santiago in 1859 by Joseph Selleny aboard the Novara expedition. To the left, the (beginning to be modified) Palace of the Real Audiencia of Chile, and to the right, the colonial Portal de Sierra Bella.

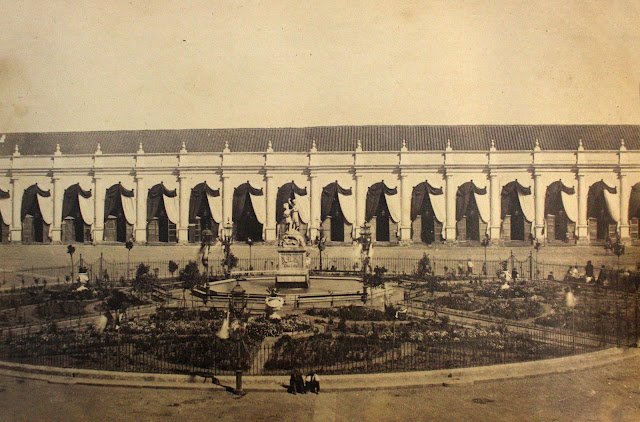
Portal de Sierra Bella and gardens of the Plaza de Armas in 1860. The colonial imprint was maintained until well into the 19th century, this commercial portal faithfully reflects the appearance of colonial Santiago. Photograph by Eugéne Maunoury, belonging to the Bibliothèque nationale de France.

=== Capital of the Republic ===
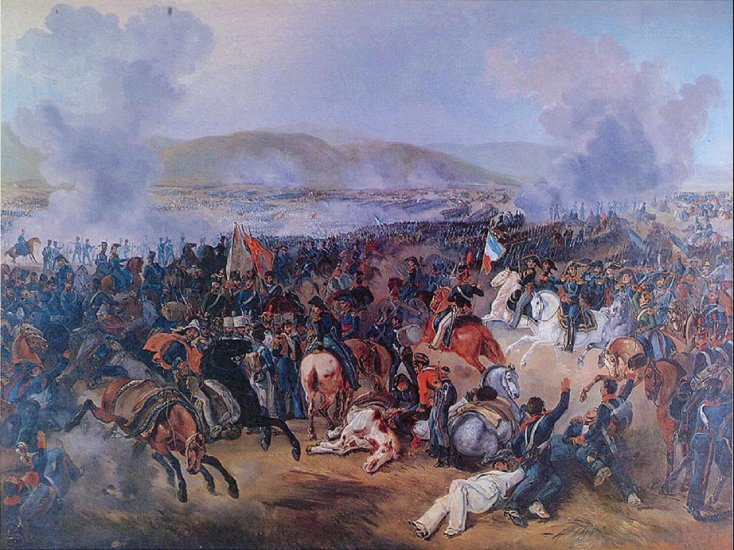
Battle of Maipú, 1818

On September 18, 1810, the First Government Junta was proclaimed in Santiago, marking the beginning of Chile’s path to independence. The city, which became the capital of the newly formed nation, faced various challenges, particularly from military actions in the vicinity.

Although institutions like the Instituto Nacional and the National Library were established during the Patria Vieja, they were shut down after the patriots’ defeat at the Battle of Rancagua in 1814. The royal government continued until 1817, when the Army of the Andes emerged victorious at the Battle of Chacabuco and restored the patriot government in Santiago. However, independence was still uncertain. The Spanish army achieved further victories in 1818 and advanced toward Santiago, but their progress was finally halted at the Battle of Maipú on April 5, 1818, on the Maipo River plains.

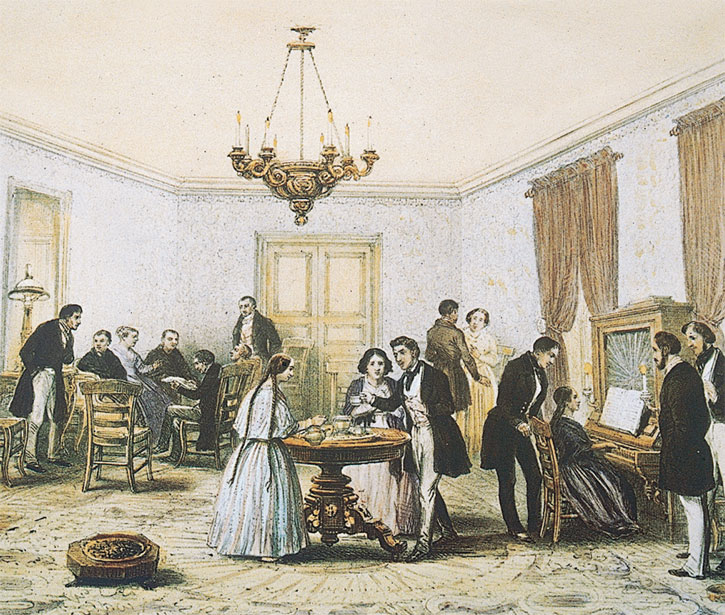
Painting of 1840 by Claude Gay depicting a tertulia of Santiago neighbors.

With the end of the war, Bernardo O'Higgins was accepted as Supreme Director and, like his father, undertook several important projects for the city. During the Patria Nueva era, previously closed institutions were reopened. The General Cemetery was inaugurated, work on the San Carlos Canal was completed, and the drying riverbed in the south arm of the Mapocho River, known as La Cañada, which had been used as a landfill for some time, was transformed into an avenue now known as the Alameda de las Delicias.

Two earthquakes struck the city in the 19th century: one on November 19, 1822, and another on February 20, 1835. Despite these disasters, the city continued to grow rapidly. In 1820, the population was recorded as 46,000, but by 1854, it had risen to 69,018. By 1865, the census reported 115,337 residents. This significant increase was due to suburban expansion to the south and west of the capital, as well as the growth of the bustling district of La Chimba, which resulted from the division of old properties in the area. This new peripheral development marked the end of the previous checkerboard structure that had dominated the city center.

=== 19th century ===
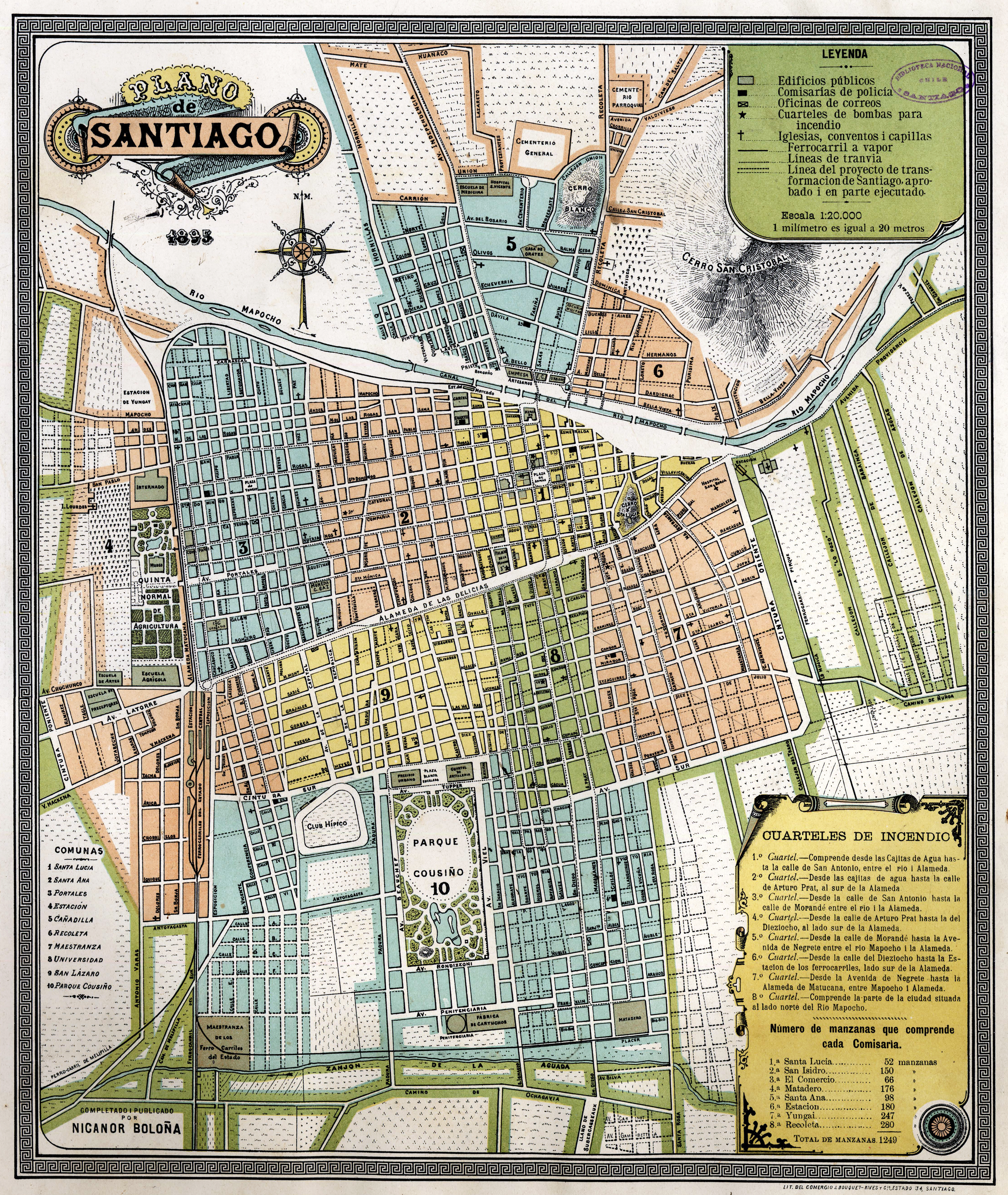
Map of Santiago in 1895.

During the Republican era, several institutions were founded, including the University of Chile, the Normal School of Preceptors, the School of Arts and Crafts, and the Quinta Normal. The latter comprised the Museum of Fine Arts (now the Museum of Science and Technology) and the National Museum of Natural History. These institutions were established primarily for educational purposes, but also served as examples of public planning during that period. In 1851, the first telegraph system connecting the capital to the Port of Valparaíso was inaugurated.

During the "Liberal Republic" and the administration of Mayor Benjamín Vicuña Mackenna, a new phase in the urban development of the capital was initiated. One of the main projects during this period was the remodeling of Cerro Santa Lucía, which had fallen into disrepair despite its central location. In his effort to transform Santiago, Vicuña Mackenna initiated the construction of the Camino de Cintura, a road surrounding the entire city. The redevelopment of Alameda Avenue also took place during this time, turning it into the city's main road.

Also during this era, O'Higgins Park was established with the help of European landscapers in 1873. The public park, known for its large gardens, lakes, and carriage trails, became a landmark in Santiago. Other notable structures were also opened during this period, including the Teatro Municipal opera house and the Club Hípico de Santiago. In addition, the 1875 International Exposition was held in the Quinta Normal grounds.

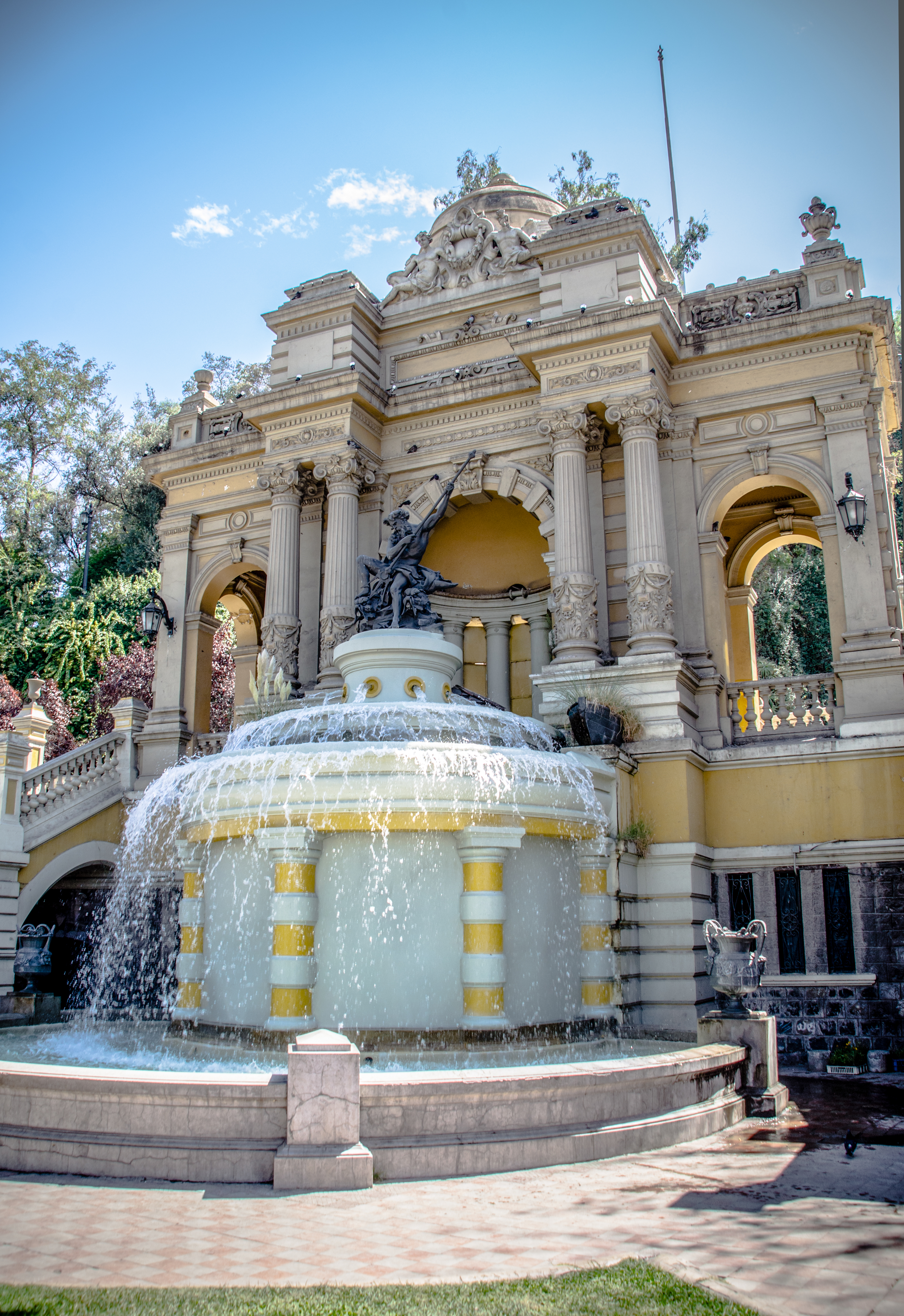
The Fuente de Neptuno, in the Santa Lucía Hill.

Santiago emerged as the central hub of the national railway system. On 14 September 1857, the first railway arrived in the city and terminated at the Santiago Estación Central railway station, which was under construction at the time and officially opened in 1884. During this period, rail lines connected Santiago to Valparaíso and regions in northern and southern Chile. The streets of Santiago were also paved, and by 1875, there were 1,107 railway cars in the city, while 45,000 people used trams daily.

=== The centennial Santiago ===
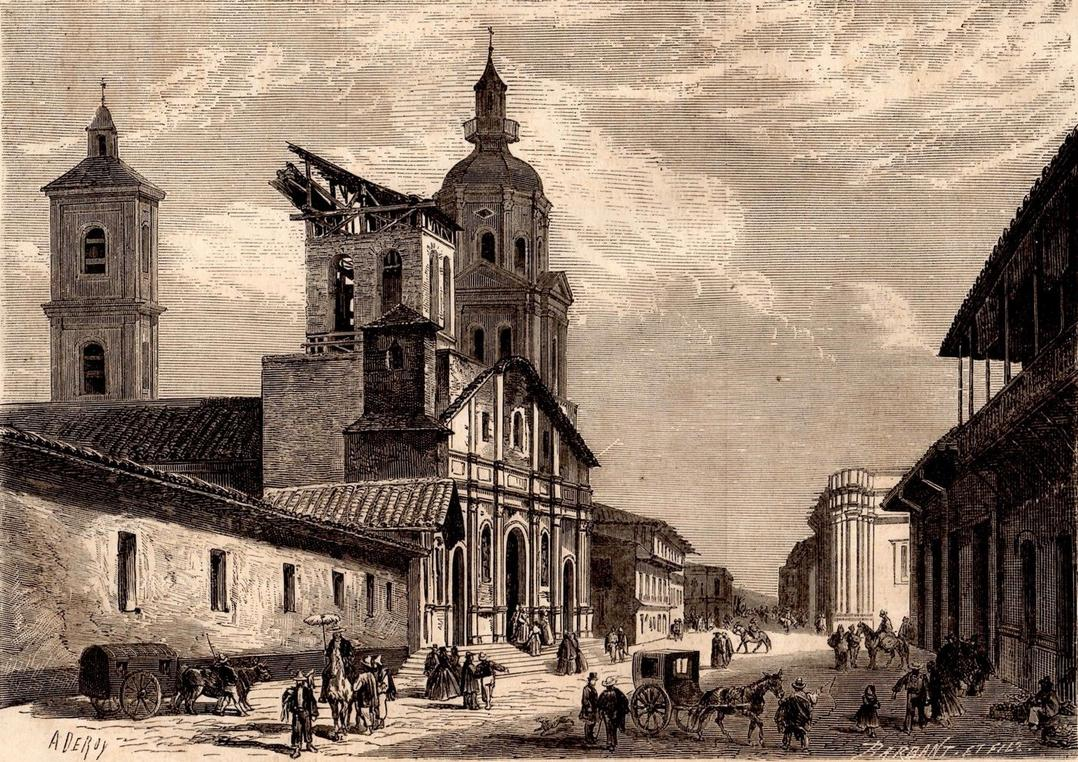
A Jesuit Church in Santiago in 1857, by Charles Barbant and Son for Le Monde Illustré.

As the new century began, Santiago underwent various changes due to the rapid growth of industry. Valparaíso, which had previously been the economic center of the country, gradually lost its prominence to the capital. By 1895, 75% of the national manufacturing industry was located in Santiago, while only 28% was in Valparaíso. By 1910, major banks and shops had established themselves in the central streets of Santiago, further diminishing the role of Valparaíso.

The enactment of the Autonomous Municipalities Act empowered municipalities to establish various administrative divisions within the Santiago department, with the goal of enhancing local governance. In 1891, the municipalities of Maipú, Ñuñoa, Renca, Lampa, and Colina were created, followed by Providencia and Barrancas in 1897, and Las Condes in 1901. The La Victoria departmento was also divided, leading to the creation of Lo Cañas in 1891, which was then further split into La Granja and Puente Alto in 1892, followed by La Florida in 1899, and La Cisterna in 1925.

The San Cristobal Hill underwent a prolonged process of development during this period. In 1903, an astronomical observatory was established on the hill, and the following year, construction began on a 14-meter (46 ft) statue of the Virgin Mary. Today, the statue is visible from various points in the city. However, the shrine was not completed until several decades later.

The 1910 Chile Centennial celebrations marked the beginning of several urban development projects. The railway network was expanded, connecting the city and its growing suburbs with a new ring and route to Cajón del Maipo. A new railway station was also built in the north of the city: the Mapocho Station. The Parque Forestal was established on the southern side of the Mapocho river, and new buildings such as the Museum of Fine Arts, the Barros Arana public boarding school, and the National Library were opened. In addition, a sewer system was installed, serving approximately 85% of the city's population.

=== Population explosion ===
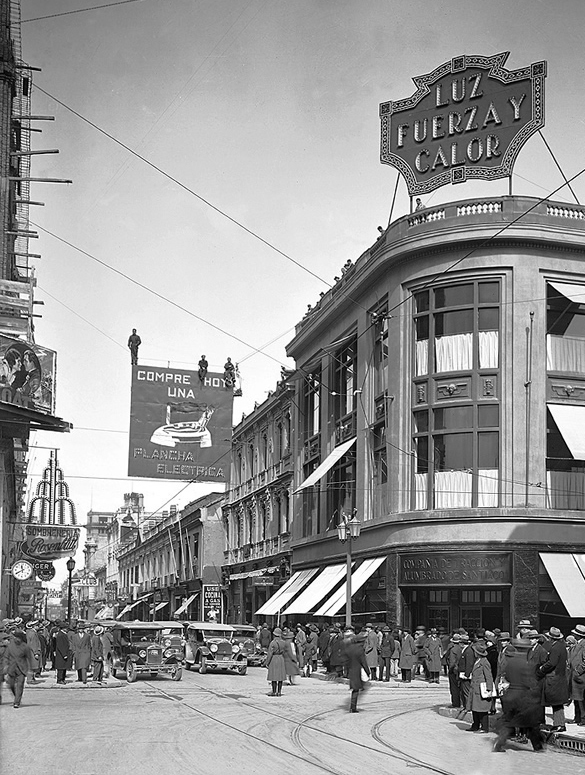
View of Paseo Ahumada, in the city center, in the late 1920s.

The 1920 census estimated the population of Santiago to be 507,296 inhabitants, equivalent to 13.6% of the total population of Chile. This represented a growth of 52.5% from the 1907 census, an annual increase of 3.3%, which was almost three times the national average. This growth was mainly due to an influx of farmers from the southern regions who came to work in the factories and railroads that were being built. However, this growth was concentrated in the suburbs and not downtown.

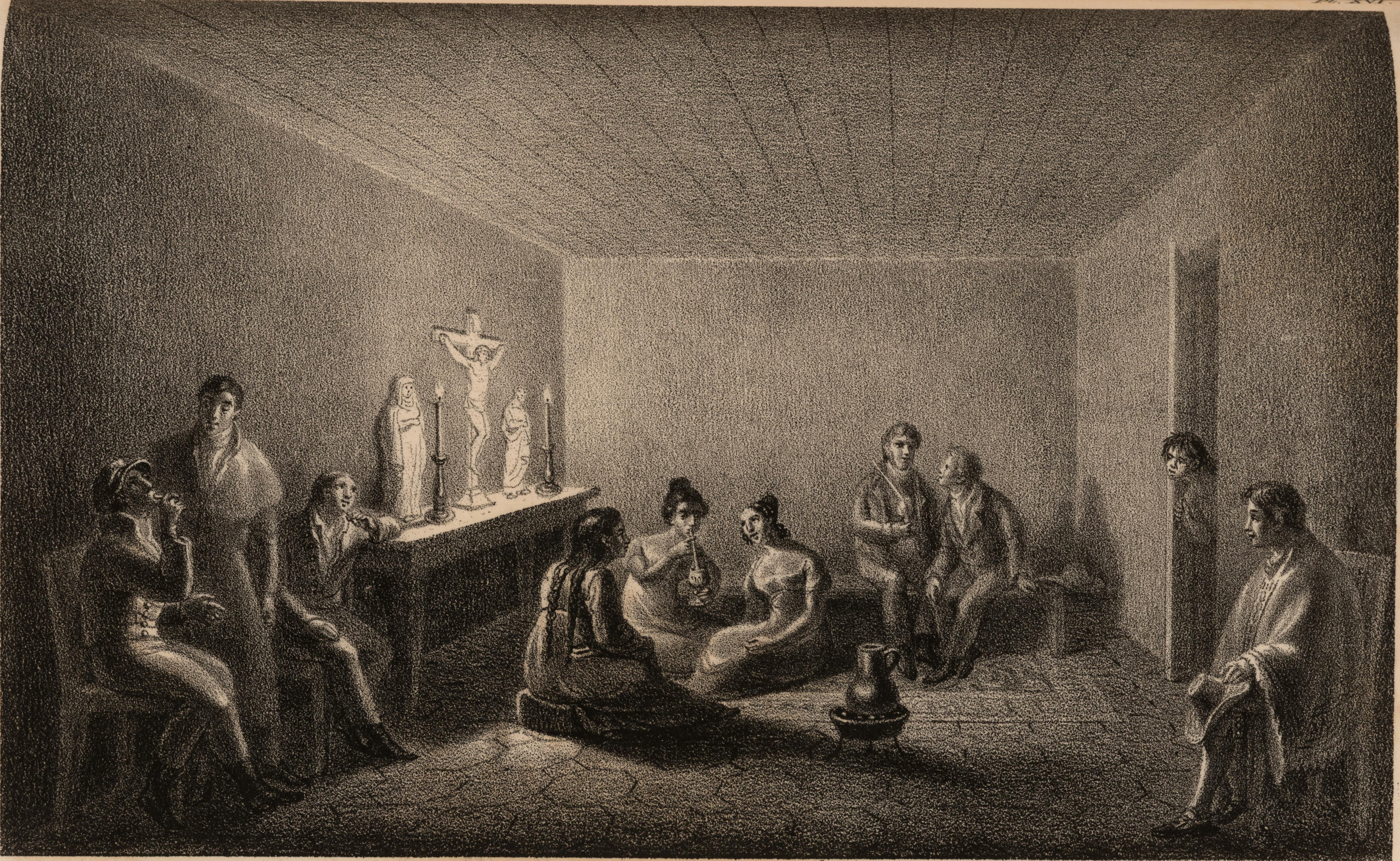
[Colonial] Tertulia and Mate party in Santiago de Chile, in 1821, by Scharf and Schmidtmeyer. John Carter Brown Library.

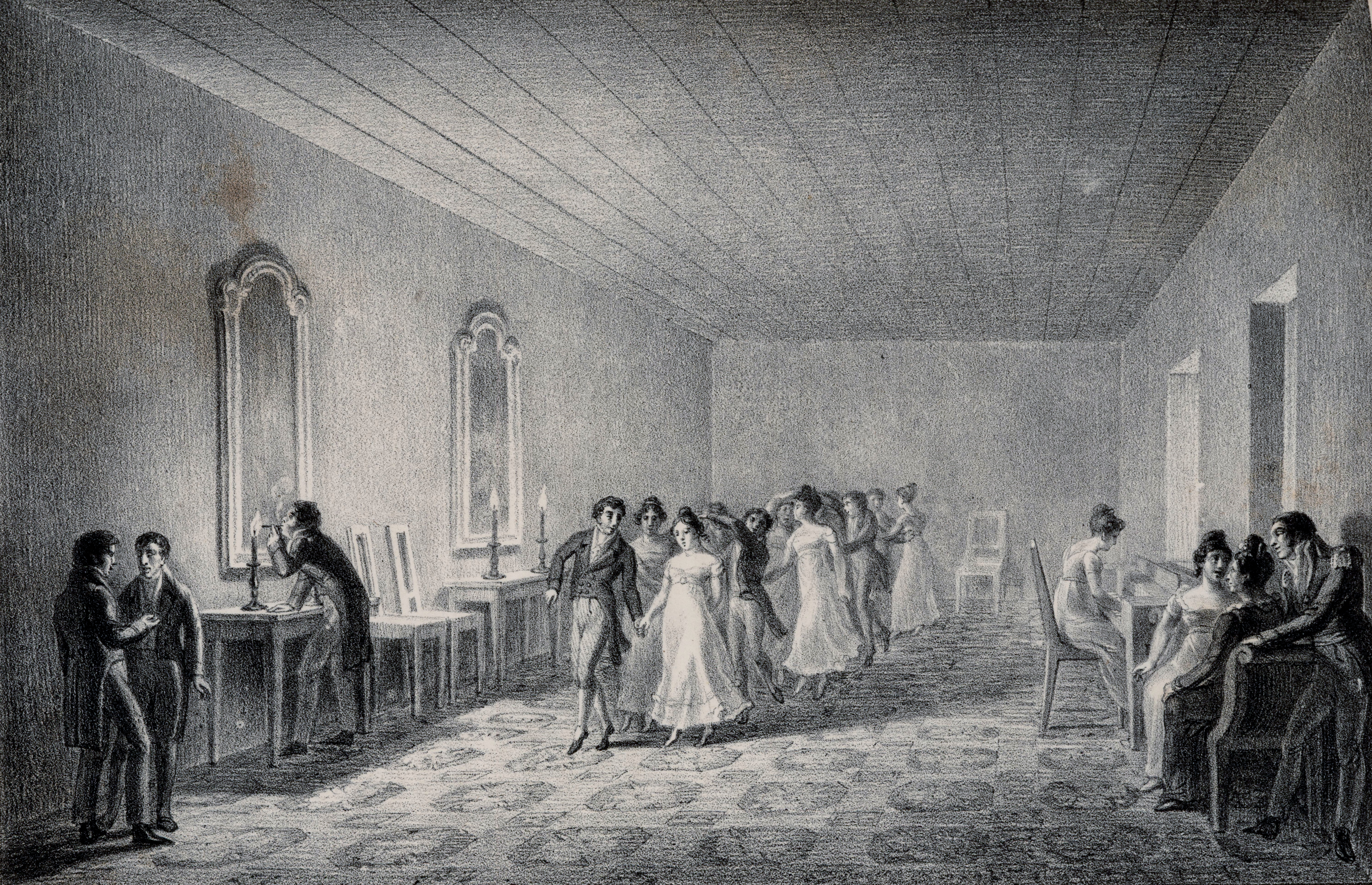
"Tertulia in a house of a very hospitable family of Santiago de Chile", in 1821, by Scharf and Schmidtmeyer. John Carter Brown Library.

During this time, the downtown district consolidated as a commercial, financial, and administrative center, with the establishment of various shops and businesses around Ahumada Street and a Civic District in the vicinity of the Palace of La Moneda. The latter project involved the construction of modernist buildings for the offices of the ministries and other public services, as well as the start of the construction of medium-rise buildings. Meanwhile, the traditional residents of the center began to migrate to more rural areas like Providencia and Ñuñoa, which attracted the oligarchy and European immigrant professionals, and San Miguel for middle-class families. Additionally, in the periphery, villas were built by various organizations of the time. Modernity also spread in the city, with the introduction of the first theaters, the expansion of the telephone network, and the opening of Los Cerrillos Airport in 1928, among other advancements.

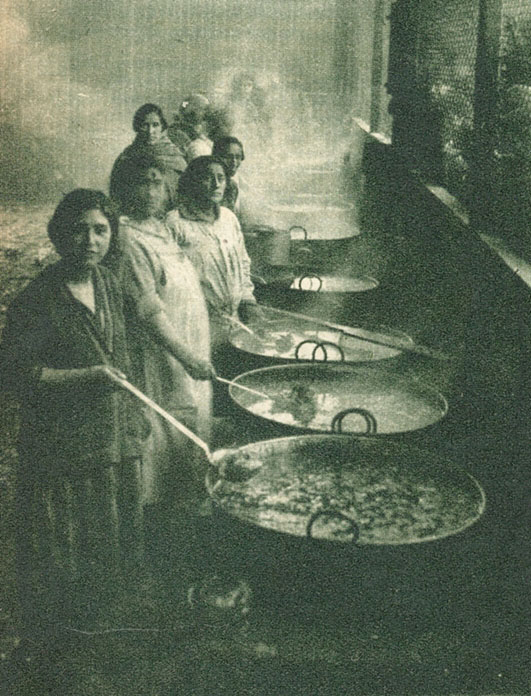
Women prepare community soup kitchens in 1932 to feed the unemployed.

The perception that the early 20th century was a time of economic prosperity due to technological advancements was in stark contrast to the living conditions of lower social classes. The previous decades of growth resulted in an unprecedented population boom starting in 1929, but was met with tragedy as the Great Depression hit. The collapse of the nitrate industry in the north left 60,000 people unemployed, compounded by a decline in agricultural exports, resulting in an estimated 300,000 unemployed people nationwide. Desperate for survival, many migrants flocked to Santiago and its thriving industry. However, they often found themselves struggling to find housing, with many being forced to live on the streets. The harsh living conditions resulted in widespread diseases like tuberculosis, and took a toll on the homeless population. At the same time, unemployment rates and living costs skyrocketed, while the salaries of the people in Santiago fell.

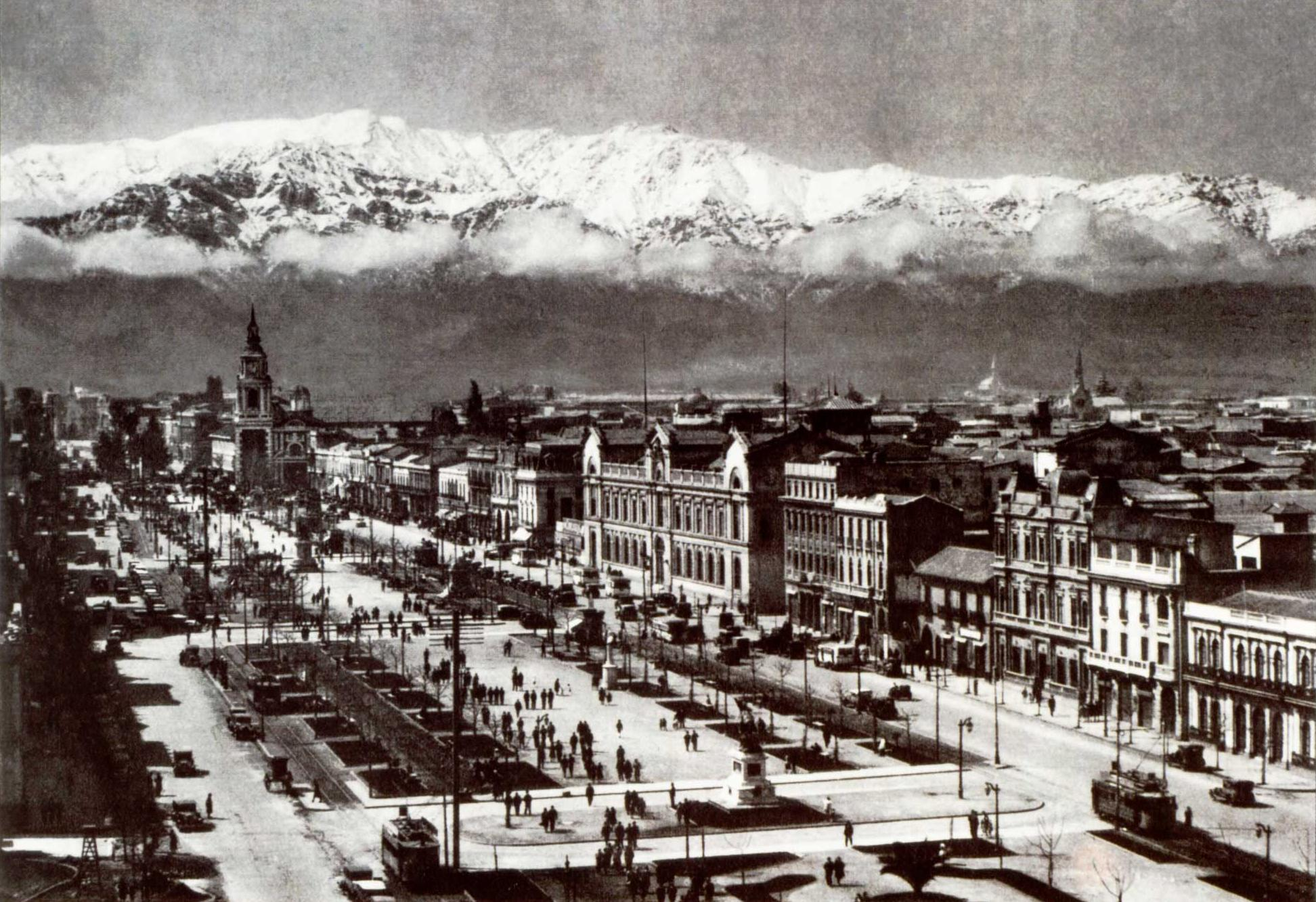
View of La Alameda in 1930.

The situation would change several years later with a new industrial boom fostered by CORFO and the expansion of the state apparatus from the late 1930s. At this time, the aristocracy lost much of its power, and the middle class, composed of merchants, bureaucrats, and professionals, acquired the role of setting national policy. In this context, Santiago began to develop a substantial middle- and lower-class population, while the upper classes sought refuge in the districts of the capital. Thus, the old moneyed class, who previously frequented Cousiño and Alameda Park, lost their hegemony over popular entertainment venues, and the National Stadium emerged in 1938.

=== Greater Santiago ===
Relative growth of Santiago, by communes
	1940	1952	1960	1970
Barrancas	100	223	792	1978
Conchalí	100	225	440	684
La Granja	100	264	1379	3424
Las Condes	100	197	506	1083
Ñuñoa	100	196	325	535
Renca	100	175	317	406
San Miguel	100	221	373	488
Santiago	100	104	101	81

In the following decades, Santiago continued to grow at an unprecedented rate. In 1940, the city had a population of 952,075 residents, which increased to 1,350,409 by 1952, and reached 1,907,378 in the 1960 census. This growth was reflected in the urbanization of rural areas on the outskirts of the city, where middle and lower-class families with stable housing were established. In 1930, the urban area covered 6,500 hectares, which increased to 20,900 in 1960 and to 38,296 in 1980. Although growth was mainly concentrated in communities such as Barrancas to the west, Conchalí to the north, and La Cisterna and La Granja to the south, the center of the city lost population, leaving more space for commercial, banking, and government development. The upper class, on the other hand, began to settle in the foothills of Las Condes and the La Reina sector.

The regulation of growth in Santiago only began in the 1960s with the creation of various development plans for Greater Santiago, a concept that reflected the city's new reality as a much larger urban center. In 1958, the Intercommunal Plan of Santiago was released, which proposed a limit of 38,600 urban and semi-urban hectares for a maximum population of 3,260,000 residents. The plan also included plans for the construction of new avenues, such as the Américo Vespucio Avenue and Panamericana Route 5, as well as the expansion of 'industrial belts'. The 1962 World Cup provided a new impetus for city improvement efforts, and in 1966, the Santiago Metropolitan Park was established on Cerro San Cristóbal. The Ministry of Housing and Urbanism (MINVU) also began to eradicate shantytowns and build new homes. Finally, the Edificio Diego Portales was constructed in 1972.

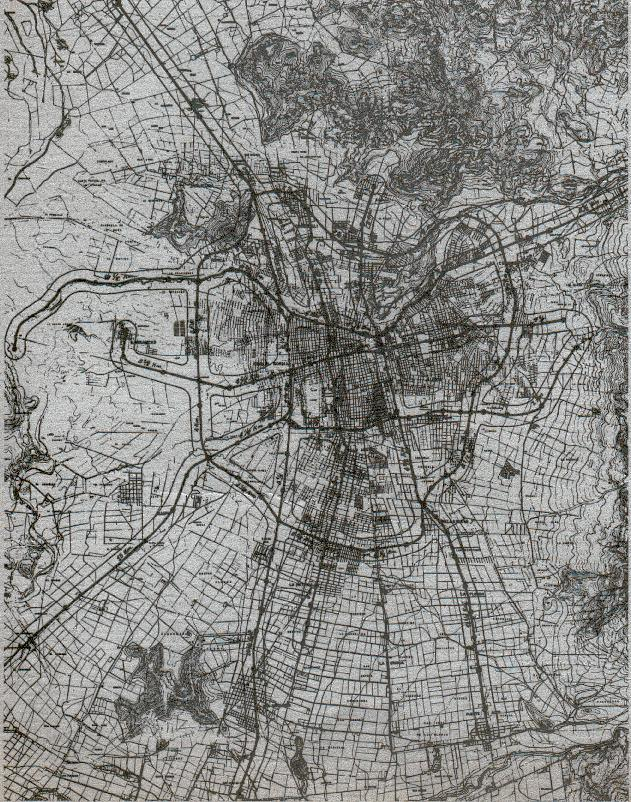
Extension of Greater Santiago, in 1965.

In 1967, the new Pudahuel International Airport was opened, and after years of discussion, construction of the Santiago Metro began in 1969. The first phase of the Metro, which ran beneath the western section of Alameda, was opened in 1975 and soon became one of the most prestigious buildings in the city. Over the following years, the Metro continued to expand, with two perpendicular lines in place by the end of 1978. Building telecommunications infrastructure was also an important development of this period, as reflected in the construction of the Torre Entel, which, since its construction in 1975, has become one of the symbols of the capital and remained the tallest structure in the country for two decades.

After the military coup of 1973 and the establishment of the military regime, significant changes in urban planning did not occur until the 1980s when the government embraced a neoliberal economic model. In 1979, the master plan was revised, expanding the urban area to over 62,000 hectares for real estate development. This led to urban sprawl, particularly in La Florida, causing the city to reach 40,619 hectares in size in the early 1990s. According to the 1992 census, Santiago became the country's most populous municipality, with 328,881 residents.

On 21 March 1981, a fire in the Torre Santa María killed 11 people.

A powerful earthquake struck the city on 3 March 1985, causing minimal casualties but leaving many homeless and destroying numerous historic buildings.

=== The metropolis in the early twenty-first century ===
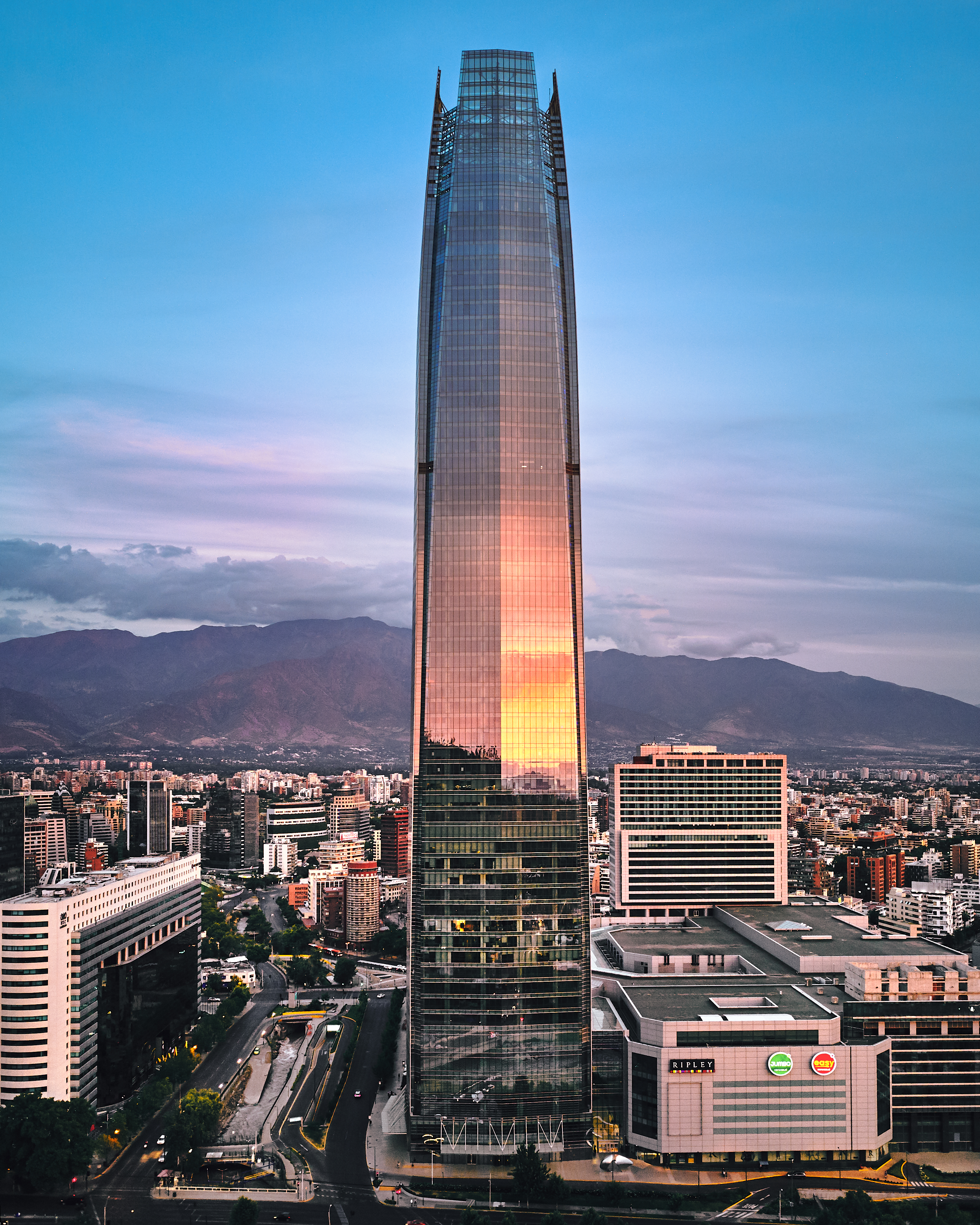
The Gran Torre Costanera is the tallest building in South America and second tallest in Ibero-America. It is part of the Costanera Center complex.

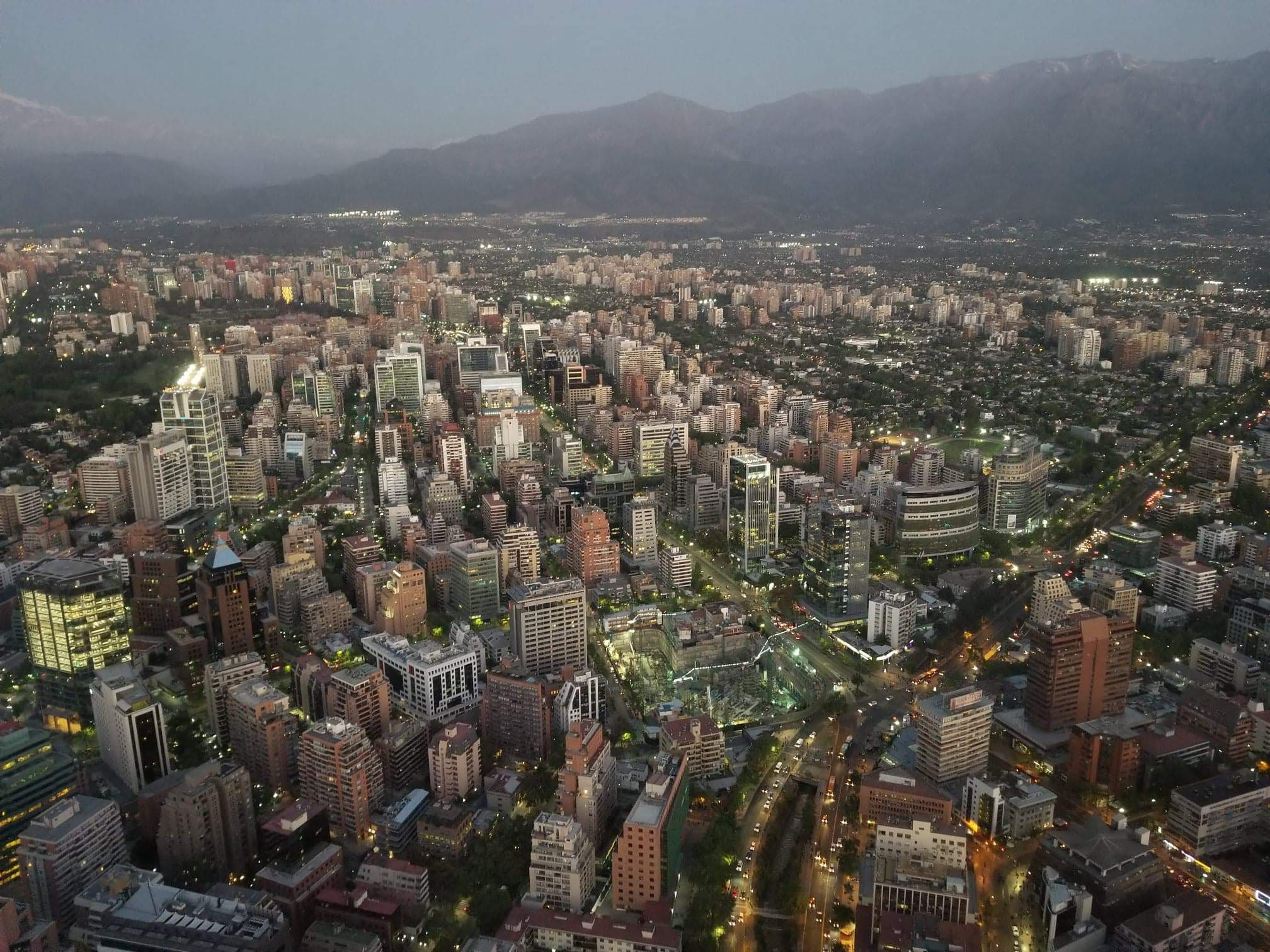
Northwestern Las Condes from Sky Costanera in 2018

With the onset of the transition to democracy in 1990, the city of Santiago surpassed four million inhabitants, with the majority residing in the south, particularly in La Florida, which was the most populous area, followed by Puente Alto and Maipú. The real estate development in these municipalities, as well as in others such as Quilicura and Peñalolén, was largely driven by the construction of housing projects for middle-class families. Meanwhile, high-income families relocated to the foothills, now commonly referred to as Barrio Alto, boosting the population of Las Condes and giving rise to young communes, including Lo Barnechea and Vitacura, both established in 1981 and 1991, respectively.

The area around Providencia Avenue became an important commercial hub in the eastern sector. This development extended to the Barrio Alto, which became an attractive location for the construction of high-rise buildings. Major companies and financial corporations established themselves in the area, giving rise to a thriving modern business center commonly known as Sanhattan. The departure of these companies to Barrio Alto and the construction of shopping centers all around the city created a crisis in the city center. To reinvigorate the area, the government transformed the main shopping streets into pedestrian walkways, as it did in the 1970s, and offered tax benefits for the construction of residential buildings, which attracted young adults.

The city faced a series of problems due to disorganized growth. During the winter months, air pollution reached critical levels and a layer of smog blanketed the city. In response, the authorities implemented legislative measures to reduce industrial pollution and placed restrictions on vehicle use. To address the problem of transportation, the metro system underwent significant expansion, with lines being extended and three new lines added between 1997 and 2006 in the southeastern sector. In 2011, a new extension was inaugurated in Maipú, bringing the total length of the metropolitan railway to 105 kilometers (65 mi). In the early 1990s, the bus system also underwent a major reform. In 2007, the master plan known as Transantiago was established, although it has faced various challenges since its implementation.

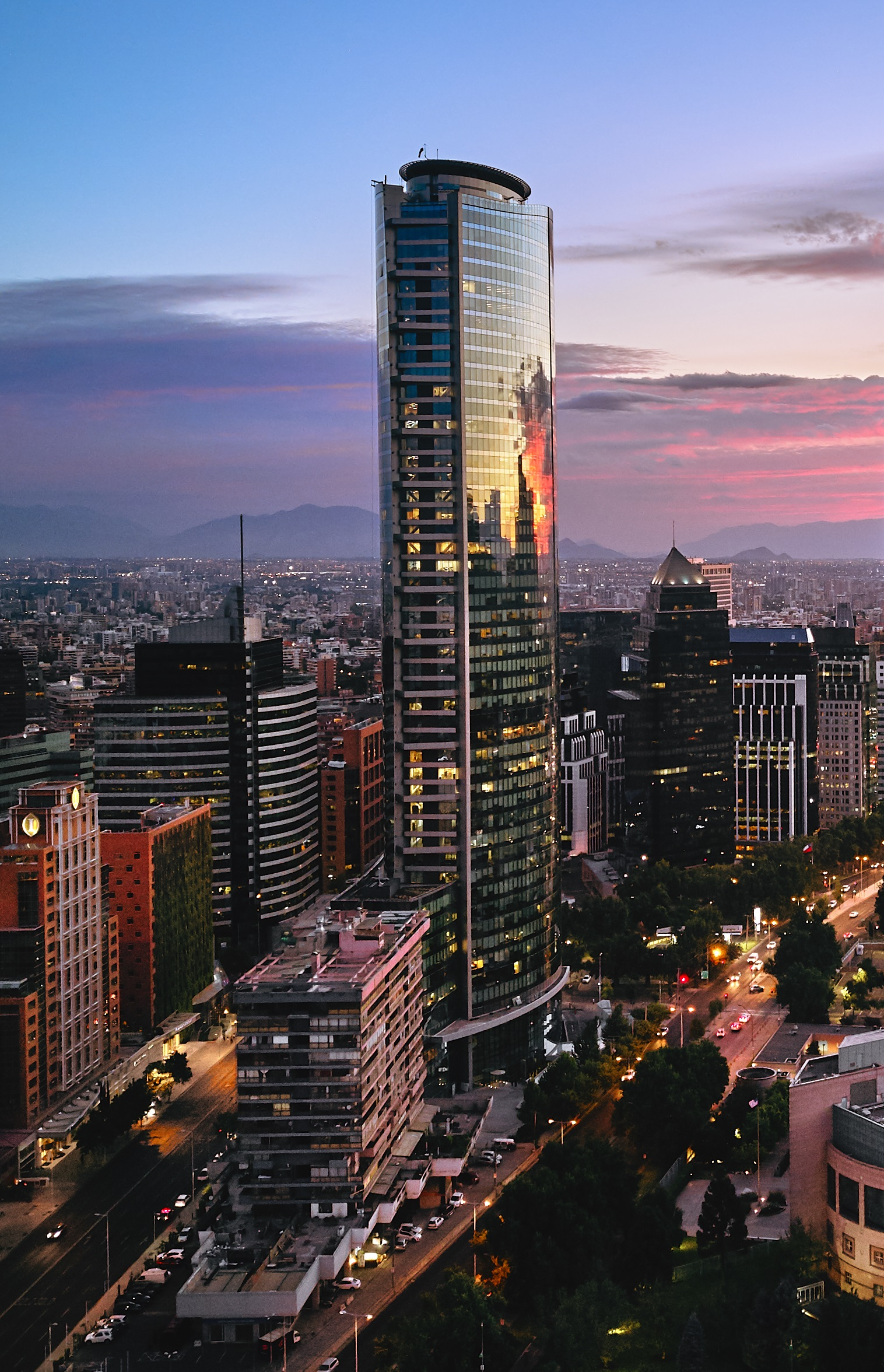
Titanium La Portada

Entering the 21st century, rapid development continued in Santiago. The Civic District was revitalized with the creation of the Plaza de la Ciudadanía and the construction of the Ciudad Parque Bicentenario, which marked the bicentenary of the Republic. The trend of constructing tall buildings continued in the eastern sector, which was highlighted by the opening of the Titanium La Portada and Gran Torre Santiago skyscrapers in the Costanera Center complex.

On 27 February 2010, a powerful earthquake hit the capital city of Santiago, causing damage to some older buildings and rendering some modern structures uninhabitable. This sparked a heated discussion about the actual implementation of mandatory earthquake standards in the city's modern architecture.

Despite urban integration efforts, socioeconomic inequality and geosocial fragmentation remain two of the most important problems, both in the city and in the country. These problems have been considered one of the factors that led to the "Estallido Social", a series of massive protests and severe riots carried out between 2019 and 2020. The protests led to a serious civil confrontation, which led to thousands of arrests and accusations of human rights violations. Meanwhile, the demonstrations registered serious episodes of violence against public and private infrastructure, mainly in the surroundings of Plaza Baquedano, with the Santiago Metro being one of the most affected by these episodes: more than half of its stations registered damage (several being partially set on fire) and only eleven months later the network returned to full normal service.

== Geography ==
=== Features ===
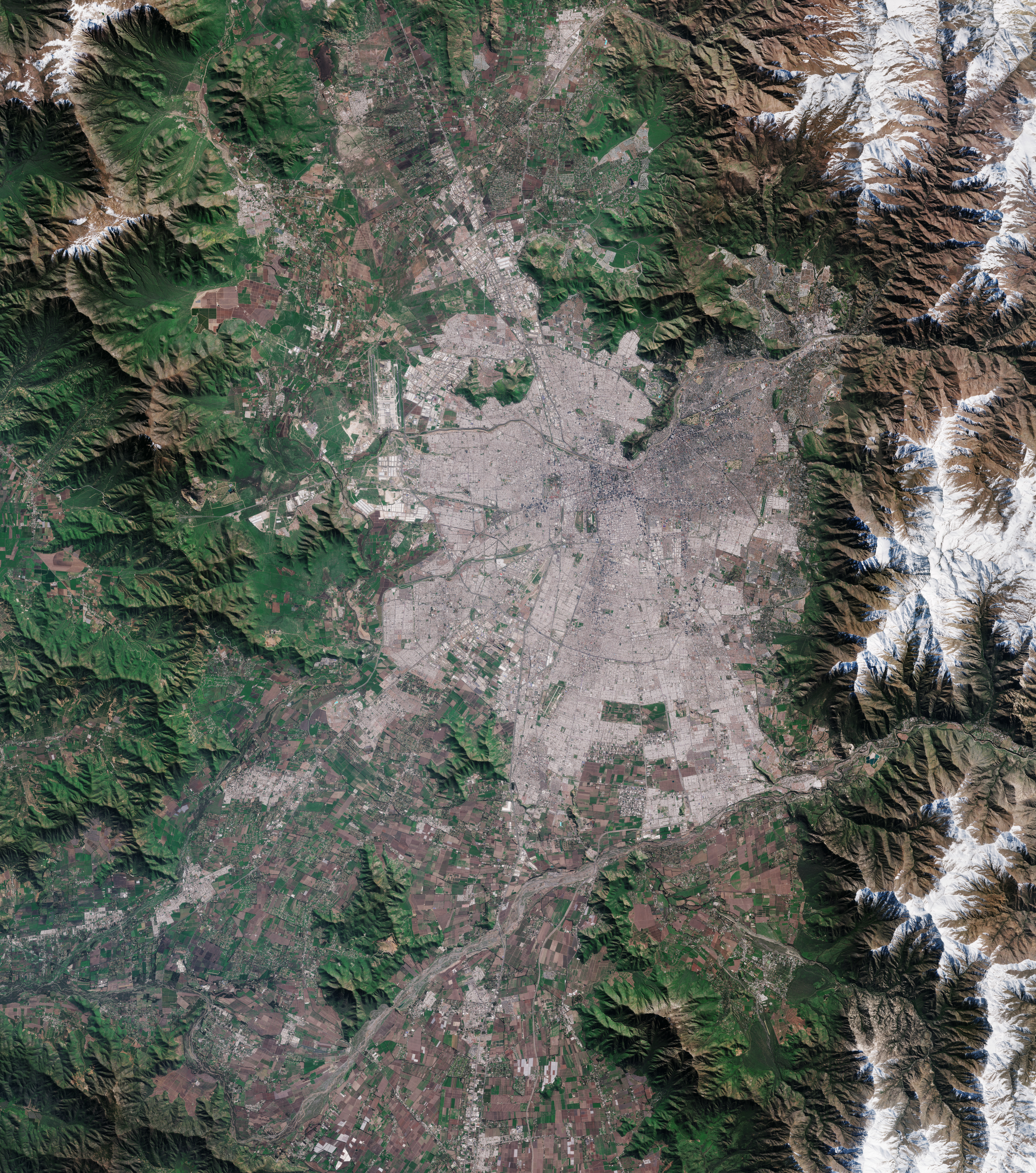
Satellite image of Santiago taken in 2022.

The city lies in the center of the Santiago Basin, a large bowl-shaped valley consisting of broad and fertile lands surrounded by mountains. The city has a varying elevation, gradually increasing from 400 meters (1,300 feet) in the western areas to more than 700 m (2,297 ft) in the eastern areas. Santiago's international airport, in the west, lies at an altitude of 474 m (1,555 ft). The historic center, Plaza de Armas, lies at 565 m (1,854 ft). Estadio San Carlos de Apoquindo, at the eastern edge of the city, has an elevation of 960 m (3,150 ft).

The Santiago Basin is part of the Intermediate Depression and is remarkably flat, interrupted only by a few "island hills"; among them are Cerro Renca, Cerro Blanco, and Cerro Santa Lucía. The basin is approximately 80 kilometers (50 miles) in a north–south direction and 35 km (22 mi) from east to west. The Mapocho River flows through the city.

The city is flanked by the main chain of the Andes to the east and the Chilean Coastal Range to the west. On the north, it is bordered by the Cordón de Chacabuco, a mountain range of the Andes. At the southern border lies the Angostura de Paine, an elongated spur of the Andes that almost reaches the coast.

The mountain range immediately bordering the city on the east is known as the Sierra de Ramón, which was formed due to tectonic activity of the San Ramón Fault. This range reaches 3296 meters at Cerro de Ramón. The Sierra de Ramón represents the "Precordillera" of the Andes. 20 km (12 mi) further east is the even larger Cordillera of the Andes, which has mountains and volcanoes that exceed 6,000 m (19,690 ft) and on which some glaciers are present. The tallest is the Tupungato mountain at 6,570 m (21,555 ft). Other mountains include Tupungatito, San José, and Maipo. Cerro El Plomo is the highest mountain visible from Santiago's urban area.

During recent decades, urban growth has outgrown the boundaries of the city, expanding to the east up the slopes of the Andean Precordillera. In areas such as La Dehesa, Lo Curro, and El Arrayan, urban development is present at over 1,000 meters of altitude.

The natural vegetation of Santiago is made up of a thorny woodland of Vachellia caven (also known as Acacia caven and espinillo) and Prosopis chilensis in the west and an association of Vachellia caven and Baccharis paniculata in the east around the Andean foothills.

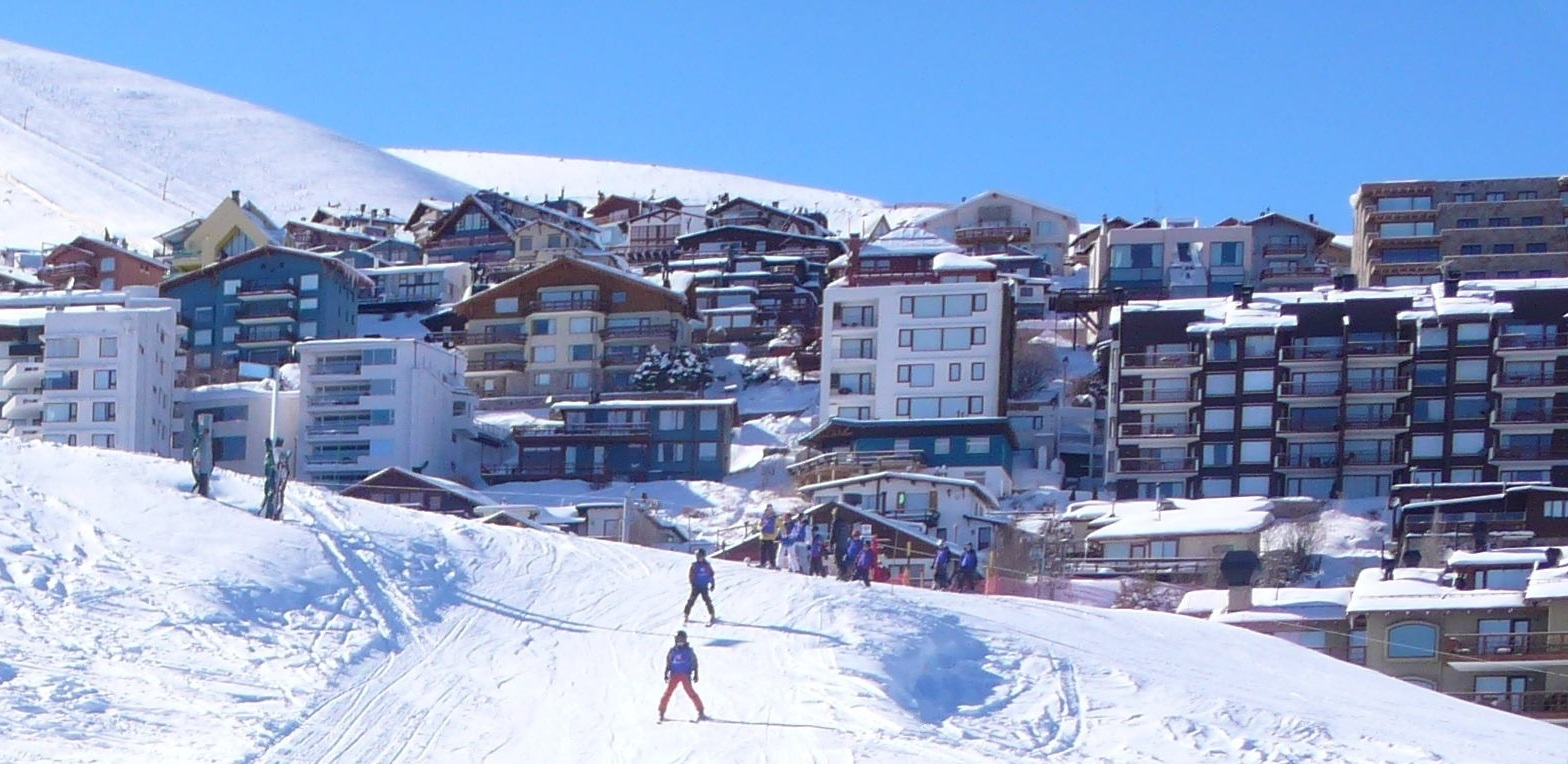
Ski Center La Parva

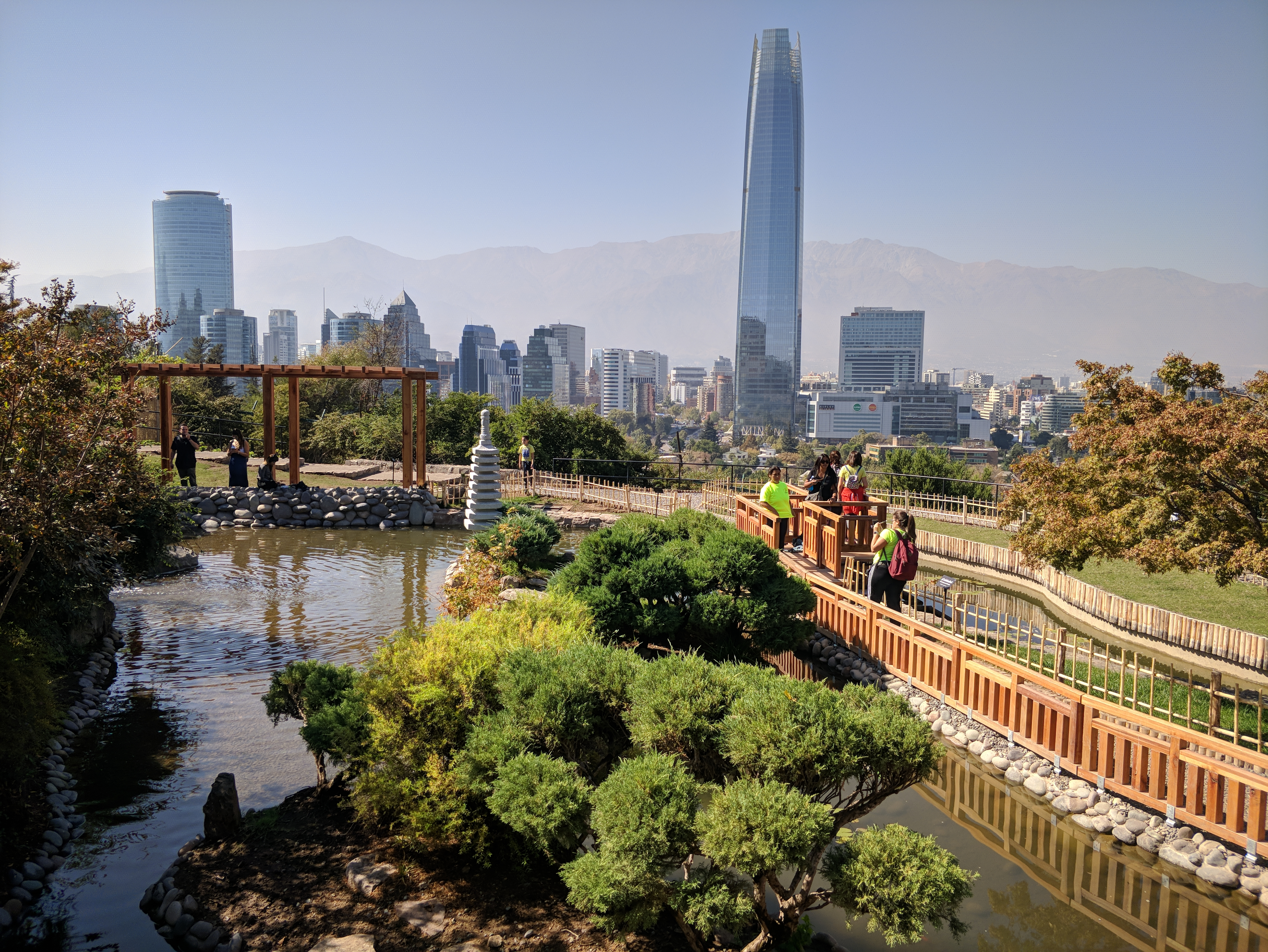
Santiago Metropolitan Park

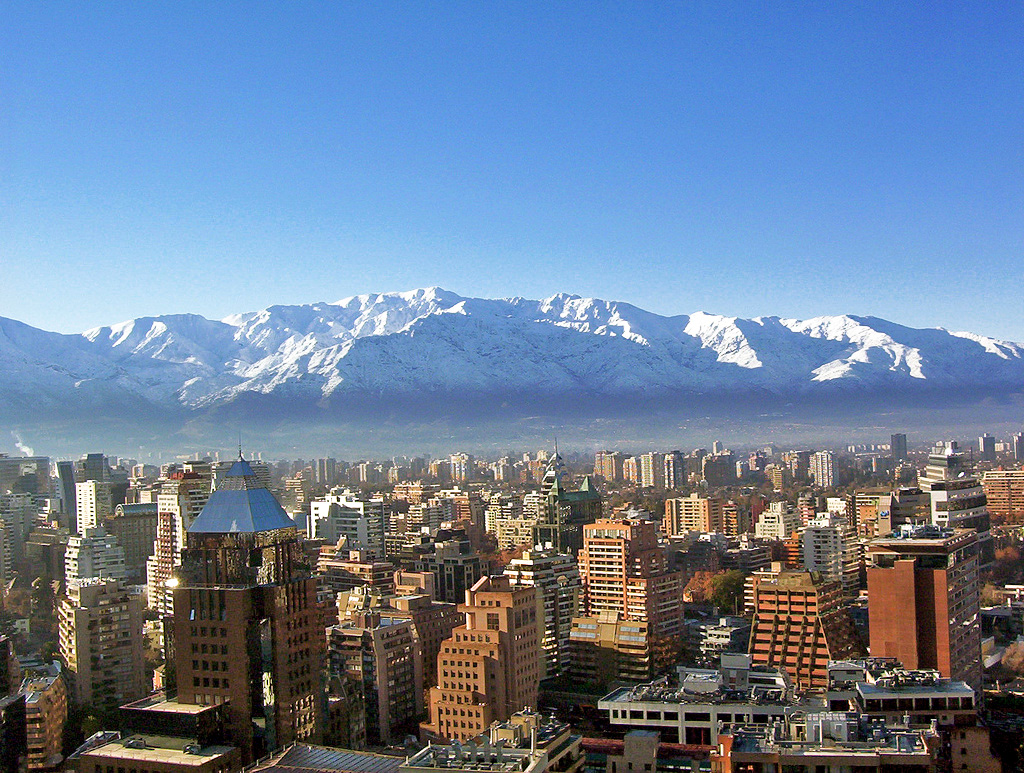
Santiago in the winter

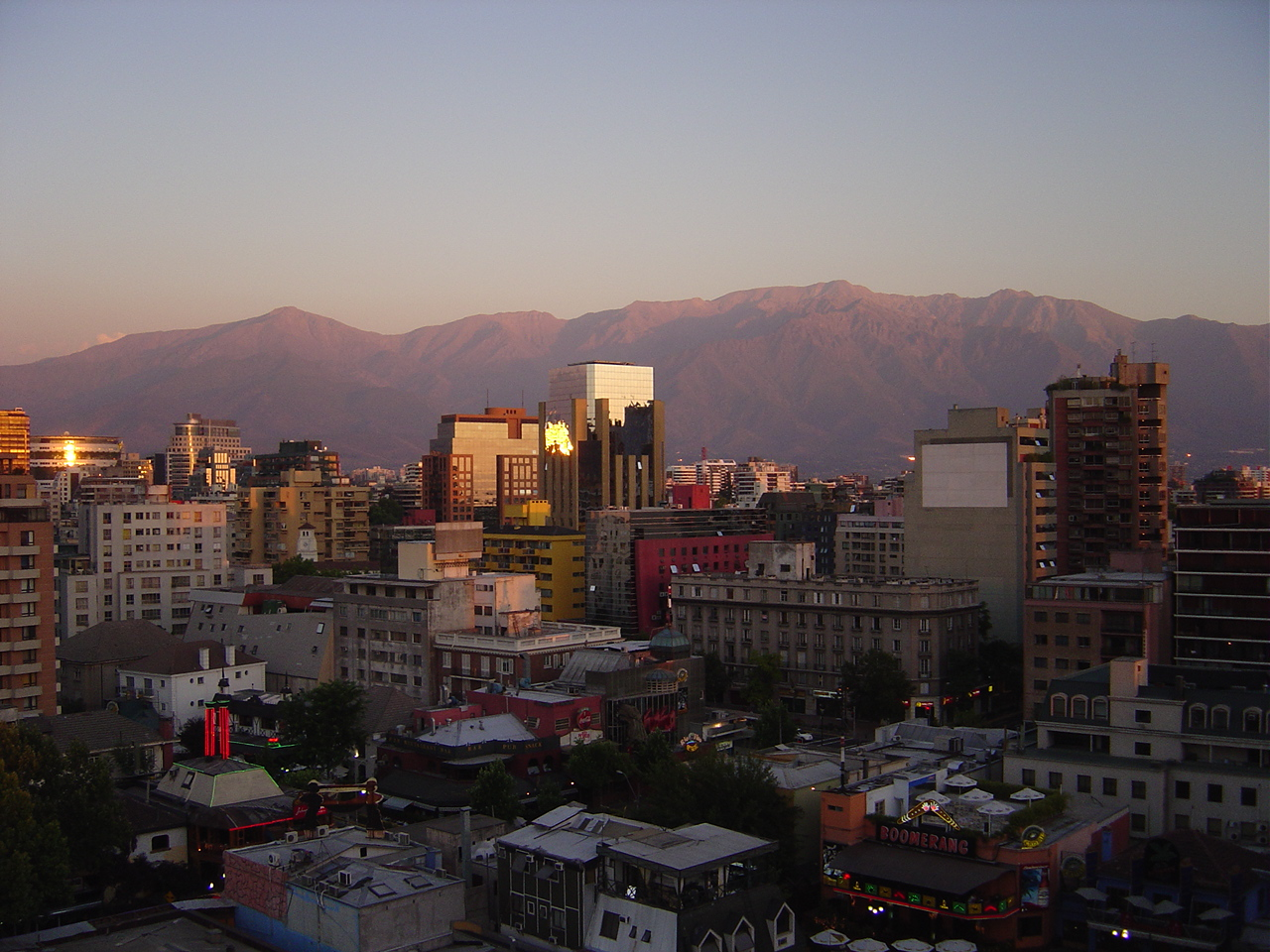
Santiago in the summer

=== Climate ===
Santiago has a cool semi-arid climate (BSk according to the Köppen climate classification), with Mediterranean (Csb) patterns, while the eastern areas, being closer to the mountain range, have a true Mediterranean climate (Csb): warm dry summers (October to March) with temperatures reaching up to 35 °C (95 °F) on the hottest days; winters (April to September) are cool with cool to cold mornings; typical daily maximum temperatures of 14 °C (57 °F), and low temperatures near 0 °C (32 °F). In climate station of Quinta Normal (near downtown) the precipitation average is 286.3 mm, and in climate station of Quebrada de Macul between the communes of Peñalolén and La Florida (in higher grounds near the Andes mountains) the precipitation average is 438 mm.

In the airport area of Pudahuel, mean rainfall is 276.9 millimeters (10.90 inches) per year, about 80% of which occurs during the winter months (May to September), varying between 50 and 80 mm (1.97 and 3.15 in) of rainfall during these months. That amount contrasts with a very sunny season during the summer months between December and March, when rainfall does not exceed 4 mm (0.16 in) on average, caused by an anticyclonic dominance continued for about seven or eight months. There is significant variation within the city, with rainfall at the lower-elevation Pudahuel site near the airport being about 20 percent lower than at the older Quinta Normal site near the city center.

Santiago's rainfall is highly variable and heavily influenced by the El Niño Southern Oscillation cycle, with rainy years coinciding with El Niño events and dry years with La Niña events. The wettest year since records began in 1866 was 1900 with 819.7 millimeters (32.27 in) – part of a "pluvial" from 1898 to 1905 that saw an average of 559.3 millimeters (22.02 in) over eight years incorporating the second wettest year in 1899 with 773.3 millimeters (30.44 in) – and the driest 1924 with 66.1 millimeters (2.60 in). Typically there are lengthy dry spells even in the rainiest of winters, intercepted with similarly lengthy periods of heavy rainfall. For instance, in 1987, the fourth wettest year on record with 712.1 millimeters (28.04 in), there was only 1.7 millimeters (0.07 in) in the 36 days between 3 June and 8 July, followed by 537.2 millimeters (21.15 in) in the 38 days between 9 July and 15 August.

Precipitation is usually only rain, as snowfall only occurs in the Andes and Precordillera, being rare in eastern districts, and extremely rare in the central and western districts of the city. In winter, the snow line is about 2,100 meters (6,890 ft), and it ranges from 1,500–2,900 meters (4,921–9,514 ft). The city is affected only occasionally by snowfall. The period between 2000 and 2017 has been registered 9 snowfalls and only two have been measured in the central Santiago (2007 and 2017). The amount of snow registered in Santiago on 15 July 2017 ranged between 3.0 cm in Quinta Normal and 10.0 cm in La Reina (Tobalaba).

Temperatures vary throughout the year from an average of 20 °C (68 °F) in January to 8 °C (46 °F) in June and July. In the summer days are very warm to hot, often reaching over 30 °C (86 °F) and a record high close to 38 °C (100 °F), while nights are very pleasant and cool, at 11 °C (52 °F). During autumn and winter the temperature drops, and is slightly lower than 10 °C (50 °F). The temperature may even drop to 0 °C (32 °F), especially during the morning. The historic low of −6.8 °C (20 °F) was in July 1976.

Santiago's location within a watershed is one of the most important factors determining the climate of the city. The coastal mountain range serves as a screen that stops the spread of maritime influence, contributing to the increase in annual and daily thermal oscillation (the difference between the maximum and minimum daily temperatures can reach 14 °C) and maintaining low relative humidity, close to an annual average of 70%. It also prevents the entry of air masses, with the exception of some coastal low clouds that penetrate to the basin through the river valleys.

Prevailing winds are from the southwest, with an average of 15 km/h (9 mph), especially during the summer; the winter is less windy.

Climate data for Quinta Normal, Santiago (1991–2020 normals, extremes 1911–present)
Month	Jan	Feb	Mar	Apr	May	Jun	Jul	Aug	Sep	Oct	Nov	Dec	Year
Record high °C (°F)	38.3 (100.9)	36.5 (97.7)	36.2 (97.2)	33.9 (93.0)	31.6 (88.9)	27.3 (81.1)	28.4 (83.1)	31.0 (87.8)	32.6 (90.7)	34.3 (93.7)	34.9 (94.8)	37.3 (99.1)	38.3 (100.9)
Mean daily maximum °C (°F)	30.4 (86.7)	29.7 (85.5)	27.9 (82.2)	23.3 (73.9)	19.2 (66.6)	16.0 (60.8)	15.7 (60.3)	17.6 (63.7)	20.1 (68.2)	23.1 (73.6)	26.6 (79.9)	29.0 (84.2)	23.2 (73.8)
Daily mean °C (°F)	22.0 (71.6)	21.4 (70.5)	19.7 (67.5)	16.1 (61.0)	12.9 (55.2)	10.4 (50.7)	9.8 (49.6)	11.2 (52.2)	13.5 (56.3)	15.8 (60.4)	18.5 (65.3)	20.6 (69.1)	16.0 (60.8)
Mean daily minimum °C (°F)	13.6 (56.5)	13.0 (55.4)	11.5 (52.7)	8.8 (47.8)	6.6 (43.9)	4.7 (40.5)	3.8 (38.8)	4.9 (40.8)	6.8 (44.2)	8.5 (47.3)	10.4 (50.7)	12.2 (54.0)	8.7 (47.7)
Record low °C (°F)	5.9 (42.6)	5.2 (41.4)	1.2 (34.2)	−2.5 (27.5)	−3.0 (26.6)	−4.2 (24.4)	−4.6 (23.7)	−3.4 (25.9)	−2.6 (27.3)	−4.3 (24.3)	1.6 (34.9)	1.0 (33.8)	−4.6 (23.7)
Average precipitation mm (inches)	0.6 (0.02)	1.3 (0.05)	4.1 (0.16)	17.5 (0.69)	42.6 (1.68)	80.4 (3.17)	50.4 (1.98)	44.1 (1.74)	25.3 (1.00)	12.1 (0.48)	4.9 (0.19)	3.0 (0.12)	286.3 (11.27)
Average precipitation days (≥ 1.0 mm)	0.1	0.2	0.5	1.8	3.5	5.2	4.1	3.4	2.8	1.3	0.5	0.4	23.9
Average relative humidity (%)	57	61	68	74	80	84	84	81	76	70	62	57	71
Mean monthly sunshine hours	328.6	287.8	258.1	188.6	137.8	110.8	129.2	151.2	171.8	230.3	278.1	324.8	2,597.1
Source 1: Dirección Meteorológica de Chile
Source 2: NOAA (precipitation days 1991–2020) Deutscher Wetterdienst (humidity 1961–1990)

Climate data for Arturo Merino Benítez International Airport, Pudahuel, Santiago (1991–2020, extremes 1966–present)
Month	Jan	Feb	Mar	Apr	May	Jun	Jul	Aug	Sep	Oct	Nov	Dec	Year
Record high °C (°F)	39.3 (102.7)	37.2 (99.0)	36.8 (98.2)	34.5 (94.1)	31.1 (88.0)	26.7 (80.1)	28.2 (82.8)	29.9 (85.8)	32.9 (91.2)	35.7 (96.3)	35.2 (95.4)	37.1 (98.8)	39.3 (102.7)
Mean daily maximum °C (°F)	30.2 (86.4)	29.7 (85.5)	28.0 (82.4)	23.3 (73.9)	19.0 (66.2)	15.5 (59.9)	15.0 (59.0)	16.8 (62.2)	19.4 (66.9)	22.7 (72.9)	26.3 (79.3)	28.7 (83.7)	22.9 (73.2)
Daily mean °C (°F)	21.4 (70.5)	20.7 (69.3)	18.9 (66.0)	15.0 (59.0)	11.5 (52.7)	8.8 (47.8)	8.2 (46.8)	9.7 (49.5)	12.1 (53.8)	14.8 (58.6)	17.8 (64.0)	20.0 (68.0)	14.9 (58.8)
Mean daily minimum °C (°F)	13.5 (56.3)	13.0 (55.4)	11.6 (52.9)	7.8 (46.0)	5.2 (41.4)	3.5 (38.3)	2.6 (36.7)	3.6 (38.5)	5.7 (42.3)	7.6 (45.7)	9.8 (49.6)	12.6 (54.7)	7.8 (46.0)
Record low °C (°F)	2.7 (36.9)	4.7 (40.5)	2.1 (35.8)	−2.6 (27.3)	−5.9 (21.4)	−6.5 (20.3)	−6.8 (19.8)	−6.2 (20.8)	−4.5 (23.9)	−2.8 (27.0)	0.7 (33.3)	3.3 (37.9)	−6.8 (19.8)
Average precipitation mm (inches)	0.3 (0.01)	0.9 (0.04)	3.4 (0.13)	13.4 (0.53)	32.6 (1.28)	68.8 (2.71)	53.0 (2.09)	35.1 (1.38)	17.1 (0.67)	8.4 (0.33)	3.7 (0.15)	2.2 (0.09)	221.5 (8.72)
Average precipitation days (≥ 1.0 mm)	0.1	0.1	0.4	1.6	3.3	5.0	3.8	3.3	2.3	1.1	0.5	0.3	21.7
Average relative humidity (%)	50	53	57	65	73	79	79	76	71	63	55	51	64
Mean monthly sunshine hours	366.1	315.5	290.0	212.7	158.6	125.5	145.1	169.2	190.7	259.1	309.5	346.4	2,888.4
Source 1: Dirección Meteorológica de Chile
Source 2: NOAA (precipitation days 1991–2020)

Climate data for Quebrada de Macul, Peñalolén, Santiago (2003–2015)
Month	Jan	Feb	Mar	Apr	May	Jun	Jul	Aug	Sep	Oct	Nov	Dec	Year
Mean daily maximum °C (°F)	27.5 (81.5)	27.1 (80.8)	24.8 (76.6)	20.4 (68.7)	16.7 (62.1)	15.7 (60.3)	14.3 (57.7)	15.4 (59.7)	18.0 (64.4)	18.9 (66.0)	22.0 (71.6)	25.6 (78.1)	20.5 (69.0)
Daily mean °C (°F)	20.4 (68.7)	19.9 (67.8)	18.4 (65.1)	14.7 (58.5)	11.4 (52.5)	11.0 (51.8)	9.5 (49.1)	10.4 (50.7)	12.3 (54.1)	13.6 (56.5)	16.2 (61.2)	18.6 (65.5)	14.7 (58.5)
Mean daily minimum °C (°F)	13.3 (55.9)	12.8 (55.0)	12.0 (53.6)	9.0 (48.2)	6.0 (42.8)	6.3 (43.3)	4.6 (40.3)	5.3 (41.5)	6.5 (43.7)	8.3 (46.9)	10.4 (50.7)	11.6 (52.9)	8.8 (47.9)
Average precipitation mm (inches)	1 (0.0)	6 (0.2)	13 (0.5)	13 (0.5)	51 (2.0)	82 (3.2)	75 (3.0)	111 (4.4)	43 (1.7)	23 (0.9)	20 (0.8)	0 (0)	438 (17.2)
Source: Atlas Agroclimático de Chile

=== Natural disasters ===
Santiago is located on the Pacific Ring of Fire, where two tectonic plates, the Nazca and South American Plates, collide. This results in a high frequency of earthquakes. The first recorded earthquake to hit Santiago was in 1575, just 34 years after its founding. The most devastating earthquake in the city's history took place in 1647, inspiring the novel The Earthquake In Chile by Heinrich von Kleist.

In response to the destructive earthquakes of 1960 (Valdivia) and 1985 (Algarrobo), Santiago implemented strict building codes to minimize damage from future earthquakes. In 2010, Chile was hit by the sixth largest recorded earthquake with a magnitude of 8.8 on the moment magnitude scale. The earthquake caused the death of 525 people, 13 of whom were in Santiago, and resulted in an estimated cost of 15–30 billion US dollars. Although many homes were damaged, the stricter building codes prevented the scale of destruction seen in the Haiti earthquake of the same year, in which over 100,000 people lost their lives. While large earthquakes pose a threat, smaller earthquakes from local faults in and around Santiago are also a significant risk. In particular, the San Ramón and El Arrayán faults in the east and north of the city are considered to be particularly dangerous.

In addition to seismic activity, Santiago is prone to hydrometeorological hazards. Heavy seasonal downpours and thermal anomalies occasionally trigger extreme weather events, such as torrential rains and flash floods. In October 2026, abnormal rainfall, exceeding nine times the typical monthly average, triggered severe flash floods and mudslides across eastern communes such as Las Condes, Peñalolén, and La Reina. The resulting inundations swept away vehicles, swamped infrastructure, caused localized overflows of the Mapocho River, and prompted disaster zone declarations and widespread emergency evacuations.

The eastern neighborhoods of Santiago are also susceptible to landslides, especially of the debris flow type, which pose a significant hazard to the area.

== Environmental issues ==
Santiago has a serious air pollution problem. Despite a decrease in air pollution in the 1990s, the level of pollution has not significantly improved since 2000. In fact, a study conducted by a Chilean university in 2010 showed that the pollution levels in Santiago had doubled since 2002. Particulate matter air pollution, specifically PM2.5 and PM10, frequently exceeds the standards set by the US Environmental Protection Agency and the World Health Organization, posing a significant threat to public health.

One of the major sources of air pollution in Santiago is the El Teniente copper mine smelter, which operates year-round. The government typically does not classify it as a local pollution source, as it is located just outside the reporting area of the Santiago Metropolitan Region, 110 kilometers from downtown.

During the winter months, thermal inversion can trap and concentrate smog and air pollution in the Central Valley.

However, Santiago has made significant progress in wastewater treatment, with the Mapocho Wastewater Treatment Plant beginning operations in 2012. This development increased the city's wastewater treatment capacity to 100%, making Santiago the first capital city in Latin America to achieve full coverage of potable water, sewerage, and municipal wastewater treatment.

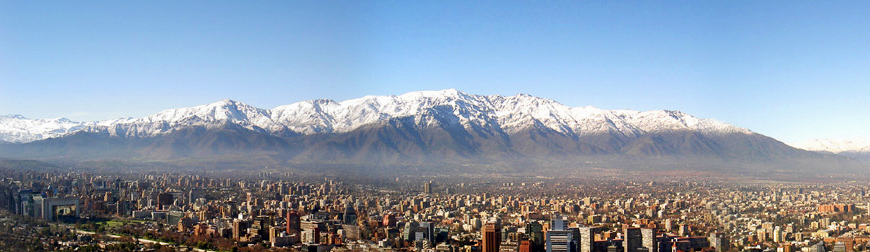
Panoramic view of northeastern Santiago, as seen from the hills of Parque Metropolitano in Providencia. Visible in the background are Apoquindo and Sierra de Ramón.

== Demographics ==
According to data collected in the 2002 census by the National Institute of Statistics, the Santiago metropolitan area population reached 5,428,590 inhabitants, equivalent to 35.9% of the national total and 89.6% of total regional inhabitants. This figure reflects broad growth in the population of the city during the 20th century: it had 383,587 inhabitants in 1907; 1,010,102 in 1940; 2,009,118 in 1960; 3,899,619 in 1982; and 4,729,118 in 1992. (percentage of total population, 2007)

Population of Santiago from 1820 to 2020 (projected).

The growth of Santiago has undergone several changes over the course of its history. In its early years, the city had a rate of growth 2.9% annually until the 17th century, then down to less than 2% per year until the early 20th century figures. During the 20th century, Santiago experienced a demographic explosion as it absorbed migration from mining camps in northern Chile during the economic crisis of the 1930s. The population surged again via migration from rural sectors between 1940 and 1960. This migration was coupled with high fertility rates, and annual growth reached 4.9% between 1952 and 1960. Growth has declined, reaching 1.4% in the early 2000s. The size of the city expanded constantly; The 20,000 hectares Santiago covered in 1960 doubled by 1980, reaching 64,140 hectares in 2002. The population density in Santiago is 8,464 inhabitants/km^{2}.

The population of Santiago has seen a steady increase in recent years. In 1990 the total population under 20 years was 38.0% and 8.9% were over 60. Estimates in 2007 show that 32.9% of men and 30.7% of women were less than 20 years old, while 10.2% of men and 13.4% of women were over 60 years. For the year 2020, it is estimated that the figures will be 26.7% and 16.8%.

4,313,719 people in Chile say they were born in one of the communes of the Santiago Metropolitan Region, which, according to the 2002 census, amounts to 28.5% of the national total. 67.6% of the inhabitants of Santiago claim to have been born in one of the communes of the metropolitan area. In communes such as Santiago Centro and Independencia, according to 2017 census, 1/3 of residents is a Latin American immigrant (28% and 31% of the population of these communes, respectively). Other communes of Greater Santiago with high numbers of immigrants are Estación Central (17%) and Recoleta (16%).

== Economy ==
Santiago is the industrial and financial center of Chile, and generates 45% of the country's GDP. Some international institutions, such as ECLAC (Economic Commission for Latin America and the Caribbean), have their offices in Santiago. The strong economy and low government debt is attracting migrants from Europe and the United States.

Santiago's steady economic growth over the past few decades has transformed it into a modern metropolis. The city is now home to a growing theater and restaurant scene, extensive suburban development, dozens of shopping centers, and a rising skyline, including the tallest building in Latin America, the Gran Torre Santiago. It includes several major universities, and has developed a modern transportation infrastructure, including a free flow toll-based, partly underground urban freeway system and the Metro de Santiago, South America's most extensive subway system.

Santiago is an economically divided city (Gini coefficient of 0.47). The western half of the city is, on average, much poorer than the eastern communes, where the high-standard public and private facilities are concentrated.

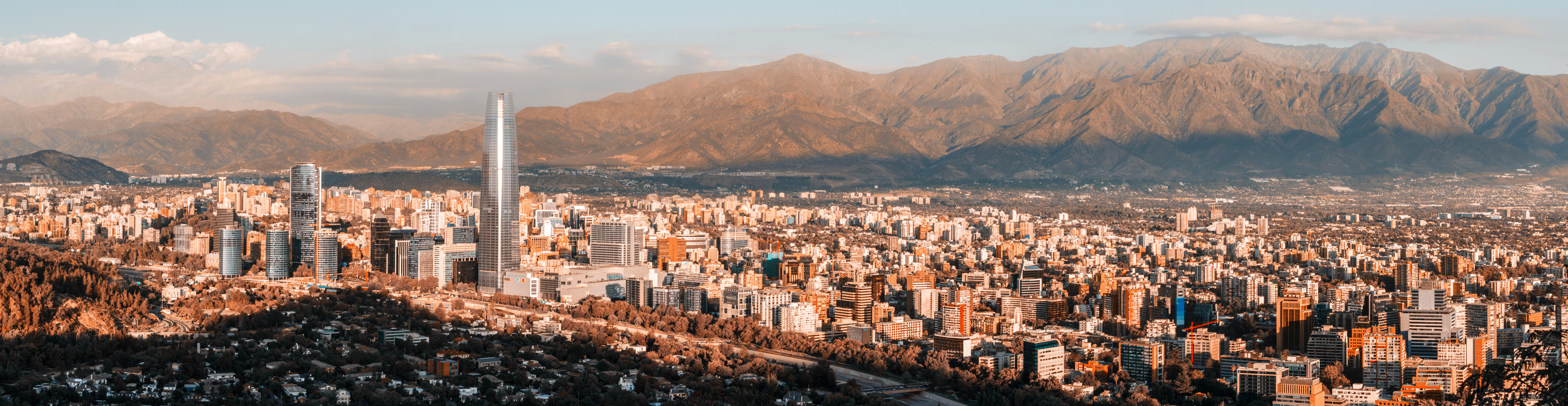
Panoramic view of the Costanera Center and the city, with the Andes Mountains in the distance.

=== Commercial development ===
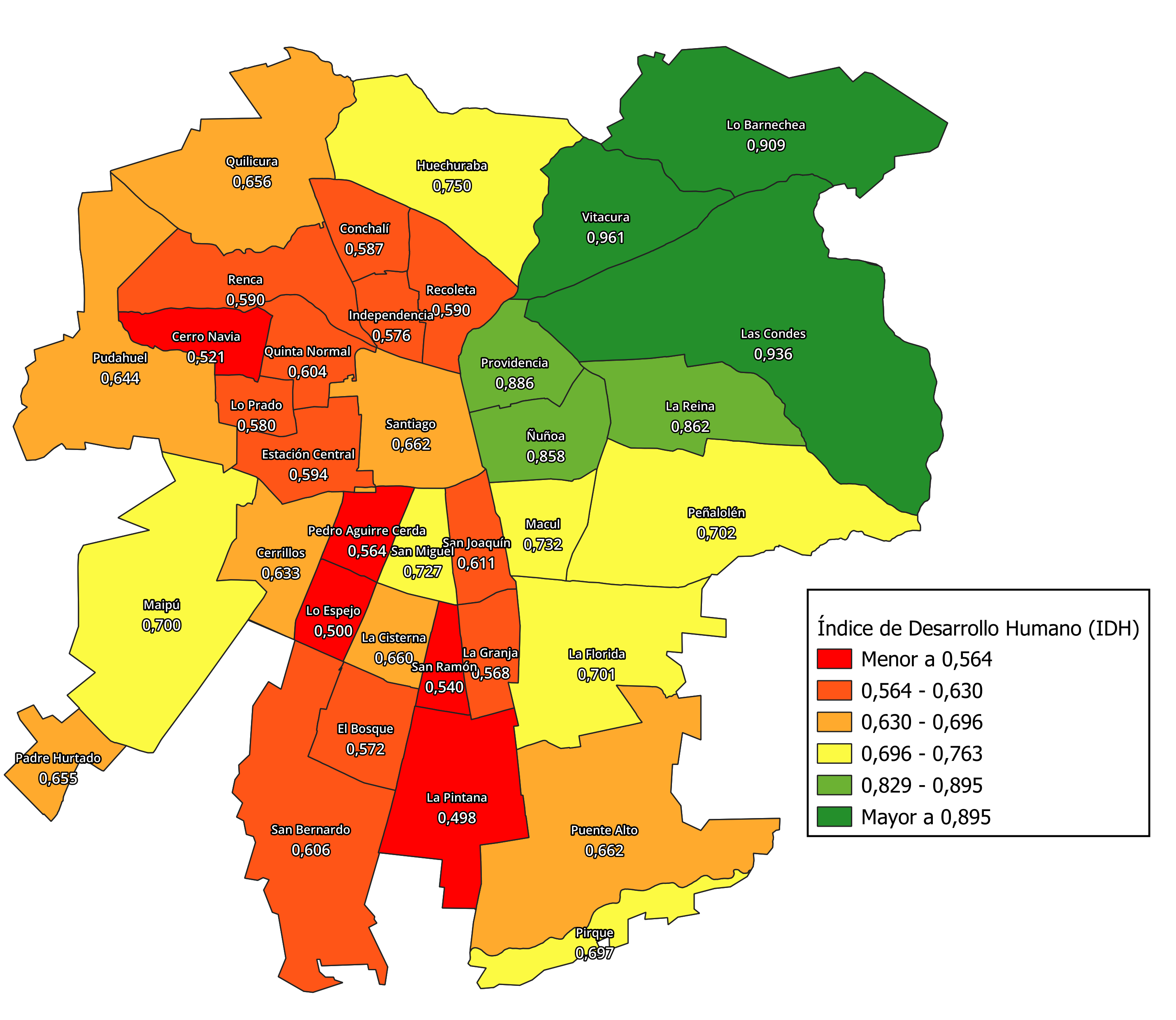
Santiago by Human Development Index on a commune-basis in 2022.

The Costanera Center, a mega project in Santiago's Financial District, includes a 280,000-square-meter (3,000,000 sq ft) mall, a 300-meter (980 ft) tower, two office towers of 170 meters (558 ft) each, and a hotel 105 meters (344 ft) tall. In January 2009 the retailer in charge, Cencosud, said in a statement that the construction of the mega-mall would gradually be reduced until financial uncertainty is cleared. In January 2010, Cencosud announced the restart of the project, and this was taken generally as a symbol of the country's success despite the Great Recession. Close to Costanera Center another skyscraper is already in use, Titanium La Portada, 190 meters (623 ft) tall. Although these are the two biggest projects, there are many other office buildings under construction in Santiago, as well as hundreds of high rise residential buildings. In February 2011, Gran Torre Santiago, part of the Costanera Center project, located in the called Sanhattan district, reached the 300-meter mark, officially becoming the tallest structure in Latin America.

=== Commerce ===
Santiago is Chile's retail capital. Falabella, Paris, Johnson, Ripley, La Polar, and several other department stores dot the mall landscape of Chile. The east side neighborhoods like Vitacura, La Dehesa, and Las Condes are home to Santiago's Alonso de Cordova street, and malls like Parque Arauco, Alto Las Condes, Mall Plaza and Costanera Center are known for their luxurious shopping. Alonso de Cordova, Santiago's equivalent to Rodeo Drive or Rua Oscar Freire in São Paulo, has exclusive stores like Louis Vuitton, Hermès, Emporio Armani, Salvatore Ferragamo, Ermenegildo Zegna, Swarovski, MaxMara, Longchamp, and others. Alonso de Cordova also houses some of Santiago's most famous restaurants, art galleries, wine showrooms and furniture stores. The Costanera Center has stores like Armani Exchange, Banana Republic, Façonnable, Hugo Boss, Swarovski, and Zara. Several mercados in the city such as the Mercado Central de Santiago sell local goods. Barrio Bellavista and Barrio Lastarria have some of the most exclusive night clubs, chic cafés and restaurants.

== Transportation ==
=== Air ===
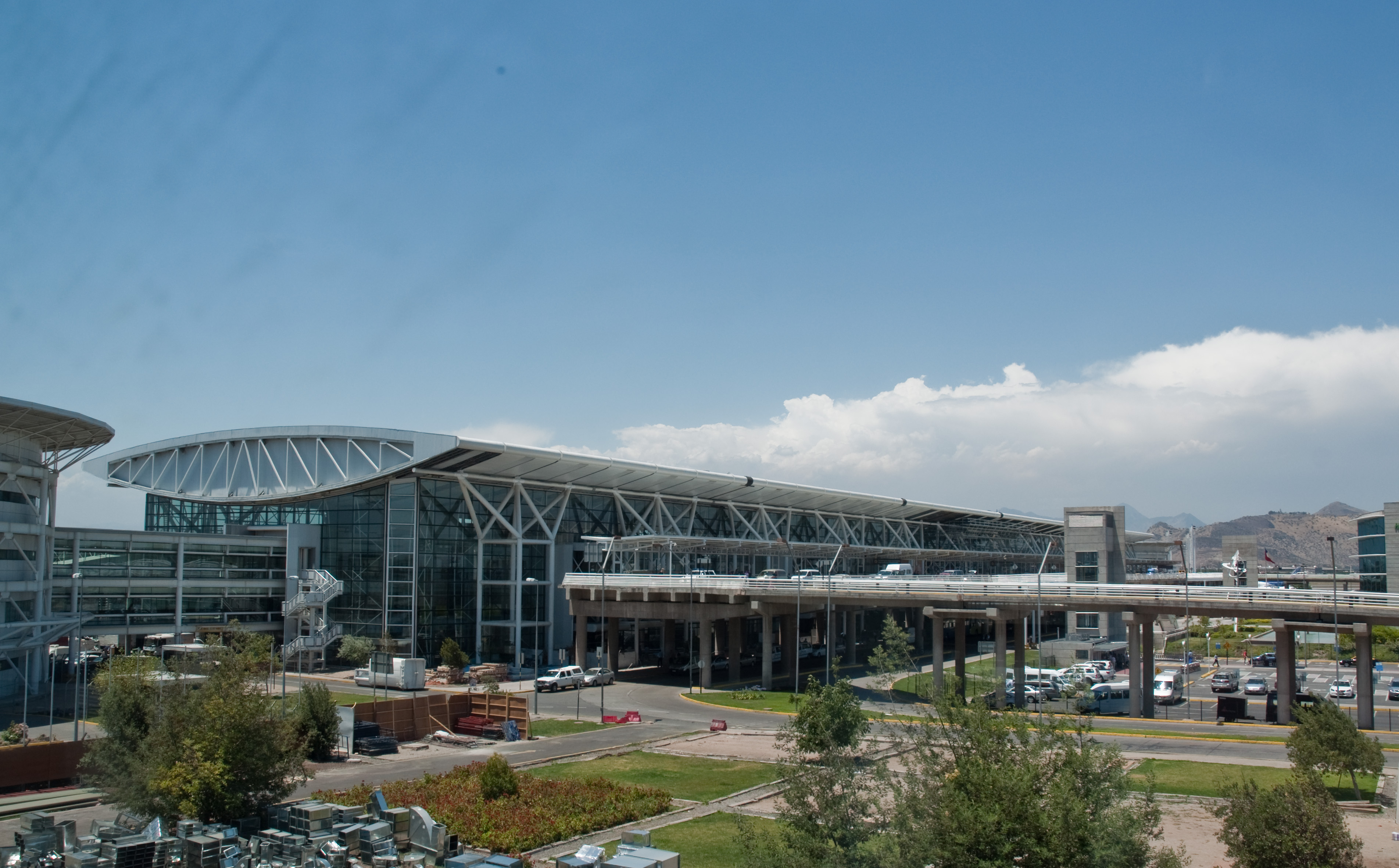
Arturo Merino Benítez International Airport

Arturo Merino Benítez International Airport (IATA: SCL) is Santiago's national and international airport and the principal hub of LATAM Airlines, Sky Airline, Aerocardal and JetSmart. The airport is located in the western commune of Pudahuel. The largest airport in Chile, it is ranked sixth in passenger traffic among Latin American airports, with 14,168,282 passengers served in 2012 – a 17% increase over 2011. It is located 15 km (9.3 mi) from the city center.

Peldehue airport in Colina began operations on 13 December 2021. It will be able to service up to 25 flights each hour. Santiago is also served by Eulogio Sánchez Airport (ICAO: SCTB), a small, privately owned general aviation airport in the commune of La Reina.

=== Rail ===
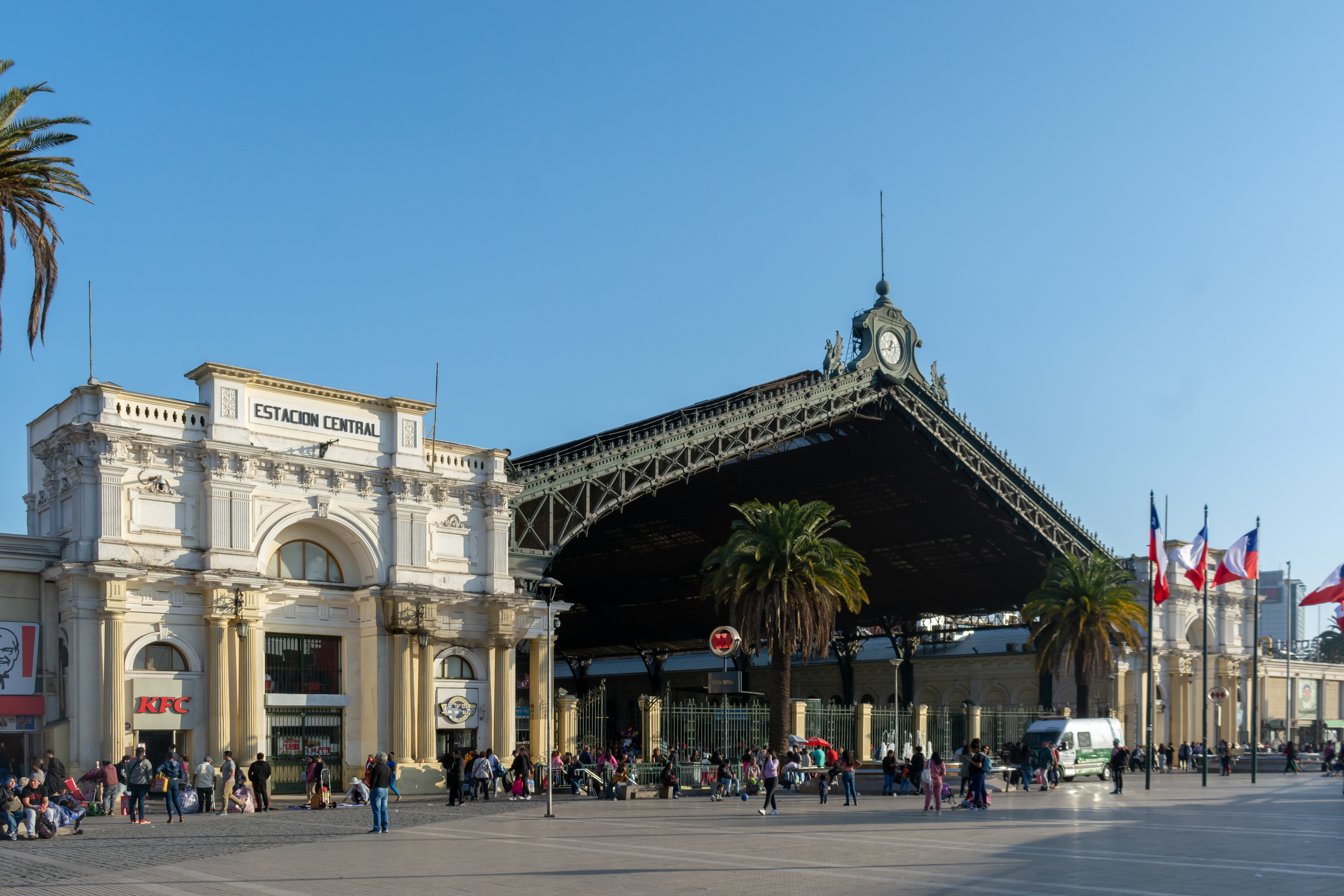
Estación Central de Santiago

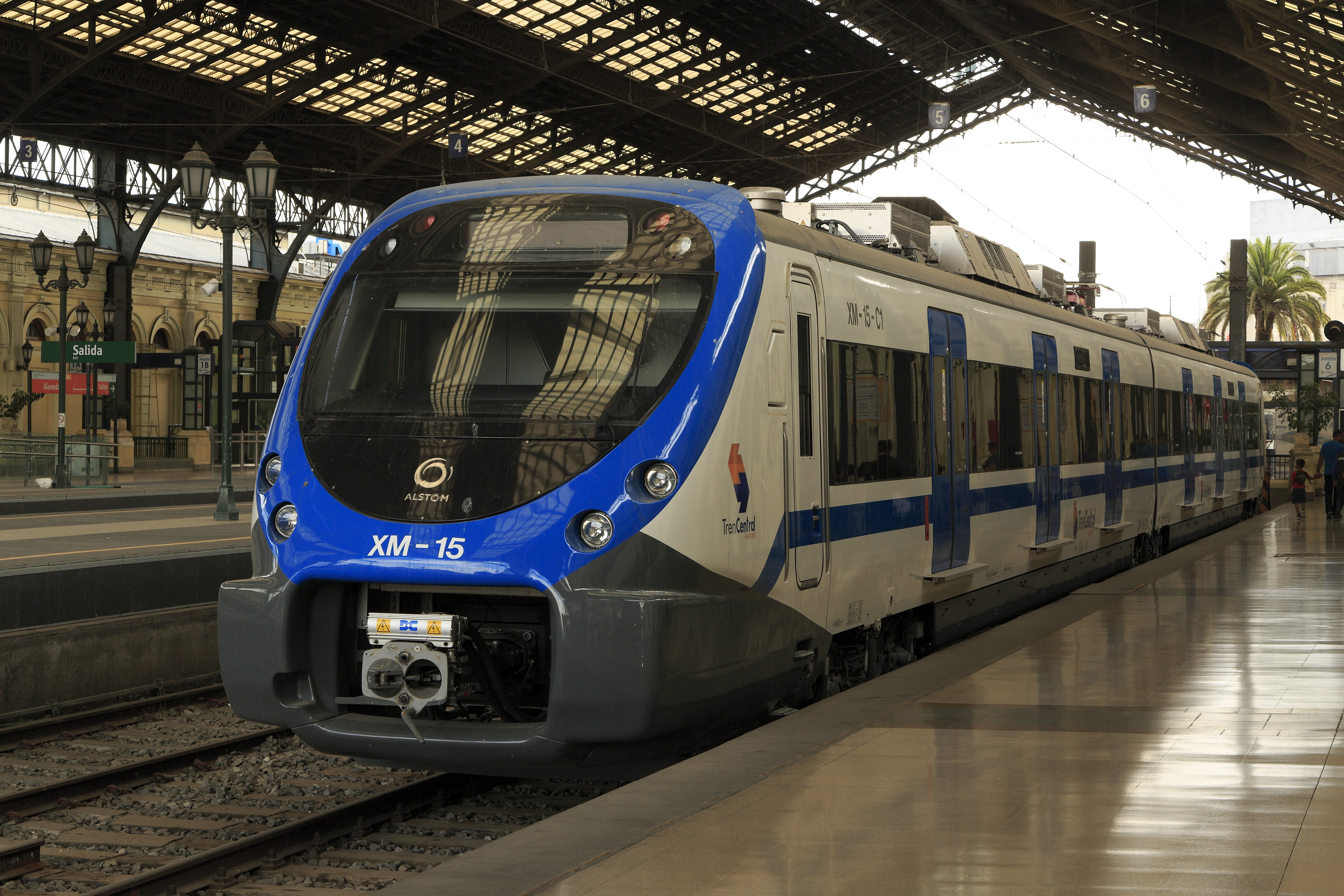
Empresa de los Ferrocarriles del Estado

Trains operated by Chile's national railway company, Empresa de los Ferrocarriles del Estado (EFE), connect Santiago to several cities in the south-central part of the country: Rancagua, San Fernando, Talca (connected to the coastal city of Constitución by a different train service), Linares and Chillán. All such trains arrive and depart from the Estación Central railway station (Central Station), which can be accessed by bus or subway. The proposed Santiago–Valparaíso railway line would connect Santiago with Valparaíso in 45 minutes, and expansions of the commuter rail network to Melipilla and Batuco are under discussion.

=== Inter-urban buses ===
Bus companies provide passenger transportation from Santiago to most areas of the country as well as to foreign destinations, while some also provide parcel shipping and delivery services.

There are several bus terminals in Santiago:

- Terminal San Borja: located in Estación Central metro station. Provides buses to all destinations in Chile and to some towns around Santiago.
- Terminal Alameda: located in Universidad de Santiago metro station. Provides buses to all destinations in Chile.
- Terminal Santiago: located one block west of Terminal Alameda. Provides buses to all destinations in Chile as well as to destinations in most countries in South America, except Bolivia.
- Terrapuerto Los Héroes: located two blocks east of Los Héroes metro station. Provides buses to south of Chile and some northern cities, as well as Argentina (Mendoza and Buenos Aires) and Paraguay (Asunción).
- Terminal Pajaritos: located in Pajaritos metro station. Provides buses to the international airport, inter-regional services to Valparaíso, Viña del Mar and several other coastal cities and towns.
- Terminal La Cisterna: located in La Cisterna metro station. Provides buses to towns around southern Santiago, Viña del Mar, Temuco and Puerto Montt.
- Terminal La Paz: located about two blocks away from La Vega Central Market; the closest Metro station is Puente Cal y Canto. It connects the rural areas north of Santiago.

=== Highways ===
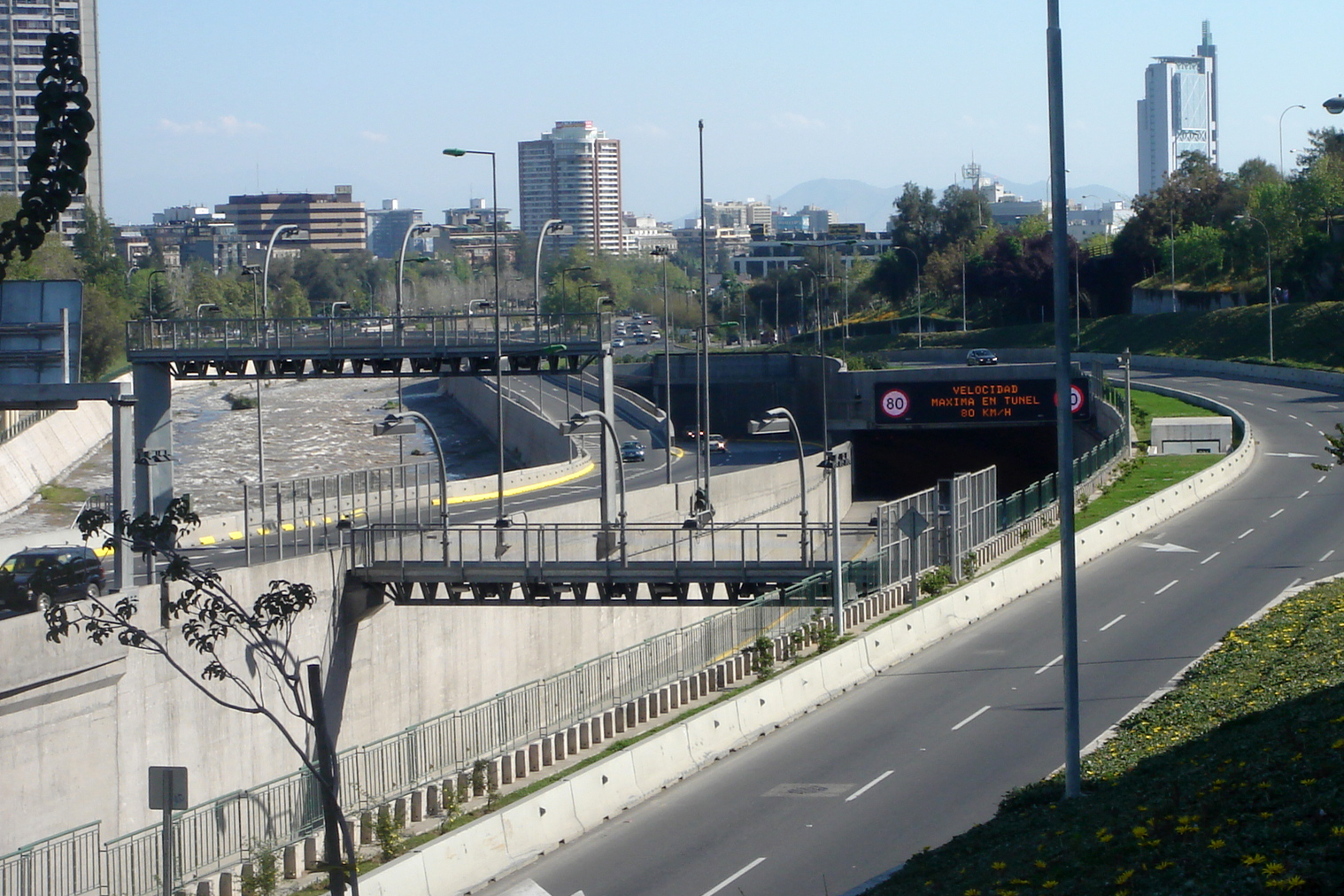
Costanera Norte Expressway

A network of free flow toll highways connects the various areas of the city. They include the Vespucio Norte and Vespucio Sur highways, which surround the city completing a nearly full circle; Autopista Central, the section of the Pan American highway crossing the city from north to south, divided in two highways 3 km (1.9 mi) apart; and the Costanera Norte, running next to the Mapocho River and connecting the international airport with the downtown and with the wealthier areas of the city to the east, where it divides into two highways.

Other free flow toll roads connecting Santiago to other cities, include: Rutas del Pacífico (Ruta 68), the continuation of the Alameda Libertador General Bernardo O'Higgins Avenue to the west, provides direct access to Valparaíso and Viña del Mar; Autopista del Sol (Ruta 78), connects Melipilla and the port of San Antonio with the capital; Autopista Ruta del Maipo (a.k.a. "Acceso Sur") is an alternative to the Pan American highway to access the various localities south of Santiago; Autopista Los Libertadores provides access to the main border crossing to Argentina, via Colina and Los Andes; and Autopista Nororiente, which provides access to the suburban development known as Chicureo, north of the capital.

=== Public transportation ===
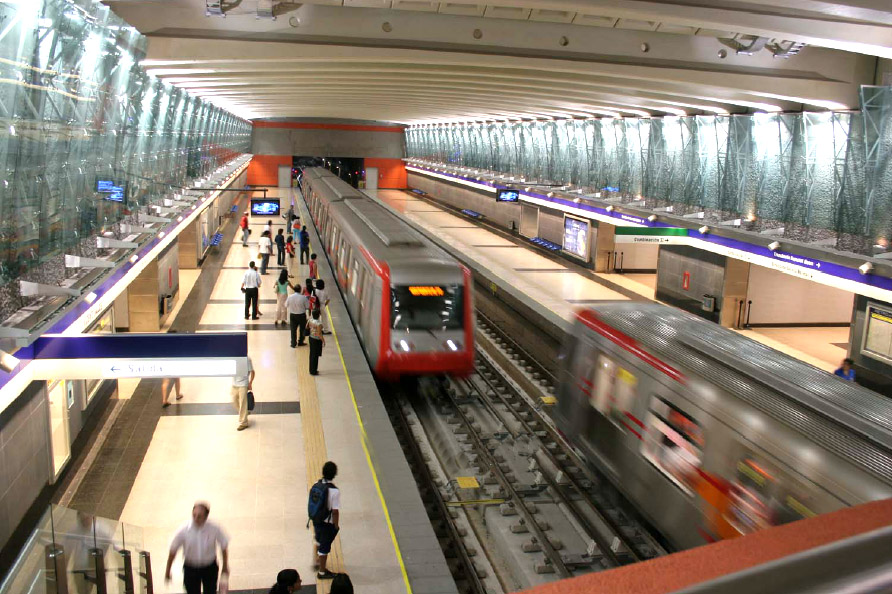
Vicente Valdés station

Santiago has 37% of Chile's vehicles, totaling 991,838, of which 979,346 are motorized. An extensive network of streets and avenues crisscrosses Santiago, facilitating travel between the different communities that make up the metropolitan area.

In the 1990s, the government attempted to reorganize the public transportation system. New routes were introduced in 1994, and the buses were painted yellow. However, the system faced significant issues such as route overlaps, high levels of air and noise pollution, and safety concerns for both riders and drivers. To address these problems, a new transportation system called Transantiago was devised. It was officially launched on February 10, 2007, combining core services across the city with the subway and local feeder routes, all under a unified payment system using a contactless smartcard called Tarjeta bip!.

The change was not well received by users, who complained of a lack of buses, excessive transfers between buses, and reduced coverage. While some of these issues were eventually addressed, the system developed a poor reputation that it struggled to overcome. As of 2011, fare evasion remained persistently high.

In 2019, the government rebranded the public transportation system as RED, aiming to distance it from the problematic Transantiago brand.

Santiago Metro map as September, 2023

==== Metro ====
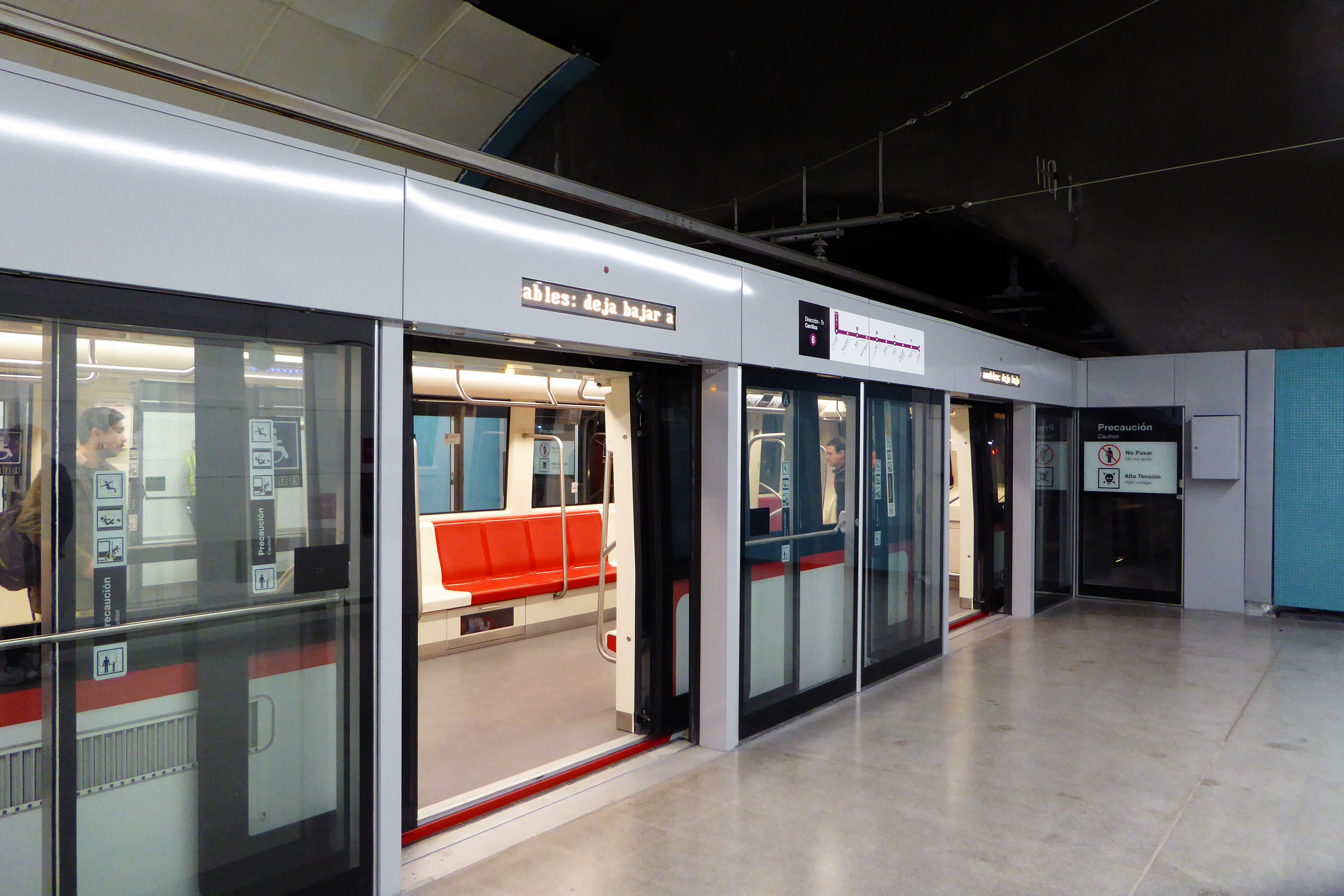
Los Leones station

Santiago Metro has seven operating lines (1, 2, 3, 4, 4A, 5 and 6), extending over 149 km (93 mi) and connecting 143 stations. The system carries around 2,400,000 passengers per day. Two underground lines (Line 4 and 4A) and an extension of Line 2 were inaugurated in 2005 and 2006, while an extension of Line 5 was inaugurated in 2011. Line 6 was inaugurated in 2017, adding 10 stations to the network and approximately 15 km (9.3 mi) of track. Line 3 opened on 22 January 2019, with 18 new stations. In 2023 Line 2 expanded with 4 new stations, and Line 3 by 3.

==== Commuter rail ====
EFE provides suburban rail service under the brandname of Metrotren. There are 2 southbound routes. The most popular is the Metrotren Nos service, between the Central Station of Santiago and Nos station, in San Bernardo. This line, inaugurated in 2017, serves 8 million people per year, with 12 trains serving 10 stations with a frequency of 6 minutes during rush hours, and 12 during the rest of the time. The other route is the Metrotren Rancagua service, between the Central Station of Santiago and the Rancagua station, connecting Santiago with the regional capital of O'Higgins.

==== Bus ====
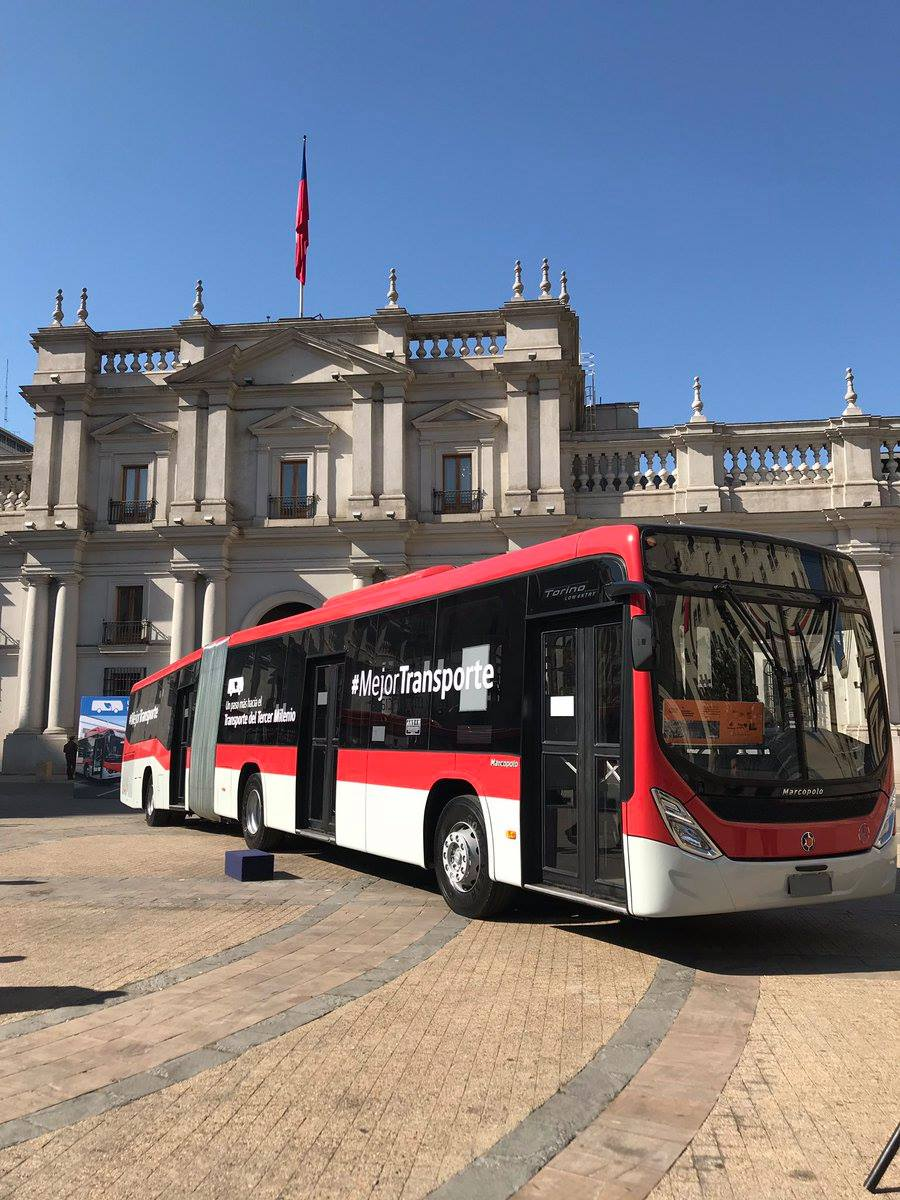

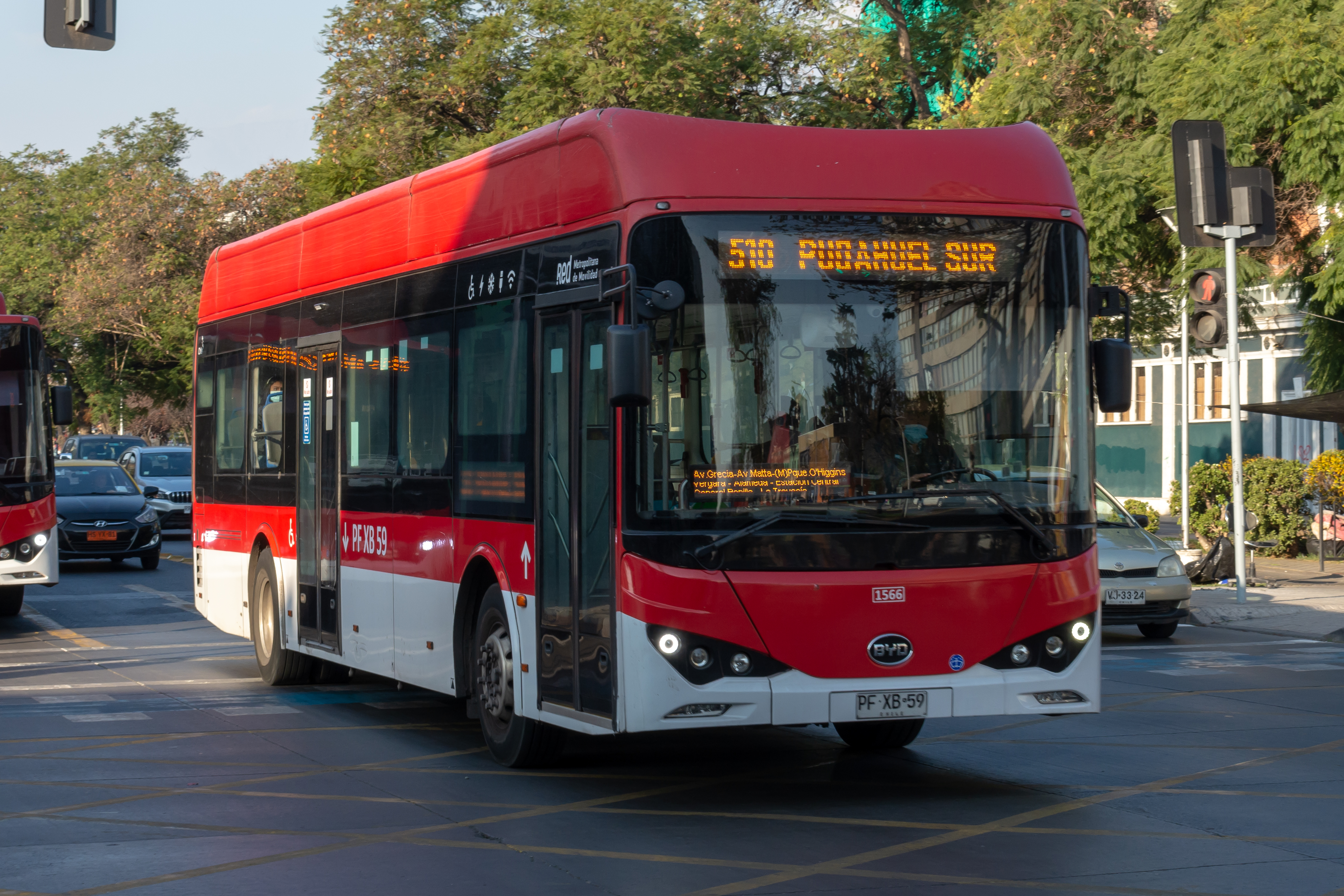
Red Metropolitana de Movilidad buses, using current color scheme.

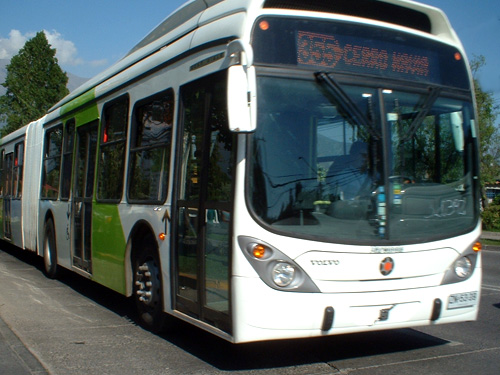
Transantiago bus, with original color scheme (2005–2012)

Red (formerly known as Transantiago) is the name of Santiago's comprehensive public transportation system. It operates by integrating local feeder bus lines, main bus lines, EFE commuter trains, and the metro network. The system features an integrated fare system that enables passengers to make transfers between bus, metro, and train services using a single, contactless smartcard known as Bip!. Additionally, it offers reduced fares for senior citizens, high school students, and university students.

==== Vehicles for hire ====
Taxicabs are prevalent in Santiago and are easily recognizable by their black bodies and yellow roofs, as well as their orange license plates. Another type of taxi called radiotaxis can be ordered by phone and can come in any make, model, or color, but must always have the orange license plates. Colectivos are shared taxis that follow a specific route and charge a fixed fee for the ride.

Cabify, Uber and DiDi are also available in Santiago, though authorities warn they currently operate outside the law.

==== Public transportation statistics ====
The average amount of time people spend commuting with public transit in Santiago - to and from work, for example - on a weekday is 53 min. Just 4.3% of public transit riders ride for more than 2 hours every day. The average amount of time people wait at a stop or station for public transit (considering transfers) is 14 min, while 17.4% of riders wait less than 5 minutes on average every day. The average distance people usually ride in a single trip with public transit is 8.03 km, while 18% travel for over 12 km in a single direction.

==== Cycling ====
Between 2012 and 2023, cycling in Santiago shifted from a marginal to a consolidated mode of urban transport. According to mobility surveys, the share of trips made by bicycle increased from around 4% in 2012 to approximately 7.8% by 2023, overpassing cities such as London, equivalent to about 1.5 million daily trips. This growth coincided with a sustained expansion of cycling infrastructure, particularly after 2015, when national and metropolitan programs accelerated the construction of bike lanes. By 2025, Santiago had the largest cycling networks in Latin America, although its continuity and design quality still vary significantly between communes. Dedicated bike lanes have reduced conflicts with motor traffic and pedestrians, yet many cyclists continue to ride in mixed traffic where the network remains fragmented. Helmet and light use are mandatory in Chile.

=== Internal transportation ===
Map of Santiago depicting main streets and airport.

As of 2006, Santiago was home to 992,000 vehicles, 979,000 of which were motorized. This made up 37.3% of Chile's total vehicle count. 805,000 cars passed through the city, which is 37.6% of the national total or one car for every seven people.

The main road is the Avenida Libertador General Bernardo O'Higgins, better known as Alameda Avenue, which runs northeast and southwest. From north to south, it is crossed by Autopista Central and the Independencia, Gran Avenida, Recoleta, Santa Rosa, Vicuña Mackenna and Tobalaba avenues. Other major roads include the Avenida Los Pajaritos to the west and Providencia Avenue and Apoquindo Avenue to the east. Finally, the Américo Vespucio Avenue acts as a ring road.

During the 2000s, several urban highways were built through Santiago in order to improve the situation for vehicles. The road General Velásquez and sections of the Pan-American Highway in Santiago were converted into the Autopista Central, while Américo Vespucio became variously the highways Vespucio Norte Express and Vespucio Sur, as well as Vespucio Oriente in the future. Following the edge of the Mapocho River, Costanera Norte was built to link the northeast of the capital to the airport and the downtown area. All these highways, totaling 210 km in length, have a free flow toll system.

== Administrative divisions ==
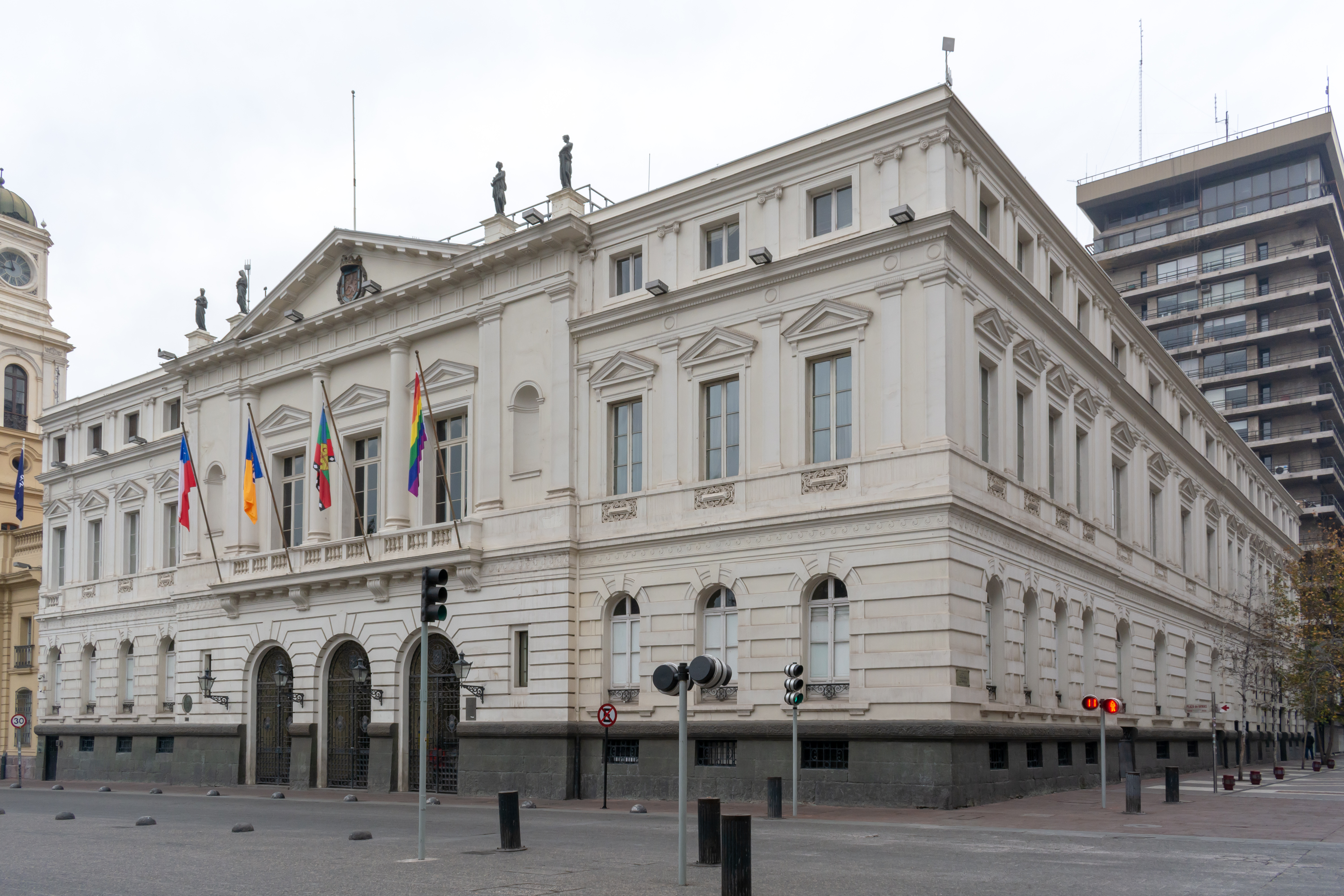
City Hall of Santiago

Greater Santiago lacks a metropolitan government for its administration, which is distributed between authorities, complicating the operation of the city as a single entity. The highest authorities in Santiago are considered to be the governor of the Santiago Metropolitan Region, who is popularly elected to the office, now held by Claudio Orrego, and the regional presidential delegate of Santiago Metropolitan Region, an official appointed by the president of Chile.

The conurbation of Greater Santiago does not fit perfectly into any administrative division, as it extends into four different provinces and 35 communes plus 11 satellite communes which together make the Santiago Metropolitan Area. The majority of its 641.4 km^{2} (247.65 sq mi) (as of 2002) lie within Santiago Province, with some peripheral areas contained in the provinces of Cordillera, Maipo, and Talagante.

Although there is no official consensus in this regard, the communes of the city are usually grouped into seven sectors: north, center, northeast, southeast, south, northwest and southwest.

Map of Santiago communes

Note: Communes in the peripheries are not shown to their full extent.

Communes of Santiago Province

Santiago Centro
Cerrillos
Cerro Navia
Conchalí
El Bosque
Estación Central
Huechuraba
Independencia
La Cisterna
La Florida
La Granja

La Pintana
La Reina
Las Condes
Lo Barnechea
Lo Espejo
Lo Prado
Macul
Maipú
Ñuñoa
Pedro Aguirre Cerda
Peñalolén

Providencia
Pudahuel
Quilicura
Quinta Normal
Recoleta
Renca
San Joaquín
San Miguel
San Ramón
Vitacura

Communes in other provinces

Padre Hurtado
Pirque

Puente Alto
San Bernardo

San José de Maipo

== Culture ==
Only a few historical buildings from the Spanish colonial period remain in the city, because – like the rest of the country – Santiago is regularly hit by earthquakes. Extant buildings include the Casa Colorada (1769), the San Francisco Church (1586), and Posada del Corregidor (1750).

The cathedral on the central square (Plaza de Armas) is a sight that ranks as high as the Palacio de La Moneda, the Presidential Palace. The original building was built between 1784 and 1805, and architect Joaquín Toesca was in charge of its construction. Other buildings surrounding the Plaza de Armas are the Central Post Office Building, which was finished in 1882, and the Palacio de la Real Audiencia de Santiago, built between 1804 and 1807. It houses the Chilean National History Museum, with 12,000 objects that can be exhibited. On the southeast corner of the square stands the green cast-iron Commercial Edwards building, which was built in 1893. East of that is the colonial building of the Casa Colorada (1769), which houses the Museum of Santiago. Close by is the Municipal Theater of Santiago, which was built in 1857 by the French architect Brunet of Edward Baines. It was badly damaged by an earthquake in 1906. Not far from the theater is the Subercaseaux Mansion and the National Library, one of the largest libraries of South America.

The Former National Congress Building, the Justice Palace, and the Royal Customs Palace (Palacio de la Real Aduana de Santiago) are located close to each other. The latter houses the Museum of pre-Columbian art. A fire destroyed the building of the Congress in 1895, which was then rebuilt in a neoclassical style and reopened in 1901. The Congress was deposed under the military dictatorship (1973–89) of Augusto Pinochet, and after the dictatorship was newly constituted on 11 March 1990, in Valparaíso.

The building of the Justice Palace (Palacio de Tribunales) is located on the south side of the Montt Square. It was designed by the architect Emilio Doyére and built between 1907 and 1926. The building is home to the Supreme Court of Chile. The panel of 21 judges is the highest judicial power in Chile. The building is also the headquarters of the Court of Appeals of Santiago.

Bandera street leads toward the building of the Santiago Stock Exchange (the Bolsa de Comercio), completed in 1917, the Club de la Unión (opened in 1925), the Universidad de Chile (1872), and toward the oldest churchhouse in the city, the San Francisco Church (constructed between 1586 and 1628), with its Marian statue of the Virgen del Socorro ("Our Lady of Help"), which was brought to Chile by Pedro de Valdivia. North of the Plaza de Armas ("Square of Arms", where the colonial militia was mustered) are the Paseo Puente, the Santo Domingo Church (1771), and the Central Market (Mercado Central), an ornamental iron building. Also in downtown Santiago is the Torre Entel, a 127.4-meter-high television tower with observation deck completed in 1974; the tower serves as a communication center for the communications company, ENTEL Chile.

The Costanera Center was completed in 2009, and includes housing, shopping, and entertainment venues. The project, with a total area of 600,000 square meters, includes the 300-meter high Gran Torre Santiago (South America's tallest building) and other commercial buildings. The four office towers are served by highway and subway connections.

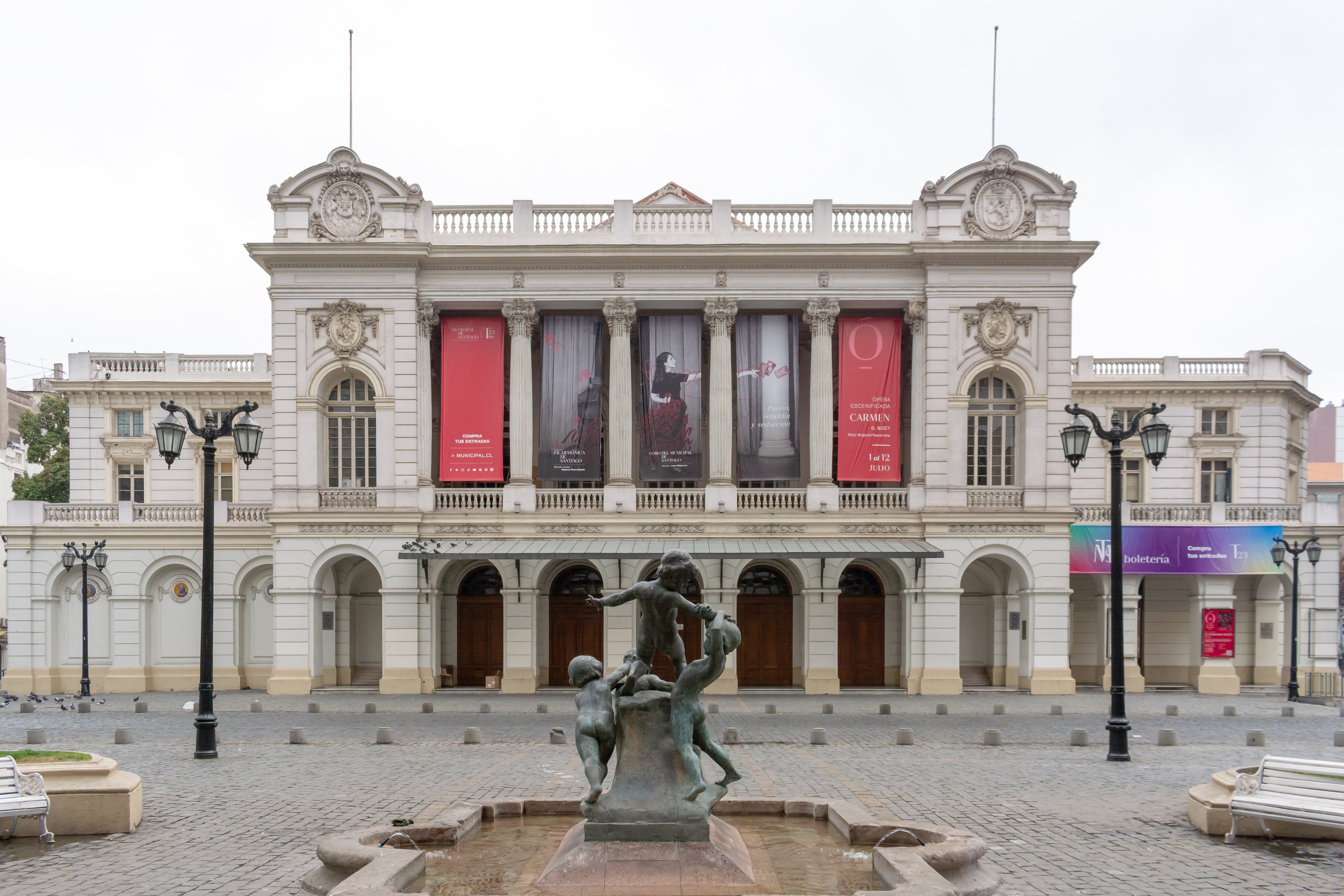
Municipal Theater of Santiago

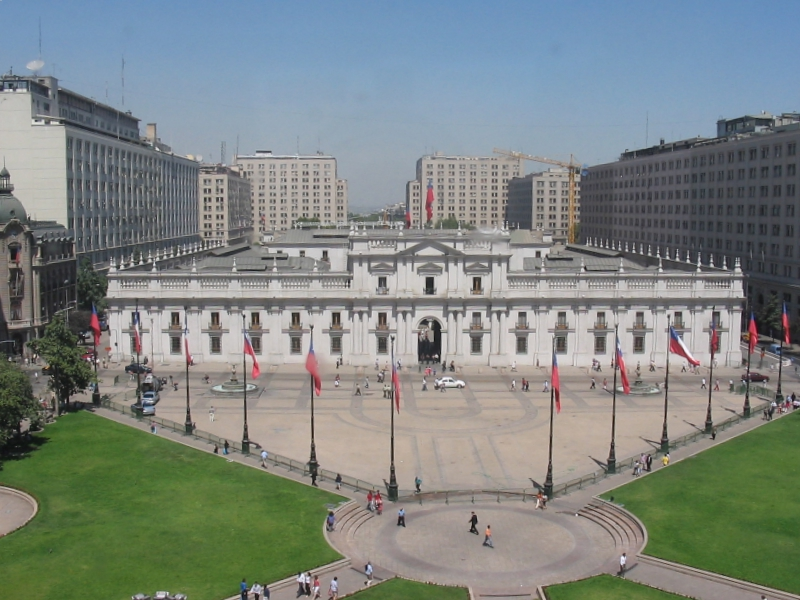
Palacio de La Moneda

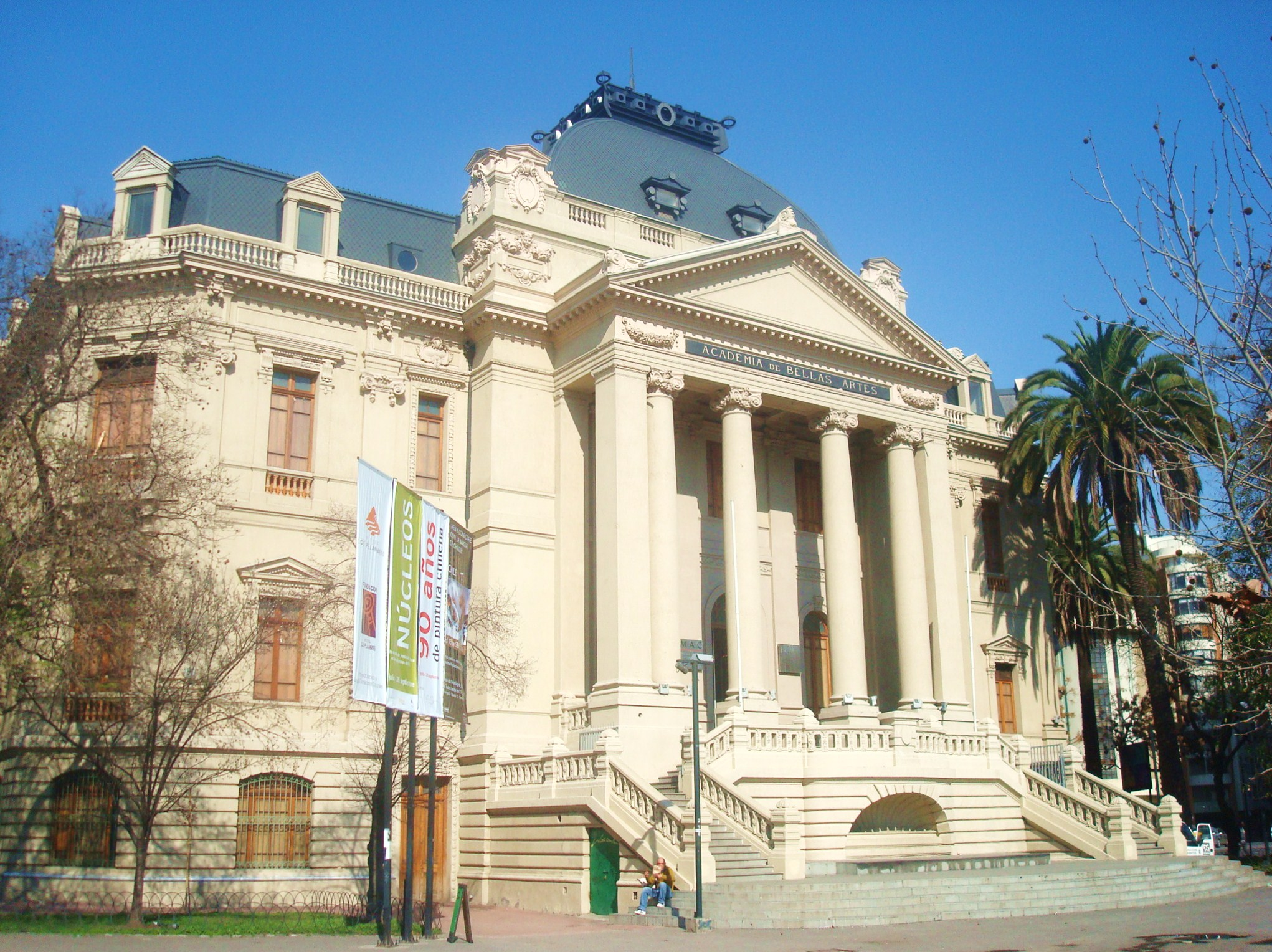
Contemporary Art Museum of Santiago

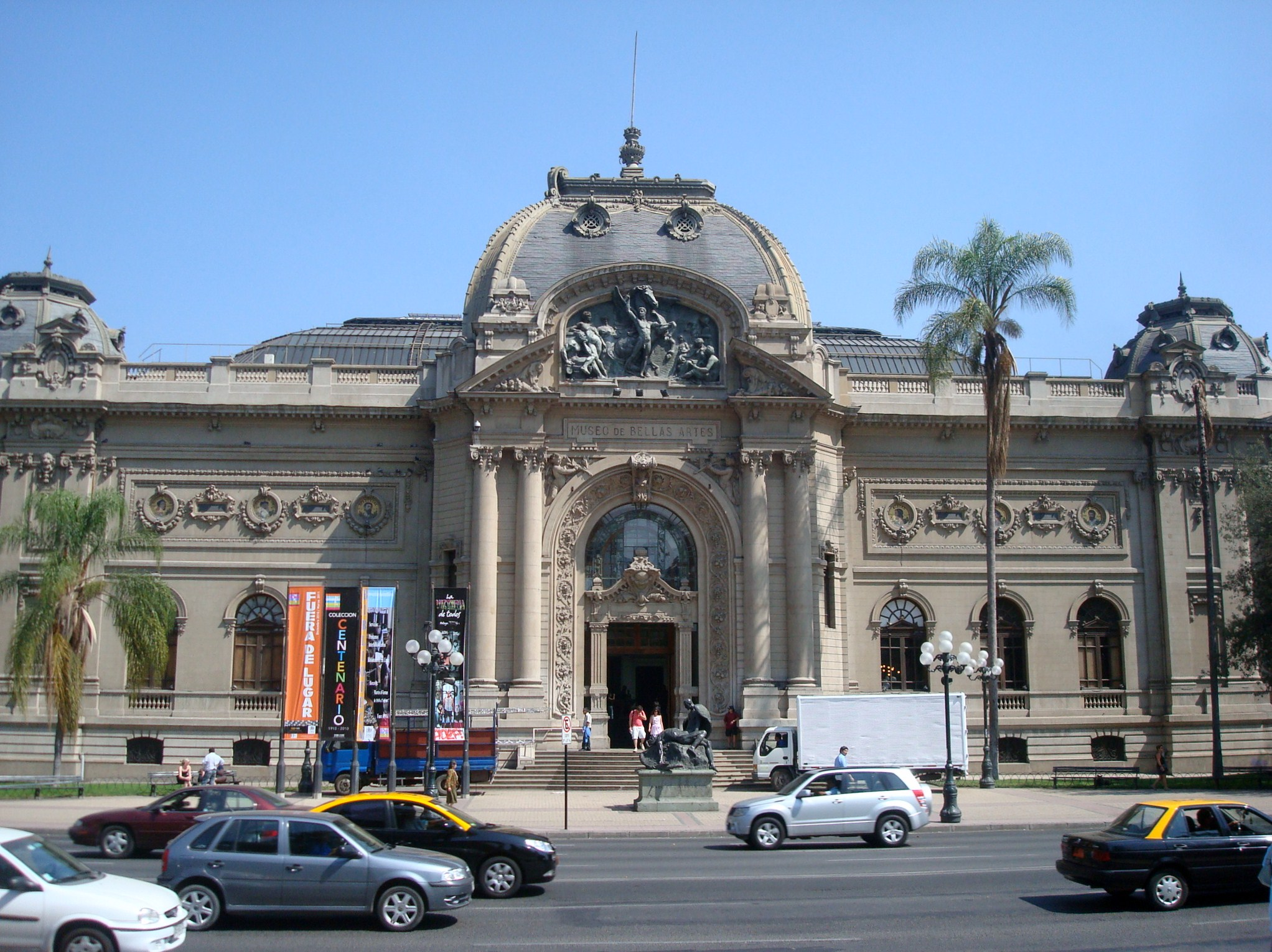
The National Museum of Fine Arts, located next to Parque Forestal.

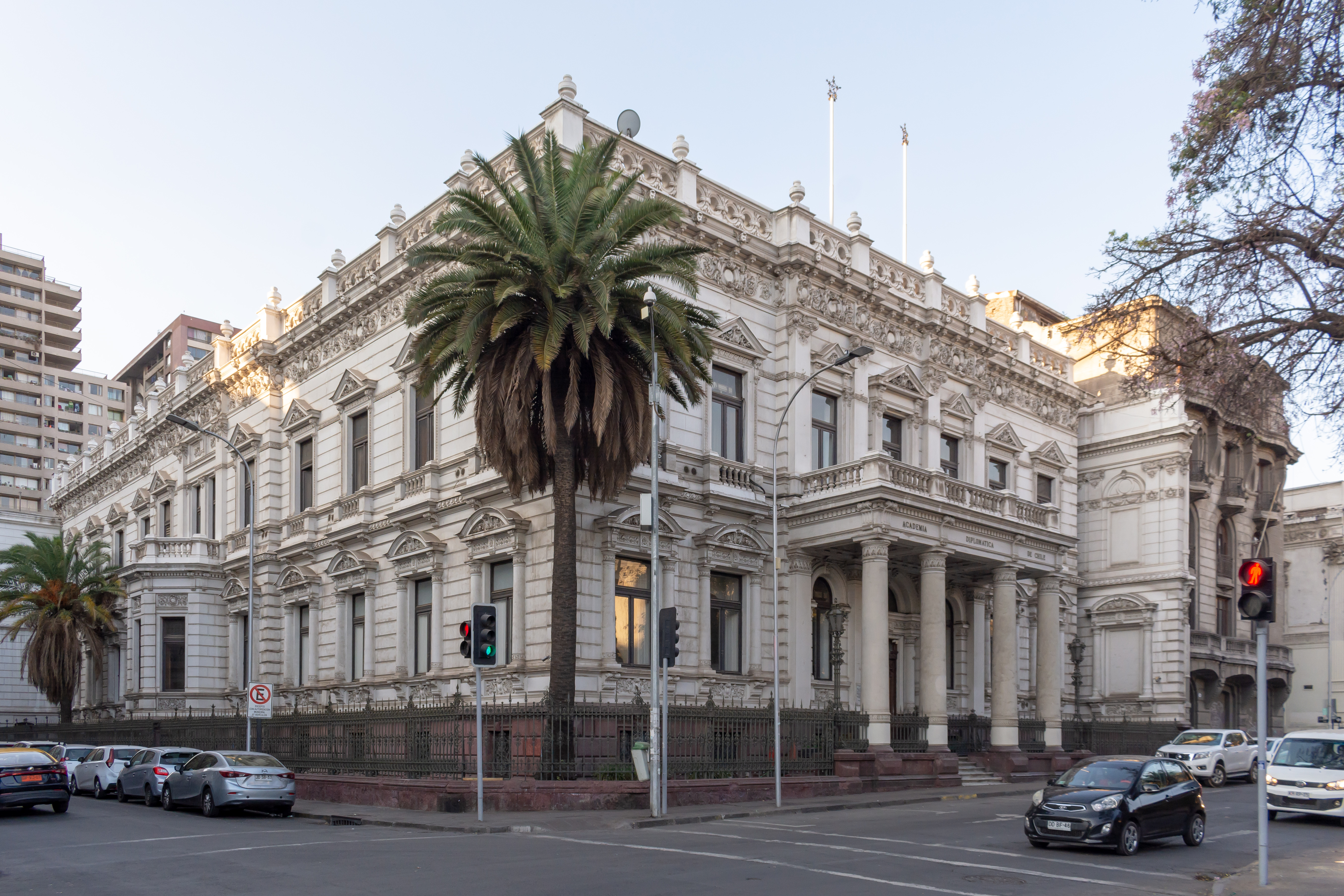
Palacio Edwards

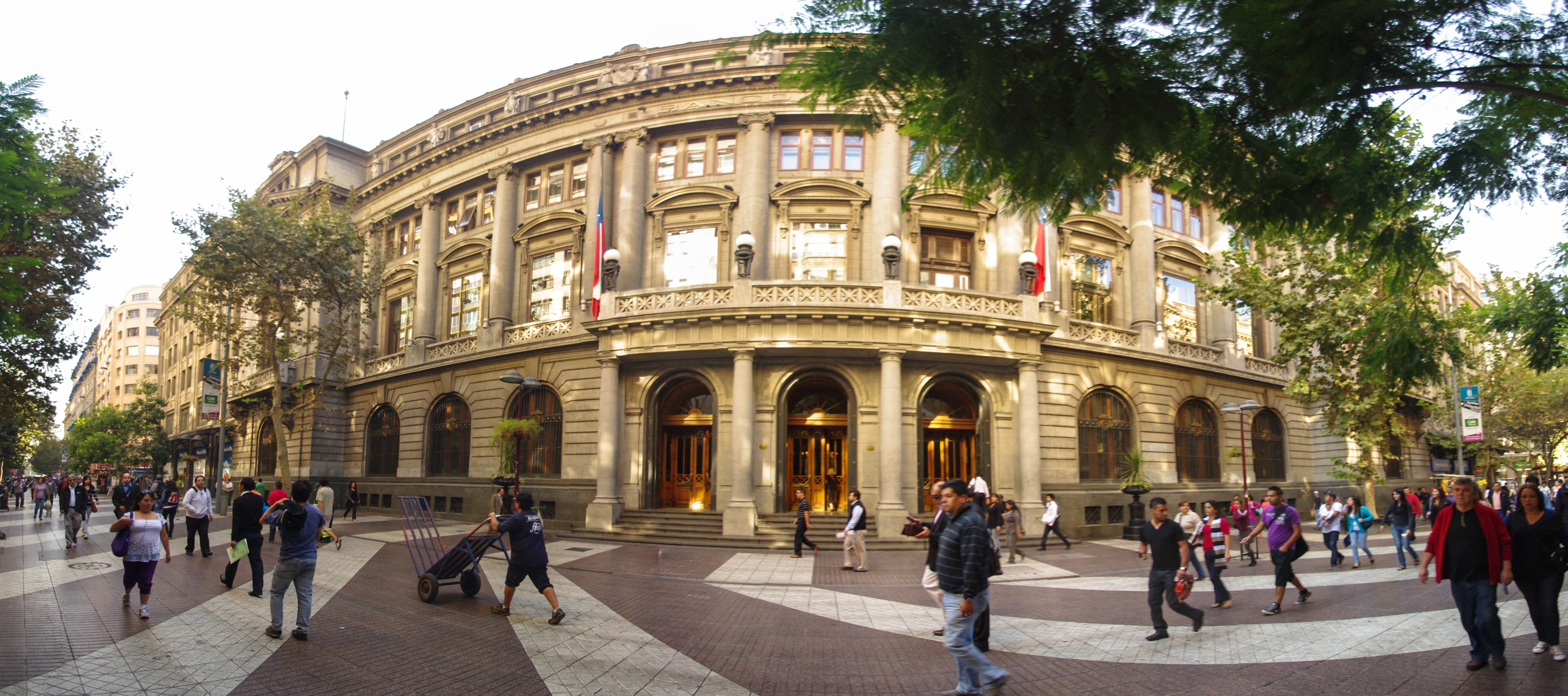
Head Office of the Bank of Chile

=== Heritage and monuments ===
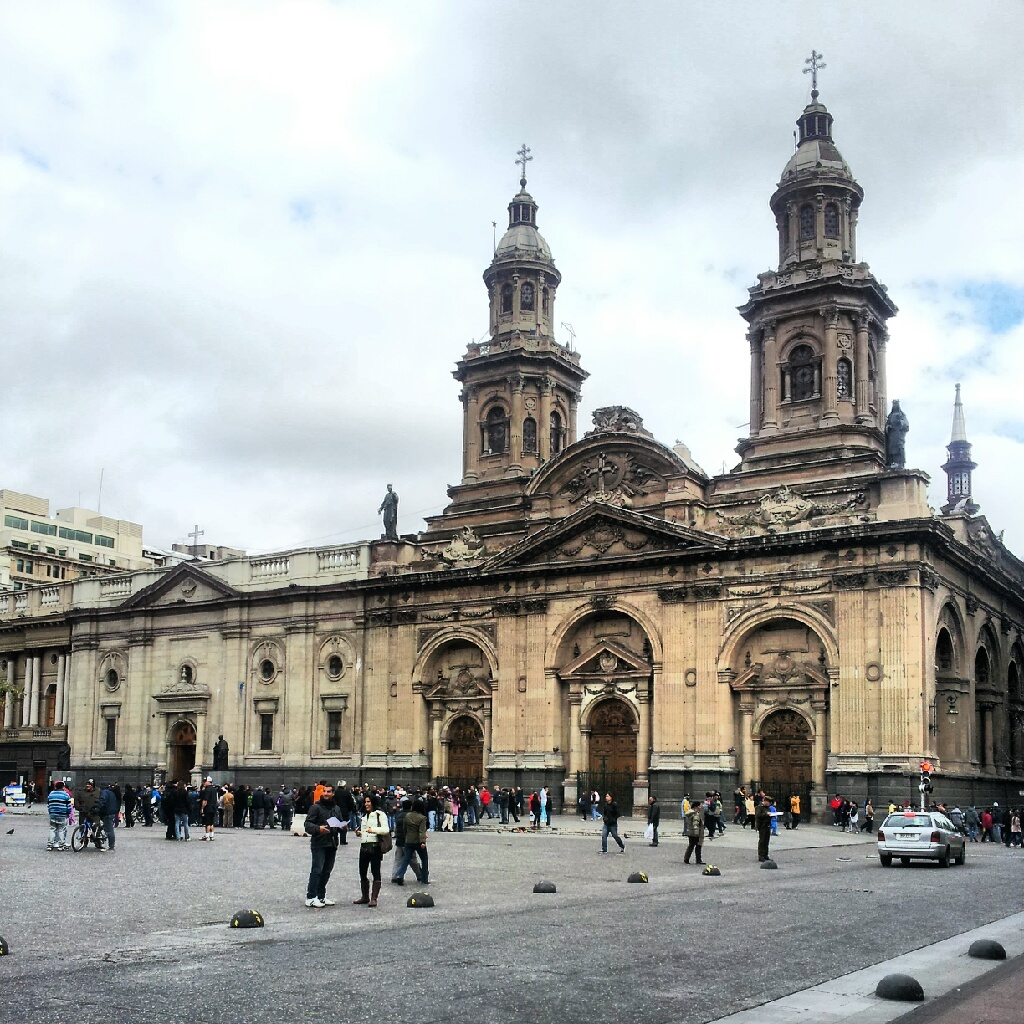
The Metropolitan Cathedral, built between 1748 and 1906

Within the metropolitan area of Santiago, there are 174 heritage sites in the custody of the National Monuments Council, among which are archeological, architectural and historical monuments, neighborhoods and typical areas. Of these, 93 are located within the commune of Santiago, considered the historic center of the city. Although no national heritage site in Santiago has been declared a World Heritage Site by Unesco, three have been proposed by the Chilean government: the Incan sanctuary of El Plomo, the church and convent of San Francisco and the palace of La Moneda.

In the center of Santiago are several buildings built during the Spanish domination and that mostly correspond to, as the Metropolitan Cathedral and the aforementioned church of San Francisco Catholic churches. Buildings of the period are those located on the sides of Plaza de Armas, as the seat of Real Audiencia, the Post Office or the Casa Colorada.

During the nineteenth century and the advent of independence, new architectural works began to be erected in the capital of the young republic. The aristocracy built small palaces for residential use, mainly around the neighborhood Republica and preserved until today. To this other structures adopted artistic trends from Europe, as the Equestrian Club of Santiago, the head offices of the University of Chile and the Catholic University, Central Station and the Mapocho Station, Mercado Central, join the National Library, Museum of Fine Arts and the Barrio París-Londres, among others.

Various green areas in the city contain within and around various sites of heritage character. Among the most important are the fortifications of Santa Lucia hill, the shrine of the Virgin Mary on the summit of San Cristobal hill, the lavish crypt of the General Cemetery, Parque Forestal, the O'Higgins Park and the Quinta Normal Park.

=== Cultural activities and entertainment ===
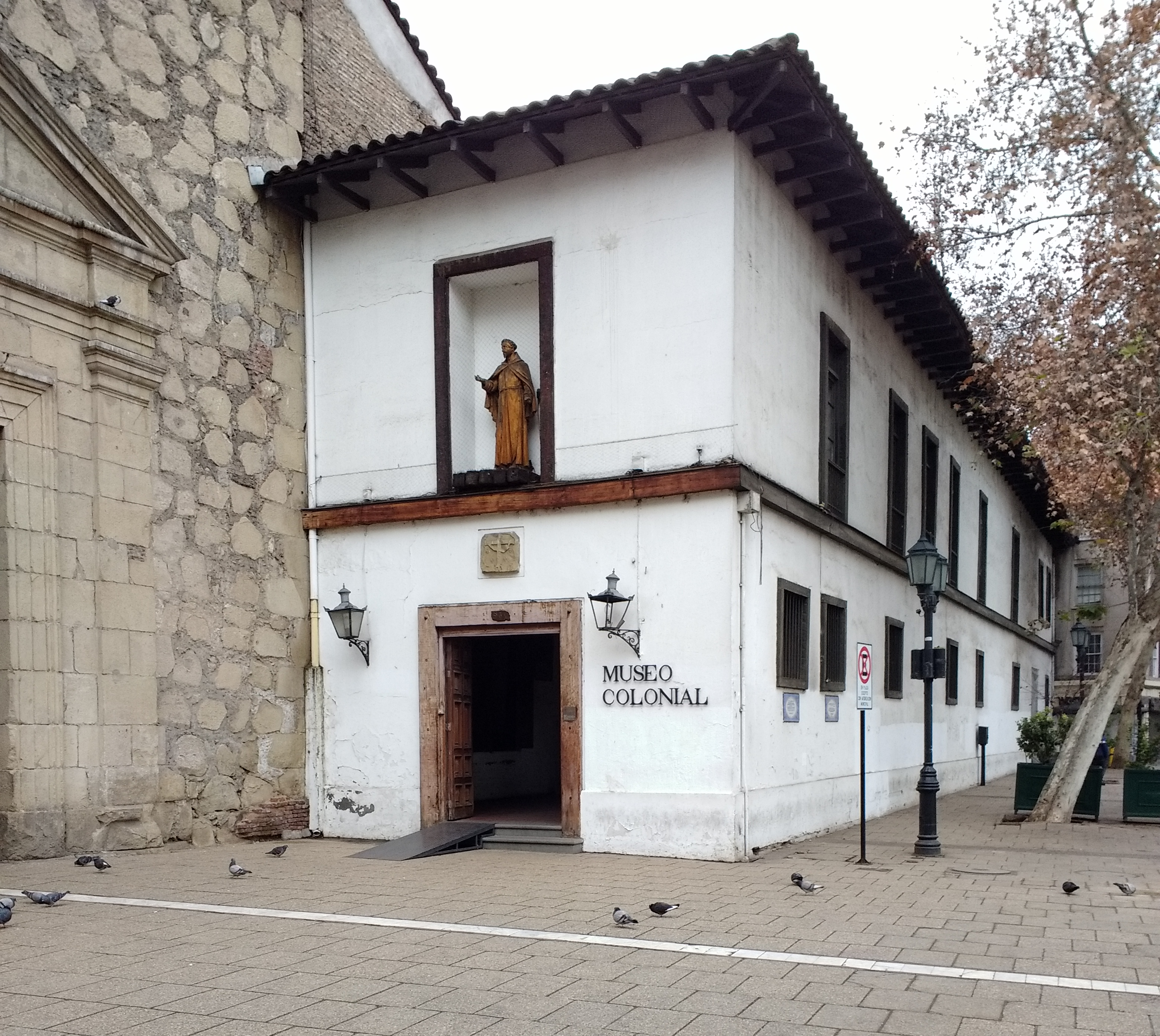
Museo de Arte Colonial de San Francisco.

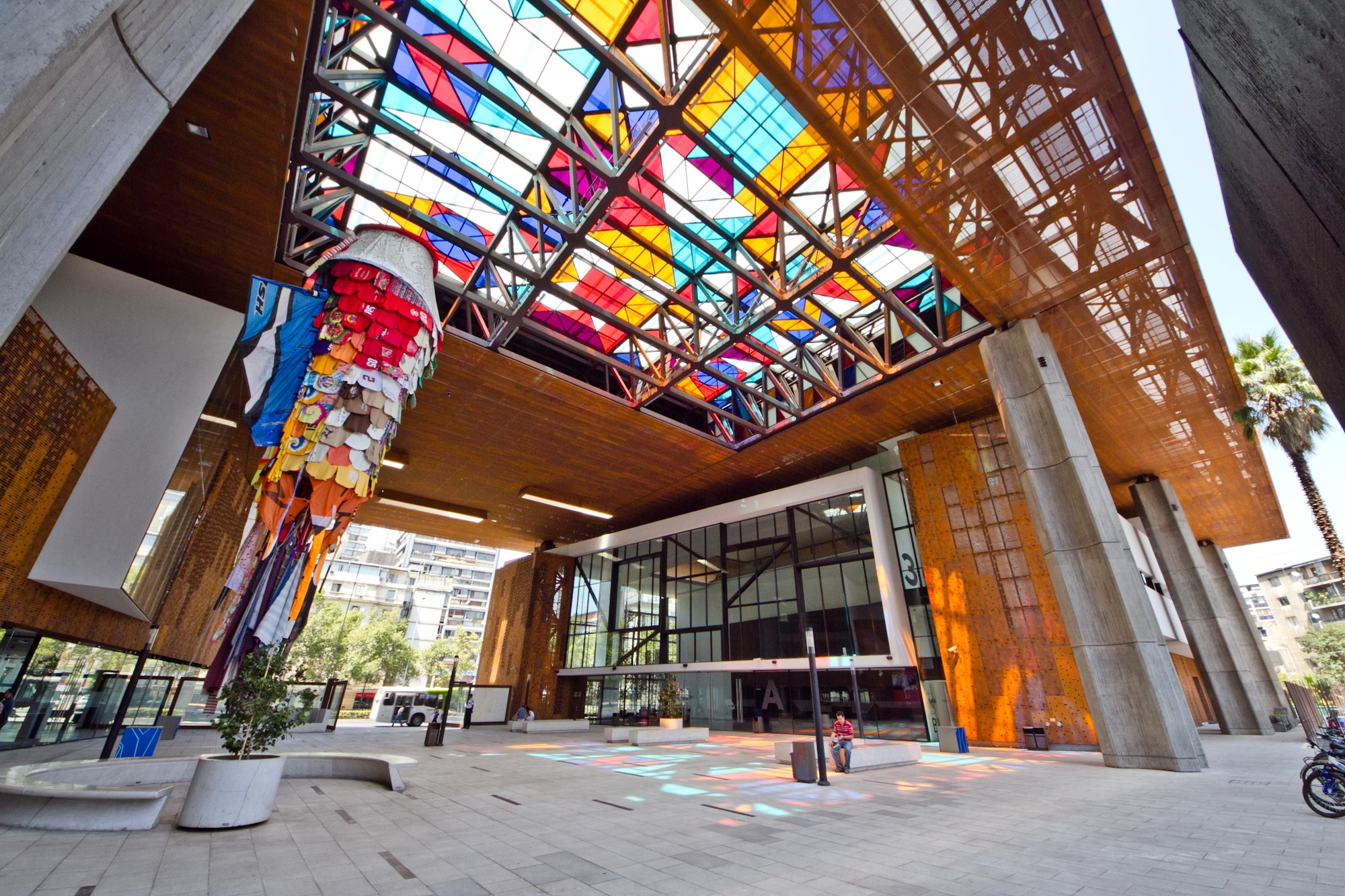
Gabriela Mistral Cultural Center.

In Santiago's major theater companies are located, hosting several national and international projects, with the highest expression during the International Theater Festival known as Santiago a Mil, which takes place every January since 1994 and has gathered more than one million spectators. Also is the Planetarium at the University of Santiago de Chile.

To carry out various cultural, artistic and musical events, there are several precincts within which highlight the Mapocho Cultural Center, 100 Matucana Cultural Center, the Gabriela Mistral Cultural Center, Centro Cultural Palacio de La Moneda, the Movistar Arena and the Caupolican Theater. On the other hand, the opera and ballet performances are permanently accepted by the Municipal Theater of Santiago, located in the heart of the city and which has a capacity of 1500 spectators.

There are 18 cinemas in the capital with a total of 144 rooms and over 32,000 seats, the projection centers than 5 arthouse add.

For children and teenagers, there are several entertainment venues, such as amusement park Fantasilandia, the National Zoo or the Buin Zoo on the outskirts of the city. The Bellavista, Brasil, Manuel Montt, Plaza Ñuñoa and Suecia account for most of the nightclubs, restaurants and bars in the city, the main evening entertainment centers in the capital. In order to promote the economic development of other regions, the law prohibits the construction of a casino in the metropolitan region, but nearby are the casino from the coastal city of Vina del Mar, 120 km from distance from Santiago, and Monticello Grand Casino in Mostazal, 56 kilometers south of Santiago, which opened in 2008.

=== Museums and libraries ===
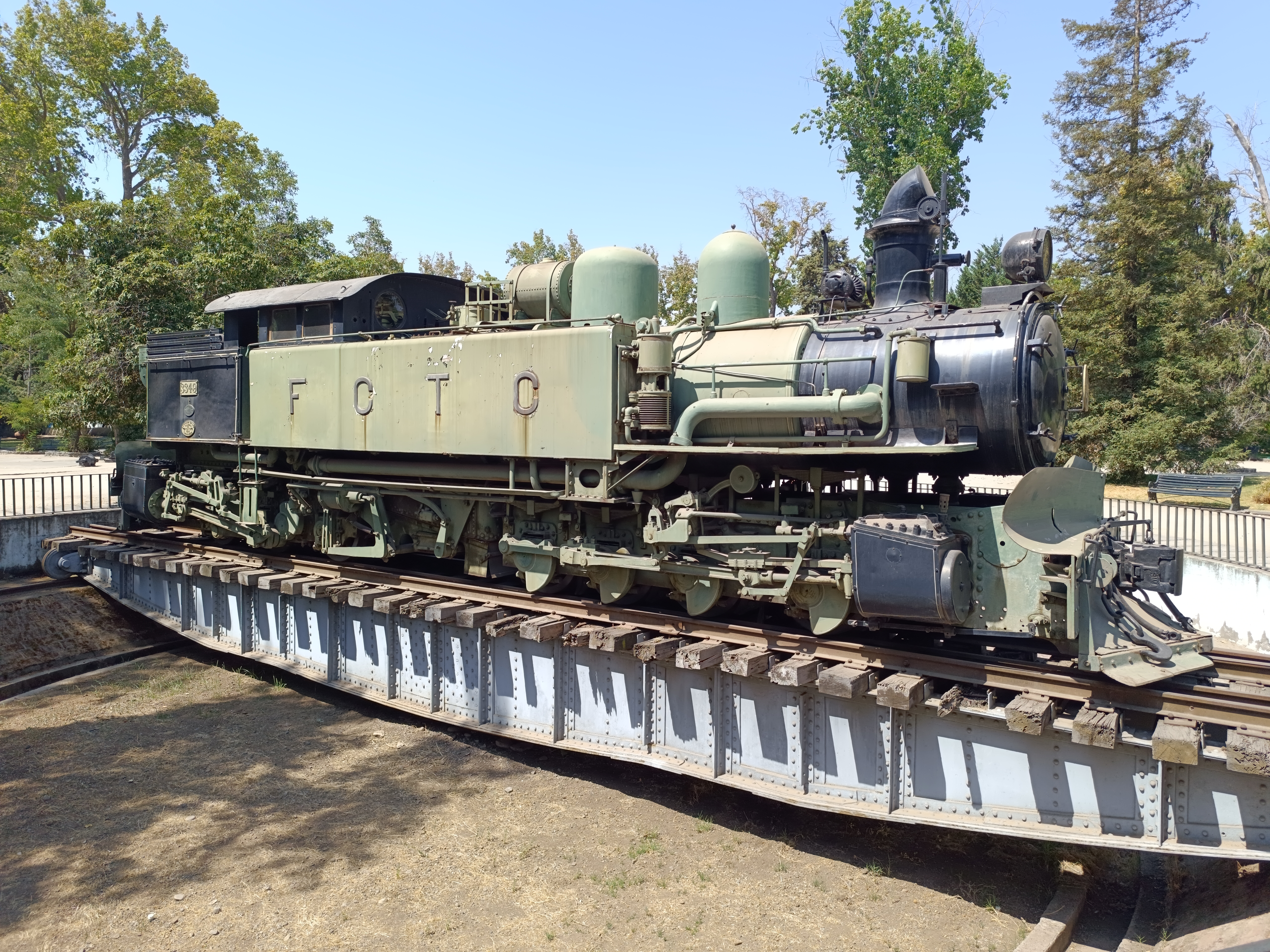
Kitson-Meyer 3349, year 1909, preserved in the Santiago Railway Museum.

Santiago has a wealth of museums of different kinds, among which are three of 'National' class administered by the Directorate of Libraries, Archives and Museums (DIBAM): the National History Museum, National Museum of Fine Arts and the National Museum of Natural History.

Most of the museums are located in the historic city center, occupying the old buildings of colonial origin, such as with the National History Museum, which is located in the Palacio de la Real Audiencia. La Casa Colorada houses the Museum of Santiago, while the Colonial Museum is housed in a wing of the Church of San Francisco and the Museum of Pre-Columbian Art occupies part of the old Palacio de la Aduana. The Museum of Fine Arts, though it is located in the city center, was built in the early twentieth century, especially for housing the museum and in the back of the building was laid in 1947, the Museum of Contemporary Art, under the Faculty of Arts of the University of Chile.

Quinta Normal Park also has several museums, among which are the already mentioned Natural History, Artequin Museum, the Museum of Science and Technology, and the Santiago Railway Museum. In 2010, the Museum of Memory and Human Rights was inaugurated, which commemorates the victims of human rights violations committed during the country's military dictatorship.

In other parts of the city there are some museums such as the Aeronautical Museum in Cerrillos, Museum of Tajamares in Providence and the Museo Interactivo Mirador in La Granja. The latter opened in 2000 and designed mainly for children and youth has been visited by more than 2.8 million visitors, making it the busiest museum in the country.

The most important public library is the National Library located in downtown Santiago. Its origins date back to 1813, when it was created by the nascent Republic and was moved to its current premises a century later, also home to the headquarters of the National Archives. In order to provide more closeness to the population, incorporating new technologies and complement the services provided by public libraries and the National Library was opened in 2005 the Library of Santiago at Barrio Matucana.

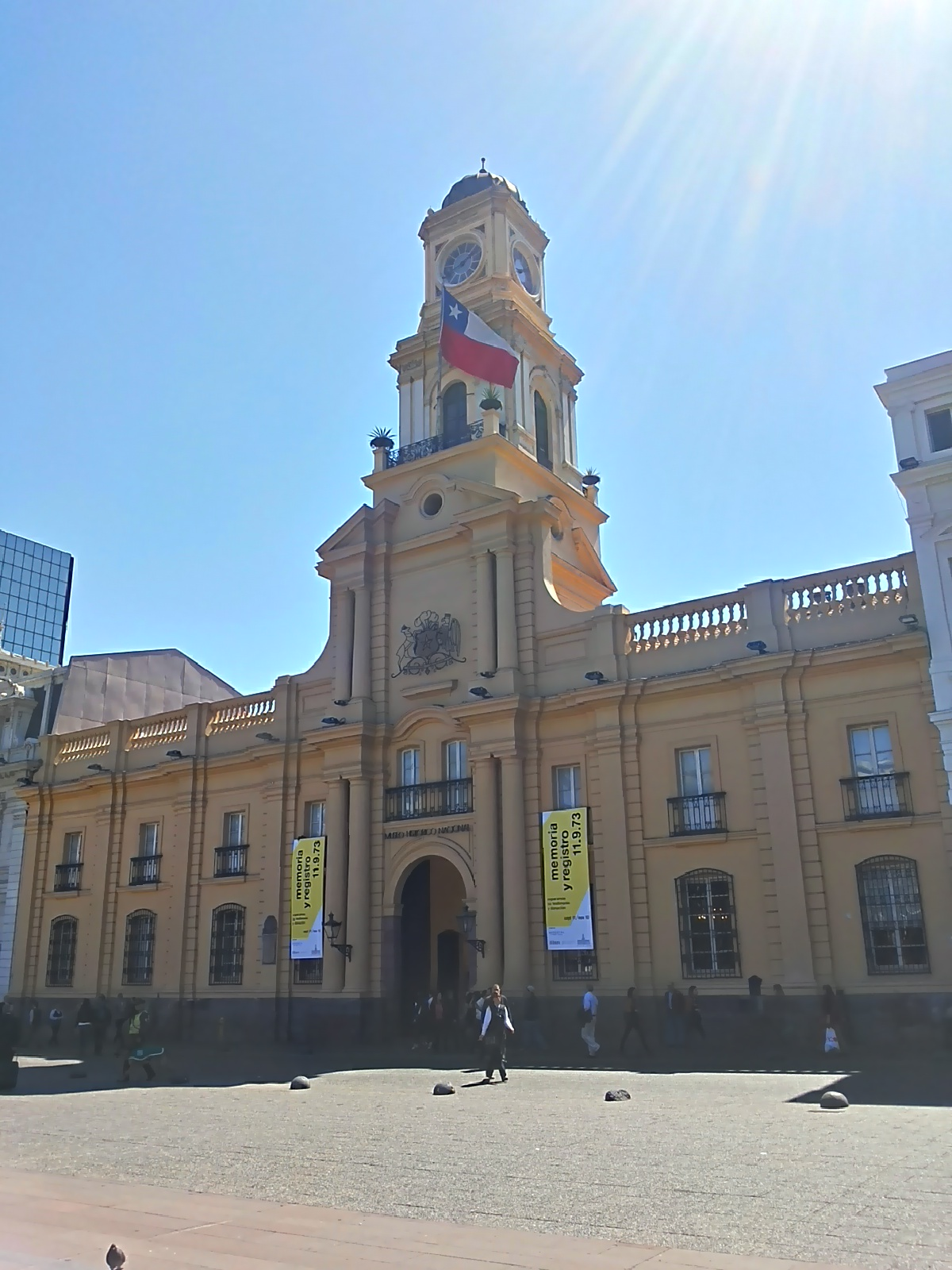
The National Historical Museum, located in the Plaza de Armas

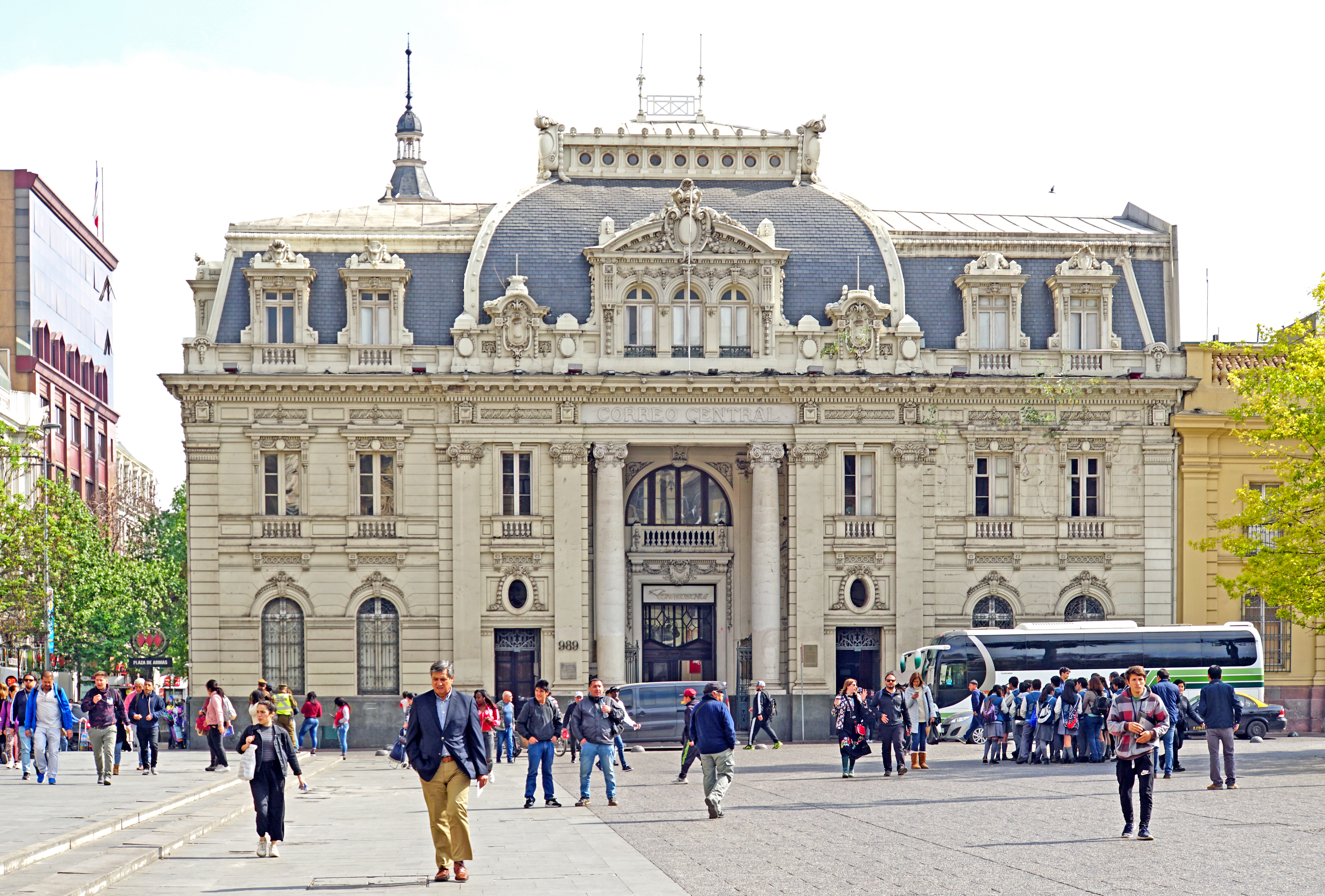
The Central Post Office Building

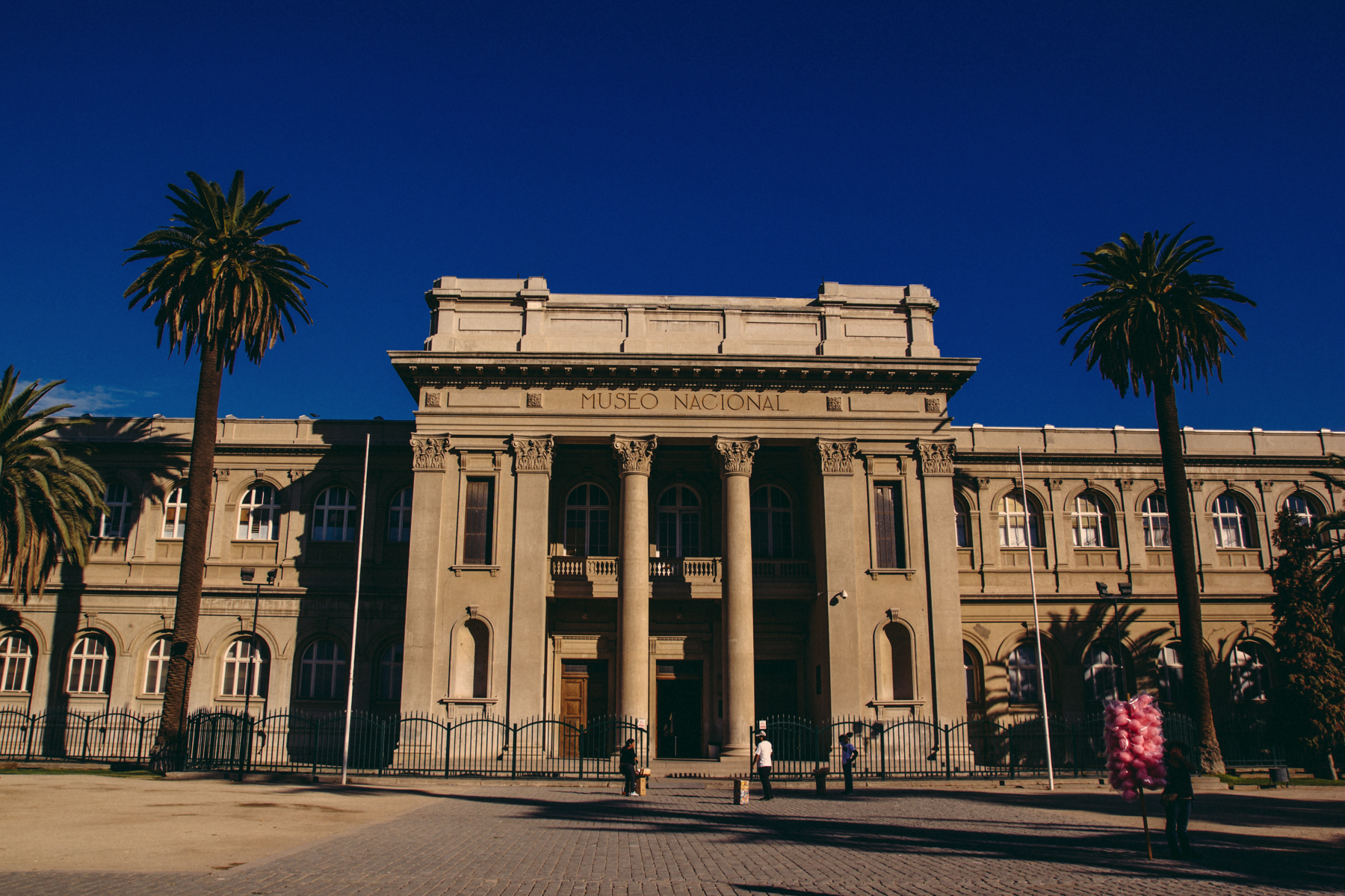
The National Museum of Natural History, located in the Quinta Normal.

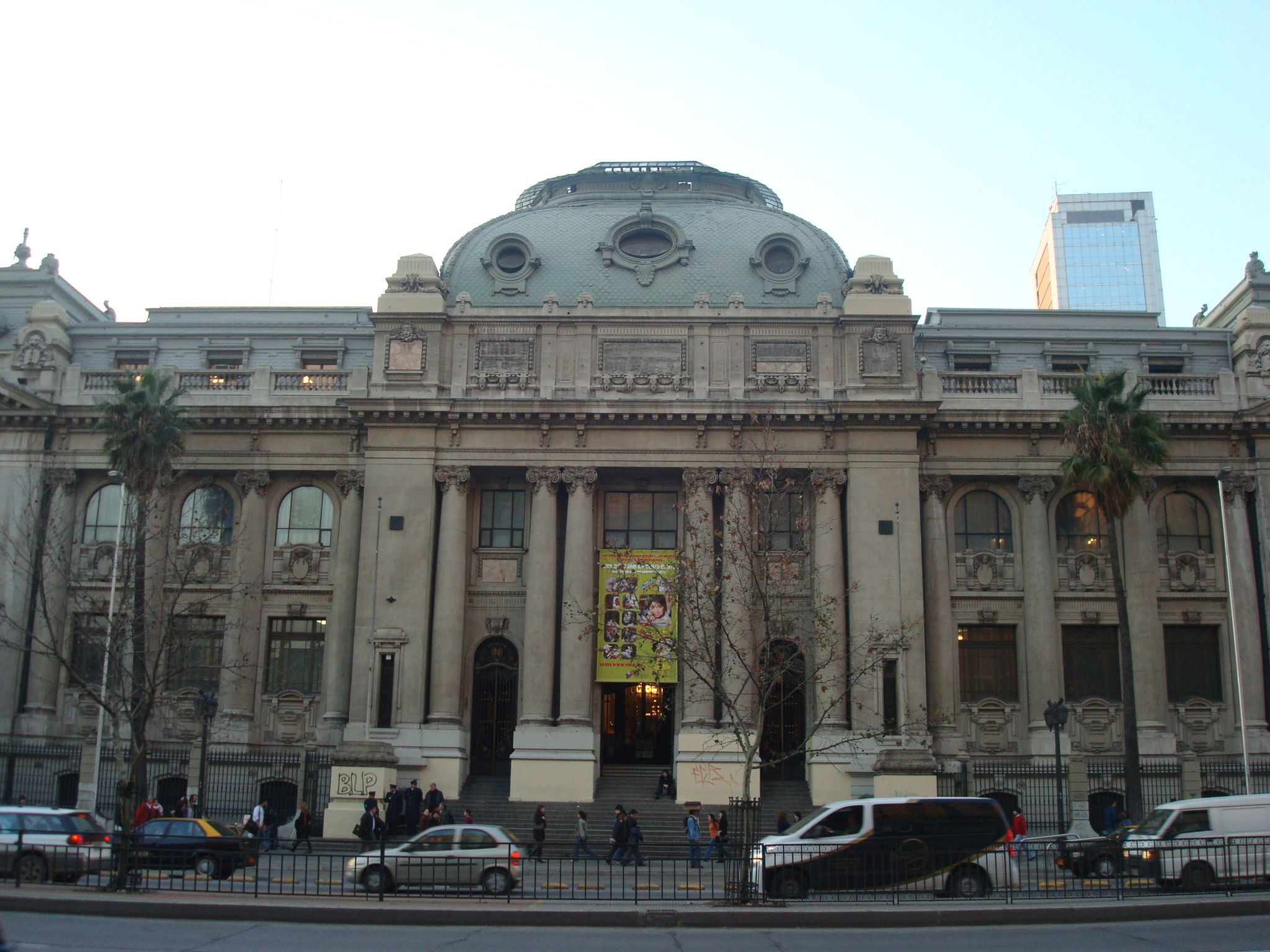
The National Library from La Alameda.

=== Music ===
Santiago has two symphony orchestras:

- Orquesta Filarmónica de Santiago ("Santiago Philharmonic Orchestra"), which performs in the Teatro Municipal (Municipal Theater of Santiago)
- Orquesta Sinfónica de Chile ("Chile Symphony Orchestra"), part of the Universidad de Chile, performs in its theater.

There are a number of jazz establishments, some of them, including "El Perseguidor", "Thelonious", and "Le Fournil Jazz Club", are located in Bellavista, one of Santiago's "hippest" neighborhoods, though "Club de Jazz de Santiago", the oldest and most traditional one, is in Ñuñoa. Annual festivals featured in Santiago include Lollapalooza and the Maquinaria festival.

=== Newspapers ===
The most widely circulated newspapers in Chile are published by El Mercurio and Copesa and have earned more than the 91% of revenues generated in printed advertising in Chile.

Some newspapers available in Santiago are:

- The Santiago Times
- La Segunda
- La Tercera
- La Cuarta
- El Mercurio
- The Clinic
- Las Últimas Noticias

=== Media ===
Santiago is home to the major Chilean television networks including the public broadcaster TVN and the privately held Canal 13, Chilevisión, La Red and Mega. In addition, the radio stations ADN Radio Chile, Radio Agricultura, Radio Concierto, Radio Cooperativa, Radio Pudahuel and Radio Rock & Pop are located in the city.

=== Sports ===
Santiago is home to some of Chile's most successful soccer clubs. Colo-Colo, founded on 19 April 1925, has a long tradition, and has played continuously in the highest league since the establishment of the first Chilean league in 1933. The club's wins include 30 national titles, 10 Copa Chile successes, and champions of the Copa Libertadores tournament in 1991, the only Chilean team to have won this tournament. The club hosts its home games in the Estadio Monumental in the commune of Macul.

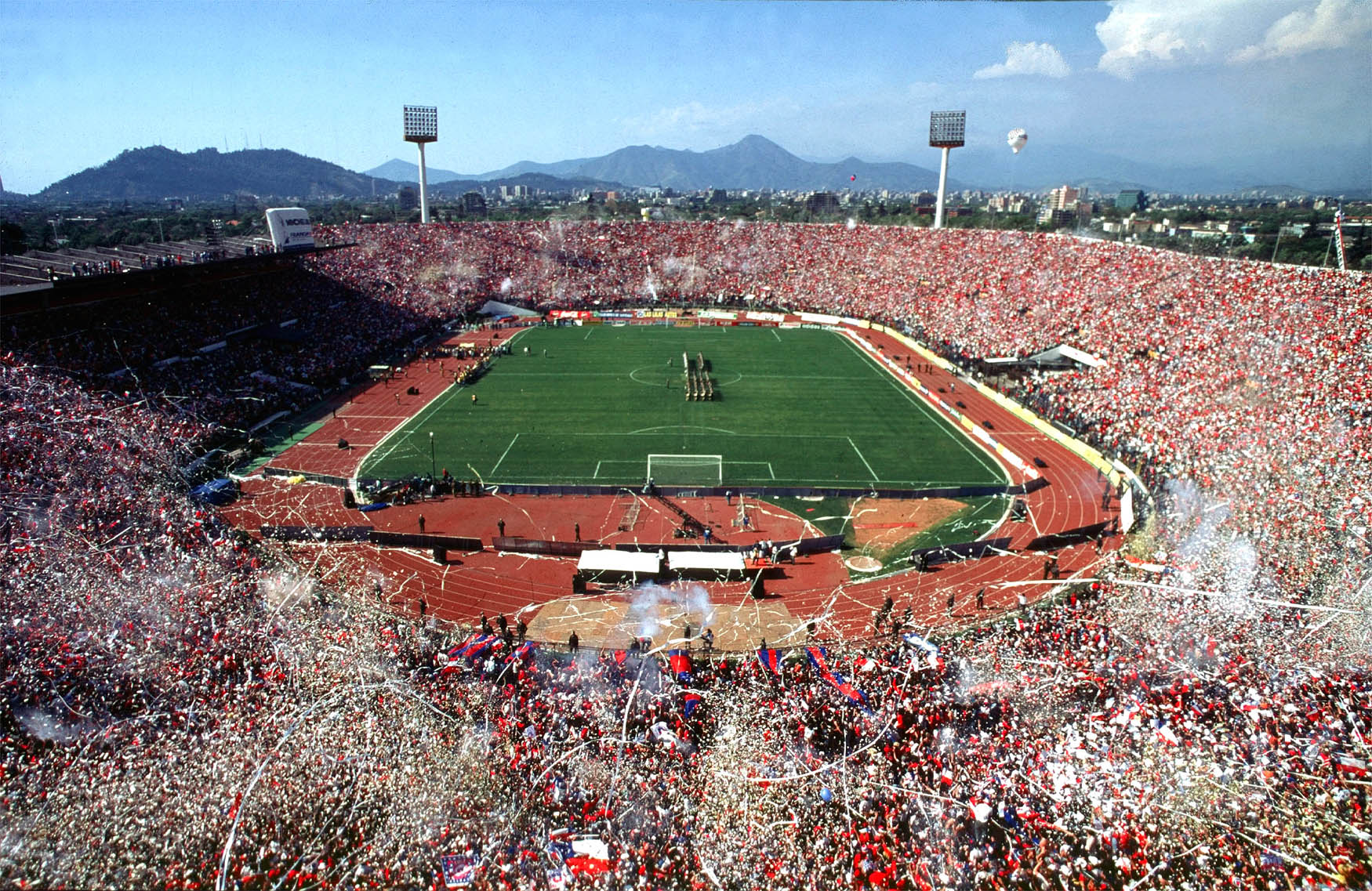
Estadio Nacional de Chile

Universidad de Chile has 18 national titles and 5 Copa Chile wins. In 2011 they were champions of Copa Sudamericana, the only Chilean team to have won this tournament. The club was founded on 24 May 1927, under the name Club Deportivo Universitario as a union of Club Náutico and Federación Universitaria. The founders were students of the University of Chile. In 1980, the organization separated from the University of Chile and the club is now completely independent. The team plays its home games in the Estadio Nacional de Chile in the commune of Ñuñoa.

Club Deportivo Universidad Católica (UC) was founded on 21 April 1937. It consists of fourteen different departments. This team plays its home games in Estadio San Carlos de Apoquindo. Universidad Católica has 16 national titles and 4 Copa Chile wins, making it the third most successful soccer club in the country. It has played the Copa Libertadores more than 20 times, reaching the final in 1993, losing to São Paulo FC.

Several other soccer clubs are based in Santiago, including Unión Española, Audax Italiano, Palestino, Santiago Morning, Magallanes and Barnechea. Other sports, mainly tennis and basketball, are also popular. The Club Hípico de Santiago and the Hipódromo Chile are the two horseracing tracks in the city.

Santiago hosted the final stages of the official 1959 Basketball World Cup, where Chile won the bronze medal.

The city held a round of the all-electric FIA Formula E Championship on 3 February 2018, on a temporary street circuit incorporating the Plaza Baquedano and Parque Forestal. It was the first FIA sanctioned race in the country.

The 2023 Pan American Games were held in Santiago.

The 2027 Special Olympics World Summer Games will be held in Santiago. This will mark the first time that a Spanish speaking country, the southern hemisphere and Latin America has ever hosted the Special Olympics World Games.

=== Recreation ===
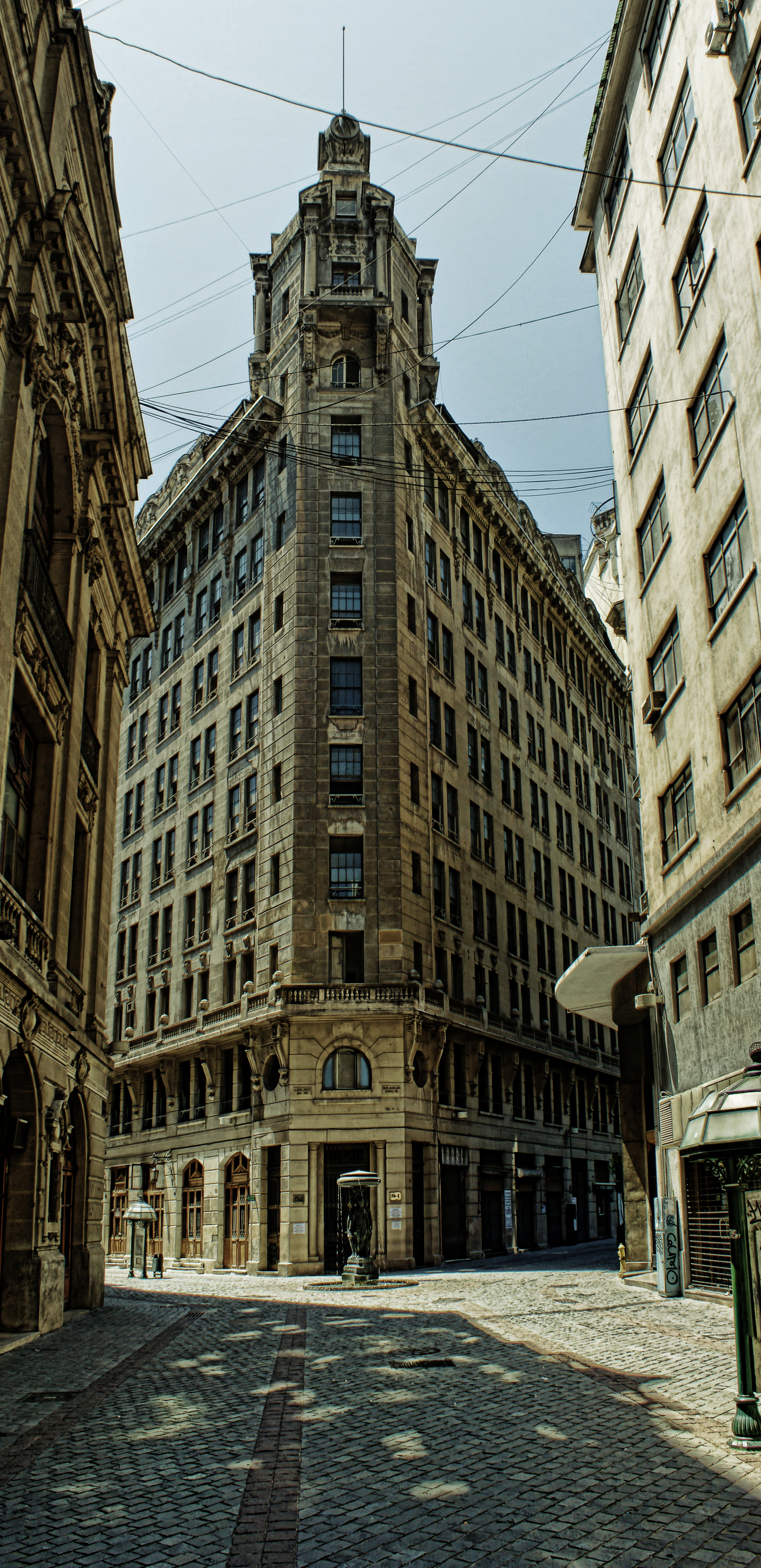
Edificio Ariztía in the center of the Barrio de La Bolsa.

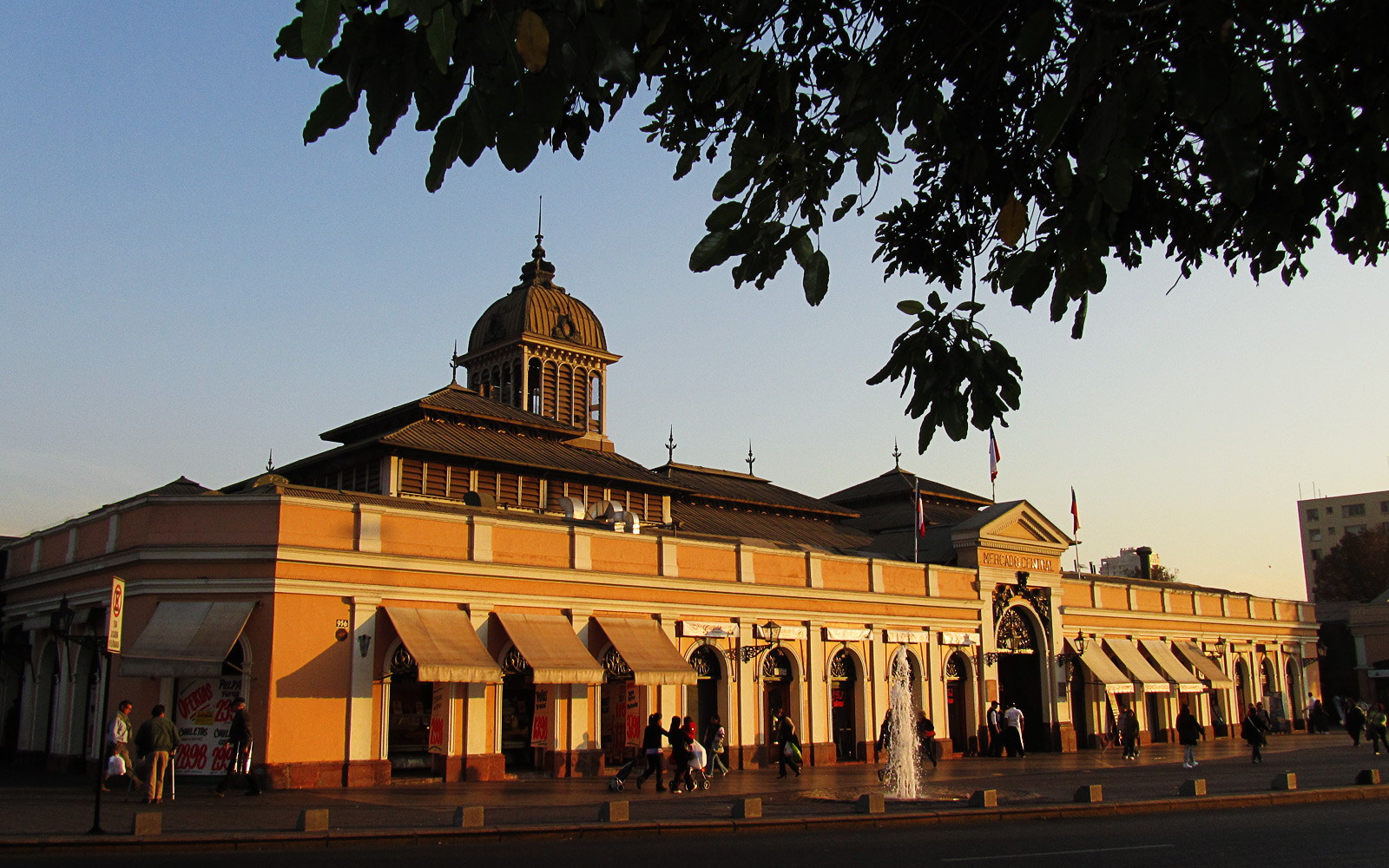
Central Market of Santiago

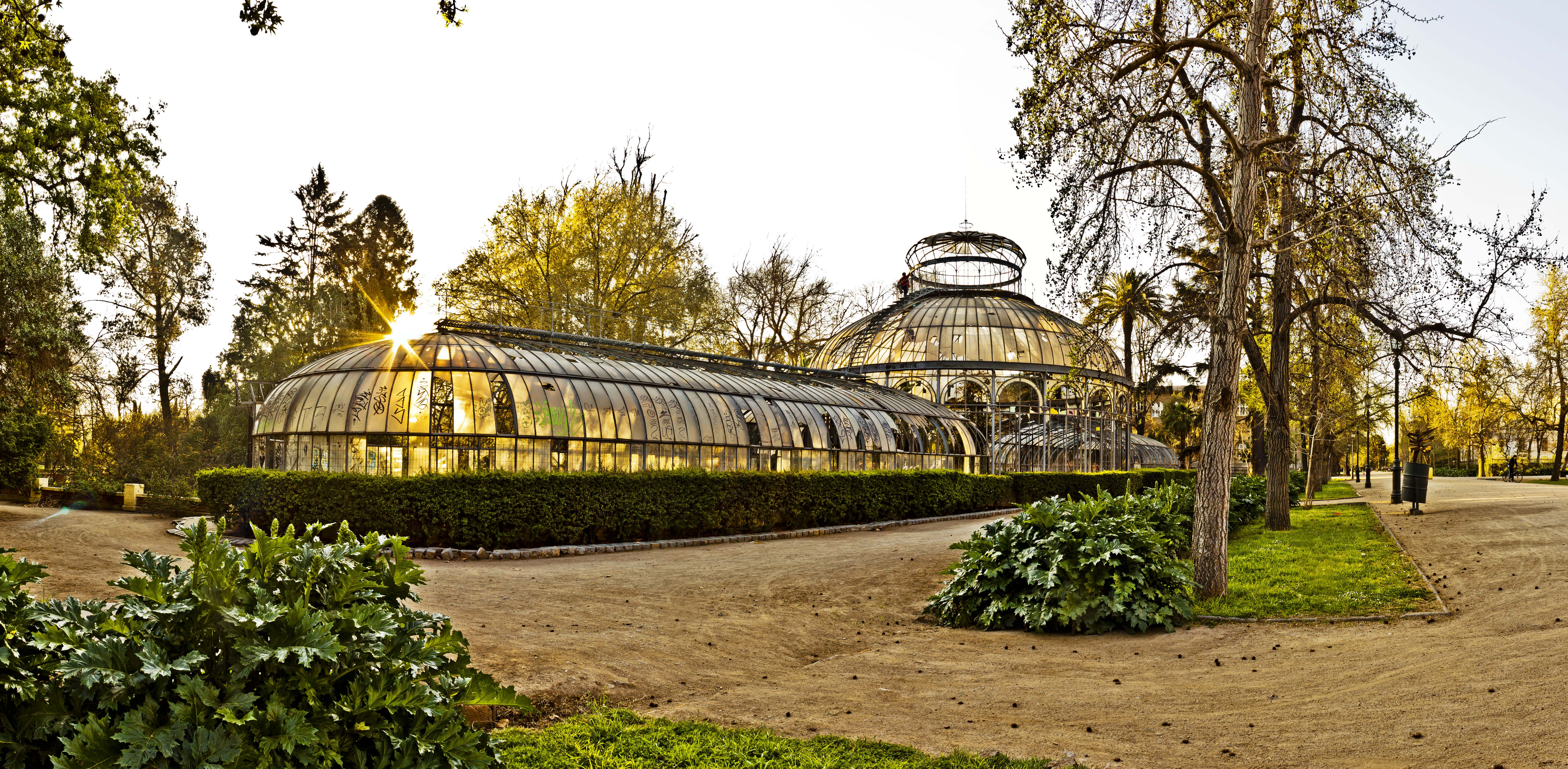
Quinta Normal Park Greenhouse

There is an extensive network of bicycle trails in the city, especially in the Providencia commune. The longest section is the Americo Vespuccio road, which contains a very wide dirt path with many trees through the center of a street used by motorists on both sides. The next longest path is along the Mapocho River along Andrés Bello Avenue. Many people use folding bicycles to commute to work.

The city's main parks are:

- 150-hectare Santiago Metropolitan Park, which covers the San Cristóbal Hill and includes the Chilean National Zoo and the Santiago Cable Car.
- Bicentennial Park, a 30-hectare park alongside the Mapocho river in Vitacura
- O'Higgins Park
- Quinta Normal Park
- Forestal Park, park located at the city center alongside Mapocho river
- Santa Lucia Hill
- Parque Araucano in Las Condes, adjacent to the Parque Arauco shopping mall contains 30 hectares of gardens.
- Parque Inés de Suarez in Providencia
- Parque Padre Hurtado, also known as Parque Intercomunal.
- Parque de la Familia
- Parque Mapocho Río

There are ski resorts to the east of the city (Valle Nevado, La Parva, El Colorado) and wineries in the plains west of the city.

Cultural venues include:

- Museo de Bellas Artes – Fine Arts Museum
- Museo Violeta Parra, an art museum dedicated to Chilean folk artist Violeta Parra [opened in 2015 and damaged in 2020]
- Barrio Bellavista, cultural and bohemian neighborhood
- Central Station, railway station designed by Gustave Eiffel
- Víctor Jara Stadium
- Ex National Congress
- Plaza de Armas, central square
- Palacio de La Moneda, government palace.
- Teatro Municipal (Municipal Theater of Santiago), the principal opera house of the country.

The main sports venues are Estadio Nacional (site of the 1962 World Cup final), Estadio Monumental David Arellano, Estadio Santa Laura, and Estadio San Carlos de Apoquindo.

=== Religion ===
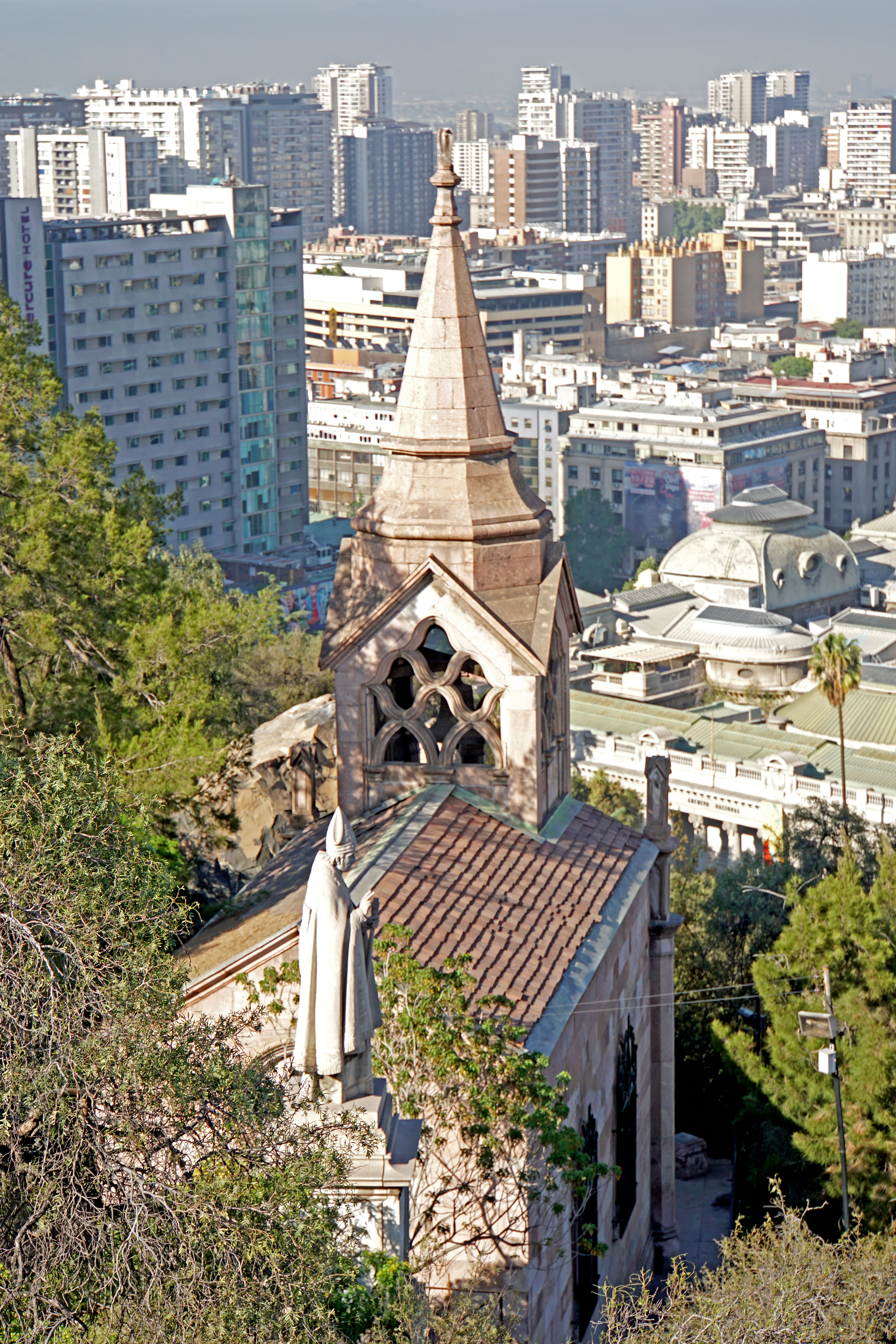
Hermitage of the Santa Lucía Hill

As in most of Chile, the majority of the population of Santiago is Catholic. According to the National Census, carried out in 2002 by the National Statistics Bureau (INE), in the Santiago Metropolitan Region, 3,129,249 people 15 and older identified themselves as Catholics, equivalent to 68.7% of the total population, while 595,173 (13.1%) described themselves as Evangelical Protestants. Around 1.2% of the population declared themselves as being Jehovah's Witnesses, while 2.0% identified themselves as Latter-day Saints (Mormons), 0.3% as Jewish, 0.1% as Eastern Orthodox and 0.1% as Muslim. Approximately 10.4% of the population of the Metropolitan Region stated that they were atheist or agnostic, while 5.4% declared that they followed other religions. In 2010 construction was initiated on the Santiago Bahá'í Temple, serving as the Baháʼí House of Worship for South America, in the commune of Peñalolen. Construction at the site was completed and the temple was dedicated in October 2016.

== Education ==
The city is home to numerous universities, colleges, research institutions, and libraries.

The largest university and one of the oldest in the Americas is Universidad de Chile. The roots of the university date back to the year 1622, as on 19 August the first university in Chile under the name of Santo Tomás de Aquino was founded. On 28 July 1738, it was named the Real Universidad de San Felipe in honor of King Philip V of Spain. In the vernacular, it is also known as Casa de Bello (Spanish: House of Bello – after their first Rector, Andrés Bello). On 17 April 1839, after Chile's independence from the Kingdom of Spain, it was renamed the Universidad de Chile, and reopened on 17 September 1843.

The Pontificia Universidad Católica de Chile (PUC) was founded in June 1888 and was ranked as the best school in Latin America in 2014. On 11 February 1930 it was declared a university by a decree of Pope Pius XI. It received recognition by the Chilean government as an appointed Pontifical University in 1931. Joaquín Larraín Gandarillas (1822–1897), Archbishop of Santiago, was the founder and first rector of the PUC. The PUC is a modern university; the campus of San Joaquin has a number of contemporary buildings and offers many parks and sports facilities. Several courses are conducted in English. Ex-president, Sebastián Piñera, minister Ricardo Raineri, and minister Hernán de Solminihac all attended PUC as students and worked in PUC as professors. In the 2010 admission process, approximately 48% of the students who achieved the best score in the Prueba de Selección Universitaria matriculated in the UC.

=== Higher education ===
==== Traditional ====
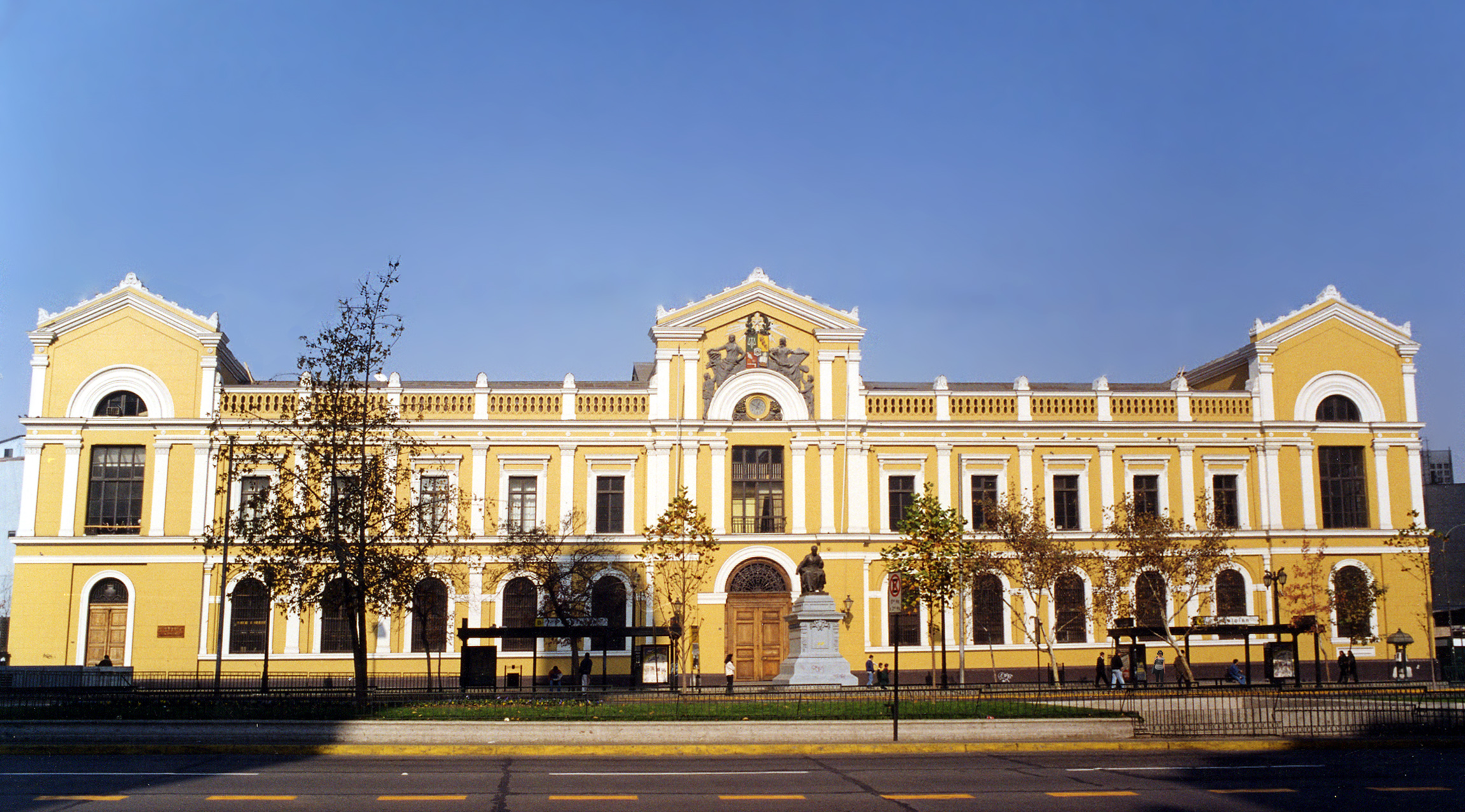
Universidad de Chile

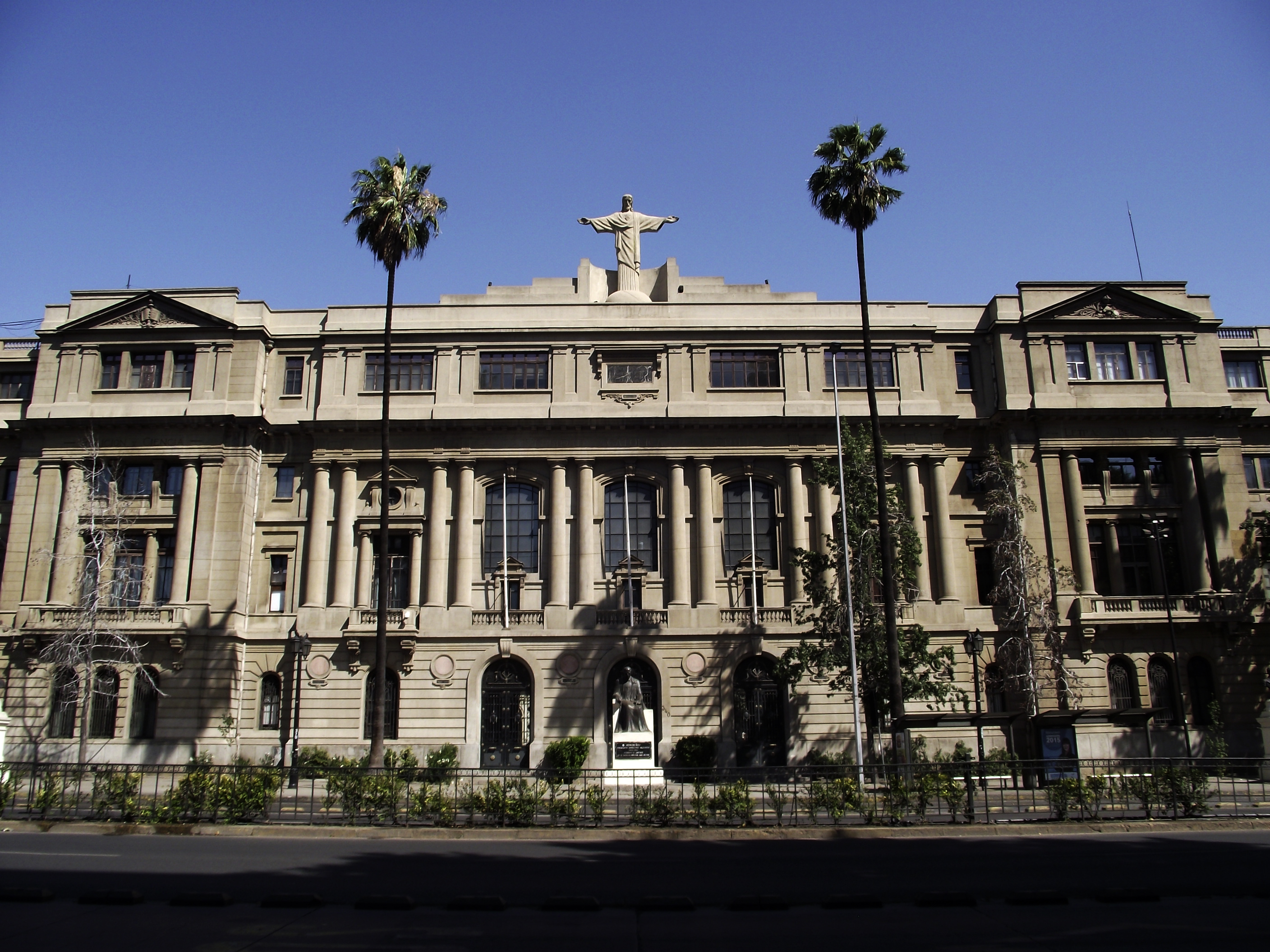
Pontificia Universidad Católica de Chile

- Universidad de Chile (U or UCH)
- Pontificia Universidad Católica de Chile (PUC)
- Universidad de Santiago de Chile (USACH)
- Universidad Metropolitana de Ciencias de la Educación (UMCE)
- Universidad Tecnológica Metropolitana (UTEM)
- Universidad Técnica Federico Santa María (UTFSM)

==== Non-traditional ====
- Universidad Adolfo Ibáñez (UAI)
- Universidad del Desarrollo (UDD)
- Universidad Diego Portales (UDP)
- Universidad Alberto Hurtado (UAH)
- Universidad Central de Chile (Ucen)
- Universidad Nacional Andrés Bello (Unab)
- Universidad Academia de Humanismo Cristiano (UAHC)
- Universidad Mayor (UM)
- Universidad Finis Terrae
- Universidad de Los Andes
- Universidad Gabriela Mistral (UGM)
- Universidad del Pacífico
- Universidad de las Américas
- Universidad de Artes, Ciencias y Comunicación (UNIACC)
- Universidad San Sebastián (USS)
- Universidad Bolivariana

==== Other ====
- Ruprecht Karls University of Heidelberg's Postgraduierten- und Weiterbildungszentrum der Universität Heidelberg in Santiago
- David Rockefeller Center for Latin American Studies (DRCLAS) Regional Office in Santiago
- Stanford Faculty in Santiago
- Diplomatic Academy of Chile

== International relations ==
Santiago is home to a number of international relations institutions, such as the Regional Unit for International Affairs (URAI) of the Metropolitan Regional Government of Santiago, responsible for analyzing and managing the Santiago Metropolitan Region’s bilateral and multilateral relations with Latin America and the rest of the world; the International Cooperation Commission of the Metropolitan Regional Council of Santiago; the Ministry of Foreign Affairs of Chile; the National Migration Service; the National Headquarters for Migration and International Police of the Investigations Police of Chile; the General Directorate for Export Promotion; the Chilean Agency for International Cooperation for Development; the International Relations Unit of the Municipality of Peñalolén; and municipal migration offices in 32 communes of the Santiago Metropolitan Area.

=== International organizations ===
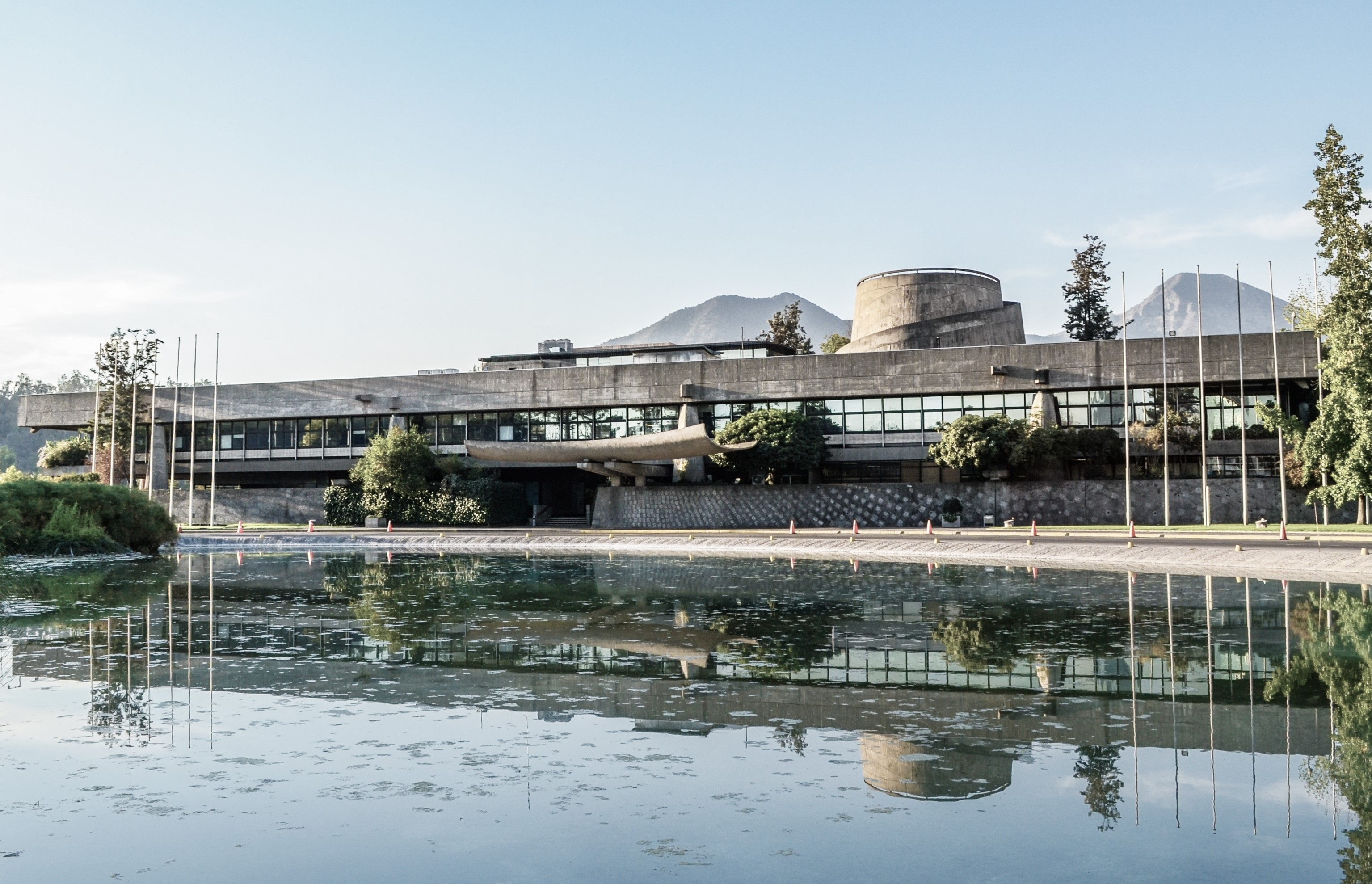
Economic Commission for Latin America and the Caribbean (ECLAC).

Santiago is home to the International District of Vitacura (IDV), also known as the United Nations (UN) Santiago Complex, which serves as the national and Latin American regional headquarters for more than 15 international organizations. These include the Economic Commission for Latin America and the Caribbean (ECLAC), the Pan American Health Organization (PAHO), the Food and Agriculture Organization Regional Office for Latin America and the Caribbean (FAO-RLC), the International Labour Organization (ILO), and the United Nations Development Programme (UNDP). In other sectors of the city are located the United Nations Educational, Scientific and Cultural Organization (UNESCO), the World Bank, the Inter-American Development Bank, and CAF - Development Bank of Latin America and the Caribbean.

=== Internationalization in higher education ===
In the field of international relations and higher education, the main actors in Santiago are the Office of the Vice President for International Affairs of the Pontifical Catholic University of Chile, the Office of International Relations of the University of Chile, the Department of International and Interuniversity Relations of the University of Santiago, Chile, the Office of International Relations of the Adolfo Ibáñez University, the Vice-Rector’s Office for International Affairs of the Andrés Bello University, the Directorate of Globalization of the University of Development, and the General Directorate of International Relations of the Diego Portales University. Santiago also hosts higher education and research institutions specializing in International Relations, such as the Institute of International Studies of the University of Chile, the Institute for Advanced Studies of the University of Santiago, Chile, the Diplomatic Academy of Chile “Andrés Bello” (ACADE), and the National Academy of Political and Strategic Studies (ANEPE).

=== Twin towns – sister cities ===
Santiago is twinned with:

- Beijing, China
- Buenos Aires, Argentina
- Guangzhou, China
- Kyiv, Ukraine
- London, England, United Kingdom
- Madrid, Spain
- Miami, United States
- Minneapolis, United States
- Riga, Latvia
- (Brazil) São Paulo, Brasil
- Tangier, Morocco

=== Cooperation and friendship ===
- Paris, France
- Tunis, Tunisia

=== Union of Ibero-American Capital Cities ===
Santiago is part of the Union of Ibero-American Capital Cities from 12 October 1982.

== See also ==
- List of people from Santiago
- Criollo people
- La Calera railway station
- Mosacat
