= Torre de la Industria =

Skyscraper in Santiago, Chile

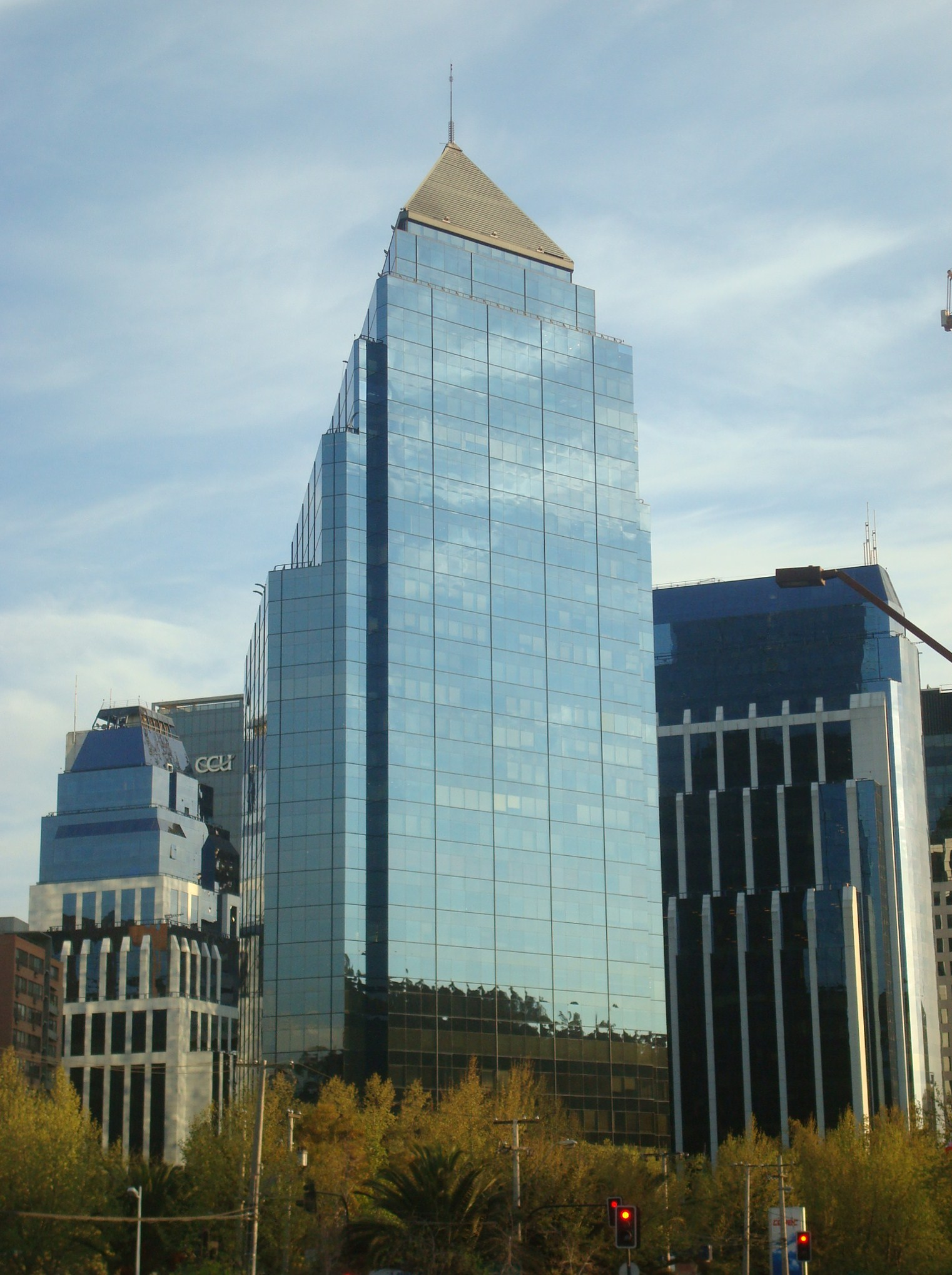
- Interactive map of the Torre de la Industria area

General information
- Status: Completed
- Type: Office
- Location: Santiago, Chile, 2777 Avenida Andrés Bello, Las Condes, Santiago Metropolitan Region, Chile
- Coordinates: 33.41474°S 70.60465°W
- Construction started: 1993
- Completed: 1994

Height
- Roof: 120 m (390 ft)

Technical details
- Structural system: Concrete
- Floor count: 33 (+3 underground)
- Floor area: 52,000 m^{2} (560,000 sq ft)

Design and construction
- Architects: Senerman, Cruz & Echeñique
- Structural engineer: Alfonso Larraín V.

Torre de la Industria (Spanish for Industry Tower) is a high-rise office building in the Las Condes district of Santiago, Chile. Built between 1993 and 1994, the tower stands at 120 m (390 ft) tall with 32 floors and is the current 8th tallest building in Chile.

== History ==
The building was designed by the Chilean architects Abraham Senerman Lamas, José Cruz Covarrubias and Juan Echenique Guzmán of the Sencorp SA firm. It is located in the area known as Sanhattan, in the eastern part of the city of Santiago de Chile. The tower has held the record of the tallest building in Chile between 1994 and 1996, when it was surpassed by the Torre Telefónica Chile (CTC Tower). The facades for all of the three towers dispose of a curtain wall glazing system with insulated glass panels.

=== Architecture ===
Inaugurated in 1992 for the Sociedad de Fomento Fabril (Sofofa), the building was the initial skyscraper in that part of Santiago and, after completion, became the highest structure in the city. Erected on the former CCU property, this tall building has a triangular shape with angled corners, housing a sturdy core in the middle that holds two sets of four elevators and two stairways. The double-height entrance hall on the ground floor is surrounded by two premises with separate access from the Costanera. The tower takes full advantage of the site's potential for occupancy by reaching all the way to the ground, and the metal pyramid on top of the complex houses the necessary technical components for the building's functionality.

== See also ==
- List of tallest buildings in Chile
- List of tallest buildings in South America

Records
| Preceded by Torre Santa María | Tallest building in Chile; 1994–1996 | Succeeded by Torre Telefónica Chile |
