= Manhattanization =

Construction of many tall or densely situated buildings

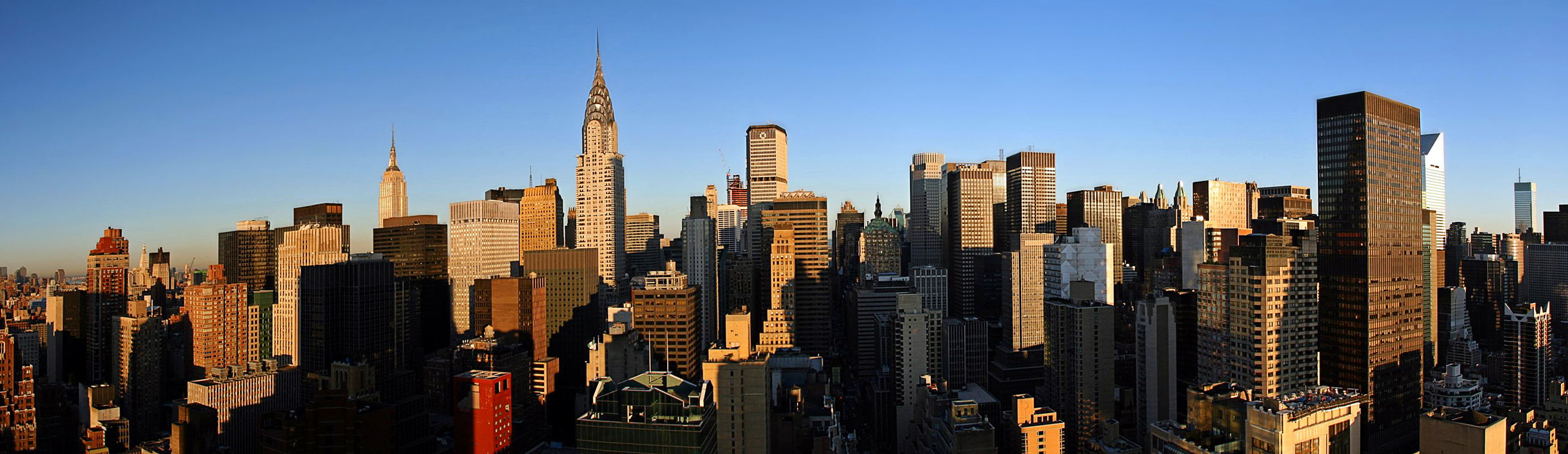
The island of Manhattan in New York City, United States, from which the term is derived

Manhattanization is a neologism coined to describe the construction of many tall or densely situated buildings, which transforms the appearance and character of a city to what is similar to Manhattan, the most densely populated borough of New York City. It was a pejorative word used by critics of the highrise buildings built in San Francisco during the 1960s and 1970s, who claimed the skyscrapers would block views of the bay and the surrounding hills. With careful urban planning, the phenomenon became more accepted in time. The term also gained usage as a buzzword for high-density developments in Las Vegas, Los Angeles, Dubai, and Miami in the early 2000s and again in the 2010s. Another example is the high rise development in Toronto since 2007, as well as rapid development of skyscrapers in Hong Kong and Tokyo since the 1970s, eventually allowing Hong Kong to possess more skyscrapers than New York. The term has even been applied to many smaller US cities that have seen a large spike in downtown high rise rental buildings since the 21st century.

== Frankfurt ==
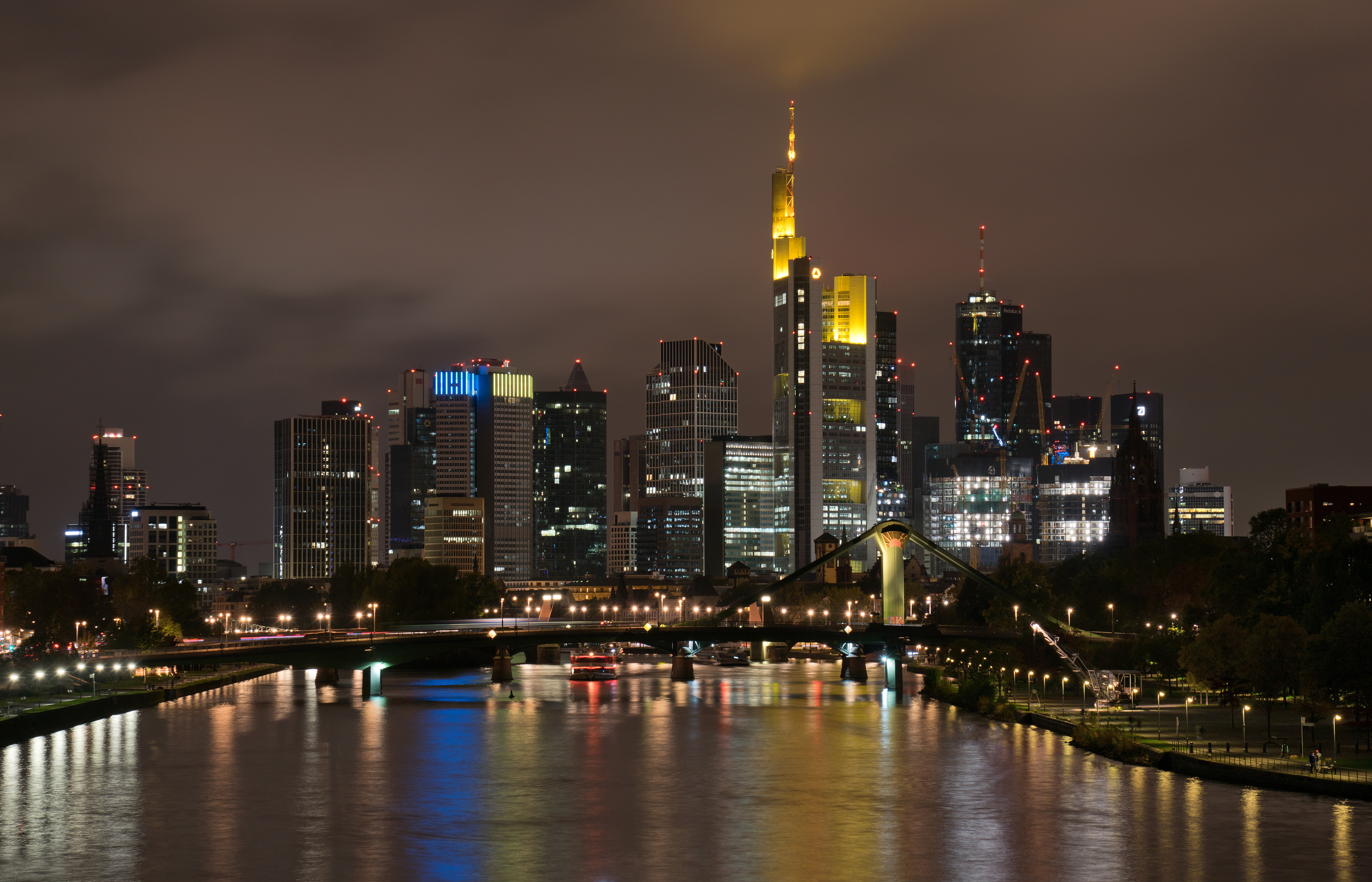
Skyline of Frankfurt, known as "Mainhattan"

"Mainhattan" is a term referring to Frankfurt's skyline, especially that of its central business district, the Bankenviertel. The word is a portmanteau of Main, the river on which Frankfurt lies, and Manhattan, a reference to the inner city area's visually impressive high rises and skyscrapers, a special feature for a European city.

The first tall buildings were built in the 1960s. Originally, the expression was sometimes used derisively, but the connotation has changed to a positive one.

== Miami ==
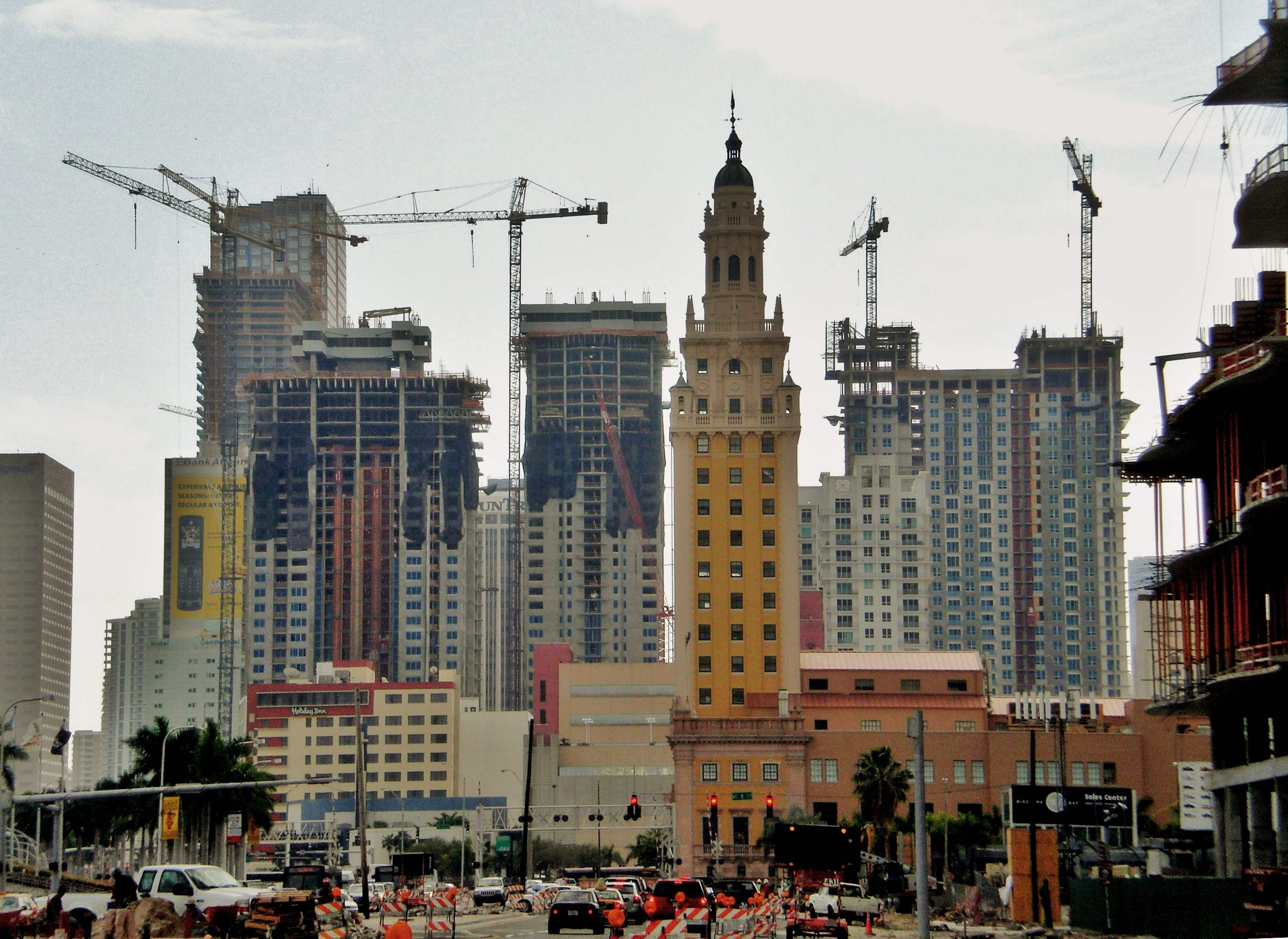
Extensive "Manhattanization" was experienced during the 2000s in Miami. Pictured here is the Miami skyline behind the Freedom Tower in 2005.

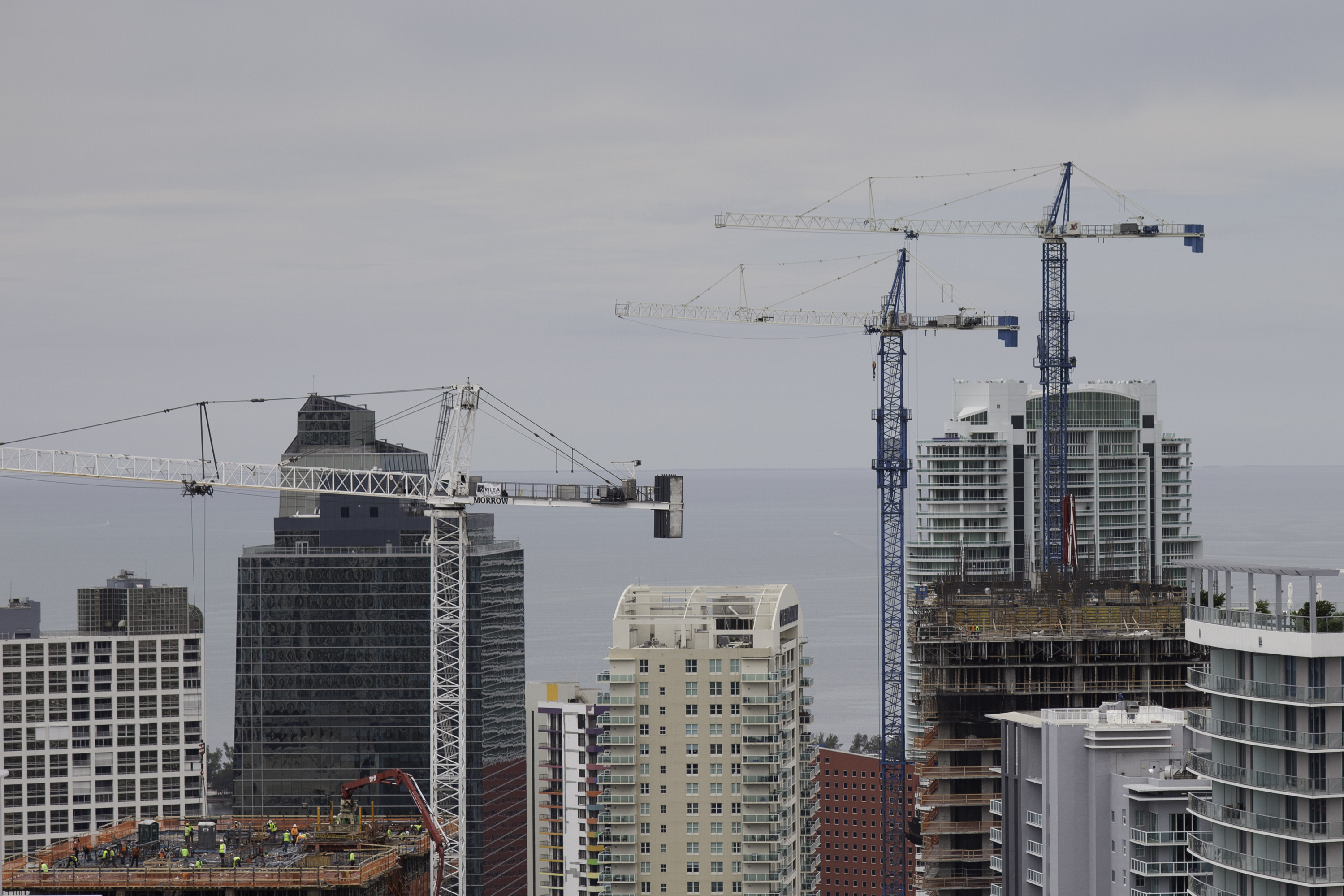
High rise construction in a small portion of the Brickell district of Miami in 2015. Taken from one of the under construction Brickell City Center towers.

The term "Manhattanization" has been used to describe high rise building booms in Miami, starting with the 2003–2008 boom of real estate developments that brought the construction of more than 50 high-rise buildings throughout the city. As conditions in Latin America destabilized, many of Latin America's elites sought refuge in the city, especially in the Brickell area where Latin American money poured into the development of many of the urban center's condos.

A second and third housing market boom took place in Miami from 2012 to 2017, and then from 2021 to present(As of November 2026). Along with the over ten thousand residential units added, the downtown area saw a revitalization and an increased prevalence of walking and public transport usage, similar to Manhattan. Miami finally saw its first supertall skyscraper in 2026, when the Waldorf Astoria Miami became the city's tallest building.

Miami is sometimes likened to a "southern Manhattan" not only for its high rises, but for its large financial district. Miami is now the US city with the third most skyscrapers (behind New York City and Chicago). It is also ranked fourth in North America behind New York City, Chicago, and Toronto, which is also seeing a large building boom in the 2020s.

== San Francisco ==
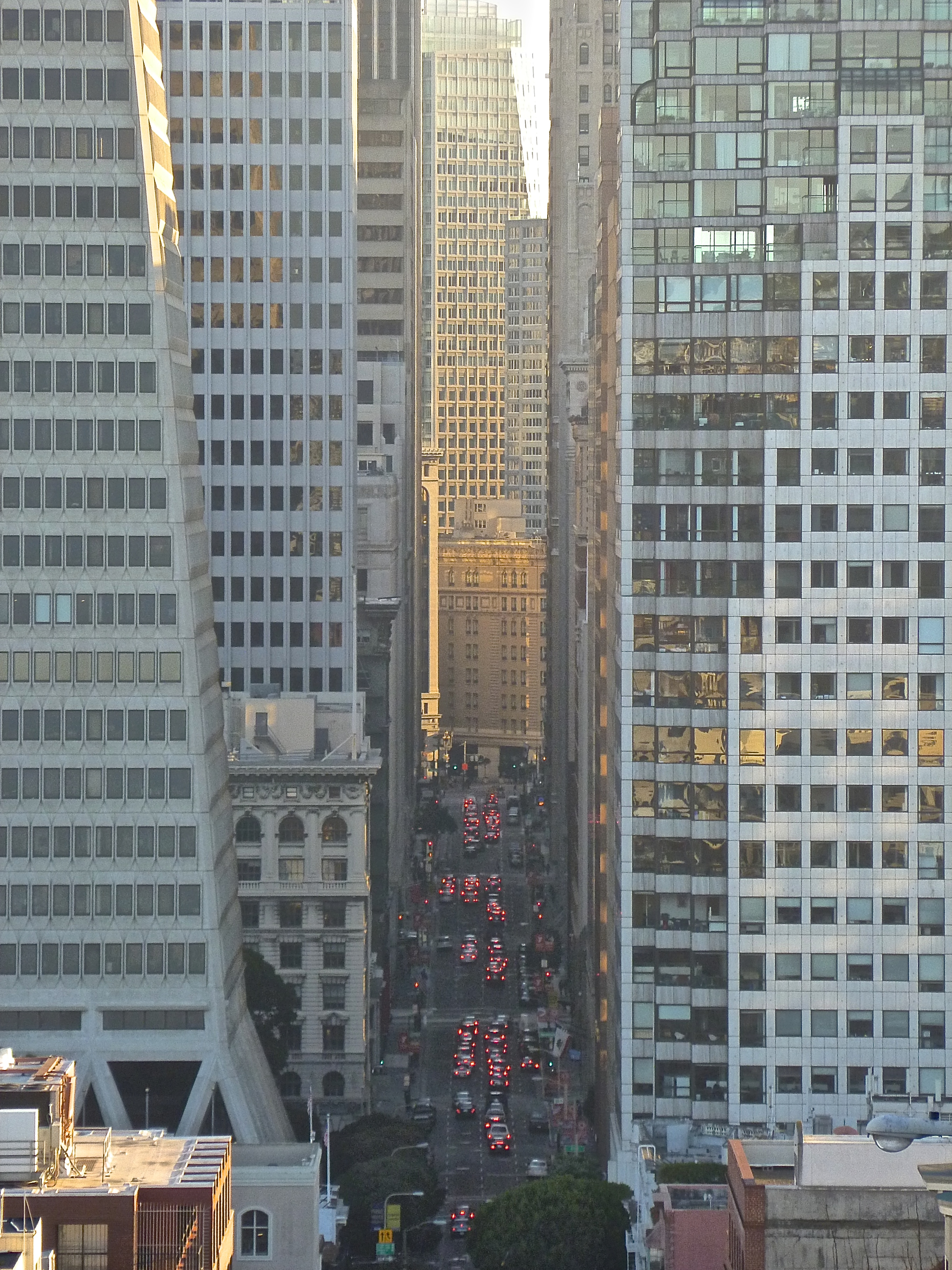
Montgomery Street in Financial District, San Francisco, showing an urban canyon

The term "Manhattanization" was initially used to describe the construction of large skyscrapers in San Francisco's Financial District in the 1970s. Since then, tall buildings have proliferated in San Francisco. This has expanded to the South of Market neighborhood. From 2000 to 2018, more than 15 buildings taller than 30 stories were built. There are now over 160 buildings taller than 73 metres (240 ft).

Proposition M (1986) slowed high-rise growth through the rest of the 20th century, but because of the Dot-com bubble of the late 1990s and early 2000s, and the tech explosion since then, tall buildings have proliferated in San Francisco. This has expanded to the South of Market neighborhood. From 2000 to 2018, more than 15 buildings taller than 30 stories were built. By 2019, there were more than 160 buildings taller than 73 metres (240 ft). Prop. M's limits came back into play in 2014 because, for the first time in nearly 15 years, demand for commercial office space from companies like Google, LinkedIn, Dropbox, and Pinterest was greater than the cap set by the proposition.

In the context of the California housing shortage, fears of "Manhattanization" have been used by NIMBYs to oppose housing construction. In response, YIMBYs in other states have warned of a "California-style housing crisis" to promote zoning reform.

== Santiago ==
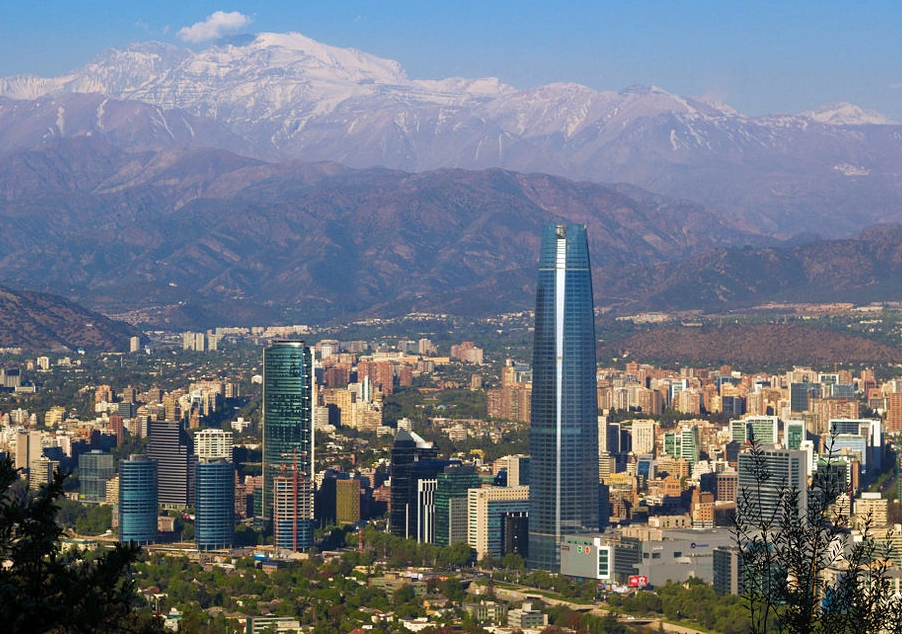
"Sanhattan", in Santiago, Chile

"Sanhattan" has been used as a portmanteau to describe the developed cluster of skyscrapers in Santiago, Chile.

== Toronto ==
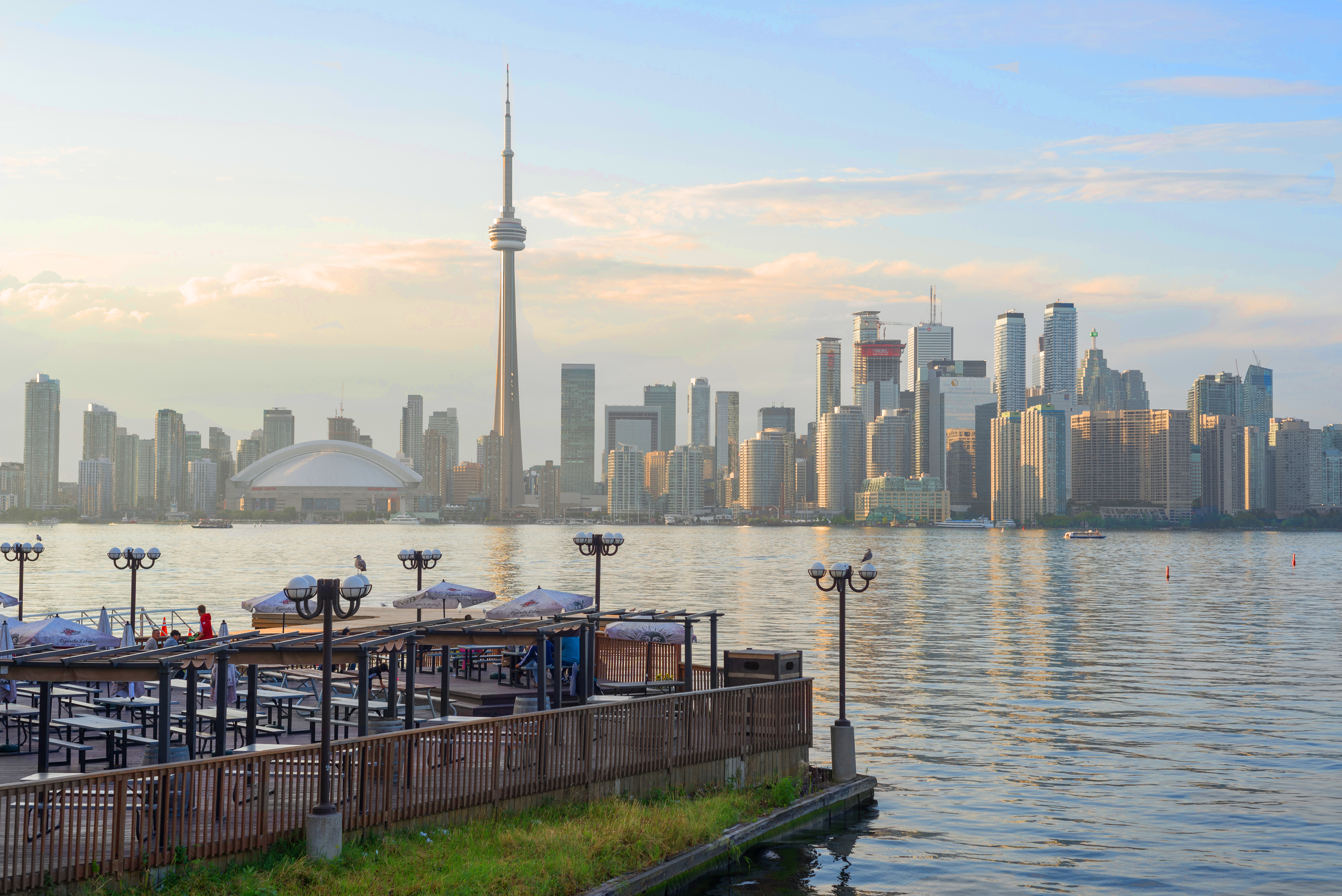
View of Toronto's skyline in 2017 from the Toronto Islands

Downtown Toronto has experienced a construction boom since 2007, primarily in its development of condominiums and other high rise residential towers. In one week of 2014, Toronto's city council approved 755 stories of new development in the city's downtown core. The city's construction boom has continued since then into the 2020s, with many skyscrapers being approved on a weekly basis thanks to relaxed planning laws. These included its first two supertalls in the 2020s, One Bloor West and SkyTower at Pinnacle One Yonge.

== Bogotá ==
The capital city of Colombia has seen skyscraper growth primarily concentrated in the Centro Internacional de Bogotá and Chapinero areas. Bogotá has undergone a revitalization plan that aims to position the Colombian capital as a major hub for international business in Latin America. Bogotá's El Dorado International Airport already handles the largest cargo volume in Latin America with daily cargo and passenger flights from large cities in the region such as Lima, Santiago de Chile, Miami, Mexico City, etc.

== See also ==
- Urban canyon
- Vancouverism
