= Sanhattan =

Major business district in Santiago, Chile

Coordinates: 33°24′51.25″S 70°36′17.74″W

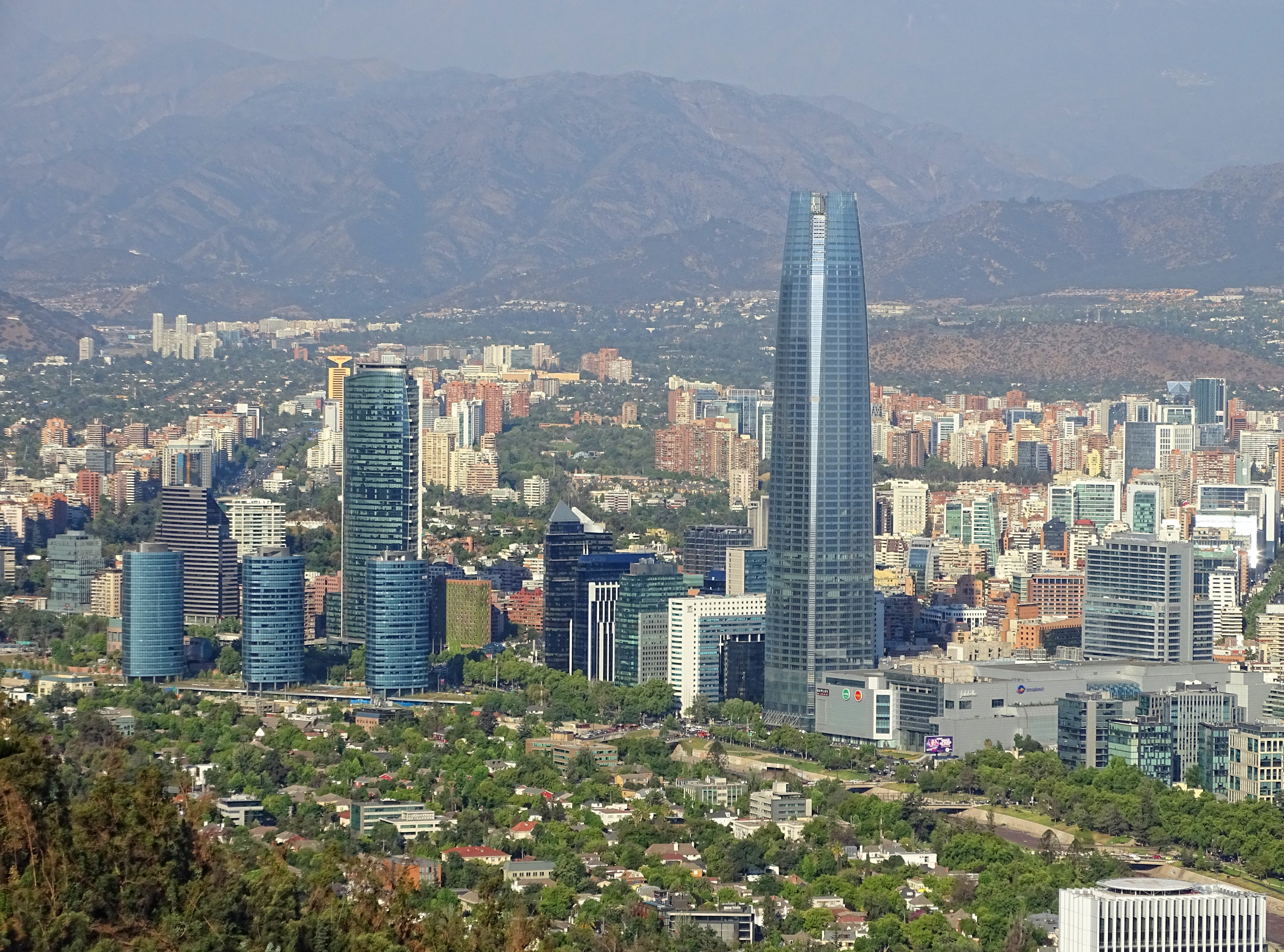
View of Sanhattan from San Cristóbal Hill

Sanhattan, a portmanteau of Santiago and Manhattan, is the popular ironic sobriquet given to the upscale financial district of Santiago, Chile's capital. It is located to the northeast of the metropolis, in the western end of the Las Condes commune, nestled between the Mapocho River and Américo Vespucio avenue, encompassing the El Bosque Norte and El Golf barrios. A narrower definition places it between the intersection of Andrés Bello and Vitacura avenues down to Nueva Los Leones avenue. The central street in Sanhattan is Avenida Apoquindo.

Sanhattan is home to numerous high-end buildings, including offices, restaurants, hotels, shopping centers, and banks. The district boasts two of the tallest buildings in South America, the Titanium La Portada, a 55-story tower which is 194 meters in height, and the Gran Torre Santiago, a 300-meter, 63-story tower located in the nearby Providencia commune.

== History ==
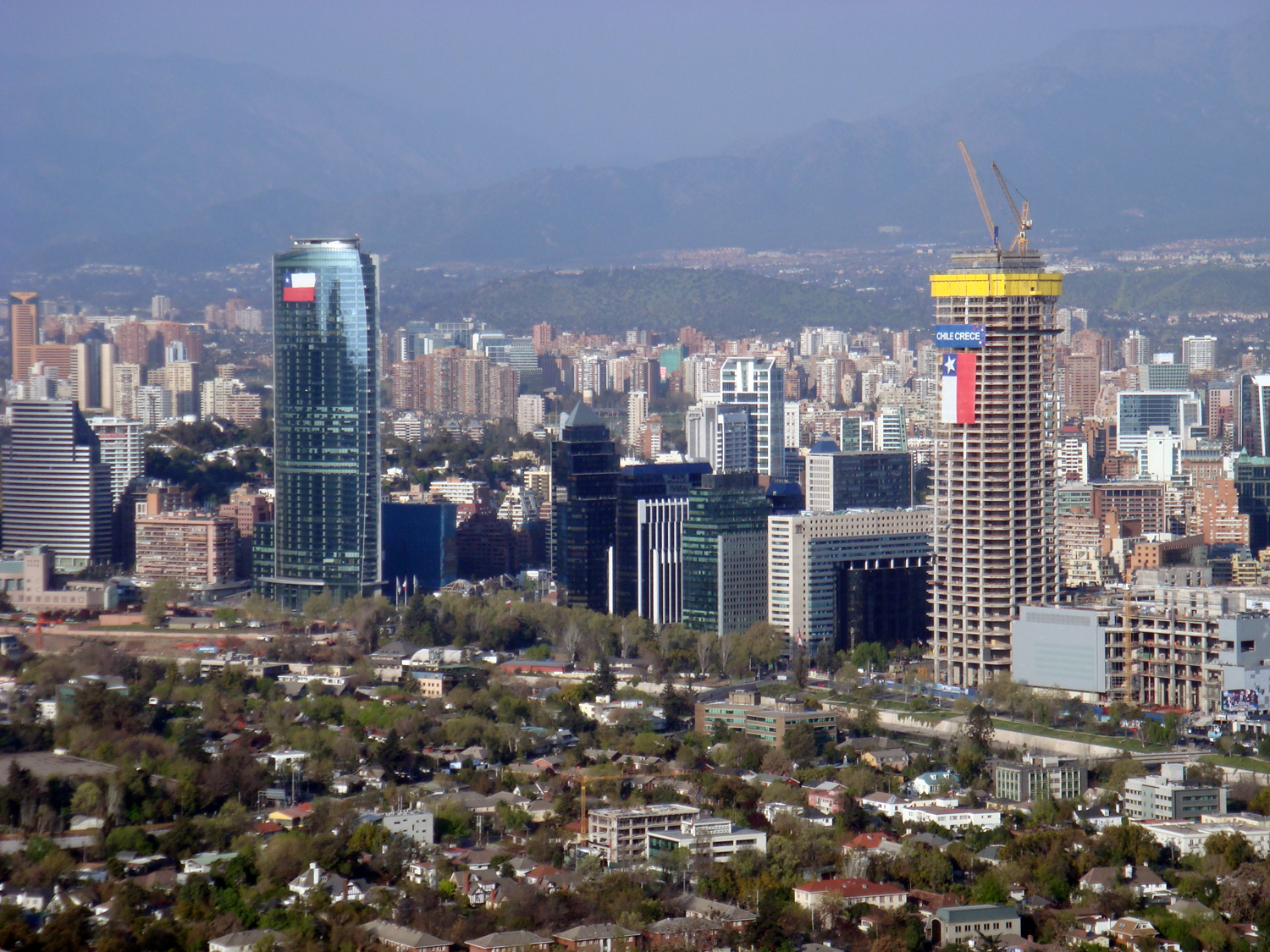
Gran Torre Santiago (seen under construction in 2010) and Titanium La Portada (left) are the two tallest buildings in Sanhattan.

The land, known then as "Hacienda San Luis", was acquired in 1907 from Banco de Chile bank by Ricardo Lyon, an agriculturist and mayor of Providencia commune. In 1937, a zoning scheme for Las Condes commune was defined. Architect Eduardo Lewellyn-Jones was entrusted with the task of designing a new residential area for Santiago's aristocracy. It was not until the early 1990s that real estate agencies set their sights on the area.

Today Sanhattan is among the most expensive areas of land in Chile, with an average cost of 200 Unidad de Fomento (about US$8,300) per square meter in 2010.

== Extent ==
According to newspaper La Tercera, Sanhattan is bounded by Av. Presidente Riesco to the north, El Golf to the east, Av. Apoquindo and Tajamar to the south, and the Mapocho river to the west.

== Transport ==
There are few parking sites around Sanhattan, so many people travel by subway or microbus. Line 1 of the city subway is located nearby. Sanhattan is surrounded by the Costanera Norte Highway.

== See also ==
- Manhattan
- Mainhattan
- Manhattanization
