= Centenario Tower =

Skyscraper in Santiago, Chile

Coordinates: 33.4382°S 70.6454°W

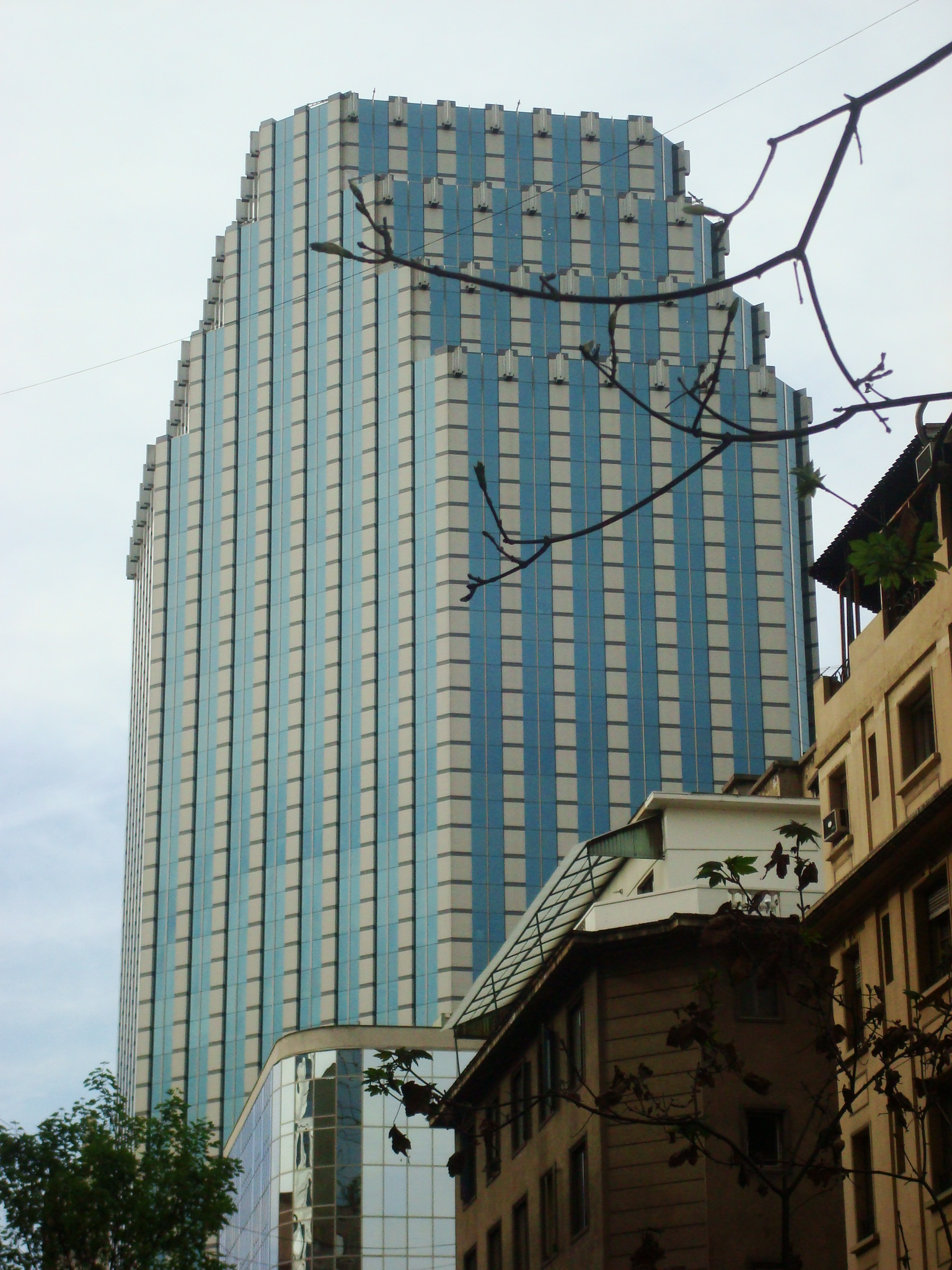

The Centenario Tower (Spanish: Torre Centenario) is a skyscraper office building in Santiago, the capital of Chile.

It was finished in 2000 and has 31 floors, of which 5 are basement. It has a floor area of 48,500m² and a height of 371 feet (112 metres).

== See also ==
- List of tallest buildings in Chile
- List of tallest buildings in South America
- List of tallest towers in the world
