= Mirador Playa Brava =

Skyscraper in Iquique, Chile

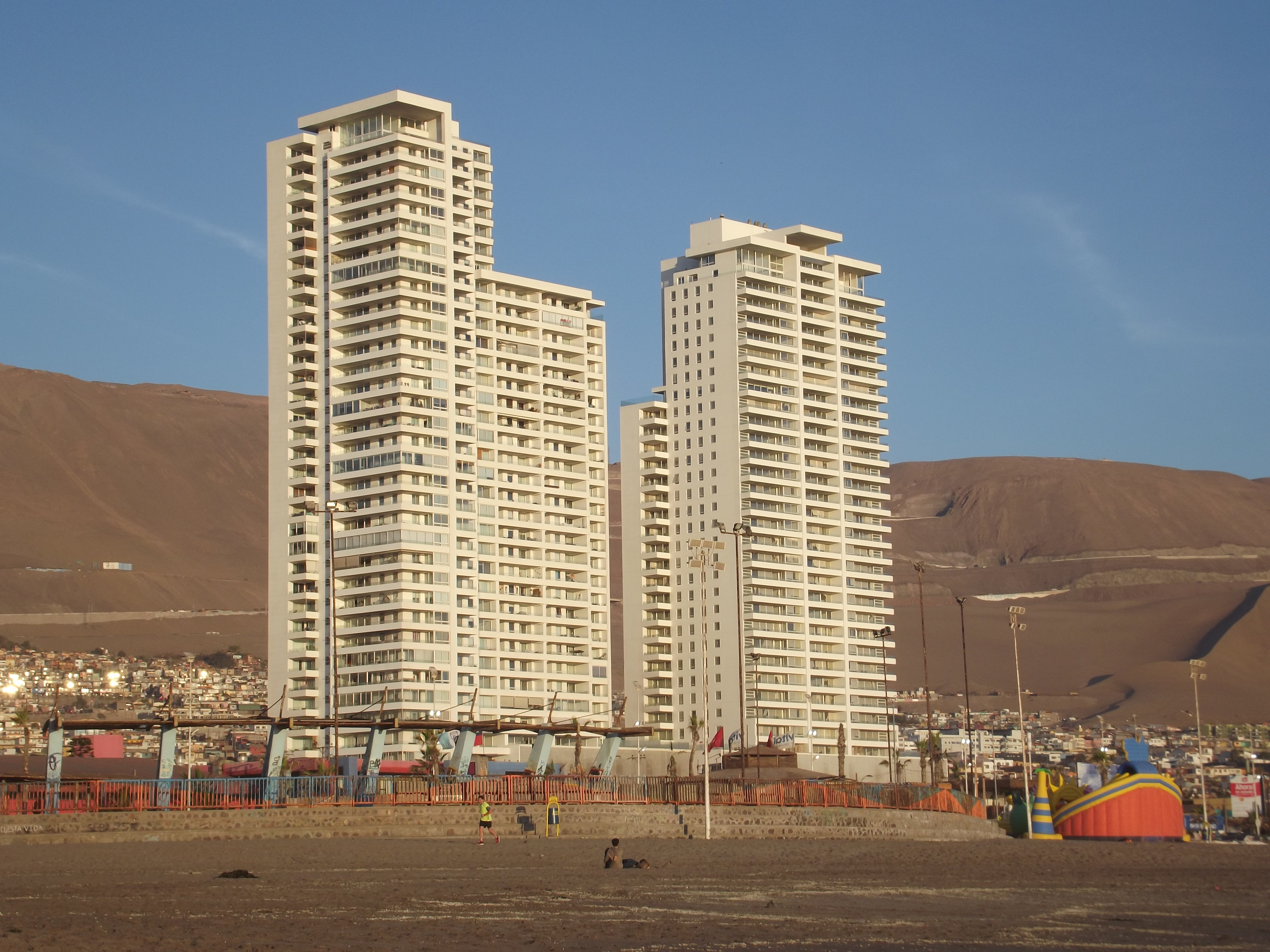
- Interactive map of the Mirador Playa Brava area

General information
- Status: Completed
- Type: Residential
- Location: Iquique, Chile, 2989 Calle Manuel Plaza, 1100000 Iquique, Tarapacá, Chile
- Coordinates: 20.24549°S 70.13910°W
- Construction started: 2012
- Completed: 2017

Height
- Roof: 135.7 m (445 ft) (Tower 1); 124.7 m (409 ft) (Tower 1)

Technical details
- Structural system: Concrete
- Floor count: 36 (+2 underground) (Tower 1); 37 (+2 underground) (Tower 2)

Design and construction
- Architect: Hernan Mora Diez

The Mirador Playa Brava is a high-rise residential building complex in Iquique, Chile. Built between 2012 and 2017, the complex consists of two towers standing at 95 m (312 ft) tall with 36 floors (Tower 1) respectively 91 m (299 ft) tall with 37 floors (Tower 2). The towers are the current 4th and 6th tallest building in Chile.

== History ==
The Mirador Playa Brava building complex is located between Av. Arturo Prat Chacón, a highly transitioned boulevard and the Sagasca and Manuel Plaza Street, in front of Playa Brava on the Iquique waterfront, providing excellent accessibility and connectivity with the center and south of the city. Close to these buildings are various facilities such as the Arturo Prat University, the Playa Brava Park, the City Skate Park, supermarkets, shops, plazas and schools.

=== Architecture ===
The building complex is located in Iquique, in the first region of Chile, which was inaugurated in 2017. Mirador Playa Brava has two tall skyscrapers; the first (Mirador Playa Brava I), with 36 floors plus 2 underground and with 135.70 metres 1 high, is considered the tallest building in the Tarapacá Region of Northern Chile and the tallest outside the Metropolitan Region, until the construction of the Puerto Montt Tower, while the second (Mirador Playa Brava II) has 34 floors plus 2 underground, and stands at 124.70 metres high.

In 2012, when the project's groundbreaking was officialized, it was originally to have 5 buildings, ranging from 29 to 37 stories; three 37-story buildings, and two 29-story towers, which is different from what the final result consisted of. The two 36 and 34-story building were completed as there is no further information of the other buildings' fate.

=== Construction ===
Mirador Playa Brava I is the tallest building in Iquique, providing a strategic location on the seafront and is surrounded by various basic services and commerce. It benefits from accessibility and connectivity with the center and south of the city, and being a construction on the seafront, it ensures a view of Playa Brava, the pedestrian promenade and the city. The building blends into the plaza and green areas. It was located right at the waterfront, in order to create a distance from the buildings, giving them a greater presence. The building has 36 floors, with 2 underground designed for parking lots. The first 4 floors above ground level form a slab which acts as reinforcement against possible surges or tsunamis. The fifth level of the building houses social areas. The next 32 levels house apartment units which can vary between 2 and 4-bedroom suites. On the 29th floor, there is an inflection point in the continuity of the home with direct access, but at the same time sheltered and set back from the waterfront. The last levels display terraces, swimming pools, a gym and multipurpose rooms. On the 29th floor, a viewing platform and 2 recreation rooms equipped with barbecue areas and services were set.

Mirador Playa Brava II is the second phase of the Mirador Playa Brava complex, which offers a privileged location on the seafront and surrounded by various basic services and shops. A 1,780 m^{2} plaza and green areas located right on the corner of Sagasca and Arturo Prat streets, as a viewpoint facing the sea, creating a distance from the buildings and giving the complex greater presence. It also provides accessibility and connectivity with the center and south of the city and, due to its location, ensures a unique view of Playa Brava, the pedestrian promenade and the city. The building has 34 floors plus 2 underground floors for parking. The first four floors, above ground level, form a slab for parking, which acts as a reinforcement against possible surges from the sea or tsunamis. Above this is a recreational level and from there 29 levels are built for 1, 2, 3 and 4 bedroom homes, and on the 26th floor there is an inflection point in the continuity of the home. It has 2,480 m^{2} for green areas and recreation. Fifth floor with terraces, swimming pools, spa, gym and multipurpose room. 26th floor with 2 viewing terraces, equipped with barbecue areas and services.

== Gallery ==
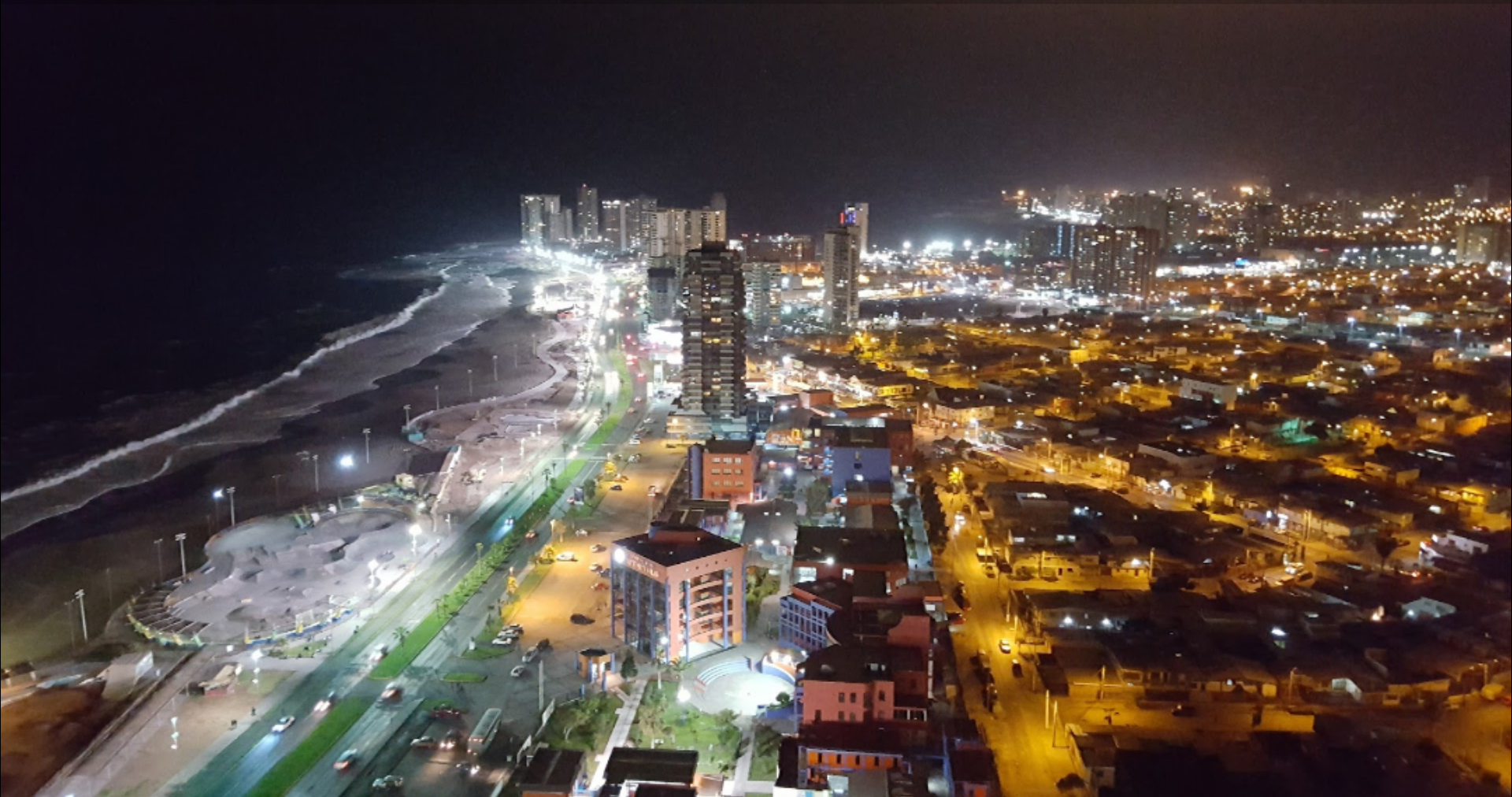
Night view of Iquique from the 36th floor of Mirador Playa Brava

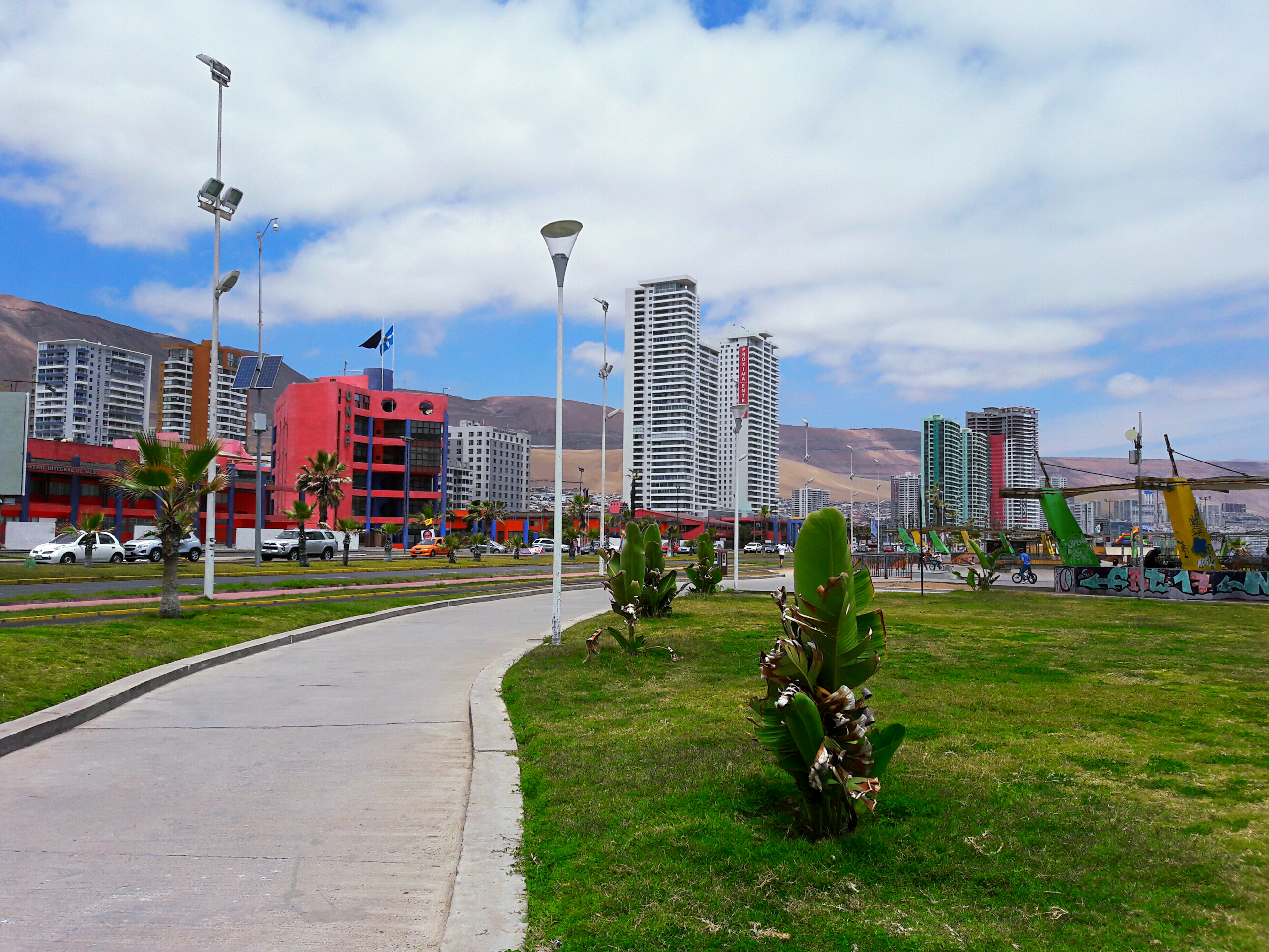
Playa Brava Viewpoint from Playa Brava Park

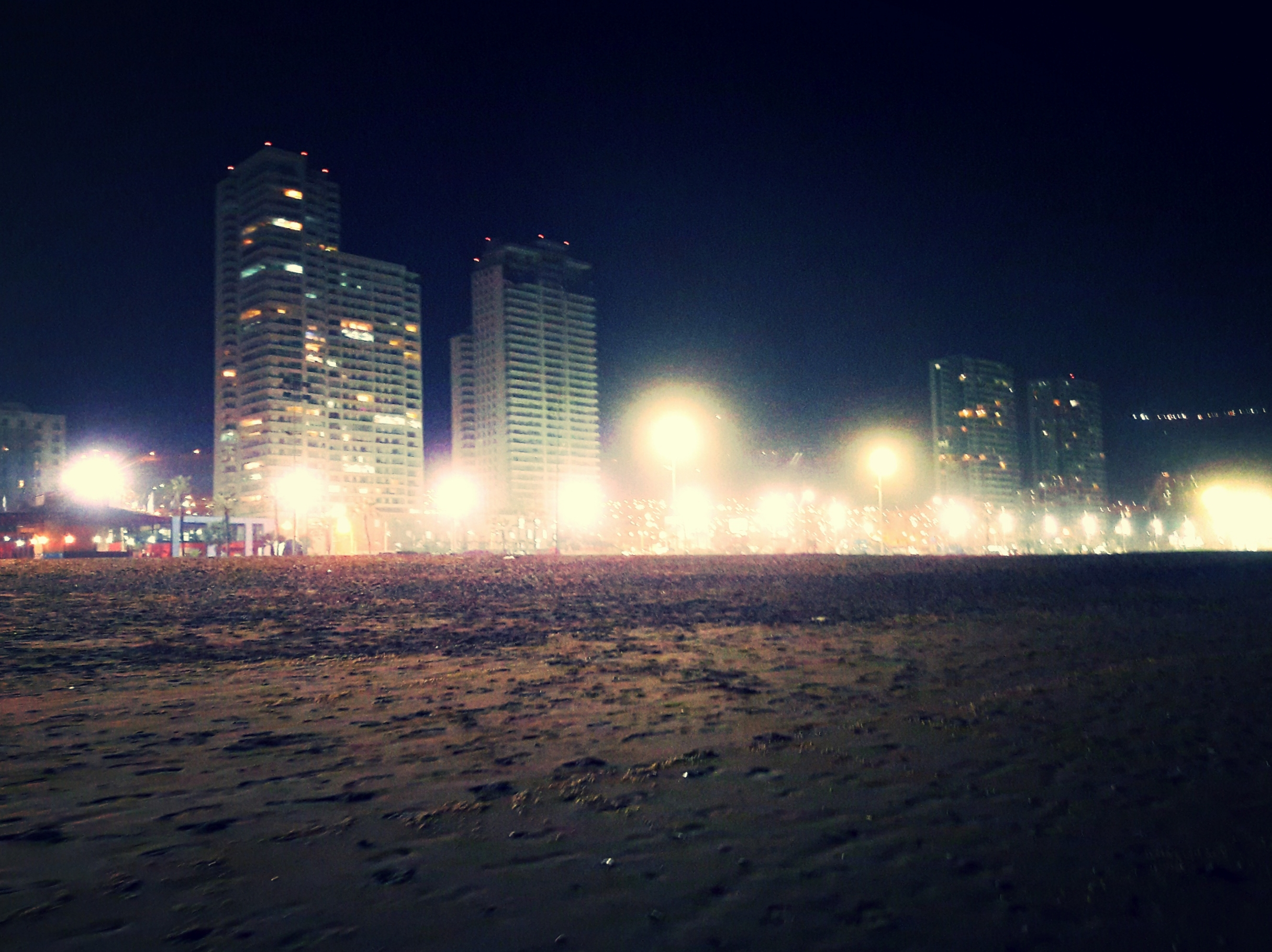
Night view of the Mirador Playa Brava building

== See also ==
- List of tallest buildings in Chile
- List of tallest buildings in South America
