= Torre Telefónica Chile =

Skyscraper in Santiago, Chile

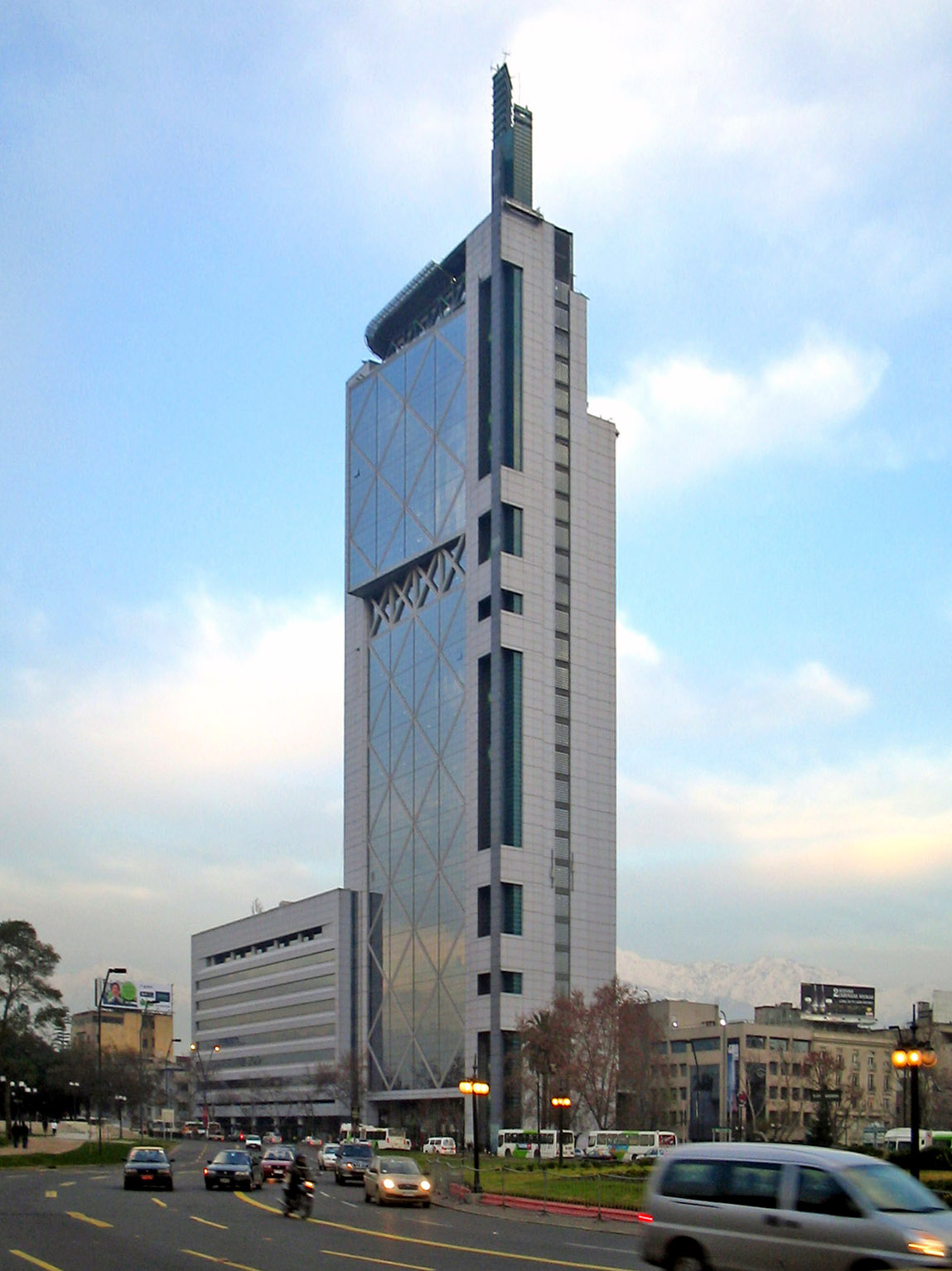
- Interactive map of the Torre Telefónica Chile area

General information
- Status: Completed
- Type: Office
- Location: Santiago, Chile, 111 Providencia Avenue, 7500776 Providencia, Región Metropolitana, Chile
- Coordinates: 33.43701°S 70.63277°W
- Construction started: 1993
- Completed: 1996
- Cost: US$ 75 Million

Height
- Roof: 143 m (469 ft)

Technical details
- Structural system: Reinforced concrete
- Floor count: 34
- Floor area: 63,000 m^{2} (678,000 sq ft)
- Lifts/elevators: 8 (Schindler)

Design and construction
- Architect: Iglesis Prat Arquitectos
- Structural engineer: René Lagos Engineers
- Main contractor: Movistar

Website
- Metropolitan Center

Torre Telefónica Chile (Spanish for Telephone Tower Chile) formerly known as Edificio CTC is an office skyscraper in the Providencia district of Santiago, Chile. Built between 1993 and 1996, the tower stands at 143 m (469 ft) tall with 34 floors and is the current 3rd tallest building in Chile.

== History ==
With 143 meters in height and 34 floors, the building previously held the title of the tallest in Chile between 1996 and 1999 when it was surpassed by the Marriott Hotel Santiago de Chile. It is also considered (like the Entel Tower) an architectural landmark in the city, due to its modern architecture and strategic location, highlighting the visual and urban axis that represents the Bustamante Park between the communes of Providencia and Santiago. Its design represents a mobile phone from the 1990s, a current form of telecommunications.

== Architecture ==
The Iglesis Prat Arquitectos office won the competition for the tower's future design in 1992. The complex comprises three buildings: the main tower, the twin building and a smaller one located on Avenida Bustamante.

=== Main tower and twin building ===
It is 143 metres high up to the spiral and 132 metres high to the top floor. It has 32 floors and a helipad on level 35, making it visible from a large part of the capital. Inside it has eight programmable elevators with a capacity for 23 people each. Four are high-speed and reach a maximum advance of 6.3 metres per second. In addition, this tower has a surface area of 63,000 square metres, is capable of housing 2,100 people in their respective work stations on open floors and a digital telephone exchange with a capacity of 3,000 lines served.

Attached to the Main Tower, it retains the same façade as the latter, but is only 9 stories high. On its first floor, it houses conference rooms that look out onto the atrium of the Bustamante Building, as well as a customer service point and the exhibition hall of the Telefónica Foundation called Espacio; both are accessible from the east end of the building facing Avenida Providencia.

=== Bustamante building ===
Its entrance, unlike the rest of the building, is on Avenida General Bustamante, making it almost invisible to passersby and often mistaken for a separate building. The five floors house mostly the Movistar business area. It is separated from the complex by an interior atrium that houses the Telecommunications Museum, a second exhibition hall and the company's auditorium, with capacity for 300 people. At its recently remodeled entrance, public access gardens and a branch of the Starbucks coffee shop were installed .

== Popular culture ==
=== Impact ===
Open television channels have made numerous reports from its heliport, using as scenery the panoramic views of the city of Santiago that can be obtained from there; the most emblematic case was the television program Plaza Italia on Channel 2 Rock & Pop, which in its credits showed a nocturnal Santiago looking west, where the Plaza Baquedano is located. For several years, in addition, a robotic camera installed on the building's mast provided Chilean networks with a 360° panoramic view of the city.

The helipad has also served as a location for the music videos for "Bolsa De Mareo" by Los Tres (1997) and "I Wanna Give My Heart" by Denise Rosenthal (2011).

In July 2011, the Wallpeople project was carried out in a space 50 metres long by 2.2 metres high on the western wall of the Telefónica building, where anyone could stick a personal photograph of a happy moment with adhesive tape, and take one of another person, while paintings and live music were on display.

In August 2019, Movistar officially announced the sale of the building, citing cost-saving reasons and the advancement of teleworking among its employees. 6 However, it ruled out completely emptying it for the moment.

Since the beginning of the protests in October 2019, and because Plaza Baquedano is the nerve center of the demonstrations, the entire area around the building and its entrances were fenced with iron plates.

=== Reviews ===
On July 12, 2016, the technology site Tech Insider published a critique of its architecture, calling it an outdated design and a "shameful monstrosity" because its structure resembles a 1990s cell phone, with an antenna on its side, this despite the fact that at the time of its inauguration this design was then the latest in mobile telephony, and therefore, its evocation was intended to symbolize innovation and technological avant-garde.

== See also ==
- List of tallest buildings in Chile
- List of tallest buildings in South America

Records
Preceded by Torre de la Industria	Tallest building in Chile; 1996–2010	Succeeded by Titanium La Portada
