= Mainhattan =

Skyline of Frankfurt's central business district

Coordinates: 50°06′38″N 8°40′27″E

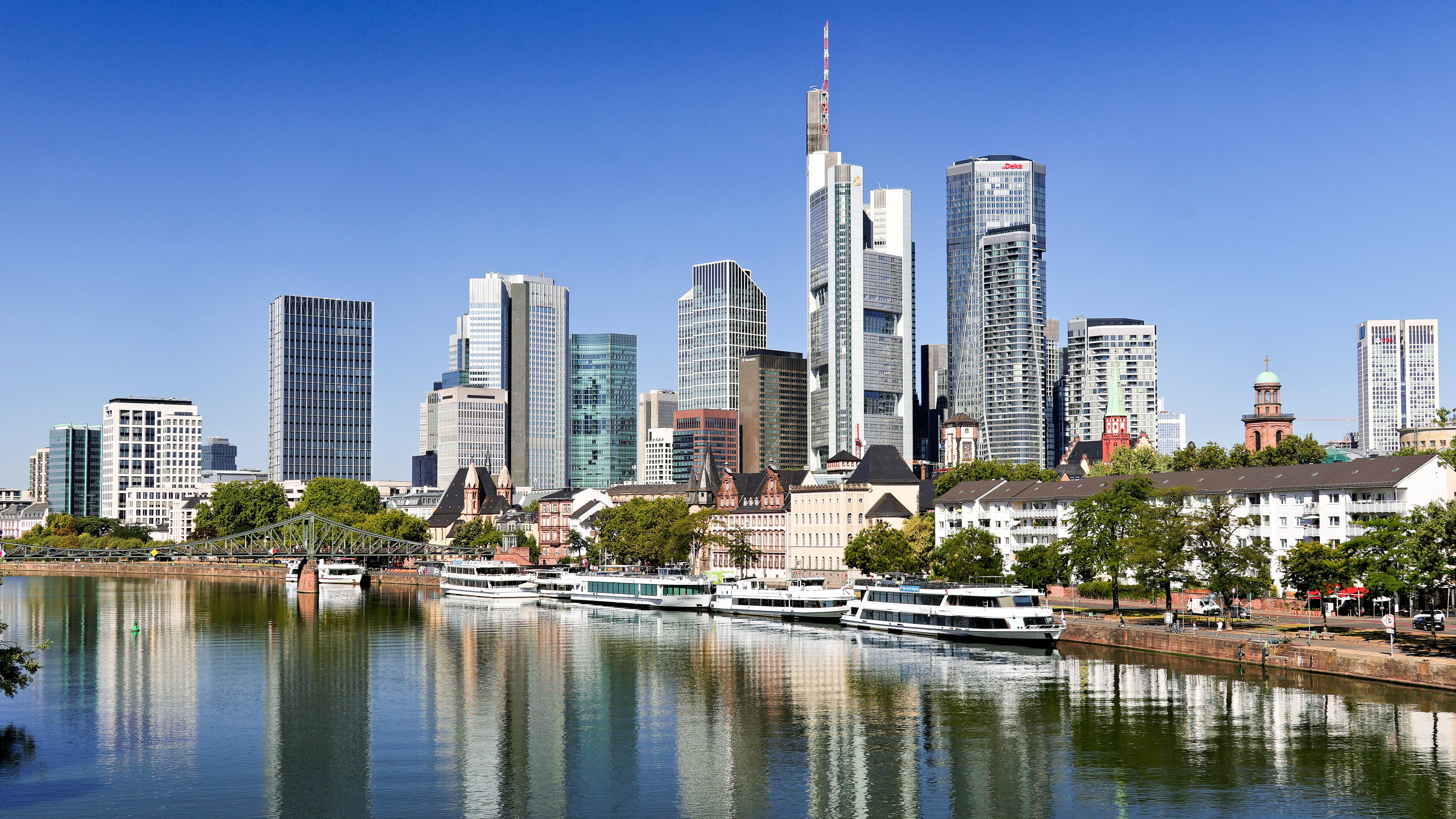
Skyline of Frankfurt at day

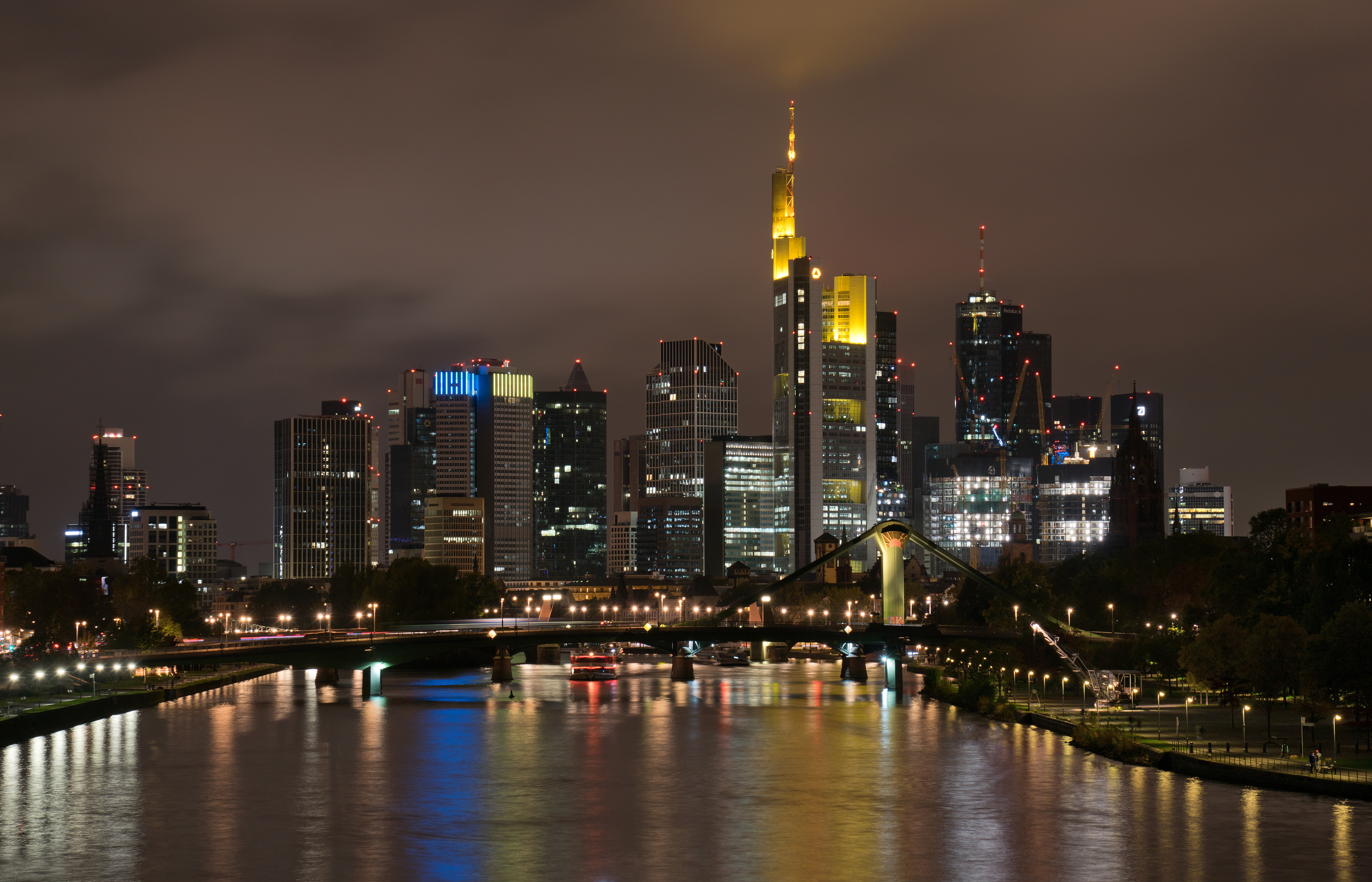
Frankfurt skyline at night

Mainhattan is a term referring to Frankfurt's skyline, especially that of its central business district, the Bankenviertel. The word is a portmanteau of Main, the river on which Frankfurt lies, and Manhattan, a reference to the inner city area's visually impressive high rises and skyscrapers, a special feature for a European city. Together with the historically important Imperial Cathedral of Saint Bartholomew and St. Paul's Church, these buildings form the skyline of the city.

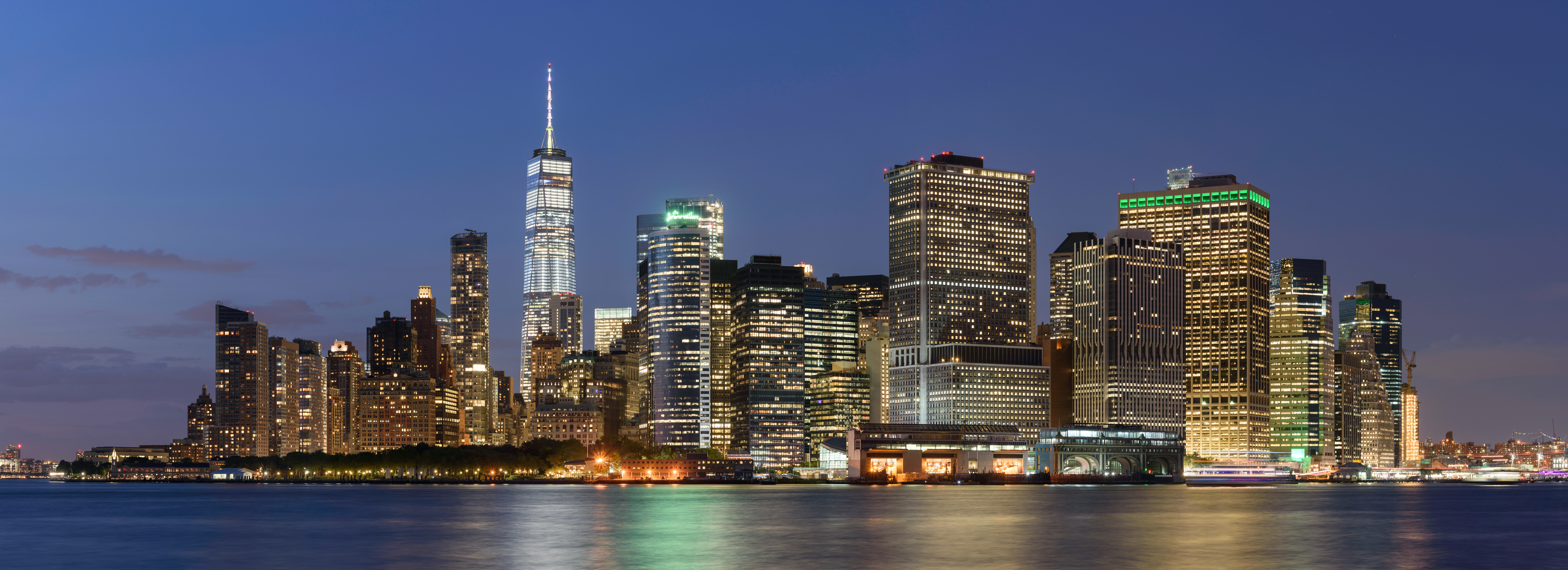
For comparison: skyline of Manhattan

The first tall buildings were built in the 1960s. Banks and other financial institutions settled there, which resulted in the district also being referred to as "Bankfurt" (Bankford). Originally, both expressions were sometimes used derisively, but the connotation has changed to a purely positive one.

The seat of the European Central Bank is located in Mainhattan. The Commerzbank Tower was the tallest building in the European Union until the Shard in London was built. After the United Kingdom voted to withdraw from the European Union (Brexit), plans were made for several financial institutions to move from the City of London to Mainhattan. However, a report by the think tank New Financial found that even after Brexit, there is still around five times more international financial activity in the UK than in France and Germany, suggesting that London will remain the most important financial centre on the European continent, ahead of Paris and Frankfurt.

== See also ==
- Sanhattan
- Manhattanization
