= Boulevard Kennedy & Santiago Marriott =

Skyscraper in Santiago, Chile

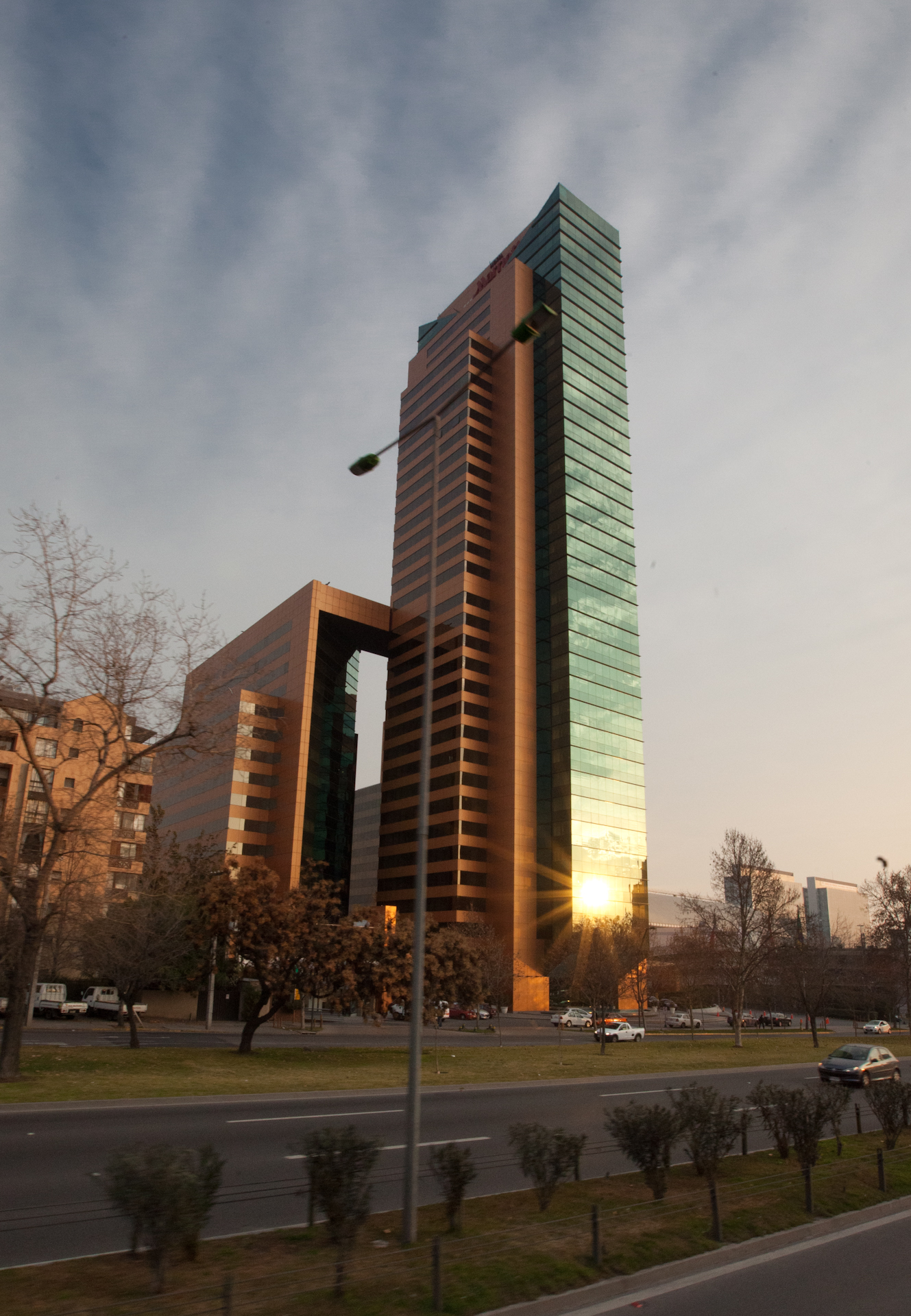
- Interactive map of the Boulevard Kennedy & Santiago Marriott area

General information
- Status: Completed
- Type: Mixed-use: Office / Hotel
- Location: Las Condes, Santiago, Chile, 5741 Av. Pdte. Kennedy, 7560356 Las Condes, Región Metropolitana, Santiago
- Coordinates: 33.39992°S 70.57445°W
- Construction started: 1997
- Completed: 1999
- Cost: US$ 110 Million

Height
- Roof: 129.9 m (426 ft)

Technical details
- Structural system: Reinforced concrete
- Floor count: 40 (+2 underground)
- Floor area: 115,000 m^{2} (1,240,000 sq ft)
- Lifts/elevators: 22

Design and construction
- Architects: Amunátegui, Barró, Ugarte & Associates
- Developer: Inmobiliaria Calle Calle

Website
- Edificio Boulevard Kennedy

Boulevard Kennedy & Santiago Marriott is a mixed-use skyscraper building in the Las Condes district of Santiago, Chile. Built between 1997 and 1999, the tower stands at 129.9 m (426 ft) tall with 40 floors and is the current 5th tallest building in Chile.

== History ==
=== Architecture ===
The building was designed by Amunátegui, Barró, Ugarte & Associates and is located in the Las Condes district of Santiago. It has a total of 22 high-speed elevators that can move up to the speed of 6.4 metres per second and houses a total of 280 rentable luxury rooms. Its construction began in 1997 and was completed in 1999, with an investment of US$110,000,000. The building is anchored with 45 steel and concrete piles that penetrate to a depth of 35 meters, the building can withstand an earthquake of +8.0 on the Richter scale, such as the 2010 Chile earthquake.

== See also ==
- List of tallest buildings in Chile
- List of tallest buildings in South America
