= List of tallest buildings in Chile =

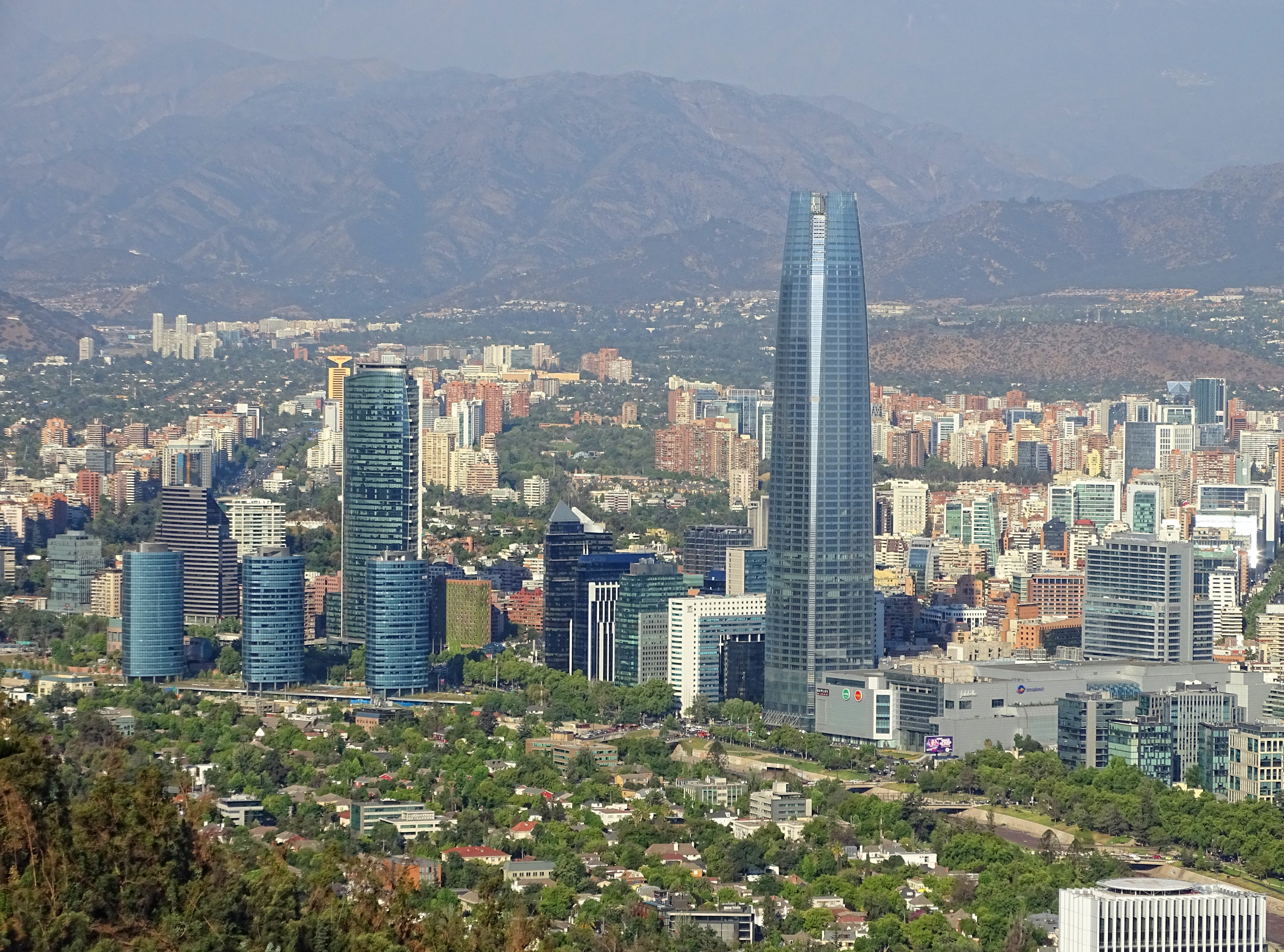
Santiago skyline

This is a list of the tallest buildings in Chile, ranking high-rises that stand at least 95 metres (311 ft) tall.

== Completed ==
Was the tallest building in Chile upon completion

Rank	Name	Image	Height m (ft)	Floors	Year	City	Notes
1	Gran Torre Santiago		300 (984)	62	2013	Santiago	Tallest building in South America
2	Titanium La Portada		205 (639)	52	2010	Santiago	
3	Torre Telefónica Chile		143 (469)	34	1996	Santiago	
4	Mirador Playa Brava Torre 1		135.7 (445)	37	2015	Iquique	
5	Boulevard Kennedy & Santiago Marriott		130 (426)	40	1999	Santiago	
6	Mirador Playa Brava Torre 2		124.7 (409)	34	2016	Iquique	
7	Velamar		121 (396)	33	2013	Iquique	
8=	Torre de la Industria		120 (393)	32	1994	Santiago	
8=	Torre Nueva Santa Maria		120 (393)	30	2017	Santiago	
8=	Bosque 500		120 (393)	24	2001	Santiago	
11	Territoria 3000		118 (387)	31	2008	Santiago	
12	Torre Costanera 4		113 (370)	28	2012	Santiago	
13	Torre Centenario		112 (367)	31	2000	Santiago	
14=	Edificio Santiago Centro		110 (360)	25	1972	Santiago	
14=	Torre Santa María		110 (360)	28	1978	Santiago	
14=	Mandarín Oriental		110 (360)	24	1992	Santiago	
14=	Edificio Millenium		110 (360)	31	2000	Santiago	
18	Torre CCU		105 (344)	28	2007	Santiago	
19	Edificio Palladio		104 (341)	26	2000	Santiago	
20	Torre del Centro		95 (311)	27	2013	Concepción	

== Under construction ==
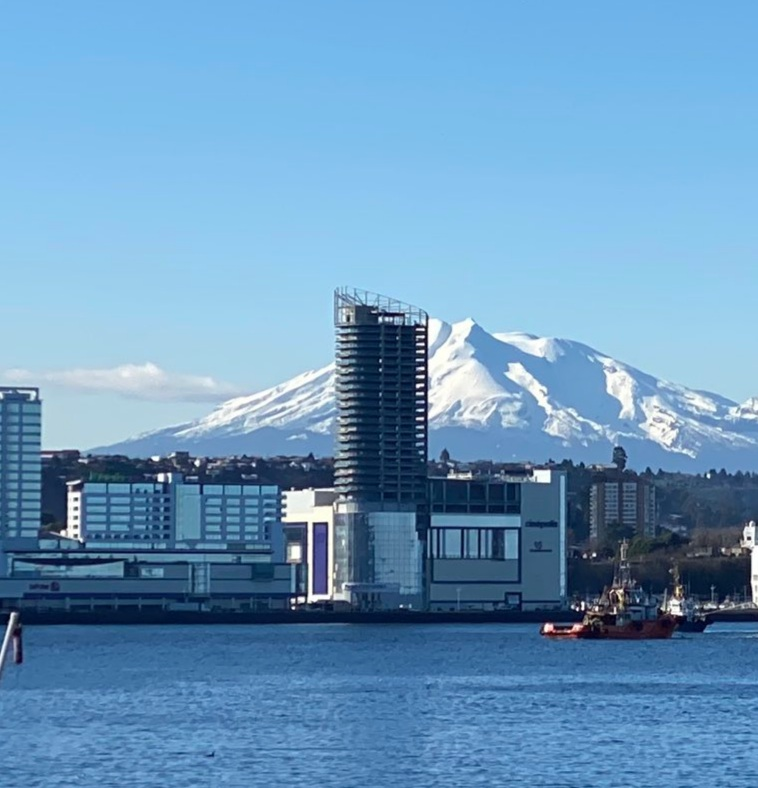
Torre Puerto Montt under construction, June 2020.

Name	Height m (ft)	Floors	Year	City	Notes
Torre Puerto Montt	145 (475)	31	N/D	Puerto Montt	It will be Chile's tallest building outside Santiago

== See also ==
- List of tallest buildings in South America
