= Gran Torre Costanera =

Skyscraper in Santiago, Chile

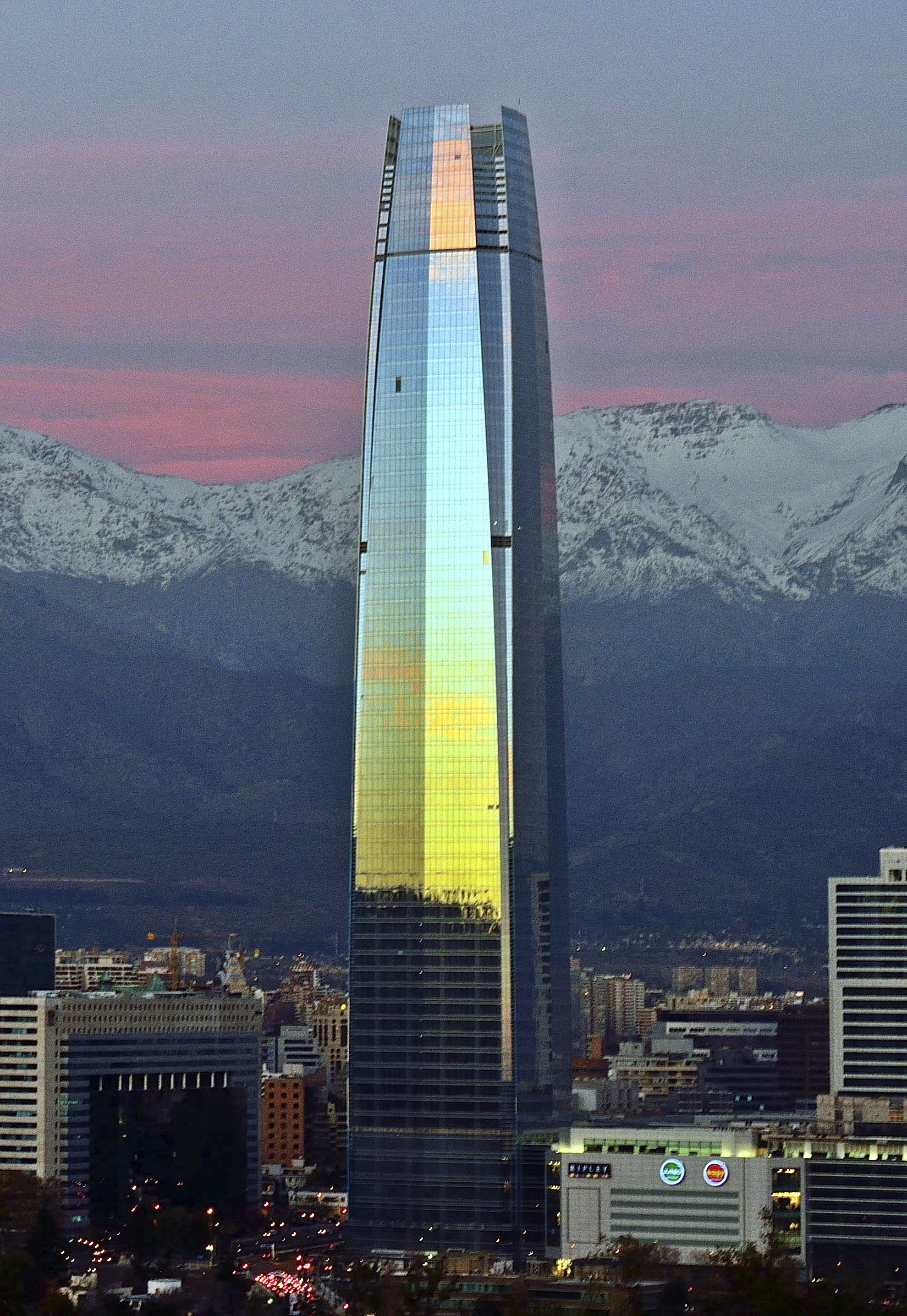
- Gran Torre Costanera in 2013

General information
- Status: Completed
- Type: Office
- Location: Av. Andrés Bello 2457, Providencia, Chile
- Coordinates: 33°25′01″S 70°36′24″W
- Construction started: 18 June 2006; 20 years ago
- Topped-out: 14 February 2012; 14 years ago
- Completed: 2013; 13 years ago
- Cost: US$1 billion

Height
- Architectural: 300 m (984 ft)
- Top floor: 261 m (856 ft)

Technical details
- Floor count: 62 (+6 basement floors)
- Floor area: 107,125 m^{2}
- Lifts/elevators: 24

Design and construction
- Architects: Barreda y Asociados Watt International and César Pelli
- Architecture firm: Pelli Clarke Pelli Architects
- Developer: Cencosud

Gran Torre Costanera, previously known as Costanera Center Torre 2, also known as El Costanera (the Costanera) by locals, and previously known as Torre Gran Costanera, is a 62-story skyscraper in Santiago, Chile. It is the tallest building in South America, the second tallest building in Latin America (behind Mexico's T.Op Torre 1), and the fifth tallest building in the Southern Hemisphere (behind Indonesia's Autograph Tower and Luminary Tower, and Australia's Q1 Tower and Australia 108). The tower was designed by Chilean architects Alemparte Barreda & Asociados, the Argentine architect César Pelli, and the Canadian company Watt International.

== Details ==
Gran Torre is part of the Costanera Center complex, which includes the largest shopping mall in Latin America, two hotels, and two additional office towers. Gran Torre Santiago is 300 metres (980 ft) tall and 64 stories high plus 6 basement floors, with a floor pitch of 41 metres (135 ft) and 107.125 m^{2} (1,153.08 sq ft) in area.

The tower has nearly 700,000 square metres (7,500,000 sq ft) of building space available, built on 47,000 square metres (510,000 sq ft) of land. Planners estimated that there would be some 240,000 people going to and from the site each day. The tower was designed by Chilean architects Alemparte Barreda & Asociados, the Argentine architect Cesar Pelli of Pelli Clarke Pelli Architects, and the Canadian company Watt International. Structural engineering was done by the Chilean company René Lagos y Asociados Ing. Civiles Ltda. Salfa Corp. was responsible for its construction.

== Construction ==
Construction of Gran Torre Costanera began in June 2006 and was expected to be completed in 2010, but it was put on hold in January 2009 due to the Great Recession. Work on the project resumed on 17 December 2009.

In early November 2010, standing 205 m (673 ft) tall, it overtook the neighboring Titanium La Portada to become the tallest building in Chile. In February 2011, La Segunda daily reported that, at 226 m (741 ft) tall, the tower had overtaken Caracas's Twin Towers to become the tallest building in South America, while La Tercera newspaper reported in February 2012 that it had achieved that feat on 12 April 2011.

Structural work on the tower was completed in July 2011, and the maximum height of 300 m (980 ft) was achieved on 14 February 2012, making it the tallest building in Latin America. In 2013, the tower was completed.

== Observation deck ==
On 11 August 2015, an observation deck, called "Sky Costanera", was opened to the public on floors 61 and 62, offering 360° views of Santiago.

== Gallery ==
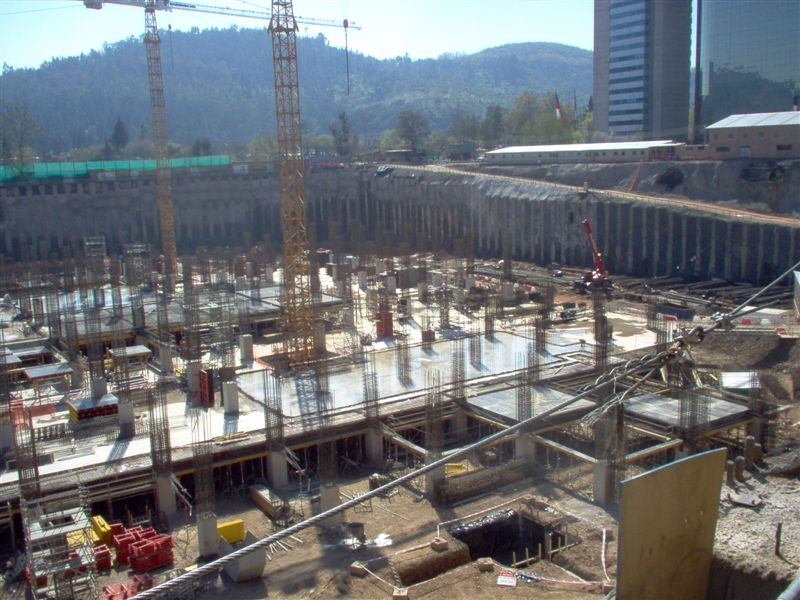
September 2006

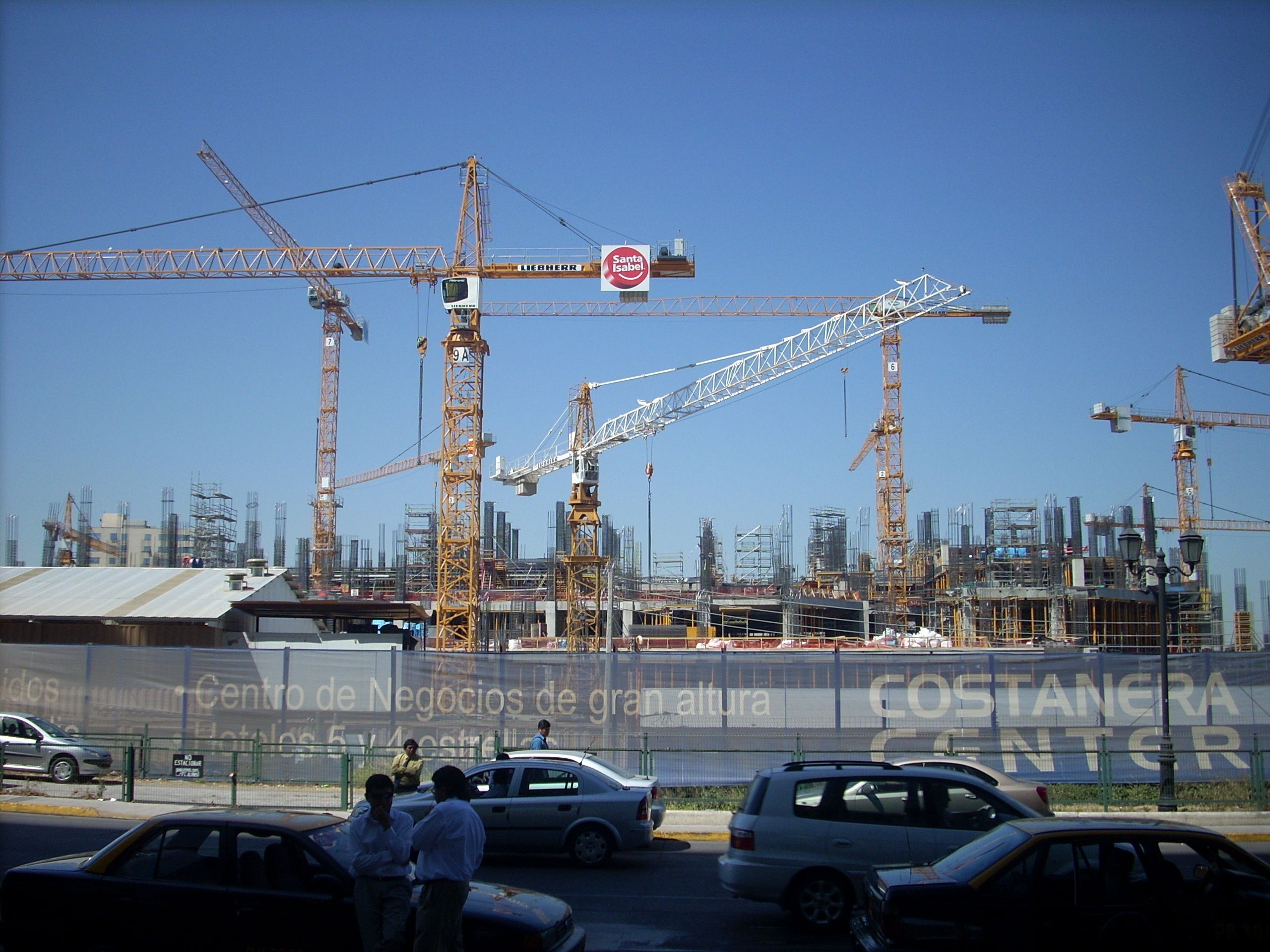
December 2007

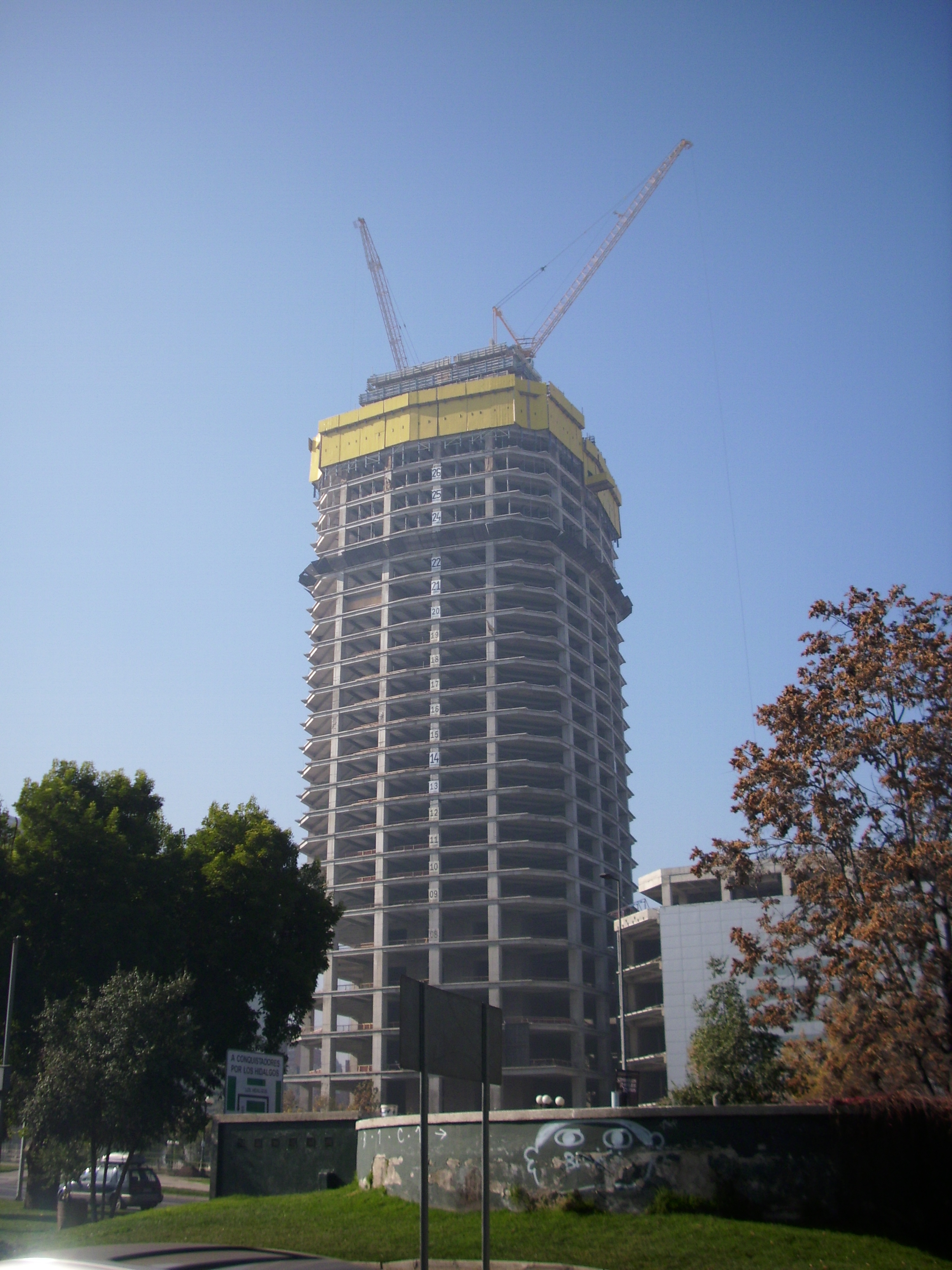
June 2010

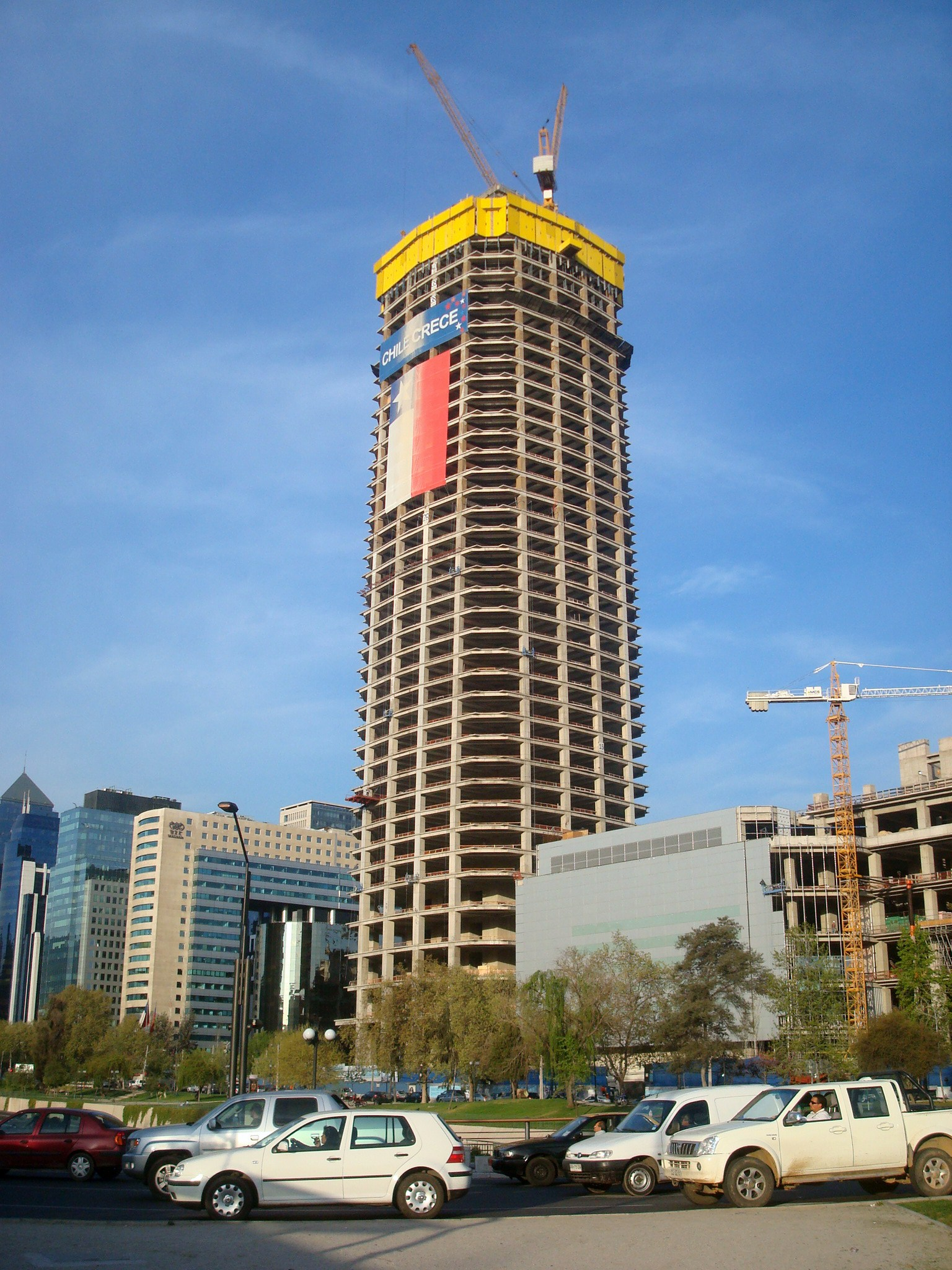
September 2010

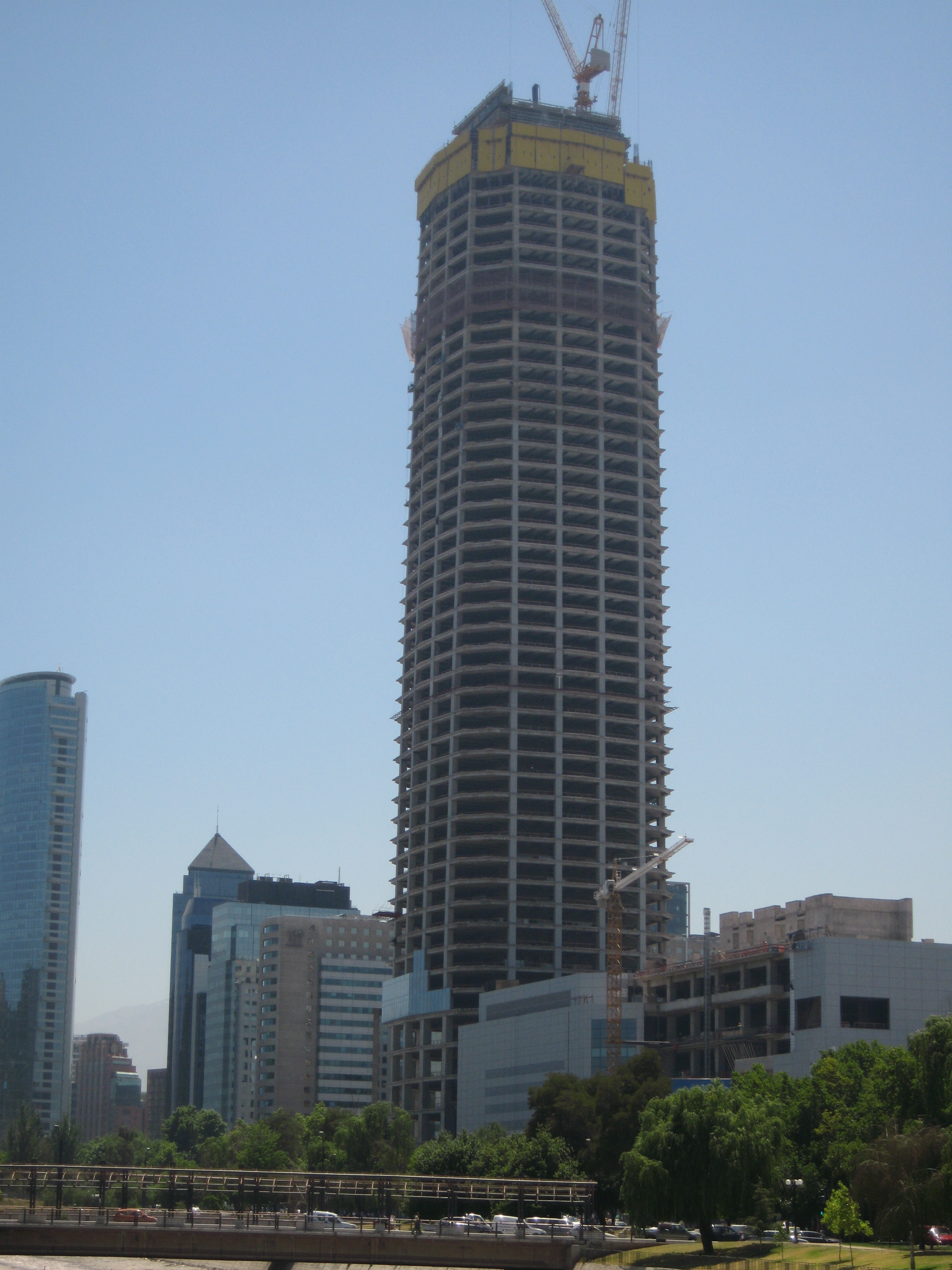
January 2011

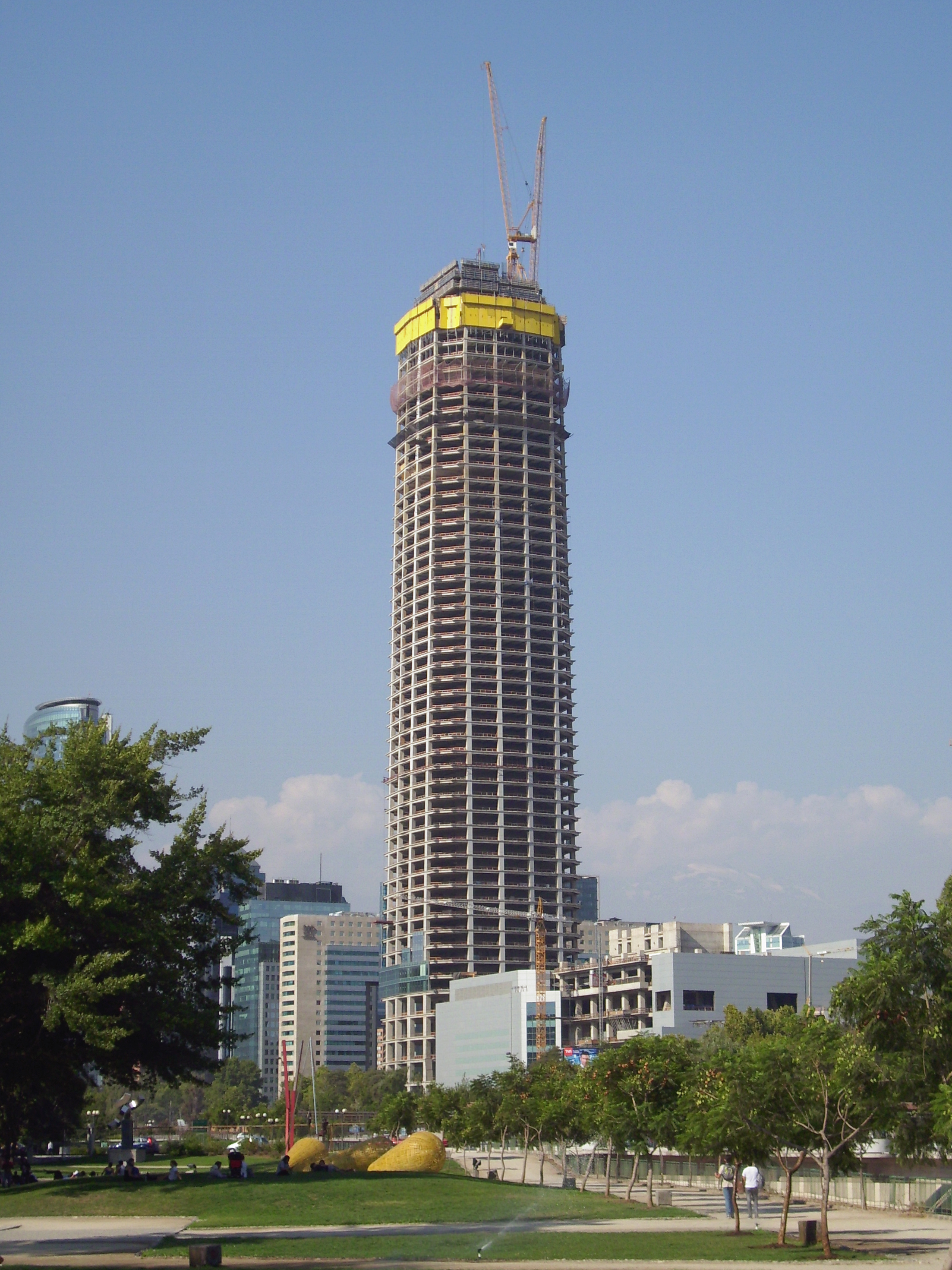
March 2011

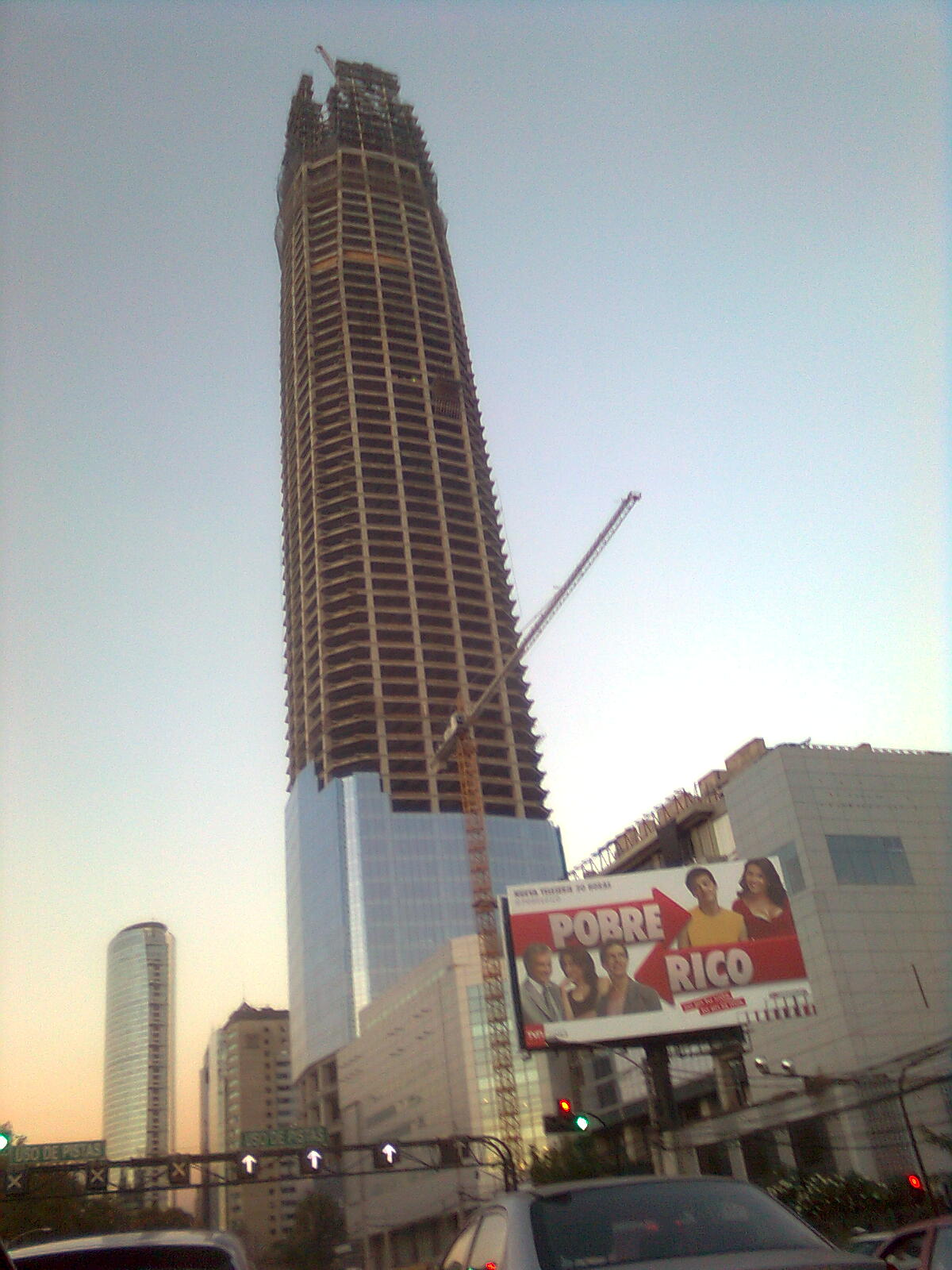
March 2012

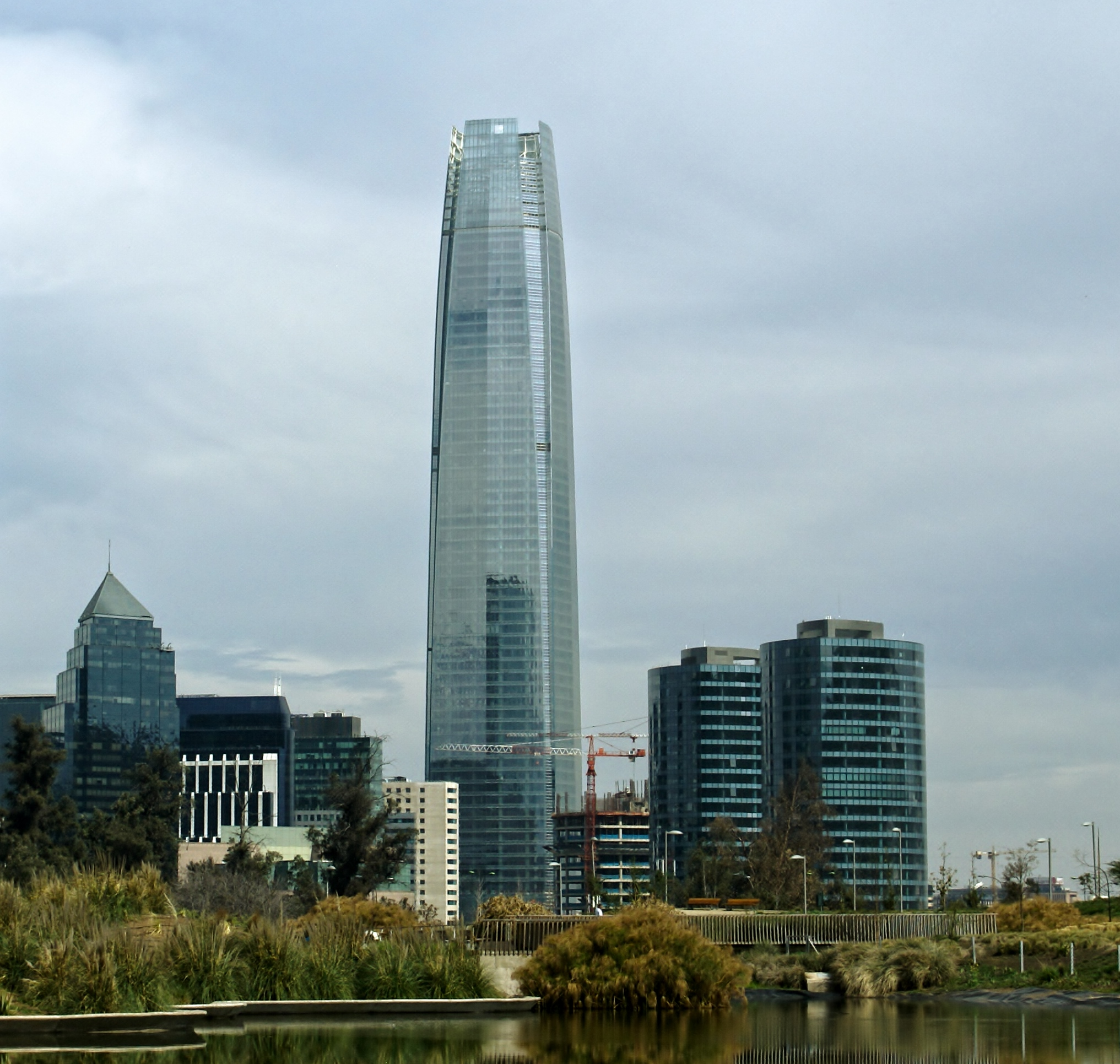
September 2013

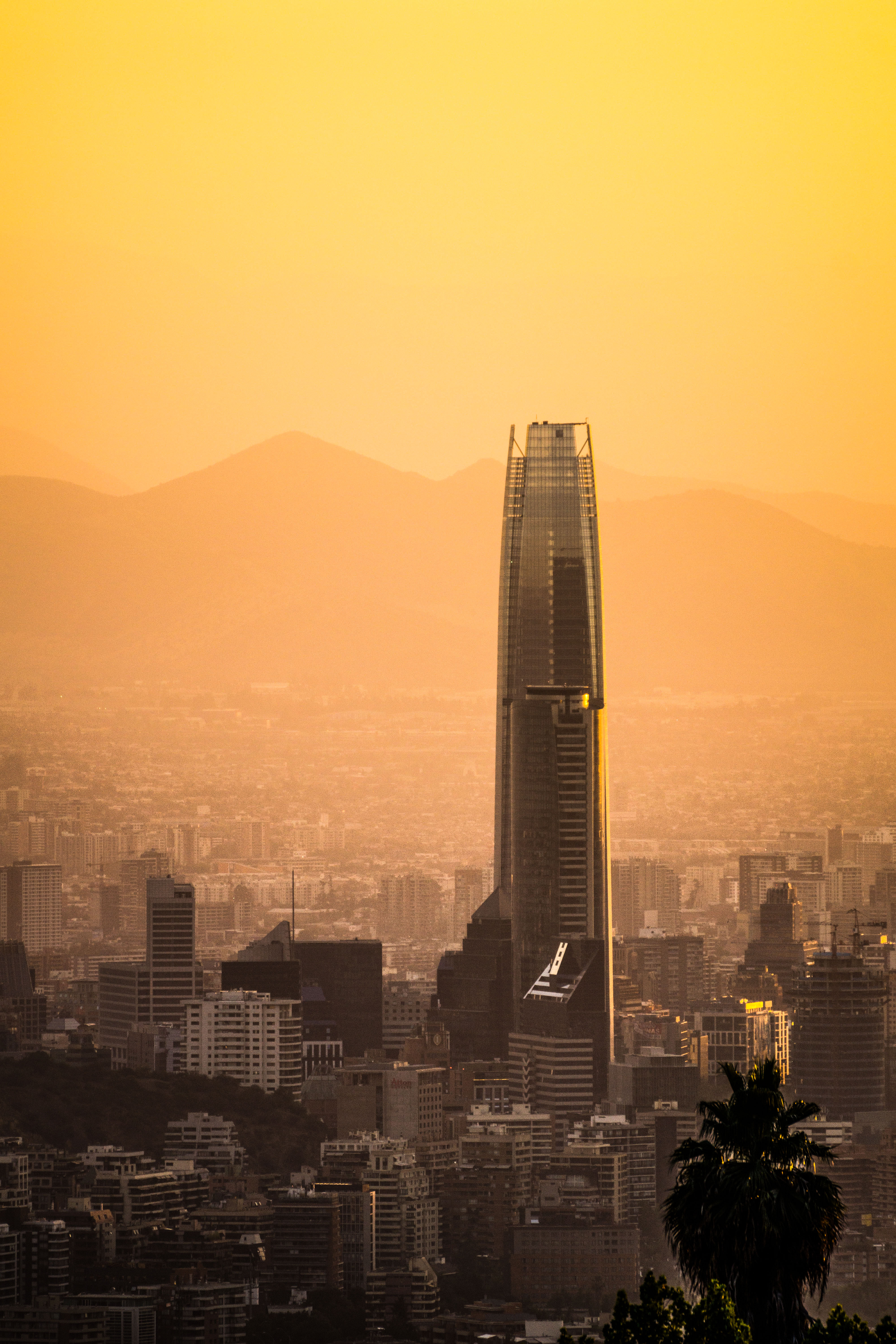
December 2013

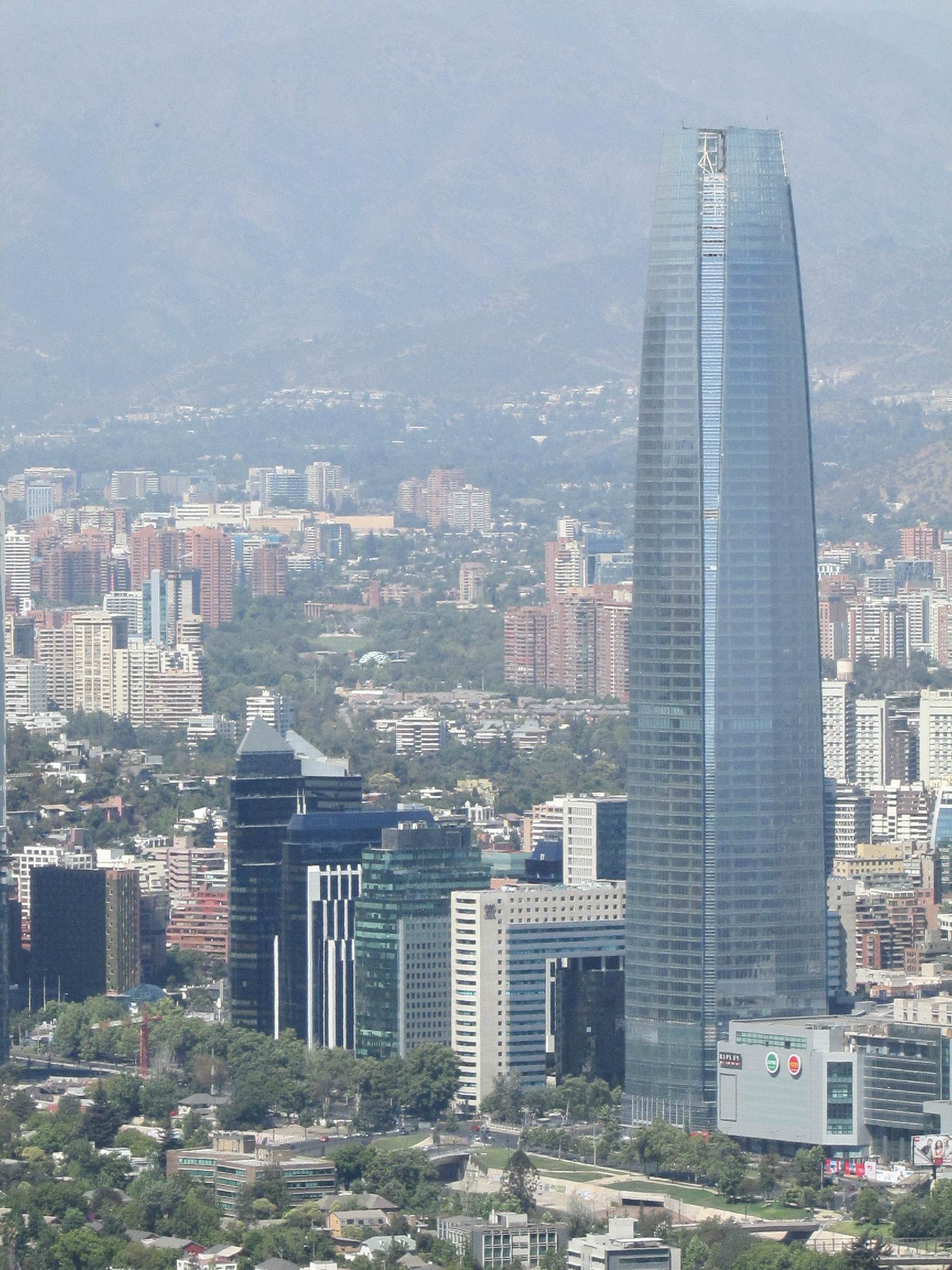
January 2014

== See also ==
- List of tallest buildings in Chile
- List of tallest buildings in South America
- List of tallest buildings in Latin America

Records
Preceded by Titanium La Portada	Tallest building in Chile; 2012–present	Succeeded by Incumbent
