= Titanium La Portada =

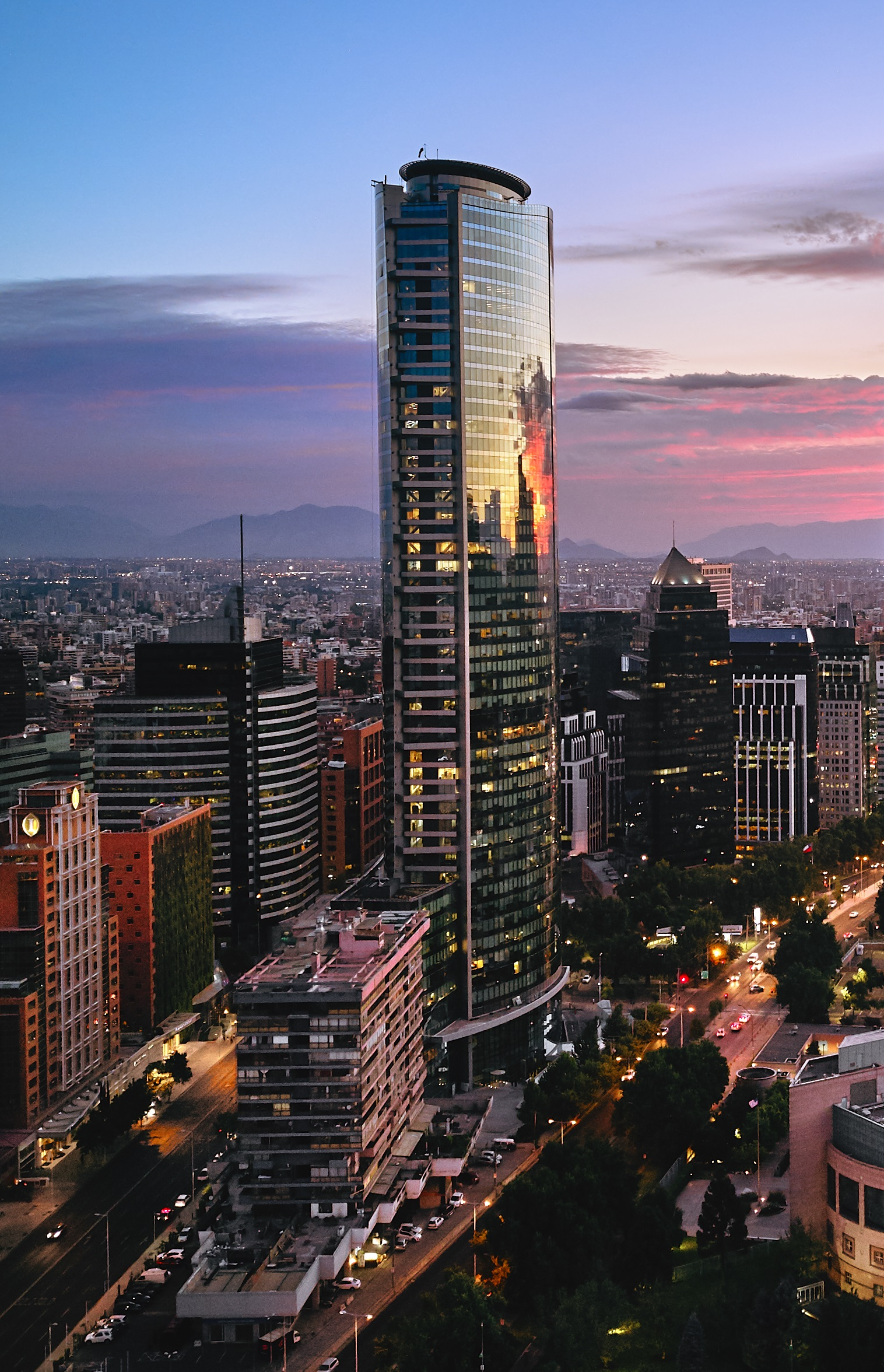
- Interactive map of the Titanium La Portada area

General information
- Status: Completed
- Location: Santiago, Chile
- Coordinates: 33°24′47.0″S 70°36′13.60″W
- Construction started: January 2007
- Estimated completion: January 2010
- Opening: 3 May 2010

Height
- Roof: 194.0 m (636 ft)

Technical details
- Floor count: 55

Design and construction
- Developer: Inmobiliaria Titanium S.A.

Titanium La Portada is an office building in Santiago, Chile. Located in the capital's high-end financial district of El Golf, it is the second tallest skyscraper in the country. Construction began in January 2007, and was completed in January 2010. It was surpassed in height by the then unfinished Gran Torre Santiago in November 2010. It was officially inaugurated on May 3, 2010. The architects are Abraham Senerman and Andrés Weil.

== Form ==
Titanium La Portada has a height of 205.0 metres (672.6 ft) at the roof and 55 above ground floors, plus another 7 underground floors. The seven underground floors are used primarily for parking. There are 20 high speed elevators to service the building, which move at a speed of 6.6 metres per second (22 ft/s). It has a total floorspace of 129,500 square metres (1,394,000 sq ft) for mixed office use. There are two helipads on top of the building. By 2010, Titanium La Portada is expected to be the 13th tallest building in Latin America.

== Other details ==
Construction began in January 2007 with an investment of US$120 million, and its inauguration was expected in December 2008. Primary materials used include aluminum, reinforced concrete, steel, granite and glass curtain wall. Because Santiago is prone to earthquakes, the building was anchored 50 metres (160 ft) deep with 65 concrete and steel pylons, allowing it to withstand an earthquake of 9.0 on the Richter scale. The tower did not suffer any damage from the earthquake in February 2010, although one of the decorative fixtures in the exterior did collapse.

The space occupied by the building was formerly an upscale shopping mall, the Portada de Vitacura. So as to integrate well with the surrounding area, 70% of the ground level will be open to pedestrians, and much will be green space and recreational.

Titanium La Portada is the first project in South America to be certified green in the LEED rating system by the US Green Building Council.

== See also ==
- List of tallest buildings in South America
- Costanera Center

Records
Preceded by Torre Telefónica Chile	Tallest building in Chile; 2010–2012	Succeeded by Gran Torre Costanera
