= Centro Internacional de Bogotá =

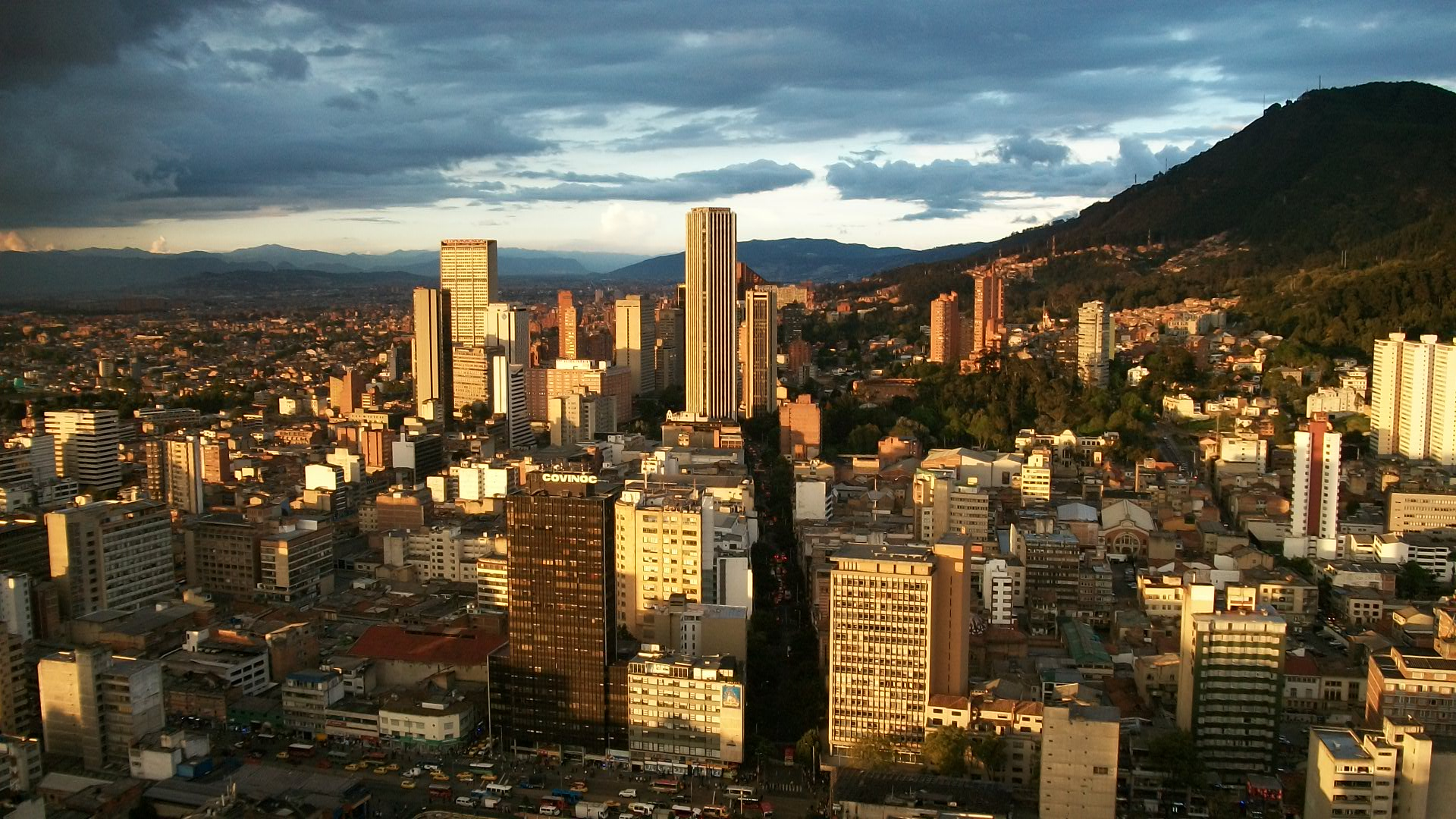
View of the CIB from the Avianca Building.

The Centro Internacional de Bogotá (CIB) is a sector of the center of Bogotá, the capital of Colombia, where several of the tallest buildings in the city and the country in general are located, mainly for offices, adjacent to multiple squares and pedestrian areas. It is located between 26th and 39th streets and Carrera Séptima and Avenida Caracas, in the San Diego and San Martín neighborhoods. Over time, it constituted the first financial sector of the city. It is located in the Centro Expandido de Bogotá and inside it is the Centro de Comercio Internacional.

== History ==
During the colonial period, the CIB was occupied by crops and farms, although it was important since one of the exits from the city was located there, the Tunja road. The Iglesia de San Diego dates from this period.

During the Republican era (late 19th century and early 20th century) the area where the CIB is currently located was a residential and industrial sector with few commercial establishments, located on the then outskirts of the city. The old Bavaria Brewery was located in this area, which is currently a park. This sector was notably devastated during the Bogotazo, since many properties were destroyed, generating vacant lots that were not occupied for several years.

As a result of this, the families that lived in the area emigrated to new neighborhoods created further north, with which the CIB declined, especially during the 1950s. The key factors for the beginning of the transformation of the sector were the construction of the Tequendama Crowne Plaza Hotel, formerly (Intercontinental Tequendama Hotel) and later of the Centro Internacional Tequendama (a complex of office buildings adjacent to the hotel), as well as the construction of the El Dorado International Airport, since when Avenida El Dorado was remodeled, which connects the city with the airport, turned the CIB into a magnet for business. In addition, with the expansion of the city, little by little the sector was included in the center of it.

Around the 1960s and 1970s, several buildings taller than 20 stories were being built in the sector. With which the larger-scale commercial activities ceased to be concentrated in the Avenida Jiménez sector, which has historically been the center of Bogotá. In 1972, the Hilton Hotel was established in Carrera Séptima with Calle 33, which operated until 1991.
