= National Zoo =

National Zoo, National Zoological Garden, or National Zoological Park may refer to:

- Chilean National Zoo, Santiago, Chile
- National Zoo & Aquarium, Canberra, Australia
- National Zoo (Malaysia), Kuala Lumpur, Malaysia
- National Zoological Gardens (Sri Lanka), Dehiwala, Sri Lanka
- National Zoological Gardens of South Africa, Pretoria, South Africa
- National Zoological Park (India), Delhi, India
- National Zoological Park (United States), Washington D.C., United States
- Scottish National Zoological Park (usually called the Edinburgh Zoo), Edinburgh, Scotland
