= Barrio Bellavista =

Coordinates: 33°25′58″S 70°38′09″W

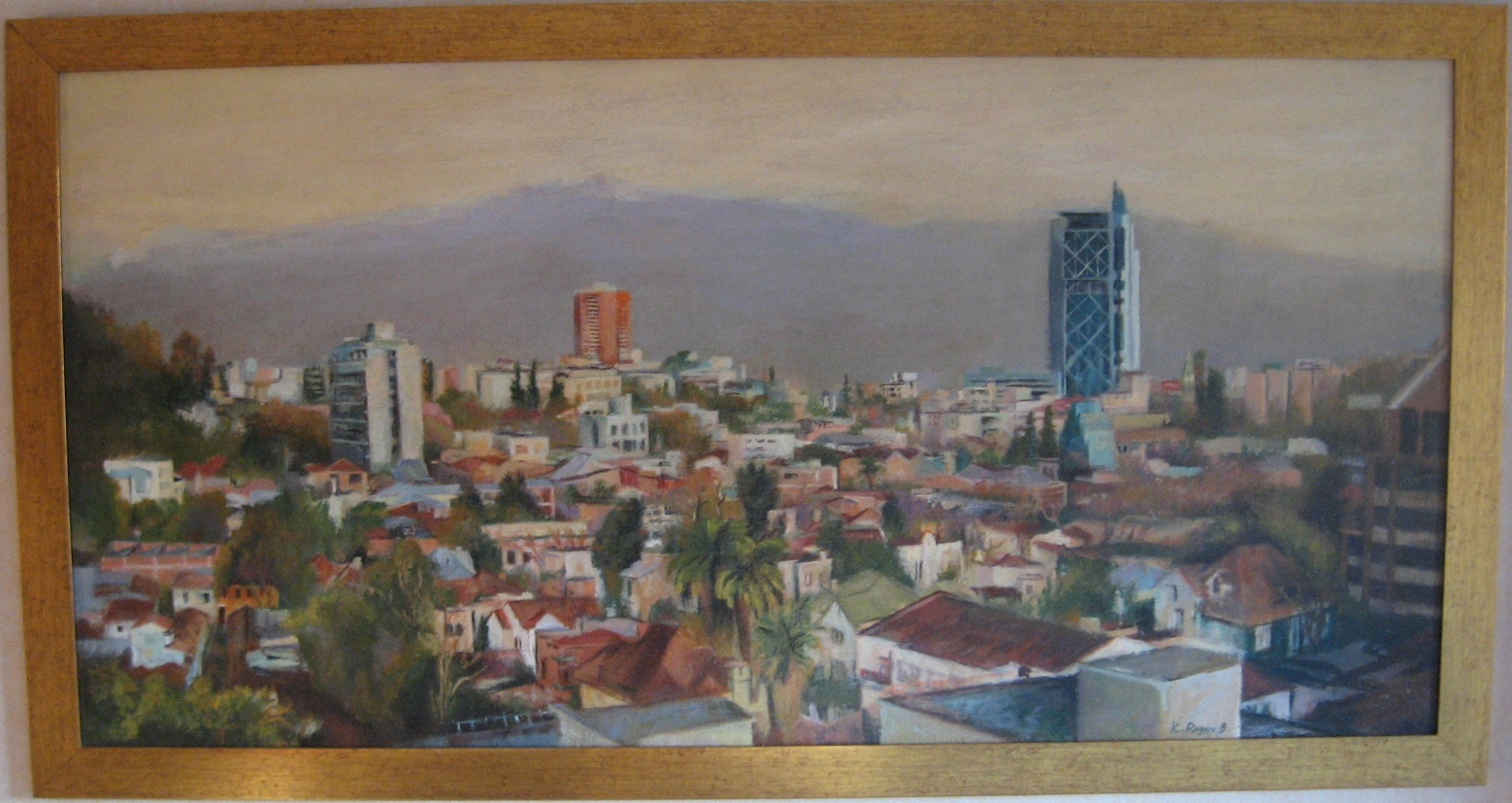
A painting of the skyline of Bellavista

Barrio Bellavista (Bellavista Neighborhood) is a neighborhood dating from 1900, which lies between the Mapocho River and San Cristóbal Hill in Santiago, Chile, in the communes of Providencia and Recoleta. It is known as Santiago's bohemian quarter, with numerous restaurants, boutiques, avant-garde galleries, bars and clubs. Many of the city's intellectuals and artists live in Bellavista, and Pablo Neruda's house in Santiago, La Chascona, is in the district. The area is served by the Baquedano Metro subway station, located across the river to the south.

Bellavista is a popular place to purchase craftwork made from lapis lazuli, a semiprecious stone found principally in Chile and Afghanistan. On weekends, there is an evening handicrafts market which runs the length of calle Pío Nono. Another attraction is the Santa Filomena Parish also known as the Parroquia de Santa Filomena. The National Zoo of Chile is located at the entrance of San Cristóbal Hill.
