= Funicular de Santiago =

National monument of Chile

Coordinates: 33°25′48″S 70°38′09″W

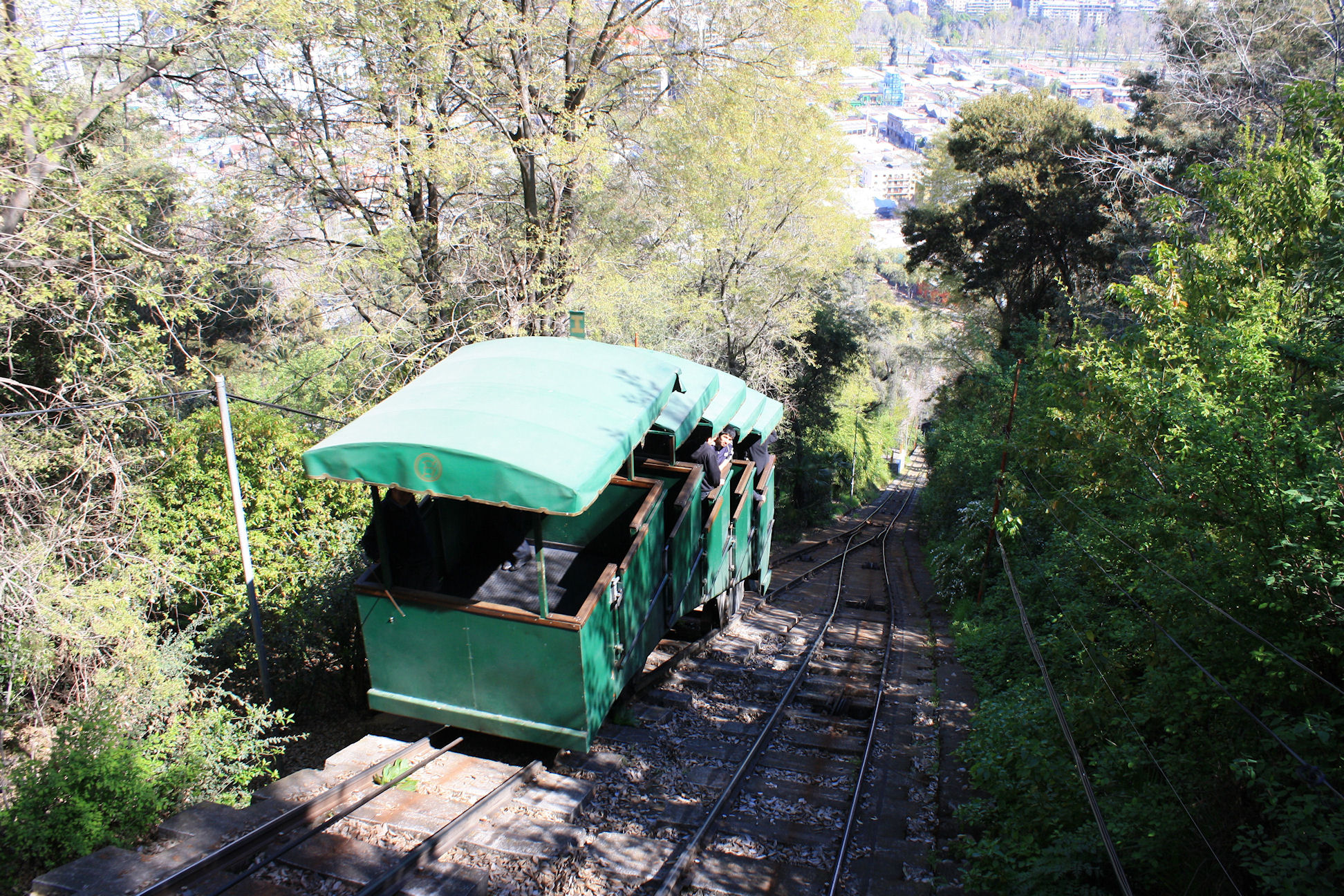

Overview
- Locale: San Cristóbal Hill, Santiago, Chile
- Number of lines: 1
- Number of stations: 3
- Website: https://funicularsantiago.cl/

Technical
- System length: 485 metres

The Funicular de Santiago is a funicular railway on a slope of the San Cristóbal Hill, in the city of Santiago de Chile. It forms part of the tourist attractions of the Santiago Metropolitan Park.

== History ==
The idea of a funicular originated when the Cerro San Cristóbal began to be taken for public use in the 1910s, project that was finally commissioned to the Italian engineer Ernesto Bosso in 1922. The foundation stone of the funicular was laid on 24 November 1923, and its construction was completed and inaugurated on 25 April 1925 (101 years ago) by the then President of Chile Arturo Alessandri. The station located at the feet of the hill was designed by architect Luciano Kulczewski, while the strength of steel wire ropes was tested by engineer Jorge Alessandri, who later went on to become president of Chile (1958–1964).

Between July 11 and August 11, 1949, the service was suspended for repairs and maintenance. From 10 to 13 and from 17 to 20 July 1950, the funicular was closed to undergo repair works. In those years full fares ranged between $3.6 and $7.4, and the student fare was $2.

In 1968, the original wooden car roofs were replaced with canvas tops supported by metal frames. Pope John Paul II traveled in the funicular of Santiago during his only visit to Chile in 1987. The funicular was declared as a National Monument of Chile on November 16, 2000.

In January 1998, the only serious accident occurred, when a car ascending to the Cumbre station —which carried six park employees— crashed against the hill due to a late brake activation. An employee lost his left arm and the front of the car involved was destroyed.

The funicular is 485 metres (1,591 ft) long and consists of three stations: "Pío Nono" (at the base of the hill), "Zoo" and "Cumbre", where the Santuario a la Virgen is located and where there is a connection with the Santiago Cable Car.

== Gallery ==
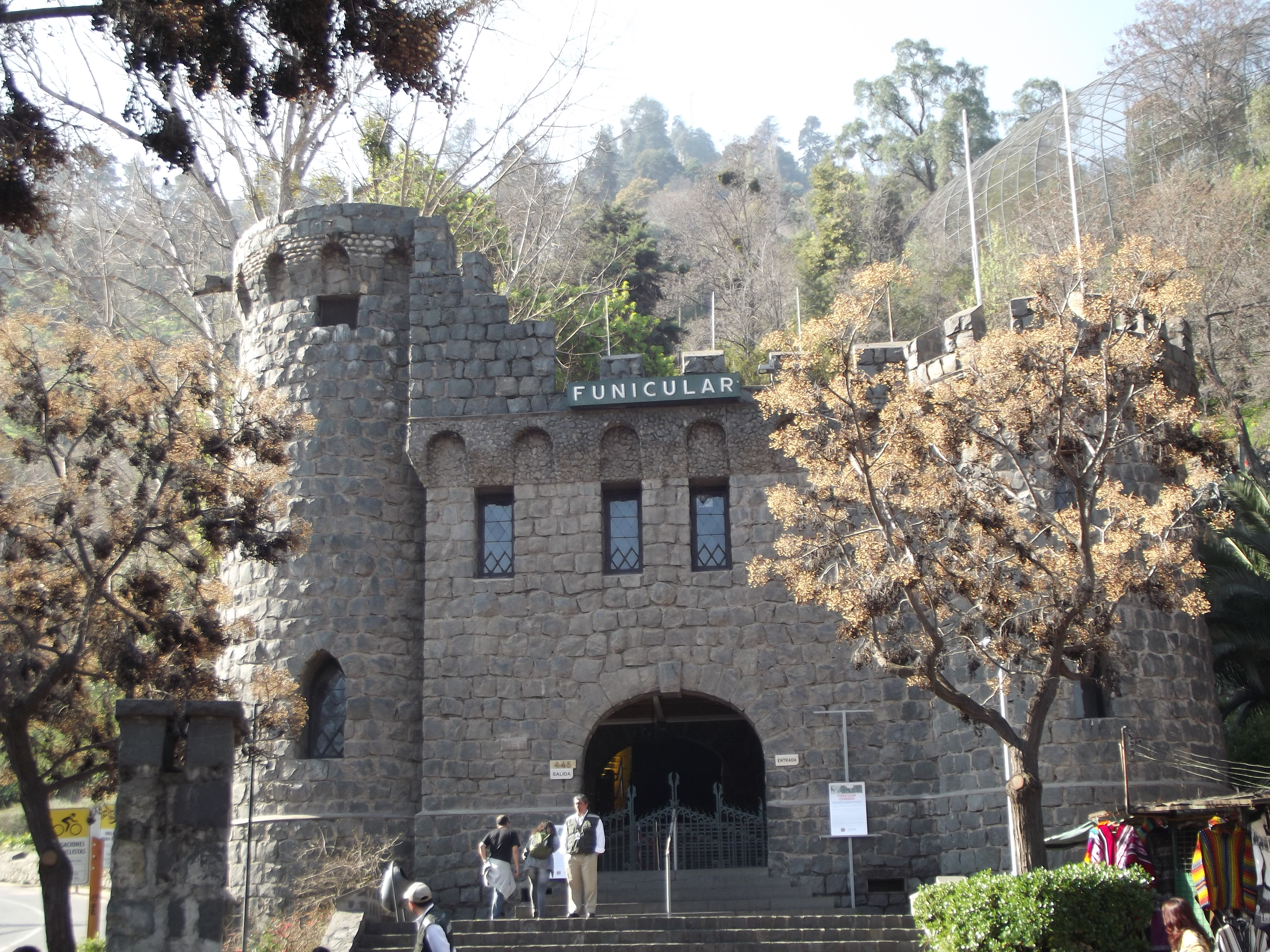
Main entrance

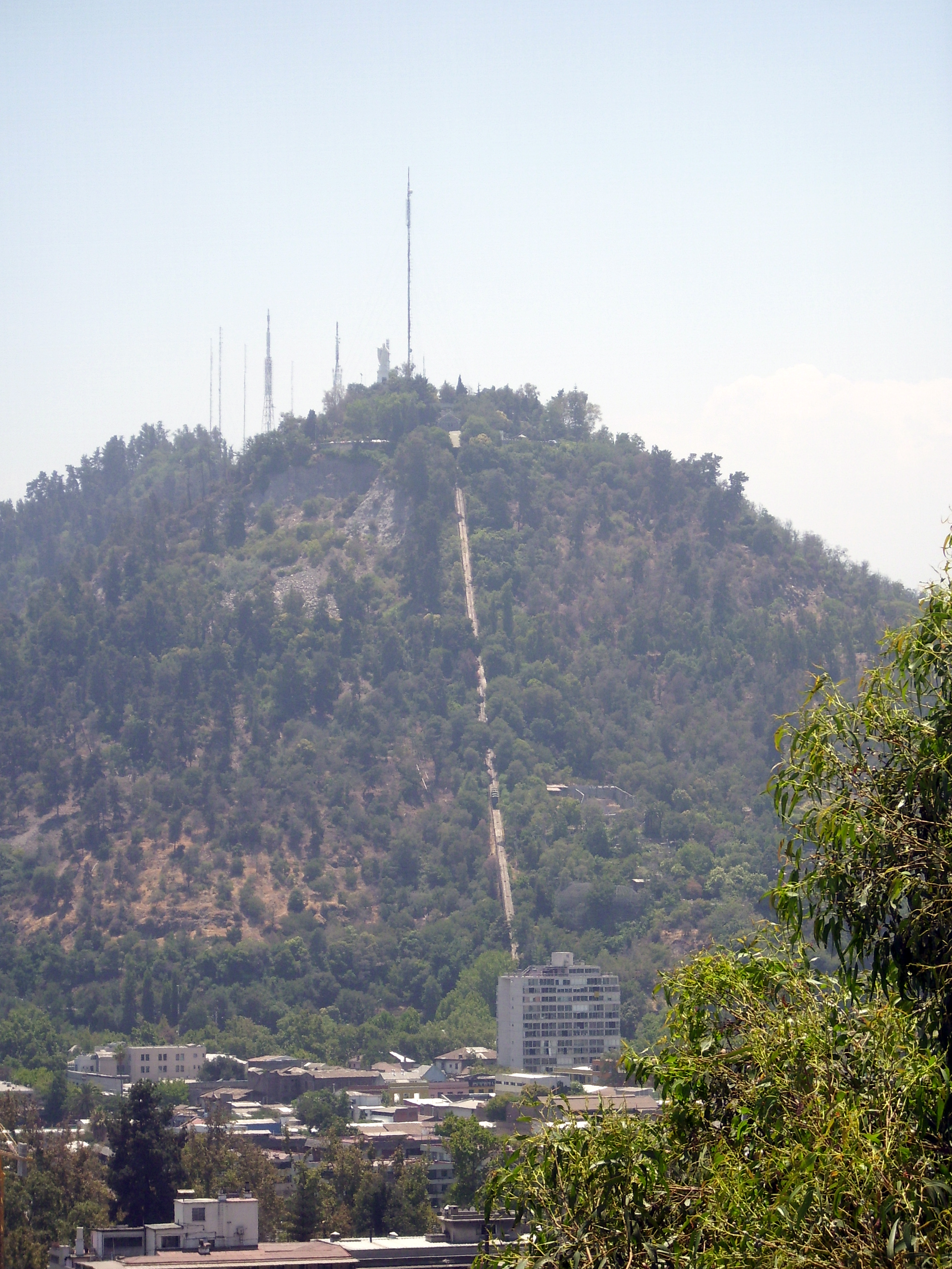
Seen from the Santa Lucía Hill

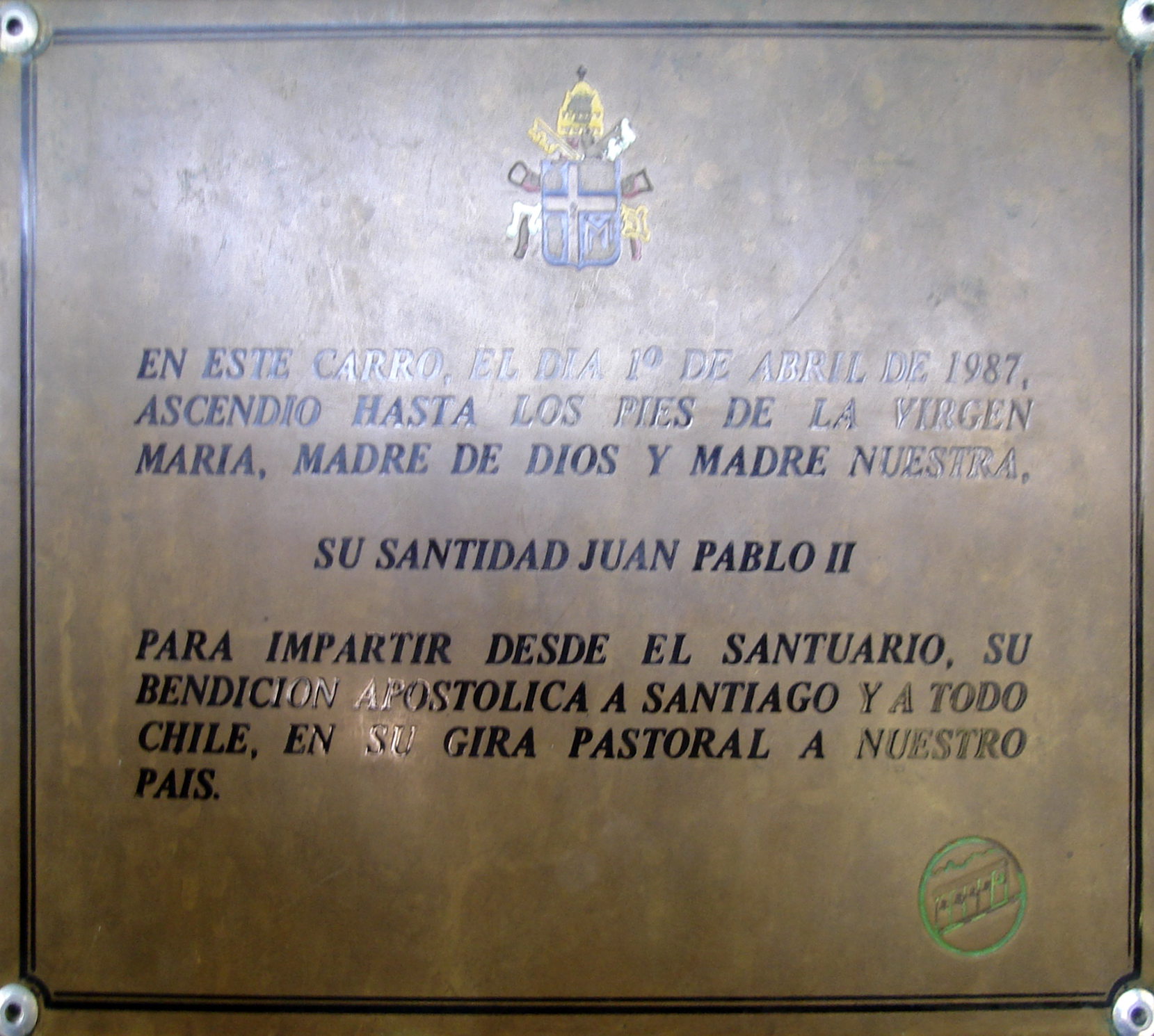
Plaque

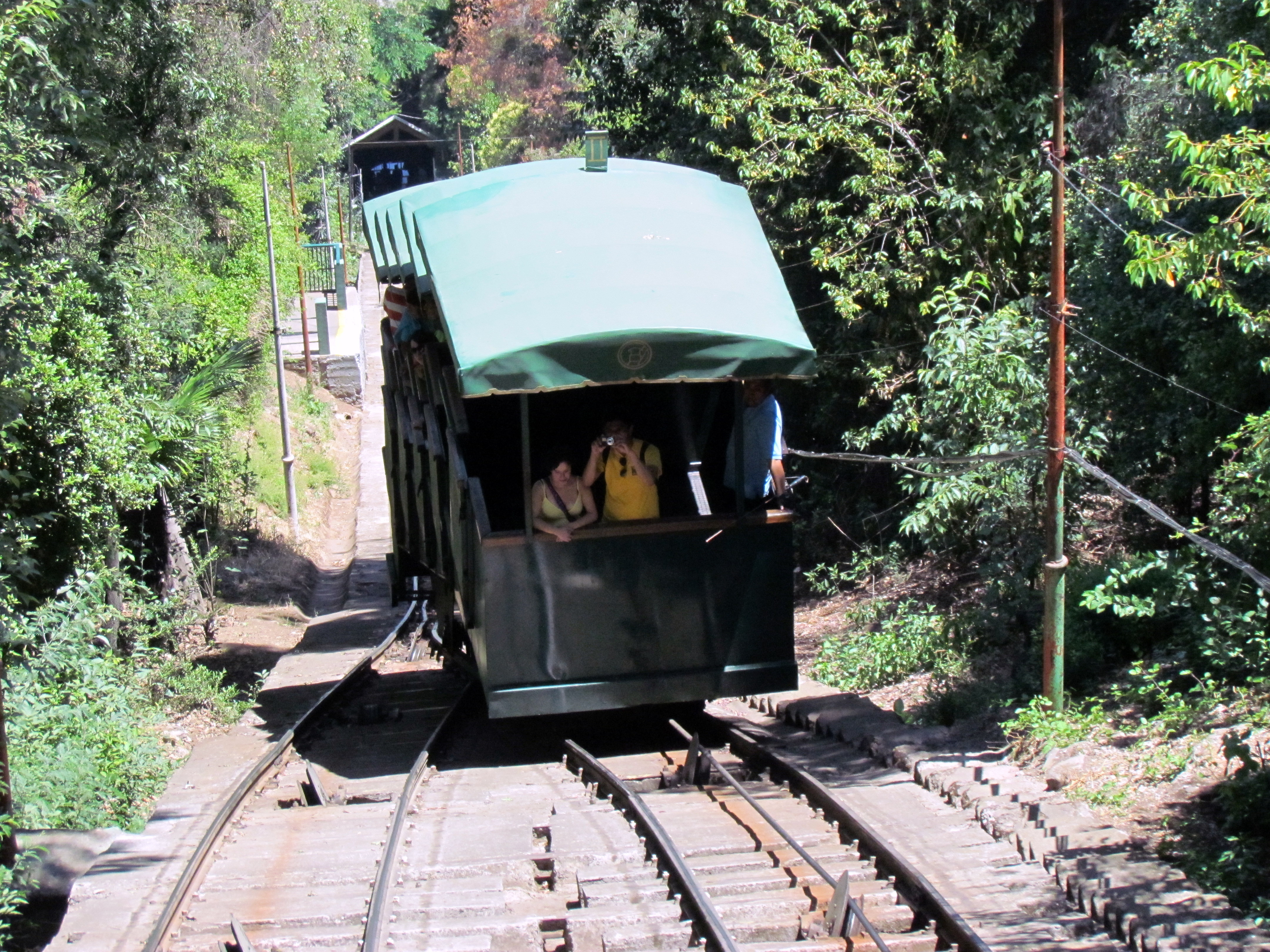
Funicular cars

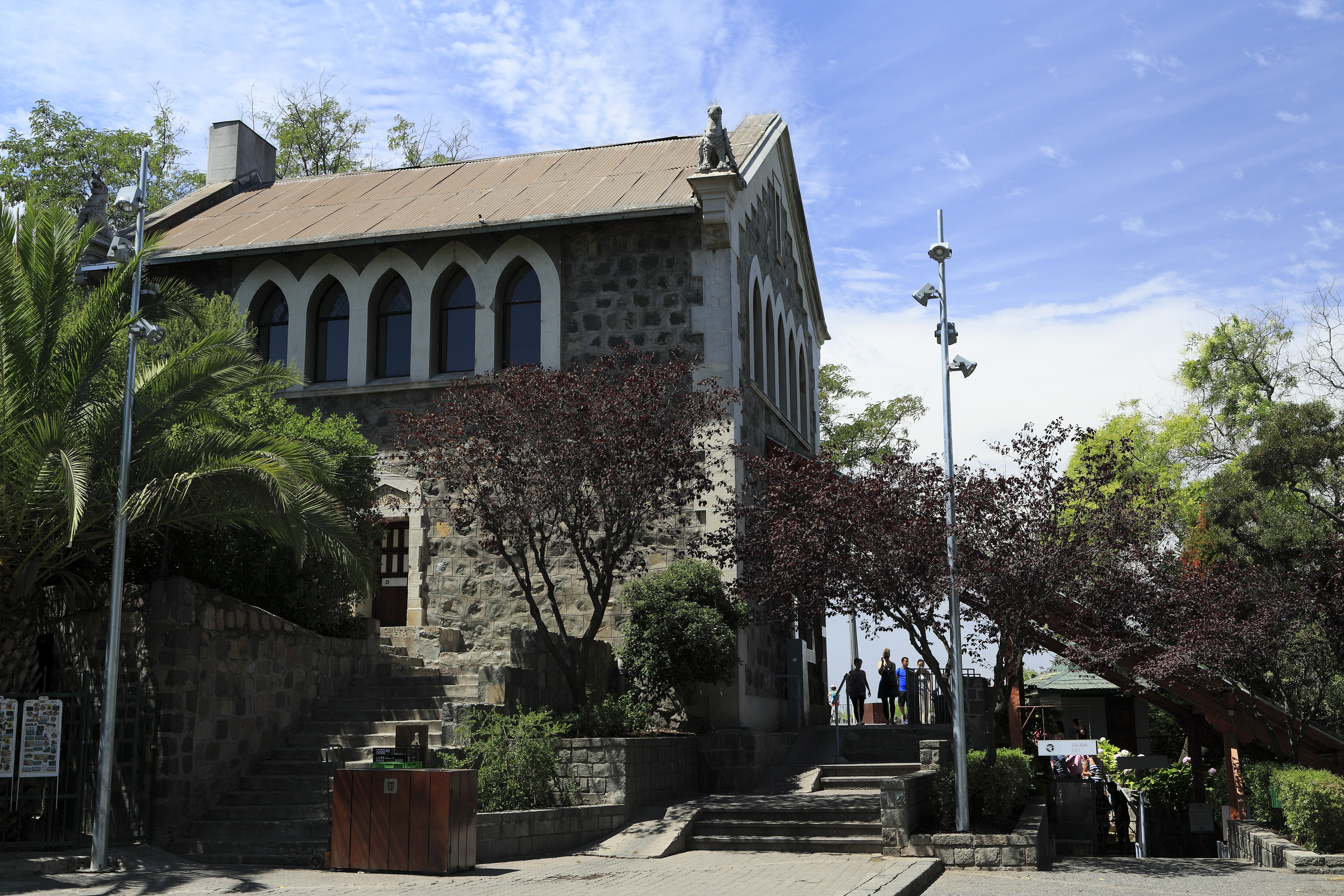
Engine room at the Cumbre station.
