= Cycling at the 2017 South American Youth Games =

- Venue: Peñalolén Park (BMX); Santiago Metropolitan Park (Mountain); Santiago (Road); Peñalolén Velodrome (Track)
- Dates: 30 September–8 October 2017
- Competitors: 90 from 9 nations

The cycling competitions of the 2017 South American Youth Games in Santiago were held at four venues scheduled to host sixteen events between 30 September and 8 October.

== Venues ==
Venue	Sport	Date	Medal events
Santiago	Road cycling	1 and 8 October	4
Santiago Metropolitan Park	Mountain biking	30 September–1 October	4
Peñalolén Park	BMX	7 October	2
Peñalolén Velodrome	Track cycling	3–5 October	6

== Participation ==
=== Participating nations ===
- Argentina
- Brazil
- Chile
- Colombia
- Ecuador
- Paraguay
- Peru
- Uruguay
- Venezuela

== Medal table ==
Rank	Nation	Gold	Silver	Bronze	Total
1	Colombia (COL)	7	7	4	18
2	Chile (CHI)	5	5	4	14
3	Argentina (ARG)	3	0	2	5
4	Venezuela (VEN)	1	1	1	3
5	Ecuador (ECU)	0	2	1	3
6	Brazil (BRA)	0	1	4	5
Totals (6 entries)		16	16	16	48

== Road cycling ==
Event	Gold	Silver	Bronze
Men's road race	Yoel Vargas; Argentina	Francisco Penuela Sandoval; Venezuela	Gustavo de Oliveira Pereira; Brazil
Women's road race	Aiyelen Leal Rain; Chile	Paulina Vejar Erices; Chile	Maria Daza Santana; Venezuela
Men's time trial	Hector Quintana Vidal; Chile	Miguel Hoyos; Colombia	Rodrigo Corro; Argentina
Women's time trial	Daniela Munoz; Argentina	María Atahualpa; Colombia	Amanda Kunkel; Brazil

== Track cycling ==
=== Men's ===
Event	Gold	Silver	Bronze
2000 m individual pursuit	Miguel Hoyos; Colombia	Hector Quintana; Chile	Andres Pardo; Colombia
Omnium	Miguel Hoyos; Colombia	Jacob Decar; Chile	Rodrigo Corro; Argentina
Team sprint	Argentina (ARG); Alan Celentano Isturiz; Rodrigo Corro; Yoel Vargas	Chile (CHI); Jacob Decar; Tomas Quiroz Martinez	Brazil (BRA); Artur Guarda Simeoni; Pedro Pereira Pussieldi; Vinicius Guimarães da Cruz

=== Women's ===
Event	Gold	Silver	Bronze
2000 m individual pursuit	Catalina Soto; Chile	Amanda Kunkel; Brazil	María Atahualpa; Colombia
Omnium	Catalina Soto; Chile	María Atahualpa; Colombia	Elizabeth Castaño; Colombia
Team sprint	Venezuela (VEN); Luisymar Garrido Pereira; Nazaret Gutierrez Flores	Chile (CHI); Aiyelen Leal Rain; Lourdes Alfaro Lou	Colombia (COL); Estefani Rodríguez; Laura Velásquez

== Mountain biking ==
Event	Gold	Silver	Bronze
Men's cross-country	Jeronimo Bedoya; Colombia	Romulo Moscoso Roman; Ecuador	Gustavo de Oliveira Pereira; Brazil
Women's cross-country	Ana Villegas; Colombia	Isabella Alban; Colombia	Catalina Vidaurre; Chile
Men's eliminator	Jeronimo Bedoya; Colombia	Brayan Zubieta; Colombia	Tomas Caulier Marinovic; Chile
Women's eliminator	Catalina Vidaurre; Chile	Ana Villegas; Colombia	Yarela Gonzalez Obando; Chile

== BMX racing ==
Event	Gold	Silver	Bronze
Men	Juan Ramírez; Colombia	Samuel Zapata; Colombia	Gonzalo Rengel Lopez; Ecuador
Women	Ana Cadavid; Colombia	Romina Miranda Urgilez; Ecuador	Martina Timis Briones; Chile
