= Sanctuary on San Cristóbal Hill =

Catholic church in Santiago, Chile

Coordinates: 33.4253°S 70.6332°W

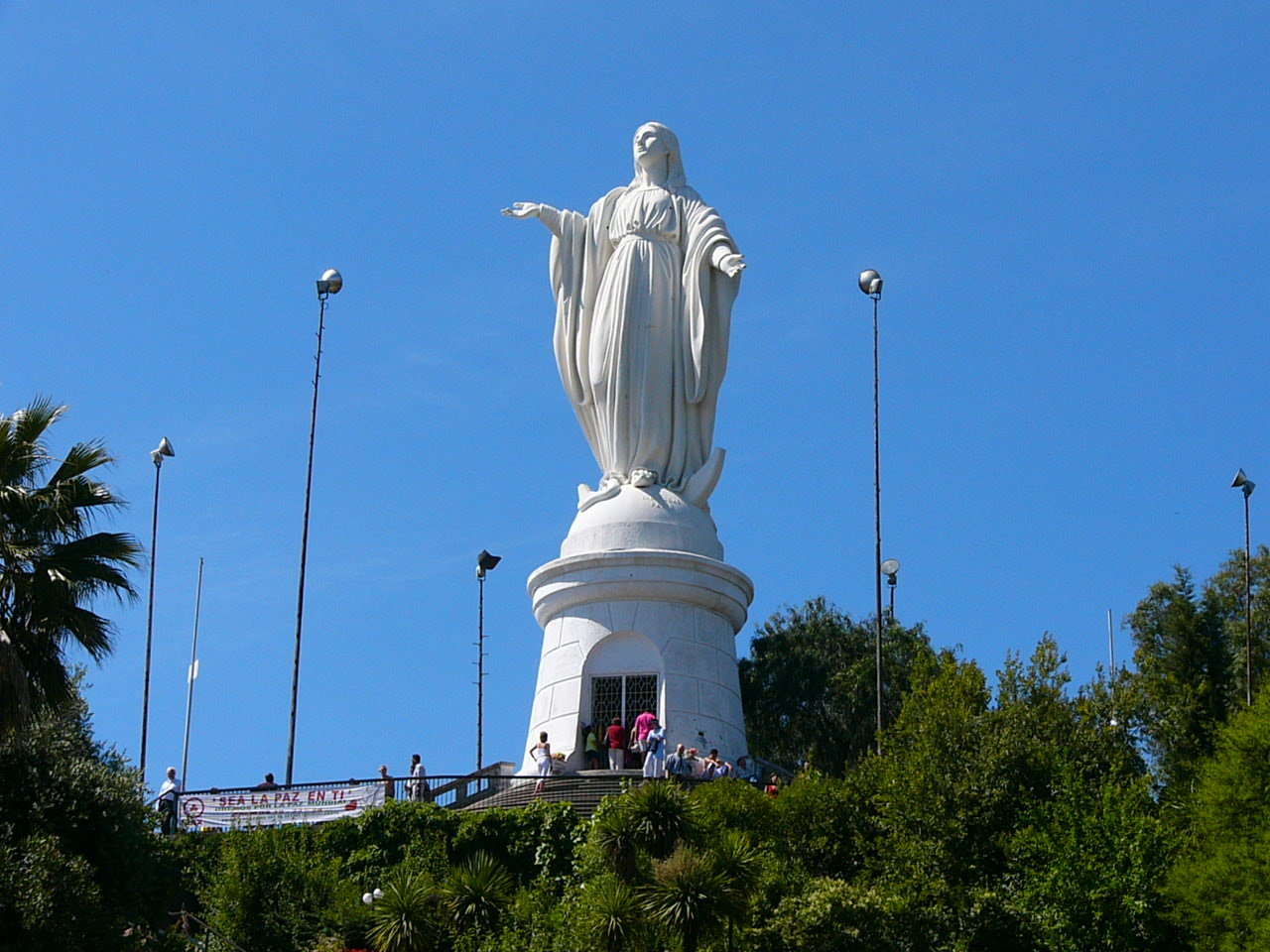
Statue of the Virgin Mary on the top of Cerro San Cristóbal

The Sanctuary of the Immaculate Conception on San Cristóbal Hill is one of the principal places of worship for the Catholic Church of Chile, as well as being an icon of Santiago, Chile. It is notable in particular for a large statue of the Immaculate Conception, which is located at the summit of San Cristóbal Hill, some 863 meters above sea level.

== Sanctuary and statue ==
The statue of the Immaculate Conception measures 14 meters tall, and the pedestal on which it rests, 8.3 meters. It weighs 36,610 kilograms. On the pedestal there is a small chapel in which John Paul II prayed and blessed the city of Santiago on April 1, 1987. The statue is lit up at night by lights placed on its sides, allowing it to be viewed from all over Santiago both day and night.

At the foot of the statue there is an amphitheater for holding masses or other religious ceremonies. Near the statue, there is also a small chapel for praying. The statue can be reached via the road joining the Santiago Metropolitan Park, via the Funicular de Santiago or the Santiago Cable Car, which has its final station next to the sanctuary.

The statue is currently in good condition, and was given a thorough clean and repaint in early 2012.

== History ==
Before the arrival of the Spanish forces in Chile, the place where the shrine now stands was venerated by the indigenous population and known as Tupahue, meaning "Place of God" in Mapundungun. Some time after the founding of Santiago, a 10-meter cross was placed on the hill's summit, where it remained until the end of the 19th century. Popes Leo XIII and Pius X both proclaimed that during 1904, the 50th anniversary of the dogma of the Immaculate Conception would be celebrated. Answering this call to commemoration, the Archbishop of Santiago, Monsignor Mariano Casanova, asked the priest José Alejo Infante to coordinate a meeting of clergymen and lay people. It was at this meeting that Infante proposed and received approval for the construction of a Marian shrine.

The statue is believed to be a reproduction of the "Virgin of Rome" and was designed by Luigi Poletti and is a work by Giuseppe Obici. The French foundry Val D'Osne was commissioned to construct the statue by then Chilean ambassador to France, Enrique Salvador Sanfuentes. The statue cost 22,000 francs at the time.

The land on which the sanctuary was built was donated by the communities of the Recoleta Dominica church and the Saint Teresa Carmelites of Santiago. The first stone was placed on December 8, 1904, and the shrine was officially inaugurated on April 26, 1908. In 1987 it was visited by Pope John Paul II.

== See also ==
- Roman Catholic Archdiocese of Santiago de Chile
