= Manuel Foster Observatory =

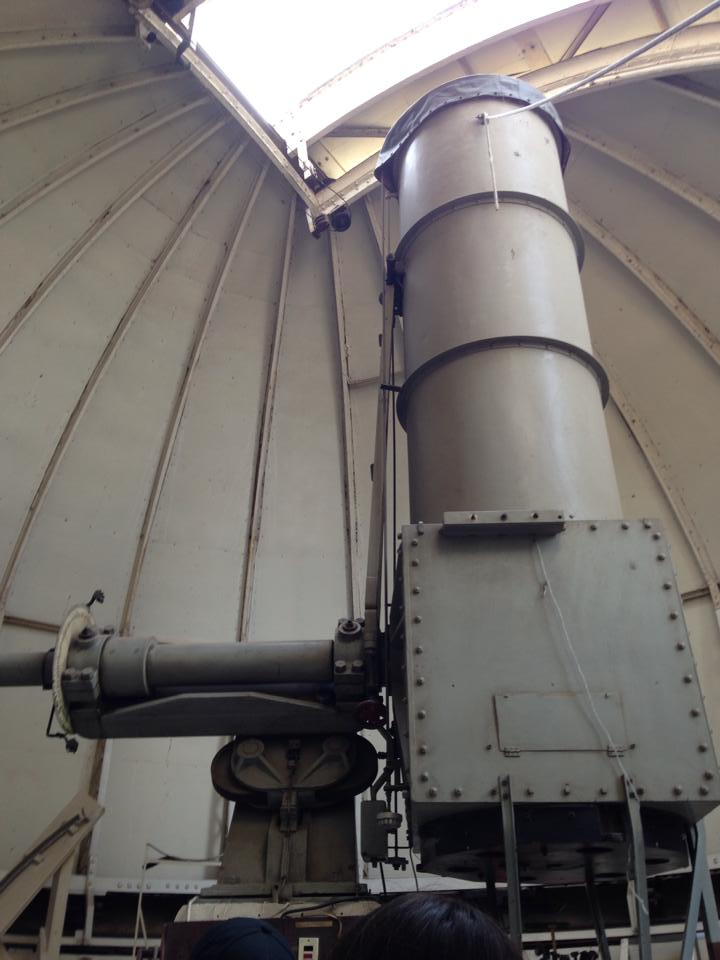
- Mills telescope inside the observatory dome
- Alternative names: Observatorio Manuel Foster
- Location: San Cristóbal Hill, Santiago, Santiago Metropolitan Region, Chile
- Coordinates: 33°25′20″S 70°37′57″W
- Altitude: 850 m (2,790 ft)
- Established: 1903
- Website: astro.uc.cl/en/divulgacion-2/foster-observatory

Telescopes
- Mills Telescope: 0.93 m reflector
- Related media on Commons

The Observatorio Manuel Foster, or Manuel Foster Observatory, is an astronomical observatory constructed on Cerro San Cristóbal, a hill near Santiago, Chile in 1903. This site was originally known as the D. O. Mills Observatory after the philanthropist Darius Ogden Mills. It was built as an offshoot of the Lick Observatory to observe stars in the southern hemisphere, and, under the direction of the American astronomer W. W. Campbell, was used in an extensive project to determine the apex of the Sun's motion through space.

The initial funding for the project financed operations for a two year period. Because Campbell had been seriously injured, the expedition was headed up by his assistant, William H. Wright. After setting up the telescope and the observation dome, the instrument quality was found to be satisfactory and operations began late in 1903. A total of 800 spectrograms had been successfully collected by October 1905. Heber D. Curtis took over operations in March 1906, and new financing from Mills allowed improvements to the observatory. Using the data collected from this observatory, Campbell completed his study on the motion of the Sun in 1926. With added funding, operations continued at the observatory until 1928, when it was purchased by Chilean lawyer Manuel Foster Recabarren for the Universidad Católica de Chile and transferred to their control.

The observatory is located in the Santiago Metropolitan Park and became a national monument in 2010. The main telescope is a cassegrain reflector with a 0.93 m (3.1 ft) aperture and an equatorial mount. This instrument is housed inside a rotating dome.

== History ==
In 1897, the astronomer William Wallace Campbell, assisted by William H. Wright, began a program of measuring the radial velocity of all stars in the northern hemisphere having an apparent visual magnitude of 5.51 or brighter. This task was facilitated by the newly installed Mills spectrograph, which was attached to the 91 cm (36 in) telescope at the Lick Observatory. This instrument was specifically designed for photographing stellar spectra, and was made possible by a grant from the banker Darius O. Mills. It saw first use in May 1895 and proved highly successful, improving accuracy by an order of magnitude over previous instruments. The design included three prisms and an iron arc comparison system. However, there were flexure and light loss issues that limited its capabilities. By 1903, an improved design allowed measurements of stars at fainter magnitudes.

In 1894 Campbell first recognized the need for similar radial velocity measurements of stars in the Southern Hemisphere. This would allow a more complete investigation of the Solar System's motion with respect to the neighboring stars. The director of the Lick observatory, James Edward Keeler, died on August 12, 1900, and Campbell was named to succeed him as of January 1, 1901. When Campbell brought the need for a southern observatory to the attention of D. O. Mills, the banker agreed to finance this expedition. In sum, an amount of $26,075 would be provided, to cover the cost of instruments, building construction, salaries, travel expenses, and supplies for this two year expedition. This is equivalent to $1,009,103 in 2025. The plan was for the completed observatory to be a much less costly duplicate of the spectroscopic capabilities of the instruments used for the northern survey. The resulting cost was one eighteenth the cost of the Lick observatory main telescope. For the observatory location, Campbell initially considered possible sites in Australia. However, climate records and the reports from other astronomers indicated that Chile would be a better site. He finally settled on placing it in the vicinity of the Chilean capital of Santiago, so that supplies and living quarters would be readily available.

The Lick observatory had a spare 92 cm (36.25 in) silvered parabolic glass mirror in its possession, but the shape was imperfect. After deciding on a Cassegrain-style reflecting telescope, during the spring of 1901 the mirror was shipped to the John A. Brashear Company in Allegheny for refiguring. However, the mirror broke while the central hole was being cut, so a new mirror had to be ordered. The mount was constructed by the Fulton Engine Works in Los Angeles, and it arrived at the observatory in December 1901. A rotating steel dome for the observatory was constructed by Warner and Swasey Company, and the spectroscope and other optics by Brashear. When the mirror arrived in 1902, it was found to be again shaped to the wrong figure and had to be returned for correction. With the schedule delayed, it was resolved that the instruments would be shipped to their final destination without testing the completed instrument. The finished mirrors arrived in February 1903, and, as a result, the expedition reached Chile in April at the start of the southern rainy season.

=== Establishment and early operations ===
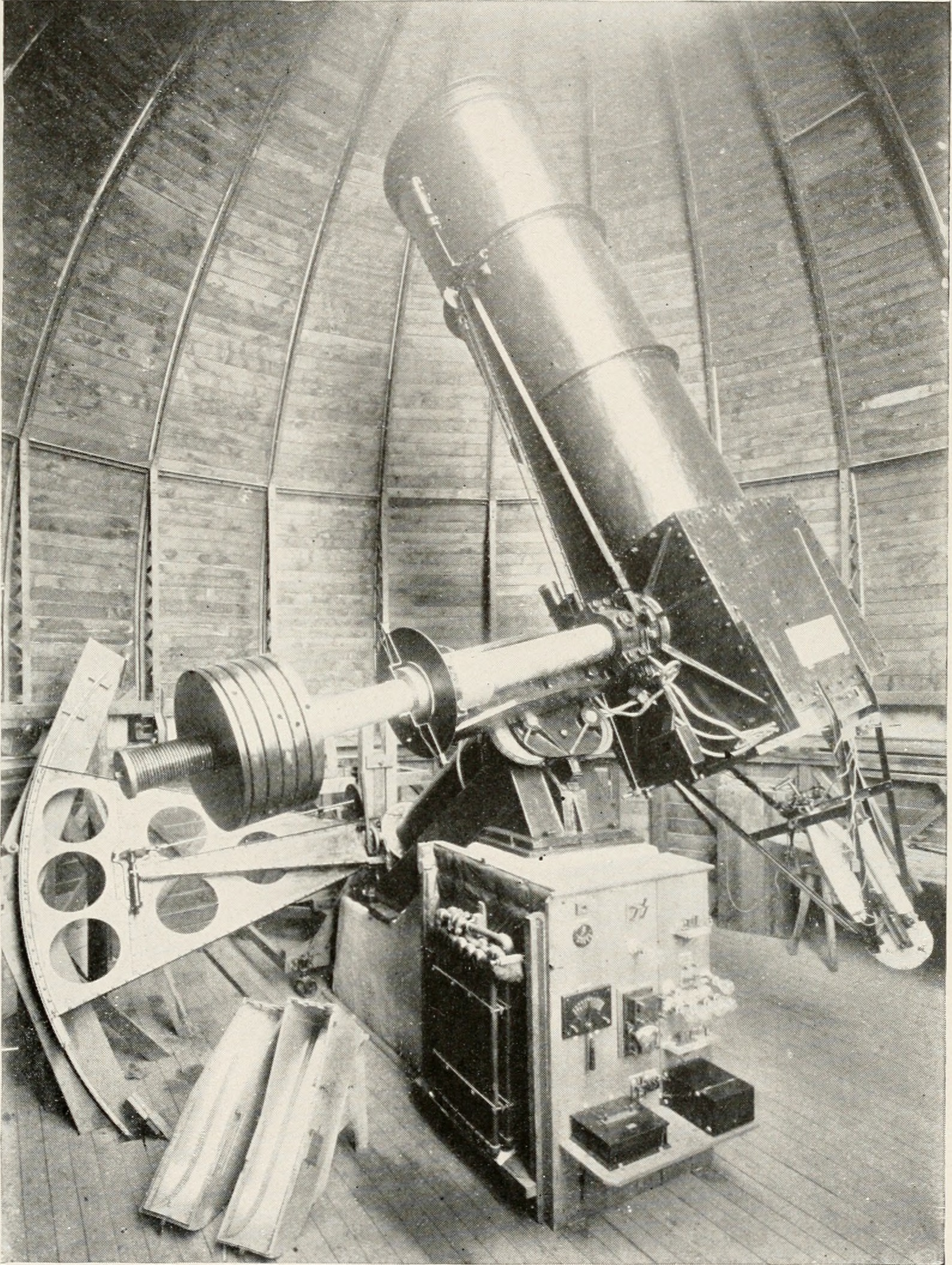
The 37-inch Mills Reflector, 1919

W. W. Campbell had intended to travel with the expedition, but he was severely injured while testing the equipment. Instead, the expedition was headed up by Campbell's associate, William H. Wright, with Harold K. Palmer as his assistant. They set sail from San Francisco on February 28, 1903 in the Pacific Mail steamship Peru. After transferring to the steamship Columbia at Panama, they arrived at Valparaíso on April 18. After a month-long delay due to a riotous strike in the port, the gear was unloaded and then transported 193 kilometres (120 miles) to Santiago by rail. There they were greeted by members of the Chilean government, who had agreed to assist by prior arrangement.

After a search for a suitable site for the observatory, the middle rise of the Cerro San Cristóbal was settled upon as the best location for meeting Campbell's general requirements. This ridge is located in the northeastern suburbs of Santiago, with a height of around 262 metres (860 ft) above the city. This placed it above the dust and haze of the urban area, and free of the frequent fogs that occurred in the valley. Even better, the temperature range on the mount was found to be lower than below. Unfortunately the weather was unusually cloudy that year, limiting observation tests. Late in May the strike ended in Valparaíso, which allowed the observatory equipment to be shipped and construction begun.

Only minor damage had been done to the telescope in transit. However, the dome had arrived badly rusted and repairs were necessary. The ground for the observatory was broken on May 27. The dome consisted of a steel framework sheathed in wood and covered in heavy painted canvas, which did not prove watertight. The observers were housed down in the city, necessitating a nightly climb to the observatory. The initial testing of the main telescope commenced on September 11, 1903. Some zonal aberration was found, which decreased later in the night as the instrument cooled. However, this defect was not found to be significant for spectroscopic work of this type. The telescope was found to change focus as it cooled. The nature of the silvered mirror precluded its use on clear damp nights, which occurred frequently during the rainy season. The silver coating showed a rapid decline in reflectivity over time due to tarnish, which required longer exposure times to compensate. The operation of the spectrograph was found to be on the same order of accuracy as the instrument at Lick Observatory. 380 successful spectrograms had been collected at the station by June 1, 1904.

=== Extended funding ===
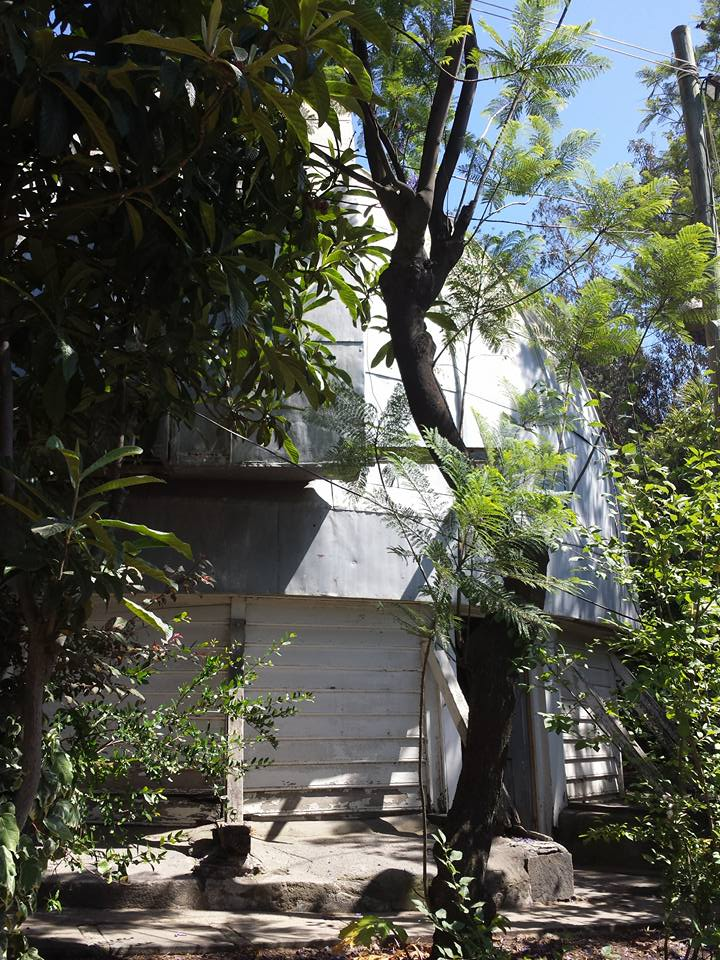
The observation dome, photographed in 2016

The funded observation program ended in October 1905. At this point, the spectra of the brighter stars south of declination –25° had been taken, producing a working list of 145 stars of which at least four photographic plates had been taken. The total number of specrograms was 800, with 676 of stars on the list and 92 that were found to be unmeasureable. The astronomers discovered 22 stars with variable radial velocities. Mills agreed to continue funding the station for an additional five years. To head up this new observation period, acting astronomer Heber D. Curtis set sail from San Francisco on December 30, 1905. The same month, Palmer returned to Lick observatory where he began measurements of the spectrogram plates. Curtis assumed command of the expedition on March 1, 1906, whereupon Wright returned to the United States. Curtis' assistant, George F. Paddock, arrived August 2, 1906.

The new financing was used to fund improvements to the observatory. The first change was the construction of an additional building to accommodate a machine shop, plus two rooms for the observers. New bearings were provided for the declination axis, which had proven difficult to move. Two new spectrograms were built for studying fainter stars, a refrigeration unit was provided for keeping the dome artificially chilled in the evening, and an apparatus was assembled for rapidly silvering the mirror. The first resilvering of the mirror occurred in March 1906. Following this, exposure times were reduced by 40%. However, the efficiency of the coat was back at its old level after a month. Wilson concluded it should be resilvered every two months for best results. The leaky canvas covering of the dome was replaced with galvanized iron early in 1906.

Data collection continued during the next three years, with around 200 nights per year being highly favorable for viewing. Most of the work was performed with the two-prism spectroscope, which had a lower limit of about magnitude 7.0. By late 1909, 2,700 photographic plates had been produced. 48 candidate spectroscopic binaries had been identified, along with several stars with high proper motion. During February and March, 1909, the telescope was used to observe Comet Morehouse. On June 5, Joseph H. Moore arrived at Santiago to take charge of the observatory. Curtis departed for California on June 17, and Paddock left in July, to be succeeded by Roscoe F. Sanford. By the start of December, a total of 725 stars, mostly below a declination of –20°, had spectrograms taken, measured, and the data collected. A total of 3,608 spectrographic plates had been made.

After D. O. Mills died in 1910, his son, Ogden Mills, agreed to fund the site until 1913. A sum totaling $30,000 was provided, covering expenses up through 1914. In addition to normal measurements, Campbell decided to use the additional time to make spectrographic measurements of nebulae in the southern hemisphere. These would supplement the previous measurement of 13 nebulae made by James E. Keeler in the northern hemisphere. Observations of 12 nebulae in the Greater Magellanic Cloud indicated that this formation was receding with a velocity of 250 to 300 km/s (160 to 190 mi/s), which suggested that it may be related to the spiral nebulae. After four years in charge, Moore returned to California in 1913, being replaced by Ralph E. Wilson as of August 1, the same year. Sanford remained behind for two more years, departing in June 1915.

Full funding by Ogden Mills ended in 1917, and the remaining period was financed by fourteen friends of the observatory, which included Mills. Wilson was assisted by math instructor Arthur A. Scott from the Instituto Ingles in Santiago, beginning in 1913 until he resigned June, 1917, then by Charles M. Huffer. During June 1918, Wilson resigned his position and returned to the United States, whereupon he was engaged in war service constructing aircraft in Dayton, Ohio for use by the United States in World War I. This left Huffer alone at the station, as Paddock was not given permission by the military authorities for that service. Huffer ran the station until October, 1919, when Paddock returned for five years. The observatory was renamed Chile Station of Lick Observatory in 1919. The final head of the observatory was Ferdinand J. Neubauer, who assumed control on January 22, 1924.

In 1926, Campbell was able to estimate a velocity and apex of solar motion in equatorial coordinates based on the radial velocity study:

V_{0}	19.6±0.40 km/s
α_{0}	271.5°±1.40°
δ_{0}	+28.6°±1.17°

This is located in the constellation of Hercules not far from the present day estimated position of (α = 271°, δ = 30°) and velocity 19.7 km/s. The observatory remained in operation under Lick observatory control until 1928, with about 10,700 spectrograms being produced. The results of the observation program from both hemispheres were published at that time.

=== Purchase and subsequent use ===
The observatory was purchased by the Chilean lawyer Manuel Foster Recabarren, who then donated it to the Universidad Católica de Chile in 1928. At that time it was the largest operational telescope in the southern hemisphere and the tenth largest in the world. During the 1940s, it was used by the German astronomer Erich P. Heilmeier for the spectroscopic study of Beta Cephei and other variable stars. Because of the growth of the Santiago metropolis, observing conditions grew steadily worse. Part of the observatory was damaged in a fire and an assistant lost an eye in an accident. Heilmeier complained about the lack of running water, astronomers, and funding. The University continued to operate it sporadically until 1948, when technical and economic problems caused it to cease operations.

Restoration of the observatory began in the 1980s, and, since 1982, the observatory was used once more by the University for research and instruction. Particular attention was paid to the study of RS CVn variables, Wolf–Rayet stars, and Beta Cephei stars. In 1986, observations of Halley's Comet were made for the general public, then of the supernova SN 1987A in 1984. However, the observation quality became degraded over time due to the growth of the city and its light pollution. The observatory ceased operations altogether in 1995, and was declared a national monument in 2010. The site is now used primarily for education purposes and is open for guided tours of the general public.

== See also ==
- List of astronomical observatories
