= Santiago Metropolitan Park =

Urban park in Santiago, Chile

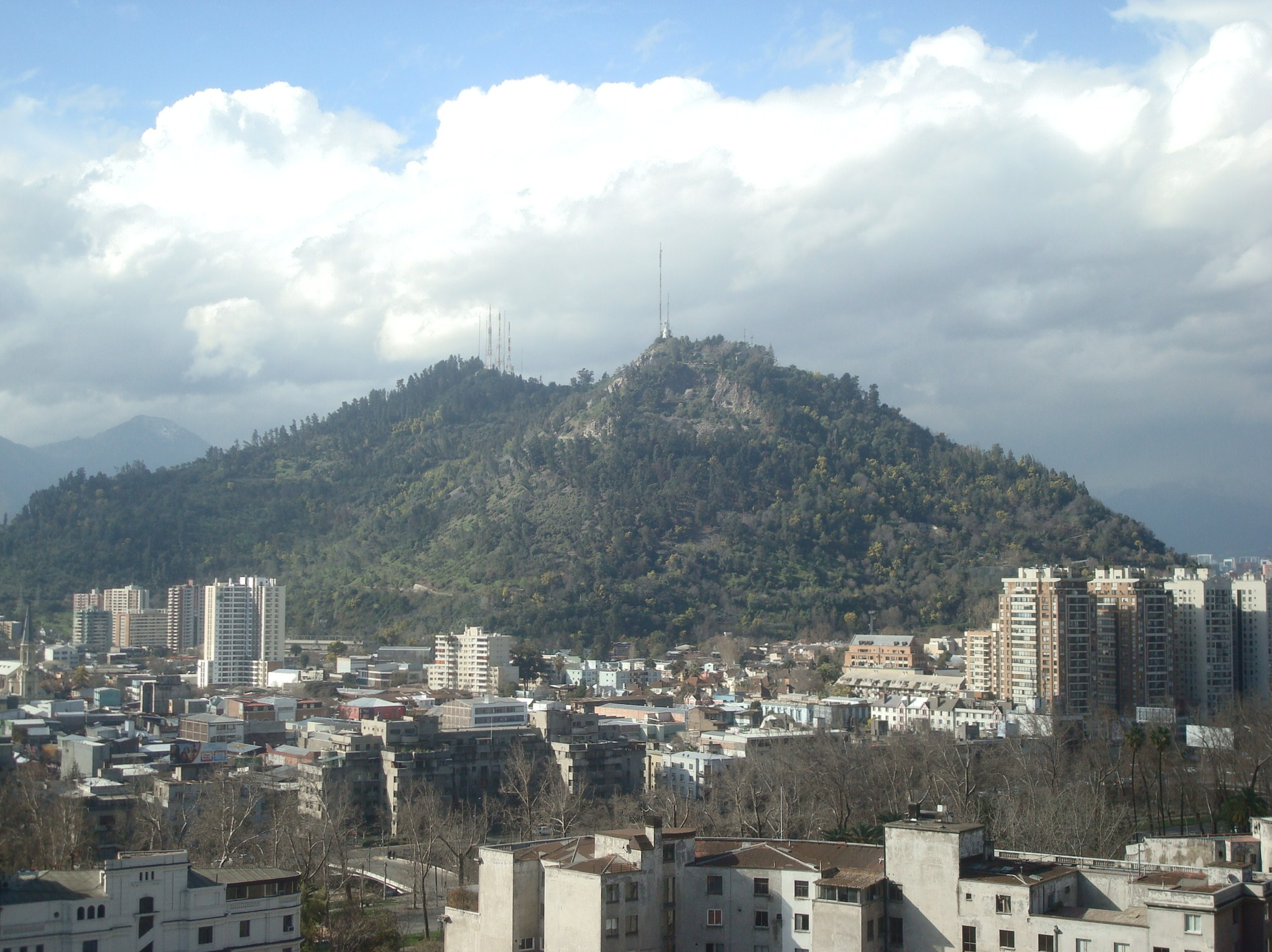
- View of San Cristóbal Hill, a large part of the park.
- Interactive map of Santiago Metropolitan Park
- Type: Urban park
- Location: Santiago, Chile
- Coordinates: 33°25′25″S 70°37′57″W
- Area: Approximately 722 hectares (1,780 acres)
- Created: 1922–1927
- Operator: Ministry of Housing and Urbanism of Chile

The Santiago Metropolitan Park (Spanish: Parque Metropolitano de Santiago) is an urban park located within the city of Santiago, capital of Chile. Consisting of the San Cristóbal, Chacarillas and Los Gemelos hills, and the areas of Tupahue, Lo Saldés, Pirámide and Bosque Santiago, the park is located between four communes of Santiago – Huechuraba, Providencia, Recoleta and Vitacura – and covers around 722 hectares, making it the largest urban park of the Americas and one of the largest in the world.

The Santiago Metropolitan Park also maintains 16 Urban Parks distributed throughout 13 communes in Santiago, a total area of almost 150.1 hectares. The maintenance work is carried out through "Urban Parks' Conservation, Maintenance and Safety" projects which involve cleaning, irrigation, replantation and management of vegetal species, maintenance of urban equipment, sanitation control, weed control, fertilization and safety among other activities.

The park was created in April 1966, when incorporating the Chilean National Zoo and the services of San Cristóbal Hill, and is managed by the Ministry of Housing and Urban Development. In September, 2012, the Chilean government launched a plan to significantly refurbish and expand the park between 2012 and 2016, a plan which includes building new footpaths, planting 100,000 more trees and expanding the National Zoo.

== Origins and history ==
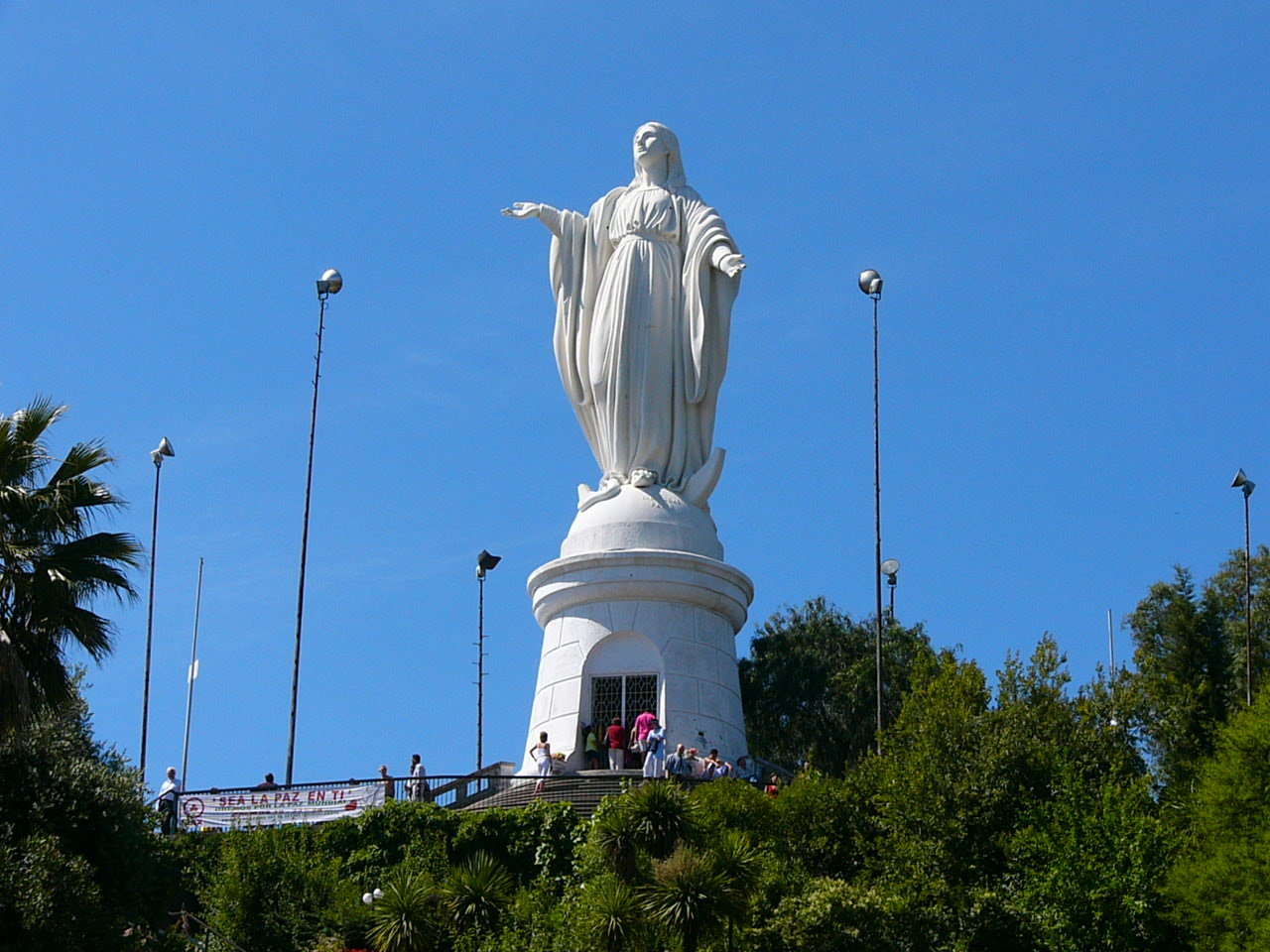
Statue of the Virgin Mary on the summit of San Cristóbal Hill.

San Cristóbal Hill began to be used in 1903 with the installation of the Mills Observatory, currently known as the Manuel Foster Observatory, twin of the Lick Observatory of the University of California.

The main icon on the hill, the Statue of the Virgin Mary on San Cristóbal Hill, was inaugurated on April 26, 1908.

In 1916, a project led by Alberto Mackenna Subercaseaux and Pedro Bannen sought to transform the hill into a park and public recreational area. On September 28, 1917, Law No. 3295 was published in the Official Gazette which authorized president Juan Luis Sanfuentes to accept donations, purchase or expropriate land located between Bosque Santiago and San Cristóbal Hill, inclusive. Said land was declared for public use and the creation of the future park.

The then Intendant of Santiago, Pablo Urzúa, took official possession of the park's land on June 17, 1918. It was however during the period of intendant Alberto Mackenna, between 1921 and 1927, that the Hill was landscaped and prepared for public use.

== Attractions ==
=== Pools ===
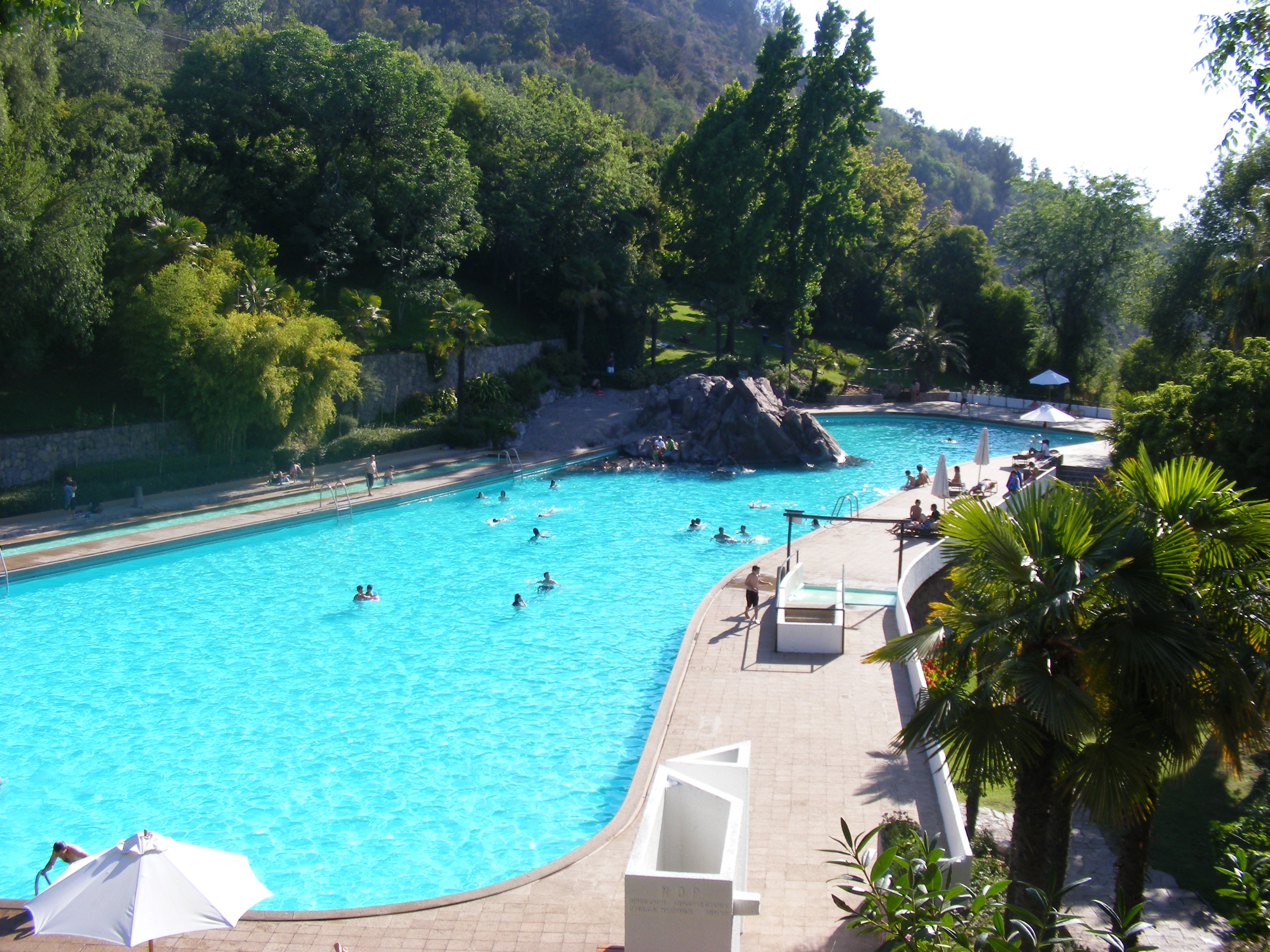
Pool on Tupahue Hill.

The park has two open-air pools: the Tupahue pool (meaning "place of God" in Quechua) and Antilén pool ("there is sun" in Mapundungun). Both operate in the summer from November through March.

The Tupahue pool was opened in 1966 on Tupahue hill, in what was originally a quarry. Surrounded by vegetation, there is a stone wall by Chilean muralist María Martner and Mexican Juan O’Gorman. The pool is 82 meters long and 25 meters wide.

The Antilén pool was opened in 1976. It is located on the summit of Chacarillas hill with a 360-degree panoramic view of the city. The pool is 92 meters long and 25 meters wide.

=== Cable car ===
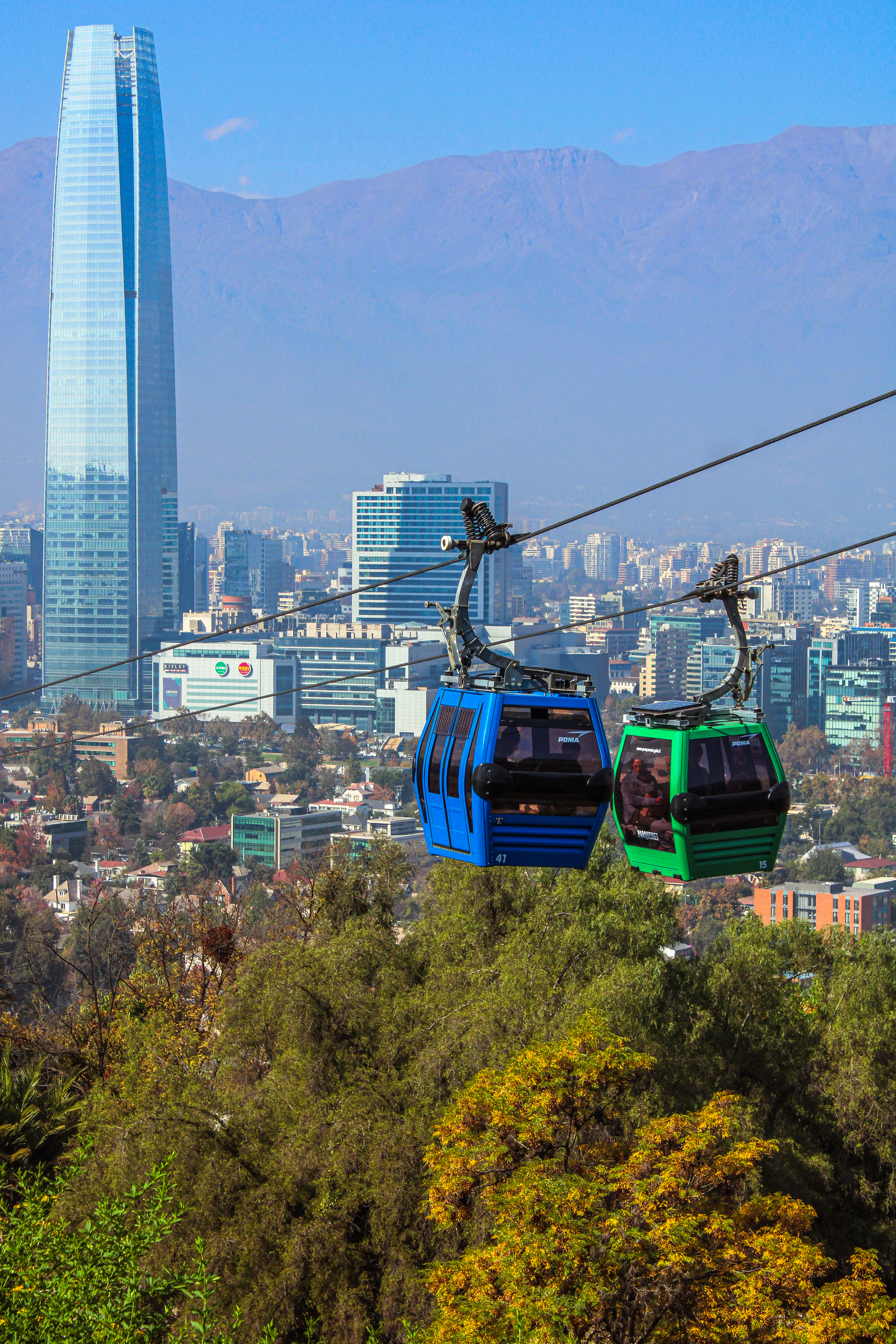
Santiago Cable Car

The Santiago Cable Car was opened in 1980 and takes visitors from the base of the hill, in Pedro de Valdivia Norte neighborhood (Estación Oasis) to the summit (Estación Cumbre) in 20 minutes, passing through Tupahue station. The Tupahue pool is located at Estación Tupahue, as is the Mapulemu Botanic Garden ("forest of the earth" in Mapundungun) and the Camino Real restaurant.

At the summit, tourists can visit the Sanctuary on San Cristóbal Hill and take the Funicular, which runs between Barrio Bellavista and the summit of San Cristóbal Hill.

As of 2012, the Cable Car remains closed due to mechanical failures. Its restoration has been marked as part of the government's Bicentenary Plan.

In December 2014, it was announced that the cable car would be reopening in 2016 with work on the project starting in March 2015. The project will cost 9.5 million dollars. The cable car was reopened in November 2016.

=== Funicular ===
The Funicular de Santiago, which dates from 1925, has been declared a National Monument. It has two stations: the National Zoo and the summit. The funicular runs for almost 500 meters on a 45 degree incline, departing from Barrio Bellavista.

The funicular has two carriages, with one displaying a memorial plaque commemorating Pope John Paul II, who rode in the carriage in 1987 en route to saying mass at the feet of the Virgin Mary statue located at the hill's summit.

In September 2012, the funicular was marked for refurbishment as part of the Chilean government's Bicentenary Plan.

=== National Zoo ===
The Chilean National Zoo has thousands of animals representing 158 species.

=== Botanical Garden ===
Located within the park, the Botanical Garden contains various plants native to Chile and its mission includes conservation and research.

=== Sanctuary ===
A religious sanctuary atop San Cristóbal Hill commemorating the Immaculate Conception, is notable for its large statue of the Virgin Mary.

=== Bicentenary Children's Park ===
This park was opened in 2012 and has an amphitheater, treehouses, water features, interactive fence and a cable car.

== Torre Antena ==
The winning design for the new tower

As it stands today, there are numerous Radio Antennas on the top of the hill that have become an eyesore. The Government of Santiago has come up with a solution to tear down all the existing antennas and instead combine them in one giant antenna that would also serve as a new landmark for Santiago. In late 2013 the city held a design contest for the new tower with the winning bid being announced in February of the following year.

== See also ==
- San Cristóbal Hill
- Jardín Botánico Chagual
- Sanctuary on San Cristóbal Hill
