= San Cristóbal Hill =

Mountain in Santiago, Chile

Cerro San Cristóbal Tupahue
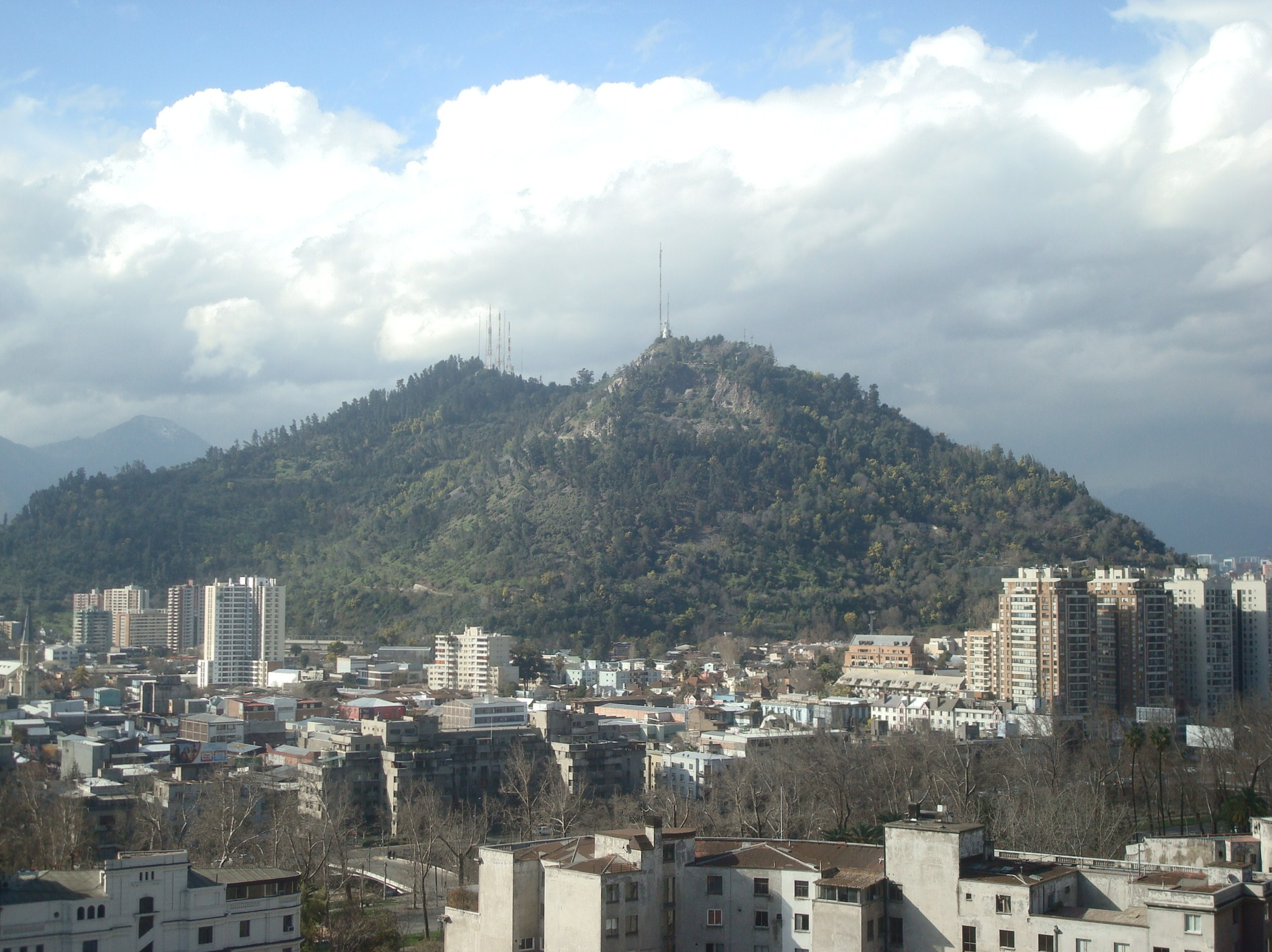
- View of Cerro San Cristóbal

Highest point
- Elevation: 880 m (2,890 ft)
- Parent peak: Cerro Las Canteras
- Isolation: 3.6 mi (5.8 km)
- Coordinates: 33°25′13″S 70°37′48″W

Geography
- Location within Chile
- Location: Chile
- Parent range: Andes

Climbing
- First ascent: Unknown
- Easiest route: From Santiago

San Cristóbal Hill (Spanish: Cerro San Cristóbal, Mapuche: Tupahue) is a hill in northern Santiago, Chile. It rises 880 m AMSL and about 300 m above the rest of Santiago; the peak is the third highest point in the city, after Cerro Manquehue and Cerro Renca. Cerro San Cristóbal was named by the Spanish conquistadors for St Christopher, in recognition of its use as a landmark. Its original indigenous name is Tupahue.

== History and attractions ==
Cerro San Cristóbal began to be used in 1903 with the installation of the Mills Observatory, currently known as the Manuel Foster Observatory, twin of the Lick Observatory of the University of California.

On its summit there is a sanctuary dedicated to the Immaculate Conception, with a 22-meter statue of the Blessed Virgin Mary, an amphitheater and a chapel. The statue of the Immaculate Conception measures 14 meters tall, and the pedestal on which it rests is 8.3 meters in height. It weighs 36,610 kilograms. Within the pedestal there is a small chapel in which Pope John Paul II prayed and blessed the city of Santiago on April 1, 1987. The statue is lit up at night by lights placed on its sides, allowing it to be viewed from all over Santiago both day and night.

At the foot of the statue there is an amphitheater for holding masses or other religious ceremonies. Near the statue, there is also a small chapel for praying.

At the foothills of Cerro San Cristóbal are the Chilean National Zoo and a Japanese-style garden, and up there are also two municipal pools, Tupahue and Antilén.

Cerro San Cristóbal houses Santiago's largest public park: the Santiago Metropolitan Park (Parque Metropolitano).

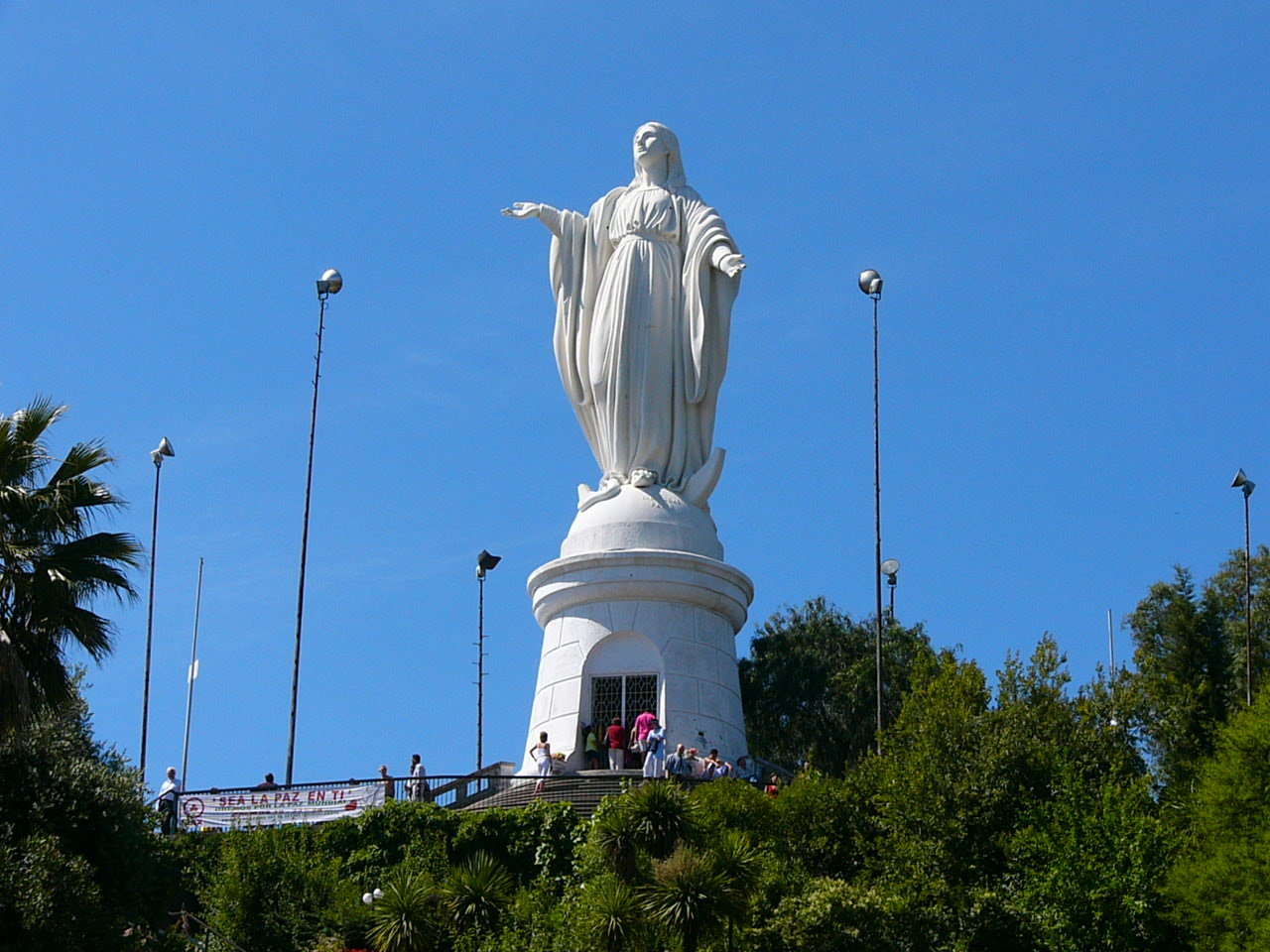
Statue of the Virgin Mary on the top of Cerro San Cristóbal.

== Access ==
The summit of Cerro San Cristóbal can be reached by foot (about a 45-minute walk, involving a 300m change in elevation), by car via the road joining the Santiago Metropolitan Park, by the Funicular de Santiago (the base of which sits next to the Zoo at the North end of Pio Nono in Barrio Bellavista), or by a Teleferico (cable car located northeast at the Oasis station).

A cable car provided service to the top of the hill from the Pedro de Valdivia entrance since 1980 until 2009, when the gearbox controlling the system's speed exploded, leaving the system unusable. A project was presented in 2011 to open for tender on the system, giving it new cabins and restore infrastructure. The service was expected to be back in 2012, however the Ministry of Housing and Urban Planning received only one offer that was rejected, so the tender was ended and a new public contest was announced, that began in 2013.
Then, in December 2014 it was announced that the cable car would re-open in the second semester of 2016 after a series of maintenance and remodeling works to be done from March 2015, costing US$9.5 million. These works complete the installation of the new 46 cabin network, of which 8 will be enabled for the transport of bicycles, strollers or wheelchairs. The transport cabins have a 6-person capacity and the system was reopened in November 2016.

From the top of the hill are two pools – Tupahue and Antilén, and access the National Zoo of Chile at the Bellavista entrance to Cerro San Cristóbal. The Children's Park of Cerro San Cristóbal also provides entrance to the hill via Avenida Perú.
