= Niata cattle =

Extinct breed of dwarf cattle

Niata
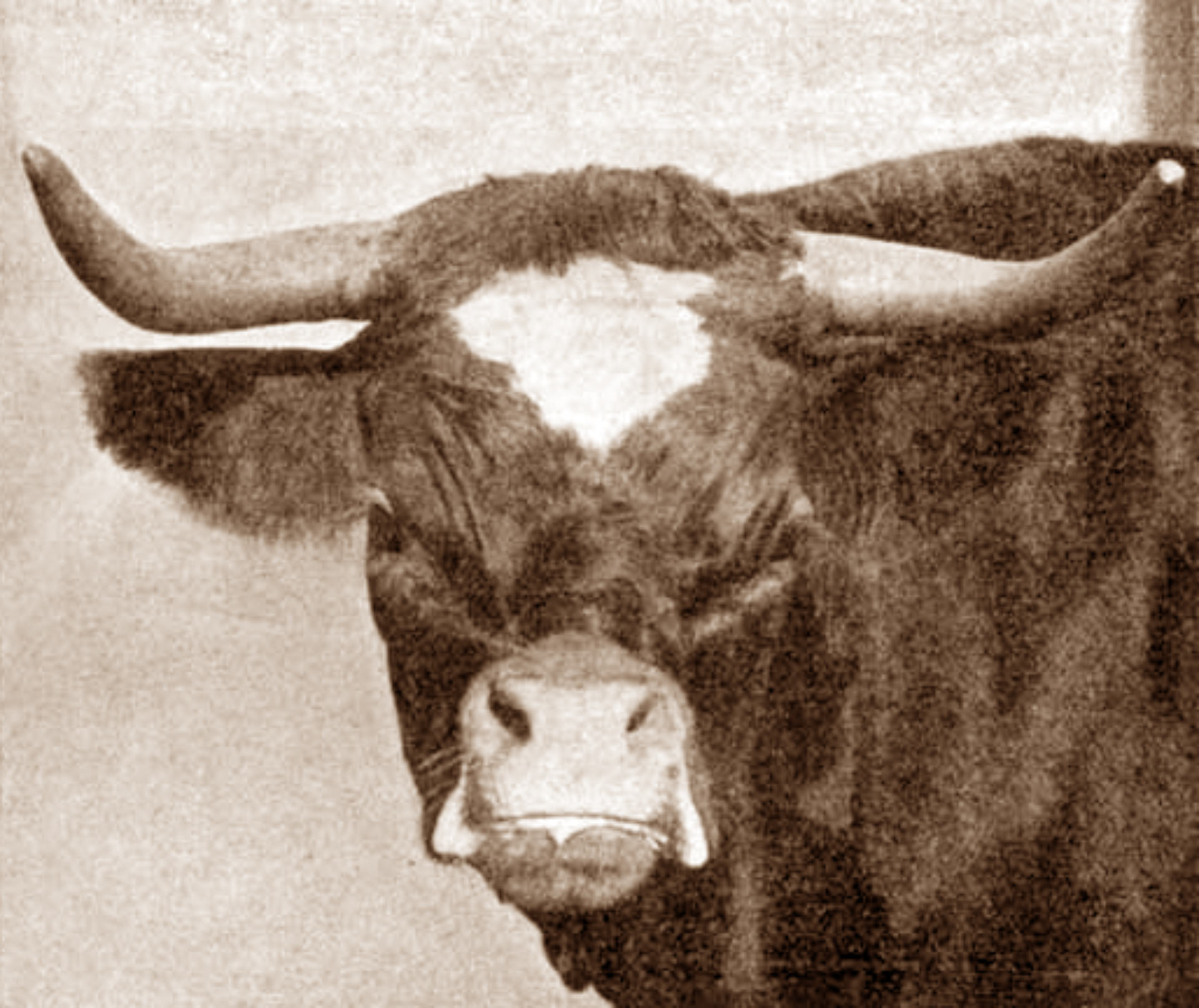
- Photograph of a Niata cow, about 1890
- Conservation status: extinct
- Country of origin: Argentina; Uruguay
- Cattle; Bos (primigenius) taurus

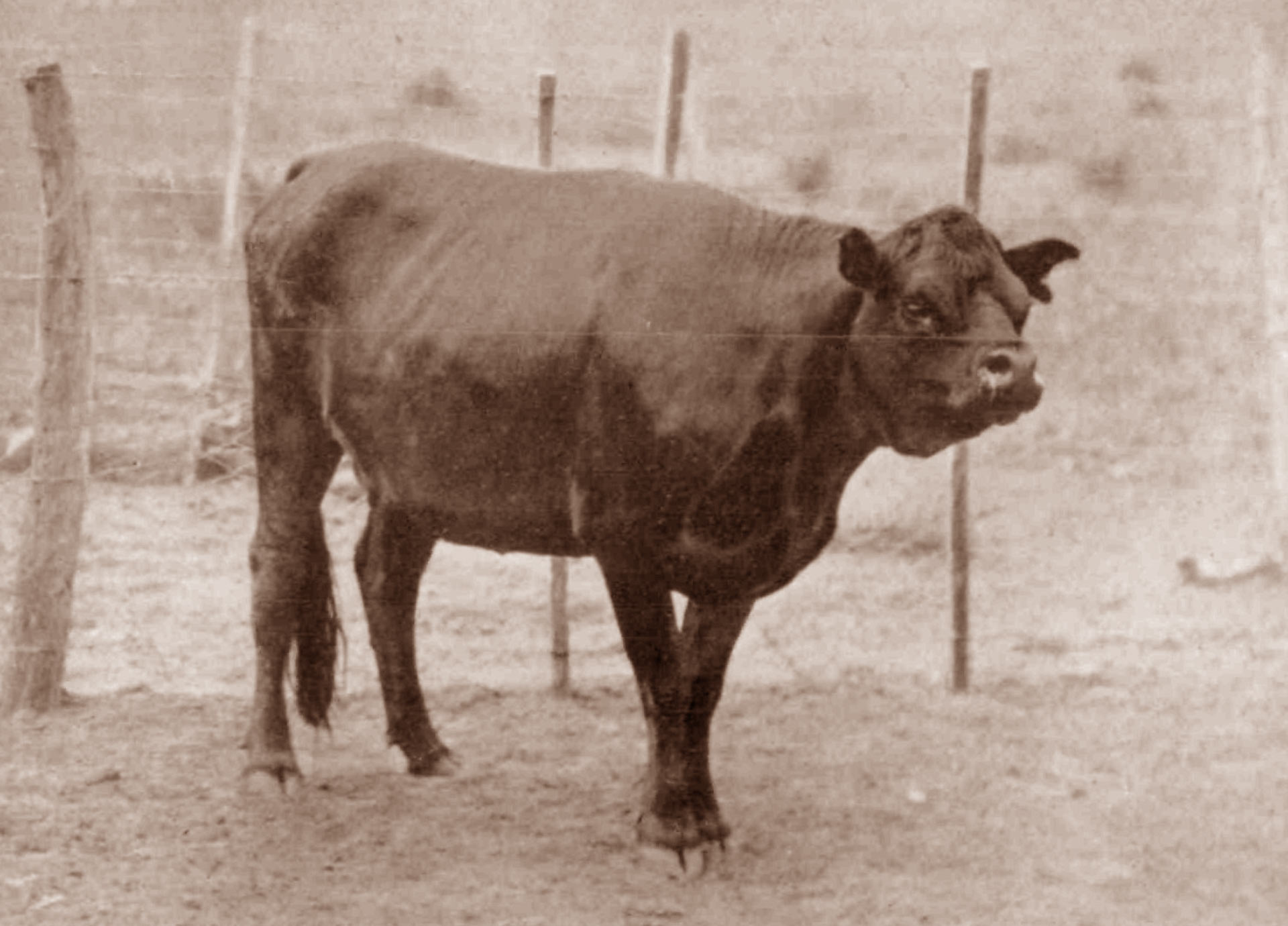
Niata cow

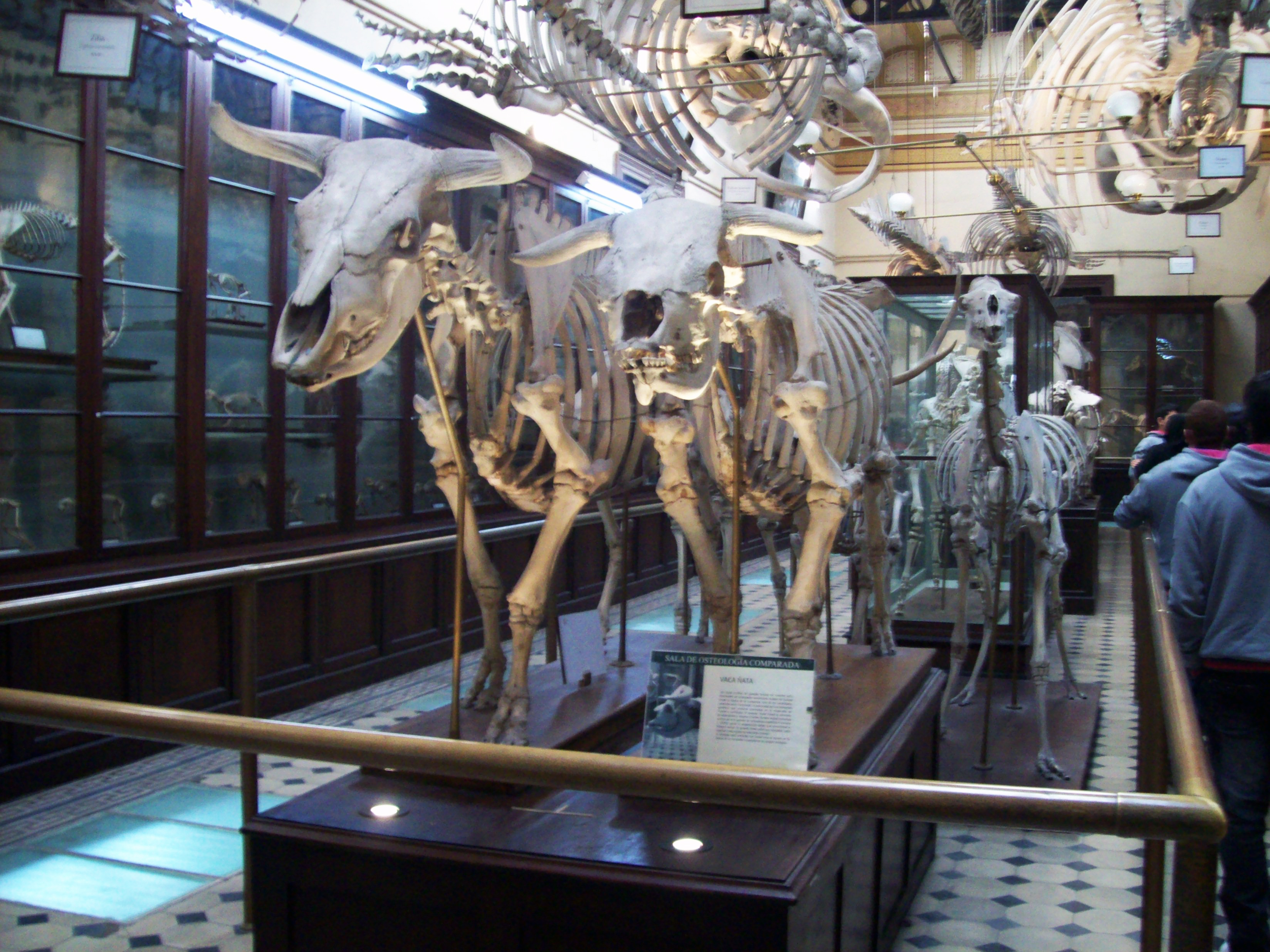
Niata skeleton (right) in the Museo de La Plata, in La Plata, Argentina

The Niata or Ñata is an extinct breed of dwarf cattle from Uruguay and Argentina. It was observed and described by Charles Darwin in the 1830s. One was exhibited at the Segunda Exposición Internacional de Ganadería y Agricultura in Buenos Aires in April 1890. By the early twentieth century the Niata was nearly or completely extinct.

== History ==
An early description of the Niata is that from November 1833 by Charles Darwin, who twice saw cattle of this type.

George Ernest Gibson bought two in 1889, one of which was exhibited at the Segunda Exposición Internacional de Ganadería y Agricultura in Buenos Aires in April 1890.

Darwin described the Niata as a true breed, in which mating of a cow and bull resulted in calves of the same type; a morphometric and genetic study of museum specimens in 2018 found it to conform to modern definitions of a breed. He suggested that the Niata had been eradicated by estancieros who believed it to be poorly adapted to the environment and of little use. By the early twentieth century it was nearly or completely extinct.

== Characteristics ==
The Niata differed from other cattle only in its markedly foreshortened skull; it did not display other signs of chondrodysplasia. The shape of the skull did not impede its breathing.

According to Gibson, the usual colour was dun, with black legs.

Both Darwin and Ramón Lista describe the Niata as fierce or wild; Gibson discusses a small herd that was "exceedingly tame'".
