= Santiago Cable Car =

Cable car system in Santiago, Chile

Teleférico de Santiago
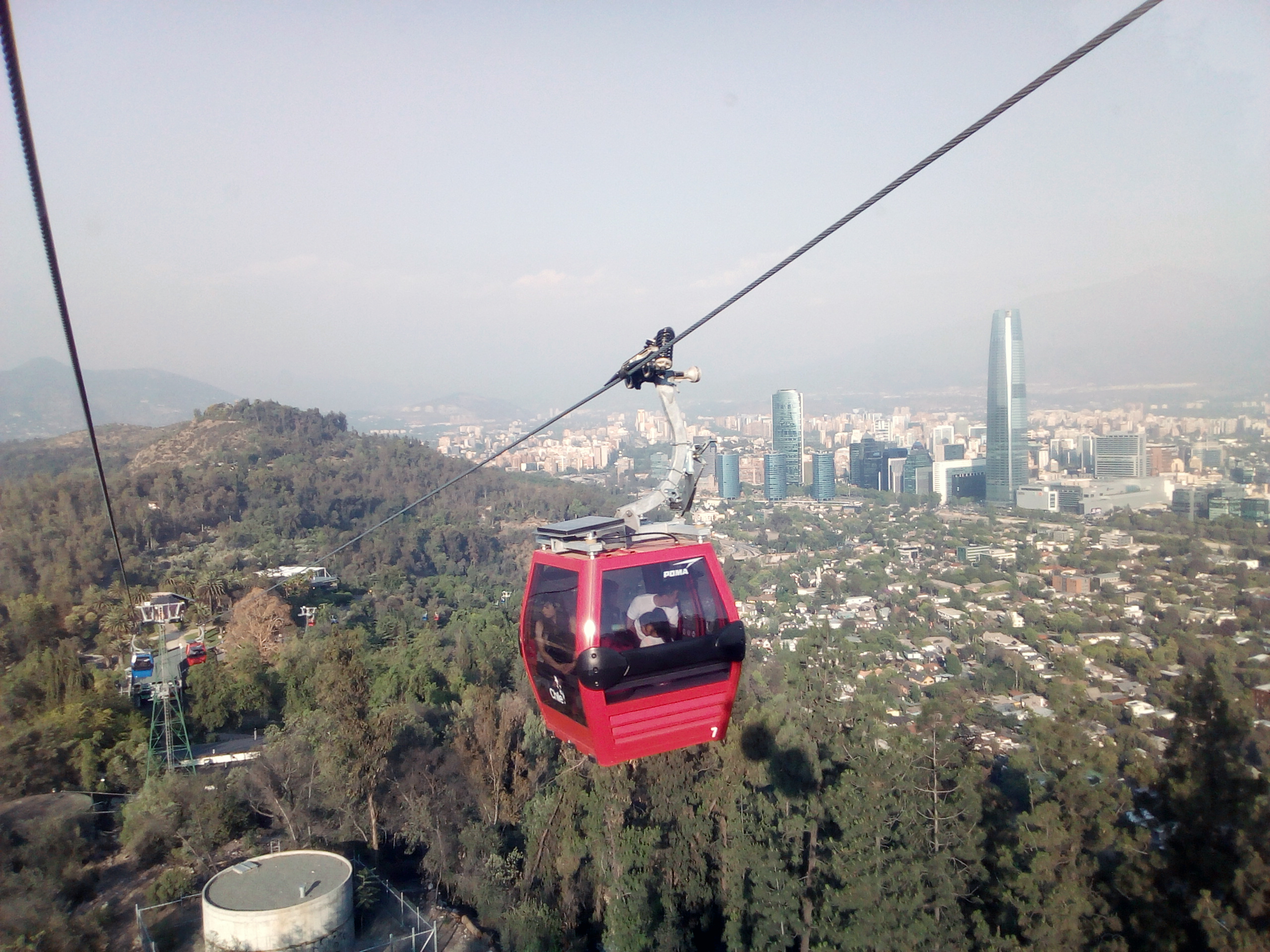
- View from the cable car (2016)

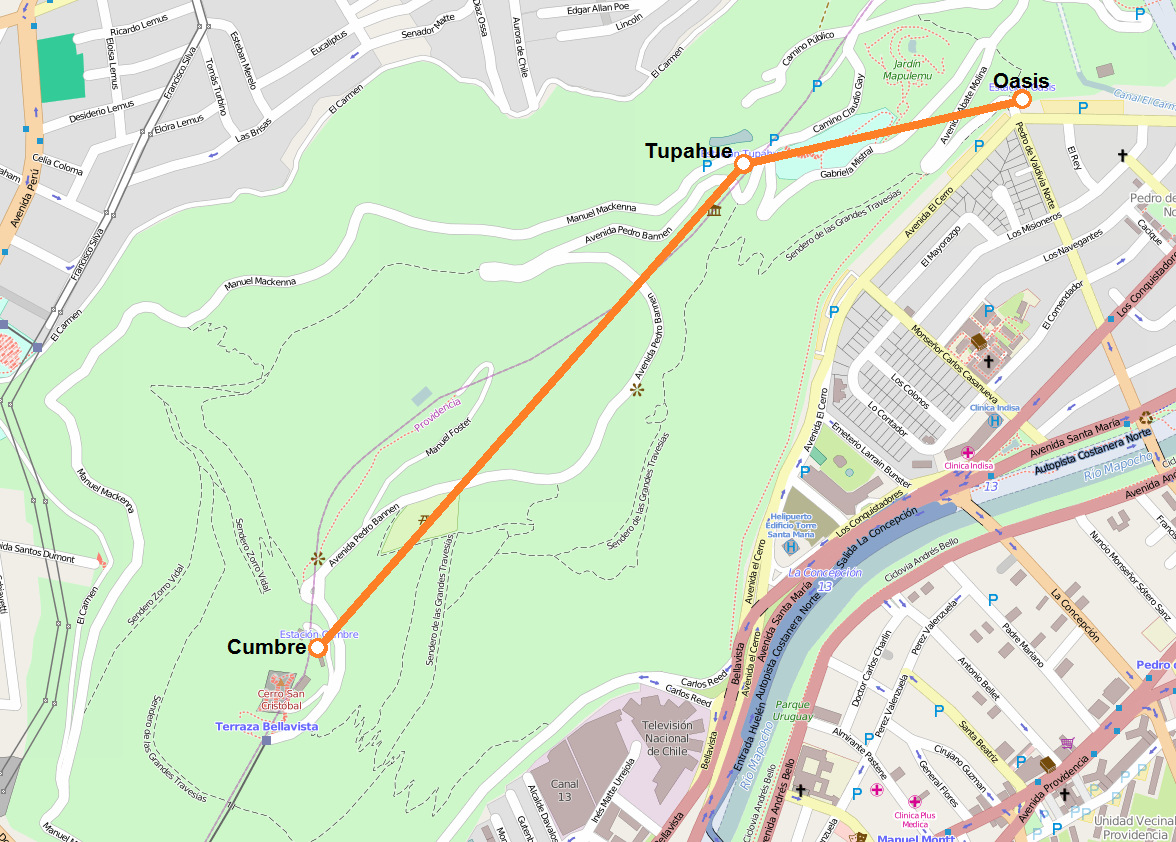
- Route Map of the Santiago Cable Car
- Interactive map of Teleférico de Santiago

Overview
- Status: Operational
- Character: Aerial tramway
- Location: San Cristóbal Hill, Santiago
- Country: Chile
- Termini: Oasis station Cumbre station
- No. of stations: 3
- Open: 1 April 1980
- Closed: 7 June 2009
- Reopened: 24 November 2016
- Website: telefericosantiago.cl

Operation
- Operator: Turistik
- No. of carriers: 47 cabins
- Carrier capacity: 6 passengers

Technical features
- Line length: 4.8 km (3.0 mi)
- Operating speed: 18 km/h (11 mph)
- Notes: Electric motor powering cable bullwheel

The Santiago Cable Car (Spanish: Teleférico de Santiago) is an aerial tramway serving tourists, located at the Metropolitan Park of San Cristóbal Hill, in Santiago, Chile.

== History ==
=== First era (1980-2009) ===
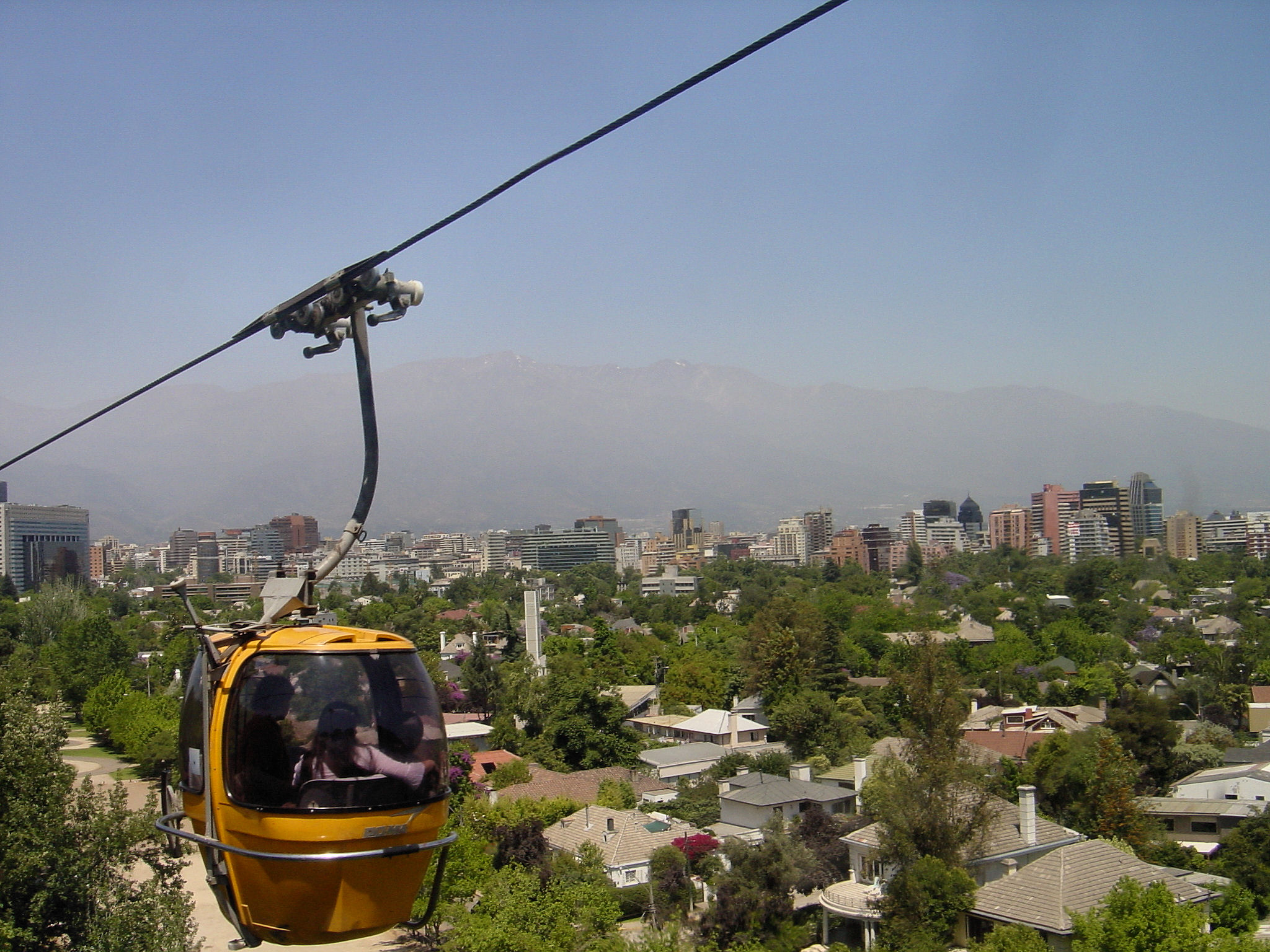
Old Santiago Cable Car (2006)

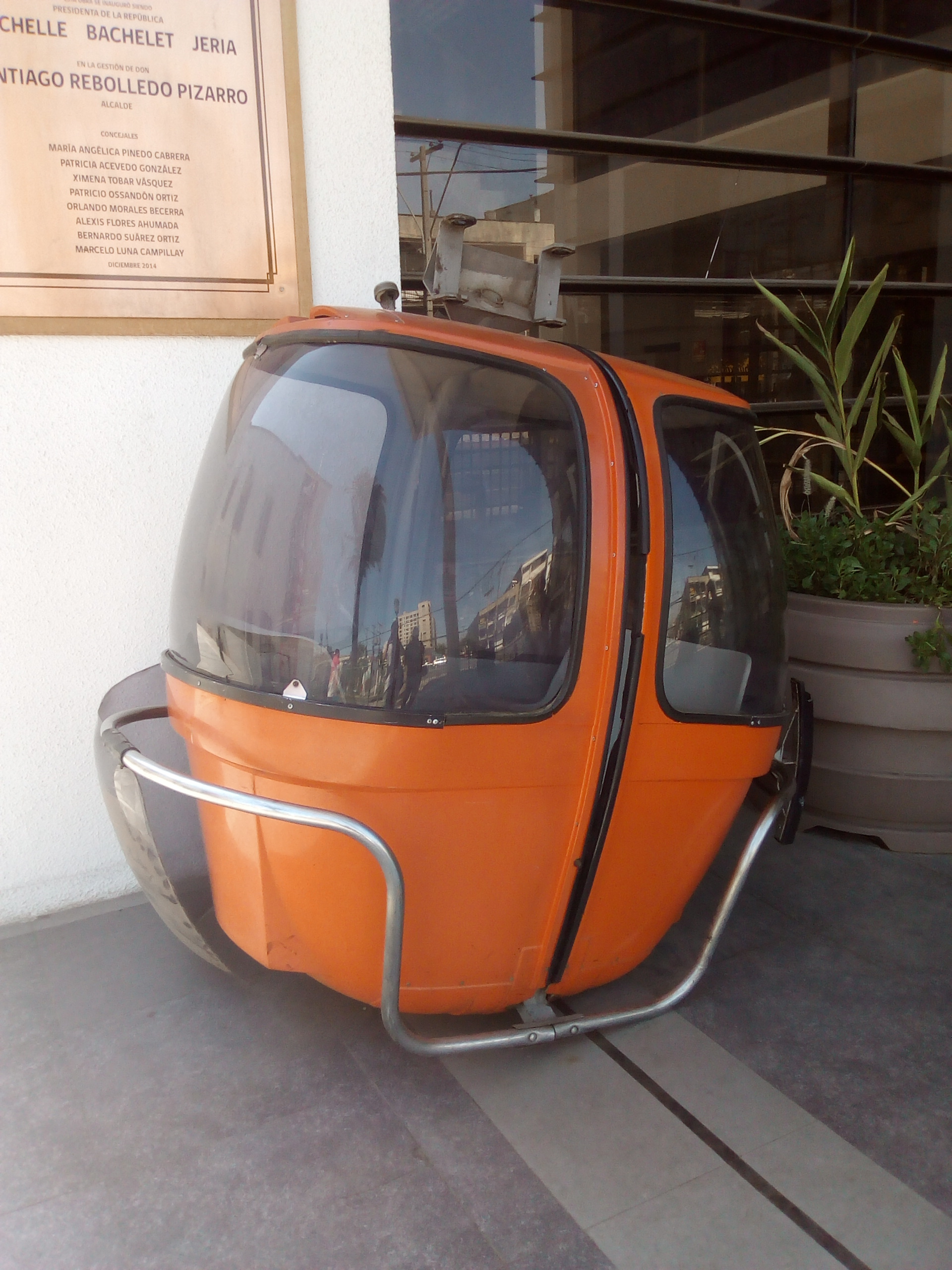
Old cabin of the cable car on display at the La Cisterna town hall

The construction of the cable car began in 1979, and took about a year, mainly due to the hardness of the volcanic rock terrain in which the 12 towers were installed.

The Santiago Cable Car was officially opened on April 1, 1980, with 72 ovoid-shaped cars, which covered the 20-minute 4.8 km section at 14.4 km/h.

On December 12, 2008, a mechanical fault left 20 people trapped in the cable car for two hours, without registering any injuries. Subsequently, on June 7, 2009, another mechanical failure occurred in the system: the gearbox that regulated the speed of the system exploded, which caused the indefinite suspension of the service.

=== Second era (2016-present) ===
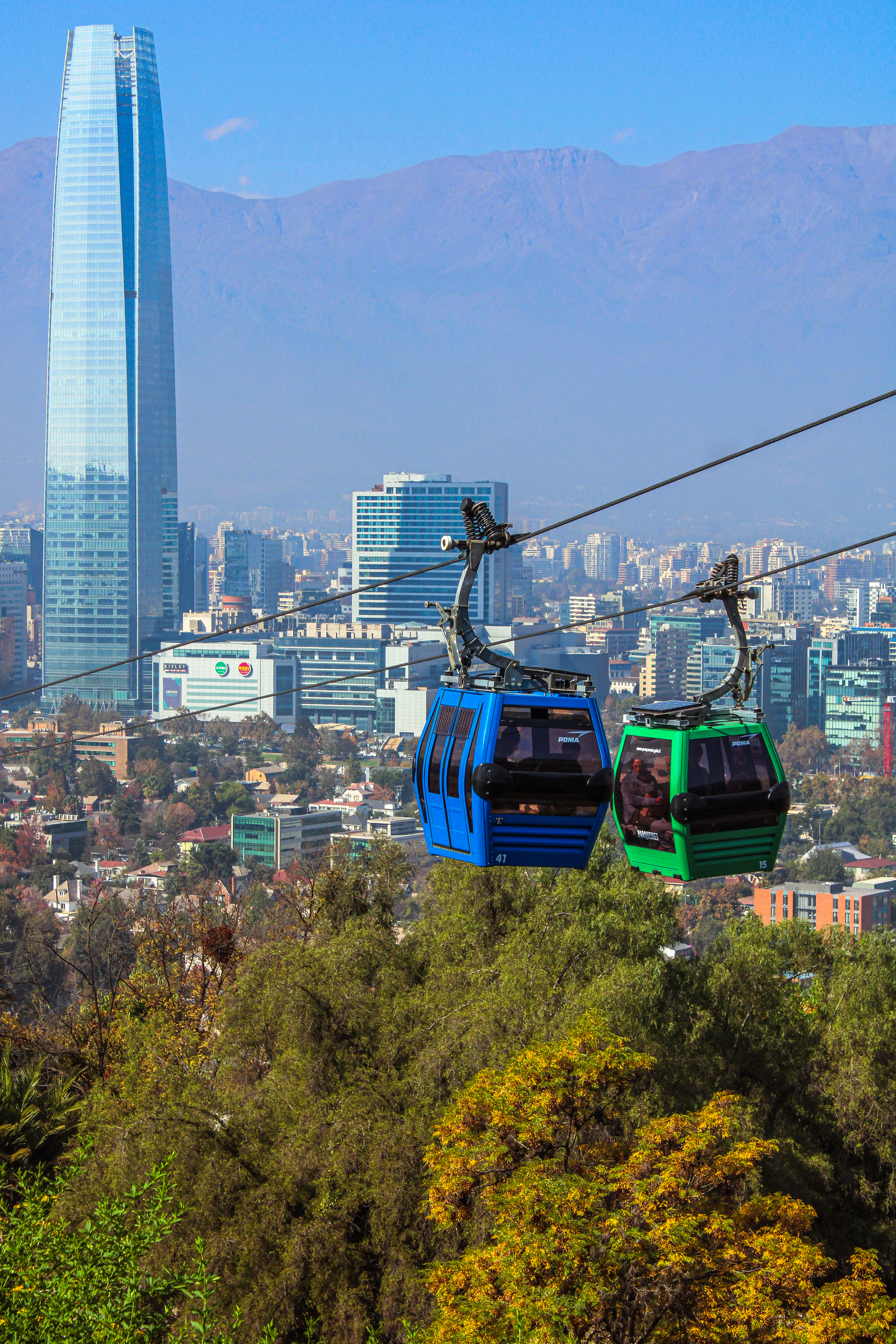
2 Cable cars with Gran Torre Costanera in the Background.

In 2011 a project was presented to tender the cable car, provide it with new cabins and restore the infrastructure. It was expected that in 2012 the service reopened the public, nevertheless the Ministry of Housing and Urban Development received only one offer which it rejected, reason why it declared deserted the licitation and announced a new public contest, that began in November 2013.

In December 2014, it was announced that the cable car would be reopened in the second half of 2016, following a series of maintenance and remodeling works that began in March 2015 and will cost 9.5 million dollars. These works included the installation of the new network of 47 cabins with capacity for six people each.

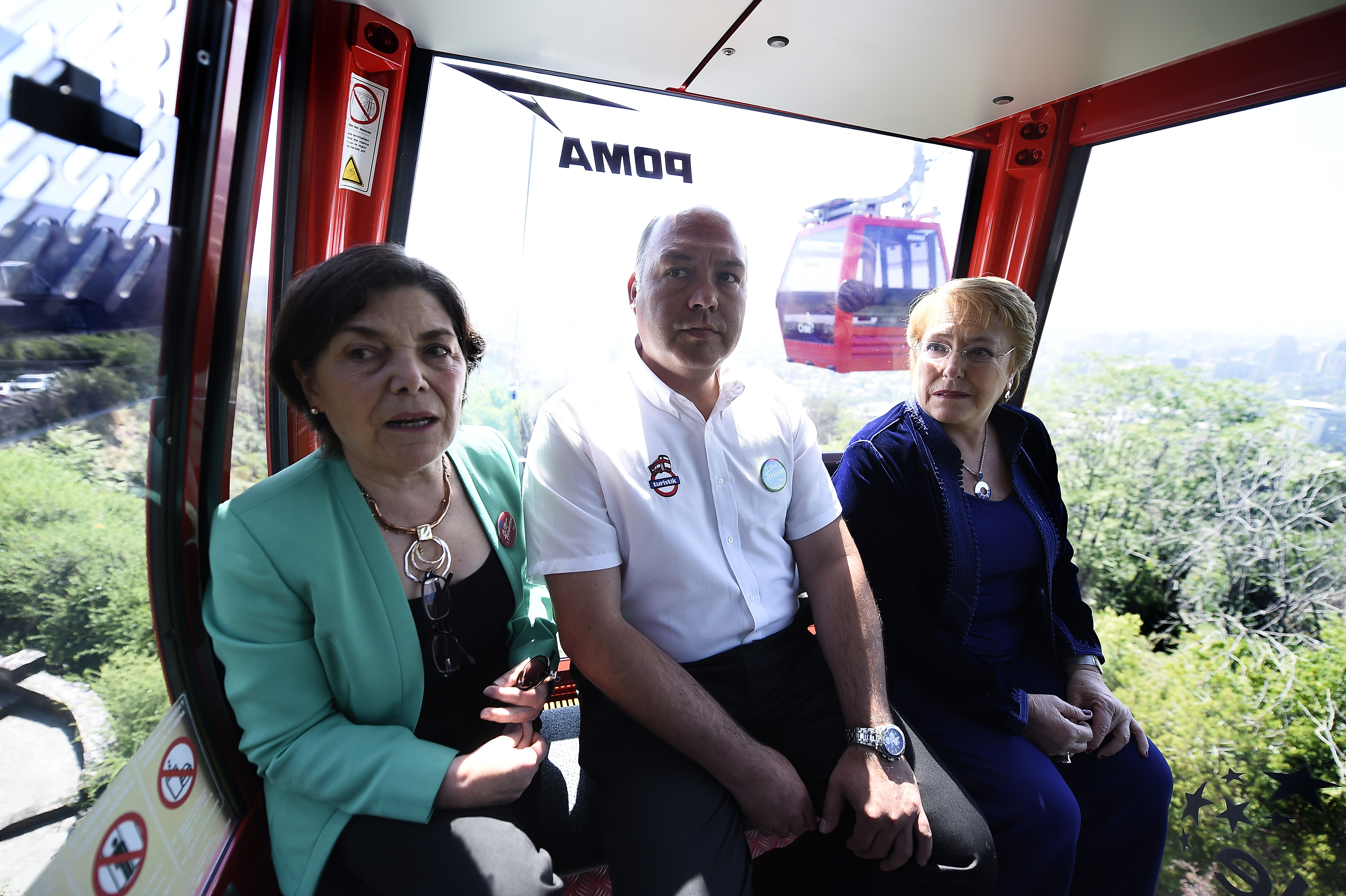
Reopening of the cable car, 24 November 2016

In January 2016, the Chilean Ministry of Housing and Urban Development launched a public competition for social and non-governmental organizations, neighborhood or municipal councils to submit projects to recover assets of the 56 cabins that were discontinued and which were part of the original system in 1980. On July 29 of the same year the winning projects, which included libraries, recreational spaces, and a motorized train in Pueblito Las Vizcachas were presented at the Espacio Matta Cultural Center.

The cable car was reopened on November 24, 2016, by President Michelle Bachelet. Between December 14 and 16, the cable car closed temporarily due to its first maintenance operation after reaching 500 operating hours and receiving more than 68 thousand visits in 16 days.

In February 2026 a second cable car line, the Teleférico II Pío Nono–Plaza México, was opened in the Metropolitan Park. The route runs from the National Zoo entrance on Pío Nono Street to Plaza México, near the summit. It makes the roughly 1km journey in just over seven minutes, with a capacity of 800 passengers per hour. It is also operated by Turistik.

== Characteristics ==
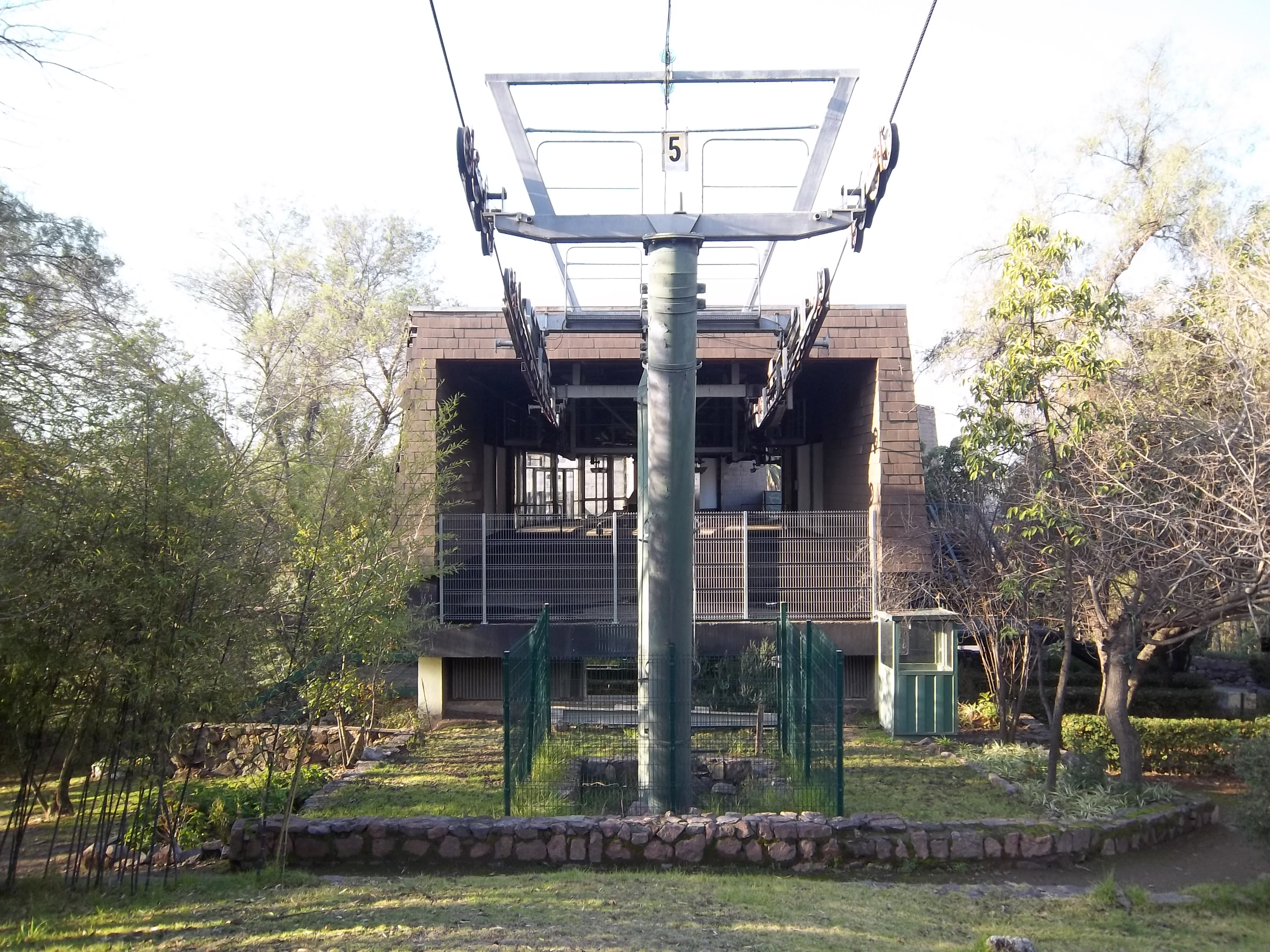
Tupahue station in 2011

The new cable car has 47 cabins (16 red, 16 blue and 15 green) that can carry up to 6 people each, plus 8 cars designed exclusively to carry bicycles (four in each cart) and a maintenance trolley. Its speed varies between 1 and 5 meters per second (18 km/h).

The system has three stations: Oasis, Tupahue and Cumbre. At the last of these it connects with the Funicular de Santiago. The Tupahue is located near the Tupahue Pool, the Mapulemu Botanical Garden ("Forest of the Earth") and the Camino Real Restaurant.
