= Parroquia de Santa Filomena =

Church building in Recoleta, Chile

Coordinates: 33°25′46.70″S 70°38′36.65″W

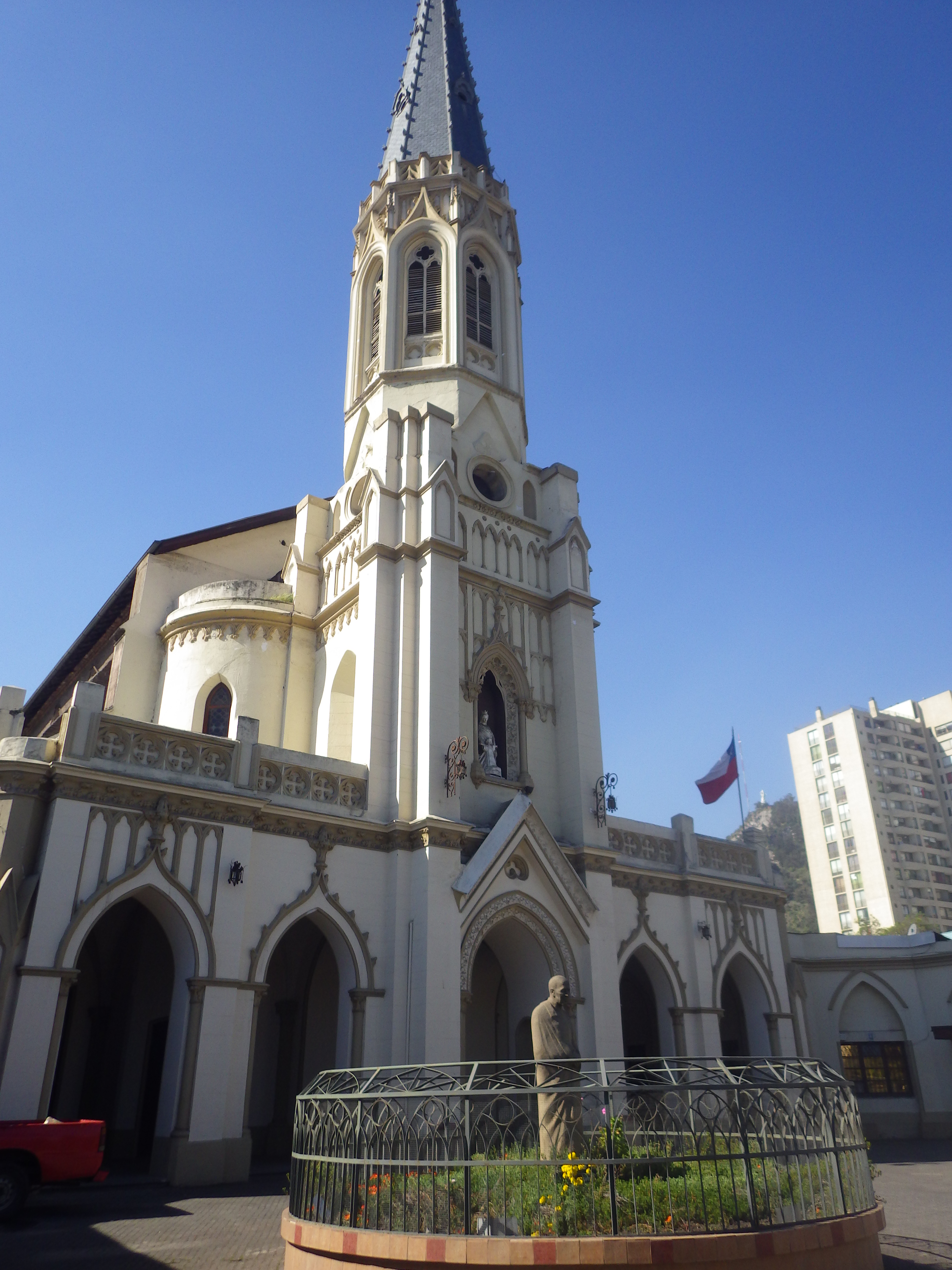
Photo of the church.

Parroquia de Santa Filomena ('Parish of Santa Filomena') is a church located in the Patronato District of the Recoleta Municipality in the city of Santiago, Chile. This church is named after Santa Filomena, a saint and a martyr.

The Santa Filomena Church was built in 1884 by the architect Eugenio Joannon and under the supervision of Ruperto Marchant, a priest. This church is the result of the war against the Indians volunteer and non profit organizations that followed the Rerum novarum encyclical published by Pope Leo XII.

The church follows a Neo-Gothic style. The inside is decorated with paintings that emulate materials such as stone and marble. A chiaroscuro effect is obtained with the glass paintings that were brought directly from France. This church was used by the Josephite Fathers Congregation that came from Italy and was built with donations from wealthy families of the nineteenth century.

The Santa Filomena church has resisted numerous earthquakes that have left it with structural damage. A 1985 earthquake was particularly harmful. The damage has however been repaired. Since 1995 the Santa Filomena Church was declared Chilean national heritage.

The church was restored thanks to the contributions of the Patronato District. It is not only an important attraction of this district, but it is also used a temple of worship.
