= Chilean National Zoo =

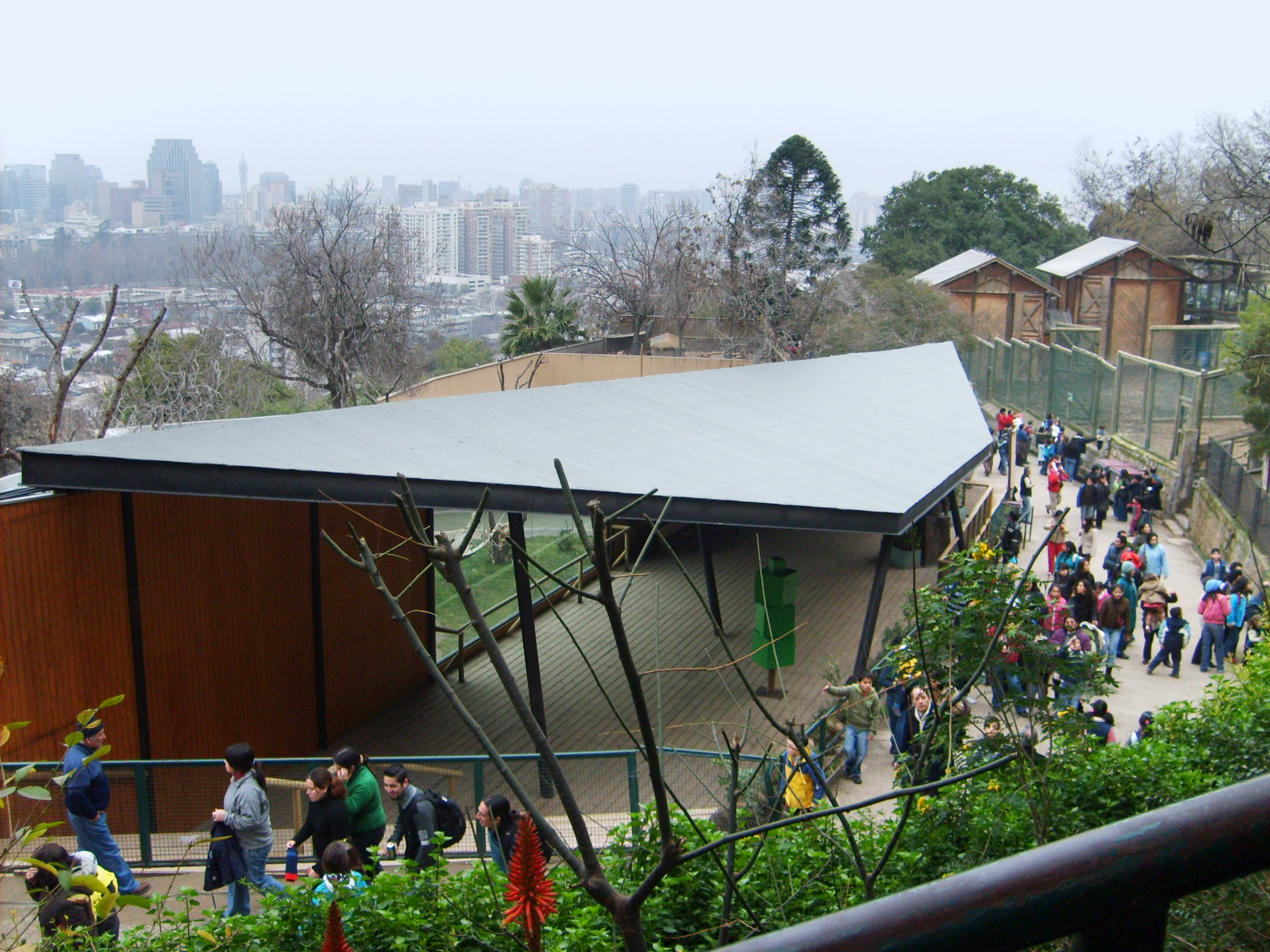
- Interactive map of Chilean National Zoo
- 33°25′47″S 70°38′03″W
- Date opened: 1925
- Location: Santiago, Chile
- Land area: 4.8 ha (12 acres)
- No. of species: 158
- Memberships: ALPZA, WAZA, ISIS
- Website: www.parquemet.cl/index.php?cat_id=1

The Chilean National Zoo (Zoo Nacional de Chile) is a 4.8-hectare (12-acre) zoo that was founded in 1925 in Santiago, Chile. Located at the foot of San Cristóbal Hill in what is known as the Santiago Metropolitan Park (Parque Metropolitano de Santiago), the zoo is home to thousands of animals representing 158 species. Unique exhibits feature Chilean native animals and birds including rare and endangered species.

The Chilean National Zoo has a dual focus: to conserve and research species held at the zoo, and to educate and provide activities for the visiting public.

== History ==
The history of the national zoo dates back to the 19th century. In 1882, the country's first zoo was inaugurated in Quinta Normal by professor Julio Bernard, followed twenty years later by another zoo in Concepción featuring native animals, founded by professor and entomologist Carlos Reed.

In 1921, Carlos Reed began a campaign with the Intendant of Santiago, Alberto Mackenna, to obtain financing and land for what would be the National Zoological Garden. On September 1, 1925, the then President of Chile, Arturo Alessandri Palma, issued Supreme Decree No. 4273, allocating 4.8 hectares of San Cristóbal Hill to building the zoo.

A number of species held at the Quinta Normal zoo were brought across to the new zoo along with 70 other animals from zoos in Mendoza and Buenos Aires via the Transandine Railway. Among the species forming a part of the new zoo were a camel, Somali sheep, two boas, a Ñata cow with an inherited abnormality, macaws, and a baboon. The zoo's installations were built in less than two months with the collaboration of architect Teodoro Panuzzis.

The National Zoo was officially opened by the Vice President of Chile, Luis Barros Borgoño, on December 12, 1925. The first director of the zoo was Carlos Reed. On May 21, 2016, Franco L.Ferrada jumped in the lion enclosure to commit suicide. The lions were shot and killed by the zoo officials.

== Animal welfare ==
In 1996, the New York Times accused the zoo of "deplorable conditions" including undersized, concrete living enclosures and possible mistreatment resulting in dozens of animal deaths.

== Installations ==
The zoo's population continues to grow, with a jaguar and a group of lemurs joining the over 1,000 animals of 158 species already on display in 2010. Large enclosures feature a wide variety of Chile's indigenous wildlife, including guanacos, llamas, rhea birds, condors, Humboldt penguins, and the endangered pudú. Also on display is Darwin's frog, a rare frog native to Chile known for its unique method of reproducing. The zoo also holds a large number of foreign species such as lions, giraffes, kangaroos, elephants, emus, and formerly polar bears. 24% of the mammals on display at the zoo are native to Chile, as are 37% of the birds.

More than 50 people work in the enclosure including veterinarians, caretakers, educational guides, cleaners, and administrative personnel.
