= Outline of Rio de Janeiro =

Overview of and topical guide to Rio de Janeiro

Flag of Rio de Janeiro

Coat of arms of Rio de Janeiro

The following outline is provided as an overview of and topical guide to Rio de Janeiro:

Rio de Janeiro – capital and most populous city of Rio de Janeiro state, and the second most populous city in Brazil, Rio de Janeiro was founded in 1565 by the Portuguese as part of the Portuguese Empire. It was the capital and political center of Brazil, where events like the Proclamation of the Republic took place. Brasília overtook Rio de Janeiro as the new capital of Brazil in 1960. Rio de Janeiro is known for its cultural riches, such as Carnival, samba and bossa nova, beaches such as Copacabana and Ipanema, and also for the Christ the Redeemer statue overlooking the city. Major education institutions include the Federal University of Rio de Janeiro, the Rio de Janeiro State University, and Colégio Pedro II.

== General reference ==
- Pronunciation: UK: /ˈriːoʊ də dʒəˈnɪəroʊ/ REE-oh də jə-NEER-oh, US: /ˈriːoʊ diː ʒəˈnɛəroʊ/ REE-oh dee zhə-NAIR-oh, Portuguese: [ˈʁi.u d(ʒi) ʒɐˈne(j)ɾu]
- Common English name(s): Rio de Janeiro
- Official English name(s): Rio de Janeiro
- Adjectival(s): Carioca
- Demonym(s): Carioca

== Geography of Rio de Janeiro ==
Geography of Rio de Janeiro

- Rio de Janeiro is:
  - a city
    - capital of Rio de Janeiro (state)
- Population of Rio de Janeiro: 7,456,682
- Area of Rio de Janeiro: 1,221 km^{2} (486.5 sq mi)

Rio de Janeiro
- Location within Brazil
- Coordinates: 22°54′30″S 43°11′47″W

=== Location of Rio de Janeiro ===
- Rio de Janeiro is situated within the following regions:
  - Southern Hemisphere and Western Hemisphere
    - South America (outline)
      - Brazil (outline)
        - Southeast Region, Brazil
          - Rio de Janeiro (state)
            - Greater Rio de Janeiro
- Time zone(s):
  - BRT (UTC−03)

=== Environment of Rio de Janeiro ===
- Climate of Rio de Janeiro
- Environment of Rio de Janeiro
  - Carioca Mosaic

==== Natural geographic features of Rio de Janeiro ====
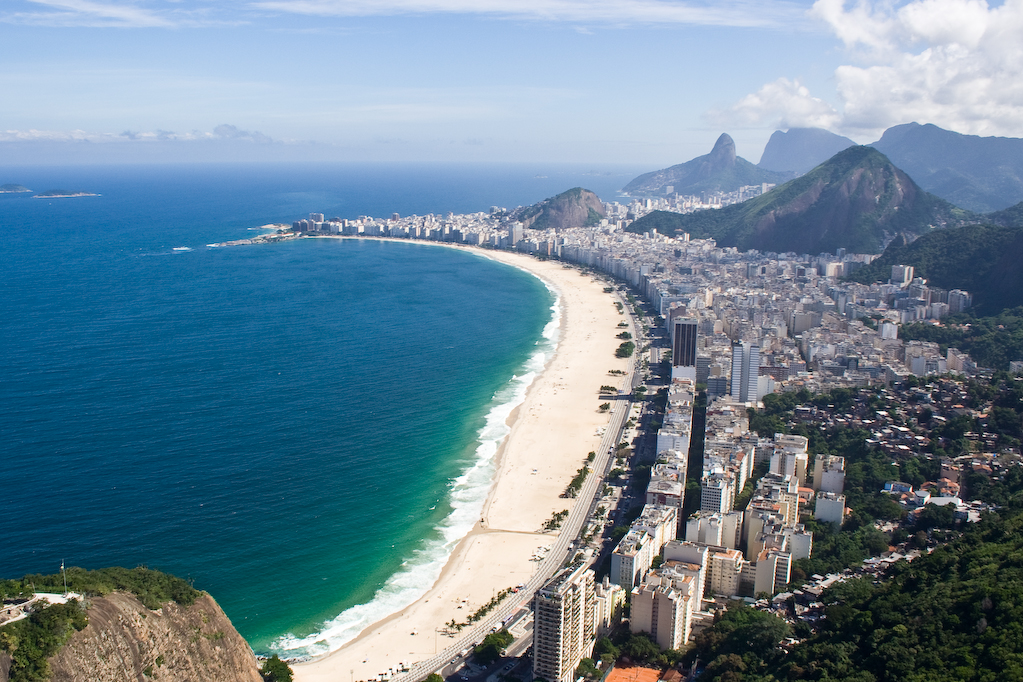
Copacabana Beach

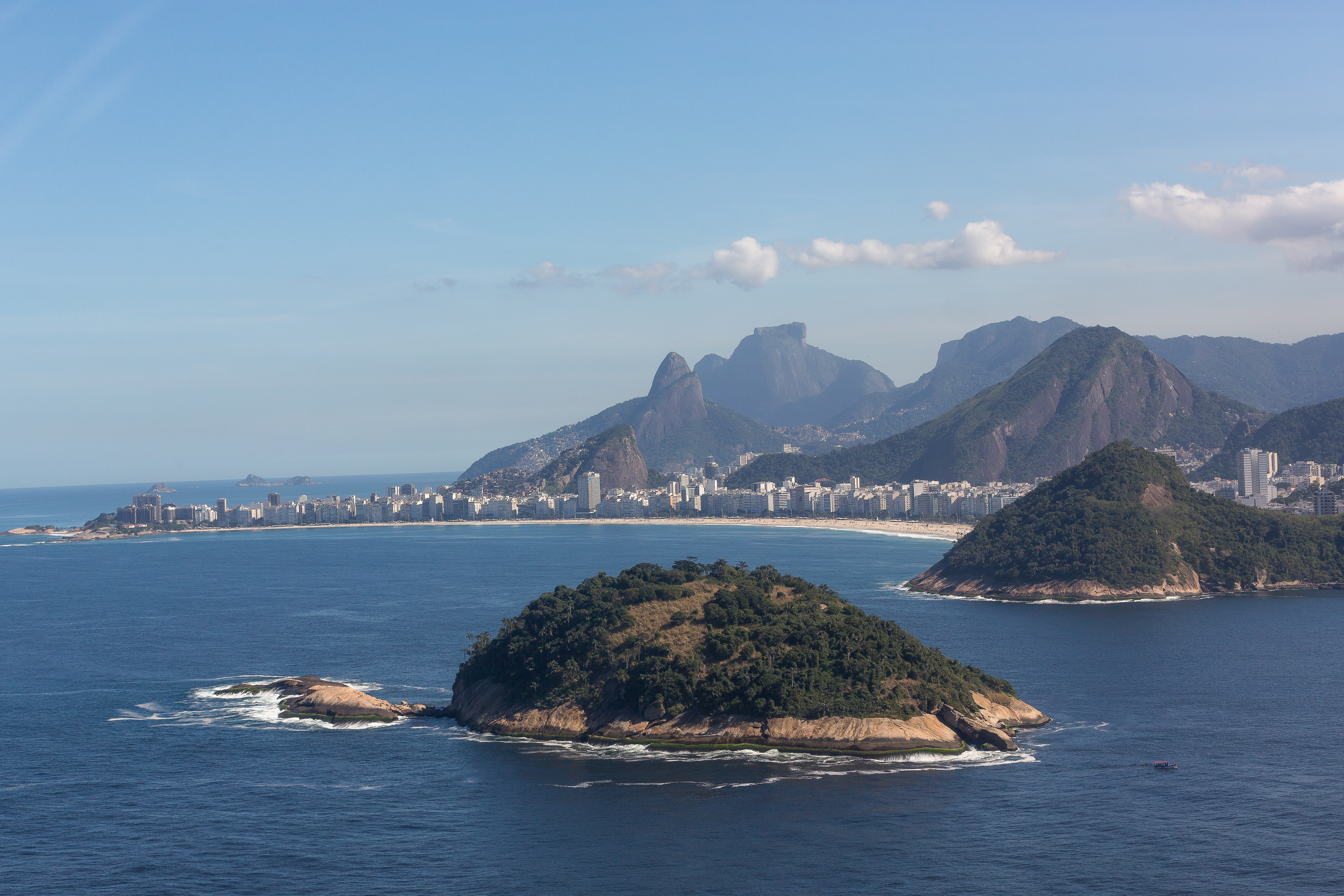
Cotunduba Island

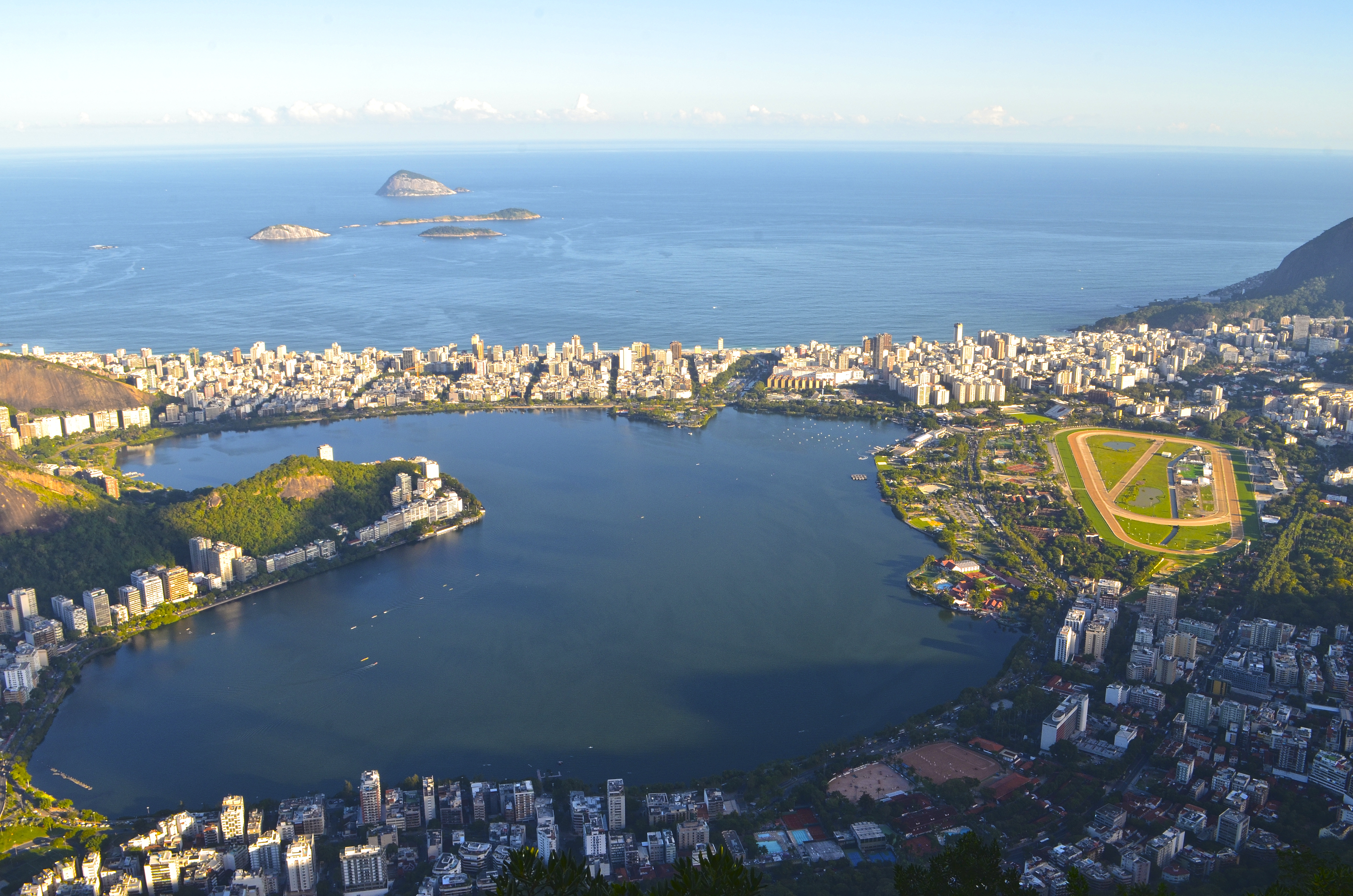
View of Rodrigo de Freitas Lagoon

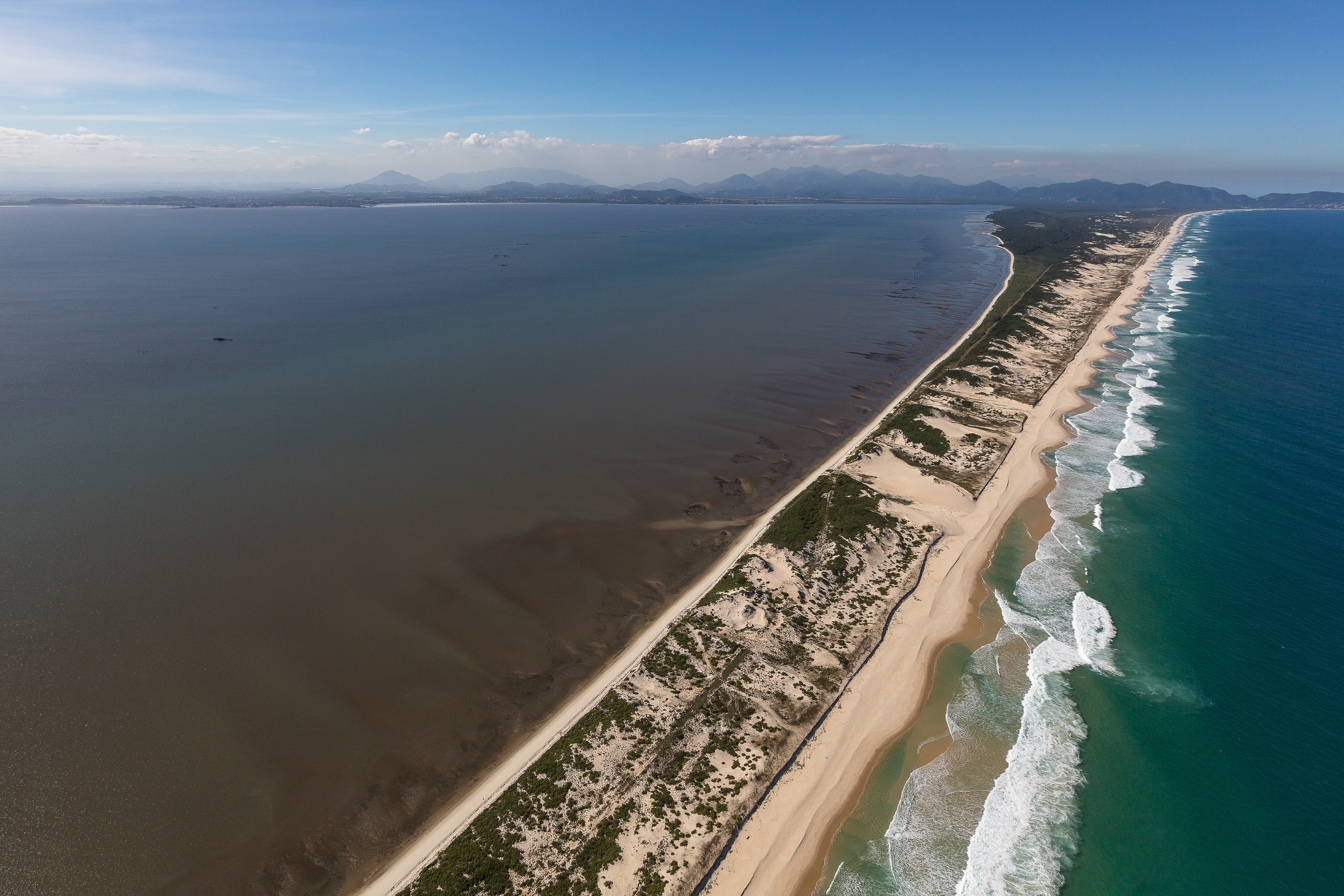
Restinga da Marambaia aerial view

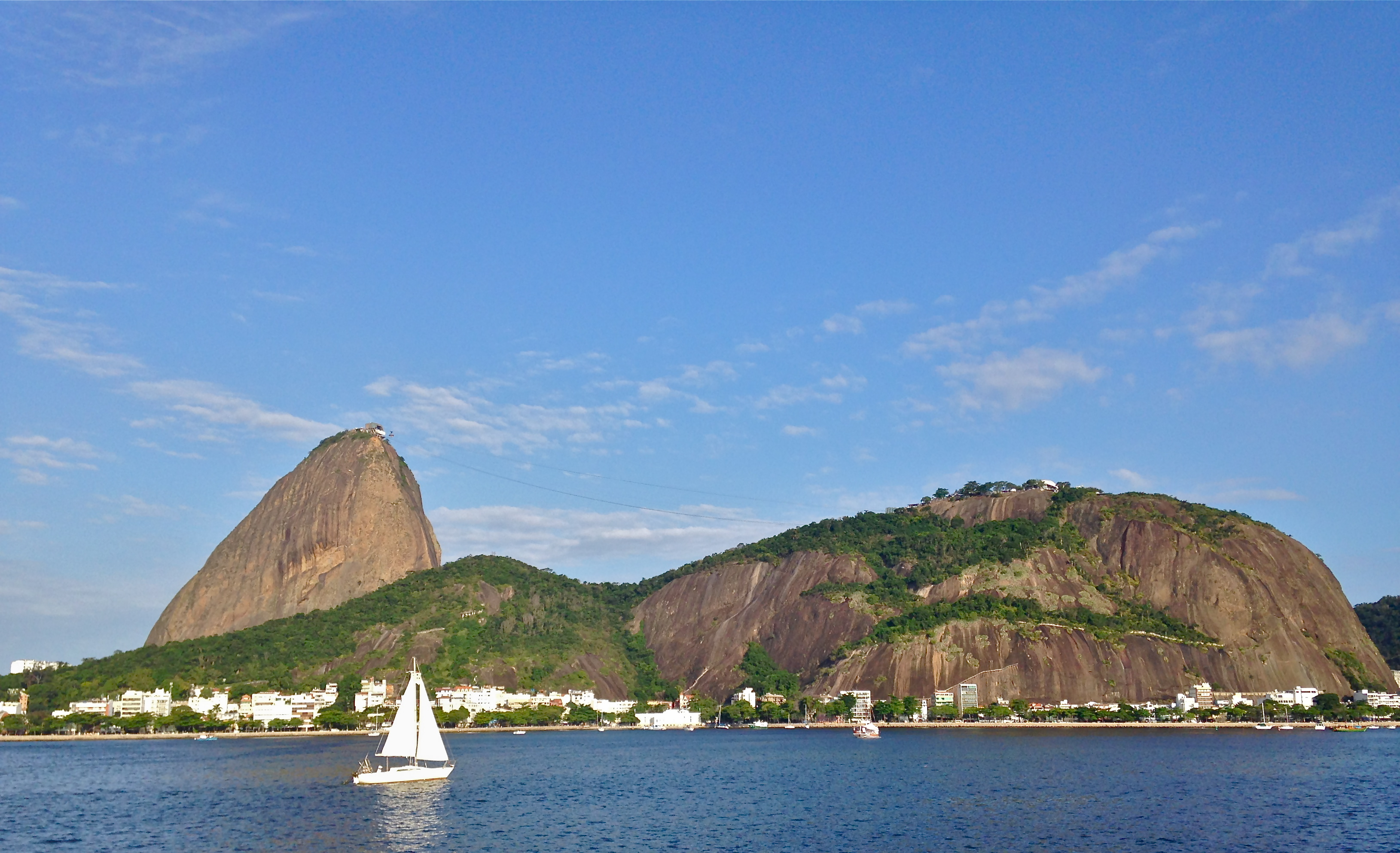
The Sugarloaf Mountain

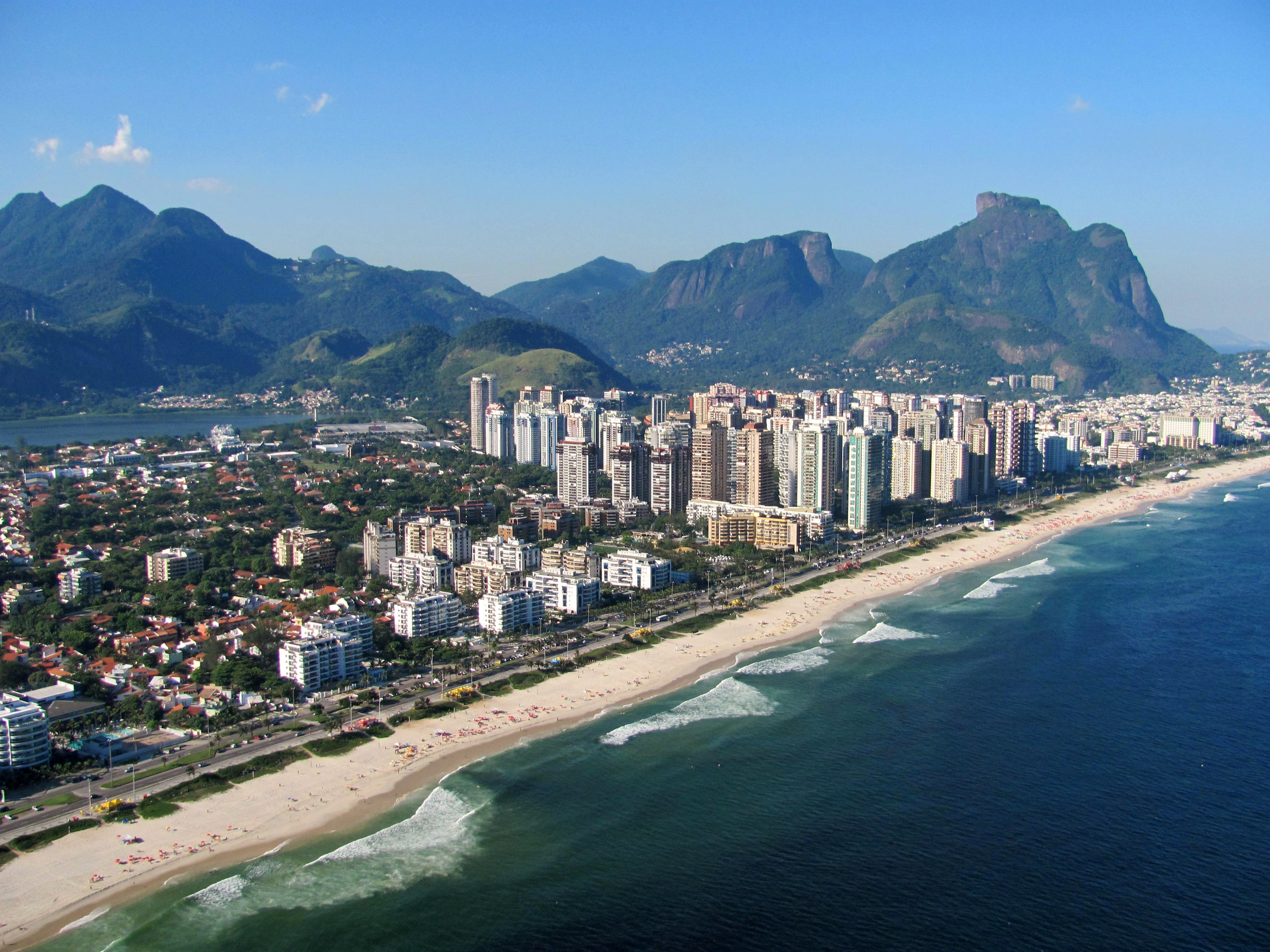
Barra da Tijuca, a neighborhood in the West Zone

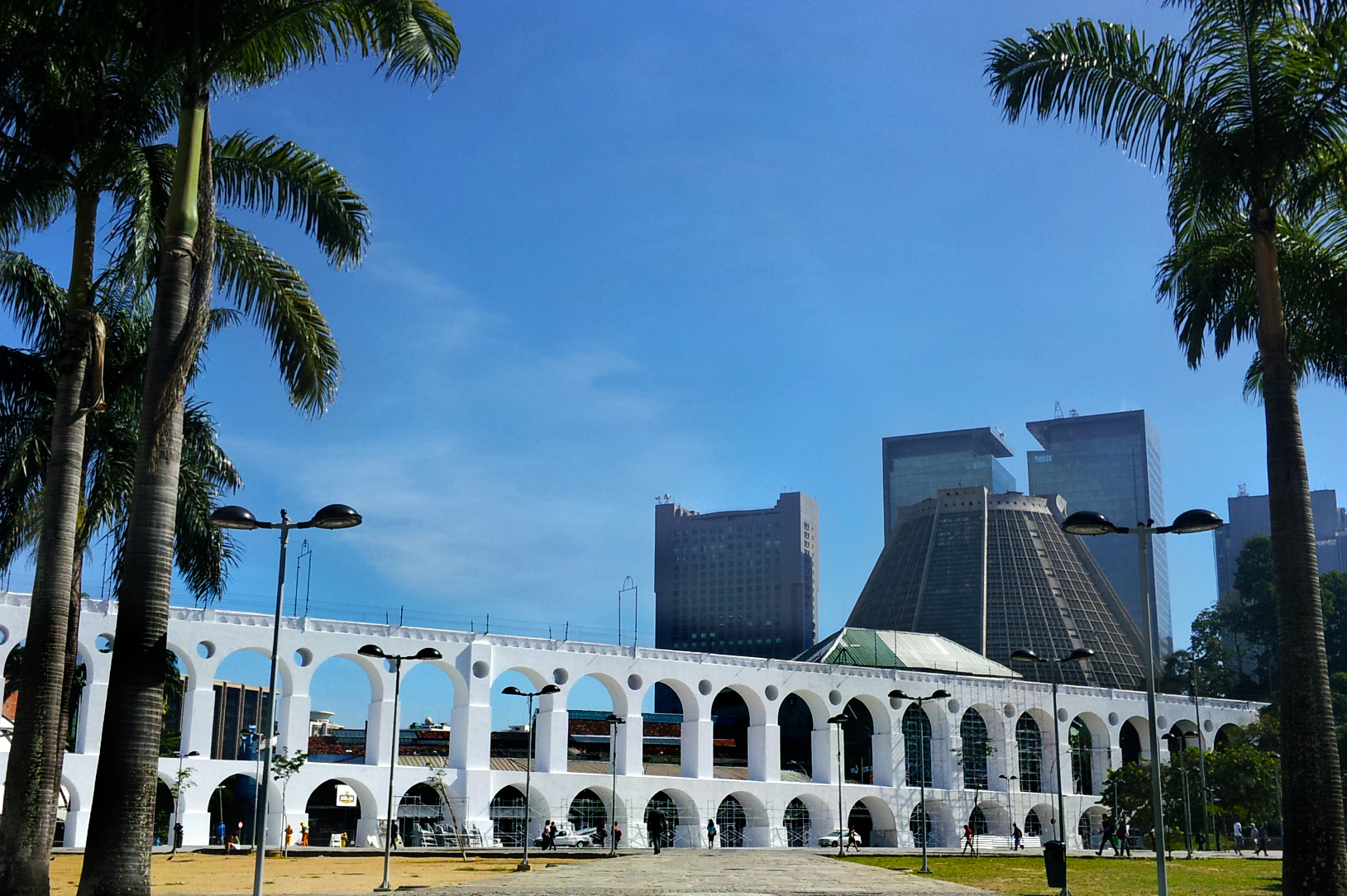
The Carioca Aqueduct

- Beaches in Rio de Janeiro
  - Arpoador
  - Barra da Tijuca
  - Botafogo
  - Copacabana
  - Ipanema
  - Leblon
  - Pontal
  - Praia do Abricó
  - Recreio dos Bandeirantes
- Islands in Rio de Janeiro
  - Governador Island
  - Ilha das Cobras
  - Ilha Fiscal
  - Ilhas Cagarras
  - Paquetá Island
  - Villegagnon Island
- Lagoons in Rio de Janeiro
  - Rodrigo de Freitas Lagoon
- Mountains in Rio de Janeiro
  - Corcovado
  - Pedra da Gávea
  - Sugarloaf Mountain
- Restingas in Rio de Janeiro
  - Restinga da Marambaia
- Rivers in Rio de Janeiro
  - Acari River
  - Carioca River
  - Maracanã River

=== Areas of Rio de Janeiro ===
- North Zone
- South Zone
- West Zone
- Zona Central

==== Neighbourhoods in Rio de Janeiro ====
- Botafogo
- Centro
- Copacabana
- Ipanema
- Leblon

=== Locations in Rio de Janeiro ===
- Tourist attractions in Rio de Janeiro
  - Museums in Rio de Janeiro
  - Shopping areas and markets
  - World Heritage Sites in Rio de Janeiro
    - Valongo Wharf

==== Aqueducts in Rio de Janeiro ====
- Carioca Aqueduct

==== Bridges in Rio de Janeiro ====
- Ponte do Saber
- Rio–Niterói Bridge

==== Cultural and exhibition centres in Rio de Janeiro ====
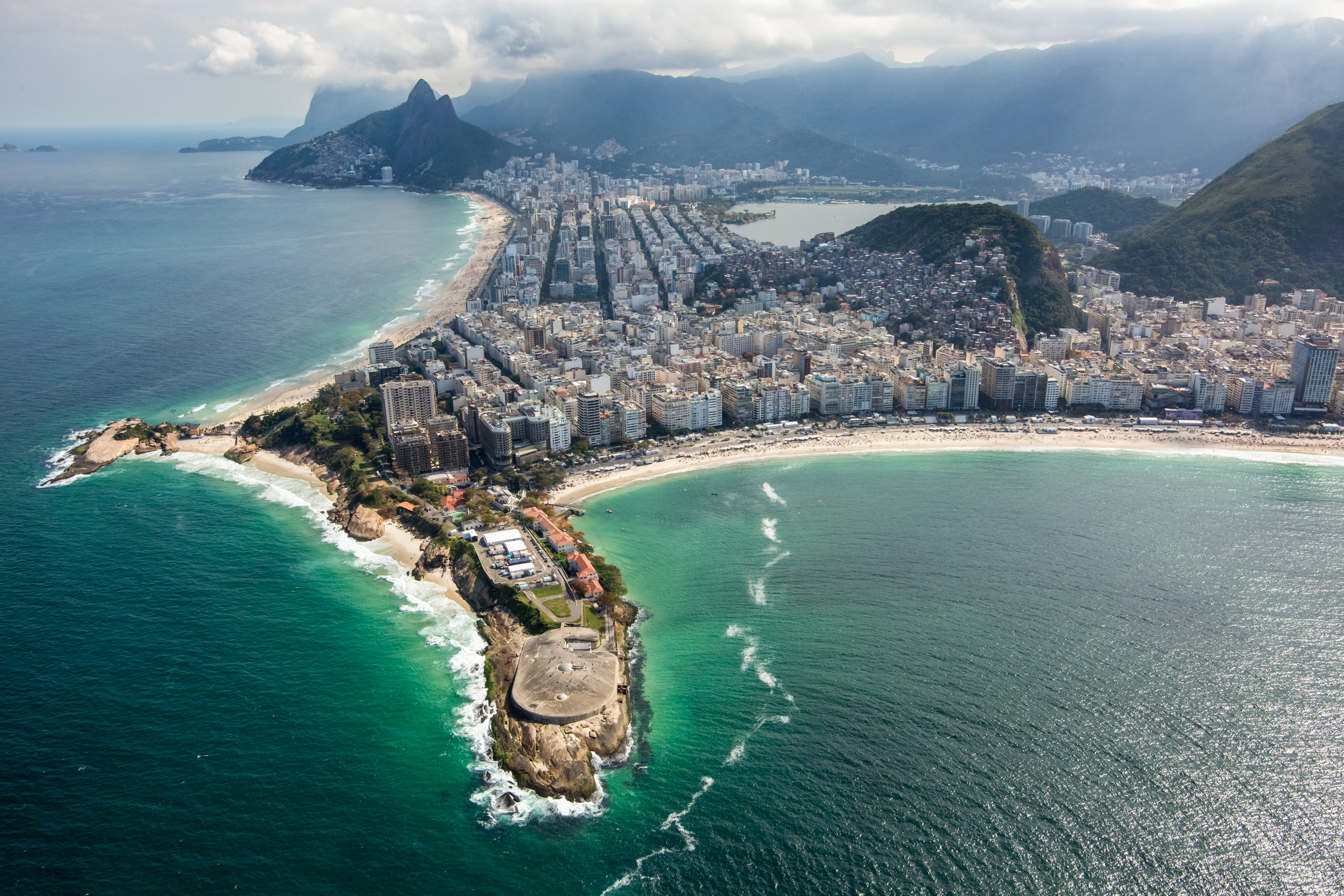
The Fort Copacabana

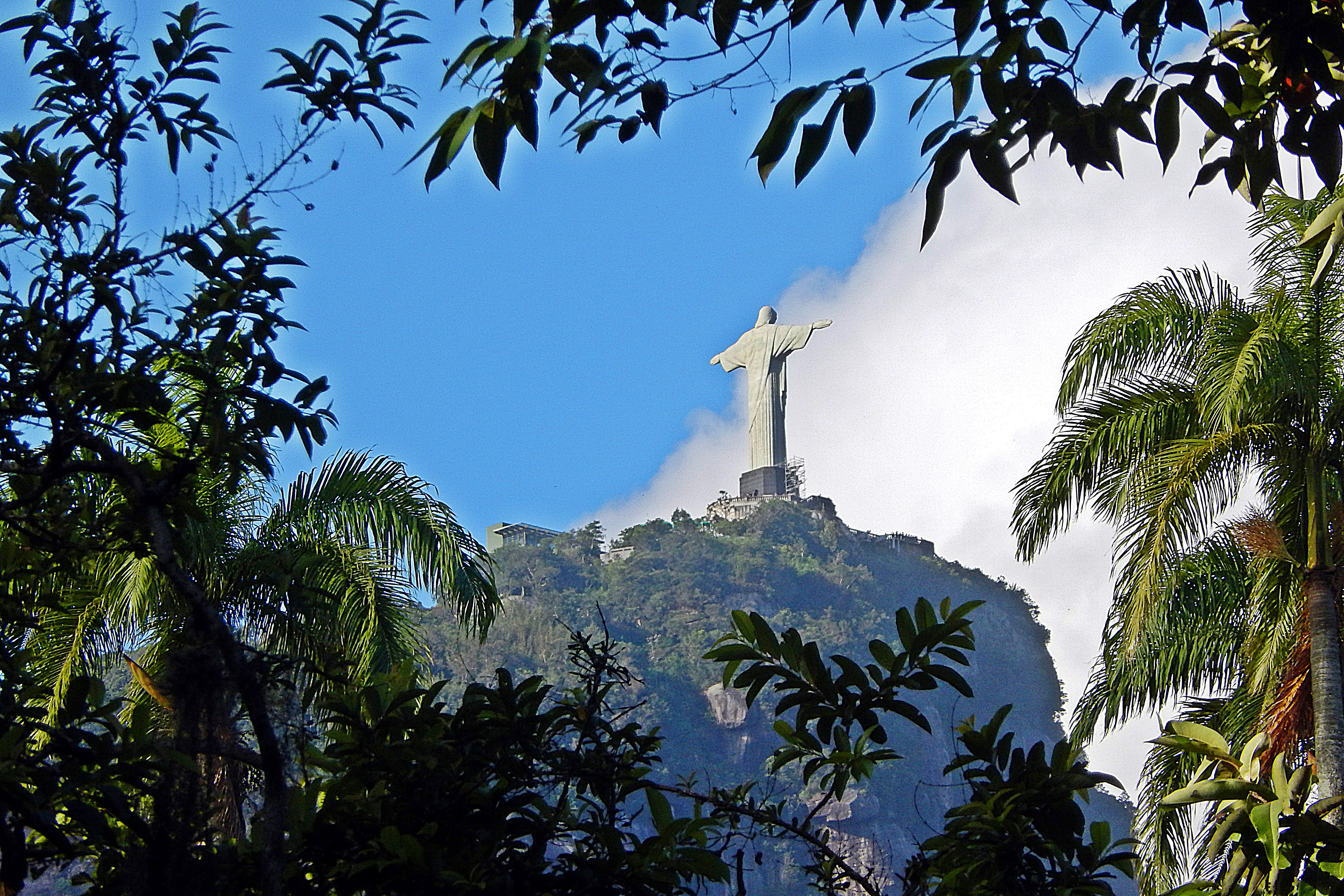
The Christ the Redeemer statue

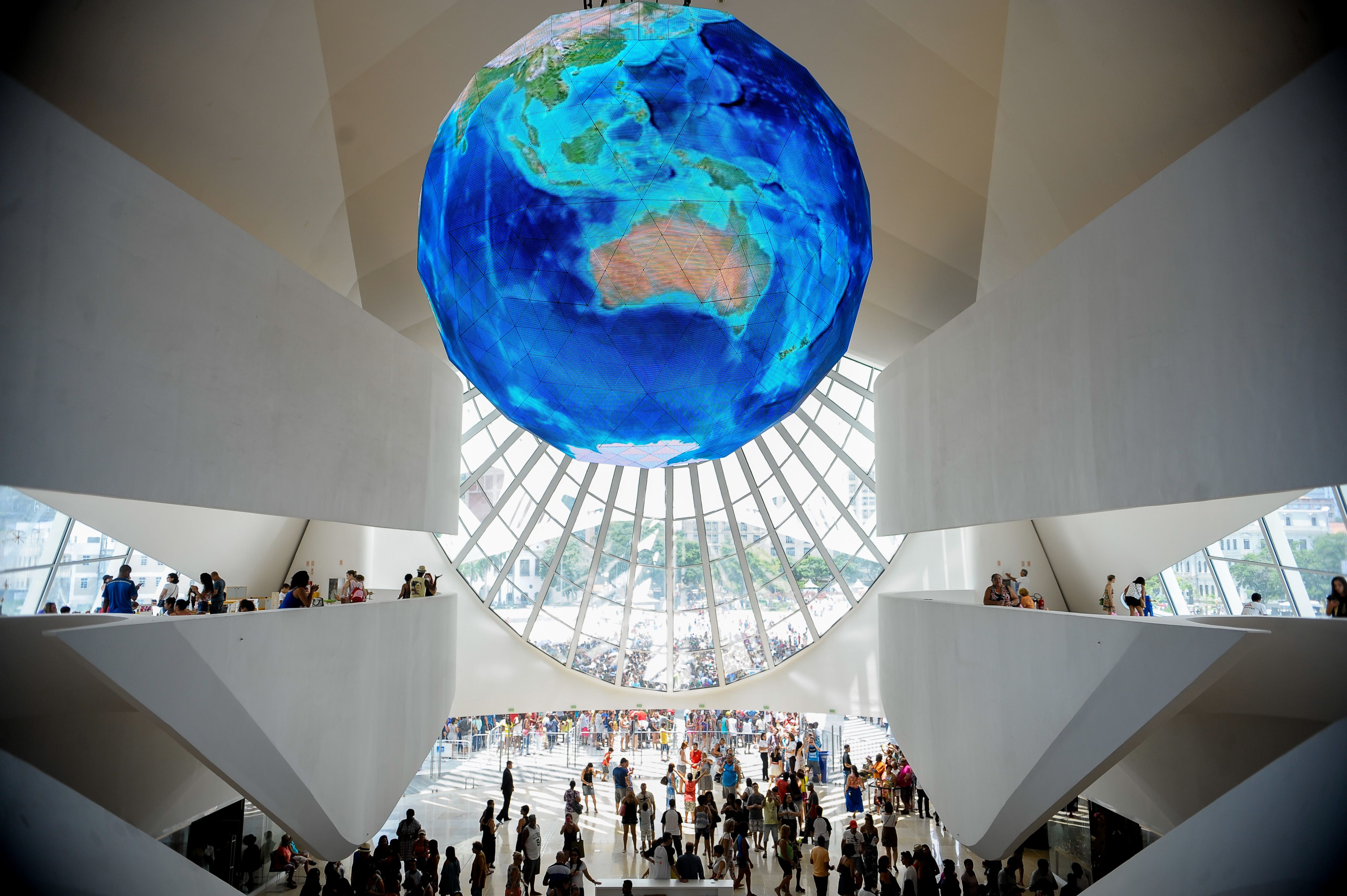
Museum of Tomorrow

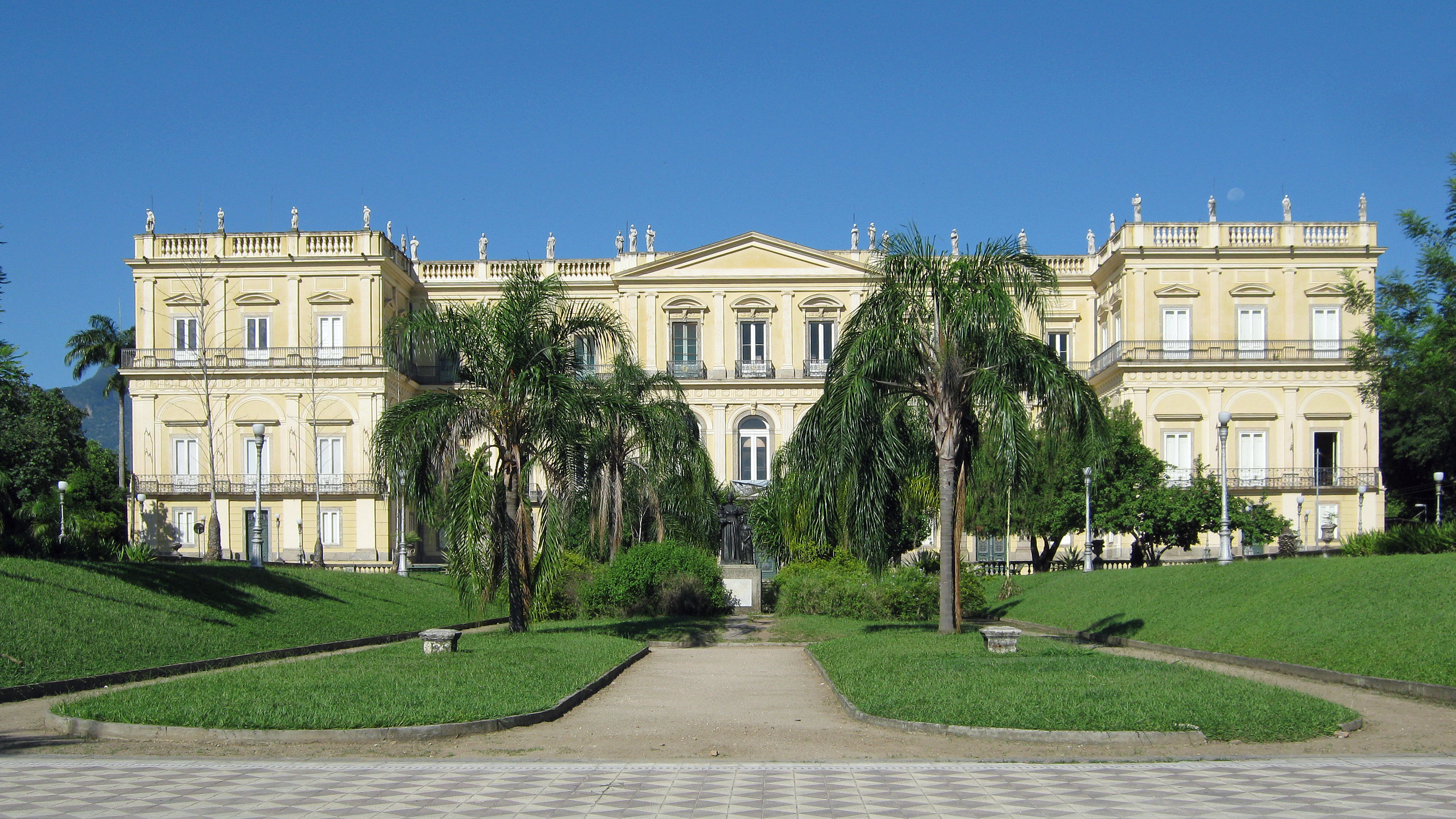
Paço de São Cristóvão

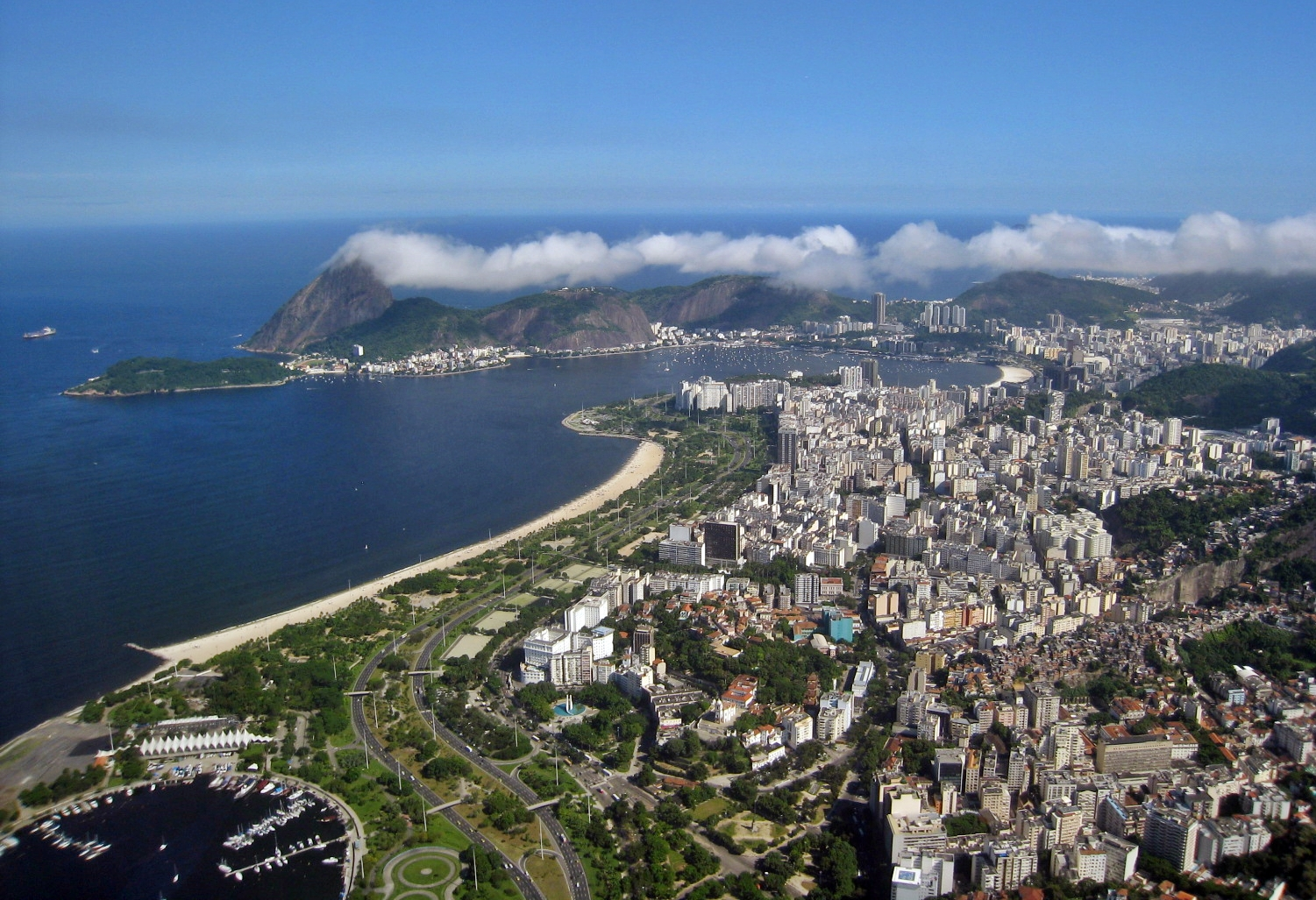
Flamengo Park

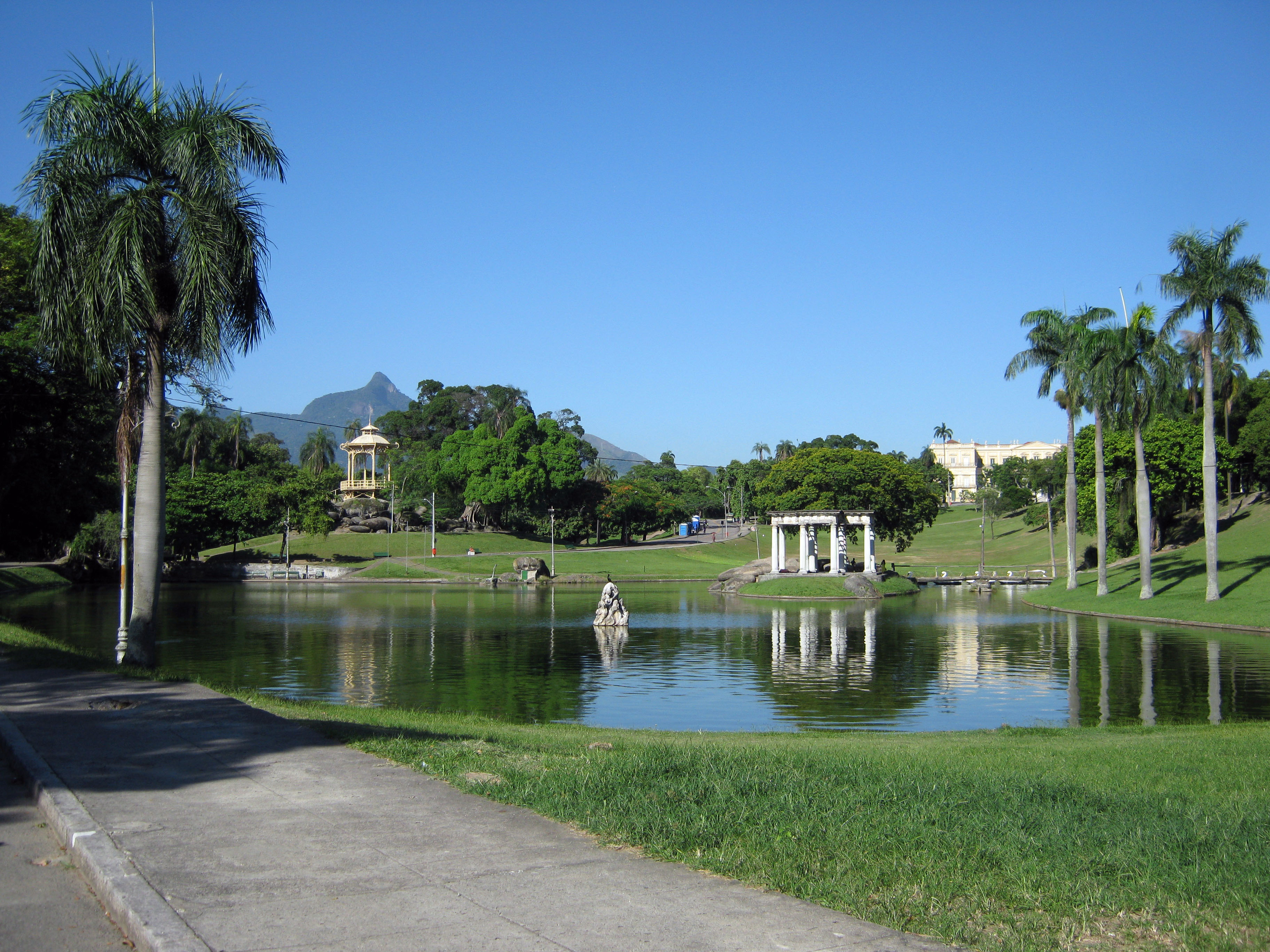
Quinta da Boa Vista

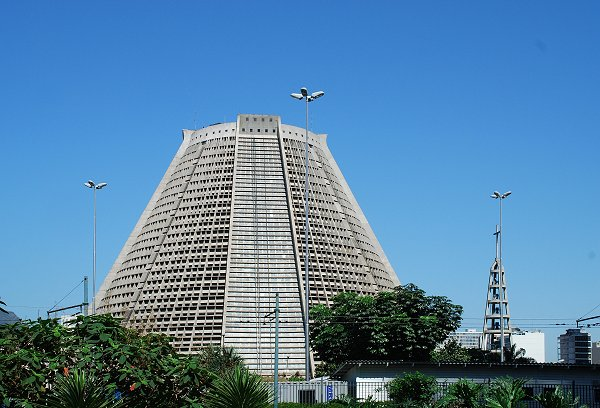
Rio de Janeiro Cathedral

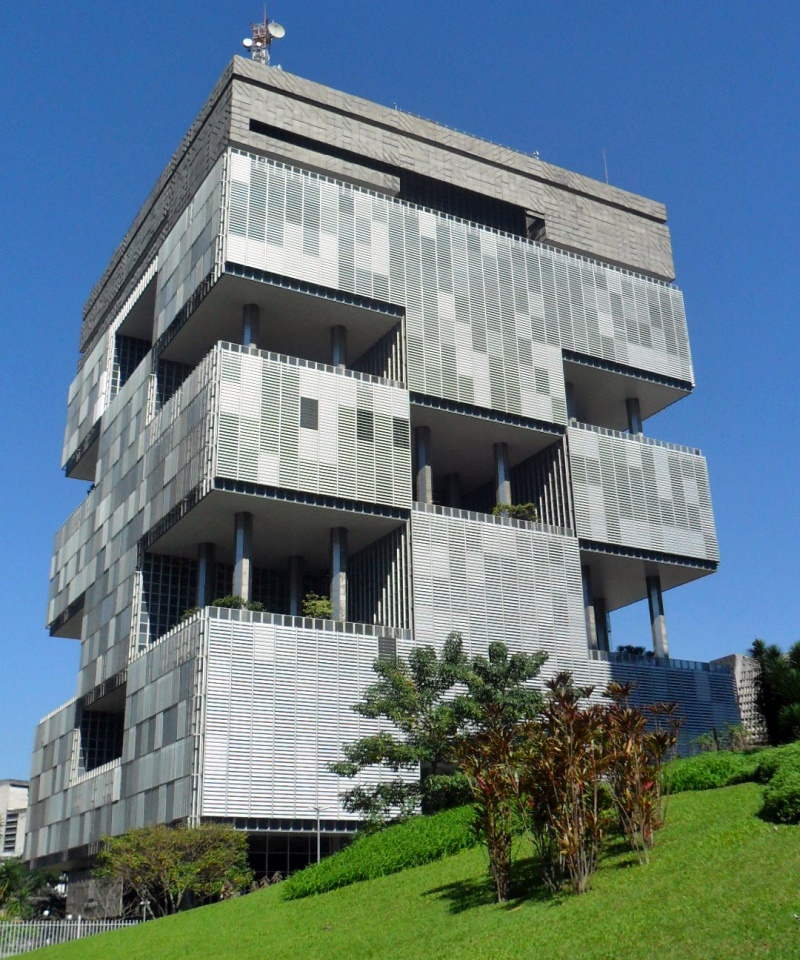
The Petrobras Headquarters

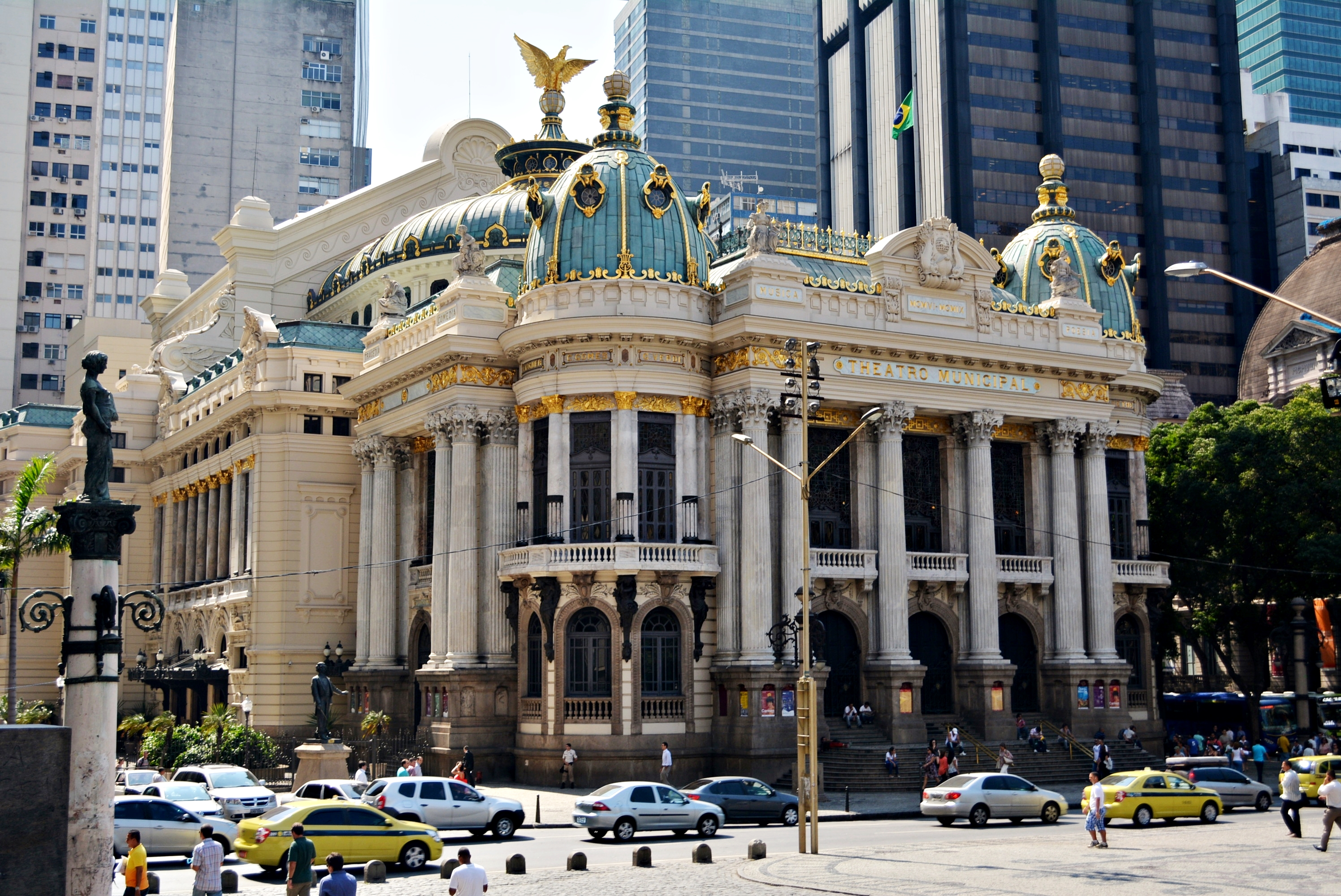
Teatro Municipal

- Riocentro

==== Forts in Rio de Janeiro ====
- Fort Copacabana
- Fortaleza de Nossa Senhora da Conceição
- Fortaleza de São João

==== Monuments and memorials in Rio de Janeiro ====
- Christ the Redeemer
- Monument to the Dead of World War II

==== Museums and art galleries in Rio de Janeiro ====
Museums in Rio de Janeiro

- Civil Police Museum
- Museu Aeroespacial
- Museu da Imagem e do Som do Rio de Janeiro
- Museu Nacional de Belas Artes
- Museum of Life
- Museum of Modern Art
- Museum of Tomorrow
- National Historical Museum
- National Museum of Brazil

==== Palaces and villas in Rio de Janeiro ====
- Catete Palace
- Paço de São Cristóvão
- Paço Imperial
- Palácio Laranjeiras
- Palácio Monroe

==== Parks and gardens in Rio de Janeiro ====
- Campo de Santana
- Flamengo Park
- Marapendi Municipal Nature Park
- Parque das Ruínas
- Parque Lage
- Passeio Público
- Pedra Branca State Park
- Quinta da Boa Vista
- Reserva de Marapendi
- Rio de Janeiro Botanical Garden
- Tijuca Forest

==== Public squares in Rio de Janeiro ====
- Cinelândia
- General Osório Square
- Largo do Boticário
- Largo do Machado
- Praça Quinze de Novembro

==== Religious buildings in Rio de Janeiro ====
- Candelária Church
- Nossa Senhora do Monserrate do Rio de Janeiro
- Old Cathedral of Rio de Janeiro
- Presbyterian Cathedral of Rio de Janeiro
- Rio de Janeiro Cathedral
- Rio de Janeiro Brazil Temple

==== Secular buildings in Rio de Janeiro ====
- Centro Empresarial Internacional Rio
- Edificio do Jornal A Noite
- Gustavo Capanema Palace
- Hanging Garden of Valongo
- National Observatory
- Petrobras Headquarters
- Rio Sul Center
- Torre Almirante
- Valongo Observatory
- Ventura Corporate Towers

==== Streets in Rio de Janeiro ====
- Avenida Atlântica
- Avenida Brasil
- Avenida Presidente Vargas
- Avenida Rio Branco
- Avenida Vieira Souto
- Rua General Urquiza
- Rua Tonelero
- Rua Uruguaiana

==== Theatres in Rio de Janeiro ====
- Teatro Carlos Gomes
- Teatro dos Sete
- Teatro João Caetano
- Teatro Villa-Lobos
- Theatro Municipal

=== Demographics of Rio de Janeiro ===
Demographics of Rio de Janeiro

== Government and politics of Rio de Janeiro ==
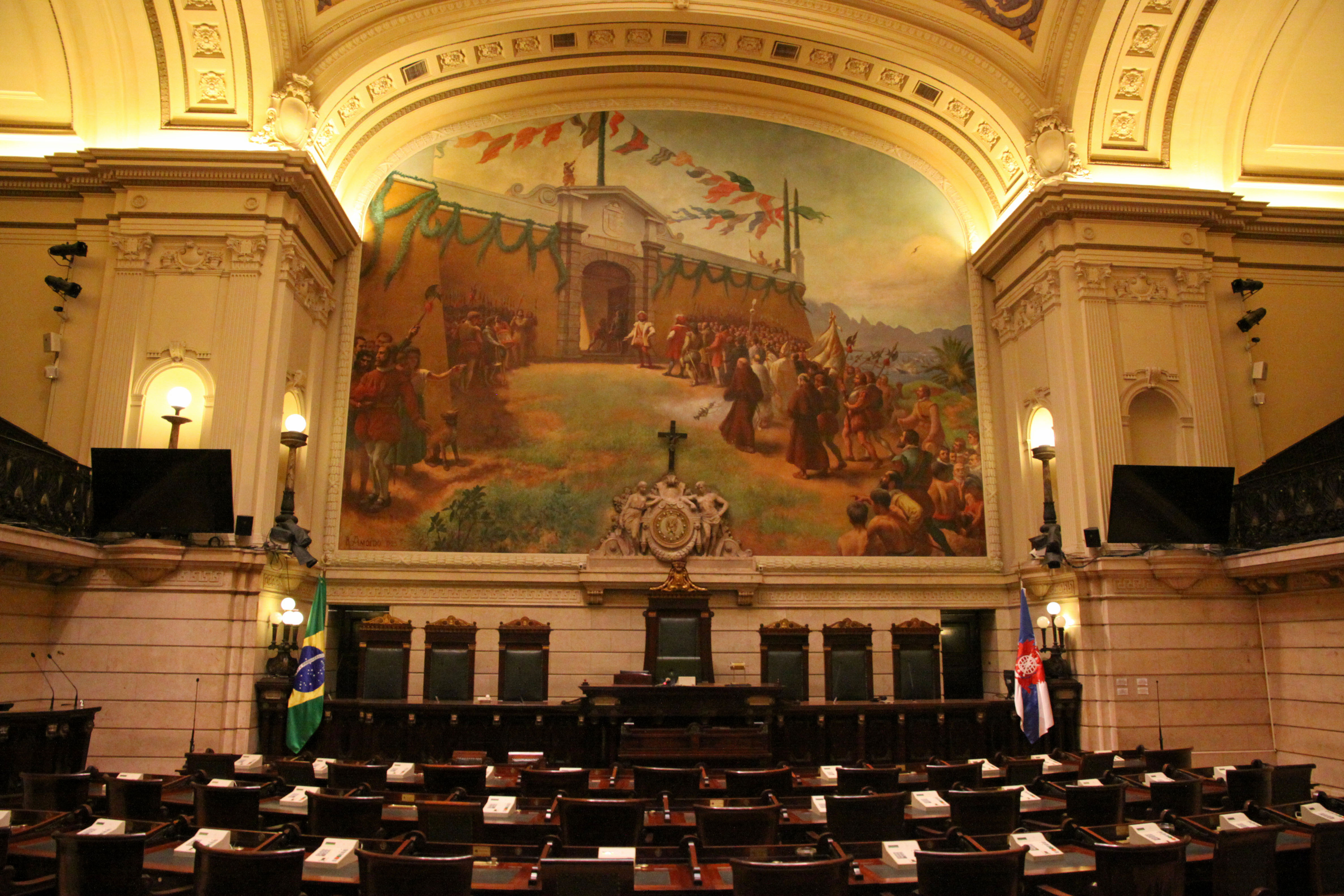
Pedro Ernesto Palace, the seat of the Municipal Chamber of Rio de Janeiro

Politics of Rio de Janeiro

- Administrative Regions in Rio de Janeiro
- Mayors of Rio de Janeiro
- Municipal Chamber of Rio de Janeiro
- International relations of Rio de Janeiro
  - Twin towns and sister cities of Rio de Janeiro

=== Law and order in Rio de Janeiro ===
- Law enforcement in Rio de Janeiro
  - Civil Police of Rio de Janeiro State
  - Military Police of Rio de Janeiro State

== History of Rio de Janeiro ==
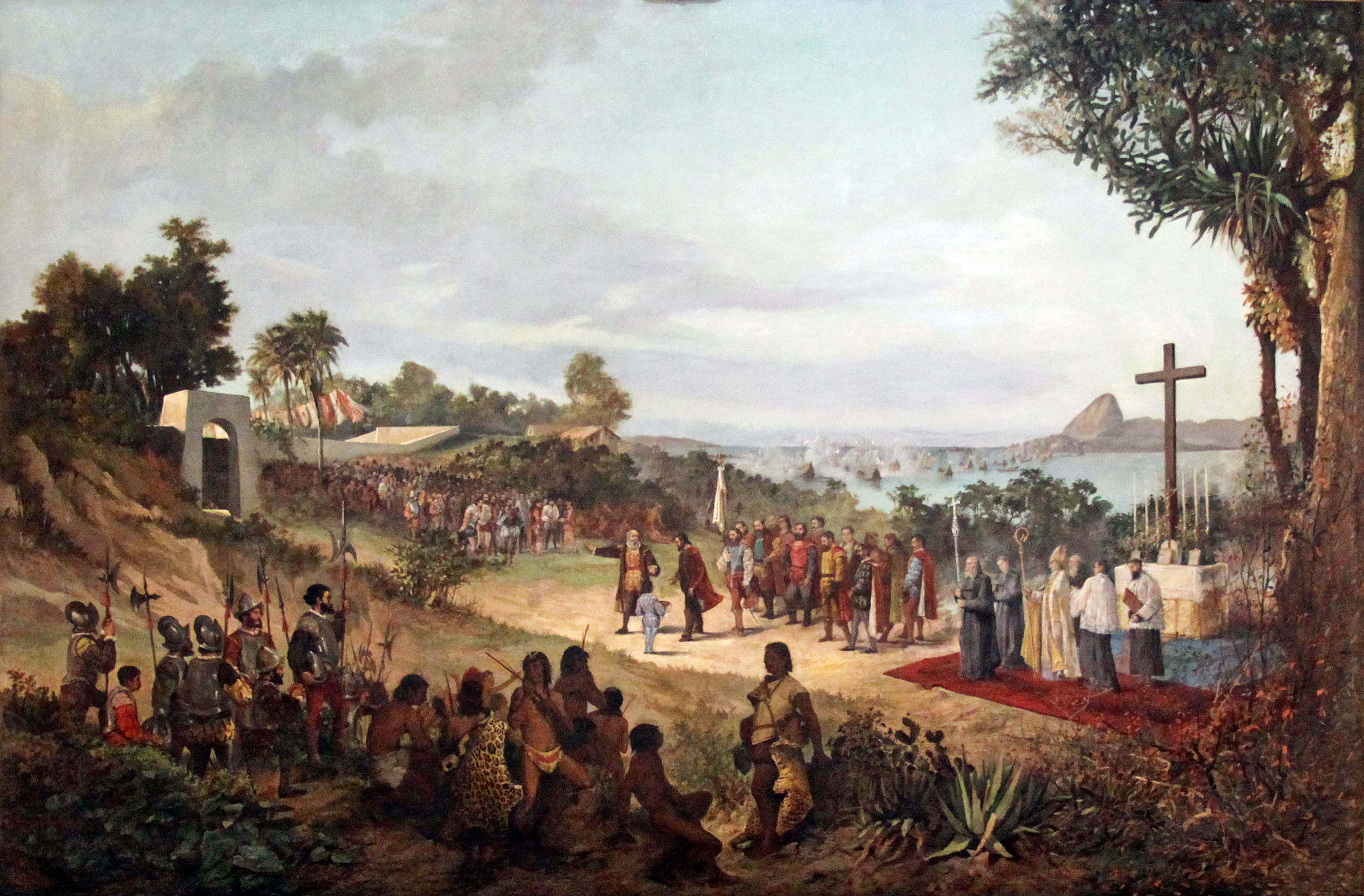
Founding of Rio de Janeiro in 1565. Painting by Antônio Firmino Monteiro

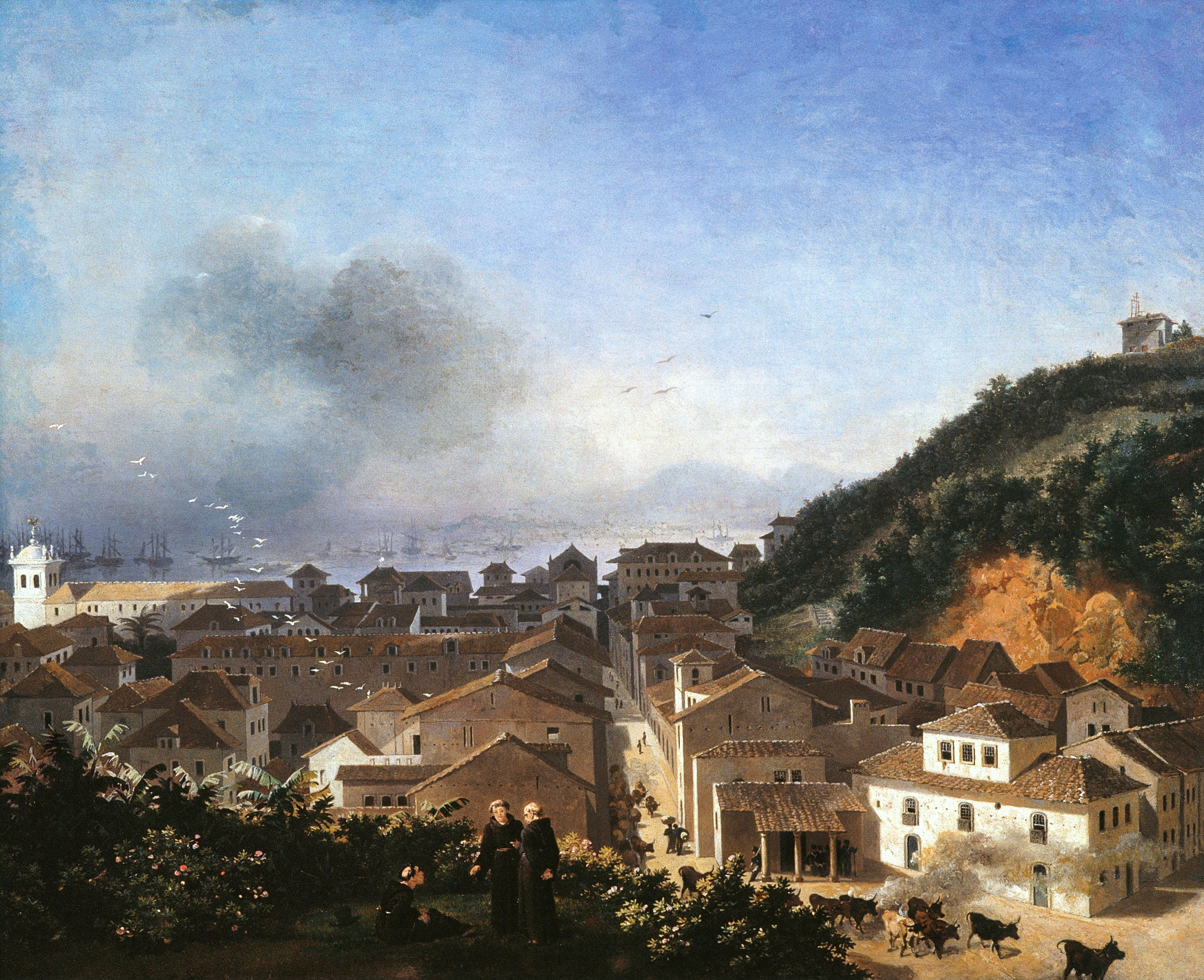
Rio de Janeiro in 1816. Carioca Square, Rio de Janeiro by Nicolas-Antoine Taunay. Museu Nacional de Belas Artes

History of Rio de Janeiro

=== History of Rio de Janeiro, by period or event ===
Timeline of Rio de Janeiro

- Rio de Janeiro during the Portuguese Empire (1565–1815)
  - São Sebastião do Rio de Janeiro founded by the Portuguese (1 March 1565)
  - The colonial capital in Portuguese America is transferred to Rio de Janeiro from Salvador (27 January 1763)
  - The city becomes capital of Kingdom of Portugal (1808)
- Rio de Janeiro during the United Kingdom of PBA (1815–1822)
  - Rio becomes capital of the United Kingdom of Portugal, Brazil and the Algarves (1815)
- Rio de Janeiro during the Empire of Brazil (1822–1889)
  - After the declaration of Brazil's independence in 1822, Rio de Janeiro becomes the capital of the new empire (1822–1889)
- Rio de Janeiro during the Republican period (1889–present)
  - The city becomes capital of the republic of Brazil (1889)
  - The Brazilian capital is officially moved to Brasília (21 April 1960)
  - A presidential decree removes the city's federative status and merges it with the State of Rio de Janeiro, with the city of Rio de Janeiro replacing Niterói as the state's capital, and establishing the Rio de Janeiro Metropolitan Region (1975)

=== History of Rio de Janeiro, by subject ===
- Battle of Rio de Janeiro (1567)
- Battle of Rio de Janeiro (1711)
- Treaty of Rio de Janeiro (1825)
- Proclamation of the Republic (1889)

== Culture of Rio de Janeiro ==
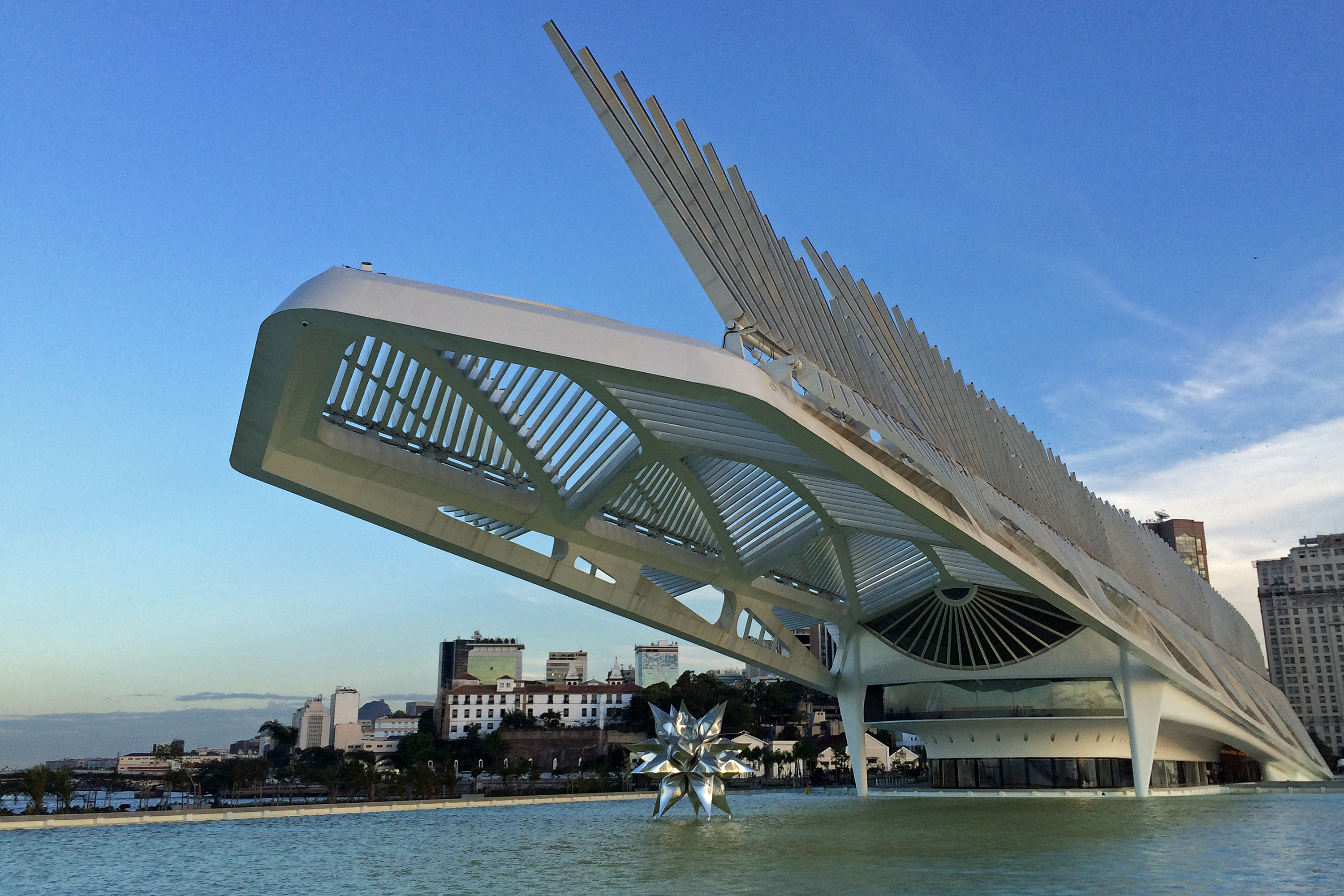
Museum of Tomorrow, a building designed to adapt to changing environmental conditions

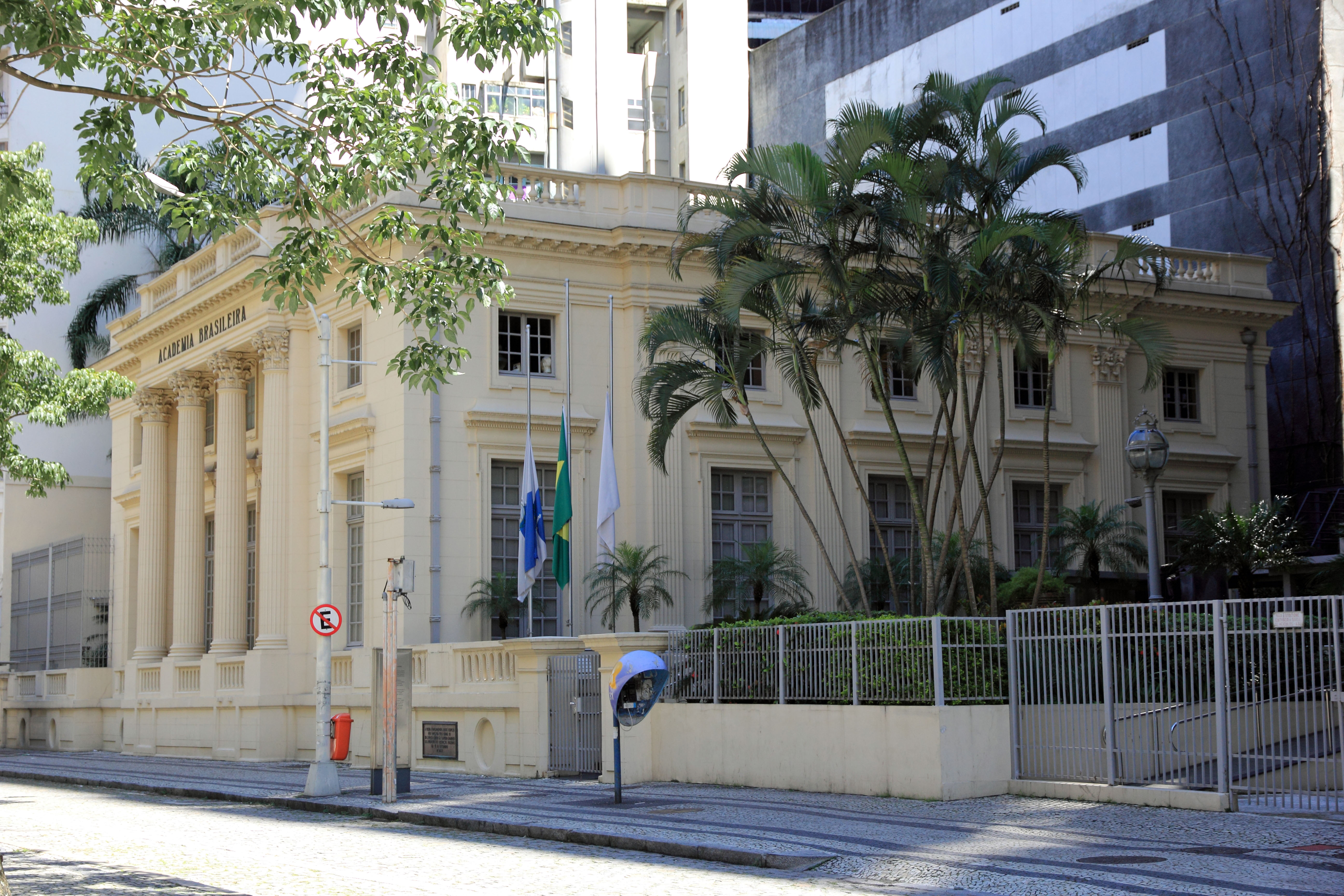
Academia Brasileira de Letras, in charge of Brazilian literary arts

Culture of Rio de Janeiro

=== Arts in Rio de Janeiro ===
==== Architecture of Rio de Janeiro ====
Architecture in Rio de Janeiro

- Buildings in Rio de Janeiro
  - Tallest buildings in Rio de Janeiro

==== Cinema of Rio de Janeiro ====
- Rio de Janeiro International Film Festival

==== Literature of Rio de Janeiro ====
Literature in Rio de Janeiro

- Writers from Rio de Janeiro
  - Machado de Assis
  - Paulo Coelho

==== Music of Rio de Janeiro ====
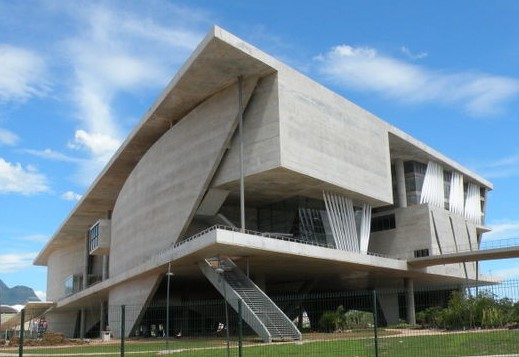
The Cidade das Artes concert hall

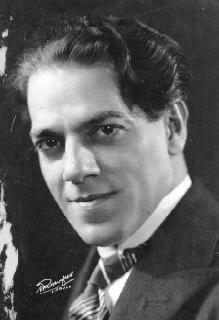
Heitor Villa-Lobos, born in Rio de Janeiro in 1887

Music of Rio de Janeiro

- Music festivals and competitions in Rio de Janeiro
  - Rock in Rio
- Music venues in Rio de Janeiro
  - Cidade das Artes
  - KM de Vantagens Hall
  - Theatro Municipal
- Musical ensembles in Rio de Janeiro
  - Orquestra Sinfônica Brasileira
- Musicians from Rio de Janeiro
  - Oscar Lorenzo Fernández
  - Heitor Villa-Lobos
- Songs about Rio de Janeiro
  - Cidade Maravilhosa
- Dance from Rio de Janeiro
  - Maxixe

==== Theatre of Rio de Janeiro ====
Theatre in Rio de Janeiro

==== Visual arts of Rio de Janeiro ====
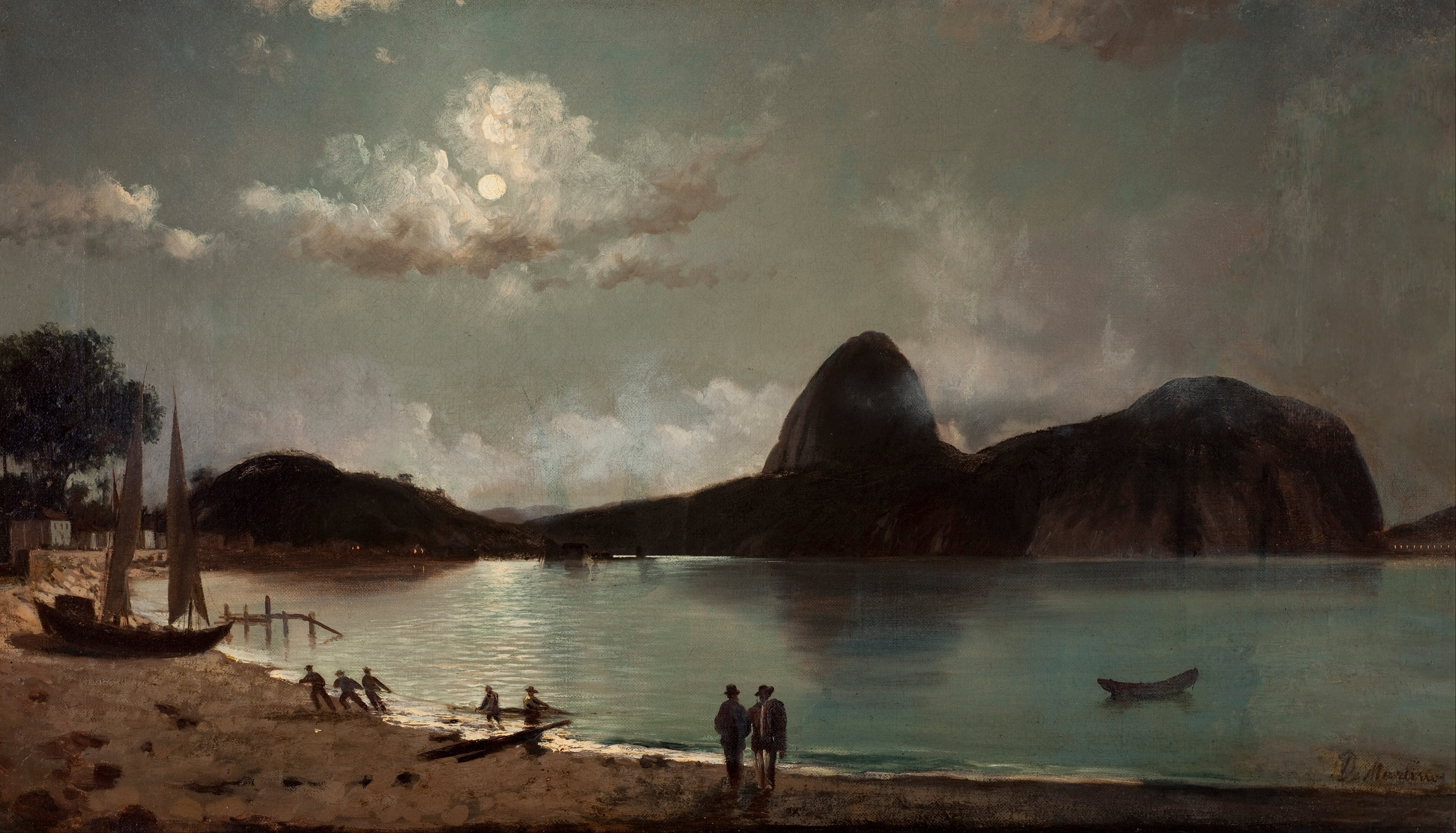
Botafogo Beach (ca. 1870) by Edoardo De Martino. Pinacoteca do Estado de São Paulo

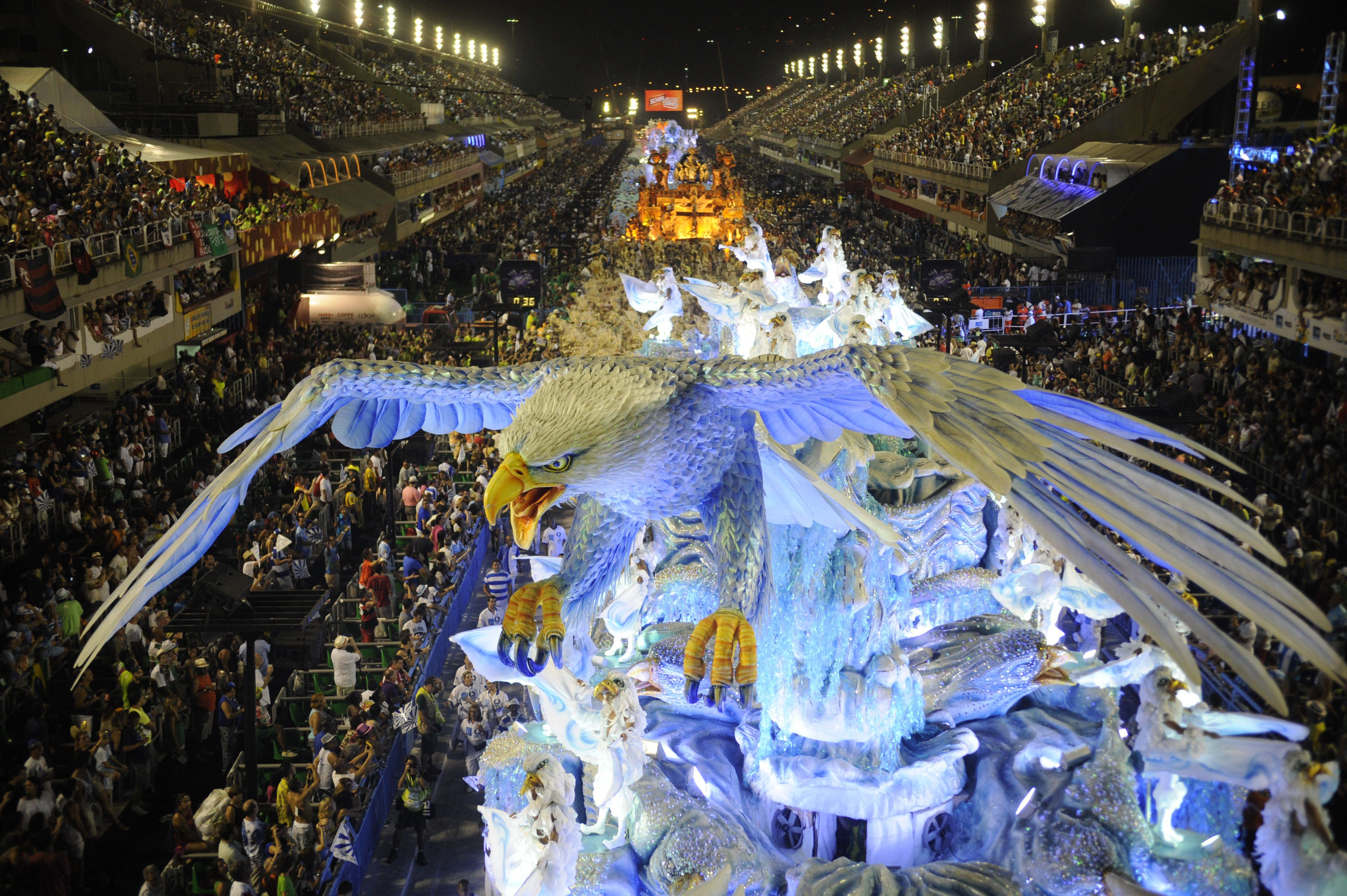
A float at Rio Carnival, 2014

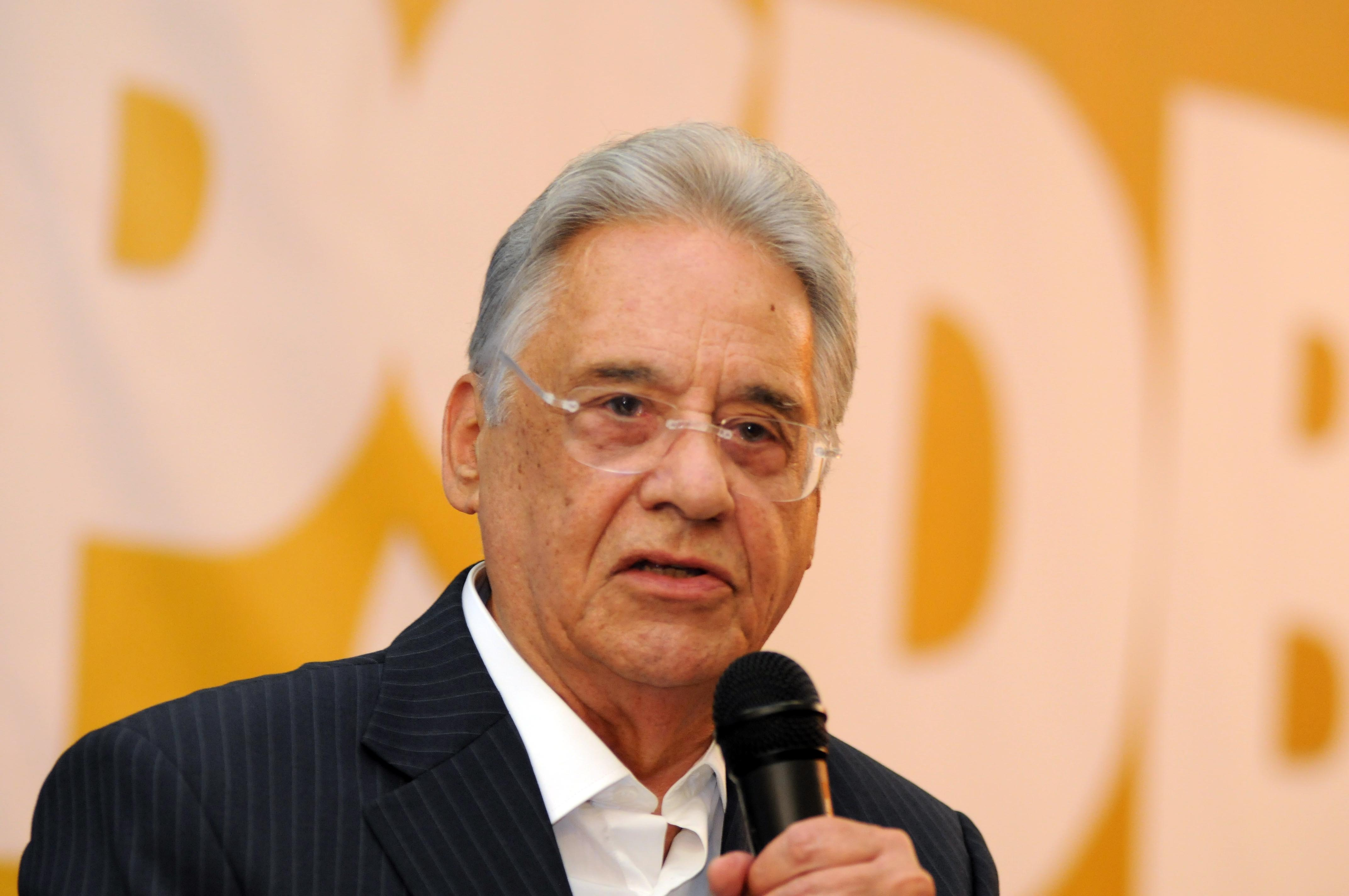
Fernando Henrique Cardoso, sociologist and politician who served as the 34th President of Brazil, born in 1931 in Rio de Janeiro

Rio de Janeiro in art / Paintings of Rio de Janeiro

Art in Rio de Janeiro

- Imperial Academy of Fine Arts
- Escola Nacional de Belas Artes
- Public art in Rio de Janeiro
  - Looking Into My Dreams, Awilda

Events in Rio de Janeiro

- Rio Fashion Week

Festivals in Rio de Janeiro

  - Brazilian Carnival
  - Rio Carnival

Languages of Rio de Janeiro

- Brazilian Portuguese
  - Carioca

Media in Rio de Janeiro

- Newspapers in Rio de Janeiro
  - O Dia
  - O Globo
- Radio and television in Rio de Janeiro
  - Rede Globo

People from Rio de Janeiro

- People from Rio de Janeiro
  - Fernando Henrique Cardoso
  - Paulo Coelho
  - Oscar Niemeyer
  - Nelson Piquet
  - Ronaldo

=== Religion in Rio de Janeiro ===
Religion in Rio de Janeiro

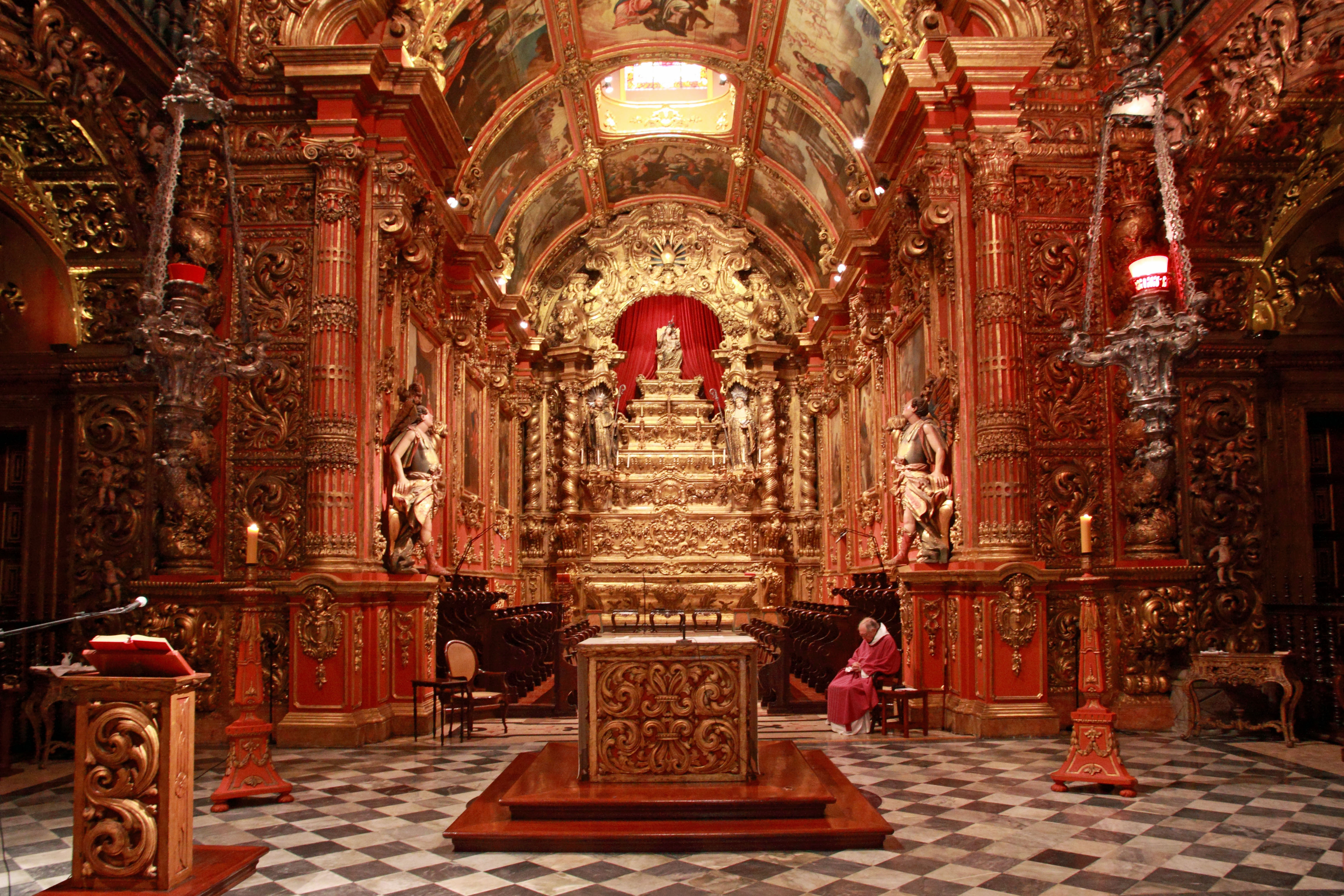
Interior of the Nossa Senhora do Monserrate do Rio de Janeiro, a Benedictine abbey founded in 1590

Religion	Percentage	Number
Catholic	51.09%	3,229,192
Protestant	23.37%	1,477,021
Irreligious	13.59%	858,704
Spiritist	5.90%	372,851
Umbanda and Candomblé	1.29%	72,946
Jewish	0.34%	21,800
Source: IBGE 2010.

=== Sports in Rio de Janeiro ===
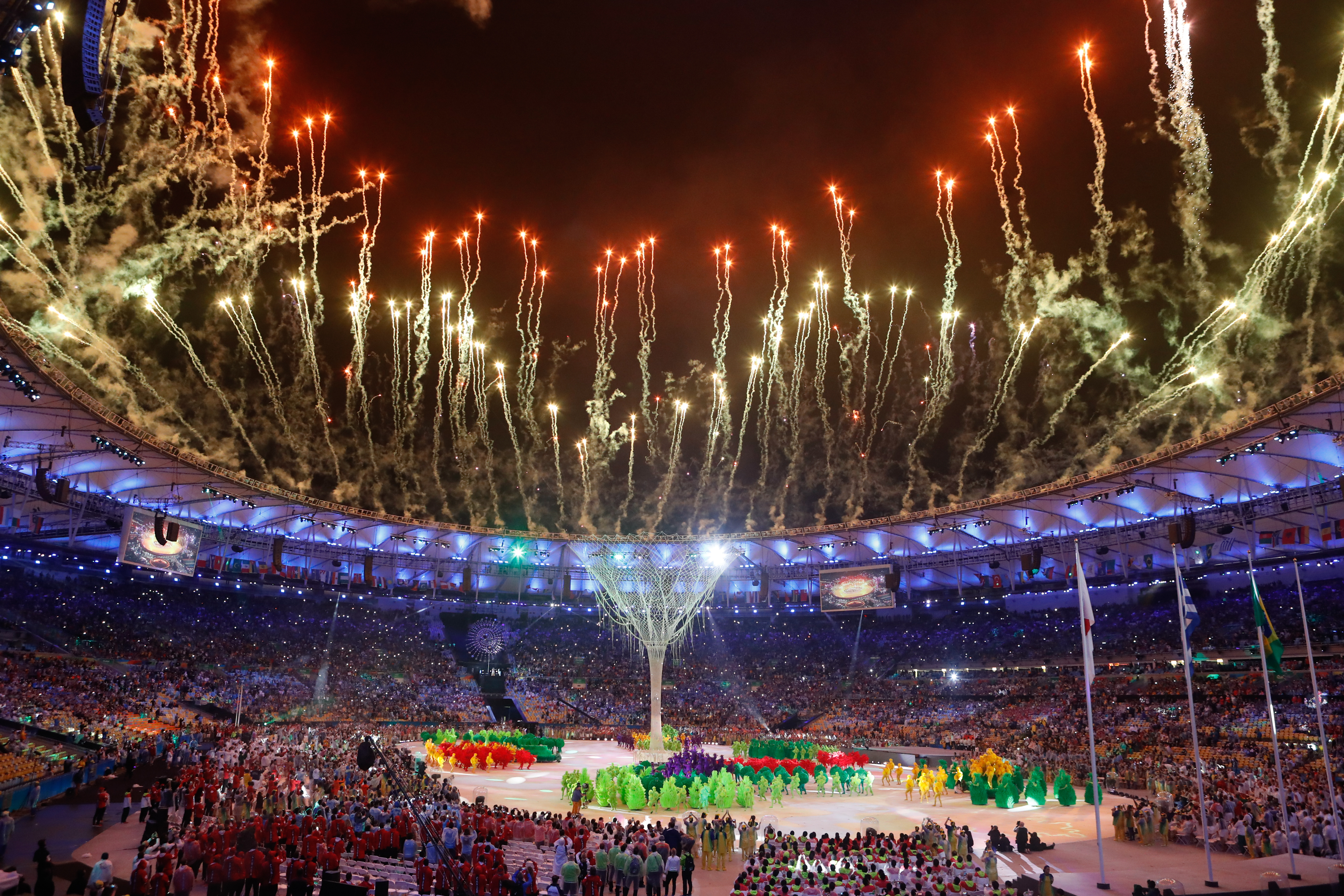
2016 Summer Olympics closing ceremony held on 21 August 2016 at the Maracanã Stadium

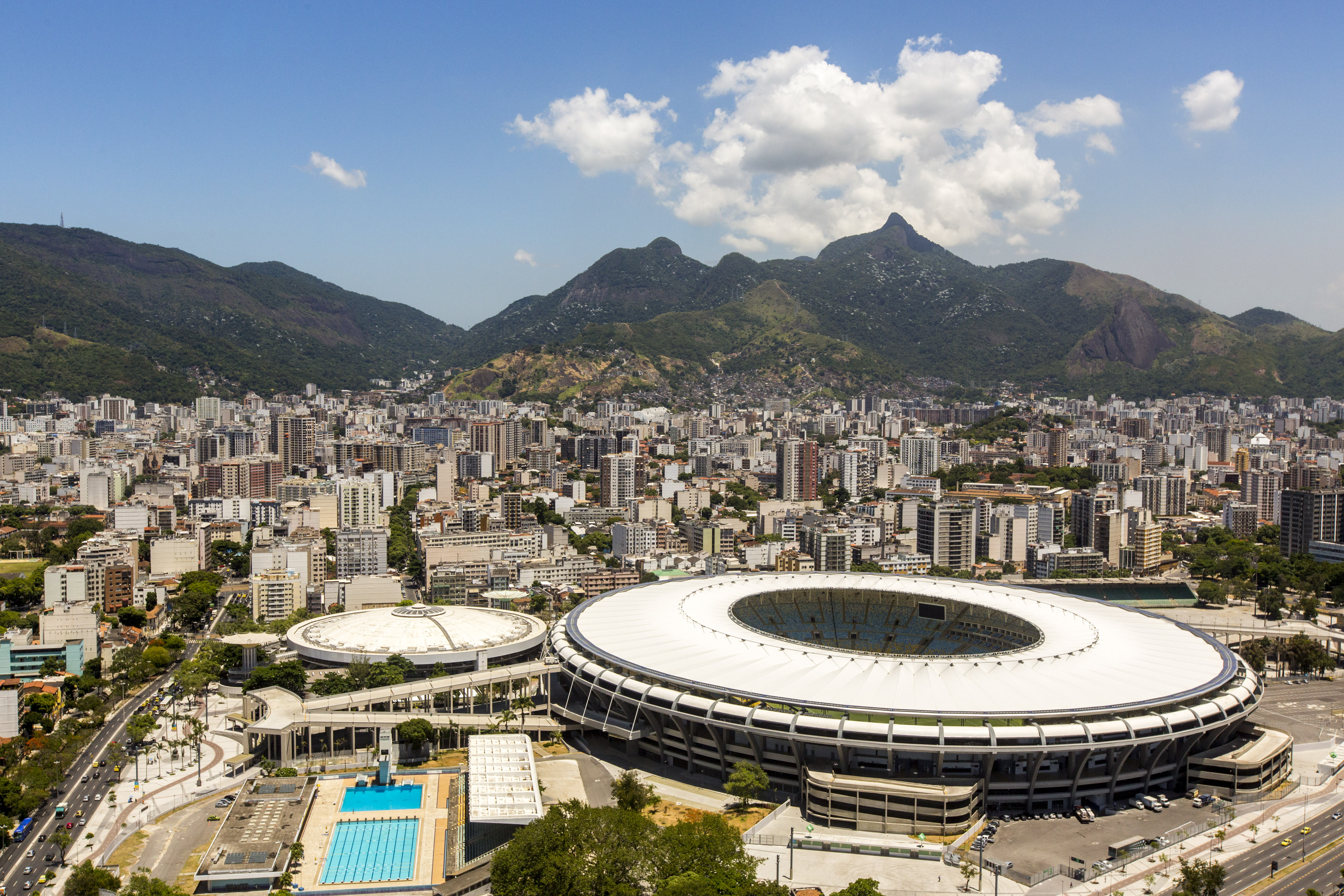
The Maracanã Stadium, the world's largest stadium by capacity

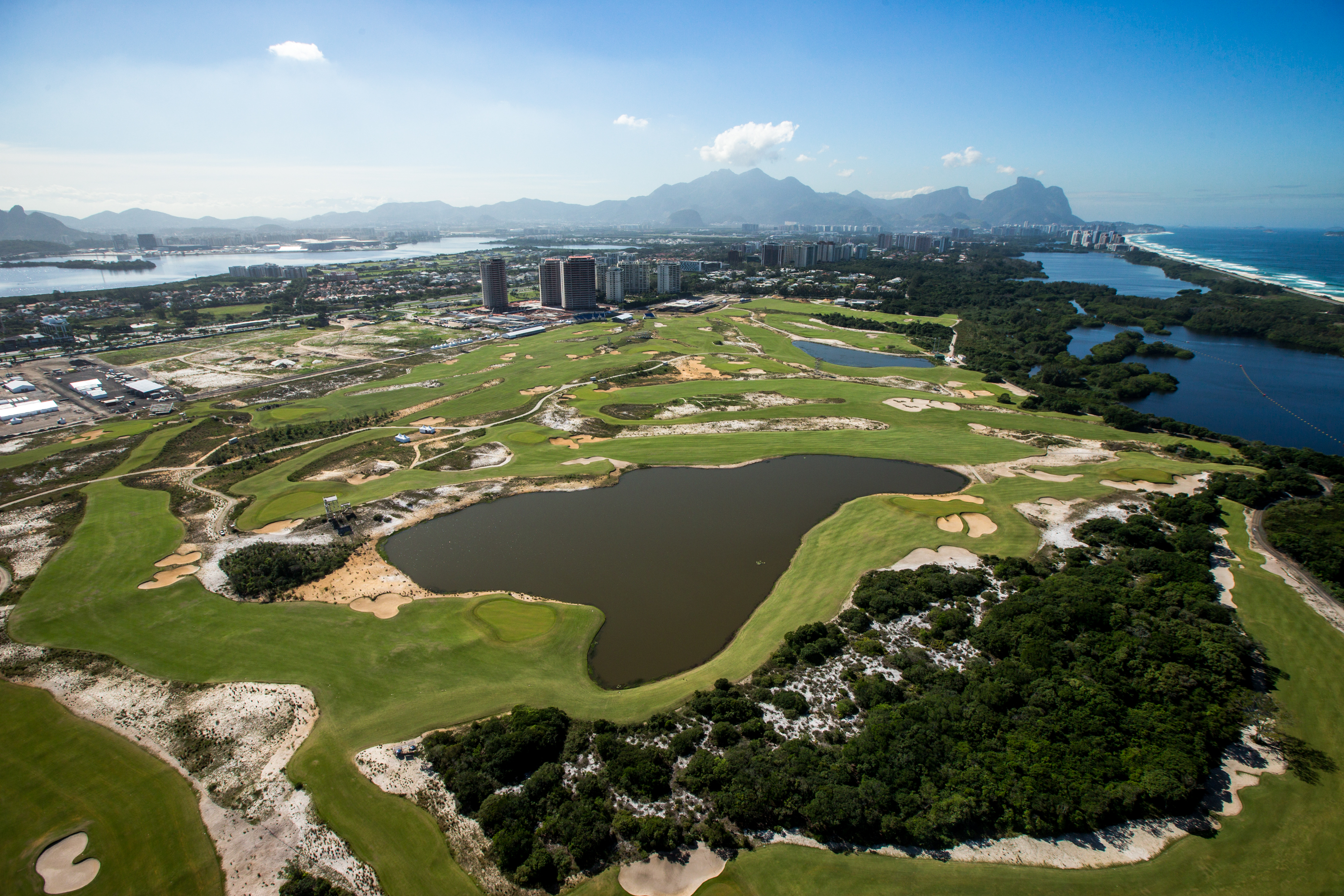
The Olympic Golf Course

- Football in Rio de Janeiro
  - Association football in Rio de Janeiro
    - Football teams in Rio de Janeiro
    - Campeonato Carioca
      - Botafogo
      - Flamengo
      - Fluminense
      - Vasco da Gama
- Sports competitions in Rio de Janeiro
  - 2007 Pan American Games
  - 2014 FIFA World Cup Final
  - 2016 Summer Olympics
  - 2016 Summer Paralympics
  - Rio Open
  - Rio Pro
- Sports venues in Rio de Janeiro
  - Barra Olympic Park
    - Future Arena
    - Olympic Aquatics Stadium
    - Olympic Tennis Centre
  - Copacabana Stadium
  - Estádio Olímpico Nilton Santos
  - Ginásio do Maracanãzinho
  - Hipódromo da Gávea
  - Jeunesse Arena
  - Maracanã Stadium
  - Olympic Golf Course
  - Sambadrome Marquês de Sapucaí

== Economy and infrastructure of Rio de Janeiro ==
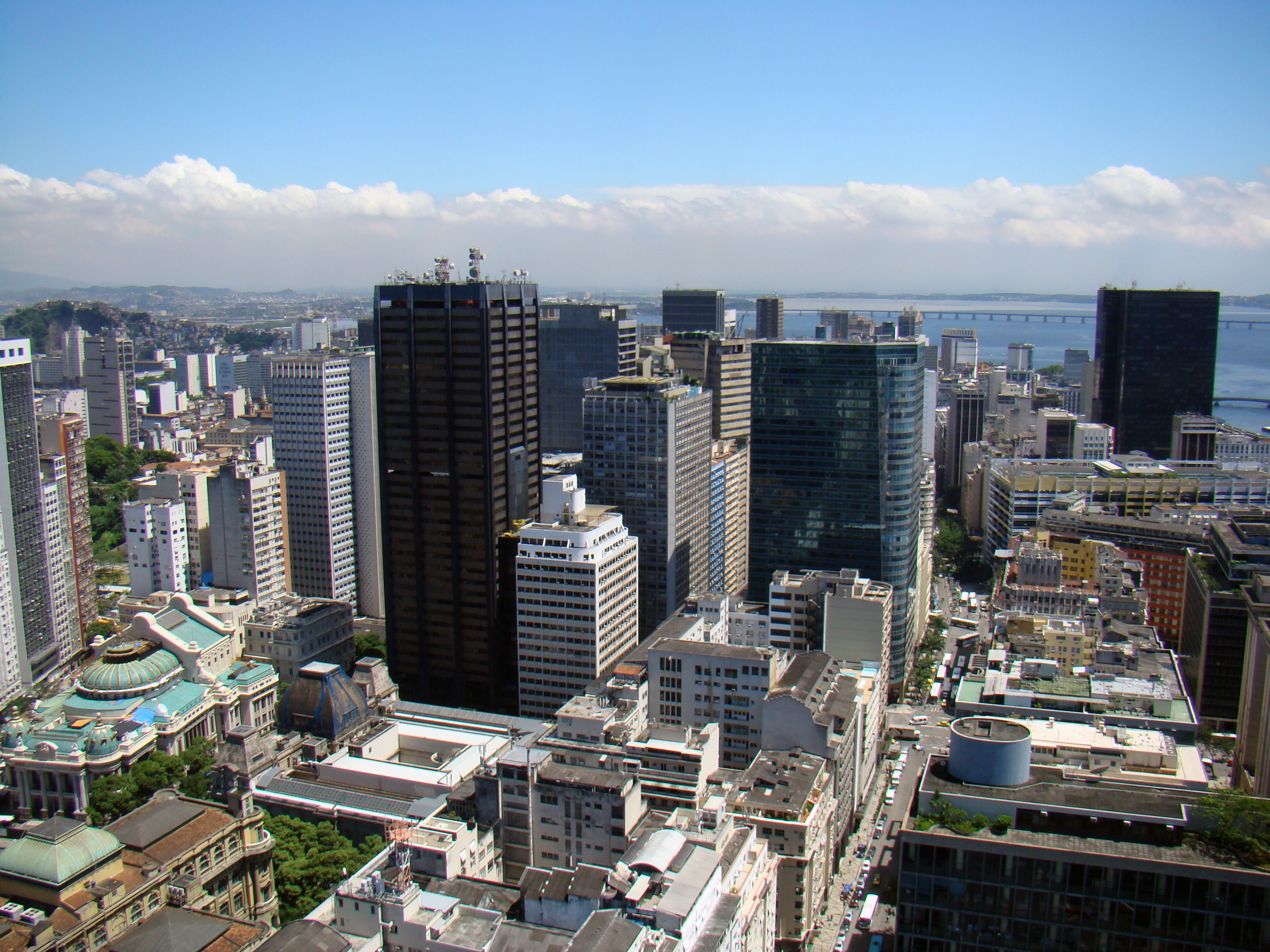
View of the financial center of Rio

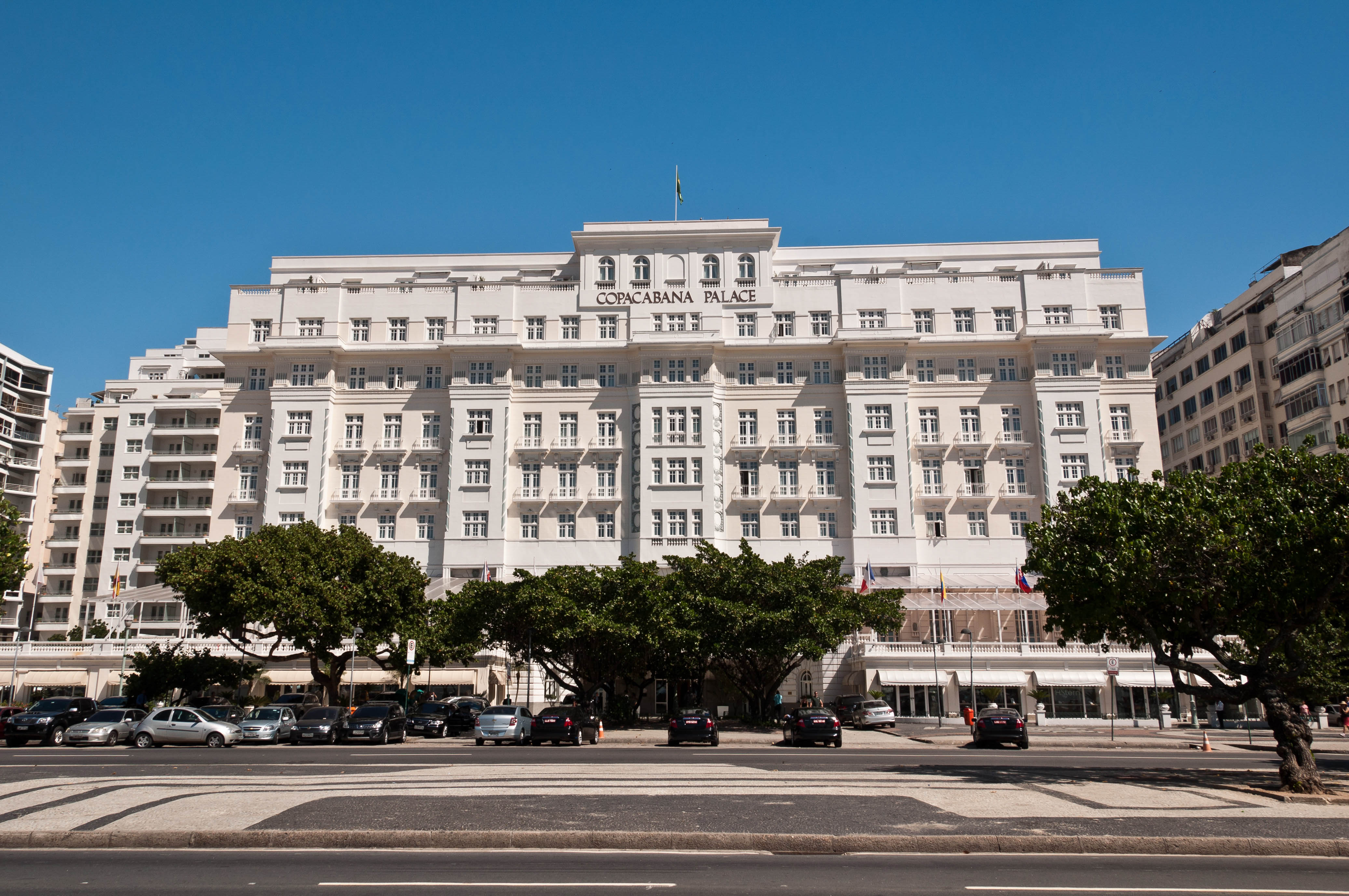
Copacabana Palace hotel

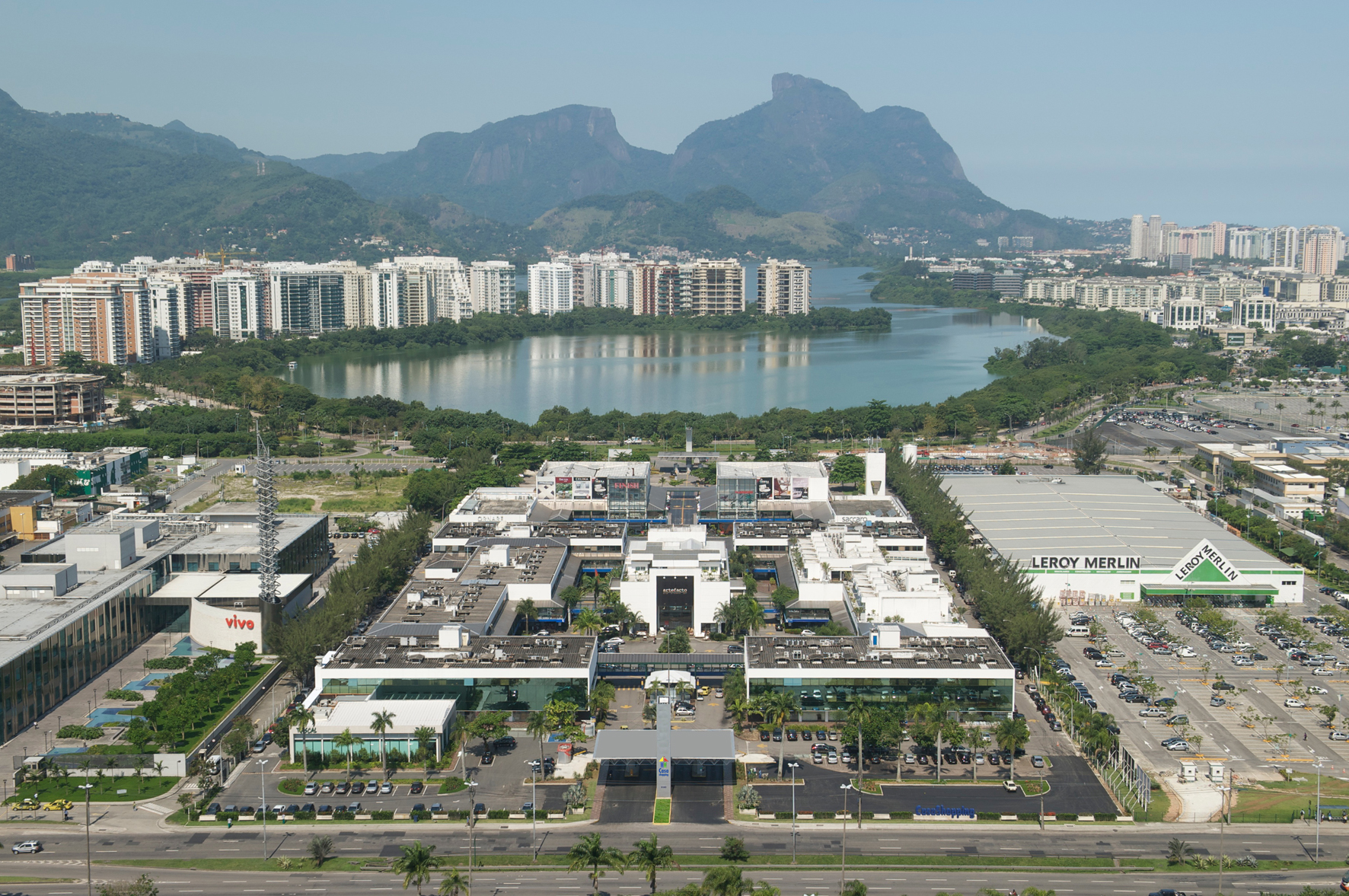
The CasaShopping mall

Economy of Rio de Janeiro

- Communications in Rio de Janeiro
- Financial services in Rio de Janeiro
  - Bradesco Seguros
  - Rio de Janeiro Stock Exchange
- Hotels and resorts in Rio de Janeiro
  - Astoria Palace Hotel
  - Copacabana Hotel Residência
  - Hilton Rio de Janeiro Copacabana
  - Hotel Atlantico Praia
  - Hotel Glória
  - Hotel Nacional Rio
  - Marina All Suites Hotel
  - Rio Othon Palace
  - Sheraton Grand Rio Hotel & Resort
- Shopping malls and markets in Rio de Janeiro
  - Barra Shopping
  - CasaShopping
  - Norte Shopping
- Tourism in Rio de Janeiro
  - Tourist attractions in Rio de Janeiro
    - Vista Chinesa

=== Transportation in Rio de Janeiro ===
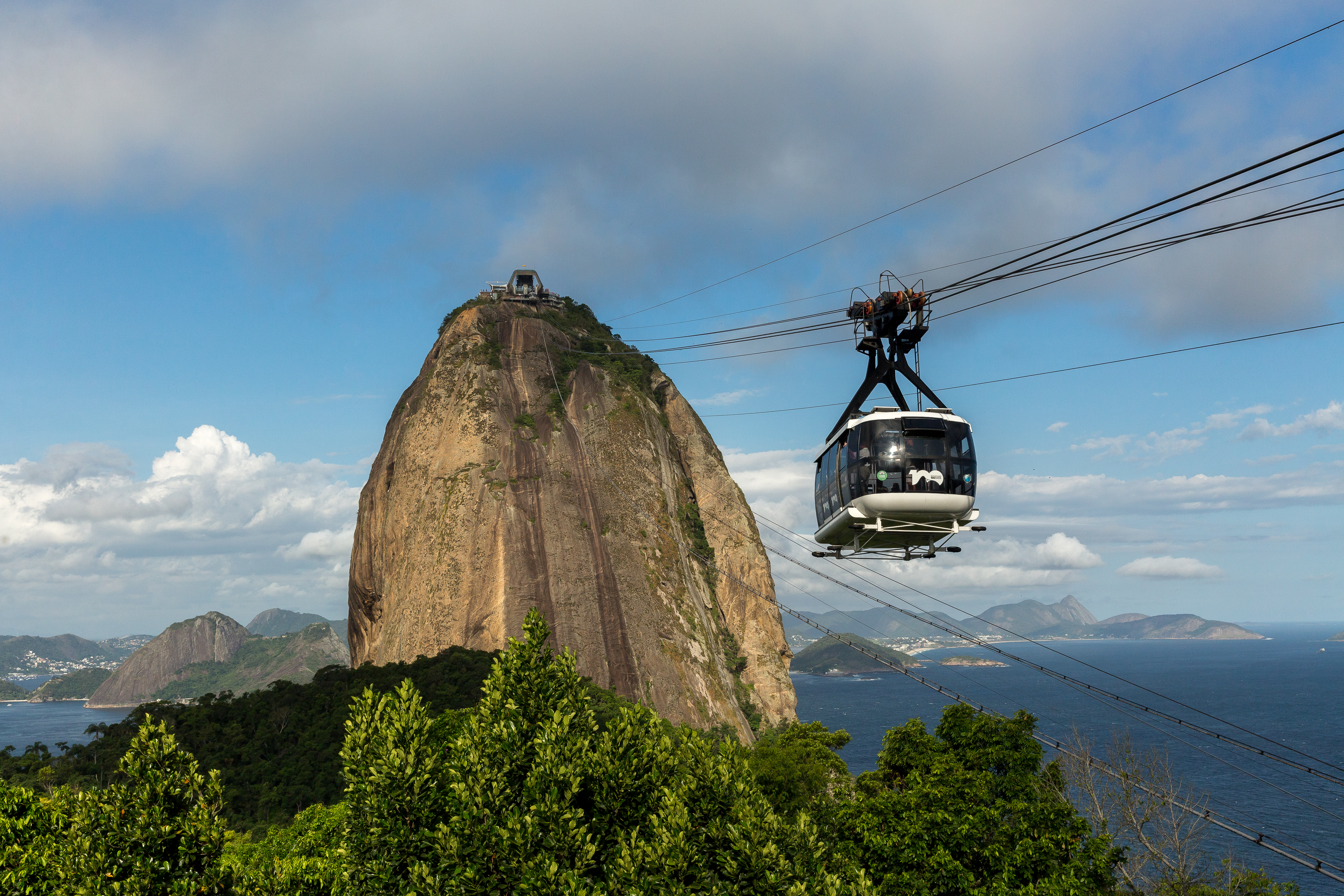
The Sugarloaf Cable Car

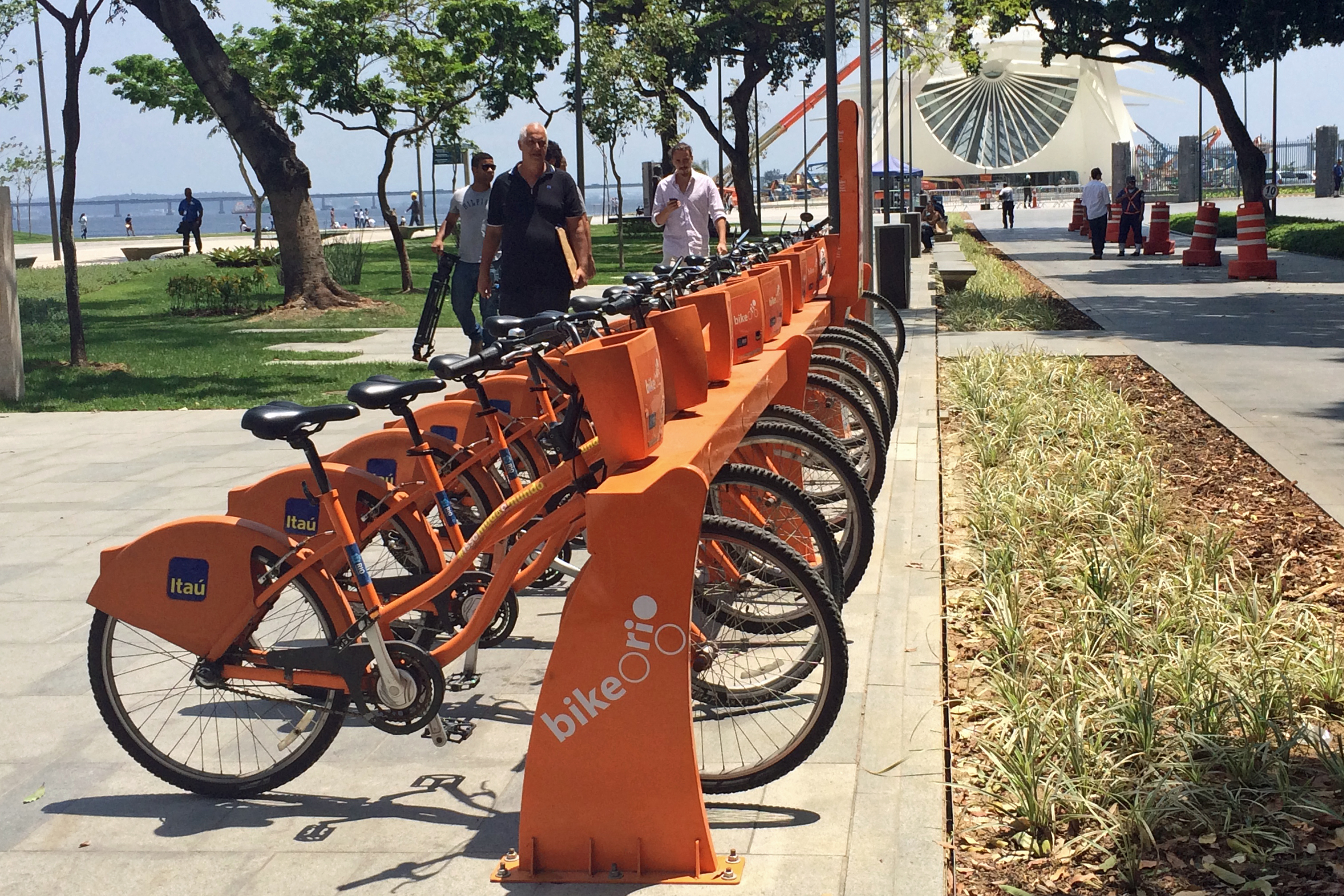
Bike Rio rental station located in Mauá Square

Public transport in Rio de Janeiro

- Air transport in Rio de Janeiro
  - Airports in Rio de Janeiro
    - Rio de Janeiro–Galeão International Airport
    - Santos Dumont Airport
- Cable transport in Rio de Janeiro
  - Sugarloaf Cable Car
  - Teleférico da Providência
  - Teleférico do Alemão
- Maritime transport in Rio de Janeiro
  - Ferry
    - Praça Quinze ferry terminal
  - Port of Rio de Janeiro
- Road transport in Rio de Janeiro
  - Buses in Rio de Janeiro
    - List of Rio de Janeiro BRT stations
  - Cycling in Rio de Janeiro
    - Bike Rio
  - Roads in Rio de Janeiro
    - Arco Metropolitano do Rio de Janeiro

==== Rail transport in Rio de Janeiro ====
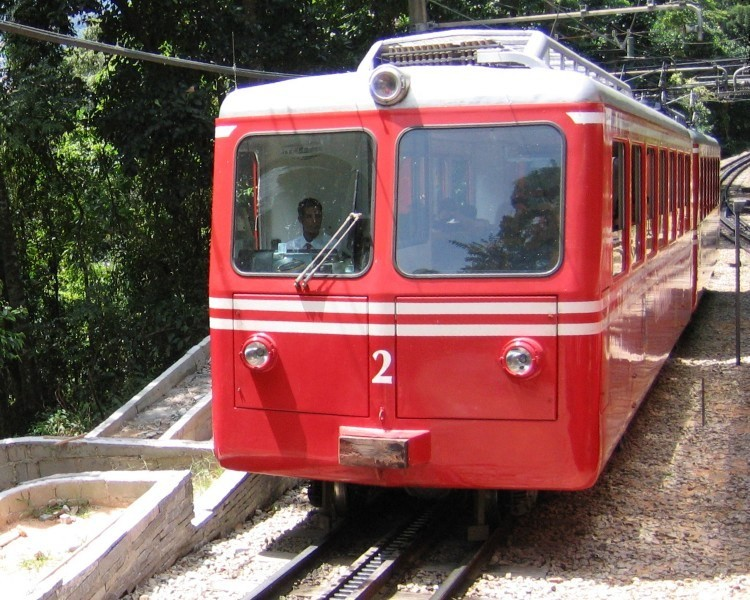
Corcovado Rack Railway

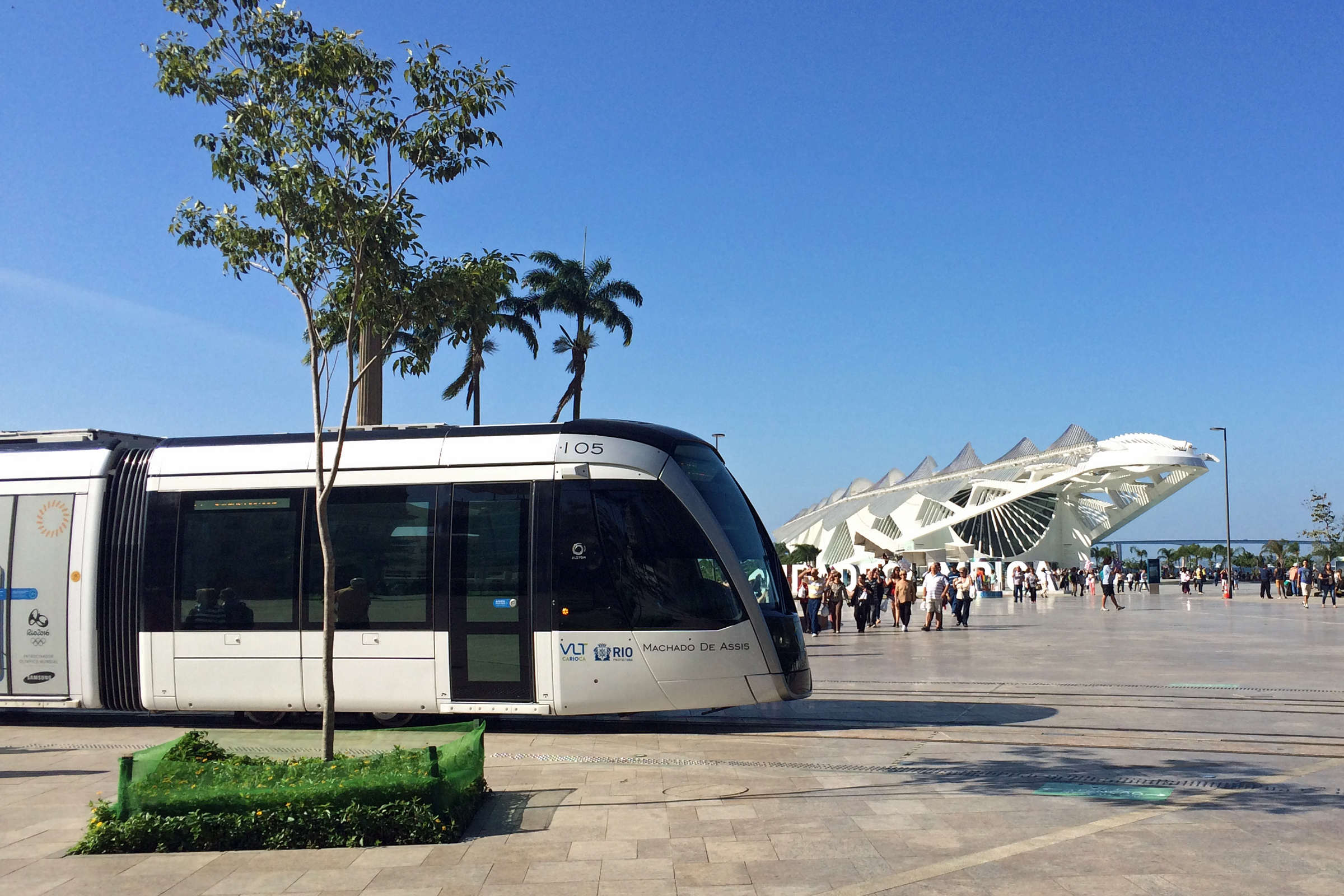
Rio de Janeiro Light Rail

Rail transport in Rio de Janeiro

- Corcovado Rack Railway
- Railway stations in Rio de Janeiro
  - Central do Brasil
- Rio de Janeiro Metro
  - Lines
    - Line 1
    - Line 2
    - Line 4
  - Stations
- SuperVia
  - List of SuperVia stations
- Trams in Rio de Janeiro
  - Rio de Janeiro Light Rail
    - Santa Teresa Tram

== Education in Rio de Janeiro ==
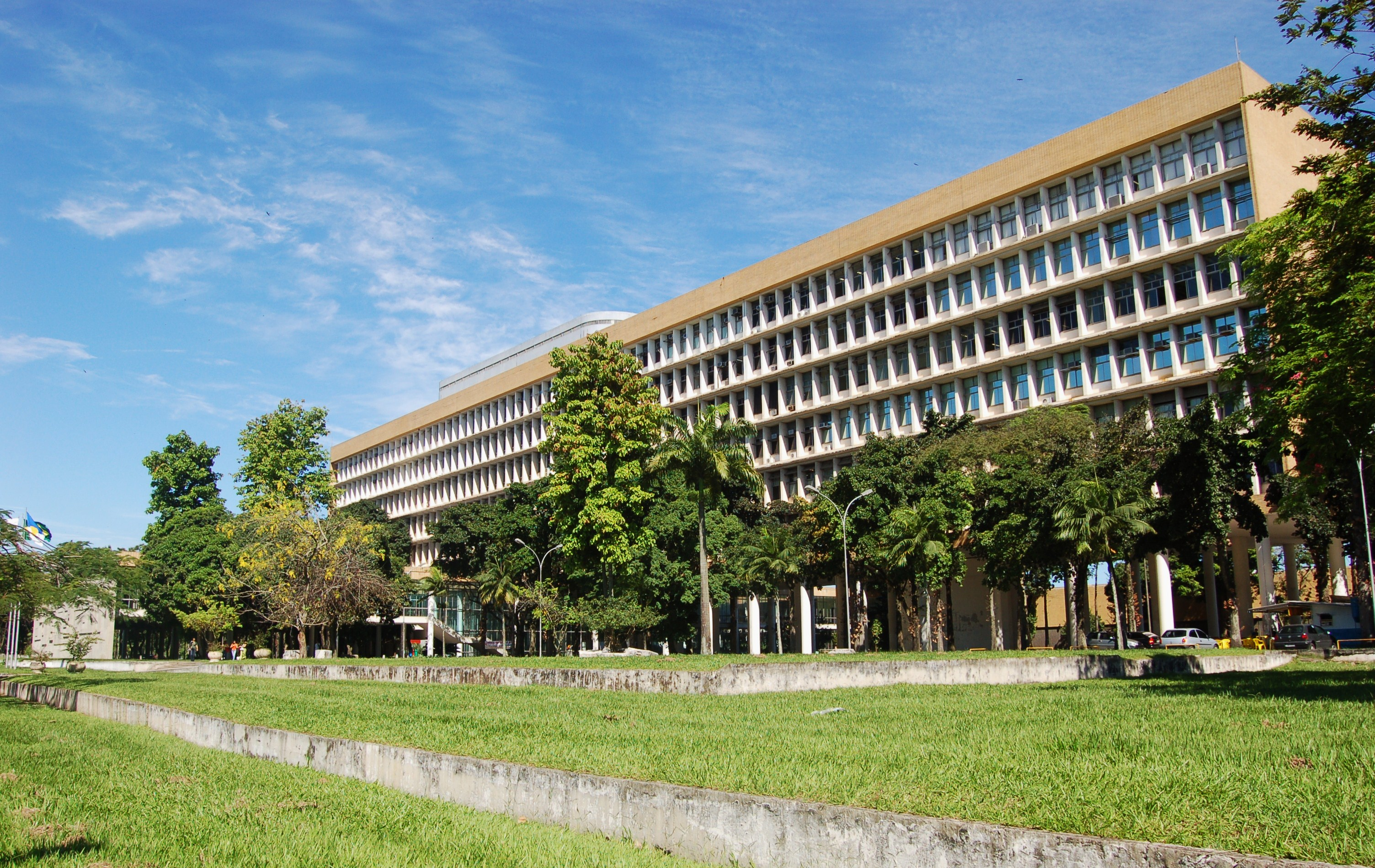
Federal University of Rio de Janeiro

Education in Rio de Janeiro

- List of Rio de Janeiro schools, colleges, universities and research centers
- Universities and colleges in Rio de Janeiro
  - Federal University of Rio de Janeiro
  - Rio de Janeiro State University
- Research institutes in Rio de Janeiro
  - Instituto Nacional de Matemática Pura e Aplicada
  - Oswaldo Cruz Foundation

== See also ==
- Outline of geography
