= Andorinha Building =

Building in Rio de Janeiro

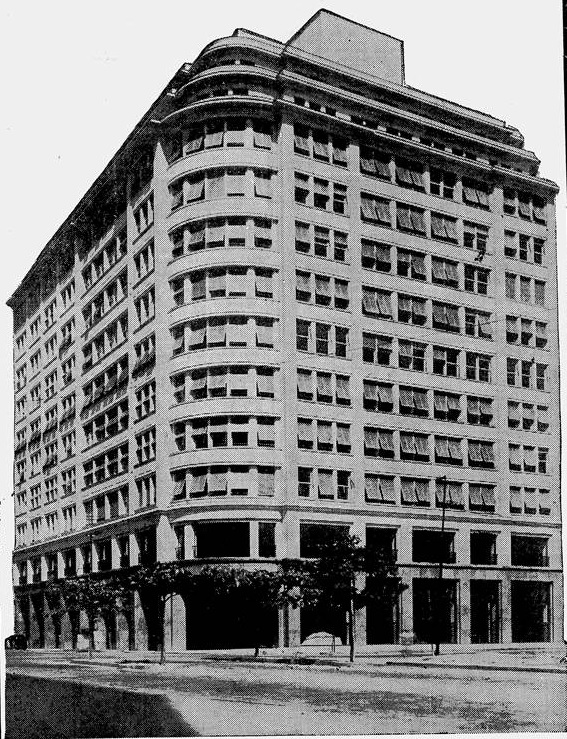
- The building in 1938

General information
- Architectural style: Art Deco, Brazilian Modernist
- Year built: 1930–1934
- Groundbreaking: 1929
- Opened: 1934
- Demolished: 1996

Technical details
- Floor count: 12

Design and construction
- Architect: Rino Levi

The Andorinha Building was an apartment building in Rio de Janeiro. It was destroyed by a fire in 1986.

After its demolition, it was replaced by the Torre Almirante.

== History ==
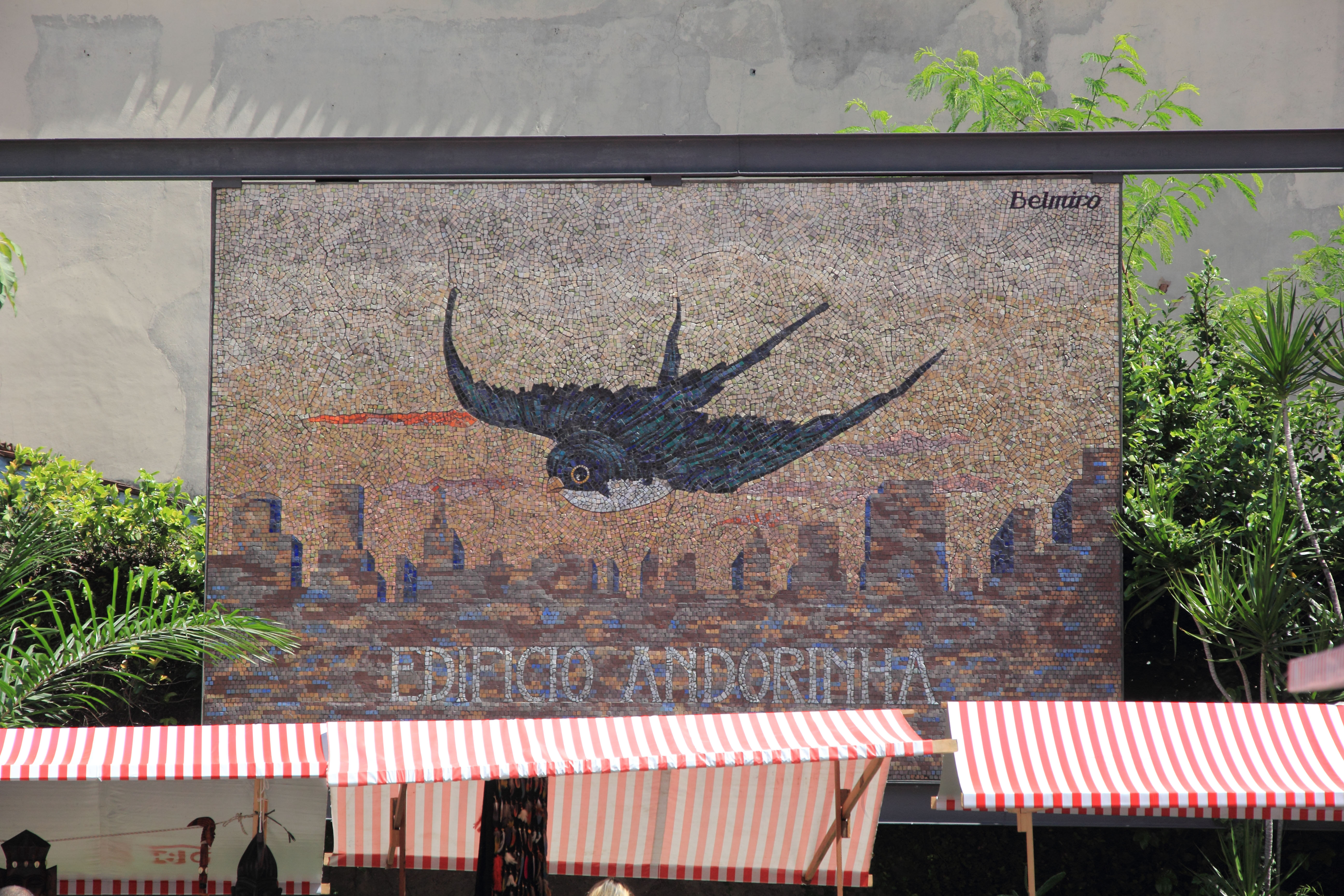
The recovered mosaic.

The building was located on the corner of Graça Aranha and Almirante Barroso avenues in central Rio de Janeiro.

On February 17, 1986, a short circuit in a two-way electrical system caused a fire, killing 21 people and injuring more than 50. Firefighters arrived a few minutes after the fire began, but were unable to take action until an hour later due to problems with their equipment, allowing the fire to destroy five floors in three hours.

The building had a mosaic panel by artist Belmiro de Almeida. Saved from the fire, the work that was abandoned for nearly twenty years was to be recovered in the beginning of the 21st century, being on display in the neighborhood of Lapa, in the capital of Rio de Janeiro.

== See also ==
- Joelma Building
