= Torre Almirante =

Skyscraper in Rio de Janeiro, Brazil

Torre Almirante is a skyscraper located at the Centro neighbourhood of Rio de Janeiro, Brazil. The 36-storey building has a height of 120 metres. Construction began in December 2002, the building was completed in October 2004.

The skyscraper was built on the former site of Andorinha, which was inaugurated in 1934 with 12 floors. The building was damaged after a huge fire which occurred on 17 February 1986, in which 21 people were killed and 50 were injured. The fire started in GE Headquarters on the 9th floor. In the new project, the facade of the Andorinha Building were incorporated into the facade of this skyscraper, to be resembled in the new project for lower floors, the same height relation of new and old building, as memory and touches of old construction in facade the new glassy tower.
