= Petrobras Headquarters =

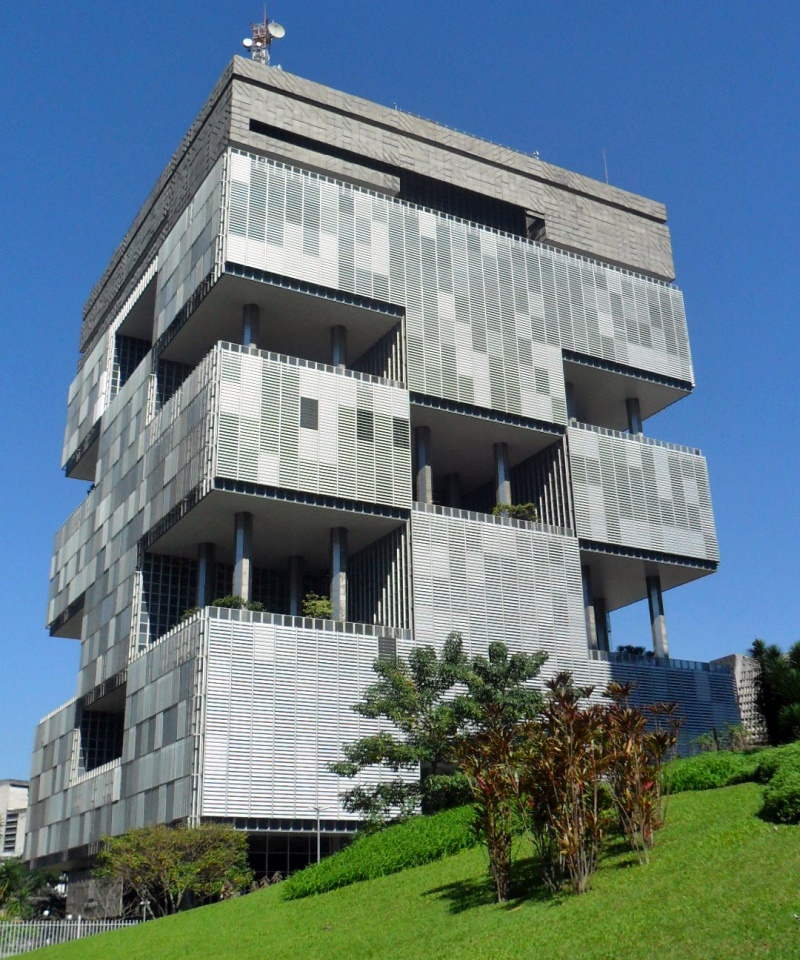
Petrobras Headquarters

The Petrobras Headquarters building, nicknamed Edise by the employees working in it, is a brutalist office building used by Petrobras in the Centro neighbourhood of Rio de Janeiro, Brazil. The 108-metre, 29-storey building was constructed from 1967 to 1972. The building's architect was Roberto Luís Gandolfi. Considered a landmark in national architecture, the building is located on Avenida República do Chile, next to the Metropolitan Cathedral.

The building's top floor caught fire on 19 May 2004, destroying the communications room.

== History ==
Through a national competition organized by the Brazilian Institute of Architects, Roberto Luis Gandolfi's design was chosen from more than 200 entries from construction firms to house Petrobras. Constructed between 1969 and 1974, the project proved to be both bold and innovative: the façade spaces create interaction between the indoor and outdoor areas, providing protection from the sun and heat. The building became an iconic landmark in downtown Rio de Janeiro and eventually established itself as a symbol of the company itself. [ 2 ] Five years after the building was completed, the Rio Metropolitan Cathedral was inaugurated right next door—transforming the area into one of the city's landmarks.

In 2021, Edise was revitalized for the first time in nearly 50 years, with the implementation of sustainability and inclusiveness measures. The gardens, both indoors and outdoors, designed by Roberto Burle Marx, will also be revitalized, maintaining their original layout, which is listed by the city.
