= Sports venues in Rio de Janeiro, Brazil =

This is a list of sports venues in Rio de Janeiro, Brazil.

== List ==
Venue	Capacity	Picture
Estádio do Maracanã	73,139	
Estádio Olímpico João Havelange	45,000	
Estádio São Januário	21,880	
HSBC Arena	14,981	
Ginásio do Maracanãzinho	13,613	
Riocentro Sports Complex	4,500	
Miécimo da Silva Sports Complex	4,000	
