= List of hotels: Countries B =

This is a list of what are intended to be the notable top hotels by country, five or four star hotels, notable skyscraper landmarks or historic hotels which are covered in multiple reliable publications. It should not be a directory of every hotel in every country:

== Bangladesh ==
- InterContinental Dhaka
- Dhaka Westin
- Le Méridien, Dhaka
- Pan Pacific Sonargaon, Dhaka
- Radisson Blu Dhaka Water Garden
- Renaissance Hotel Dhaka
- Sheraton Dhaka
- The Westin Dhaka
- Hotel Agrabad
- Hotel Shaibal
- Sayeman Beach Resort
- Sea Pearl Beach Resort & Spa

== Bahamas ==
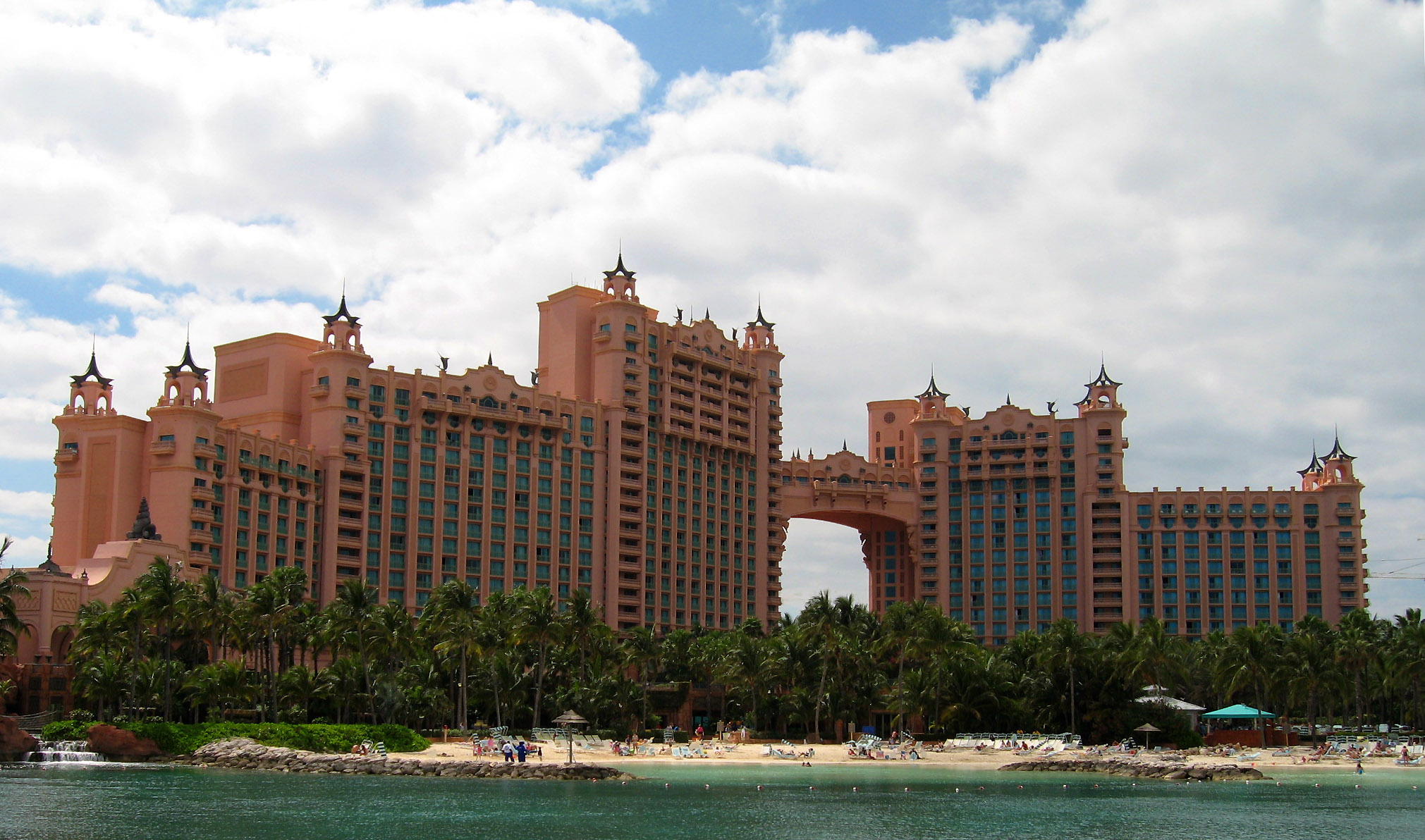
Atlantis Paradise Island

- Atlantis Paradise Island
- British Colonial Hilton Nassau
- The Cove Atlantis
- Grand Central Hotel
- Graycliff
- Regatta Point
- Xanadu Beach Resort & Marina

== Barbados ==
- The Crane, Saint Philip
- Fairmont Royal Pavilion, Saint James
- Sandy Lane, Holetown

== Belgium ==
- Hotel Astoria, Brussels
- Hotel Le Plaza, Brussels
- Hotel Métropole, Brussels
- The Hotel, Brussels

== Belize ==
- Chaa Creek, near Benque Viejo
- Pook's Hill Lodge
- San Ignacio Resort Hotel, San Ignacio Town

== Benin ==
- Benin Marina, Cotonou

== Bermuda ==
- 9 Beaches, Sandys Parish
- Elbow Beach, Paget Parish
- The Fairmont Hamilton Princess, Hamilton
- Hamilton Hotel (defunct), Hamilton
- The Reefs, Southampton

== Bhutan ==
- Hotel Jumolhari, Thimphu
- Hotel Motithang, Thimphu
- Hotel Wangchuck, Thimphu
- Taj Tashi, Thimphu

== Bolivia ==
- Palacio de Sal, Salar de Uyuni

== Bonaire ==
- Divi Flamingo Beach Resort & Casino
- Plaza Resort Bonaire

== Brazil ==
- Ariau Towers
- Belmond Hotel das Cataratas
- Centro Empresarial Nações Unidas
- Dom Pedro Hotels & Golf Collection
- Grande Hotel de Goiânia
- Kubitschek Plaza
- Palácio Quitandinha
- Plaza São Rafael Hotel

=== São Paulo ===
- Hotel Unique
- Othon Palace Hotel

=== Rio De Janeiro ===
- Astoria Palace Hotel
- Copacabana Palace
- Copacabana Hotel Residência
- Hotel Glória
- Hilton Rio de Janeiro Copacabana
- Hotel Nacional Rio
- Hotel Atlantico Praia
- LSH Hotel
- Marina All Suites Hotel
- Rio Othon Palace
- Sheraton Grand Rio Hotel & Resort
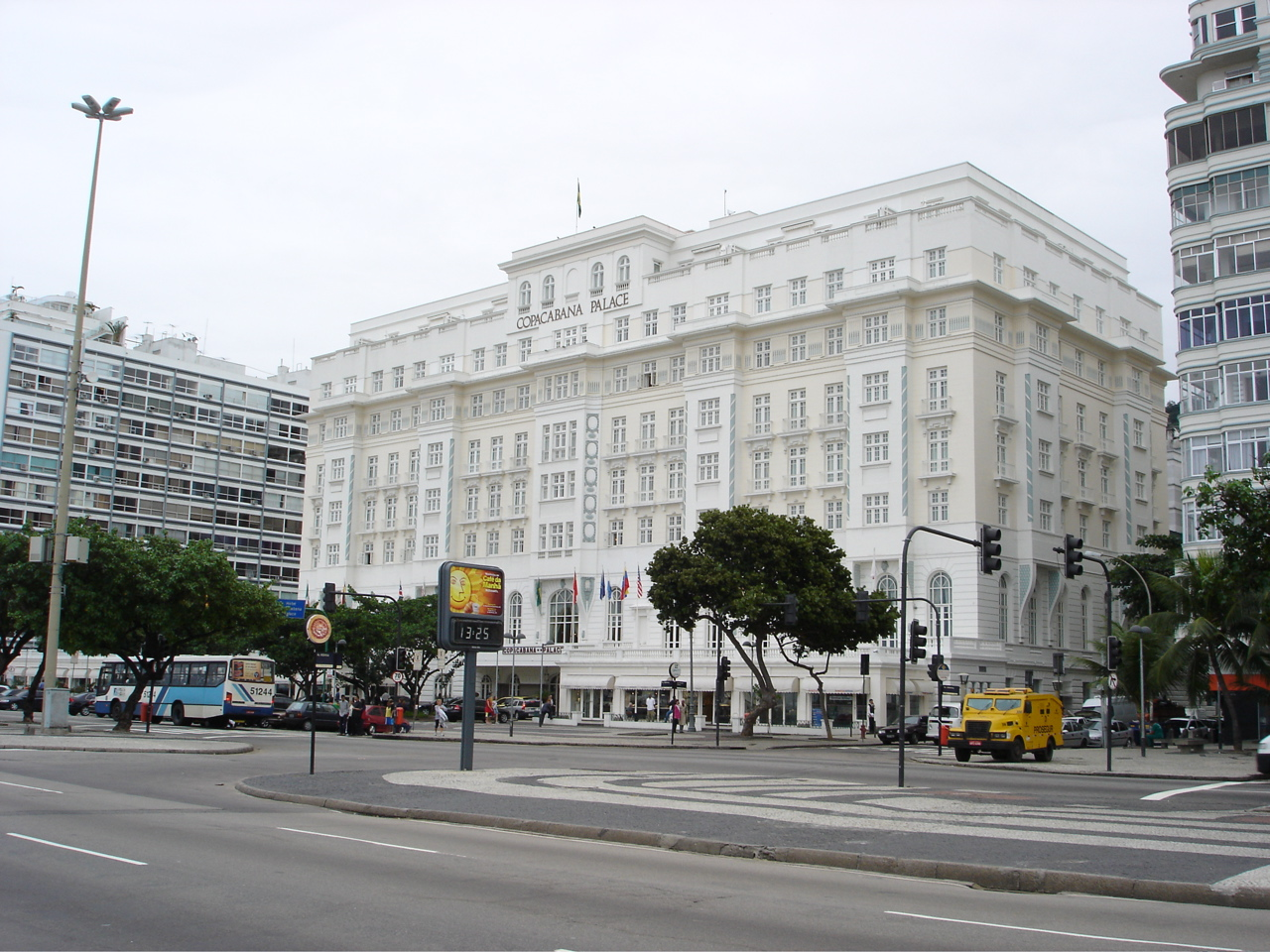
Copacabana Palace

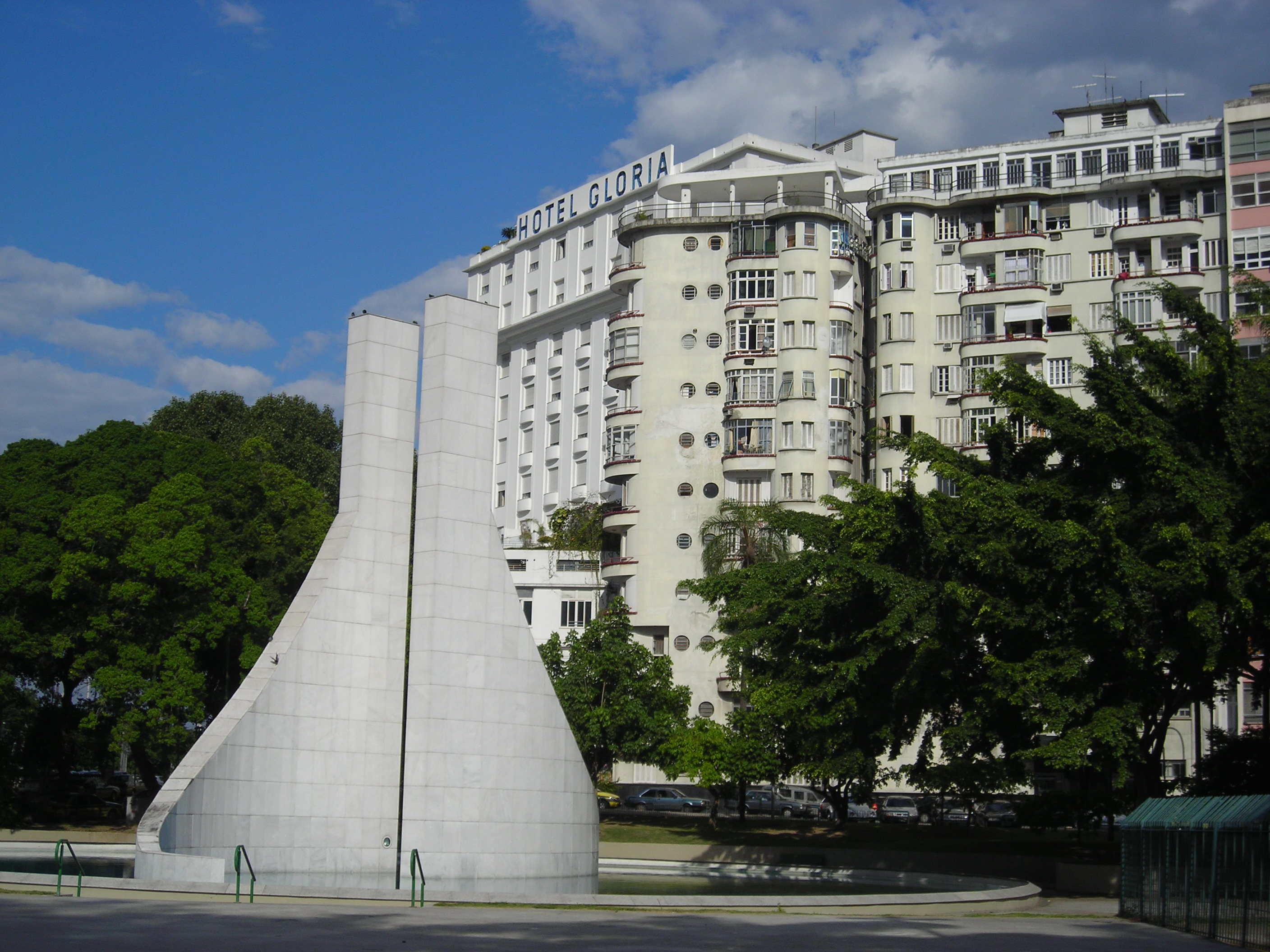
Hotel Glória

== British Virgin Islands ==
- Bitter End Yacht Club

== Brunei ==
- The Empire Brunei

== Bulgaria ==
=== Burgas ===
- Hotel Bulgaria Burgas
- Hotel Mirage Burgas

=== Golden Sands ===
- Hotel Admiral Golden Sands
- Melia Grand Hermitage

=== Plovdiv ===
- Maritsa Hotel
- Novotel Plovdiv

=== Sofia ===
- Grand Hotel Sofia
- Hotel Marinela Sofia
- Hotel Rodina
- Kempinski Hotel Zografski
- Princess Hotel Sofia

=== Varna ===
- Interhotel Cherno More

== Burma ==
- Andaman Club, Thahtay Kyun Island
- Governor's Residence, Yangon
- Grand Park Hotel, Mandalay
- Kandawgyi Palace Hotel, Yangon
- Strand Hotel, Yangon

== Burundi ==
- Hôtel Source du Nil
