= Plovdiv Language School =

Plovdiv Language School Езикова гимназия "Пловдив"

Location
- 123 Bulgaria Boulevard, Northern District, Plovdiv, Bulgaria, 4003
- Coordinates: 42°9′20.1″N 24°42′56.44″E

Information
- Type: Gymnasium
- Founded: 5 July 1958
- Principal: Nikolay Radev
- Grades: 8-12
- Gender: Mixed
- Website: Official Site of the Plovdiv English Language School

Plovdiv Language School (Bulgarian: Езикова гимназия "Пловдив"), also known as the English Language School (Английската гимназия), is a secondary school in Plovdiv, Bulgaria's second largest city. It is situated in the northwestern outskirts of Plovdiv in the Northern District of the city. Its premises include the school building, two dormitories, a sports hall and several sports fields. It is a general education profiled gymnasium with municipal funding that provides secondary education with focus on English and German languages. The school has its own newspaper Delta Te, established in 2000. It is among the few schools in Bulgaria accredited to UNESCO.

== History ==
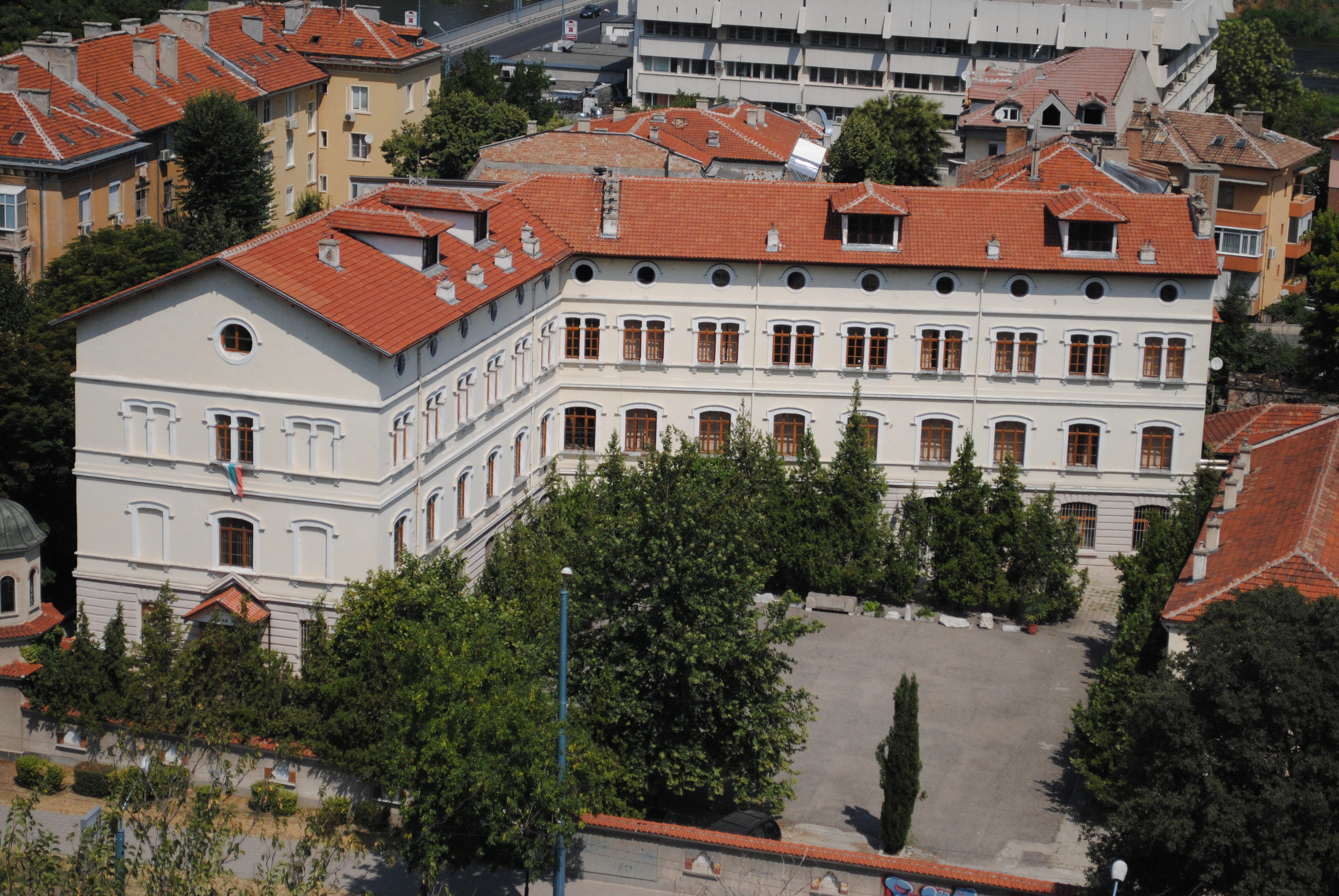
The edifice of the Plovdiv Theological Seminary, the first building of the school

The institution was established on 5 July 1958 by a decision of the Ministry of Education of Bulgaria as a mixed secondary school with English language teaching, hence its common unofficial name English Language School. In the period 1960–1993 it was named after the prominent Bulgarian socialist politician and writer Georgi Kirkov. It was initially housed in the edifice of the Plovdiv Theological Seminary, which had been disbanded by the socialist authorities in 1950. In 1976 the school was moved to its present location in the Northern District of Plovdiv. The first principal was Lyuben Hristov, who served in the period 1958–1992 and oversaw the school's expansion and its establishment as one of the nation's most prestigious secondary schools. In 1983 it was awarded the Order of Saints Cyril and Methodius, 2nd class on the occasion of its 25-th anniversary. In 1990 the teaching of German and French was introduced. In 1992 the French classes were separated in their own school, the Antoine de Saint-Exupéry French Language School, and English and German remained the languages studied at the gymnasium. In 2001 the Ministry of Education and Science awarded the school with the Neofit Rilski Honorary Award, the highest in Bulgarian education, for comprehensive and highly professional activity in the public education system.

== Education ==
Plovdiv Language School has 1,300 students, divided into a total of 50 classes, and in each of the five educational levels (from VIII to XII grade). Each grade includes four classes in the German language profile and six classes in the English language profile. The high school accepts students who have completed the VII grade, and since 1961 the selection has been made on the basis of written competitive exams in Bulgarian language and literature and in mathematics. Both profiles are studied under the highest national and international standards, including the Cambridge Assessment English and the Deutsches Sprachdiplom Stufe I and II, the latter allowing pursuing of higher education in Germany without exams. Over 95% of the school's graduates pursue highest education in Bulgaria and abroad, including the US, the United Kingdom, Germany, Switzerland, etc.

== Alumni ==
Many of the school's graduates are part of Bulgaria's intellectual and business elite. Alumni include former Prime Minister Zhan Videnov, former minister of defense Angel Naydenov, former minister of European affairs Gergana Pasi, former chief prosecutor Sotir Tsatsarov, former deputy minister of foreign affairs Yuri Sterk, investigative journalist Christo Grozev, journalist Emil Koshlukov, economist Momchil Andreev, as well as many diplomats, doctors, politicians, business people, etc. The Plovdiv English Language School Alumni Association (PELSA) maintains a virtual museum of the school.
