= Akboria =

- Interactive map of the Akboria area

General information
- Location: Bogra, Rajshahi Division, Bangladesh, Kazi Nazrul Islam Road
- Coordinates: 24°50′58.99″N 89°22′21.43″E
- Opening: 1911
- Owner: Akbor Ali Miya

Other information
- Number of rooms: 37
- Number of restaurants: 4

Website
- akboria.com

Akboria (Bengali: আকবরিয়া) is one of the oldest corporate groups in northern Bangladesh. It started its journey with a restaurant that aimed to bring change in the lives of inhabitants of Bogra in 1911.

== History ==
In 1905, Late. Md. Khoshjahan Ali opened "Muhammad Ali Restaurant" . After 6 years in 1911, it was renamed as "Akboria Grand Hotel" (Bengali: আকবরিয়া গ্র্যান্ড হোটেল) by his son, Late. Md. Akbar Ali who took over the business from his father. During the 19th century, Hindu were the majority in northern region of the country and had dominance over most of businesses, as a result the Muslim community was treated unfairly. Since the cow is a sacred animal to the Hindus, its consumption was prohibited in the whole northern region of the then Rajshahi Division. To tackle the injustice towards Muslims, 'Akboria Grand Hotel' started its journey and is claimed to be the first restaurant that started selling beef commercially in the northern region, within very short time gaining massive popularity among the Muslim community. After few years, they started to feed poor people for free everyday past mid-night and are claimed to be the only company to do so in the country continuously for over 100 years till today. It is not unusual for restaurants to feed people with leftovers, but Akboria is claimed to feed over 300 destitute people everyday past mid-night for free with freshly cooked local cuisine dishes like rice, curry, local type of ragù etc. cooked specially for them. They are also claimed to be the largest sellers of Lachcha Semai, a Bengali local version of fried vermicelli, in the district.

== See also ==
- List of hotels in Bangladesh
- Bogra District
