= Rada Laykova =

Bulgarian politician (born 1990)

Rada Laykova MEP
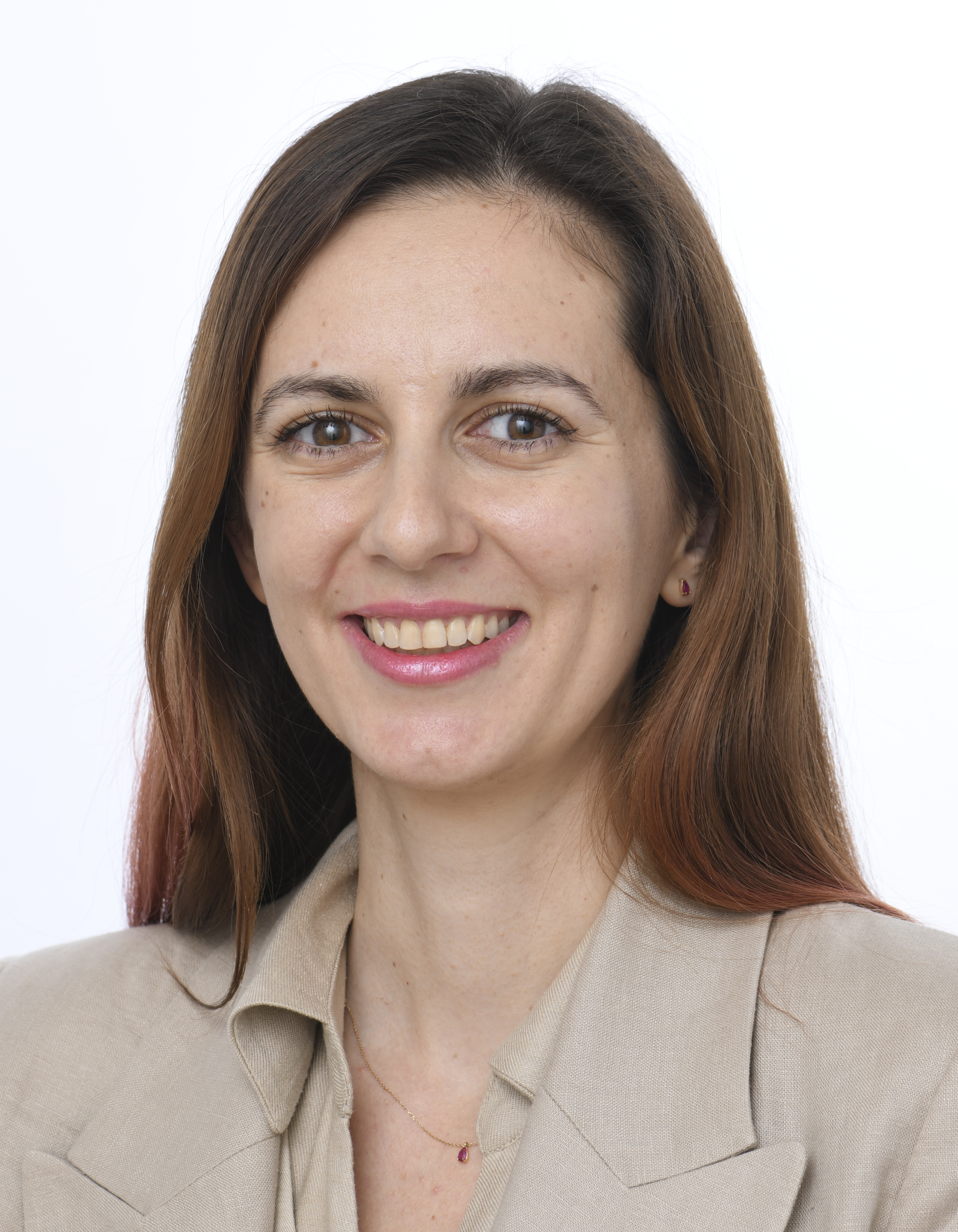

Member of the European Parliament
- Incumbent
- Assumed office 16 July 2024
- Constituency: Bulgaria

Personal details
- Born: Rada Stefanova Laykova; 3 April 1990 (age 36) Plovdiv, Bulgaria
- Party: Revival
- Other political affiliations: Europe of Sovereign Nations
- Education: Plovdiv Language School; Cardiff University; Humboldt University of Berlin; European University Viadrina

Rada Stefanova Laykova (Bulgarian: Рада Стефанова Лайкова; born 3 April 1990) is a Bulgarian politician of Revival who was elected member of the European Parliament in 2024.

== Early life and career ==
Laykova was born in Plovdiv. She has graduated from Plovdiv Language School. She obtained a BSc Econ (Hons) in European Union Studies from Cardiff University and a master's degree in European studies at Humboldt University of Berlin. Later, she pursued a master's degree in European Business Law at European University Viadrina. She worked in the German Bundestag, where she was senior advisor for European affairs to the parliamentary group of Alternative for Germany.

== Spreading misinformation about the Savings and Investment Union ==
In her interview with Bulgarian YouTuber Martin Karbovski, Laykova incorrectly stated that the European Parliament had begun discussions on a 6-month "expiration" period for personal bank accounts. According to Laykova, salary funds would "disappear" from personal accounts in 6 months if they are not spent. The same would happen to personal savings in pension and investment funds. In fact, there is no mention of any expiration period or any intention to appropriate private savings by the European Commission or any other EU body.

Laykova seems to have manipulatively misrepresented to the Savings and Investments Union communication unveiled by the EU Commission after the Draghi report on EU competitiveness. None of her statements can be supported by the text of the communication.
