= Hotel Admiral Golden Sands =

Hotel Admiral Xотел Адмирал
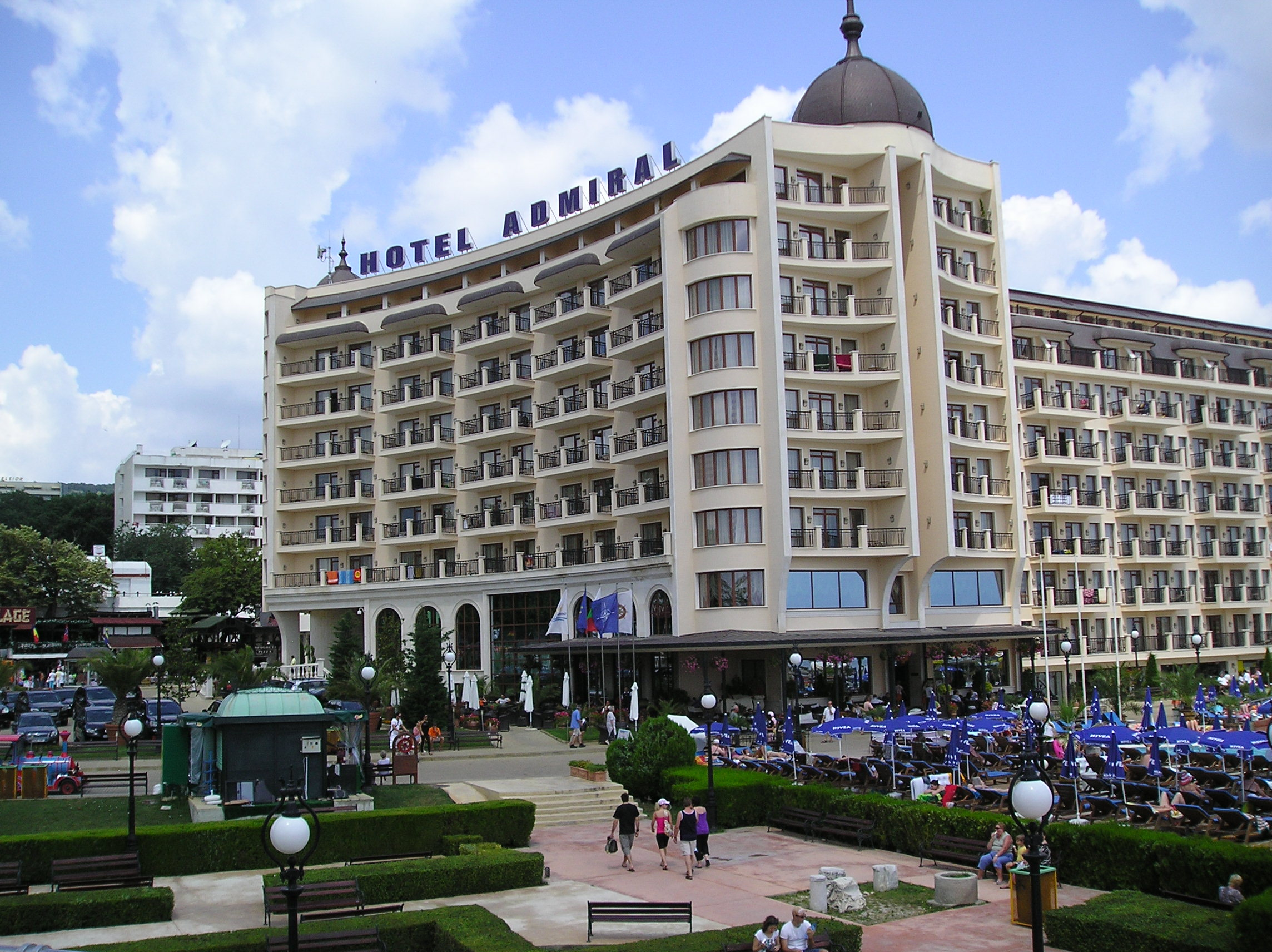

- Location within Bulgaria

General information
- Location: Golden Sands, Bulgaria, 9007 Golden Sands
- Coordinates: 43.2865396°N 28.04216°E

Technical details
- Floor count: 7

Other information
- Number of rooms: 301
- Number of suites: 5 + 12
- Number of restaurants: 2

Website
- www.admiral.bg/en

Hotel Admiral ("Xотел Адмирал") is a 5-star hotel in the center of the Golden Sands beach resort in Bulgaria.

The hotel was opened in 2004 and is located only 20 meters from the sea.

Interesting facts about the resort:

- The Golden Sands resort is located in an ecologically clean bay on the northern Bulgarian Black Sea coast near the Golden Sands Nature Park.
- The beach is 3.5 km long and about 100 metres wide.
- The resort received the Blue Flag 12 times from Foundation for Environmental Education, a certification that an operator of the beach, marina etc., complies with required standards.

== See also ==
- List of hotels in Bulgaria
