= Yuri Sterk =

Bulgarian diplomat

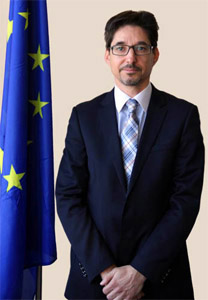

Ambassador, Permanent Representative of Bulgaria to the United Nations Office and other international organizations in Geneva
- Incumbent
- Assumed office 15 December 2020
- Preceded by: Deyana Kostadinova

Personal details
- Born: October 10, 1962 Bulgaria

Yuri Sterk (Bulgarian: Юрий Щерк) is a Bulgarian career diplomat. He served as Deputy Foreign Minister of Bulgaria from 12 May 2017 until 21 June 2019, following the end of his assignment as Ambassador / Head of EU Delegation to the Republic of Uzbekistan, a position he held from December 2012 until September 2016.

== Education ==
Ambassador Yuri Sterk, a career diplomat from the Ministry of Foreign Affairs of Bulgaria, has graduated the Plovdiv Language School and has a degree with Honours in Public International Law from the Moscow Institute of International Relations; he has been a trainee in the Diplomat Training Program at Stanford University, California; he also has a DEA in Political Science, profile "Construction européenne" from the Institute of Political Science, Robert Schuman University, Strasbourg, France.

== Career ==
Sterk has served as an adviser, as head of the Public International Law unit, director of the NATO directorate and as director-general for political affairs and security at the Ministry of Foreign Affairs of the Republic of Bulgaria.

In 2001-2005 he was Permanent Representative of Bulgaria to the Council of Europe in Strasbourg and from 2011 to 2012 - Ambassador of the Republic of Bulgaria to the State of Israel. Just turned 50, following a competitive international selection procedure he was appointed Ambassador of the European Delegation to Uzbekistan. There was only one diplomat of Bulgaria before him to have served as ambassador of the European Union – the former prime minister Philip Dimitrov, who has been head of the delegation of EU to Georgia. On 5 April 2019, by a decree of the President of Republic of Bulgaria Yuri Sterk was appointed Ambassador extraordinary and plenipotentiary of Bulgaria to the Kingdom of Morocco.

On 25 November 2020, he was relieved of his assignment as Ambassador Extraordinary and Plenipotentiary to Morocco and appointed Permanent Representative of the Republic of Bulgaria to the United Nations Office in Geneva and to other international organizations in Geneva, Swiss Confederation.

On 8 February 2021, Ambassador Yuri Sterk was elected vice-president of the UN Human Rights Council for a one-year term.

== See also ==
- Ambassadors of the European Union
- Uzbekistan-European Union relations
- Europe in the World - European External Action Service
