= Man Myanmar Plaza =

- Plaza in 2021
- Interactive map of the Man Myanmar Plaza area

General information
- Status: Completed
- Location: 84th Road between 27th and 28th Streets
- Coordinates: 21°58′53″N 96°04′39″E
- Construction started: 2004
- Completed: 2010 (Zegyo Plaza); 2014 (twin towers)
- Cost: US$65 million

Height
- Roof: 90 m (295 ft) (estimated)

Technical details
- Floor count: 25 (twin towers); 6 (Zegyo Plaza)
- Floor area: 13,935 m^{2} (150,000 sq ft) (Zegyo Plaza)

Design and construction
- Main contractor: Man Myanmar Construction

Man Myanmar Plaza (Burmese: မန်း မြန်မာ ပလာဇာ; also known as Man Myanmar Zegyo Plaza (မန်း မြန်မာ ဈေးချို ပလာဇာ)) is a mixed use complex in Mandalay, Myanmar. The complex consists of a 13,935 m^{2} (150,000 sq ft) six-story shopping center, and two 25-story condominium buildings. From 2014 until the completion of Grand Park Hotel, Mandalay in 2019, the twin condo towers were the tallest buildings in Mandalay, as well as the tallest buildings outside of Yangon.

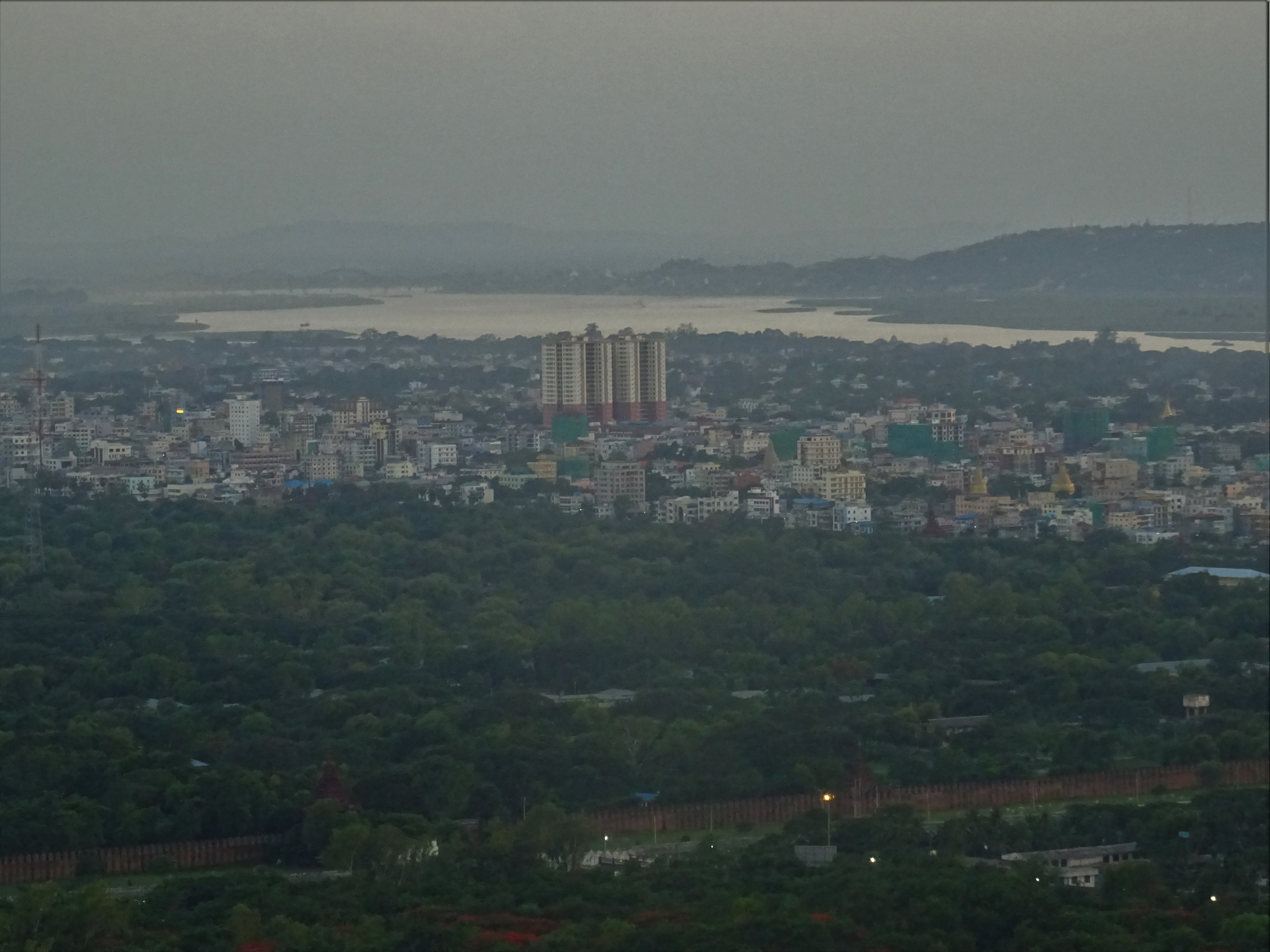
Man Myanmar Plaza from Mandalay Hill

The fifth floor of the plaza suffered a fire in 2018.

Records
Preceded by	Tallest Buildings in Mandalay; 2014–2019	Succeeded by Grand Park Hotel, Mandalay
