= Maritsa Hotel =

- (Bulgarian: Хотел Марица)
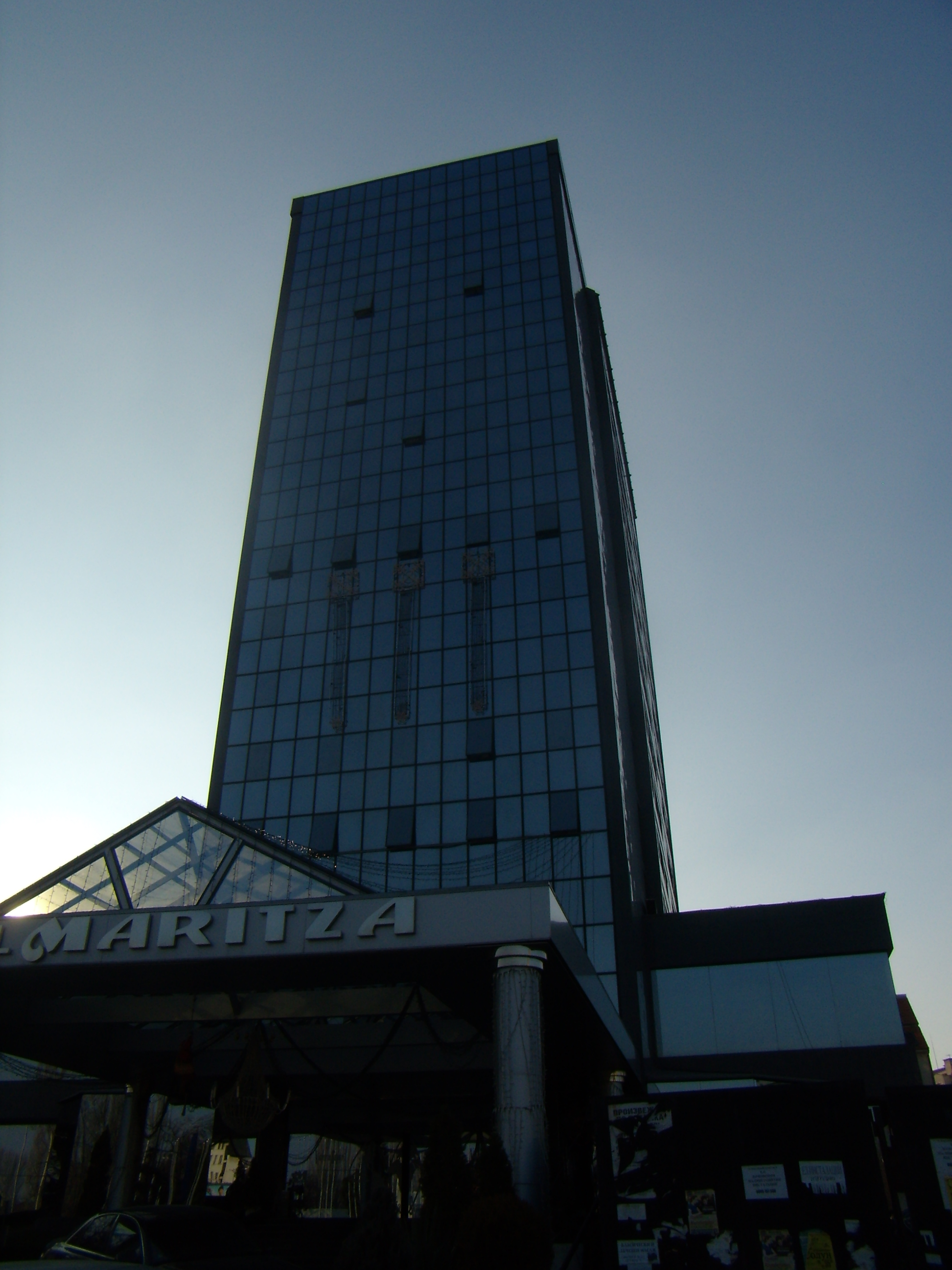
- Maritsa Hotel (2008)
- Interactive map of the Maritsa Hotel area

General information
- Type: Hotel
- Location: Plovdiv, Bulgaria
- Coordinates: 42°9′22″N 24°44′55″E

The Maritsa Hotel (Bulgarian: Хотел Марица) is a Bulgarian four-star hotel, located in Plovdiv.

== Description ==
It is situated on the northern bank of the Maritsa river, facing the International Fair Plovdiv across the Tsar Boris III Boulevard, in the city's northern district.

The hotel has 47 single rooms, 87 double rooms and 18 flats.

== See also ==
- Novotel Plovdiv
