= Melia Grand Hermitage =

Melia Grand Hermitage Xотел Мелия гранд ермитаж
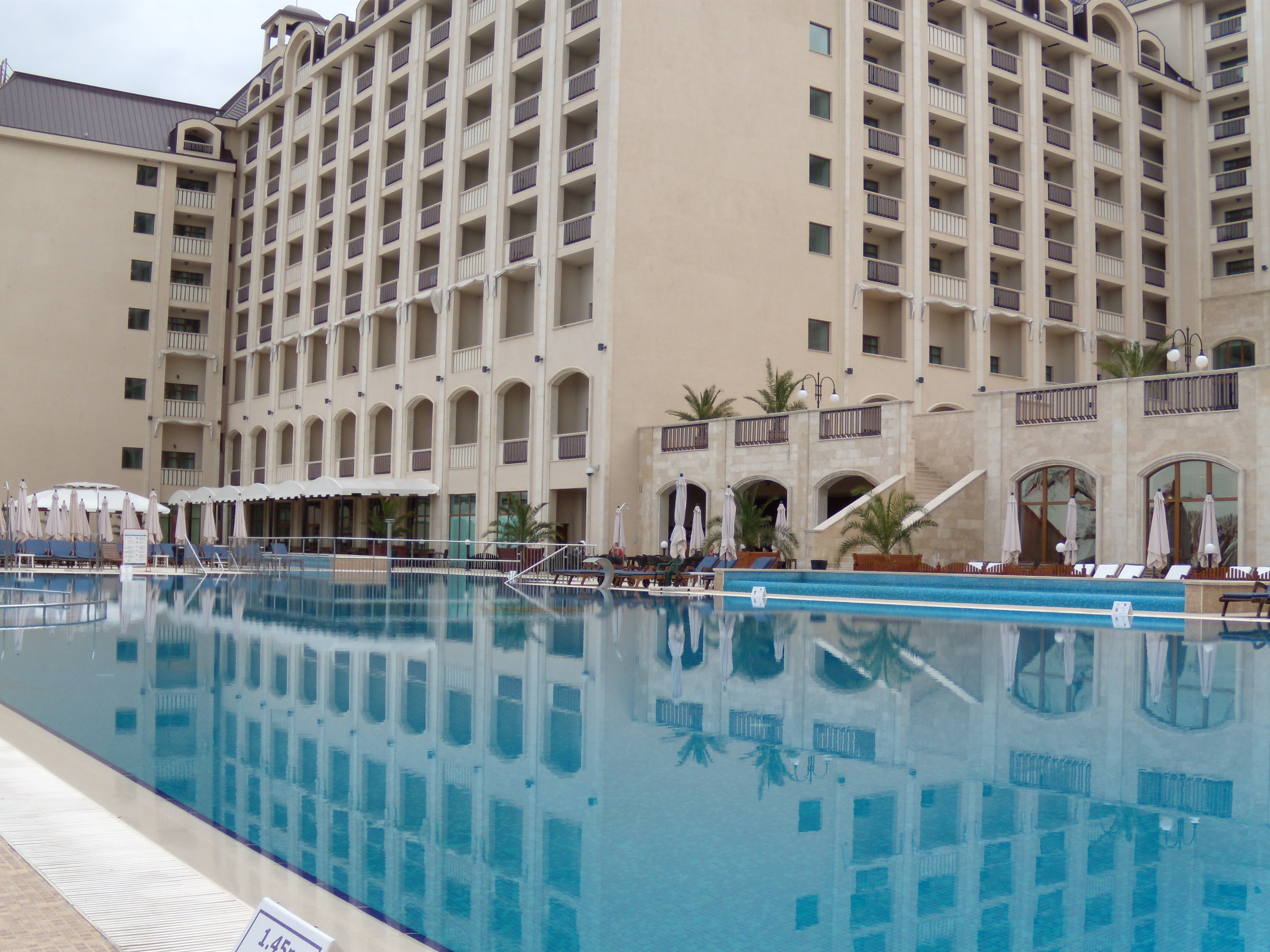

- Location within Bulgaria
- Hotel chain: Melia Hotels International Hotels

General information
- Location: Golden Sands, Bulgaria, 9007 Golden Sands
- Coordinates: 43.2902169°N 28.0406967°E

Other information
- Number of rooms: 697
- Number of suites: 30
- Number of restaurants: 4

Website
- www.meliagrandhermitage.com

Melia Grand Hermitage (Мелия гранд ермитаж in Bulgarian) is a 5 stars hotel in Golden Sands, Bulgaria.

Beside its close position to the beach, it is surrounded by the green park.

== See also ==
- List of hotels in Bulgaria
