= Northern district, Plovdiv =

District of Plovdiv, Bulgaria

Coordinates: 42°9′51″N 24°44′41″E

A view of the Northern district from Nebet Tepe.

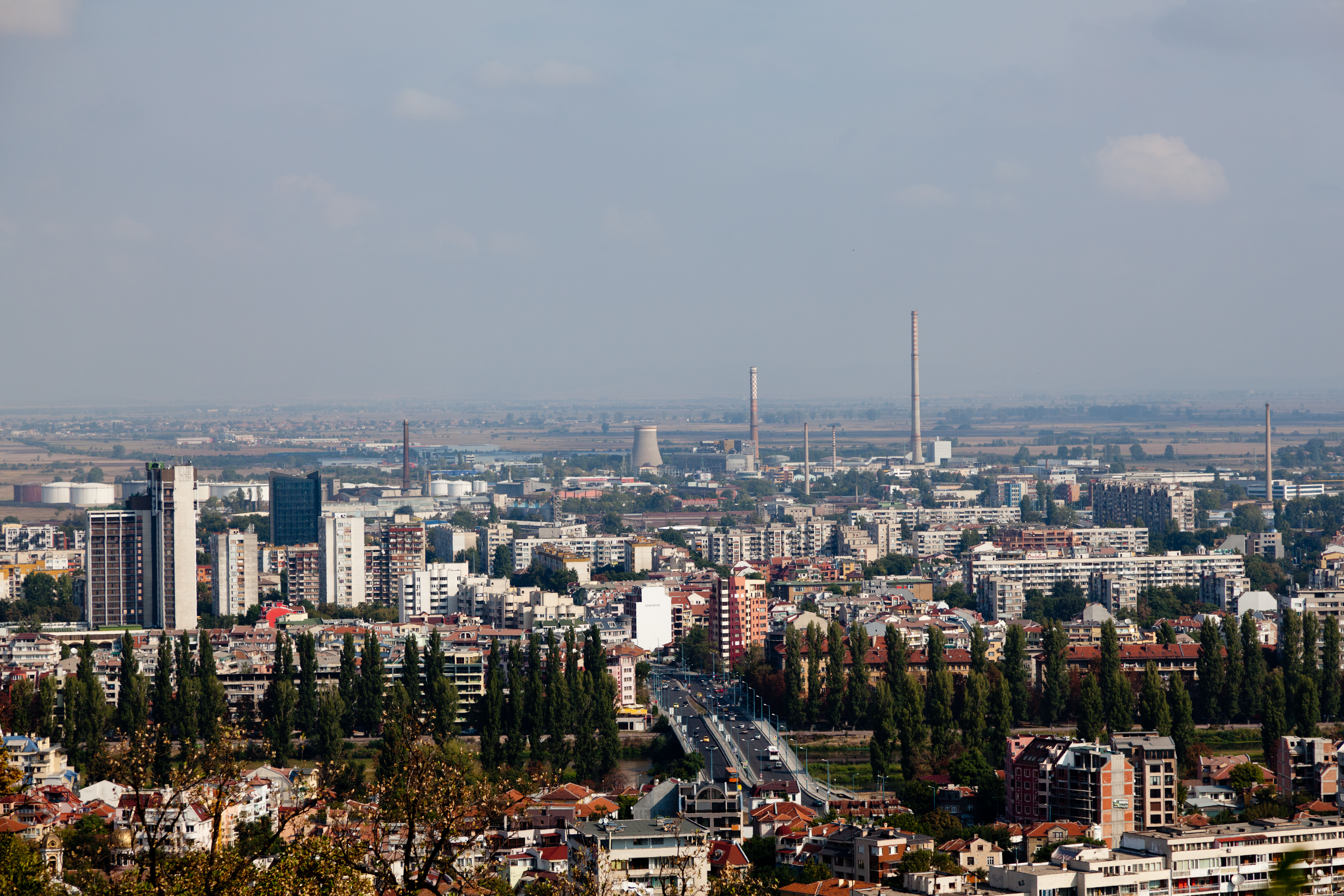
Part of the Northern district as viewed from the Liberators Hill.

Northern district (Bulgarian: Район Северен) is a district of Plovdiv, southern Bulgaria. It is often referred by the citizens as Karshiaka meaning "the other bank" in Turkish. It has 53,870 inhabitants. The district is located on the northern bank of the Maritsa river.

== Structure ==
The district includes the neighbourhoods of Jurii Gagarin, Filipovo, Zaharna Fabrikia, and Gaganitsa. The 8,000-seat stadium of FC Maritsa Plovdiv is located in the western part of the district.

The transport infrastructure includes Filipovo railway station and bus station "Sever" (meaning north in Bulgarian).

The Plovdiv International Fair is situated in the eastern parts of the district. There are three large hotels: Novotel Plovdiv, Maritsa Hotel and Sankt Peterburg Hotel (which is currently the tallest building in Plovdiv).

== Administration ==
The mayor of the Northern district is Dr Ina Filipova from the coalition GERB-IMRO – Bulgarian National Movement.

== Education ==
=== Universities ===
- Plovdiv University - the main building with most faculties.

=== Schools ===
The schools include:

- Plovdiv English Language School
- Ivan Vazov Language Schools
- Peyo Yavorov High School
