= Hotel Jumolhari =

Hotel in Thimphu, Bhutan

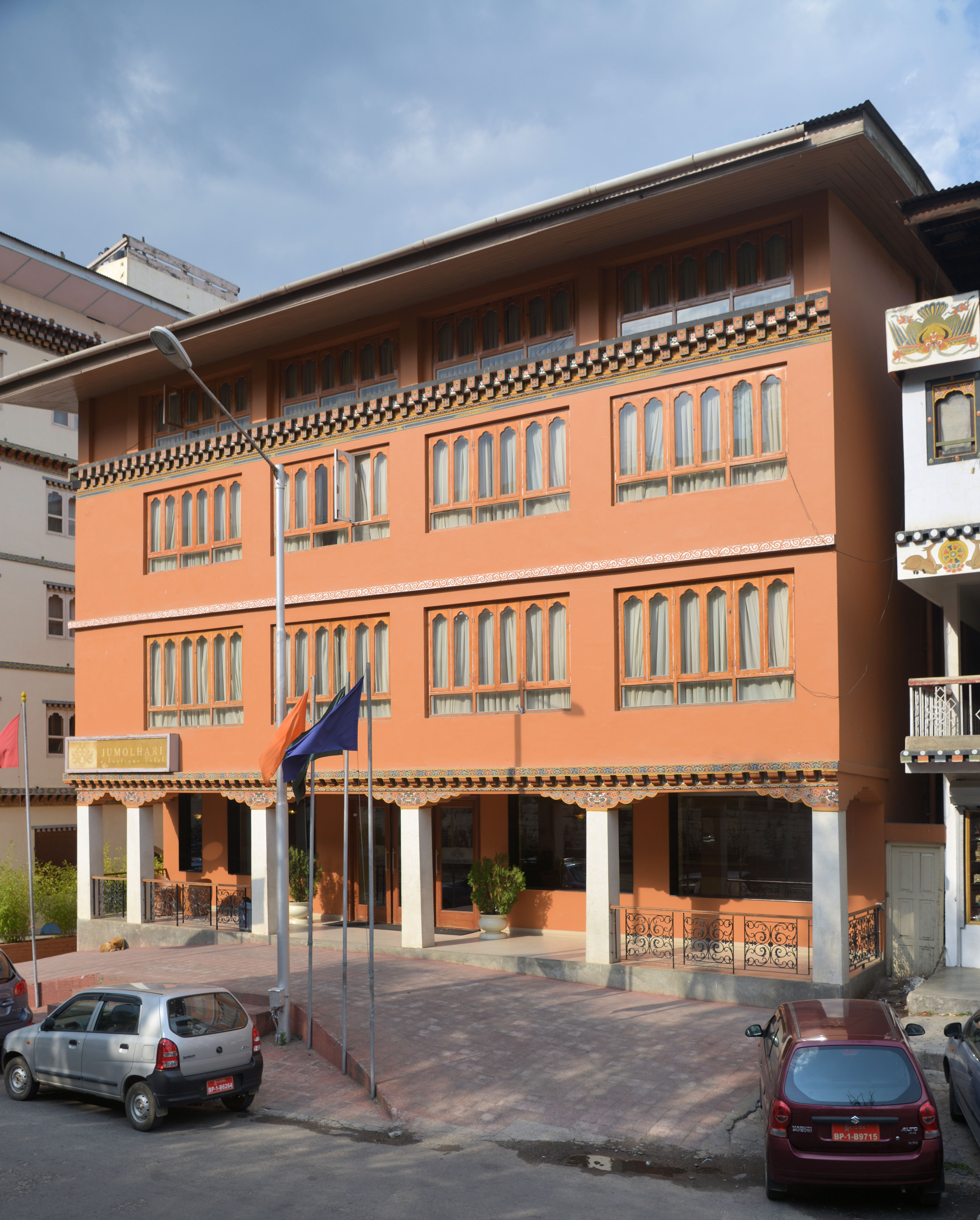

- Location within Bhutan

General information
- Location: Norzin Lam, Thimphu, Bhutan
- Coordinates: 27°28′13″N 89°38′24″E

Other information
- Number of rooms: 26
- Number of restaurants: 1

Website
- http://www.hoteljumolhari.com/

Hotel Jumolhari is a hotel in Thimphu, Bhutan, located in the heart of the city on the Chang Lam at Clock Tower Square. The hotel is situated close by the Hotel Druk and overlooks the Changlimithang Stadium. The hotel, built in the Bhutanese style, inside and out, has 26 rooms and its restaurant is noted for its Indian cuisine.
