= Plaza Resort Bonaire =

Diving resort in the southern Caribbean Island of Bonaire

Plaza Beach Resort Bonaire
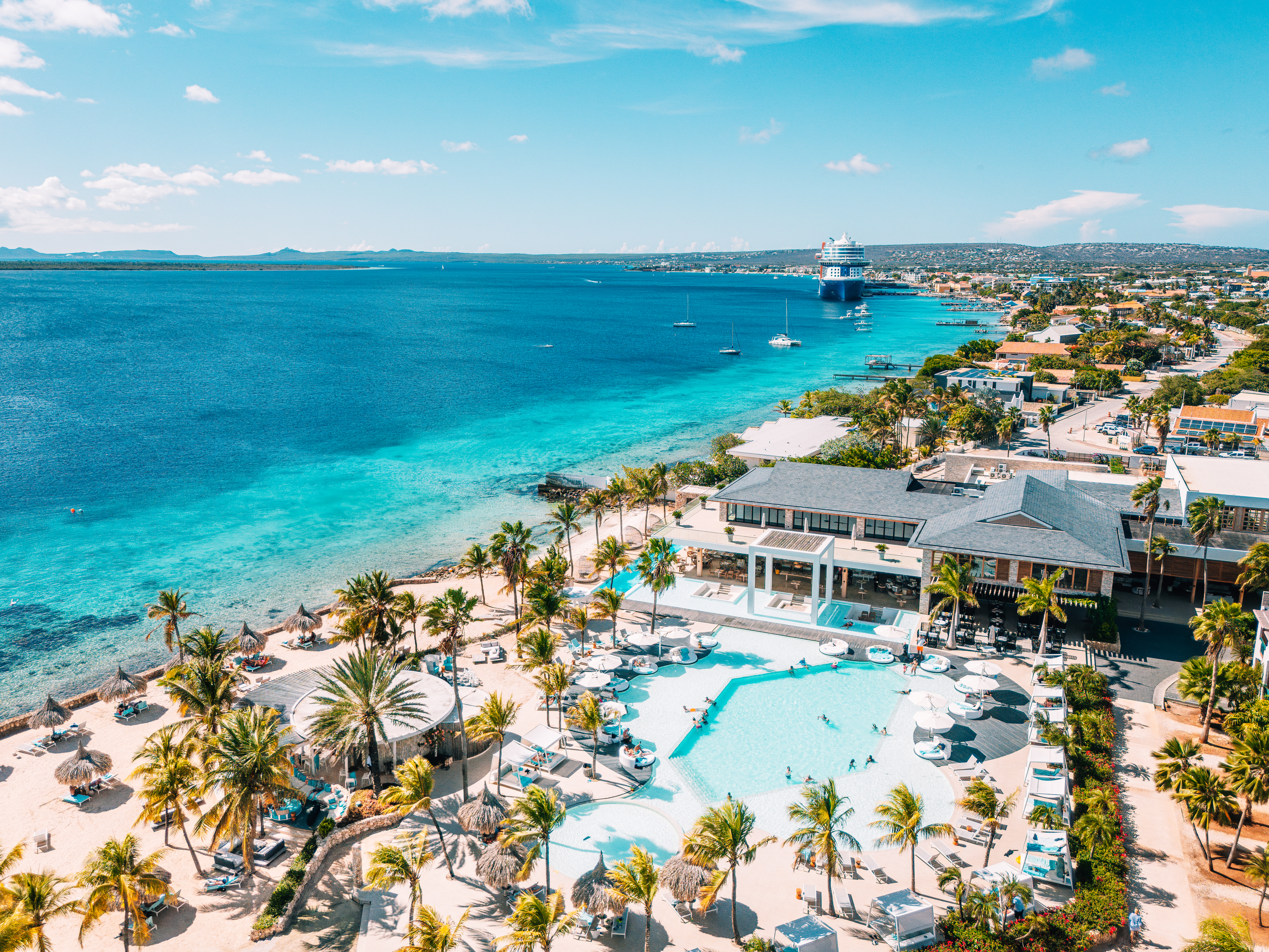
- Plaza Resort Bonaire

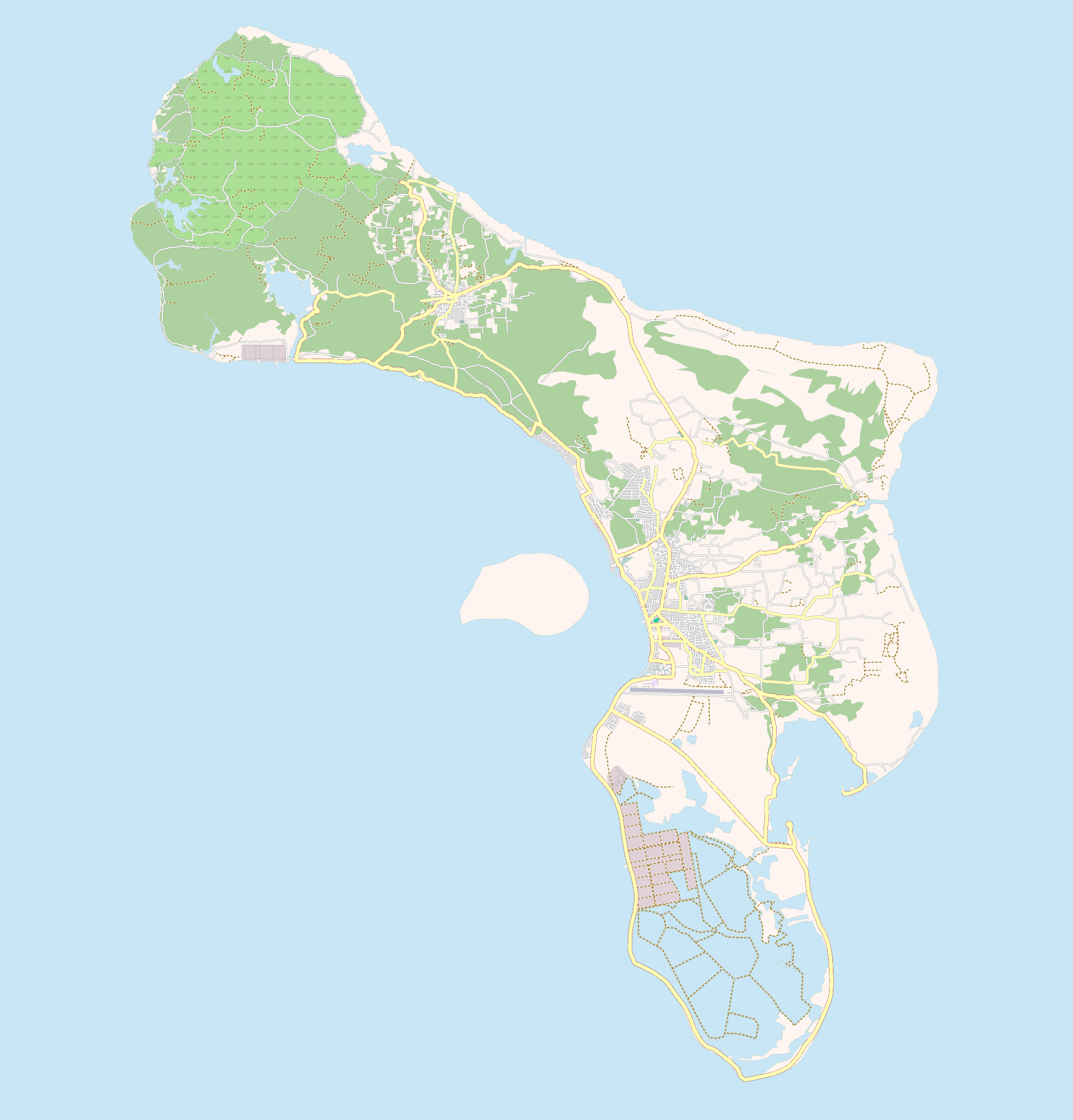
- Location within Bonaire

General information
- Coordinates: 12°8′15″N 68°16′32″W
- Owner: Van der Valk

Other information
- Number of rooms: 276

Website
- www.plazaresortbonaire.com

Plaza Resort Bonaire is the largest diving resort in the southern Caribbean Island of Bonaire, located at 80 Julio A. Abraham Boulevard, south of Kralendijk, just north of Flamingo International Airport (about 0.5 miles (0.80 km) away). It is operated by the Van der Valk family of hoteliers and is also known as the Van der Valk Plaza Resort Bonaire. The resort is situated on a peninsula, at the mouth of a man-made lagoon with turquoise blue waters. Plaza Beach Resort Bonaire Its beach measures 500 metres (1,600 ft) long and 50–100 metres (160–330 ft) deep and is a notable scuba diving location, known as Toucan Diving.

== Size ==
In 2002, the hotel contained 174 rooms and apartments, 198 rooms were reported in 2006 and 200 rooms were reported in 2007. Plaza Resort Bonaire currently has 276 rooms and suites, including hotel rooms, apartments, and penthouses. The resort also contains several swimming pools, a casino, a fitness centre, water sports facilities, and meeting and event spaces. A turquoise lagoon meanders its way through the resort. Dining facilities include two restaurants and four bars. Momento Restaurant serves breakfast, lunch, and dinner, while Piazza Limone focuses on Italian cuisine.

Activities at the resort include diving, snorkelling and other water based activities. Bonaire is known for its marine environment and protected reefs.

== Marine species ==
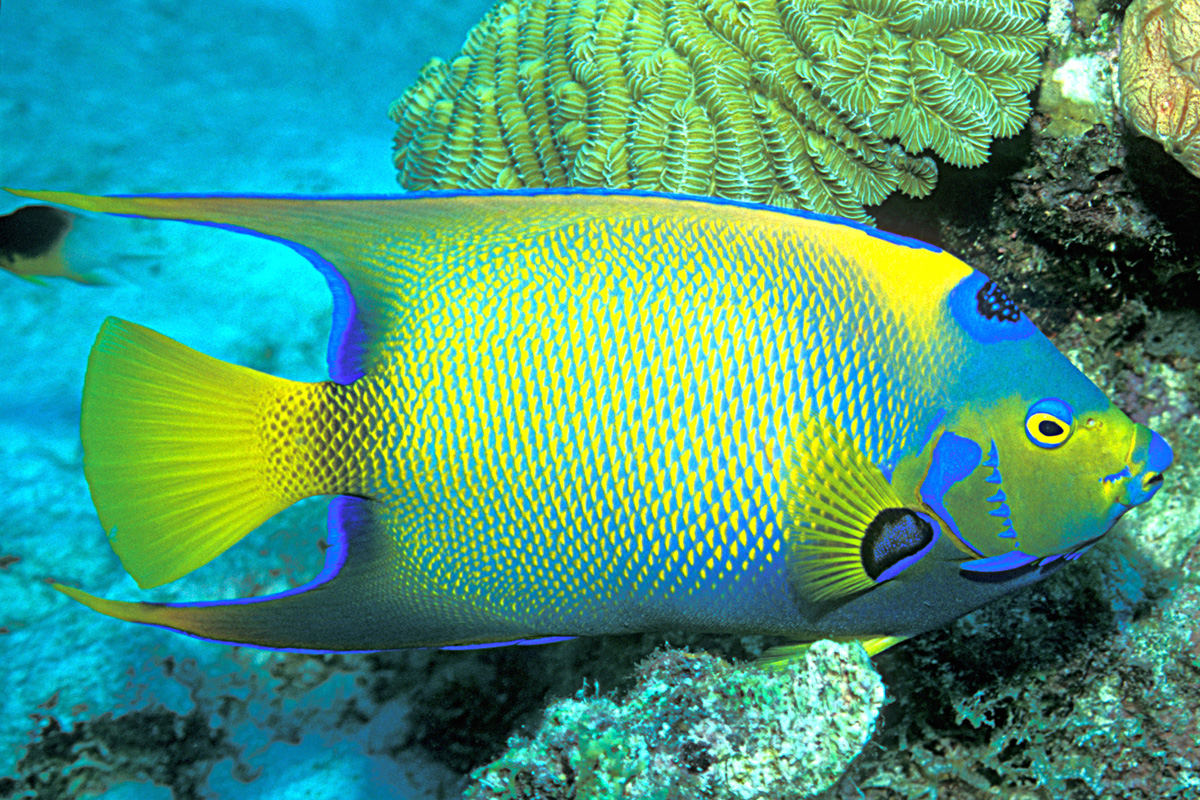
Marine species Holacanthus ciliaris seen during Scuba diving

Deep water corals seen, at depths below wave action in the lagoon, grow in the limited light that penetrates into the sea. The species variety has been conjectured as Agaricia lamarcki and Agaricia grahamae. These are seen in the form of thin plates stacked one above the other but are fragile.

Toucan Divers of the resort arrange a special diving near the Town Pier, which is a shallow dive site with colourful and varied marine life. The nightlife witnessed, of the underwater sea, is full of coral formations and marine creatures. Tarpons, the large silvery fish gets its feed as, when the flash lights used by divers attract the smaller fish species which come out and become easy prey.

== Seaquarium ==
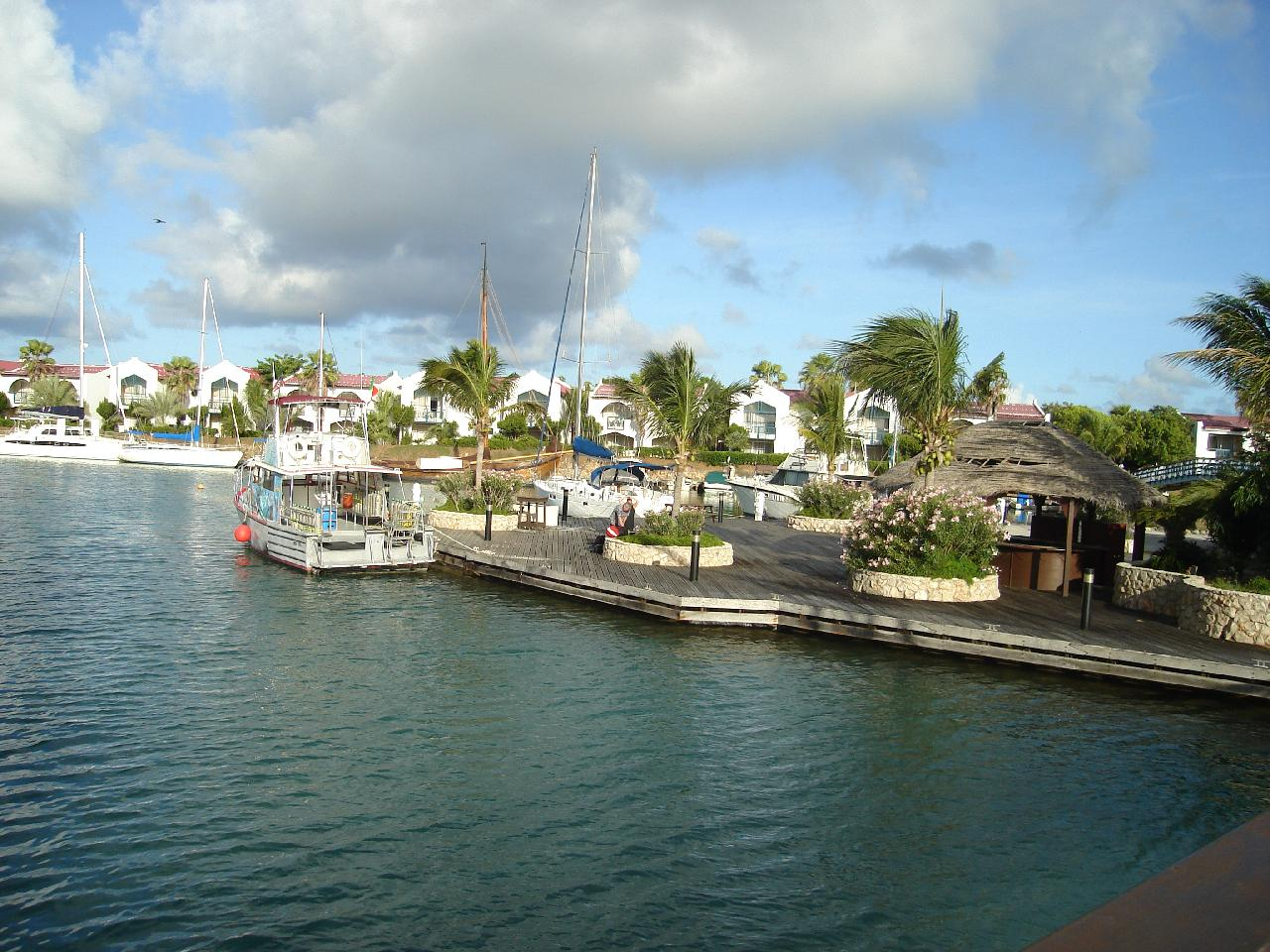
Plaza Resort Bonaire

The 10 feet (3.0 m) seaquarium built into the lagoon is the hub of training activities of the Dive and Sports Center of the resort. Boats are operated from the marina attached to the resort; the marina is planned in such a way that it does not disturb the marine environment near the lagoon.

== See also ==
- Divi Flamingo Beach Resort & Casino

== Gallery ==
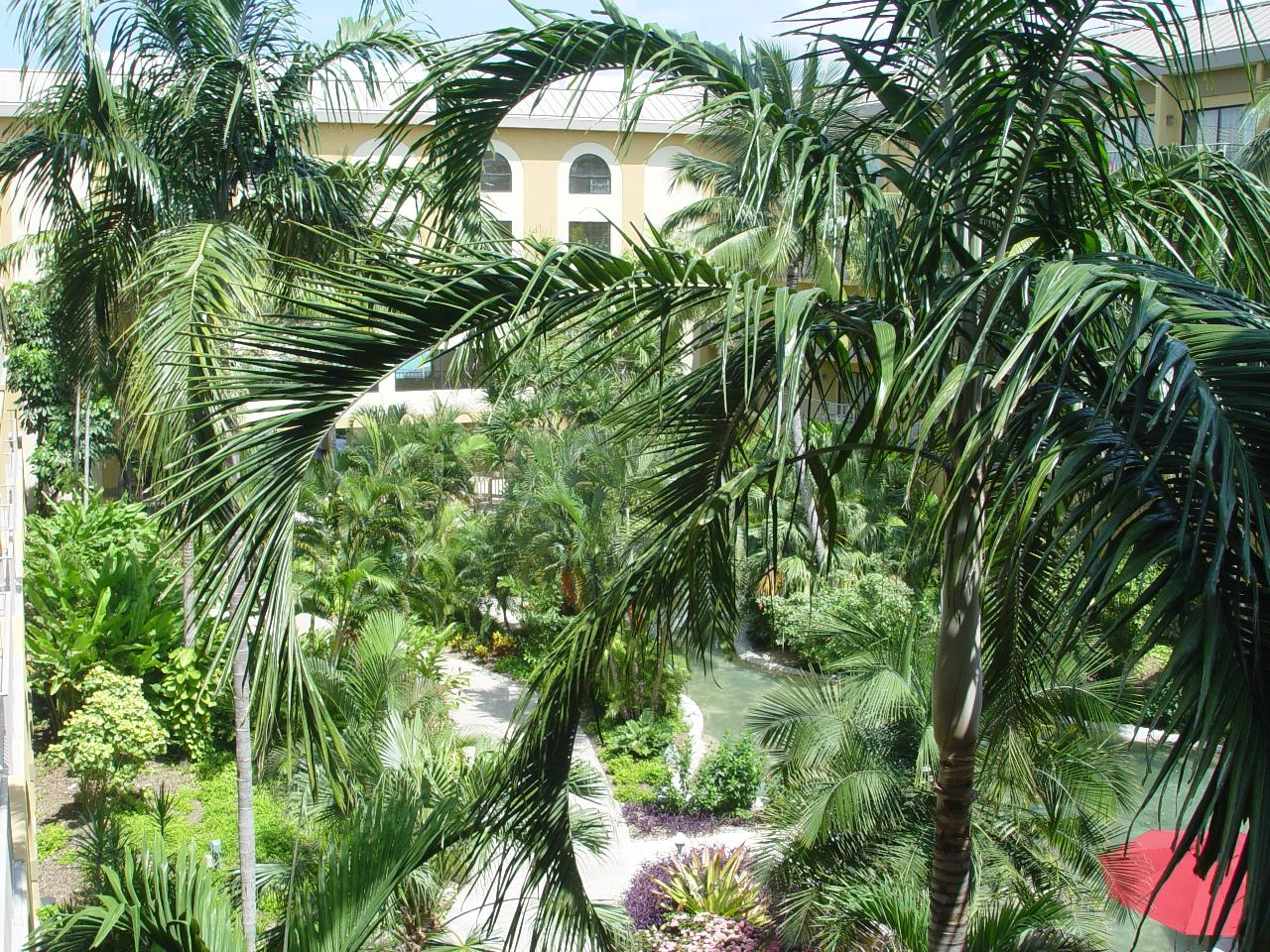
Courtyard of the Resort

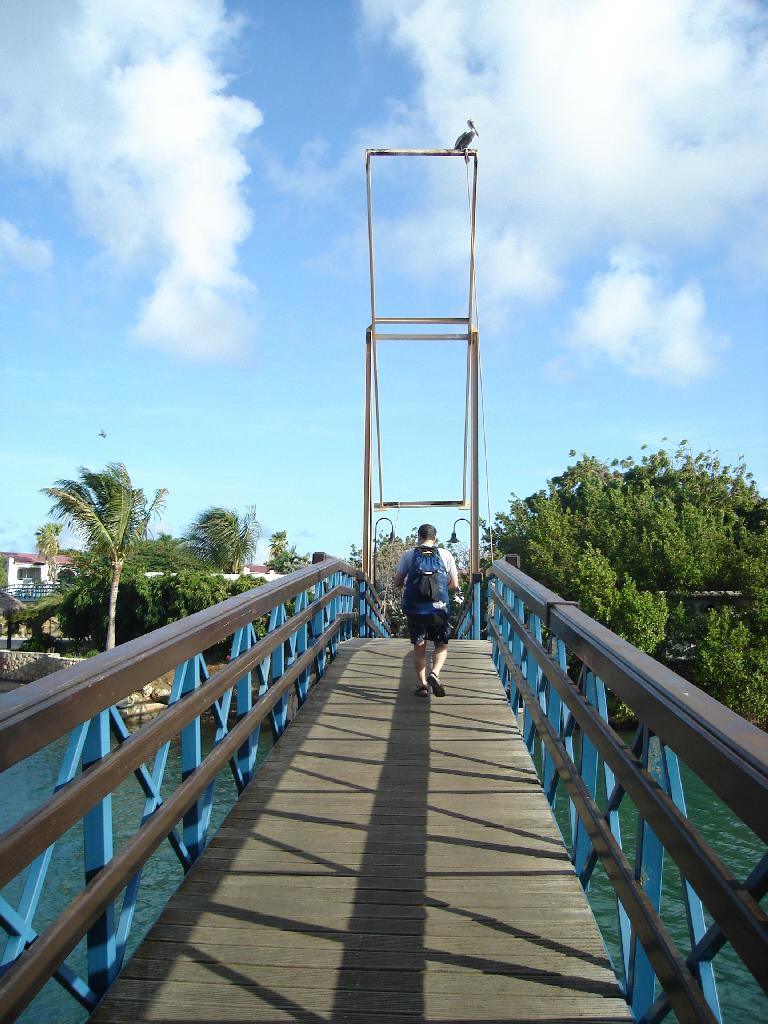
Bridge on the way to scuba diving shop near Plaza Resort Bonaire

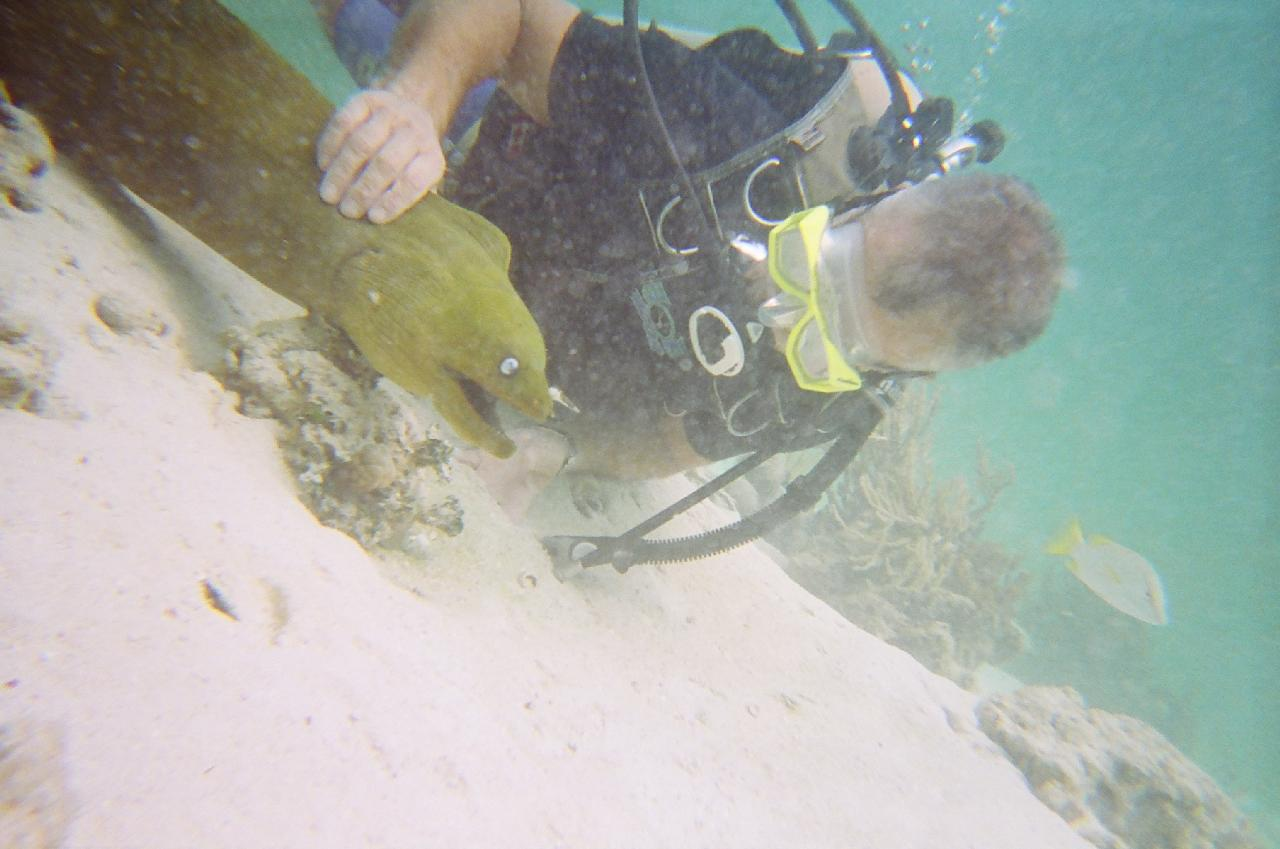
Scuba diving master with eel
