= Plaza São Rafael Hotel =

- Interactive map of the Plaza São Rafael Hotel area

General information
- Location: Avenida Alberto Bins, 514; Porto Alegre, RS, Brazil
- Coordinates: 30°1′40.83″S 51°13′17″W

Website
- plazahoteis.com.br

The Plaza Sao Rafael Hotel is located in the city of Porto Alegre. Belongs to the Network Plaza Hotel.

The hotel is one of the most famous of Rio Grande do Sul the diversity of rooms for events, especially the Jewish community, as well as exhibitions, conferences and weddings. It also has restaurants and shops.

In addition to hosting rooms in the middle, there is the Events Center Plaza São Rafael, located across the street, Avenida Alberto Bins.

The land where the hotel is currently installed, it was the first seat of the Colégio Farroupilha.
