= Copacabana Hotel Residência =

Hotel in Copacabana, Rio de Janeiro, Brazil

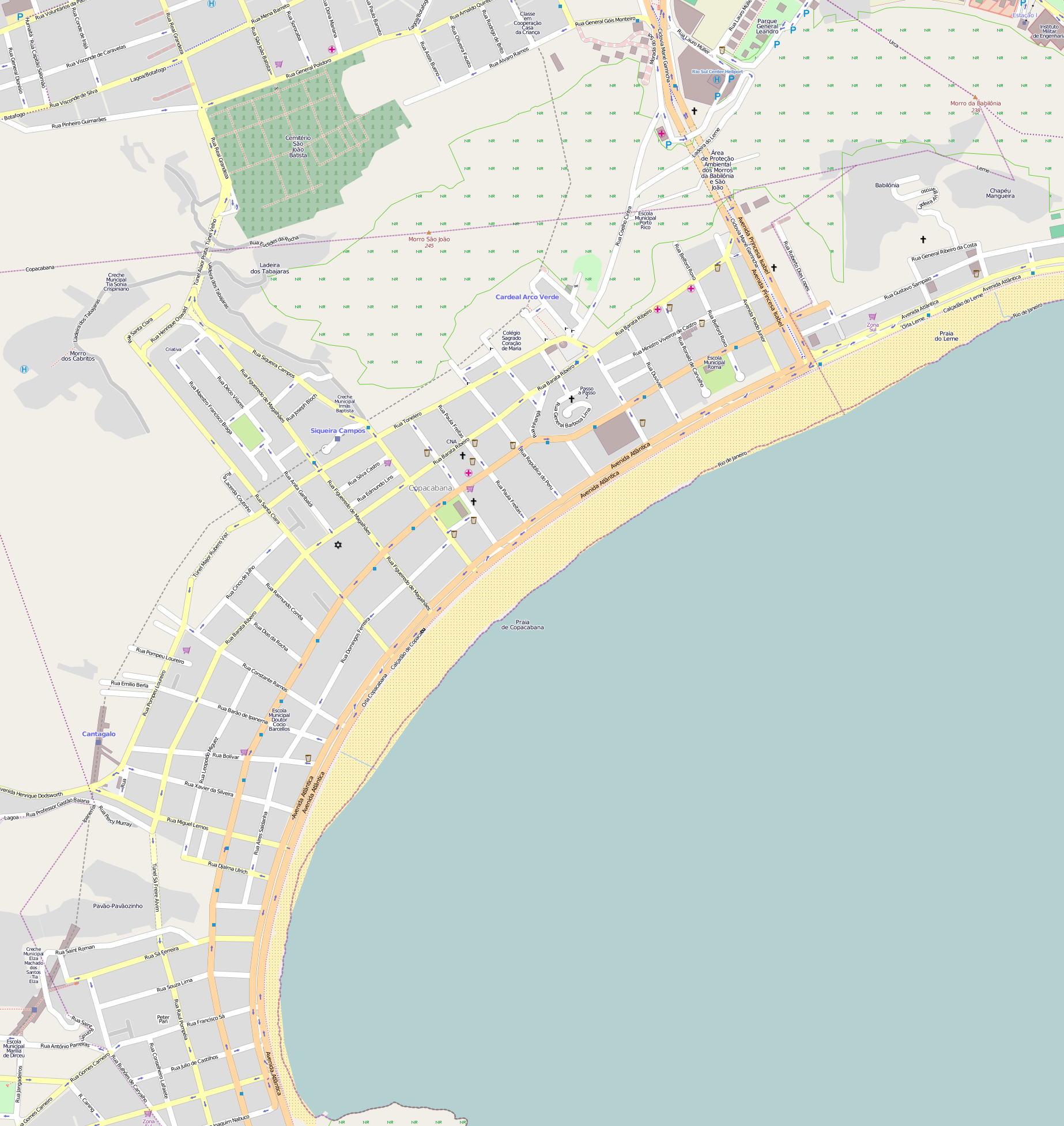
- Location within Copacabana, Rio de Janeiro

General information
- Location: Rua Barata Ribeiro 222, Copacabana, Rio de Janeiro, Brazil
- Coordinates: 22°57′55″S 43°10′52″W

Other information
- Number of suites: 120

Copacabana Hotel Residência is a hotel in Copacabana, Rio de Janeiro, Brazil, located at Rua Barata Ribeiro 222. It contains apartments which have self-service facilities, 120 suites in total.

== Reception ==
The hotel is usually sought by guests who are looking for larger rooms. Lonely Planet says "the recently renovated apartments all have tile (fake wood) floors, with a kitchen, a lounge room and a bedroom in back. The rooms are spacious enough, however the cheap furnishings don't add to the allure."
