= Hotel Bulgaria Burgas =

Business hotel in Burgas, Bulgaria

Hotel Bulgaria
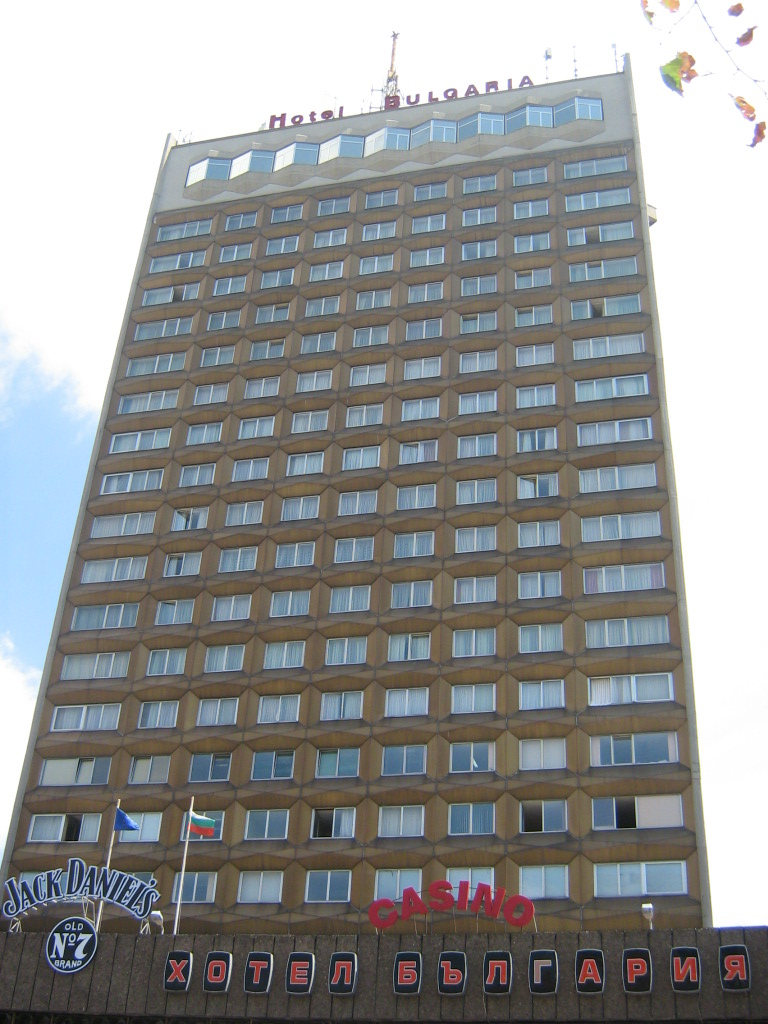

- Location within Bulgaria

General information
- Location: Burgas, Bulgaria, 21 Aleksandrovska str., 8000
- Coordinates: 42.5280536°N 27.4686354°E

Height
- Height: 71

Technical details
- Floor count: 16

Other information
- Number of rooms: 158
- Number of suites: 11

Website
- www.bulgaria-hotel.com/en-US

Hotel Bulgaria (Хотел България Бургас in Bulgarian) is a 4-star business hotel and at 71 meters, the 4th tallest building in Burgas, Bulgaria and the 27th tallest building in the country.

The hotel is located in the historic city center and provides views of the Gulf of Burgas.

== See also ==
- List of tallest buildings in Bulgaria
