= Grand Park Hotel, Mandalay =

Grand Park Hotel
- Interactive map of the Grand Park Hotel area

General information
- Status: Completed
- Type: hotel
- Location: 348 84th Road, bet. 39th & 40th streets Maha Aungmye, Mandalay 05031
- Coordinates: 21°57′45″N 96°04′27″E
- Completed: 2019
- Opening: 2019

Height
- Roof: 111.2 m (365 ft) (est.) (Note: According to Emporis, "Grand Park Hotel". Emporis., the hotel is 26 stories tall with an estimated height of 93.3 m (306 ft). But Emporis's information is dated. The hotel is 31 stories tall per "Grand Park Hotel in Mandalay". Archived from the original on 2021-05-16. Using Emporis's floor-to-floor measurement estimate of 3.588 m per floor, a 31-story building would be 111.2 m (365 ft) tall. Per (CQHP 2017: 20), the minimum required height for hotels in Myanmar is 3.2 m (10.5 ft), meaning a 31-story hotel must be at least 99.2 m (325.5 ft) tall, without accounting for lobby heights or other additional structures that add to the architectural and pinnacle heights.)

Technical details
- Floor count: 31

Website
- http://grandparkmyanmar.com/

Grand Park Hotel is a hotel located in downtown Mandalay, Myanmar. The 31-story tower is the tallest building in the country outside of Yangon. The hotel was partially opened, with 302 rooms available in September 2019, and with another 92 rooms to be ready by December 2019.

== Bibliography ==
- "Minimum Standards of Room Heights for High Rise Buildings" (PDF). CQHP, Myanmar. 23 February 2017.

Records
Preceded by Man Myanmar Plaza	Tallest Building in Mandalay; 2019–present	Incumbent
