= Bitter End Yacht Club =

Luxury resort in the British Virgin Islands

- Interactive map of Bitter End Yacht Club
- Coordinates: 18.499°N 64.357°W
- Type: Seaside resort

Construction
- Opened: 1969

Website
- www.beyc.com

The Bitter End Yacht Club is a luxury resort located in the British Virgin Islands. Situated in the protected North Sound of Virgin Gorda, the resort is only accessible by boat. The resort was founded in 1969 and destroyed in 2017 by Hurricane Irma and Hurricane Maria. It reopened in December 2021.

The Bitter End Yacht Club is a not a yacht club in the traditional sense of being composed of paying members who also organize and run the club. Instead, it is a luxury resort with a boating theme.

== History ==
Basil Symonette, a charter skipper in the Virgin Islands, purchased the land that the Bitter End sits on in the late 1960s. He built a small resort, consisting of a dock and few simple cottages. Robin Lee Graham, who set out to sail around the world alone as a teenager in the summer of 1965, spent the hurricane season of 1972 helping to build the resort. In 1973 the property was purchased from Symonette by a couple, Myron and Bernice Hokin, who had been frequent visitors since the resort's opening.

The resort expanded throughout the following decades, and by 2008 it comprised 30 beachfront villas, around 20 suites, a spa, a sailing school and marina, as well as 5 bars and restaurants.

On September 6, 2017 Hurricane Irma leveled Bitter End. The resort was redesigned and rebuilt, reopening in December 2021.

== Facilities ==
The Bitter End comprises a hotel, marina, and mooring field, as well as various beach facilities and restaurants. The marina contains 26 slips, a fuel dock, and a small dive shop.
