= Marina All Suites Hotel =

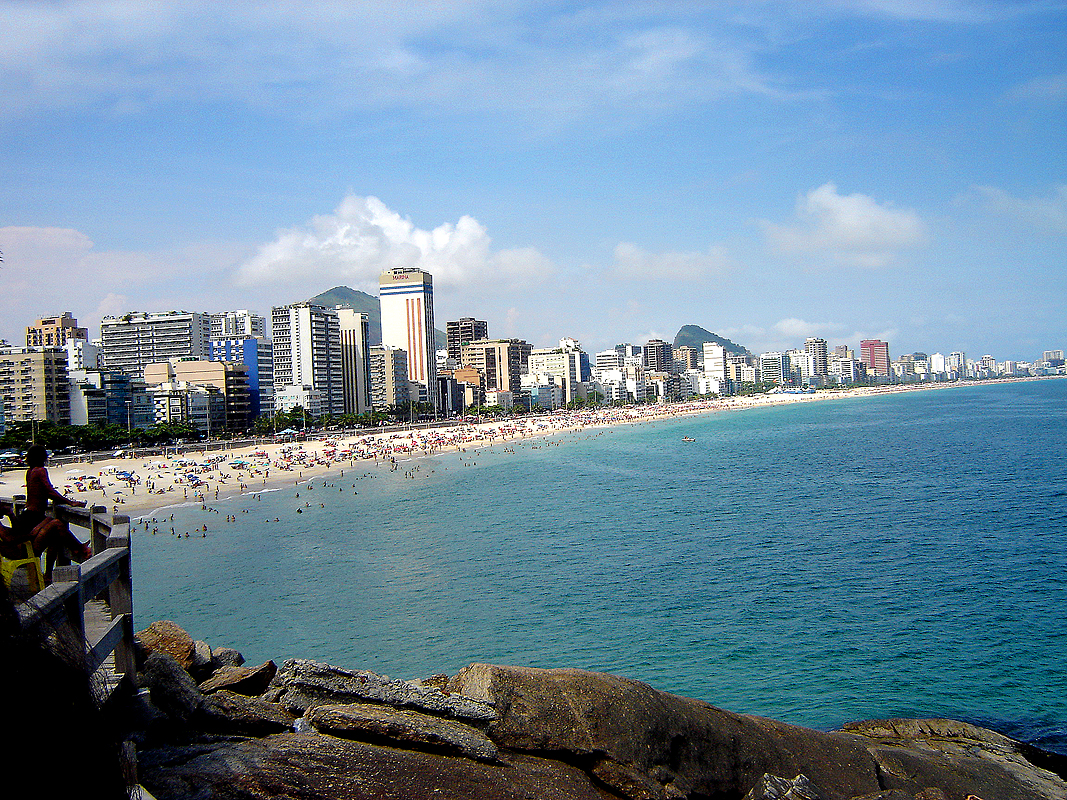
- Leblon beach. The Marina hotel is the tallest building in the picture

- Location within Rio de Janeiro

General information
- Location: Avenue Delfim Moreira 696, Leblon, Rio de Janeiro, Brazil
- Coordinates: 22°59′12″S 43°13′22″W

Marina All Suites Hotel is a luxury beach-front boutique hotel in Leblon, Rio de Janeiro, Brazil, located at Avenue Delfim Moreira 696. It is described by Frommer's as "the brainchild of a consortium of local architects and decorators who bought, gutted, and redecorated all of the rooms". During the renovation they reduced the number of rooms per floor to three to double the rooms in size. The hotel contains a notable restaurant named Bar d' Hotel, described as one of the trendiest in the city. The two-bedroom "Suite Diamante" is said to be the favorite room of supermodel Gisele Bündchen when she is in Rio de Janeiro.

The hotel was designed by Andreas Salazar Barbosa and built by Osborne Costa Construtora, in the early 2000s.
