= Hotel Wangchuck =

Hotel in Thimphu, Bhutan

Coordinates: 27.5011283°N 89.6404445°E

- Interactive map of the Hotel Wangchuck area

General information
- Location: Chang Lam, Thimphu, Bhutan
- Opening: 1974

Other information
- Number of rooms: 20
- Number of restaurants: 1

Hotel Wangchuck is a hotel in Thimphu, Bhutan, located in the heart of the city on the Chang Lam, overlooking the Changlimithang Stadium. The hotel, named after the Bhutanese King at the time, Jigme Singye Wangchuck, currently King-Father, and has 20 rooms and a restaurant serving a variety of cuisines.
