= Hotel Atlantico Praia =

Hotel in Copacabana, Rio de Janeiro, Brazil

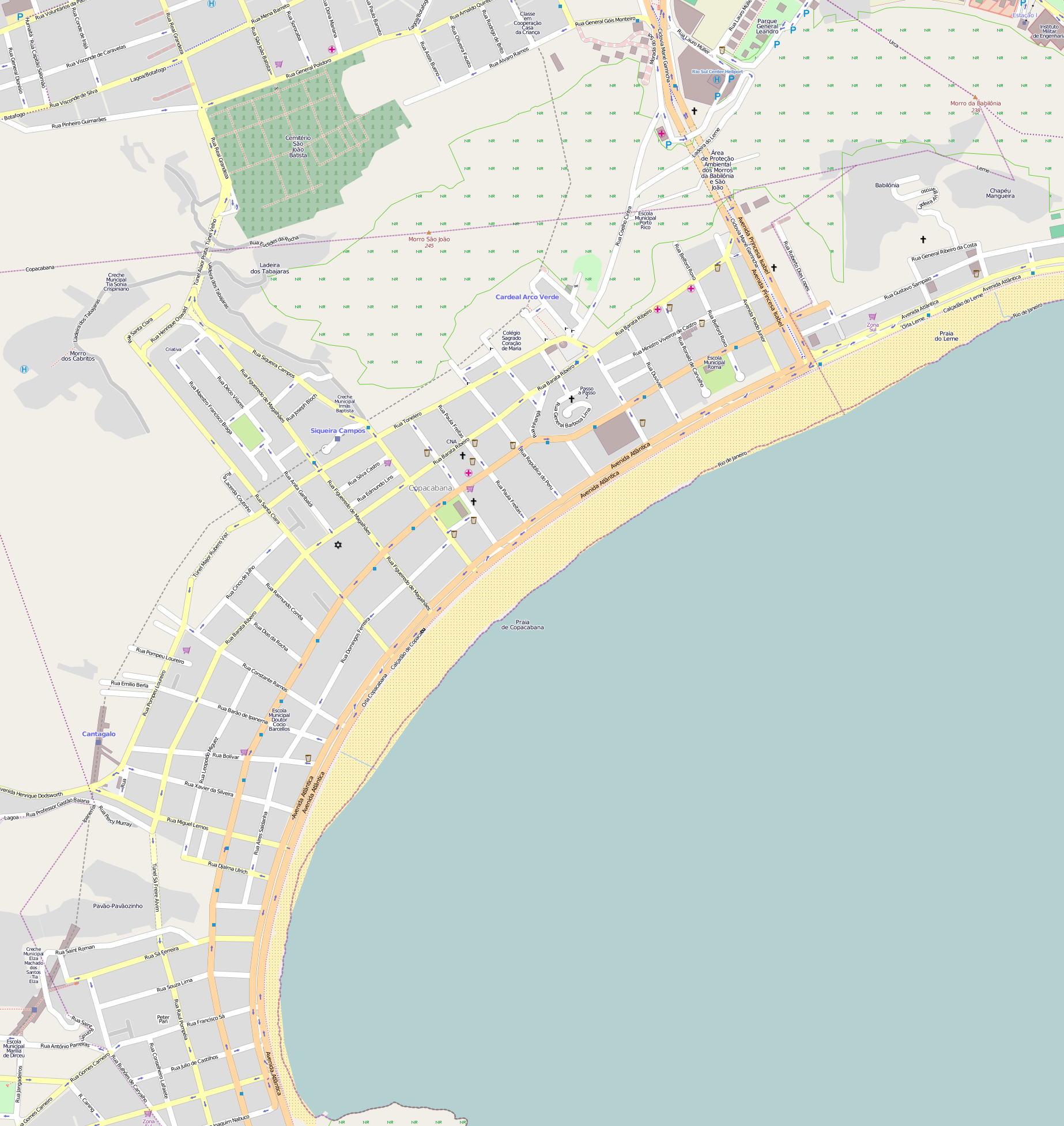
- Location within Copacabana, Rio de Janeiro

General information
- Location: Avenida Atlântica, 1456, Copacabana, Rio de Janeiro, Brazil
- Coordinates: 22°57′58″S 43°10′37″W

Other information
- Number of rooms: 64
- Number of suites: 15

Website
- www.atlanticopraia.com.br

The Hotel Atlantico Praia, formerly the Ouro Verde Hotel, is a small hotel in Copacabana, Rio de Janeiro, Brazil. At one time the Ouro Verde was considered one of the world's best small hotels, and the restaurant had a high reputation. Over time it lost some of its lustre, but it has recently been renovated.

== Building ==
The Atlantico Praia was formerly the Ouro Verde Hotel. (Note: The name "Ouro Verde Hotel" literally means the Green Gold Hotel.) It is located at 1456 Avenida Atlântica. The building dates to the 1950s. The architecture shows French influence, with Art Deco style. There are 64 large rooms. The 15-story building is listed by the National Institute of Historic and Artistic Heritage (Patrimônio Histórico). The Restaurante Ouro Verde faces the beach and serves breakfast, lunch and dinner. Darrell's Café on the sidewalk has bar service and coffee shop fare. The hotel is immediately next door to the Lancaster Hotel.

== History ==
The Ouro Verde was known as one of the world's great small hotels during most of the 1950s and 1960s. In the early 1960s the hotel was considered "posh" and was often visited by English-speakers. A visitor in 1966 described the Ouro Verde on Copacabana as an old hotel that was almost unknown to tourists but very popular with business people. It was small, clean, very well run and had an excellent restaurant. A retired Swiss hotel manager and his wife operated it as their pension. It was adjacent to large luxury hotels that were well-known by the tourists.

Brazil moved its government from Rio to Brazilia in 1960s, and the city decided to compensate by helping the tourist industry. Every year during the high tides Copacabana beach had to be closed, traffic was interrupted and several streets were flooded. Between 1960 and 1970 the shoreline was modernized, with a wider beach, broad sidewalks and hotel upgrades and new construction. The restaurant at the Hotel Ouro Verde was among the elegant and expensive dining places that provided good food and good service to the local elite, executives and foreign guests, other being O Bife de Ouro in the Copacabana Palace Hotel and Le Bec Fin.

In 1974 it was possible to dine on the patio outside the hotel. Room rates were considerably higher than the neighboring Lancaster Hotel. In 1979 the restaurant was famous for its seafood. In the 1980s the hotel was described as "aging but classy". The hotel was air conditioned. A tunnel ran from the hotel underneath the Avenida Atlantica to the beach, so guests could avoid risking their lives crossing the busy street. At that time there was no social safety net in Brazil, there was extreme poverty and tourists walking along the beachfront had to watch for pickpockets and were constantly accosted by beggars and prostitutes. The hotel had security staff permanently stationed on each floor. A 1982 article recommended the restaurant on the second floor of the hotel for a gourmet continental meal.

The famous soccer player Pelé rarely gave press interviews, apart from one for the Brazilian edition of Playboy in 1980, and a second in 1993 in his suite at the Ouro Verde Hotel. By 2007 the hotel was no longer as fashionable as in its heyday but provided good value and a quiet, traditional environment. The 2009 Rough Guide to Rio de Janeiro said the hotel exterior was not impressive, but the interior was "discreetly elegant with spacious and well-kept rooms". It recommended the more expensive rooms with the sea views. A 2011 travel guide said the hotel was considered one of the most convenient of the many hotels along Copacabana beach. It had spacious and rather old-fashioned rooms with carpets that were rather worn out. There was a panoramic view of the ocean, at least from the "luxo" rooms. Since then the hotel, now the Atlantico Praia, has been renovated.

== Sources ==
- ATLANTICO PRAIA (ex Ouro Verde) - Copacabana - RJ, Johnson Tour
- Buck, Stephen M. (2012-06-29), Trial by Fire: Tales From The Dawn of The Computer Age, Outskirts Press, ISBN 978-1-4327-9472-9
- Hewitt, Ewan C. (2014-01-16), Rolling Around the World: An Autobiography, Xlibris Corporation, ISBN 978-1-4931-4025-1
- Hotel (in Portuguese), Hotel Atlantico Praia
- Kleinfield, Sonny (2014-04-29), The Hotel: A Week in the Life of the Plaza, Open Road Media, ISBN 978-1-4804-8470-2
- Leighton, Frank (2016-12-21), Plans, Ports and Politics: 50 Years Helping Build British Columbia and the World, Trafford Publishing, ISBN 978-1-4907-7913-3
- Levine, Robert M.; Crocitti, John J. (1999), The Brazil Reader: History, Culture, Politics, Duke University Press, ISBN 0-8223-2290-0
- Marshall, Oliver; Coates, Robert (2009-11-02), The Rough Guide to Rio de Janeiro, Rough Guides, ISBN 978-1-4053-8016-4
- Robinson, Alex; Pickard, Christopher (2007-10-15), DK Eyewitness Travel Guide: Brazil, Dorling Kindersley US, ISBN 978-0-7566-4861-9
- Steele, Howard (2001), Food Soldier, RavensYard Publishing, Ltd., ISBN 978-1-928928-01-0
- Stern, Steve (September 1982). "Cruising with a South American Beat". Cruise Travel. Lakeside Publishing Co. p. 24. ISSN 0199-5111.
- St. Louis, Regis (1 August 2008), Rio de Janeiro, Lonely Planet, ISBN 978-1-74104-867-4
- St. Louis, Regis (2011-11-07), Brasile (in Italian), EDT srl, ISBN 978-88-6040-940-9
- Swartzendruber, H. Dwight (2012-11-01), Forty Years of Service Beyond Our Borders, Masthof Press, ISBN 978-1-60126-363-6
- Zoladz, Marcia (2016-09-02), Rio de Janeiro: A Food Biography, Rowman & Littlefield Publishers, ISBN 978-1-4422-5232-5
