= Hotel Shaibal =

- হোটেল শৈবাল

General information
- Status: Operational
- Location: Parjatan Holiday Complex, Motel Road, Baharchhara, Cox's Bazar, Bangladesh
- Coordinates: 21.4354624°N 91.9709357°E
- Opening: 1983
- Owner: Ministry of Civil Aviation and Tourism
- Operator: Bangladesh Parjatan Corporation

Technical details
- Floor count: 3

Website
- parjatan.gov.bd/pages/static-pages/6922e060933eb65569e26c02

Hotel Shaibal is a hotel operated by the Bangladesh Parjatan Corporation. Located in Cox's Bazar, Bangladesh, the government-owned hotel was built in 1983.

== History ==
In 1965, the Sagarika Restaurant was established in Cox's Bazar, which later became a popular restaurant in the city. In 1973, the government established the Bangladesh Parjatan Corporation. In 1983, the organization converted the restaurant into a hotel covering an area of 350 acres. At the time, it was the largest hotel in Bangladesh. In 2020, 50 acres of the hotel's land was transferred for the construction of the Cox's Bazar District Indoor Stadium. In 2016, the government sought to implement a plan to renovate the hotel and turn it into a five-star hotel, but later backed away from implementing it. The government estimated ৳8 billion for the plan.

In 2017, a signboard of the Orion Group was installed on the hotel's land. Subsequently, words spread that 130 acres of the hotel's land had been secretly leased to the Orion Group for only ৳600 million allegedly. It was learned that the organization was attempting to have the hotel land transferred at a low price by bribing officials of the Bangladesh Parjatan Corporation, and that officials opposing the decision had been threatened. After the rumors spread, dissatisfaction arose among local residents. Local residents began protesting against the decision. As a result, the Ministry of Civil Aviation and Tourism arranged a meeting on 22 January 2018 regarding the matter.

The following day, A. K. M. Shahjahan Kamal, the Minister for Civil Aviation and Tourism, visited Cox's Bazar to resolve the issue. As a result, the signboard was removed in 30 January. After a resident of Cox's Bazar filed a complaint alleging that the hotel's land was being secretly transferred at a low price, the Anti-Corruption Commission ordered action in February. The government subsequently cancelled the initiative to lease the land. Then, in 2023, the government formed a committee tasked with identifying to whom the land included in the hotel had been leased and who was using it. However, the committee was unable to submit its report because it could not find the hotel's plans, which sources in the Ministry of Civil Aviation and Tourism and the Bangladesh Parjatan Corporation told Prothom Alo had been removed by an unscrupulous group.

In 2026, the government planned to transform the hotel into an international-standard integrated tourism complex under a public–private partnership, with an estimated cost of ৳Tk 30 billion.

== Features ==
The hotel is situated on 135 acres of land. The hotel has three floors. Its facilities include the Sagarika Restaurant, a swimming pool, the two-storey restaurant named Live Fish, and a golf bar.

It is known as a storage site for a syndicate involved in supplying illegally imported foreign liquor and beer. In 2017 and 2020, the Department of Narcotics Control conducted raids at the hotel for storing illegal liquor and beer and arrested those involved in the offenses.
