= Pook's Hill =

Coordinates: 17°9′16″N 88°51′8″W

Pook's Hill is a private forest reserve, bird sanctuary, and archaeological site in Cayo District, Belize, 12 miles (19 km) west of Belmopan. The Mayan site contains temples, a plazuela, midden, banquet hall, and burial sites. Facilities within the reserve include Pook's Hill Lodge, an ecotourism resort.

== Geography ==
Pook's Hill is located within a 300 acres (120 ha) forest reserve, in the Maya Mountains foothills. Pook's Hill Reserve, which is listed with Belize Association of Private Protected Areas, adjoins the Tapir Mountain Nature Reserve. It is situated 12 miles (19 km) southwest of Belmopan and 21 miles (34 km) northeast of San Ignacio. From Belmopan, there is signage near Teakettle village. Other archaeological sites in the area include Caracol, Tikal, Xunantunich, and Cahal Pech.

== Archaeology ==
Pook's Hill contains ancient ruins of a Mayan site. The Mayan residential complex dates to around 830-950 AD. The site has been excavated by members of the Belize Valley Archaeological Reconnaissance Project.

The excavations revealed four temples and also a midden. The midden is located between the temples 1 and 2A. The midden has revealed antiquaries which relate to the food habits of a common man. Temple 2A has been inferred as a banquet hall or community hall. Other antiquaries located here consisted of human teeth, images made in ceramics, and also musical instruments. Also found across the temple site were main burial sites in which skeleton remains of nine people have been found. In the caves in the region, remnants of pottery were also found which are inferred as similar to those found on the hills.

== Wildlife ==
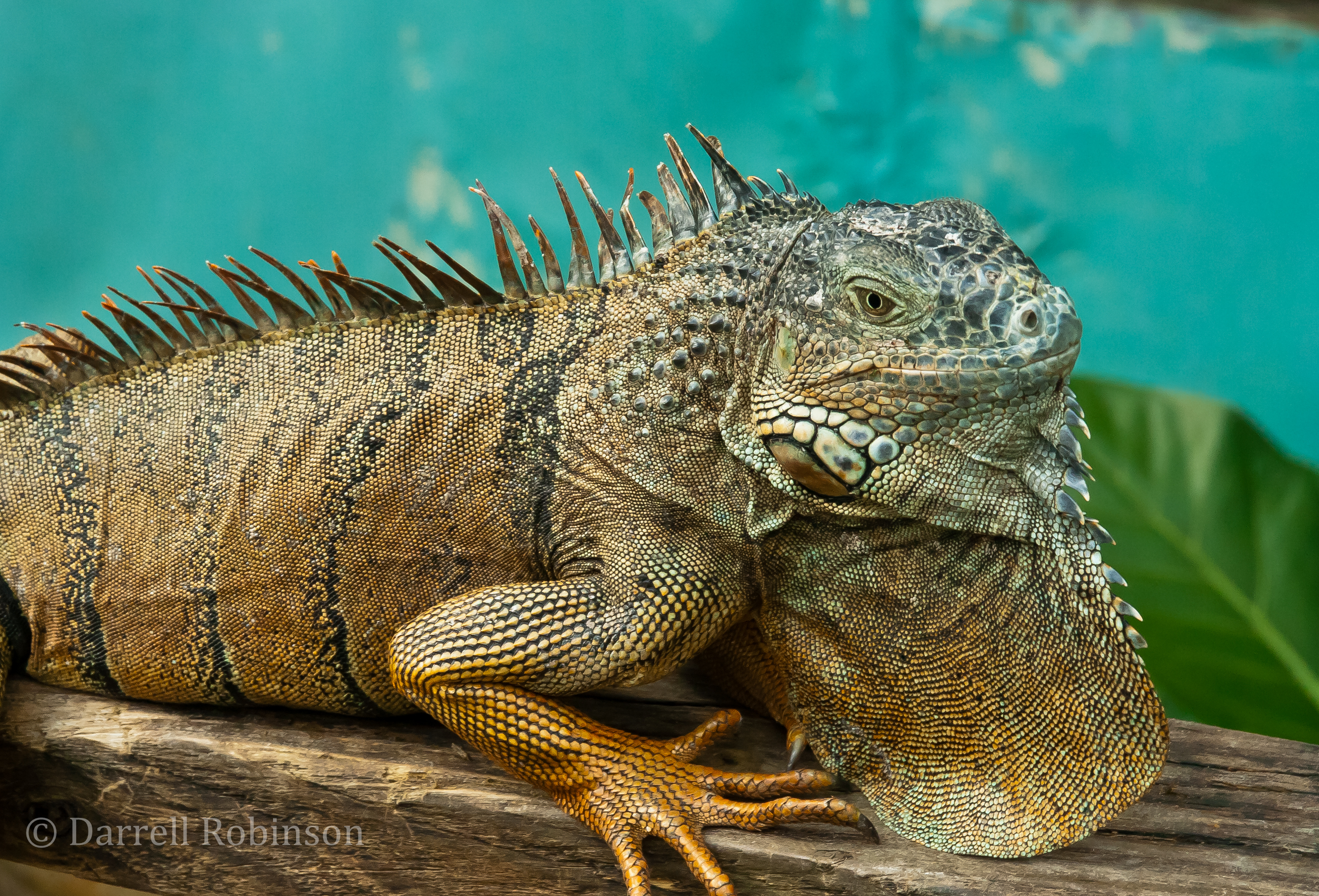
Green Iguana in the Iguana Conservation Project on the grounds of the San Ignacio Resort Hotel in San Ignacio, Belize.

Pook's Hill is a private bird sanctuary. It is set within a neotropical, moist broadleaved forest, contains hardwood and bromeliad trees. Rare bird species are noted, toucans are common, and hummingbirds, trogons, motmots, and the spectacled owl are also seen.

The San Ignacio Resort Hotel in San Ignacio established a Green Iguana Project in 1996 in order to proliferate the population of the Green Iguanas (Iguana iguana). Since then, 100 iguanas have been set free in the Pook's Hill Reserve.

== Facilities ==
The area now known as Pook's Hill was purchased in 1991 by Ray and Vicki Snaddon, who built Pook's Hill Lodge. Snaddon named it after the popular children's book “Puck of Pook's Hill”, authored by Rudyard Kipling. ‘Pook’ in the Mayan language means “hill”. The lodge has ten white-plastered cabanas with thatched roofs which are decorated with Mayan weavings. The facility's library provides information on the area's bird life.
