= Divi Flamingo Beach Resort & Casino =

Diving resort hotel and casino on the island of Bonaire

Divi Flamingo Beach Resort & Casino is a diving resort hotel and casino on the Caribbean island of Bonaire. The grounds include a scuba centre, bars, restaurants and casino reported to be the world's first "barefoot casino". The hotel has 141 rooms. The headquarters for Divi Resorts is located in Chapel Hill, NC.

== Location ==
The resort is located on the west coast of Bonaire and is very close to Kralendijk, its capital city. The pier and hotel are both situated in the town's southern section, walking distance to the center of town. Further south, there is another diving resort, Plaza Resort Bonaire. It is south of the Cactus Blue restaurant off the Kaya Grandi road, the island road which connects the airport to the resort. The beach front is about 20 yards (18 m) in front of the Divi Flamingo, to the Calabas Reef.

== History ==
The building was used during World War II to house interned German prisoners. It was converted into Bonaire's first hotel, named the Zeebad. In 1989, the resort had 110 rooms. A refurbishment in 2001 included rooms painted in bright colours and flooring laid with white tiles, with floral designs. In 2006, there were 145 rooms, a large swimming pool and landscaped gardens. As of 2013, there are 141 rooms.

== Architecture and fittings ==
Room balconies feature views of either the sea or the tropical garden. Facade walls are painted with bright colours of pink, ochre and cobalt-blue. Apart from the standard rooms, the resort has 40 suites with attached kitchens.

== Features ==
The small beach has a pier used by sunbathers, for diving and boating. The resort is cited as a notable location in the Caribbean islands for diving, and has facilities for PADI scuba diving. There is a fully equipped diving facility which can also be accessed by disabled people. Snorkeling and diving are done from the pier. The diving activity is done under professional guidance at any time during the day or night. There is also a casino which can be approached barefoot and hence known as “barefoot” casino. Other activities include Wine-and-Dine cruises, pedal-powered bikes, golf, and tennis.

== See also ==
- Plaza Resort Bonaire
