= The Reefs Hotel & Club =

Luxury resort in Bermuda

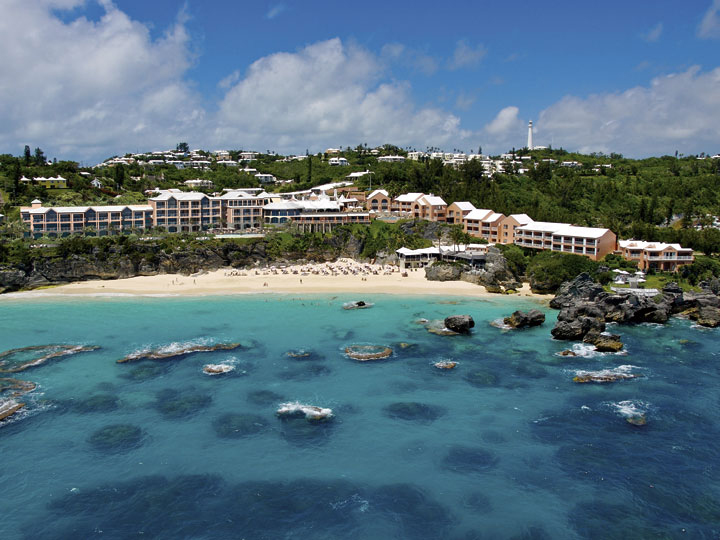

- Location within Bermuda

General information
- Location: 56 South Shore Road, Southampton Parish, Bermuda
- Coordinates: 32°14′56″N 64°50′21″W
- Inaugurated: 1947

Website
- Official site

The Reefs Hotel & Club, commonly known as The Reefs, is a luxury four-star resort hotel in Southampton Parish, Bermuda.

== History ==
It has been built around the ruins of a 1680 farmhouse at Christian Bay, Southampton, and was originally owned by Marmaduke Dando. The Reefs Beach Club, as it was known, opened its doors in 1947. It was the first cabana-style beach resort in Bermuda.

A $5 million major renovation began in the early 2000s, which added 11 suites, in-room entertainment, and Bermuda's first freshwater infinity pool. The renovations also included updates to the dining venues.

== Architecture ==
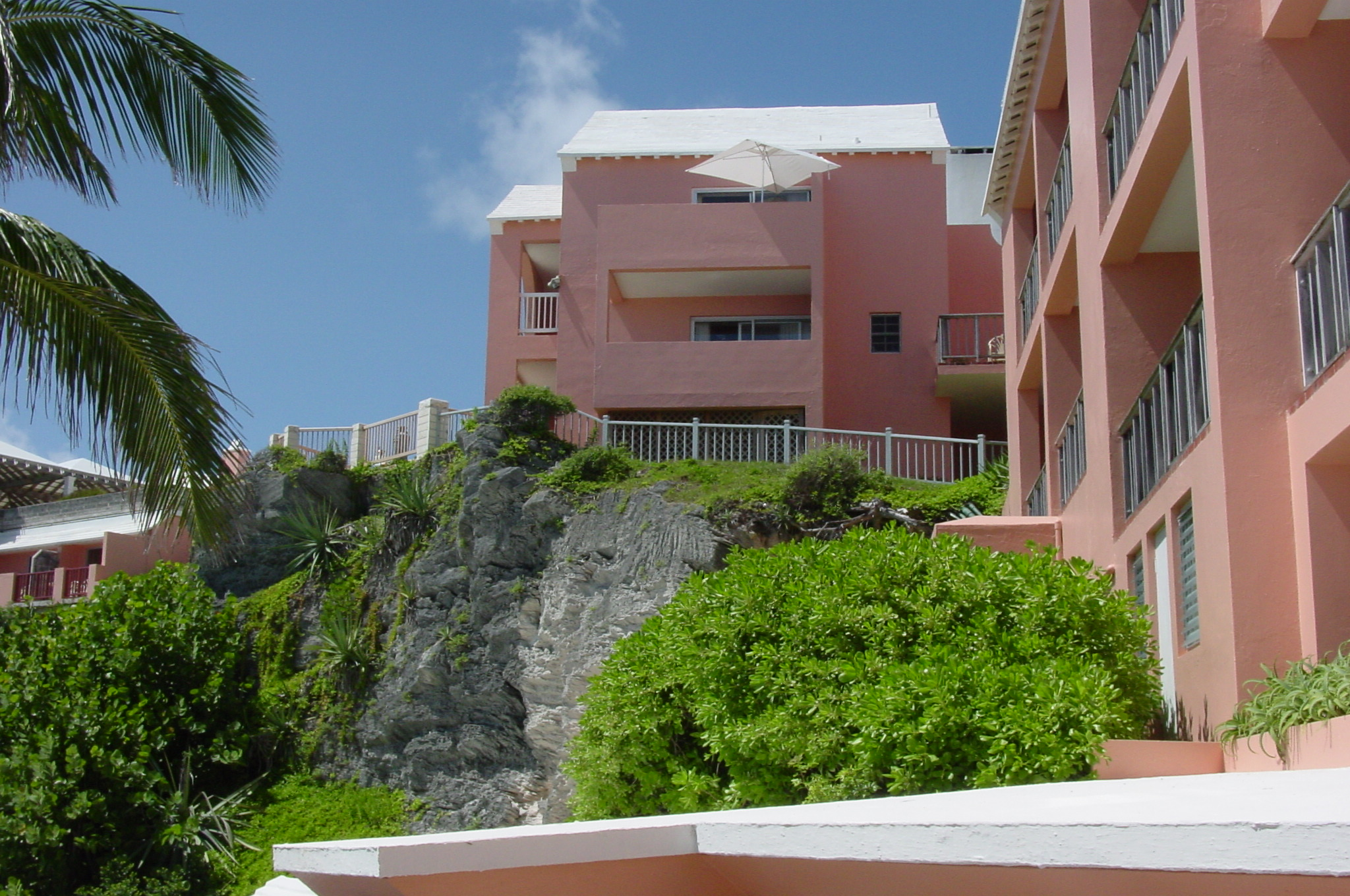
Rooms

Situated on limestone cliffs overlooking pink sand in the southeast of Bermuda, the cabana-style limestone walled buildings and cottages are noted for their distinct pink and white color.

The Reefs has 62 guest rooms, suites, and cottages, as well as 19 furnished 2- and 3-bedroom luxury Club condos. Accommodations are categorized as: poolside rooms, cliffside rooms, longtail suites, junior suites, point suites, cottages, and club condos.

=== Restaurants ===
The Reefs has two on-site restaurants, which are some of the most notable restaurants in Bermuda, and a bar. Solaris is a 180-degree-view restaurant serving continental cuisine. It offers outdoor terrace dining atop the cliff overlooking the Atlantic Ocean on the South Shore. Coconuts is an open-air restaurant, open seasonally, and located adjacent to the resort beach. It offers beach dining and a popular weekly Beach BBQ.
