= Grande Hotel de Goiânia =

Hotel in Goiânia, Goiás, Brazil

Coordinates: 16.675671°N 49.257563°E

Grande Hotel
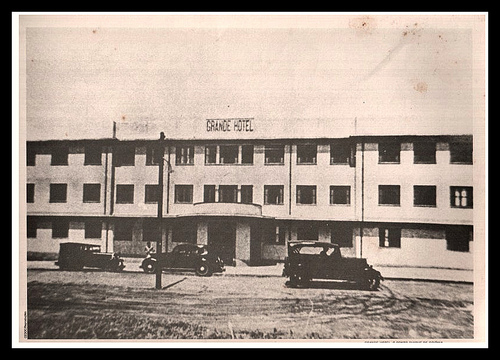
- Grande Hotel, Entrance
- Interactive map of the Grande Hotel area

General information
- Location: Goiânia, Goiás, Brazil
- Opening: 1937
- Owner: National Institute of Historic and Artistic Heritage

Technical details
- Floor count: 3
- Floor area: 2.178 M²

Design and construction
- Architect: Corrêa Lima

Other information
- Number of rooms: 60

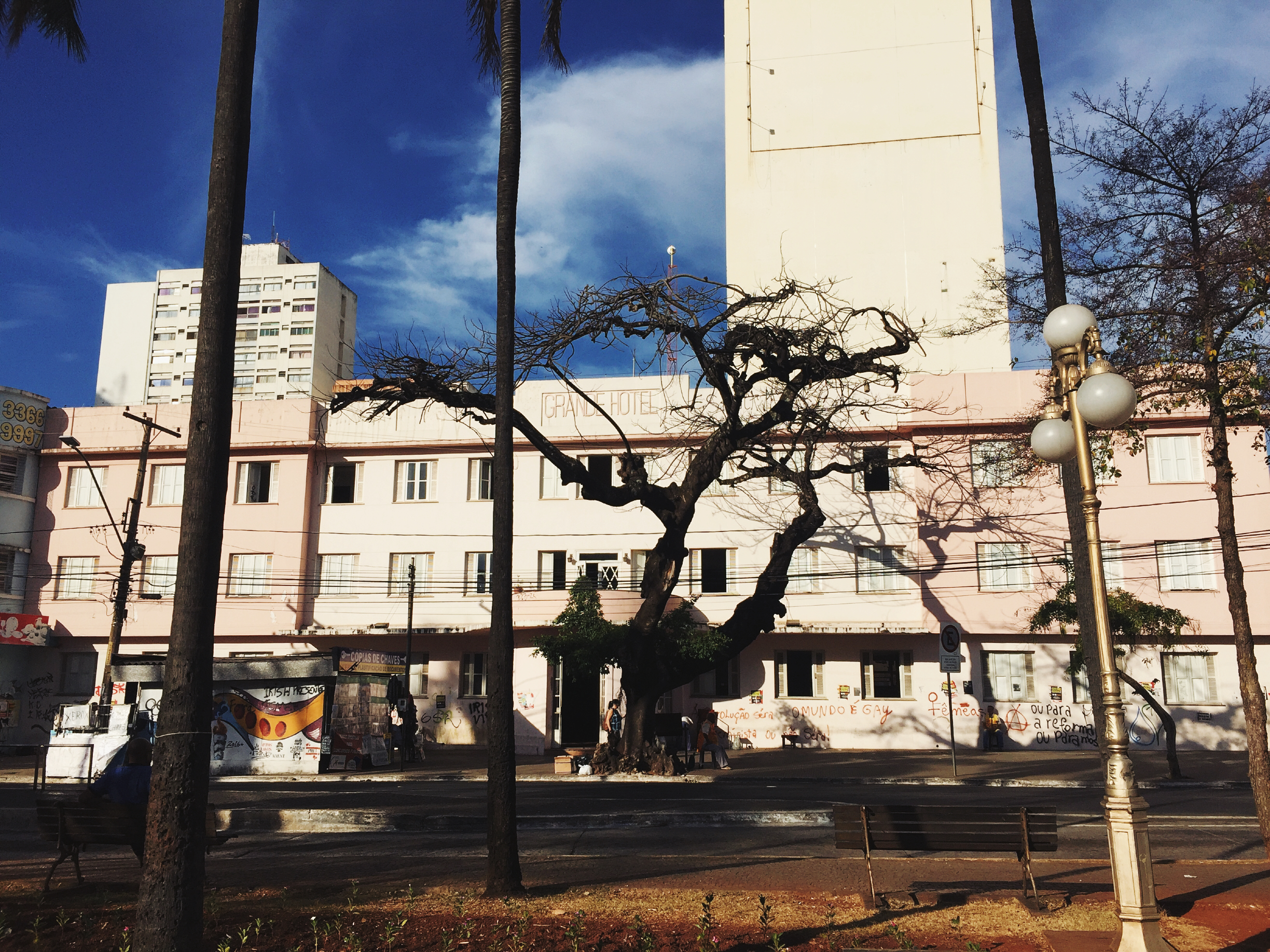
Grande Hotel in 2017

The Grande Hotel is an art Deco hotel in the Brazilian city of Goiânia. The hotel was established in 1937, when Goiânia was in its early stages of growth.

It was the first hotel in Goiânia and one of the most important buildings of the city at the time, according to Ofélia Monteiro, its main objective was: "to facilitate the entrance of elements from outside to the State and to facilitate with good facilities the stay of as many have business dealing with the government". The state government is responsible for the management.

== History ==
The building was built from the three-floor project, originally with 60 rooms and four luxury apartments, several bathrooms served by hot and cold water, as well as garages and other premises of the best establishments of this kind, in an area of 2,178 m^{2} . The restaurant-bar became, at that time, the meeting point of the Goianian society.

It was strategically positioned, between the main avenues of Avenida Tocantins, Araguaia, Araguaia, Independência, Goiás Avenue and Anhanguera Avenue. It was registered as Goiânia's historical patrimony by the National Institute of Historic and Artistic Heritage (IPHAN) on 18 November 2003.
