= Momchil Andreev =

Bulgarian businessman (born 1964)

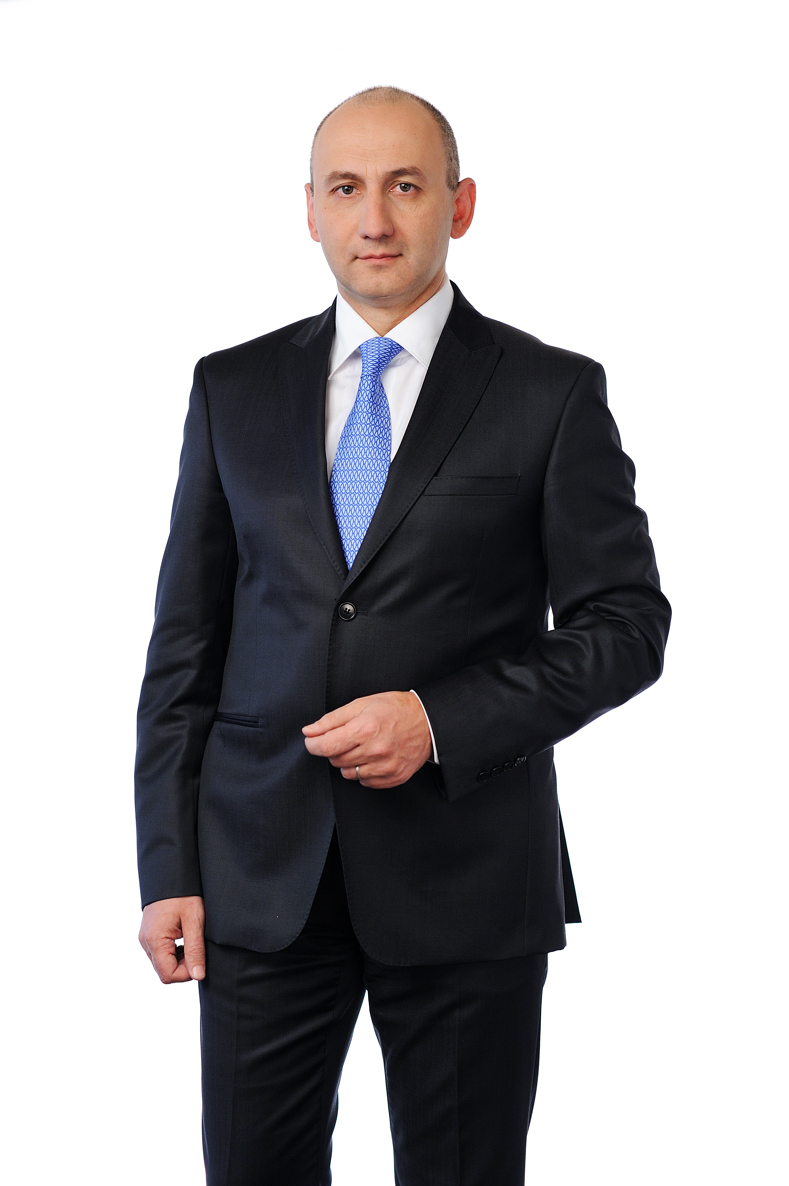
Momchil Andreev – Chairman of the Management Board and CEO of Raiffeisenbank Bulgaria

Momchil Andreev (Bulgarian: Момчил Андреев), b. 02.01.1964, is a Bulgarian member of the management bodies of Borica-Bank service, Uniqa insurance company and the Union of Hunters and Anglers in Bulgaria. He was Chairman of the Management Board, and Chief Executive Officer of Raiffeisenbank (Bulgaria) EAD, and Director of the Raiffeisen Group in Bulgaria.

== Career ==
He has graduated from the Moscow State Institute of International Relations with a master's degree in Business Administration. He has specialized in Finance and Banking in Austria, Germany, Luxembourg, Czech Republic, the USA, Switzerland, and France. He has been Chairman of the Management Board and Chief Executive Officer of Postbank and member of the Management Boards and Chief Executive Officer of Central Cooperative Bank, Unicredit Bulbank, and Raiffeisenbank.

== Awards ==
Andreev received the “Banker of the Year” 2010 Award) of The Banker, the Burov Award) for Financial Management and the “Worthy Bulgarians” Award of 24 Chasa daily and the Bulgarian National Television for Raiffeisenbank’s “Choose to help” donation initiative.

He has also won a number others awards:

- “Banker of the Year” presented by Banker weekly for dynamic banking management (2005)
- The Banking Management Award of Darik radio (2003)
- “Banker of the Year” presented by Banker weekly for successful contribution of a Bulgarian manager in the management of a foreign bank, which was most active in crediting companies in Bulgaria in 2000 (2000)
- Young and perspective bank manager presented by The Banker (1996)
