= Sheraton Grand Rio Hotel & Resort =

Highrise resort hotel in the Leblon neighbourhood in Rio de Janeiro, Brazil

Coordinates: 22.9923°S 43.233328°W

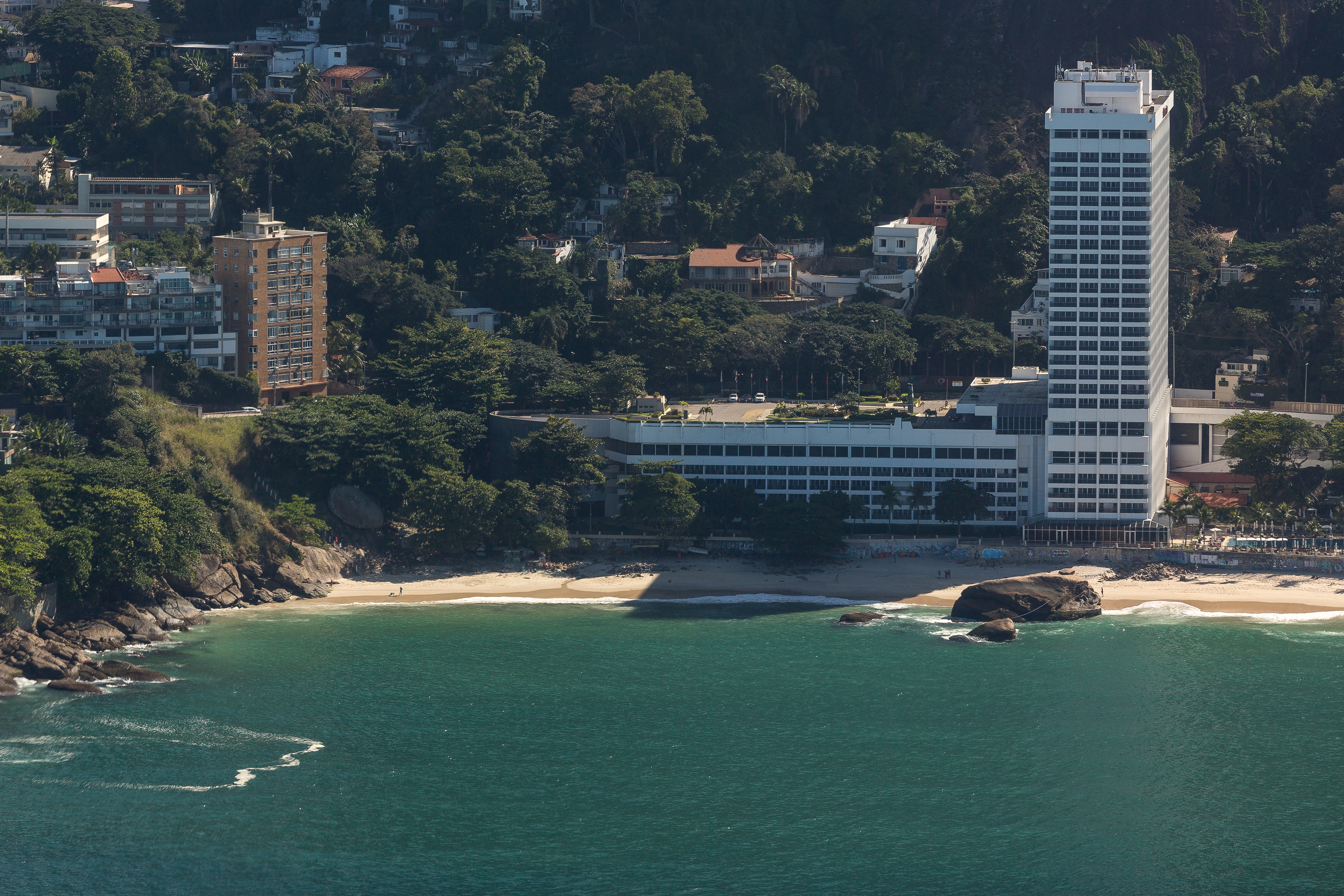
Sheraton Grand Rio Hotel & Resort

The Sheraton Grand Rio Hotel & Resort is a highrise resort hotel in the Leblon neighbourhood in Rio de Janeiro, Brazil. The hotel opened in 1974 as the Sheraton-Rio Hotel and has 549 guest rooms. It has a height of 77 metres (253 ft) and 26 floors. It is the only hotel fronting the small Praia do Vidigal.

American actress Lois Hamilton committed suicide in this hotel on December 23, 1999.
