= Grand Hotel Plovdiv =

- (Bulgarian: Гранд Хотел Пловдив)
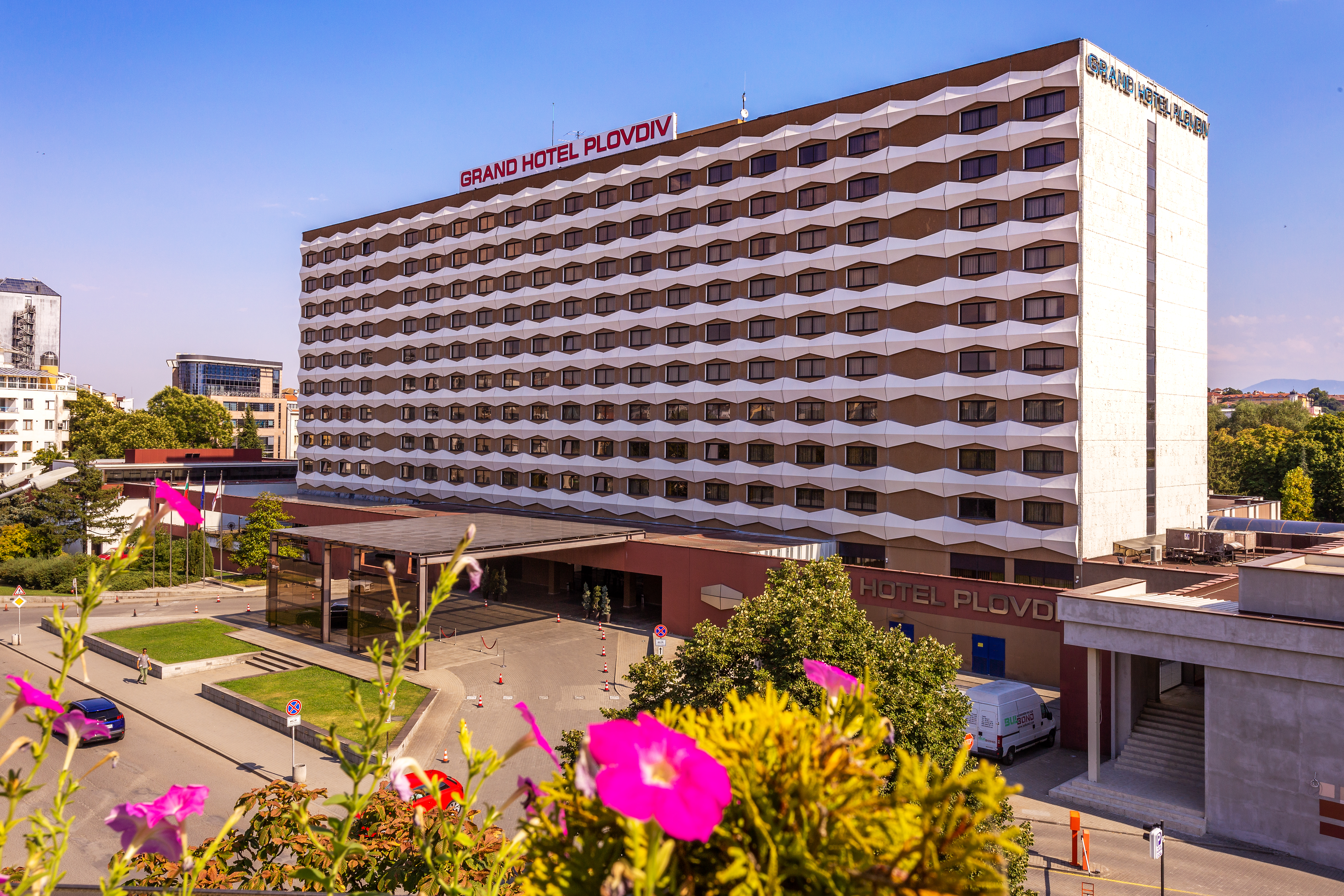
- Grand Hotel Plovdiv seen from the pedestrian bridge.
- Interactive map of the Grand Hotel Plovdiv area
- Alternative names: Grand Hotel Plovdiv

General information
- Type: Hotel
- Location: Plovdiv, Bulgaria
- Coordinates: 42°9′20″N 24°44′44″E

The Grand Hotel Plovdiv (Bulgarian: Гранд Хотел Пловдив), is a 4-star hotel in Plovdiv, Bulgaria.

== Description ==
The hotel opened in 1977 as Novotel Plovdiv, operated under the French Novotel brand before later passing into Bulgarian state ownership; it retained the Novotel name until 2016, when it left Accor and was renamed Grand Hotel Plovdiv.

It is located in the city's northern district, to the north of the Maritsa River, and in the vicinity of the International Fair Plovdiv.

The hotel has 300 rooms and 8 luxury flats. It also features 5 conference halls, a 150-seat restaurant, and a business center. The guests can relax and have a quick meeting at the hotel's Cafe 'Vienna'. Additionally, the hotel offers a fitness and spa center with an indoor swimming pool, sauna, steam bath, and Jacuzzi.

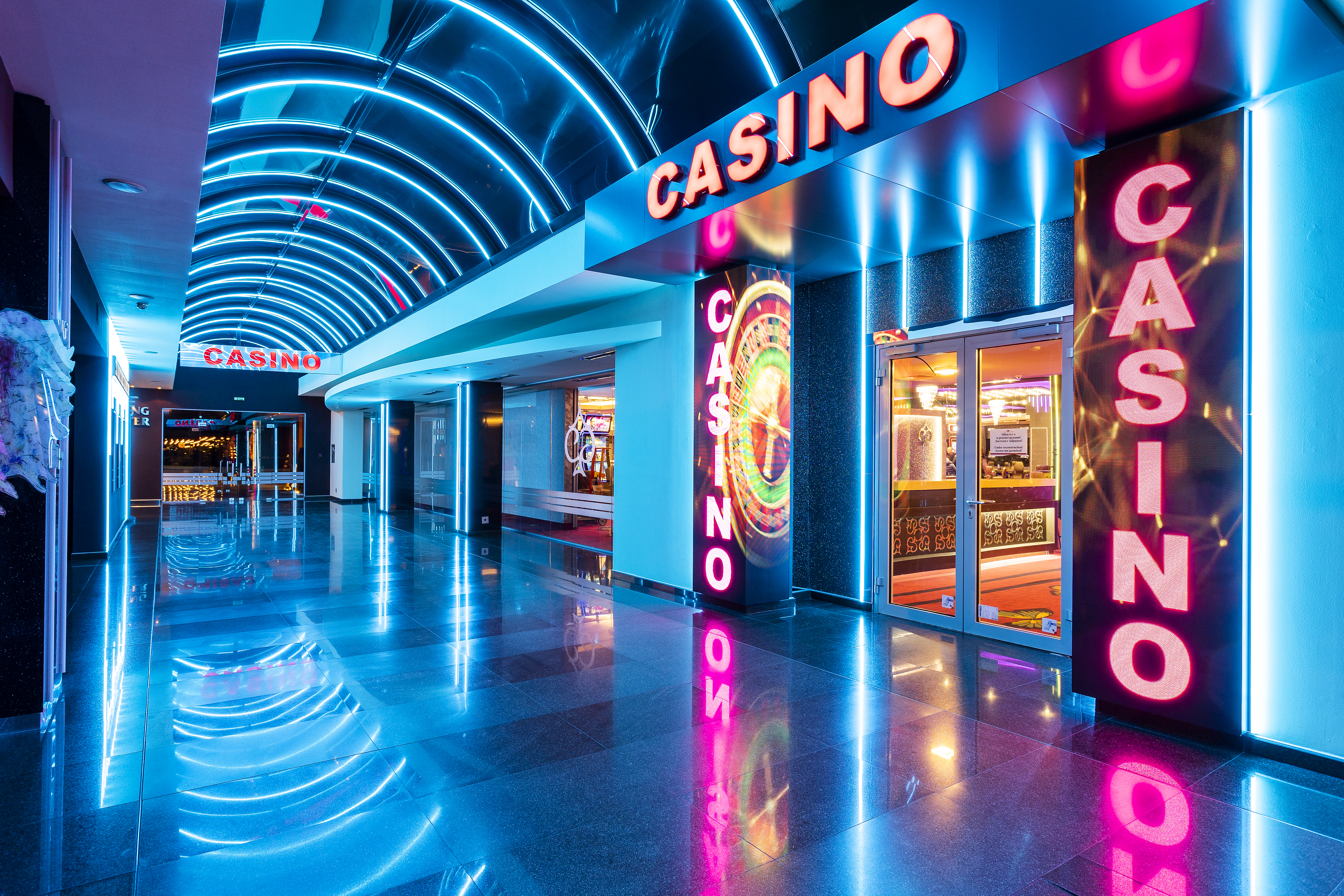
Entrance to the casino

For guest entertainment, Grand Hotel Plovdiv recently opened Platinum Casino Plovdiv. The casino offers a selection of live games and slot machines, which include Blackjack, Caribbean Stud Poker, Ultimate Texas Hold’em, and Roulette, as well as organized poker tournaments.

The city's main street ends with the pedestrian bridge which spans the Maritsa river to the west of the hotel.

== Notable events ==
In 2009, the hotel hosted the International Olympiad in Informatics, an annual competitive-programming competition.
In 2022, Grand Hotel Plovdiv opened its Platinum Casino Plovdiv.
