= Timeline of Rio de Janeiro =

Coordinates: 22.908333°S 43.196389°W

The following is a timeline of the history of the city of Rio de Janeiro, Brazil.

== Prior to 19th century ==
- 1565 AD
  - São Sebastião do Rio de Janeiro founded by Portuguese.
  - Fortaleza de São João built.
- 1603 - St James of Mercy Fort built.
- 1663 - Padre Eterno galleon launched.
- 1693 - Calaboose Prison built.
- 1736 - Academia dos Felizes founded.
- 1743 - Paço Imperial built.
- 1750 - Carioca Aqueduct built.
- 1752 - Academia dos Seletos founded.
- 1763 - Portuguese America administrative center moved to Rio de Janeiro from Salvador.
- 1770 - Old Cathedral of Rio de Janeiro consecrated.
- 1783 - Passeio Público constructed.
- 1792 - Real Academia de Artilharia, Fortificação e Desenho founded.

== 19th century ==
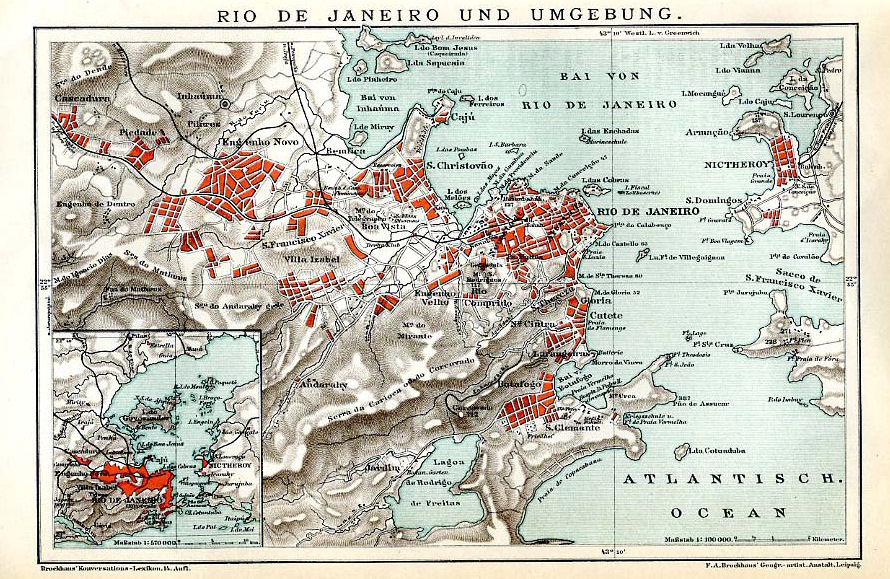
Map of Rio de Janeiro, 1895

- 1803 - Paço de São Cristóvão building erected.
- 1808
  - City becomes capital of Kingdom of Portugal.
  - Impressão Régia (royal printing press) begins operating.
  - 10 September: Gazeta do Rio de Janeiro newspaper begins publication.
- 1811 - Candelária Church inaugurated.
- 1811 - Construction of Valongo Wharf started.
- 1815 - City becomes capital of United Kingdom of Portugal, Brazil and the Algarves
- 1818 - Royal Museum established.
- 1822
  - City becomes capital of independent Brazil.
  - Rio de Janeiro Botanical Garden opens.
- 1826 - Academia Imperial de Belas Artes founded.
- 1827
  - Jornal do Commercio newspaper in publication.
  - Sociedade Auxiliadora da Indústria Nacional founded in Rio.
- 1838 - Instituto Histórico e Geográfico Brasileiro headquartered in Rio.
- 1852 - Theatro Provisório built.
- 1854 - Catete Palace built.
- 1858
  - Dom Pedro II railway begins operating.
  - Central do Brasil inaugurated.
- 1871 - Theatro D. Pedro II (theatre) inaugurated.
- 1872 - Population: 274,972.
- 1877 - Santa Teresa Tram opens.
- 1884 - Corcovado Rack Railway opens.
- 1891 - Jornal do Brasil newspaper begins publication.
- 1894 - Confeitaria Colombo (coffee house) opens.
- 1896 - Academia Brasileira de Letras founded.

== 20th century ==
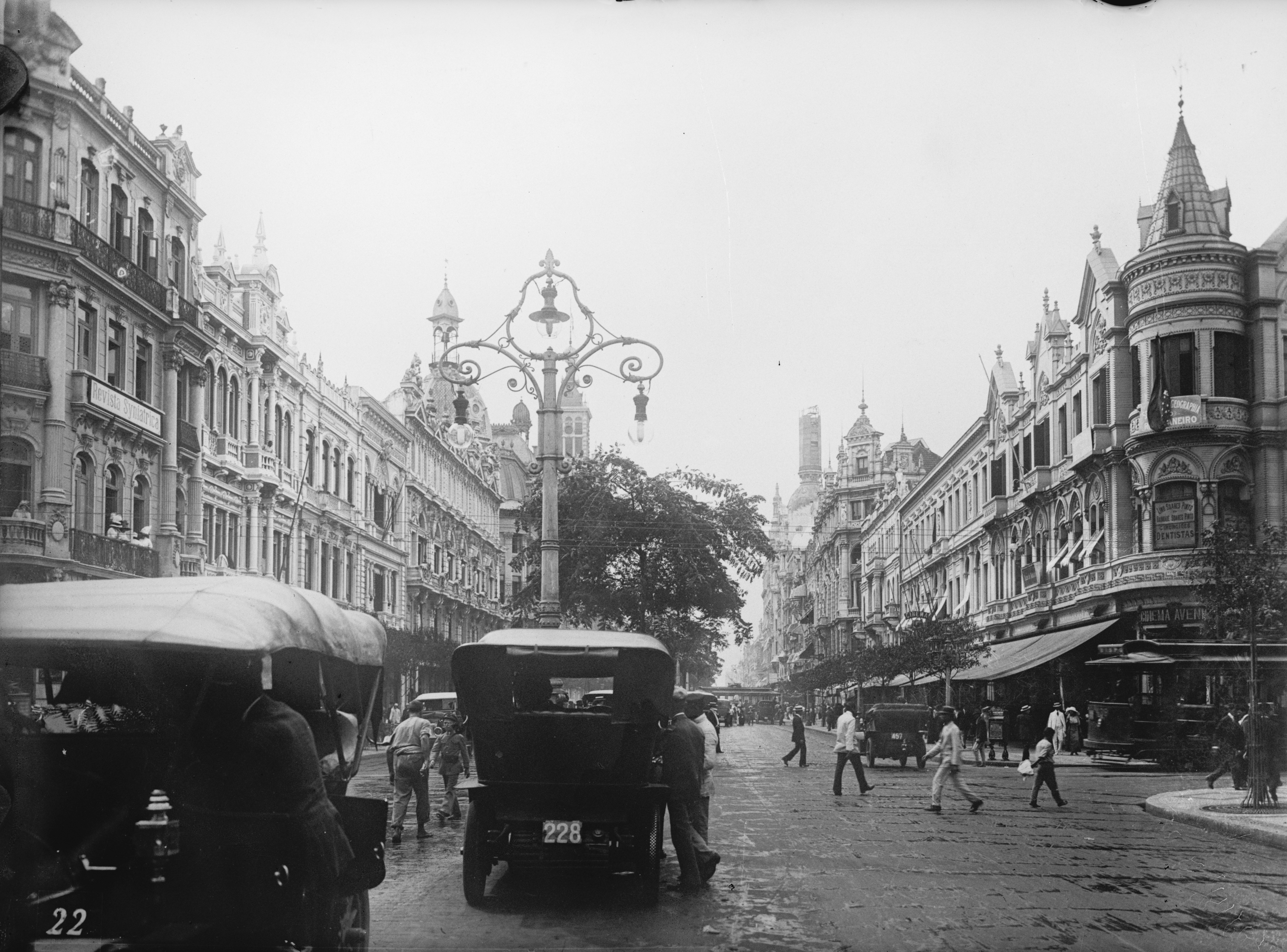
Rio de Janeiro, ca.1910s

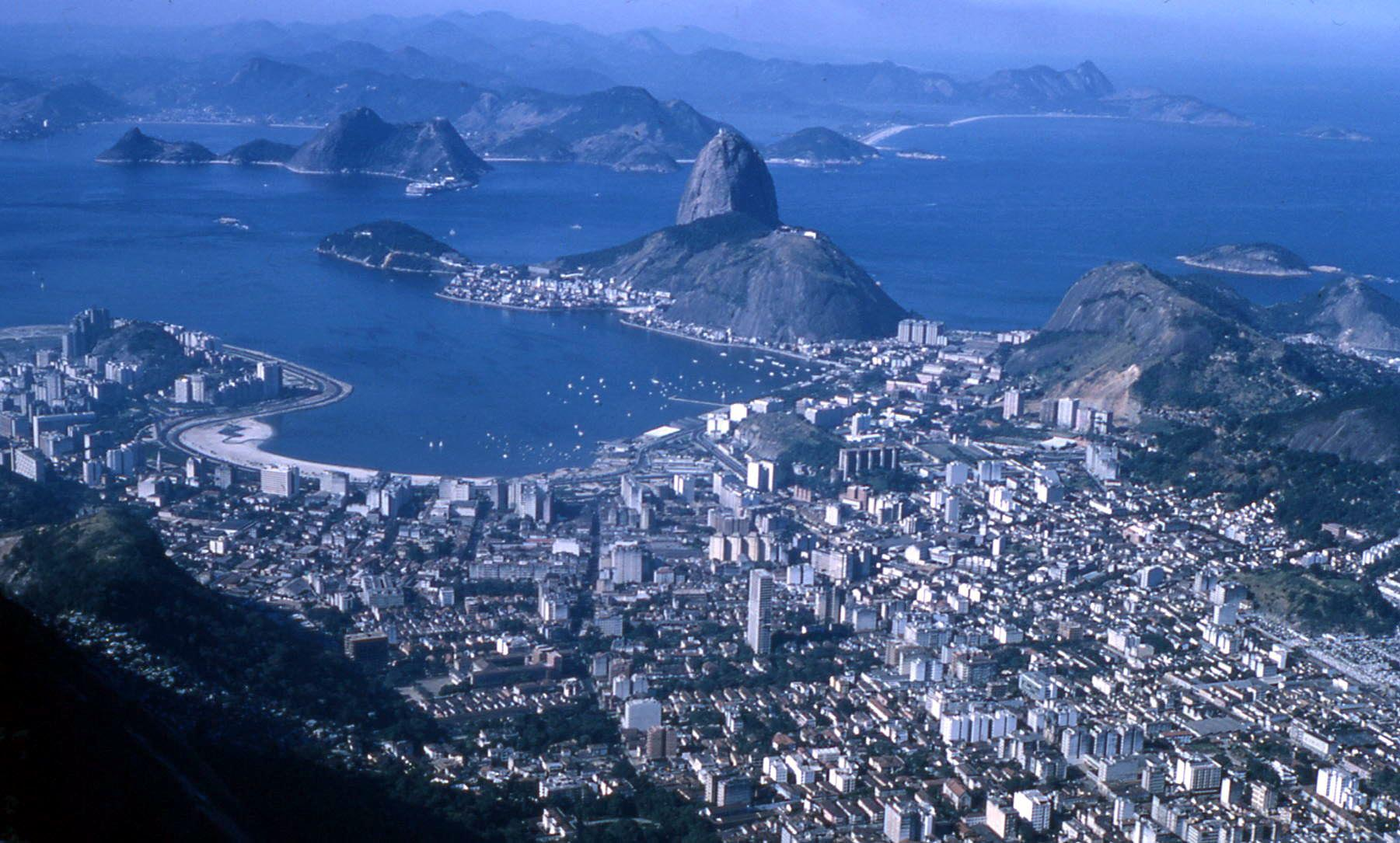
Rio de Janeiro, 1967

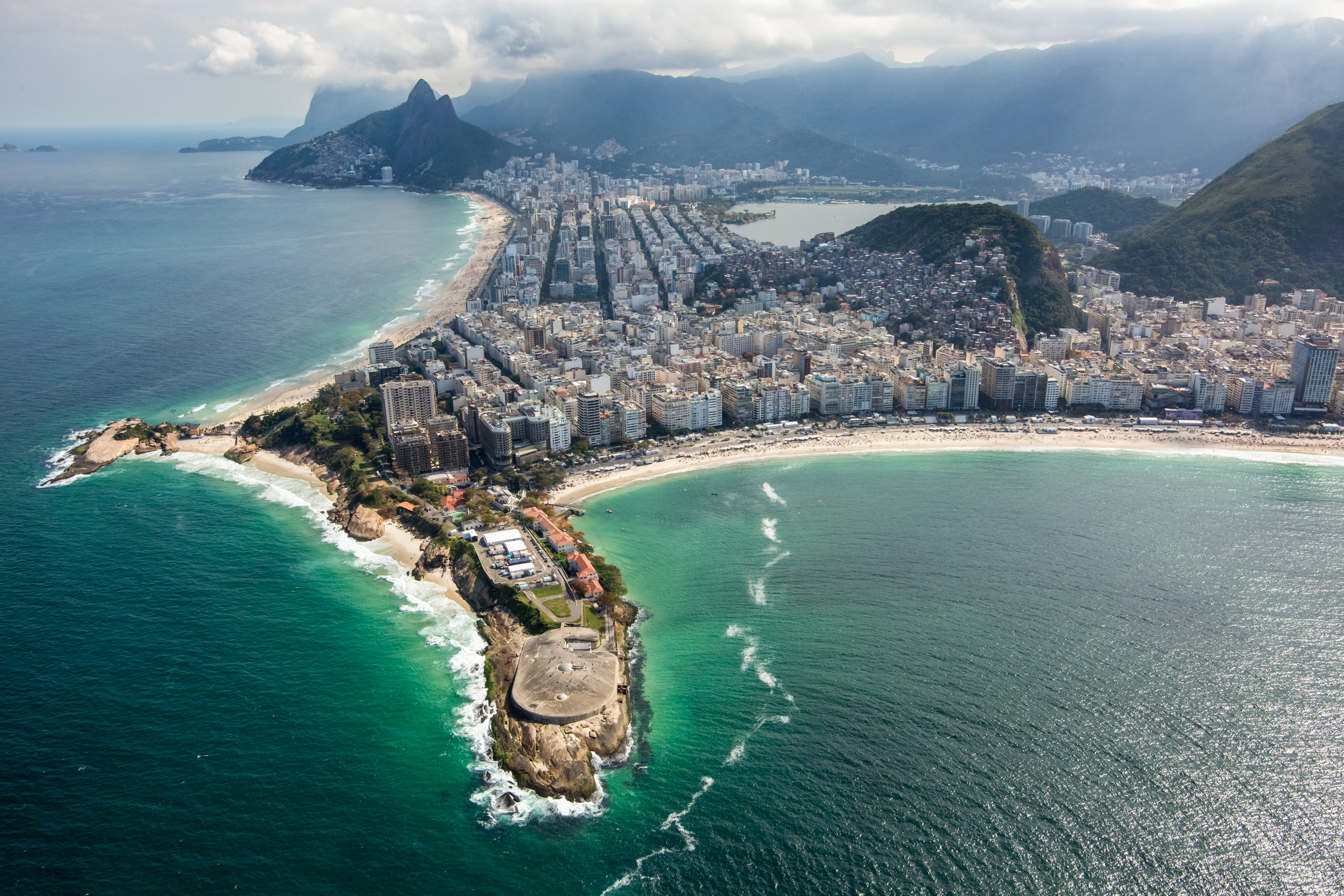
Fort Copacabana, 2016

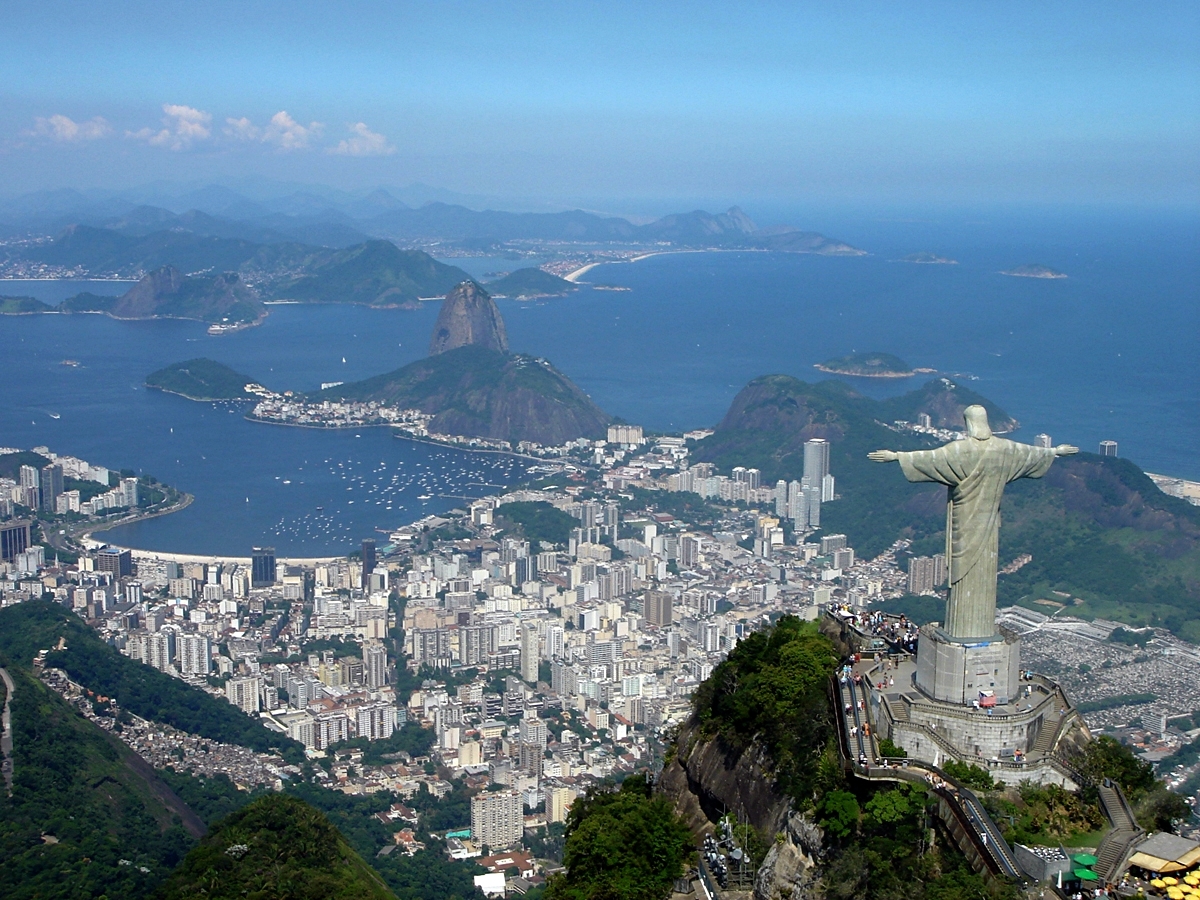
Christ the Redeemer, 2006

=== 1900s-1940s ===
- 1902 - Universidade Candido Mendes founded.
- 1904
  - Vaccine Revolt.
  - Avenida Rio Branco constructed.
- 1906 - Palácio Monroe erected.
- 1908
  - City flag design adopted.
  - Exhibition of the centenary of the opening of the Ports of Brazil held in Urca.
  - 7 April: Associação Brasileira de Imprensa headquartered in city.
- 1909 - Teatro Municipal (theatre) inaugurated.
- 1912
  - Afonsos Air Force Base built.
  - Civil Police Museum founded.
- 1914 - Fort Copacabana built.
- 1917 - Labor strike.
- 1919 - South American Championship held.
- 1920 - Federal University of Rio de Janeiro founded.
- 1922
  - July: Coup attempt.
  - National Historical Museum (Brazil) created.
  - Population: 1,130,000.
  - August: Hotel Glória built.
  - Morro do Castelo (Castle Hill) demolished—now Castelo neighborhood.
  - Independence Centenary International Exposition held.
- 1923 - Copacabana Palace Hotel inaugurated.
- 1925 - O Globo newspaper begins publication.
- 1926 - Hipódromo da Gávea built.
- 1927 - Edificio do Jornal A Noite built.
- 1931
  - Pedro Ernesto Baptista becomes mayor.
  - Cristo Redentor statue built.
- 1936
  - Bartolomeu de Gusmão Airport inaugurated.
  - Manguinhos Airport opens.
  - Santos Dumont Airport inaugurated.
- 1937 - Universidade Santa Úrsula founded.
- 1938 - Museu Nacional de Belas Artes inaugurated.
- 1940 - Pontifical Catholic University of Rio de Janeiro founded.
- 1943
  - Gustavo Capanema Palace built.
  - Santa Cruz Air Force Base established.
- 1945 - Quinta da Boa Vista inaugurated.
- 1947 - South American Basketball Championship held.
- 1949 - Tribuna da Imprensa newspaper begins publication.

=== 1950s-1990s ===
- 1950
  - Rio de Janeiro State University established.
  - Maracanã (stadium) opens.
  - Population: 2,303,063.
- 1951 - Nova Iguaçu level crossing disaster.
- 1952
  - Instituto Nacional de Matemática Pura e Aplicada established.
  - Escola Brasileira de Administração Pública e de Empresas founded.
  - Manchete (magazine) headquartered in city.
- 1953 - Museu do Índio created.
- 1954 - Ginásio do Maracanãzinho built.
- 1958 - Train crash.
- 1960
  - Brazil's capital is moved from Rio to Brasília.
  - Rio ceases to be the Federal District and instead becomes the state of Guanabara, then the smallest state of Brazil.
- 1961
  - Tijuca Forest becomes a national park.
  - Edificio Avenida Central built.
- 1964 - Museum of Modern Art built.
- 1965
  - Rede Globo begins broadcasting.
  - Flamengo Park created.
  - Banda de Ipanema begins.
- 1968 - March of the One Hundred Thousand against the military dictatorship happened.
- 1970 - Population: 4,252,009.
- 1971
  - Jacarepaguá Airport opens.
  - Faculdades Integradas Hélio Alonso founded.
- 1972
  - Petrobras Headquarters built.
  - Hotel Horsa Nacional built.
- 1975
  - The state of Guanabara is merged with the state of Rio de Janeiro and the city becomes the capital of the enlarged state, replacing Niterói in the latter role.
  - Marcos Tamoio becomes mayor.
  - Escola de Artes Visuais do Parque Lage created.
- 1976 - Le Méridien Copacabana opens.
- 1977
  - Riocentro built.
  - Rio Othon Palace hotel opens.
- 1978 - Autódromo Internacional Nelson Piquet built.
- 1979
  - Rio de Janeiro Metro founded.
  - Israel Klabin becomes mayor.
  - Universidade Federal do Estado do Rio de Janeiro established.
  - Rio de Janeiro Cathedral built.
- 1980
  - Júlio Coutinho becomes mayor.
  - 105 Lélio Gama St. built.
- 1981 - Barra Shopping opens.
- 1982 - Rio Sul Center built.
- 1983
  - Rede Manchete television begins broadcasting.
  - Jamil Haddad becomes mayor, succeeded by Marcello Alencar.
- 1984
  - Sambadrome Marquês de Sapucaí built.
  - CasaShopping opens.
- 1985 - City joins the newly formed União das Cidades Capitais Luso-Afro-Américo-Asiáticas.
- 1986 - Roberto Saturnino Braga becomes mayor.
- 1988 - Jó Antônio Resende becomes mayor.
- 1989
  - 16 July: 1989 Copa América football tournament held.
  - Marcello Alencar becomes mayor.
  - Centro Cultural Banco do Brasil (Rio branch) opens.
- 1990
  - Eva Klabin Foundation museum established.
  - Escadaria Selarón construction begins.
- 1991 - Population: 5,473,909.
- 1992 - United Nations Conference on Environment and Development (Earth Summit) held.
- 1993
  - César Maia becomes mayor.
  - Candelária massacre.
  - Population: 5,547,033 (estimate).
- 1994 - Metropolitan hall opens.
- 1995 - Centro Empresarial Internacional Rio built.
- 1997
  - Luiz Paulo Conde becomes mayor.
  - Miécimo da Silva Sports Complex opens.
- 1998
  - Terra Encantada opens.
  - Project Morrinho begins.
  - Palace II building collapses.
- 2000 - 2000 Ibero-American Championships in Athletics held.

== 21st century ==
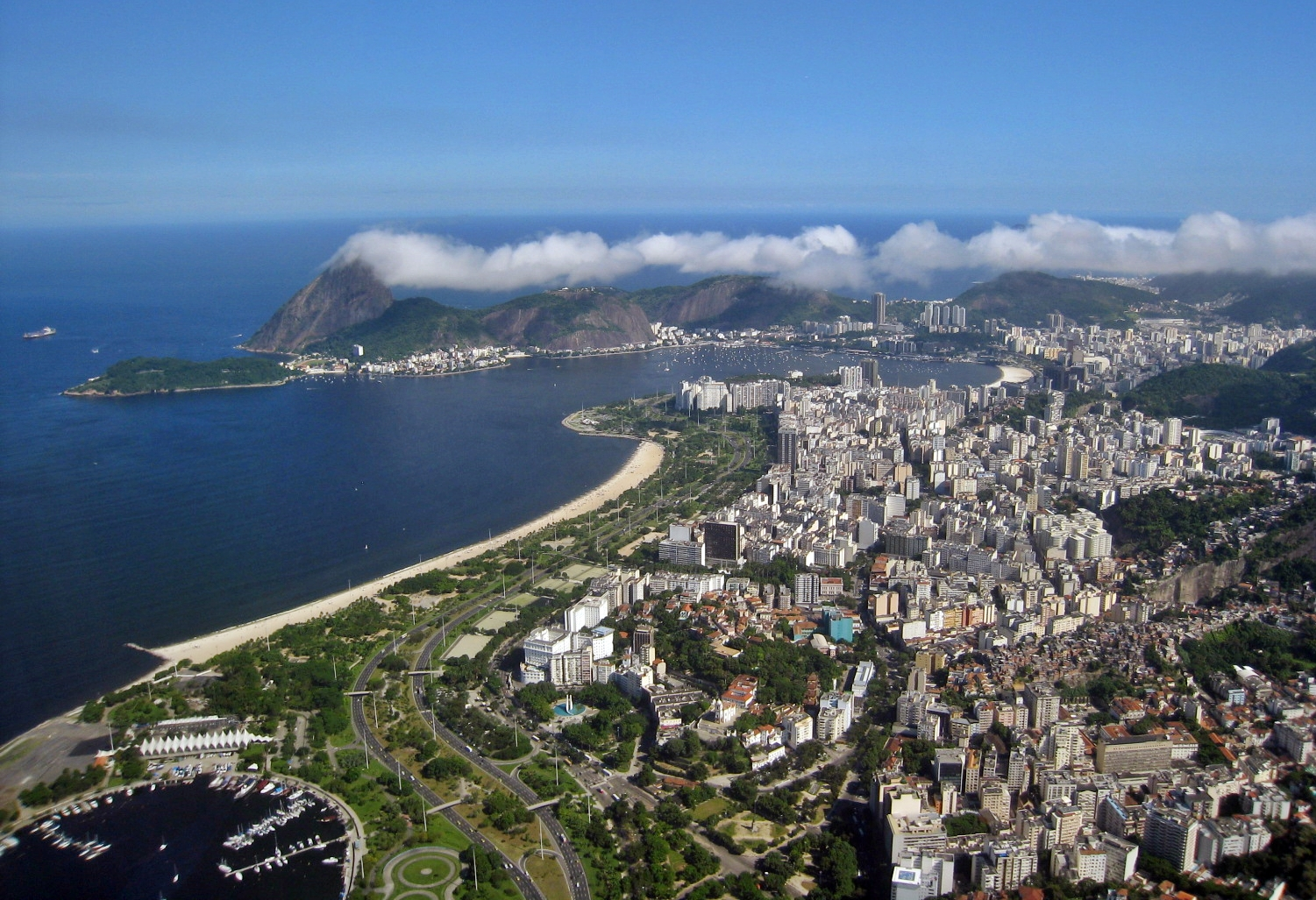
Rio de Janeiro, 2008

- 2001 - César Maia becomes mayor.
- 2002 - Instituto Superior de Tecnologia em Ciências da Computação do Rio de Janeiro established.
- 2004 - Torre Almirante built
- 2007
  - Cantagalo Station opens.
  - Estádio Olímpico Nilton Santos built.
  - HSBC Arena (Rio de Janeiro) opens.
  - 2007 Pan American Games held.
  - Rio de Janeiro train collision.
- 2008 - Rio International Open Jiu-Jitsu Championship begins.
- 2009
  - Eduardo Paes becomes mayor.
  - City wins the 2016 Olympics and Paralympics bid.
- 2010
  - World Urban Forum and Homeless World Cup football contest held.
  - Manguinhos Library Park opens in Benfica.
  - Population: 6,320,446.
- 2011
  - Cidade das Artes built.
  - April: School shooting killed 12 students.
- 2012
  - 25 January: Building collapses.
  - 6 June: Transoeste bus inaugurated.
  - 20–22 June: United Nations Conference on Sustainable Development held.
  - 7 October: Rio de Janeiro 2012 municipal election held.
- 2013 - Protest.
- 2014 - 2014 FIFA World Cup and Street Child World Cup football contest held.
- 2015
  - July: Uber protest.
  - December: Museum of Tomorrow opens.
- 2016
  - Olympic Games and Paralympic Games held.
  - 2 October: Rio de Janeiro 2016 municipal election held.
  - 6 October: Rio de Janeiro International Film Festival
  - 14 October: Ultra Brasil (electronic music festival)
  - 25 October: Anima Mundi (animation film festival)
- 2017 - Valongo Wharf designated an UNESCO World Heritage Site.
- 2018
  - January 19: A car hits a group of pedestrians near the Copacabana Beach, killing an infant.
  - 2 September: National Museum of Brazil fire.
- 2019
  - February 6: Heavy rain hits the state of Rio de Janeiro, leaving 6 people dead and 2 missing.
  - February 8: Flamengo training ground fire leaves 10 people dead.
  - April 8: Unusual rain causes landslides, flooding and at least 10 deaths.

== See also ==
- History of Rio de Janeiro
- List of mayors of Rio de Janeiro

Other cities in Brazil:

- Timeline of Brasília
- Timeline of Curitiba
- Timeline of Fortaleza
- Timeline of Manaus
- Timeline of Recife
- Timeline of Salvador, Bahia
- Timeline of São Paulo

== Bibliography ==
Published in the 19th century

- John Mawe (1812), "Description of Rio de Janeiro", Travels in the Interior of Brazil, London: Longman, Hurst, Rees, Orme, and Brown
- John Luccock (1820), Notes on Rio de Janeiro, and the southern parts of Brazil, London: S. Leigh, OL 6917919M
- Josiah Conder (1830), "City of Rio de Janeiro", The Modern Traveller, London: J.Duncan
- J.C.R. Milliet de Saint-Adolphe (1863), "Rio-de-Janeiro", Diccionario geographico, historico e descriptivo, do imperio do Brazil (in Portuguese), Paris: J. P. Aillaud, hdl:2027/wu.89006303077 – via HathiTrust
- Michael George Mulhall; E.T. Mulhall (1877). "Rio Janeyro". Handbook of Brazil. Buenos Ayres. hdl:2027/mdp.39015014192523.
- James W. Wells (1886), "Rio de Janeiro", Exploring and travelling three thousand miles through Brazil from Rio de Janeiro to Maranhão, London: Low
- Editors of the Rio News (1887). Handbook of Rio de Janeiro. Rio de Janeiro: A.J. Lamoureux.

Published in the 20th century

- "Rio de Janeiro", Chambers's Encyclopaedia, London: W. & R. Chambers, 1901
- "Rio de Janeiro". Collier's Encyclopedia. New York: P.F. Collier & Son. 1928. hdl:2027/mdp.39015073301890.
- "Rio Panorama", National Geographic Magazine, vol. 76, Washington DC, 1939
- "Local History, Brazil: Rio de Janeiro". Catalog of the William B. Greenlee Collection of Portuguese History ... in the Newberry Library. Chicago: Newberry Library. 1953. hdl:2027/mdp.39015023946240 – via HathiTrust.
- W.A. Robson, ed. (1954). "Rio de Janeiro". Great Cities of the World: their Government, Politics and Planning. Routledge. p. 489+. ISBN 978-1-135-67247-8.
- Rio de Janeiro, Great Cities, Time-Life Books, 1977, OL 4292341M – via Open Library
- Mary C. Karasch, Slave Life in Rio de Janeiro, 1808-1850 (Princeton University Press, 1987)
- Jeffrey D. Needell, A Tropical Belle Epoque: Elite Culture and Society in Turn-of-the-Century Rio de Janeiro (Cambridge University Press, 1987)
- "Rio de Janeiro City", Brazil (4th ed.), Lonely Planet, 1998, p. 146+, ISBN 978-0-86442-561-4 – via Open Library

Published in the 21st century

- "Rio de Janeiro". Understanding Slums: Case Studies for the Global Report 2003. United Nations Human Settlements Programme and University College London. 2003.
- Thomas H. Holloway (2008). "Doing Favors for Street People: Official Responses to Beggars and Vagrants in Nineteenth-Century Rio de Janeiro". In Beier and Ocobock (ed.). Cast Out: Vagrancy and Homelessness in Global and Historical Perspective. Ohio University Press. p. 162+. ISBN 978-0-89680-262-9.
- Teresa A. Meade (2010). Civilizing Rio: Reform and Resistance in a Brazilian City, 1889-1930. Pennsylvania State University Press. ISBN 978-0-271-04211-4.
