= Rio de Janeiro train crash =

Rio de Janeiro train crash or Rio de Janeiro train collision may refer to the following rail incidents in Rio de Janeiro, Brazil:

- The 2007 Rio de Janeiro train collision, an incident in Nova Iguaçu in which 11 people were killed
- The Nova Iguaçu level crossing disaster, a 1951 collision in which 54 people died
- The Anchieta rail disaster, a crash in 1952 in which 119 people died
- The 1958 Rio de Janeiro train crash, an incident in which 128 people were killed
