= April 1946 =

Month of 1946

| << | April 1946 | | | | | >> |
| Su | Mo | Tu | We | Th | Fr | Sa |
| | 1 | 2 | 3 | 4 | 5 | 6 |
| 7 | 8 | 9 | 10 | 11 | 12 | 13 |
| 14 | 15 | 16 | 17 | 18 | 19 | 20 |
| 21 | 22 | 23 | 24 | 25 | 26 | 27 |
| 28 | 29 | 30 |

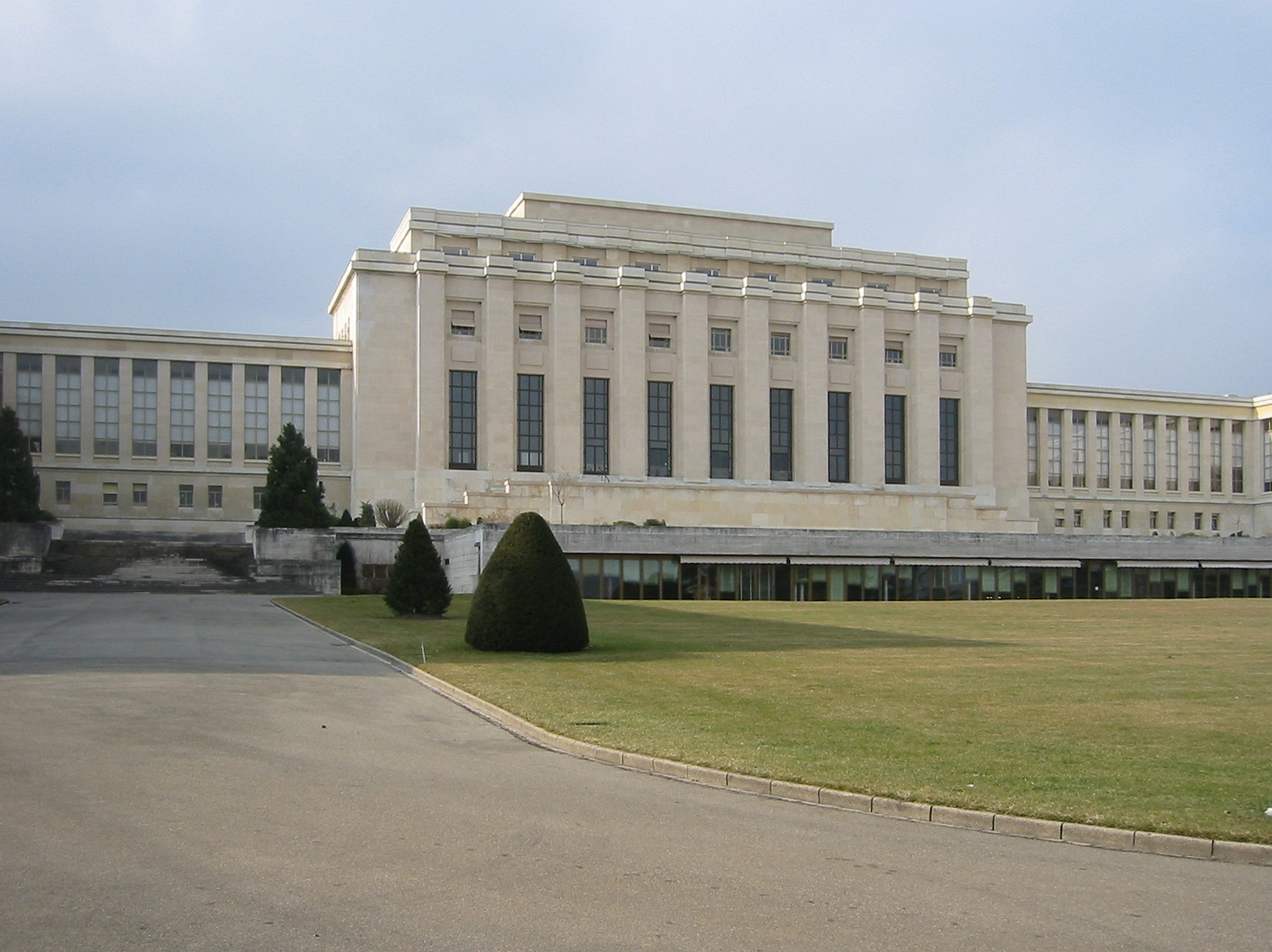
April 18, 1946: The League of Nations closes after 27 years

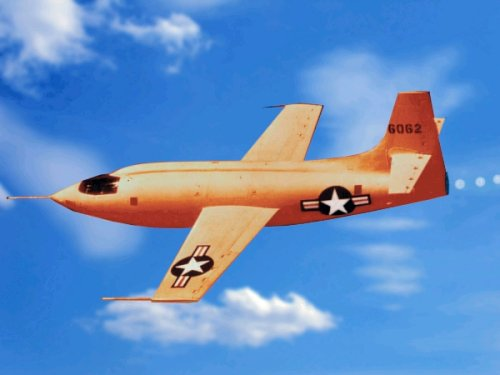
April 11, 1946: The rocket plane X-1-1 makes its first flight

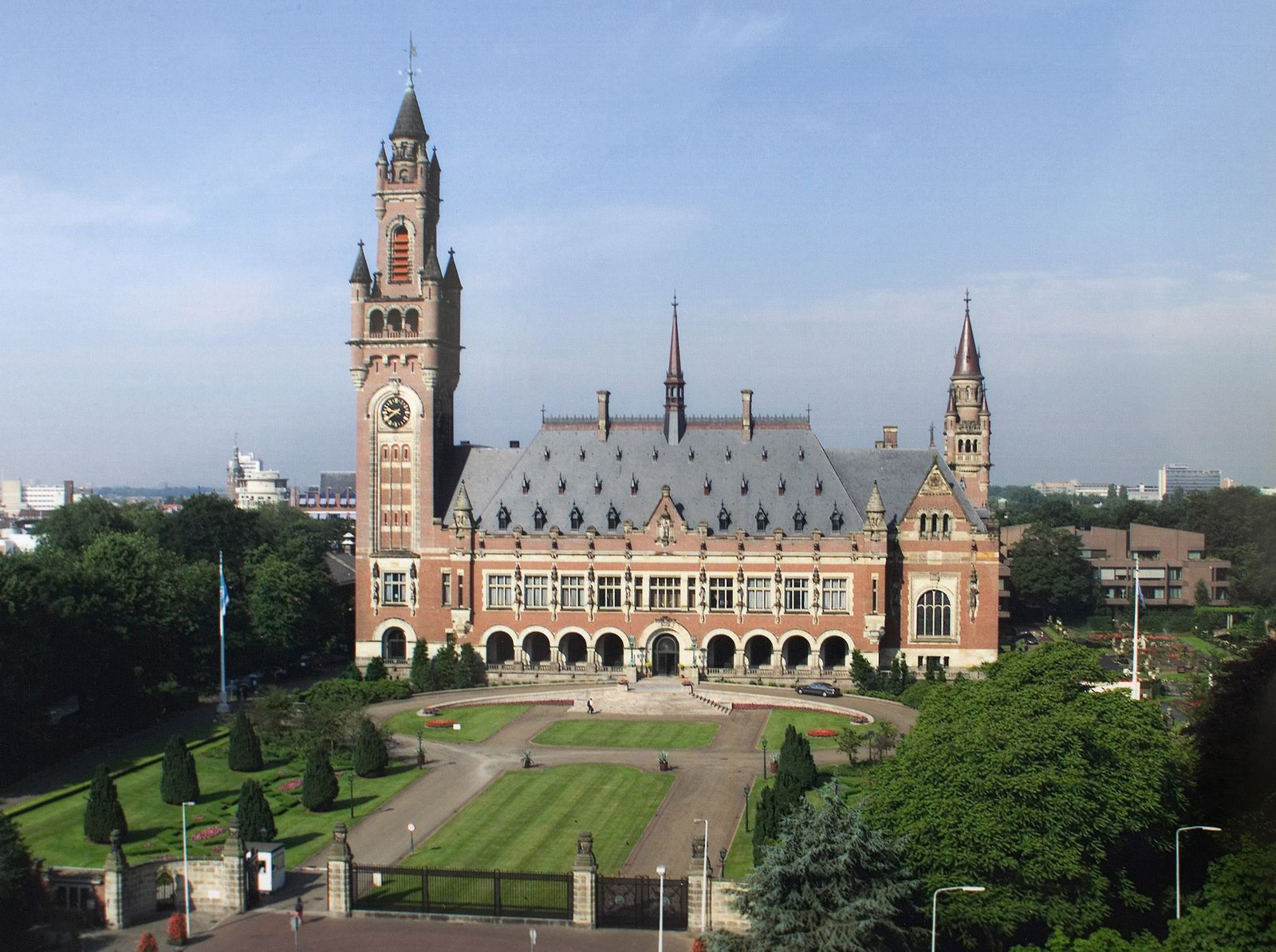
April 18, 1946: The United Nations World Court opens at the Peace Palace in The Hague

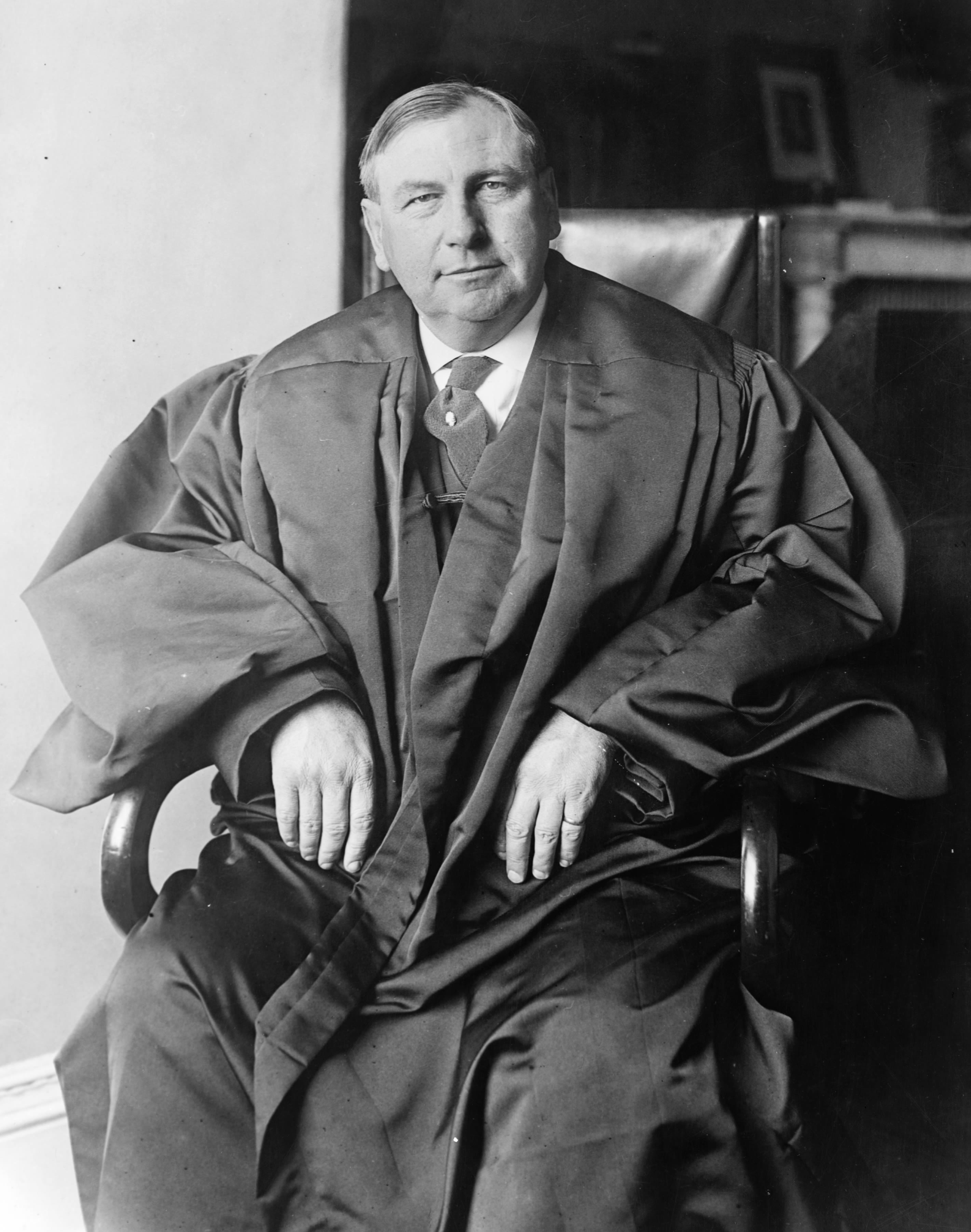
April 22, 1946: U.S. Chief Justice Stone suffers fatal stroke during proceedings

The following events occurred in April 1946:

== April 1, 1946 (Monday) ==
- A tsunami, generated by an 8.6 magnitude earthquake near Alaska, killed 159 people in Hawaii. Waves 25 feet (7.6 m) high struck Hilo shortly after 7:00 am local time, and almost five hours after the Alaskan tremor.
- Bituminous coal miners walked off the job across the United States, as 400,000 UMWA members went on strike in 26 states. The miners returned to work after six weeks.
- As part of Operation Road's End, the United States Navy destroyed and sank 24 Japanese submarines that had been surrendered at the end of World War II. Twenty-three were blown up with demolition charges. The I-58, which had sunk the USS Indianapolis (CA-35), was destroyed by shellfire.
- Dissolution of the Straits Settlements: The United Kingdom made Singapore a Crown colony, separating the predominantly Chinese population from the rest of the Union of Malaya.
- The United States Supreme Court declined to grant certiorari on an appeal from the 5th Circuit Court of Appeals in Chapman v. King, et al. 154 F.2d 460 (5th Cir. 1946), which held that African-Americans could not be barred from voting in primary elections in Georgia. At the time, the Democratic Party was the dominant political party in Georgia and other Southern states in the Fifth Circuit, and the winner of the Democratic primary was frequently unopposed in the general election. Primus E. King of Columbus, Georgia, had commenced the suit in 1944, to challenge the practice of allowing political parties to set their own rules concerning who would be allowed to vote in a nominating election. The decision paved the way for allowing Black Americans to vote in primary elections in other states.
- Born: Robert Garwood, U.S. Marine and Vietnam POW, who was convicted in 1981 of collaboration with the enemy; in Greensburg, Indiana
- Died:
  - Noah Beery, Sr., 64, American film actor
  - Edward Sheldon, 60, American playwright

== April 2, 1946 (Tuesday) ==
- In Japan, General Douglas MacArthur, administrator of the American occupation, issued the first regulations against fraternization between American soldiers and Japanese citizens. Originally intended to stop soldiers from consorting with prostitutes, the regulations soon provided for segregation in public transportation, food service and accommodation, with Japanese residents being barred from American facilities, and vice versa.
- Japanese storekeeper Katsumi Yanagisawa began the business of manufacturing music stands, which grew into the Pearl Musical Instrument Company, and eventually became Pearl Drums.
- Born: Yves "Apache" Trudeau, Canadian murderer alleged to have killed 43 people for the Hells Angels group. (d. 2008)
- Died: Kate Bruce, 88, American silent screen actress

== April 3, 1946 (Wednesday) ==
- An article on the front page of the Amsterdam newspaper Het Parool brought the attention of publishers to the existence of a diary, written by a teenage girl who had died in a Nazi concentration camp. Historian Jan Romein wrote, under the headline "Kinderstem" ("A Child's Voice"), "[T]his apparently inconsequential diary by a child ... stammered out in a child's voice, embodies all the hideousness of fascism, more so than all the evidence at Nueremberg put together." Published in the Netherlands as 1947 as Het Archterhuis: Dagboekbrieven ("The Attic: Diary Notes"), the book would be translated into English in 1952 as Anne Frank: The Diary of a Young Girl.

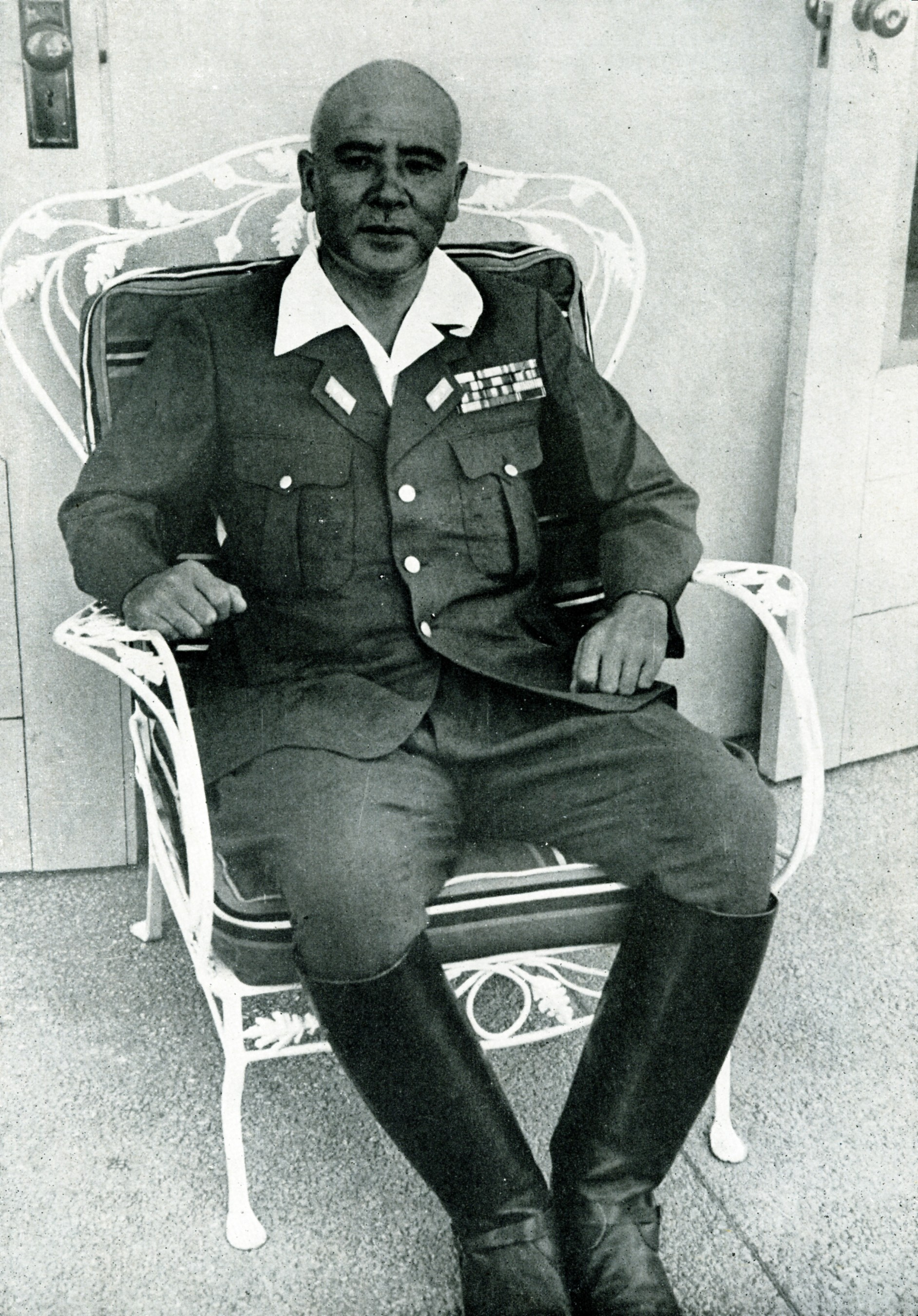
General Homma

- Died: Lt. Gen. Masaharu Homma, Japanese general who ordered the Bataan death march, was executed in Manila by a U.S. Army firing squad.

== April 4, 1946 (Thursday) ==
- The eleven nation Far Eastern Commission exempted Japan's Emperor Hirohito from being tried for war crimes.
- Nine U.S. Navy personnel, from the aircraft carrier USS Tarawa, were killed while watching training exercises from an observation tower in Puerto Rico. One of the airplanes inadvertently released a bomb which made a direct hit on the tower.
- Born: Dave Hill, English guitarist (Slade), in Holbeton

== April 5, 1946 (Friday) ==
- The Soviet Union and Iran announced a 25-year agreement to create a "Soviet-Persian Oil Company", with the U.S.S.R. to have 51% of Iran's oil rights in return for the withdrawal of Soviet troops. However, the treaty, subject to the approval of Iran's Majlis, was rejected in 1947.
- The Soviet Union ended its occupation of the island of Bornholm, a territory of Denmark located in the Baltic Sea.
- A British Vickers Wellington airplane, part of the Fleet Air Arm of the Royal Navy and designated as HE274, crashed into a residential area in Rabat, Malta during a training exercise, killing 16 civilians on the ground and all four crew members.
- By a 41–27 margin, the United States Senate approved increasing the 40¢/hour minimum wage to 65¢ per hour.
- Thirty-six years after it had been written, Charles Ives's Third Symphony was given its first public performance. In 1947, Ives would win a Pulitzer Prize for the 1910 symphony.
- Born: Björn Granath, Swedish actor; in Gothenburg (d. 2017)
- Died: Vincent Youmans, 45, American songwriter

== April 6, 1946 (Saturday) ==
- Captain Hoshijima Susumu, Japanese commander of the Sandakan prisoner-of-war camp in Indonesia, was hanged for war crimes. Capt. Hoshijima had ordered the "Sandakan Death Marches" as the war approached a close in 1945. During his administration, nearly 6,000 prisoners died—4,000 Indonesians, 1,381 Australians and 641 British.
- Acting on a tip from a geisha house, American officials unearthed two billion dollars' worth of gold, silver and platinum that had been hidden in the muddy bottom of Tokyo Bay. An officer of the Japanese Army had carried out the concealment of the precious metals in July 1945, shortly before the surrender of Japan.

== April 7, 1946 (Sunday) ==
- Free elections were conducted in Milan for the first time since 1922, when Benito Mussolini had installed a Fascist regime, and 800,000 ballots were cast in voting for local councilmen.
- Born:
  - Colette Besson, French athlete, 1968 Olympic gold medalist in the 400 m race; in Saint-Georges-de-Didonne (d. 2005)
  - Zaid Abdul-Aziz, American NBA player, as Donald A. Smith in Brooklyn
  - Léon Krier, Luxembourgian architect (d. 2025)

== April 8, 1946 (Monday) ==
- In Geneva, the League of Nations, predecessor to the United Nations, opened its final session.
- The Fort Wayne Zollner Pistons, who would later become the NBA's Detroit Pistons, won their third consecutive World Professional Basketball Tournament, defeating the Oshkosh All-Stars 73-57 to win the third and final game of the best-of-three series.
- Two iconic films of 1946, Frank Capra's It's a Wonderful Life and William Wyler's The Best Years of Our Lives, began filming on the same day.
- Électricité de France (EDF) was created, as the French government nationalized the electric industry in that nation, formerly handled by more than 1,450 firms.
- Ethiopian Airlines, now one of the largest airlines in Africa, began its first service, with a flight between Addis Ababa and Cairo.
- Born:
  - Robert L. Johnson, the first African-American billionaire and founder of Black Entertainment Television (BET); in Hickory, Mississippi
  - Jim "Catfish" Hunter, American MLB pitcher; in Hertford, North Carolina (d. 1999)

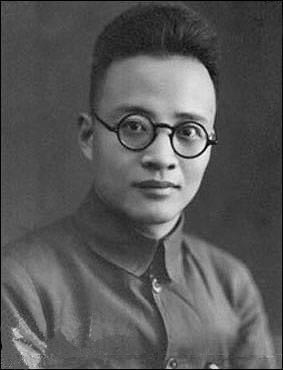
Qin Banxian

- Died: Qin Bangxian, (alias Bo Gu), 38, General Secretary of the Chinese Communist Party, 1932–35, Ye Ting, Deng Fa and others in a plane crash while en route from Chongqing to Yan'an.

== April 9, 1946 (Tuesday) ==
- The Montreal Canadiens won the Stanley Cup, defeating the Boston Bruins 6–3 to win the series in five games.
- Angkatan Udara Republik Indonesia (AURI), the Indonesian Air Force, was formally established, drawing primarily from a fleet of about 50 captured Japanese airplanes.
- The University of Bergen was founded in Norway.

== April 10, 1946 (Wednesday) ==
- In Japan's first multiparty election since 1937, women were allowed to vote for the first time as 2,770 candidates vied for 464 seats in the House of Representatives of Japan. The Liberal Party, led by Ichirō Hatoyama, won 142 seats, followed by the Progressive Party (94) and the Japanese Socialist Party (92), but Hatoyama was not allowed by the Allied occupation authorities to serve as Prime Minister, because of prior service in the enemy government.
- The Federal Communications Commission approved the first expansion of long-distance telephone calling since before World War II, as AT&T was granted the right to add 1,000 new phone circuits.

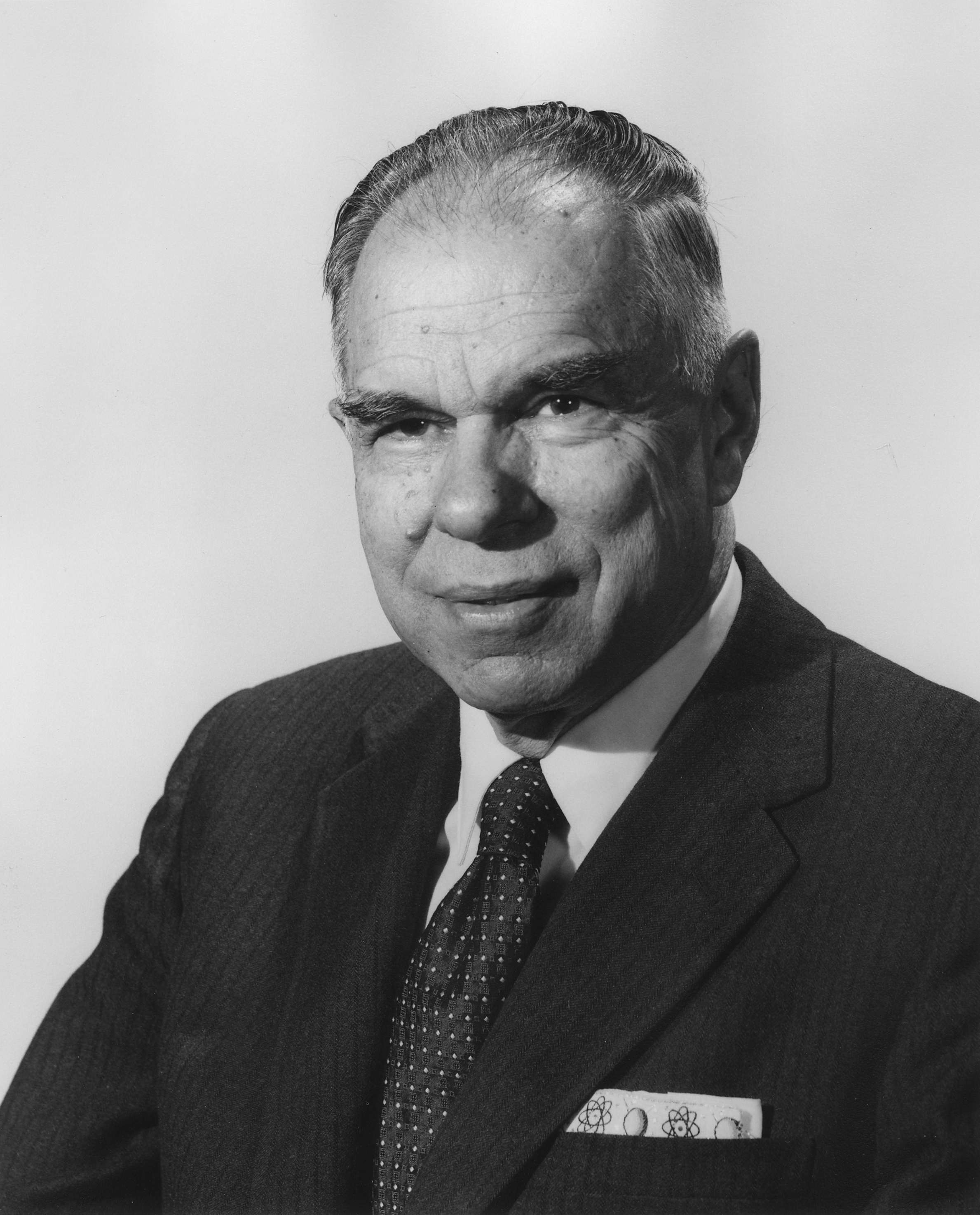
Seaborg

- At the annual meeting of the American Chemical Society in Atlantic City, Dr. Glenn T. Seaborg announced the names for the two newest elements which had been created in 1946 at the University of California. Element 95 was dubbed americium and Element 96 was curium.

== April 11, 1946 (Thursday) ==
- The French National Assembly passed a resolution sponsored by deputy Félix Houphouët-Boigny of the Ivory Coast, finally outlawing the practice of "forced labor", in France's overseas territories. Until that time, it was permissible for the colonial government to require adult males in the African colonies to work on government projects, without remuneration, for a set number of days in each year. On the island of Madagascar, Malagasy men had to labor a minimum of fifty days on colonial projects. Houphouët-Boigny, for whom the "Loi Houphouët-Boigny" was named, would become the first President of the Ivory Coast in 1960.
- The Bell X-1 experimental jet airplane made its first powered flight, with Chalmers "Slick" Goodlin taking the first of the three prototypes, X-1-1, on a flight from the Muroc Army Air Field. The X-1-1 had first been glide-tested on January 25, 1946. On October 14, 1947, Chuck Yeager would fly the X-1-1 at faster than the speed of sound.
- Born: Bob Harris, radio presenter in Northampton, England

== April 12, 1946 (Friday) ==
- British war hero Harold Alexander, 1st Earl Alexander of Tunis, took office as the 17th Governor General of Canada, serving until 1952.
- The Goodyear Tire and Rubber Company announced its plans to build dirigibles that would carry up to 300 passengers on overseas trips in the same manner as an ocean liner. None were ever put into service.
- Born:
  - Ed O'Neill, American TV actor known for Modern Family and Married... with Children; in Youngstown, Ohio
  - John Dunsworth, Canadian TV Actor (Trailer Park Boys) (d. 2017)
- Died: "Chips", 6, mixed breed dog who was awarded the Purple Heart and the Distinguished Service Cross for combat during World War II (both were later rescinded); of kidney failure.

== April 13, 1946 (Saturday) ==
- A group of Jewish employees at a bakery in Nuremberg placed arsenic on the bottom of thousands of loaves of bread to be delivered to a prisoner-of-war camp housing former members of the German SS. In all, 2,283 SS men at Stalag 13 became ill, none fatally, in the week that followed.
- In France, the "Loi Marthe Richard" took effect, and the system of government-regulated houses of prostitution came to an end. The 1,400 brothels, including 200 in Paris, were closed.
- "Arzamas-16" was established by the Soviet government at the site of the Russian town of Sarov, as a secret center for the construction of nuclear weapons.
- British Prime Minister Clement Attlee authorized Sir Stafford Cripps, the leader of the Cabinet Mission to British India, to agree to the partition of the colony into separate nations. The predominantly Hindu provinces became the Dominion of India, while the mostly Muslim provinces became the Dominion of Pakistan (and, later, Pakistan and Bangladesh).
- Rikichi Andō, the last Japanese Governor-General of Taiwan, was captured by Nationalist forces and charged with war crimes. He committed suicide one week later.
- Born: Al Green, American soul and gospel singer, in Forrest City, Arkansas
- Died: Miss Elsie Marks, who worked in carnivals for 20 years as the "Cobra Woman", after being bitten by a diamondback rattlesnake during a performance in Long Beach, California. Her autopsy confirmed that the Cobra Woman had been a man, Alexander Marks.

== April 14, 1946 (Sunday) ==
- Sh'erit ha-Pletah members of Nakam, the "Jewish Avengers", carried out a plan to poison as many former members of Hitler's SS. After the war, thousands of former SS men were detained at Stalag XIII-D in Nuremberg. When the avenging group learned that most of the bread supplied to the prison camp came from a single bakery, one of the group's members, Arye Distel, obtained a job as an apprentice baker. Over a period of several days, Distel smuggled bottles of arsenic fluid into the bakery and, on April 13, he and four other members brushed the poison on 3,000 loaves of bread to be delivered to Stalag XIII-D. "How many of those SS men actually died following the poisoning at Stalag 13 has never been verified", The Guardian would report more than 60 years later, "but some put the figure at several hundred, others at a thousand."
- Chinese Communist leader Zhou Enlai announced the beginning of a war against the Nationalist government of Chiang Kai-shek, one day after Soviet troops had withdrawn from Manchuria. The Communist forces attacked Changchun on the same day and captured it by April 17.

== April 15, 1946 (Monday) ==
- The first television network was created, as the DuMont Television Network linked New York and Washington by coaxial cable. A two-hour program featuring speeches, "along with a short play, a quiz show, and a dance routine" were broadcast simultaneously on both stations.
- Frozen concentrated orange juice was first put on sale, by Florida Foods Corporation, as shipments arrived from a plant in Plymouth, Florida, under the name "Minute Maid"
- Production began of the first Nikon cameras. The Japanese Optical Company (Nippon Kogaku) had manufactured lenses since 1917.
- For the first time since 1933, the Jewish observance of Passover was legally held in Germany.
- The United States Army revealed the existence of its previously secret night vision device, the "Snooperscope", which had been used by Army snipers during the Second World War.
- The daily comic strip Mark Trail, created by Ed Dodd and showcasing the adventures of a park ranger, made its debut, syndicated by the New York Post.
- Died: Thomas Dixon Jr., 92, American author

== April 16, 1946 (Tuesday) ==
- The United States made its first successful launch of a V-2 rocket, captured from Germany and tested at the White Sands Proving Ground. In all, 63 were fired for various purposes as part of American development of its own missile program.
- The mining firm Western Holdings Ltd. announced the discovery, at Odendaalsrus of the richest gold vein ever found in South Africa, setting off the first gold rush since before World War II. The yield was 62 ounces per ton, compared to 1/4 ounce per ton in most South African ore.
- Baseball Commissioner A.B. Chandler announced a five-year suspension of any American players who broke their contracts to sign with Jorge Pasquel's Mexican League. Twenty major leaguers had been signed away after Pasquel attempted to compete against the American and National Leagues.
- In the eight opening games for the 16 major league teams, a record 236,730 turned out. Among 18,261 who watched the Boston Braves beat the visiting Brooklyn Dodgers, 5–3, more than 300 discovered that they had been sitting in wet paint.
- The world learned for the first time of a coal mine disaster that had killed 1,549 miners—mostly Chinese and Korean, laboring for a Japanese company – four years after it had happened. The April 16, 1942, explosion had been kept secret, even from the Tokyo government, by Japanese military officials.
- Born: Moni Ovadia, Italian-Bulgarian actor, in Plodiv.

== April 17, 1946 (Wednesday) ==
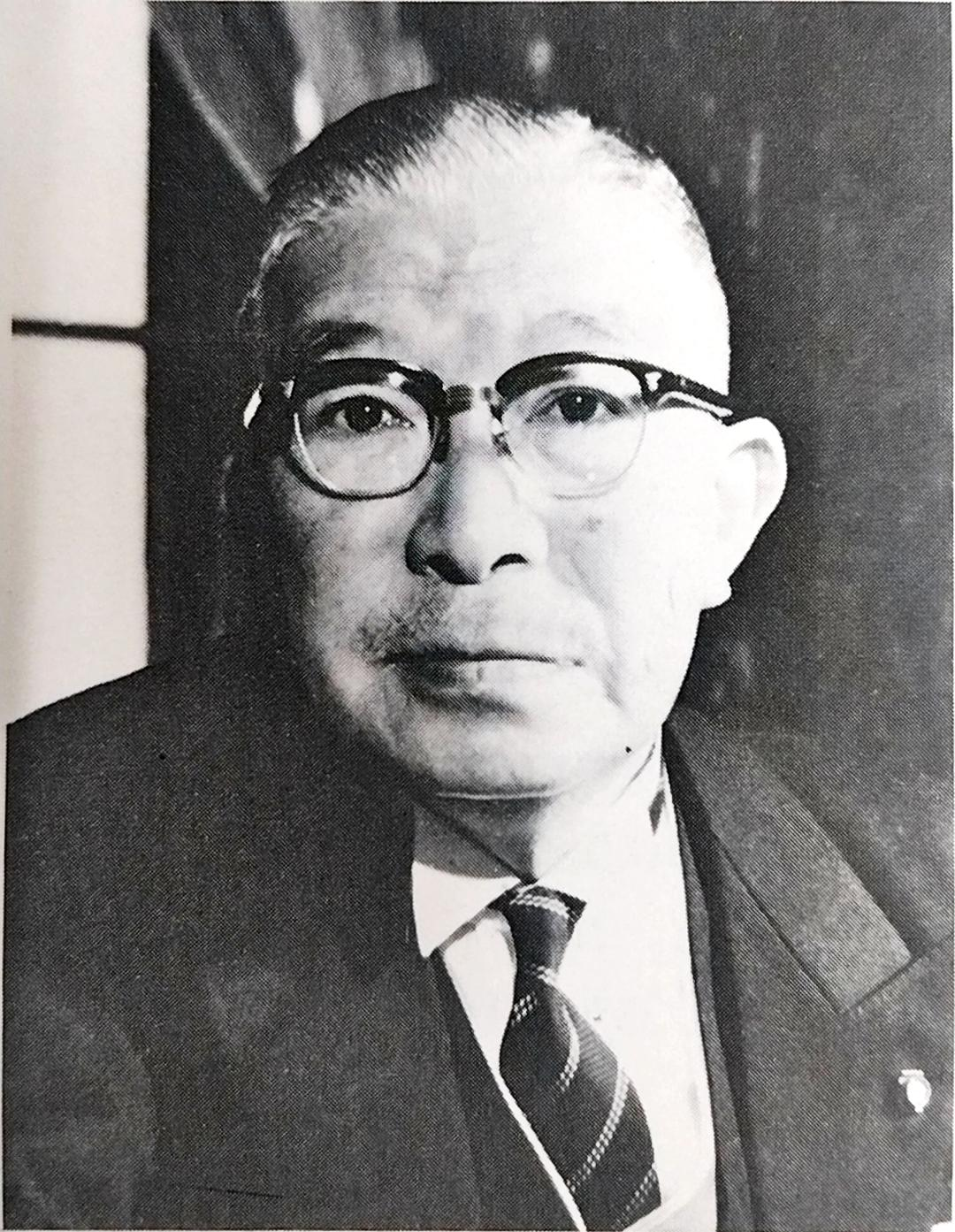
Hatoyama, barred from serving as Japanese premier

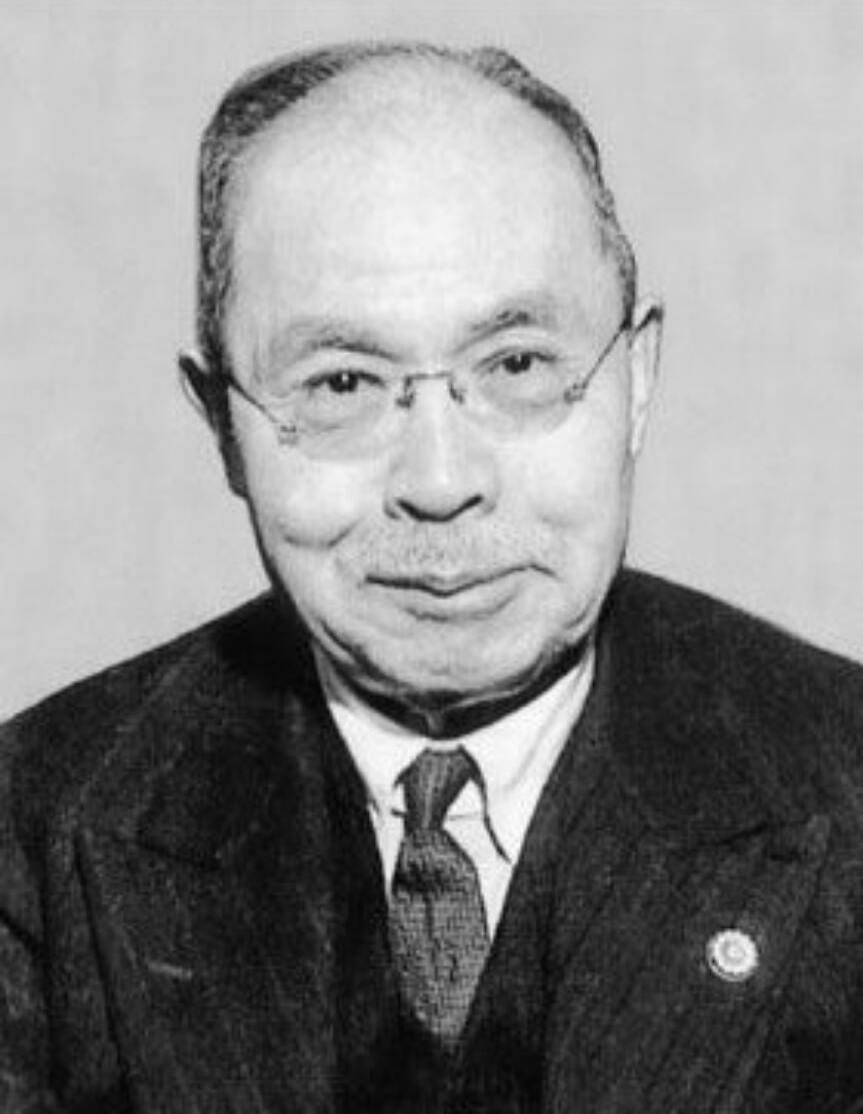
American selection Shidehara

- In the first large scale protest against American occupation since Japan's 1945 surrender, an estimated 200,000 Japanese demonstrators marched in Tokyo in protest against the U.S.-selected Prime Minister, Kijūrō Shidehara. The demonstration began after the U.S. had barred Ichirō Hatoyama, leader of the Liberal Party that won a majority in the April 10 election, from serving in public office and announced that Shidehara would take office instead. The Supreme Commander Allied Powers sent in U.S. occupation soldiers to disperse the crowd.
- Syria's independence from France was made complete with the withdrawal of the last occupying forces from that nation. April 17 is still recognized as "evacuation day".
- The Western film The Virginian starring Joel McCrea, Brian Donlevy, Sonny Tufts and Barbara Britton was released.
- In Florence, the 23. Congress of the Italian socialist Party, the first after the fall of the fascism, ends. It has seen a harsh confrontation between the Pietro Nenni’s left, pro-communist, and the Giuseppe Saragat’s right, reformist. Ivan Matteo Lombardo, a low-profile figure, not bound to any current, is elected secretary of the party.
- Umberto Nobile announces his candidature for the Italian general election as independent in the PCI list. For this, the polar explorer is at once expulsed from the Pontifical Academy of Sciences.
- Died: Jack Quinn, 62, American baseball player 1909–1933, and one of the last three who could legally throw a "spitball"

== April 18, 1946 (Thursday) ==
- The 34-member League of Nations, in its last meeting, transferred its assets to the United Nations and disbanded at midnight Geneva time (2300 GMT).
- The International Court of Justice, established by the United Nations and often referred to as the World Court, held its first meeting, assembling at The Hague.
- The United States gave full diplomatic recognition to the government of Josip Broz Tito in Yugoslavia.
- Twelve coal miners near Radford, Virginia, were killed in a methane explosion.
- Jackie Robinson made his debut in "organized baseball", appearing for the minor league Montreal Royals after having played for the Kansas City Monarchs in the Negro American League.

== April 19, 1946 (Friday) ==
- The Constituent Assembly of France voted 309–249 to approve a new Constitution for what would be called the "French Fourth Republic" subject to approval at a referendum set for May 5, under which a unicameral legislature would replace the existing Senate and Chamber of Deputies.
- Belmont, West Virginia, and Farmers Branch, Texas, were both incorporated as cities.
- Born: Tim Curry, British actor, vocalist, and composer, in Grappenhall
- Died: Walter Dandy, 60, pioneering American neurosurgeon

== April 20, 1946 (Saturday) ==
- The Anglo-American Committee of Inquiry issued its recommendations on the future of Palestine, including allowing up to 100,000 Jewish refugees from Europe to be resettled in the area, but barring a Jewish state.
- The residents of Lake Success, New York, a village on Long Island, voted 118–70 to temporarily house the headquarters of the United Nations, at the old Sperry Gyroscope Company plant.
- Stylianos Kyriakides won the Boston Marathon.
- Born:
  - Julien Poulin, Canadian actor; in Montreal
  - Sandro Chia, Italian artist; in Florence
- Died:
  - Mae Busch, 54, American film actress in the Laurel and Hardy comedies
  - Ernesto Buonaiuti, 64, Italian theologian, exponent of Modernism

== April 21, 1946 (Sunday) ==
- The Socialist Unity Party of Germany (Sozialistische Einheitspartei Deutschlands or SED), with one million members, was created in the Soviet zone of Germany (later East Germany) by the merger of the Communist Party and the Social Democratic Party. The SED would govern East Germany from 1946 until 1990.
- The Columbia Broadcasting System (CBS) made the first successful transmission of its system of color television, in a format that could be received by both black-and-white and color television sets.
- in Milan, "red Eastern". An armed riot broke out in San Vittore Prison, led by the gangster Enzo Barbieri and the former gerarca Giulio Caradonna. The rebels (both common criminals and fascists jailed for political reasons) surrendered on April 24, after the Army’s intervention. The final toll was five victims (four inmates and the warden Salvatore Rap).
- The Roman daily newspaper Il Messaggero, after a two-year suspension, resumed publications with the headline Il nuovo messaggero. The director was Arrigo Jacchia, a Jewish journalist and victim of the Fascist racial laws.

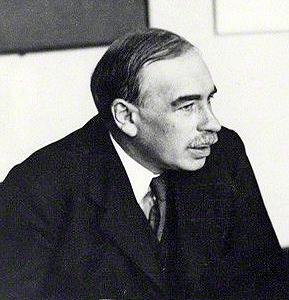
Keynes

- Died: John Maynard Keynes, 62, British economist for whom Keynesian economics is named

== April 22, 1946 (Monday) ==
- Harlan Fiske Stone, the 73-year-old Chief Justice of the United States, was announcing his dissenting opinion in the case of Girouard v. United States, when he had the onset of a stroke. Stone was taken by ambulance to his home and died of a cerebral thrombosis that evening.
- John F. Kennedy, the 28-year-old son of former U.S. Ambassador to Britain Joseph P. Kennedy, announced his candidacy for the U.S. House of Representatives.
- A woman in Bacacay, Brazil, was reported to have given birth to two boys and eight girls, an item listed under "Highest number at a single birth" in The Guinness Book of Records.
- In Italy, the Liberation Day is declared national holiday.

== April 23, 1946 (Tuesday) ==
- Manuel Roxas was elected as the first President of the Third Republic of the Philippines, as well as the last President (equivalent to Governor) of the Commonwealth of the Philippines, defeating incumbent Sergio Osmeña in advance of scheduled independence.
- The patent for the first Vespa motor scooter was filed, by the Italian company Societa Rinaldo Piaggio. Inexpensive, reliable and fast, the Vespa soon became popular worldwide.
- Grave robbers in Milan stole the remains of Benito Mussolini from an unmarked pauper's grave. The body, taken by admirers of Italy's Fascist dictator, was located on August 12 at a monastery in Pavia.
- The Eastern Pennsylvania Basketball League, which went on to become the minor league Continental Basketball Association, was founded. The CBA played for 64 seasons before folding in 2009.
- A 19-year-old sailor, on the U.S. Navy tank landing ship USS LST-172, shot to death nine of his shipmates before being overpowered. Seaman 2nd class William Vincent Smith made the attack while the boat was cruising on the Yangtze River. Smith hanged himself in jail on August 2, 1947, while awaiting a court martial.
- Howard Hughes's Western movie The Outlaw (US, 1943), starring Jane Russell, went on general release.
- Ed Head of the Brooklyn Dodgers pitched a 5–0 no-hitter against the Boston Braves at Ebbets Field.

== April 24, 1946 (Wednesday) ==
- In the United States, the Blue Angels stunt flying team was formed by the U.S. Navy.
- In the Soviet Union, two new fighter jets—the MiG-9, flown by Alexei Grinchik, and the Yak-15, piloted by Mikhail I. Ivanov—both flew for the first time. A coin toss determined that the MiG was allowed to take off first.
- In France, the Constituent Assembly voted 487 to 63 to nationalize the insurance industry, taking over fifty large companies.

== April 25, 1946 (Thursday) ==
- Forty-seven people were killed and 127 injured in a railroad accident at Naperville, Illinois, when the Burlington Railroad's "Exposition Flyer" crashed at 1:06 pm (CST) into the same line's "Advance Flyer", which had stalled after an earlier departure from Chicago.
- A Marian apparition, wherein observers see the Virgin Mary appear before them, was first reported to have happened near the Bavarian village of Marienfried. The Virgin's appearance was repeated on May 25 and June 25, and the shrine of "Our Lady of Marienfried" was established.

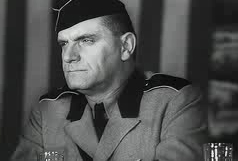
American Fuehrer Kuhn

- Fritz Kuhn, the would-be American fuehrer who led the Nazi German American Bund, was released from an internment camp in his native Germany, after American authorities concluded that he no longer posed a threat to security.
- A general election was held in Southern Rhodesia, the first since the Second World War. The United Party of Prime Minister Godfrey Huggins lost its overall majority but remained in power.
- A conference began in Paris, of the foreign ministers of the four major Allied nations of World War II. For the first time, the French representative (Georges Bidault) took part in the Council of Foreign Ministers, together with James B. Byrnes (U.S.), Ernest Bevin (UK) and Vyacheslav Molotov (USSR).
- Born:
  - Talia Shire, American actress nominated for Academy Awards for The Godfather Part II and Rocky; in Lake Success, New York
  - Strobe Talbott, American foreign policy analyst; in Dayton, Ohio
  - John Fox, British statistician
  - Vladimir Zhirinovsky, Russian politician and leader of Russia's Liberal Democratic Party; in Alma-Ata, Kazakh SSR, Soviet Union (d. 2022)

== April 26, 1946 (Friday) ==
- The port of Harbin, tenth largest city in China, was taken over by Chinese Communist forces without incident.
- The town of Pemberton, Minnesota, was incorporated.
- Born: Marilyn Nelson, American poet, in Cleveland

== April 27, 1946 (Saturday) ==
- The "Whirlaway", the first successful helicopter to have twin engines and twin rotors, was flown for the first time, with test pilot Charles R. Wood taking it up. Made by McDonnell Aircraft, the helicopter was designed so that if the engine powering one rotor failed, the remaining engine could still power both rotors, making helicopters safe to use.
- In the first FA Cup Final to be played since 1939, Derby County beat Charlton Athletic 4–1.
- Vittorio De Sica’s film Shoeshine was released in Milan and Rome. In Italy, the film was, at first, a commercial failure; it later gained international success and became a classic of cinema.

== April 28, 1946 (Sunday) ==
- In Dresden, elections in the American zone in occupied Germany were disrupted by rioting. A crowd of Jewish displaced persons, estimated by American officers at 5,000 or more, marched into town after two security guards went missing, and attacks were made on polling places. Rioting continued for 5 1/2 hours until the U.S. Army forced the participants back to the displaced persons camp. The elections throughout the zone attracted 5.5 million voters for local government offices.
- The Pestalozzi Children's Village (Kinderdorf Pestalozzi) was established at Trogen in Switzerland to accommodate and educate children orphaned by World War II, according to Pestalozzian principles.
- The Chinese city of Qiqihar, with several million residents, became the third major metropolitan area to surrender to the Chinese Communist government.
- In Rome, the first Congress of the Christian Democracy party ended. Alcide De Gasperi was confirmed as secretary of the party. Concerning the institutional referendum, the Congress voted by majority (60%) for the Republic, but the party left freedom of choice to its members and electors.
- Died: Adolfo Omodeo, 56, Italian historian, former Minister of Public Education

== April 29, 1946 (Monday) ==
- International Military Tribunal for the Far East: Former Japanese Prime Ministers Hideki Tojo (1941–44), Hiranuma Kiichirō (1939), Kōki Hirota (1936–37) and Kuniaki Koiso (1944–45), and 24 co-defendants were indicted in Tokyo for war crimes, ranging from the murder of thousands of Americans at Pearl Harbor, to conspiracy "to secure military, naval, political and economic domination of the whole world". All of the surviving members of Tojo's cabinet members were included in the 55 count indictment.
- The University of Batangas was founded in the Philippines.
- Died: James Larkin White, 63, who, in 1898, had discovered the Carlsbad Caverns

== April 30, 1946 (Tuesday) ==
- The Bell Trade Act was passed by the United States Congress in advance of granting political independence to the Philippines. The effect of the legislation was to continue American control of the ...
- Bob Feller of the Cleveland Indians pitched his second career no-hitter, defeating the New York Yankees 1–0 at Yankee Stadium.
- in Rome, a commando of the neo-fascist group FAR seized the radio station in Monte Mario and aired the hymn Giovinezza and a statement. The same evening, some bombs were dropped against the seat of PCI and the typography of L'Unità.
- Born: Carl XVI Gustaf, King of Sweden since 1973; in Solna
