= March 1946 =

Month of 1946

<<	March 1946					>>
Su	Mo	Tu	We	Th	Fr	Sa
					1	2
3	4	5	6	7	8	9
10	11	12	13	14	15	16
17	18	19	20	21	22	23
24	25	26	27	28	29	30
31

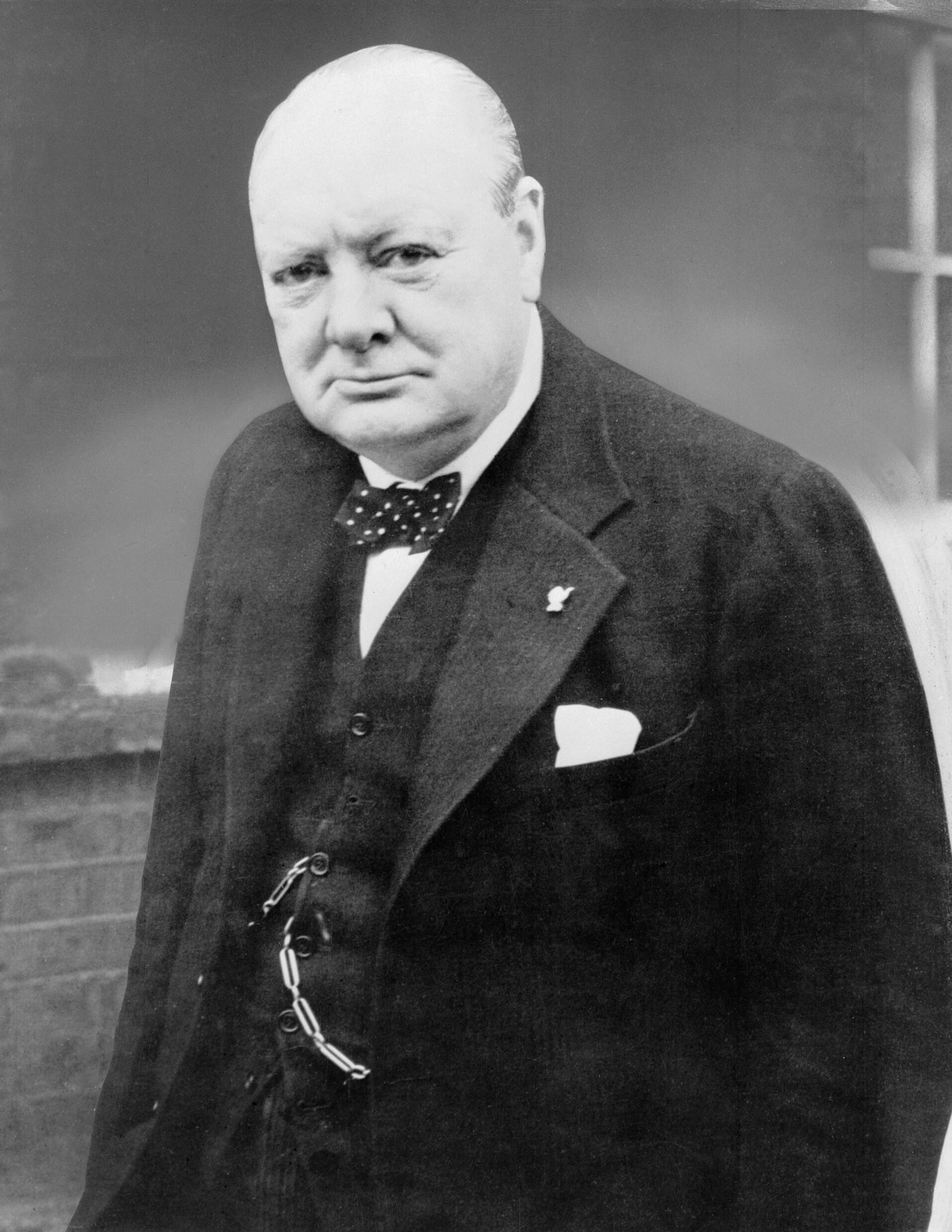
March 5, 1946: Former British Prime Minister Churchill delivers the "Iron Curtain speech"

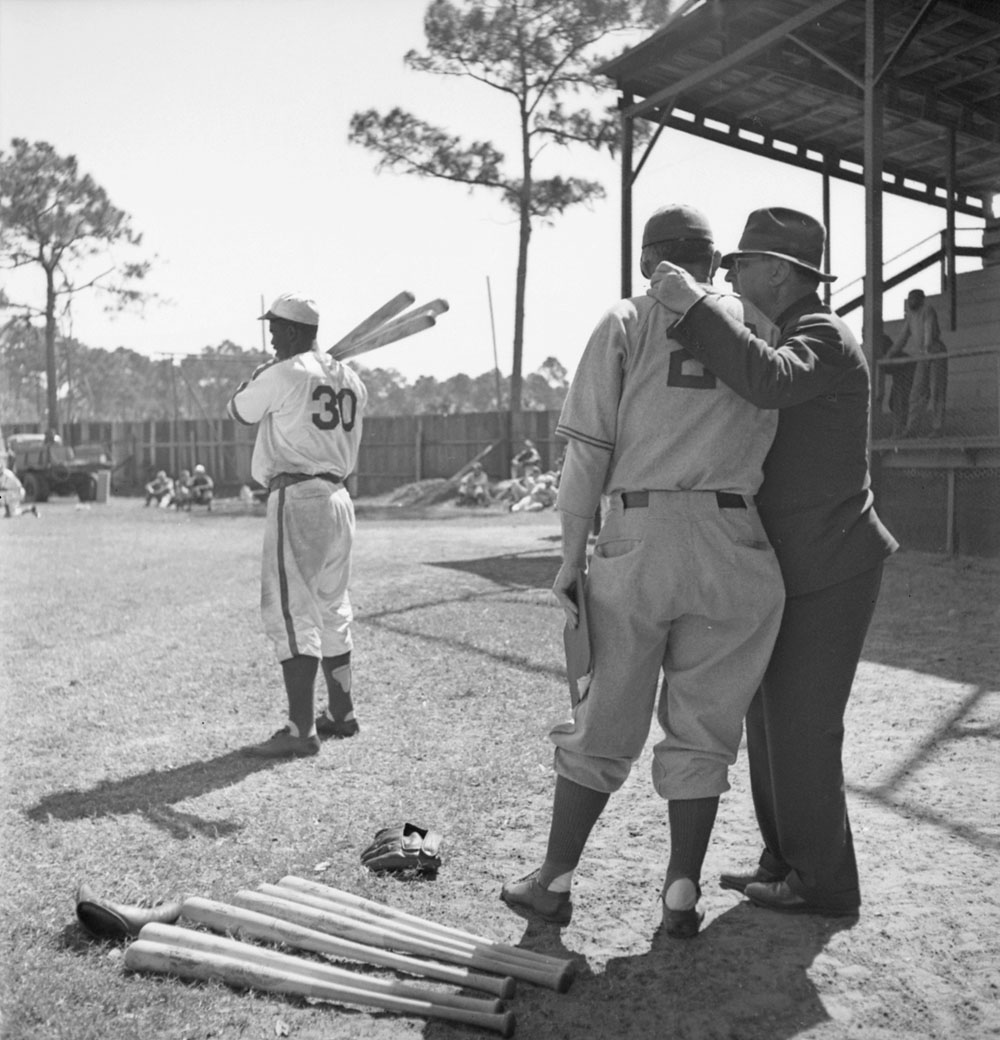
March 6, 1946: Jackie Robinson (#30), Negro player signed into Brooklyn Dodgers farm system

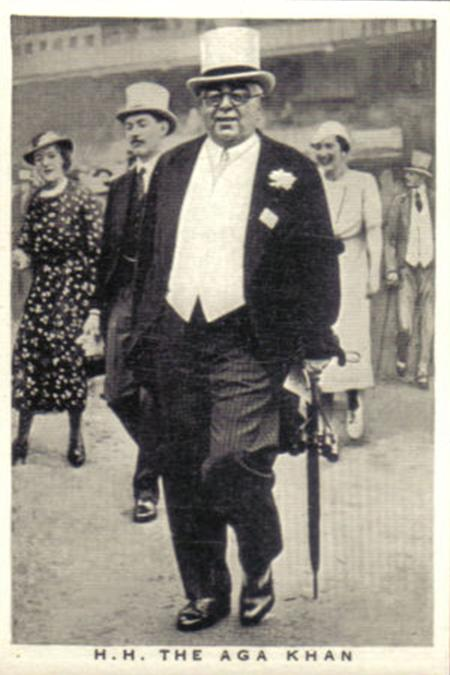
March 10, 1946: The Aga Khan is given his weight in diamonds

The following events occurred in March 1946:

== March 1, 1946 (Friday) ==
- North Korea's Communist Party leader and future president, Kim Il Sung, was saved from assassination by an alert Soviet officer. Y.T. Novichenko caught a hand grenade that had been thrown at Kim during a rally.
- Operation Coronet, the greatest amphibious invasion ever planned, had been tentatively scheduled for "Y-Day", March 1, 1946. The invasion by 25 divisions of Allied forces of Honshū, the main island of Japan, would have been resisted by the Japanese in Operation Ketsu-Go, and would have followed the November 1, 1945, invasion of Kyūshū. Following the surrender of Japan in 1945, Olympic, Coronet and Ketsu-Go became unnecessary.
- Born: Jan Kodeš, Czech tennis player who won the French Open in 1970 and 1971 and Wimbledon in 1973); in Prague

== March 2, 1946 (Saturday) ==
- The United Nations would not be welcome to locate permanently in Greenwich, Connecticut, the UNO's first choice for a site. In a special referendum, the vote was 4,540 to 2,019 against letting the UNO build in Greenwich and its surrounding area. The U.N. headquarters was built instead in New York City.
- The British armed forces began to withdraw from Iran following the 1941 Anglo-Soviet invasion of Iran after the UK and the Soviet Union had signed a treaty stipulating that withdrawal would take place six months after the end of World War II, which was officially closed on September 2, 1945. However, the Soviet Union refused to join in withdrawing, and, after having set up two Communist republics in Iran, the Azerbaijan People's Government and the Republic of Mahabad.

== March 3, 1946 (Sunday) ==
- An American Airlines DC-3 crashed into a mountain at 7:53 am PST as it approached San Diego on a flight from Tucson, killing all 27 persons on board. Flight 6-103 had originated in New York, with multiple stops on the way to San Diego.

== March 4, 1946 (Monday) ==
- Iran crisis: fifteen Soviet armored brigades invaded Iran's Azerbaijan region, while additional brigades deployed along the borders of Turkey, Iraq and Bulgaria. The U.S. Consul at Tabriz would later opine that "Though not a shot was fired, the Battle of Azerbaijan was as significant in its outcome as Bunker Hill, Bull Run, or the First Battle of the Marne."
- Carl Gustaf Emil Mannerheim resigned as President of Finland because of illness, and was succeeded by Prime Minister Juho Passikivi.
- The U.S., Britain and France joined in asking the Spanish people to depose dictator Francisco Franco, based on the Generalissimo's August 15, 1940, letter to Benito Mussolini. Franco had offered support of the Axis Powers, and signed a secret protocol with Germany on February 10, 1943. Franco remained until his death in 1975.
- The comic strip Rip Kirby, by Alex Raymond, began a 53-year run in the newspapers as a King Features Syndicate feature. The fictional detective's last strip ran on June 26, 1999.
- The city of Riverdale, Utah, was incorporated.
- Born:
  - Michael Ashcroft, British billionaire; in Chichester, West Sussex
  - Harvey Goldsmith, British concert promoter; in Edgware, Middlesex
  - Haile Gerima, Ethiopian filmmaker; in Gondar
- Died: Bror von Blixen-Finecke, 79, Danish big-game hunter

== March 5, 1946 (Tuesday) ==
- Winston Churchill delivered his famous "Iron Curtain" speech at Westminster College in Fulton, Missouri. The former British prime minister was accompanied by U.S. president Harry S. Truman, and the speech – which was entitled "The Sinews of Peace" was part of a program that began at 3:30 pm CST, after an invocation and introductory remarks by Westminster's president McCluer and by President Truman. Churchill surprised the world with his attack on the spread of Soviet Communism, as he said "From Stettin in the Baltic to Trieste in the Adriatic, an iron curtain has descended across the Continent." Using the metaphor of an iron curtain (used at theaters for fire protection), to refer to the sealing off of a conquered area, was not invented by Churchill, nor did he first use it at Westminster College.
- Died: Gertrude Pinsky, David Guzik and eight other persons on a mission for the Jewish relief organization JDC (Joint Distribution Committee) were killed in a plane crash near Prague. One of the few women assigned overseas by JDC, Ms. Pinsky had overseen the aid to thousands of Jewish displaced persons during the Second World War.

== March 6, 1946 (Wednesday) ==
- Ho–Sainteny Agreement: North Vietnam agreed to allow French troops to return in exchange for recognition as a "free state" within the framework of the French Union. The agreement created a temporary coexistence between the communist-controlled state and the French, strengthening the Viet Minh's position while weakening non-communist nationalist forces.
- Jackie Robinson became the first African-American in the 20th Century to play in the Major League Baseball system, appearing in a Florida spring training game at Daytona Beach against the Brooklyn Dodgers as a shortstop for the Dodgers' farm club, the Montreal Royals.
- The drama film Sentimental Journey starring John Payne and Maureen O'Hara premiered in New York City.
- Born: David Gilmour, English rock musician (Pink Floyd); in Cambridge

== March 7, 1946 (Thursday) ==
- The 167 residents of the Bikini Atoll, in the Marshall Islands, were evacuated from their South Pacific island in order for atomic testing to begin. A report to the U.S. Congress calculated loss-of-use damages fifty years later at $278,000,000.
- Five days after the March 2 deadline had passed for Soviet troops to leave Iran, the U.S. Embassy in Moscow served a diplomatic note on the Soviet Foreign Ministry, calling on the Soviets to honor their agreement.
- Born:
  - John Heard, American actor; in Washington, D.C. (d. 2017)
  - Peter Wolf (stage name for Peter W. Blankfield), American rock musician for The J. Geils Band; in the Bronx, New York

== March 8, 1946 (Friday) ==
- Helicopters were first approved for civilian use in the United States, when the Civil Aeronautics Board granted a certificate to Bell Helicopter for its Bell 47, a modified version of its H-13 Sioux military chopper.
- Died: Frederick W. Lanchester, 77, British automotive inventor and engineer

== March 9, 1946 (Saturday) ==
- Thirty-three British football fans were killed, and hundreds injured, when retaining fences at the Burnden Park stadium in Bolton collapsed. A reported 70,000 fans had filled the stadium to watch a FA Cup playoff match between Bolton Wanderers and Stoke City. The game, which ended 0–0, halted for 28 minutes and then resumed.
- "Oh! What It Seemed to Be" by Frankie Carle hit #1 on the Billboard Honor Roll of Hits.
- Died: John J. Glennon, 81, an Irish native who became the Roman Catholic Archbishop of St. Louis, died ten days after he had been elevated by Pope Pius XII to the College of Cardinals. Glennon was in Dublin, where he had stopped on his way home from Rome. The Cardinal Glennon Children's Hospital was named in his memory.

== March 10, 1946 (Sunday) ==
- In a ceremony witnessed by 100,000 followers at the Brabourne Stadium in Bombay, the Aga Khan, leader of British India's Shia Ismaili Muslim population, received his weight—248 pounds—in diamonds, in honor of his 60 years (Diamond Anniversary) on the throne. For his golden anniversary in 1936, he had received his weight (238 lb.) in gold.
- All 25 persons on an Australian National Airways flight were killed when their plane crashed at 8:50 pm, shortly after takeoff from Hobart, Tasmania.
- At a synod, convened in Lviv under pressure from the Soviet government, the Ukrainian Greek Catholic Church severed its historic ties with the Church in Rome, and its union with the Russian Orthodox Church was proclaimed.
- Born: Jim Valvano, American college basketball coach who led North Carolina State to the 1983 NCAA championship;, in New York City (d. 1993)
- Died: Karl Haushofer, 76, German political scientist and proponent of Geopolitik, died by suicide along with his wife.

== March 11, 1946 (Monday) ==
- Rudolf Höss, the Nazi Commandant of the Auschwitz concentration camp, was located and arrested by British military police near the northern German town of Flensburg, where he had been working on a farm under the alias "Franz Lang". Höss, who confessed to overseeing the murder of millions of prisoners, mostly Jewish, was himself executed at Auschwitz on April 16, 1947.
- In New York, Sylvia Lawry and 20 neurologists founded the Association for Advancement of Research in Multiple Sclerosis, now the National Multiple Sclerosis Society.

== March 12, 1946 (Tuesday) ==
- General Draža Mihailović, Chetnik leader who oversaw the massacre of Bosnians and Croatians during the Nazi occupation of Yugoslavia, was captured in a mountain cave near Višegrad after two years in hiding. His capture was announced in Belgrade on March 24, and Mihailović was executed on July 17.
- Born:
  - Liza Minnelli, American singer, stage and film actress, winner of a Best Actress Oscar, an Emmy, a Grammy and two Tony Awards; in Los Angeles as the daughter of film actress Judy Garland and theatrical director Vincente Minnelli
  - Dean Cundey, American cinematographer known for the Back to the Future series of films; in Alhambra, California
  - Frank Welker, American voice actor known for voicing the character of Fred in the Scooby-Doo cartoon franchise; in Denver.
- Died: Ferenc Szálasi, 49, strongman of the "Hungarian State" during the Nazi occupation of Hungary, was executed by hanging for war crimes.

== March 13, 1946 (Wednesday) ==
- The United Auto Workers strike against General Motors ended after 113 days, as the UAW accepted an 18 1/2 cent per hour wage increase for its members.
- The Congress of Industrial Organizations ended its strike against General Electric.
- The world waited to see if the United States and the Soviet Union would go to war, as the Soviets defied the ultimatum of March 7, and reportedly were continuing their advance in Iran.

== March 14, 1946 (Thursday) ==
- Fred Rose, the first and only Communist Party of Canada member of the House of Commons of Canada, was arrested in Ottawa, on suspicion of espionage, after attending the opening of the new session of Parliament.
- In Paris, Gaston Monnerville, the black delegate from French Guiana, was elected President of the French National Assembly.

== March 15, 1946 (Friday) ==
- Clement Attlee, the prime minister of the United Kingdom, declared in the House of Commons the government's intention to grant British India its independence. "India herself must choose as to what will be her future situation and her position in the world", said Attlee, adding that "If ... she elects for independence—and in our view she has a right to do so—it will be for us to help make the transition as smooth and easy as possible."
- The Soviet Constitution was amended to increase the number of republics in the U.S.S.R. from 11 to 16, and to give the head of each republic a position in the Supreme Soviet of the Soviet Union.
- Romulo Betancourt, President of Venezuela, granted women, for the first time, the right to vote in that nation.
- Born:
  - Bobby Bonds, American MLB baseball outfielder; in Riverside, California (d. 2003)
  - Mahir Çayan, Turkish communist revolutionary and the leader of People's Liberation Party-Front of Turkey; in Samsun(d. 1972)

== March 16, 1946 (Saturday) ==
- (Get Your Kicks On) Route 66, written by Bobby Troup, was recorded for the first time, by the Nat King Cole Trio, making United States Highway 66 the most famous numbered road of all time. The song has been covered many times since, most recently by John Mayer.
- George Mikan, the most popular college basketball player up to that time, turned pro, signing with the Chicago American Gears of the National Basketball League days after his DePaul University team completed its season. Mikan, who passed up graduation, began playing for the Gears days later, and would later star for the Lakers in the NBA.

== March 17, 1946 (Sunday) ==
- Soviet troops began their departure from Denmark's Bornholm Island. Soviet troops had seized the island from Nazi forces in May 1945.
- Born: Georges J. F. Köhler, German biologist, 1984 Nobel Prize in Physiology or Medicine; in Munich; (d. 1995)
- Died: Dai Li, 48, Chief of intelligence for Nationalist China, was killed in a plane crash.

== March 18, 1946 (Monday) ==
- Lavrentiy Beria was elected a full member of the Soviet Communist Party Politburo, and then promoted to the Council of Ministers in charge of state security.
- The deadline for Korean residents of Japan to apply for repatriation to Korea expired. Out of 1.1 million, there were 614,000 who moved to Korea, and all but 10,000 to the south.
- Sixty-three women were hired as the first female law enforcement officers in the history of Japan.

== March 19, 1946 (Tuesday) ==
- Mikhail Kalinin's resignation as the chairman of the Presidium of the Supreme Soviet of the Soviet Union (the figurative head of state) was accepted by the Supreme Soviet, which also re-elected Joseph Stalin as Chairman of the Council of Ministers (the head of government). Kalinin, who died on June 3, was replaced by Nikolai Shvernik.
- France gave overseas department status to Guadeloupe, French Guiana, Martinique and Reunion.
- In northern California, two separate U.S. Army plane crashes killed 33 servicemen. A B-29 bomber with seven men on board struck a 3,820-foot mountain peak near Livermore, California. In the other crash, a C-47 cargo plane with 26 on board exploded in mid air and crashed near the ghost town of Hobart Mills, California, nine days after 25 people had died in a plane crash in Hobart, Tasmania.

== March 20, 1946 (Wednesday) ==
- Tule Lake War Relocation Center, last of the Japanese-American internment camps in the United States, was closed.
- Aracaju train crash: In the worst railway accident in the history of Brazil, 185 people were killed and hundreds more were injured. The train had derailed as it was descending a mountain incline near Aracaju, in the coastal state of Sergipe.
- Died:
  - Frederick M. Smith, 72, President of the Reorganized Church of Latter Day Saints since 1915
  - Ethel Florence Lindesay Richardson, 76, Australian novelist who wrote under the pen name Henry Handel Richardson

== March 21, 1946 (Thursday) ==
- The Strategic Air Command and the Tactical Air Command were created as a prelude to the establishment of the United States Air Force.
- The Federal Rules of Criminal Procedure, promulgated by the United States Supreme Court on February 8, 1946, went into effect.
- Kenny Washington was signed to a contract with the Los Angeles Rams, becoming the first African-American to sign with the National Football League since 1933, when NFL teams excluded black players.
- Marguerite Perey presented her thesis, L'élément 87: Actinium K, at the Sorbonne, defending her proof that she had discovered the last of the natural elements. The element with atomic number 87 has, ever since, been referred to by the name proposed by Perey, in honor of her native land, "francium".
- Born: Timothy Dalton, Welsh actor; in Colwyn Bay, Clwyd
- Died: Marlin Hurt, 46, radio comedian who portrayed Beulah, the African-American maid on Fibber McGee & Molly

== March 22, 1946 (Friday) ==
- The United Kingdom and the Emirate of Transjordan signed the Treaty of London, giving Transjordan its independence while Britain would continue to maintain military bases in the country.
- The United States Army made its first successful launch of an American-built rocket out of the atmosphere, using a combination of American and German scientists in adapting the German V-2 rockets seized after the Allied victory in World War II. The Army rocket reached an altitude of about 50 miles.
- Died: Clemens von Galen, 68, German bishop who had been made a Roman Catholic cardinal by Pope Pius XII the previous month.

== March 23, 1946 (Saturday) ==
- The Rochester Royals defeated the Sheboygan Redskins, 66–48, to sweep the best of five championship of the National Basketball League. Both teams would become charter members of the National Basketball Association. The Rochester franchise moved three times and is now the Sacramento Kings.
- President Truman sent an ultimatum to Joseph Stalin demanding that the Soviets comply with their agreement to withdraw their troops from Iran.
- Argentina extended its claims over Antarctica, adding a claim of sovereignty over the portion from 68°34' W to 74°W. Argentine Antarctic Territory is claimed from 25° W to 74°W.
- Indonesia Tentara Republik Indonesia (Armed Forces of the Republic of Indonesia) or TRI evacuated Indonesian citizens from the city of Bandung, West Java, Indonesia. In an operation called "bumihangus" or "scorched earth", TRI and over 200,000 civilians purposely burned their homes in an attempt to prevent incoming Allied forces and the Netherlands-Indies Civil Administration (NICA) from being able to easily set up an army base. The event is commemorated as "Bandung Lautan Api", or "Bandung Sea of Fire".
- Died: Gilbert N. Lewis, 70, American chemist who discovered the covalent bond, died (of natural causes) while carrying out an experiment on fluorescence in his laboratory.

== March 24, 1946 (Sunday) ==
- The Cabinet Mission to India began as Lord Pethick-Lawrence, Sir Stafford Cripps, and Admiral A.V. Alexander arrived in New Delhi to begin the negotiation of self-government for the people of British India.
- BBC Home Service radio broadcast Alistair Cooke's first American Letter in the U.K. As Letter from America, this programme ran for nearly 58 years until a few weeks before Cooke's death. When the 2,869th and last weekly show was broadcast on BBC Radio 4 on February 20, 2004, it had become the longest-running radio commentary program in history.
- Richard L. Griffin and Polly Ann Moore became the first of five people to die in the Texarkana Moonlight Murders, when they were both slain near Texarkana, Texas by a serial killer. Their murders remain unsolved. Three more people would be killed over the next six weeks.
- Died: Alexander Alekhine, 53, the chess champion of the world, was found dead in his hotel room in Estoril, Portugal. The Russian chessmaster had first won the title in 1927, lost it for two years, and then had regained it in 1937.

== March 25, 1946 (Monday) ==
- A confrontation between the United States and the Soviet Union was defused when the Soviet government made the announcement, broadcast on Moscow Radio, that it would withdraw all troops from Iran within six weeks.
- The United Nations moved to its new location in New York City, not in Manhattan but in the Bronx, on the campus of Lehman College, part of the City College of New York system. Lehman and its buildings were the site of the 51-member international body for almost five months, until August 15, 1946.

== March 26, 1946 (Tuesday) ==
- U.S. president Harry S. Truman issued Executive Order 9708 under the authority of federal legislation, in the first such measure defining diseases for which a quarantine could be implemented and enforced within the United States.
- The British Broadcasting Corporation began its BBC Russian Service, broadcasting short wave radio programming toward the Soviet Union.
- Braathens, the Norwegian airline, was founded by Ludvig G. Braathen, with three DC-4 Skymasters.
- Born:
  - Johnny Crawford, American child actor who portrayed Mark McCain on The Rifleman; in Los Angeles (d. 2021)
  - Ravi Zacharias, world-renowned Christian apologist; in Madras (d. 2020)

== March 27, 1946 (Wednesday) ==
- Oklahoma State defeated North Carolina, 43–40, to win the NCAA basketball championship.
- Born: Olaf Malolepski, German musician (Die Flippers), in Knittlingen

== March 28, 1946 (Thursday) ==
- The results of the first general election in India were certified. Over a four-month period, voting was conducted for the Provincial Assemblies in each of the eleven provinces of British India. The Congress Party formed the majority in the legislatures for Bombay, Madras, Uttar Pradesh, Bihar, the Central Provinces, Orissa, Assam and the North West Frontier; while the Muslim League won power in Bengal and the Sind. In Punjab, a coalition of Unionists, Congress and Sikhs formed a ministry.
- Born: Alejandro Toledo, President of Peru 2001 to 2006, in Cabana

== March 29, 1946 (Friday) ==
- ITAM, the Instituto Tecnológico Autónomo de México, was founded in Mexico City as a private university, competing with the older UNAM (National University of Mexico).
- Died George C. L. Washington, 74, inventor, in 1910, of the first instant coffee.

== March 30, 1946 (Saturday) ==
- The longest official (soccer) football game in history took place at Edgeley Park, when Stockport County F.C. hosted Doncaster Rovers F.C. for a replay of a playoff game in Division Three of The Football League. The teams had played to a 2–2 tie at Doncaster, and were tied 2–2 at the end of 90 minutes regulation time and the extra 30 period. The "golden goal" rule then applied, with the first team to score winning in sudden death. A goal by Les Cocker of Stockport after 53 minutes was disallowed by the referee, and play continued. By 7:00 pm, the game was called after 3 hours 23 minutes of play. Doncaster won the next replay at home, 4–0, on April 3.
- Oxford won the 92nd Boat Race against Cambridge.

== March 31, 1946 (Sunday) ==
- A roundup of Nazi activists was carried out throughout the American and British zones of Germany, with 7,000 Allied soldiers serving the warrants. What was described as "a well-financed attempt to revive Nazism" was foiled after the December 1945 capture of ringleader Artur Axmann.
- Under the supervision of Allied observers, the first elections in Greece since 1936 took place. The Communist Party of Greece (KKE) refused to participate, and a coalition led by the People's Party won 206 of the 354 seats available in the Hellenic Parliament. Konstantinos Tsaldaris became Prime Minister of the new government.
- Russia, one of three Soviet members of the United Nations, paid its U.N. dues of $1,725,000 and ended concern that the Soviets were planning to withdraw from the international organization.
- Died: John Vereker, 6th Viscount Gort, 59, British Field Marshal
