= History of Rio de Janeiro =

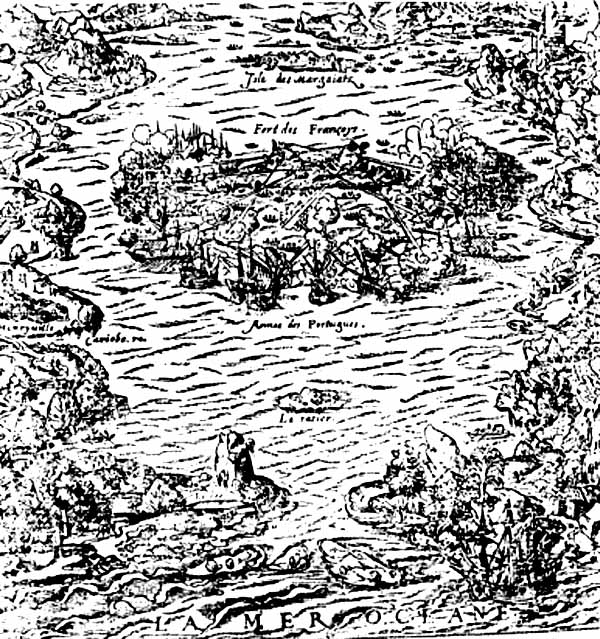
Attack of French Villegagnon island by the Portuguese on 15 March 1560.

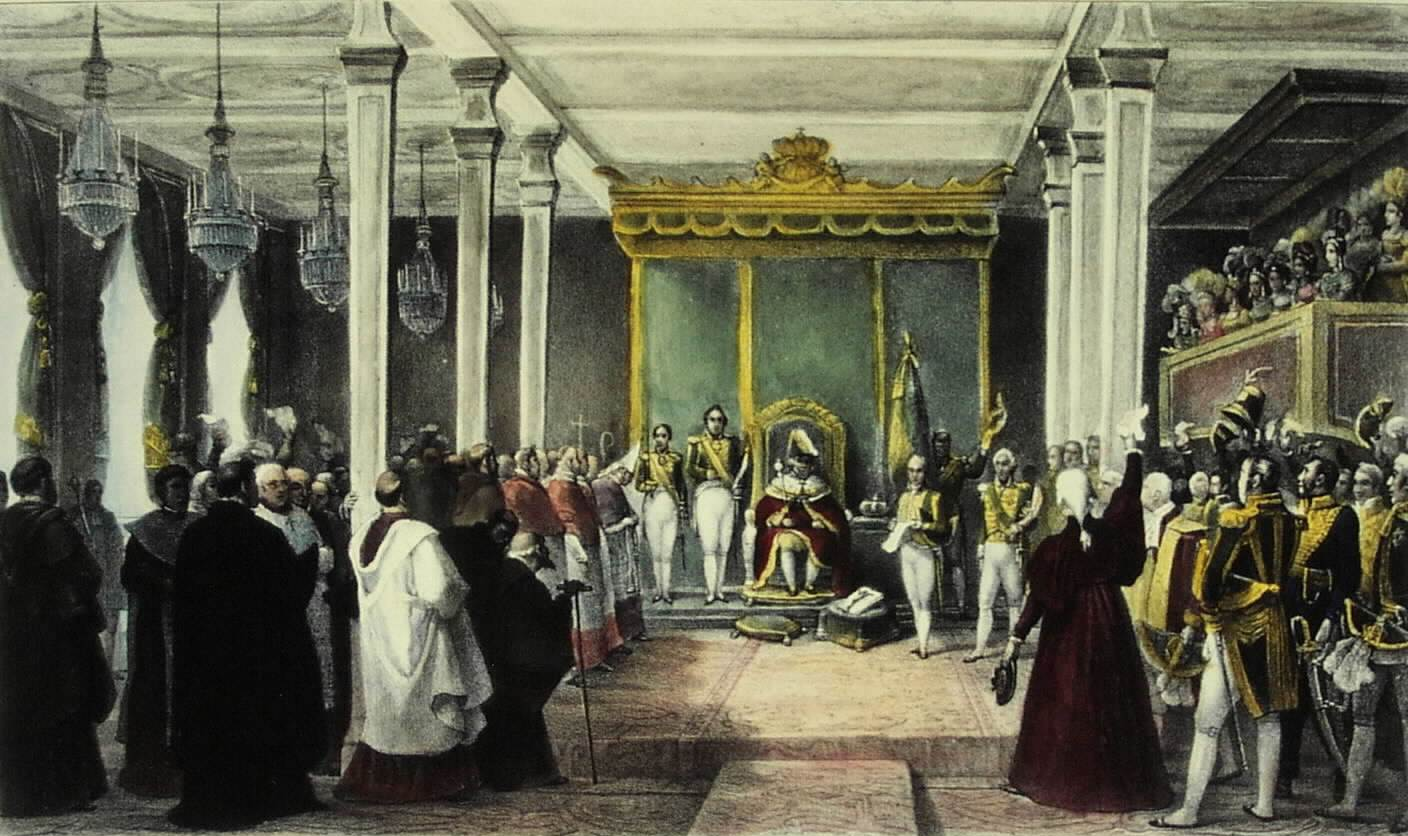
The acclamation ceremony of King John VI of the United Kingdom of Portugal, Brazil and the Algarves in Rio de Janeiro, Brazil on 6 February 1818

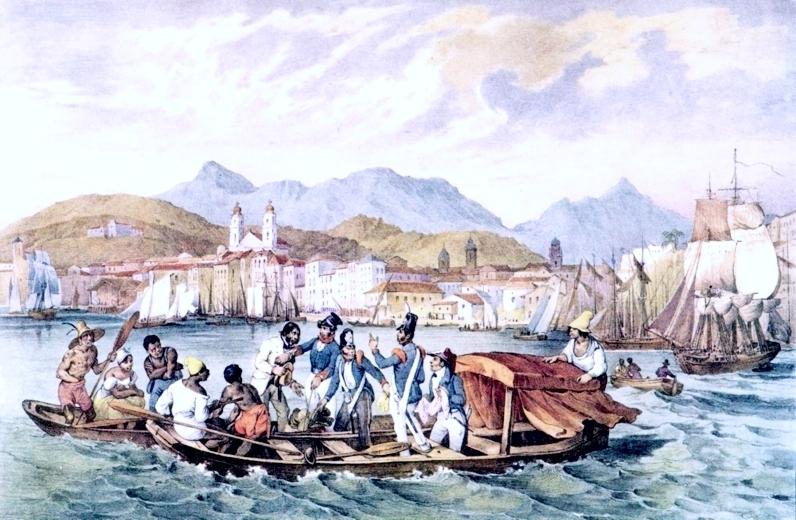
Port of the Mineiros in Rio de Janeiro

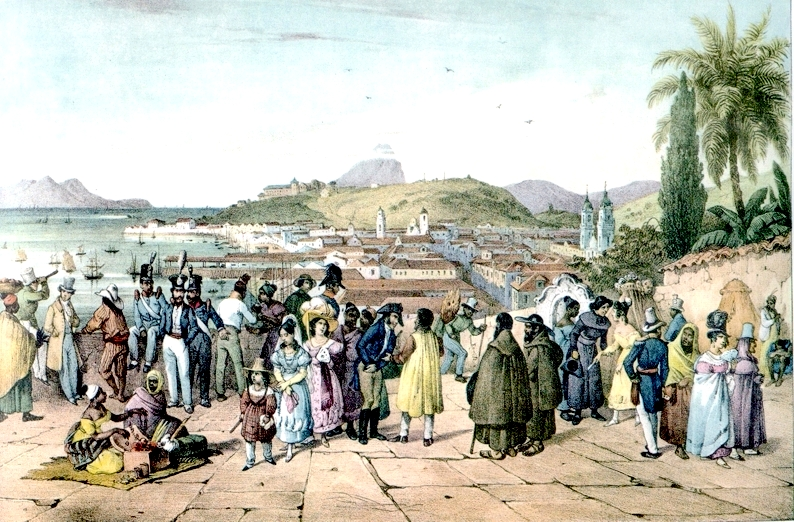
View of Rio de Janeiro from the church of the monastery of São Bento c. 1820

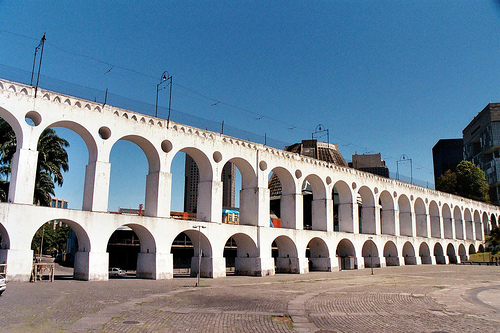
Carioca Aqueduct, built in the first half of the 18th century.

Guanabara Bay was reached by a Portuguese expedition under Florentine explorer Amerigo Vespucci, that included Portuguese explorer Gaspar de Lemos, on January 1, 1502; hence Rio de Janeiro, "January River." There is a legend that the mariners named the place thus because they thought the mouth of the bay was actually the mouth of a river, but no experienced sailor would make that mistake. At the time, river was the general word for any large body of water.

Several years after the Portuguese first explored Brazil, French traders in search of pau-brasil (a type of brazilwood) reached the rich area extending from the Cape Frio coast to the beaches and islands of Guanabara Bay, the economic and, above all, strategic importance of which was already well-known.

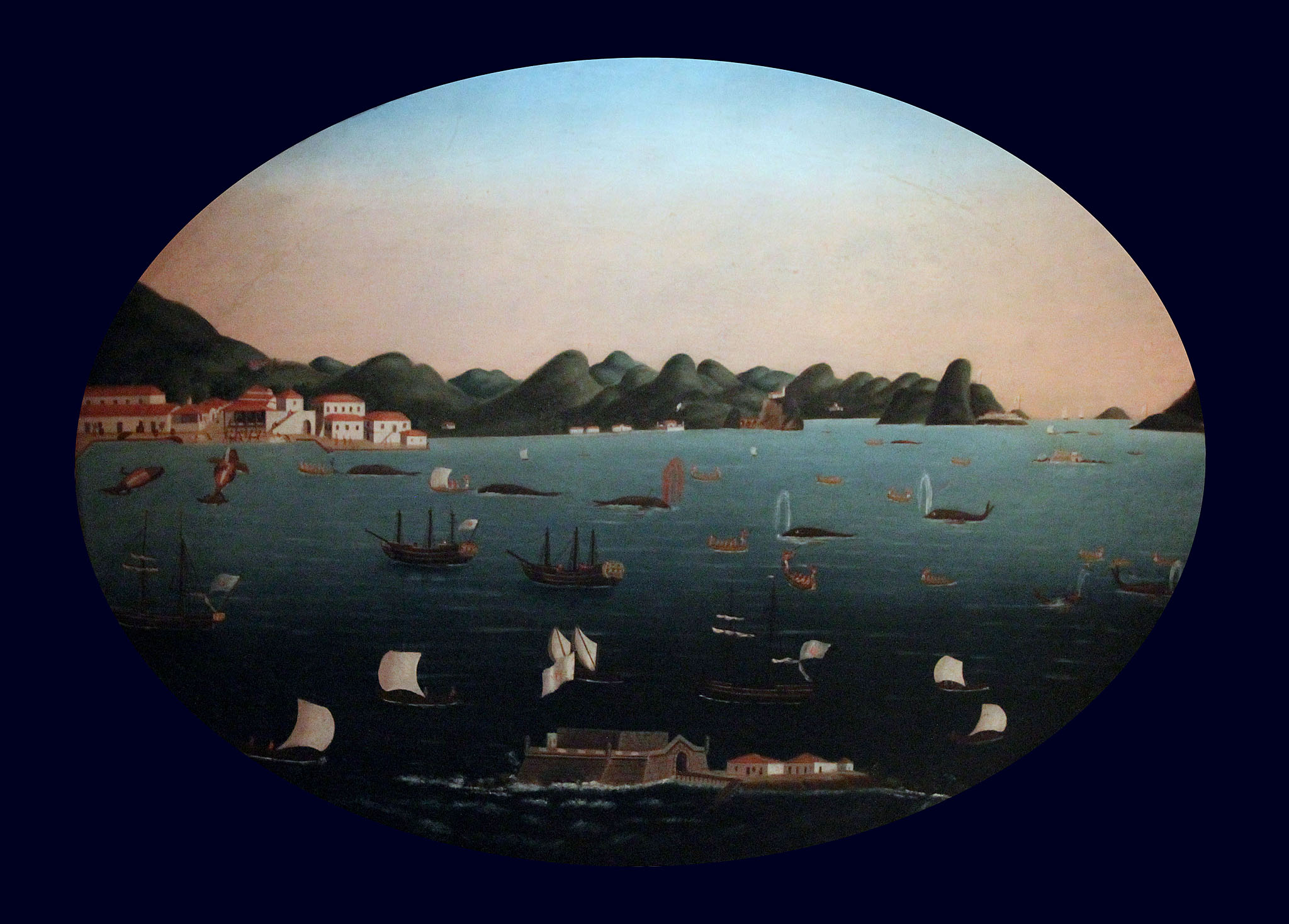
Whaling in Rio de Janeiro possibly in 18th century

In 1555, one of the islands of Guanabara Bay, now called Villegagnon Island, was occupied by 500 French colonists under admiral Nicolas Durand de Villegaignon. Consequently, Villegagnon built Fort Coligny on the island when attempting to establish the France Antarctique colony, which the French called Henriville in honor of Henry II of France.

On March 1, 1565 the city is founded. Until early in the 18th century, the city was threatened or invaded by several, mostly French pirates and buccaneers, such as Jean-François Duclerc and René Duguay-Trouin. After 1720, when the Portuguese found gold and diamonds in the neighboring captaincy of Minas Gerais, Rio de Janeiro became a much more useful port for exporting wealth than Salvador, Bahia, which is much farther to the north. In 1763, the colonial administration in Portuguese America was moved to Rio. The city remained primarily a colonial capital until 1808, when the Portuguese royal family and most of the associated Lisbon nobles, fleeing from Napoleon's invasion of Portugal, moved to Rio de Janeiro. The kingdom's capital was transferred to the city, which, thus, became the only European capital outside of Europe. As there was no physical space or urban structure to accommodate hundreds of noblemen who arrived suddenly, many inhabitants were simply evicted from their homes.

When Prince Pedro I proclaimed the independence of Brazil in 1822, he decided to keep Rio de Janeiro as the capital of his new empire. Rio continued as the capital of Brazil after 1889, when the monarchy was replaced by a republic.

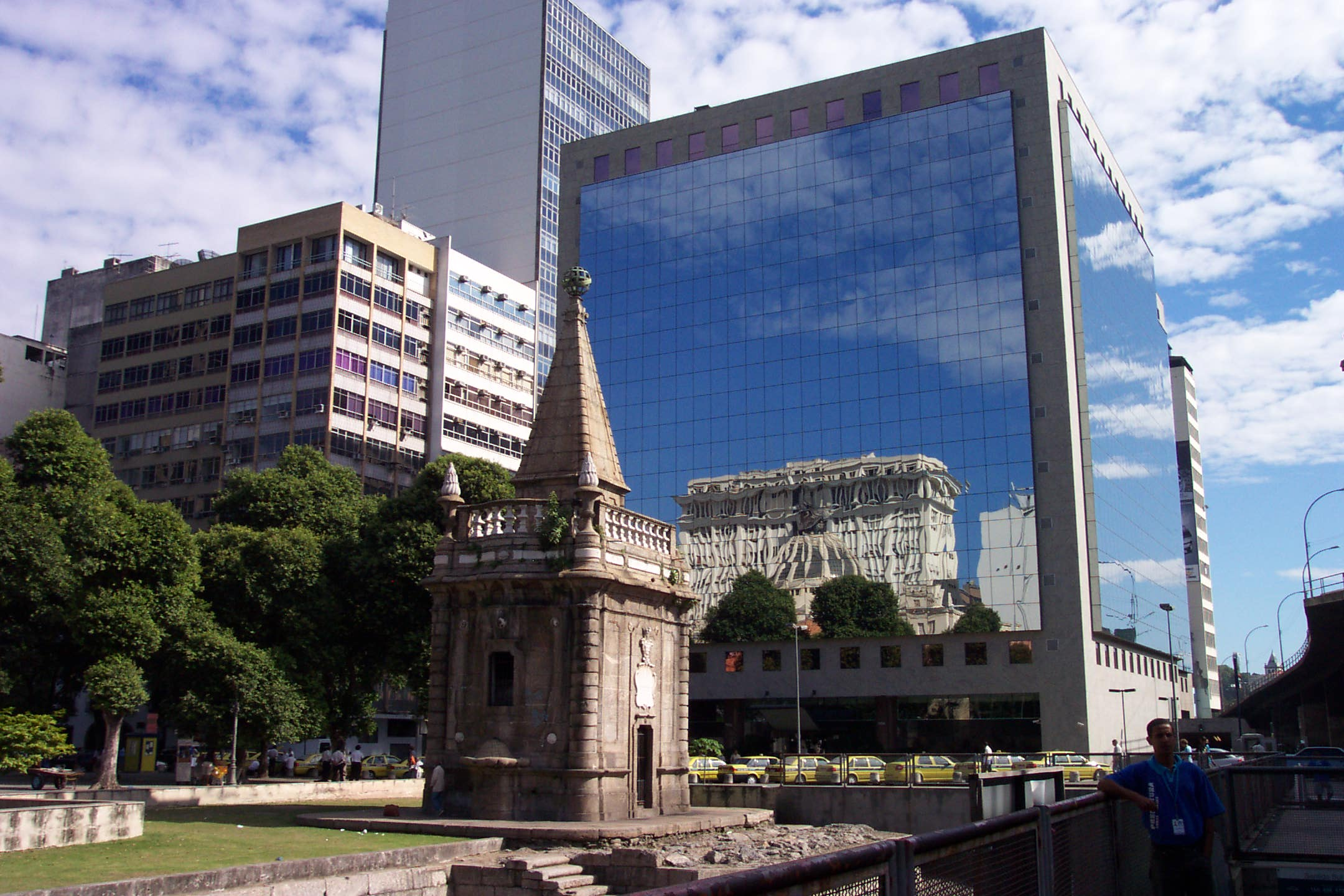
XV Square.

Until the early years of the 20th century, the city was largely limited to the neighborhood now known as the historic Downtown business district (see below), on the mouth of Guanabara Bay. The city's center of gravity began to shift south and west to the so-called Zona Sul (South Zone) in the early part of the 20th century, when the first tunnel was built under the mountains located between Botafogo and the neighborhood now known as Copacabana. That beach's natural beauty, combined with the fame of the Copacabana Palace Hotel, the luxury hotel of the Americas in the 1930s, helped Rio to gain the reputation it still holds today as a beach party town (though, this reputation has been somewhat tarnished in recent years by favela violence resulting from the narcotics trade). Plans for moving the nation's capital city to the territorial centre had been occasionally discussed, and when Juscelino Kubitschek was elected president in 1955, it was partially on the strength of promises to build a new capital. Though many thought that it was just campaign rhetoric, Kubitschek managed to have Brasília built, at great cost, by 1960. On April 21 that year the capital of Brazil was officially moved from Rio de Janeiro to Brasília.

Between 1960 and 1975 Rio was a capital city under the name State of Guanabara (after the bay it borders). However, for administrative and political reasons, a presidential decree known as "The Fusion" removed the city's federative status and merged it with the state of Rio de Janeiro in 1975. Even today, some Cariocas advocate the return of municipal autonomy.

== See also ==
- Timeline of Rio de Janeiro history
- History of the city of São Paulo
