= Project Morrinho =

Coordinates: 22°55′48″S 43°11′30″W

Typical street in the Morrinho model with vehicles and people

Project Morrinho (in Portuguese "Projeto Morrinho") is a social and cultural project based out of the Favelas Cariocas and the Favela (Pereirão) in the Laranjeiras neighborhood of Rio de Janeiro, Brazil. Morrinho, which was started by local youth in 1997, is a 450m² model of the city constructed from bricks and other recycled materials. It began as a simple childhood game to escape the realities of violence and corruption that surrounded the teens and their community.

Within this miniature urban world of Morrinho ("little hill"), participants act out a role-playing game with the numerous people made from Lego that inhabit the model, recreating life in Rio's favelas. Morrinho reproduces the favelas of Rio de Janeiro as a model. In addition to the Lego people, Morrinho includes cars, police vehicles, and a helicopter, representing the reality lived by these young people. Throughout the years, Morrinho has garnered increasing attention, growing from a local phenomenon to a popular international exhibit. It has been able to use that attention to evolve, not only as a work of art, but also, into an organization with aspirations for social change. Currently, more than 20 teenagers are following in the example of Morrinho's founding members.

== History ==
Two Lego figures armed with guns stand outside a building in the Morrinho model

Project Morrinho was created in 1997 by Cirlan Souza de Oliveira, a 14-year-old boy who had recently moved to Rio de Janeiro. Oliveira was impressed with the architecture and style of life in the city's favelas and he decided to playfully reproduce this reality in his own backyard with bricks and paint left over from his father's work in construction. This diversion caught the attention of seven other local youths, and what began as a game became a hobby.

In 2001, on a visit to the community, film directors Fábio Gavião, Marco Oliveira, and Francisco Franca invited the boys to participate in their work of image captivation. This partnership became a non-governmental organisation composed of four components: tourism at Morrinho, TV Morrinho, Expo Morrinho and Morrinho Social. In 2008, after seven years of chronicling the history of Morrinho and the lives of its creators, filmmakers Fábio Gavião and Markão Oliveira released a full-length documentary titled Morrinho: God Knows Everything But Is No Snitch.

Curators and critics have recognized the unique character and innovation of the Morrinho model as a legitimate expression of contemporary art, and has drawn considerable international attention from journalists, architects, musicians, scholars, and tourists. Smaller scale replicas of the Morrinho model have been exhibited throughout Brazil and Europe, including the 2004 Urban World Forum in Barcelona, the 2005 Point Ephémère in Paris and the 2007 Venice Biennale. In Venice, on the occasion of the Biennale Visual Art Exhibition, the project was selected by the Director, Robert Storr, and Morrinho Project was also performed, in a radio-dramatic version, for a promotional radio format in collaboration with Radio Sherwood (Marghera, Venice), called Radio Morrinho (with interviews and live interventions).

== Components ==
Morrinho has four components: Tourism at Morrinho, TV Morrinho, Expo Morrinho, and Morrinho Social. Each is important to shaping the project as a whole.

=== Morrinho Tourism ===
Morrinho is open to the public and encourages travelers and locals to visit the project. This facilitates an exchange of ideas and allows a better understanding of the project and its meaning to the community.

=== Television Morrinho ===
TV Morrinho serves as a center for original independent and contracted video productions that derive from the model. TV Morrinho is a performance-based exhibition that began after the success of the 2007 Venice Biennal. The work debuted at the Wiener Festwochen (Vienna International Theater Festival) in 2008, and recently won a grant from the Ministry of Culture of Brazil. With TV Morrinho Live, the group builds a miniature favela, a replica of the Rio original. For the performances, they develop a scripted role-playing drama involving the LEGO-figurine 'inhabitants' of the favela. The story is then played out and projected live via three video cameras onto a large screen for the audience to follow. The exhibition also features a music performance by MC Maiquinho, one of the Morrinho youth who has become a renowned funk singer.

In addition to productions created specifically for exhibitions around the world, TV Morrinho has produced numerous independent videos based on stories that have been developed in Morrinho.

TV Morrinho Institutional	TV Morrinho Independent
Institutional films; Commercial firms (publicity campaigns); General record of events	Music vídeos set in the Morrinho model; Children's series for the television channel Nickelodeon; Independent short films, médium length films, and full-length features; Movie experience

TV Morrinho has also been contracted by clients such as British Gas Brazil, Casa França-Brasil, the Brazilian Ministry of Health, BHP Billiton, Junior Achievement and Nickelodeon Brazil.

TV Morrinho has also won the prize for Best Video at Visions of the Periphery Audiovisual Festival.

=== Morrinho Exhibition ===
Project Morrinho has been recognized domestically, as well as internationally at various exhibitions and festivals. At these events, a small scale model was built by the members of Morrinho to display to spectators. The following is a list of exhibitions:

Month & Year	Exhibition	Location				
Nov – Dec 2002	Vitrine da loja RupeeRupee no Rio Design da Barra. Natal da Conscientização	Rio de Janeiro, Brazil				
May – June 2003	Parque das Ruínas	Rio de Janeiro, Brazil				
Sept – Nov 2003	Morrinho Pereirão	Rio de Janeiro, Brazil				
November 2003	Morrinho de Lazer, residential condominium	Maricá, Brazil				
November 2003	Morrinho no Show do Rappa	Brazil				
April 2004	Mostra Sociedade Viva (Ministry of Health Care)	Natal, Brazil				
August 2004	Mostra Sociedade Viva (Ministry of Health Care)	Recife, Brazil				
September 2004	Mostra Sociedade Viva (Ministry of Health Care)	Campo Grande, Brazil				
September 2004	Domingão do Faustão	Brazil				
September 2004	II Fórum Mundial Urbano	Barcelona, Spain				
October 2004	Circo Voador	Brazil				
October 2004	Mostra Sociedade Viva (Ministry of Health Care)	Campo Grande, Brazil				
October 2004	Mostra Tangolomango	Castelinho do Flamengo, Brazil				
November 2004	Coleção de Verão Filhas da Mãe Joanna	Rio de Janeiro, Brazil				
December 2005	Point Ephémère	Paris, France				
June – Aug 2006	Haus der Kunst	Munich, Germany				
October 2006	27th São Paulo Biennial: Retratos da vida na favela". by Paula Trope	Sao Paulo, Brazil				
June 2007	52nd Venice Biennale	Venice, Italy				
December 2007	Mostra SESC de Artes	São Paulo, Brazil				
May 2008	Brut im Künstlerhaus	Vienna, Austria				
May 2008	Hebbel am Ufer – Hau Zwei	Berlin, Germany				
November 2008	Swarovski Kristalwelten	Innsbruck, Austria				
November 2008	SESC Art Show Exposition	Sao Paulo, Brazil				
December 2008	Umbria Jazz Festival	Perugia, Italy				
April 2009	Conference for Tourism and Social Responsibility at the Universidade Veiga da Almeida	Rio de Janeiro, Brazil				
May 2009	Latin American Film Festival	Netherlands				
May 2009	University of Wisconsin and Easy Going Agency	Madison, Wisconsin				
July 2009	Fourth Annual Tourism Congress	Sao Paulo, Brazil				
July 2009	The Museum of Modern Art (MoMA)	New York City				
July 2009	Cultural exchange with "Video Nas Aldeias"	Pereira da Silva, Rio de Janeiro, Brazil	November 2010 Contemporary Art Festival in Oslo Capital of Norway Event held over two weeks with a small-scale exhibition of the Morrinho Project	July - September 2010	Festival Brazil at Southbank Centre	London, England
February 2010	Screening at University of Miami	Miami, Florida				
March 2010	Screening at Georgetown University	Washington, DC				
September 2012	Screening and Panel Discussion at Graduate Center CUNY	New York, NY				
March 2013 - 2015	Installation at Museu de Arte do Rio	Rio de Janeiro, Brazil				
September 2013	Permanent Exhibit at Queens College	New York, NY				
July–September 2016	Installation at the Horniman Museum's Festival of Brasil	London, England				

(March 2017. In process) !!!!

Traveling exhibitions 3 states of Brazil (São Paulo: from 10 to 22 March) (Brasilia: 03/03 to 04/04) (Manaus: from 04/13 to 04/26) (Partners): Itaú Cultural / Rumos / Producer Numen @MorrinhoProject Artistic Name of the Process: Micror Residências Project Morrinho 2017

post_facebook.jpg

=== Morrinho Social ===
Morrinho Social, the fourth component, was still being developed as of August 2009. Following the slogan "Initiating a Small Revolution", Morrinho Social intends to offer profession qualification workshops to the residents of the Pereirão community. The idea has been developed over the past two years and aims to odder an education al component that complements the overarching values of Morrinho of social justice and economic mobility.

Through informal means Morrinho Social will develop the area of education and professionalism under the following courses:

- Audiovisual
- Art Education
- Youth Leadership
- Youth and Citizenship

== Goals ==
Morrinho aims to bring positive change to the local community, as well as challenge the popular perception of Brazil's favelas. Through its work, Morrinho contributes directly to the socio-cultural and economic development of the surrounding areas. The belief that favelas are merely dominated by drug trafficking and violence is not all encompassing. Morrinho communicates the realities of life through film, plastic arts, theater and music and shows that life in the favela is multi-dimensional.
