= Edificio Avenida Central =

Office skyscraper in Rio de Janeiro, Brazil

Coordinates: 22.9070°S 43.1774°W

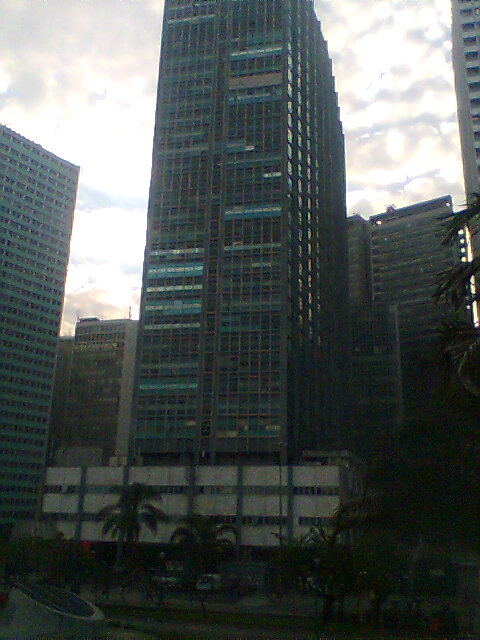
- (2008)
- Interactive map of the Edificio Avenida Central area

General information
- Status: Completed
- Type: Office
- Construction started: 1959
- Completed: 1961

Height
- Height: 110 m

Technical details
- Floor count: 34
- Lifts/elevators: 18

Design and construction
- Architect: Henrique Mindlin

Edificio Avenida Central is an office skyscraper located on Avenida Rio Branco in the Centro neighbourhood of Rio de Janeiro, Brazil. It stands at a height of 110 metres and has 34 floors. It was completed in 1961 in the International style of architecture, which was the dominant architectural style at the time of the building's construction.
