= USS LST-172 =

1943 LST-1-class tank landing ship

History

United States
- Name: USS LST-172
- Builder: Missouri Valley Bridge and Iron Co.; Evansville, Indiana
- Laid down: 24 December 1942
- Launched: 12 May 1943
- Commissioned: 11 June 1943
- Decommissioned: 8 June 1946
- Fate: Sold 5 November 1947

General characteristics
- Class & type: LST-2-class tank landing ship

LST-172 was an American World War II Landing Ship, Tank.

== History ==
On 23 April 1946, while LST-172 was in the Yangtze River near Shanghai, China, a teenaged Seaman 2d Class, William Vincent Smith, of Asheville, North Carolina, described as a silent, introspective individual, went berserk at 0300 hrs. and shot to death nine of the 30 shipmates in the berthing space before stabbing himself. Smith was only two months out of the United States at the time of his attack.

One of his mortally wounded victims managed to disarm him of the carbine and pistol he used, firing 20 rounds in all, whereupon Smith stabbed himself three times in the abdomen. He, and one of his victims, Seaman 2d Class George E. Simpson, 18, were taken to the hospital ship USS Repose, where Smith was initially given a 50/50 chance of surviving. Simpson, of Waterbury, Connecticut, was struck on the left side of his chest by one of the rounds fired by Smith.

=== Investigation ===
Rear Admiral Bertram J. Rodgers, commander of the Seventh Fleet amphibious forces, ordered an immediate court of inquiry and made a flying trip to the LST for a personal investigation.

"The Navy said that Smith had stood a two-hour watch just before midnight and sometime in the quiet hours before 3 a.m., obtained a carbine from the cabin of the gunnery officer, who was on watch. Then with the carbine and a 22-caliber pistol which he had concealed among his effects, he went to the compartment, switched on the lights, and opened up. He fired until the magazines of both carbine and pistol were emptied, then leaped among the seaman with a flashing knife."

The names of the victims were withheld pending notification of next of kin.

The dead were buried in the U.S. Military Plot of the Shanghai Cemetery.

=== Suicide ends case ===
While awaiting court martial for the slayings of his fellow crew members, Smith, was found hanged in his cell at the Anacostia Naval Receiving Station, Washington, D.C., on 1 August 1947. He was being held in solitary confinement pending trial on 19 August, officers said.
