= 1958 Rio de Janeiro train crash =

Railway incident in Brazil

Coordinates: 22°54′17″S 43°14′28″W

Details
- Date: May 8, 1958
- Location: Mangueira, Rio de Janeiro
- Country: Brazil
- Operator: Estrada de Ferro Central do Brasil
- Incident type: Head-on collision
- Cause: Signalling error

Statistics
- Trains: 2
- Deaths: 128
- Injured: up to 300

The 1958 Rio de Janeiro train crash, occurred on May 8, 1958, in Mangueira, a suburb two miles west of Rio de Janeiro city centre in Brazil when two electric trains collided head on, killing 128 people and injuring more than 300. It is the most serious rail accident in the history of the city. As of 2023, it remains the Second-Deadliest rail accident in brazilian railway history, being surpassed by the Aracaju train crash.

A signalling error had routed an outgoing commuter train onto the same track as an incoming local. The collision resulted in a 'horrible mass of twisted steel and mangled bodies' as the two trains telescoped together. The wreckage of the carriages was left piled along embankments under a highway overpass. The following day angry residents and relatives of the dead invaded and wrecked both Mangueira station and the busy Engenho de Dentro station. Crowds also stormed three other nearby stations but were repelled by police. The president of Brazil, Dr. Juscelino Kubitschek, angered by reports that the disaster was caused by 'negligence', dismissed three officials of the Estrada de Ferro Central do Brasil (Central Railway of Brazil).

== Sources ==
- Railroad Wrecks by Edgar A. Haine, publ 1993, page 147, ISBN 0-8453-4844-2
