= 2007 Rio de Janeiro train collision =

Railway accident in Rio de Janeiro, Brazil

The Rio de Janeiro train collision occurred on August 30, 2007, when two trains collided in the Nova Iguaçu suburb of Rio de Janeiro, Brazil. Eleven people were killed.

The accident happened at 16:09 at a junction near Austin station in Nova Iguaçu in the region of Baixada Fluminense on the outskirts of Rio de Janeiro. A passenger train traveling at approximately 60 mph carrying 850 people collided with the back of an empty 6 car passenger train that was merging in between two parallel tracks killing 8 people and injuring 111, 15 seriously.

The trains were so badly damaged in the collision, that rescue workers were forced to use blowtorches to cut through the mangled metal to reach the passengers. The occupied train was operated by the company Supervia.

== See also ==
- Train wreck
