= Aracaju train crash =

1946 train wreck in Brazil

Coordinates: 10°48′46″S 37°09′50″W

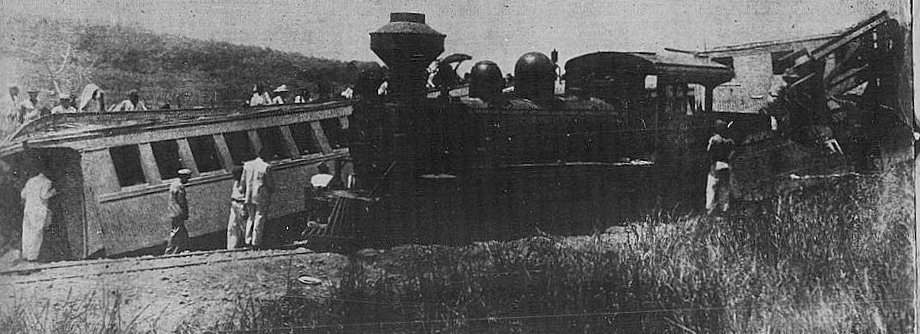

Details
- Date: March 20, 1946
- Location: Aracaju
- Country: Brazil
- Operator: VFF Leste Brasileiro
- Incident type: Derailment
- Cause: Brake Failure caused by worn-out brakes

Statistics
- Trains: 1
- Passengers: 1000
- Deaths: 185
- Injured: 300

The Aracaju train crash, which occurred on March 20, 1946, is the worst ever rail disaster in Brazil; resulting in the deaths of 185 people and 300 injured. The accident happened near Aracaju, capital of the coastal state of Sergipe, 800 miles (1,287 km) northeast of Rio de Janeiro.

The train concerned was a suburban service operating between Aracaju and Capela, Sergipe, and carrying about one thousand passengers. The locomotive, baggage car and three passenger cars were derailed whilst descending a steep incline near Aracaju, most of the dead being "smashed within the cars", "Many bodies were mutilated so badly that identification was impossible".

Grief-stricken relatives came to the scene and nearly lynched the surviving locomotive engineer who, depending on the source, either took refuge in a police station or fled the area later to surrender in the town of Laranjeiras, Sergipe. The train conductors also fled.
