= Hotel Rodina =

Skyscraper hotel in Sofia, Bulgaria

- Хотел Родина
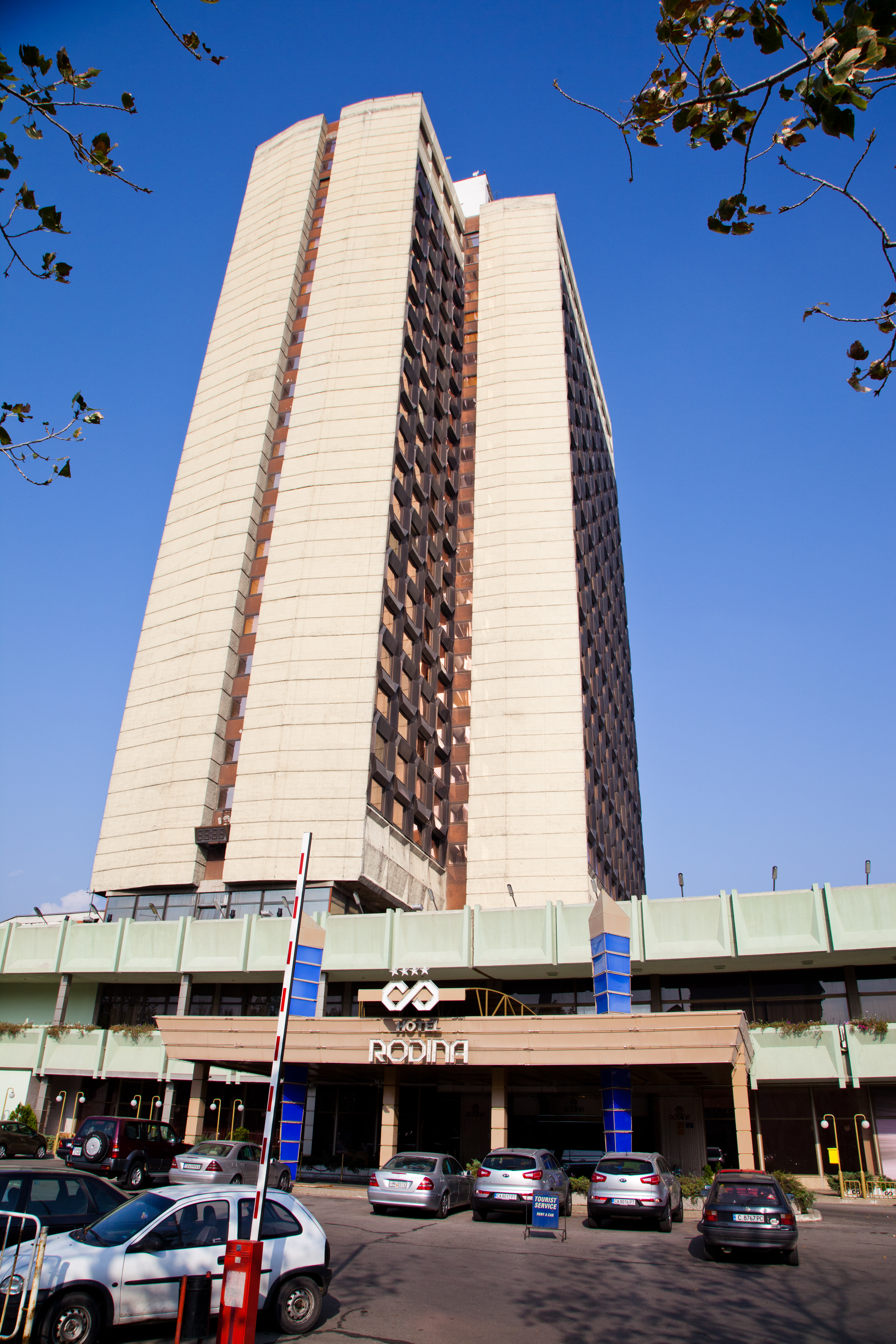
- Hotel Rodina in October 2012
- Interactive map of the Hotel Rodina area

General information
- Status: Completed
- Type: Hotel
- Location: Sofia, Bulgaria
- Coordinates: 42°41′32″N 23°18′31″E
- Completed: 1979

Height
- Roof: 104 m (341 ft)

Technical details
- Floor count: 25

The Hotel Rodina, now known as the Astoria Hotel & Casino, is a four-star skyscraper hotel located in the center of Sofia, Bulgaria. Standing at a height of 104 m (341 ft) with 25 floors, it is one of the tallest buildings in the city and features 500 rooms, 6 luxury apartments, and 9 conference rooms.

== History ==
The hotel was completed in 1979. The building is 104 m (341 ft) tall. Upon its completion, it was the first building in Bulgaria to surpass 100 m (328 ft) and became the country's first modern skyscraper. It held the title of the tallest building in Bulgaria for 36 years until 2015, when Capital Fort surpassed it. Between 2013 and 2014, several auctions were held for its sale, with the asking price decreasing each time due to low market interest. In the fourth consecutive public sale procedure organized by private bailiff Georgi Dichev over unpaid debts to UBB, the hotel was purchased by Ludmil Stoykov. A major reconstruction began in 2017, and the skyscraper reopened in 2022 as the four-star Astoria Hotel and Casino.

== See also ==
- List of tallest buildings in Sofia
- List of tallest buildings in Bulgaria
