= Millennium Center (Sofia) =

Building in Sofia, Bulgaria

Millenium Center
- Милениум Център
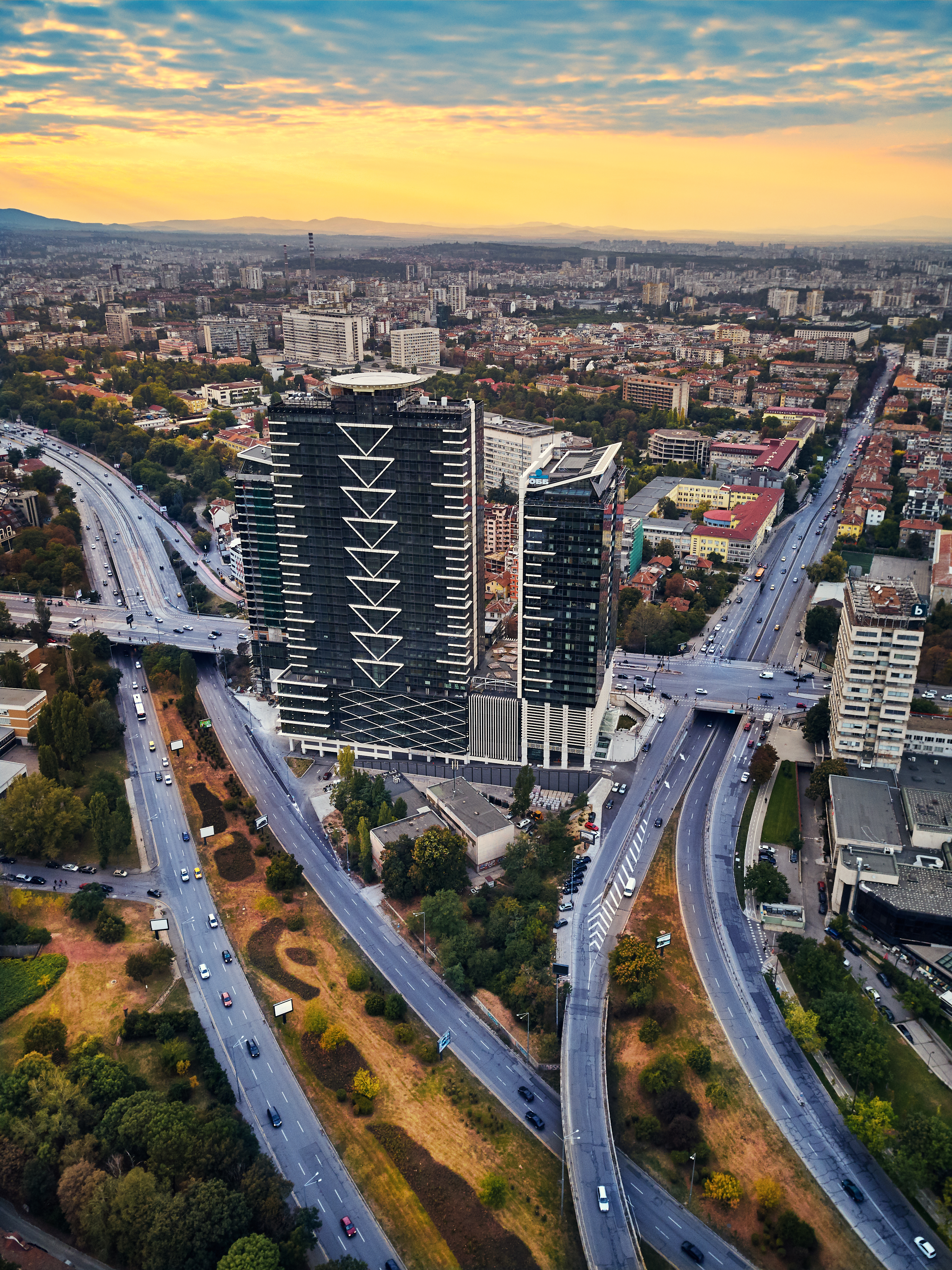
- A view of Bulgaria and Pencho Slaveykov Boulevards with Millennium Center in the Foreground
- Interactive map of the Millenium Center area

General information
- Status: Completed
- Type: Commercial, Residential
- Location: Vitosha Blvd 89B; Sofia, Bulgaria
- Coordinates: 42°40′56″N 23°18′53″E
- Construction started: 2010
- Opening: 2017

Height
- Top floor: 118 m (387 ft)

Technical details
- Floor count: 32
- Floor area: 135,000 m^{2} (1,453,100 sq ft)

Other information
- Public transit access: Tram lines: 1, 7, 12, 27 Bus lines: 72

Website
- www.ghms.bg

Millennium Center is an office, hotel and residential building in Sofia. As of March 2020, it is the second tallest building in the city and Bulgaria, after the Capital Fort building, but with its 32 floors it is the highest by floor count in the country.

== See also ==
- List of tallest buildings in Sofia
- List of tallest buildings in Bulgaria
- List of tallest structures in Bulgaria
- List of tallest buildings in Europe
