= Interhotel Cherno More =

Skyscraper hotel in Varna, Bulgaria

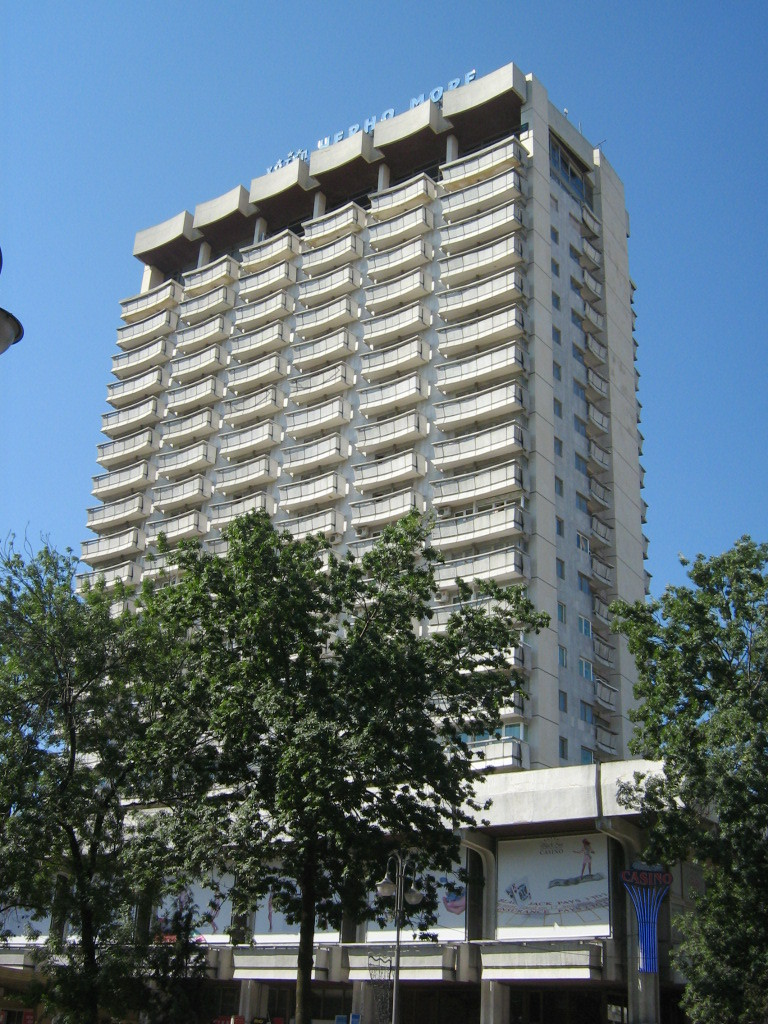

- Location within Bulgaria

General information
- Location: Varna, Bulgaria, 33 Slivnitsa Blvd., 9000
- Coordinates: 43.2048973°N 27.920619°E
- Opening: 1978

Height
- Height: 72.2

Technical details
- Floor count: 22

Other information
- Number of rooms: 173

Website
- www.chernomorebg.com/home

Interhotel Cherno More is a 4-star hotel, and at 72.2 meters, the tallest building in the Bulgarian port city of Varna. It is also the 25th tallest building in Bulgaria.

The hotel is located near the Sea Garden, the largest landscaped park in the Balkans.

== See also ==
- List of tallest buildings in Bulgaria
