= National Diet Building =

Seat of the National Diet of Japan

- 国会議事堂
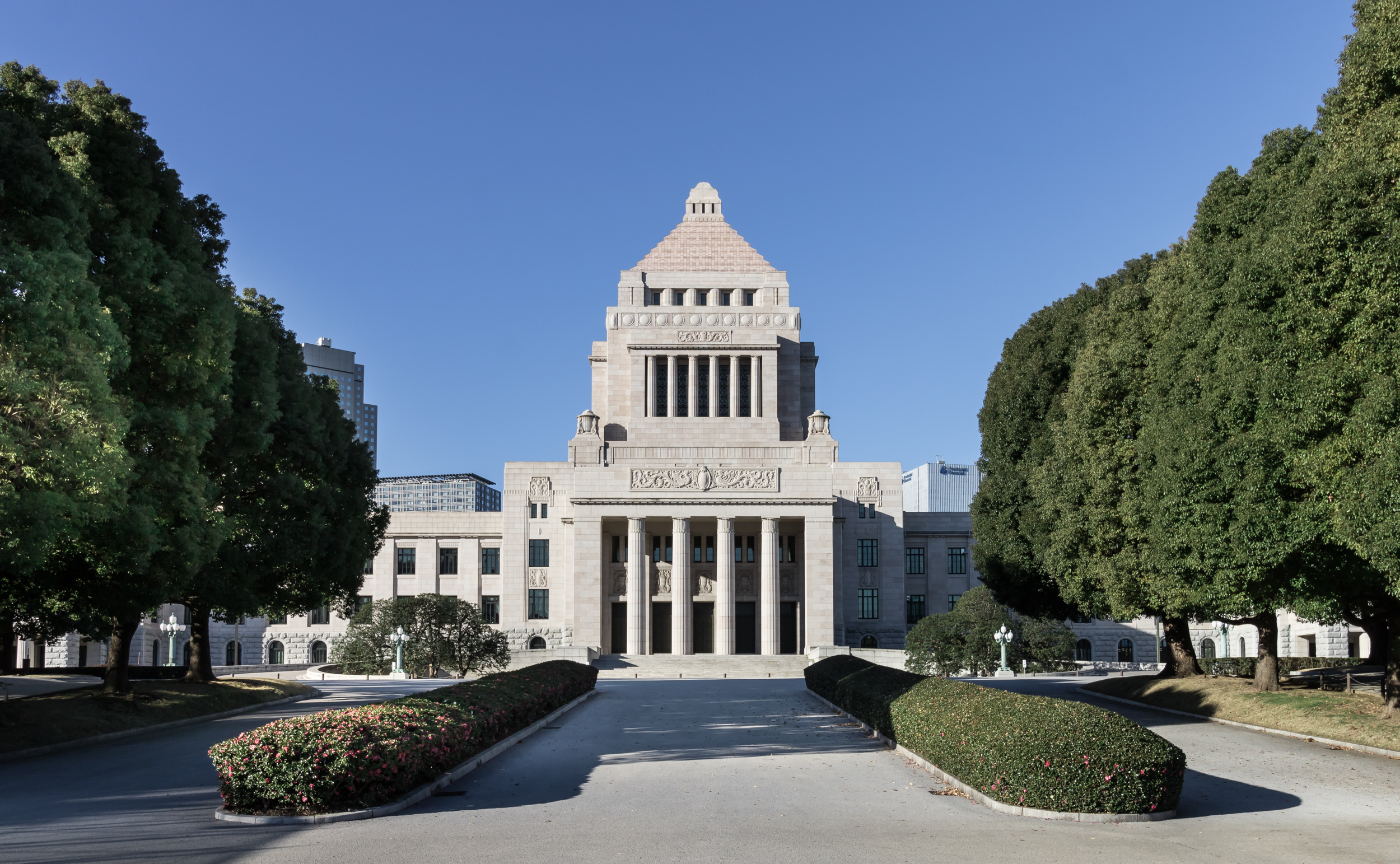
- Front view of the building in 2019
- Alternative names: Imperial Parliament Building

Record height
- Tallest in Japan from 1936 to 1964^{[I]}
- Preceded by: Five-storied pagoda in Tō-ji, Kyoto
- Surpassed by: Hotel New Otani Tokyo

General information
- Architectural style: Art Deco
- Location: Nagatachō, Chiyoda, Tokyo, Japan
- Coordinates: 35°40′33″N 139°44′41″E
- Construction started: 1920
- Completed: 7 November 1936; 89 years ago
- Owner: Government of Japan
- Governing body: National Diet of Japan

Height
- Height: 65.45 m (214.7 ft)

Technical details
- Floor count: 9
- Floor area: 53,464 m^{2} (575,480 sq ft)

Design and construction
- Architect: Ministry of Finance

Other information
- Public transit: Kokkai-gijidō-mae Station; Nagatachō Station

The National Diet Building (国会議事堂, Kokkai-gijidō) is the building where both houses of the National Diet of Japan meet. It is located at Nagatachō, Chiyoda, Tokyo.

Sessions of the House of Representatives take place in the south wing and sessions of the House of Councillors in the north wing.

The Diet Building was completed in 1936 and is constructed entirely of Japanese materials, with the exception of the stained glass, door locks, and pneumatic tube system.

== History ==
The construction of the building for the old Diet of Japan began in 1920; however, plans for the building date back to the late 1880s. The Diet met in temporary structures for the first fifty years of its existence because there was no agreement over what form its building should take.

=== Early designs ===
German architects Wilhelm Böckmann and Hermann Ende were invited to Tokyo in 1886 and 1887, respectively. They created two plans for a Diet building. Böckmann's initial plan was a masonry structure with a dome and flanking wings, similar to other legislatures of the era, which would form the core of a large "government ring" south of the Tokyo Imperial Palace. However, at the time there was public resistance in Japan to Foreign Minister Inoue Kaoru's internationalist policies, and so the architects submitted a more "Japanese" design as well, substituting traditional Japanese architectural features for many parts of the building. Ende and Böckmann's Diet Building was never built, but their other "government ring" designs were used for the Tokyo District Court and Ministry of Justice buildings.

In 1898, Prime Minister Itō Hirobumi interviewed American Ralph Adams Cram, who proposed a more "Oriental" design for the building, featuring tiled roofs and a large enclosure of walls and gates. The Itō government fell as Cram was en route to the United States, and the project was dropped.

=== First building, second building, and fires at both ===
With an internal deadline approaching, the government enlisted Ende and Böckmann associate Adolph Stegmueller and Japanese architect Yoshii Shigenori to design a temporary structure. The building, a two-story, European-style wooden structure, opened in November 1890 on a site in Hibiya.

An electrical fire burned down the first building in January 1891, only two months later. Another Ende and Böckmann associate, Oscar Tietze, joined Yoshii to design its replacement. The second building was larger than the first, but followed a similar design: it housed the Diet until 1925 when another fire destroyed the building.

First and Second Building

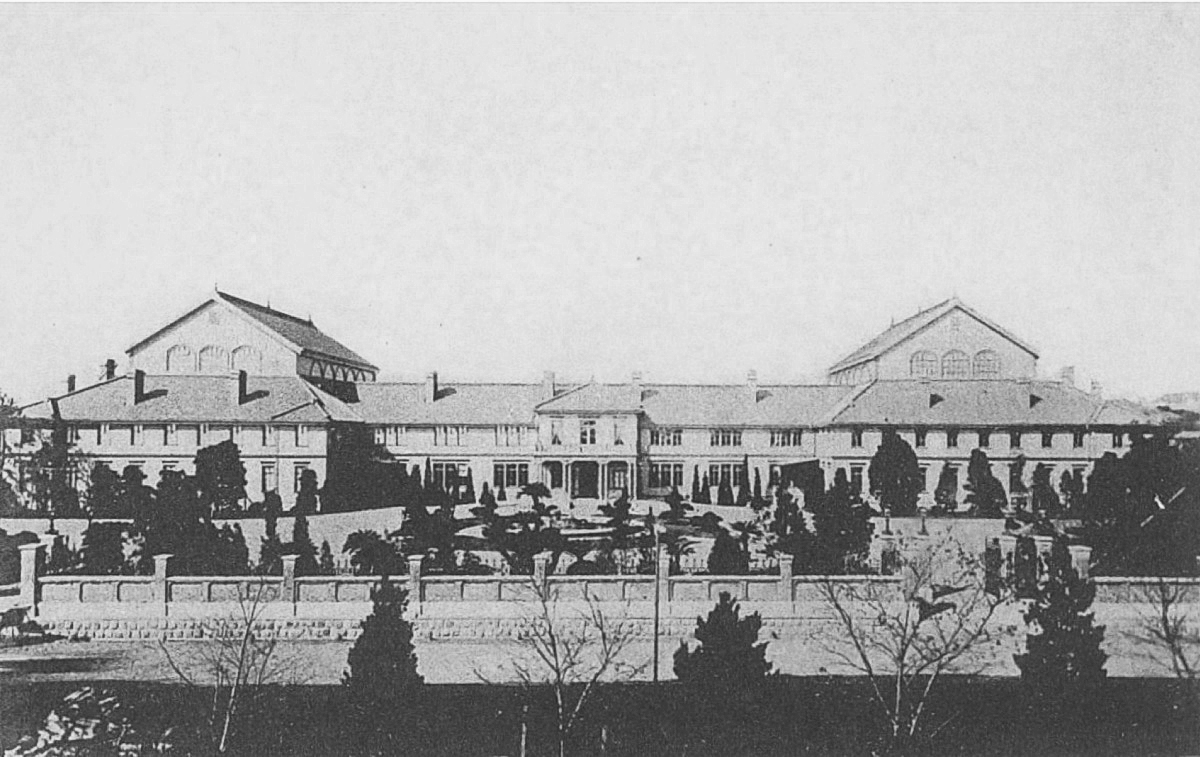
First building

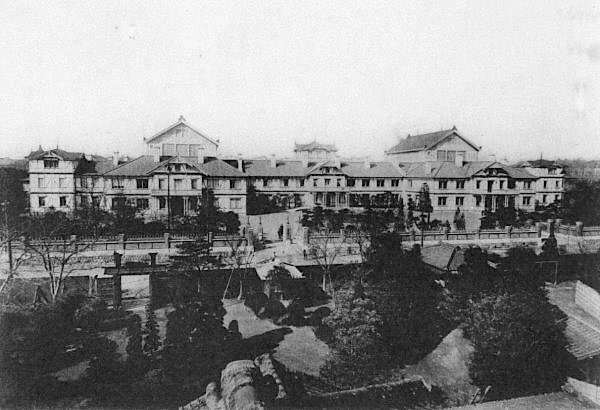
Second building

=== Current Diet building ===
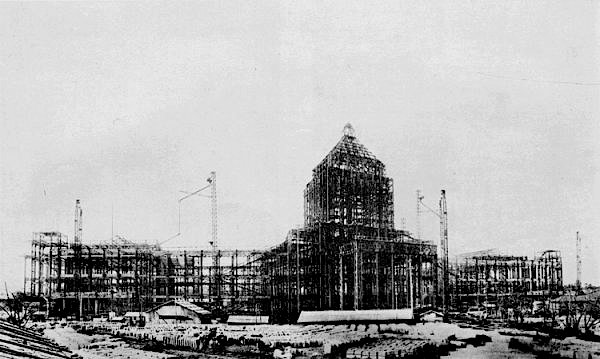
Construction

In 1910, the Finance Ministry started a commission in an attempt to take control over the new Diet Building design from the Home Ministry. Prime Minister Katsura Tarō (桂 太郎) chaired the commission, which recommended that the new building emulate an Italian Renaissance architectural style. This recommendation was criticized by many who thought that choice to be too arbitrary.

The ministry sponsored a public design competition in 1918, and 118 designs were submitted for the new building. The first prize winner, Watanabe Fukuzo (渡辺 福三), produced a design similar to Ende and Böckmann's.

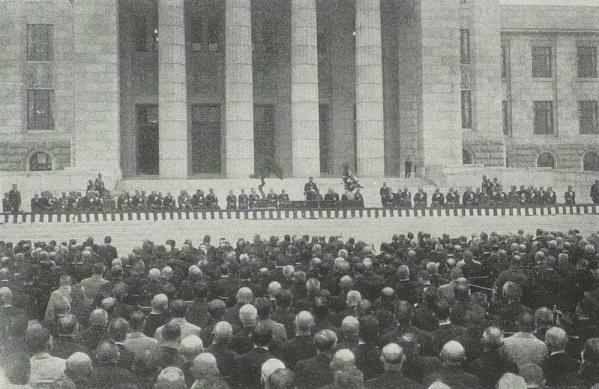
Opening ceremony

The Diet Building was eventually constructed between 1920 and 1936 with a floor plan based on Watanabe's entry.

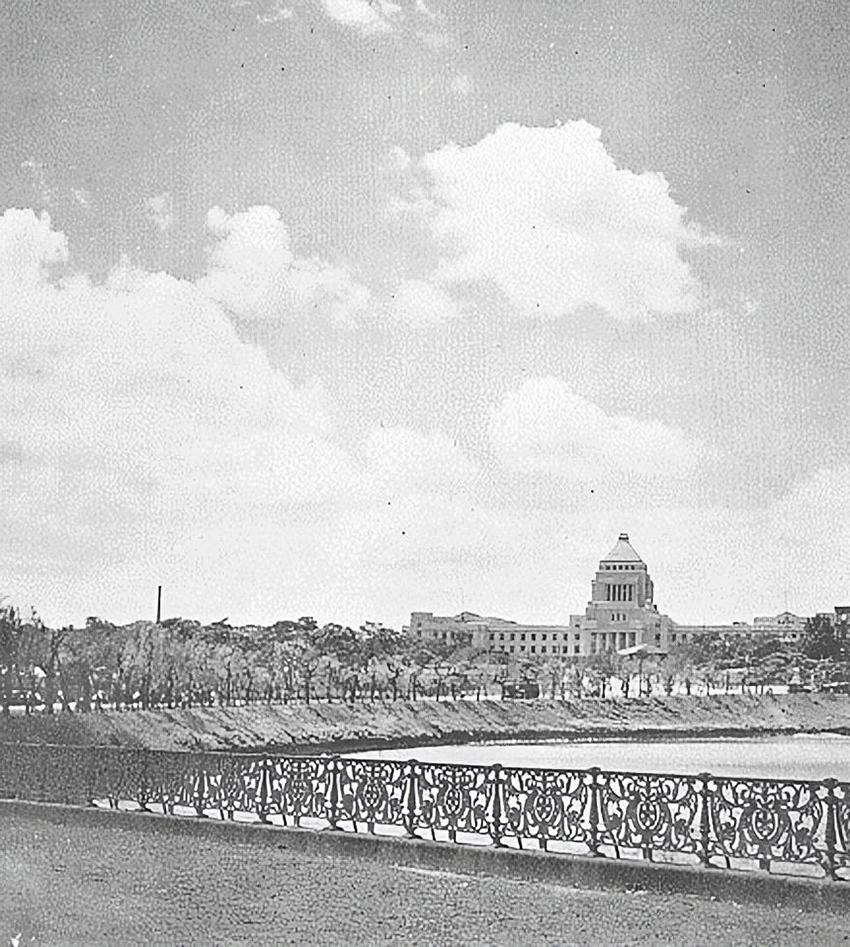
National Diet Building in the 1930s

The roof and tower of the building might have been inspired by another entrant, third prize winner Takeuchi Shinshichi, and are believed to have been chosen because they reflected a more modern hybrid architecture than the purely European and East Asian designs proposed by other architects. While the actual source for the "Pyramid" roof remains unclear, Japanese historian Jonathan Reynolds suggests it was "probably borrowed" from Takeuchi although an image of the entry is not provided but instead he thanks fellow historian of Africa studies at Columbia, Zoe Strother, for mentioning that Takeuchi's design resembles the Mausoleum at Halicarnassus, which was a model for some prominent Western designs in the early 20th century, such as John Russell Pope's 1911 award-winning House of the Temple in Washington, D.C., and the downtown Los Angeles City Hall, completed in 1928.

Current Building

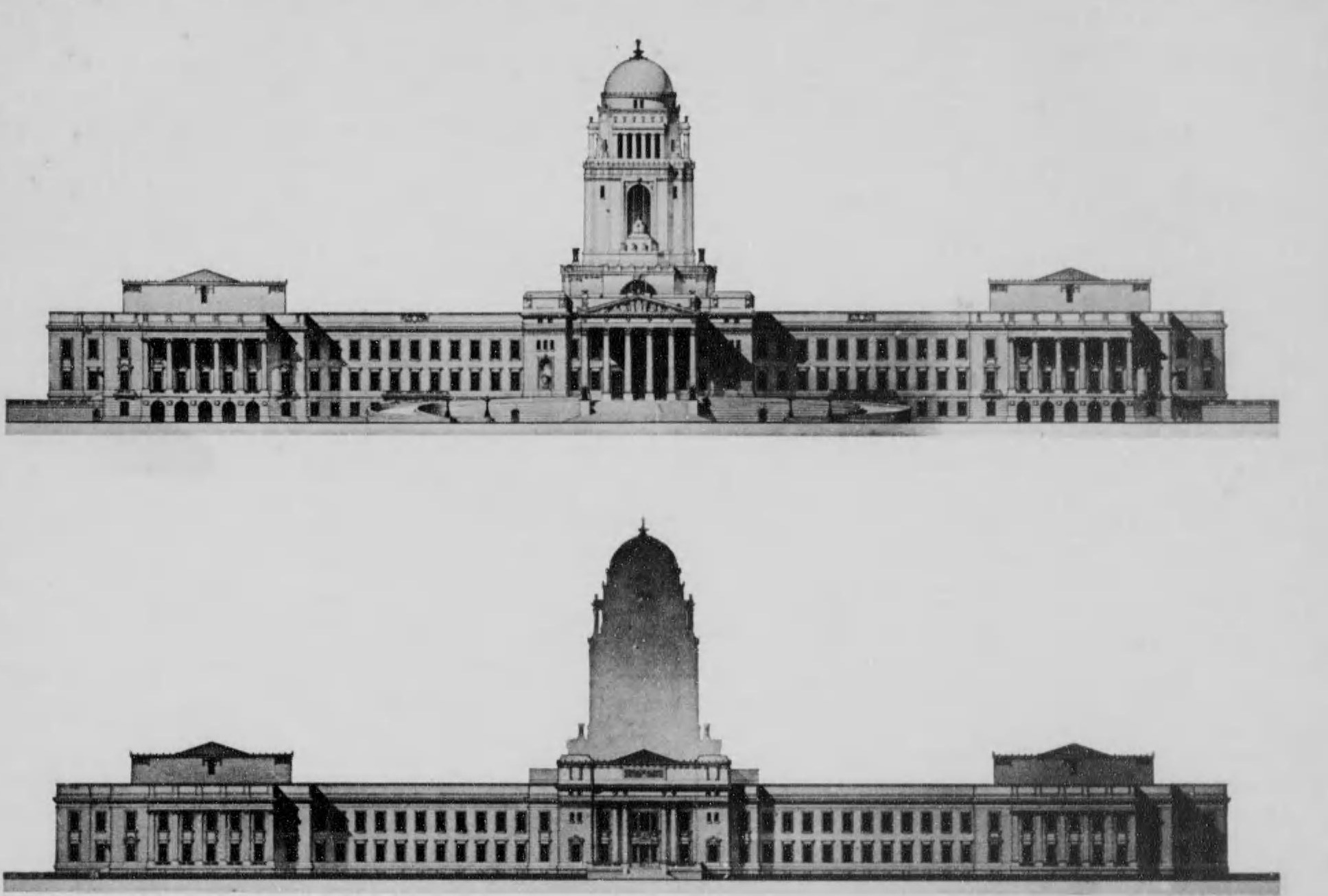
Watanabe Fukuzo's winning design in the National Diet Building design competition (1920)

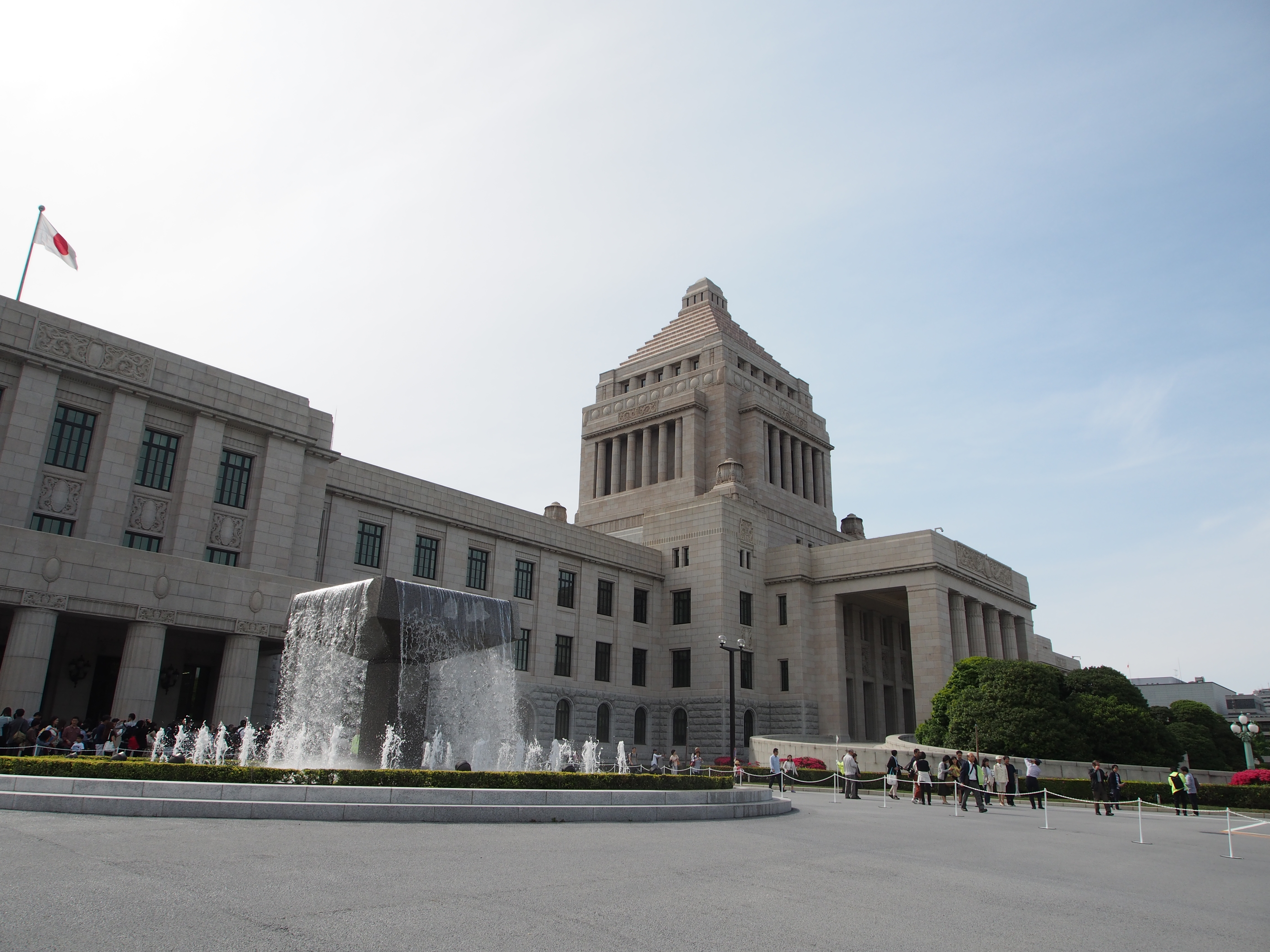
National Diet Building (2017)

== Main facilities ==
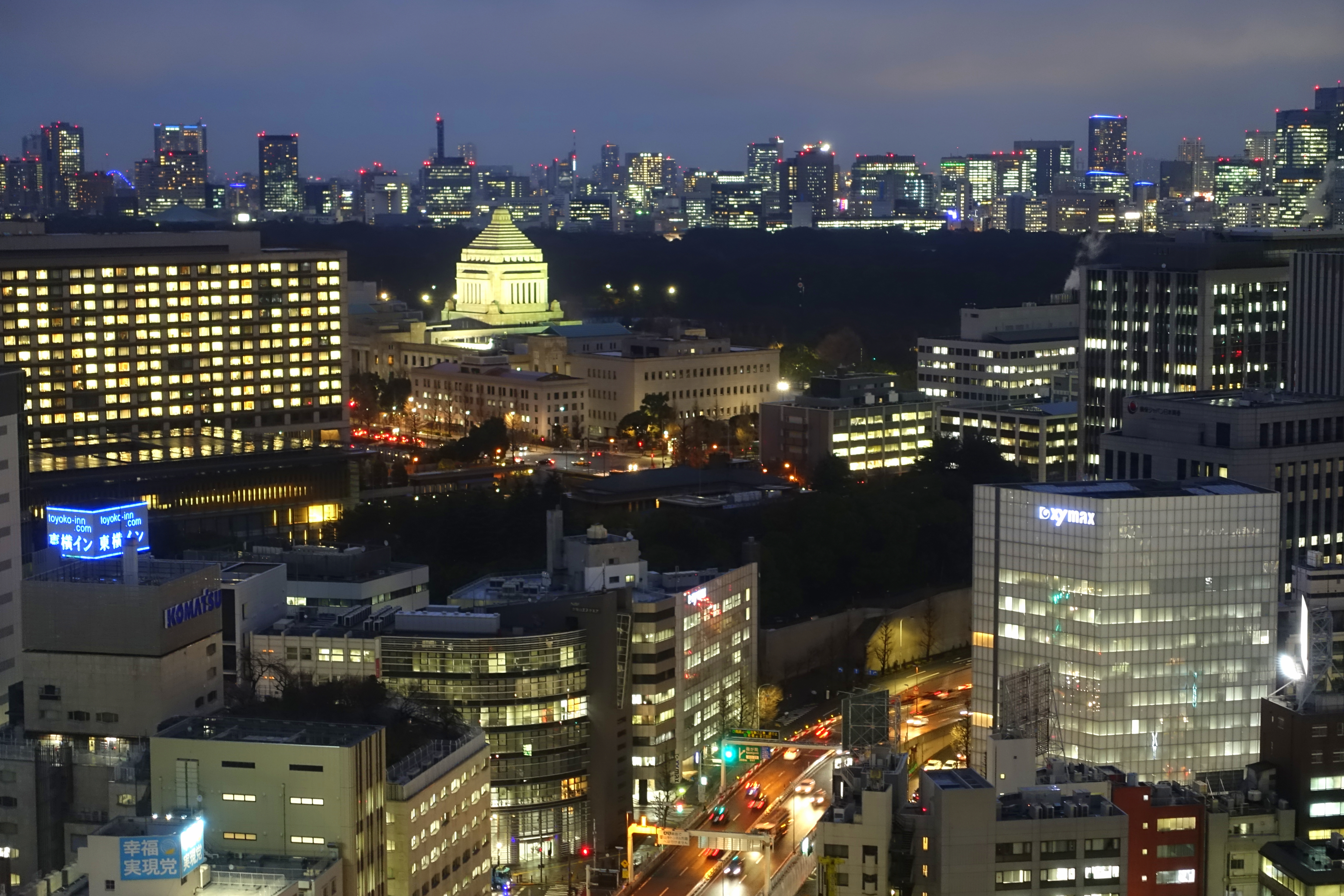
National Diet Building and skyscrapers

The building assigns jurisdiction over the central entrance, the central hall, Gokyusho (emperor's resting space), and the central tower to the House of Councilors (Upper House), the front courtyard to the House of Representatives (Lower House), and the National Diet Library sub-office on the 4th floor of the central tower to the National Diet Library.

=== Central entrance ===
The central entrance stands behind the main gate and below the central tower. It is characterized by the wide driveway and the entrance doors that are made of bronze and each measure 3.94 meters (12.9 ft) in height, 1.09 meters (3 ft 7 in) in width, and 1.125 tons in weight. These doors for the central entrance, the separate entrance doors for each House building, and the bronze doors inside the building were outsourced to and built by Tokyo School of Fine Arts (currently Tokyo University of the Arts).

The central entrance is not for daily use to enter and exit the Diet building and is called "the door that never opens" because of its restricted access. The entrance is used when Diet members attend their first session after a House of Representatives general election or a House of Councilors regular election and when welcoming the Emperor or foreign heads of state into the Diet building. It is also used to allow visitors into the building during open house events.

=== Central hall ===
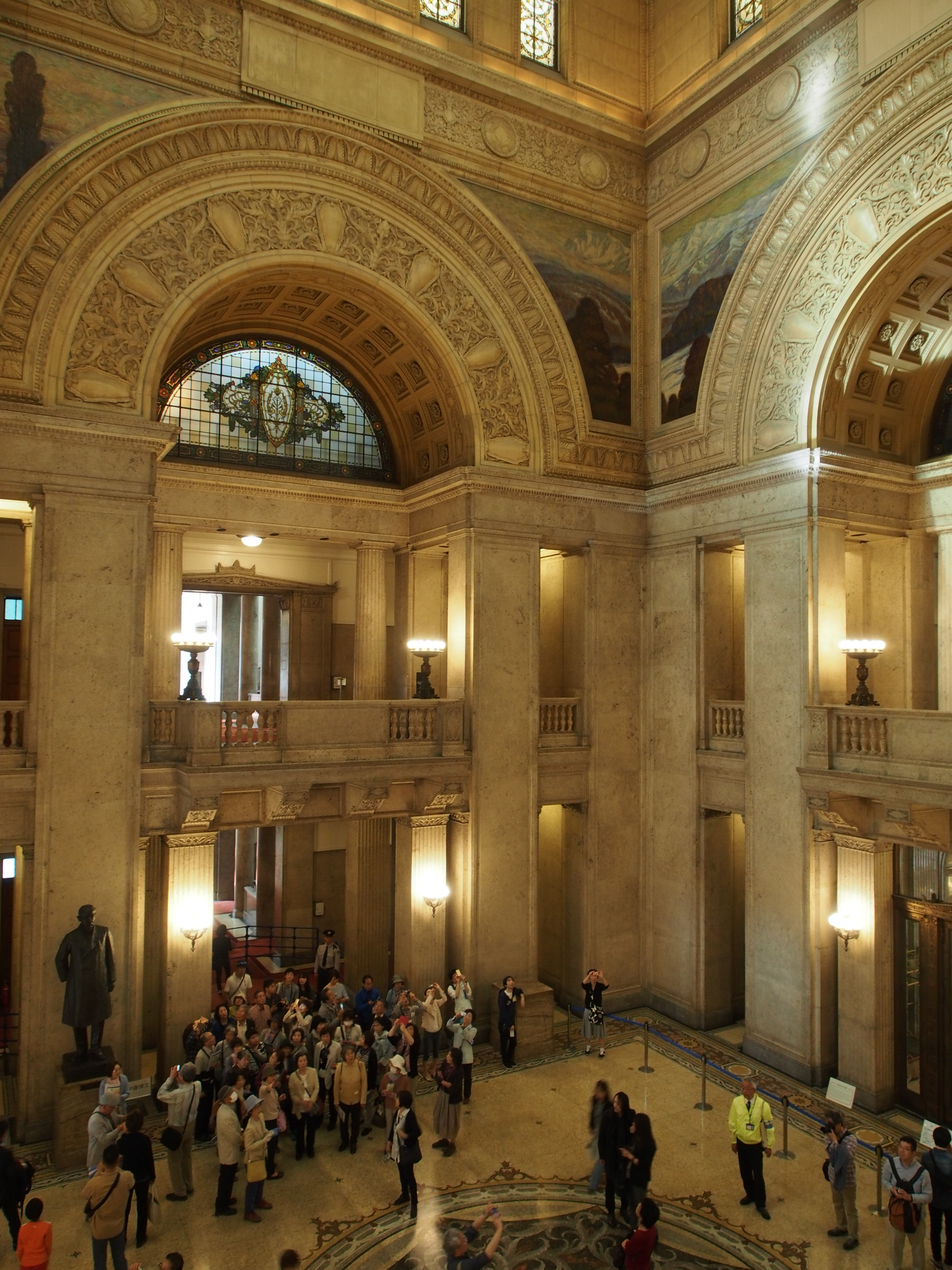
National Diet Building Central Hall

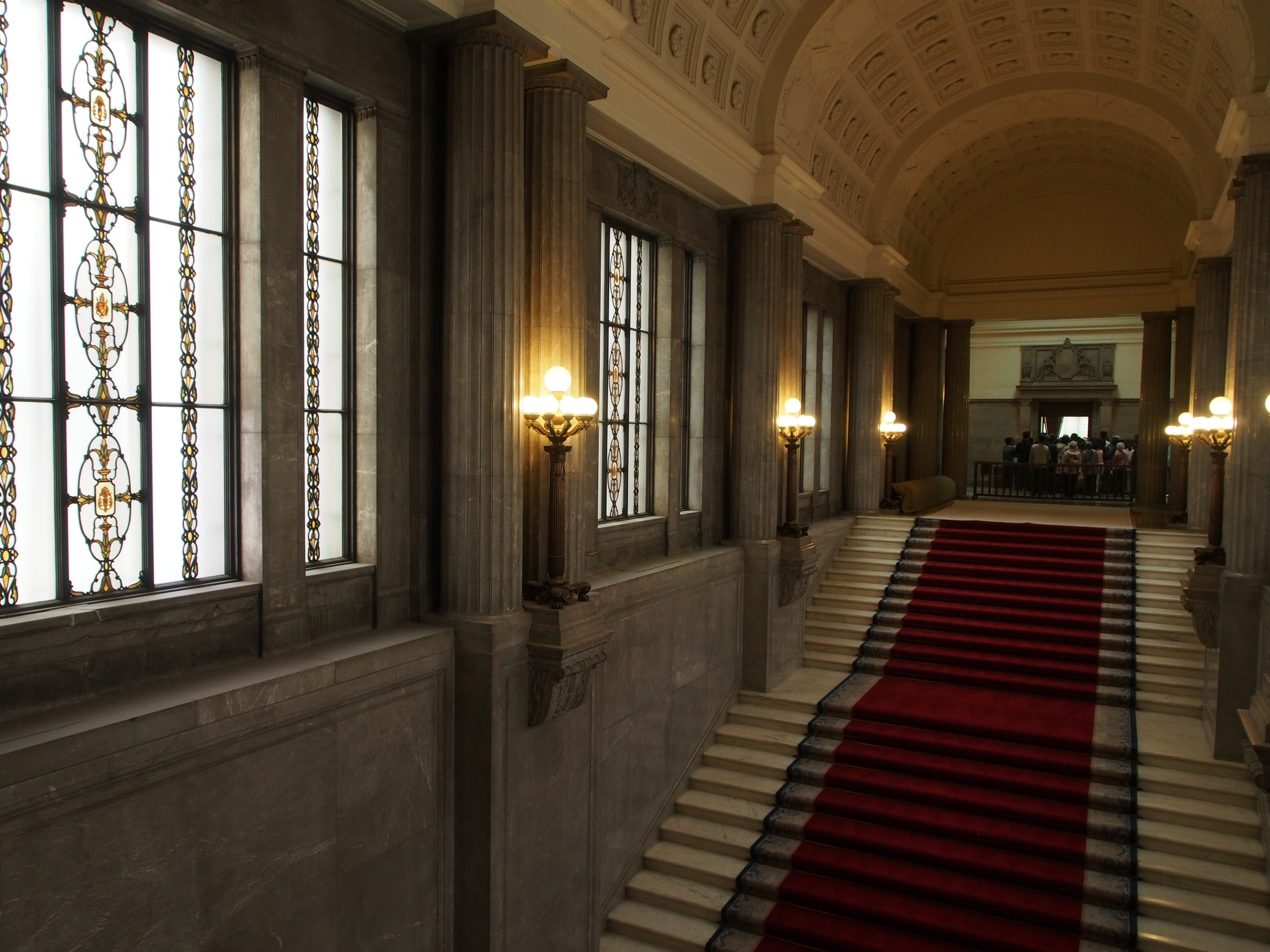
Central stairwell

The lobby behind the central entrance and right below the central tower is what is called the central hall. The hall has a stairwell that reaches from the second floor to the sixth floor and a ceiling that is 32.62 meters (107.0 ft) high. The ceiling is made of stained glass and has four oil paintings of Japan's four seasons in its corners. The paintings each depict Mount Yoshino in the spring, Lake Towada in the summer, Okunikko in the fall, and the Japan Alps in the winter. They were drawn not by famous artists but by art students.

In the four corners of the central hall are statues of Itagaki Taisuke, Okuma Shigenobu, and Ito Hirobumi who were instrumental in establishing constitutional government in Japan, and an empty pedestal. It is not clear why there is an empty pedestal. Some claim original designers could not reach consensus on whose statue to install, or that it encapsulated the idea that politics is never complete. Others say designers left it open to urge politicians today to outstrip the three grand predecessors, or that they avoided erecting a statue with its back to the Imperial palace. The empty pedestal is displayed with a big pine bonsai on the first day of the Diet session.

=== Central tower ===
The central tower measures 65.45 meters (214.7 ft) in height, and surpassed Mitsukoshi's main store (60.61 metres [198.9 ft]) which was the tallest building at the time the Diet building was constructed. It remained the tallest building in Japan until Hotel New Otani’s main 73-metre (240 ft)-building was constructed in 1964.

Inside the pyramid-shaped dome is a large hall, from the center of which a spiral staircase leads up to the observatory on the top floor of the tower. The seven-square-metre (75 sq ft) observatory is said to have offered a panoramic view over Tokyo, but both the observatory and the hall are closed today to all but the building manager. Even Diet members must obtain permission to enter.

The fourth floor of the central tower is a sub-office of the National Diet Library and can be used freely by anyone affiliated with the Diet. The fourth floor does not have a restroom because it would be situated above the restroom designated for the Emperor, located nearby Gokyusho (as described later).

In September 2003, the central tower was hit by lightning, and the granite stone at the top of the tower ruptured, breaking the stained glass beneath. Employees of Kajima Corporation who happened to be present at the scene to fix a restroom requested help from their own company which ended up being in charge of the repair work of the tower. The ruptured granite stone is currently owned by Tohoku University and the Kiseki Museum of World Stones in Fujinomiya, Shizuoka.

=== Gokyūsho ===
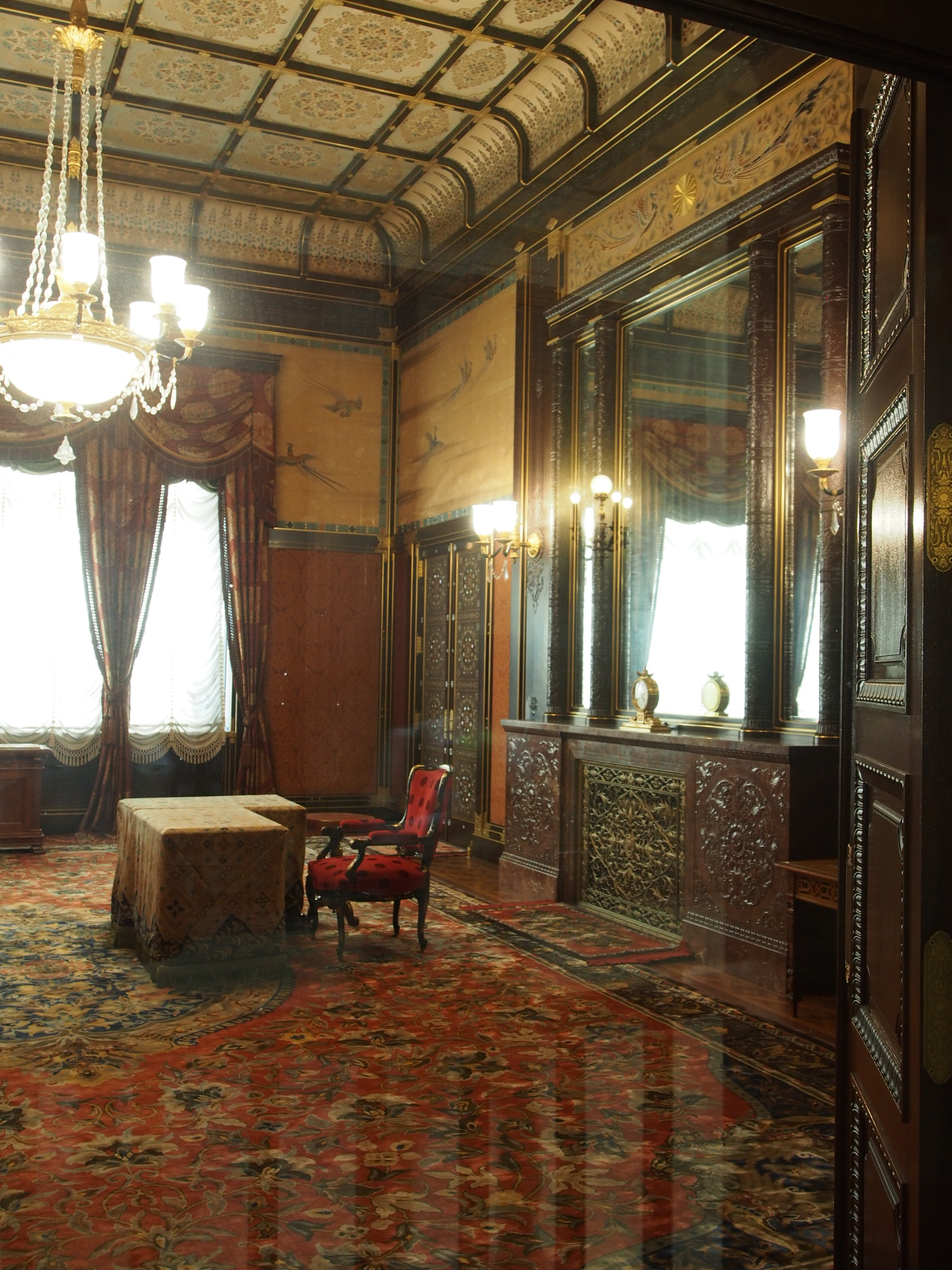
Gokyūsho (Emperor's room)

The Gokyūsho (御休所) was originally referred to as Gobinden (御便殿) and was built as a place for the Emperor to rest upon his visit to the Diet to attend events like the opening and closing ceremonies. The chamber is located at the top of the main stairway covered with a red carpet that leads from the central hall. The L-shaped desk for the Emperor is a remnant from the pre-war era when the Emperor dressed in military uniform and needed a place to put his headdress to use his right hand to sign documents, while having his left side (carrying the sword) unencumbered. In this room, the Emperor receives courtesy visits from chairmen and vice chairmen of both Houses before attending the opening ceremony in the Chamber of the House of Councilors.

Approximately ten percent of the total construction cost was spent on the Gokyūsho, which is made entirely of cypress coated with Japanese lacquer, the exterior adornments above the room are made from Hototogisu (cuculiform), a type of marble, extracted in Anan, Tokushima. The materials and decorations used for this room are particularly rich in craftsmanship and glamour among all the rooms in the Diet building. The chandelier is made of crystal. A private restroom for the Emperor stands close to Gokyūsho and has both western and Japanese style toilets.

When the Emperor travels between the Imperial Palace and the Diet, he is escorted by police motorcade, police cars, and an open limousine accompanied by Imperial Palace guards and law enforcement officials from the Tokyo police department. Diet guards put on white ceremonial robes in the summer and black robes in the winter on the day of the Emperor's visit. It is said that Mount Fuji could be viewed from the windows of Gokyūsho before office buildings blocked the view. Much of the interiors of the Diet building are designed by Naigai Technos Co.

=== Chambers of the House of Representatives and the House of Councillors ===
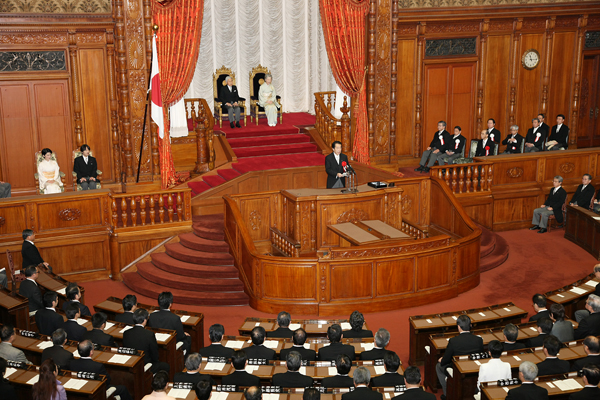
Emperor Akihito and Empress Michiko seated in the Chamber of the House of Councillors, with members of the imperial family, the cabinet, and prime minister Naoto Kan giving the government's speech in front of the assembled members of parliament (2010)

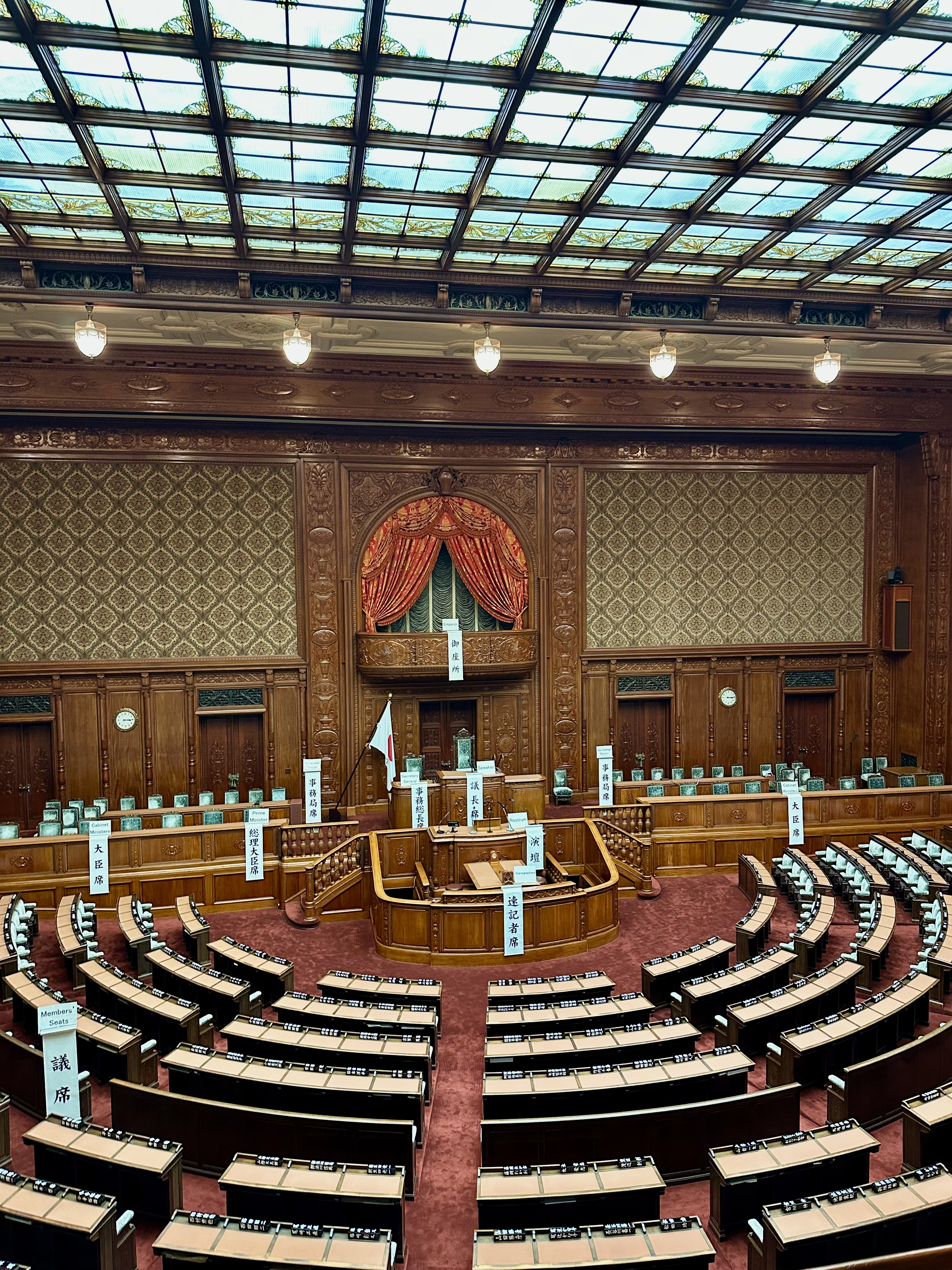
House of Representatives

These large halls are usually called the "main chambers" and are located on the 2nd floor of each House building with a ceiling that opens up to the 3rd floor. The ceiling is partly made from stained glass which lets in sunlight, so the ceiling lights are kept turned off unless there is a plenary assembly in the chamber. The floor is structured in the so-called "continental" fashion; the floor forms a fan shape with the chairman and the podium at its center, and member seats are allotted to each parliamentary group in accordance to their size.

The chairman sits in the center accompanied by the secretary general on his right. The podium stands in front of the chairman's seat, and the stenographer sits beneath the podium. Two rows of seats stretch on both sides of the chair, the front row for cabinet members (the seat closest to the chairman is for the Prime Minister) and the back row for the Diet administrative staffs.

The Diet members' seats are designated by the chairman at the beginning of a Diet session but can be switched during a session if necessary. The House of Representatives makes it a custom to allocate larger parliamentary groups to the chairman's right. In other words, the majority party will sit on the furthest right to the chairman followed by the second largest party, and independents sit in the far left. In the House of Councillors, by contrast, the largest parliamentary group sits in the center with smaller groups on either side. Within a parliamentary group, members who have been elected the fewest times are seated in the front rows closest to the chairman, while those with a longer record as politicians sit in the back rows. Each seat has a number and a name plate with white letters in a black background.

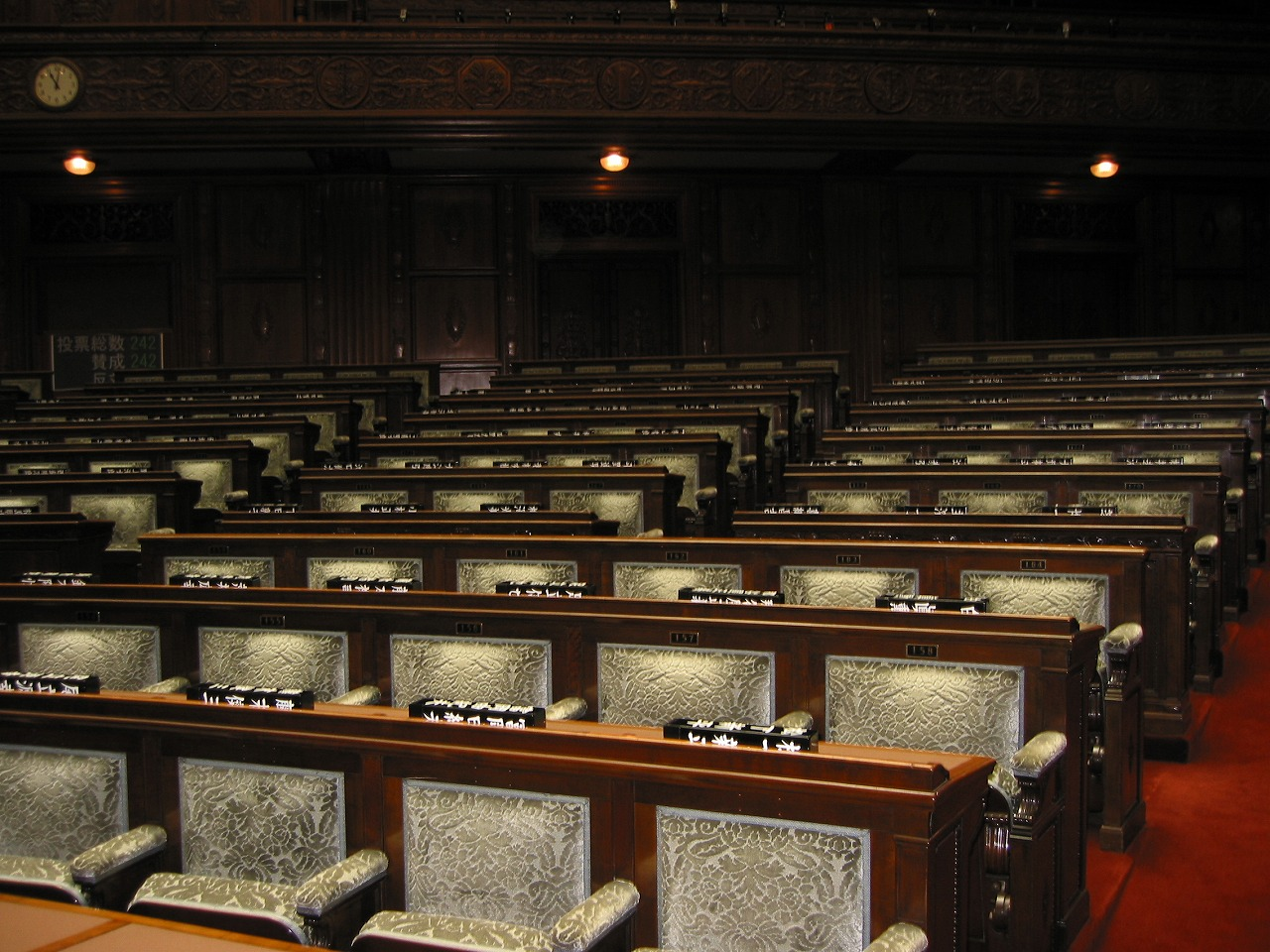
The House of Councillors. Name plates are erected when in attendance.

In the House of Councillors, the Emperor's throne is at the top of the stairs behind the chairman's seat which will be removed in preparation for the opening ceremony. As a legacy of the historic custom to invite the Emperor to the Chamber of the House of Peers in the opening ceremony of the Imperial Diet, even today the opening ceremonies invite the Emperor to the Chamber of the House of Councillors, a successor of the House of Peers, where the Emperor makes his opening statement from his throne. In the Chamber of the House of Councillors, the microphones are only for the chairman and the podium, while in the Chamber of the House of Representatives, they are also given to the secretary general who report voting results and the Diet member in charge of making procedural motions.

There are currently 242 members of the House of Councillors but 460 seats in the Chamber as members of the House of Representatives also attend the opening ceremony held at the Chamber. The number of seats, however, is still not enough to accommodate the entire 722 members of the Diet, so at the opening ceremony Diet members are sometimes seen standing in the aisles or space in the back of the floor.

Both Chambers prohibit Diet members from entering without a jacket and a member badge based on precedent (identification cards are accepted since 2005). No exceptions are allowed to this rule; then-Prime Minister Takeo Fukuda once attempted to enter the Chamber while forgetting to wear his badge and was halted by the guards, the situation of which was resolved when Fukuda hastily borrowed a member badge from a nearby Diet member, Yoshiro Mori.

Parenthetically, either House restricts its members from wearing hats, coats, scarfs, or carrying umbrellas or walking sticks without permission from the chairman. Smoking is also prohibited. Diet members are also forbidden to read newspapers and literature other than reference materials.

=== Committees ===
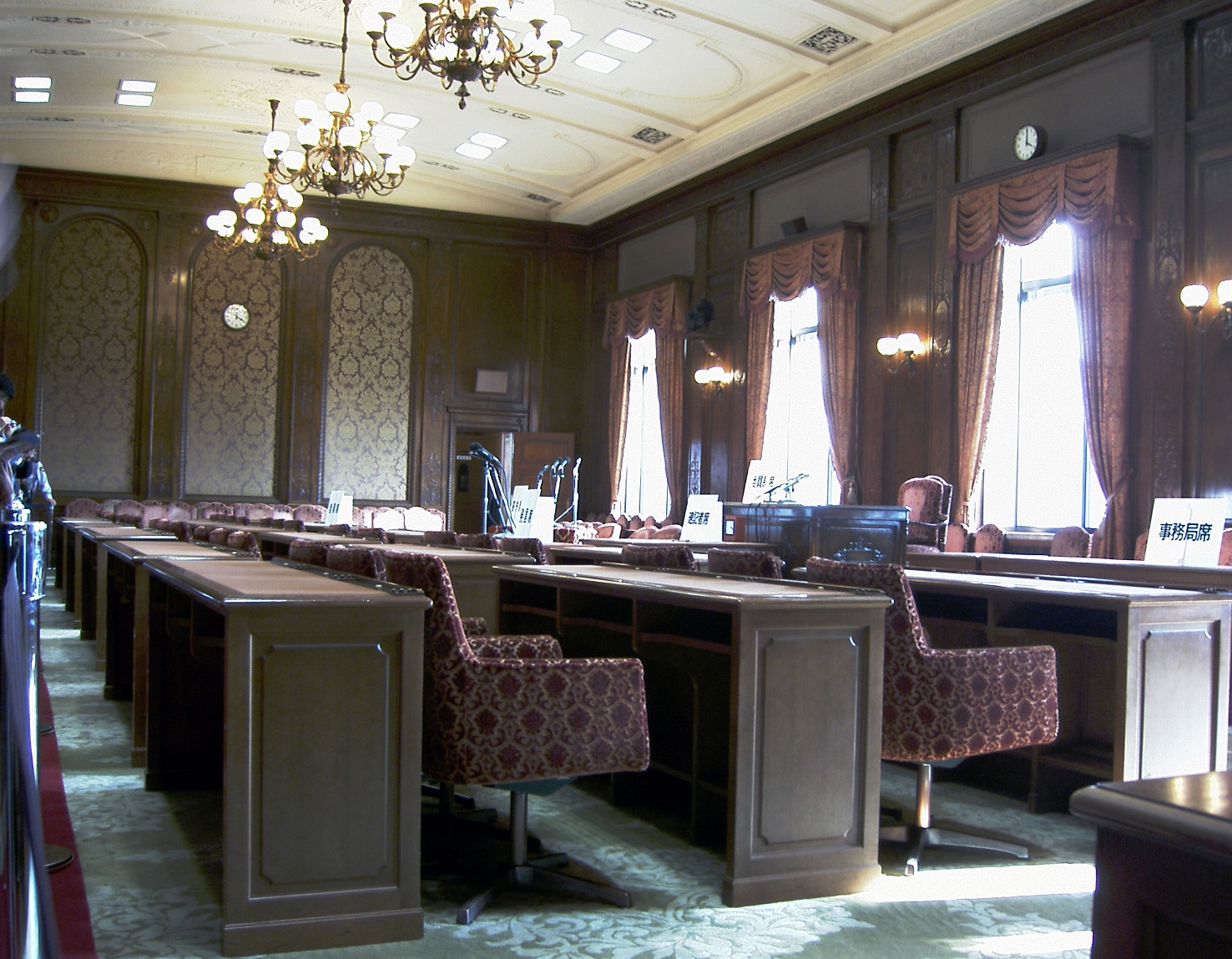
Committee room

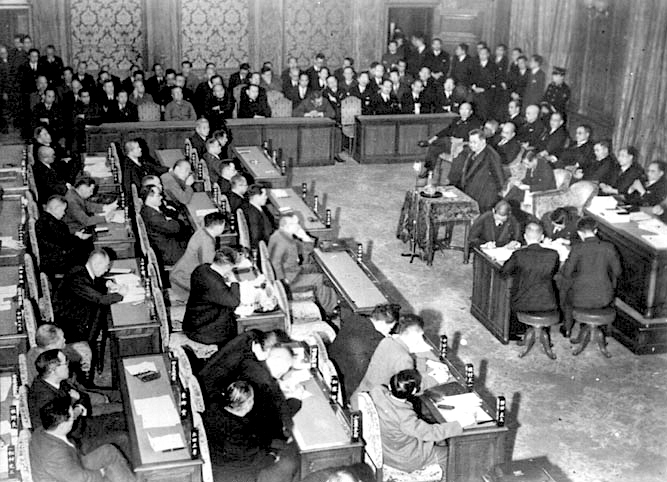
Committee room during World War II (1944)

The largest committee room in each House is Committee Room Number 1 which is widely known for its live broadcasts and where the budget committee, key special committees and political party debates are hosted. Summoning of sworn and unsworn witnesses also takes place in this room.

=== Public gallery ===
Above the rear of the Chamber is a public gallery which is physically a part of the Chamber but is considered a different jurisdiction under the Diet internal regulations. According to those rules, visitors to the public gallery are forbidden from entering the Chamber.

The public gallery in the House of Representatives is divided into seats for VIPs, diplomats, members of the House of Councillors, government officials, the general public and journalists. The public gallery in the House of Councillors accommodates the imperial family, VIPs, foreign diplomats, members of the House of Representatives, government officials, the general public and journalists. The general public seats are partly assigned to guests invited by a Diet member with the rest open to visitors on a first-come-first-served basis.

Visitors to the public gallery must have admission tickets. Newspaper and news service reporters receive passes valid for an entire Diet session. The public gallery must follow internal statutes mandated by the chairman, and the chairman retains the authority to command the guards and law enforcement officials to maintain order in the public gallery.

== Gallery ==
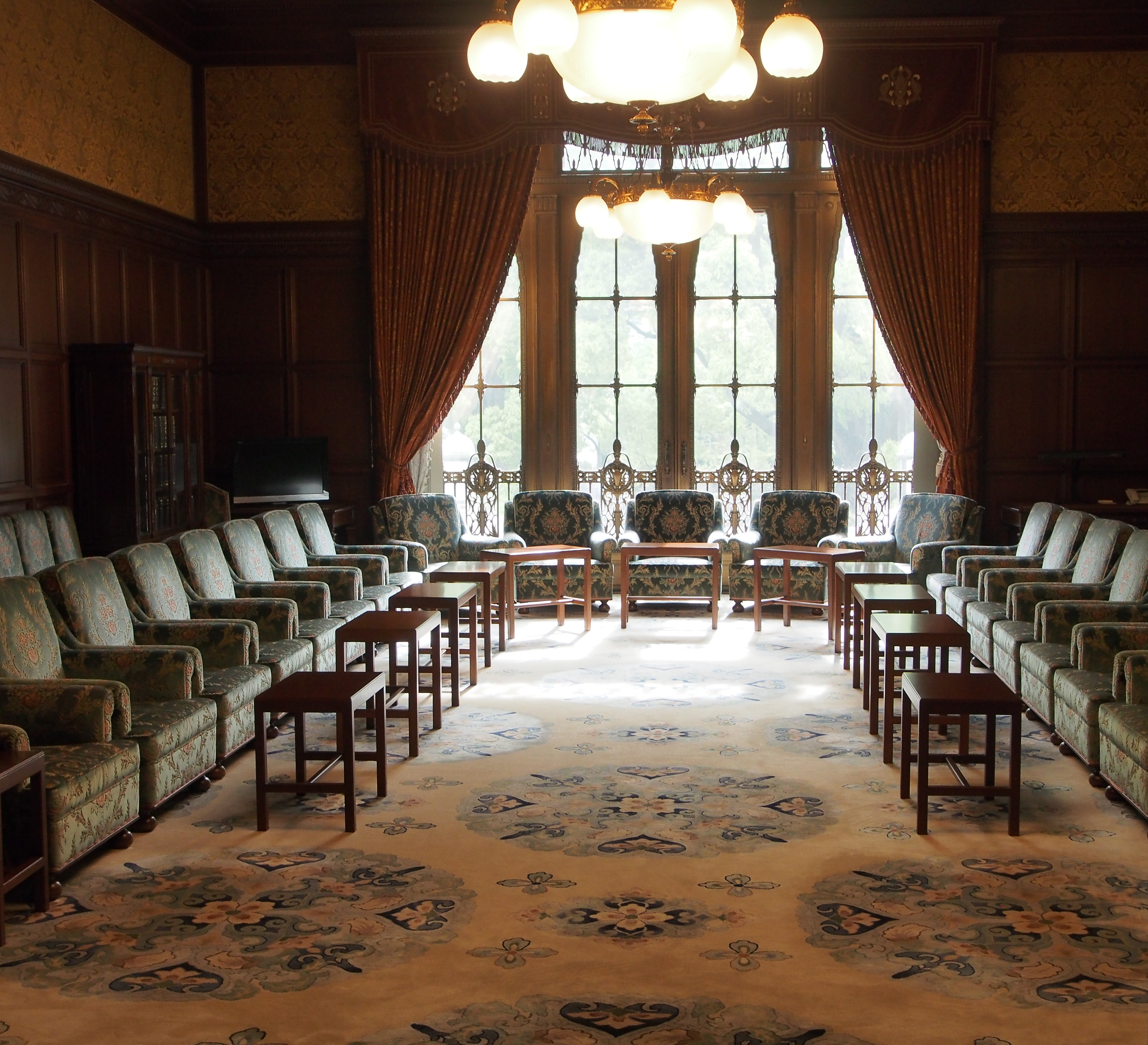
The ministers room

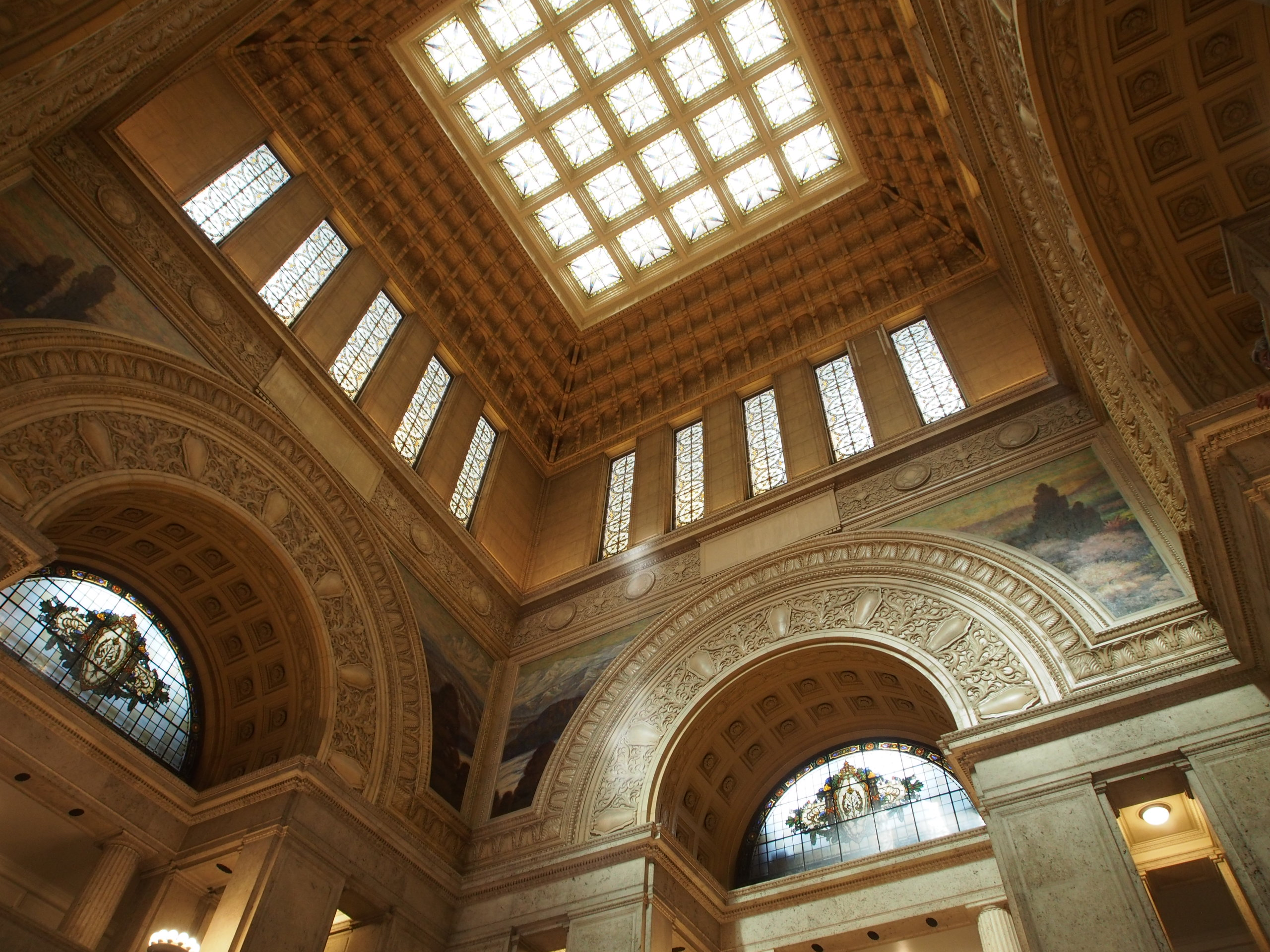
Central hall Ceiling

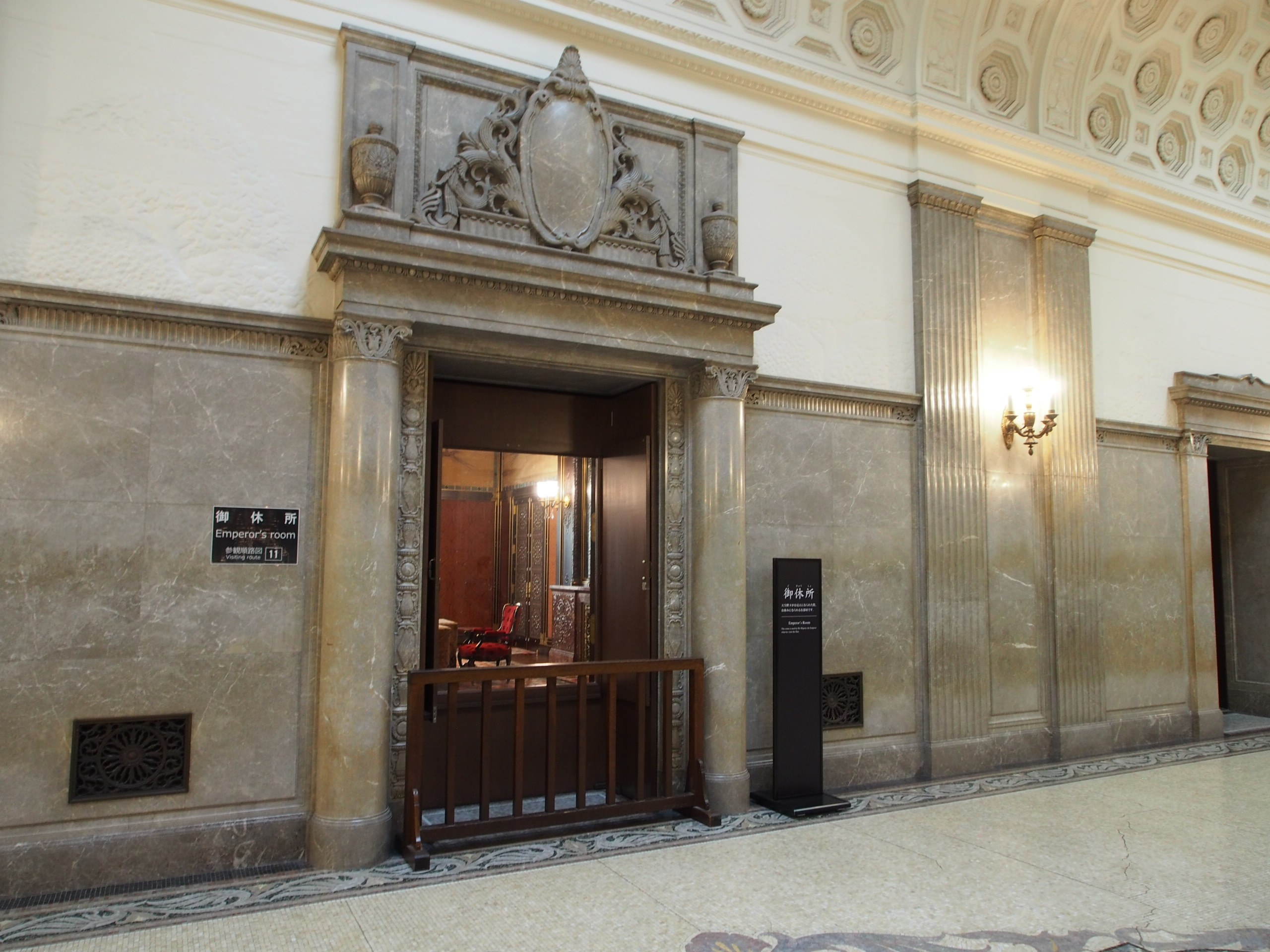
Emperor's Room

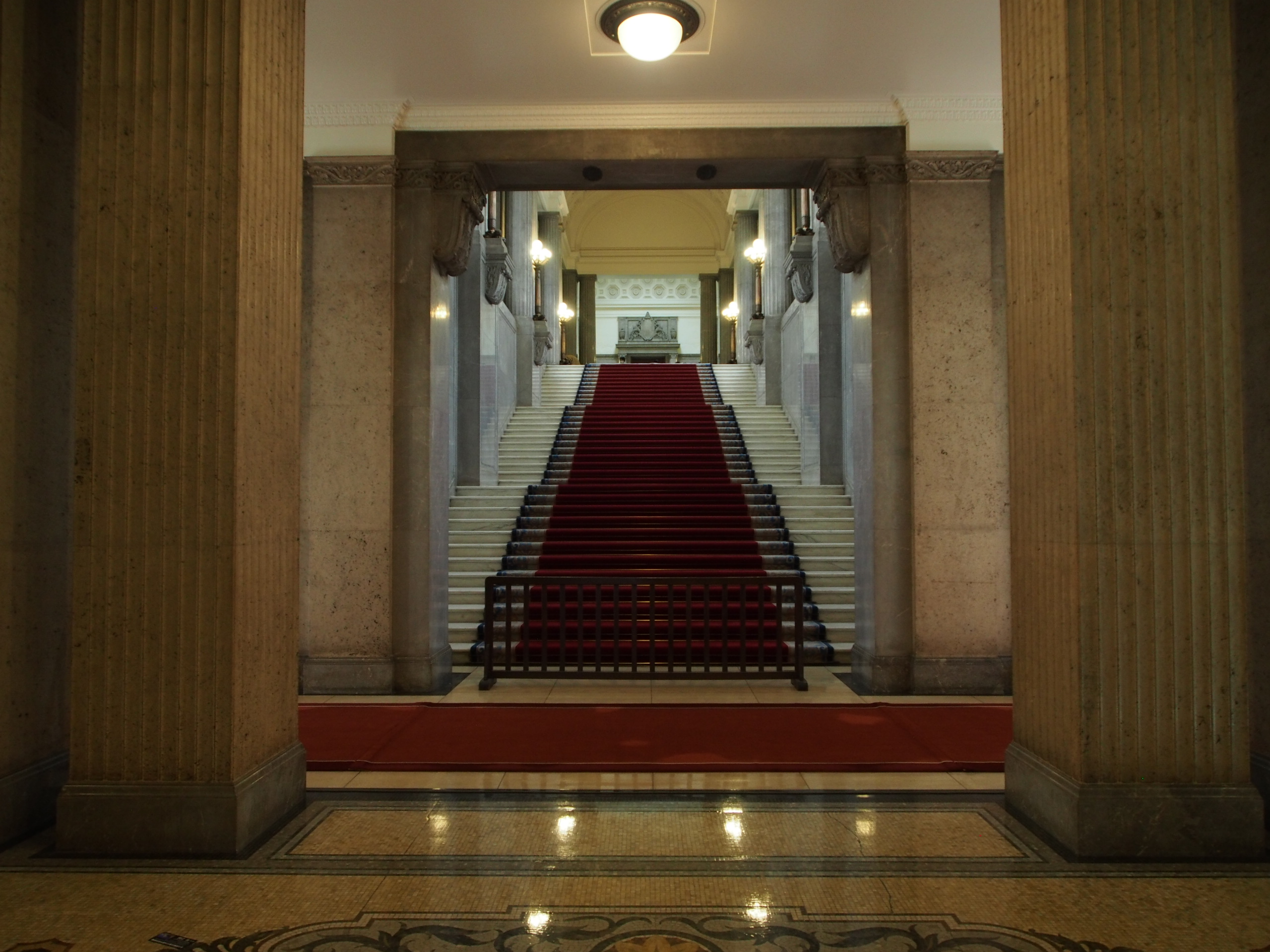
Staircase

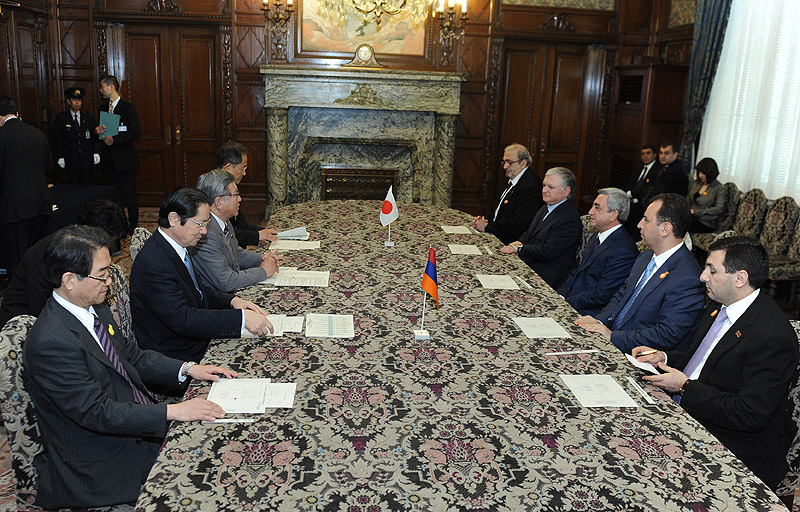
Drawing Room of the Speaker of the House of Representatives

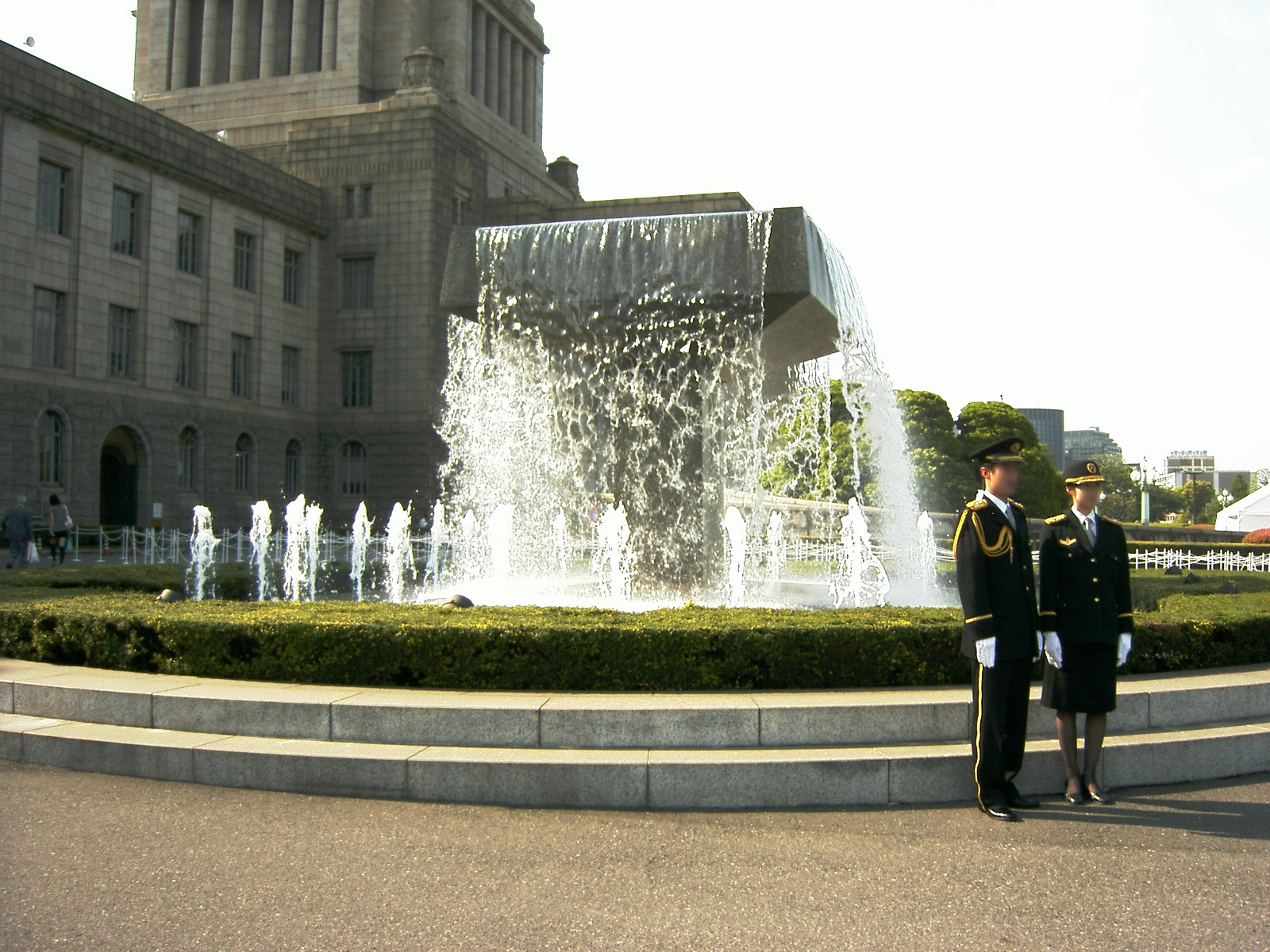
Fountain

== See also ==
- Prime Minister's Official Residence (Japan)
- Art Deco
- Mausoleum at Halicarnassus
- Kokkai-gijidō-mae Station
