= Sky Fort =

Skyscraper in Sofia, Bulgaria

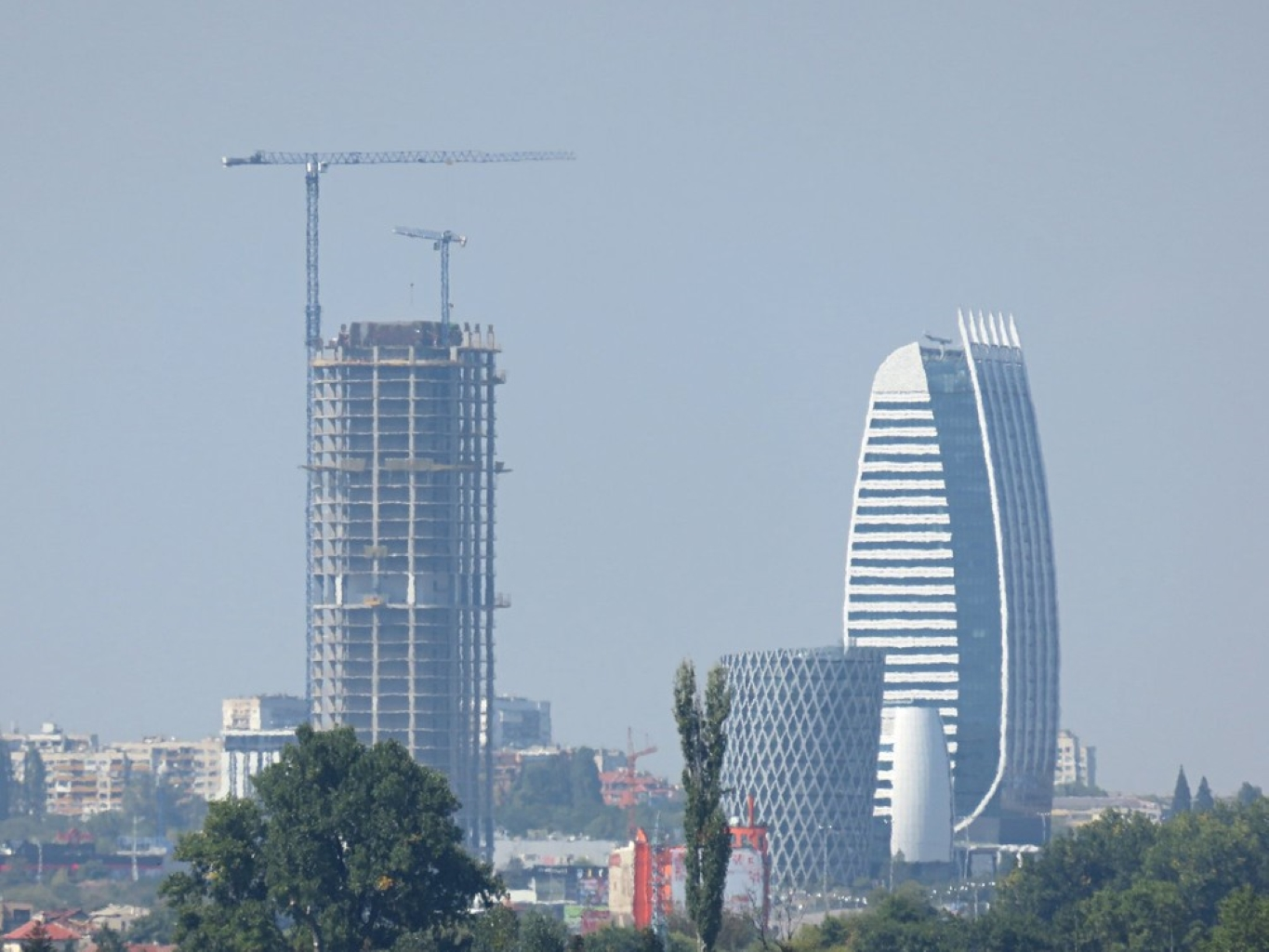
- Sky Fort (left skyscraper) under construction in September 2020

General information
- Status: Topped out
- Type: Office
- Location: Sofia, Bulgaria
- Coordinates: 42°38′46.6″N 23°23′40.4″E
- Construction started: 2017
- Topped-out: 2023
- Completed: 2026
- Owner: Variant Sofia Group

Height
- Roof: 202.2 m (663 ft)

Technical details
- Floor count: 49 (+ 3 below ground)
- Floor area: 82,000 m^{2} (882,641 sq ft)
- Lifts/elevators: 19

Design and construction
- Architects: A&A Architects
- Developer: Fort Noks
- Structural engineer: STRUKTO

Website
- http://www.skyfort.bg/

The Sky Fort is an office skyscraper in Sofia, Bulgaria. Situated along Tsarigradsko shose, the busiest thoroughfare in the city, the skyscraper is positioned near the Tsarigradsko shose Metro Station. The building topped out in 2023, and is the tallest building in Bulgaria and the Balkans outside of Turkey. At a height of 202.2 m (663 ft), the building contains 49 floors and encompasses a total floor area of 82,000 m^{2} (882,641 sq ft).

The building features three underground floors dedicated to parking, with construction scheduled for completion in late 2026.

Beyond the 36 office floors, the skyscraper features a ground-level café, three technical floors and a two-level restaurant at the summit that includes a panoramic observation deck. A panoramic elevator provides transport between the restaurant and the observation deck. The building incorporates a total of 19 elevators, with four connecting the ground and underground levels, 13 high-speed units serving the office floors, one cargo elevator and one dedicated emergency rescue unit.

== Location ==
The building is located on Tsarigradsko shose, one of the largest and busiest boulevards in Sofia. Together with Capital Fort, they form the neighborhood of Sofia Skyscraper Center - a cluster of high-rise buildings. The area is serviced by bus lines and the Tsarigradsko shose Metro Station of Sofia Metro.

== See also ==
- List of tallest buildings in Sofia
- List of tallest buildings in Bulgaria
- List of tallest buildings in Europe
- List of tallest buildings by city
- List of tallest buildings by country
- Capital Fort
