= Hotel Marinela Sofia =

Hotel in Sofia, Bulgaria

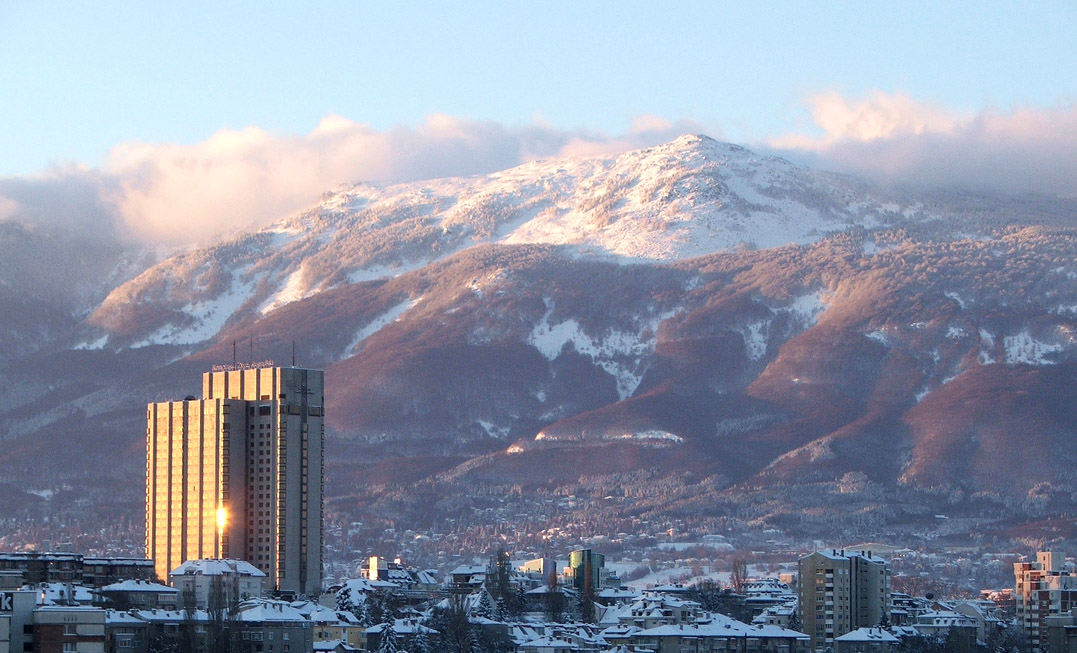
- Interactive map of the Hotel Marinela Sofia area
- Former names: Hotel Kempinski

General information
- Type: Hotel
- Location: Sofia, Bulgaria
- Coordinates: 42°40′20″N 23°19′7″E
- Completed: 1979

Height
- Antenna spire: 98 m (322 ft)
- Roof: 90 m (300 ft)

Technical details
- Floor count: 22

Design and construction
- Architect: Kisho Kurokawa

Hotel Marinela Sofia is a 5-star hotel located in Lozenets, near downtown Sofia, Bulgaria. It is considered one of the most luxurious hotels in the capital of Bulgaria, featuring 442 guest rooms, 10 conference rooms, 4 restaurants, 2 bars and a nightclub. It also hosts the only Japanese garden in the Balkans.

The hotel was built as the Vitosha New Otani by the Japanese New Otani Hotels chain between 1974 and 1979, to the design of leading Japanese architect Kisho Kurokawa (1934–2007) in the upper-class neighbourhood Lozenets. In his design, Kurokawa implemented architectural details inspired by the Bulgarian National Revival style of Koprivshtitsa and Plovdiv. The 21-storey hotel was built by Bulgarian company Tehnoeksportstroy and the Japanese Mitsubishi. Its Japanese garden was a large-scale copy of the one at the original Hotel New Otani Tokyo and one of its main features is a Japanese-style garden with a typical Japanese house and lake.

== See also ==
- List of tallest buildings in Sofia
