= List of tallest buildings in Bulgaria =

According to data of municipal firm Sofproekt-OGP, the majority of the tallest buildings in Bulgaria are located in the Mladost district, in Sofia.

== Completed in Bulgaria ==
Was the tallest building in Bulgaria upon completion

Rank	Name	Location	Height m	Floors	Year	Use
1	Sky Fort	Sofia	202	49	2026	Office
2	Capital Fort	Sofia	126	28	2015	Office
3	Millennium Center 1 — Hotel Tower	Sofia	121	32	2018	Hotel
4	Millennium Center 2 — Office Tower	Sofia	108	24	2016	Office
5	NV Tower (Sofia) — Office Tower	Sofia	107	21	2021	Office
6	Hotel Rodina	Sofia	104	25	1979	Hotel
7	Hotel Mirage	Burgas	95	21	2003	Hotel
8	Iztok Plaza	Sofia	94	30	2025	Hotel
9	Hotel Dobrudja	Albena	91	19	1983	Hotel
10	Infinity Tower	Sofia	90.5	19	2013	Office
11	GM Stroi	Burgas	90	30	2012	Residential
12	The CITUB building	Sofia	89	22	1978	Office
13	Kempinski Hotel Zografski	Sofia	88	22	1979	Hotel
14	Millennium Center 3 — Residential Tower	Sofia	84	18	2017	Residential
15	Park Hotel Moskva	Sofia	82	23	1974	Hotel
16	Sopharma Business Center — Tower 3	Sofia	81	22	2011	Office
17	Hotel Kuban	Sunny Beach	80	20	1967	Hotel
18	Ministry of Transport and Communications Building	Sofia	80	20	1967	Office
19	Hemus Hotel	Sofia	76	20	1976	Hotel
20	Park Sankt Peterburg Hotel	Plovdiv	76	30	1981	Hotel
21	Hotel Burgas Beach	Sunny Beach	76	19	1967	Hotel
22	Royal City Business Park	Plovdiv	75	17	2010	Office
23	Smart Tower	Sofia	75	24	2025	Mixed
24	Sopharma Business Center — Tower 2	Sofia	74.7	19	2011	Office
25	TELUS tower	Sofia	74.5	20	2017	Office
26	Lazuren Briag	Burgas	74	22	2017	Residential
27	Princess Hotel Sofia	Sofia	74	17	1977	Hotel
28	Diamond Arteks	Sofia	72	22	2021	Residential
29	Block 1V — Mladost	Sofia	72	24		Residential
30	Vivacom headquarters	Sofia	70	17	2010	Office
31	Benchmark Tower	Sofia	70	17	2009	Office
32	Mega Park Sofia	Sofia	70	17	2010	Office
33	Vidin Municipality Building	Vidin	70	16		Office
34	CCB Headquarters	Sofia	70	14	1969	Office
35	Varna Towers — Tower 1 & 2	Varna	70	16	2010	Office

== Under construction ==
Rank	Name	Location	Height m	Floors	Year	Notes
1	Zlaten vek	Sofia	~120	30	2023	
2	I Tower	Sofia	113	30	2023	

== Proposed ==
Rank	Name	Location	Height m	Floors	Year	Notes
1	V tower 1	Sofia	305	70+	2015	
2	V tower 2	Sofia	215		2015	
3	Astral Tower	Varna	140	40	2020	
4	Sofia Expo tower	Sofia	102		2017	
5	East fort	Sofia	79,5		2015	

== See also ==
- List of tallest buildings in Sofia
- List of tallest buildings in Europe
