= List of tallest buildings in Sofia =

This list of tallest buildings in Sofia ranks buildings in the Bulgarian capital city Sofia by height.

== Completed buildings ==
Rank	Name	Height m	Floors	Year	Use	Notes
1	Sky Fort	202	49	2026	Office	Currently the tallest building in Bulgaria
2	Capital Fort	126	28	2015	Office	
3	Millennium Center - Hotel Tower	121	32	2017	Hotel	Tallest hotel building in Bulgaria
4	NV Tower	107	18	2021	Office	
5	Millennium Center - Office Tower	105	24	2017	Office	
6	Hotel Rodina	104	25	1981	Hotel	
7	CITUB Building	99	22	1978	Office	
8	Hotel Marinela Sofia	98	22	1979	Hotel	
9	Iztok Plaza	94	30	2024	Office, Hotel	
10	Infinity Tower	90.5	19	2013	Office	
11	Hemus Hotel	86	20	1976	Hotel	
12	Sopharma Business Center - Tower 3	85.2	22	2011	Office	
13	Park Hotel Moskva	82.5	23	1956	Hotel	
14	Administrative building of the National Palace of Culture (PRONO)	82	19	1981	Office	
15	Millenium Center - Residential Tower	80	18	2017	Residential	
16	Building of Energoproekt	80	19	1969	Office	
17	Antim Tower	79	20	2005	Office	
18	Balkan Business Center	76.4	20	2019	Office	
19	Sopharma Business Center - Tower 2	74.7	19	2011	Office	
20	City Tower	74	20	2017	Office	
21	Princess Hotel Sofia	74	17	1977	Hotel	
22	Block 1V, Mladost 1	72	24	?	Residential	
23	Block 297 Sveta Troica	70	23	1989	Residential	
24	Block 298 Sveta Troica	70	23	1989	Residential	
25	Block 298A Sveta Troica	70	23	1989	Residential	
26	Block 299 Sveta Troica	70	23	1989	Residential	
27	Block 356 Sveta Troica	70	23	1989	Residential	
28	Block 357 Sveta Troica	70	23	1989	Residential	
29	Block 358 Sveta Troica	70	23	1989	Residential	
30	Diamond Arteks	70	20	2018	Residential	
31	Bulgarian Telecommunications Co. headquarters	70	17	2010	Office	Part of The Mall (Sofia)
32	Benchmark Tower	70	17	2009	Office	
33	Mega Park Sofia	70	17	2010	Office	
34	Vertigo Building	66.6	17	2011	Office	
35	Zona B-19 Block 11–12	66	22	?	Residential	
36	Zona B-19 Block 13–14	66	22	1988	Residential	
37	Zona B-19 Block 15–16	66	22	1993	Residential	
38	Mladost 2 Block 213	66	22		Residential	
39	Mladost 3 Block 370	66	22		Residential	
40	Headquarters of CCBank	60	14	1969	Office	Former Hotel "Pliska"
41	Elipse Center	50	15	2018	Office	

== Tallest buildings under construction ==
Rank	Name	Height m	Floors	Year	Status
1	Zlaten Vek	120	34	2023	Under construction
2	I-Tower	113	30	2024	Under construction

== Tallest proposed buildings ==
Proposed buildings
Rank	Name	Height m
1	V-Towers - 1.Tower	305
2	V-Towers - 2.Tower	215
3	Paradise tower	215
4	Sofia Park x4	180

== See also ==
- List of tallest buildings in Bulgaria
- List of tallest structures in Bulgaria
- List of tallest buildings in Europe
