= New Otani Hotels =

Japanese hotel chain

New Otani Co., Ltd. (株式会社ニューオータニ, Kabushiki-gaisha Nyū Ōtani) is a chain of hotels headquartered in Chiyoda, Tokyo, Japan. Their flagship hotel, the Hotel New Otani Tokyo opened in 1964. New Otani Hotels operates 18 hotels inside and 2 hotels outside Japan.

== Group hotels ==
=== Japan ===
A Wedding at the New Otani Makuhari, Chiba

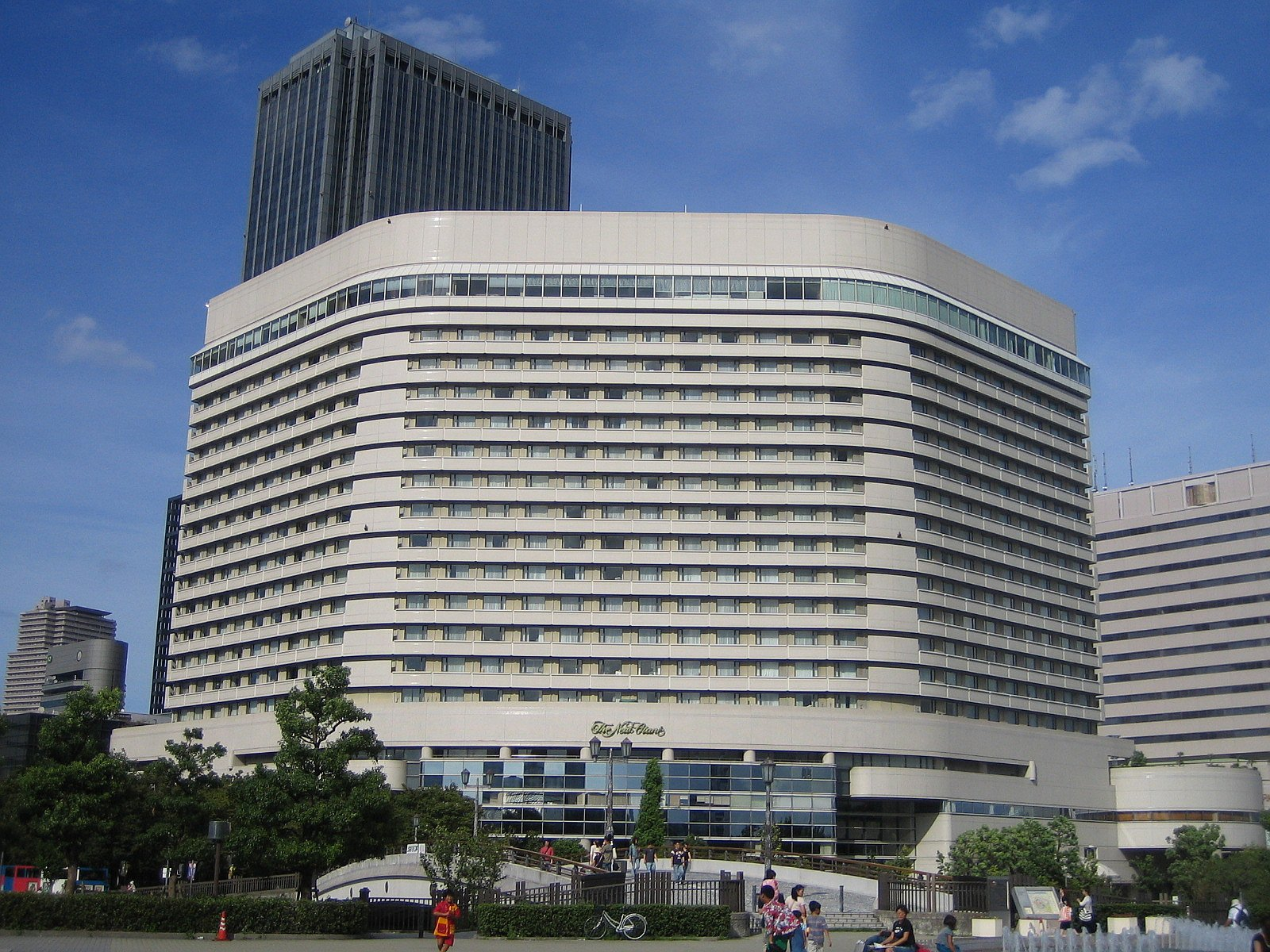
Hotel New Otani Osaka, Osaka Prefecture

- Hokkaidō
  - Hotel New Otani Inn Sapporo (Sapporo)
- Kantō
  - Chiba Prefecture
    - Hotel New Otani Makuhari (Chiba, Chiba)
  - Tokyo
    - Hotel New Otani Tokyo (Chiyoda) (35.681°N 139.7342°E)
    - New Otani Inn Tokyo (Osaki area of Shinagawa)
  - Kanagawa Prefecture
    - New Otani Inn Yokohama (Yokohama)
- Chūbu
  - Niigata Prefecture
    - Hotel New Otani Nagaoka (Nagaoka)
    - The Italia-Ken (Niigata)
    - Yuzawa New Otani Hotel (Yuzawa)
    - NASPA New Otani Resort (Yuzawa)
  - Shizuoka Prefecture
    - Grand Hotel Hamamatsu (Hamamatsu)
  - Toyama Prefecture
    - Unazuki New Otani Hotel (Kurobe)
    - Hotel New Otani Takaoka (Takaoka)
- Kansai
  - Hyōgo Prefecture
    - New Otani Kobe Harborland (Kobe)
  - Osaka Prefecture
    - Hotel New Otani Osaka (Osaka)
- Chūgoku
  - Tottori Prefecture
    - Hotel New Otani Tottori (Tottori)
- Kyūshū
  - Fukuoka Prefecture
    - Hotel New Otani Hakata (Fukuoka)
  - Kumamoto Prefecture
    - Hotel New Otani Kumamoto (Kumamoto)
  - Saga Prefecture
    - Hotel New Otani Saga (Saga)

=== Overseas ===
- People's Republic of China
  - Hotel New Otani Chang Fu Gong (Beijing)
- United States
  - New Otani Kaimana Beach Hotel (Waikiki, Hawaii)

== Associate hotels ==
=== Associate hotels in Japan ===
- Tohoku
  - Yamagata Prefecture
    - Yamagata Grand Hotel (Yamagata)
- Chūbu
  - Ishikawa Prefecture
    - Kanazawa New Grand Hotel (Kanazawa)
- Kansai
  - Shiga Prefecture
    - Hotel New Omi (Omihachiman)

== Former properties ==
- The New Otani Hotel & Garden Los Angeles (Los Angeles, California, United States) (1977–2007)
- Vitosha New Otani (Sofia, Bulgaria) (1979–1997)
- Hotel New Otani Singapore (Singapore) (1984–2004)
