= Hotel New Otani Tokyo =

Building in Tokyo, Japan

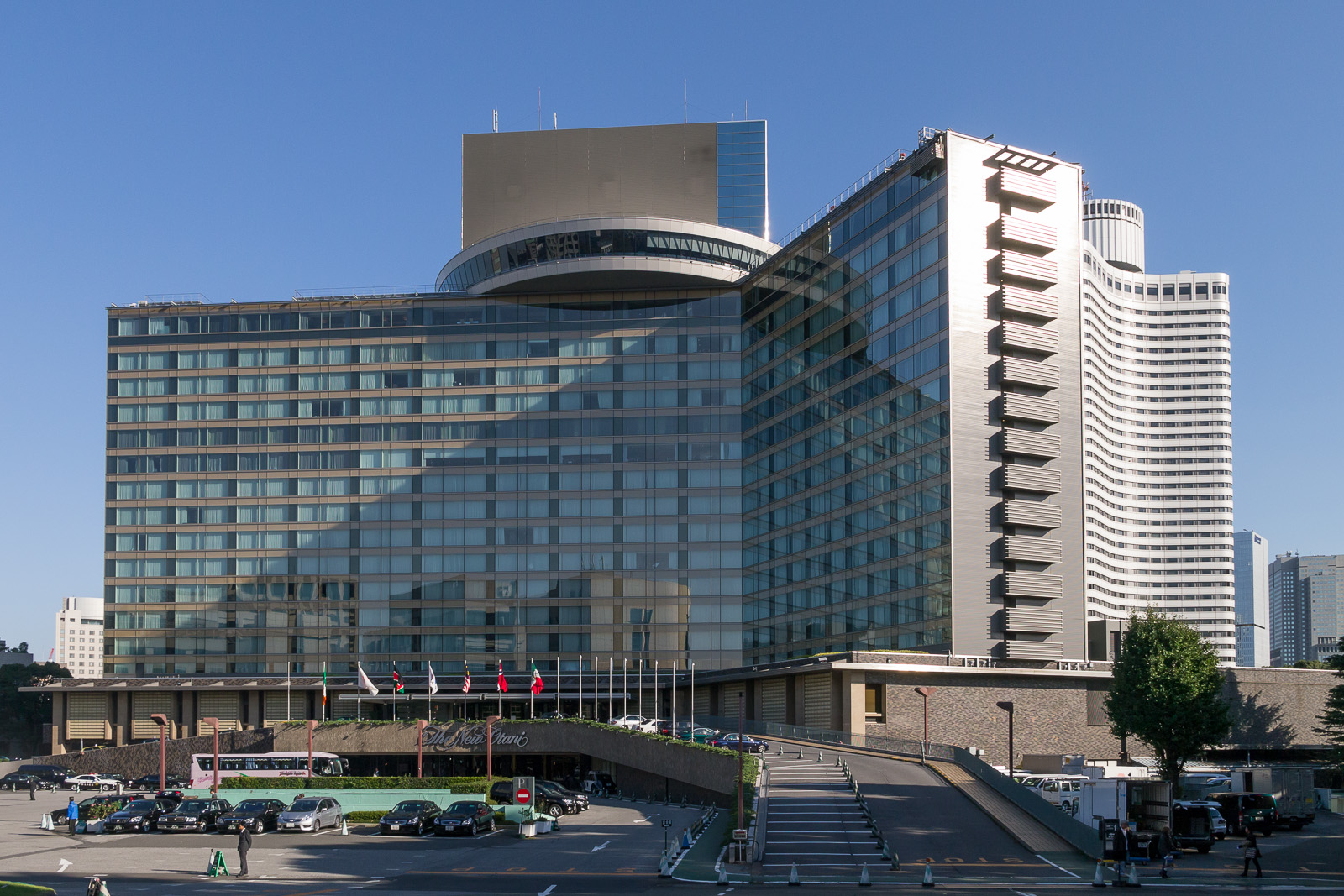
- Hotel New Otani Tokyo - original 1964 "The Main" wing in foreground, 1974 "Garden Tower" in background

General information
- Location: Tokyo, Japan, 4-1 Kioi-cho, Chiyoda-ku
- Coordinates: 35°40′52″N 139°44′03″E
- Opening: 1964
- Operator: New Otani Hotels

Height
- Height: 72.1 metres (237 ft) (The Main); 144.5 metres (474 ft) (Garden Tower)

Technical details
- Floor count: 17, with 2 underground (The Main); 40, with 1 underground (Garden Tower)
- Floor area: 84,411 square metres (908,590 ft^{2}) (The Main); 88,600 square metres (954,000 ft^{2}) (Garden Tower)

Other information
- Number of rooms: 1,479 (638 in The Main, 836 in Garden Tower)
- Number of restaurants: 39

Website
- Official website

The Hotel New Otani Tokyo is a hotel in Chiyoda City, Tokyo, Japan. Opened in 1964 and operated by New Otani Hotels, the hotel has 1,479 rooms and 39 restaurants. It has hosted numerous heads of state and is home to a 400-year-old garden.

== History ==
Construction of the hotel was requested by the Japanese government in the early 1960s, in order to fill a perceived shortage of hotel space for foreign visitors to the upcoming 1964 Summer Olympics. Yonetaro Otani, a former sumo wrestler who founded and ran a small steel company, agreed to build the hotel on a site he owned. It had formerly been the site of the Fushimi-no-miya family residence in the Kioicho district of Tokyo (and before that, the residence of samurai lord Katō Kiyomasa). The 1,085-room hotel was built in seventeen months using a number of techniques that were revolutionary in Japan at the time, such as curtain walls and prefabricated unit bathrooms. The 400-year-old garden on the site was retained as part of the hotel. The hotel was first announced under a management contract with Sheraton Hotels as the Otani-Sheraton Hotel. However, by the time of its completion, the arrangement was no longer in place, (Note: The New Otani would later be part of an unrelated reservations arrangement with Sheraton from 1971–1992, under which it was marketed as The New Otani, a Sheraton Referral Hotel.) and the hotel opened as The New Otani on 1 September 1964, to coincide with the Olympics the following month.

The New Otani was the tallest building in Tokyo from 1964 until 1968, when the Kasumigaseki Building was completed. It took on an iconic status during this period, particularly for its unique revolving restaurant on the highest floor. During this time, the building was a filming location for the 1967 James Bond film You Only Live Twice, where it appeared as the headquarters of Osato Chemical & Engineering Co Ltd, the Japanese front for Ernst Stavro Blofeld's SPECTRE organisation. The New Otani was greatly expanded in 1974, when the 40-storey Garden Tower opened. A third building, the 30-storey Garden Court office tower, opened in 1991. The original 1964 building, today referred to as "The Main", was extensively renovated and remodelled in 2007, when it was given a modern glass facade.

In a reference to the three Edo era branch houses of the Tokugawa clan, the Imperial Hotel, the Hotel Okura Tokyo, and the Hotel New Otani Tokyo are often referred to as one of the Three Great Hotels (御三家, gosanke) of Tokyo.

== Notable guests ==
The hotel assumed operation of the Akasaka Palace, the Japanese State Guest House, in 1976. The palace and the hotel were the main venues of the 5th G7 summit in 1979, the 12th G7 summit in 1986, and the 19th G7 summit in 1993. The New Otani also hosted the world leaders who attended the funeral of Emperor Hirohito in 1989, the enthronement of Emperor Akihito in 1990, and the enthronement of Emperor Naruhito in 2019.

Among its other notable guests are The Supremes, Josip Broz Tito, U.S. President Bill Clinton, Hungarian President Árpád Göncz, King Harald V of Norway, Prime Minister Tony Blair, Russian President Vladimir Putin, Vietnamese President Nguyễn Minh Triết, Chinese Premier Wen Jiabao, Chinese President Hu Jintao, Canadian Prime Minister Stephen Harper and UK Prime Minister Theresa May.

== Images ==
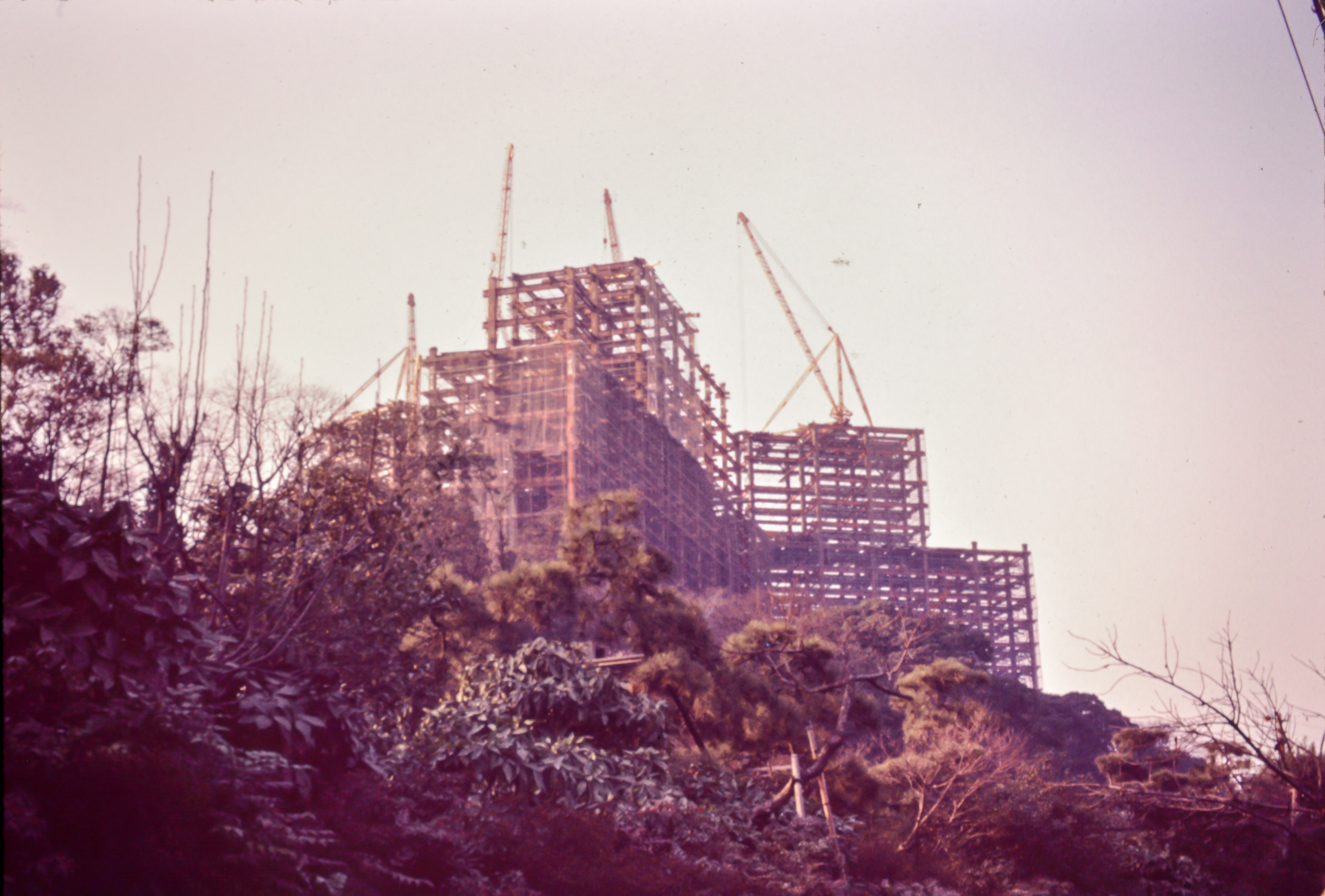
During construction, 1963

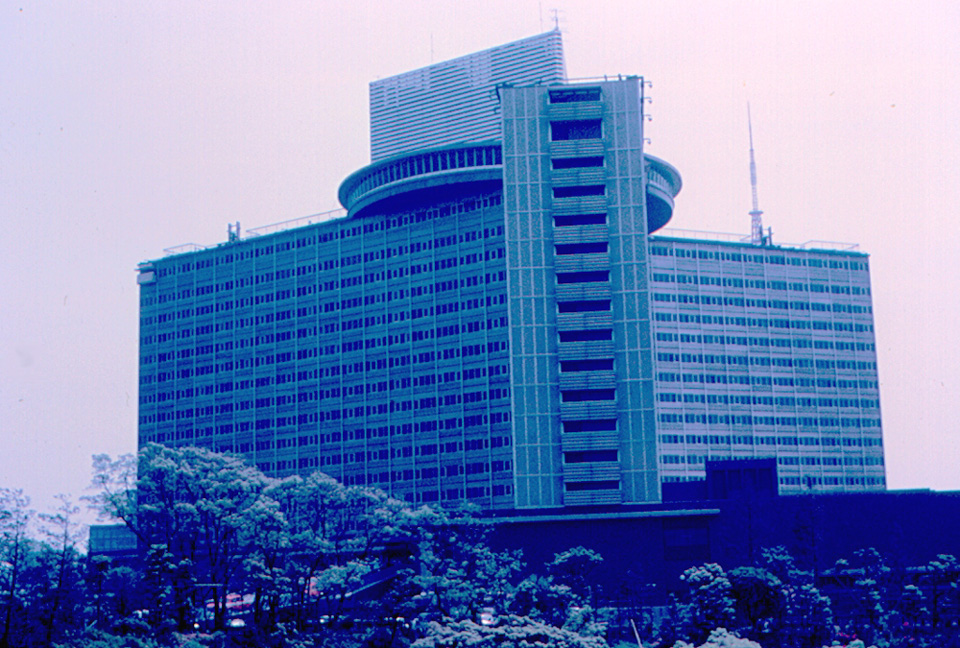
In 1967, showing original pre-2007 exterior

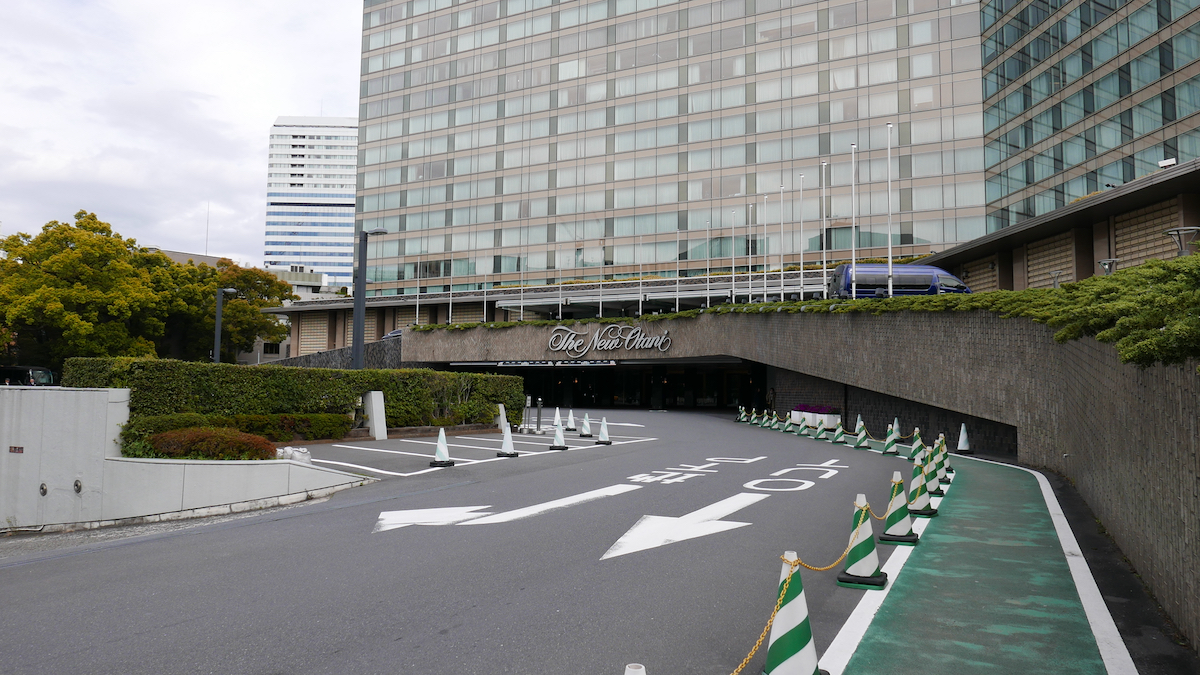
Banquet-level entrance, backdrop in 'You Only Live Twice', 2019

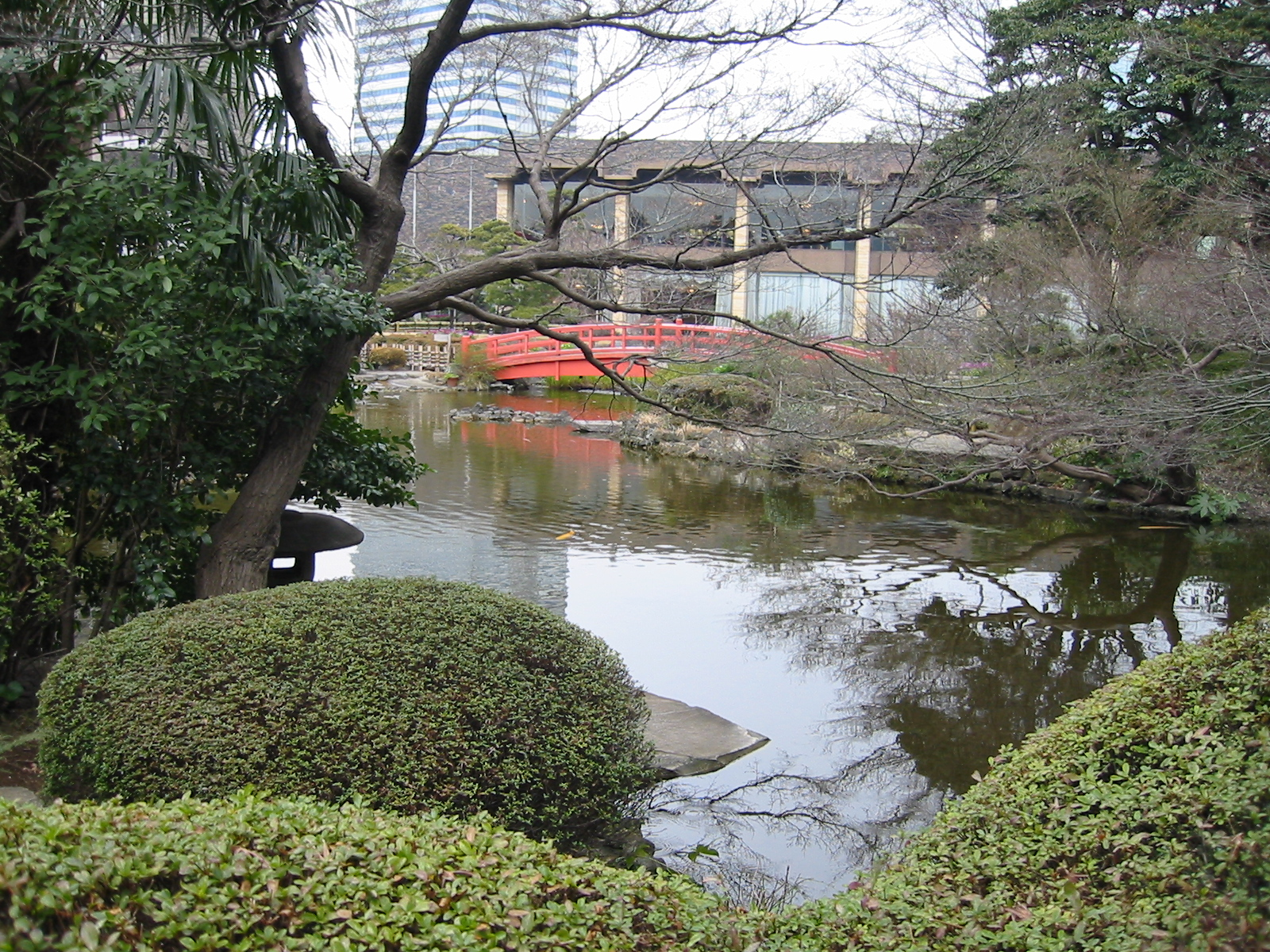
Historic Japanese garden on hotel grounds, 2005

Hotel New Otani Post Office, 2026

== Notes ==
Records
| Preceded by National Diet Building | Tallest building in Japan; 65 m (215 ft); 1964–1968 | Succeeded by Kasumigaseki Building |
| Preceded by National Diet Building | Tallest building in Tokyo; 65 m (215 ft); 1964–1968 | Succeeded by Kasumigaseki Building |
