= Capital Fort =

Office building in Sofia, Bulgaria

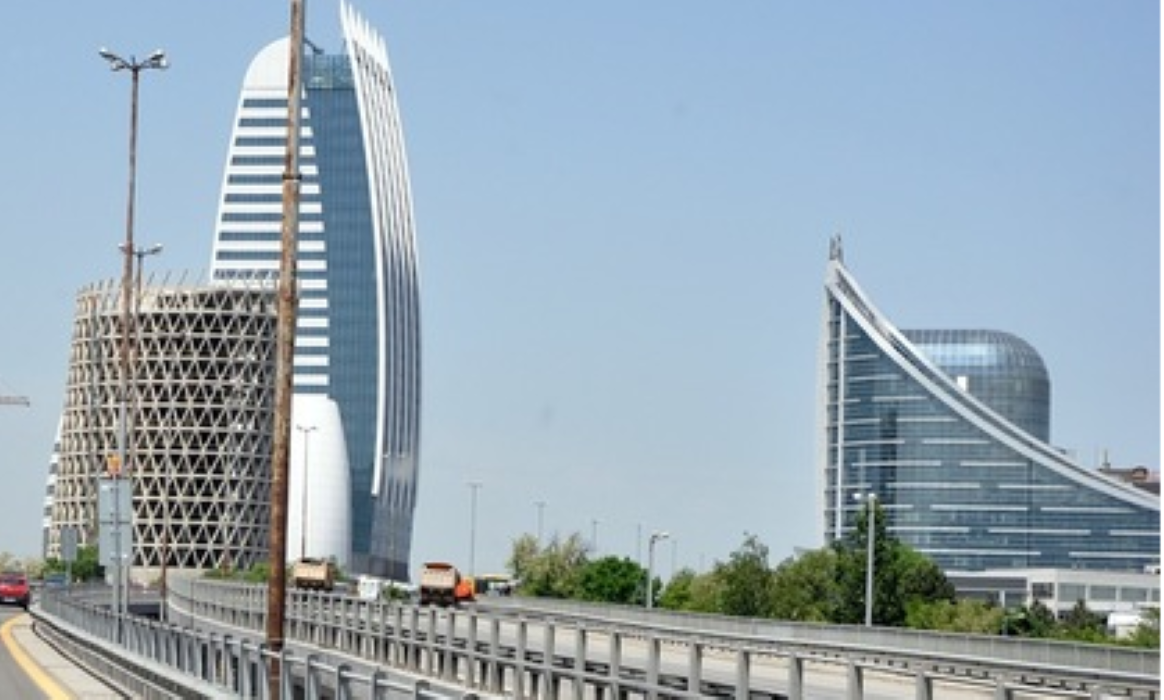

General information
- Location: Sofia, Bulgaria
- Coordinates: 42.6464°N 23.3958°E
- Construction started: 2010
- Opening: November 2015
- Cost: €60 million
- Owner: Variant Sofia Group

Height
- Roof: 126 m (413 ft)

Technical details
- Floor count: 28
- Floor area: 80,000 m^{2} (860,000 sq ft)

Design and construction
- Main contractor: Fort Noks

Website
- www.capitalfort.com?lang=en https://wka.studio/projects/capital-fort/

Capital Fort (Bulgarian: Капитал Форт) Business Center is a Class A office skyscraper building in Sofia. The building is 126 m tall, and was the tallest building in Bulgaria before the construction of Sky Fort which was topped out at 202 m. It has 28 floors and a surface area of 80,000 square metres (860,000 sq ft). The building has two underground floors which serve as parking lots for around 750 cars.

== Location ==
The building is located on Tsarigradsko shose, one of the largest and busiest boulevards in Sofia. Together with Sky Fort, they form the neighborhood of Sofia Skyscraper Center - a cluster of high-rise buildings. The area is serviced by bus lines and the Tsarigradsko shose Metro Station of Sofia Metro.

== Design and construction ==
The concept design of Capital Fort is done by Wright Kuruvilla Architects (WKA) whilst working at Atkins. The local architect of record is "A&A Architects", Sofia, Bulgaria, who have worked on most of the Business Park Sofia buildings. Wright Kuruvilla Architects (WKA) is the international architecture practice behind Burj Al Arab in Dubai led by Tom Wright and Geku Kuruvilla George. As a result Capital Fort shares most of the external looks with its distinctive predecessor (itself completed in 1999). Capital Fort is developed by Fort Noks, the company behind 500 000 m² built-up area of Black Sea resort developments in the last decade. Construction began on 29.01.2010 and the edifice was topped out by 2012. Estimated value was between €60 and €80 million.

== Interior ==
This mixed use building (Office, Retail & Conference Facility) comprises a high-rise office building and a L-shaped low-rise office building that both sit over a podium, which houses a wide range of retail and conference facilities, accessed through a grand atrium lobby. Offices use 24 of building's floors. Superior equipment and installations include 12 high-speed lifts in the high body, advanced HVAC technology and a building management system, covering climate control, security, fire protection and safety.

== Class A ==
Building Owners and Managers Association (BOMA) defines three categories of office buildings - namely Class A, Class B, and Class C. Since the number of parking spaces is 717, Capital Fort does not cover the standard for a Class A office building. Requirement is a parking space for each 100 m² of gross floor area (GFA) The gross floor area of the building is 80 795 m², which requires 808 parking spaces for Class A - 91 more than the currently available ones. Other source points out just 40 000 m² of (probable) GFA, since "efficient open-space" of 1 150 m² a floor (cited there as well) gives a total of 32 200 m², in which case Capital Fort covers Class A requirements, regarding parking spaces. The building is not purely an office one, having retail and conference functions as well.

== See also ==
- List of tallest buildings in Sofia
- List of tallest buildings in Bulgaria
- List of tallest structures in Bulgaria
- List of tallest buildings in Europe
- List of tallest buildings in Southeast Europe
