= List of tallest buildings in South America =

South America has historically seen a relatively modest demand for skyscrapers, with the majority of its tallest buildings being residential. Office buildings have not historically been built taller than residential buildings in the region, though this scenario may well change in the next decades, as South America has been experiencing substantial economic growth.

Most of the continent's high-rises are in Argentina, Brazil, Chile, Colombia and Venezuela, with the tallest buildings being located in Buenos Aires, São Paulo, Balneário Camboriú, Santiago, Bogotá, Cartagena, and Caracas, all of which (except Balneário Camboriú) are one of the biggest financial centres of these countries.

== History ==
The first skyscrapers of at least 100 metres (330 ft) height in South America were built in the 1920s, and included the Martinelli Building in São Paulo, Palacio Barolo in Buenos Aires, and the Palacio Salvo in Montevideo. Martinelli was not only the first, but the tallest skyscraper of South America until being surpassed by the Altino Arantes Building, also in São Paulo, in 1947.

Many of the tallest buildings in South America are located in central business districts that emerged as early as the 19th century, or in office parks developed during the second half of the 20th century. Some of the most notable include Catalinas Norte and Puerto Madero (Buenos Aires); along the Centro Empresarial Nações Unidas and the Central Zone of São Paulo (São Paulo); Sanhattan (Santiago); and Parque Central Complex (Caracas).

== Tallest buildings ==
Was South America's tallest building upon completion

Rank	Name	Image	Location	Country	Height m / (ft)	Floors	Year	Notes
1	Gran Torre Santiago		Santiago	Chile	300 m (984 ft)	62	2014	Tallest building in Chile and South America; first supertall building to be constructed in South America; second tallest building in Latin America (behind Mexico's T.Op Torre 1); fifth tallest building in the Southern Hemisphere (behind Indonesia's Autograph Tower and Luminary Tower, and Australia's Q1 Tower and Australia 108).
2=	Yachthouse Residence Club (Tower 1)		Balneário Camboriú	Brazil	294 m (965 ft)	81	2023	tallest buildings in Brazil.
2=	Yachthouse Residence Club (Tower 2)		Balneário Camboriú	Brazil	294 m (965 ft)	81	2023	tallest buildings in Brazil.
4	One Tower		Balneário Camboriú	Brazil	290 m (951 ft)	84	2022	
5	Boreal Tower		Balneário Camboriú	Brazil	241 m (791 ft)	55	2025	
6	Alvear Tower		Buenos Aires	Argentina	239 m (784 ft)	54	2017	tallest building in Argentina.
7	Infinity Coast		Balneário Camboriú	Brazil	235 m (771 ft)	66	2019	
8	Parque Central Complex (West Tower)		Caracas	Venezuela	225 m (738 ft)	56	1979	tallest building in Venezuela; tallest building in South America from 1979 until 2014.
9	BD Bacatá (South Tower)		Bogotá	Colombia	216 m (709 ft)	67	2015	tallest building in Colombia.
10	Epic Tower		Balneário Camboriú	Brazil	209 m (686 ft)	55	2020	
11	Estelar Hotel		Cartagena	Colombia	202 m (663 ft)	52	2017	
12	Torres Atrio (South Tower)		Bogotá	Colombia	200 m (656 ft)	44	2019	
13	Torre Colpatria		Bogotá	Colombia	196 m (643 ft)	50	1978	tallest building in South America from 1978 until 1979.
14	Titanium La Portada		Santiago	Chile	194 m (636 ft)	55	2010	
15	Centro de Comercio Internacional		Bogotá	Colombia	192 m (630 ft)	50	1977	Tallest building in South America from 1977 until 1978.
16	Harbour Tower		Buenos Aires	Argentina	192 m (630 ft)	53	2026	Tallest residential building in Argentina.
17	Orion Complex		Goiânia	Brazil	191 m (627 ft)	50	2018	
18	Centro Financiero Confinanzas		Caracas	Venezuela	190 m (623 ft)	45	1994	
19=	Plaza Bocagrande		Cartagena	Colombia	190 (620)	44	2017	
19=	Museo Parque Central		Bogotá	Colombia	185 m (607 ft)	45	2017	
20=	Tour Geneve		João Pessoa	Brazil	183 m (600 ft)	51	2018	
20=	Cali Tower		Cali	Colombia	183 m (600 ft)	46	1984	
22	Green Tower		La Paz	Bolivia	181.7 m (596 ft)	40	2022	tallest building in Bolivia.
23	Mercantil Tower		Caracas	Venezuela	179 m (587 ft)	40	1984	
24	Millennium Palace Camboriú		Balneário Camboriú	Brazil	177 m (581 ft)	46	2014	
25=	Coltejer Building		Medellín	Colombia	175 m (574 ft)	37	1972	tallest building in South America from 1972 until 1977.
25=	The Icon		Barranquilla	Colombia	175 m (574 ft)	41	2021	
27	Kingdom Park Vaca Brava		Goiânia	Brazil	173 m (568 ft)	44	2022	
28=	North Point Torre E		Bogotá	Colombia	172 m (564 ft)	45	2017	
28=	Torre Cavia		Buenos Aires	Argentina	172 m (564 ft)	45	2009	
28=	Concórdia Corporate		Nova Lima	Brazil	172 m (564 ft)	44	2018	
28=	Petra Tower		Asunción	Paraguay	172 m (564 ft)	44	2025	tallest building in Paraguay.
28=	Platina 220		São Paulo	Brazil	172 m (564 ft)	40	2022	
33	Ciudadela San Martín Torre Norte		Bogotá	Colombia	171 m (561 ft)	47	1983	
34=	Mirante do Vale		São Paulo	Brazil	170 m (558 ft)	51	1960	tallest building in South America from 1960 until 1972.
34=	Grand Bay Club		Cartagena	Colombia	170 m (558 ft)	43	2009	
36	Figueira Altos do Tatuapé		São Paulo	Brazil	168 m (551 ft)	52	2021	
37	Edifício Itália		São Paulo	Brazil	165 m (541 ft)	45	1965	
38=	Rio Sul Center		Rio de Janeiro	Brazil	164 m (538 ft)	40	1982	
38=	Villa Serena Home Club		Balneário Camboriú	Brazil	164 m (538 ft)	46	2013	
40	Majestic Building		Bucaramanga	Colombia	163 m (535 ft)	42	2015	
41	Mirage 57		Barranquilla	Colombia	162 m (531 ft)	43	2016	
42=	Altino Arantes Building		São Paulo	Brazil	161 m (528 ft)	36	1947	tallest building in South America from 1947 until 1960.
42=	Avianca Building		Bogotá	Colombia	161 m (528 ft)	41	1969	
42=	Mulieris Towers		Buenos Aires	Argentina	161 m (528 ft)	44	2008	
45=	El Faro Towers		Buenos Aires	Argentina	160 m (525 ft)	46	2005	
45=	Torre del Café		Medellín	Colombia	160 m (525 ft)	36	1975	
45=	Palmetto		Cartagena	Colombia	160 m (525 ft)	42	2009	
45=	Repsol-YPF Tower		Buenos Aires	Argentina	160 m (525 ft)	36	2008	
49	Provincial Tower		Caracas	Venezuela	159 m (522 ft)	40	1984	
50=	Le Parc Tower		Buenos Aires	Argentina	158 m (518 ft)	51	1995	
50=	Torre Norte		São Paulo	Brazil	158 m (518 ft)	38	1999	
50=	Parque Cidade Jardim		São Paulo	Brazil	158 m (518 ft)	41	2010	
50=	Brookfield Towers (Tower A)		São Paulo	Brazil	158 m (518 ft)	47	2013	
54	Telecommunications Tower		Montevideo	Uruguay	157 m (515 ft)	35	2002	tallest building in Uruguay.
55	Palmetto Eliptic		Cartagena	Colombia	156 m (512 ft)	41	2011	
56=	Château Puerto Madero		Buenos Aires	Argentina	155 m (509 ft)	50	2010	
56=	BBVA Tower		Buenos Aires	Argentina	155 m (509 ft)	33	2017	
58=	Mansão Margarida Costa Pinto		Salvador	Brazil	154 m (505 ft)	43	2008	
58=	San Martín Torre Norte		Bogotá	Colombia	154 m (505 ft)	40	1970	
60=	Grattacielo Building		Barranquilla	Colombia	153 m (502 ft)	39	2014	
60=	Centro Financiero Latino		Caracas	Venezuela	153 m (502 ft)	32	1978	
62	Universe Life Square		Curitiba	Brazil	152 m (499 ft)	45	2014	
63=	Go Green Building		Bucaramanga	Colombia	150 m (492 ft)	38	2015	
63=	CAF Tower		Caracas	Venezuela	150 m (492 ft)	40	2014	
63=	Intercontinental Hotel (Isla Multiespacio Complex)		Valencia	Venezuela	150 m (492 ft)	40	2014	
63=	Torres del Poeta		La Paz	Bolivia	150 m (492 ft)	36	2018	
63=	Girasoles Tower		La Paz	Bolivia	150 m (492 ft)	40	2013	
63=	North Point Krystal Tower		Bogotá	Colombia	150 m (492 ft)	35	2015	
69	Birmann 21		São Paulo	Brazil	149 m (489 ft)	24	1996	
70=	Premier Vision		Goiânia	Brazil	148 m (486 ft)	47	2005	
70=	E-Tower		São Paulo	Brazil	148 m (486 ft)	37	2005	
72=	Infinitum Cartagena	Residential Tower in Cartagena, Colombia	Cartagena	Colombia	145 m (476 ft)	39	2018	
72=	Sede do BankBoston		São Paulo	Brazil	145 m (476 ft)	35	2002	
72=	Building of the Comptroller General of Colombia		Bogotá	Colombia	145 m (476 ft)	32	1974	
72=	Galicia Central Tower		Buenos Aires	Argentina	145 m (476 ft)	33	2007	
72=	Le Parc Puerto Madero		Buenos Aires	Argentina	145 m (476 ft)	37	2007	
72=	Iluminata Tower		Barranquilla	Colombia	145 m (476 ft)	36	2016	
78=	Torre Telefónica Chile		Santiago	Chile	143 m (469 ft)	33	1996	
78=	Banco do Brasil Building		São Paulo	Brazil	143 m (469 ft)	24	1955	
78=	105 Lélio Gama St.		Rio de Janeiro	Brazil	143 m (469 ft)	40	1980	
81	Solara Towers		Barranquilla	Colombia	142 m (466 ft)	36	2015	
82=	Alas Building		Buenos Aires	Argentina	141 m (463 ft)	41	1957	
82=	Eldorado Business Tower		São Paulo	Brazil	141 m (463 ft)	36	2007	
84=	Torre Banco de la Nación		Lima	Peru	140 m (459 ft)	30	2015	tallest building in Peru.
84=	Torres Maui		Rosario	Argentina	140 m (459 ft)	44	2014	
84=	World Trade Center Montevideo (Tower 4)		Montevideo	Uruguay	140 m (459 ft)	40	2013	
84=	Torre Allianz		Bogotá	Colombia	140 m (459 ft)	36	1996	
84=	Edificio Horizontes		Cartagena	Colombia	140 m (459 ft)	37	2007	
84=	Fonade Tower		Bogotá	Colombia	140 m (459 ft)	37	1974	
84=	Edificio de la Contraloría		Bogotá	Colombia	140 m (459 ft)	36	1974	
84=	BankBoston Tower		Buenos Aires	Argentina	140 m (459 ft)	33	2001	
84=	Libertador 4444		Buenos Aires	Argentina	140 m (459 ft)	46	1995	
84=	Evolution Corporate		São Paulo	Brazil	140 m (459 ft)	35	2014	
94	Plaza Centenário		São Paulo	Brazil	139 m (456 ft)	32	1995	
95=	Mirante João Olímpio Filho		Natal	Brazil	138 m (453 ft)	43	2009	
96=	Torre Girasoles		La Paz	Bolivia	138 m (453 ft)	38	2013	
97=	Edificio Banco Continental		Lima	Peru	137 m (449 ft)	20	1978	
97=	Mandarim Building		São Paulo	Brazil	137 m (449 ft)	42	2006	
97=	Bellini Esmeralda Plaza San Martín		Buenos Aires	Argentina	137 m (449 ft)	45	2015	
100=	The Point Tower		Guayaquil	Ecuador	136 m (446 ft)	36	2013	tallest building in Ecuador.
100=	Icono Tower		Asunción	Paraguay	136 m (446 ft)	37	2011	
100=	Torre Renoir I		Buenos Aires	Argentina	136 m (446 ft)	41	2008	
100=	Dolfines Guaraní		Rosario	Argentina	136 m (446 ft)	45	2009	
104	Mirador Playa Brava Torre 1		Iquique	Chile	135.7 m (445 ft)	37	2015	
105=	Torres del Yacht		Buenos Aires	Argentina	135 m (443 ft)	45	2014	
106=	Mundo Plaza		Salvador	Brazil	135 m (443 ft)	41	2010	
106=	Torre Lapacho		Asunción	Paraguay	135 m (443 ft)	35	2022	
106=	Edificio La Previsora		Guayaquil	Ecuador	135 m (443 ft)	35	1991	
109	Metrópolis		Balneário Camboriú	Brazil	134 m (440 ft)	40	2010	
110=	Edificio Corficolombiana		Cali	Colombia	133 m (436 ft)	32	1974	
110=	Barão de Iguape Building		São Paulo	Brazil	133 m (436 ft)	37	1959	
110=	Château Libertador Residence		Buenos Aires	Argentina	133 m (436 ft)	40	2008	
113=	Madero Office Tower		Buenos Aires	Argentina	131 m (430 ft)	27	2011	
113=	City U		Bogotá	Colombia	131 m (430 ft)	32	2016	
113=	Píer Maurício de Nassau		Recife	Brazil	131 m (430 ft)	42	2009	
116	Hotel Marriott Santiago		Santiago	Chile	130 m (427 ft)	42	1999	

== See also ==
- List of tallest buildings in the Southern Hemisphere
- List of tallest buildings in Argentina
- List of tallest buildings in Bolivia
- List of tallest buildings in Brazil
- List of tallest buildings in Chile
- List of tallest buildings in Colombia
- List of tallest buildings in Ecuador
- List of tallest buildings in Paraguay
- List of tallest buildings in Peru
- List of tallest buildings in Uruguay
- List of tallest buildings in Venezuela
- List of tallest buildings in Latin America
