= List of tallest buildings in Colombia =

This list of tallest buildings in Colombia ranks skyscrapers in Colombia by height. This lists ranks Colombia skyscrapers that stand at least 150 metres (492 feet) tall, based on standard height measurement. This includes spires and architectural details but does not include antenna masts.

The new current tallest building in Bogotá is the BD Bacatá, On June 2, 2015, it became taller than Torre Colpatria, which held the title of the tallest building in Colombia since 1979. When finished, the BD Bacatá is expected to be 216 meters (709 ft) tall.

== Completed ==
Was the tallest building in Colombia upon completion

Rank	Name	Image	Location	Height m (ft)	Floors	Year	Notes
1	BD Bacatá (South Tower)		Bogotá	216 (709)	67	2016	
2	Hotel Estelar		Cartagena	202 (663)	52	2016	
3	Torres Atrio (North Tower)		Bogotá	201 (659)	44	2019	
4	Torre Colpatria		Bogotá	196 (643)	48	1979	
5	Centro de Comercio Internacional		Bogotá	192 (630)	50	1974	
6	Plaza Bocagrande		Cartagena	190 (620)	44	2017	
7	Museo de Parque Central (Tower 2)		Bogotá	185 (607)	44	2017	
8	Cali Tower		Cali	183.5 (602)	46	1980	
9	The Icon		Barranquilla	175 (574)	42	2021	
10	Coltejer Building		Medellín	175 (574)	36	1972	
11	North Point Torre E		Bogotá	172 (564)	46	2017	
12	Ciudadela San Martín (North Tower)		Bogotá	171 (561)	42	1983	
13	Grand Bay Club		Cartagena	170 (560)	44	2010	
14	BD Bacatá (North Tower)		Bogotá	167 (548)	56	2016	
15	Edificio Majestic		Bucaramanga	163 (535)	42	2015	
16	Mirage 57		Barranquilla	162 (531)	43	2016	
17	Avianca Building		Bogotá	161 (528)	41	1969	
18	Torre del Café		Medellín	160 (520)	36	1975	
19	Palmetto Elliptic		Cartagena	156 (512)	41	2011	
20	Ciudadela San Martín (South Tower)		Bogotá	154 (505)	40	1983	
21	Grattacielo Building		Barranquilla	153 (502)	39	2014	
22	América		Bogotá	150 (490)	32	2019	
23	Torre Green		Bucaramanga	150 (490)	38	2015	
24	Torre Krystal		Bogotá	150 (490)	38	2015	

== Timeline of tallest buildings ==
Name	City	Years as tallest	Height m (ft)	Floors	Notes
Avianca Building	Bogotá	1969-1972 (3 years)	161 (528)	42	
Coltejer Building	Medellín	1972-1974 (2 years)	175 (574)	36	
Centro de Comercio Internacional	Bogotá	1974-1979 (5 years)	192 (630)	50	
Torre Colpatria	Bogotá	1979-2007 (28 years)	196 (643)	48	
Torre de la Escollera	Cartagena	2007-2007 (0 years)	206 (676)	58	Demolished in 2007.
Torre Colpatria	Bogotá	2007-2016 (9 years)	196 (643)	48	
BD Bacatá (South Tower)	Bogotá	2016–present (10 years)	216 (709)	67	
