= Torre del Café =

- Coffee Tower
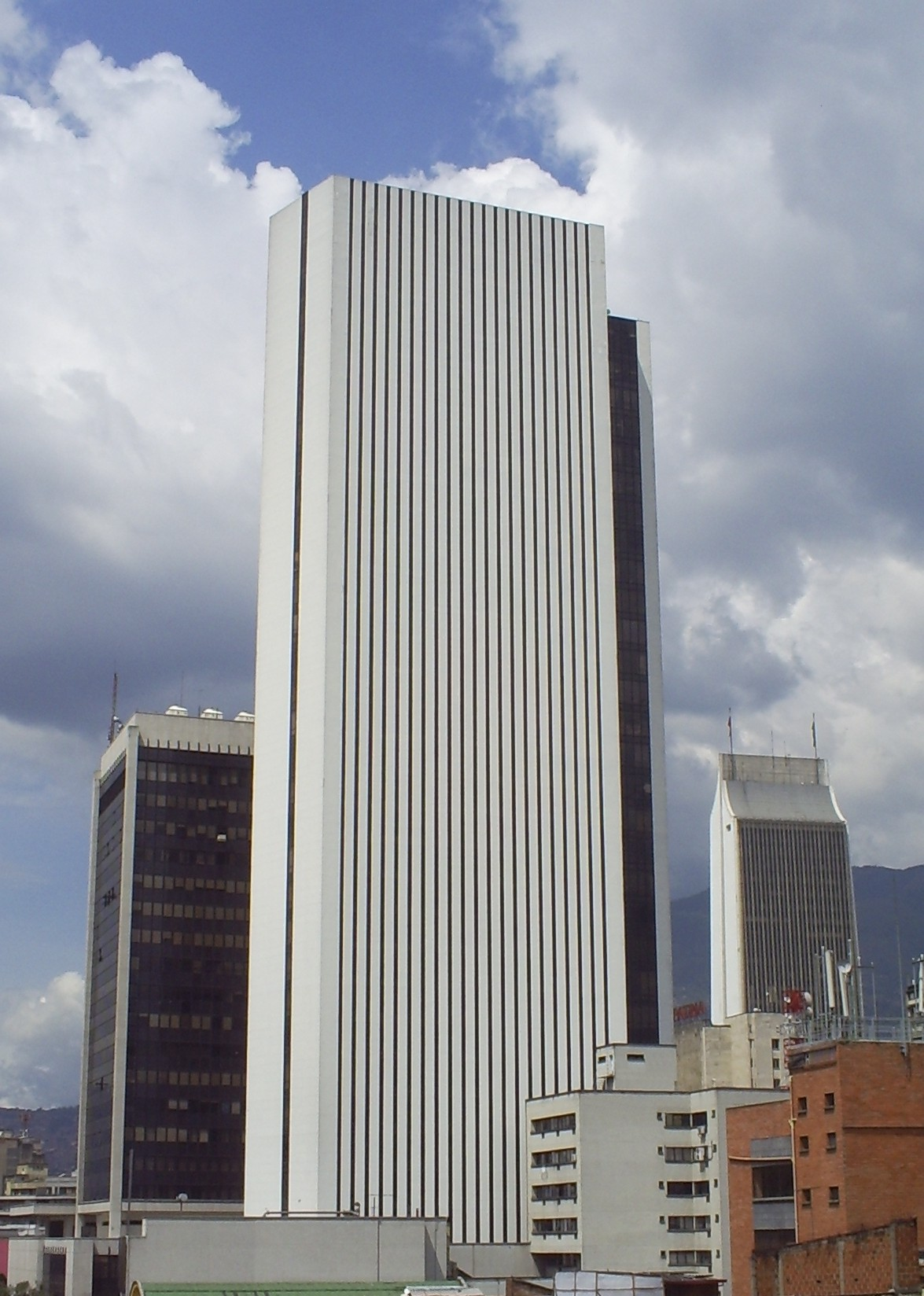
- The Torre del Café in Medellín, Colombia.

- Location within Colombia

General information
- Status: Completed
- Type: Commercial office
- Location: Medellín, Colombia
- Coordinates: 6°14′41.38″N 75°33′57.78″W
- Completed: 1975

Height
- Height: 160 m (525 ft)

Technical details
- Floor count: 36

Torre del Café (English: Coffee Tower), also known as Edificio del Café (English: Coffee Building), is a 36-storey high-rise commercial office skyscraper in the city municipality of Medellín, Colombia. Although the starting date of its construction is unknown, the Torre del Café was completed in 1975. Torre del Café is 160 metres (520 ft) high. Torre del Café has 36 floors, with a roof height of 520 feet (160 m), making it the second-tallest skyscraper in Medellín after the 175-metre-high (574 ft) skyscraper, the Torre Coltejer, and the tenth-tallest in Colombia.

== See also ==
- Cali Tower
- Coltejer Building
- Torre Colpatria
- Centro de Comercio Internacional
- Medellín
