= Museo Parque Central =

Mixed-use skyscraper in Bogotá, Colombia

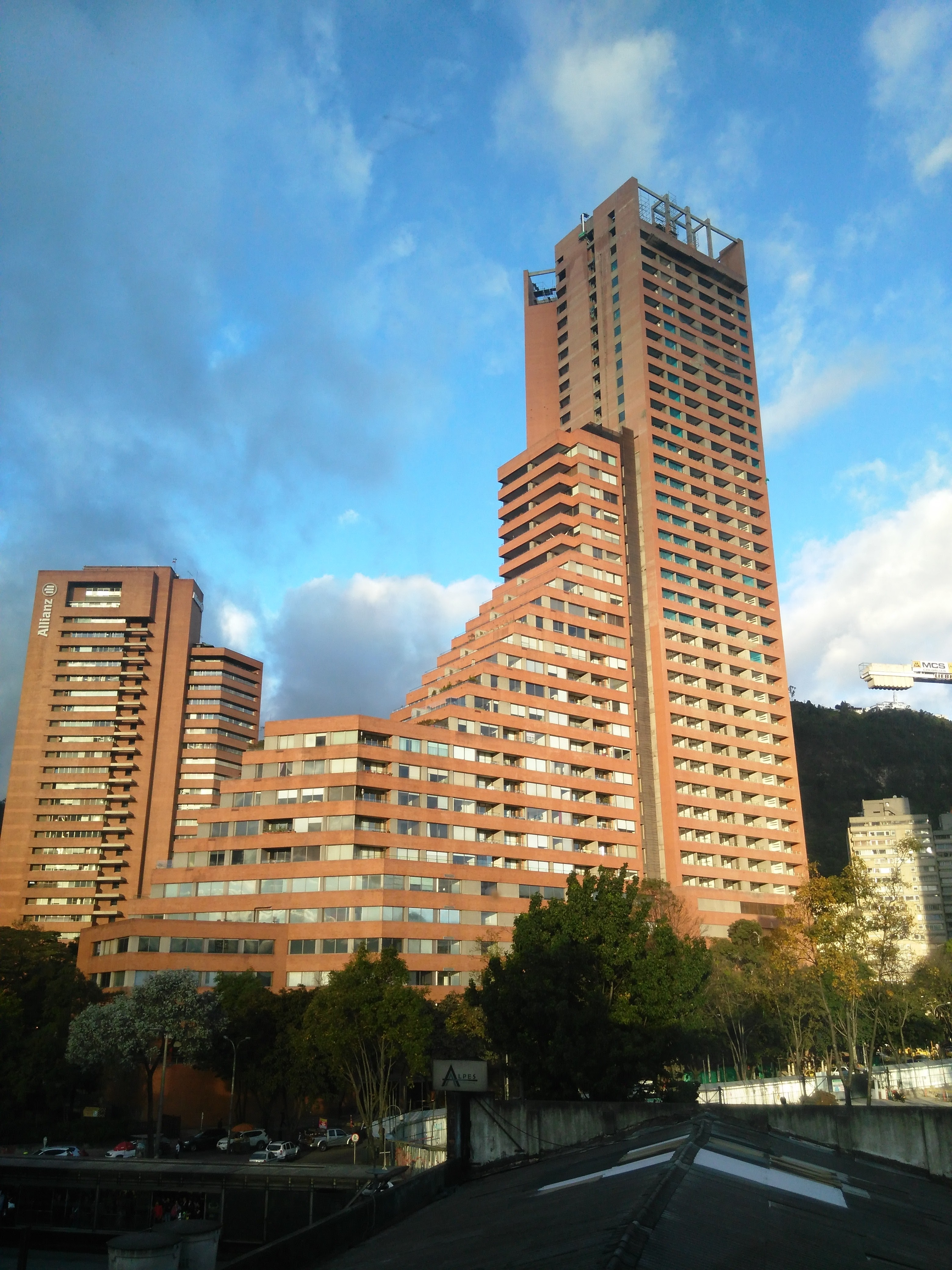
- Interactive map of the Museo Parque Central area

General information
- Status: Completed
- Type: Mixed-use: Residential / Office
- Location: Bogotá, Colombia, Cra. 13a #28-21, Bogotá, Colombia
- Coordinates: 4.61639°N 74.07091°W
- Construction started: 2016
- Completed: 2018

Height
- Roof: 185 m (607 ft)

Technical details
- Structural system: Concrete
- Floor count: 45
- Lifts/elevators: 6

Design and construction
- Architects: Caleo (María Teresa León & Guillermo Carreño Saldarriaga)

Museo Parque Central also known as Torre 2 Edificio Parque Central is a mixed-use skyscraper in Bogotá, Colombia. Built between 2016 and 2018, the tower stands at 185 m (607 ft) tall with 45 floors and is the current 7th tallest building in Colombia.

== History ==
=== Architecture ===
The Parque Central Bavaria residential project was built between 2009 and 2017. It is located on the north side of the Bogotá International Trade Center, on Calle 28 with Avenida Caracas, next to the Calle 26 station of the TransMilenio mass transit system. It is the fifth tallest building in Bogotá and is part of the Parque Central Bavaria complex.

The building is a neighbor of the traditional Teusaquillo sector and the International Center. It is composed of two structures that have the same name, but were inaugurated several years apart and have different heights. The first was completed in 2009, has 26 floors and is 92 meters high, the second was completed in 2017, has 44 floors and is 185 meters high. The resulting complex has been compared to the Torres del Parque (1970) designed by Rogelio Salmona.

The task was to construct a project on this 5,541 m2 parcel of land that would serve a range of purposes. The outcome is an 83,932 m2 skyscraper featuring 11 retail spaces, 55 workspaces, and 467 residential units in various layouts with distinct outdoor vistas, along with numerous amenities, community areas, and athletic facilities. During the decade of its development, a flexible modular design was created for the floors to easily accommodate any changes in market demand. Using this solution allows for internal modifications to be made without impacting the exterior features such as openings and solids which give the project its unique character.

Thanks to the section completed in 2017, it is the 15th tallest building in South America, the seventh tallest building in Colombia and the fifth in Bogotá.

== See also ==
- List of tallest buildings in South America
- List of tallest buildings in Colombia
