= List of tallest structures in South America =

This is an incomplete list of the tallest (pinnacle height > 200 metres) man-made structures of any kind that exist or existed in South America.

== List ==
Structure	Country	Town	Height (m)	Height (ft)	Year built	Type	Remarks
Trelew Omega Tower	Argentina	Trelew	366 m	1201 ft	1976	Guyed mast	VLF-transmitter, insulated against ground, demolished in 1998
Amazon Tall Tower Observatory	Brazil	150 km NE of Manaus	325 m	1066 ft	2015	Guyed mast	Tower for atmospheric science
Gran Torre Santiago	Chile	Santiago	300 m	984 ft	2013	Skyscraper	
Amazonas Crossing of Tucuruí transmission line	Brazil	Almeirim	295 m	968 ft	2013	Lattice tower (Electricity pylons)	2 towers
Cerro Dominador Solar Thermal Plant	Chile	Santa Elena	252 m	827 ft	2020	Concrete Tower	Concentrated solar power plant tower
Buenos Aires Radio Rivadavia AM Broadcasting Mast	Argentina	Bella Vista	252 m	827 ft	?	Guyed mast	Insulated against ground
CX-6 Radio Mast	Uruguay	Santiago Vázquez	245 m	804 ft	?	Guyed mast	Insulated against ground
Orinoco River Crossing	Venezuela	Caroní	240 m	787 ft	1990	Lattice tower (Electricity pylons)	3 pylons
Santa Fe Canal 13 TV Mast	Argentina	Recreo, Santa Fe	236 m	774 ft	1965	Guyed mast	
Bonaire TWR transmitter	Bonaire	Tera Kora	231.6 m	760 ft	?	Guyed mast	Insulated against ground
Eldorado Do Sul RBS Radio Mast	Brazil	Eldorado Do Sul	230 m	755 ft	1986	Guyed mast	Insulated against ground
Torre Espacial	Argentina	Buenos Aires	228 m	748 ft	1997	Additionally guyed tower	
Parque Central Torre Este	Venezuela	Caracas	225 m	738 ft	1979	Skyscraper	
Parque Central Torre Oeste	Venezuela	Caracas	225 m	738 ft	1984	Skyscraper	
Brasilia TV Tower	Brazil	Brasilia	224 m	735 ft	1967	Lattice tower	
Monte Grande Radio Station, Large Masts	Argentina	Buenos Aires	219 m	719 ft	1924	guyed mast	VLF-transmitter LPZ, 2 masts insulated against ground, demolished
San Juan Radio Colón transmitter	Argentina	San Juan	216 m	709 ft	1942	Guyed mast	
General Pacheco Radio Nacional Radio Masts	Argentina	Buenos Aires	215 m	705 ft	?	Guyed mast	
Torre TV Bandeirantes	Brazil	São Paulo	212 m	696 ft	1995	Lattice tower	
Mast of Radio 10	Argentina	Buenos aires	211 m	693 ft	?	Guyed mast	Insulated against ground
Cali Tower	Colombia	Cali	211 m	689 ft	1997	Skyscraper	
Monte Grande Radio Station, Large Masts	Argentina	Buenos Aires	210 m	689 ft	1924	guyed mast	VLF-transmitter LPZ, 8 masts, demolished
Torre de la Escollera	Colombia	Cartagena	206 m	676 ft	2007	Skyscraper	Never finished, demolished
Rosario Telefe TV Mast	Argentina	Rosarios	202 m	663 ft	2009	Guyed mast	
