= Ciudadela San Martin =

Hotel skyscraper in Bogotá, Colombia

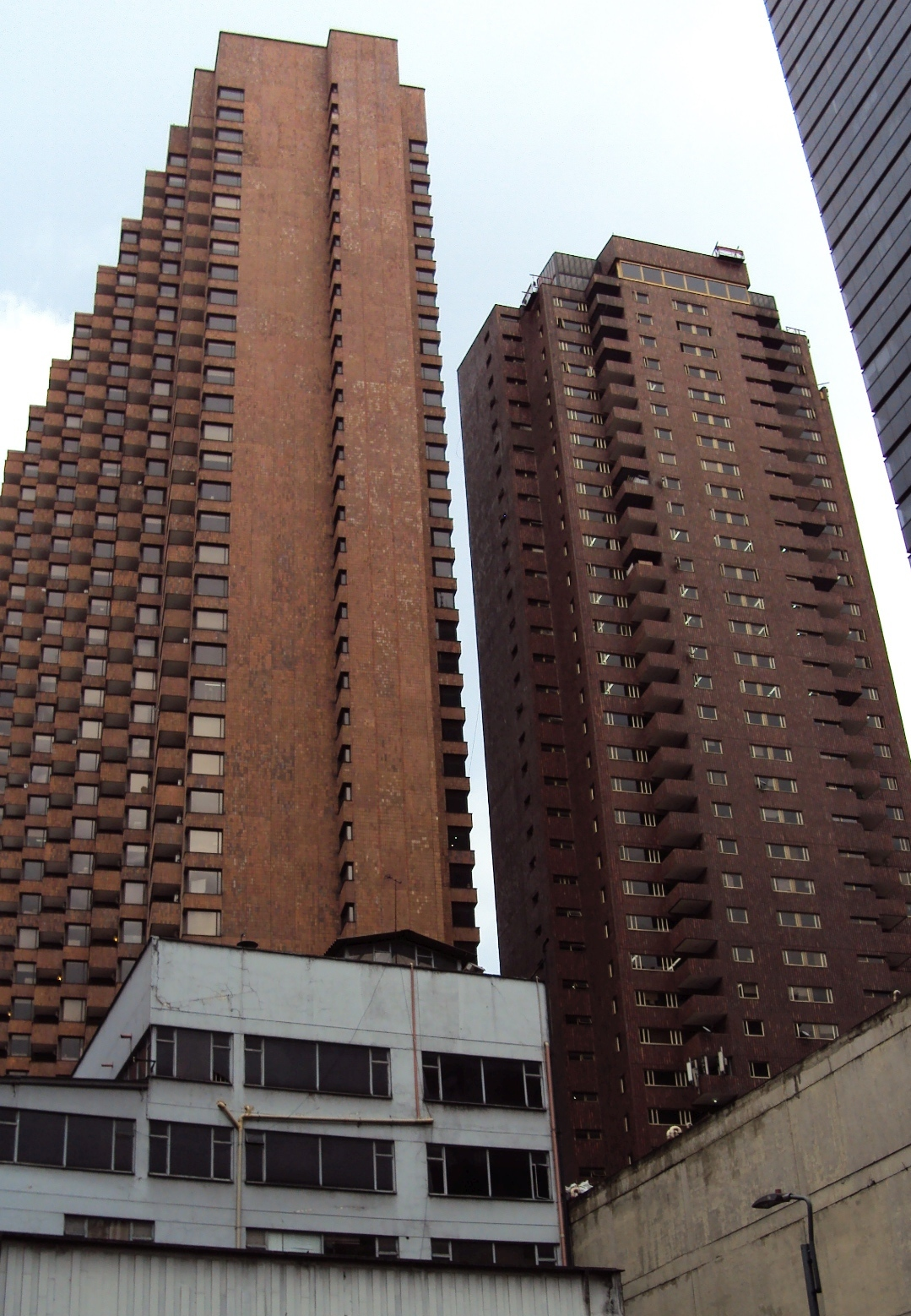
- Interactive map of the Ciudadela San Martin area

General information
- Status: Completed
- Type: Hotel
- Location: Bogotá, Colombia, Cra. 7 #32-34, Bogotá, Colombia
- Coordinates: 4.61930°N 74.06793°W
- Construction started: 1970 (South Tower)
- Completed: 1983 (North Tower)
- Owner: Hilton Hotels & Resorts

Height
- Roof: 171 m (561 ft) (North Tower); 154 m (505 ft) (South Tower)

Technical details
- Structural system: Concrete
- Floor count: 47 (North Tower); 40 (South Tower)

Design and construction
- Architects: N.I. Ripinsky (North Tower); Fernando Martínez Sanabria (South Tower)

Ciudadela San Martin (also known as Hotel Hilton Bogotá) is a hotel skyscraper complex in Bogotá, Colombia. Built between 1970 and 1983, the complex consists of two buildings standing at 171 m (561 ft) with 47 floors (North Tower, also known as Edificio CASUR) respectively 154 m (505 ft) with 40 floors (South Tower, also known as Edificio Orquídea Real), with the taller tower being the current 12th tallest building in Colombia.

== History ==
=== Architecture ===
The building complex is located in the San Martín neighborhood, on the eastern side of the Carrera Séptima boulevard, between streets 32 and 33 A. In its vicinity is the Seguros Fénix Building and in its surroundings are the Bogota National Park, the La Macarena neighborhood and the National Museum of Colombia.

The towers of the complex share some stylistic similarities, such as the use of brick on their facades. But they also have notable physical differences such as the height and the volumetric organization and shape.

The South Tower has 40 floors and is 123 meters high. It was designed in the 1960s by architect Fernando Martínez Sanabria and opened in 1970 under the name "Caja de Sueldos de Reiro de la Policía", as it was intended to make the entity's investments as profitable as possible. Initially, the building was intended to house apartments, but it was soon leased to the Hilton Hotels & Resorts chain, which opened a hotel in 1972. For decades, the property adopted the brand's name and was known as the Hotel Hilton Bogotá.

Construction of the North Tower began in 1980 and was completed in 1983. With 47 floors and 170 meters, it is taller than the South Tower and was designed by the firm NI Ripinsky, which was liquidated after this project.

In 2007, both towers underwent a renovation process. The same year, the San Martín shopping center opened its doors, which has commercial premises, a food court, a gym and a supermarket.

== Gallery ==
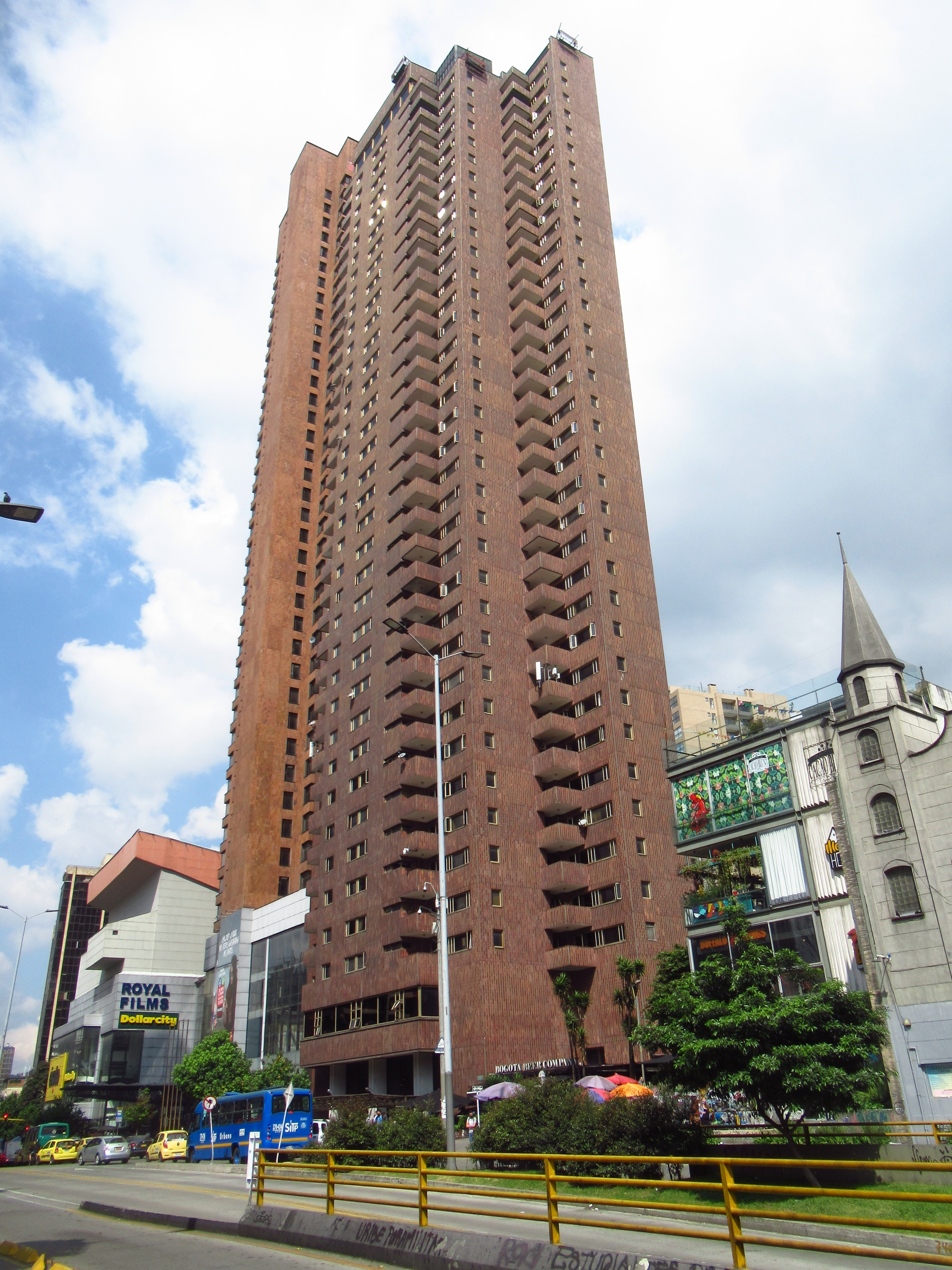
The Northern Tower (Antigua Torre Hilton), bu. 1983

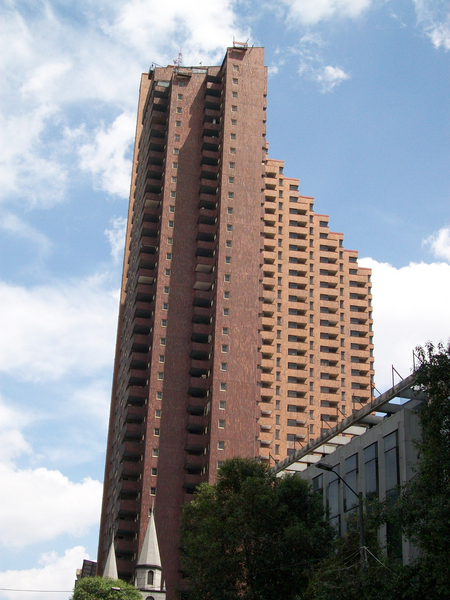
The Southern Tower, bu. 1970

== See also ==
- List of tallest buildings in South America
- List of tallest buildings in Colombia
