= Eldorado Business Tower =

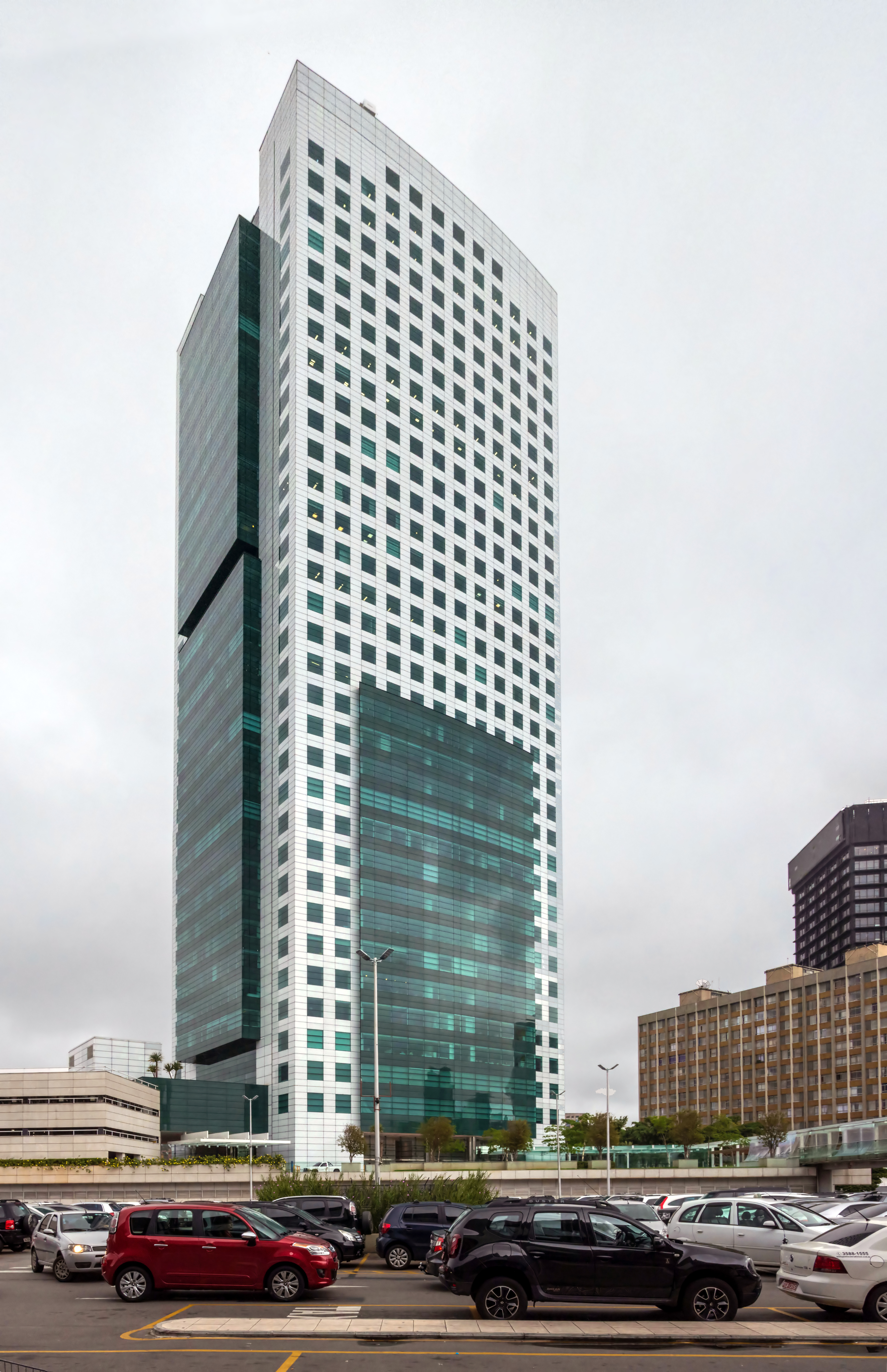
- Eldorado Business Tower from Eldorado Shopping Center.

- Location within São Paulo Location within Brazil

General information
- Type: Office
- Location: São Paulo, SP, Brazil
- Coordinates: 23°34′23″S 46°41′52″W
- Completed: 2007

Height
- Roof: 141 m (463 ft)
- Top floor: 36

Eldorado Business Tower is a 36-story skyscraper in São Paulo, Brazil. Completed in 2007, the 141 meters (462 feet) building is the 45th tallest building in South America, 17th in Brazil. The tower is located near Shopping Eldorado, a shopping center in Pinheiros.

== History ==
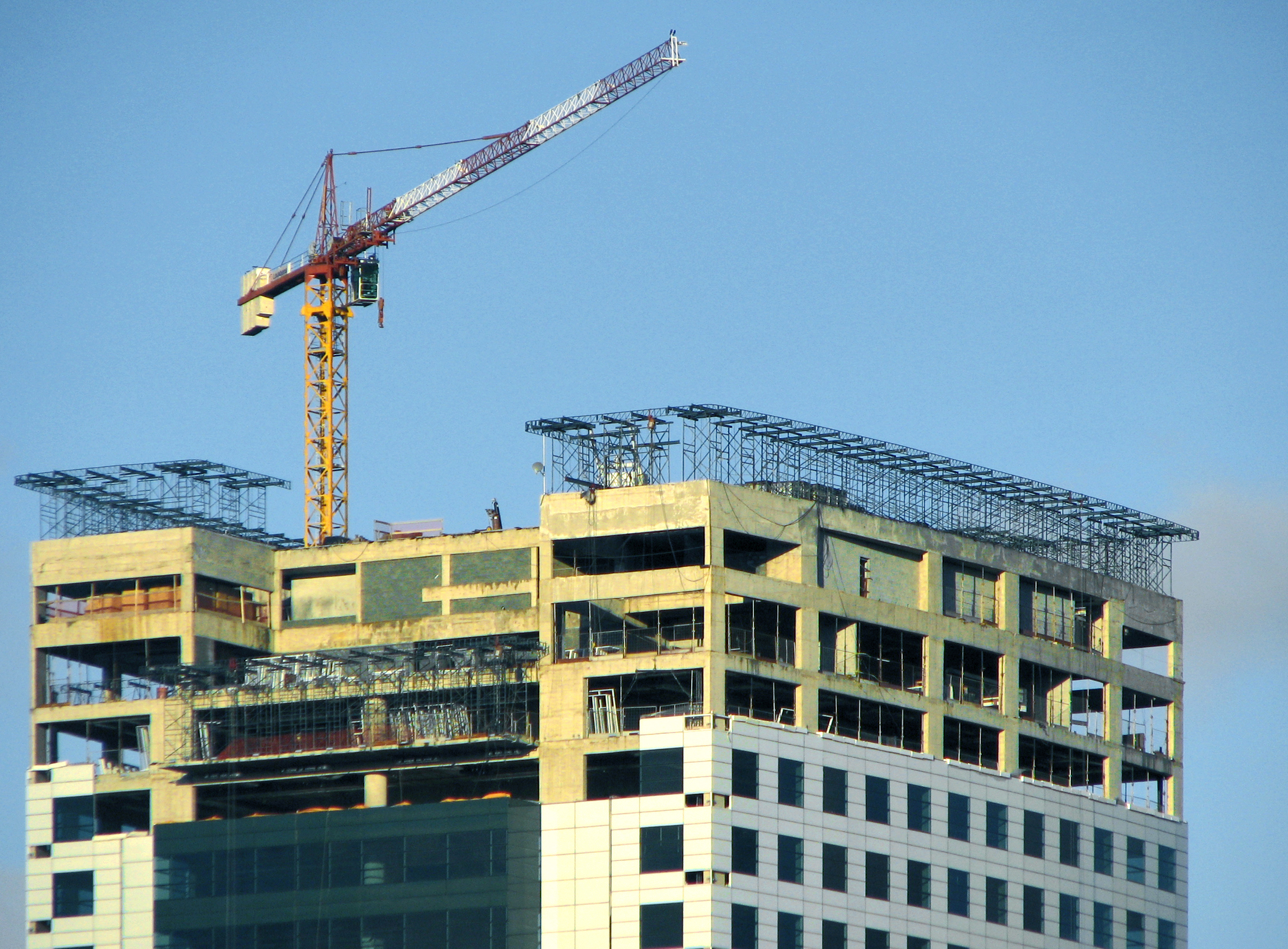
The building near the end of its construction

Eldorado Business Tower has eight parking floors, four below ground and four above ground. There is one parking space for each 32m² of office area. It is connected to Shopping Eldorado by an elevated passway. There is a 24 x 24 m helipad on the roof, capable of receiving aircraft up to 10 tons. Six of the 29 elevators are the fastest in Brazil, reaching speeds of 6 m/s. The tower is composed of a four storey garage building and a 36 storey office tower. The entrance lobby features a 7.1 meter floor to floor height. The municipality granted permission for occupation on October 25, 2007. Eldorado Business Tower was built by one of the leading condominium developers in Brazil. In 2009, it received Platinum LEED certification.

== See also ==
- List of tallest buildings in Brazil
- Mirante do Vale
- Altino Arantes Building
- Edifício Itália
