= The Icon (Barranquilla) =

Skyscraper in Barranquilla, Colombia

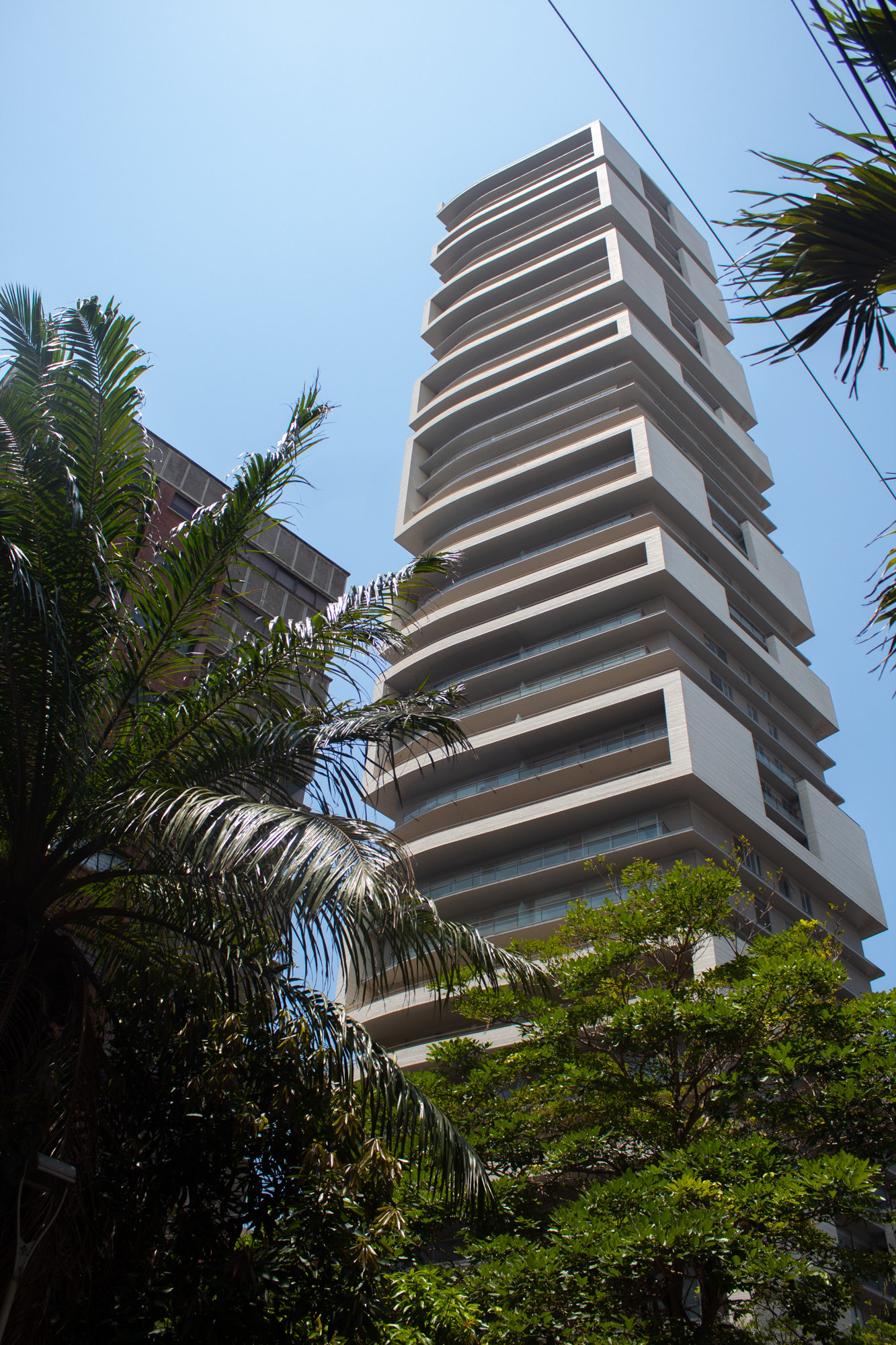

General information
- Status: Completed
- Type: Residential
- Location: Barranquilla, Colombia, Cra. 57 #78–30, Nte. Centro Historico, Barranquilla, Atlántico, Colombia
- Coordinates: 11.00683°N 74.80581°W
- Construction started: 2016
- Completed: December 3, 2021
- Cost: € 35 Million

Height
- Roof: 175 m (574 ft)

Technical details
- Structural system: Reinforced concrete
- Floor count: 41 (+2 underground)

Design and construction
- Architect: TASH Colombia
- Developer: ALC Constructora
- Structural engineer: Berra Ingenieros
- Main contractor: Grupo Rubau

The Icon is a residential skyscraper in the Villa Country district of Barranquilla, Colombia. Built between 2016 and 2021, the tower stands at 175 m (574 ft) tall with 41 floors and is the current 9th tallest building in Colombia.

== History ==
The structure is located in the Villa Country district of Barranquilla, on the boulevard of 78th Street, in the northern area of the city. The total investment of the project raised to €35,000,000. The design of the skyscraper was in charge of the Spanish Tash group and its construction began in mid-2015. The ALC firm is in charge of management and promotion. The Spanish construction company Grupo Rubau took the role of the main contractor in charge of the entire construction process with an execution period of 32 months.

The construction of the skyscraper's foundations took approximately six months, and special bricks imported from Spain were used, made with sand from around the world.

The building has a bioclimatic design that serves to maintain a cool environment and passive solar systems that serve to transform the heat from solar energy.

== Architecture ==
=== Concept ===
The building has a total height of 175 m (574 ft). There are apartment units alongside the circulation and technical spaces, and the social and business areas are 2.7 m (8 ft 10 in) high, between the slabs.

Upon its structural topping, the building surpassed the 162-metre (531 ft) Mirage 57 tower to become the tallest habitable structure in the city of Barranquilla, the third tallest structure in the Caribbean region of Colombia (surpassed by the Hotel Estelar and the Plaza Bocagrande shopping complex, both in the city of Cartagena de Indias), the ninth tallest building in Colombia, one of the 25 tallest in South America and one of the 100 tallest structures in Latin America.

=== Construction ===
The construction of this tower was approved before the implementation of the so-called Territorial Planning Plan (POT), which requires a series of specific standards and requirements for this type of work and/or buildings. The Icon is a reference point and one of the most representative buildings in the city. It was built by the Spanish investors from Grupo Rubau, a company with experience and expertise in the construction of high-rise structures domain.

The tower is located at 78th Street #57-35, on the boulevard of the Villa Country neighborhood, north of the city. For the construction of the foundations, basements and removal of soil, specific work was necessary for 6 months (given the complexity of the work). As for the slabs that were built entirely of reinforced concrete, these are 2.6 m (8 ft 6 in) thick and incorporate micropiles that serve "to collect compression and traction peaks." The process of casting the slab was complex, so much so that 100 workers participated in it, 1,500 m^{3} (53,000 cu ft) of pure concrete were needed and work was done continuously for 36 hours (the equivalent of three days in a row of permanent work).

The retaining walls are 0.8 m (2 ft 7 in) in diameter and have five types of anchoring levels. Due to their height, a type of dual system called shear walls was necessary (seismic force resistance system, designed to resist lateral forces in the plane, typically wind and seismic loads and which is commonly used in structural engineering). In total, the building has 42,000 m^{2} (450,000 sq ft) of construction.

=== Workmanship ===
A total of 300 workers were involved in the project and various high-quality materials were used, such as white and grey grated bricks that were imported exclusively from the plant of the Spanish company La Paloma Cerámicas, a company with more than 50 years of experience in the manufacture of all types of ceramic products. They are self-ventilated facing bricks that generate "volume on the façade." These construction materials arrived to the construction site by ship; in total, it is estimated that 380,000 bricks were used for the construction and that they have a 100-year warrant.

This gives the building better absorption, which is between 3 and 4% of resistance, and also provides other benefits such as energy savings and thermal comfort, as they reduce humidity by 30%. All these characteristics make the building present a bioclimatic architecture.

In addition to the supply of ceramics, other companies were also involved, including Euromarmol and Tecnoglass, the first in everything related to floors and kitchens and the second in the supply of windows in general. In general terms, the entire building has marble floors and all areas of porcelain work.

It has glass windows, monolayers, and a 360-degree viewing point. From the highest part of the structure you can see different points and strategic sites of interest such as Avenida del Río, the Pumarejo bridge, and the Ventana al mundo monument.

The Icon building is considered to be one of the most innovative projects in the city.

== Inauguration ==
«This building is a Colombian-Spanish pride, a true pride of Barranquilla; it has the best designs, materials and efforts from both continents. Receiving His Majesty and the President of Colombia in this building is a luxury, it is the type of experiences we want for La Puerta de Oro, what the city deserves.»

— Project manager Aurelio Vásquez about the building.

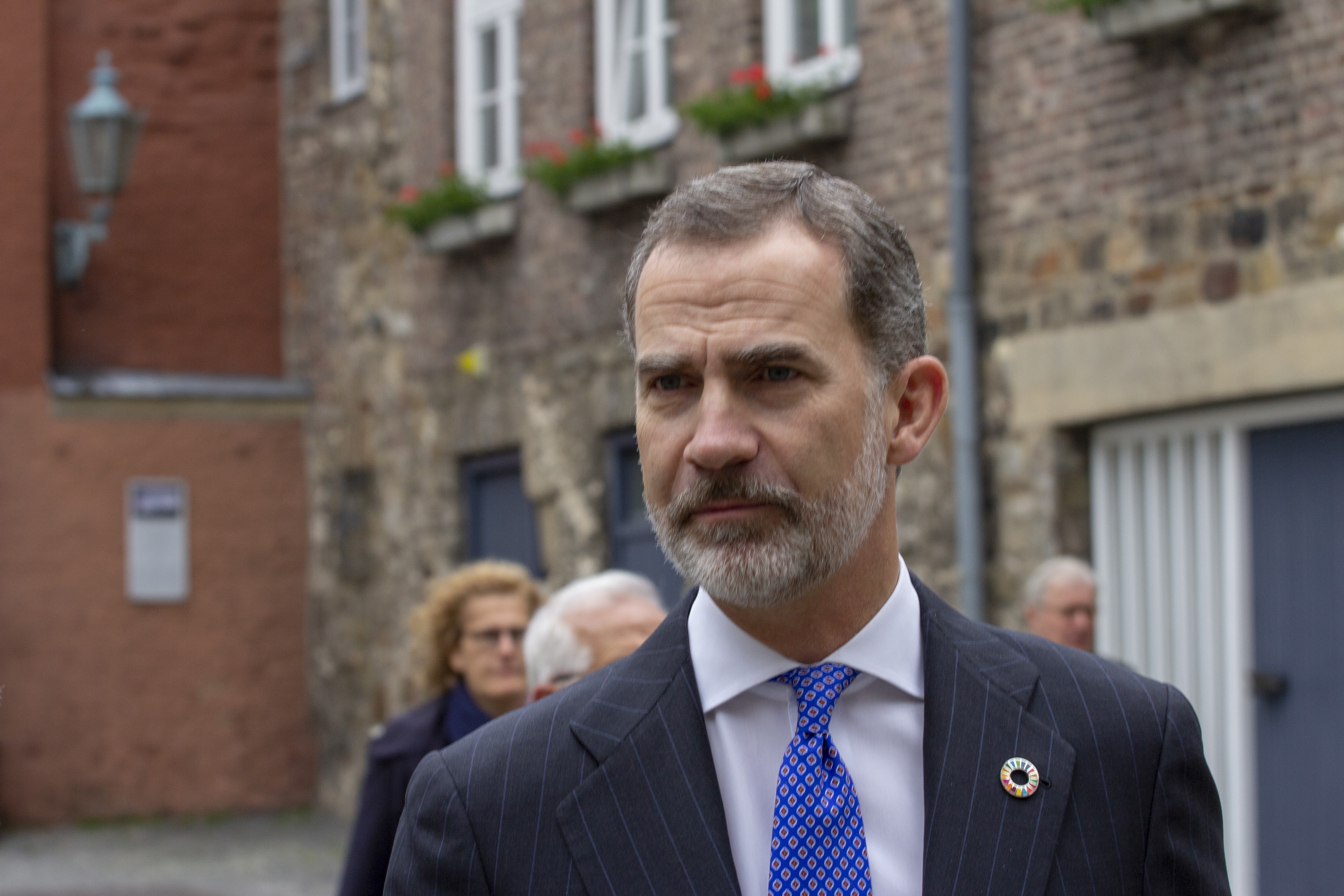
The building's inauguration was attended by Felipe VI of Spain.

The Icon was officially inaugurated on December 3, 2021. The event was attended by various regional, local, national and international personalities, including the mayor of Barranquilla Jaime Pumarejo, the governor of Atlántico Elsa Noguera, the vice president and chancellor Marta Lucía Ramírez, the president of Colombia Iván Duque, Francisco Antonio Rodríguez the CEO of the Spanish company La Paloma Cerámicas, Aurelio Vázquez, general manager of the project, and other local and national authorities consisting of members of the public force, businessmen, participants of the World Law Congress 2021 and investors. At the international level, it was attended by Felipe VI of Spain; the Spanish minister of justice, Pilar Llop; the lawyer and president of the World Jurist Association, Javier Cremades; and other personalities who accompanied the Spanish head of state.

A commemorative plaque was placed on the building, highlighting the inauguration and visit of Felipe VI of Spain and President Iván Duque, on the occasion of the World Law Congress of the World Jurist Association.

The building was one of the alternative venues for the World Law Congress 2021. This site also hosts social events, talks, conferences, conservatories and other activities, in addition to having a room for teleworking and a theater with capacity for 13 people for the performance of various works and stories.

== Gallery ==
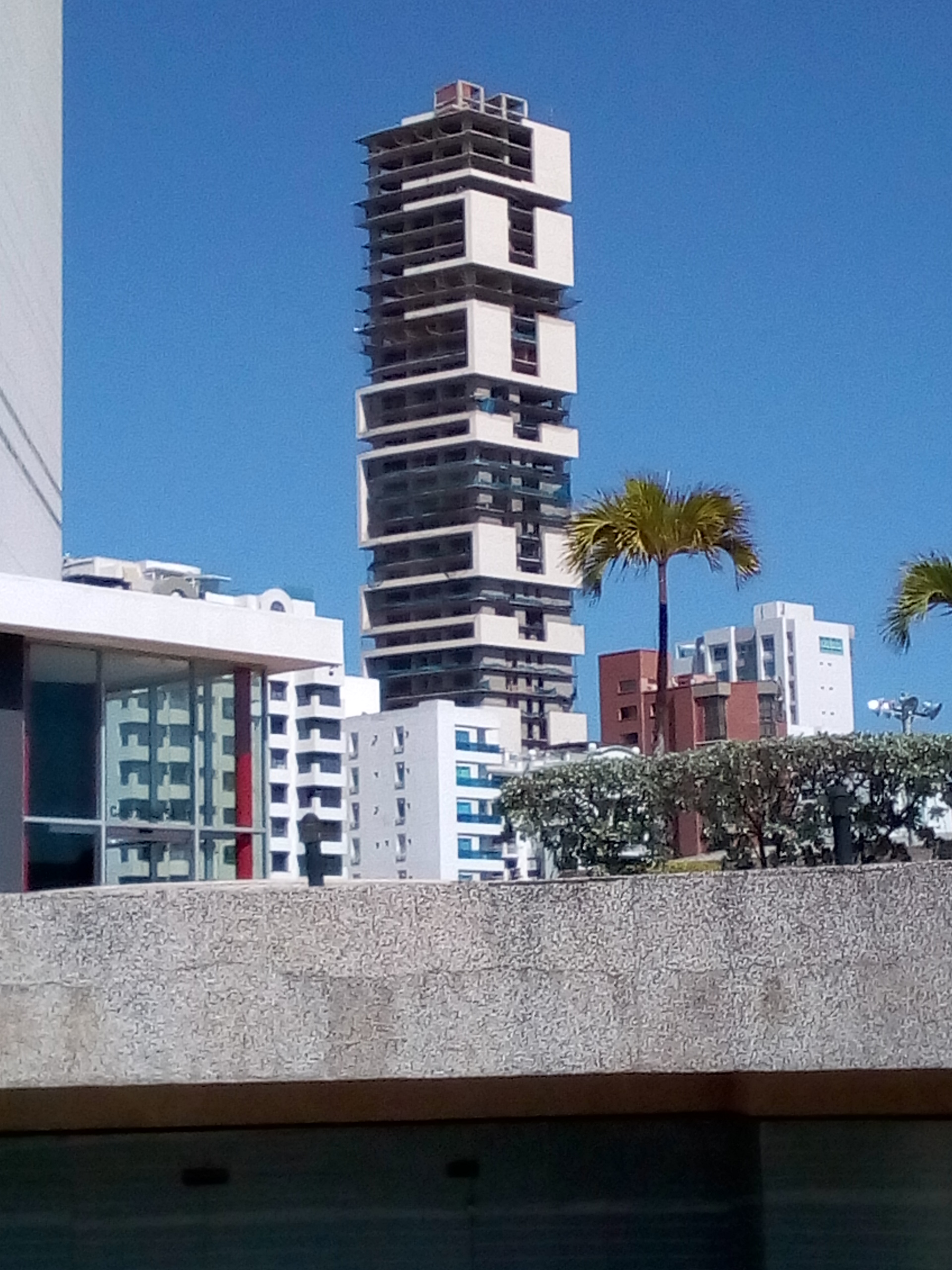
The tower under construction in January 2021

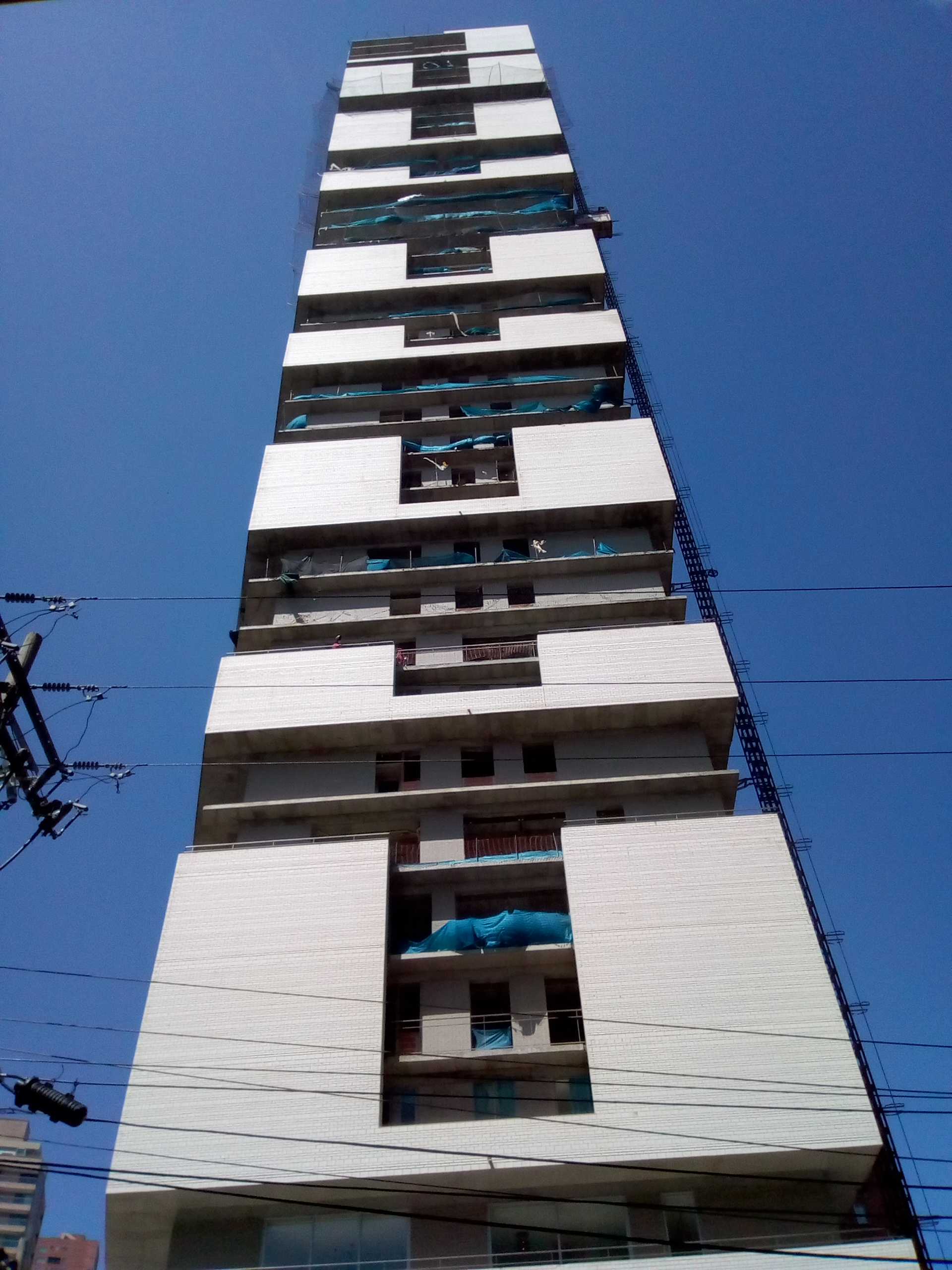
Closer look and details of the construction

== See also ==
- List of tallest buildings in South America
- List of tallest buildings in Latin America
- List of tallest buildings in Colombia
