= Mirage 57 =

Skyscraper in Barranquilla, Colombia

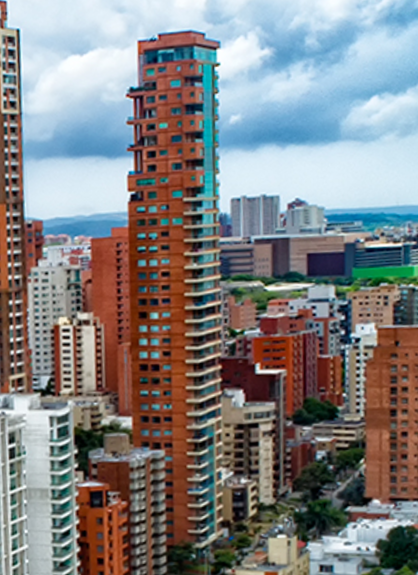

General information
- Status: Completed
- Type: Residential
- Location: Barranquilla, Colombia, Cra. 81 # 57-30, Nte. Barranquilla, Atlántico, Colombia
- Coordinates: 11.00817°N 74.80980°W
- Construction started: 2013
- Completed: 2015

Height
- Roof: 162 m (531 ft)

Technical details
- Structural system: Reinforced concrete
- Floor count: 43

Design and construction
- Architect: Juan Pablo González Pérez
- Developer: GUIAR Group IPS y HSEQ S.A.S.
- Structural engineer: Orlando Herrera Martínez

Mirage 57 is a residential skyscraper in the Villa Country district of Barranquilla, Colombia. Built between 2013 and 2015, the tower stands at 162 m (531 ft) tall with 43 floors and is the current 16th tallest building in Colombia. It was the tallest building in Barranquilla between 2015 and 2021.

== History ==
The building is located in the El Golf neighborhood, in the northern Villa Country district of Barranquilla. It was built by the company Guiar SAS and cost 50 billion pesos. Furthermore, it complies with the Colombian Seismic-Resistant Construction Code (NSR-10), and also has another type of certification known as a "lightning-resistant system" (the second structure in Colombia with this certification), which serves as a standard of quality and sustainability.

It is one of the most modern skyscrapers in the city and the country and features state-of-the-art technology in security and environmental management. It has special lightning protection called DEHN + SOHNE, fire doors, solar panels, wind power generation, vehicle emissions control, a specific fire suppression system, water reserves in case of emergencies or contingencies, and a specific water collection system.

The project features a special observation deck, event spaces, a spa, a virtual golf simulator, a movie theater, hot tubs, Wi-Fi, a solarium, a wine cellar, valet parking, a puppet theater, among other amenities. The Magdalena River can be seen from the top of the skyscraper.

== Architecture ==
The building has a total of 178 meters of open space and was designed with the highest standards of environmental sustainability, in addition to the implementation of various techniques for harnessing solar energy. Due to its great height and strong winds, the building will produce wind energy and will also have solar panels that will contribute to a 35% savings in the energy consumption of the common areas.

The tower's construction required the removal of 15,000 m^{3} (530,000 cu ft) of earth to a depth of 23 meters on the construction land site. The foundations of this building are 2.5 meters thick, and ice was used in the concrete mix to "rapidly dissipate the heat of hydration, generate uniform cooling, and prevent harmful tensile stresses." Another feature was the use of 8,000 pounds per square inch (psi) pure concrete, which allowed it to withstand the gravitational loads due to the great height. In total, 11,000 m^{2} (118,000 sq ft) of concrete of different types were required, including concrete for flooring, floor slabs, and non-structural components and/or elements, among others.

The building features a modern and advanced water collection system that allows for the reuse of the liquid discharged from all installed refrigeration equipment through strategically placed alternative pipes. This water is collected in two tanks with a capacity of approximately 3,000 liters and is used in the gardens, common areas, and green spaces, among other areas. The plumbing system (potable water pipes, sanitary sewer pipes, downpipes, fire protection systems, service connections, etc.) uses high-quality pipes that withstand high pressures and were supplied by the company Pavco.

It also complies with all Colombian standards and certifications regarding the proper use and handling of connections and soldering , ensuring "good operation within quality and safety standards."

The facade was constructed using highly resistant materials such as tolete brick, a building material with excellent resistance to external factors in terms of absorption, compression, and bending. Clay blocks were also used, and techniques such as dry plastering were employed. Other materials, such as glass and aluminum, were used in the doors, railings, and the entire window system of the building. The Colombian company Energía Solar was responsible for supplying all the glass for the doors and windows and for creating the casement frames; a type of tempered glass called Solex was used in these.

== See also ==
- List of tallest buildings in South America
- List of tallest buildings in Latin America
- List of tallest buildings in Colombia
