= North Point Building Complex =

Office skyscraper in Bogotá, Colombia

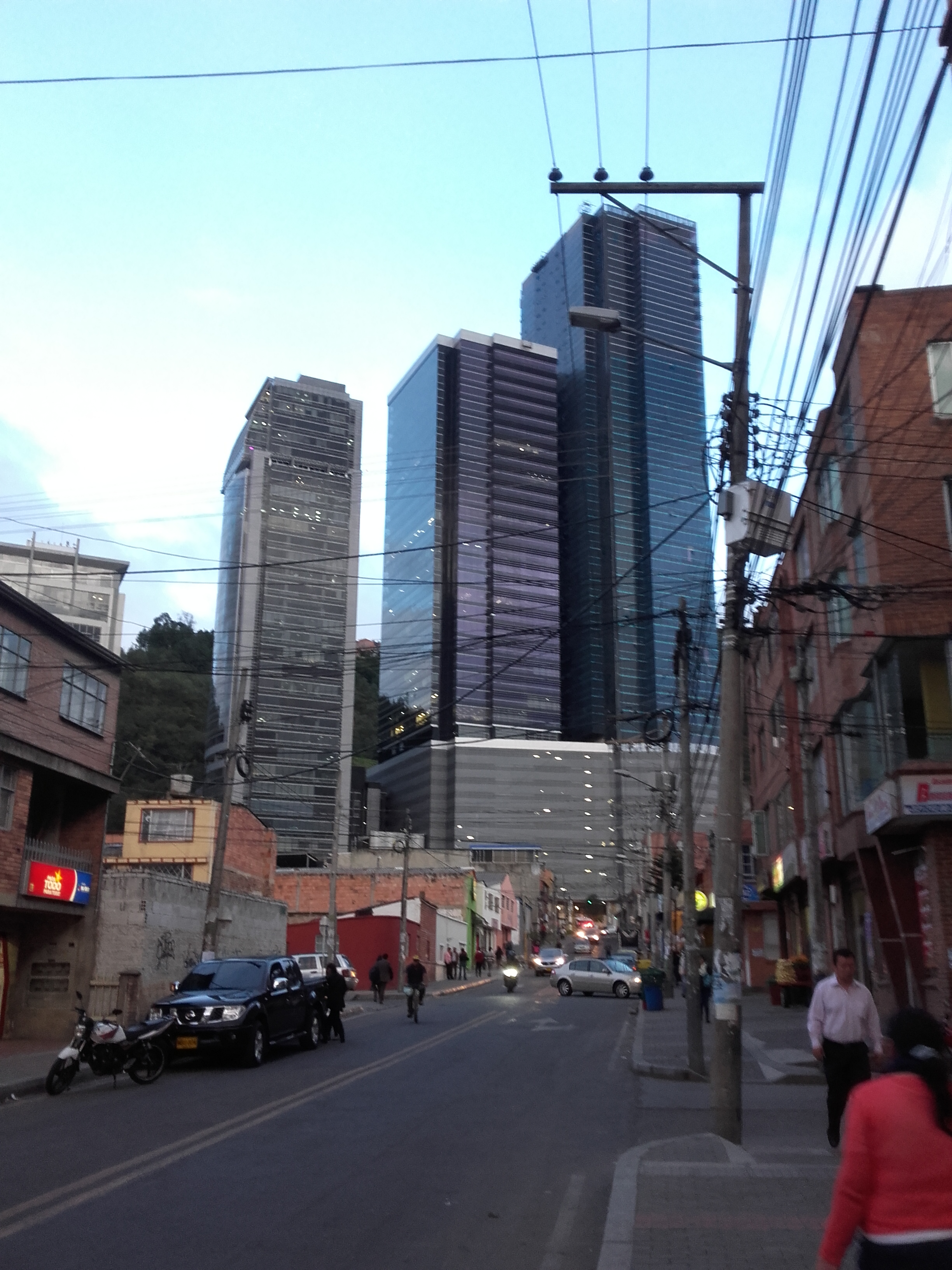
- Interactive map of the North Point Building Complex area

General information
- Status: Completed
- Type: Office
- Location: Bogotá, Colombia, Cra. 7 #156-80, Bogotá, Colombia
- Coordinates: 4.73248°N 74.02366°W
- Construction started: 2008
- Completed: 2017
- Owner: North Point Business Center

Height
- Roof: 172 m (564 ft) (Tower E)

Technical details
- Structural system: Concrete
- Floor count: 45 (Tower E)
- Lifts/elevators: 7

Design and construction
- Developer: Rincón Development

The North Point Building Complex is an office skyscraper complex in Bogotá, Colombia. Built between 2008 and 2017, the complex comprises five buildings with the tallest (Tower E or North Point V) standing at 172 m (564 ft) with 45 floors, which is the current 11th tallest building in Colombia.

== History ==
=== Architecture ===
The complex of buildings is located in the northeast of Bogotá, the capital of Colombia. It is planned to build 8 towers in total, of which five are already built. Due to the construction of these towers, the area becomes a different place from the city center for the installation of new companies arriving in Colombia.

The Barrancas and Sierras del Moral quarries in the town of Usaquén were located in the area where this business complex is being developed. The project developers Rafael, Jairo and Guillermo Rincón decided to recover the site in order to be able to use it and exploit it commercially. On site, a morphological recovery was carried out in which the hills ruined by the exploitation of the quarries were converted into terraces to avoid landslides, then biological - ecological care was carried out with the planting of plants and grass.

== Buildings ==
Comprising 150 offices, 604 private parking spaces, 33 common parking spaces, communal dining rooms, food court, commercial premises, 2 meeting rooms and a boardroom.

North Point III has 33 floors with 95 offices ranging in size from 82 to 120 m^{2}. It also has a ten-level parking platform, two commercial premises and an entrance and reception hall. In addition, it has seven state-of-the-art elevators that complement its design.

The Krystal Tower is the fourth tower in the North Point business complex. This tower is connected by a pedestrian link at the lobby level with the North Point III tower and has a height of 150 meters and 35 floors, a constructed area of 52,115 m^{2}, 4 commercial premises and 501 parking spaces. It also has a gym on the upper floors, an auditorium with capacity for 135 people, meeting rooms and a mini terrace. The machine room is located on the 36th floor.

Tower E is the fifth building in the North Point complex. It is an office tower with 45 habitable floors and 184 meters of height, surpassing the four towers that have been built so far in the complex. 5 It has 2 commercial premises and 500 parking spaces, as well as two auditoriums with capacity for 90 people, meeting rooms, VIP rooms and a mini terrace. The machine room is located on the 46th floor.

Name	Image	Height m (ft)	Floors	Start	Completion
North Point I			20	2007	2008
North Point II			20	2007	2008
North Point III		125 m (410 ft)	34	2008	2009
Krystal Tower		150 m (490 ft)	35	2013	2015
Torre E		172 m (564 ft)	45	2014	2017

== See also ==
- List of tallest buildings in South America
- List of tallest buildings in Colombia
