= Avianca Building =

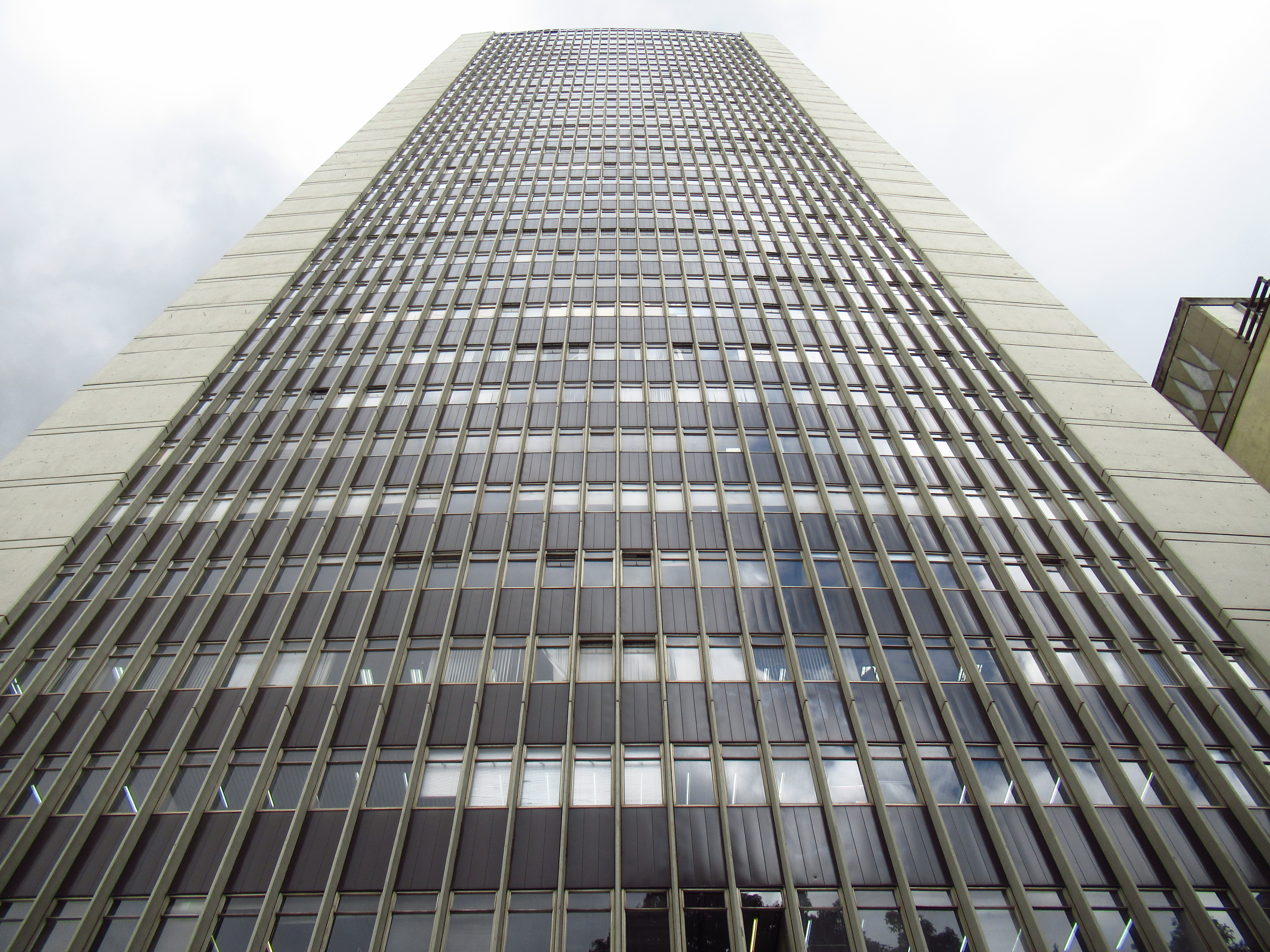

General information
- Status: Completed
- Type: Office
- Location: Bogotá, Colombia
- Coordinates: 4.6025°N 74.0725°W
- Construction started: 1963
- Completed: 1969
- Owner: Avianca

Height
- Roof: 161 m (528 ft)

Technical details
- Floor count: 40
- Lifts/elevators: 17

Design and construction
- Architects: Esguerra, Sáenz, Urdaneta, Samper and Cia.

Avianca Building is a 161-meter-tall office skyscraper located at the intersection of 16th street and Seventh Avenue, next to Santander Park in the city of Bogotá, Colombia.

The Avianca Building was designed and constructed by Esguerra, Sáenz, Urdaneta, Samper y Cía., together with Ricaurte Prieto Carrizosa and Italian engineer Doménico Parma, after a competition among several of the most prominent architectural firms in Colombia. The design was completed in 1963, and construction took place between 1966 and 1969 on the former site of the demolished Hotel Regina. The building was inaugurated at the end of 1969 as the headquarters of the airline Avianca. Upon its completion, the Avianca Building became the tallest building in Bogotá and Colombia, and one of the tallest office buildings in South America.

"Clásicos de Arquitectura: Edificio Avianca / Germán Samper". ArchDaily Colombia (in Spanish).

"Avianca Tower". Structurae.

"Edificio Avianca". Germán Samper Arquitectos (in Spanish).

The Avianca Building was designed and constructed by Esguerra, Sáenz, Urdaneta, Samper y Cía., together with Ricaurte Prieto Carrizosa and Italian engineer Doménico Parma, after a competition among several of the most prominent architectural firms in Colombia. The design was completed in 1963, and construction took place between 1966 and 1969 on the former site of the demolished Hotel Regina. The building was inaugurated at the end of 1969 as the headquarters of the airline Avianca. Upon its completion, the Avianca Building became the tallest building in Bogotá and Colombia, and one of the tallest office buildings in South America.

"Clásicos de Arquitectura: Edificio Avianca / Germán Samper". ArchDaily Colombia (in Spanish).

"Avianca Tower". Structurae.

"Edificio Avianca". Germán Samper Arquitectos (in Spanish).

== 1973 Fire ==
Shortly after 7:00 a.m. on July 23, 1973, a fire broke out on the 14th floor of the building, where flammable materials such as rugs, carpets, and gasoline were being stored. Building employees initially attempted to extinguish the flames using buckets of water and fire extinguishers. Firefighters arrived approximately 15 minutes later, but their hoses could only reach the 12th floor.

The fire rapidly spread from the 14th to the 37th floor and burned for more than 12 hours. Many occupants evacuated by stairway, while others sought refuge on the roof, where they were rescued by helicopter. Rescue helicopters also dropped water onto the building during the emergency. Several people, overwhelmed by panic, jumped from the building and died.

The fire left four people dead and 63 injured, but the building did not suffer significant structural damage.

== See also ==
- Avianca
- List of tallest buildings in Colombia
