= Torre de la Escollera =

Residential skyscraper in Cartagena, Colombia

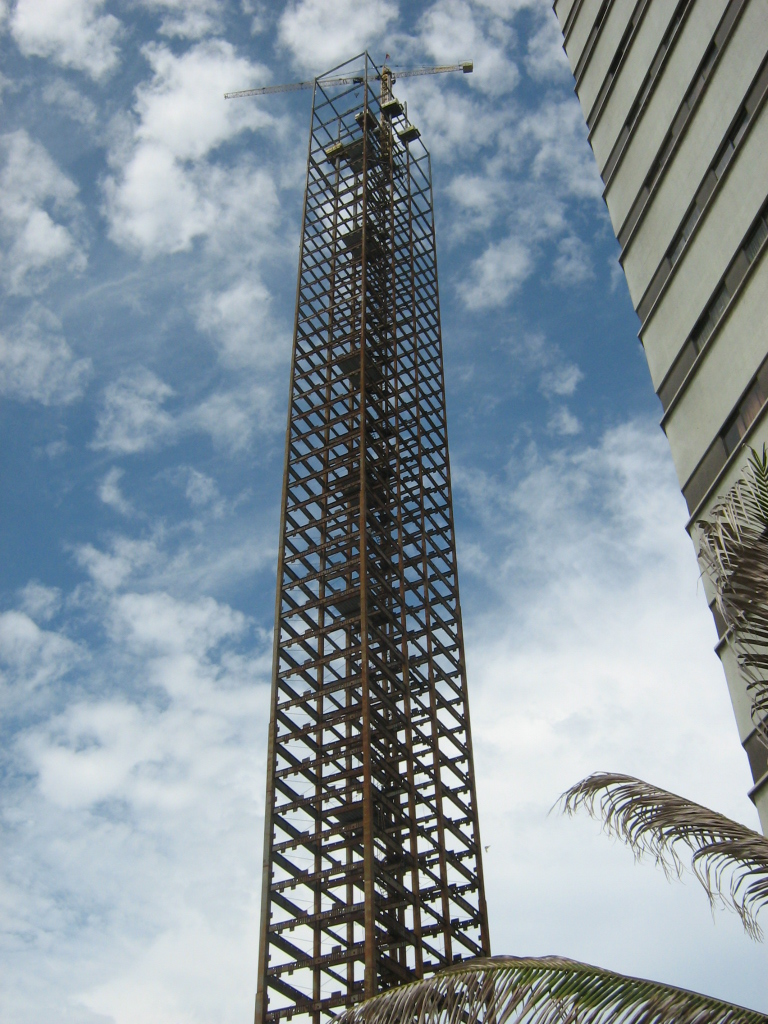
- Torre de la Escollera on May 22, 2007
- Interactive map of the Torre de la Escollera area

General information
- Status: Demolished
- Type: Residential
- Location: Cartagena, Colombia
- Coordinates: 10°23′59″N 75°33′35″W
- Construction started: 2005
- Topped-out: 2007
- Completed: Never
- Demolished: 2007

Height
- Roof: 206 m (676 ft)

Technical details
- Floor count: 58

Design and construction
- Architect: Ángelo Fegali Corena

Torre de la Escollera was an unfinished 206-metre-tall (676 ft), 58-story residential skyscraper in Cartagena, Colombia. The building under construction suffered severe structural damage during a storm on May 13, 2007, and was dismantled later that year. Upon topping out in early 2007, before it was damaged by the storm, it surpassed the Torre Colpatria in Bogotá and briefly became the tallest building in Colombia until its destruction between July and November 2007, which once again made the Torre Colpatria the tallest building in the country.

== Design ==
The design of the skyscraper called for a slender tower, 206 m (676 ft) tall with 58 floors. It would have been divided into 88 apartments, with the upper floors having just one apartment per floor, topped by a three-level penthouse apartment and a rooftop helipad. With prices between 500 million and 1,200 million Colombian pesos, the apartments would have been the most expensive in Colombia. Other facilities would have included a swimming pool and a spa.

Construction of the skyscraper started in 2005. However, on May 13, 2007, with the building still under construction, a storm hit the city. The high winds and a lack of diagonal bracing caused a 1 m (3 ft) twist in the steel structure between floors 28 and 40. Construction was suspended, and the Society of Engineers and Architects of Bolívar recommended that the building be demolished. The building was dismantled from July to November 2007, making it the third-tallest building in the world to be voluntarily demolished behind Singapore's AXA Tower and New York City's 270 Park Avenue, as well as the tallest building in South America to be voluntarily demolished.

As of 2026, the Palmetto Beach Building, completed in 2016, now occupies the site where the skyscraper was demolished. As this building isn't even one of the 10 tallest in the city, Torre de la Escollera holds the record for the tallest building ever voluntarily demolished and replaced by a shorter building.

== Gallery ==
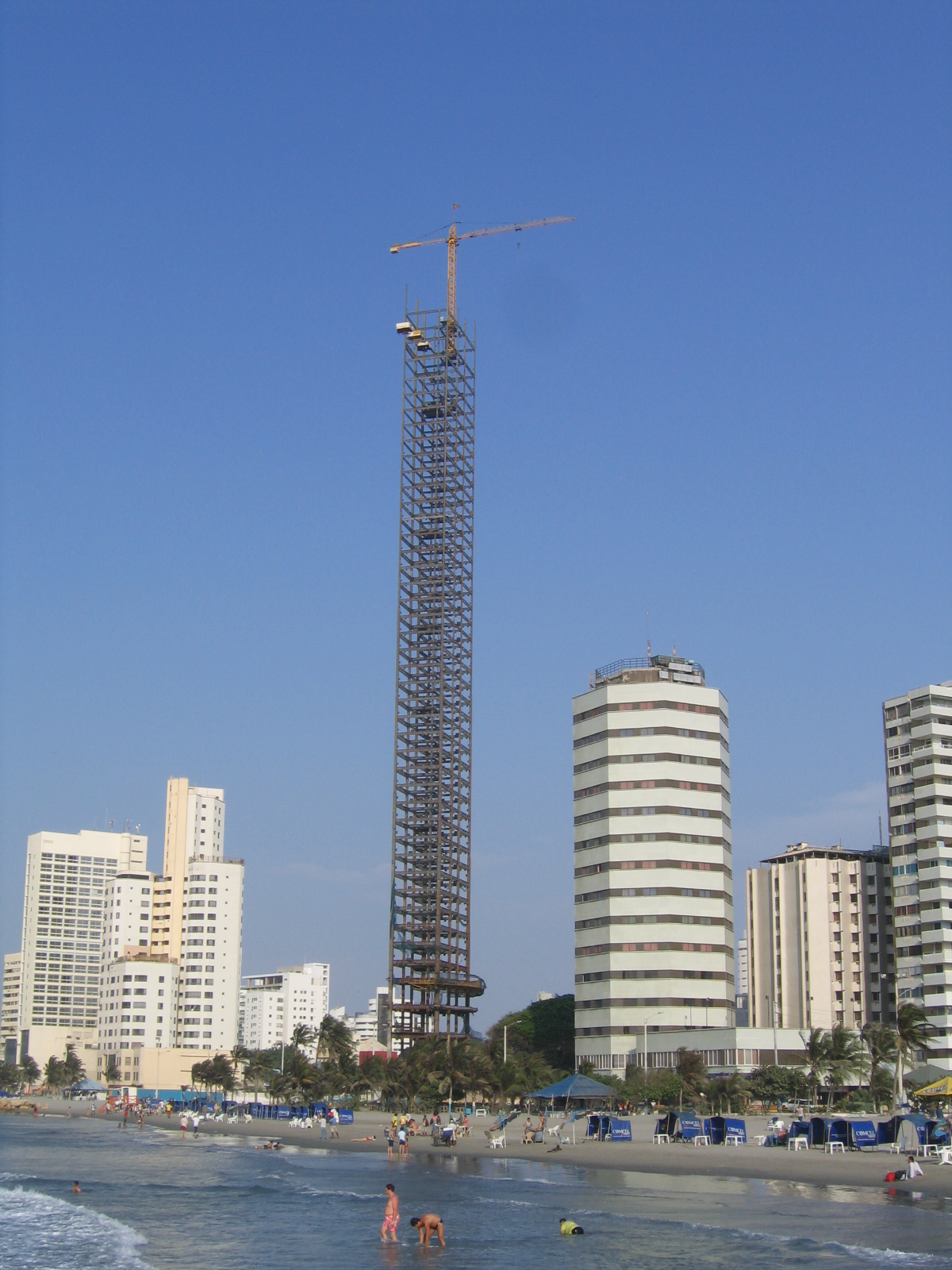
Torre de la Escollera under construction on February 26, 2007, two and a half months before sustaining storm damage

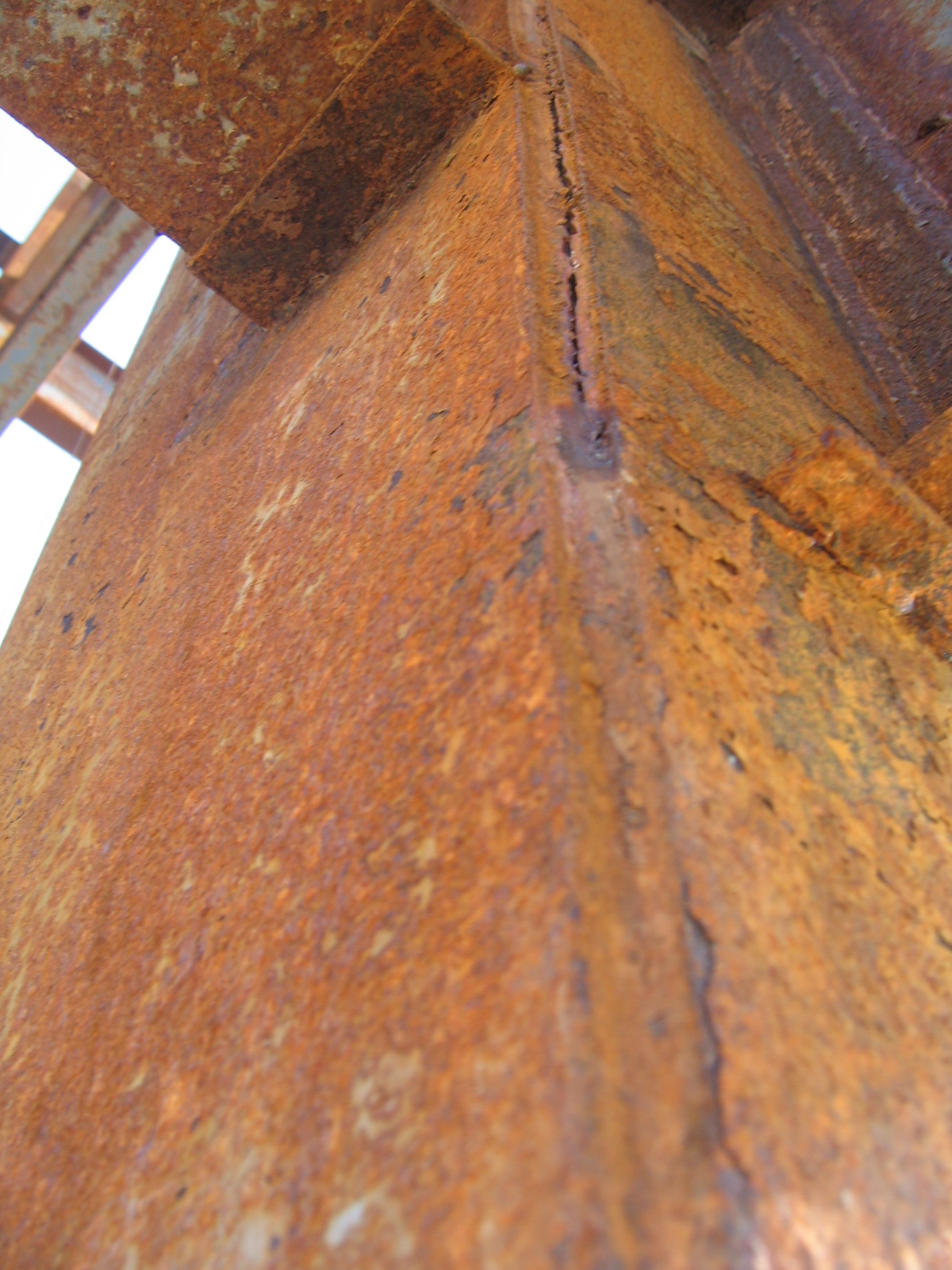
A close-up view showing structural failure in a steel beam of the Torre de la Escollera following the storm on May 13, 2007

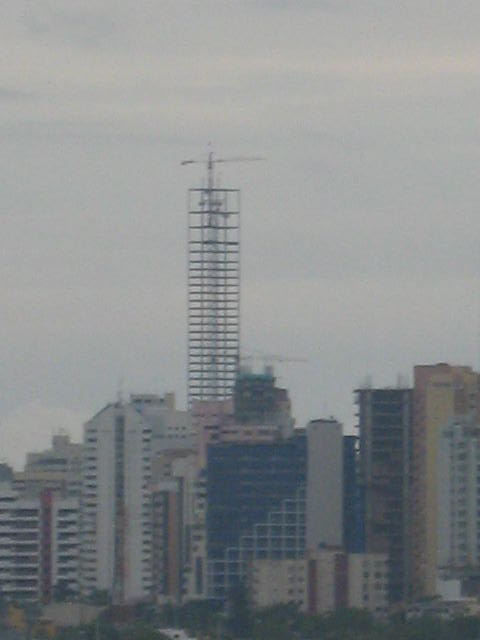
Torre de la Escollera on May 19, 2007

== See also ==
- Unfinished building
- List of tallest structures in South America
- List of tallest voluntarily demolished buildings
