= Torre Colpatria =

Office skyscraper in Bogotá, Colombia

Coordinates: 4°36′40″N 74°04′13″W

Colpatria Tower
- Torre Colpatria
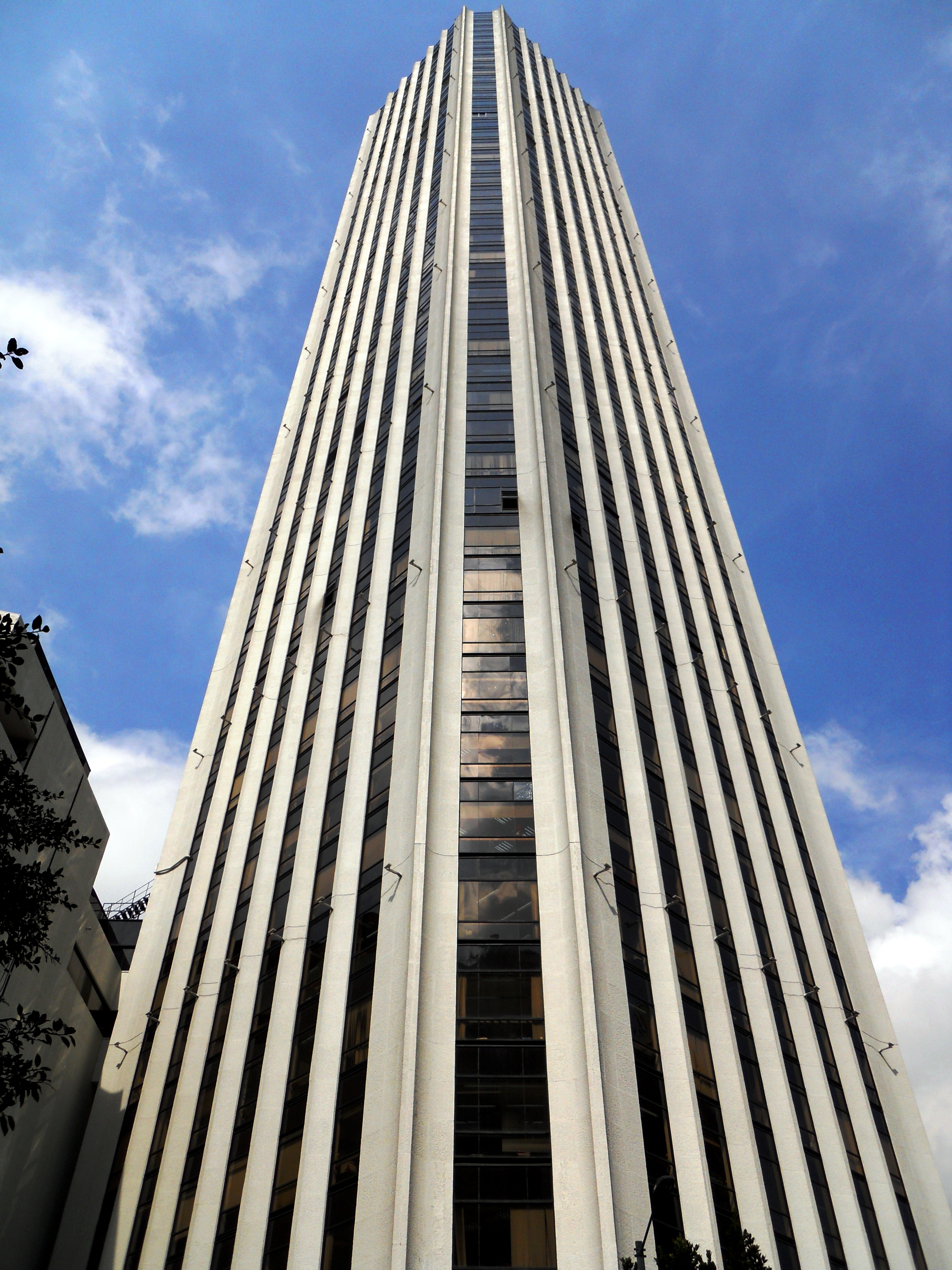
- Interactive map of the Colpatria Tower area

Record height
- Tallest in Colombia from 1978 to 2 April 2015^{[I]}
- Preceded by: Centro de Comercio Internacional, Bogotá; 192 m (630 ft)
- Surpassed by: BD Bacatá

General information
- Status: Completed
- Type: Office, observation
- Location: Bogotá, Colombia
- Construction started: 1973
- Completed: 1978
- Opened: 1979
- Owner: Grupo Empresarial Colpatria

Height
- Roof: 196 m (643 ft)

Technical details
- Floor count: 50
- Lifts/elevators: 13

Design and construction
- Architects: Obregón Valenzuela & Cía. Ltda.
- Main contractor: Pizano Pradilla Caro & Restrepo Ltda.

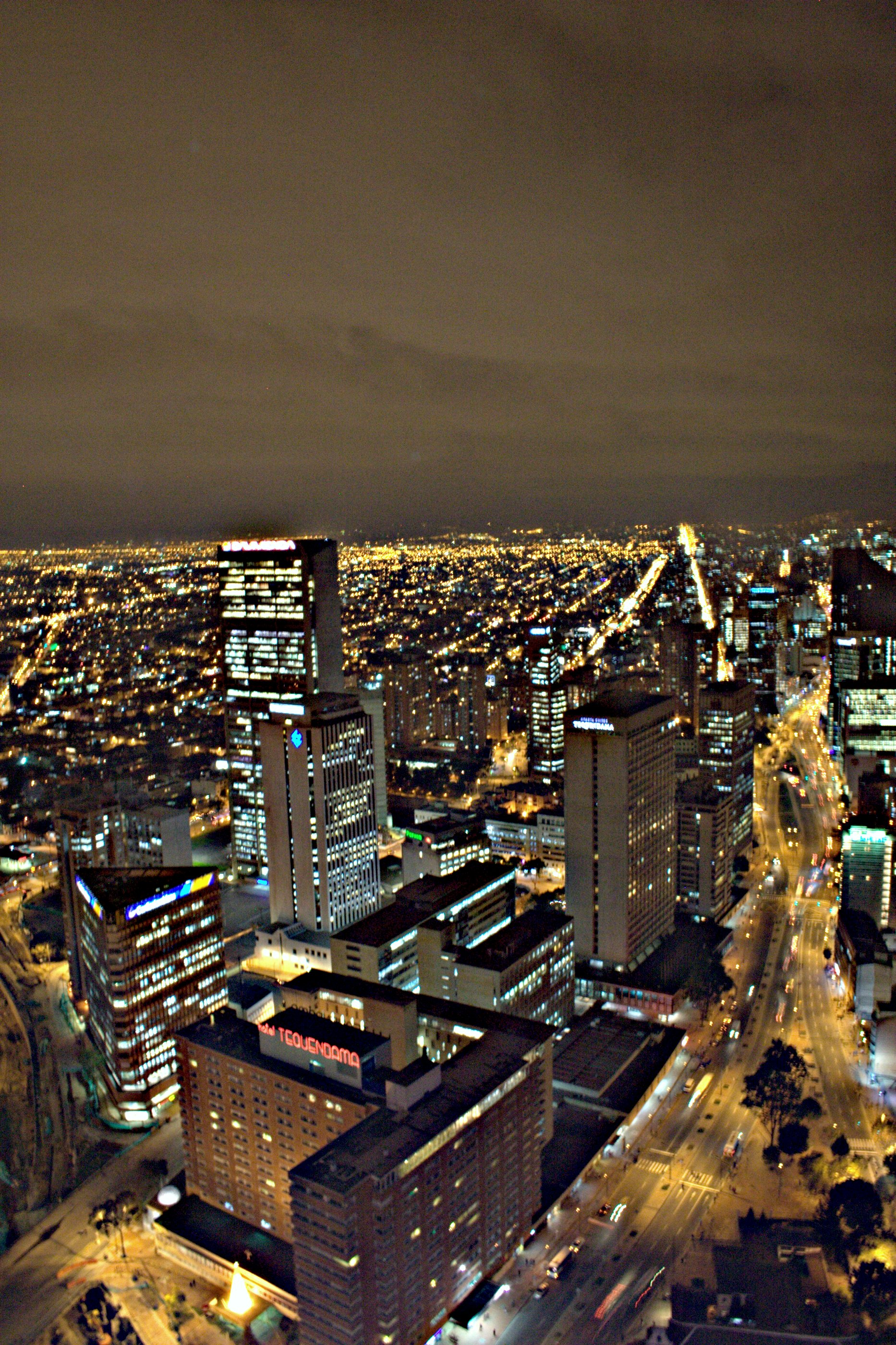
Downtown Bogotá as viewed from Torre Colpatria at night

The Torre Colpatria (English: Colpatria Tower) is a 50-story skyscraper in the downtown area of Bogotá, Colombia. It is the fourth tallest building in the country. Constructed between 1973 and 1978 and opened in 1979, the skyscraper stands at a total height of 196 metres (643 ft). Upon its completion, it became the tallest building in Colombia and held that title until 2007. Following the construction and subsequent destruction of the Torre de la Escollera in 2007, the building regained its status as the tallest in the country. It maintained this position until 2016, when the BD Bacatá Tower was topped off. The main headquarters of the Colpatria Bank are located in the building, and also a great number of other banks and financial corporations have offices in it. The building lies at the intersection of 26th street and 7th avenue, in the heart of the city's downtown.

Since 1998, the Colpatria Tower has been illuminated every night with thirty-six color changing Xenon lights. In 2012, the Dutch lighting company Philips replaced the old lights with a 120-metre (390 ft)-high LED system to improve the lighting of the building and project high-definition images. Because of that, and also because it was the tallest skyscraper in Colombia for almost 40 years, the building is a landmark in the country and dominates Bogota's skyline along with other structures such as the BD Bacatá, the World Trade Center, FONADE and Colseguros buildings.

== Architecture ==
The base of the tower is a square, constructed at the juncture of two of the most important avenues in Bogota. The building's facade comprises pilasters of concrete and vertical glazing bars, extending unbroken from ground level to the building's roof. The feature provides ventilation and natural light to offices.

The Torre Colpatria's complex includes a separate ten-floor building, built to give contrast to the main tower's height. There are several public and commercial banking offices, as well as parking facilities.

The tower has an observation deck on the 49th floor, open to visitors on weekends and holidays. Both its central location in Bogota and its height make the Torre Colpatria one of the city's most important observatories.

== Stats ==
- Height: 196 metres (643 ft)
- Floor count: 50
- Top floor: 48
- Capacity : 5.000

== Competition ==
Since 2005, a tower running race takes place on December 8 to climb the nine hundred eighty steps up, where participants, in groups of ten competitors, start every half minute. The record time is 5 minutes 11 seconds. Since 2010, this race has been part of the TowerRunning World Cup, an annual worldwide circuit that brings together more than 160 climb races in the tallest buildings in the world. The competition is the final stop of the circuit and the venue for the final awards ceremony. In 2012, it joined the Master Races group, which includes the 18 best climb races worldwide.

Year built	Companies	Location
1979	Colpatria Bank	Bogotá, Colombia

== See also ==
- List of tallest buildings in Colombia
- List of tallest buildings in South America
- BD Bacatá

== Gallery ==
Torre Colpatria at night

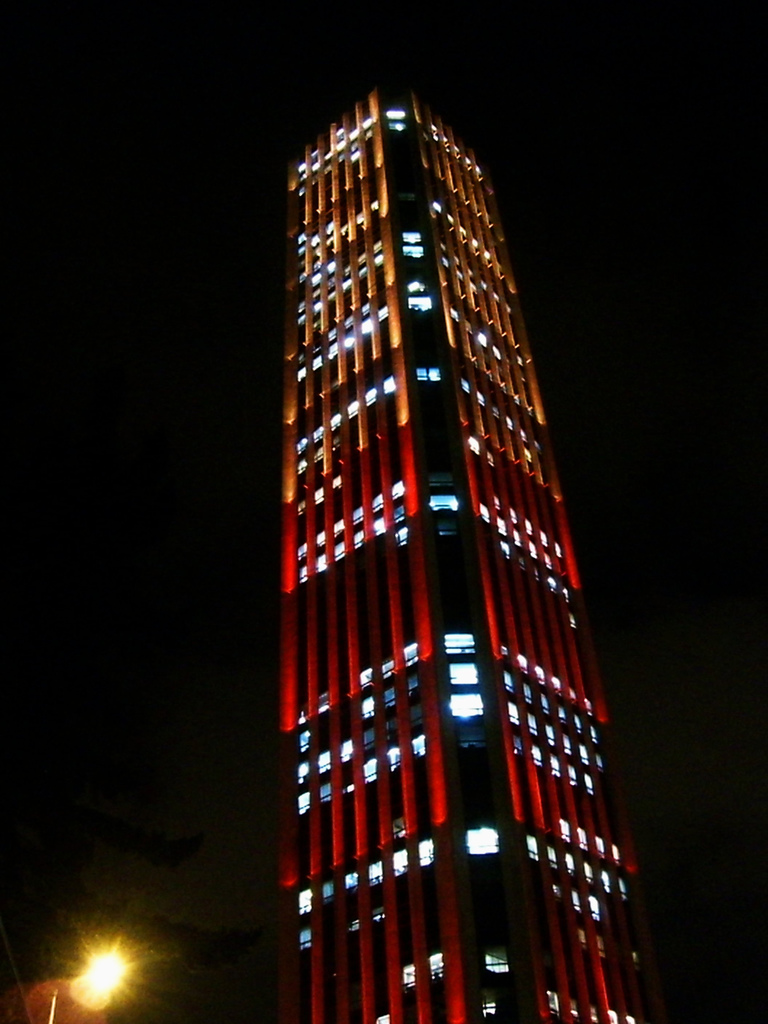
Torre Colpatria at night

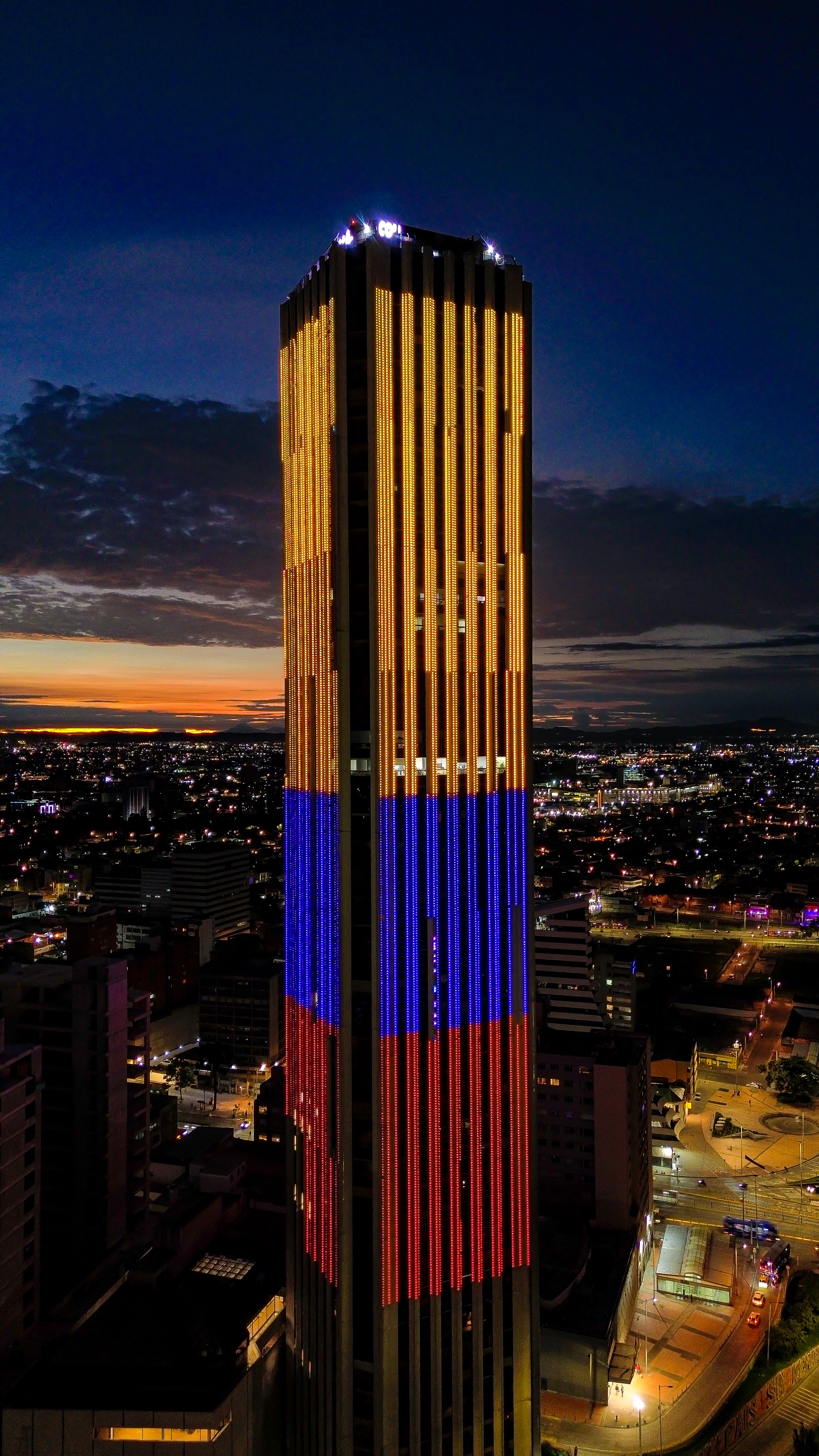
Aerial view

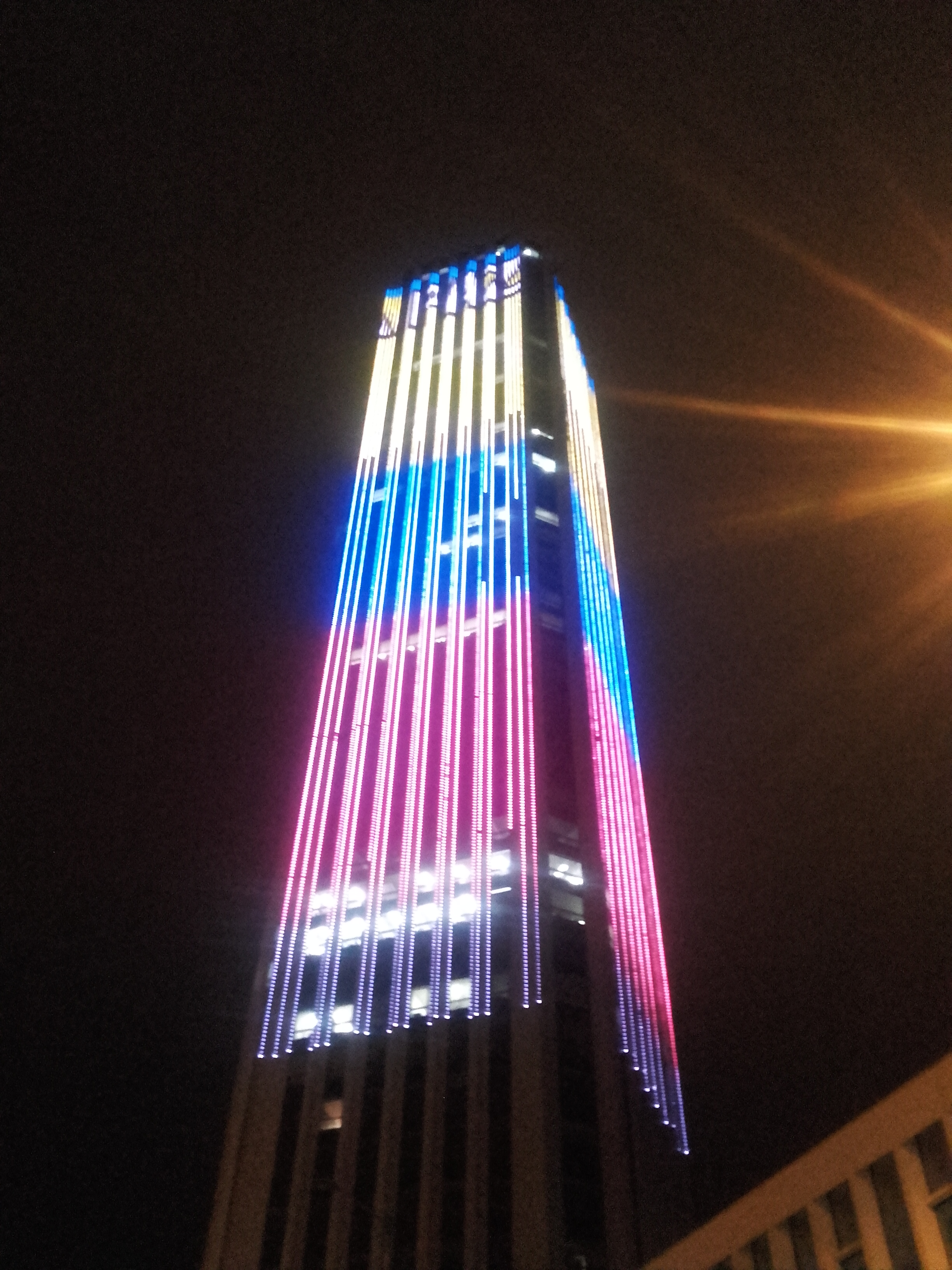
New illumination LED with Colombian flag colors
