= Torres Atrio =

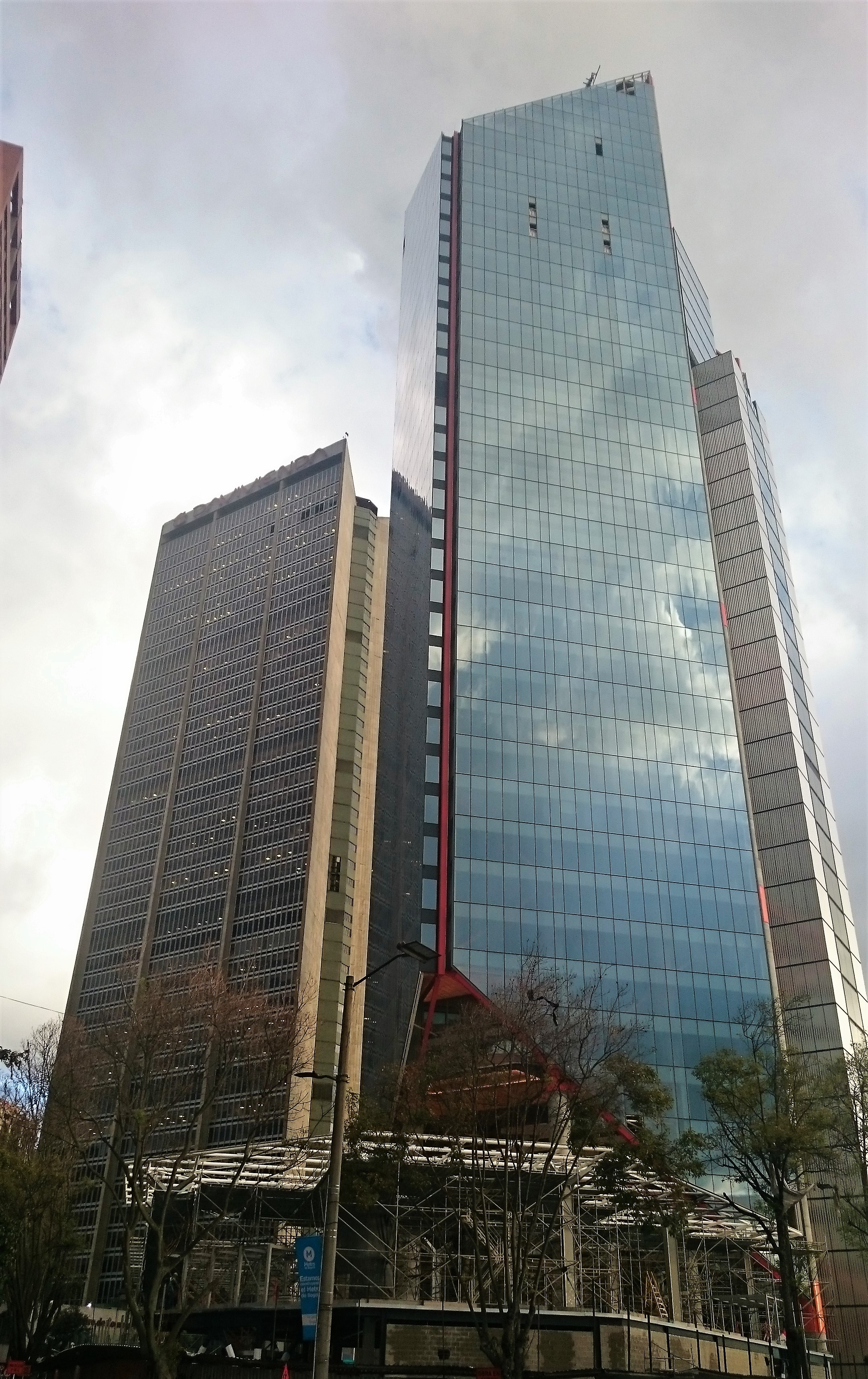
- Construction in April 2019
- Interactive map of the Torres Atrio area

General information
- Status: Under construction
- Location: Bogotá, Colombia
- Construction started: 2015
- Completed: 2019 (North Tower)

Technical details
- Floor count: 67
- Floor area: 239 000 m²
- Lifts/elevators: 43 ('South Tower'), 30 ('North Tower')

Design and construction
- Architects: Richard Rogers, (Colombia) Giancarlo Mazzanti
- Structural engineer: (United Kingdom) Arup, (Colombia) PyD.
- Services engineer: (Colombia) Poch.

The Torres Atrio (English: Atrium Towers) is an architectural complex under construction in Bogotá. The South Tower is planned to be the tallest building in Colombia at approximately 879 feet (268 m) in height. The complex is located at the intersection of Caracas Avenue and El Dorado Avenue. The complex will include two towers, the North Tower with 44 floors and the South Tower with 67. The Torres Atrio are being built on the former Gonzalo Jiménez de Quesada Convention Center and an adjacent parking lot.
