= Centro de Comercio Internacional =

Coordinates: 4°36′58″N 74°04′15″W

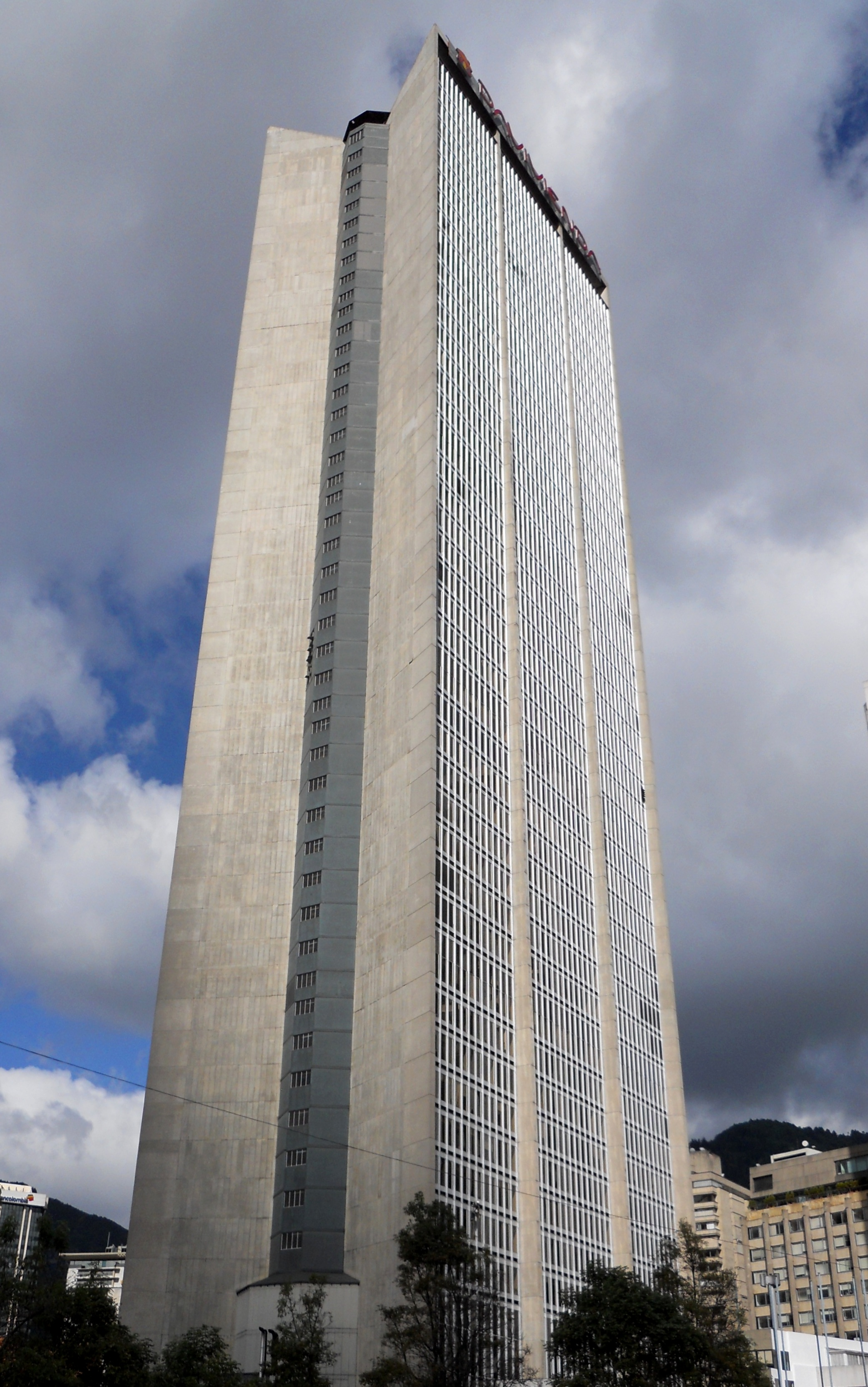
- Interactive map of the Centro de Comercio Internacional area

General information
- Status: Completed
- Type: Office
- Location: Bogotá, Colombia
- Construction started: 1974
- Completed: 1977

Height
- Antenna spire: 192 m (630 ft)
- Roof: 190 m (620 ft)

Technical details
- Floor count: 50
- Lifts/elevators: 17

Design and construction
- Architect: Cuellar Serrano Gómez y Cia.

Centro de Comercio Internacional is an office skyscraper located in Bogotá, Colombia. The building is 190 m/623 ft, 50 floors. The building is a neighbor of Torre Colpatria, the second-largest skyscraper in Colombia. Located inside this building are some of the offices of Davivienda Bank, which recently obtained the rights of the building. When it was built, it was called Centro Las Americas.

== Architecture ==
Its address is 28th Street # 13A - 15, it has 17 elevators, the service areas and the emergency stairs. The exterior of the building is defined by glass paneling and both lateral sides by only one vertical line of windows. The tower has a large open space in front of its entrance. The tower is in use and is the third tallest building in Bogotá. When it was completed in 1977, it was the tallest building in Latin America, and it continued to be so until the construction of the Colpatria Tower.

== See also ==
- List of tallest buildings in South America
- List of tallest buildings in Colombia
