= Cali Tower =

Building in Cali, Colombia

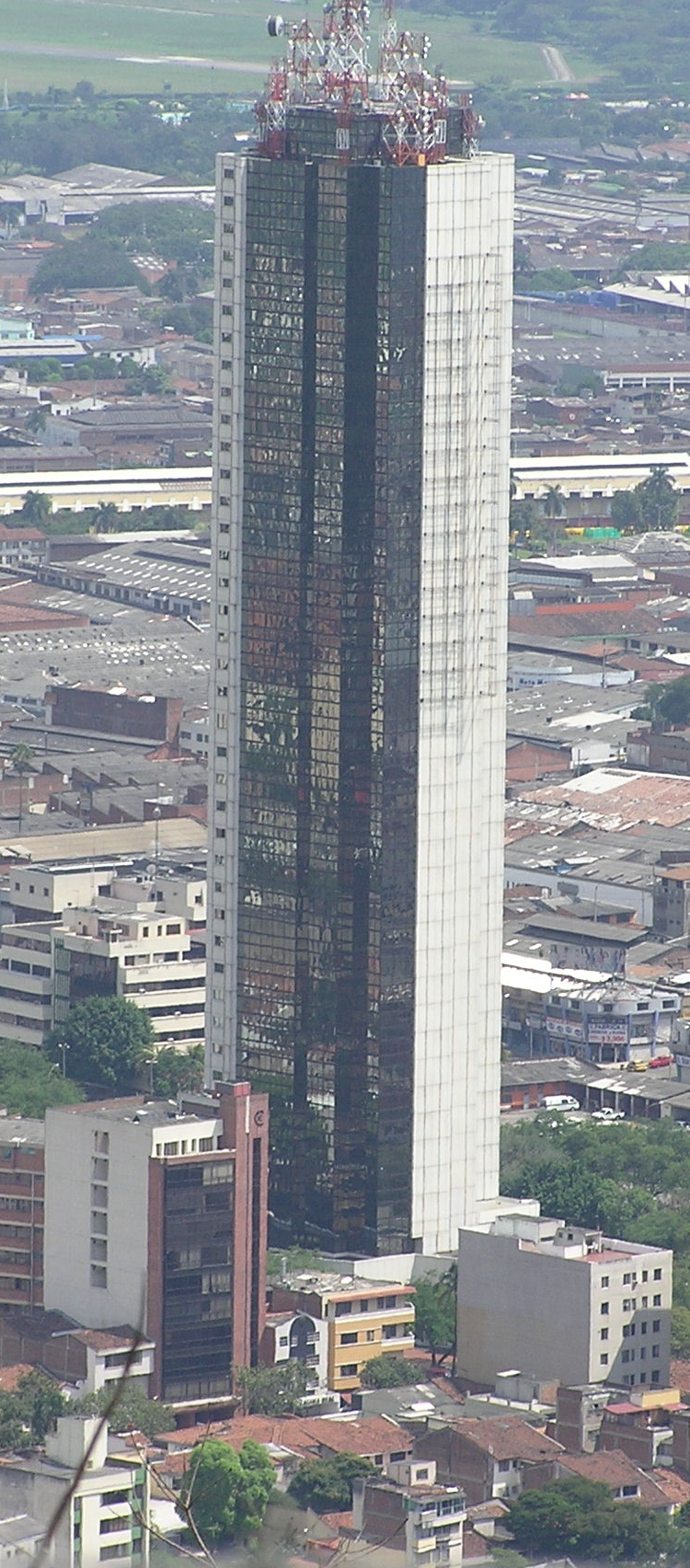
- Interactive map of the Cali Tower area

General information
- Status: Completed
- Location: Cali, Colombia
- Coordinates: 3°27′32.40″N 76°31′44.4″W
- Construction started: 1978
- Completed: 1984

Height
- Roof: 186 m (610 ft)

Technical details
- Floor count: 44
- Lifts/elevators: 7

Design and construction
- Developer: Julián Echeverri Arango

Website
- www.hoteltorredecali.com

Torre de Cali ("Cali Tower") is a 44-story skyscraper in the northern part of Cali, Colombia. It lies with the Versalles district on the left bank of the Cali River. With 186 m it is the tallest building in Cali and among the tallest in Colombia. Due to its dominance of the Cali skyline it has become a landmark building of the city.

== Gallery ==
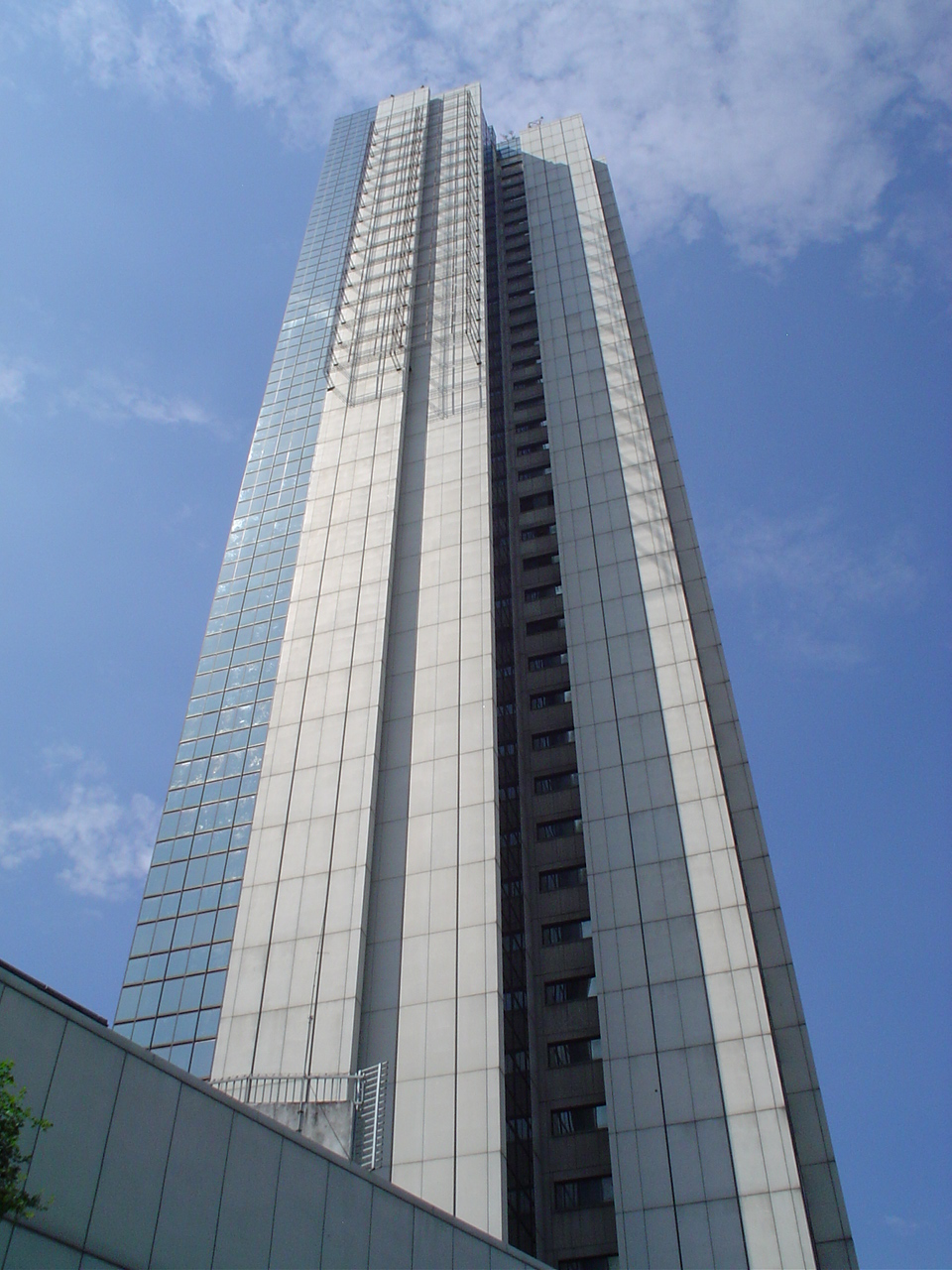
Torre de Cali

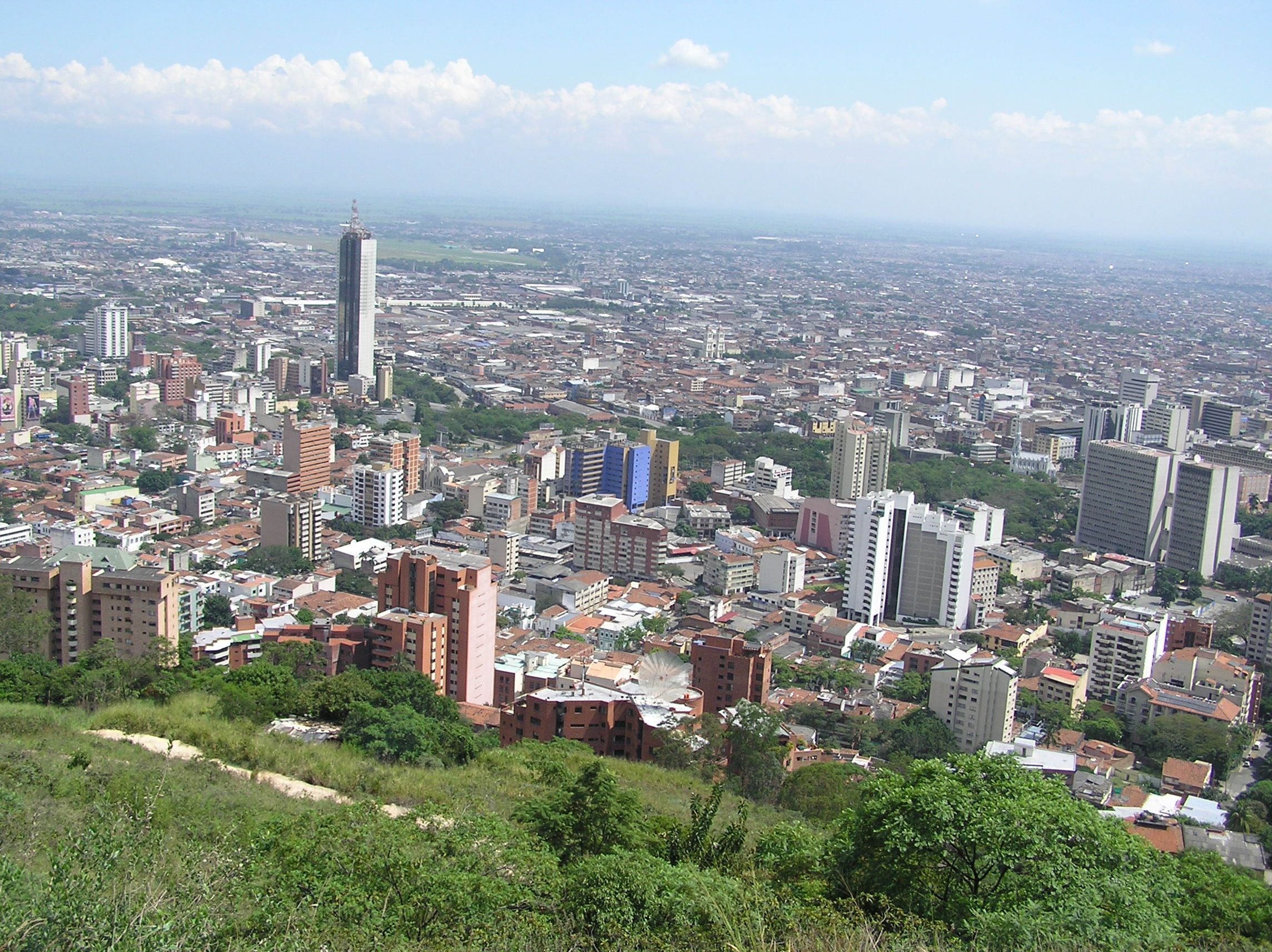
View of Northern Cali with the Torre de Cali

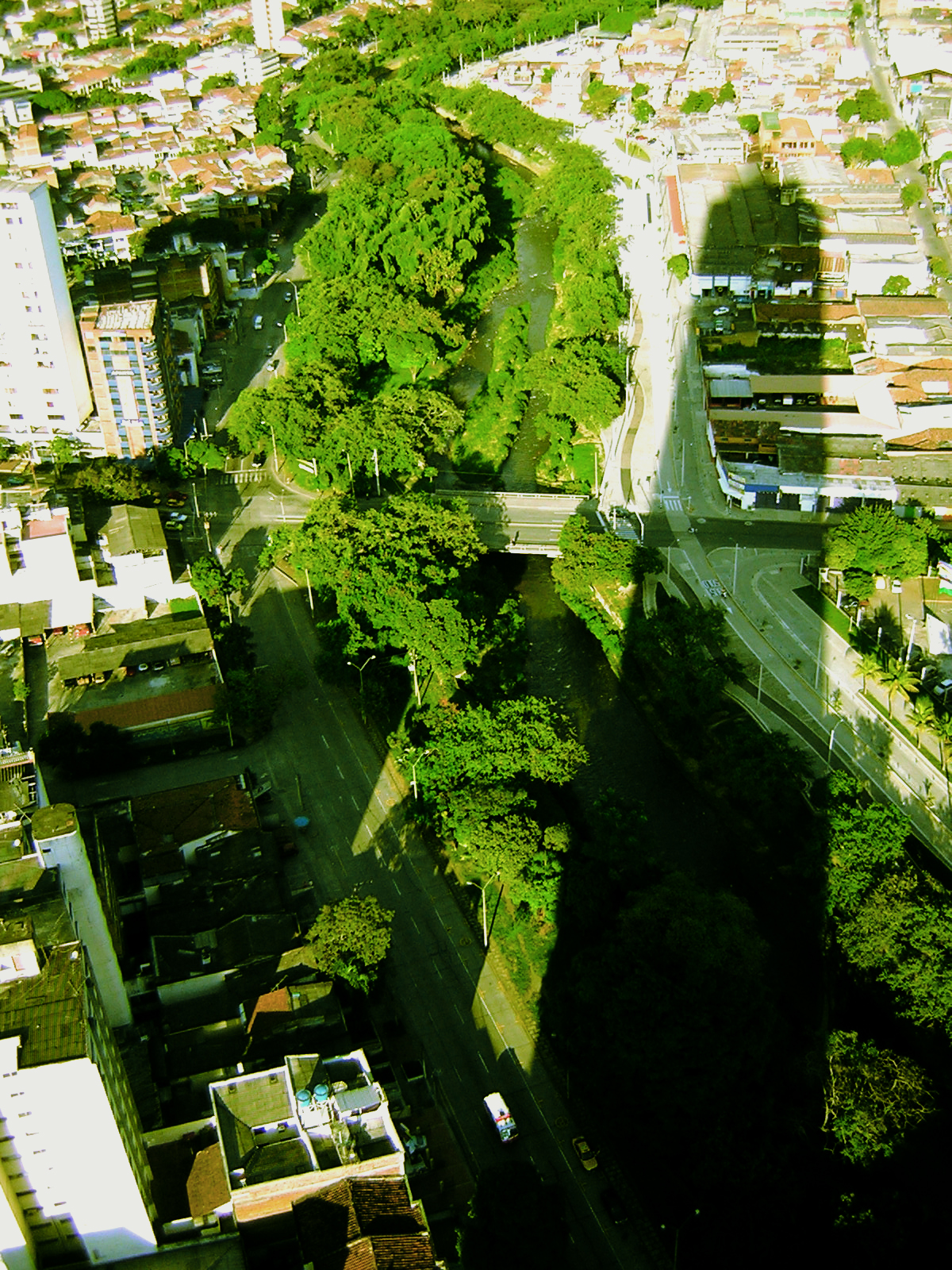
Shadow of the Torre de Cali over the Cali River

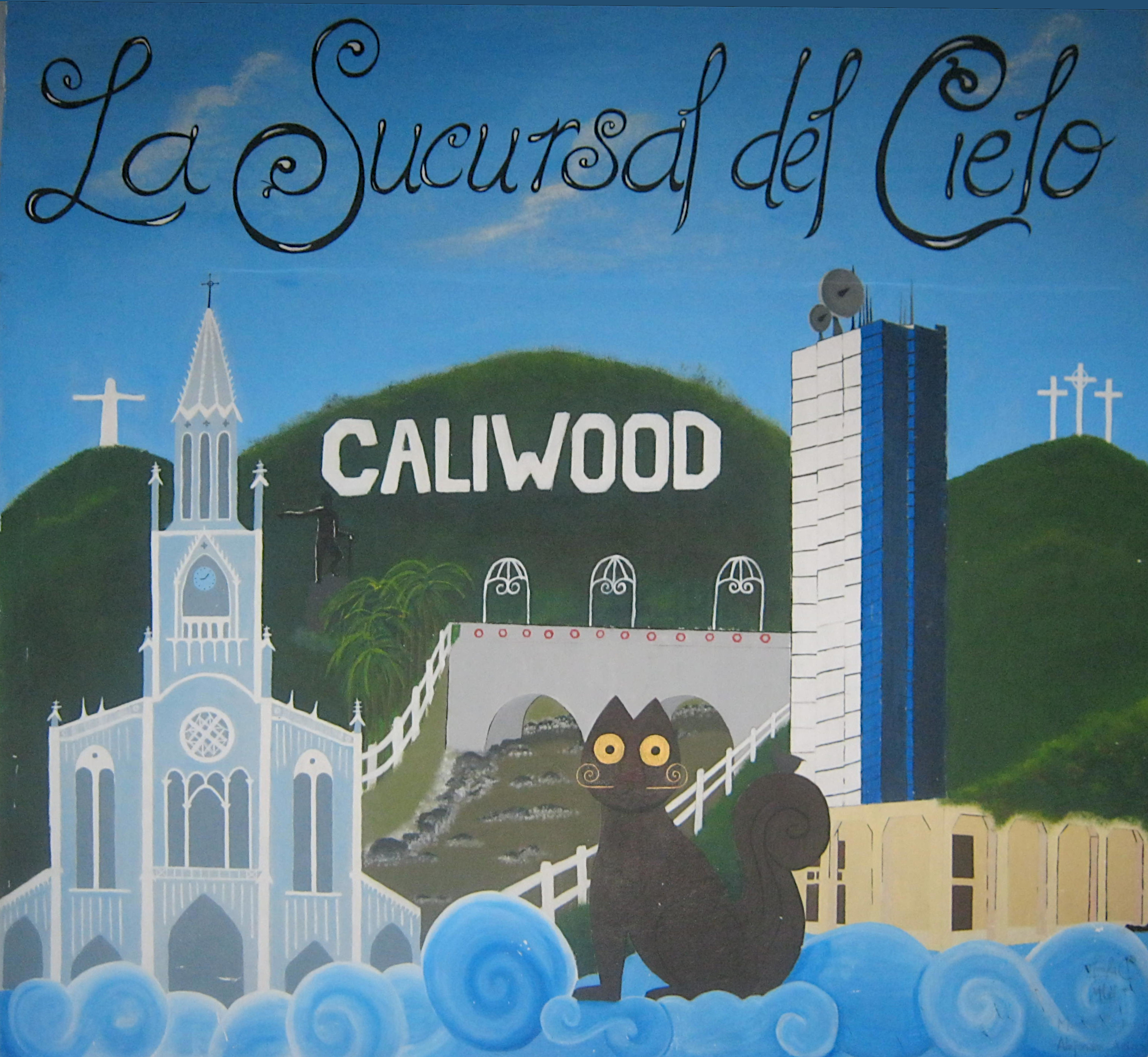
Mural with Cali's landmarks

== See also ==
- List of tallest buildings in South America
