= Sede do BankBoston =

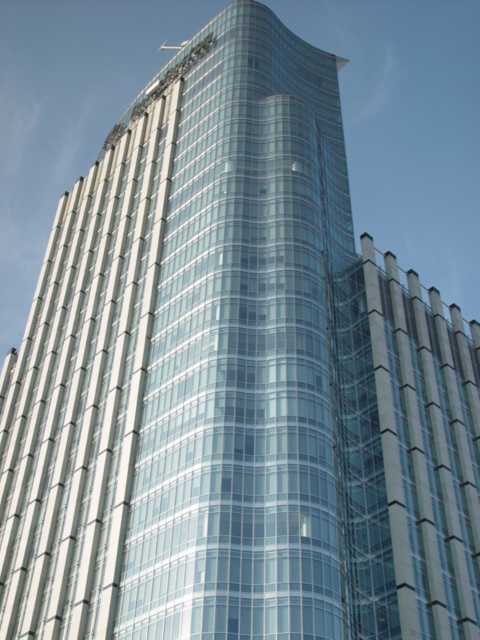

- Location within São Paulo Sede do BankBoston (Brazil)

General information
- Type: Office
- Location: São Paulo, SP Brazil
- Coordinates: 23°37′1.48″S 46°41′57.09″W
- Completed: 2002

Height
- Roof: 476 ft (145 m)

Technical details
- Floor count: 35

Design and construction
- Architect: Adrian Smith (architect)

Sede do BankBoston (formerly Edifício Itaú Bank, at Itaú Fidelité Marginal Pinheiros) is a 35-story skyscraper in São Paulo, Brazil. The structure is a great office skyscraper located in Brooklin, near the Marginal Pinheiros, São Paulo, Brazil. Inaugurated in 2002, it is 145 meters in height and has 35 floors, making it one of the largest in the country and one of the more modern high-rises in Latin America. In 2006, the building was sold to Banco Itaú, prior to which time BankBoston company had merged with Fleet Bank, and ceased to exist as a separate entity. Today, some people call it an Edifício Itaú Bank.

== Start of construction ==
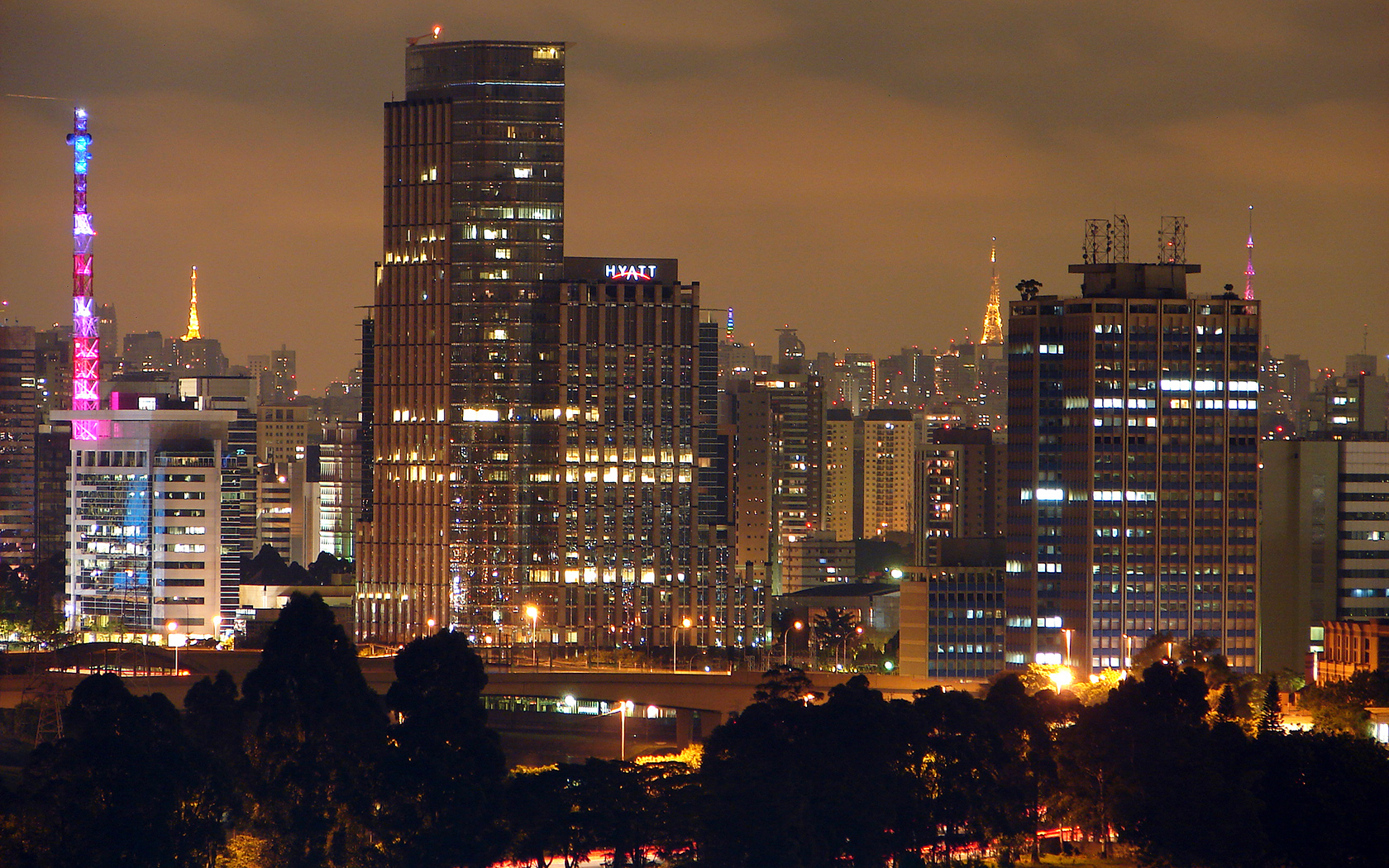
View Sede do BankBoston at Night

The builder Hochtief, the German capital, was chosen to build the new Brazilian offices of BankBoston, on the ground located on the Marginal Pinheiros São Paulo. The project's financial institution demand the investment of about $65 million, according to Manager of New Business Development of Hochtief, Léo Teixeira. The future of BankBoston headquarters occupy an area of 30 square meters and will have 25 floors. According to the institution, the work began in May 1999 and finished in 28 months, concluding in 2002. Next to the bank building will be constructed a network Hyatt hotel, the United States and one office tower of the ACD, the company's former shareholder of Pão de Açúcar Group Alcides Diniz. The plot of land which will house the condominium, next to the new headquarters of Rede Globo, was owned by Diniz, that the area received as compensation for the purpose of the company in. The architectural design of the condominium was headed by Julio Neves, who did not want to comment on the project.

== Architecture ==
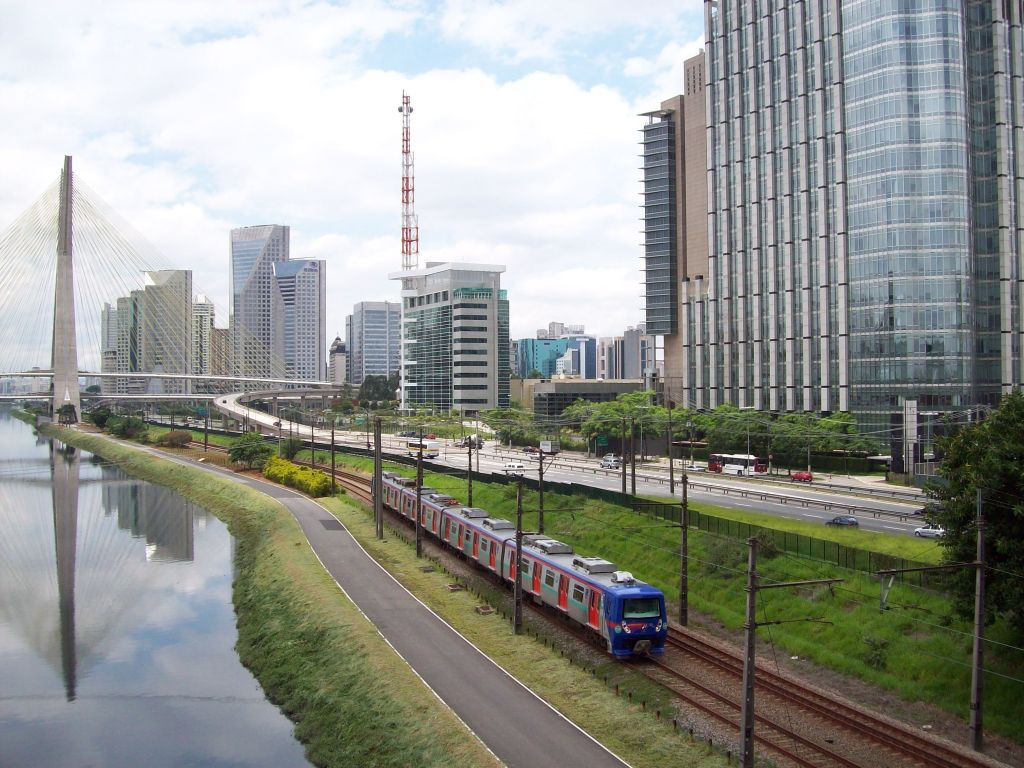
View Sede do BankBoston and Marginal Pinheiros

The Sede do BankBoston is one of the works of architecture and engineering more complex and innovative built on Brazilian soil in recent years. The complex, with its important green area, near the building and its surroundings. The geometric concept of the tower and the pedestrian areas to form a background to scan the landscape. The area of the building houses offices used by 3000 employees, and 8% for the same individuals. 10% of built area refers to the meeting rooms and common areas. The total space is used for banking, commercial and administrative. There is also a cafeteria with a capacity for 500 people, auditorium with 300 seats and center meetings. The tower, designed as a facade in staggered form, is composed of granite, metal and glass. Its structure, cast in sit concrete beams with protestations, creates modern silhouette and distinct profile in the city.

== See also ==
- List of tallest buildings in South America
- List of tallest buildings in Brazil
- Altino Arantes Building
- Mirante do Vale

Records
Preceded by Plaza Centenário	Modern Skyscraper of Brazil; 145 m 2002—2007	Succeeded by Eldorado Business Tower
Preceded by Telecommunications Tower (Montevideo)	Modern Skyscraper of South America; 145 m 2002—2005	Succeeded by El Faro Towers
