= List of tallest buildings in São Paulo =

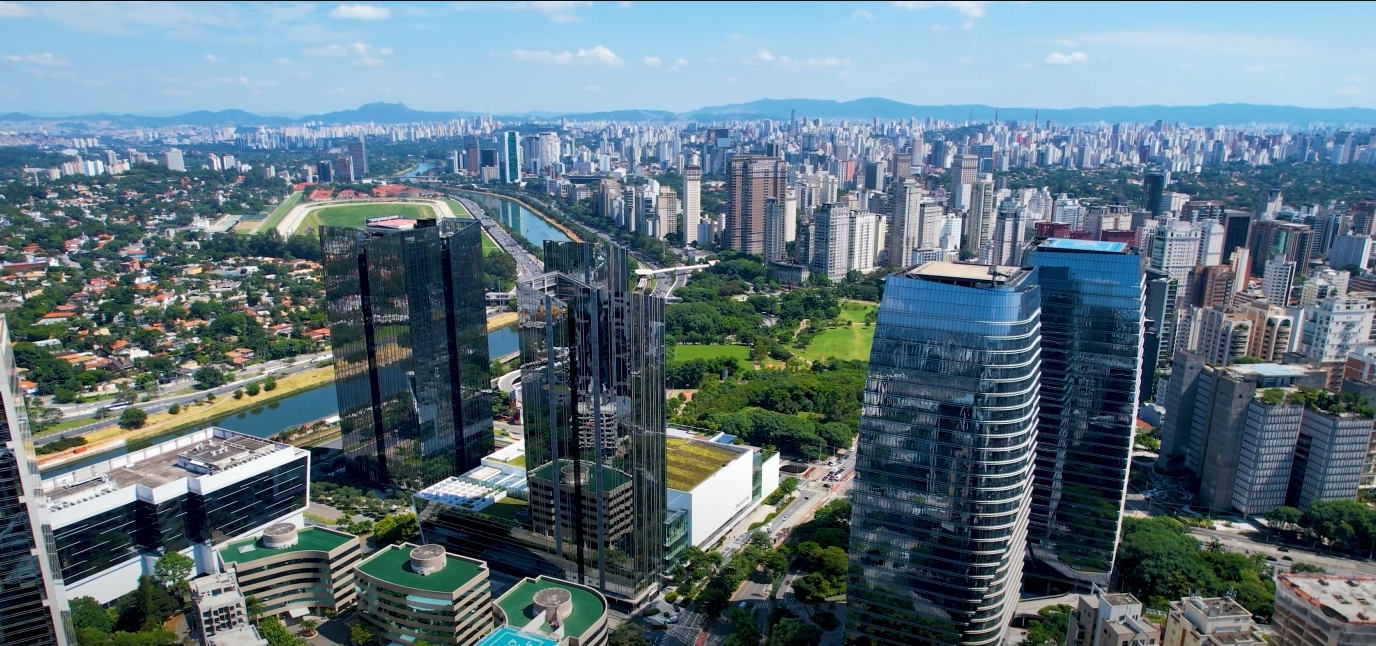
Skyline of São Paulo in the Itaim Bibi region, with highlights on Marginal Pinheiros, WTorre Plaza and São Paulo Corporate Towers

This is a list of skyscrapers in São Paulo, the largest city in Brazil, the American continent, and the Western and Southern Hemispheres. Within the city, there are nearly ten thousand tall buildings (over 35 metres (115 ft) or consisting of 12 floors), of which 152 are buildings above 100 metres (339 ft) and 18 are skyscrapers above 150 metres (490 ft). It is the fourth city with the largest number of buildings and one of the cities with the most skyscrapers in the world. During the 20th century, São Paulo played a prominent role in the country's civil construction (remaining to this day), with many of its new buildings having ranked first among the tallest skyscrapers in the country and Latin America, and represented a milestone in modern Brazilian architecture, with many of its buildings protected by the Historical Heritage and listed by CONPRESP (Municipal Council for the Preservation of the Historical Heritage of São Paulo) due to their "importance, historical, social and urbanistic value".

The history of verticalization in São Paulo began in the 1920s, with the construction of the Sampaio Moreira Building in 1924, measuring 50 meters in height and 12 floors, a novelty for the time. Also that year, construction began on the Martinelli Building (105 meters), which was inaugurated unfinished in 1929, in order to compete with the A Noite Building (102 meters) in Rio de Janeiro and receive the title of tallest building in the country and Latin America, which continued until the construction of the Kavanagh Building (120 meters) in Buenos Aires in 1936. The title of tallest skyscraper in Latin America returned to São Paulo with the inauguration of the Altino Arantes Building (161 meters in height and 35 floors), built in 1947 and the largest reinforced concrete building in the world and the tallest building on the planet outside the United States.

In 1960, construction began on the Mirante do Vale, which was completed in 1966. At 170 meters high and with 51 floors, it became the tallest building in the city and stood out for having been the tallest in Brazil for 48 years until 2014 (being the building that remained in that position for the longest time). Also in 1966, the Edifício Copan (115 meters) was inaugurated, a symbol of the city and of modern Brazilian architecture, since it did not follow the straight pattern of the other neighboring buildings and was designed with sinuous curves by Oscar Niemeyer. Numerous new skyscrapers were built in that decade, such as the Edifício Itália (165 meters), and in the years that followed; however, due to the fires that occurred in the Andraus and Joelma buildings in the 1970s, the height limit for buildings was inhibited and the city did not have any new skyscrapers taller than 160 meters for about four decades. São Paulo has had several skyscraper projects that would have been the tallest in the world if they had been completed, such as the Maharishi São Paulo Tower (510 meters), which would surpass the Petronas Towers; the Landmark Tower (695 meters) and the Órbita Residence (1.1 kilometers). In 2021, the Figueira Altos do Tatuapé (168 meters and 50 floors) was inaugurated, the taller residential building and the fourth-tallest building in the city. Also in March of the same year, the Platina 220 took the top spot as the tallest building in São Paulo when it reached its maximum height of 172 meters (more than fifty years after the completion of the Mirante do Vale), a title that lasted until May 2025, when the corporate tower of the Alto das Nações complex; still under construction, it reached its final 219 meters, and also became the tallest multipurpose corporate tower in Brazil. New buildings are under construction, such as Parque Global (composed of five residential towers, one of which will be 173 meters high) and the residential buildings Cyrela Pininfarina Rebouças (210 meters) and Vista Cyrela Furnished By Armani/Casa (206 meters).

The city's skyline has often been listed as one of the most impressive, relevant and well-known in the world, with a large number of high-end, class A, AA and AAA (triple A) and sustainable buildings located in regions such as Avenida Paulista, Avenida Faria Lima, Brooklin, Berrini, Chucri Zaidan, Itaim Bibi, Centro and Pinheiros, such as Cidade Matarazzo (+100 meters), RochaVerá Plaza Torre C (134 meters), Faria Lima Plaza (126 meters), Torre Matarazzo (125 meters), among many others. According to the German company Emporis, in a survey carried out every two years on the most impressive skylines in the world, São Paulo ranked fifth in 2011; seventh in 2013; in 2015, ninth; the following year, it was again included in the same publication of the company, and is currently among the top ten.

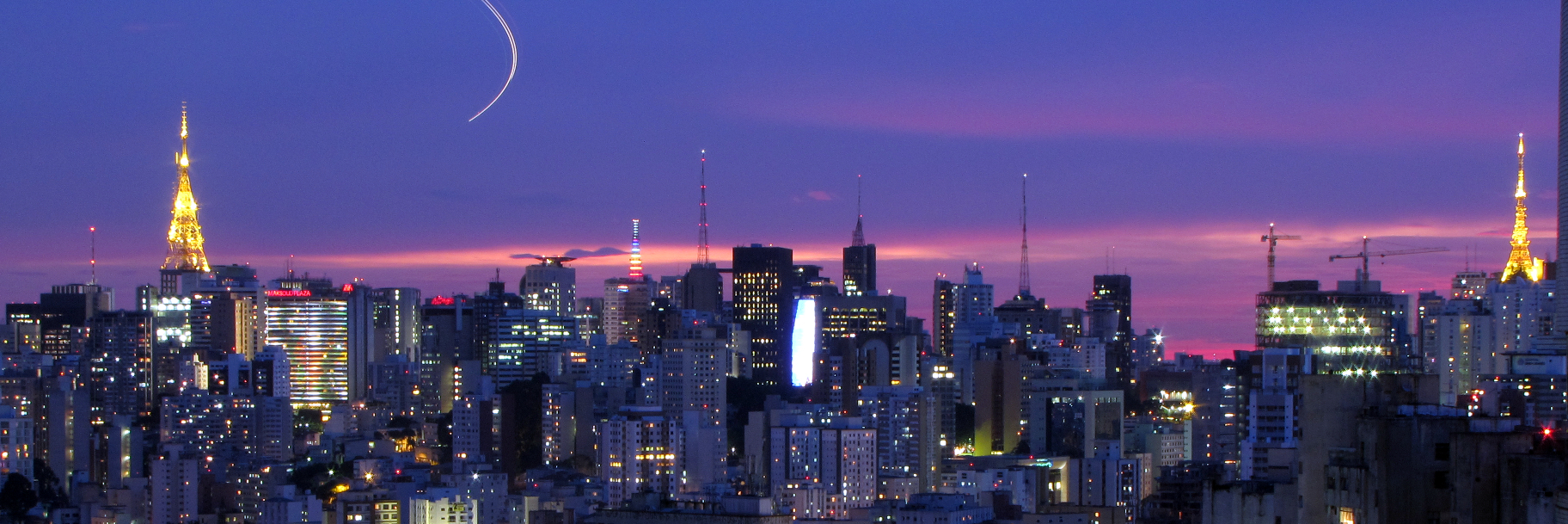
Partial view of the Bela Vista district from the Copan Building.

== Tallest buildings ==
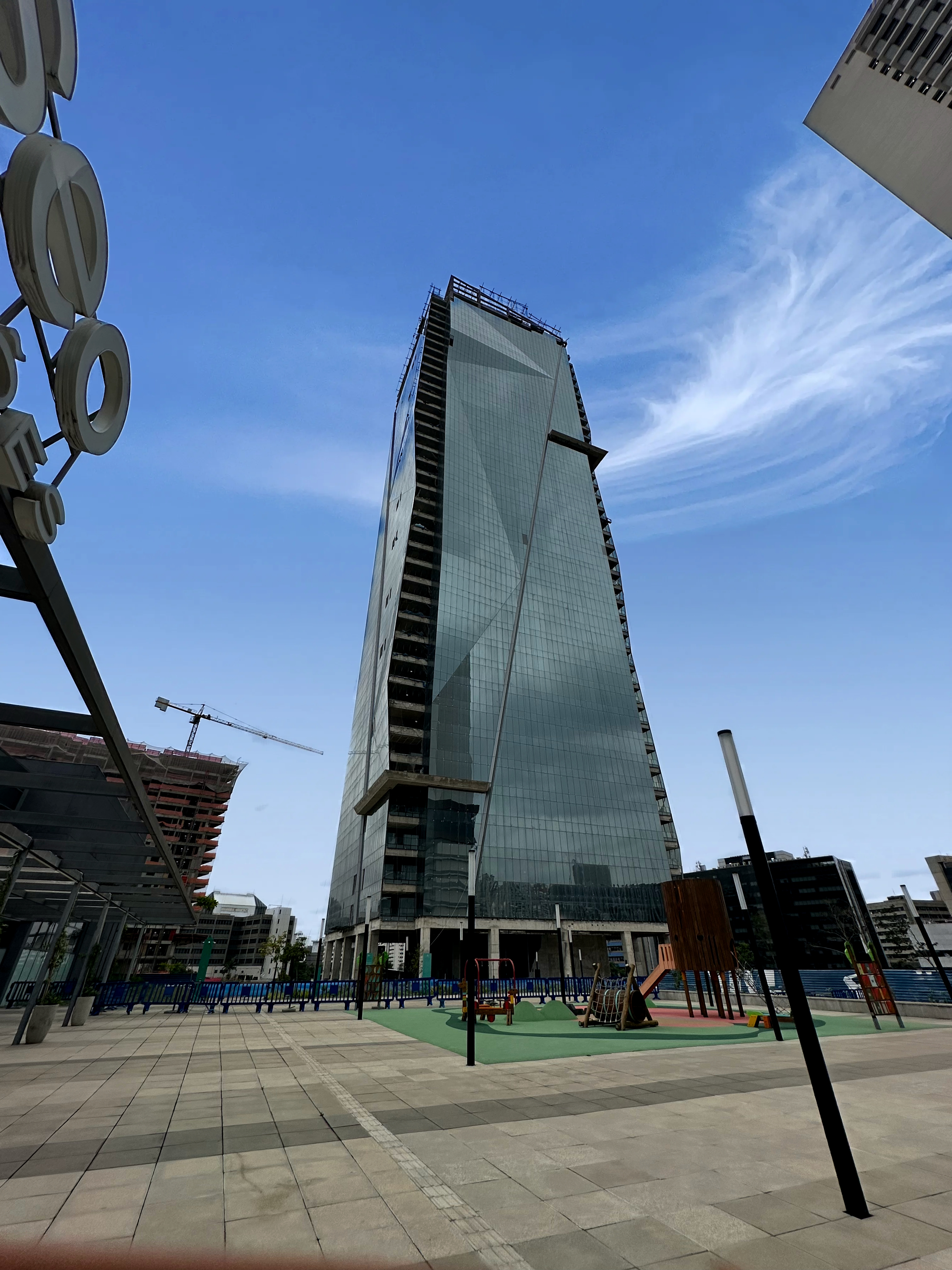
Alto das Nações, the tallest in São Paulo

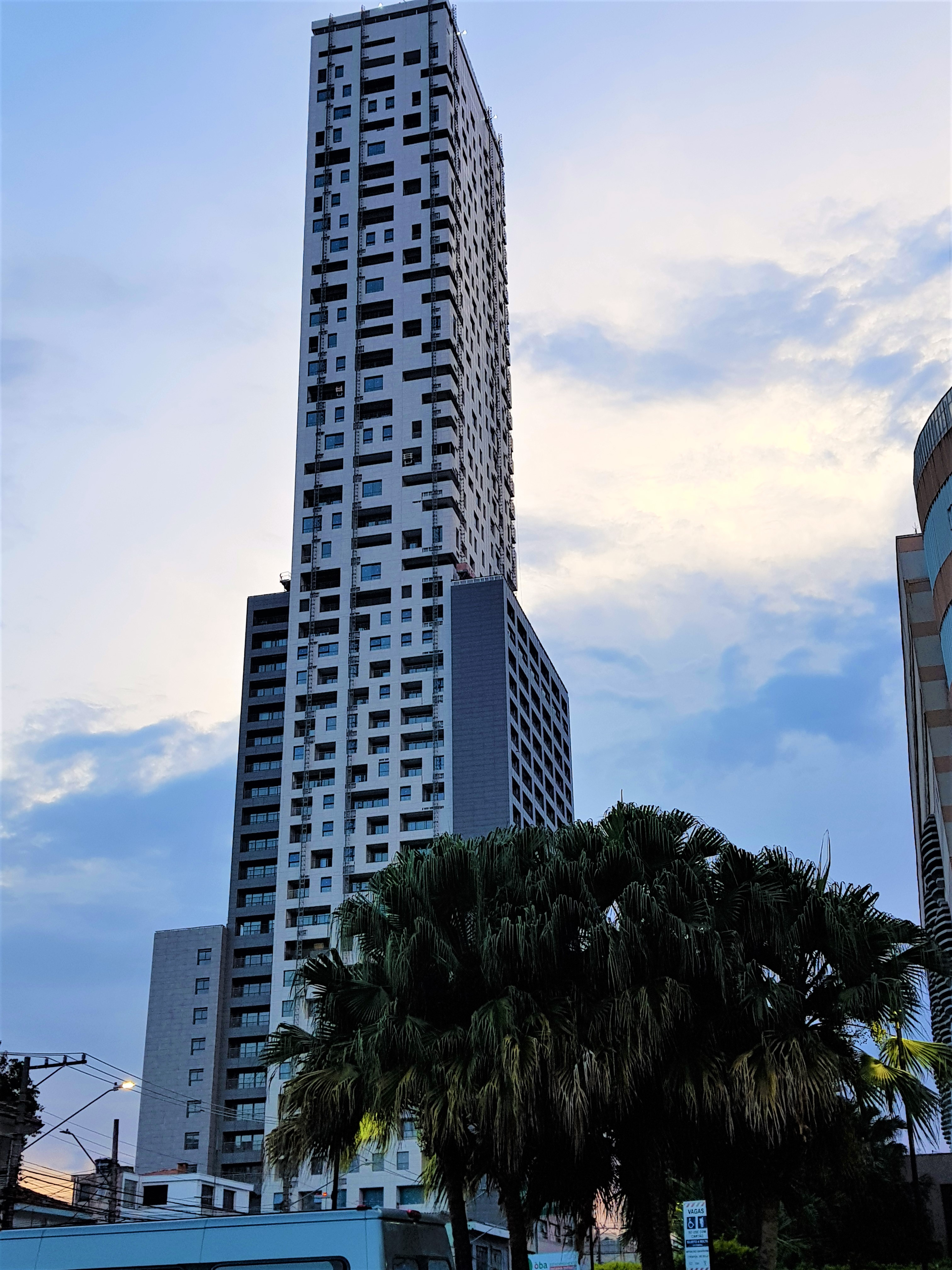
Platina 220, the second tallest

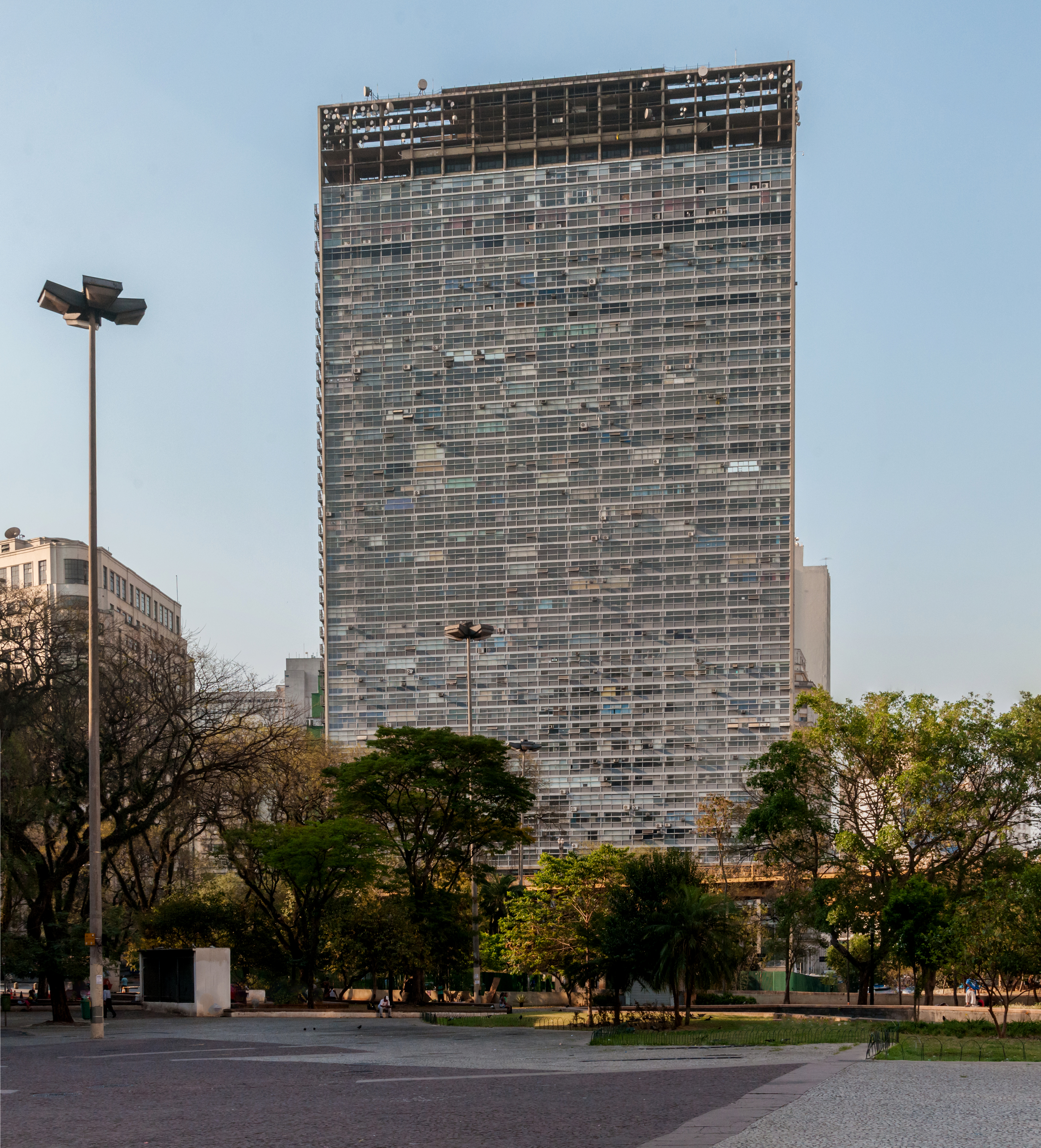
Mirante do Vale, the third tallest skyscraper

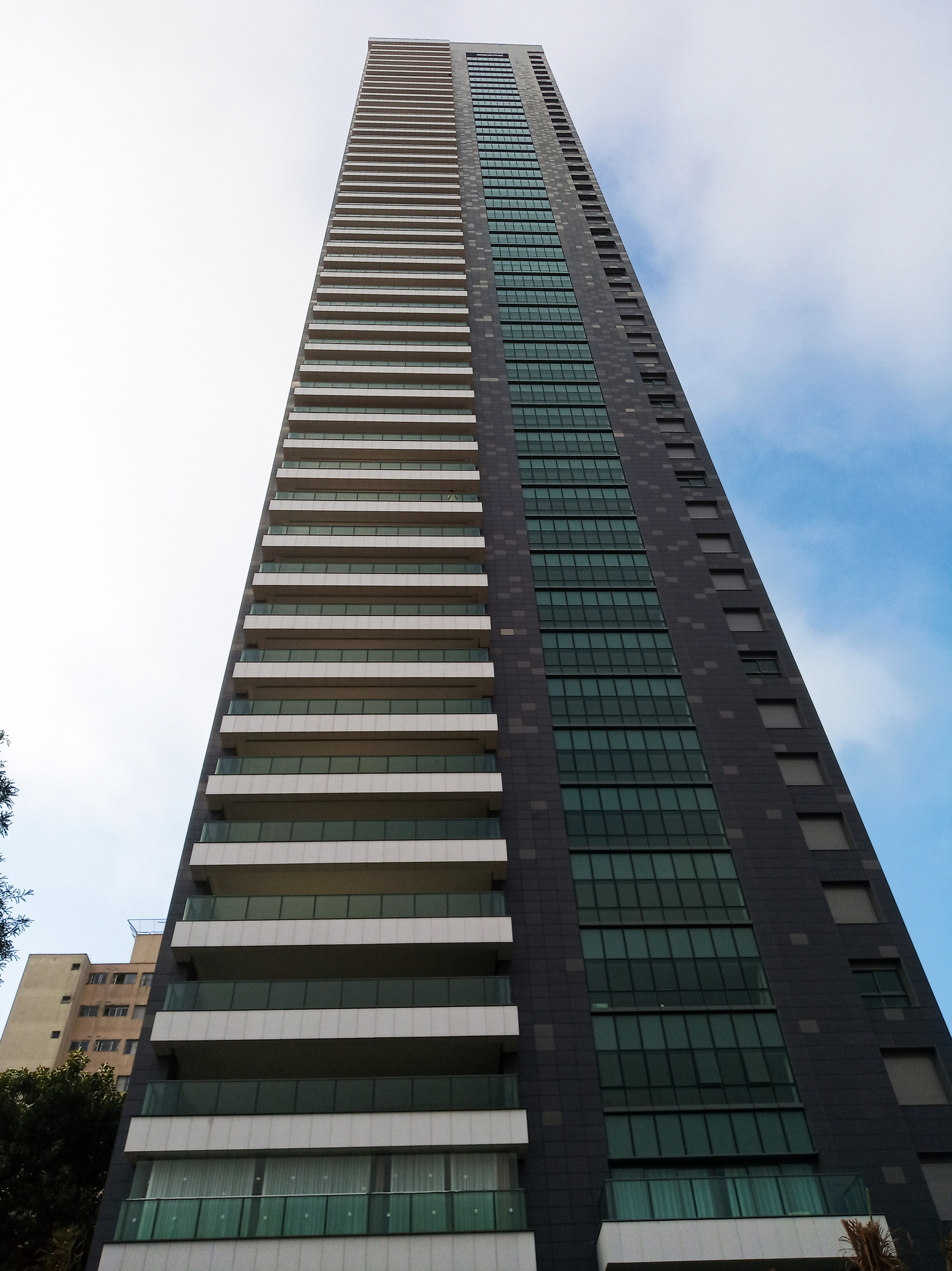
Figueira Altos do Tatuapé, the tallest residential building and fourth largest building in the city

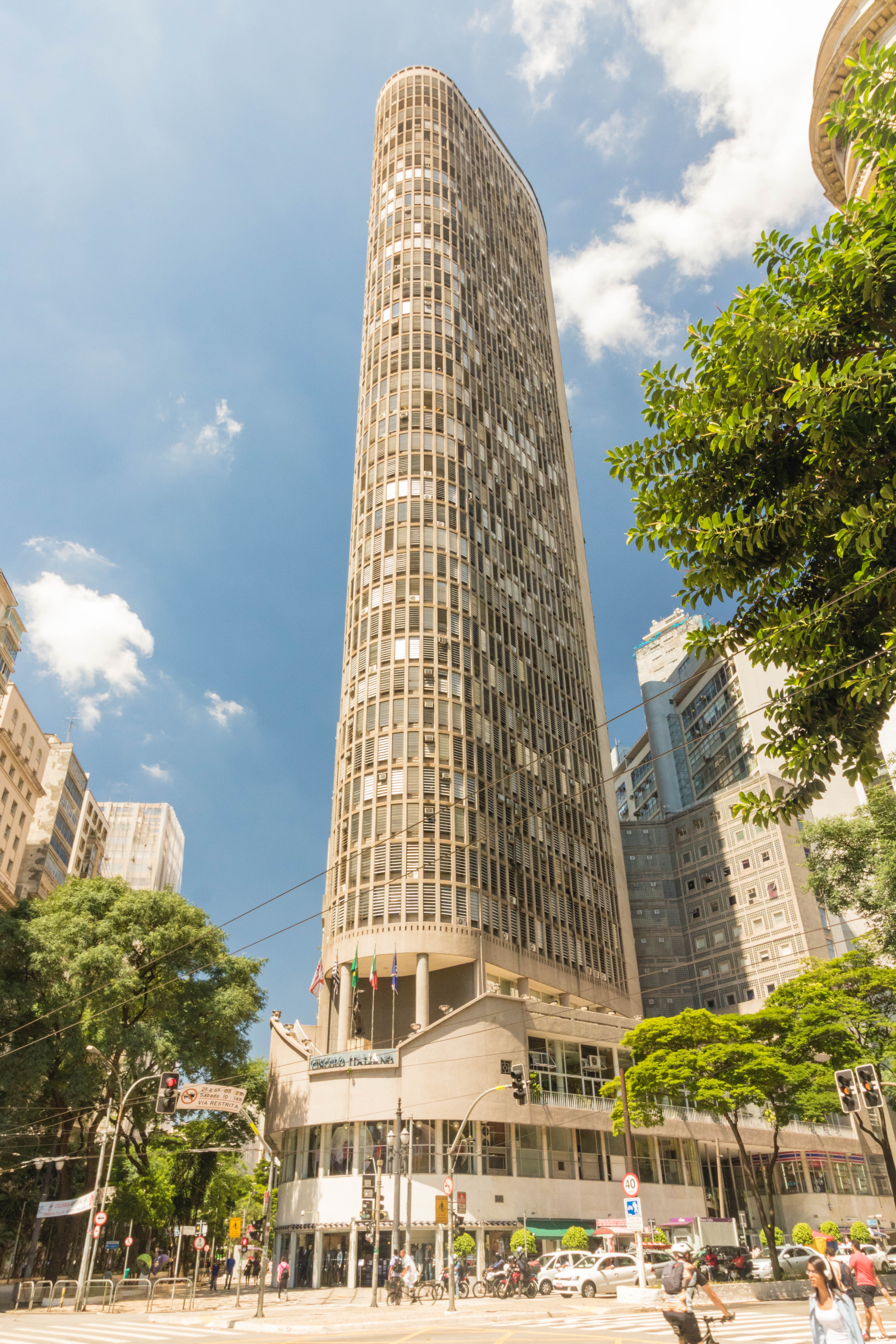
The Edifício Itália ranks fifth position

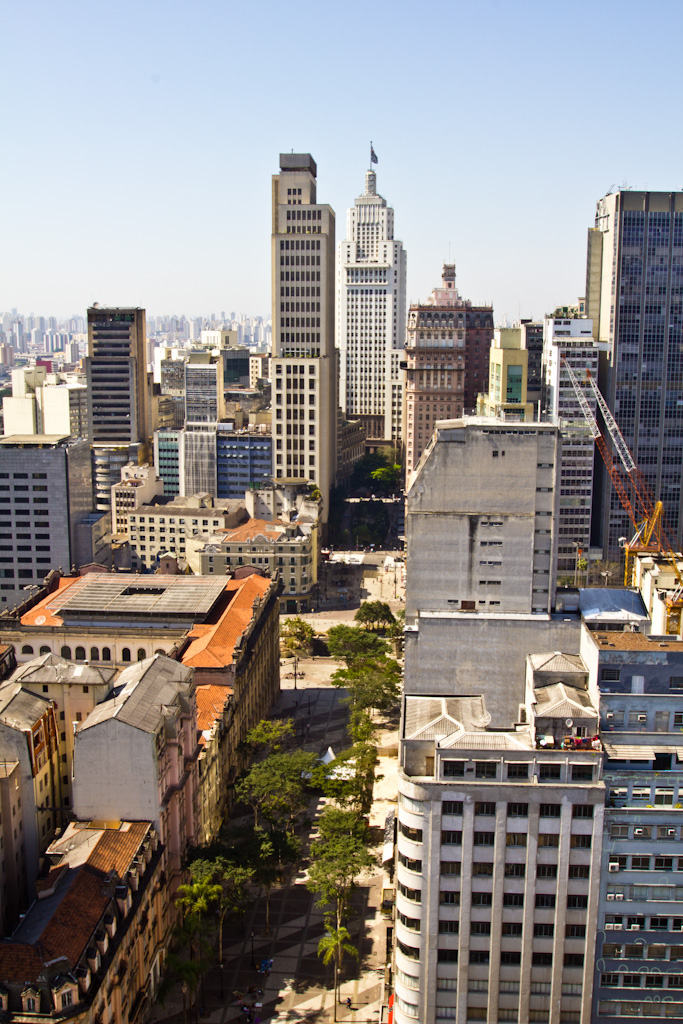
Altino Arantes Building (center), considered a symbol of the city

This list ranks the 100 tallest skyscrapers in São Paulo (residential and/or commercial/office), including the height in meters and feet and the classification of each building. The tallest is Alto das Nações (219 meters), and the smallest (among the tallest) is 100 meters tall (364 feet).

Indicates buildings still under construction that have been architecturally topped out but not yet fully opened

Rank	Name	Height		Floors	Year
Rank	Name	Meters	Feet	Floors	Year
1	Alto das Nações	219	718	45	2026
2	Platina 220	172	564	50	2022
3	Mirante do Vale	170	558	51	1960
4	Figueira Altos do Tatuapé	168	556	52	2021
5	Edifício Itália	165	556	45	1965
6	Edifício Altino Arantes	161	528	35	1947
7	Torre Norte do CENU	158	500	38	1999
8	Parque Cidade Jardim	158	500	41	2008
8	Torre Begônias	158	500	41	2008
8	Torre Jabuticabeiras	158	500	41	2008
8	Torre Magnólias	158	500	41	2008
8	Torre Resedá	158	500	41	2008
8	Torre Ipês	158	500	41	2009
8	Torre Zíneas	158	500	41	2009
8	Torre Limantos	158	500	41	2010
16	Josephine	150	492	41	2014
17	EZ Towers - Torre A	150	492	32	2016
17	EZ Towers - Torre B	150	492	32	2016
20	Birmann 21	149	488	26	1997
20	Pq. Gamaro / Torre Folhagem	149	488	44	2024
20	Pq. Gamaro / Torre Pétala	149	488	44	2024
21	E-Tower	148	480	39	2005
22	Eco Berrini	147	482	35	2012
23	Sede do BankBoston	145	476	35	2002
24	W Hotel & Residences São Paulo	145	475	40	2025
25	Emiliano Anália Franco	143	469	41	2013
26	Pç. Henrique Monteiro / Pulso Hotel	142	467	39	2024
27	Canário	141	462	40	2010
27	Inhambú	141	462	40	2010
29	WTorre Morumbi	141	462	34	2014
30	Eldorado Business Tower	140.9	462	36	2007
31	Berrini 1	139	455	34	2014
32	Plaza Centenário	139	455	34	1995
33	São Paulo Corporate Towers (South)	139	452	30	2016
33	São Paulo Corporate Towers (North)	139	452	30	2016
35	Ed. Katherine Mansfield	139	452	39	2013
36	Edifício Mandarim	137	452	41	2006
37	WTorre JK / Torre Santander	136	446.3	34	2009
38	Brookfield Towers	135	443	35	2017
39	Rochaverá Corporate Towers	134	440	33	2012
40	Hospital Sírio-Libanês (Bela Vista)	133	439	27	2015
41	Seridó 106	133	439	36	2012
42	Edifício Barão de Iguape	133	436	37	1959
43	Helen Altos do Tatuapé	133	436	37	2018
44	Complexo JK / Torre 1	132	433	30	2012
45	Horizonte JK	131	431	42	2015
46	Edifício TJSP	130	427	36	1968
47	Heritage Cyrela	130	427	33	2020
48	Tower Bridge Corporate	130	427	30	2012
49	WTorre JK / Torre 2	130	427	26	2012
50	Edifício Grande São Paulo	129	423	40	1971
51	Flórida Penthouses A	129	423	40	2008
52	Mercantil Finasa	129	423	35	1973
53	Morumbi Corporate Golden Tower	126	413	29	2013
54	Faria Lima Plaza	126	413	22	2021
55	Birmann 32	125.6	412	27	2020
56	Ciragan	125	410	42	2007
57	JW Marriott São Paulo	125	410	31	2018
58	H.I Pinheiros	125	410	38	2025
59	Instituto Doutor Arnaldo	125	410	25	2007
60	Torre Matarazzo	125	410	22	2015
61	Torre do World Trade Center	124	406	26	1994
62	Torre Tarumã	123.4	405	37	2015
63	Capital Corporate Office	123.2	404	32	2012
64	Edifício Jacarandá	122	418	37	2003
64	Edifício Paineiras	122	418	37	2004
64	Edifício Plátano	122	418	37	2006
67	Casa Grande Bloco A	122	418	37	2003
67	Casa Grande Bloco B	122	418	37	2003
67	Casa Grande Bloco C	122	418	37	-
67	Casa Grande Bloco D	122	418	37	-
71	White 2880	120.2	393	34	2022
72	L'Essence Jardins	120	402	35	2006
73	Torre Leste do CENU	120	400	32	2001
73	Torre Oeste do CENU	120	400	30	1998
75	Lindenberg Alto das Nações	116		38	2025
76	Edifício Copan	115	390	35	1966
77	Edifício Andraus	115	390	32	1962
78	Leeds Hall	114	388	34	2006
79	Edifício Conde de Prates	112	385	33	1955
80	Renaissance São Paulo Hotel	110	380	26	1994
80	CBI Esplanada	110	380	30	1948
80	Centro Cultural Itaú	110	380	14	1993
80	Blue Tree Towers Paulista	110	380	26	2000
84	Brascan Century Plaza Apartments	109	378	33	2002
85	Edifício Martinelli	106	347	30	1929
86	Edifício Chaim Herzsprung	105	370	30	1997
87	Edifício Jacaranda	104	368	27	1988
88	São Paulo Fashion Hall	103	366	25	2003
88	Faria Lima Premium	103	366	28	1988
90	Edifício General Osório	102	365	28	1980
90	Edifício Ribeirão Preto	102	365	27	1986
90	Edifício Barnabé Corréa	102	365	28	1979
90	Plaza Iguatemi Business Center	102	365	21	2001
94	Edifício São Luís Gonzaga	101	363	24	2000
94	Boulevard Sul	101	363	20	2005
96	Torre 2000	100	364	27	2002
96	Conjunto Nacional	100	364	25	1962
96	Palácio Clóvis Ribeiro	100	364	23	1950
99	Continental Office Tower	100	364	18	2003
100	Mirant Vila Madalena	130	426	40	2023

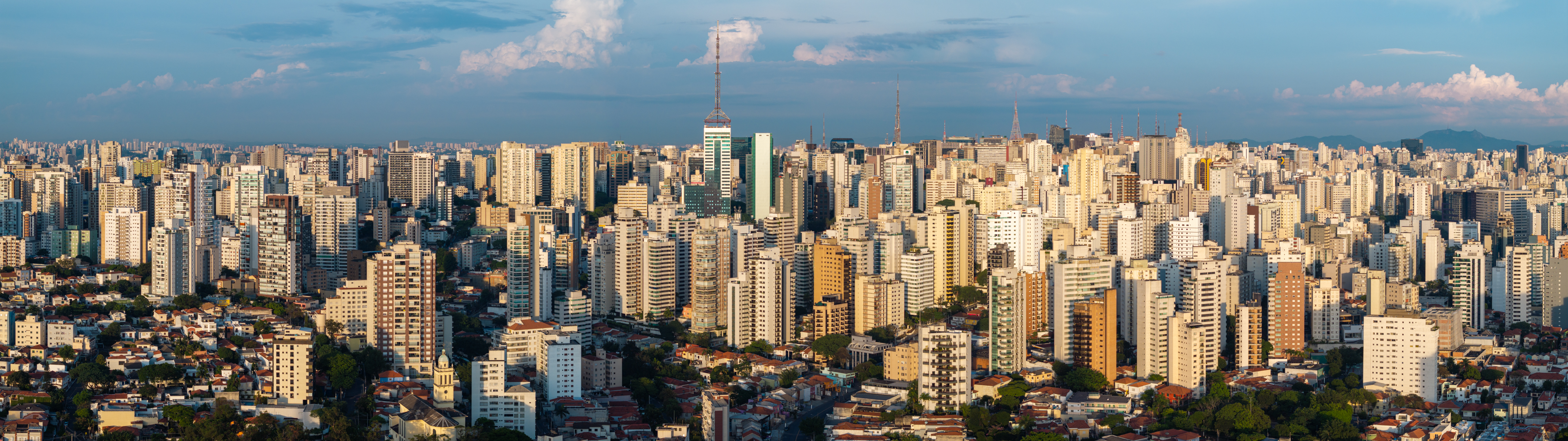
Skyline of São Paulo from Aclimação. In the background, the buildings of Avenida Paulista (Espigão da Paulista), in addition to Pico do Jaraguá on the right of the photograph.

== Tallest building under construction (+100 m) ==
Rank	Name	Floors	Height	Year
1	Torre Alto das Nações	41	219 m 719 ft	≈2025
2-6	Parque Global towers 1–5	5*48	5*153 m 502 ft	2023
7=	O Parque: Torre Petala, torre Folhagem	2×46	2×≈149 m 489 ft	2022

== Select list of Sao Paulo buildings above 20 floors ==
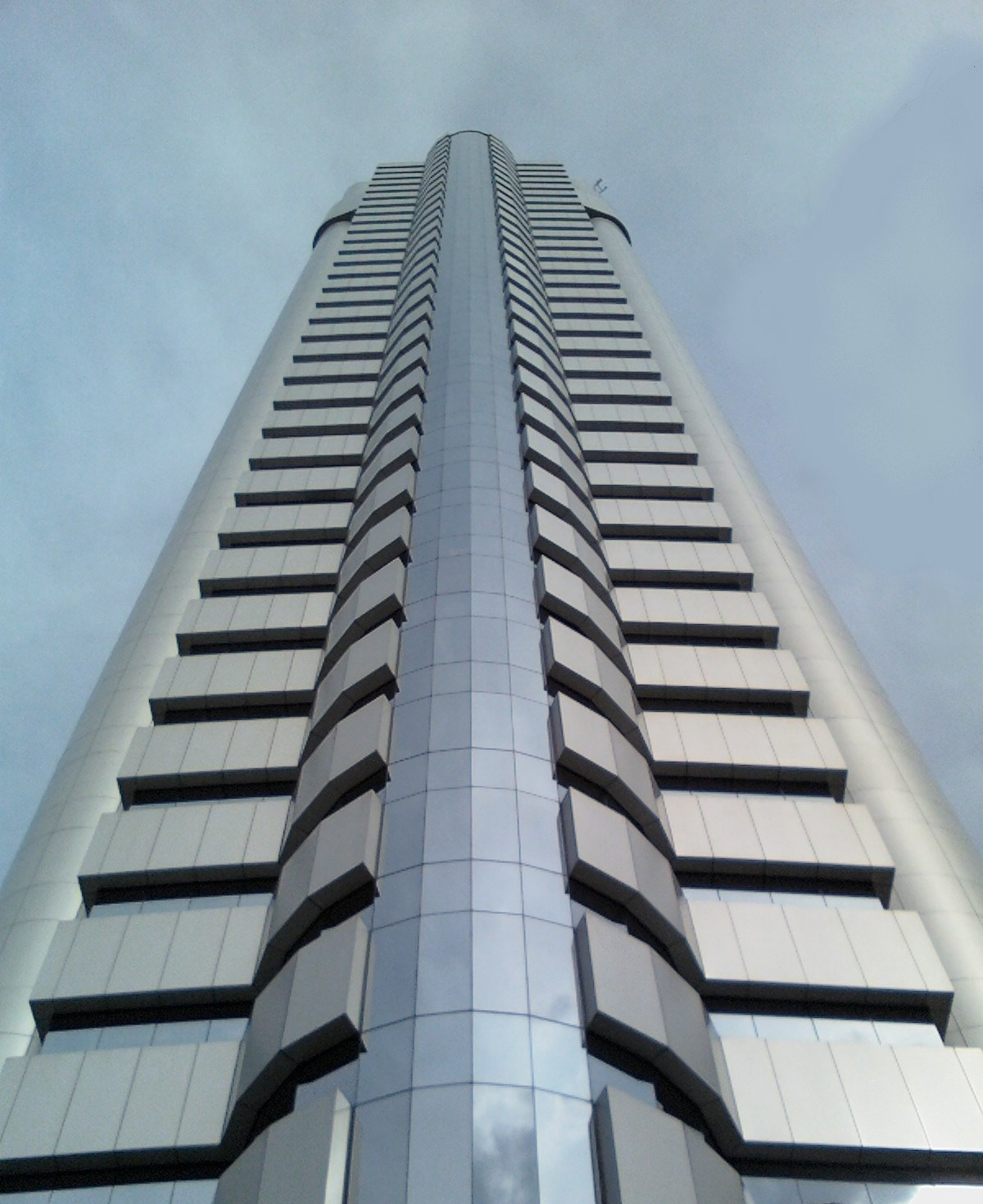
Plaza Centenário

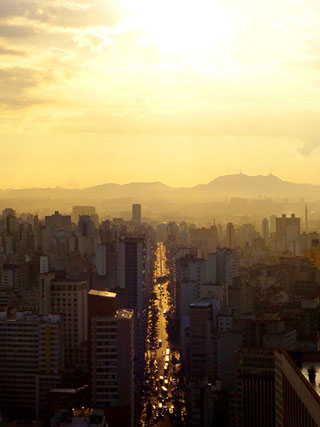
Avenida São João

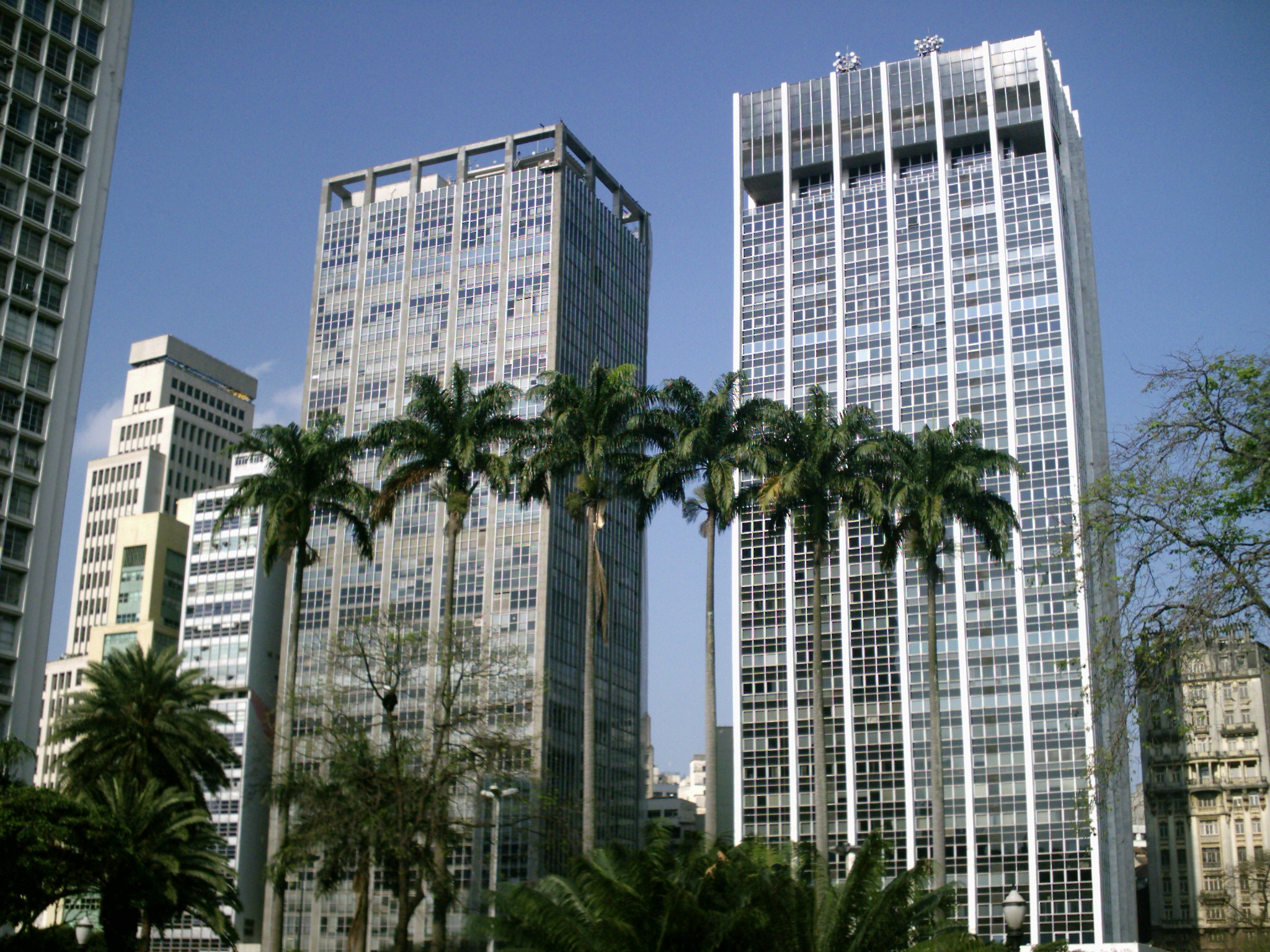
Mercantil Finasa and Grande São Paulo

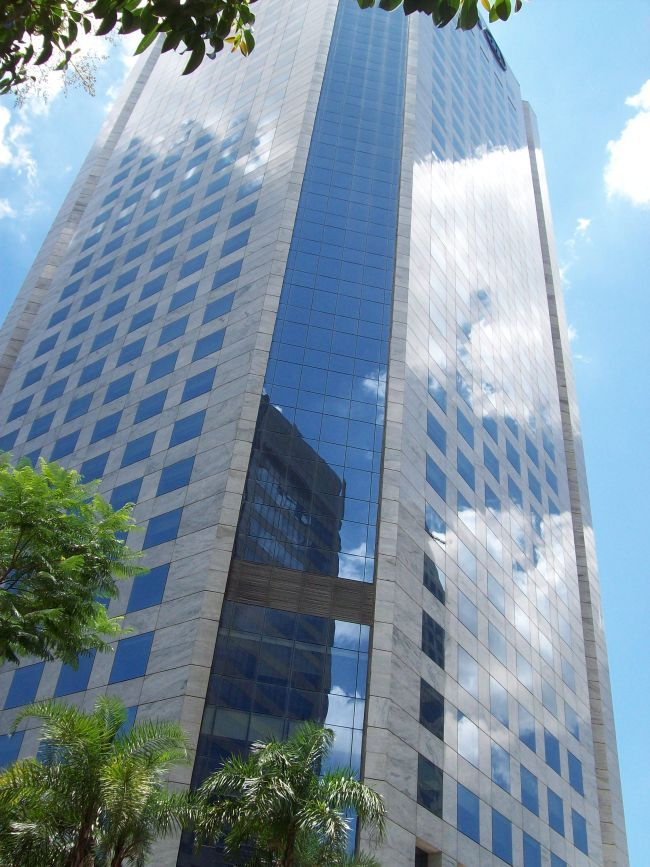
Torre Leste of CENU

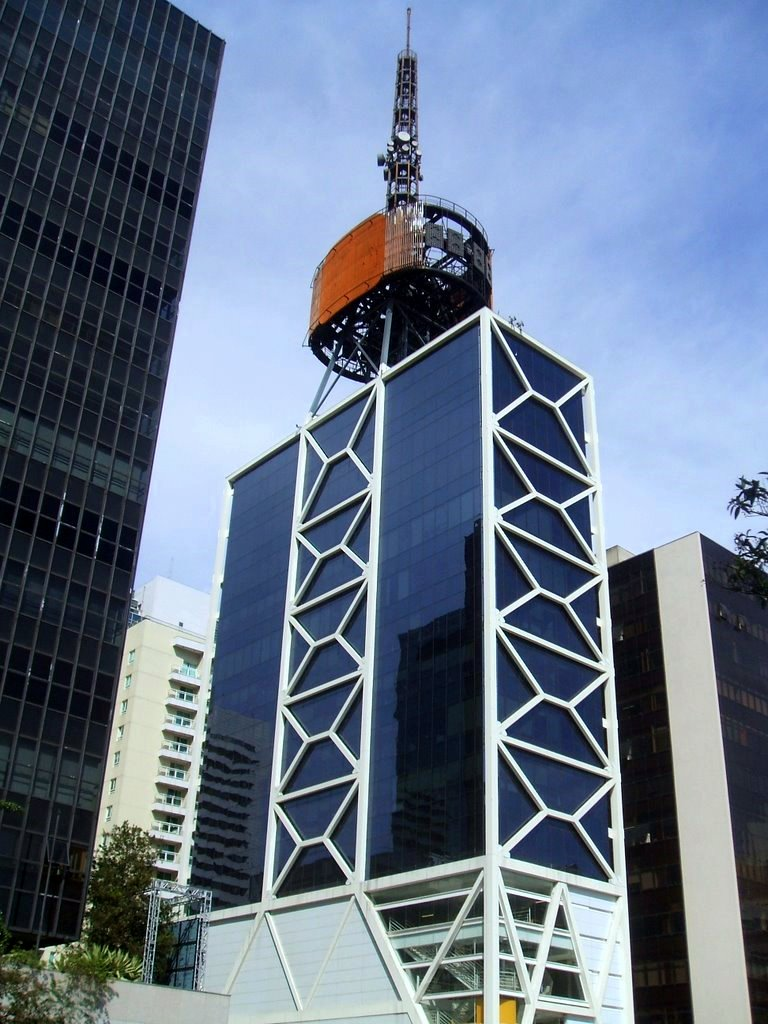
Centro Cultural Itaú

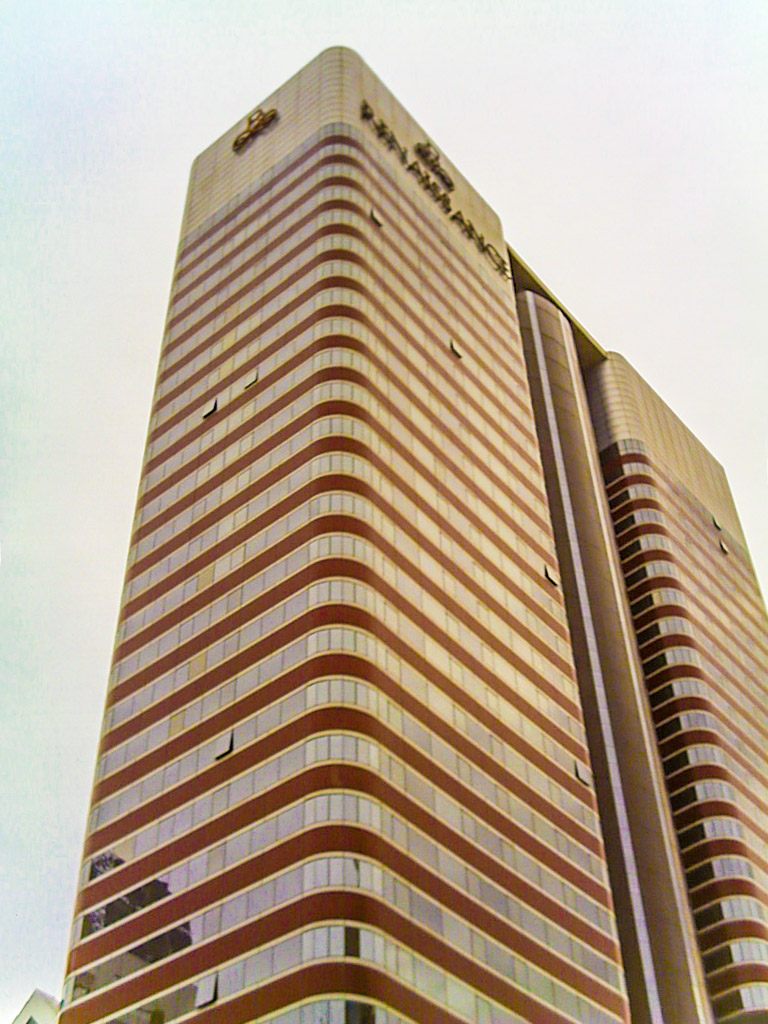
Renaissance São Paulo Hotel

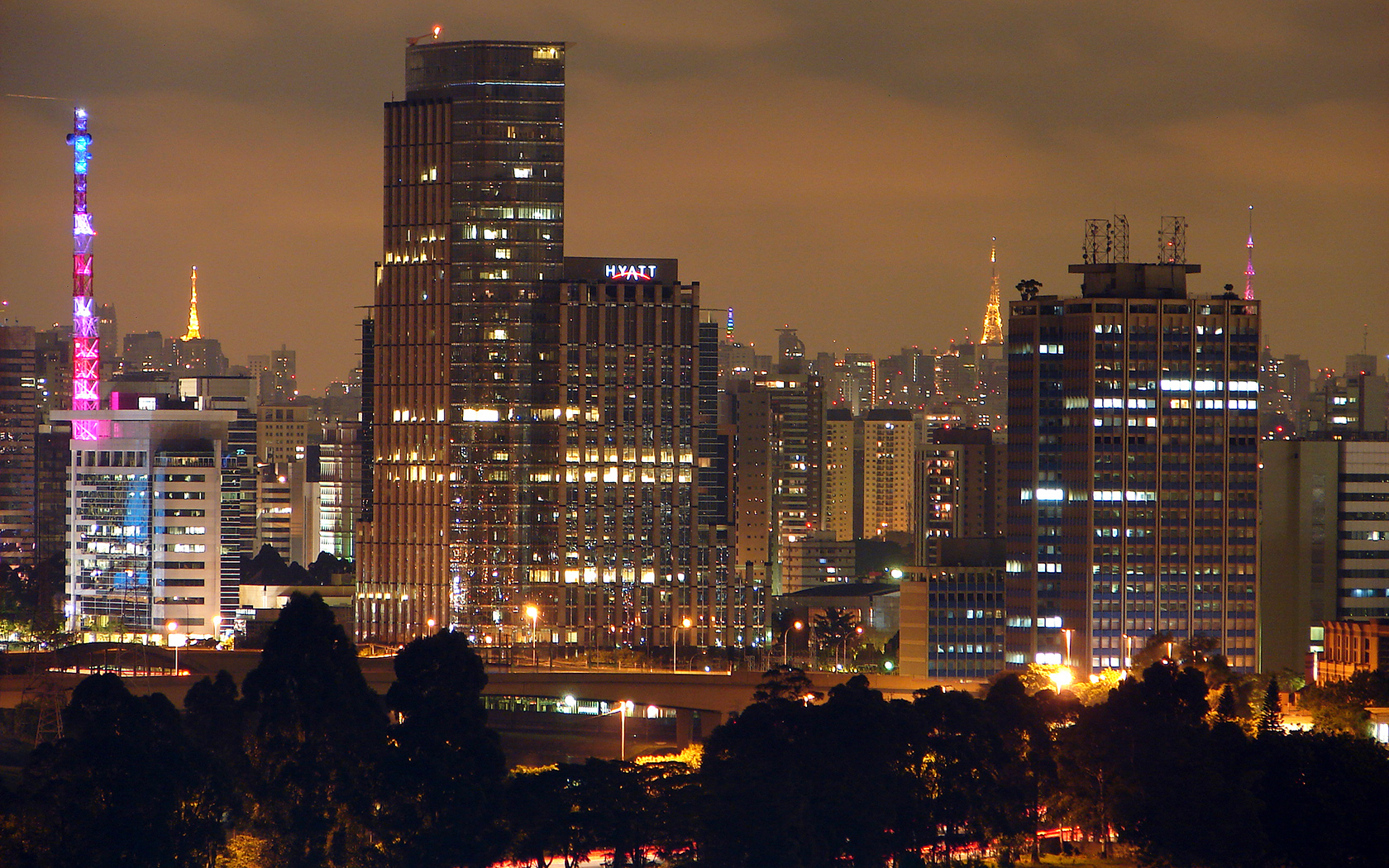
Headquarters Organizações Globo and Sede do BankBoston

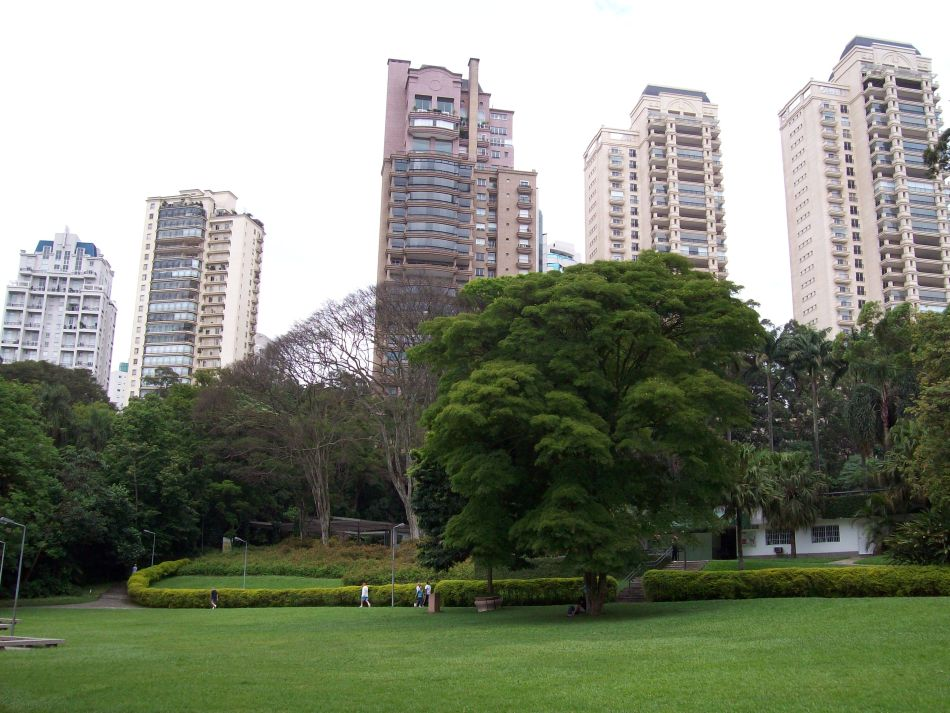
Panamby, residential neighbourhood

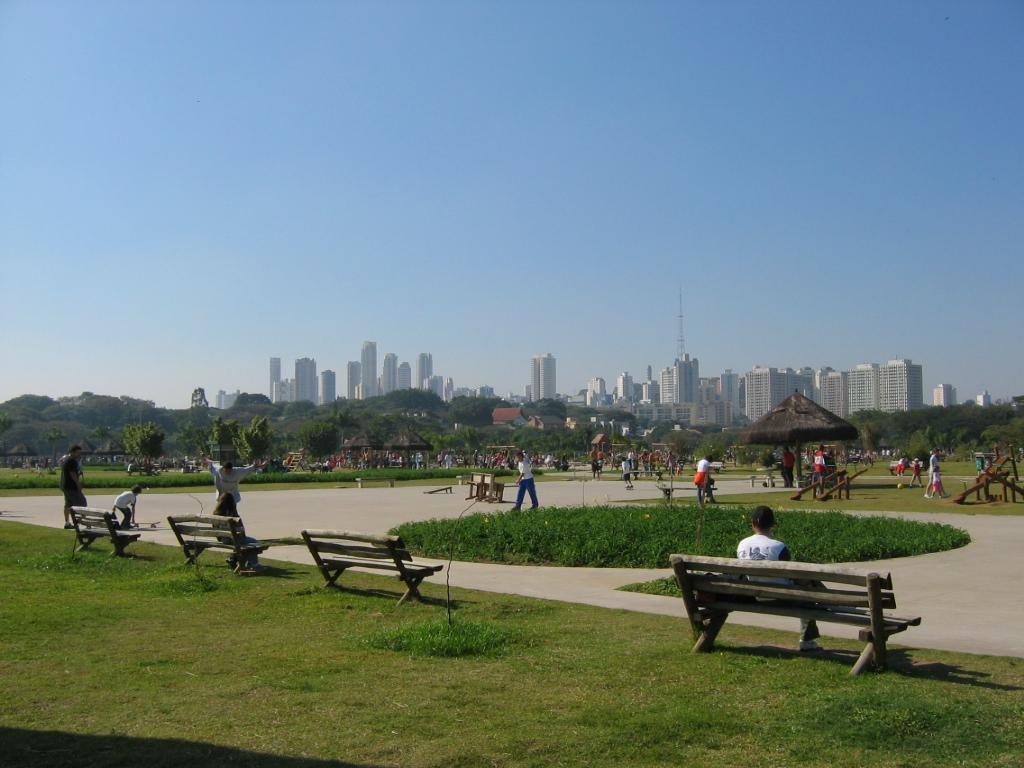
Skyline of Brooklin

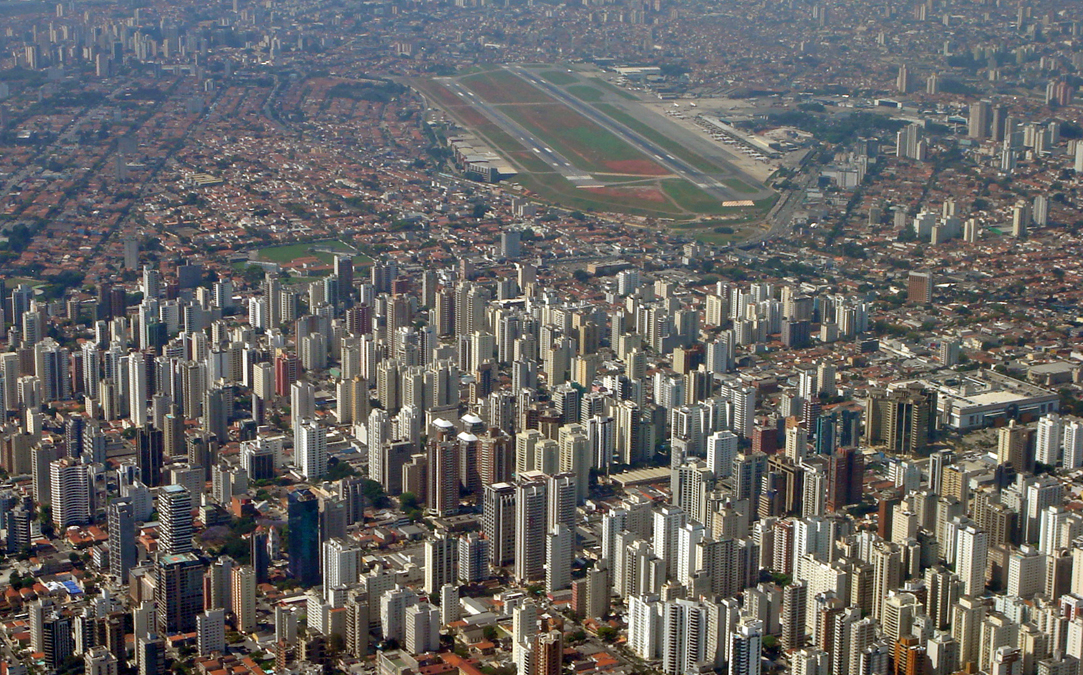
Buildings in Moema

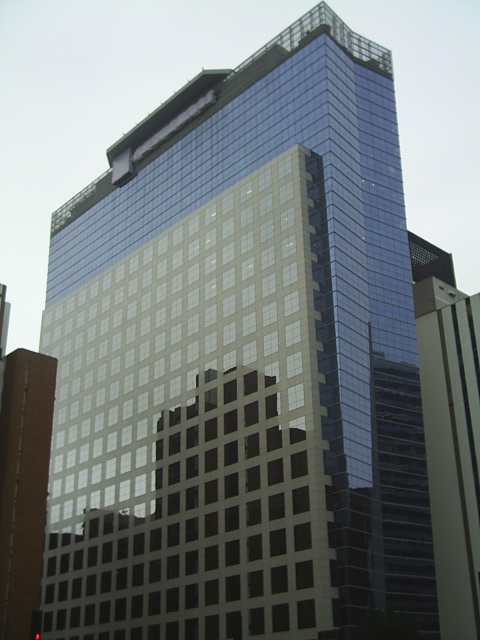
Headquarters Petrobrás

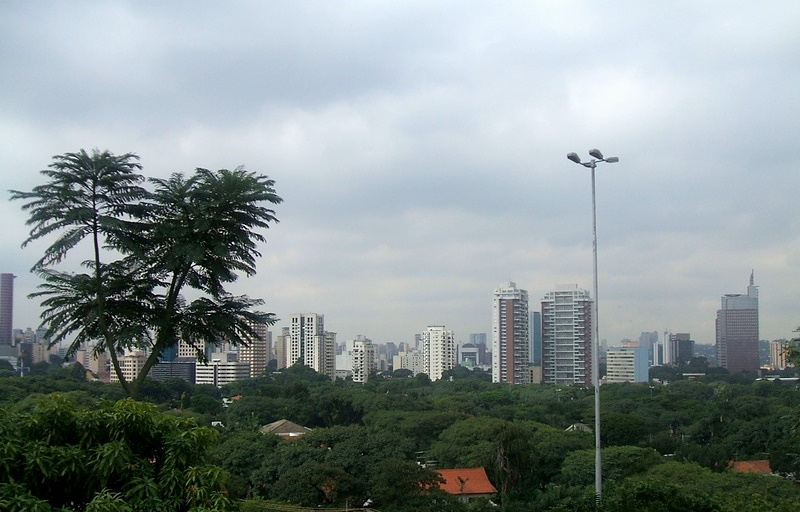
Alto de Pinheiros and Pinheiros neighbourhood

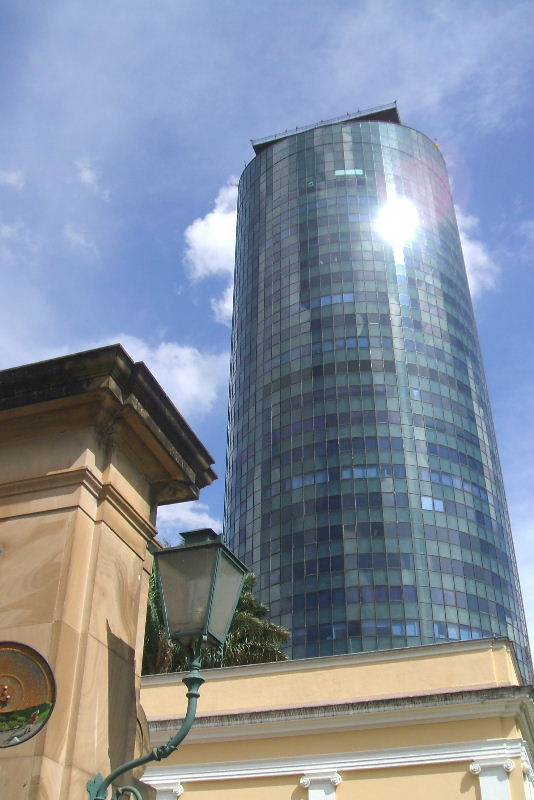
Dacon Building

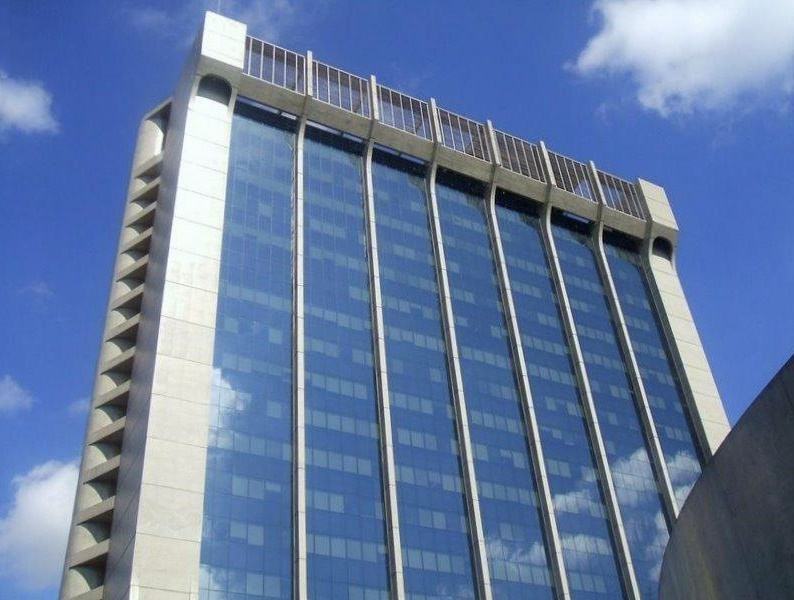
Headquarters IBM

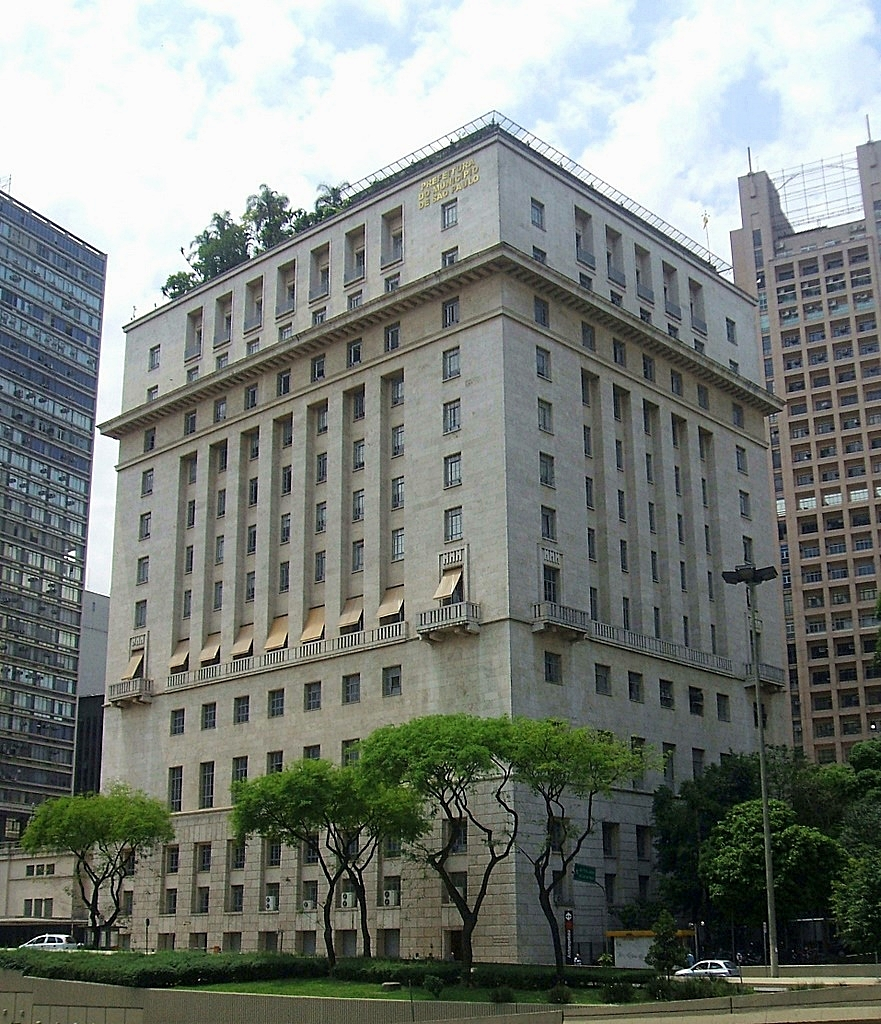
Headquarters of the City Hall of São Paulo

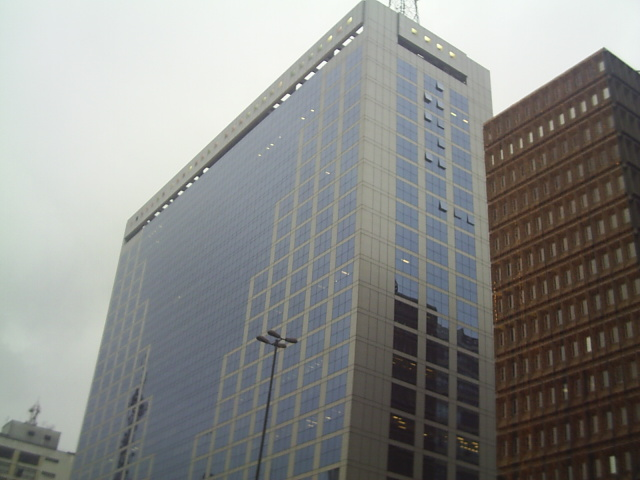
São Luís Gonzaga Building

Name	floors	District/neighborhood
Alto das Nações	41	Zona Sul

== Timeline of tallest buildings ==
The city was at one time the home to the tallest building in Latin America, the Martinelli Building that opened in 1929 at a height of 130 meters (430 ft). The tallest building in the city is the Mirante do Vale, which opened in 1960 at a height of 170 meters (560 ft). At 189 meters (620 ft), the Company Business Towers was planned to become the tallest building in Brazil upon its completion, but the plans were changed and the building was built to a height of only 158 meters (518 ft).

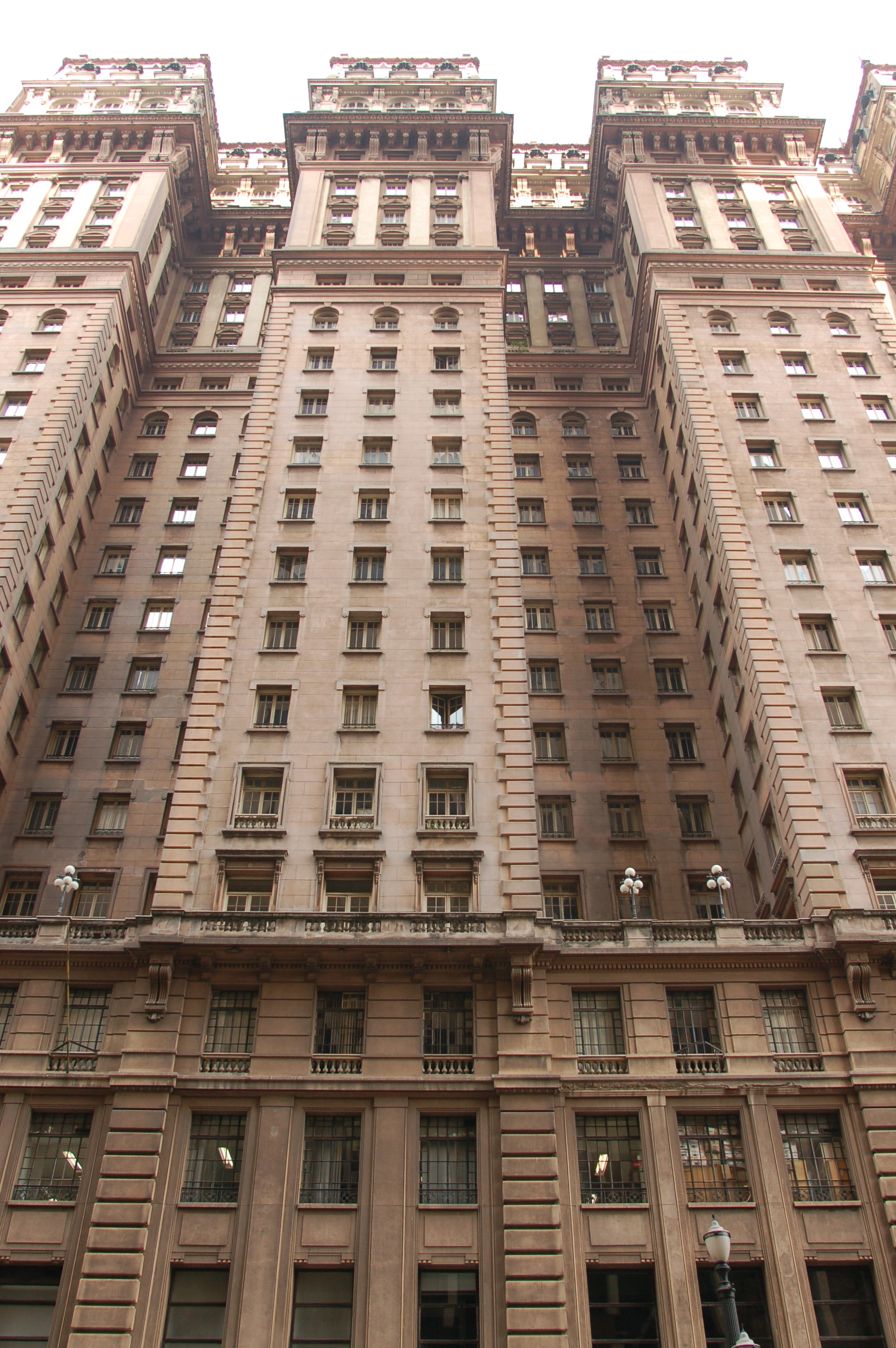
Martinelli Building, the 1st skyscraper in Latin America

Name	Years as tallest	Height	Floors	Neighbourhood
Martinelli Building	1929–1947	105 m 344 ft	30	Sé, Downtown
Altino Arantes Building	1947–1960	161 m 528 ft	35	Sé, Downtown
Mirante do Vale	1960–2022	170 m 560 ft	51	Sé, Downtown
Platina 220	2022–2025	172 m 564 ft	50	Tatuape
Alto das Nações	2025–present	219 m 719 ft	42	South Zone
