= Azevedo Villares Building =

Skyscraper in São Paulo, Brazil

- Edifício Azevedo Villares
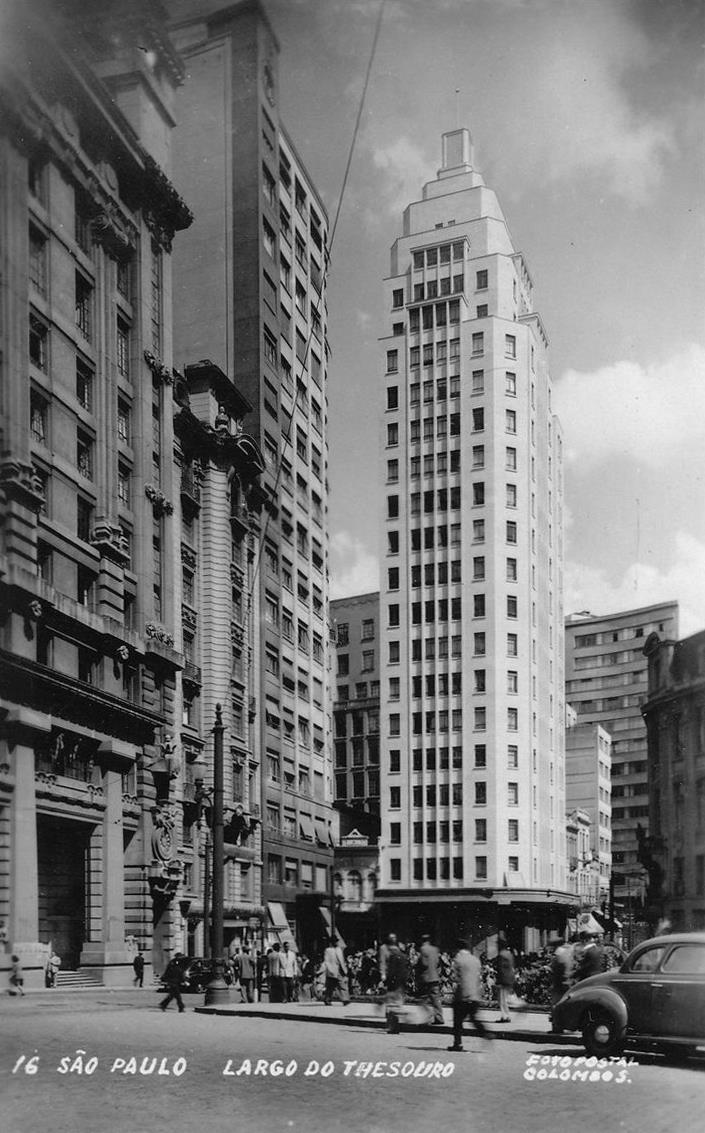
- Vintage view
- Interactive map of the Azevedo Villares Building area

General information
- Location: São Paulo, Brazil
- Coordinates: 23.548264°S 46.634107°W
- Opening: 1943

The Azevedo Villares Building (Portuguese: Edifício Azevedo Villares) is a skyscraper in São Paulo, Brazil.

== History ==
The building was constructed by Severo, Villares & Cia Ltda, a construction company founded by associates of Brazilian architect Ramos de Azevedo, being one of the firm's last major projects. Designed as an income-producing office building for the Villares family, it was inaugurated in 1943.

The building was listed in 2007.

== Description ==
The building occupies a corner lot at the intersection of Rua do Tesouro and Rua Quinze de Novembro, in the Sé district of central São Paulo.

Designed in the Art Deco style, the building is distinguished by its slender, tapering profile. It rises 21 storeys and features a double-height entrance lobby finished in marble, stainless steel, and brass. The interior is organized around open-plan floor layouts with ceiling heights of approximately 3.5 metres and large windows, while vertical circulation is provided by two elevators and a central stairwell.

== See also ==
- List of tallest buildings in São Paulo
