= Company Business Towers =

Brookfield Towers
- Location within São Paulo Location within Brazil

General information
- Type: Office
- Location: São Paulo, Brazil
- Coordinates: 23°38′25.38″S 46°43′20.46″W
- Construction started: 2008
- Estimated completion: 2012
- Opening: 2013

Design and construction
- Architect: Botti Rubin Arquitetos Associados

Company Business Towers is a mixed use commercial development complex (with two towers) in the city of São Paulo, Brazil, that was completed in 2013. In the original plans, one of the two towers would be 189 meters (620 feet) tall and would be the tallest skyscraper in Brazil. The complex comprises high end residential units, commercial office and retail space as well as a hotel.

The project was modified and the tallest tower was not built to the originally intended height. The actual height of the building is 158 m (518 ft). The name of the complex was also modified, and it is currently called Brookfield Towers.

== See also ==
- List of tallest buildings in South America
- List of tallest buildings in Brazil
- Mirante do Vale
- Altino Arantes Building
