= Platina 220 =

Skyscraper in São Paulo, Brazil

Coordinates: 23.5426708°S 46.5773641°W

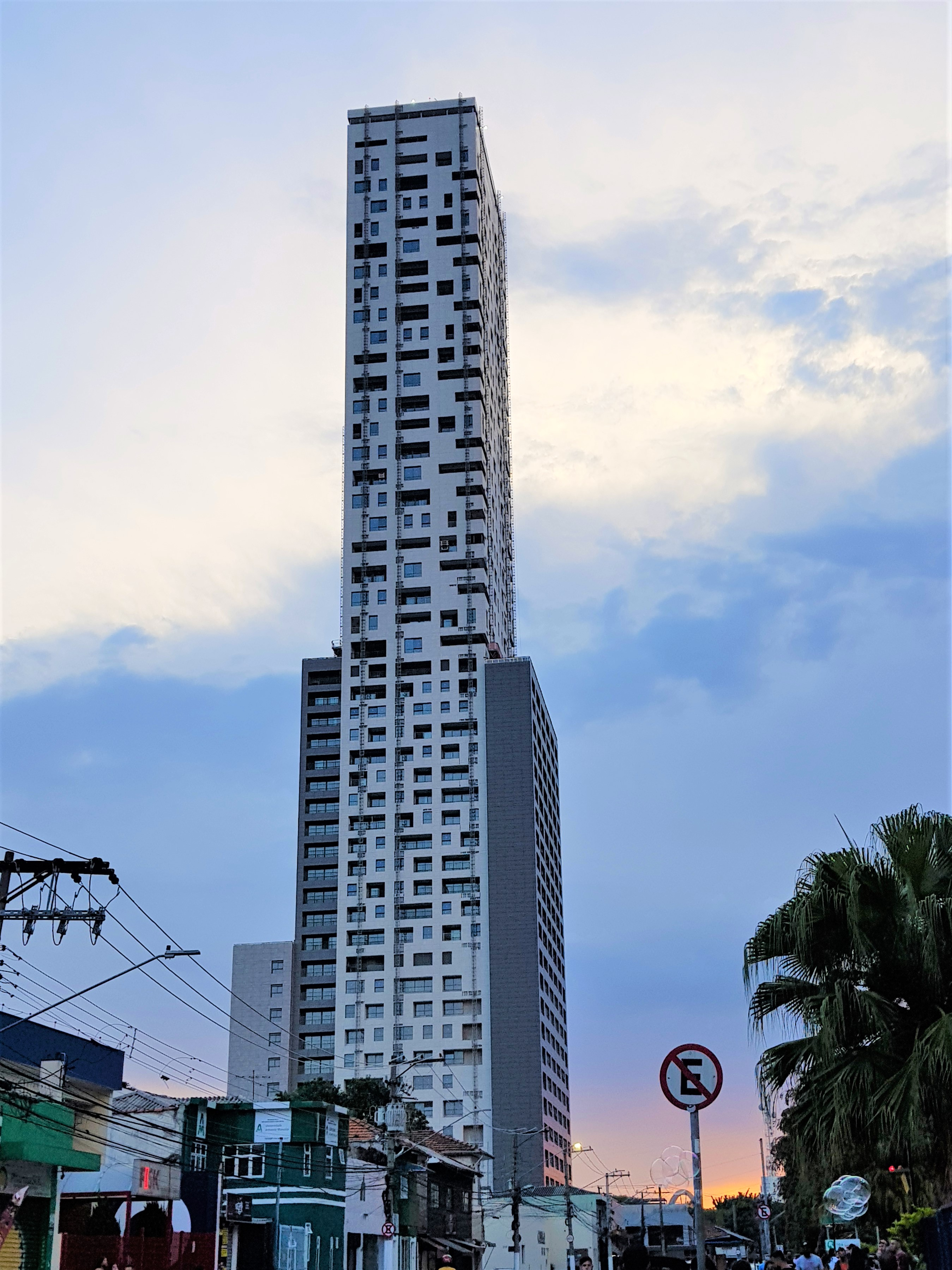
Platina 220 in 2022

Platina 220 is a mixed-use skyscraper located in the Tatuapé neighborhood, in the east zone of São Paulo, consisting of a hotel, residential apartments, commercial rooms and corporate buildings. Construction began in 2018, with the completion of its works and delivery in September 2022.

In March 2021, when its fiftieth top floor was completed at 172 meters high, the building became, at the time, the tallest in the city of São Paulo, two meters higher than the previous record holder, the Mirante do Vale building, which held the position for over fifty years. However, on May 31, 2025, it lost its position as the tallest building in the city to the corporate tower of the Alto das Nações complex.

About 2 kilometers away from the site, the Figueira Altos do Tatuapé building is also located, opened in 2021 and currently the largest residential building and fourth tallest building in the city of São Paulo. Still in the design phase, the Platina 220 won the international sustainability seal AQUA-HQE, from the Vanzolini Foundation.
