= E-Tower =

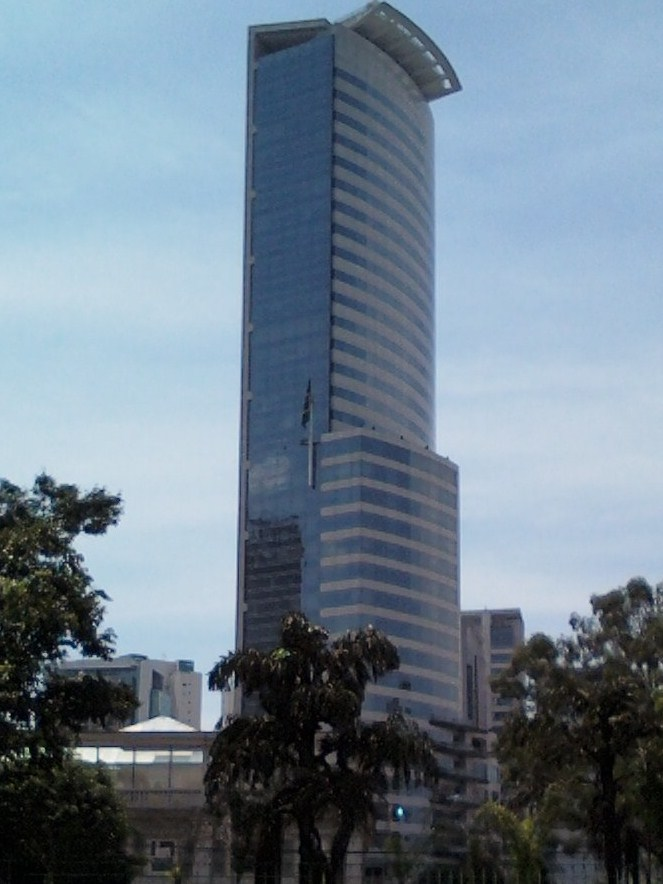

- Location within São Paulo Location within Brazil

General information
- Type: Office
- Location: São Paulo, Brazil
- Coordinates: 23°35′37″S 46°41′23″W
- Completed: 2005

Height
- Roof: 148 m (486 ft)

Technical details
- Floor count: 37
- Floor area: 51,225 m^{2} (551,381 sq ft)
- Lifts/elevators: 17

Design and construction
- Architects: Aflalo & Gasperini Arquitetos

E-Tower is a 37-storey skyscraper located in Vila Olímpia neighborhood, near Marginal Pinheiros, in the Brazilian city of São Paulo. At 148 metres, it is the 17th-tallest skyscraper in the city, with a postmodern architecture inspired by the Westend Tower in Frankfurt. Its original project was taller, but due to the intense traffic of helicopters in the region it had to be changed. It is the 4th most modern skyscraper in São Paulo.

== Concrete resistance ==
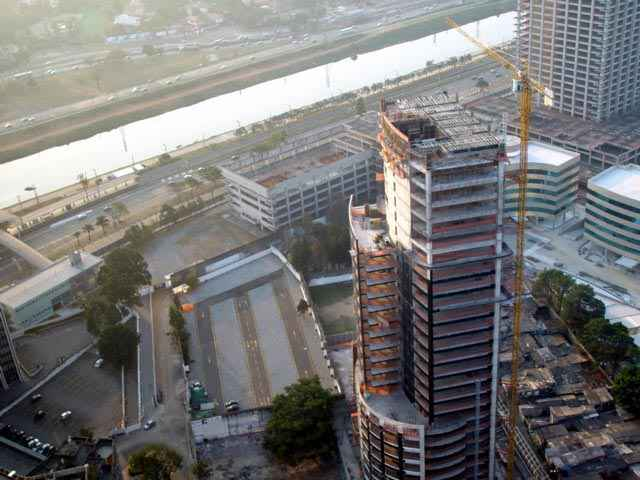
E-Tower being built in 2002.

E-Tower has the world record for concrete resistance, with a 10 metres floor-to-ceiling high lobby. The building was projected to the resistance concrete fck = 80 MPa, so that the four underground levels' pillars could have their dimensions reduced without losing their resistance capacity. The reduction of the pillars section allowed a higher number of parking spaces. The compression resistance achieved was considered a national record.

== Usage ==
It is composed of three different volumes. From 3rd to 7th floor, each floor has 1100 m^{2} of net area; from the 8th to the 19th floor, each floor has 850 m^{2} of net area; and from the 22nd to the 37th floor, each floor has 550 m^{2} of net area. Features of the building include a heated swimming pool in the 37th floor, an auditorium for 100 people on the ground level, a fitness centre on the 20th floor, a restaurant on the 21st floor, and a helipad on the roof.

== Gallery ==
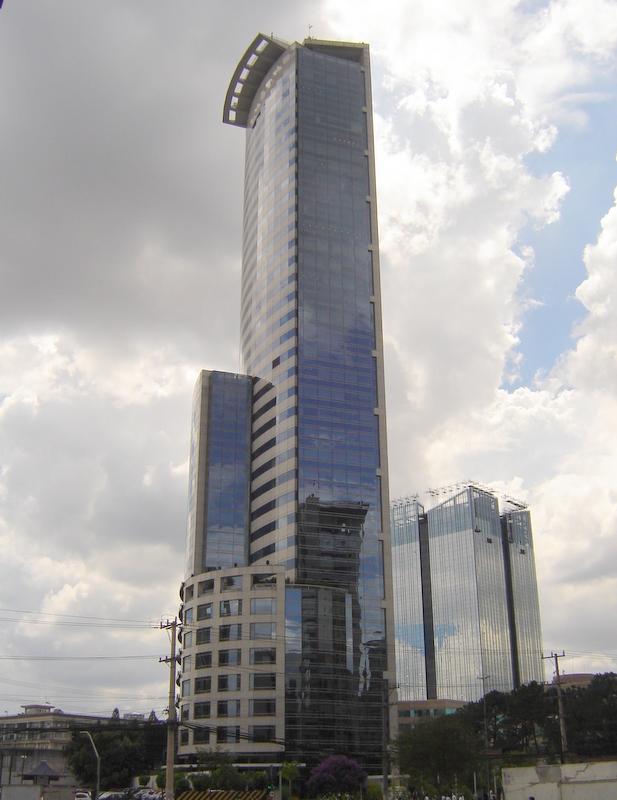

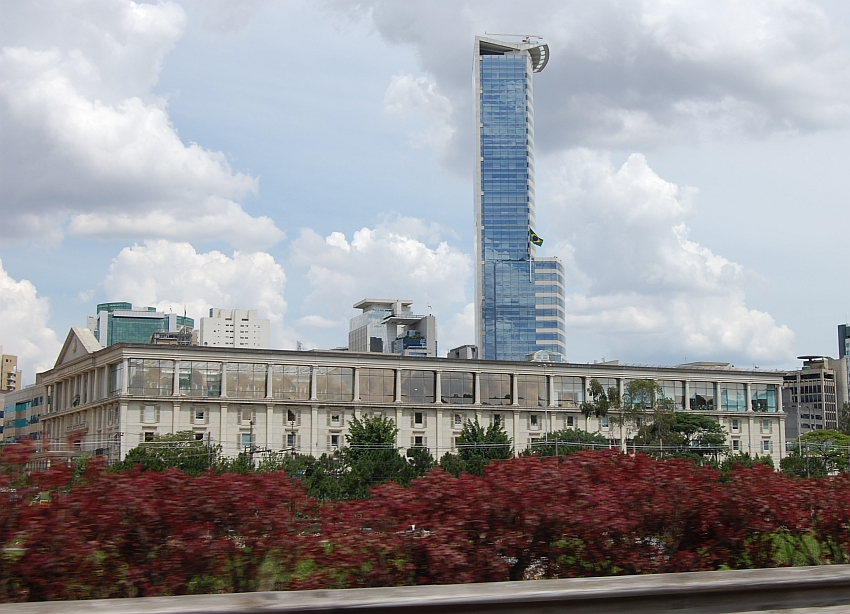
Daslu with E-Tower in the background

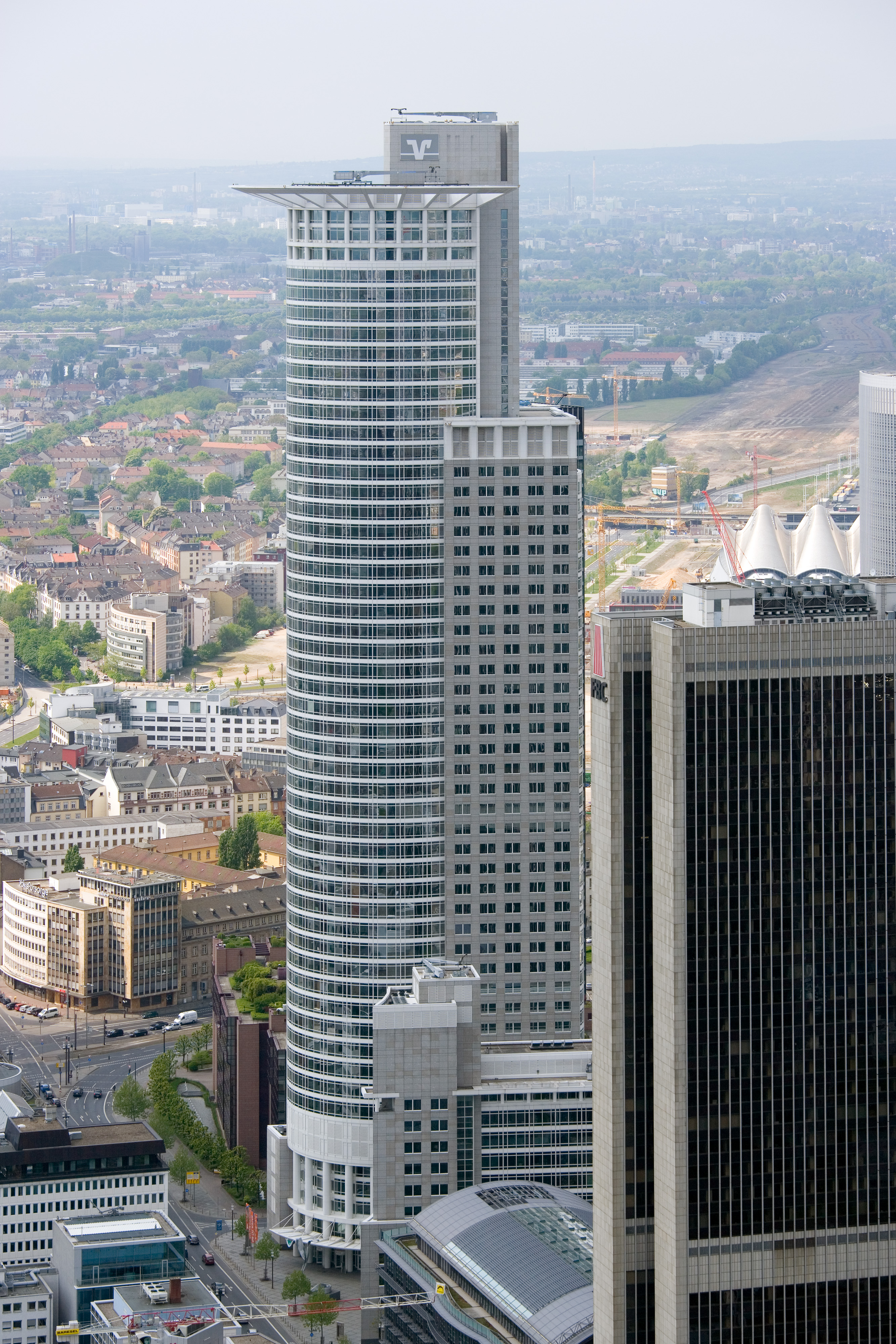
Westend Tower in Frankfurt, the building E-Tower was inspired in.

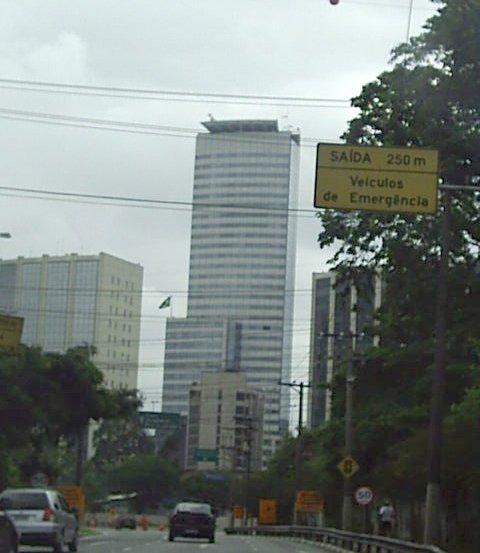

== See also ==
- List of tallest buildings in São Paulo
- List of tallest buildings in Brazil
- Postmodern architecture
