= São Paulo Corporate Towers =

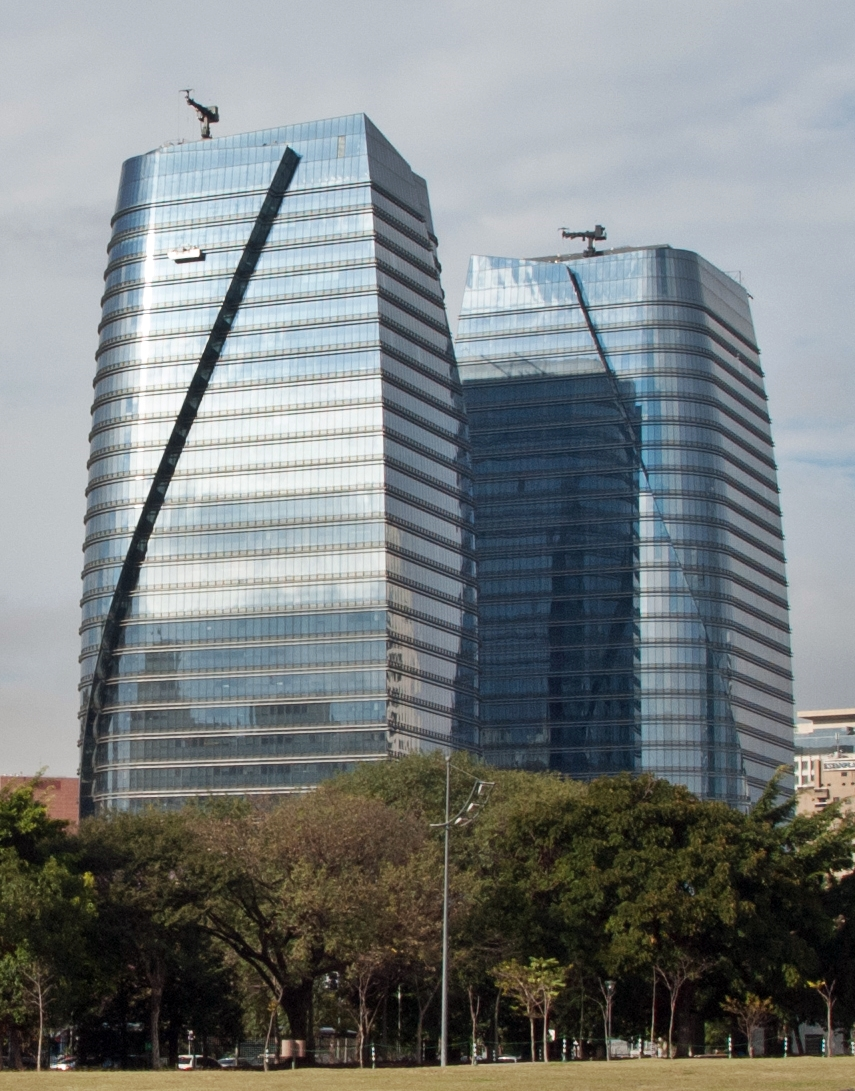
- São Paulo Corporate Towers in 2016
- Interactive map of the São Paulo Corporate Towers area

General information
- Location: São Paulo, Brazil
- Coordinates: 23.591639°S 46.687833°W

Design and construction
- Architecture firm: Pelli Clarke Pelli

São Paulo Corporate Towers is an office skyscraper complex in São Paulo, Brazil. Designed by architecture firm Pelli Clarke Pelli, the two towers comprising the complex rise to a height of 139 m.

== History ==
The construction work on the complex, designed by architecture firm Pelli Clarke Pelli, was completed in 2016.

== Description ==
The complex is located along Avenida Presidente Juscelino Kubitschek in the Vila Olímpia district, southwest of downtown São Paulo.

The complex consists of two twin 30-story office towers, each 139 meters tall. The two towers are connected by a one-story podium with a landscaped roof that blends into the surrounding landscape.

== See also ==
- List of tallest buildings in São Paulo
