= Figueira Altos do Tatuapé =

Skyscraper in Nova Lima, Brazil

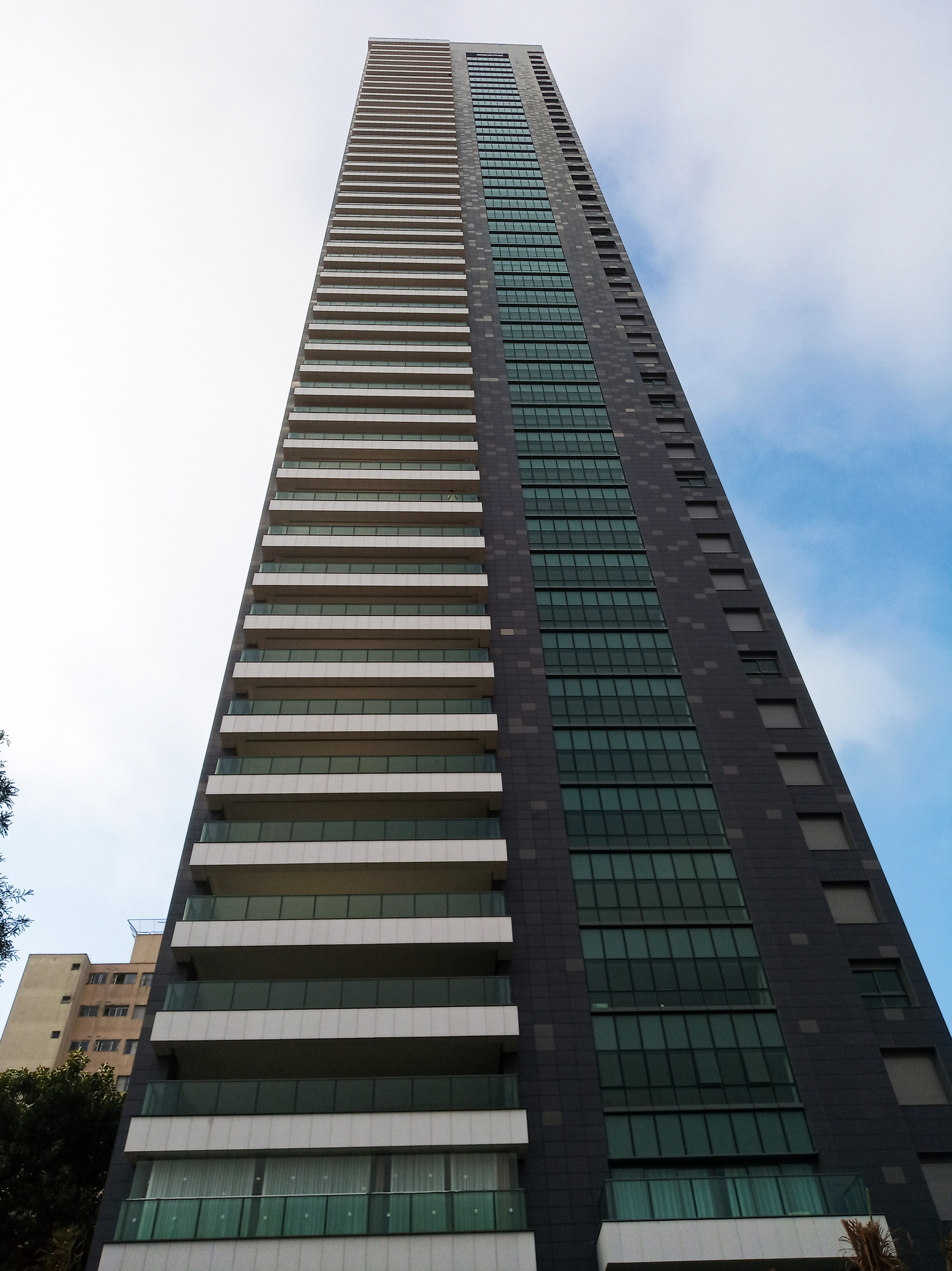
- Interactive map of the Figueira Altos do Tatuapé area

General information
- Status: Completed
- Type: Residential
- Location: Tatuapé, São Paulo, Brazil, R. Itapeti, 141 - Tatuapé, São Paulo - SP, 03324-002
- Coordinates: 23.55159°S 46.56978°W
- Construction started: 2017
- Completed: 2021

Height
- Roof: 168.2 m (552 ft)

Technical details
- Structural system: Concrete
- Floor count: 52 (+2 underground)
- Lifts/elevators: 3

Design and construction
- Architect: J.J. Abrao Arquiteto
- Developer: Porte Engenharia e Urbanismo
- Main contractor: Porte Engenharia e Urbanismo

Website
- Residencial Figueira Altos do Tatuapé

Figueira Altos do Tatuapé is a residential skyscraper in the Tatuapé district of the Eastern Zone of São Paulo, Brazil. Built between 2017 and 2021, the tower stands at 168.2 m (552 ft) tall with 52 floors and is the current 13th tallest building in Brazil.

== History ==
=== Architecture ===
Located on Rua Itapeti an avenue in the Tatuapé district of São Paulo, the tower's construction began in 2017 under the management of the Porte Engenharia e Urbanismo construction firm, and took about four years to complete. According to the company, the project was labeled as "self sustainable", and includes, among other facilities, the use of natural lighting, solar-powered water heating, an automated irrigation system connected to the rainwater harvesting system, and elevators with biometric identification that take 50 seconds to reach the top floor. The tower also provides a 270° view of the city's urban panorama through each of its habitable floors.

About 2.1 km from Figueira Altos, also in Tatuapé, the new tallest skyscraper in São Paulo was inaugurated, the Platina 220, measuring 172 meters high, which is a mixed-use building that brings together, in a single tower, hotel rooms, apartments, offices, stores and corporate slabs.

== See also ==
- List of tallest buildings in São Paulo
- List of tallest buildings in Brazil
- List of tallest buildings in South America
