= Alto das Nações =

Mixed-use complex in São Paulo, Brazil

Coordinates: 23°37′45″S 46°42′42″W

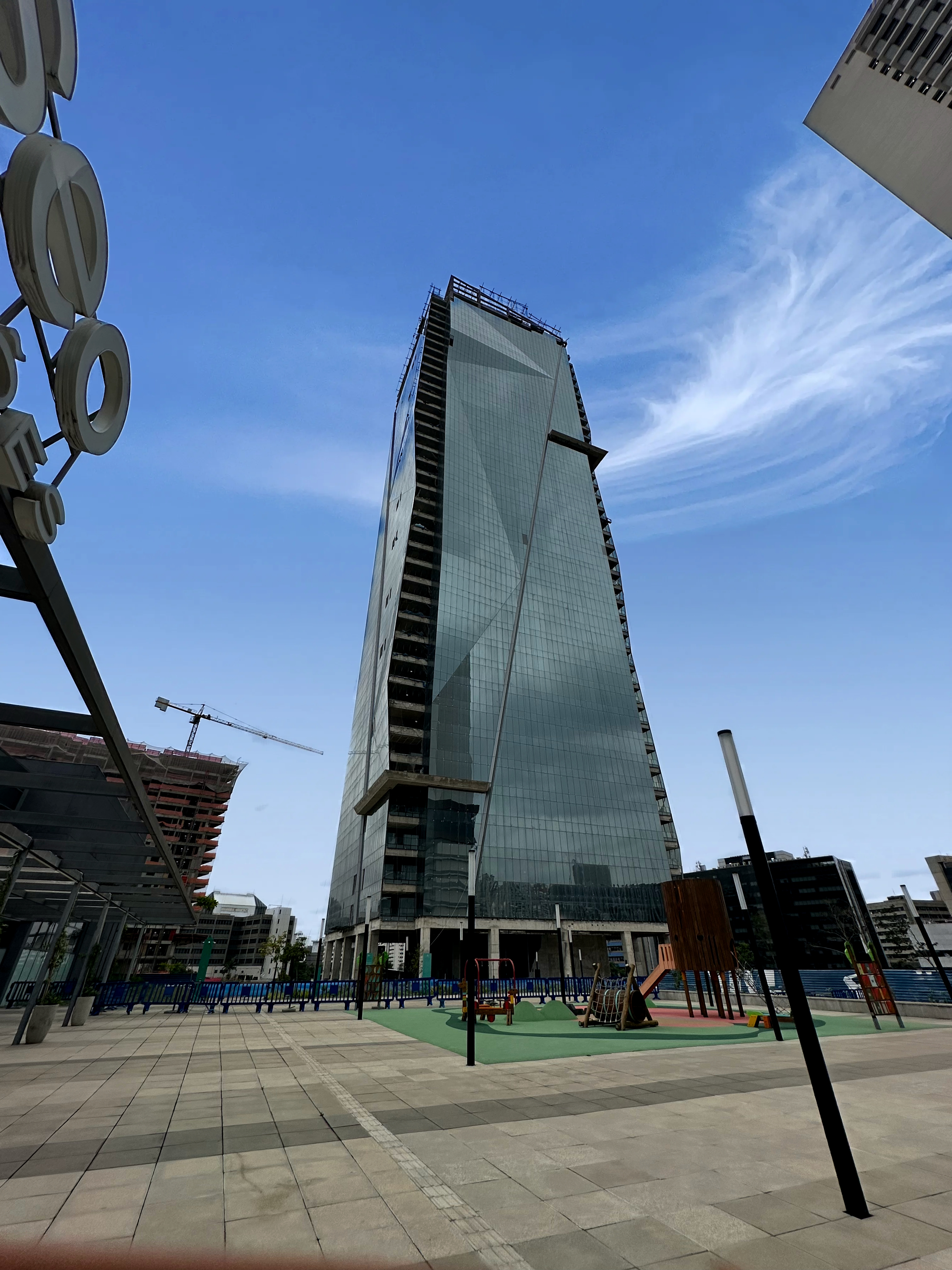
Alto das Nações under construction in 2025

Alto das Nações is a mixed-use real estate complex under construction located in the Granja Julieta neighborhood, in the South Zone of São Paulo. The project, with 320 thousand square meters of private area, houses a shopping center, a mixed-use tower and a Carrefour hypermarket, since the project is a partnership between Carrefour Property (from Grupo Carrefour Brasil) and WTorre, and will house residential and corporate towers, which will be the tallest corporate building in Brazil, at 219 meters high.

== History ==
With the aim of seeking sustainable solutions, it has, among other things, the use of natural light, large living areas and will house more than three hundred native trees in a shaded square. It is expected that around fourteen thousand people will circulate through it per day.

The project is divided into three stages, with the first phase having been delivered on December 1, 2022. It will reopen the first Carrefour store in Brazil, a shopping arcade, a mixed-use tower and the shopping center called Paseo Alto das Nações Mall — with a gross leasable area of 5,000 m^{2} and more than 40 stores, pharmacies, restaurants, a gym, a hair salon, a lottery shop, among others. The second phase of the project, scheduled for 2023, delivered a park and the interconnection of the complex with the Granja Julieta station. In the next stage, the corporate and residential towers will be inaugurated by 2026. The cost of the work is estimated at three billion reais.

On May 31, 2025, the corporate tower, still under construction, reached 175 meters in height (out of a total of 219 meters) and became the tallest building in the city of São Paulo.
