= Plaza Centenário =

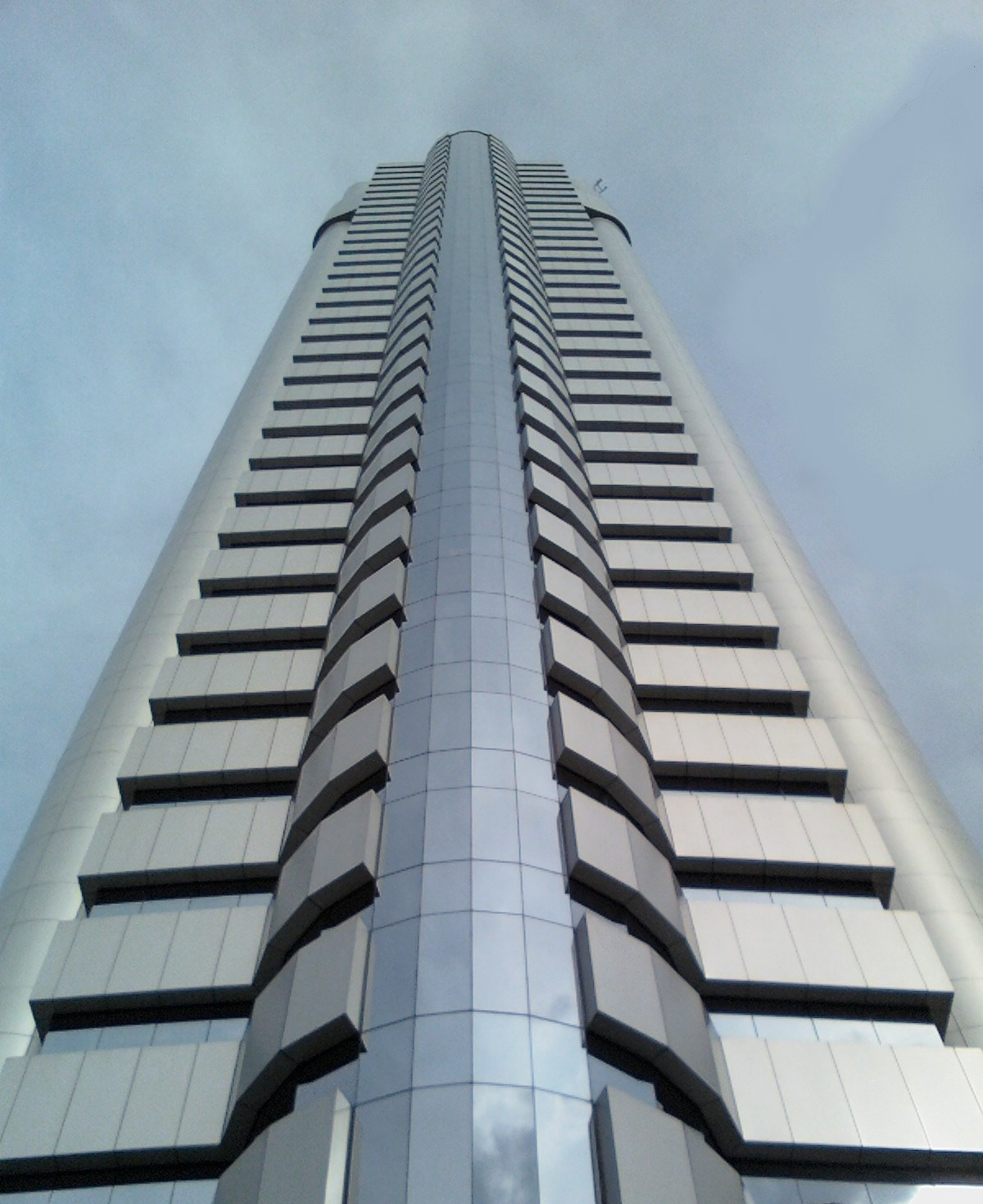
- Plaza Centenário is a modern skyscraper in São Paulo since 1995-2007.

- Location within São Paulo Location within Brazil

General information
- Type: Office
- Location: São Paulo, SP, Brazil
- Coordinates: 23.6057°S 46.6961°W
- Completed: 1995

Height
- Roof: 139 m (456 ft)
- Top floor: 32

Technical details
- Floor area: 77,500 m^{2} (834,000 ft^{2})

Plaza Centenário is a 32-story, 139-meter office tower on United Nations Avenue in São Paulo, Brazil, which also has several other upscale commercial buildings.

== Architecture ==
Plaza Centenário is a 139 m 456 ft office tower on Avenida das Nações Unidas in São Paulo, designed by Carlos Bratke and completed in 1996. The tower has 32 office floors per brokerage materials, though CTBUH counts 34 including mechanical levels. Its architect, Carlos Bratke, his work included among the 10 highest buildings in São Paulo, although, with the construction of new buildings, today he became the 12th highest in the city, and is also the 16th tallest building Brazil. It includes a rooftop helipad, a top floor auditorium, and on site retail such as a cybercafé. The exterior incorporates about 40,000 m² 430,556 sq ft of aluminum composite panels, and the total floor area is approximately 77,500 m² 834,200 sq ft. JLLCommercialPropertiesRevista PROJETO Construction lasted eight years.

== See also ==
- List of tallest buildings in South America
- Eldorado Business Tower
- Mirante do Vale
- Edifício Copan

Preceded by Edifício Copan	Modern Skyscraper in Brazil; 1995—2007	Succeeded by Eldorado Business Tower
