= Altino Arantes Building =

- Edifício Altino Arantes
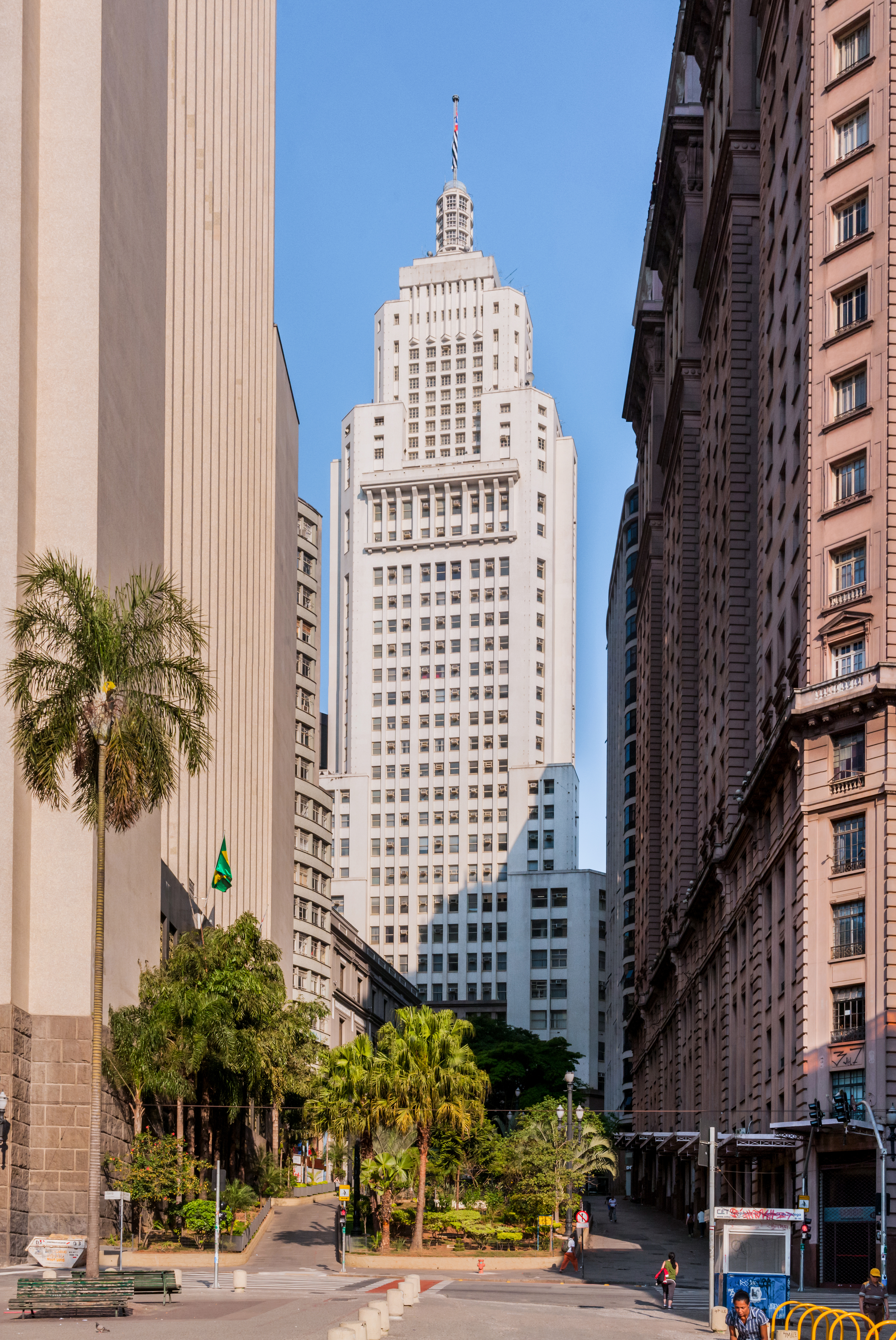

- Location within São Paulo Location within Brazil

Record height
- Tallest in South America from 1947 to 1960^{[I]}
- Preceded by: Kavanagh Building
- Surpassed by: Mirante do Vale

General information
- Type: Office
- Architectural style: Art Deco
- Location: São Paulo, Brazil
- Coordinates: 23°32′45″S 46°38′02″W
- Construction started: September 13, 1939
- Completed: June 27, 1947
- Inaugurated: June 27, 1947
- Owner: Santander Brasil

Height
- Tip: 161.22 m (528.94 ft)
- Roof: 161.22 m (528.94 ft)
- Top floor: 150 m (490 ft)

Technical details
- Floor count: 35
- Floor area: 17,951 m^{2} (193,220 sq ft)
- Lifts/elevators: 14

Design and construction
- Architect: Plinio Botelho do Amaral
- Structural engineer: Plinio Botelho do Amaral
- Main contractor: Camargo & Mesquita

Other information
- Public transit: São Bento

The Altino Arantes Building (Portuguese: Edifício Altino Arantes), also known as the Banespa Building (in Portuguese: Edifício do Banespa) and most popularly by Banespão (big Banespa), is an important Art Deco skyscraper located in São Paulo, Brazil.

== History ==
The building was the headquarters of the Bank of the State of São Paulo (Banespa), and was constructed between 1939 and 1947. It remained the tallest building of the city for two decades until being surpassed by the Mirante do Vale. Soon after its completion in the 1940s, it was named the world's largest structure of reinforced concrete. It was designed by Plínio Botelho do Amaral, who was inspired by the Empire State Building and Frank Lloyd Wright. Its panoramic view of the center of São Paulo and its outskirts attract thousands of visitors.

After its foundation in 1909, the Banespa underwent a period of substantial expansion and needed a larger headquarters. The first place chosen for such purpose was in Ramos de Azevedo Square, a place distant from the São Paulo's banking district near São Bento and XV de Novembro streets. Determined to move to an area of more economic prominence, the bank made an agreement with the Santa Casa de Misericórdia to purchase a building that they would demolish to construct a new headquarters on João Brícola street. The project was held in the account of the engineer and architect Plinio Botelho do Amaral, but was adapted by the contracting firm Camargo & Mesquita, who wanted to construct something similar to the Empire State Building.

Construction began on 19 September 1939. After almost 8 years, the building was inaugurated on 27 June 1947, as São Paulo's tallest, being 161.22 meters in height. It remained São Paulo's tallest skyscraper for nearly 20 years. In the time of inauguration it was also tallest skyscraper outside United States. During much time the building was easily identifiable due to the luminous signboard that shone from its roof. In the following year a French magazine called it the biggest structure of reinforced concrete in the world, as many big buildings (including the Empire State Building, which at the time was the world's tallest) were constructed with metal. In the decade of the 1960s the building's name was changed to "Edifício Altino Arantes", an homage to the first Brazilian president of the bank, Altino Arantes Marques. Since then, the building has not undergone any significant external alterations, even after the 2000 sale of Banespa to the Spanish financial group Banco Santander Central Hispano.

In 2011, Condephaat listed the building as a municipal heritage site.

The building was closed for public visitation in 2015 and underwent an internal renovation, reopening on 26 January 2018, as a cultural and entertainment center named Farol Santander.

== Statistics ==
The building has 35 floors, is 161.22 meters tall and 17,951 square meters in area, and has 14 elevators, 900 steps and 1,119 windows. For 20 years, it was the tallest building in São Paulo. In 1948, it was considered to be the biggest reinforced concrete structure in the world.

== Hall ==
The entrance hall is 379 square meters in area. Its chandelier employs national crystal in the "déco-eclectic" style. It has granite blocks on the floor, small tiles with very small drawings of the Brazilian territory, encircled by the words "Banco do Estado do São Paulo" (Bank of the State of São Paulo).

== View ==
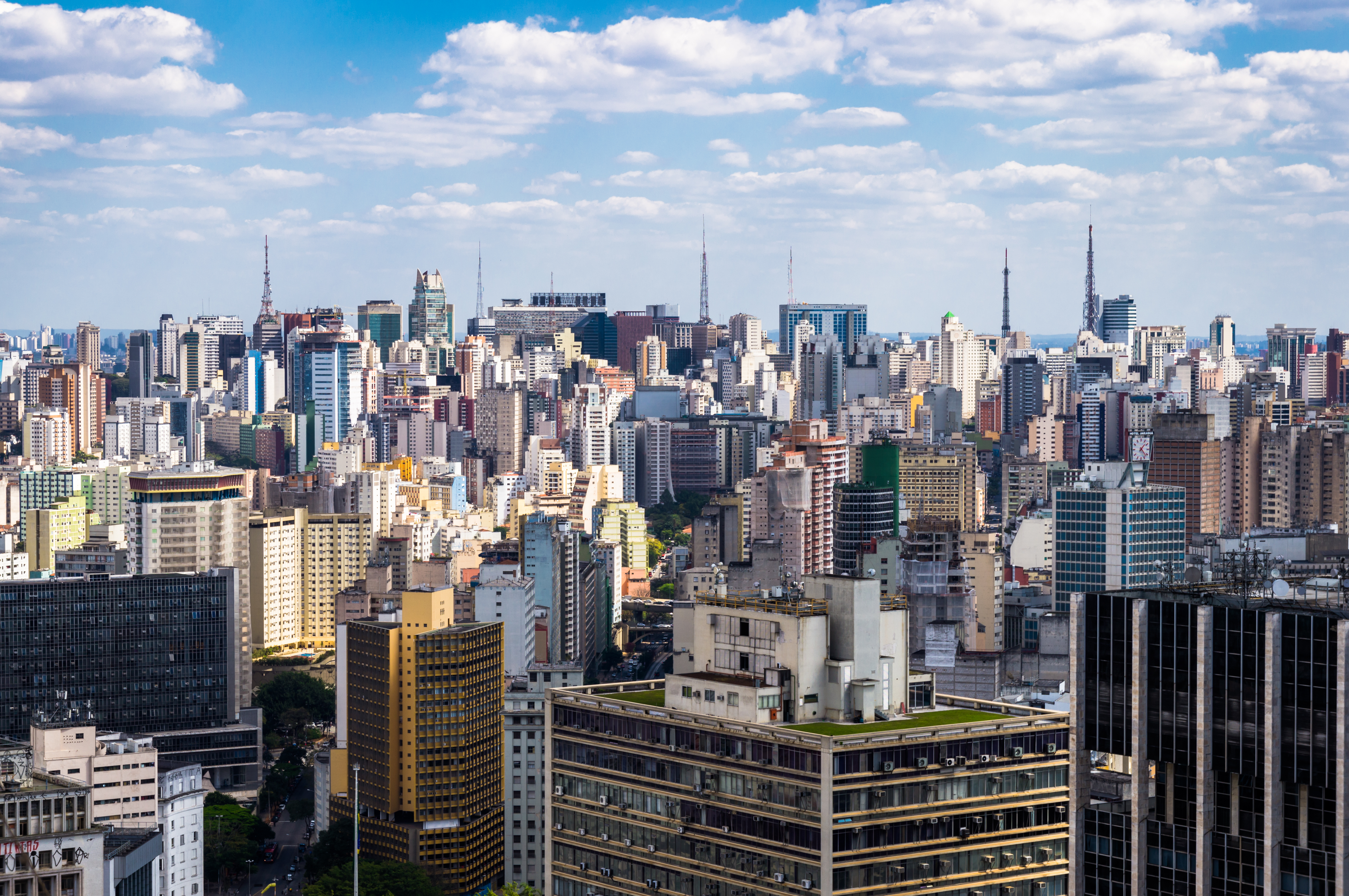
View from the observation deck.

The Banespa Tower is one of the best-known skyscrapers of São Paulo. In the highest point of the building, accessible from 33rd floor by 2 sets of stairs, there is an observation deck with views of up to 40 km. One can see there other important landmarks of the city, such as the Municipal Market, the Sé Cathedral, the Edifício Italia which took its place as the city's highest building, and beyond into diverse neighboring quarters. From the top one may see:

- São Paulo Cathedral
- Pátio do Colégio
- Viaduto Santa Ifigênia
- Vale do Anhangabaú
- Edifício Itália
- Viaduto do Chá
- Paulista Avenue
- Mosteiro de São Bento
- Martinelli Building
- Municipal Market

To get a tour, identification card is needed: a copy of the passport for foreigners. The Parapet is small; visitors are only allowed 5 minutes at the top.

== Museum ==
The building also houses the Banespa Museum, which chronicles the almost 100-year history of the bank since its inauguration as Bank of Hipothecário Credit of the State of São Paulo until now. The museum's collection includes 993 objects, 1003 workmanships, 98 signed photographs, 66 eastern and national carpets among other items.

Records
Preceded by Martinelli Building	Tallest building in South America; 161.22 m (528.94 ft); 1947–1960	Succeeded by Mirante do Vale
Preceded by Martinelli Building	Tallest building in Brazil; 161.22 m (528.94 ft); 1947–1960	Succeeded by Mirante do Vale
Preceded by Martinelli Building	Tallest building in São Paulo; 161.22 m (528.94 ft); 1947–1960	Succeeded by Mirante do Vale
