= Mirante do Vale =

Skyscraper in São Paulo, Brazil

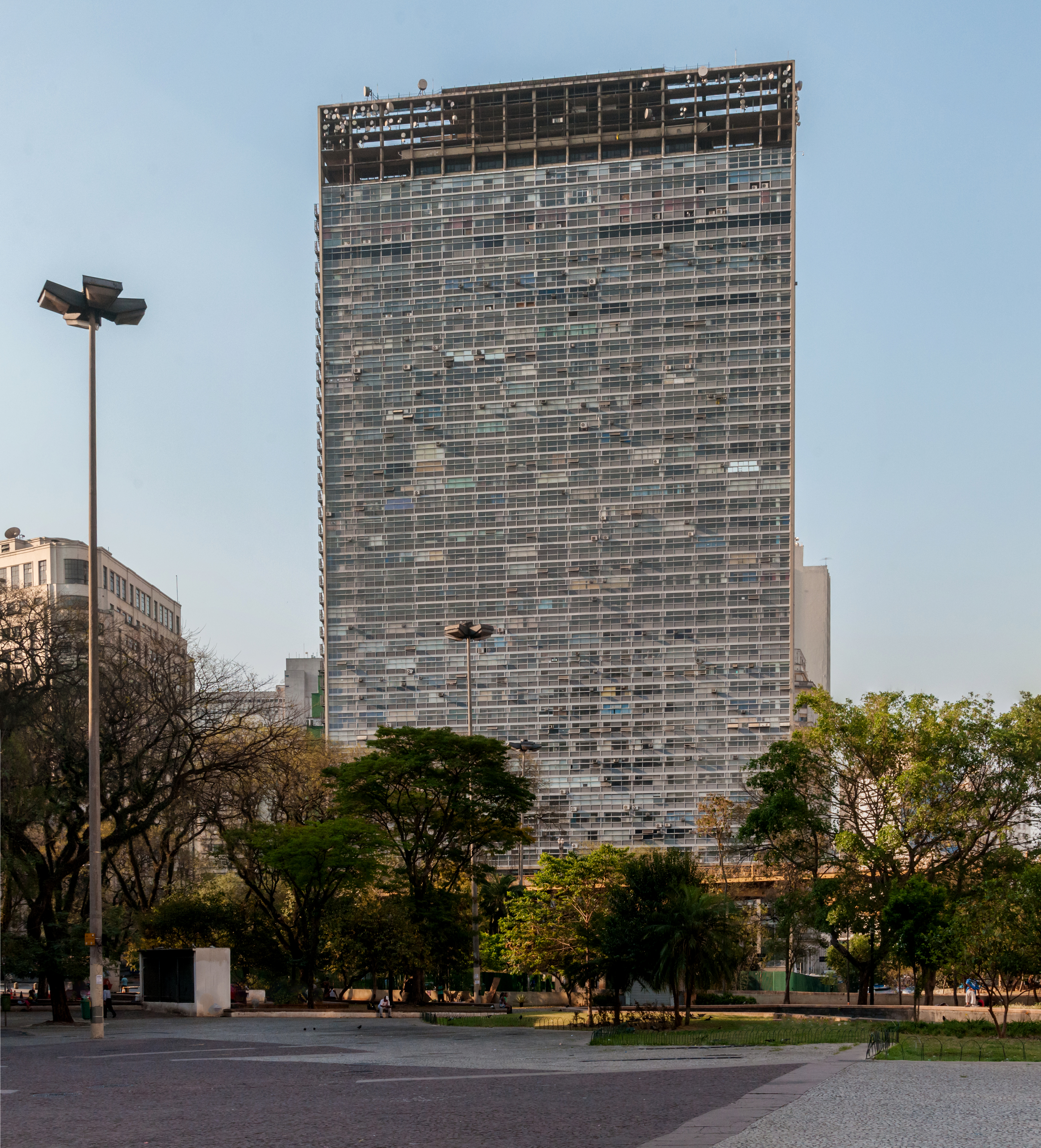
- Mirante do Vale

- Location within São Paulo Location within Brazil

Record height
- Tallest in South America from 1960 to 1972^{[I]}
- Preceded by: Altino Arantes Building
- Surpassed by: Coltejer Building

General information
- Type: office, residential, parking garage and retail
- Location: São Paulo, Brazil, Avenida Prestes Maia, 241
- Coordinates: 23°32′31.97″S 46°38′07.26″W
- Construction started: 1959 or 1960
- Completed: 1967

Height
- Roof: 170 m (558 ft)

Technical details
- Floor count: 51
- Floor area: 75,000 m^{2} (810,000 sq ft)
- Lifts/elevators: 12

Design and construction
- Architects: Waldomiro Zarzur, Aron Kogan

Mirante do Vale (Portuguese: Condomínio Mirante do Vale, loosely translated as Overlook of the Valley Condominium), also called Palácio W. Zarzur or Palácio Zarzur Kogan in honour of its architects, is a 170 m (558 ft) mixed-use skyscraper located in São Paulo, Brazil, in the area of Downtown São Paulo and Vale do Anhangabaú. Constructed from 1959 to 1966, it was the tallest building in São Paulo for 54 years until 2022 when it was surpassed by Platina 220. Mirante do Vale was also the tallest in Brazil until 2014 when it was surpassed by Millennium Palace in Balneário Camboriú, Santa Catarina.

== Construction ==
The building architects were structural engineers Waldomiro Zarzur (1922–2013) and Aron Kogan (1924–1961), Brazilian engineers, who graduated from the School of Engineering at Mackenzie Presbyterian University. Aron Kogan was murdered during construction, in 1961.

== History ==
Designed by engineer Waldomiro Zarzur with Aron Kogan, the Mirante do Vale is located in the region of Vale do Anhangabaú, having access via three entrances, one on Prestes Maia Avenue, another on Pedro Lessa Square, and another on Brigadeiro Tobias Street. The construction of the skyscraper took six years. Waldomiro was an engineer with considerable experience. His first work, a house at Afonso Brás Street, Vila Nova Conceição, was performed when he was just 21 and still studying engineering at Mackenzie. At that time, the friendship with fellow student Aron Kogan became a society, which lasted until 1960, when Kogan was murdered during the robbery his car. Waldomiro took over the enterprise.

It's possible to have an aerial view of Vale do Anhangabaú by visiting the observatory of the Altino Arantes Building or of the Edifício Itália, places that seemed to be higher. It can also be seen from Viaduto do Chá and Viaduto Santa Efigênia, the latter well in front of the building. During certain periods, the concrete and steel lattice structure at top of the building supported large neon signs advertising various brands, such as Fanta and Sharp, among others. Those signs were since long removed, due recent laws of "Cidade Limpa".

The building was known as the Palácio Zarzur Kogan (Zarzur Kogan Palace) until 1988. Being located in a valley, Mirante do Vale sits on a lower part of the city compared to the other two and is, therefore, perceived as being lower than other buildings in the city, such as the Edifício Itália or the Altino Arantes Building. Another factor that contributes to the relative lack of knowledge of people towards the building is that it was closed for public visitation, although access to the top can be granted by permission.

== Observation ==
On top of Mirante do Vale, it is possible to observe the entire region of Downtown São Paulo and part of the Paulista Avenue, including buildings Itália and Altino Arantes.

A bird's eye view of Mirante do Vale is possible from the observation decks of either the Altino Arantes Building or the Edifício Itália.

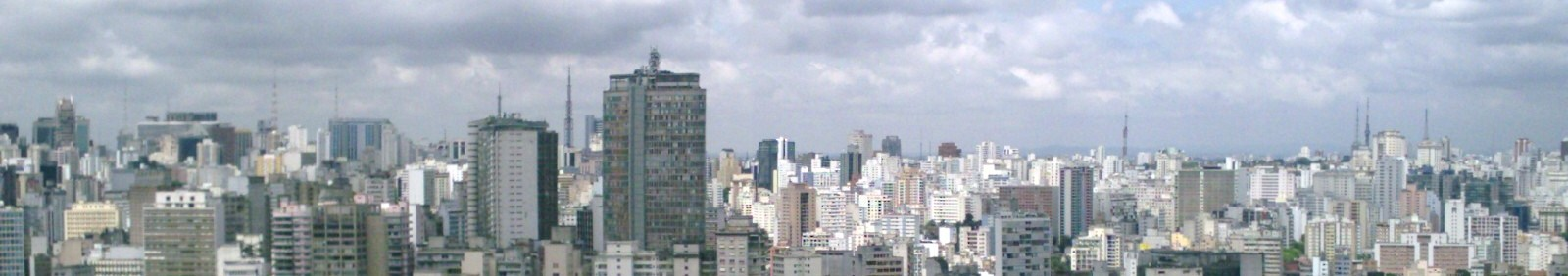
View over Downtown São Paulo, and Edifício Itália, in the top of Mirante do Vale

== See also ==
- List of tallest buildings in South America
- List of tallest buildings in Brazil
- List of tallest buildings in São Paulo

== Sources ==
Records
Preceded by Altino Arantes Building	Tallest building in the Southern Hemisphere; 170 m (558 ft); 1960–1972	Succeeded by Carlton Centre
Preceded by Altino Arantes Building	Tallest building in South America; 170 m (558 ft); 1960–1972	Succeeded by Coltejer Building
Preceded by Altino Arantes Building	Tallest building in Brazil; 170 m (558 ft); 1960–2014	Succeeded by Millennium Palace
Preceded by Altino Arantes Building	Tallest building in São Paulo; 170 m (558 ft); 1960–2022	Succeeded by Platina 220
