= List of tallest buildings in Rio de Janeiro =

Skyline of Rio de Janeiro Skyline de Rio de Janeiro
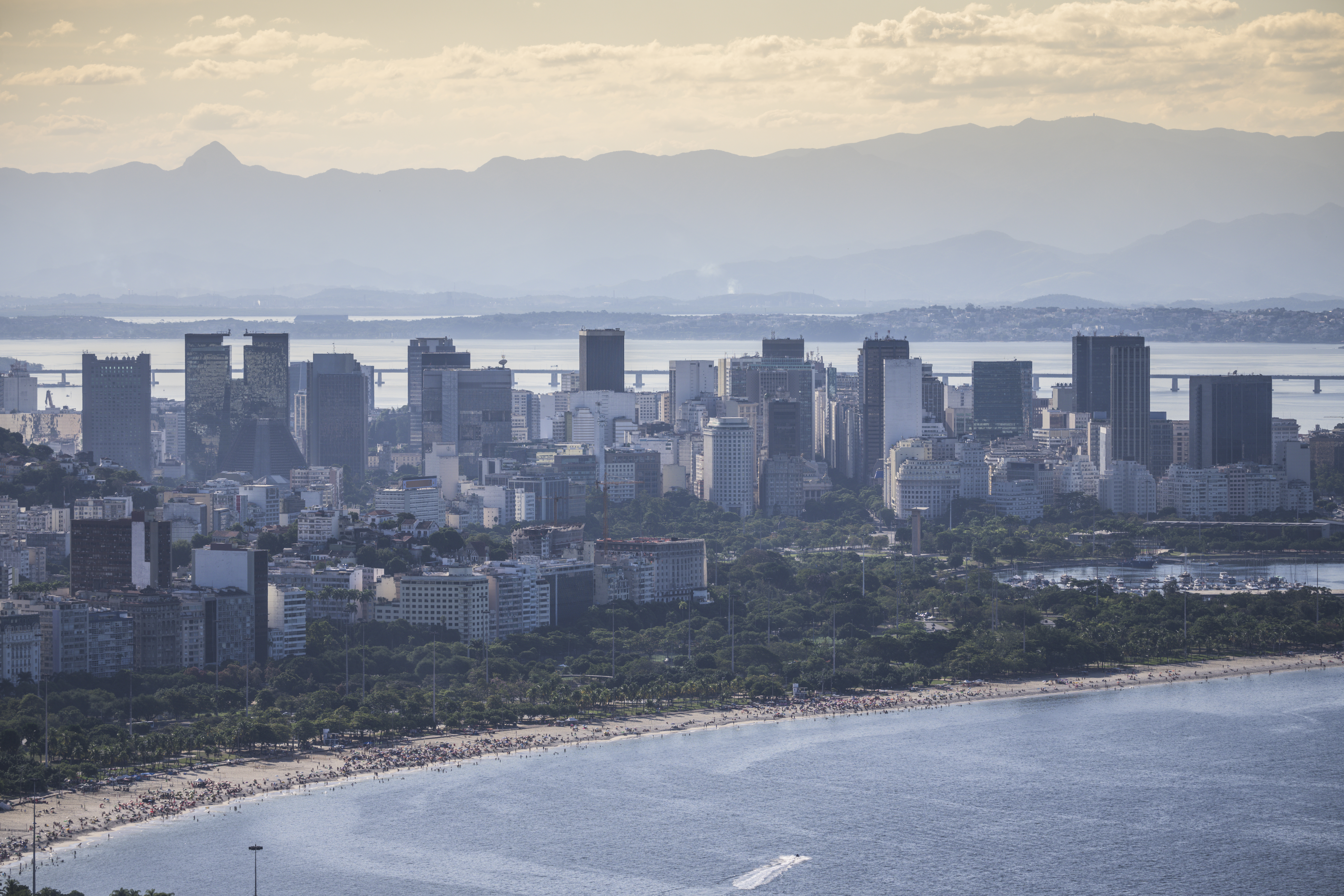
- Centro in 2024
- Tallest building: Rio Sul Center (1982)
- Tallest building height: 163.1 m (535 ft)
- First 150 m+ building: Rio Sul Center (1982)

Number of tall buildings (2026)
- Taller than 100 m (328 ft): 36
- Taller than 150 m (492 ft): 2

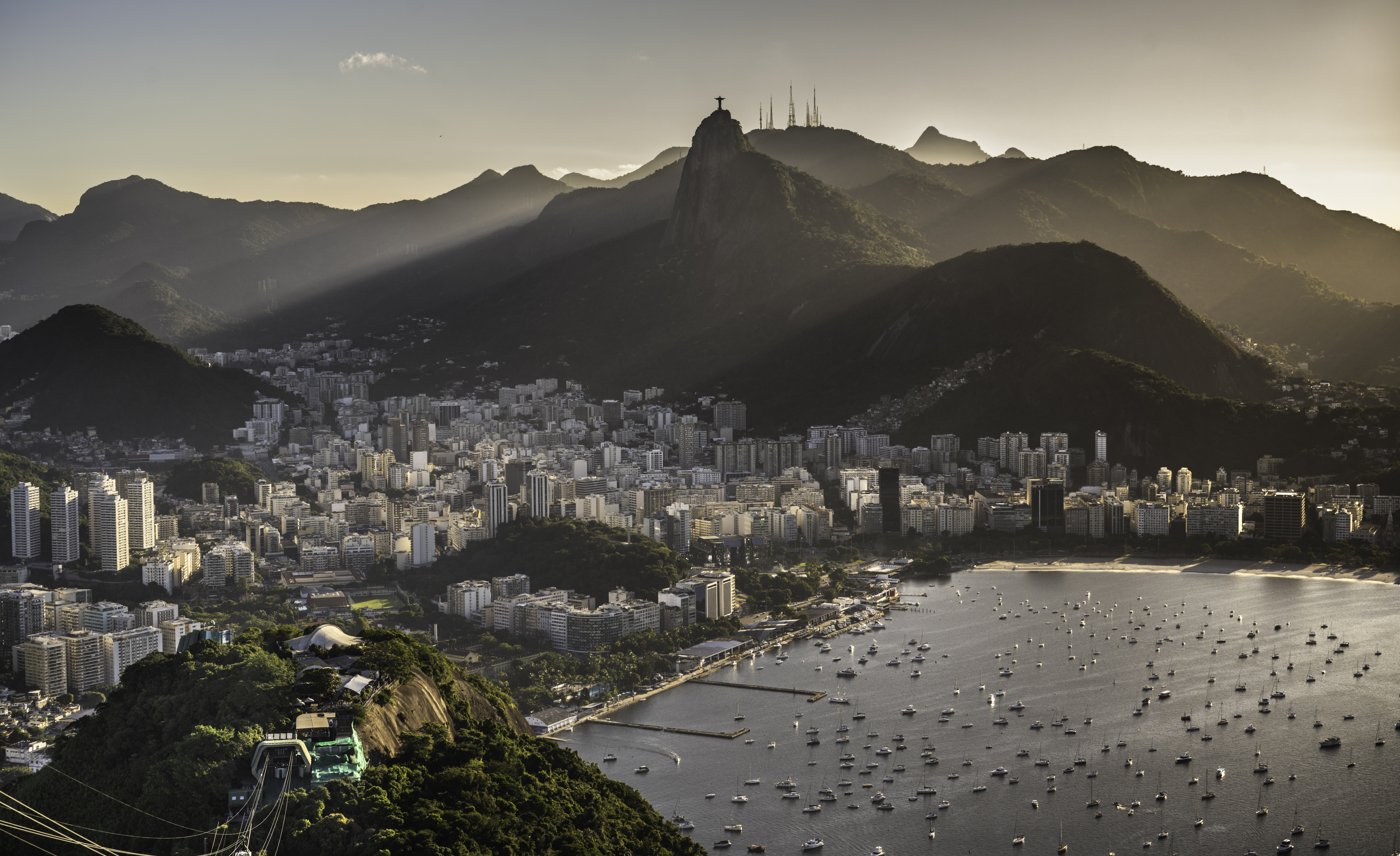
High-rises nestled among hills, with Corcovado in the background

Rio de Janeiro is the capital and largest city of the state of the same name, and the second largest city in Brazil, with an estimated population of 6,729,894 as of 2024. Its metropolitan area is also the second largest in Brazil and the third largest in South America, with a population of 12,022,050. Rio de Janeiro has a relatively short skyline for a city of its size; nevertheless, it is the largest skyline in its state. As of 2026, Rio de Janeiro has 36 buildings over 100 meters (328 ft). The tallest building in Rio de Janeiro is the Rio Sul Center, an 48-story office skyscraper with a height of 163 m (535 ft) and completed in 1982. It is one of two skyscrapers taller than 150 m (492) ft, the other being the Ventura Corporate Towers.

As Brazil's most populated city in the early 20th century, the city had some of Brazil's earliest high-rises, such as the Art Deco Joseph Gire Building in 1929, and the Estrada de Ferro Central do Brasil, with a habitable clock tower, in 1945. The majority of high-rises above 100 m (328 ft) in the city were built between the 1960s and 1980s; since then, relatively few tall buildings have been completed. Only 5 high-rises that reach a height of 100 m (328 ft) have been built since 1990. The tallest of these are the Ventura Corporate Towers, completed in 2010.

Most of the tallest buildings of Rio de Janeiro are concentrated in the central business district of Centro. However, the city's tallest, Rio Sul Center, is located in Botafogo, in the south of the city. Shorter high-rises can be found in various neighborhoods throughout the rest of the city, including along the coast of the famed Copacabana Beach. In addition to its high-rises, Rio de Janeiro's skyline is also famed for its natural backdrop, particularly the peaks of Sugarloaf Mountain and Corcovado, above which sits the statute of Christ the Redeemer.

== History ==
=== 1920s–1950s ===
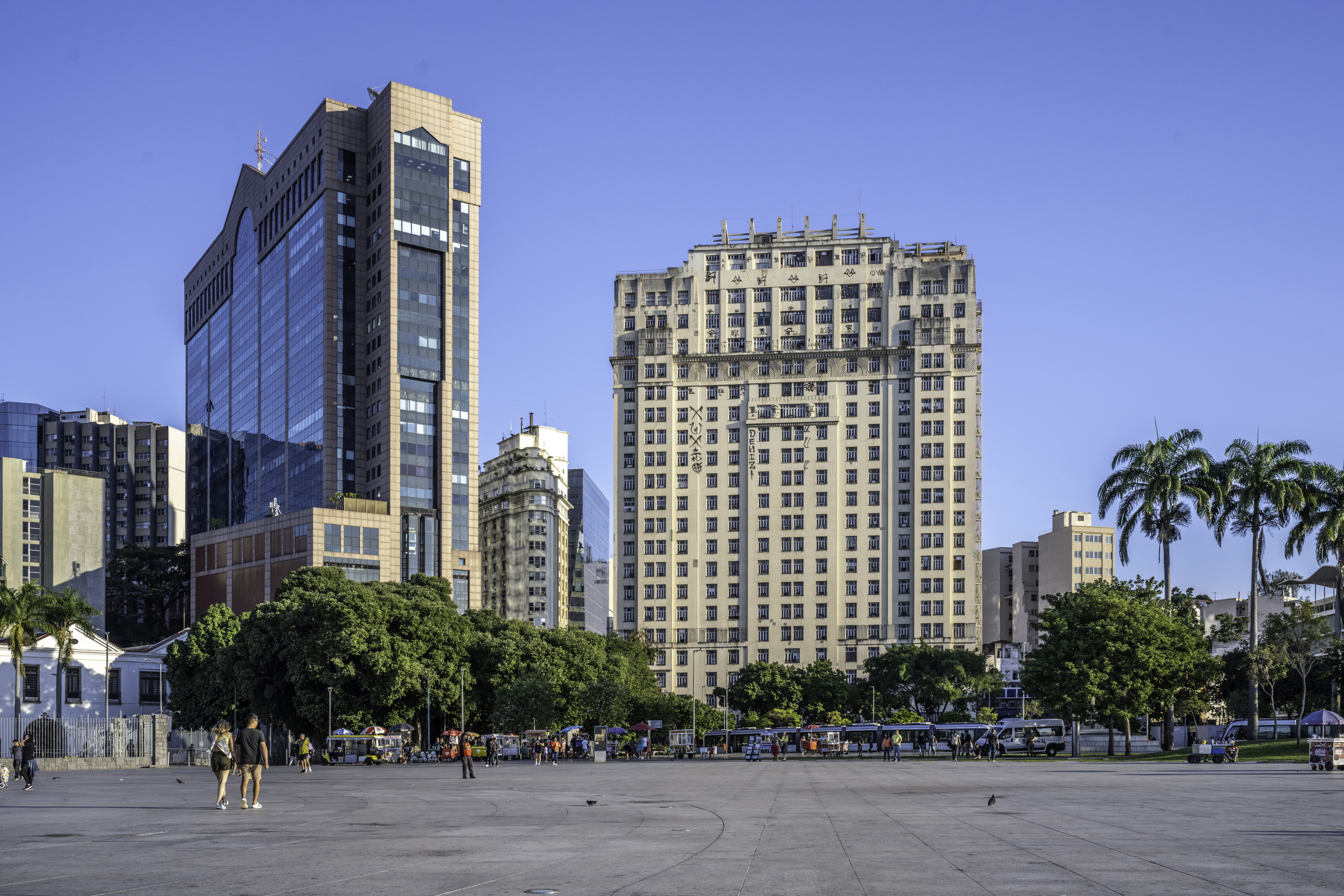
Praça Mauá, with the Joseph Gire Building on the right

Rio de Janeiro was the capital and most populous city of Brazil during the early 20th century. The city, and the central neighbourhood of Centro, is home to some of Brazil's first high-rises, the most notable of which was the Joseph Gire Building, completed in 1927 on the Praça Mauá. It was the first building in the city to reach a height of 100 m (328 ft). It was the tallest building in all of Brazil and Latin America until it was surpassed by the Martinelli Building in São Paulo in 1929. An office building, it initially served as the headquarters of the newspaper A Noite. From 1937 onwards, it was also home to the Rádio Nacional.

The Joseph Gire Building remained the tallest building in Rio de Janeiro until 1945, when a high-rise building located at the then newly rebuilt Central do Brasil train station was completed. The Art Deco office tower served as the seat of the Estrada de Ferro Central do Brasil. The building was part of major improvement works undertaken by the new authoritarian regime in Brazil, the Estado Novo, which included the construction of new buildings for public institutions and the widening and opening of streets.

=== 1960s–1980s ===
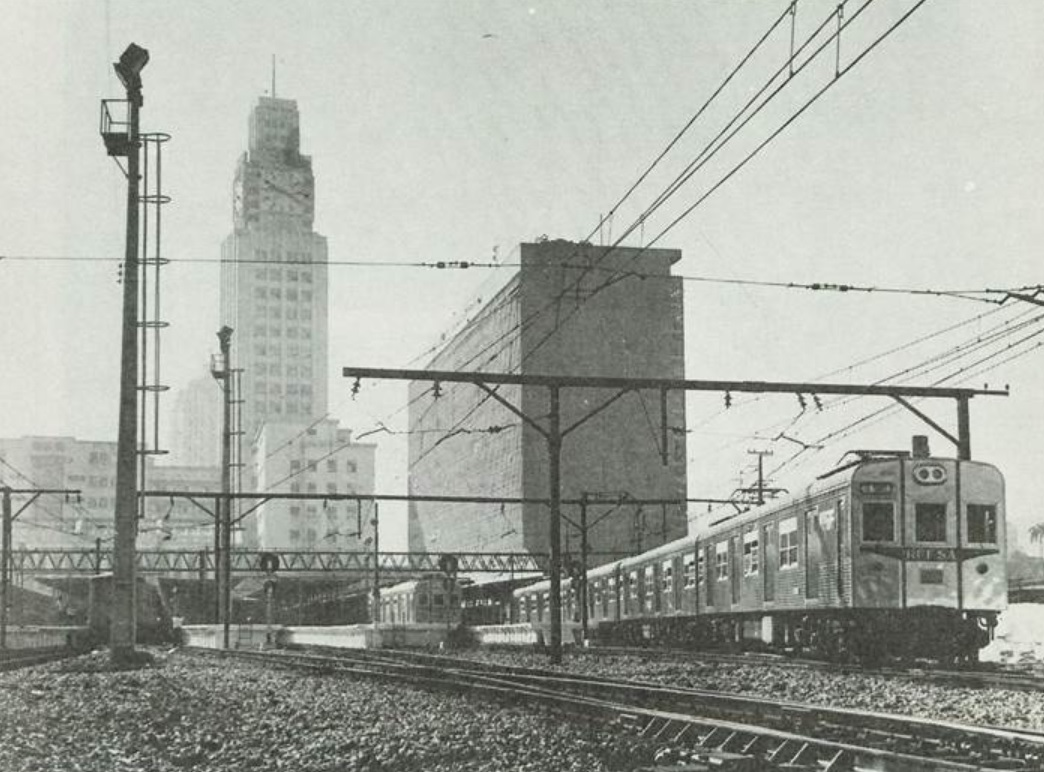
The Central do Brasil building (left) in 1979

In the 1960s, many high-rise office buildings started to be built in Centro, such as the headquarters of the Banco do Estado do Rio de Janeiro (Bank of the State of Rio de Janeiro) and Sede BNH. More office buildings were built during the 1970s and 1980s. Development also spread to the beachfront Botafogo neighbourhood, with Morada do Sol residential complex, consisting of seven buildings above 100 m, completed there in 1967. Nearby, the Rio Sul Center became the tallest building in the city in 1982, and remains the tallest today. The brutalist-style skyscraper is part of a commercial complex that contains a shopping mall.

A few more buildings above 100 m were also built further afield. The Windsor Atlantica hotel, built in 1976, is situated on Rio's famous Copacabana beach. Now renamed the Hilton Copacabana Hotel, it remains the tallest building in Copacabana today. The upper-middle class neighbourhood of Barra da Tijuca has two notable cylindrical buildings, Torre Ernest Hemingway and Torre Charles Degaulle, built in 1977 and 1990, respectively. Originally conceived in the 1960s as part of an ambitious project of 76 cylindrical buildings by Oscar Niemeyer, only those two buildings were ever completed. A third unfinished building, Torre H, will eventually be completed after 2025.

=== 1990s–present ===
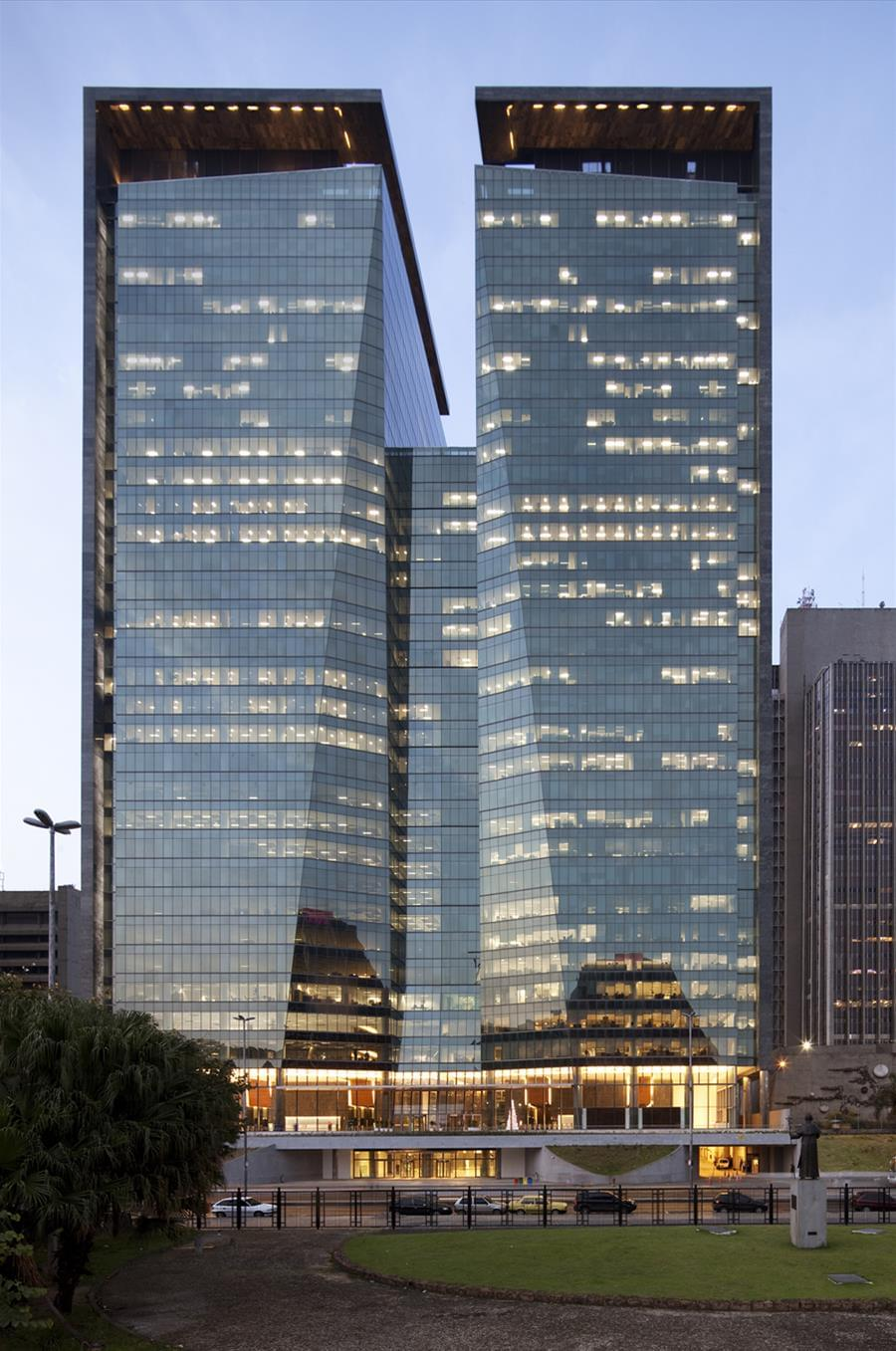
The Ventura Corporate Towers

Since the 1990s, few high-rises above 100 m have been built in Rio de Janeiro. The only office building built in Centro above that height in the 1990s was the Manhattan Tower. The 2000s also saw only one new building above 100 m, Torre Almirante. It was built on the site of the former Andorinha Building, which was destroyed by a fire in 1986. The new high-rise incorporates the facade of the destroyed building. The Ventura Corporate Towers were completed in 2010, becoming the city's second tallest building. Designed by Kohn Pedersen Fox associates, the building among the most significant high-rise projects completed in Rio de Janeiro in the 21st century.

Currently, the tallest building completed during the 2020s is Residential Skylux by Tegra. Notably, it is the first residential high-rise above 100 m in Centro, a predominantly commercial area. The high-rise is part of a potential trend to encourage greater residential density in Rio's central areas. On the side of the building is a 75-meter tall mural painted by local artist Bruno Big with 780 liters of paint.

== Cityscape ==
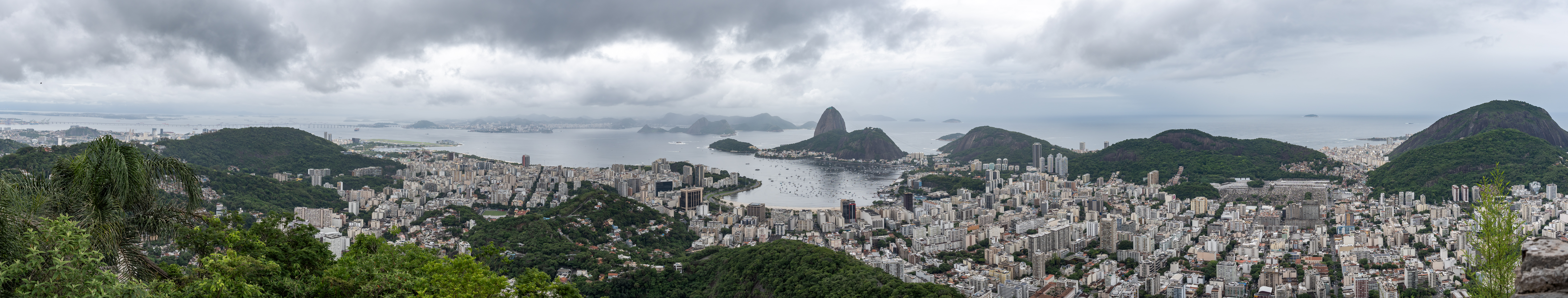
A panoramic view of Rio de Janeiro in 2024

== Map of tallest buildings ==
=== Centro ===
This map shows the location of buildings in Centro in Rio de Janeiro that are taller than 100 m (328 ft). Buildings located outside of Centro are not shown. Each marker is numbered by the building's height rank, and colored by the decade of its completion.

Buildings taller than 100 m (328 ft) in Rio de Janeiro. An asterisk (*) next to the name of the building indicates it is located outside the map.
- 1950s and before
- 1960s
- 1970s
- 1980s
- 1990s
- 2000s
- 2010s
- 2020s
1 Rio Sul Center*
2 Ventura Corporate Towers
3 Sedan Building
4 Conde Pereira Carneiro Building
5 Santos Dumont Building
6 Cândido Mendes Center
7 Edificio Lineu de Paula Machado
8 Avenida Central Building
9 Sede do Banerj
10 Sede BNH
11 Seculo Frontin
12 Banco Centro do Brasil
13 Edificio Bokel
14 BNDES Building
15 Morada do Sol VII*
16 Morada do Sol VI*
17 Torre Ernest Hemingway*
18 Torre Charles de Gaulle*
19 Estrada de Ferro Central do Brasil
20 Treze de Maio 33
21 Edifício Rodolpho De Paoli
22 Torre Almirante
23 Morada do Sol II*
24 Hilton Rio de Janeiro Copacabana*
25 Edifício Sede do Citibank
26 Morada do Sol V*
27 Morada do Sol III*
28 Palácio Austregésilo de Athayde
29 Manhattan Tower
30 Hotel Nacional*
31 Morada do Sol IV
32 Morada do Sol I*
33 Edifício Sede da Petrobras
34 Residencial Skylux by Tegra
35 Joseph Gire Building
36 Vista Guanabara

== Tallest buildings ==
This lists ranks completed buildings in Rio de Janeiro that stand at least 100 m (328 ft) tall as of 2026, based on standard height measurement. This includes spires and architectural details but does not include antenna masts. The “Year” column indicates the year of completion. Buildings tied in height are sorted by year of completion with earlier buildings ranked first, and then alphabetically.

Was the tallest building in Rio de Janeiro upon completion

Rank	Name	Image	Location	Height m (ft)	Floors	Year	Purpose	Notes
1	Rio Sul Center		22°57′27″S 43°10′34″W	163.1 (535)	48	1982	Office	Tallest building in Rio de Janeiro and in Botafogo since 1982. Tallest building completed in Rio de Janeiro in the 1980s
2	Ventura Corporate Towers		22°54′33″S 43°10′54″W	151.4 (497)	34	2010	Office	Tallest building in Centro. Tallest building completed in Rio de Janeiro in the 2010s
3	Sedan Building		22°54′35″S 43°10′41″W	145.5 (477)	40	1980	Office	Tallest building in Rio de Janeiro from 1980 to 1982.
4	Conde Pereira Carneiro Building	–	22°54′15″S 43°10′41″W	145 (476)	43	1976	Office	Tallest building in Rio de Janeiro from 1976 to 1980. Tallest building completed in Rio de Janeiro in the 1970s.
5	Santos Dumont Building		22°54′38″S 43°10′24″W	140.8 (462)	45	1975	Office	Tallest building in Rio de Janeiro from 1975 to 1976.
6	Cândido Mendes Center		22°54′15″S 43°10′31″W	140 (459)	43	1982	Office	
7	Edificio Lineu de Paula Machado	–	22°54′30″S 43°10′34″W	138 (453)	34	1980	Office	
8	Edificio Avenida Central		22°54′25″S 43°10′39″W	136 (446)	34	1961	Office	Tallest building in Rio de Janeiro from 1961 to 1975. Tallest building completed in Rio de Janeiro in the 1960s.
9	Sede do Banerj	–	22°54′24″S 43°10′35″W	136 (446)	34	1965	Office	
10	Sede BNH		22°54′31″S 43°10′52″W	135 (443)	30	1968	Office	
11	Seculo Frontin	–	22°54′26″S 43°10′35″W	131.1 (430)	40	1983	Office	
12	Banco Centro do Brasil	–	22°54′07″S 43°10′58″W	130 (427)	25	1984	Office	
13	Edifício Bokel	–	22°54′40″S 43°10′31″W	130 (427)	37	1970	Office	
14	BNDES Building		22°54′31″S 43°10′48″W	128.9 (423)	29	1982	Office	
15	Morada do Sol VII	–	22°57′24″S 43°10′42″W	124 (407)	38	1967	Residential	Join-tallest residential building in Rio de Janeiro.
16	Morada do Sol VI	–	22°57′26″S 43°10′42″W	124 (407)	38	1967	Residential	Joint-tallest residential building in Rio de Janeiro.
17	Torre Ernest Hemingway	–	23°00′37″S 43°19′46″W	122.2 (401)	36	1990	Residential	Tallest building completed in Rio de Janeiro in the 1990s.
18	Torre Charles de Gaulle	–	23°00′10″S 43°19′41″W	122.2 (401)	36	1977	Residential	
19	Estrada de Ferro Central do Brasil		22°54′14″S 43°11′28″W	122 (400)	28	1945	Office	Tallest building in Rio de Janeiro from 1945 to 1961. Tallest building completed in Rio de Janeiro in the 1940s.
20	Treze de Maio 33	–	22°54′33″S 43°10′39″W	121.6 (399)	40	1983	Residential	
21	Edifício Rodolpho De Paoli	–	22°54′22″S 43°10′40″W	120.3 (395)	36	1970	Office	
22	Torre Almirante		22°54′26″S 43°10′30″W	120 (394)	36	2004	Office	Tallest building completed in Rio de Janeiro in the 2000s.
23	Morada do Sol II	–	22°57′24″S 43°10′46″W	119.5 (392)	36	1967	Residential	
24	Hilton Rio de Janeiro Copacabana		22°57′52″S 43°10′24″W	119.2 (391)	38	1976	Hotel	Formerly known as the Windsor Atlantica Hotel. Tallest hotel building in Rio de Janeiro.
25	Edifício Sede do Citibank	–	22°54′21″S 43°10′41″W	118 (387)	30	1983	Office	
26	Morada do Sol V	–	22°57′23″S 43°10′43″W	116.4 (382)	36	1967	Residential	
27	Morada do Sol III	–	22°57′24″S 43°10′45″W	115.6 (379)	36	1967	Residential	
28	Palácio Austregésilo de Athayde	–	22°54′37″S 43°10′22″W	115.2 (378)	30	1979	Office	
29	Manhattan Tower	–	22°54′08″S 43°10′42″W	114 (374)	33	1992	Office	
30	Hotel Nacional		22°59′52″S 43°15′26″W	113.7 (373)	34	1972	Hotel	Also known as Hotel Horsa Nacional.
31	Morada do Sol IV	–	22°57′23″S 43°10′47″W	113.3 (372)	34	1967	Residential	
32	Morada do Sol I	–	22°57′24″S 43°10′46″W	111.6 (366)	34	1967	Residential	
33	Edifício Sede da Petrobras	–	22°54′35″S 43°10′46″W	110 (361)	24	1974	Office	Also known as Edificio Edise.
34	Residencial Skylux by Tegra	–	22°53′58″S 43°10′45″W	109 (358) (Note: This height is an estimate by The Skyscraper Center.)	32	2024	Residential	
35	Joseph Gire Building		22°53′50″S 43°10′52″W	102 (335)	22	1929	Office	Tallest building in Rio de Janeiro from 1929 to 1945. Tallest building completed in Rio de Janeiro in the 1920s.
36	Vista Guanabara	–	22°53′43″S 43°11′13″W	101 (331) (Note: This height is an estimate by The Skyscraper Center.)	23	2016	Office	

== Tallest under construction or proposed ==
=== Under construction ===
As of 2026, Rio de Janeiro has no buildings under construction that are expected to reach a height of 100 m (328 ft).

== Timeline of tallest buildings ==
Name	Image	Years as tallest	Height (m)	Floors
Joseph Gire Building		1929–1945	102	22
Estrada de Ferro Central do Brasil		1945–1961	122	28
Edificio Avenida Central		1961–1975	136	34
Santos Dumont Building		1975–1986	140.8	45
Edificio Conde Pereira Carneiro	–	1976–1980	145	43
Sedan Building		1980–1982	145.5	40
Rio Sul Center		1982–present	163.1	48

== See also ==
- List of tallest buildings in Brazil
- List of tallest buildings in Balneário Camboriu
- List of tallest buildings in São Paulo
