= Rolim Building =

- Edifício Rolim
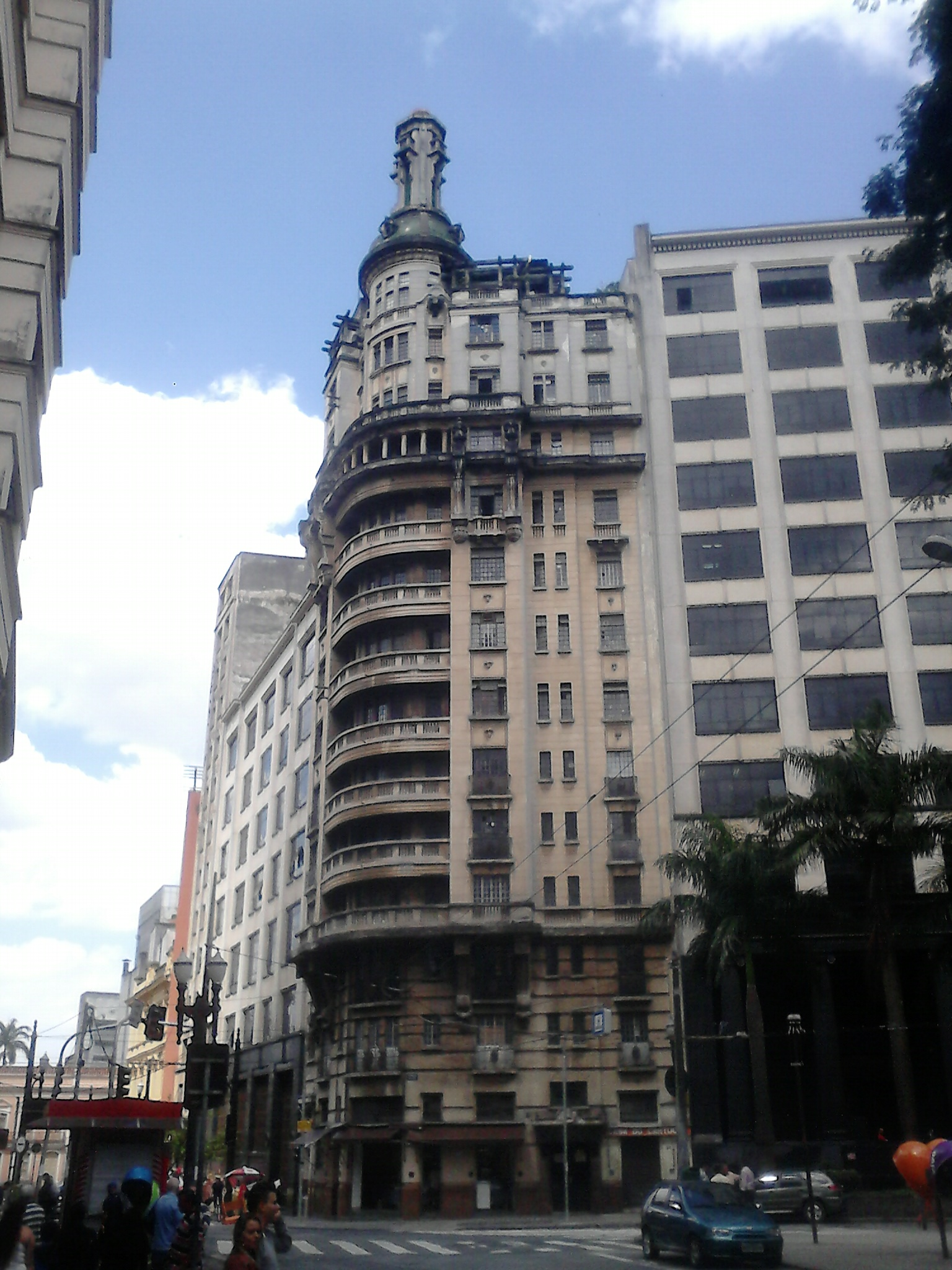
- The Rolim Building in 2013
- Click on the map for a fullscreen view

General information
- Location: São Paulo, Brazil
- Coordinates: 23°32′56.1″S 46°37′58.59″W

The Rolim Building (Portuguese: Edifício Rolim) is a historic building located in São Paulo, Brazil.

== History ==
The building, designed by architect Hipólito Gustavo Pujol Junior, was constructed in 1928 on the site of the former Church of Saint Peter, which had been demolished as part of the redevelopment and enlargement of Praça da Sé. At the time of its completion, it was the tallest building in São Paulo, a title it retained until it was surpassed by the Martinelli Building in 1929.

== Description ==
The building is on a corner lot in centre of São Paulo. Designed in an eclectic style influenced by Catalan Modernism, it has 13 storeys and is crowned by a bronze dome topped with a small beacon.

== Gallery ==
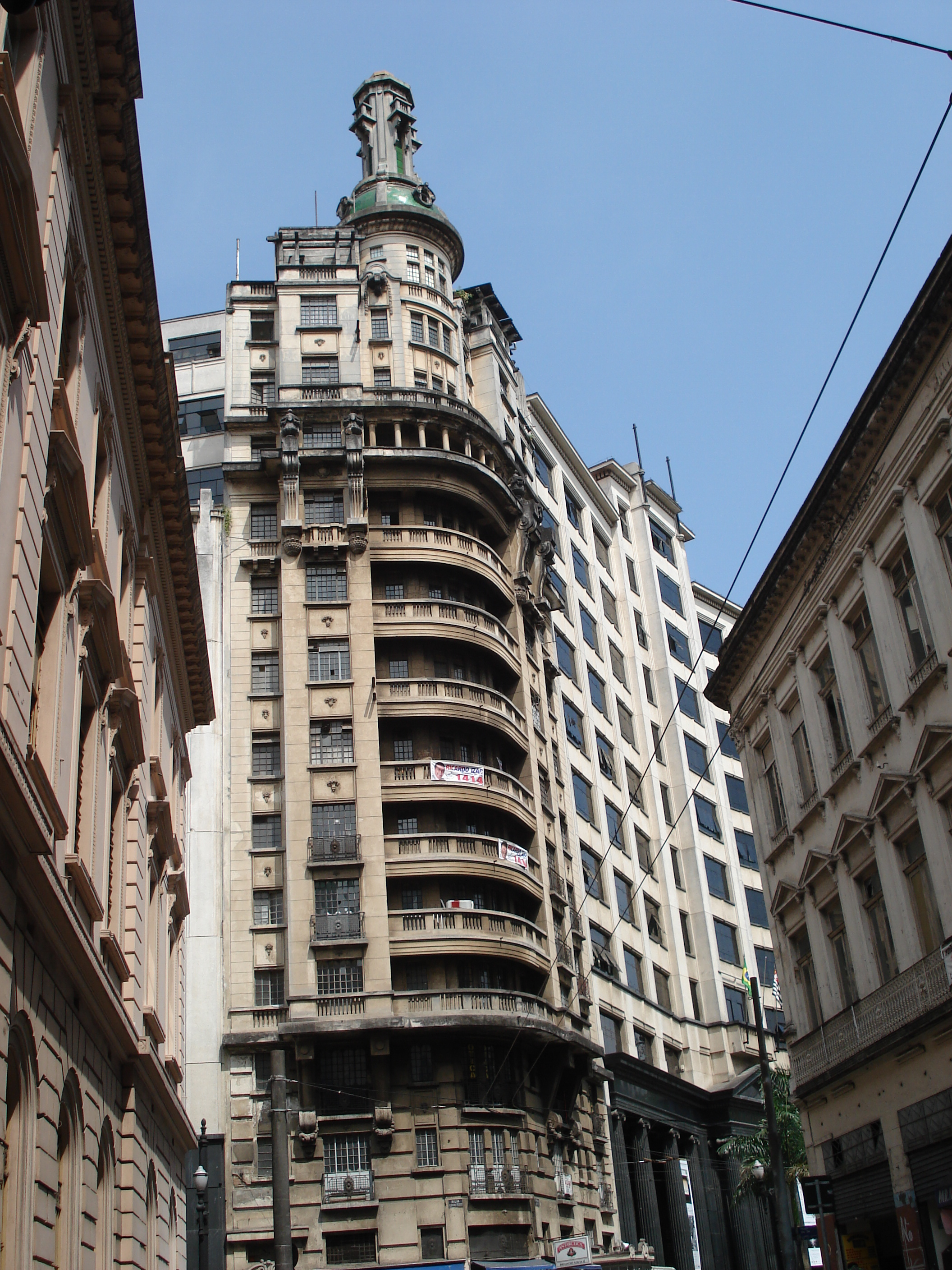

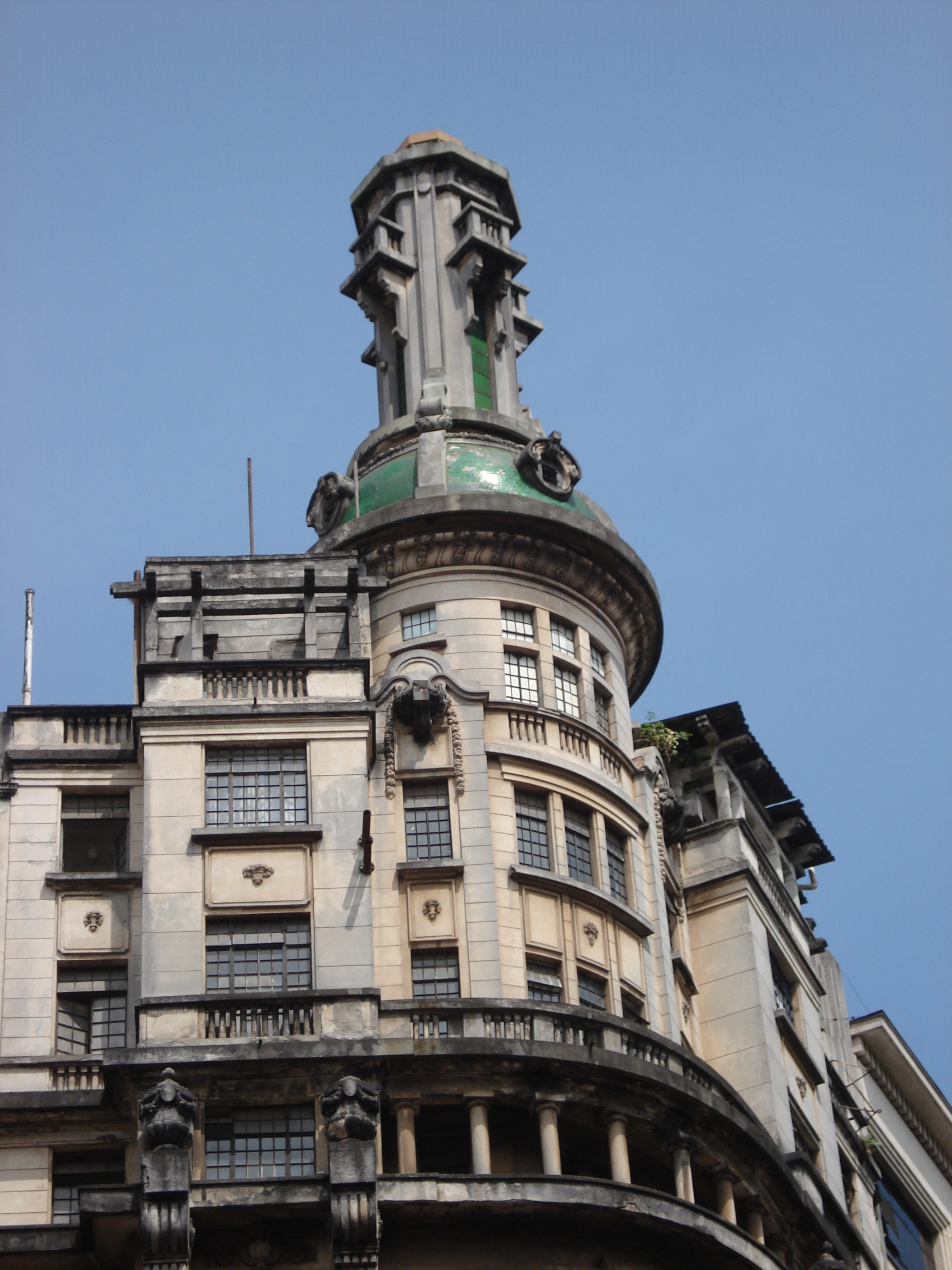

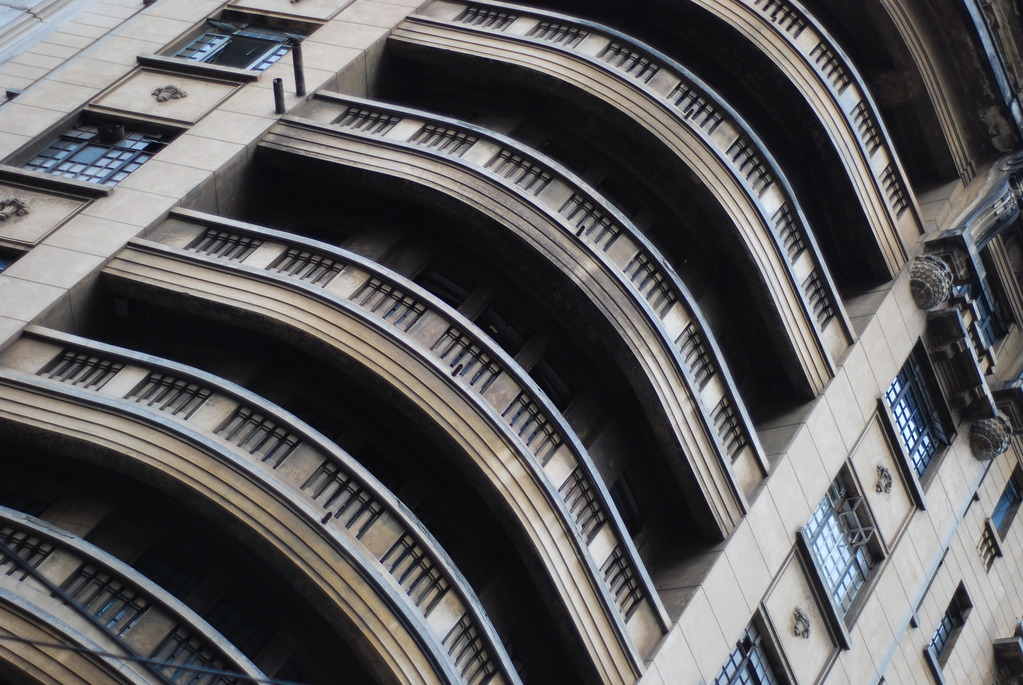
