= Santos Dumont Building =

Skyscraper in Rio de Janeiro, Brazil

- Edifício Santos Dumont
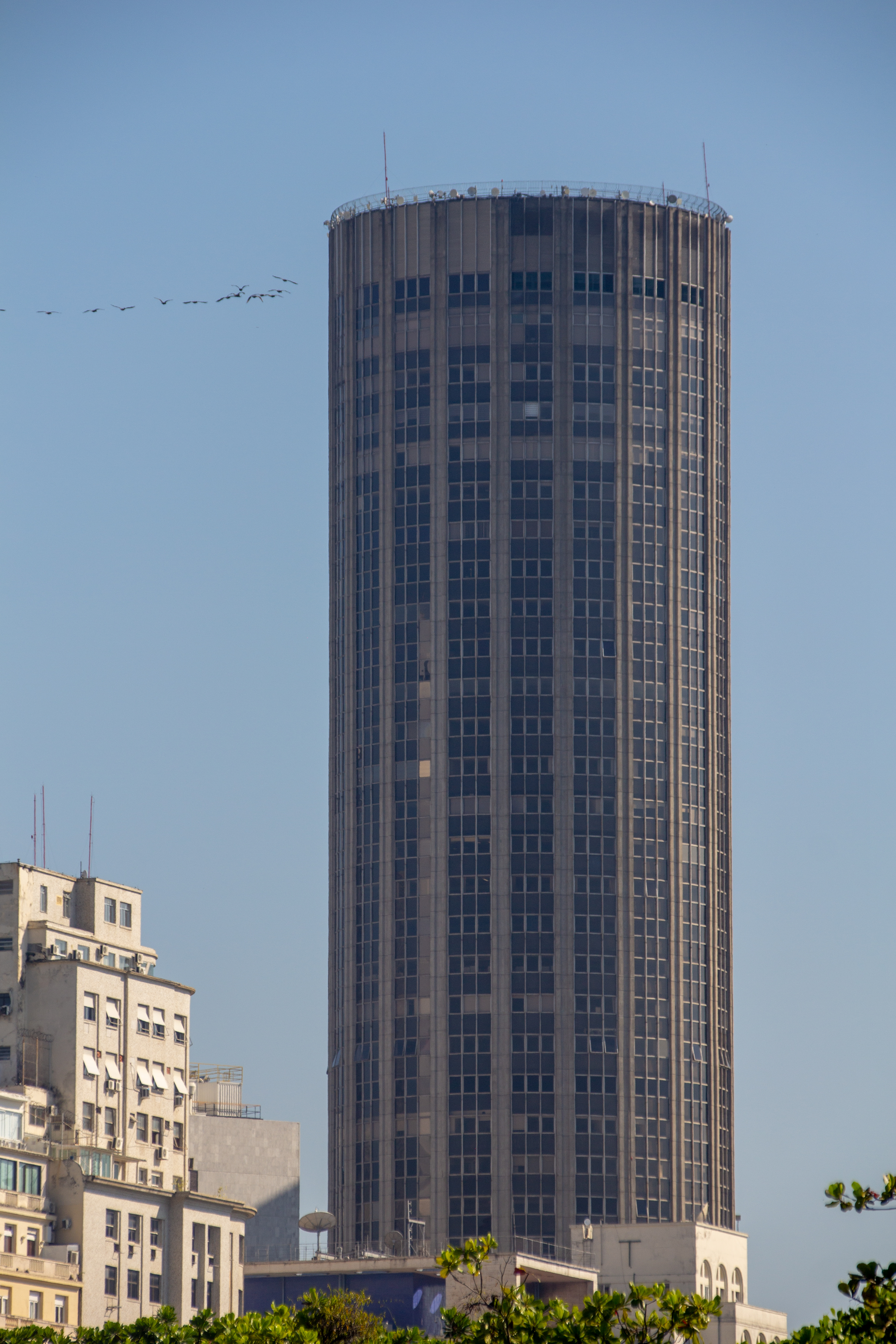
- The Santos Dumont Building in 2019
- Interactive map of the Santos Dumont Building area

General information
- Location: Rio de Janeiro, Brazil
- Coordinates: 22.9106°S 43.1734°W
- Opening: 1975

Height
- Height: 141 m (463 ft)

The Santos Dumont Building (Portuguese: Edifício Santos Dumont) is an office skyscraper in Rio de Janeiro, Brazil.

It has a circular footprint and it is located in the Centro neighbourhood. The building, inaugurated in 1975, has a height of 141 meters and has 45 floors.

== See also ==
- List of tallest buildings in Rio de Janeiro
