= Conde Pereira Carneiro Building =

Skyscraper in Rio de Janeiro, Brazil

- Edifício Conde Pereira Carneiro
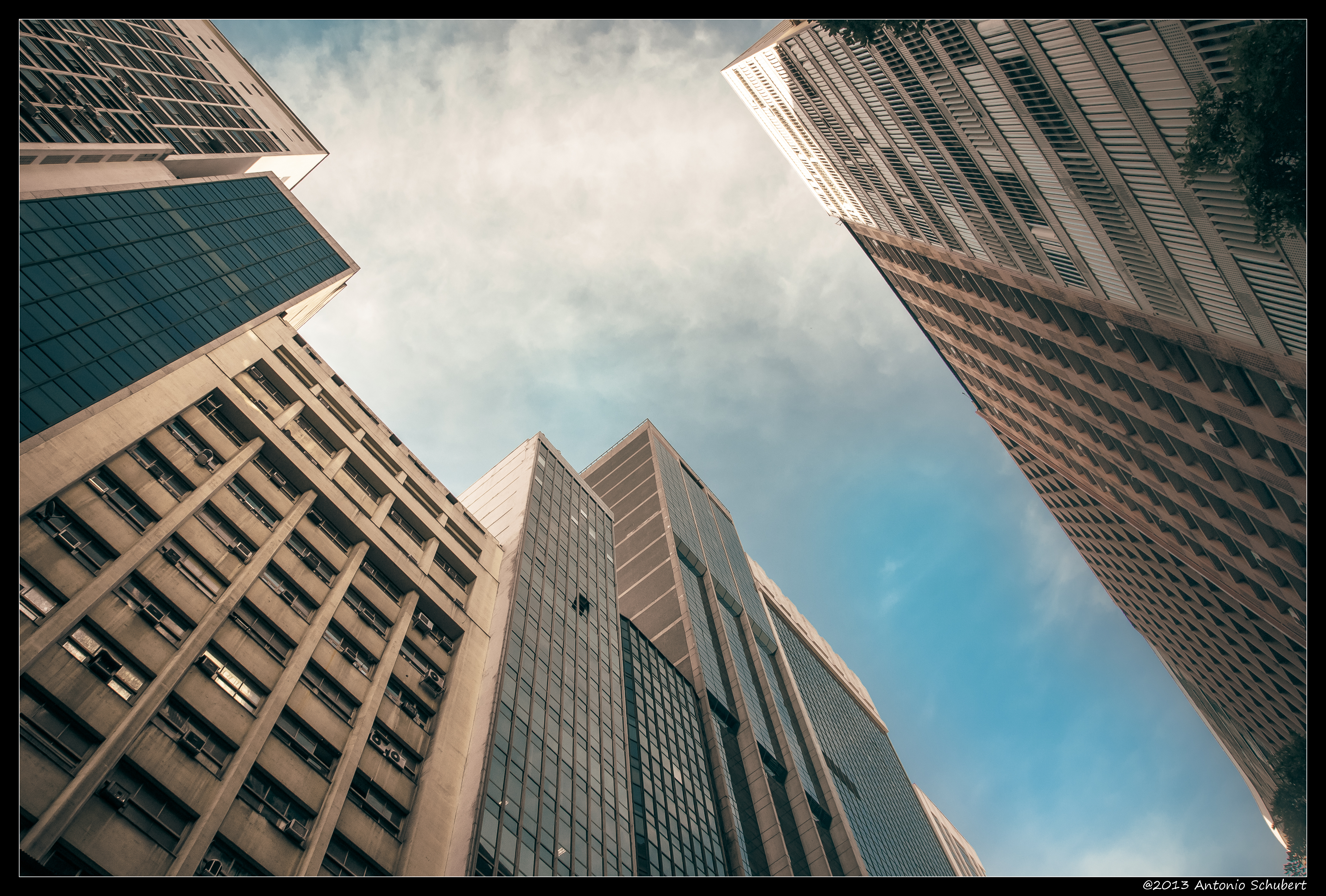
- The Conde Pereira Carneiro Building, at the center, in 2013
- Interactive map of the Conde Pereira Carneiro Building area

General information
- Location: Rio de Janeiro, Brazil
- Coordinates: 22.904272°S 43.178245°W
- Opening: 1976

Height
- Height: 145 m (476 ft)

The Conde Pereira Carneiro Building (Portuguese: Edifício Conde Pereira Carneiro) is an office skyscraper in Rio de Janeiro, Brazil.

== History ==
The tower, built on the site of the historic headquarters of the newspaper Jornal do Brasil, was completed in 1976.

== Description ==
The building is located along Avenida Rio Branco in the Centro district of Rio de Janeiro and has a height of 145 meters and 43 floors.

== See also ==
- List of tallest buildings in Rio de Janeiro
