= Sampaio Moreira Building =

Historic building in São Paulo, Brazil

- Edifício Sampaio Moreira
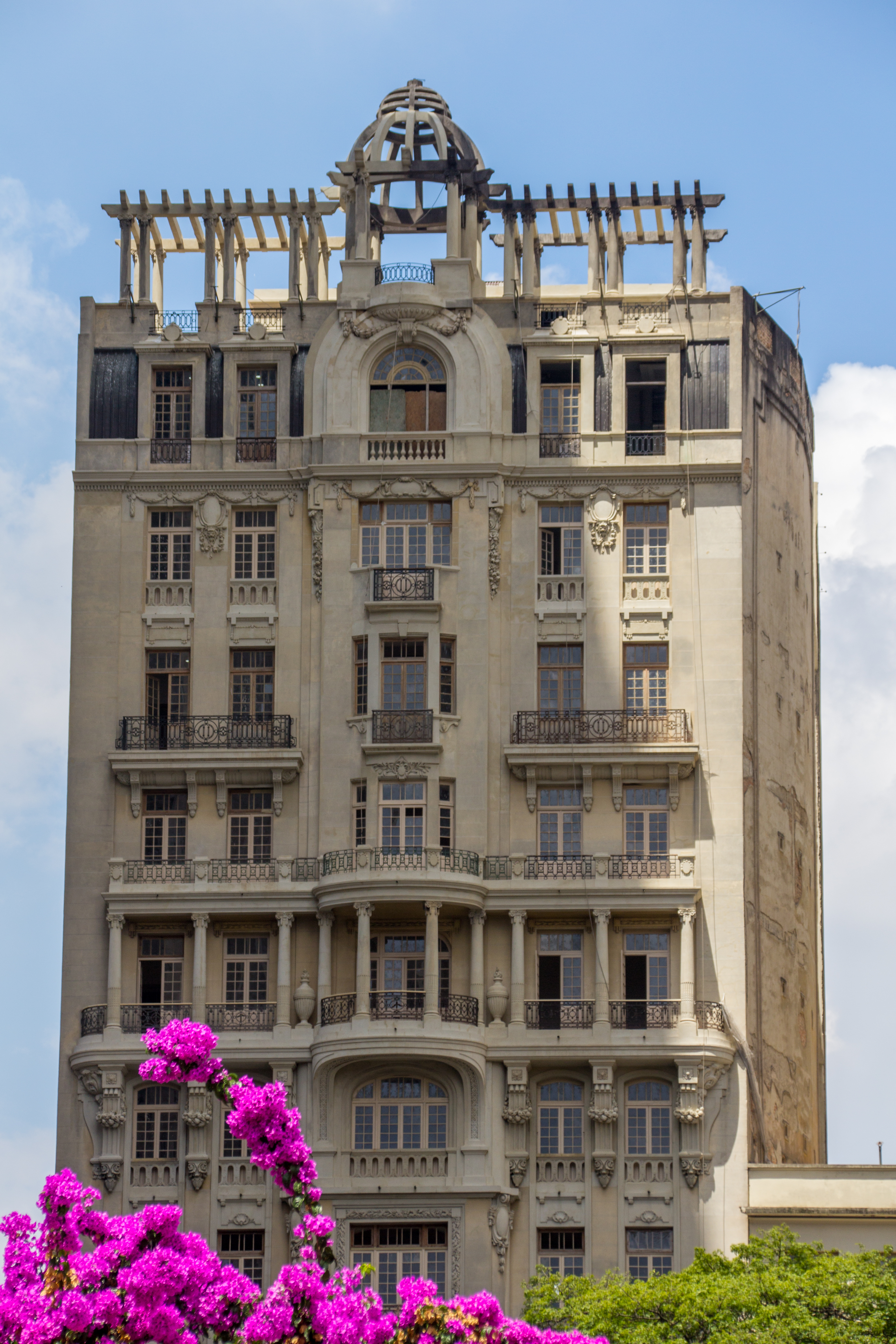

- Location within São Paulo Location within Brazil

General information
- Status: Listed by CONPRESP Resolution nº 37/92 in 2004
- Architectural style: Eclectic
- Location: 346, Libero Badaró street, São Paulo, Brazil
- Coordinates: 23°32′48″S 46°38′10″W
- Year built: 1924

The Sampaio Moreira Building (Portuguese: Edifício Sampaio Moreira) is located at 346 Líbero Badaró Street, in the central region of São Paulo. With twelve floors and a height of 50 metres (160 ft), the building was named Sampaio Moreira after its owner José de Sampaio Moreira (1866–1943), a merchant who the architect Christiano Stockler convinced in 1920 to make the building that would complete the Anhangabaú Park monument, which was finished four years later.

== History ==
A part of São Paulo's eclectic architecture, the building was designed by the architects Christiano Stockler and Samuel das Neves. With twelve floors and a height of 50 metres (160 ft), the Sampaio Moreira was the tallest building in São Paulo from 1924, when it was inaugurated, until 1929, when it was surpassed by the Martinelli Building. It is thus considered to be the first large multi-storey building in São Paulo, as well as one of the first in the country of its kind.

Considered the "prototype" of São Paulo's skyscrapers - built at a time when the city's buildings had a maximum of four floors, the Sampaio Moreira is listed by CONPRESP (Municipal Council for the Preservation of São Paulo's Historical Heritage) due to its historical and architectural importance.

It was managed by the Sampaio Moreira family and used as a commercial building. Since its inauguration, the first floor of the building has been home to Mercearia Godinho, a traditional commercial establishment in São Paulo, founded in 1890, then located at Praça da Sé.

In the 1980s, restoration work was carried out on its main façade.

In 2010 the building was expropriated by the São Paulo City Hall, and in 2012 work began on its recovery and restoration.

In January 2013, the Casa Godinho grocery store was the first commercial establishment to be awarded the title of intangible cultural heritage of São Paulo by the Municipal Council for the Preservation of the Historical, Cultural and Environmental Heritage of the City of São Paulo. Thanks to the grocery store, the Sampaio Moreira, where it was located, hosted great names in Brazilian history, such as Assis Chateaubriand, Adhemar de Barros and Jânio Quadros.

The skyscraper was designed in 1920 and completed four years later. Initially, it was supposed to be a residential building, then residential and commercial. However, it retained only commercial use from its inauguration until its closing. During its operation, it accommodated offices where goldsmiths, lawyers, engineers and architects worked.

When the building was closed in 2010, some of the floors were made available for young artists to set up studios and use the space to create, providing a new use for it. The works created during this period were even exhibited in the building's garage.

According to the current schedule, the building should be completely restored and reopened by the end of 2017. Sampaio Moreira is expected to house the Municipal Culture Department and to have other notable modifications to its thirteen floors.

== Architectural features ==
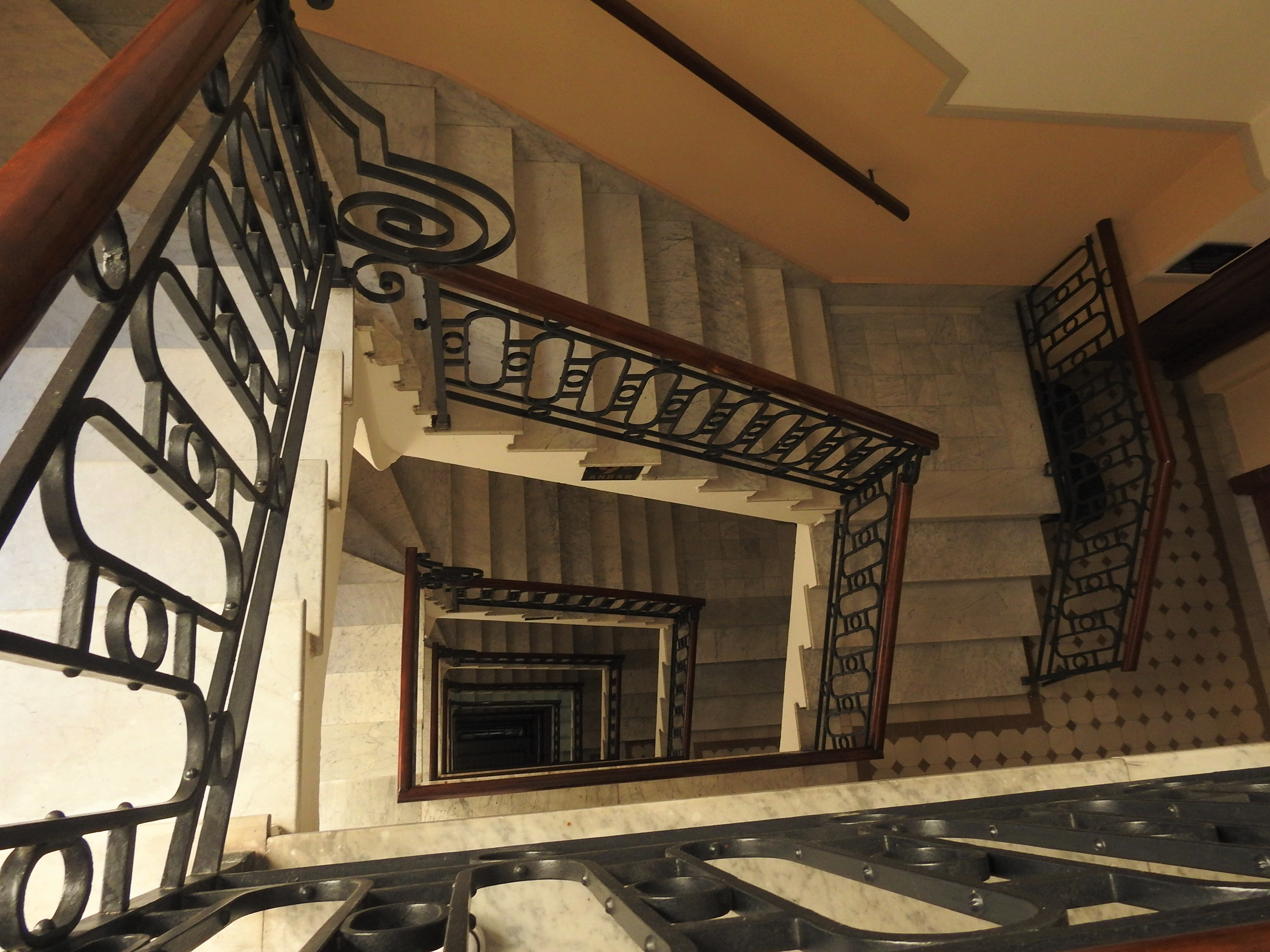
Indoor staircase

Sampaio Moreira was built with reinforced concrete, a structure that uses frames made from steel bars. It has 5,360 km^{2} (2,070 sq mi) of built area and a land area of 596 km^{2} (230 sq mi). With an eclectic architectural style, it has typical Louis XVI-style decoration, which mixes rococo and neoclassicism. Its structure is rich in detail and the façade changes from floor to floor. It underwent a major structural renovation in 1990, but several features have been preserved, such as the Carrara marble staircases and the riga pine window frames, as well as the pergola of Greek columns on the roof.

== Historical and cultural significance ==
At the time of its construction, the building drew a lot of attention for its exquisite and detailed construction. It represented a major architectural revolution for the city as it was the first tall building to be built with reinforced concrete, as well as being the pioneer of São Paulo's skyscrapers, marking the landscape of the city's central region. Another highlight of the Sampaio Moreira was the permission to use its roof.

=== Heritage listing ===
The building was listed in 1992, as stated in CONPRESP Resolution nº 37/92. The document decided to list another 292 buildings located in the Anhangabaú Valley area. Sampaio Moreira was classified at protection level III, which corresponds to properties of historical, architectural and landscape interest and determines the preservation of its external characteristics. The process allows for the restoration, revitalization and renovation of the property, subject to prior approval by CONPRESP.

== Current situation ==
The building's restoration project was designed by the São Paulo architectural firm Kruchin Arquitetura. Initially, the renovation was budgeted at 14 million reais and was due to be completed in 2016. However, there have been recurring delays and the building should only be reopened by the end of 2017, completely restored, with work already worth 20 million reais. The thirteen-storey Sampaio Moreira will become the new home of the Municipal Culture Department, currently located on São João Avenue, also downtown.

In September 2018, the building was reopened and restored after seven years of renovations, and became the new headquarters of the Municipal Culture Department.

The project also includes an auditorium, an open square, an internal garden and a restaurant on the roof of the building, which offers a great view of the Vale do Anhangabaú. However, according to the City Hall, not everything will be completed in the first stage. The square, for example, which will be built on a 400 km^{2} (150 sq mi) area next to the building, should be left to the next stage. Only the fifth floor, which held the office of Christiano Stockler das Neves, will be faithful to the old Sampaio Moreira. The floor will become a memorial, in which even the marks on the wall where Neves hung paintings will be kept, preserving the history of the place down to the smallest detail.

== Gallery ==
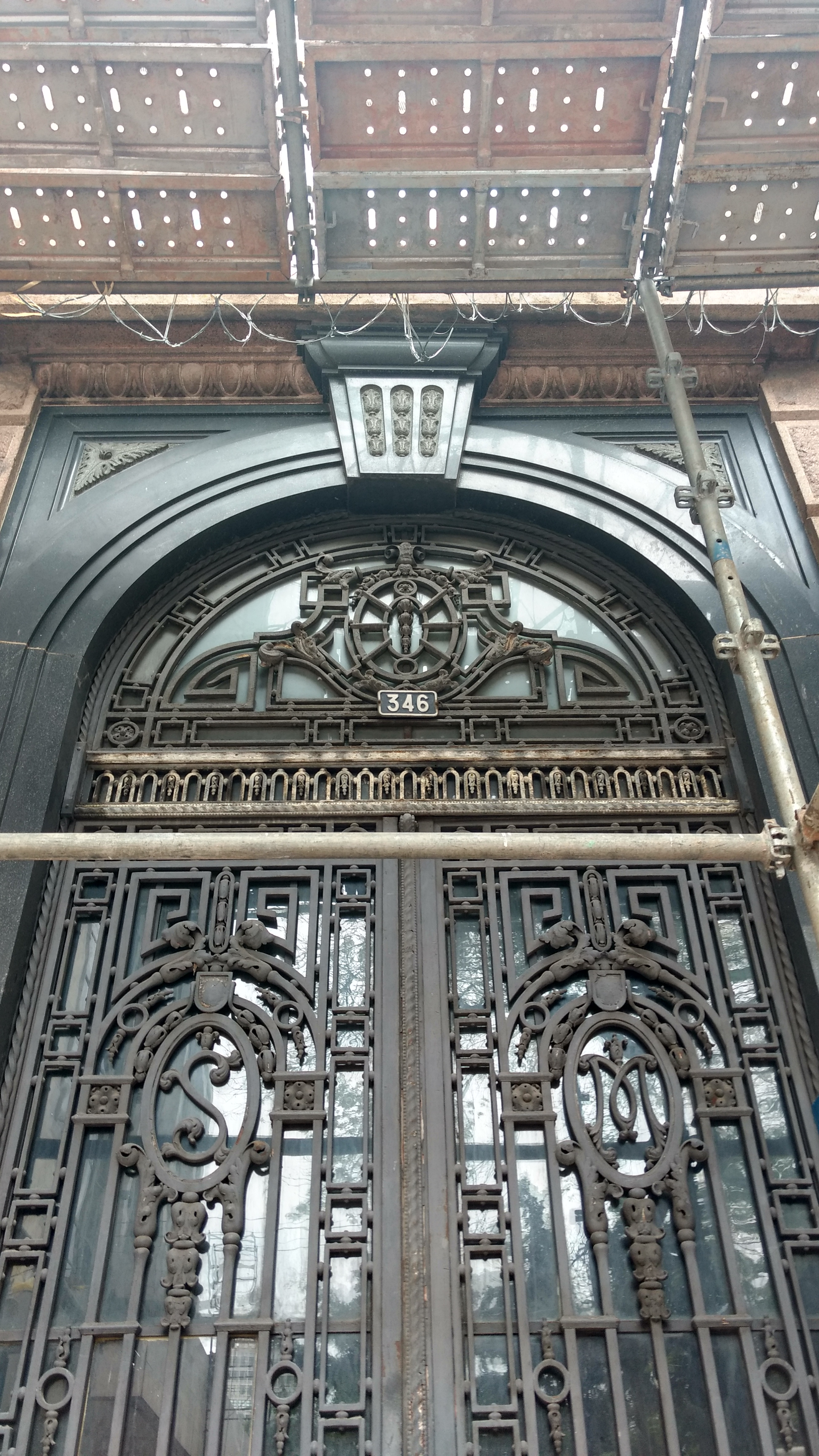
Entrance

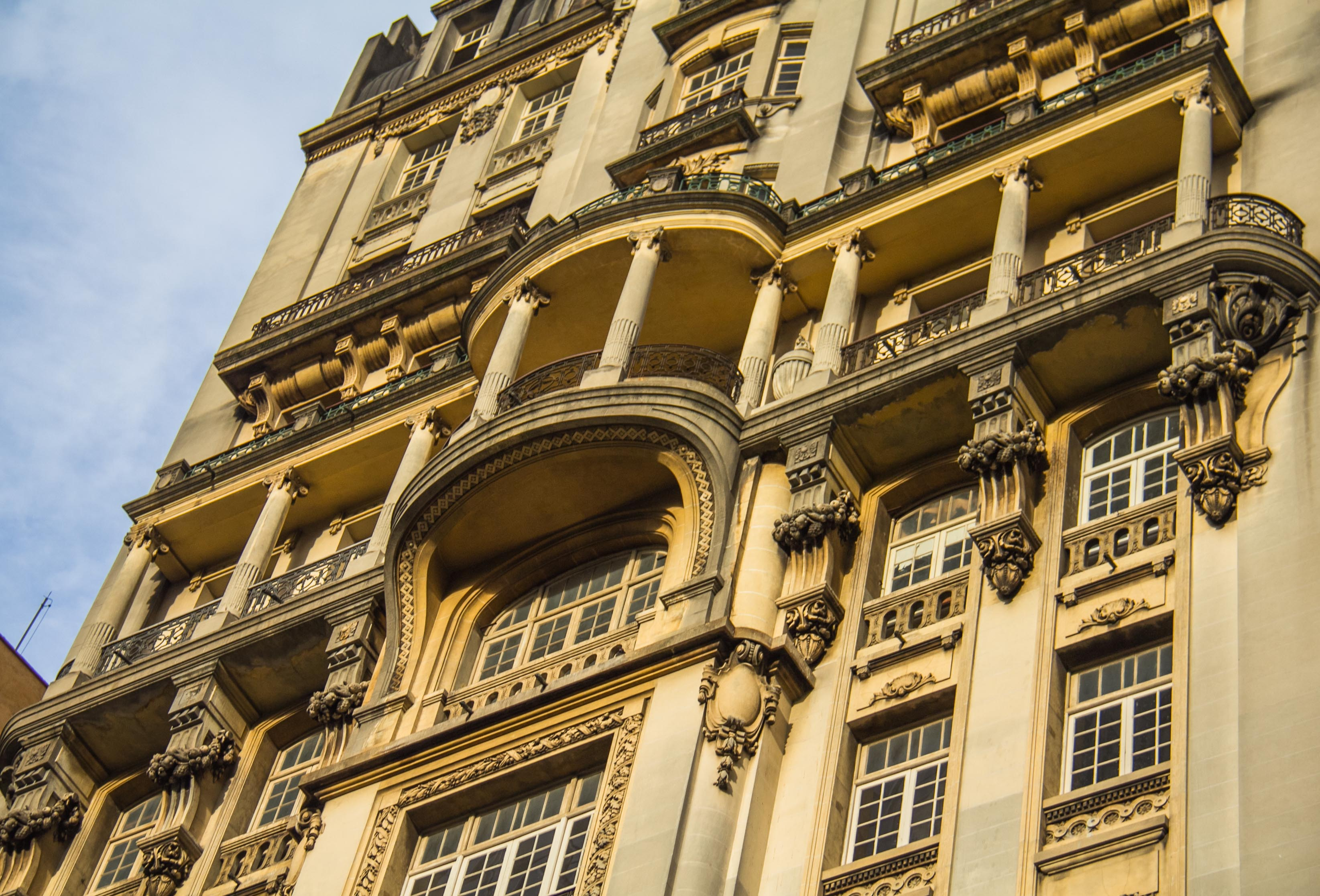
Details of the upper façade.

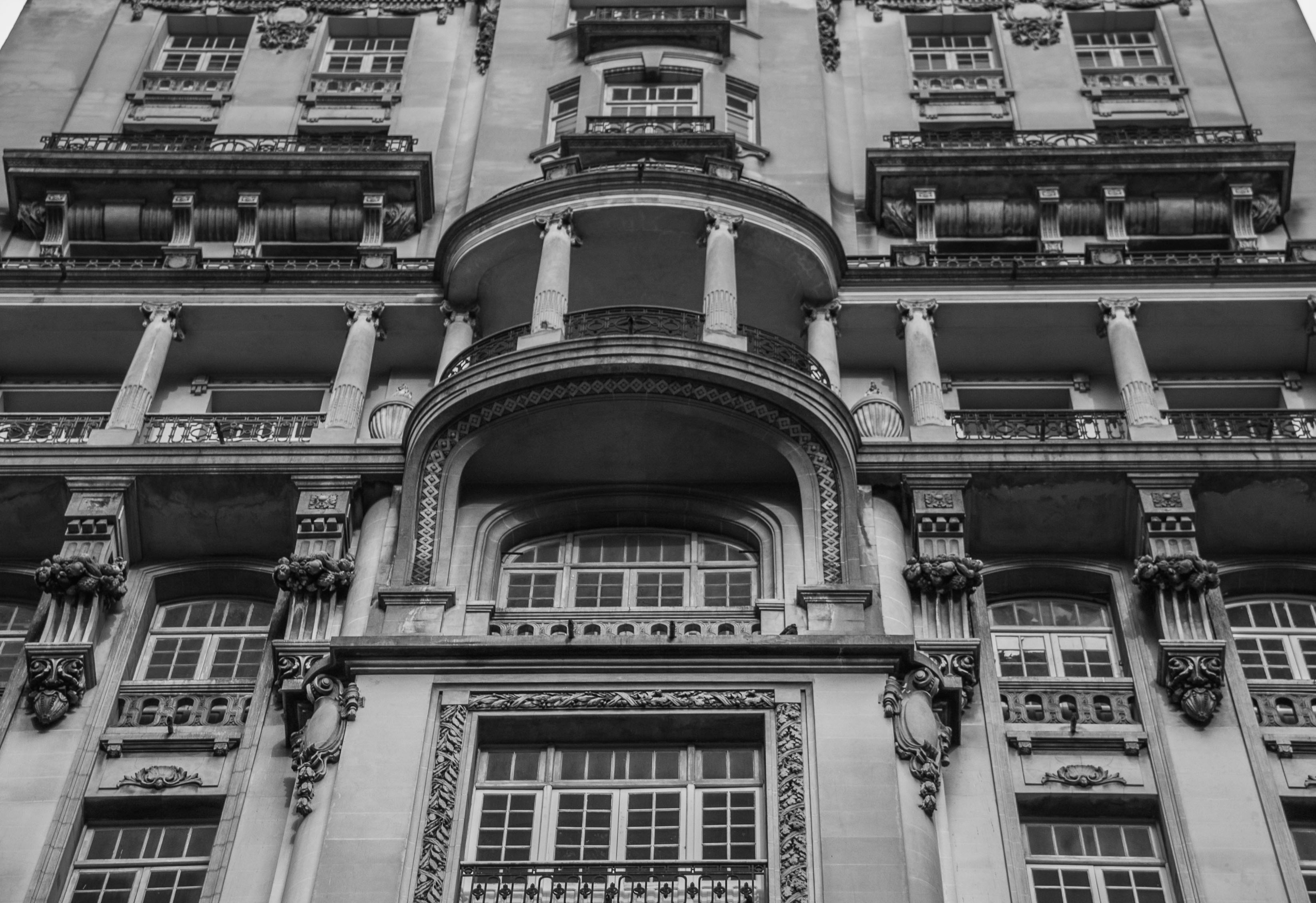
Black and white details.

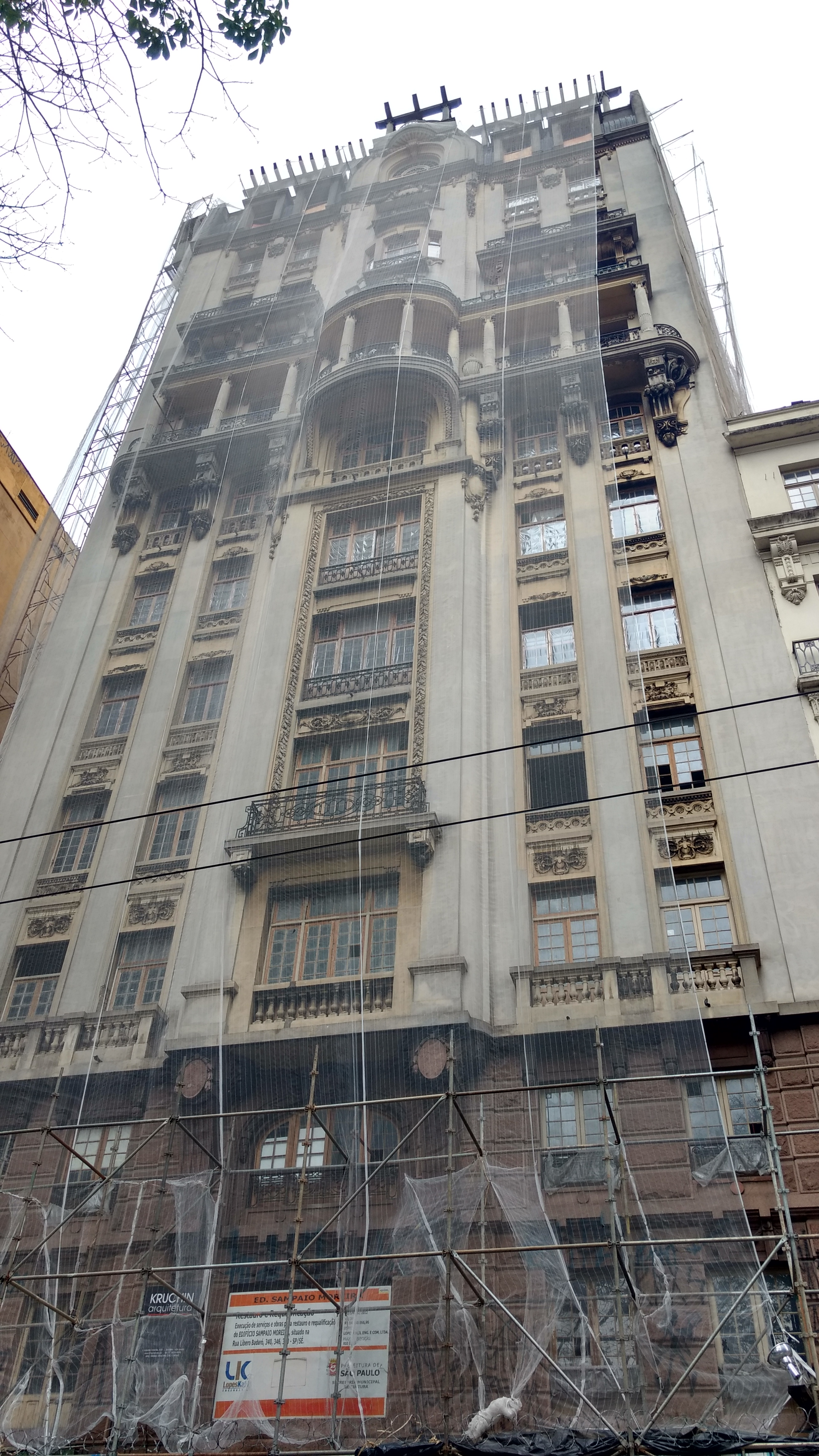
Sampaio Moreira building under renovation

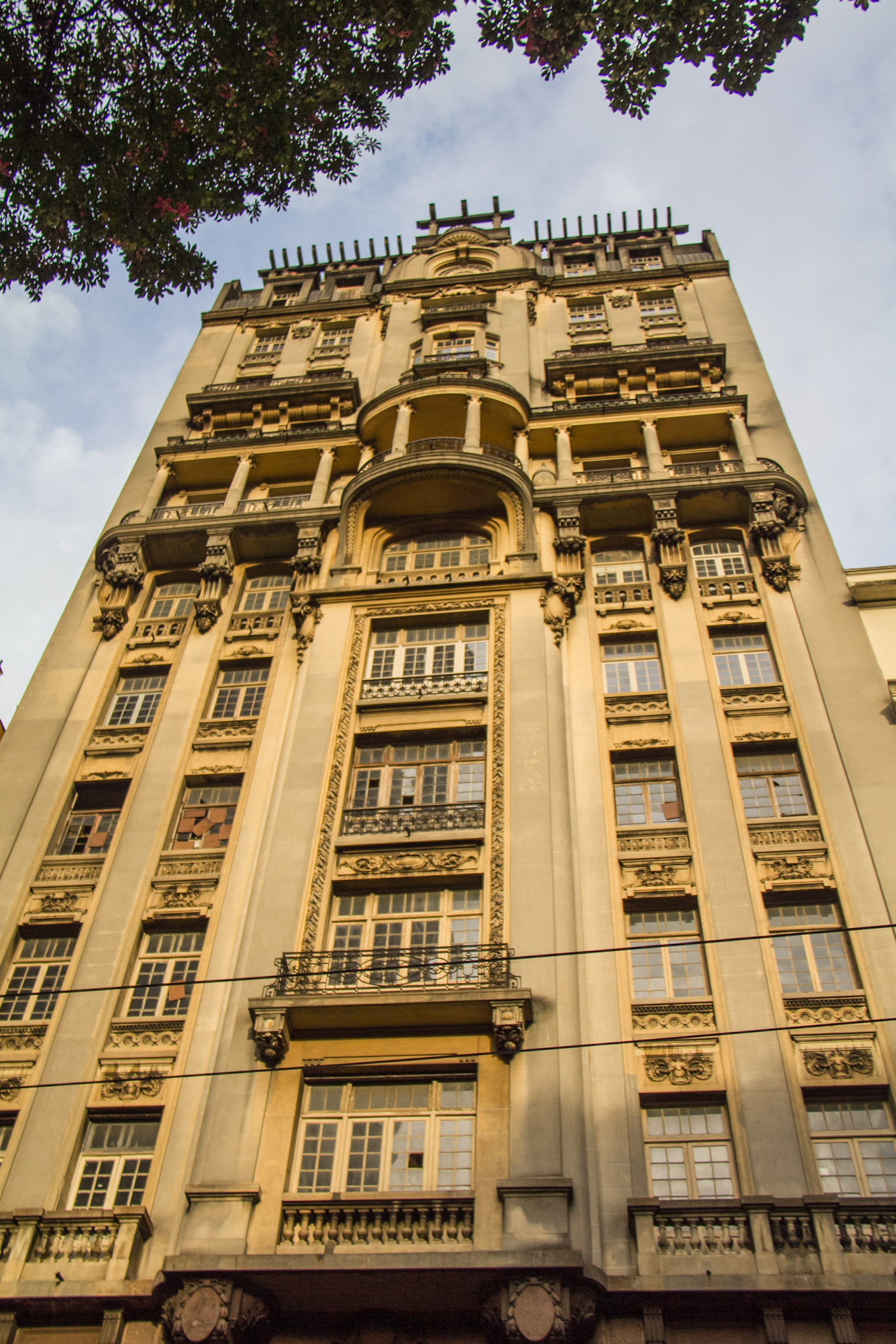
The façade illuminated in the afternoon during fall.

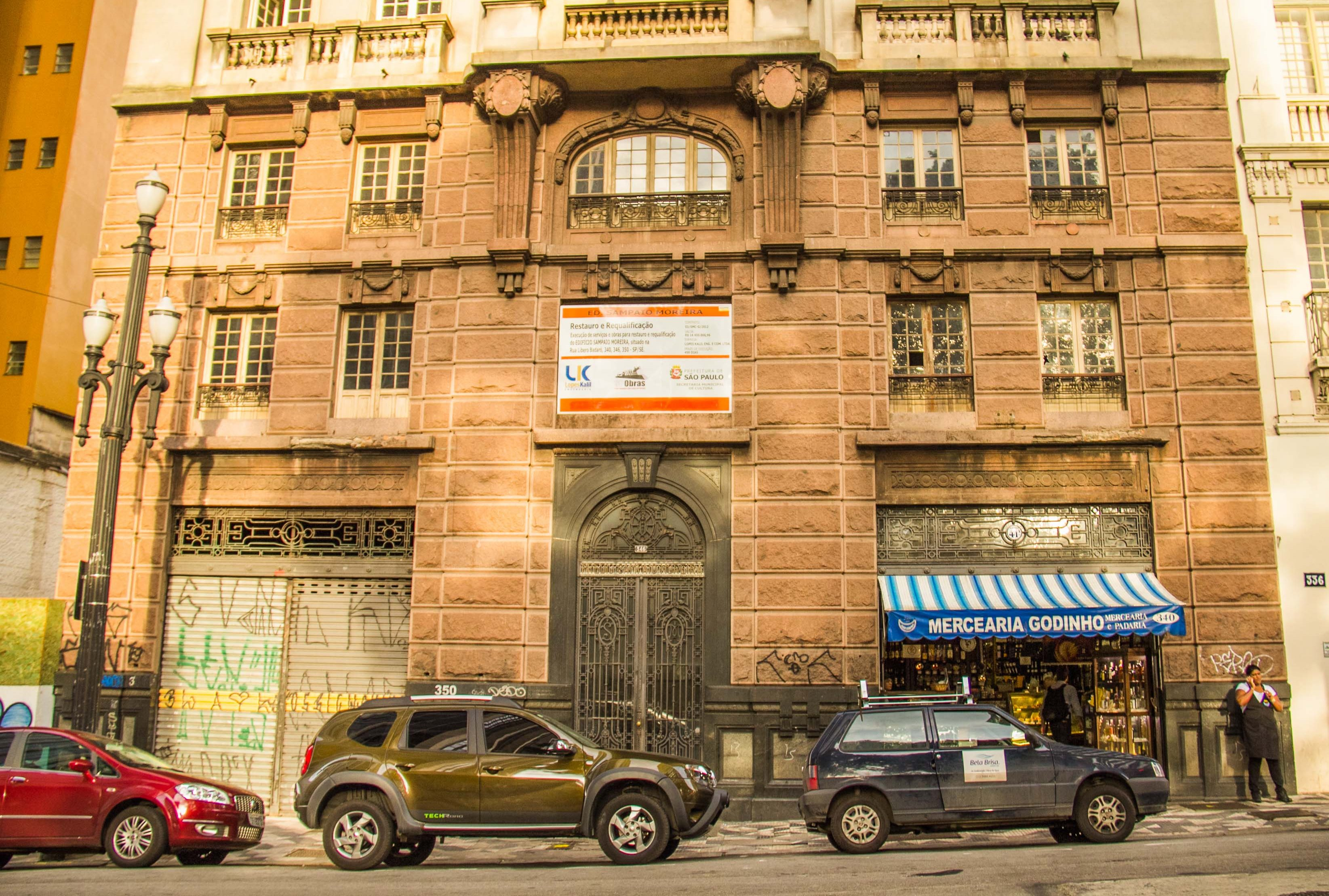
First floors and entrance to the building.

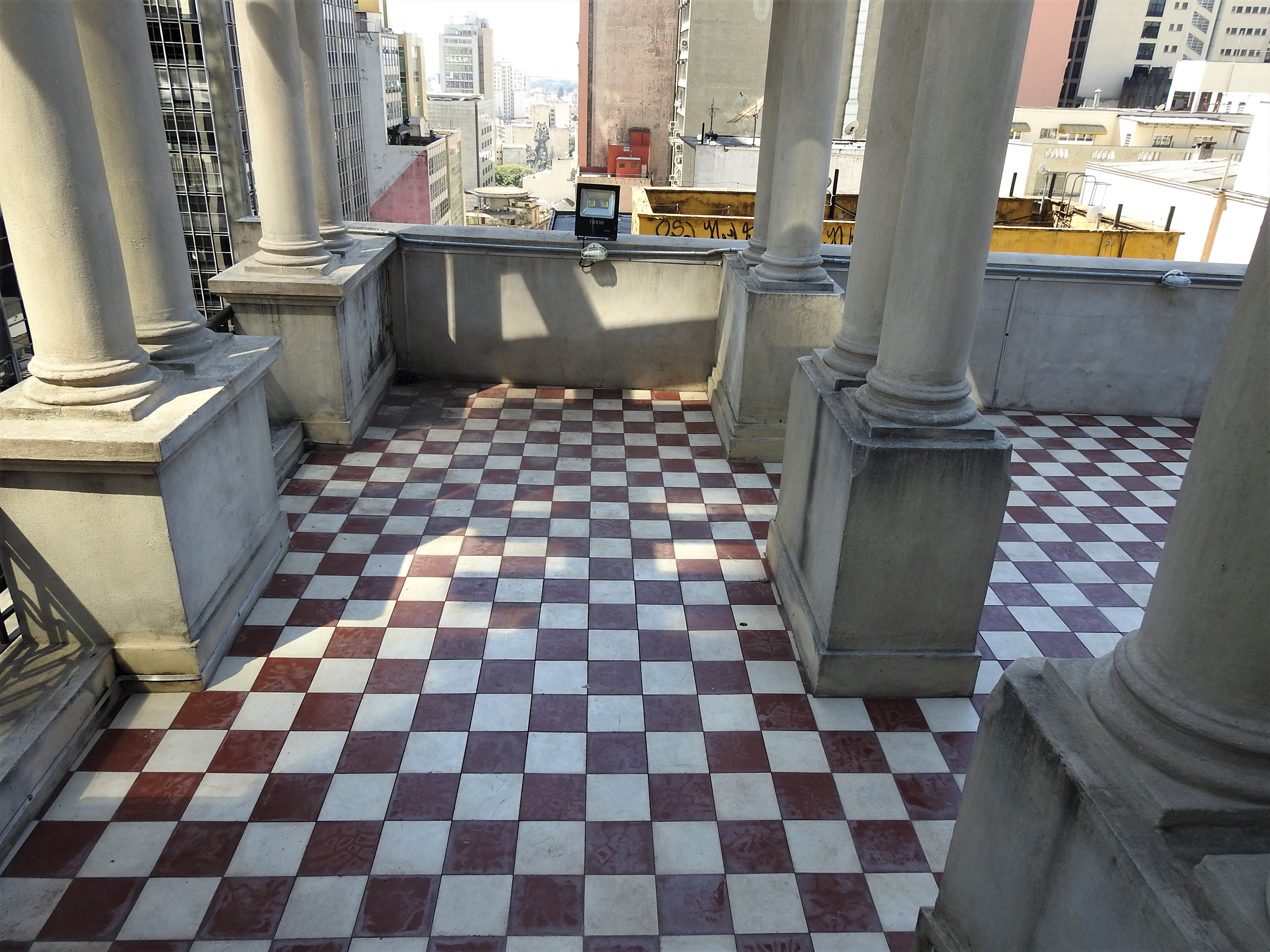
Terrace.

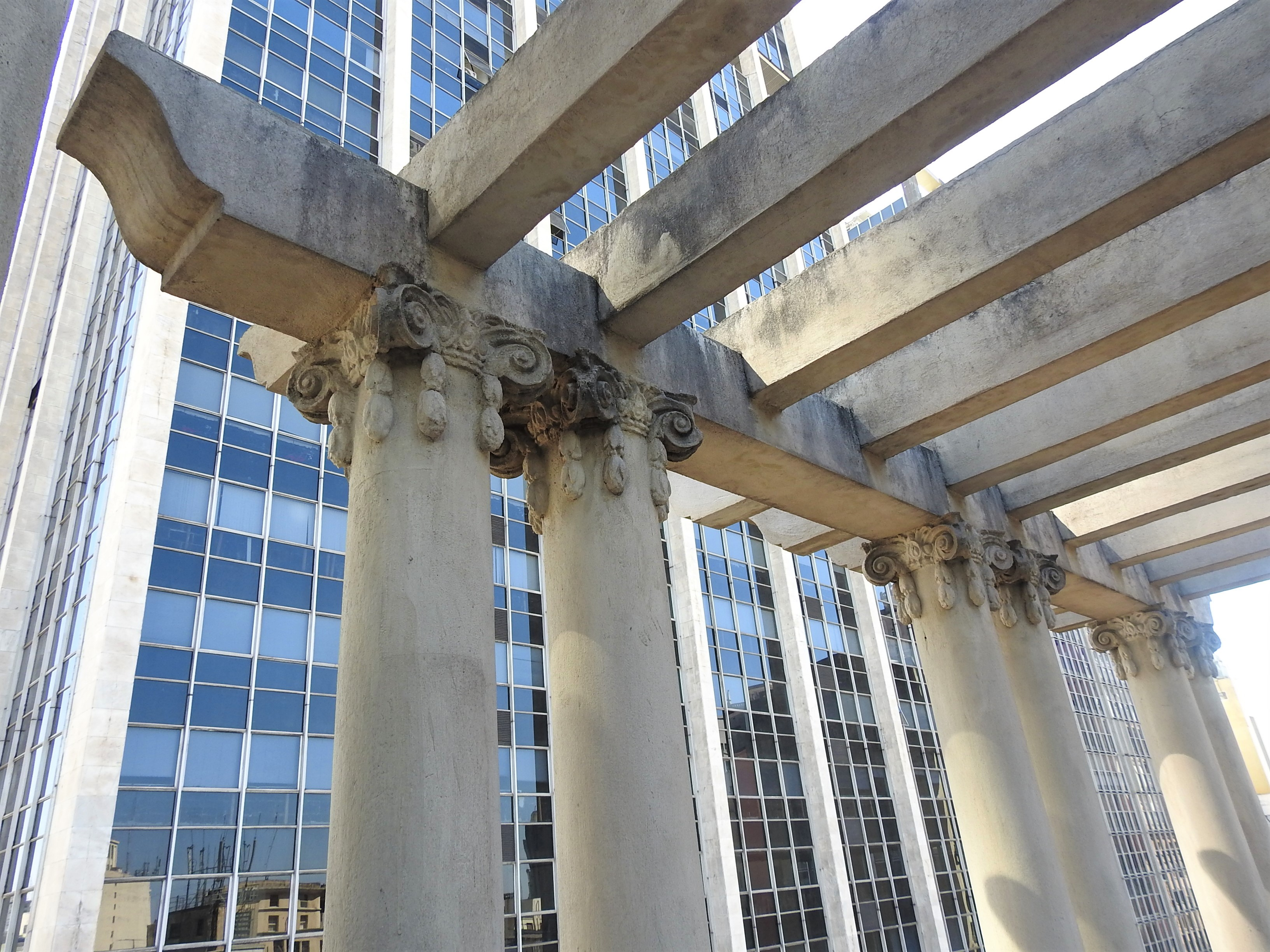
Greek columns

== See also ==
- Council for the Defense of Historical, Archaeological, Artistic and Tourist Heritage
- São Paulo
- Vale do Anhangabaú

== Bibliography ==
- HOMEM, Maria Cecília Naclério. The Martinelli building: the rise of the immigrant and the verticalization of São Paulo. São Paulo, Projeto, 1984. (in Portuguese)
- SOUKEF Junior and RUBINO, Silvana: Estação Júlio Prestes. São Paulo, Prêmio Editorial, 1997. (in Portuguese)

Awards and achievements titles
Preceded by -	Tallest building in Brazil; 1924 - 1929; 50 m	Succeeded by Joseph Gire Building
Awards and achievements titles
Preceded by -	Tallest building in São Paulo; 1924 - 1934; 50 m	Succeeded by Martinelli Building
