= Banco do Brasil Building =

Skyscraper in São Paulo, Brazil

- Edifício do Banco do Brasil
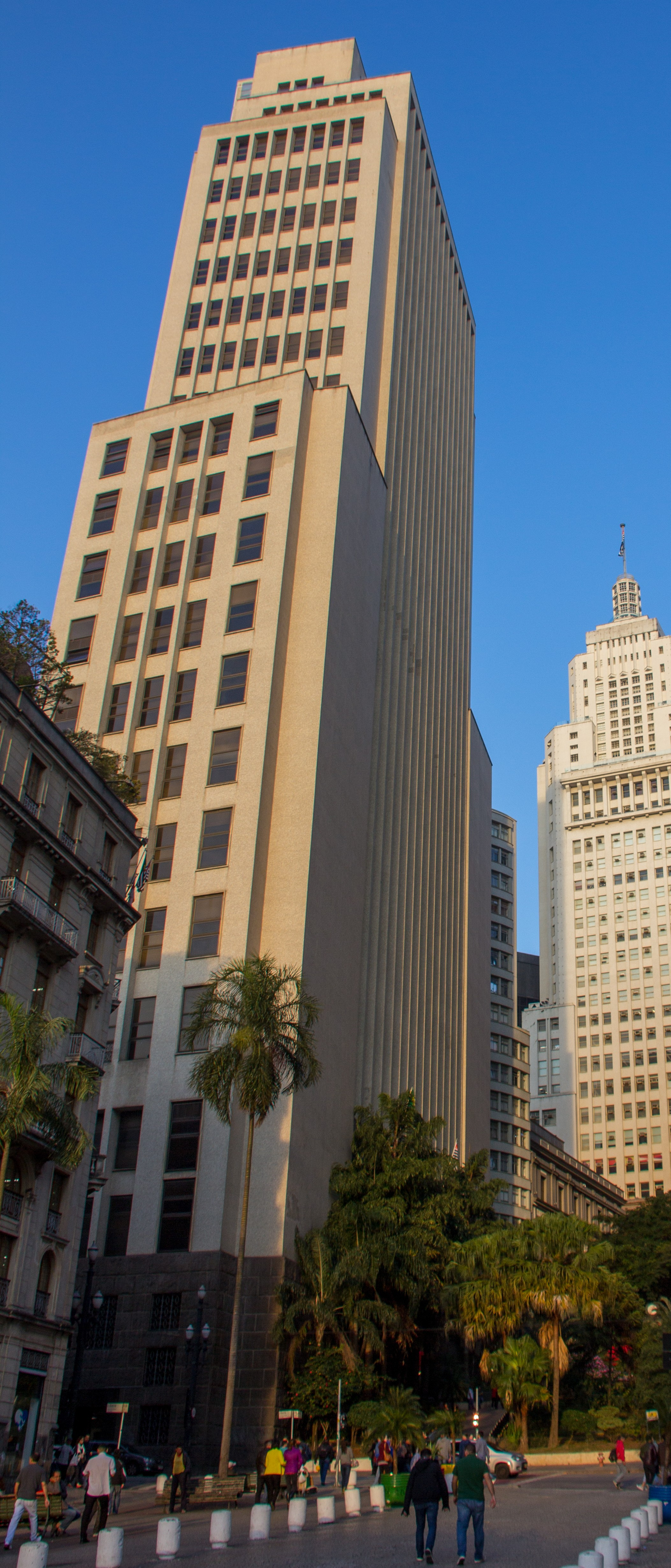
- The Banco do Brasil Building in 2018
- Interactive map of the Banco do Brasil Building area

General information
- Location: São Paulo, Brazil
- Coordinates: 23.545139°S 46.634833°W
- Opening: 1982

Height
- Height: 143 m (469 ft)

The Banco do Brasil Building (Portuguese: Edifício do Banco do Brasil) is a skyscraper in São Paulo, Brazil.

== History ==
The tower, built to house the new headquarters of Banco do Brasil after the bank relocated from its original offices on Rua Álvares Penteado, was completed in 1955.

== Description ==
The building is located in the city center of São Paulo, opposite the older Martinelli Building. It features a distinctive stepped design and has a height of 143 meters and 24 floors.

== Gallery ==
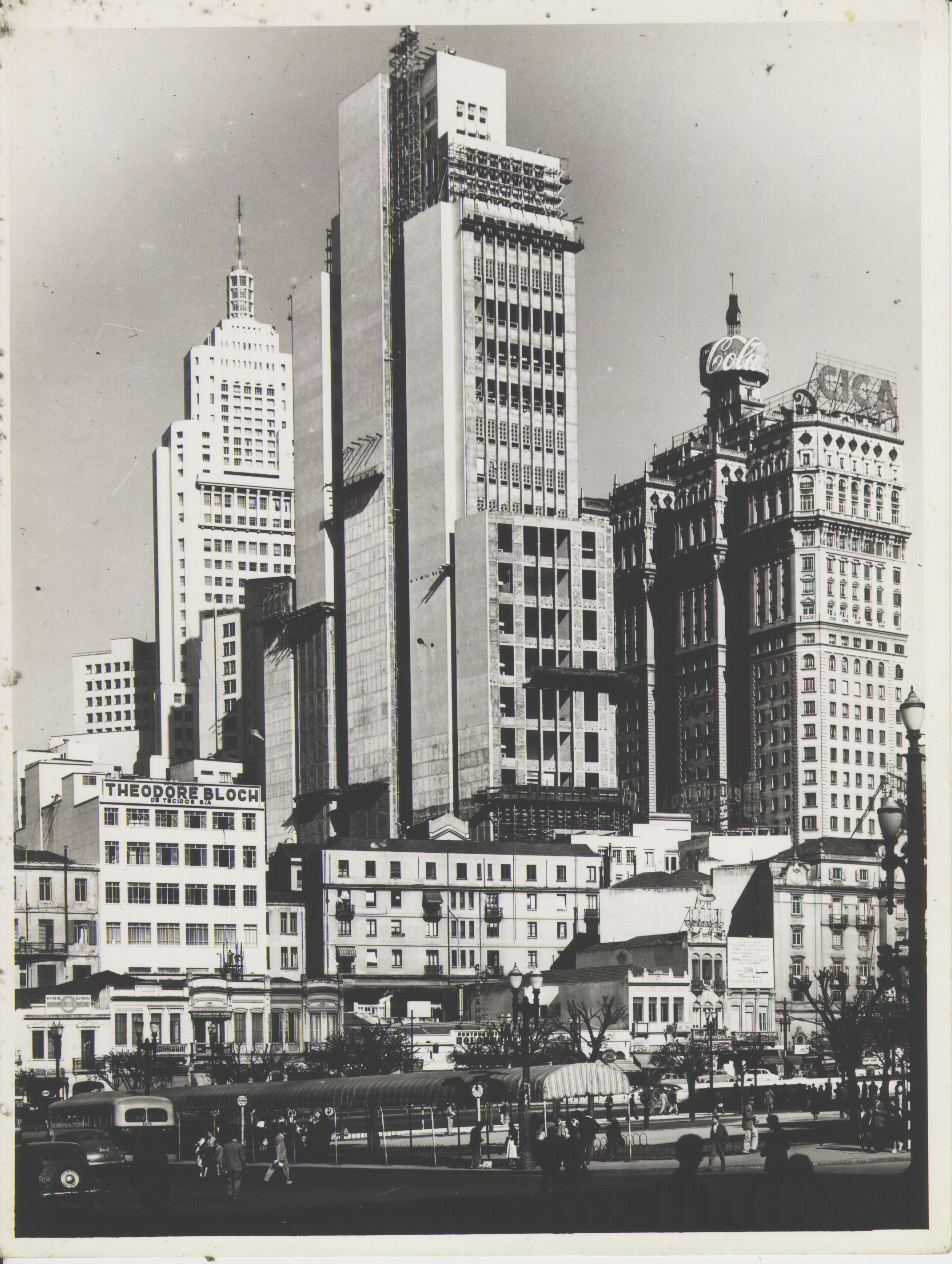

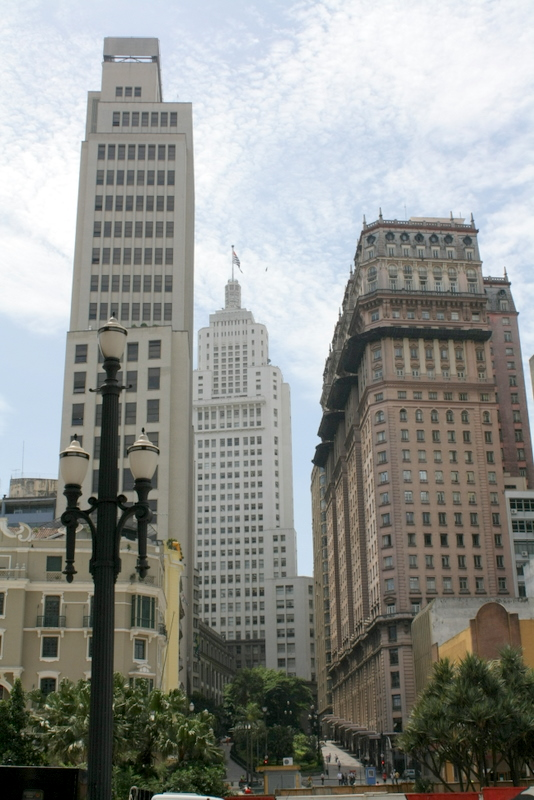

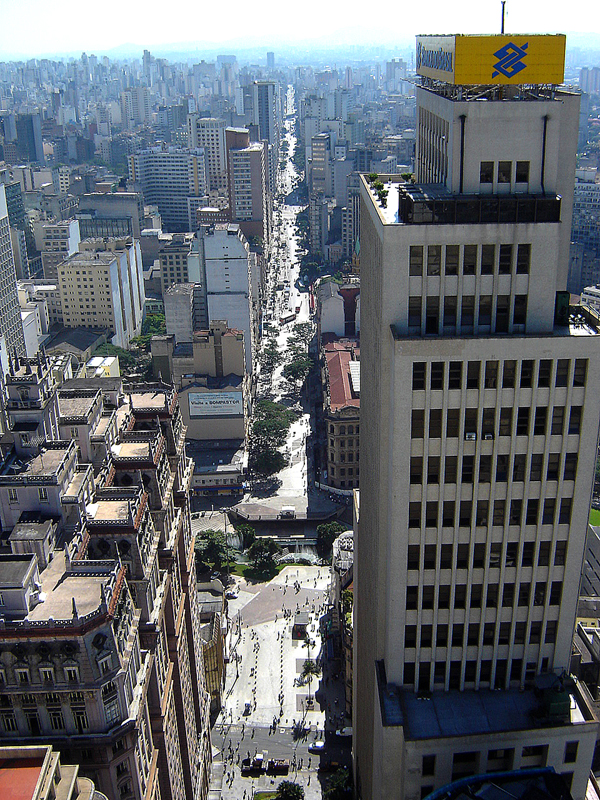

== See also ==
- List of tallest buildings in São Paulo
