= BNDES Building =

Skyscraper in Rio de Janeiro, Brazil

- Edifício BNDES
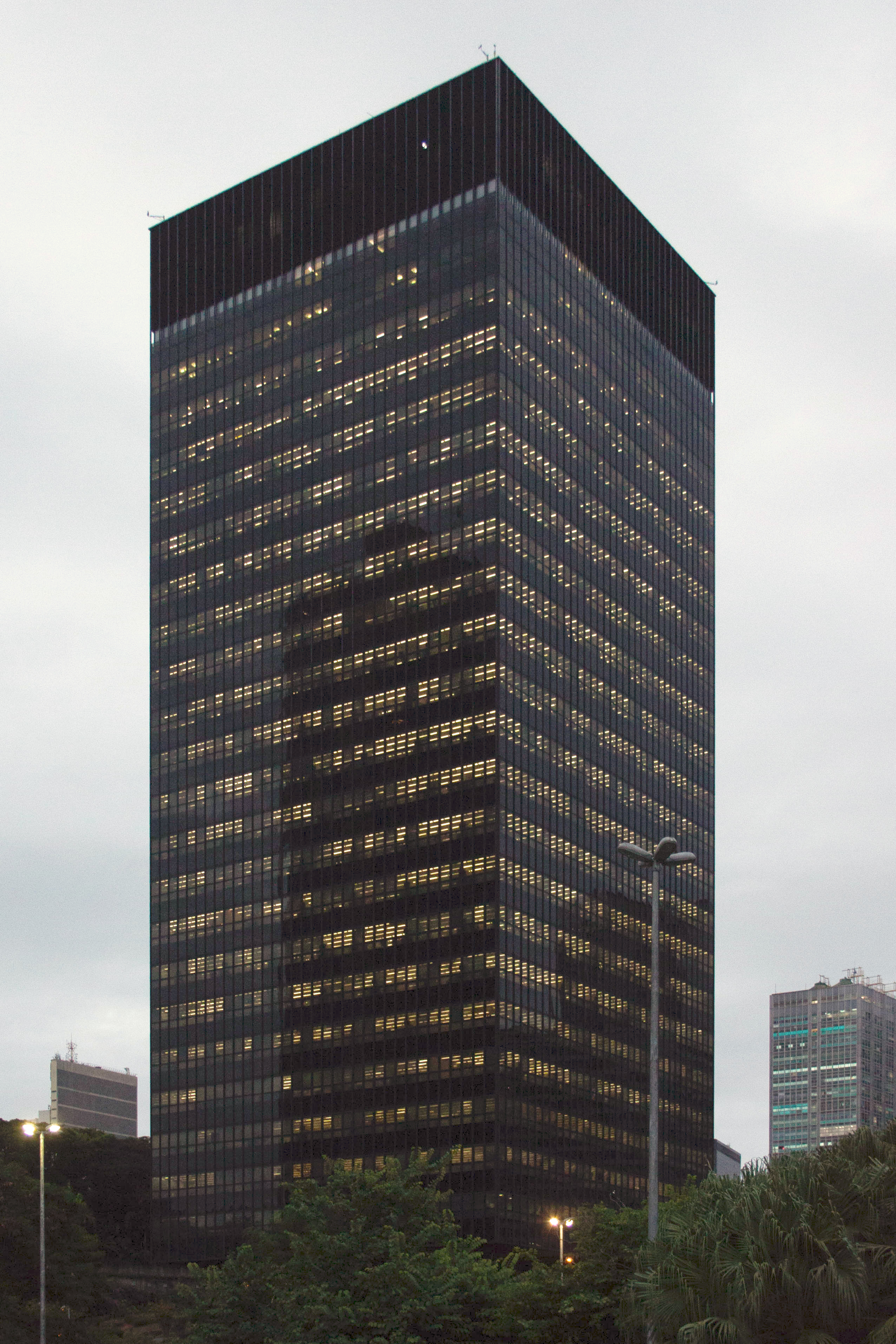
- The BNDES Building in 2018
- Interactive map of the BNDES Building area

General information
- Location: Rio de Janeiro, Brazil
- Coordinates: 22.908519°S 43.179984°W
- Opening: 1982

Height
- Height: 129 m (423 ft)

The BNDES Building (Portuguese: Edifício BNDES) is a skyscraper in Rio de Janeiro, Brazil.

== History ==
The tower, built to house the new headquarters of the Banco Nacional de Desenvolvimento Econômico e Social, was completed in 1982.

== Description ==
The building is located in the Centro district of Rio de Janeiro and has a height of 129 meters and 29 floors.

== See also ==
- List of tallest buildings in Rio de Janeiro
