= Cândido Mendes Center =

Skyscraper in Rio de Janeiro, Brazil

- Centro Cândido Mendes
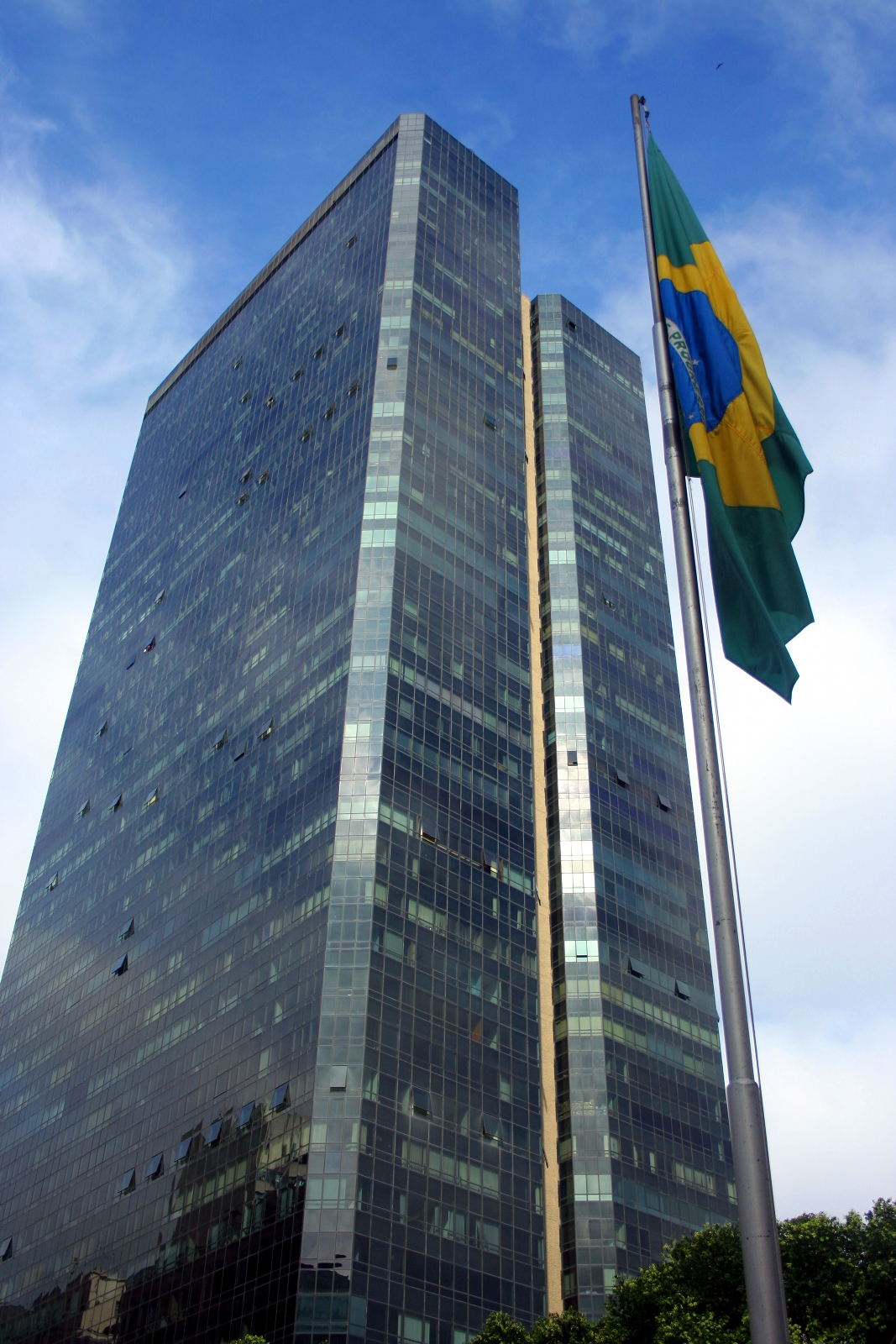
- The Cândido Mendes Center in 2007
- Interactive map of the Cândido Mendes Center area

General information
- Location: Rio de Janeiro, Brazil
- Coordinates: 22.9038°S 43.1752°W
- Opening: 1982

Height
- Height: 140 m (459 ft)

The Cândido Mendes Center (Portuguese: Centro Cândido Mendes) is a skyscraper in Rio de Janeiro, Brazil.

== History ==
Designed by the architectural firm of Harry James Cole, the building was inaugurated in 1982.

== Description ==
The building is located in the Centro district of Rio de Janeiro and has a height of 140 meters with 43 floors. The tower is intended for office use.

== See also ==
- List of tallest buildings in Rio de Janeiro
