= A Noite =

Brazilian newspaper, 1911–1957

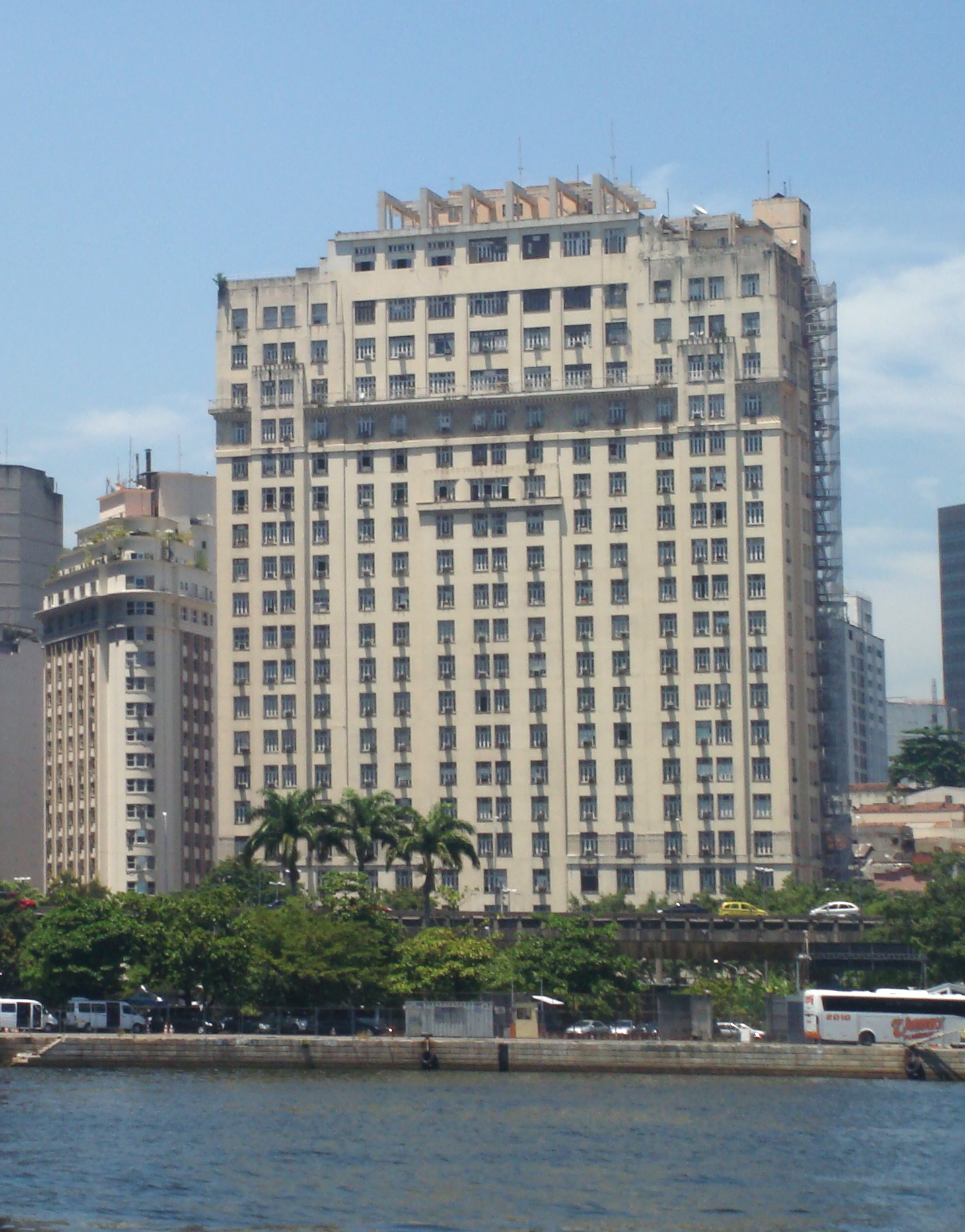
- Edificio do Jornal A Noite in 2012
- Categories: Newspaper
- Frequency: Daily
- Founder: Irineu Marinho
- First issue: 18 July 1911
- Final issue: 27 December 1957
- Country: Brazil
- Language: Portuguese

A Noite (English: The Night) was a Brazilian newspaper based in Rio de Janeiro, Brazil. It was published daily from 18 July 1911 to 27 December 1957 when it stopped publication. Its headquarters, which is located at Praça Mauá in the Central Zone, was erected in the late 1920s.

== History ==
=== Beginnings and popularity ===
A Noite was founded in 1911 by Irineu Marinho, Castelar de Carvalho, Marques da Silva and other idealists, such as the first evening newspaper in Rio de Janeiro. Releasing the news at 7:00pm until around 5:30pm, its popularity grew rapidly, which was also aided by last minute headlines in updated editions. The newspaper had seven daily editions and it was the only evening newspaper in Rio to reach a circulation of around two hundred thousand copies.

=== A turning point ===
In 1925, Irineu left as the director of the newspaper, and he was replaced by Geraldo Rocha. Marinho was in Europe when he learned about Geraldo's plan to make him a minority shareholder in the company. He later left the company and founded the media conglomerate Grupo Globo, and with it came his own newspaper, O Globo.

=== A new headquarters ===
In 1929, the A Noite Building (now the Joseph Gire Building), which was then Rio de Janeiro's tallest building, was inaugurated, serving as A Noite's headquarters. After passing through the hands of French groups, the Federal Government of Brazil (during the Vargas Era) took over the newspaper in 1940. During that decade, under Carvalho Neto's administration, the newspaper returned to a budget balance. However, in the 1950s, it again had a budget deficit.

=== Closure and reception ===
A Noite was later closed towards the end of 1957, during a decision by the superintendent of Companies Incorporated into the National Heritage, which was criticized by other newspapers in Rio de Janeiro. "A Noite was born and grew in the shadow of the popular prestige that it managed to gain during a period of political turmoil", wrote Correio da Manhã. "It reached the maximum, then the descent began, when elements outside the profession took over the sheet. The Revolution of 1930 completed the work by seizing, through confiscation, the company's assets. In the hands of the Government, the decay of the once-dear newspaper became more and more accentuated. It is over now, from a material point of view, but it has long been morally condemned in public opinion. The justice of the people, in these cases, is inexorable.”

However, the daily newspaper Jornal do Brasil argued that the closure of A Noite represented the "administrative incompetence of the Brazilian State": "The public distrust toward the press of any government is such that in less than twenty years, A Noite stopped to be the greatest evening newspaper in the city to perish [from] an inglorious death. It is a melancholy moment in the life of the city and of the Brazilian press, and the Government must have thought a lot, measured not even the solutions and the paths, before making the old capital suffer this new unexpected pain."

Officials told to the Diário Popular that "the closing of A Noite is part of a plan that ranges from its extinction to the transfer of Rádio Nacional and other agencies to the control of a certain economic group" not identified by them. "The newspaper was, really, without resources to support itself", acknowledged editor-in-chief Carvalho Neto. "It is now believed that the newspaper will be sold. The solution for all would be the validity of the decree elaborated in the government of General Dutra, which gave A Noite to employees. They could lease it with the right to purchase the 'historic cost'. The solution we know today is tragic, painful and, above all, melancholy."

== Cultural impact ==
A Noite organized the beauty pageant Miss Brazil in 1929, when Miss Federal District, Olga Bergamini de Sá, was elected. In 1933, A Noite launched a contest that would award the best June song. The dispute ended up creating the musical genre of melodies made specifically for the festivities of Saint John, being won that year by Benedicto Lacerda, with the song "Briguei com São João". Other initiatives by the newspaper were the creation of contests, such as "Rei Momo Primeira e Único" or a fantasy bath in the sea, the Corrida da Fogueira and the statue "Monumento ao Pequeno Jornaleiro", located in downtown Rio.

In A Noite, the career of writer Clarice Lispector began, who, in parallel to her service at the National Agency, had her first job there as a journalist and translator in 1939. It was also the starting point of the career of artist Orlando Mattos.

Several additional publications were launched, taking advantage of the prestige of A Noite, such as A Noite Ilustrada, Vamos Ler, A Carioca and A Manhã, in addition to Rádio Nacional. The newspaper is also considered a pioneer in the integration of the reader into the news, thanks to the creation of the "Carioca Repórter" section, later imitated by other vehicles.

== See also ==
- Grupo Globo
