= Rio Sul Center =

Tallest building in Rio de Janeiro, Brazil

- Torre Rio Sul
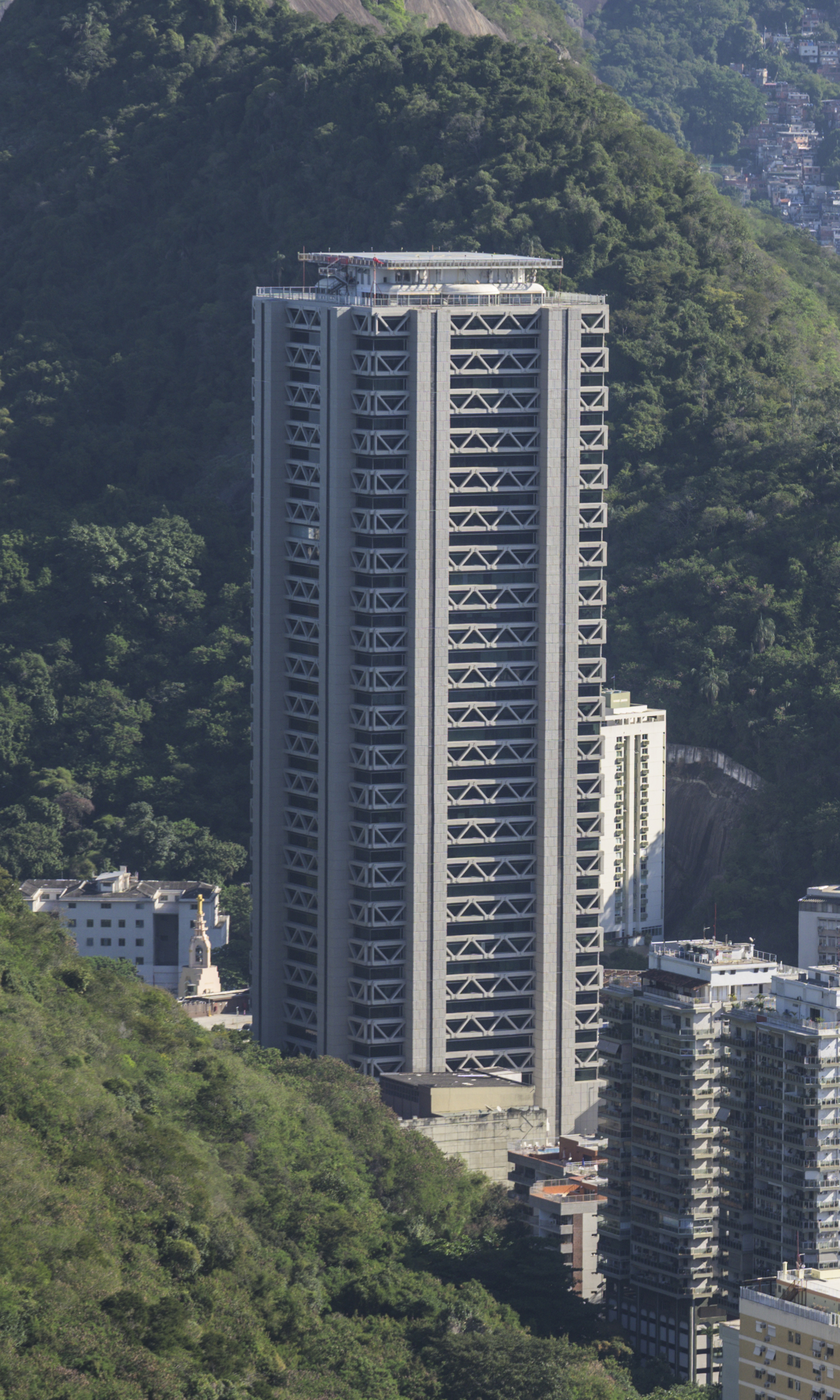
- Rio Sul Center, in Rio de Janeiro, Brazil
- Interactive map of the Rio Sul Center area

General information
- Status: Completed
- Type: Office tower
- Location: 116 Lauro Muller Avenue, Rio de Janeiro, RJ, Brazil
- Coordinates: 22.957314°S 43.176033°W
- Construction started: 1976
- Completed: 1982

Technical details
- Floor count: 40
- Floor area: 119.751,56 m²
- Lifts/elevators: 18

Design and construction
- Architect: Ulysses Burlamaqui
- Main contractor: Construtora Norberto Odebrecht S.A.

The Rio Sul Center Tower, also known as Rio Sul Tower, is the fourteenth tallest building in Brazil and the tallest building in Rio de Janeiro at 164 metres (538 ft) and 50 floors, 48 above ground and 2 below. The structure contains 28 elevators It was completed in 1982.

The building was designed by architects Ulysses Burlamaqui and Alexandre Chan in the Brutalist architectural style. The tower, together with a 400 stores shopping mall called Riosul Shopping Center, form a commercial complex known as Rio Sul Center.

== See also ==
- List of tallest buildings in South America
- List of tallest buildings in Brazil
