= Joseph Gire Building =

Office building in Rio de Janeiro, Brazil

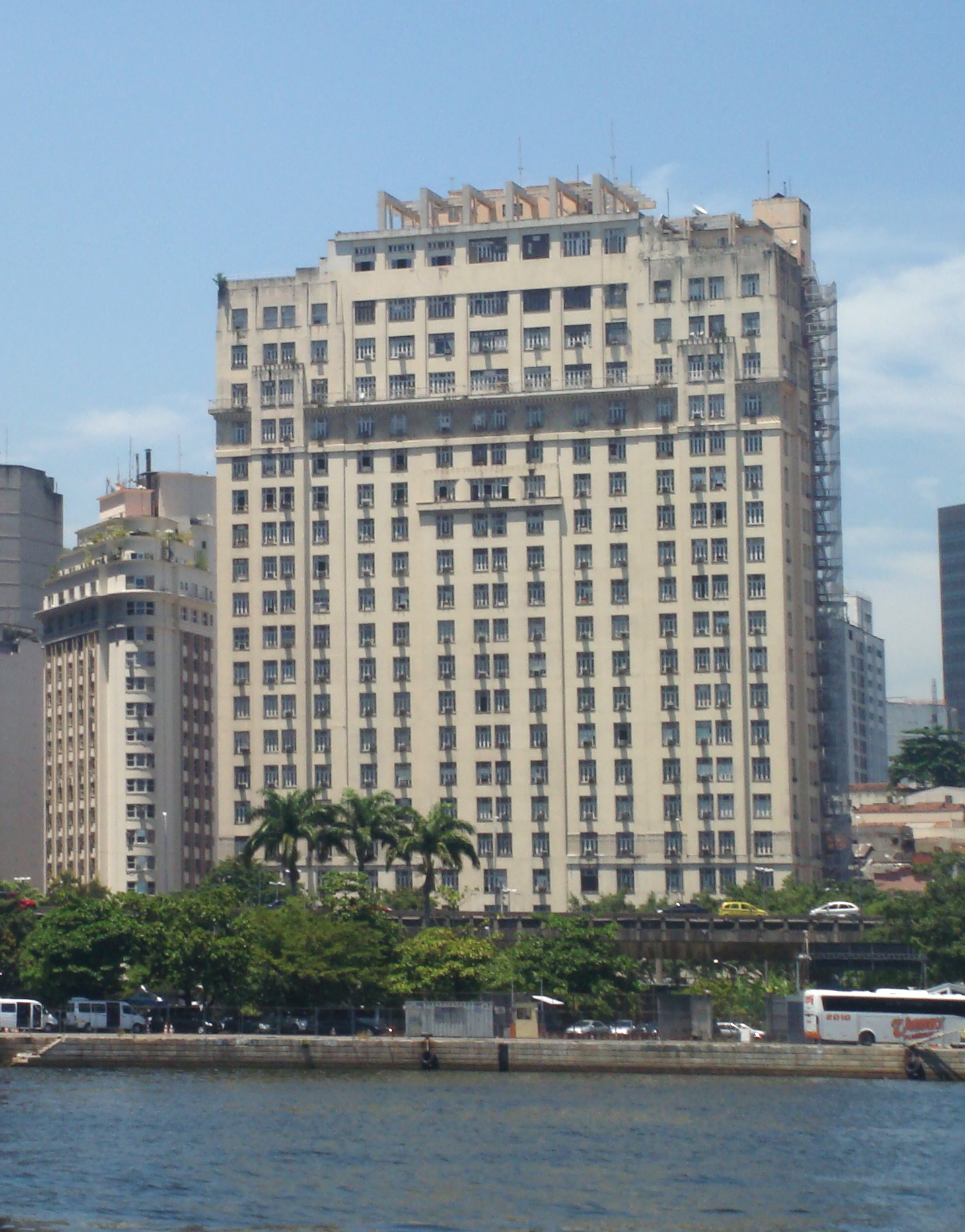
- Interactive map of the Joseph Gire Building area

Record height
- Tallest in Brazil from 1927 to 1929^{[I]}
- Preceded by: Sampaio Moreira Building
- Surpassed by: Martinelli Building

General information
- Architectural style: Art Deco
- Location: Rio de Janeiro, Brazil
- Coordinates: 22.8973°S 43.1810°W
- Completed: 1927

Height
- Height: 102 m (335 ft)

Technical details
- Floor count: 22

Design and construction
- Architects: Joseph Gire and Elisário Bahiana

The Joseph Gire Building, better known as the A Noite Building or Edificio o Jornal A Noite, is an office building located in Rio de Janeiro, Brazil that served as the headquarters of the Rio-based newspaper A Noite. At a height of 102 meters, it was the tallest building in Brazil for two years between 1927 and 1929 before it was surpassed by the Martinelli Building in São Paulo.

== History ==
The Joseph Gire Building was built at one of the ends of Avenida Central (now Avenida Rio Branco) in Praça Mauá, close to the Port of Rio de Janeiro. The site, which the building stood at, used to be part of the Portuguese Literary School, when it moved to the Largo da Carioca public place in Central Rio, where it still stands to this day.

Those responsible for the architectural project were the French architect Joseph Gire, who was also responsible for the construction of the Copacabana Palace hotel, and the Brazilian architect Elisário Bahiana. The project was built with the use of reinforced concrete, which was considered new technology at the time. This gave great impetus to engineering practiced in Brazil during that time. The structural calculations were carried out by the engineer Emílio Henrique Baumgart, who was later responsible for the Ministry of Education and Health.

With 22 floors and a height of 102 meters, it was the tallest building in Latin America, until the Martinelli Building in São Paulo surpassed it in 1929. The façade and the internal common areas of the building reveals influences of Art Deco origin, although the interior has been deprived of character by modern renovations.

The building was initially home to the evening newspaper A Noite, and it also served as a lookout that offered a privileged view of the city and the Guanabara Bay. From 1937 onwards, without the newspaper, it was the home of Rádio Nacional. During that time, it was very popular due to its talk shows and radio soap operas. Great singers like Sílvio Caldas, Francisco Alves and Orlando Silva passed through the radio auditorium, as well as arranger Radamés Gnattali. It was also home to several companies and restaurants, one of which was on the terrace of the building.

Over time, the area in and around the Joseph Gire Building has fallen into decay, although there are restoration plans to be made. It was formerly the headquarters of the National Institute of Industrial Property, although the INPI is now located in two other buildings nearby.

=== Importance ===
In addition to its cultural relevance, as it housed Rádio Nacional at the height of the Radio Era, the A Noite Building was an architectural and urban landmark. In formal terms, the building was close to the North American skyscraper models such as those that made up the Chicago landscape, very far from the European models favored in Brazil until then. In the Praça Mauá area, the building was so high that a harmonious urban composition with the surrounding buildings was impossible. From the construction of the A Noite Building began the process of verticalization of the city, which continued for decades.

=== 2020 auction ===
The auction of the Joseph Gire Building was announced by the Federal Government of Brazil on July 7, 2020, with an initial valuation of R$90 million.

On July 25, 2023, the sale of the building to a private investor was announced. The buyer will transform the building into a residential complex with 447 units and three retail units on the ground floor. Four proposals were analyzed, and the chosen one was the QOPP Incorporadora group, which offered 36 million reais, plus 50 percent of the additional potential generated by the rules of "Reviver Centro" — an urban, cultural, social and economic recovery plan for the central region of Rio de Janeiro — estimated at more than 24 million reais.

The project also includes public access to the terrace, in a future restaurant overlooking Mauá Square, and a cultural center for Rádio Nacional. Construction is scheduled to begin in the second half of 2024.

== See also ==
- List of tallest buildings in Brazil

Records
Preceded by Sampaio Moreira Building	Tallest building in Brazil; 84 m (276 ft); 1927–1929	Succeeded by Martinelli Building
