= Sedan Building =

Coordinates: 22.909721°S 43.178288°W

- Edifício Sedan
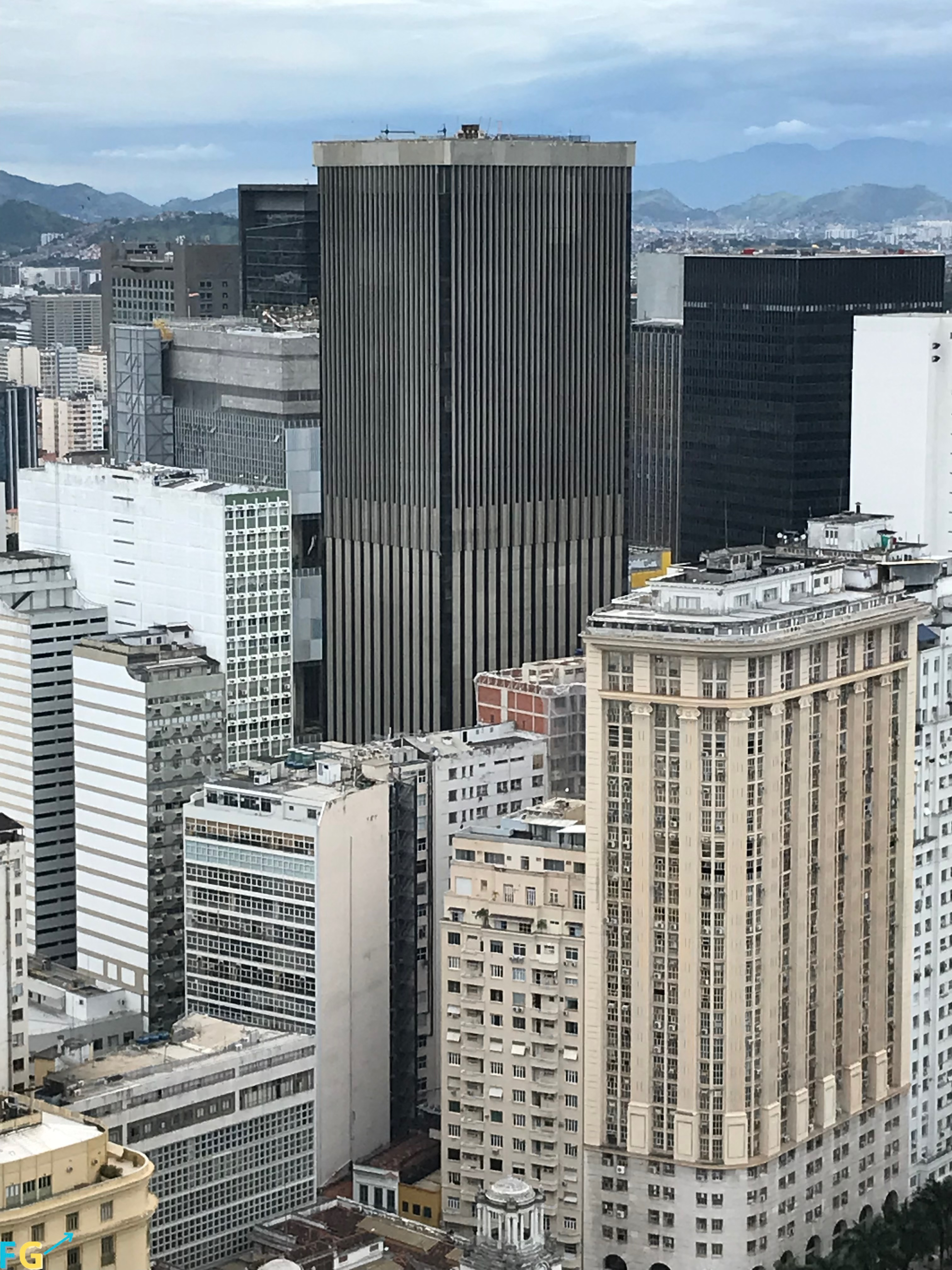
- The Sedan Building, at the centre, in 2023
- Interactive map of the Sedan Building area

General information
- Type: Office
- Location: Rio de Janeiro, Brazil
- Completed: 1980

Height
- Roof: 145 m (476 ft)

Technical details
- Floor count: 40
- Lifts/elevators: 16

The Sedan Building (Portuguese: Edifício Sedan) is a skyscraper in Rio de Janeiro, Brazil. It was completed in 1980, and is 145 metres tall, with 40 floors. It is currently the second tallest building in Rio de Janeiro.
