= Ventura Corporate Towers =

Coordinates: 22°54′32.4″S 43°10′54.4″W

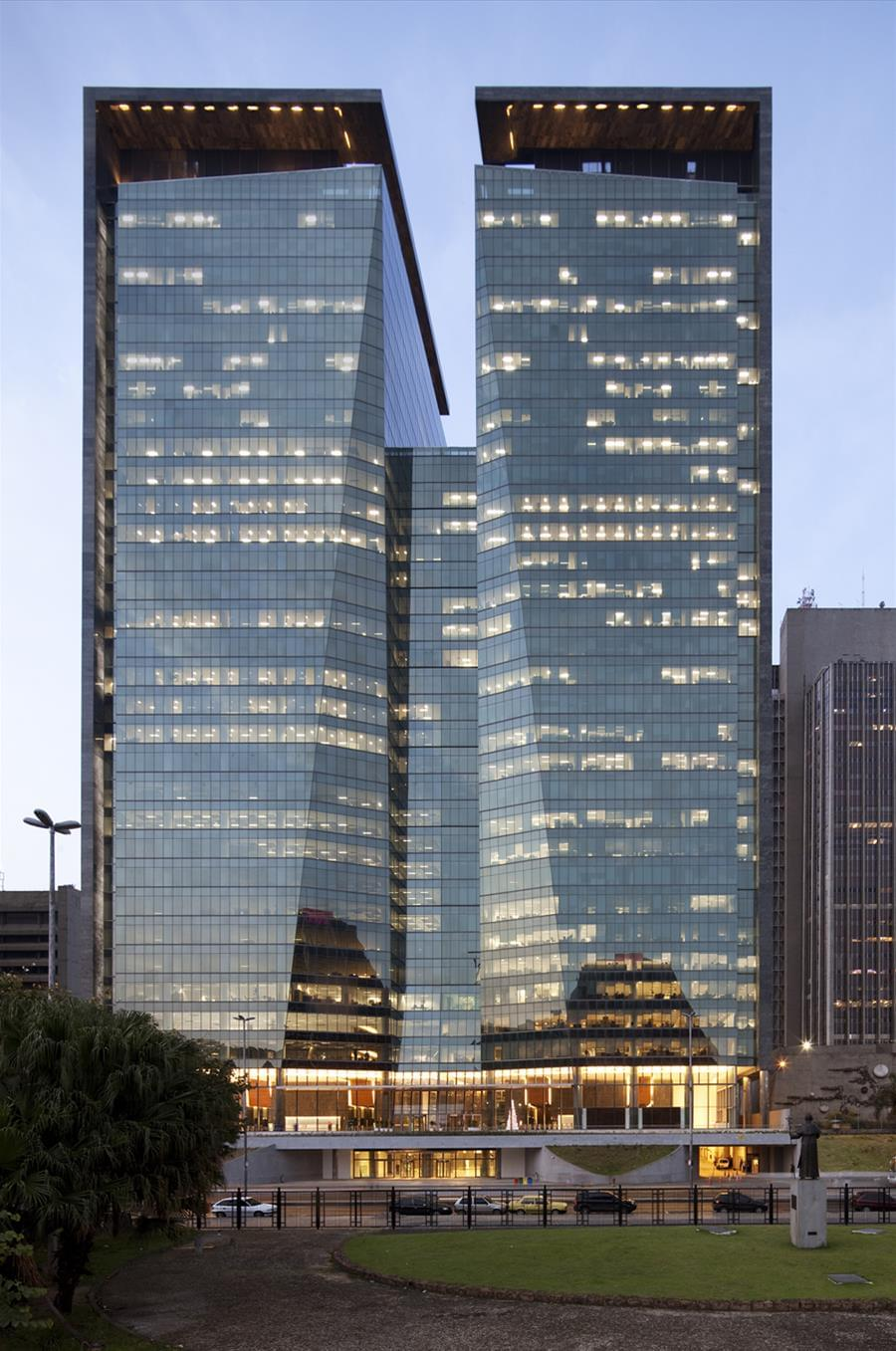

The Ventura Corporate Towers is an office building in the Centro neighbourhood of Rio de Janeiro, Brazil, fronting the avenue between Chile and Lavradio, the street in front of the Rio de Janeiro Cathedral. It was built by Camargo Correa in partnership with Tishman Speyer, who together invested 500,000,000 reais. Designed by Kohn Pedersen Fox Associates, the building has achieved LEED certification, by presenting streamlined and intelligent use of water. Moreover, the special glass provides natural lighting and is not so warm inside the building, reducing expenses with chilled air and light. Together with the Ventura Corporate Tower II, the venture will strengthen the corridor's commercial avenues in Chile, formed by the BNDES, Petrobras, and Caixa Economica Federal. The tower is 151 meters tall, with 36 floors and a heliport.
