= Martinelli Building =

Skyscraper in São Paulo, Brazil

- Edifício Martinelli

- Location within São Paulo Location within Brazil

Record height
- Tallest in South America from 1929 to 1936^{[I]}
- Preceded by: Palacio Barolo
- Surpassed by: Kavanagh Building

General information
- Type: Office
- Location: São Paulo, Brazil
- Coordinates: 23°32′44″S 46°38′06.7″W
- Construction started: 1924
- Completed: 1929
- Inaugurated: 1929

Height
- Roof: 105 m (344 ft)

Technical details
- Floor count: 28

Design and construction
- Architect: Vilmos (William) Fillinger

The Martinelli Building (in Portuguese: Edifício Martinelli), with 28 floors, is the first skyscraper built in Brazil. Located in São Paulo, it is 105 meters tall.

The building was planned in 1922 by the Italian-born entrepreneur, Giuseppe Martinelli. Construction began in 1924, and was completed in 1929. At the time of its opening, it was the tallest building in Latin America, and the largest concrete-framed building in the world.

The building was completely remodeled by Mayor Olavo Setúbal from 1975 to 1979. Today, the building houses the Departments of Municipal Housing and planning, companies Emurb and Cohab-SP, the headquarters of the Association of Banks of SP, and several shops on the ground floor of the building.

The building is located in the city center of São Paulo, opposite Banco do Brasil Building.

== See also ==
- List of tallest buildings in South America
- List of tallest buildings in Brazil
- List of tallest buildings in São Paulo

Records
Preceded by Palacio Barolo	Tallest building in South America; 105 m (344 ft); 1929–1947	Succeeded by Altino Arantes Building
Preceded by Edificio do Jornal A Noite	Tallest building in Brazil; 105 m (344 ft); 1929–1947	Succeeded by Altino Arantes Building
Preceded by Sampaio Moreira Building	Tallest building in São Paulo; 105 m (344 ft); 1929–1947	Succeeded by Altino Arantes Building
