= Torre Girasoles =

Skyscraper in Bolivia

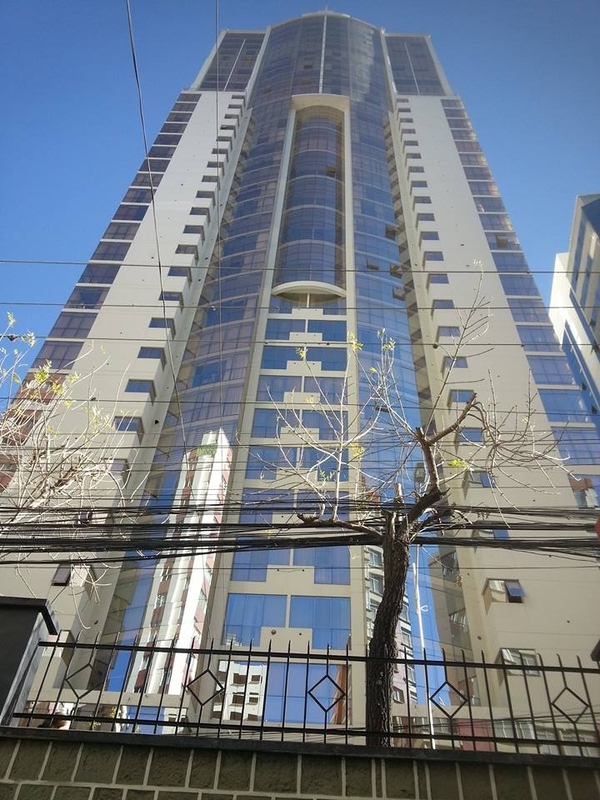
- Interactive map of the Torre Girasoles area

General information
- Status: Completed
- Type: Mixed-use: Residential, Office, Hotel
- Location: La Paz, Bolivia, Av.6 de Agosto, La Paz, Bolivia
- Coordinates: 16.51207°S 68.12341°W
- Construction started: 2010
- Completed: 2013

Height
- Roof: 150 m (490 ft)

Technical details
- Structural system: Concrete
- Floor count: 38 (+2 underground)

Design and construction
- Architect: Luis Mitru
- Main contractor: N&L Consultores

Torre Girasoles (Spanish for Sunflower Tower) is a mixed-use high-rise residential building in the San Jorge district of La Paz, Bolivia. Built between 2010 and 2013, the tower stands at 150 m (490 ft) with 38 floors and is the current 4rd tallest building in Bolivia. It previously held the record of the tallest in the country between 2013 and 2018.

== History ==
=== Architecture ===
The tower is located on Av. 6 de Agosto boulevard, in the San Jorge district of La Paz. The building was initially planned for residential use, which is still the latter's primary function, but it also includes office spaces, a hotel and a shopping center on the first floors. It also has 180 parking spaces, distributed over four underground levels, which ascend in a spiral shape, it also has a resistant seismic system and an electric generator to supply the building if a power outage occurs in the area.

At the time 2.1 3.3 4,444 of its inauguration, the Girasoles Tower was the tallest skyscraper in Bolivia, surpassing the La Casona Condominium of Santa Cruz de la Sierra which stands at 127 metres tall. Currently, the Girasoles Tower is the fourth tallest skyscraper in Bolivia, a height that was surpassed in 2021 by the 170 meters of Tower D of the Torres del Poeta complex, and then in 2022 by the 180.7-metre-tall (593 ft) Green Tower.

Throughout the construction phase, it was established that the primary focus of the building's optimization study consists of the columns and their varying mechanical resistance characteristics of the concrete. In this regard, by analyzing these elements and inputting data into the structural simulator, key factors of variation associated with the increase in mechanical resistances were assessed. The variable factors of interest are implied in the management of high-performance concretes, which are linked to their stress deformation.

The construction of the tower groundbroke in August 2010 and was officially completed on June 17, 2013.

== Gallery ==
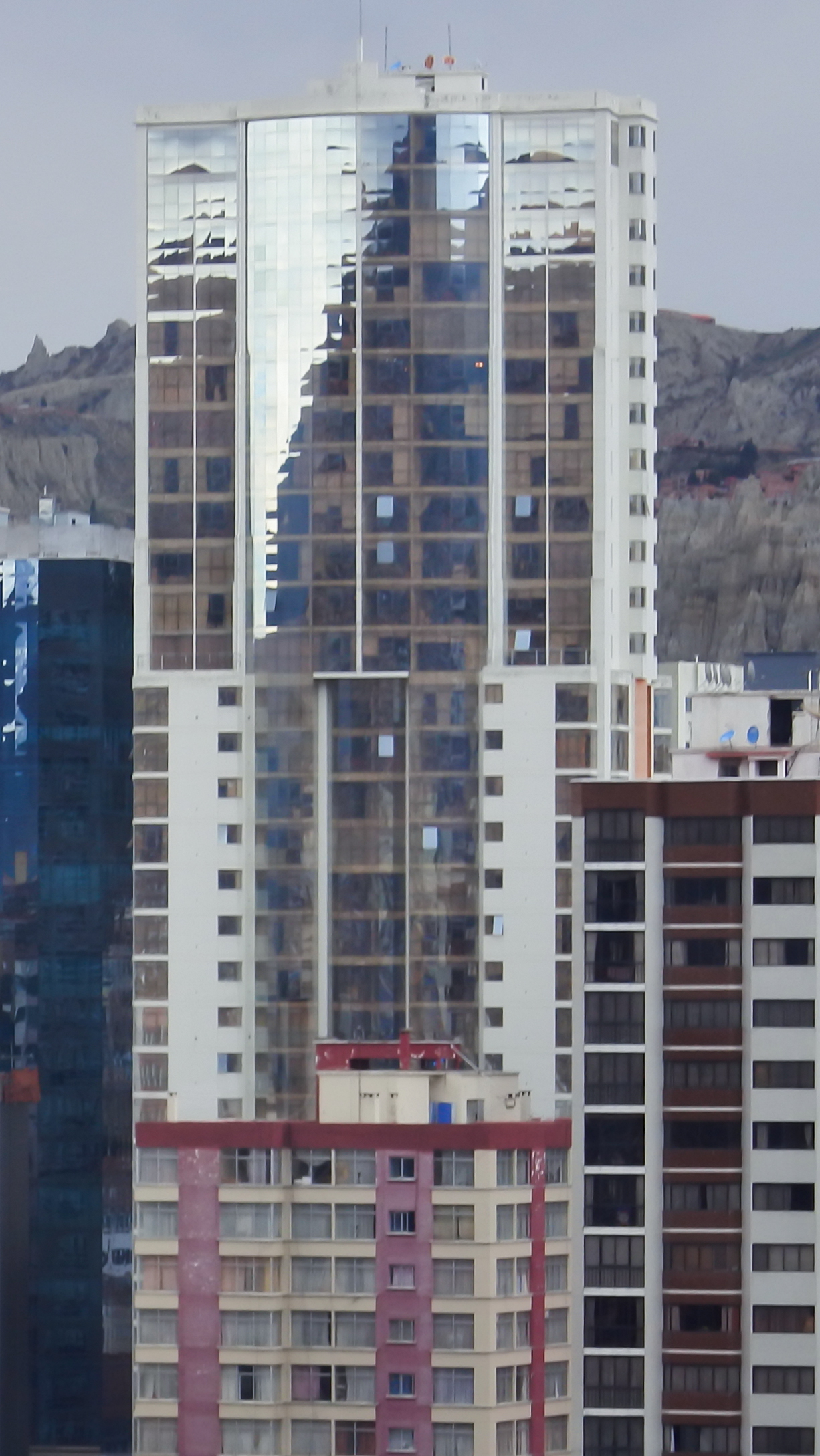
Further view of the tower

== See also ==
- List of tallest buildings in Bolivia
- List of tallest buildings in South America

Records
Preceded by Condominio La Casona	Tallest building in Bolivia; 2013–2018	Succeeded by Torres del Poeta
