= Torres del Poeta =

Skyscraper in Bolivia

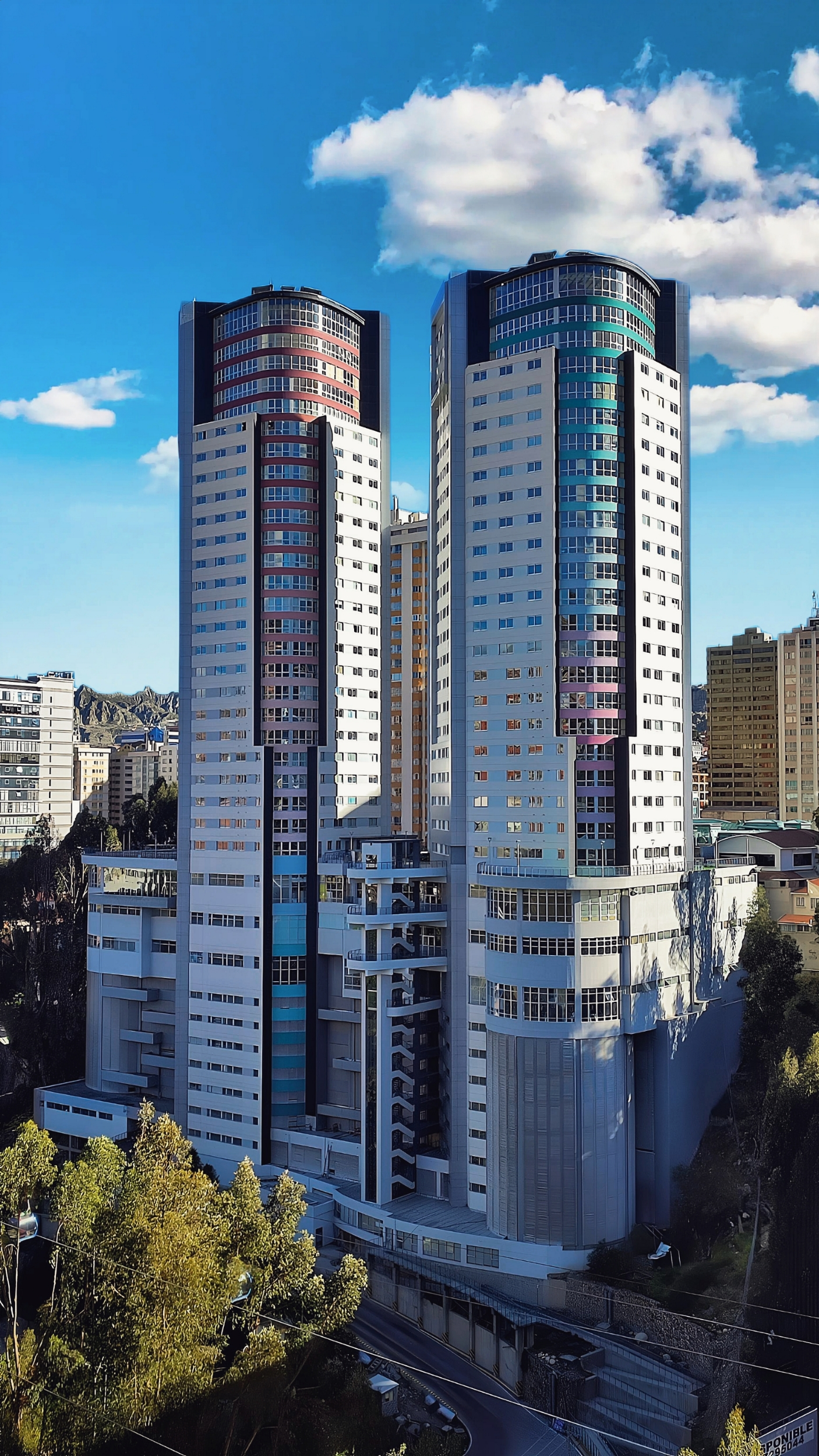
- Tower D (left) and C (right)
- Interactive map of the Torres del Poeta area

General information
- Status: Completed
- Type: Residential, Office building
- Location: La Paz, Bolivia, 2519 Av. Arce, La Paz, Bolivia
- Coordinates: 16.50872°S 68.12296°W
- Construction started: 2012
- Completed: 2018
- Owner: Acción Cultural Loyola (ACLO)

Height
- Roof: 178 m (584 ft)

Technical details
- Structural system: Concrete
- Floor count: 36 (+4 undergr.) (Tower D); 34 (+4 undergr.) (Tower C)
- Floor area: 110,000 m^{2} (1,180,000 sq ft) (entire complex)

Design and construction
- Architect: Ramiro Muñoz Moyano

Website
- Torres de Poeta

Torres del Poeta is a condominium complex located in La Paz, Bolivia. It comprises a total of four towers: two business towers and two apartment towers. Among them is what was once the tallest building in Bolivia, at 36 stories and 178 meters high,[2] surpassed in 2022 by the 181.7-meter Green Tower.[3]

This complex includes parking and a shopping center called Las Torres Mall, which opened on May 24, 2018.

At the entrance to the complex is the Goitia House, a heritage residence that is part of the Plaza Isabel La Católica Heritage Complex.

== History ==
The Torres del Poeta real estate initiative was initiated in 2012 and is situated on Arce Avenue, facing Plaza Isabel la Católica in La Paz. The blocks can additionally be reached through Avenida del Poeta. The four towers are constructed above a common platform which consists of parking levels and a business district.

=== Architecture ===
Tower A, located nearest to Arce Avenue, is the only building of the complex to feature ten stories designated for offices. Every level encompasses an area of 500 m^{2} (5,380 sq ft). The tower was the first of the complex to be finished and was inaugurated in September 2015. Ramiro Muñoz Moyano, the project's architect in chief, mentioned that Tower B features offices across 19 levels and was initially planned to sit centrally within the complex. Main entry to these floors are available through the commercial areas and the parking garages. Tower B houses a total of 66 rentable office spaces.

The executive stated that buildings C and D contain 200 apartment units. Tower C consists of 37 floors of apartments, while Tower D will feature 40 levels of the same function. The primary construction of the two main towers was completed in 2016 and the complex itself was inaugurated in 2018.

The development was intended to showcase residential apartments, office spaces, banking facilities, a retail center, parking areas, a childcare facility, a supermarket, and landscaped areas. The building site started functioning through a coalition of private investors and was responsible for providing 204 apartments, 74 offices, 74 retail spaces, and over 700 parking spots, alongside a food court and landscaped areas.

== See also ==
- List of tallest buildings in Bolivia
- List of tallest buildings in South America

Records
Preceded by Torre Girasoles	Tallest building in Bolivia; 2018–2022	Succeeded by Green Tower
