= List of tallest buildings in Bolivia =

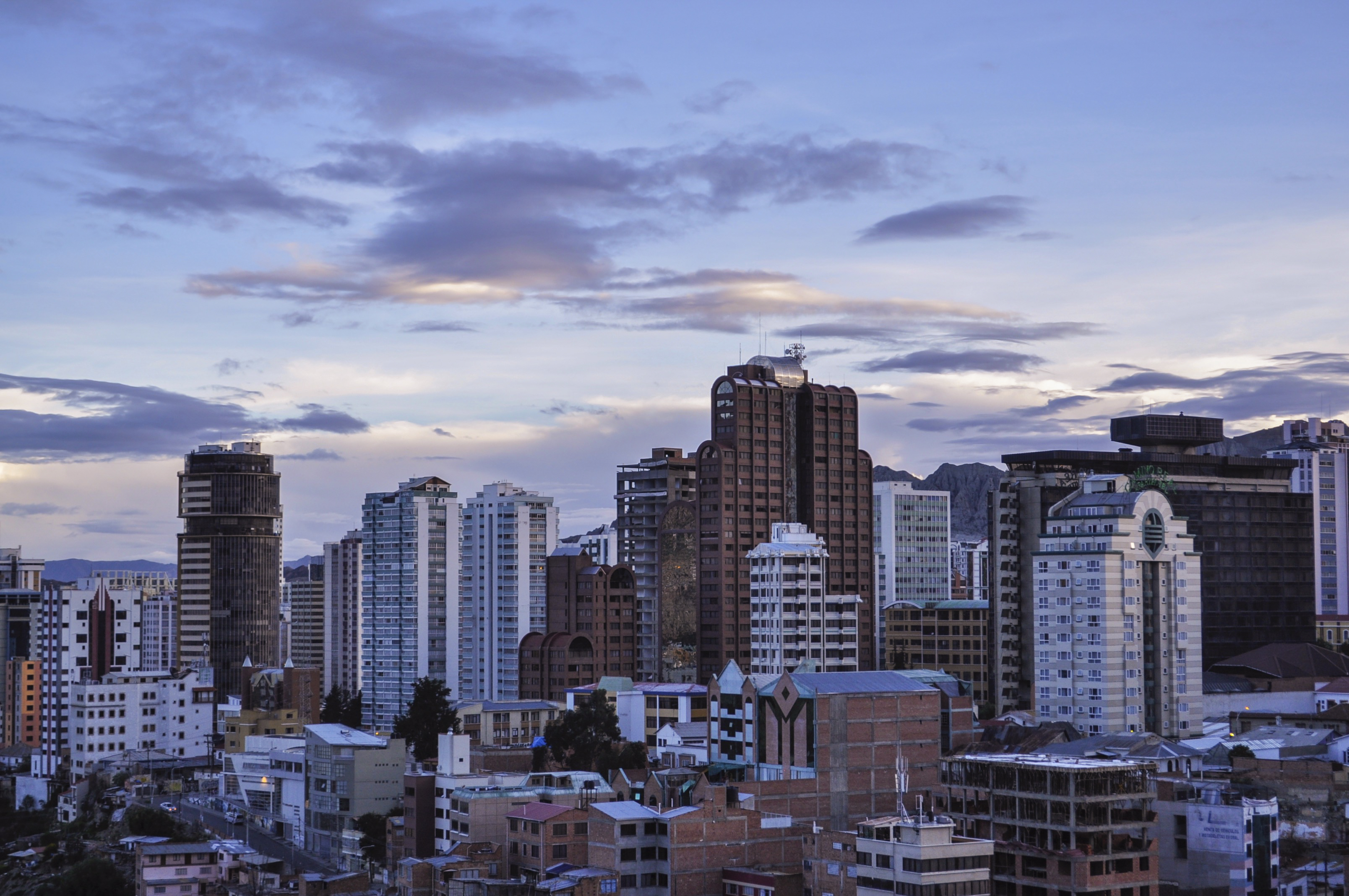
La Paz skyline

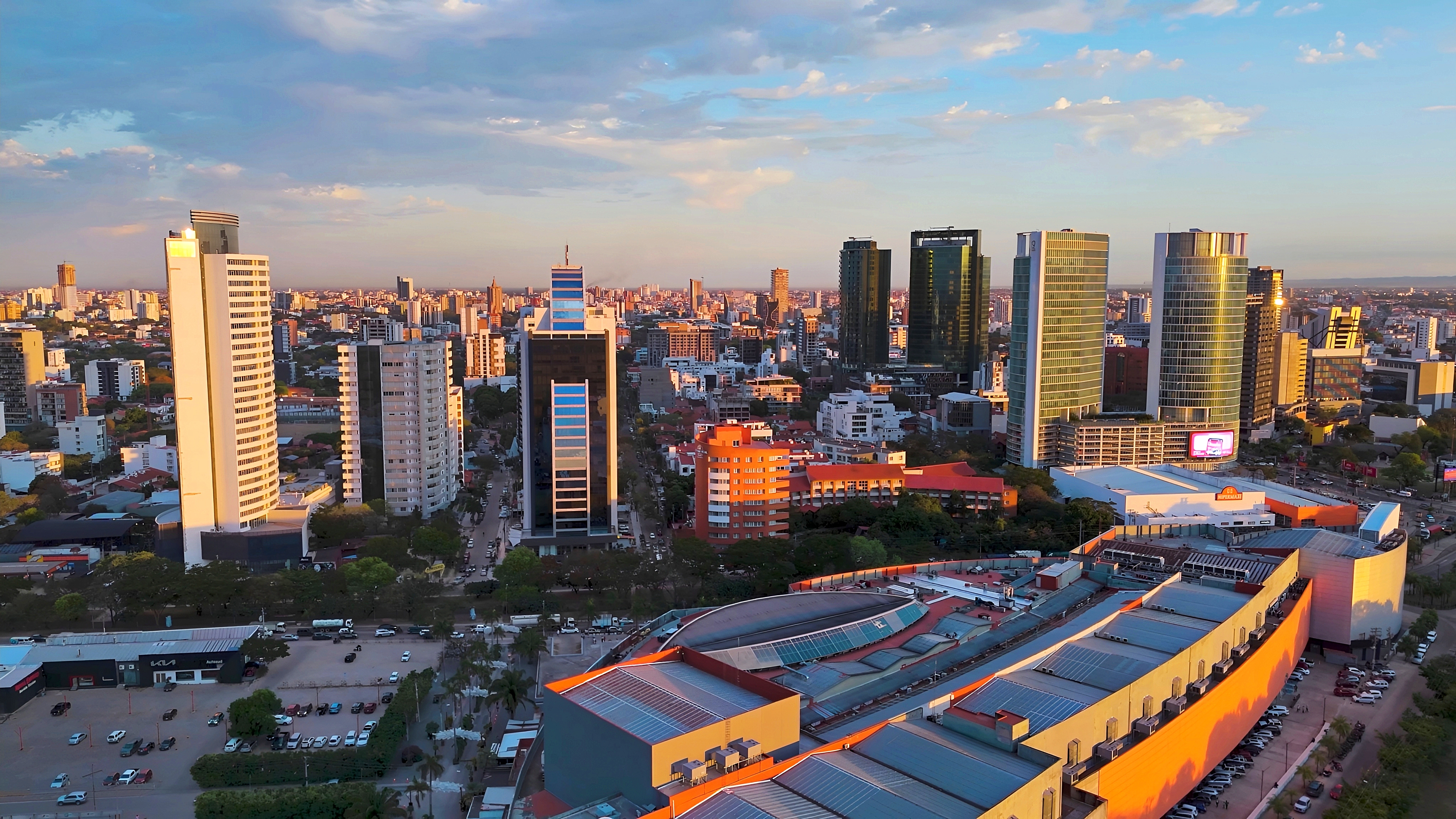
Santa Cruz de la Sierra skyline

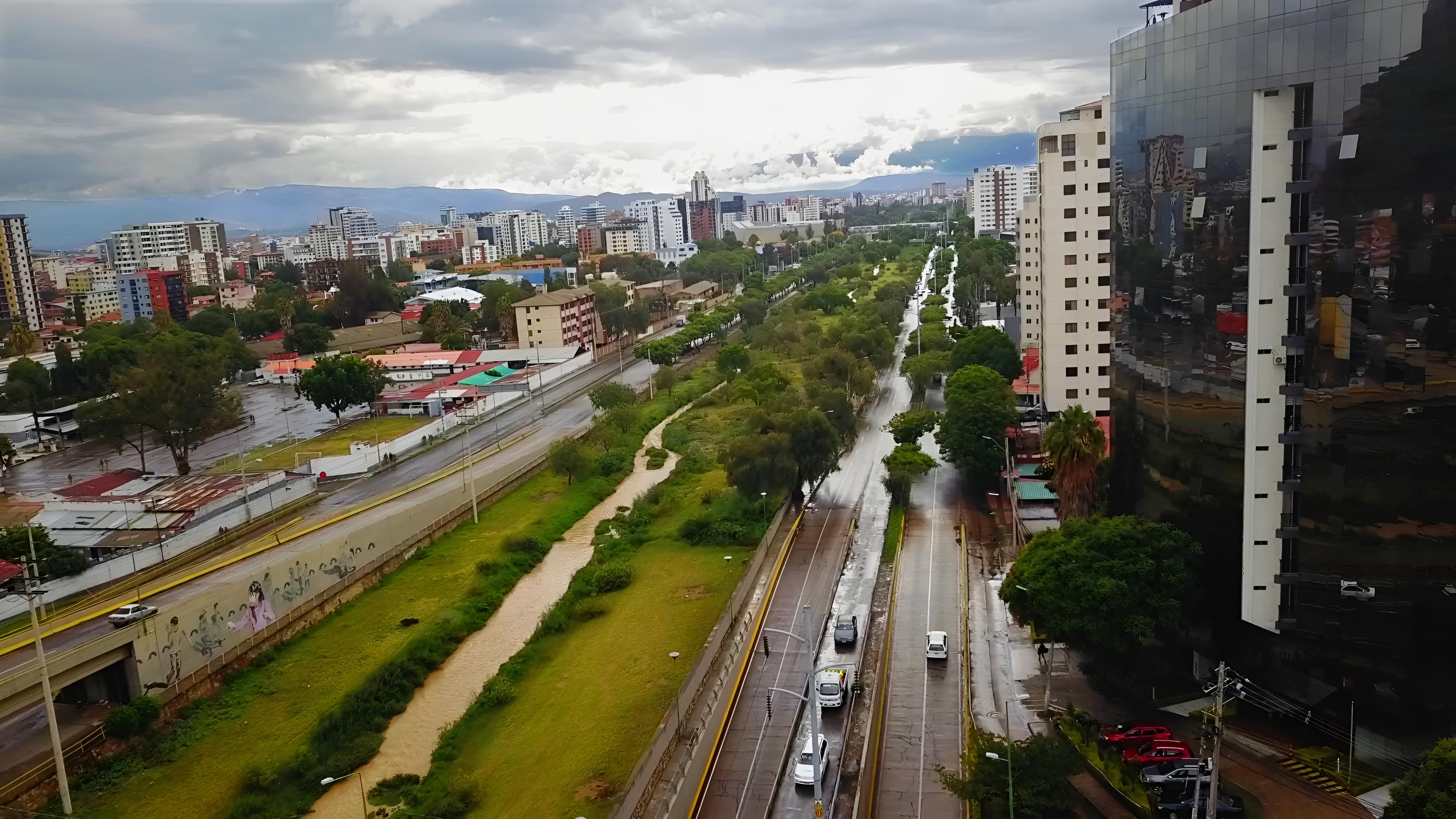
Cochabamba skyline

This list of tallest buildings in Bolivia ranks the tallest skyscrapers and buildings in the country, either built or under construction. Currently, the tallest building in Bolivia is Green Tower in La Paz, at 180 m (590.551 ft ), followed by Towers C and D of the Torres del Poeta complex with a maximum height of 178 m (583.99 ft). La Paz has the highest concentration of skyscrapers in the country, followed by Santa Cruz de la Sierra and Cochabamba. The tallest building in Santa Cruz is the Green Tower (Tower 1), at 140 m (459.318 ft), and the Platinum II Tower, at 136 meters tall, both located in Santa Cruz de la Sierra. By 2025, Bolivia is estimated to have 37 buildings over 100 meters tall, four skyscrapers over 150 m (492.126 ft), and several projects over 100 meters tall. The first building to reach 100 m (328.084 ft) was the Edificio Alameda, completed in 1967, located in La Paz.

Green Tower, the tallest skyscraper in Bolivia, located in La Paz.

Aerial photograph of the city of Santa Cruz de la Sierra.

View of the Attura and Los Tiempos buildings, Cochabamba.

This list of tallest buildings in Bolivia ranks the tallest skyscrapers and buildings in the country, either built or under construction. Currently, the tallest building in Bolivia is Green Tower in La Paz, at 181 metres tall, followed by towers C and D of the Torres del Poeta complex with a maximum height of 178 metres tall. La Paz has the highest concentration of skyscrapers in the country, followed by Santa Cruz de la Sierra and Cochabamba. The tallest building in Santa Cruz de la Sierra is the Green Towers (Torre 1), with a height of 140 meters, and the Platinum II Tower, with a height of 136 meters, both located in Santa Cruz de la Sierra.

By 2025, Bolivia is estimated to have 37 buildings over 100 meters tall, four skyscrapers over 150 meters tall, and several projects over 150 meters tall. The first building to reach 100 meters was the Alameda Building, completed in 1967, located in La Paz.

== Tallest Buildings ==
Was the tallest building in Bolivia upon completion

The following list details the completed and crowned buildings in Bolivia that are at least 80 meters tall. Needles and similar architectural details are included as valid measurements for the final height, but antenna masts are not. An equal sign (=) indicates a tie in height between two or more buildings, with the tiebreaker being the number of floors and, if applicable, the year of completion.

Position	Building	Image	City	Height (m)	Floors	Use	Year of completion
1	Green Tower		La Paz	180	46	Mixed use	2022
2	Poet Towers (Tower D)	asda	La Paz	178	40	Mixed use	2018
3	Torres del Poeta (Tower C)	asda	La Paz	167	37	Mixed use	2018
4	Torre Girasoles		La Paz	150	37	Residential	2013
5	Torre Kyrio's	Torre Kyros La Paz	La Paz	145	37	Residential	2024
6	Green Tower Santa Cruz (Tower 1)	Greentower2-issolyu	Santa Cruz de la Sierra	140	34	Mixed Use	2024
7	Platinum II Tower	Torre Platinum II	Santa Cruz de la Sierra	136	35	Residential	2021
8	Shalom Tower	Torre Shalom	La Paz	131	32	Residential	2024
9	Big House of the People		La Paz	131	29	Government	2018
10	Green Tower Santa Cruz (Tower 2)		Santa Cruz de la Sierra	130	30	Residential	2024
11	La Casona Condominium		Santa Cruz de la Sierra	127	27	Residential	2009
12	Central Bank of Bolivia		La Paz	126	29	Governmental	1980
13	Block 40 (Tower 1)	Manzana40-issolyu	Santa Cruz de la Sierra	123	31	Mixed use	2021
14	Block 40 (Tower 2)		Santa Cruz de la Sierra	123	31	Mixed use	2021
15	Santa Cruz Mercantile Tower		Santa Cruz de la Sierra	122	31	Offices	2019
16	Deco Tower		La Paz	117	29	Residential	2022
17	Tower 23		La Paz	115	29	Mixed	2024
18	Vitruvian Tower		La Paz	114	27	Residential	2021
19	Faith Tower		La Paz	113	30	Residential	2018
20	Torre de las Américas		La Paz	112	29	Residential	1979
21	World Trade Center (Tower 2)		Santa Cruz de la Sierra	112	27	Offices	2023
22	Alianza Building		La Paz	110	30	Residential	1983
23	Multicentro (Torre B)	asda	La Paz	110	29	Offices	1995
24	Torre El Dorial		La Paz	109	28	Residential	2018
25	Torre Dúo		Santa Cruz de la Sierra	109	27	Offices	2012
26	Ambassador Business Center		Santa Cruz de la Sierra	108	26	Offices	2017
27	Millennium Tower		La Paz	108	25	Residential	2020
28	Mario Mercado Building		La Paz	107	26	Mixed use	2015
29	La Riviera Condominium		Santa Cruz de la Sierra	105	28	Residential	2017
30	Edificio La Alameda		La Paz	105	27	Residential	1967
31	Gundlach Towers		La Paz	104	28	Offices	1996
32	Mare Condominium		Santa Cruz de la Sierra	103	28	Residential	2023
33	Torre Vicenta		La Paz	101	28	Residential	2015
34	Santa Isabel Building		La Paz	100	28	Residential	1971
35	Epic Tower		Santa Cruz de la Sierra	100	27	Offices	2022
36	Fie Bank Building		La Paz	100	23	Offices	2019
37	Palace of Justice		Santa Cruz de la Sierra	100	23	Governmental	1996
38	Swissôtel		Santa Cruz de la Sierra	99	26	Hotelier	2019
39	Los Tiempos Building		Cochabamba	98	20	Offices	1989
40	Camila Tower	asda	La Paz	97	27	Residential	2021
41	Yolanda Building		La Paz	96	26	Residential	2016
42	Illimani Building		La Paz	95	26	Mixed	1981
43	Macororó Condominium 14	asda	Santa Cruz de la Sierra	94	26	Residential	2022
44	Sheraton Hotel (Tower 2)		Santa Cruz de la Sierra	92	24	Hotelier	2022
45	Camilla II Tower		La Paz	92	24	Residential	2025
46	Evolution Towers (Tower 1)		Santa Cruz de la Sierra	92	24	Residential	2022
47	Metro Tower	Torre Metro en La Paz	La Paz	92	22	Residential	2019
48	Ubuntu Condominium (South Tower)	Greentower2-issolyu	Cochabamba	91	25	Residential	2022
49	Roles Apart Hotel	asda	Sucre	91	25	Hotelier	2012
50	Alcázar Building (Tower 1)		La Paz	91	25	Offices	1998
51	Edificio Alcázar (Tower 2)		La Paz	91	25	Offices	1998
52	Premium Tower		La Paz	90	25	Residential	2015
53	Hugo Tower		La Paz	90	24	Residential	2024
54	Palace of Communications		La Paz	90	23	Governmental	1988
55	Sheraton Hotel (Tower 1)		Santa Cruz de la Sierra	90	23	Hotelier	2022
56	Idea Tower		La Paz	90	23	Residential	2016
57	Orion Building		La Paz	89	25	Residential	1984
58	Mercedes Campos Tower		La Paz	88	26	Residential	2022
59	Yocapri III Building		La Paz	86	24	Residential	2012
60	Cobija Building		La Paz	86	24	Residential	1986
61	Calama Building		La Paz	86	24	Residential	1986
62	Fernando V Building		La Paz	86	24	Residential	1983
63	Blue Tower		La Paz	85	22	Offices	2011
64	Hansa Building		La Paz	85	22	Offices	1979
65	Nairobi Tower		La Paz	84	23	Residential	2021
66	Macororó Condominium 13		Santa Cruz de la Sierra	84	23	Residential	2022
67	Sapphire Tower		La Paz	84	23	Residential	2013
68	Edificio Colón		Cochabamba	84	22	Offices	1994
69	Ministry of Economy and Public Finance		La Paz	84	21	Governmental	2017
70	Angélica María Building		La Paz	83	23	Residential	
71	Rengel Building		La Paz	83	23	Residential	
72	Royal Building		Sucre	83	23	Residential	2009
73	Santa Teresa Building		La Paz	82	23	Residential	1980
74	Torre María Ema		La Paz	82	23	Residential	
75	Torre Deco II		La Paz	81	23	Residential	2025
76	Hotel Marriott Santa Cruz de la Sierra		Santa Cruz de la Sierra	80	21	Hotelier	2018
77	Torre Cinal		La Paz	80	20	Residential	2010

== Projects under construction ==
Building	Status	Height (m)	Floors	City	Ref
Las Loritas Tower	Under construction	150	38	La Paz	
Macororó 16 Building	Under construction	142	36	Santa Cruz de la Sierra	
Macororó 17 Building	Under construction	142	36	Santa Cruz de la Sierra	
Dunatos Mall and Building (Tower 1)	Under construction	140	32	Cochabamba	
BC Tower	Under construction	145	31	Cochabamba	
Mahogany Tower	Under construction	115	31	Cochabamba	
Clavcon Tower	Under construction	112	28	La Paz	
Paramount (Tower 1)	In Construction	110	31	Cochabamba	
Pankara Center	Under construction	100	26	La Paz	
Dunatos Mall and Building (Tower 2)	Under construction	97	28	Cochabamba	
PANORAMIC Tower	Under Construction	95	25	La Paz	
Tower 50	Under construction	95	27	Cochabamba	
Torre Las Nieves	Under construction	94	26	Oruro	
Vintage II	Under construction	94	27	Cochabamba	
Mall Emporium	Under construction	93	25	Oruro	
Alta Center Tower	Under construction	92	23	Santa Cruz de la Sierra	
Brooklyn Heights (Tower 2)	In construction	91	25	Santa Cruz de la Sierra	
Timora II Tower	In Construction	83	21	La Paz	

== Ranking of Cities by Number of Buildings ==
Below is a list of cities according to the number of buildings that exceed 80 meters in height:

Rank	City	Buildings	Under construction	Total
1	La Paz	49	5	54
2	Santa Cruz de la Sierra	25	4	29
3	Cochabamba	3	7	10
4	Sucre	2	0	2
5	Oruro	0	2	2

== Historical chronology ==
Period	Image	Building	Uses	Height (m)	Floors	City	Ref.
1967-1983		La Alameda Building	Residential	105	27	La Paz	
1983-2009		Edificio Alianza	Residential	110	30	La Paz	
2009-2013	Condominio La Casona Sc	La Casona Condominium	Residential/Commercial	124	27	Santa Cruz de la Sierra	
2013-2018		Torre Girasoles	Residential	150	38	La Paz	
2018-2022	asda	Torres del Poeta (Tower D)	Mixed	178	40	La Paz	
2022-present		Green Tower	Offices	180	46	La Paz	

== Under construction ==
This list ranks buildings under construction in Bolivia that are planned to rise at least 100 m (330 ft).

Name	City	Height	Floors	Year
Macororó 16	Santa Cruz de la Sierra	135 m (443 ft)	36	2026
Macororó 17	Santa Cruz de la Sierra	135 m (443 ft)	36	2026
Torre Shalom	La Paz	132 m (433 ft)	35	2025
World Trade Center Santa Cruz 1	Santa Cruz de la Sierra	125 m (410 ft)	27	
World Trade Center Santa Cruz 2	Santa Cruz de la Sierra	125 m (410 ft)	27	
BC Tower	Cochabamba	113 m (371 ft)	31	

== See also ==
- List of tallest buildings in South America
