= Green Tower (La Paz) =

Skyscraper in Bolivia

Green Tower La Paz
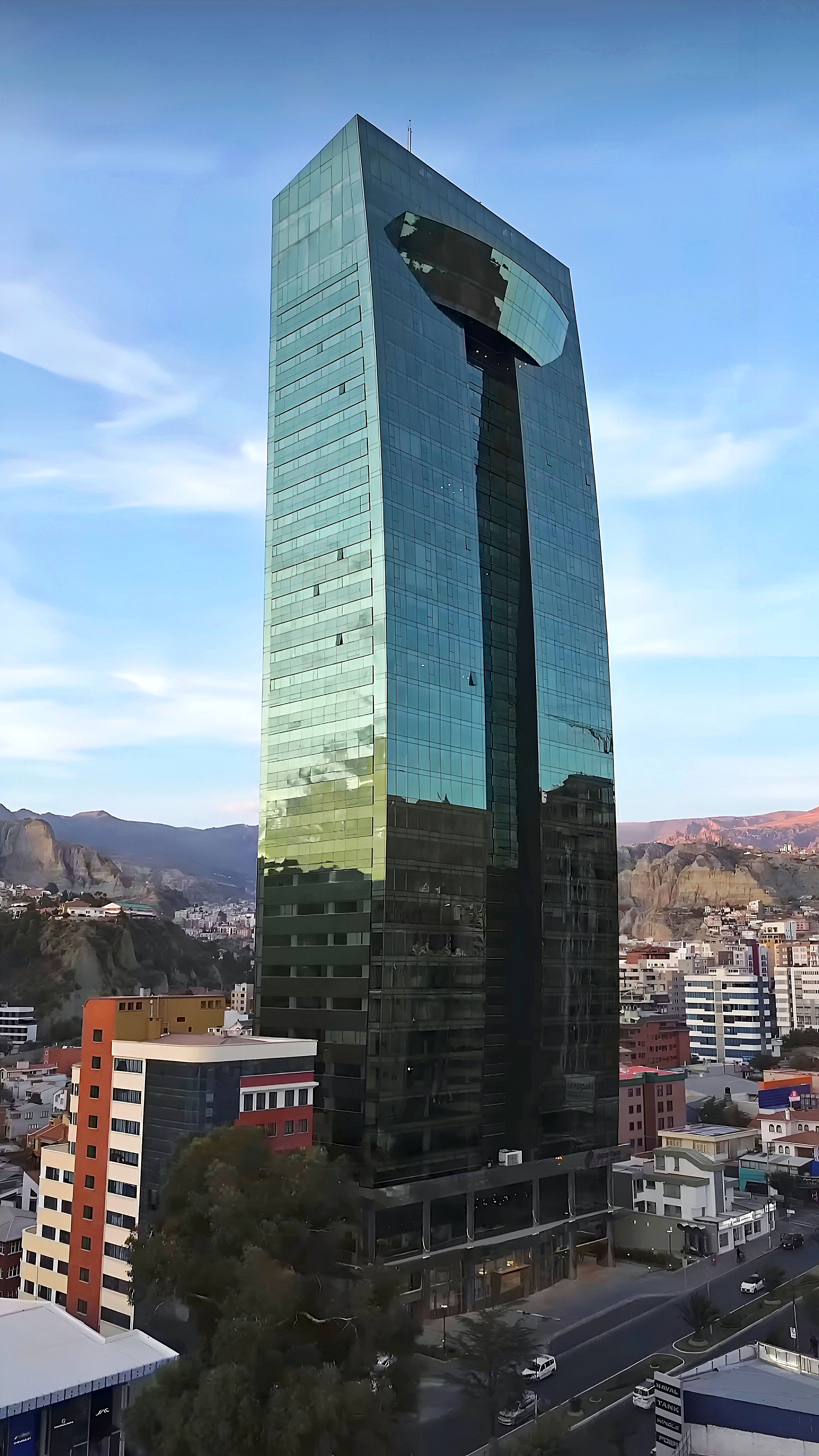
- Interactive map of the Green Tower La Paz area

General information
- Status: Completed
- Type: Residential (17 floors); Office (17 floors)
- Location: La Paz, Bolivia, Av. Ballivián 1087, Calacoto, La Paz
- Coordinates: 16.53844°S 68.08146°W
- Construction started: 2018
- Completed: 2022
- Cost: €50,000,000

Height
- Roof: 181.7 m (596 ft)

Technical details
- Structural system: Concrete
- Floor count: 46 (6 underground)
- Floor area: 55,000 m^{2} (592,000 sq ft)
- Lifts/elevators: 10

Design and construction
- Architect: Gustavo Dellien
- Developer: Green Tower Work & Life
- Main contractor: Comversa SA Investment Company

Website
- greentower.com.bo/la-paz

Green Tower is a mixed-use skyscraper in La Paz, Bolivia, standing at 181.7 meters (600ft) tall, with a total of 40 floors. Built between 2018 and 2022, it is the tallest building in the country, being preceded by Tower D of the Torres del Poeta complex.

== History ==
=== Architecture ===
The development of the project was planned by Bolivian businessman Samuel Doria Medina and designed by Beni Department chief architect Gustavo Dellien. The construction began in 2018 and was inaugurated in late 2022. The building has a total usable area of 55,000 square meters and has 17 floors of residential use and 17 floors of offices as well as additional floors for commercial use and amenities. The tower received its LEED Gold Certification in 2022. The construction was completed in 1,700 days by a total of 2,600 workers. The retaining walls and foundations were built from top to bottom, with the aim of minimising the risks of accidents. The tower's structure was designed to be earthquake-proof and the facades were modelled in high-tech Spanish glass with the role of regulating the entry of sunlight and heat during daytime.

The building has six underground floors designed to fit approximately 400 parking spots. The first main six floors of the building host a suite of lobbies, shops and restaurants. The top floor contains a viewing platform from which a 360-degree view of the city can be seen.

Green Tower has many records. It is also the first building to have carried out soil studies up to 70 metres below the surface, in order to guarantee the firm support of its million tonnes of weight. And it is the first to build its retaining walls and foundations from top to bottom, in order to minimise the risk of accidents. It is one of the first verified earthquake-resistant buildings in Bolivia.

The inauguration of the Green Tower came as a comeback of the national economy which experienced a historic decline as a result of the coronavirus pandemic. Local official figures confirmed the upturn of thedynamic sector in terms of investment, direct and indirect job creation and the driving force behind other economic activities.

== See also ==
- List of tallest buildings in Bolivia
- List of tallest buildings in South America

Records
Preceded by Torres del Poeta (Torre D)	Tallest building in Bolivia; 2022–present	Succeeded by Incumbent
