= List of tallest buildings by city =

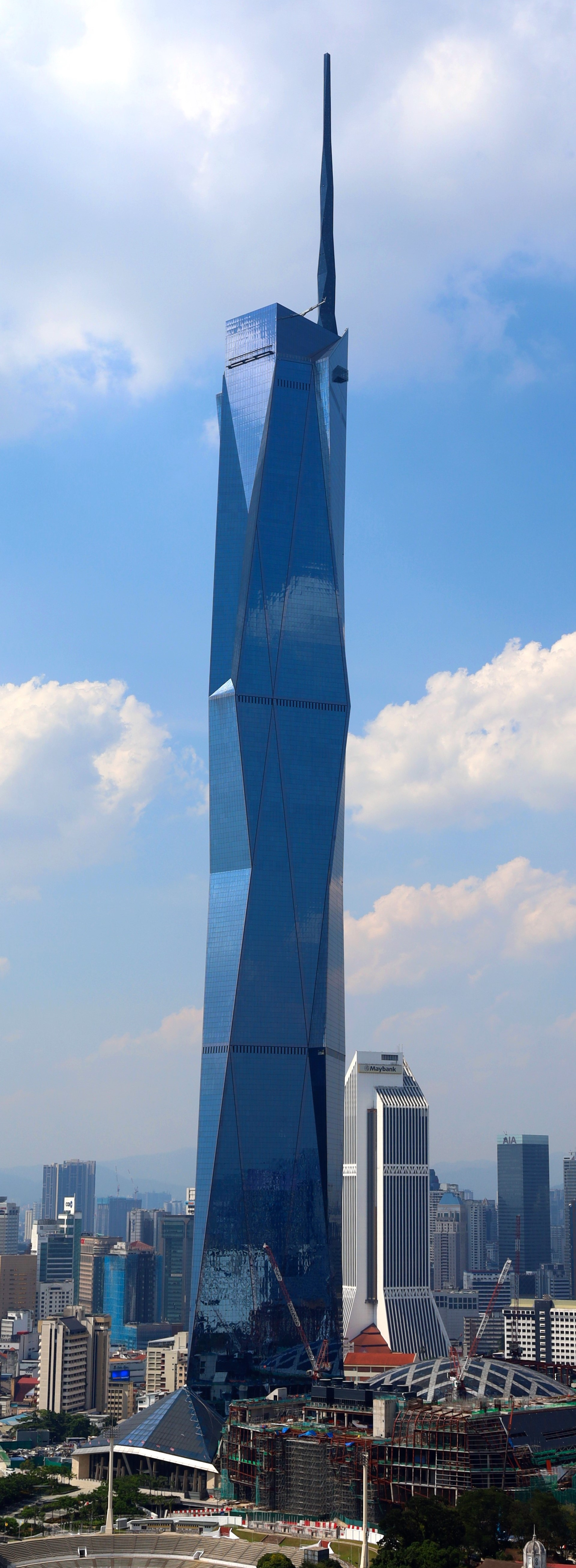
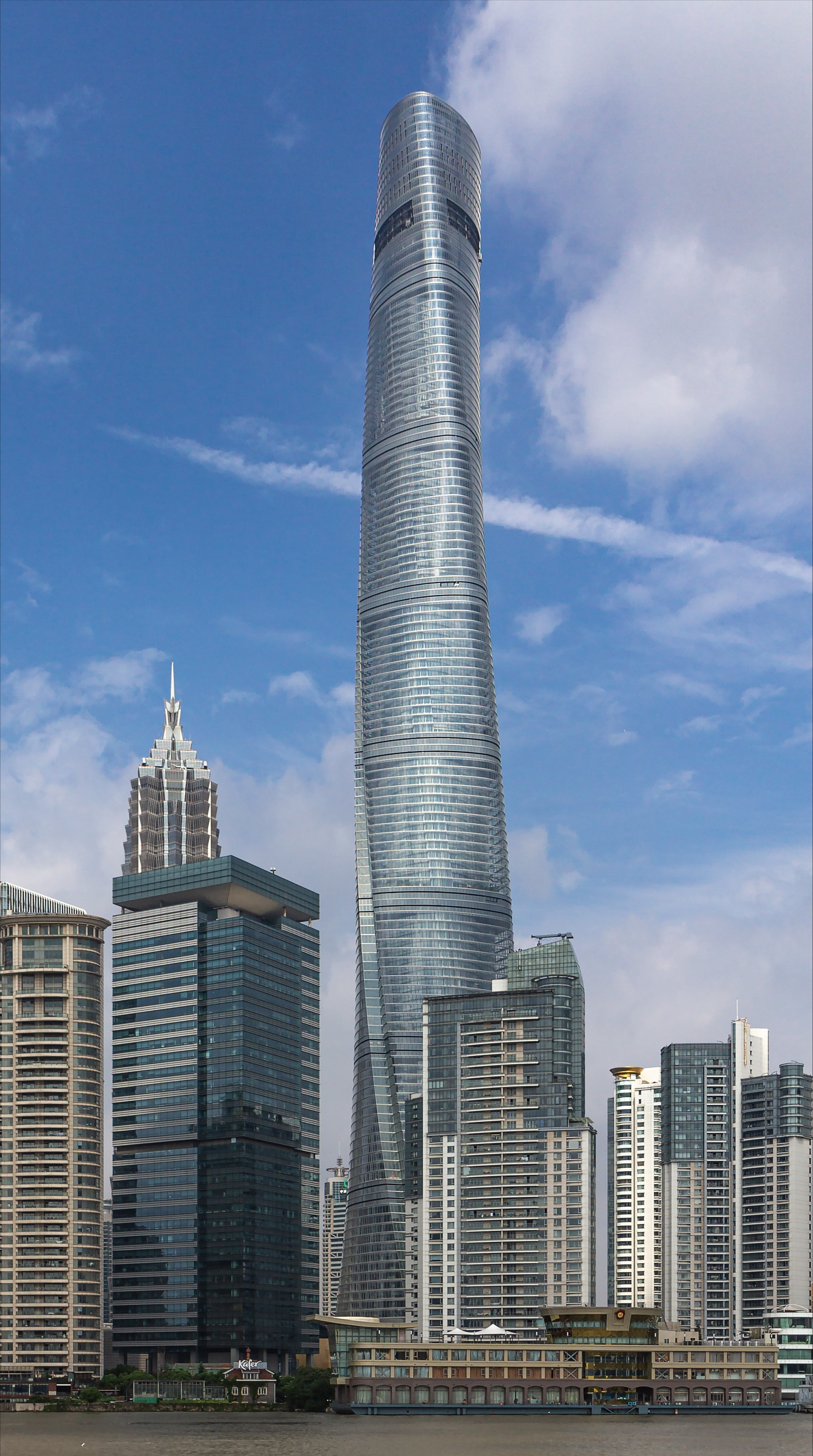
From left to right, the three cities whose tallest buildings are the tallest in the world: Dubai (Burj Khalifa), Kuala Lumpur (Merdeka 118), and Shanghai (Shanghai Tower)

This list of tallest buildings by city ranks cities by the height of their tallest completed building. Tall buildings, such as skyscrapers, are intended here as enclosed structures with continuously habitable floors. This definition excludes non-building structures, such as observation towers, and radio towers.

A city's tallest building may become iconic symbols of their respective cities, such as The Shard in London, Willis Tower (formerly known as the Sears Tower) in Chicago, and the Petronas Towers in Kuala Lumpur (which remained the tallest buildings in Kuala Lumpur until the completion of Merdeka 118). Over time, they may be recognized as notable tourist attractions and landmarks.

Currently, the five cities whose tallest building is among the tallest in the world are Dubai, Kuala Lumpur, Shanghai, Mecca, and Shenzhen. Most of the cities in the list constructed their tallest building in the 21st century, including all of the top ten.

== List of cities by tallest building ==
The following list ranks cities by the height of their tallest completed or topped-out building. Only cities for which data is available and whose tallest building is above 100 meters (328 feet) are included. The height given is measured from the level of the lowest significant open-air pedestrian entrance to the structural or architectural top. Buildings on hold that would have been the tallest in their city are not included, while floors indicate the number of floors above ground.

Of the 50 highest ranked cities, four-fifths of them are in Asia, and over half are in China.

Architecturally topped out but not yet completed

=== Cities with supertall skyscrapers ===
Rank	City	Country	Tallest building	Height (m)	Height (ft)	Floors	Year	Notes
1	Dubai	United Arab Emirates	Burj Khalifa	828	2,717	163	2010	
2	Kuala Lumpur	Malaysia	Merdeka 118	678.9	2,227	118	2024	
3	Shanghai	China	Shanghai Tower	632	2,073	128	2015	
4	Mecca	Saudi Arabia	Makkah Royal Clock Tower	601	1,972	120	2012	
5	Shenzhen	China	Ping An International Finance Centre	599.1	1,966	115	2017	
6	Tianjin	China	Goldin Finance 117	596.6	1,957	128	2027	
7	Seoul	South Korea	Lotte World Tower	554.5	1,819	123	2017	
8	New York City	United States	One World Trade Center	541.3	1,776	104	2014	
9	Guangzhou	China	Guangzhou CTF Finance Centre	530	1,740	111	2016	
10	Beijing	China	CITIC Tower	527.7	1,731	109	2018	
11	Taipei	Taiwan	Taipei 101	508	1,667	101	2004	
12	Hong Kong	Hong Kong	International Commerce Centre	484	1,588	108	2010	
13	Wuhan	China	Wuhan Greenland Center	475.6	1,560	101	2023	
14	Saint Petersburg	Russia	Lakhta Center	462	1,516	87	2019	
15	Ho Chi Minh City	Vietnam	Landmark 81	461.2	1,513	81	2018	
16	Chongqing	China	Chongqing International Land-Sea Center	458	1,503	98	2026	
17	Changsha	China	Changsha IFS Tower T1	452.1	1,483	94	2018	
18 =	Nanjing	China	Zifeng Tower	450	1,480	89	2010	
18 =	Suzhou	China	Suzhou IFS	450	1,480	95	2019	
20	Chicago	United States	Willis Tower	442.1	1,450	108	1974	
21 =	Jinan	China	Shandong International Financial Center	428	1,404	88	2026	
21 =	Haikou	China	Hainan Center Tower 1	428	1,404	94	2026	
23	Dongguan	China	Minying International Trade Center 1	422.6	1,386	85	2021	
24	Kuwait City	Kuwait	Al Hamra Tower	412.6	1,354	80	2011	
25	Busan	South Korea	Haeundae LCT The Sharp Landmark Tower	411.6	1,350	101	2019	
26	Ningbo	China	Ningbo Central Plaza	409	1,342	80	2024	
27	Nanning	China	Guangxi China Resources Tower	402.7	1,321	86	2020	
28	Guiyang	China	Guiyang International Financial Center T1	401	1,316	79	2020	
29	New Administrative Capital	Egypt	Iconic Tower	393.8	1,292	77	2023	
30	Wenzhou	China	Lucheng Square	388.9	1,276	79	2028	
31	Riyadh	Saudi Arabia	Public Investment Fund Tower	385	1,263	80	2021	
32	Dalian	China	Eton Place Dalian Tower 1	383.2	1,257	80	2016	
33	Jakarta	Indonesia	Autograph Tower	382.9	1,256	75	2022	
34	Abu Dhabi	United Arab Emirates	Burj Mohammed bin Rashid	381.2	1,251	88	2014	
35	Moscow	Russia	Federation Tower (East Tower)	373.7	1,226	93	2016	
36	Qingdao	China	Haitian Center Tower 2	368.9	1,210	73	2021	
37	Istanbul	Turkey	CBRT Tower	352	1,155	59	2024	
38	Ras al Khaimah	United Arab Emirates	Wynn Al Marjan Island	352	1,155	70	2027	
39	Toronto	Canada	SkyTower at Pinnacle One Yonge	351.4	1,153	106	2026	
40	Shenyang	China	Forum 66 Tower 1	350.6	1,150	68	2015	
41	Xi'an	China	Xi'an Glory International Financial Center	350	1,148	75	2021	
42	Kunming	China	Spring City 66	349	1,145	61	2019	
43	Kaohsiung	Taiwan	85 Sky Tower	348	1,140	75	1997	
44	Xiamen	China	Xiamen Cross Strait Financial Centre	343.9	1,128	68	2025	
45 =	Philadelphia	United States	Comcast Technology Center	339	1,112	60	2018	
45 =	Wuxi	China	Wuxi International Finance Square	339	1,112	68	2014	
47	Zhenjiang	China	Suning Plaza Tower 1	338	1,109	75	2018	
48	Zhuhai	China	Hengqin International Finance Center	337.7	1,108	69	2020	
49	Los Angeles	United States	Wilshire Grand Center	335.3	1,100	73	2017	
50	Changzhou	China	Modern Media Center	333	1,093	58	2013	
51	Pyongyang	North Korea	Ryugyong Hotel	330	1,083	105	N/D	
52	Hanoi	Vietnam	Landmark 72	328.6	1,078	72	2012	
53	San Francisco	United States	Salesforce Tower	326.1	1,070	61	2018	
54	Tokyo	Japan	Azabudai Hills Mori JP Tower	325.2	1,067	64	2023	
55	Yantai	China	Yantai Shimao No.1 The Harbour	323	1,060	59	2017	
56	Gold Coast	Australia	Q1	322.5	1,058	78	2005	
57	Jeddah	Saudi Arabia	Sumou Tower 1	322	1,056	72	2026	
58	Mumbai	India	Palais Royale	320	1,050	88	2026	
59 =	Bangkok	Thailand	Magnolia Waterfront Residences	318	1,043	70	2018	
59 =	Huzhou	China	Taihu Lake Main Landmark Tower	318	1,043	66	2026	
59 =	Taguig	Philippines	Metrobank Center	318	1,043	66	2017	
62	Atlanta	United States	Bank of America Plaza	317	1,040	55	1992	
63	Melbourne	Australia	Australia 108	316.7	1,039	100	2020	
64	Lanzhou	China	Honglou Times Square	313	1,027	56	2018	
65	Austin	United States	Waterline	312.4	1,025	74	2026	
66	Astana	Kazakhstan	Abu Dhabi Plaza	310.8	1,020	75	2022	
67	Warsaw	Poland	Varso	310	1,018	53	2022	
68	London	United Kingdom	The Shard	309.6	1,016	73	2013	
69	Givatayim	Israel	Beyond Office Tower	308.3	1,011	73	2026	
70	Houston	United States	JPMorgan Chase Tower	305.4	1,002	75	1982	
71 =	Incheon	South Korea	Northeast Asia Trade Tower	305	1,001	68	2011	
71 =	Monterrey	Mexico	T.Op Torre 1	305	1,001	64	2020	
71 =	Zhongshan	China	International Trade Center	305	1,001	65	2019	
74	Hangzhou	China	Greenland Hangzhou Center	303.7	996	64	2023	
75 =	Liuzhou	China	Diwang International Fortune Center	303	994	72	2015	
75 =	Nanchang	China	Jiangxi Nanchang Greenland Central Plaza	303	994	59	2015	
77	Doha	Qatar	Lusail Plaza Tower 3	300.7	986	64	2023	
78 =	Santiago	Chile	Gran Torre Santiago	300	984	64	2013	
79 =	Osaka	Japan	Abeno Harukas	300	984	59	2014	
79 =	Fuzhou	China	Shenglong Global Center	300	984	57	2019	

=== Cities without supertall skyscrapers ===
Rank	City	Country	Tallest building	Height (m)	Height (ft)	Floors	Year	Notes
1	Taizhou, Zhejiang	China	Taizhou Tiansheng Center	299	981	66	2023	
2	Yokohama	Japan	Yokohama Landmark Tower	296.3	972	73	1993	
3	Balneario Camboriú	Brazil	Yachthouse by Pininfarina Tower 2	294.1	965	80	2023	
4	New Alamein	Egypt	Alamein Iconic Tower	291.8	957	67	2026	
5	Cleveland	United States	Key Tower	288.7	947	57	1991	
6 =	Huizhou	China	Kaisa Center	288	945	66	2015	
6 =	Shaoxing	China	Shaoxing Shimao Crowne Plaza	288	945	55	2012	
6 =	Yibin	China	OCT Yibin Center	288	945	59	2024	
9	Wenling	China	Wenling Sheraton	286	938	54	2026	
10	Seattle	United States	Columbia Center	284.4	933	76	1984	
11 =	Chengdu	China	Tiantou International Business Center 1	284	932	59	2021	
11 =	Panama City	Panama	JW Marriott Panama	284	932	70	2011	
13	Zhengzhou	China	Greenland Zhengzhou Central Plaza South Tower	283.9	931	63	2017	
14	Singapore	Singapore	Guoco Tower	283.7	931	65	2016	
15	Changchun	China	Changchun China Resources Center Tower 1	282.7	927	64	2025	
16	Dallas	United States	Bank of America Plaza	280.7	921	72	1985	
17	Hefei	China	China Resources Center 2	280	919	65	2017	
18	San Pedro Garza García	Mexico	Torre KOI	279.1	916	65	2017	
19	Johor Bahru	Malaysia	The Astaka Tower A	278.8	915	72	2018	
20	Baku	Azerbaijan	Baku Tower	276.3	906	49	2020	
21	Makati	Philippines	Park Central North Tower	276	906	69	2025	
22	Wuhu	China	Riverside Century Plaza Main Tower	275	902	66	2015	
23	Brisbane	Australia	Brisbane Skytower	274.3	900	90	2019	
24	Nantong	China	Nantong Zhongnan International Plaza	273.3	897	53	2011	
25	Karachi	Pakistan	Bahria Icon Tower	273	896	62	2021	
26	Sydney	Australia	One Barangaroo	271.3	890	71	2020	
27	Jersey City	United States	99 Hudson Street	271	889	76	2020	
28	Harbin	China	R&F Riverside New City - Ritz-Carlton Hotel	269.9	885	56	2020	
29	Manama	Bahrain	Four Seasons Hotel	269.7	885	50	2015	
30	Jiaxing	China	Global Trade Center	268	879	52	2025	
31	Tashkent	Uzbekistan	Nest One	266.5	874	51	2023	
32	Taiyuan	China	Taiyuan Cinda IFC	266.1	873	55	2019	
33	Xuzhou	China	Suning Plaza Tower A	266	873	62	2017	
34	Mexico City	Mexico	Mitikah	265.8	872	66	2022	
35	Charlotte	United States	Bank of America Corporate Center	265.5	871	60	1992	
36	Phnom Penh	Cambodia	KBX Universal Financial Center	264.6	868	63	2026	
37	Algiers	Algeria	Great Mosque of Algiers Tower	264.3	867	36	2019	
38	Foshan	China	German Service Center Tower A	264.1	866	56	2022	
39	Frankfurt	Germany	Commerzbank Tower	259	850	56	1997	
40	Zaozhuang	China	Twin Star Square Tower 1	258.7	849	41	2022	
41	Macau	Macau	Grand Lisboa	258	846	48	2008	
42	Oklahoma City	United States	Devon Energy Center	257.2	844	52	2012	
43	Pittsburgh	United States	U.S. Steel Tower	256.3	841	64	1970	
44	Izumisano	Japan	Rinku Gate Tower Building	256	840	56	1996	
45	Perth	Australia	Central Park	252.9	830	52	1992	
46	Miami	United States	Panorama Tower	251.9	827	81	2018	
47	Salé	Morocco	Mohammed VI Tower	250	820	55	2023	
48	Mandaluyong	Philippines	The Mega Tower	249.7	819	50	2021	
49 =	Kolkata	India	The 42	249	817	65	2019	
49 =	Madrid	Spain	Torre de Cristal	249	817	50	2008	
51	Edmonton	Canada	Stantec Tower	248.9	816	66	2019	
52	Taizhou, Jiangsu	China	Taizhou Xingye International Center	248.8	816	58	2019	
53 =	Hwaseong	South Korea	Hwaseong Dongtan Metapolis 101	248.7	816	66	2010	
54 =	Penang	Malaysia	Menara Komtar	248.7	816	68	1985	
55 =	Calgary	Canada	Brookfield Place	247	810	56	2017	
55 =	Nagoya	Japan	Midland Square	247	810	48	2007	
57	Shijiazhuang	China	Kaiyuan Finance Center	246	807	52	2012	
58	Gothenburg	Sweden	Karlatornet	246	807	74	2024	
59	Ramat Gan	Israel	Moshe Aviv Tower	244	801	68	2001	
60	Yixing	China	Yixing Dongjiu Tower	243.8	800	56	2012	
61	Puteaux	France	The Link	241.6	792	52	2026	
62	Minneapolis	United States	IDS Center	241.4	792	55	1973	
63	Boston	United States	John Hancock Tower	240.8	790	62	1976	
64	Bucheon	South Korea	Bucheon Kumho Richensia Tower 1	240.7	790	66	2012	
65 =	Colombo	Sri Lanka	Altair	240	787	68	2019	
65 =	Izmir	Turkey	Mahall Bomonti Izmir	240	787	58	2023	
65 =	Pasig	Philippines	The Imperium at Capital Commons	240	787	63	2019	
68	Tel Aviv	Israel	Azrieli Sarona Tower	238.4	782	61	2017	
69	Nanchong	China	Greenland City Tower 1	238	781	52	2026	
70	Sanya	China	Atlantis Hotel Sanya	236	774	48	2018	
71	Hyderabad	India	SAS Crown	235.3	772	58	2025	
72	Buenos Aires	Argentina	Alvear Tower	235.2	772	55	2018	
73 =	Pattaya	Thailand	Reflection Jomtien Beach Oceanfront Tower 1	234	768	57	2013	
73 =	Johannesburg	South Africa	The Leonardo	234	768	56	2019	
75	Yinchuan	China	Defeng Skyscraper	233.2	765	47	2019	
76	Montreal	Canada	1 Square Phillips	232.5	763	61	2025	
77	Courbevoie	France	Tour First	231	758	56	2011	
78 =	Goyang	South Korea	Ilsan Yojin Y-City Tower 103	230	755	59	2016	
78 =	Manila	Philippines	Grand Riviera Suites	230	755	57	2014	
78 =	Ürümqi	China	Fortune Plaza	230	755	56	2008	
81	Yichang	China	Yichang International Plaza Tower 1	229.9	754	48	2021	
82	Sanmenxia	China	Media Tower	228.4	749	38	2018	
83	Ma'anshan	China	Ma'anshan Golden Eagle Tiandi Tower A	228	748	45	2017	
84	Mobile	United States	RSA Battle House Tower	227.1	745	35	2007	
85 =	Daegu	South Korea	Suseong Leader's View Tower A	225	738	57	2010	
85 =	Puebla	Mexico	Torre Inxignia JV	225	738	45	2023	
85 =	Caracas	Venezuela	Parque Central Torre Officinas 1	225	738	56	1979	
85 =	Sharjah	United Arab Emirates	Nestle Plaza	225	738	58	2008	
85 =	Taichung	Taiwan	Taichung Commercial Bank Headquarters	225	758	38	2025	
90	Las Vegas	United States	Fontainebleau Las Vegas	224	735	67	2023	
91	Quezon City	Philippines	Skysuites Residential Tower	223	732	44	2018	
92	Detroit	United States	Detroit Marriott at the Renaissance Center	221.5	727	70	1977	
93 =	Ganzhou	China	China Merchants Center	220	722	47	2023	
93 =	Vienna	Austria	DC Tower I	220	722	58	2013	
93 =	Xiangyang	China	Minfa Ruiji Hotel	220	722	49	2020	
93 =	Zhanjiang	China	Zhanjiang Hengyi Bay Phase III 1	220	722	49	2022	
93 =	São Paulo	Brazil	Alto das Nações	219	719	39	2026	
98	Atlantic City	United States	Ocean Casino Resort	218.9	718	53	2012	
99	Xining	China	Era Shenghua Office Building	218.6	717	39	2021	
100	Milan	Italy	UniCredit Tower	217.7	714	33	2012	
101	Denver	United States	Republic Plaza	217.6	714	56	1984	
102	Bogotá	Colombia	BD Bacatá Torre Sur	216	709	66	2018	
103	Burnaby	Canada	Two Gilmore Place	215.8	708	64	2024	
104 =	Cheonan	South Korea	Asan SK Pentaport Residential Tower 3	215	705	66	2011	
104 =	Dongying	China	Dongying World Finance Center	215	705	48	2020	
104 =	Rotterdam	Netherlands	De Zalmhaven	215	705	59	2022	
104 =	Wroclaw	Poland	Sky Tower	215	705	51	2013	
104 =	Yiwu	China	World Trade Center 1	215	705	62	2016	
109	Nonthaburi	Thailand	The Politan Aqua West Tower	214.3	703	61	2020	
110	Indianapolis	United States	Salesforce Tower	213.7	701	49	1990	
111	Ajman	United Arab Emirates	Corniche Tower	213	700	53	2010	
112	Hamamatsu	Japan	ACT Tower	212.8	698	45	1994	
113	New Orleans	United States	Hancock Whitney Center	212.5	697	51	1972	
114	Luoyang	China	Zhengda International Plaza 7	211.8	695	50	2018	
115	Bnei Brak	Israel	Nimrodi Tower	211.3	693	52	2023	
116 =	Batumi	Georgia	Alliance Centropolis Tower C	210	689	56	2028	
116 =	Shanwei	China	Shenshan Greenland Business Center	210	689	42	2026	
118	Addis Ababa	Ethiopia	Commercial Bank of Ethiopia Headquarters	209.3	687	53	2021	
119 =	Paris	France	Tour Montparnasse	209	686	58	1973	
119 =	Yekaterinburg	Russia	Iset Tower	209	686	52	2015	
121 =	Lianyungang	China	Sunshine International Tower	208	682	60	2017	
121 =	Delhi	India	The Amaryllis Versace	208	682	49	2026	
123	New Taipei City	Taiwan	Far Eastern Banqiao Tower	207.4	680	50	2013	
124 =	Bengbu	China	Huijin International Center	207	679	53	2024	
124 =	Petaling Jaya	Malaysia	Sheraton Petaling Jaya Hotel	207	679	49	2017	
124 =	Shangyu	China	Baiguan Plaza	207	679	50	2012	
127	Omaha	United States	Mutual of Omaha Headquarters Tower	206	677	44	2026	
128	Rizhao	China	Aetna Sonnenschein International Plaza	206	676	47	2018	
129 =	Turin	Italy	Piedmont Region Headquarters	205	672	42	2022	
129 =	Basel	Switzerland	Roche Tower 2	205	672	50	2022	
131	Sunny Isles Beach	United States	Estates at Acqualina Boutique North Tower	204.8	672	52	2023	
132 =	Guadalajara	Mexico	Hotel Riu Plaza Guadalajara	204	669	42	2011	
132 =	Kawasaki	Japan	Park City Musashi-Kosugi Mid Sky Tower	204	669	59	2009	
134	Tulsa	United States	BOK Tower	203.3	667	52	1975	
135	Baoji	China	Baoji IFC	203.2	667	41	2017	
136	Cincinnati	United States	Great American Tower at Queen City Square	202.7	665	40	2011	
137	Sofia	Bulgaria	Sky Fort	202.2	663	47	2026	
138 =	Cartagena	Colombia	Hotel Estelar Bocagrande	202	663	52	2017	
138 =	Lu'an	China	Wanda Plaza Tower 1	202	663	47	2021	
140 =	Surabaya	Indonesia	Tunjungan Plaza 5	201	659	50	2015	
140 =	Ulsan	South Korea	Taehwa River Iaan Exordium 1	201	659	54	2010	
140 =	Yuxi	China	Yuxi Mining Building	201	659	39	2013	
143	Vancouver	Canada	Living Shangri-La	200.9	659	59	2009	
144	Manchester	United Kingdom	Deansgate Square South Tower	200.5	658	66	2020	
145	Nairobi	Kenya	Britam Tower	200.1	656	31	2017	
146 =	Jiangmen	China	Jiangmen Wanda Plaza A	200	656	45	2014	
146 =	Khobar	Saudi Arabia	Suwaiket Tower	200	656	46	2012	
146 =	Lyon	France	Tour Incity	200	656	39	2015	
146 =	Mississauga	Canada	M2	200	656	62	2023	
150	Gurgaon	India	Trump Tower Delhi NCR Tower 1	198.8	652	47	2026	
151	Bandar Lampung	Indonesia	Grand Mercure Lampung	196.5	645	35	2022	
152	Changwon	South Korea	Metro City 207	195.8	642	55	2015	
153	Ankara	Turkey	Elya Royal Tower	195.4	641	45	2020	
154	Beirut	Lebanon	Sama Beirut	195.2	640	52	2017	
155	Cheongju	South Korea	G-Well City Landmark Tower	195	640	55	2015	
156	Vaughan	Canada	CG Tower	193.2	634	60	2024	
157 =	Daejeon	South Korea	Daejeon Science Complex	193	633	43	2021	
157 =	Hiroshima	Japan	City Tower Hiroshima	193	633	54	2016	
159	Kota Kinabalu	Malaysia	Jesselton Twin Tower A	192.2	630	56	2023	
160 =	Baoding	China	Vanbo Plaza South Tower	192	630	53	2015	
160 =	Des Moines	United States	801 Grand	192	630	44	1991	
160 =	Hat Yai	Thailand	Napalai Place	192	630	46	1999	
160 =	Tabriz	Iran	Tabriz World Trade Center	192	630	37	2019	
164	Goiânia	Brazil	Órion Business & Health Complex	191.5	628	44	2018	
165	Columbus	United States	Rhodes State Office Tower	190.2	624	41	1973	
166 =	Kobe	Japan	City Tower Kobe Sannomiya	190	623	54	2013	
166 =	Malmö	Sweden	Turning Torso	190	623	57	2005	
166 =	Ramat HaSharon	Israel	Big Fashion Glilot 1	190	623	45	2026	
166 =	San Juan	Philippines	Viridian at Greenhills	190	623	53	2016	
170	Kansas City	United States	One Kansas City Place	189.9	623	40	1988	
171 =	Ordos City	China	Cathay Pacific Plaza 1	189	620	41	2014	
172	Phan Rang–Tháp Chàm	Vietnam	SunBay Park Nuvensa	188.9	620	48	2023	
173	Sejong City	South Korea	Sejong Hanshin the Hue Reserve 601	188.3	618	44	2021	
174 =	Jacksonville	United States	Bank of America Tower	188.1	617	42	1990	
174 =	Nashville	United States	333 Commerce	188.1	617	33	1994	
176 =	Amman	Jordan	Amman Rotana	188	617	50	2015	
176 =	Guilin	China	Guilin Jin Trade Center 1	188	617	47	2019	
176 =	Zhangjiagang	China	Huijin Center Tower 1	188	617	39	2019	
179	Auckland	New Zealand	Seascape	187.2	614	50	2026	
180	Benidorm	Spain	Intempo	187.1	614	49	2021	
181 =	Zibo	China	Zibo Huijin Building	187	614	36	2013	
182 =	Haiphong	Vietnam	Diamond Crown Tower	186	610	45	2026	
182 =	Kawaguchi	Japan	Elsa Tower 55	186	610	55	1998	
184 =	Kotte	Sri Lanka	Clearpoint Residencies	185	607	48	2017	
184 =	Suwon	South Korea	Samsung Electronics R&D Center Phase II	185	607	28	2005	
186	Toyonaka	Japan	Cielia Tower Senri Chuo	184.9	607	52	2019	
187	Milwaukee	United States	U.S. Bank Center	183.2	601	42	1973	
188 =	Cali	Colombia	Cali Tower	183	600	44	1980	
188 =	Nanterre	France	Tour Granite	183	600	36	2008	
190	Bellevue	United States	Sonic	182.9	600	42	2023	
191	João Pessoa	Brazil	Tour Geneve	182.3	598	51	2018	
192 =	Chiba	Japan	Apa Hotel & Resort Tokyo Bay	180.8	593	49	1993	
192 =	St. Louis	United States	One Metropolitan Square	180.8	593	42	1988	
194	Seville	Spain	Sevilla Tower	180.5	592	40	2016	
195 =	Erbil	Iraq	E1 Tower	180	591	48	2023	
195 =	Noida	India	Supertech Nova	180	591	44	2019	
195 =	Quanzhou	China	Puxi Wanda Plaza A	180	591	46	2012	
195 =	Sendai	Japan	Sendai Trust Tower	180	591	37	2010	
199 =	Albany	United States	Erastus Corning Tower	179.5	589	44	1973	
199 =	Shah Alam	Malaysia	Sunsuria Forum Residential Suites	179.5	589	50	2024	
201 =	Cebu City	Philippines	Horizons 101	178	584	55	2017	
201 =	New Westminster	Canada	Pier West 1	178	584	53	2024	
203	Niagara Falls, Ontario	Canada	Niagara Falls Hilton Fallsview North Tower	177.1	581	58	2009	
204	Mersin	Turkey	Mersin Complex	176.8	580	52	1987	
205	Tampa	United States	100 North Tampa	176.5	579	42	1992	
206 =	Berlin	Germany	Estrel Tower	176	577	45	2026	
206 =	Genting Highlands	Malaysia	GEO Resort & Hotel	176	577	46	2019	
208	Sapporo	Japan	ONE Sapporo Station Tower	175.2	575	48	2023	
209 =	Anyang	South Korea	AcroTower 1	175	574	37	2007	
209 =	Barranquilla	Colombia	The Icon	175	574	41	2021	
209 =	Medellin	Colombia	Edificio Coltejer	175	574	37	1972	
212	Sandy Springs	United States	Concourse Corporate Center V	173.7	570	34	1988	
213	Zapopan	Mexico	Hyatt Regency Andares	173	568	41	2017	
214 =	Fort Worth	United States	Burnett Plaza	172.9	567	40	1983	
214 =	Yongin	South Korea	Heungdeok IT Valley	172.9	567	40	2013	
216 =	Asunción	Paraguay	Petra Tower	172	564	44	2025	
216 =	Sarajevo	Bosnia and Herzegovina	Avaz Twist Tower	172	564	39	2008	
216 =	Chennai	India	Highliving District Tower-H—SPR City	172	564	47	2020	
219	Baghdad	Iraq	Central Bank of Iraq Tower	171.9	564	37	2026	
220	Putrajaya	Malaysia	KPWKM Tower	171.8	564	39	2011	
221 =	Fangchenggang	China	Fangchenggang North Bay Finance Center	171.7	563	42	2017	
221 =	São Paulo	Brazil	Alto das Nações	219	719	48	2026	
221 =	Yeoju	South Korea	Yeoju KCC Switzen 101	171.7	563	49	2019	
224	Weihai	China	Zhongxin Finance Tower	171.2	562	42	1998	
225	Miami Beach	United States	Blue Diamond Tower	170.4	559	44	2000	
226	Huixquilcan	Mexico	Bosque Real Residence Torre 3-4	170.1	558	42	2021	
227 =	Fujairah	United Arab Emirates	Al Jaber Tower	170	558	43	2008	
227 =	Limassol	Cyprus	One Limassol	170	558	37	2022	
227 =	Monaco	Monaco	Odeon Tower	170	558	49	2015	
230	Nova Lima	Brazil	Concórdia Corporate	169.6	556	43	2018	
231	Jeju City	South Korea	Dream Tower 1	169	554	38	2020	
232 =	Pyeongtaek	South Korea	Hillstate Godeok Central	168.8	554	49	2024	
232 =	Quy Nhon	Vietnam	Pullman Quy Nhon	168.8	554	42	2020	
234	Bat Yam	Israel	Eden Tower	168.5	553	47	2022	
235	Saitama	Japan	Land Axis Tower	168.3	552	35	2002	
236 =	Almaty	Kazakhstan	Esentai Tower	168	551	36	2008	
236 =	Beihai	China	Triumph International Commerce Hotel	168	551	33	2007	
236 =	Belgrade	Serbia	Belgrade Tower	168	551	42	2023	
236 =	Bratislava	Slovakia	Eurovea Tower	168	551	46	2023	
236 =	Chongzuo	China	Chongzuo FBC Financial Center	168	551	41	2017	
236 =	Kyiv	Ukraine	Klovskyi Descent 7	168	551	47	2011	
236 =	Qinzhou	China	Qinzhou North Bay International Hotel	168	551	43	2017	
243	Louisville	United States	400 West Market	167.3	549	35	1992	
244 =	Gunpo	South Korea	Hillstate Geumjeong Station 201	167	548	49	2022	
244 =	Laibin	China	Laibin Yuda Building	167	548	38	2013	
244 =	Si Racha	Thailand	Oakwood Hotel & Residence Sri Rach	167	548	44	2017	
247	Da Nang	Vietnam	Da Nang City Administrative Centre	166.8	547	34	2014	
248	Fortaleza	Brazil	Epic Tower	166.7	547	50	2026	
249 =	Little Rock	United States	Simmons Tower	166.4	546	40	1986	
249 =	Portland	United States	Wells Fargo Center	166.4	546	40	1973	
249 =	San Antonio	United States	San Antonio Marriott Rivercenter	166.4	546	38	1988	
252	Nha Trang	Vietnam	Muong Thanh Hotel	166.1	545	47	2015	
253	Cairo	Egypt	Fouda Tower	166	545	50	N/D	
254	Icheon	South Korea	Icheon Lotte Castle Gold Sky 101	165.1	542	49	2018	
255 =	Bilbao	Spain	Iberdrola Tower	165	541	37	2011	
255 =	Navi Mumbai	India	Metro Paramount	165	541	35	2026	
255 =	Pune	India	Amanora Gateway Towers	165	541	45	2021	
258	Mokpo	South Korea	Hadang Jungheung S-CLASS Centum View 104	164.8	541	49	2022	
259 =	Minsk	Belarus	International Finance Center	164	538	42	2026	
259 =	Pohang	South Korea	Jangseong Doosan We've The Zenith Tower 1	164	538	48	2010	
259 =	Raleigh	United States	PNC Plaza	164	538	32	2008	
259 =	Rio de Janeiro	Brazil	Rio Sul Center	164	538	48	1982	
263	Pasay	Philippines	Grand View Tower	163.7	537	46	2024	
264	La Paz	Bolivia	Green Tower	163.4	536	40	2022	
265 =	Bucaramanga	Colombia	Majestic	163.1	535	42	2015	
265 =	Hartford	United States	City Place I	163.1	535	38	1980	
267 =	Gifu	Japan	Gifu City Tower 43	163	535	43	2007	
267 =	Konya	Turkey	Seljuk Tower	163	535	42	2006	
267 =	Tangerang	Indonesia	Amartapura	163	535	52	1996	
270	Bonn	Germany	Post Tower	162.5	533	42	2002	
271 =	Coquitlam	Canada	567 Clarke + Como	162.2	532	49	2021	
271 =	Gaziantep	Turkey	Iconova Block R	162.2	532	43	2018	
273 =	Gwangmyeong	South Korea	Gwangmyeong Station Taeyoung Desian	162	531	49	2019	
273 =	Léon	Mexico	Torre 40 Lumière	162	531	44	2020	
273 =	Salvador	Brazil	International Trade Center Salvador	162	531	37	2018	
273 =	Tehran	Iran	Tehran International Tower	162	531	54	2007	
273 =	Uijeongbu	South Korea	Uijeongbu Station Sky Xi	162	531	49	2024	
278	Fukuoka	Japan	Island City Ocean & Forest Towers Residence	161.3	529	48	2022	
279 =	Baltimore	United States	Transamerica Tower	161.2	529	40	1973	
279 =	Buffalo	United States	Seneca One Tower	161.2	529	38	1974	
281	Jeonju	South Korea	Jeonju Daebang the M City	161.1	529	45	2020	
282 =	Bengaluru	India	CNTC Presidential Tower	161	528	50	2023	
282 =	Narashino	Japan	Tsudanuma The Tower	161	528	44	2020	
282 =	Santo Domingo	Dominican Republic	Anacaona 27 Tower	161	528	41	2017	
285	Chuncheon	South Korea	Chuncheon Central Tower Prugio 101	160.5	526	49	2022	
286	Lagos	Nigeria	NECOM House	160.3	526	32	1979	
287 =	Dar es Salaam	Tanzania	PPF Headquarters	160	525	37	2019	
287 =	Huế	Vietnam	Meliá Vinpearl Hue	160	525	39	2018	
287 =	Ichikawa	Japan	Tower A Ichikawa Station	160	525	45	2009	
287 =	Vladivostok	Russia	Aquamarine 2-3	160	525	40	2021	
291	Handan	China	Global Center 1	159.6	524	39	2021	
292	Ha Long	Vietnam	Alacarte Halong Bay Condotel	158.7	521	41	2022	
293	Nilai	Malaysia	Mesahill Premier @ Mesahill	158.3	520	42	2023	
294 =	Bekasi	Indonesia	Grand Kamala Lagoon Tower Barclay	158	518	44	2017	
294 =	Hà Tĩnh	Vietnam	Melia Vinpearl Ha Tinh	158	518	36	2017	
294 =	Tangshan	China	Tangshan New World Center	158	518	31	2016	
294 =	Yulin	China	Yulin Beiliu Tianhe Fortune Square	158	518	44	2017	
298	Montevideo	Uruguay	Telecommunications Tower	157.6	517	32	2002	
299	Hachiōji	Japan	Hachioji Station South Exit Redevelopment Building	157.5	517	40	2010	
300	Surrey	Canada	3 Civic Plaza	157.3	516	50	2018	
301 =	Ampang Jaya	Malaysia	Astoria Ampang	157	515	46	2020	
301 =	Batam	Indonesia	Meisterstadt A3	157	515	46	2021	
301 =	Cyberjaya	Malaysia	Eclipse Residence @ Pan'gaea 1	157	515	40	2018	
301 =	St. Petersburg	United States	400 Central	157	515	46	2025	
301 =	Subang Jaya	Malaysia	Sfera Residency	157	515	46	2019	
301 =	Tai'an	China	Wanda Realm Taian	157	515	41	2015	
307	Gdańsk	Poland	Olivia Star	156	512	35	2018	
308	Petah Tikva	Israel	B.S.R. City	155.8	511	30	2022	
309	Siheung	South Korea	Siheung Central Prugio 101	155.4	510	49	2020	
310 =	Birmingham	United Kingdom	One Eastside	155.2	509	51	2026	
310 =	Kota Bharu	Malaysia	ARIKA Kubang Kerian	155.2	509	42	2026	
312	Taicang	China	Taicang New Port Businese Area NO.1 Building	155.1	509	36	2010	
313 =	Anshan	China	Anshan Silong Building	155	509	43	2008	
313 =	Querétaro	Mexico	Hospital San José Moscati	155	509	40	2022	
313 =	Alexandria	Egypt	El Salam Tower	155	509	36	N/D	
316	Virginia Beach	United States	Westin Virginia Beach Town Center	154.8	508	38	2007	
317	Namyangju	South Korea	Hillstate Byeolnae Station	154.5	507	46	2021	
318 =	Ashdod	Israel	Dimri Tower	154	505	44	2020	
318 =	Barcelona	Spain	Hotel Arts	154	505	44	1992	
318 =	Cuiabá	Brazil	SB Tower	154	505	35	2016	
318 =	Havana	Cuba	La Torre López-Callejas	154	505	42	2025	
318 =	Miyazaki	Japan	Sheraton Grande Ocean Resort	154	505	45	1994	
318 =	Naju	South Korea	KEPCO Headquarters	154	505	31	2015	
324 =	Barueri	Brazil	Brascan Century Plaza Torre Offices	153.9	505	42	2019	
324 =	Hallandale Beach	United States	The Beach Club Tower 2	153.9	505	50	2006	
326	Maebashi	Japan	Gunma Prefectural Government Building	153.8	505	33	1999	
327	Văn Giang	Vietnam	Landmark Swanlake L1	153.5	504	40	2023	
328 =	Malacca	Malaysia	The Shore Tower 1	153	502	43	2013	
328 =	Taoyuan	Taiwan	ChungYuet Royal Landmark	153	502	38	2012	
330	Curitiba	Brazil	Universe Life Square	152.6	501	43	2014	
331	San Diego	United States	One American Plaza	152.4	500	34	1991	
332 =	Salford	United Kingdom	Cortland at Colliers Yard	152.3	500	50	2023	
332 =	Dhaka	Bangladesh	Shanta Pinnacle	152.3	500	40	2026	
334 =	Durban	South Africa	Pearl Dawn	152	499	31	2010	
334 =	Mashhad	Iran	Armitaj Golshan	152	499	34	2019	
334 =	Sagamihara	Japan	Proud Tower Sagamiono Cross	152	499	41	2025	
334 =	Kochi	India	Sands Infinit Towers	152	499	30	2025	
338	Fort Lee	United States	The Modern at Fort Lee North Tower	151.7	498	46	2014	
339	Honolulu	United States	Century Center	151.5	497	41	1978	
340	Takamatsu	Japan	Symbol Tower	151.3	496	30	2003	
341	Ansan	South Korea	Gran City Xi	151.2	496	49	2020	
342	Fort Lauderdale	United States	100 Las Olas	150.9	495	46	2020	
343	Medan	Indonesia	The Manhattan Tower 1	150.7	494	38	2019	
344 =	Amsterdam	Netherlands	Rembrandt Tower	150	492	35	1995	
344 =	Dammam	Saudi Arabia	AKH Tower	150	492	37	2018	
344 =	Guigang	China	Triumph International Office A	150	492	32	2018	
344 =	Itapema	Brazil	Noah	150	492	43	2023	
344 =	Praia Grande	Brazil	Jardim do Mar 1	150	492	42	2017	
344 =	Sulaymaniyah	Iraq	Grand Millennium Hotel	150	492	38	2013	
344 =	Wonsan	North Korea	Pukmang Tower 1	150	492	32	1984	
351	Cologne	Germany	Kölnturm	148.5	487	43	2001	
352 =	Brussels	Belgium	Tour du Midi	148	486	38	1996	
352 =	Pretoria	South Africa	South African Reserve Bank Building	148	486	38	1988	
354	Geoje	South Korea	Jangpyeong Yurim Norwegian Forest 101	147.8	485	49	2017	
355	Keelung	Taiwan	Crown Commercial Building	147.6	484	33	2001	
356	White Plains	United States	The Residences at the Ritz Carlton, Westchester	147.5	484	44	2009	
357 =	Hollywood, Florida	United States	Hyde Beach House	147.2	483	42	2018	
357 =	Phoenix	United States	Chase Tower	147.2	483	40	1972	
359 =	Bremerhaven	Germany	Atlantic Hotel Sail City	147	482	23	2008	
359 =	Tbilisi	Georgia	Axis Tower I	147	482	37	2019	
361	Osan	South Korea	Hyundai Terra Tower	146.4	480	29	2023	
362	Thủ Dầu Một	Vietnam	Happy One Central	146.3	480	40	2024	
363 =	The Hague	Netherlands	Ministerie van Binnenlandse Zaken	146	479	37	2012	
363 =	Londrina	Brazil	Maison Heritage	146	479	40	2014	
363 =	Munich	Germany	Hochhaus Uptown München	146	479	38	2004	
366	Kitakyushu	Japan	Kokura D.C. Tower	145.7	478	41	2011	
367 =	Ahmedabad	India	Mondeal One	145	476	35	2023	
367 =	Asan	South Korea	Cheonan Asan Station the LIV	145	476	45	2021	
367 =	Grozny	Russia	Olympus	145	476	40	2012	
367 =	Luanda	Angola	IMOB Business Tower	145	476	35	2018	
367 =	Rostov-on-Don	Russia	Belyy Angel	145	476	32	2018	
367 =	São Vicente	Brazil	Helbor Offices São Vicente	145	476	33	2016	
373	Jena	Germany	JenTower	144.5	474	31	1972	
374	Yangsan	South Korea	Yangsan Kumho Richencia Signature	144.2	473	44	2024	
375	Thuận An	Vietnam	The Emerald Golf View	144.1	473	40	2023	
376 =	Nantes	France	Tour Bretagne	144	472	32	1976	
376 =	Osasco	Brazil	The Cittyplex Osasco	144	472	42	2018	
376 =	Recife	Brazil	Maria Carolina Montenegro	144	472	42	2018	
376 =	Tripoli	Libya	Burj Bulaya Office Tower 1	144	472	34	2007	
376 =	Winnipeg	Canada	300 Main	144	472	42	2022	
381 =	Boca del Rio	Mexico	Torre Amura	143.8	472	33	2019	
381 =	Pak Kret	Thailand	Astro Condos	143.8	472	37	2013	
381 =	Yao	Japan	Mega City Towers the East	143.8	472	41	2013	
384 =	Gimpo	South Korea	Metro Tower Yemiji 101	143.7	471	46	2021	
384 =	Gwangyang	South Korea	e-Pyeonhansesang Gwangyang 101	143.7	471	48	2016	
386 =	Iksan	South Korea	Ubless 47 Mohyeon	143.6	471	47	2024	
386 =	Saint Paul	United States	Wells Fargo Place	143.6	471	37	1987	
386 =	Yokosuka	Japan	The Tower Yokosuka Chuo	143.6	471	40	2015	
389	Tysons	United States	Capital One Tower	143.3	470	31	2018	
390 =	Budapest	Hungary	MOL Campus	143	469	28	2022	
390 =	Ottawa	Canada	Claridge Icon	143	469	45	2021	
392 =	Marseille	France	Tour CMA-CGM	142.8	468	34	2010	
392 =	Yangpyeong	South Korea	Hyundai Sungwoo Ostar Koaroo	142.8	468	38	2012	
392 =	Sakai	Japan	Bell Marge Sakai Building 1	142.8	468	43	1999	
395	Aarhus	Denmark	Lighthouse 2.0	142.6	468	44	2022	
396 =	Leipzig	Germany	City-Hochhaus Leipzig	142.5	468	36	1972	
396 =	San Andrés Cholula	Mexico	Torre Helea	142.5	468	34	2022	
398	Uiwang	South Korea	Uiwang Seohae Grand Bleu 103	142.4	467	42	2018	
399 =	Chiayi	Taiwan	voco Chiayi	142.2	466	34	2023	
399 =	Takatsuki	Japan	Geo Tower Takatsuki Muse Garden	142.2	466	42	2014	
401 =	Newark	United States	National Newark Building	142	466	35	1933	
402	Tilburg	Netherlands	Westpoint	141.6	465	48	2004	
403	Gimcheon	South Korea	KEPCO ENC Headquarters	141.2	463	28	2015	
404	Kedawang	Malaysia	Assana Serviced Suites	141.1	463	39	2026	
405 =	Rosario	Argentina	Dolfines Guaraní	141	463	45	2010	
405 =	San José	Costa Rica	Leumi Business Center	141	463	38	2021	
405 =	Sorocaba	Brazil	Ícone Planeta	141	463	41	2023	
408	Niigata	Japan	Bandaijima Building	140.5	461	31	2003	
409 =	Baton Rouge	United States	Louisiana State Capitol	140.2	460	34	1932	
409 =	Burbank	United States	The Tower Burbank	140.2	460	32	1988	
409 =	Winston-Salem	United States	100 North Main Street	140.2	460	34	1995	
412	Lima	Peru	Torre Banco de la Nación	140.1	460	30	2015	
413	Samut Prakan (?)	Thailand	Cathedral of Learning	159	522	39	2002	
414 =	Faridabad	India	Ansal Royal Heritage	140	459	33	2017	
414 =	Jundiaí	Brazil	The One Office Tower Jundiaí	140	459	34	2016	
414 =	Maringá	Brazil	Royal Garden	140	459	39	1991	
414 =	Muntinlupa	Philippines	Insular Life Corporate Center I	140	459	34	2000	
414 =	Netanya	Israel	Lagoon Towers 2	140	459	40	2016	
414 =	Palmas	Brazil	Orla Sky	140	459	40	2024	
414 =	Rondonópolis	Brazil	Splendore	140	459	39	2024	
414 =	Tainan	Taiwan	Shangri-La's Far Eastern Plaza Hotel Tainan	140	459	38	1993	
414 =	Tirana	Albania	Downtown One	140	459	37	2025	
414 =	Liverpool	United Kingdom	West Tower	140	459	40	2008	
414 =	Mangalore	India	Land Trades Altura	140	459	35	2025	
425	Campo Grande	Brazil	Vertigo Premium Studios	139.2	457	35	2021	
426	Cape Town	South Africa	Portside Tower	139	456	32	2014	
427	Gimhae	South Korea	Gimhae Prugio High-End 101	138.6	455	47	2023	
428	Birmingham, Alabama	United States	Shipt Tower	138.4	454	34	1986	
429 =	Adelaide	Australia	The Adelaidean	138	453	36	2020	
429 =	Natal	Brazil	Mirante João Olímpio Filho	138	453	43	2009	
429 =	Sihanoukville	Cambodia	Howard Johnson Plaza by Wyndham Blue Bay	138	453	36	2021	
429 =	Vientiane	Laos	Latsavong Plaza	138	453	32	2024	
433 =	Bucharest	Romania	Floreasca City Sky Tower	137	449	37	2012	
433 =	Haifa	Israel	Sail Tower	137	449	26	2002	
433 =	Khon Kaen	Thailand	The Houze Condominium	137	449	37	2016	
433 =	Ra'anana	Israel	Infinity Campus Tower	137	449	33	2024	
433 =	Vinh	Vietnam	Vincom Vinh	137	449	36	2023	
438	Richmond	United States	James Monroe Building	136.9	449	29	1981	
439 =	Hirakata	Japan	Kuzuha Tower City T	136.8	449	42	2003	
439 =	Salt Lake City	United States	Astra Tower	136.8	449	40	2024	
441	Õtsu	Japan	Otsu Prince Hotel	136.7	448	37	1989	
442	Guayaquil	Ecuador	Torre The Point	136.5	448	36	2014	
443	Uberlândia	Brazil	Torre Liber	136.4	448	39	2019	
444 =	Casablanca	Morocco	Casablanca Finance City Tower	136	446	28	2019	
445 =	Chapecó	Brazil	Vila Toscana	136	446	36	2024	
445 =	Liège	Belgium	Tour Paradis	136	446	27	2014	
445 =	Tegucigalpa	Honduras	Atlas	136	446	42	2025	
445 =	Thanh Hóa	Vietnam	Mélia Vinpearl Thanh Hóa	136	446	33	2018	
449	Mandaue	Philippines	Mandani Bay Suites Tower 2	135.9	446	36	2021	
450	Brazzaville	Republic of the Congo	Tours Mpila	135.8	446	31	2023	
451	Iquique	Chile	Mirador Playa Brava Uno	135.7	445	36	2015	
452	Yeosu	South Korea	Woongcheon Xi the Suite 103	135.4	444	42	2022	
453 =	Hsinchu	Taiwan	I.CWC Tower	135.3	444	30	2016	
453 =	Seongnam	South Korea	NAVER Green Factory	135.3	444	28	2010	
455 =	Bandung	Indonesia	Galeri Ciumbuleuit 2 Apartment	135	443	28	2014	
455 =	Leeds	United Kingdom	Cirrus Point	135	443	45	2025	
455 =	Nicosia	Cyprus	360 Nicosia	135	443	34	2020	
455 =	Nuremberg	Germany	Business Tower Nürnberg	135	443	34	2000	
455 =	Rochester, New York	United States	Innovation Square	135	443	30	1968	
455 =	Saratov	Russia	Elena	135	443	36	2015	
461	Kokubunji	Japan	City Tower Kokubunji The Twin - West Block	134.9	443	36	2018	
462 =	Dĩ An	Vietnam	HT Pearl	134.7	442	35	2023	
462 =	Fort Wayne	United States	Indiana Michigan Power Center	134.7	442	27	1982	
464	Moriguchi	Japan	Sunmarks Dainichi Dias Tower Residence G	134.6	441	40	2009	
465 =	Kaminoyama	Japan	Sky Tower 41	134	440	41	1999	
465 =	Okayama	Japan	Morinomachi Grace Okayama The Tower	134	440	37	2021	
465 =	Suita	Japan	Melode Suita	134	440	38	1996	
465 =	Xalapa	Mexico	Centro Mayor Xalapa	134	440	31	2016	
469	The Woodlands	United States	Allison Tower	133.8	439	32	2002	
470	Jaboatão dos Guararapes	Brazil	Barra Home Stay	133.7	439	36	2019	
471 =	Caruaru	Brazil	Cosmopolitan Shopping Park - Park Way	133	436	39	2017	
471 =	Katowice	Poland	KTW II	133	436	31	2022	
471 =	Krasnogorsk	Russia	Art Tower I	133	436	44	2014	
471 =	Quito	Ecuador	IQON	133	436	33	2022	
471 =	Sitiawan	Malaysia	The Venus Residence	133	436	35	2019	
471 =	Thái Nguyên	Vietnam	Thái Nguyên Tower	133	436	35	2021	
477 =	Kōriyama	Japan	Big-i	132.6	435	24	2001	
477 =	New Rochelle	United States	Trump Plaza	132.6	435	32	2007	
479	Ciudad Victoria	Mexico	Torre Bicentenario	132.4	434	25	2010	
480 =	Funabashi	Japan	Park House Presia Tower	132	433	38	2009	
480 =	Kuala Terengganu	Malaysia	Menara MBKT	132	433	30	2019	
480 =	São José dos Campos	Brazil	Pátio das Américas Business and Mall	132	433	30	2014	
483	Khimki	Russia	Mayak 5	131.8	432	42	2019	
484	Helsinki	Finland	Majakka	131.7	432	35	2019	
485	Memphis	United States	100 North Main	131.1	430	37	1965	
486	Kitchener	Canada	DTK Condominiums	130.7	429	39	2022	
487 =	Kanazawa	Japan	Hotel Nikko Kanazawa	130.5	428	30	1994	
487 =	Providence	United States	Industrial National Bank Building	130.5	428	26	1927	
489 =	Beersheba	Israel	M Tower	130	427	32	2020	
489 =	Chihuahua	Mexico	Lumina	130	427	34	2016	
489 =	Khartoum	Sudan	NTC Tower	130	427	29	2009	
489 =	Lajeado	Brazil	São Cristovão	130	427	38	2024	
489 =	Kozhikode	India	Galaxy Magnum Opus	130	427	38	2020	
489 =	Maputo	Mozambique	Banco de Moçambique Tower 1	130	427	31	2016	
489 =	Rio Verde	Brazil	Esplendor du Parc	130	427	43	2023	
489 =	São Bernardo do Campo	Brazil	Domo Business - Torre Office	130	427	38	2010	
489 =	Skopje	North Macedonia	Cevahir Towers	130	427	41	2018	
489 =	Sokcho	South Korea	Sokcho the Ocean Xi 103	130	427	43	2023	
489 =	Vũng Tàu	Vietnam	The Sóng	130	427	36	2022	
500	Tijuana	Mexico	Link Residential	129.6	425	33	2023	
501 =	Kashiwa	Japan	Park City Kashiwanoha Campus The Gate Tower West	129	423	36	2018	
501 =	Naples	Italy	Torre Telecom Italia	129	423	33	1995	
501 =	Santos	Brazil	Unlimited Ocean Front	129	423	37	2016	
501 =	Vilnius	Lithuania	Europa Tower	129	423	33	2004	
505	Sacramento	United States	Wells Fargo Center	128.9	423	30	1992	
506 =	Copenhagen	Denmark	Pasteurs Tårn	128	420	37	2022	
506 =	Latina	Italy	Torre Pontina	128	420	37	2010	
506 =	Tachikawa	Japan	Proud Tower Tachikawa	128	420	32	2016	
509	Córdoba	Argentina	Torres Capitalinas I	127.9	420	37	2019	
510	Clayton	United States	Centene Center	127.7	419	28	2020	
511	Gdynia	Poland	Sea Towers	127.4	418	36	2009	
512 =	Aventura	United States	Hidden Bay I	127.1	417	40	2000	
512 =	Long Beach	United States	Shoreline Gateway	127.1	417	35	2021	
514 =	Bologna	Italy	Unipol Tower	127	417	33	2012	
514 =	Brasília	Brazil	JK Shopping & Tower	127	417	26	2014	
514 =	Essen	Germany	Westenergie-Turm	127	417	30	1996	
514 =	Hamilton	Canada	Landmark Place	127	417	43	1974	
514 =	Jacareí	Brazil	Boulevard Jacareí Office & Mall	127	417	29	2017	
514 =	Santa Cruz de la Sierra	Bolivia	Condominio La Casona	127	417	27	2009	
520	Kumamoto	Japan	The Kumamoto Tower	126.8	416	36	2012	
521	Wonju	South Korea	Health Insurance Review & Assessment Service	126.7	416	27	2015	
522 =	Guttenberg	United States	Galaxy Towers	126.5	415	44	1976	
522 =	Montgomery	United States	RSA Towers	126.5	415	22	1996	
522 =	Quebec City	Canada	Edifice Marie-Guyart	126.5	415	33	1972	
525 =	Atacames	Ecuador	Grand Diamond Beach	126	413	32	2017	
525 =	Delta	Canada	Delta Rise	126	413	37	2017	
525 =	Depok	Indonesia	Evenciio Margonda Depok	126	413	37	2020	
525 =	Itajaí	Brazil	Exclusive Residence	126	413	37	2019	
525 =	Naucalpan	Mexico	Core 31	126	413	36	2022	
525 =	Sibu	Malaysia	Wisma Sanyan	126	413	28	2001	
525 =	Zurich	Switzerland	Prime Tower	126	413	36	2011	
532	Thanh Thủy	Vietnam	Wyndham Lynn Times	125.8	413	35	2022	
533 =	Corpus Christi	United States	One Shoreline Plaza South Tower	125.3	411	28	1988	
533 =	Toledo	United States	One SeaGate	125.3	411	32	1982	
535	Blumenau	Brazil	Residencial Dr. Hermann Blumenau	125.1	410	35	2017	
536 =	Antananarivo	Madagascar	Orange Telecommunication Tower	125	410	33	2013	
536 =	Campina Grande	Brazil	Palazzo Roberto Pinto	125	410	39	2016	
536 =	Lexington	United States	Lexington Financial Center	125	410	30	1987	
536 =	Mar del Plata	Argentina	Edificio Demetrio Eliades	125	410	41	1969	
536 =	Maracay	Venezuela	Sindoni Tower	125	410	32	1999	
536 =	Neyagawa	Japan	The Korien Tower	125	410	37	2010	
536 =	Pristina	Kosovo	Pristina City Center	125	410	32	2025	
536 =	Reno	United States	Silver Legacy Resort & Casino	125	410	38	1995	
536 =	San Salvador	El Salvador	Torre Millennium	125	410	25	2022	
536 =	Shizuoka	Japan	Aoi Tower	125	410	25	2010	
536 =	Szczecin	Poland	Hanza Tower	125	410	28	2020	
547 =	Düsseldorf	Germany	ARAG-Tower	124.9	410	32	2001	
547 =	Zhubei	Taiwan	A+7	124.9	410	32	2015	
549 =	Amagasaki	Japan	Rune Central Tower	124.1	407	36	2003	
549 =	Wando	South Korea	Ssangyong the Platinum Wando	124.1	407	37	2023	
551 =	Port Louis	Mauritius	Bank of Mauritius Building	124	407	22	2006	
551 =	Stockholm	Sweden	Kista Science Tower	124	407	32	2003	
553	Grand Rapids	United States	River House Condominiums	123.8	406	34	2008	
554	Mungyeong	South Korea	Mojeon Koaroo Noble 36	123.7	406	36	2022	
555	Dayton	United States	Stratacache Tower	123.6	405	30	1971	
556	Oakland	United States	Ordway Building	123.1	404	28	1970	
557 =	Acapulco	Mexico	Oceanic 2000	123	404	33	1994	
557 =	Belém	Brazil	Mont Tremblant Residence	123	404	36	2023	
557 =	Cần Thơ	Vietnam	Sheraton Cần Thơ	123	404	30	2016	
557 =	Dnipro	Ukraine	Bashty	123	404	30	2005	
557 =	Dushanbe	Tajikistan	Communications Service Building	123	404	30	2021	
557 =	Jataí	Brazil	Altezza Gran Habitat	123	404	36	2021	
557 =	Joinville	Brazil	Opera	123	404	29	2024	
557 =	Kelowna	Canada	ONE Water Street East Tower	123	404	36	2021	
557 =	Riga	Latvia	Zunda Towers	123	404	30	2017	
557 =	Thiruvananthapuram	India	Nikunjam iPark	123	404	35	2012	
567	Metairie	United States	Three Lakeway Center	122.8	403	34	1987	
568	Gumi	South Korea	Woomi Lynn the Sky 103	122.6	402	41	2015	
569	San Pedro Sula	Honduras	Igvanas Tara Eco City	122.5	402	35	2017	
570	Southfield	United States	Southfield Town Center	122.4	402	32	1975	
571 =	Yangon	Myanmar	Diamond Inya Palace	122	400	34	2019	
571 =	GIFT City	India	GIFT One Tower	122	400	29	2013	
573 =	Riviera Beach	United States	Tiara Condominium	121.9	400	42	1978	
573 =	Springfield, Massachusetts	United States	Monarch Place	121.9	400	26	1989	
575	Kazan	Russia	Azure Skies	121.7	400	37	2013	
576	Bắc Ninh	Vietnam	Vinhomes Bac Ninh SA	121.6	399	31	2018	
577	Izumiōtsu	Japan	Alzar Towers Green Tower	121.5	399	36	1994	
578	Samara	Russia	Vilonovskiy	121.4	399	34	2014	
579 =	Gunsan	South Korea	Gunsan Revenue Stay 102	121.2	398	40	2020	
579 =	Lincoln	United States	Nebraska State Capitol	121.2	398	14	1932	
581	Belo Horizonte	Brazil	Edifício Aureliano Chaves	121.1	397	24	2014	
582 =	Davao City	Philippines	Vivaldi Residences Davao	121	397	36	2023	
582 =	Jerusalem	Israel	Holyland Tower 1	121	397	32	2011	
582 =	Feira de Santana	Brazil	Saint Remy Residence	121	397	36	2024	
582 =	Shimukappu	Japan	Hoshino Resort Tomamu The Tower 2	121	397	36	1989	
586	Kurume	Japan	The Lions Kurume Wellith Tower	120.6	396	35	2010	
587	Toyama	Japan	Tower 111	120.5	395	24	1994	
588	Juiz de Fora	Brazil	Saint Pietro Residence	120.4	395	35	2014	
589 =	Damascus	Syria	Damascus Tower	120.2	394	29	1982	
589 =	Mito	Japan	Ibaraki Prefectural Government Building	120.2	394	25	1999	
591 =	Abidjan	Ivory Coast	La Cité Administrative Tour D	120	394	30	1984	
591 =	Abuja	Nigeria	WTC Tower 2	120	394	25	2016	
591 =	Almere	Netherlands	Carlton	120	394	33	2010	
591 =	Bandar Seri Begawan	Brunei	Ministry of Finance Building	120	394	21	2001	
591 =	Dourados	Brazil	Euro Garden Residence SPA & Resort	120	394	35	2022	
591 =	Fukui	Japan	Fukumachi Block	120	394	27	2024	
591 =	Hanam	South Korea	Misa Station Hyosung Harrington Tower 102	120	394	29	2018	
591 =	Harare	Zimbabwe	New Reserve Bank Tower	120	394	28	1997	
591 =	Herlev	Denmark	Herlev Hospital	120	394	25	1965	
591 =	Kuantan	Malaysia	Swiss-Belhotel Kuantan	120	394	27	2020	
591 =	Offenbach am Main	Germany	City Tower Offenbach	120	394	32	2003	
591 =	Rome	Italy	Torre Eurosky	120	394	35	2012	
591 =	Santa Cruz de Tenerife	Spain	Torre de Santa Cruz I	120	394	35	2004	
591 =	Ulaanbaatar	Mongolia	Shangri-La Wind Valley Wing Hotel	120	394	34	2016	
605	Montville	United States	Mohegan Sun Sky Tower	119.5	392	34	2002	
606	Arlington	United States	Central Place Tower	119.1	391	26	2018	
607	Travemünde	Germany	Maritim Travemünde	119	390	35	1974	
608	A Coruña	Spain	Torre Costa Rica	118.6	389	31	1975	
609	Ghent	Belgium	Artevelde Tower	118.5	389	27	2012	
610 =	Chōfu	Japan	Grand Tower Chofu Kokuryo Le Passage	118.3	388	34	2004	
610 =	Settsu	Japan	Park Tower Minamisenrioka	118.3	388	35	2014	
612	Vila Velha	Brazil	Infinity	118.2	388	36	2024	
613 =	Cesenatico	Italy	Condominio Marinella II	118	387	35	1958	
613 =	Juazeiro do Norte	Brazil	Unique Corporate 1	118	387	26	2017	
613 =	Luxembourg City	Luxembourg	Palais de la Cour de Justice, Tower C	118	387	31	2019	
613 =	Oran	Algeria	Tour Galaxie	118	387	30	2023	
613 =	Reston	United States	2000 Opportunity Way	118	387	28	2021	
613 =	Ribeirão Preto	Brazil	Centro Empresarial Castelo Branco	118	387	27	2011	
619	Sakura	Japan	Skyplaza Station Tower	117.9	387	31	2003	
620 =	Pasadena, Texas	United States	Endeavour	117.7	386	30	2007	
620 =	Toyohashi	Japan	Hotel Nikko Toyohashi	117.7	386	30	1990	
622	Urayasu	Japan	Air Residence Shin-Urayasu Tower WEST	117.2	384	32	2003	
622 =	Akashi	Japan	Proud Tower Akashi	117	384	34	2017	
622 =	Alicante	Spain	Estudiotel Alicante	117	384	35	1962	
622 =	Atsugi	Japan	Atsugi AXT Main Tower	117	384	26	1995	
622 =	Bintulu	Malaysia	The Peak Condominium	117	384	34	2019	
622 =	Campinas	Brazil	Centro Empresarial Conceicao	117	384	31	1996	
622 =	Chungju	South Korea	Chungju Central Prugio 101	117	384	39	2018	
622 =	Gatineau	Canada	Terrasses de la Chaudière I - Central Tower	117	384	30	1978	
622 =	Lille	France	Tour de Lille	117	384	25	1995	
622 =	Oslo	Norway	Radisson Blu Plaza Hotel	117	384	37	1990	
622 =	Tallinn	Estonia	Swissôtel Tallinn	117	384	30	2007	
622 =	Uberaba	Brazil	Manhattan Flat	117	384	31	1994	
622 =	Valencia	Spain	Hilton Valencia	117	384	35	2006	
622 =	Wichita	United States	Epic Center	117	384	22	1989	
622 =	Woking	United Kingdom	Victoria Square	117	384	34	2022	
622 =	Yuzawa	Japan	NASPA Garden Tower	117	384	30	1992	
638	Jinju	South Korea	Sky City Pradium 106	116.8	383	39	2019	
639	New Haven	United States	Connecticut Financial Center	116.7	383	27	1990	
640	Galveston	United States	The Beach Club	116.4	382	27	2007	
640 =	Bloomington	United States	8500 Tower	116.1	381	24	1988	
640 =	Yangju	South Korea	Heecheon Detre Central City 102	116.1	381	38	2022	
640 =	Ponta Grossa	Brazil	Residenziale Vivere Space Home	116	381	34	2023	
640 =	Poznań	Poland	AND2	116	381	25	2026	
640 =	Sochi	Russia	Actor Galaxy	116	381	30	2014	
640 =	Wellington	New Zealand	Majestic Centre	116	381	29	1991	
647	Higashiōsaka	Japan	Higashiosaka City Hall	115.8	380	24	2003	
648	Orange Beach	United States	Turquoise Place East	115.7	380	31	2009	
649 =	Augsburg	Germany	Dorint Hotel Tower	115	377	35	1972	
649 =	Ayia Napa	Cyprus	Ayia Napa Marina East Tower	115	377	26	2022	
649 =	Cagayan de Oro	Philippines	Avida Towers Aspira Tower 2	115	377	33	2023	
649 =	Leeuwarden	Netherlands	Achmeatoren	115	377	25	2002	
653	Yamagata	Japan	Kajo Central	114.7	376	24	2000	
654	West New York	United States	Riviera Towers	114.6	376	37	1966	
655	Chelyabinsk	Russia	Chelyabinsk-City	114.3	375	36	2015	
656 =	Amarillo	United States	FirstBank Southwest Tower	114	374	31	1971	
656 =	Caxias do Sul	Brazil	Edifício Parque do Sol	114	374	36	1976	
656 =	Greensboro	United States	Lincoln Financial Building	114	374	20	1990	
656 =	L'Hospitalet de Llobregat	Spain	Hotel Porta Fira	114	374	23	2010	
660	Tokorozawa	Japan	Forus Tower Tokorozawa	113.6	373	31	2000	
661 =	Everett, Massachusetts	United States	Encore Boston Harbor	113.4	372	24	2019	
661 =	London, Ontario	Canada	One London Place	113.4	372	24	1992	
663	Camden	United States	Camden City Hall	113.1	371	18	1931	
664 =	Canberra	Australia	High Society Tower 1	113	371	27	2020	
664 =	Dübendorf	Switzerland	Three Point Tower E	113	371	38	2024	
664 =	Gombak	Malaysia	Ayuman Suites	113	371	33	2018	
664 =	Islamabad	Pakistan	Telecom Tower	113	371	24	2011	
664 =	Itumbiara	Brazil	Cena Du Valle	113	371	33	2024	
664 =	Novo Hamburgo	Brazil	Mirador Residence	113	371	33	2018	
664 =	Spijkenisse	Netherlands	De Rokade	113	371	28	2010	
671	Tama	Japan	Brillia Tower Seiseki Sakuragaoka Blooming Residence	112.8	370	33	2022	
672 =	Gangneung	South Korea	Yuseung Hannaedeul the First 102	112.5	369	39	2021	
672 =	North Bergen	United States	Stonehenge	112.5	369	34	1967	
672 =	Takarazuka	Japan	Geo Tower Takarazuka Grand Regis	112.5	369	32	2025	
675 =	Chittagong	Bangladesh	Aziz Court Imperial	112	367	29	2017	
675 =	Guatemala City	Guatemala	Altaire	112	367	32	2026	
675 =	Klaipėda	Lithuania	Pilsotas	112	367	34	2007	
675 =	Lomas de Zamora	Argentina	Skyline	112	367	33	2024	
675 =	Manado	Indonesia	Tamansari Lagoon	112	367	28	2015	
675 =	Neuquén	Argentina	Garden Tower Residences - Hilton Garden Inn	112	367	30	2019	
675 =	St. Julian's	Malta	Mercury Tower	112	367	31	2022	
675 =	Suva	Fiji	WG Friendship Plaza Suva	112	367	28	2026	
683	Fujimi	Japan	I'm Tower East Court	111.9	367	31	2005	
684	Málaga	Spain	Torres Martiricos	111.5	366	29	2024	
685	West Palm Beach	United States	One Flagler	111.1	365	26	2025	
686 =	Brno	Czech Republic	AZ Tower	111	364	30	2013	
686 =	Chiang Mai	Thailand	Supalai Monte at Viang Chiangmai	111	364	32	2016	
686 =	Halifax	Canada	One 77	111	364	32	2025	
686 =	Kusatsu	Japan	Leadence Tower Kusatsu	111	364	32	2004	
686 =	Shreveport	United States	Regions Tower	111	364	25	1986	
686 =	Windsor	Canada	Caesars Windsor Augustus Tower	111	364	27	2008	
692	Bailey's Crossroads	United States	One Skyline Tower	110.9	364	26	1998	
693 =	Brescia	Italy	Crystal Palace	110	361	27	1990	
693 =	Corrientes	Argentina	Torre Ribera	110	361	27	2025	
693 =	Encarnación	Paraguay	Shopping Costanera	110	361	20	2023	
693 =	Hamburg	Germany	Elbphilharmonie	110	361	26	2017	
693 =	Lisbon	Portugal	Torre Vasco da Gama	110	361	24	2000	
693 =	Mérida	Mexico	Country Towers Torre Aqua	110	361	30	2014	
693 =	Nishinomiya	Japan	Lapitas 31	110	361	31	2000	
693 =	Pyeongchang	South Korea	Bokwang Phoenix Park Blue	110	361	28	1996	
693 =	Split	Croatia	Dalmatia Tower	110	361	28	2023	
693 =	Tuzla	Bosnia and Herzegovina	Mellain Center	110	361	23	2015	
693 =	Stony Brook	United States	Stony Brook University Hospital	110	360	16	1976	
704	Wilmington	United States	1201 North Market Street	109.8	360	23	1988	
705	Jiaoxi	Taiwan	Kaiyue 3 - Provence	109.7	360	24	2014	
706	Ufa	Russia	Symbol	109.6	360	36	2021	
707	Tsuchiura	Japan	Urala Solid Tower	109.2	358	31	1997	
708	Niagara Falls, New York	United States	Seneca Niagara Casino Tower	109.1	358	26	2006	
709 =	Donetsk	Ukraine	King's Tower	109	358	27	2009	
709 =	Genoa	Italy	Matitone	109	358	26	1992	
709 =	Guarulhos	Brazil	Condominium Parque Clube Torre Bocaina	109	358	32	2011	
709 =	Irving, Texas	United States	Williams Square Central Tower	109	358	26	1985	
709 =	Linz	Austria	Quadrill Tower	109	358	27	2025	
709 =	Makassar	Indonesia	Menara Bosowa	109	358	23	2009	
709 =	Eindhoven	Netherlands	Niko	109	358	36	2025	
709 =	Prague	Czech Republic	City Tower	109	358	27	2008	
709 =	Shiraz	Iran	Chamran Grand Hotel	109	358	30	2011	
718 =	Nishitokyo	Japan	Hibari Tower	108.8	357	33	2009	
718 =	Port of Spain	Trinidad and Tobago	International Waterfront Tower C	108.8	357	27	2008	
718 =	Uyo	Nigeria	Dakkada Towers	108.8	357	21	2020	
721	Durham	United States	University Tower	108.5	356	17	1986	
722 =	Bắc Giang	Vietnam	Mandala Hotel & Suites	108	354	29	2020	
722 =	Kinshasa	Democratic Republic of the Congo	Riverside Towers	108	354	30	2023	
722 =	Muan	South Korea	Jeollanamdo Provincial Government	108	354	23	2005	
722 =	Odesa	Ukraine	Ark Tower	108	354	25	2008	
722 =	Posadas	Argentina	Torre del Cerro	108	354	29	2014	
722 =	Utsunomiya	Japan	Utsunomiya PEAKS	108	354	31	2019	
722 =	Volgograd	Russia	Volzhskie Parusa A	108	354	32	2008	
729	Gwacheon	South Korea	Gwacheon Rio Foret Desian 306	107.7	353	36	2024	
730	Glendale	United States	Glendale Plaza	107.6	353	25	1999	
731	Hwasun	South Korea	Hillstate Hwasun 202	107.2	352	37	2024	
732 =	Albuquerque	United States	Albuquerque Plaza	107	351	22	1990	
732 =	Ponferrada	Spain	Torre de La Rosaleda	107	351	30	2009	
732 =	Porto Alegre	Brazil	Edifício Santa Cruz	107	351	32	1965	
732 =	Rijswijk	Netherlands	European Patent Office	107	351	31	2018	
732 =	Swansea	United Kingdom	The Tower, Meridian Quay	107	351	29	2007	
732 =	Tunja	Colombia	Edificio In Altezza	107	351	30	2016	
738 =	Ashgabat	Turkmenistan	Yyldyz Hotel	106.7	350	24	2013	
738 =	Stamford	United States	Park Tower Stamford	106.7	350	35	2009	
740	Columbia	United States	Capitol Center	106.4	349	25	1987	
741	Toledo, Paraná	Brazil	Residencial Amaranto	106.3	349	32	2021	
742 =	Lahore	Pakistan	Arfa Software Technology Park	106.1	348	17	2010	
742 =	Warabi	Japan	City Tower Warabi	106.1	348	30	2010	
744 =	Bauru	Brazil	Córsega	106	348	31	2017	
744 =	Hải Dương	Vietnam	Lighthouse Ecorivers	106	348	30	2023	
744 =	Mogi das Cruzes	Brazil	Helbor Life Club Patteo Mogilar Torre 1	106	348	31	2017	
744 =	Novosibirsk	Russia	Chicago	106	348	31	2023	
744 =	Passo Fundo	Brazil	Reserva Sangiovese	106	348	31	2022	
744 =	Valparaíso	Chile	Edificio Borde Bahia	106	348	31	2009	
744 =	Zaragoza	Spain	Torre Zaragoza	106	348	30	2021	
744 =	Nagpur	India	Kukreja Infinity	106	348	25	2023	
752	Toucheng	Taiwan	World Bay	105.8	347	29	2017	
753	Troy, Michigan	United States	PNC Center	105.6	346	25	1975	
754	Biloxi	United States	Beau Rivage Casino Hotel	105.5	346	32	1999	
755	Sōka	Japan	Harmoness Tower Matsubara	105.3	345	30	1999	
756	Tempe	United States	West Sixth Tempe Tower 2	105.2	345	30	2011	
757 =	Vishakhapatnam	India	Lansum Oxygen Towers	105	344	35	2017	
757 =	Araçatuba	Brazil	New York Tower	105	344	24	2018	
757 =	Criciúma	Brazil	Edifício Lúcio Cavaler	105	344	27	1981	
757 =	Gaborone	Botswana	iTowers	105	344	30	2016	
757 =	Utrecht	Netherlands	Wonderwoods Vertical Forest	105	344	31	2024	
757 =	Holon	Israel	Krause Tower 1	105	344	30	2018	
757 =	Ibadan	Nigeria	Cocoa House	105	344	26	1965	
757 =	Kamogawa	Japan	Kamogawa Grand Tower	105	344	33	1992	
757 =	Kraków	Poland	K1	105	344	20	1998	
757 =	Kuching	Malaysia	Menara Pelita	105	344	24	1997	
757 =	Minoh	Japan	Brillia Tower Minoo Senba TOP OF THE HILL	105	344	30	2025	
757 =	Vitória	Brazil	Aqva	105	344	33	2013	
769	Naha	Japan	RYU:X Tower	104.8	344	30	2013	
770 =	Longueuil	Canada	Myral Condominiums	104.5	343	34	2026	
770 =	Santiago del Estero	Argentina	Juan Felipe Ibarra Complex	104.5	343	25	2014	
772	Cambridge	United States	M.I.T. Kendall Square Dorm	104.3	342	29	2021	
773	Rochester, Minnesota	United States	Broadway Plaza	104.2	342	29	2004	
774 =	Bethesda	United States	The Wilson	104	341	25	2021	
774 =	El Ejido	Spain	Edificio Torre Laguna	104	341	30	2008	
774 =	Ostend	Belgium	Europacentrum	104	341	35	1969	
777 =	Fort Myers	United States	High Point I	103.9	341	33	2007	
777 =	Harrisburg	United States	333 Market Street	103.9	341	22	1979	
779	Norfolk	United States	Dominion Tower	103.6	340	26	1987	
780	Rittō	Japan	Wing View	103.5	339	31	1999	
781	Santo André	Brazil	Century Plaza Business	103.3	339	30	2016	
782 =	Alexandria	United States	Hilton Alexandria Mark Center	103	338	30	1985	
782 =	Athens	Greece	Athens Tower 1	103	338	28	1971	
782 =	Brampton	Canada	Story of Brampton Central	103	338	31	2022	
782 =	Gyeongsan	South Korea	Hayang Jeil Pungkyeongchae Urbanity	103	338	35	2024	
782 =	Khabarovsk	Russia	New Quarter Business Center	103	338	27	2025	
782 =	Phủ Lý	Vietnam	Melia Vinpearl Phu Ly	103	338	27	2018	
782 =	Plovdiv	Bulgaria	Park Sankt Petersburg Hotel	103	338	30	1981	
782 =	Semarang	Indonesia	Best Western Star Hotel & Star Apartment Semarang	103	338	26	2013	
782 =	Taboão da Serra	Brazil	Eco's Natureza Clube Torre 1	103	338	30	2011	
791	Samcheok	South Korea	e-Pyeonhansesang Samcheok Gyo-dong 108	102.8	337	35	2018	
792	Barnaul	Russia	Stolichnyy	102.6	337	23	2020	
793	Takasaki	Japan	Takasaki City Hall	102.5	336	21	1993	
794	Plano	United States	LVL 29	102.4	336	29	2019	
795 =	Brighton	United Kingdom	Sussex Heights	102	335	24	1968	
795 =	Lomé	Togo	Hotel 2 Fevrier Lomé	102	335	36	1980	
795 =	Mannheim	Germany	Collini Center	102	335	32	1975	
795 =	Villajoyosa	Spain	Atrium Beach Mar	102	335	28	2002	
795 =	Zenica	Bosnia and Herzegovina	Lamela	102	335	27	1976	
800 =	Fukuyama	Japan	Florence Fukuyama Rose Tower	101.7	334	28	2011	
800 =	Imabari	Japan	Imabari Kokusai Hotel	101.7	334	22	1996	
800 =	Õita	Japan	Hotel Nikko Oita OasisTower	101.7	334	21	1999	
803	Rimini	Italy	Grattacielo di Rimini	101.5	333	29	1959	
804	Yachiyo	Japan	Park Tower Yachiyo Midorigaoka	101.3	332	31	2012	
805	South Bend	United States	Chase Tower	101.2	332	25	1971	
806 =	Anápolis	Brazil	Genesis Office	101	331	23	2022	
806 =	Cabazon	United States	Morongo Casino Tower	101	331	27	2004	
806 =	Enschede	Netherlands	Alphatoren	101	331	28	2008	
806 =	Foz do Iguaçu	Brazil	Torre Marechal Centro Empresarial	101	331	23	2019	
806 =	Imperatriz	Brazil	Aracati Office	101	331	23	2014	
806 =	Kabul	Afghanistan	Mohib Towers	101	331	28	2021	
806 =	Kampala	Uganda	Uganda Revenue Authority Headquarters	101	331	23	2019	
806 =	Los Barrios	Spain	Torres de Hercules	101	331	21	2009	
806 =	Ostermundigen	Switzerland	BäreTower	101	331	33	2022	
806 =	Petrolina	Brazil	Trade Center Dom Campelo	101	331	23	2024	
806 =	's-Hertogenbosch	Netherlands	Provinciehuis Noord Brabant	101	331	23	1971	
806 =	Sheffield	United Kingdom	St Paul's Tower	101	331	32	2010	
806 =	Surat	India	Casa Rivera	101	331	24	2021	
806 =	Timmendorfer Strand	Germany	Maritim Clubhotel	101	331	32	1973	
806 =	Tuy Hòa	Vietnam	Apec Mandala Wyndham Phú Yên	101	331	27	2022	
821	Miryang	South Korea	e-Pyeonhansesang Miryang Sammun 101	100.9	331	35	2018	
822	Jecheon	South Korea	Sinan Silk Valley Sky City 106	100.8	331	36	2017	
823 =	Antwerp	Belgium	Antwerp Tower	100.7	330	27	1974	
823 =	Nakhon Ratchasima	Thailand	Plus Condo Korat	100.7	330	30	2021	
825 =	Akron	United States	Huntington Tower	100.6	330	27	1931	
825 =	Daytona Beach	United States	Daytona Grande Oceanfront Hotel	100.6	330	26	2021	
825 =	Kyoto	Japan	NIDEC Corporation Headquarters Building	100.6	330	22	2003	
825 =	Midland	United States	Bank of America Building	100.6	330	24	1976	
825 =	Tucson	United States	One South Church	100.6	330	23	1986	
830	Fuchū	Japan	Grand-Tower Fuchu La Avenu	100.2	329	28	2005	
831 =	Cascavel	Brazil	Edifício Abraham Lincoln	100	328	27	2018	
831 =	Conakry	Guinea	Kakimbo Towers	100	328	28	2018	
831 =	Kanpur	India	Emerald Garden Iconic Tower	100	328	27	2018	
831 =	Darwin	Australia	Evolution on Gardiner	100	328	33	2008	
831 =	Đồng Hới	Vietnam	Dolce Penisola	100	328	29	2023	
831 =	Francisco Beltrão	Brazil	Edifício Visor	100	328	29	2020	
831 =	Ipoh	Malaysia	The Haven Resort	100	328	26	2013	
831 =	Kagoshima	Japan	Kagoshima Chuo Tower	100	328	24	2021	
831 =	Kōchi	Japan	Top One Shikoku	100	328	29	1993	
831 =	Malé	Maldives	Dharumavantha Hospital	100	328	25	2018	
831 =	Mogadishu	Somalia	Dahab Tower	100	328	25	2026	
831 =	Mulhouse	France	Tour de l`Europe	100	328	31	1972	
831 =	Myrtle Beach	United States	Margate Tower	100	328	29	2004	
831 =	Oeiras	Portugal	Monsanto Tower	100	328	17	2000	
831 =	Sandakan	Malaysia	Four Points by Sheraton Sandakan	100	328	26	2012	
831 =	Thane	India	Whitefield	100	328	27	2008	
831 =	Tuxtla Gutiérrez	Mexico	Ka'An Luxury Towers	100	328	28	2015	

== See also ==
- List of cities with the most skyscrapers
- List of supertall skyscrapers
- List of tallest buildings
- List of tallest buildings by country
