= List of tallest buildings in Darwin =

Tall buildings in Darwin
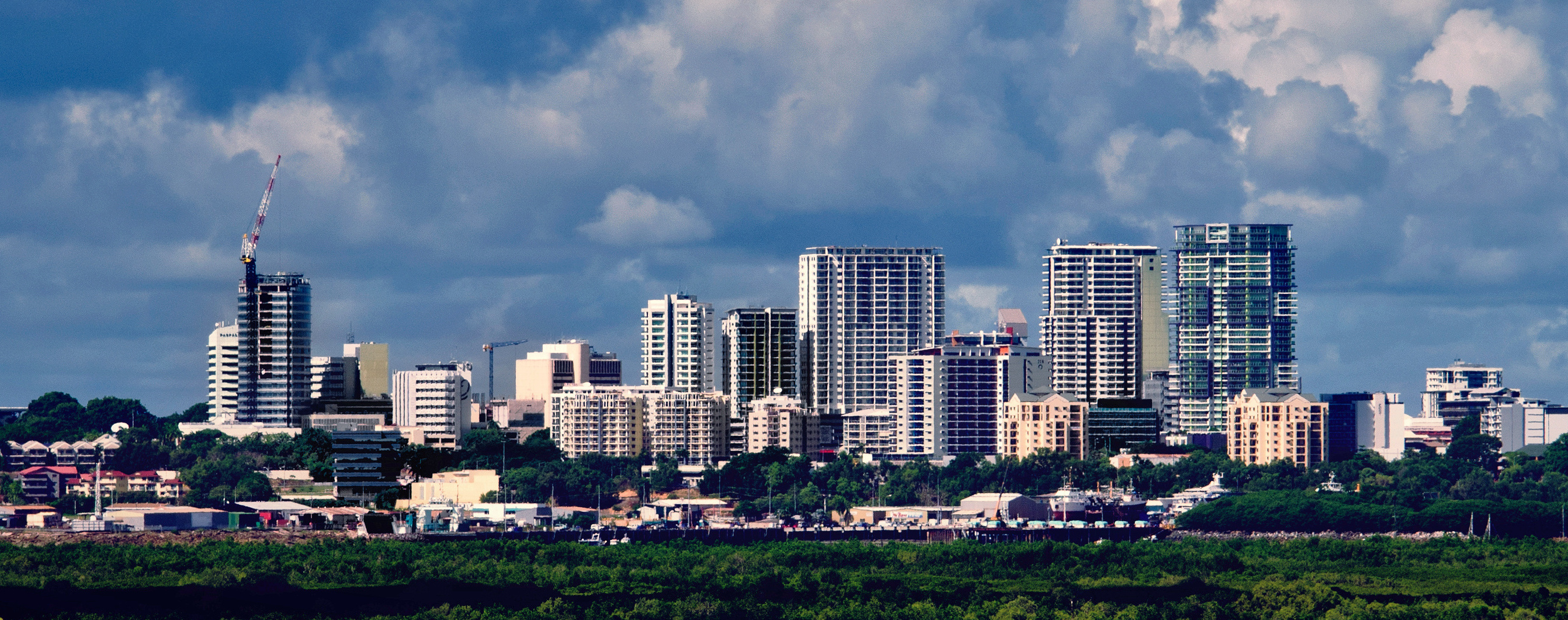
- Skyline of Darwin in 2015
- Tallest building: Evolution on Gardiner (2008)
- Tallest building height: 100 m (328 ft)

Number of tall buildings
- Taller than 50 m (164 ft): 10 (2025)
- Taller than 100 m (328 ft): 1

This list of tallest buildings in Darwin ranks buildings in the city of Darwin, Australia by height to the highest architectural detail. This ranking system, created by the US-based Council on Tall Buildings and Urban Habitat includes the height to a spire but not to an antenna. The tallest building in Darwin is the 33-storey Evolution on Gardiner at 99 m (325 ft), completed in 2008. It also stands as the tallest building in Northern Territory. Currently, Chinatown Tower is on hold at 86 m (282 ft) and 25 floors.

== Tallest buildings ==
Name		Image	Height	Floors	Built	Purpose
1	Evolution on Gardiner		100 m (328 ft)	33	2008	Residential
2	Mantra Pandanas		91 m (299 ft)	29	2007	Residential
3	Soho Apartments		90 m (295 ft)	28	2014	Residential
4	Charles Darwin Centre		83 m (272 ft)	22	2015	Office
5	Skytower Apartments		70 m (230 ft)	21	2010	Residential
6	6 Carey Street, Zen Quarter		61 m (200 ft)	16	2014	Residential
7	Marrakai Apartments		58 m (190 ft)	16	1984	Residential
8	Mitchell Centre		57 m (187 ft)	17	2004	Office
9	Northern Territory House		55 m (180 ft)	15	1993	Office
10	H105 Mitchell		52 m (171 ft)	16	2015	Hotel
11	Hilton Hotel		50 m (164 ft)	14	1995	Hotel
12	Pinnacle Apartments		48 m (157 ft)	15	2008	Residential
13	Territory Insurance Building		45 m (148 ft)	12	2003	Office
14	Tech-1		41 m (135 ft)	13	2016	Residential
15	Doubletree by Hilton		36 m (118 ft)	11	1973	Hotel
16	Synergy Square Tower 1		35 m (115 ft)	11	2006	Residential

== Projects ==
This is a list of the tallest buildings under construction or approved.

Name (Street address)	Height (m)	Floors	Completion	Use	Status
84 Mitchell Street	133 m (436 ft)	38		Hotel	Approved
Chinatown Tower	86 m (282 ft)	25		Residential	On-hold
Civic Centre	80 m (262 ft)	20		Office	Under construction

== See also ==
- List of tallest buildings in Australia
- List of tallest buildings in Oceania
