= Lighthouse Tower Bat Yam =

Skyscrpaer in Bat Yam, Israel

Lighthouse Tower
- מגדל לייטהאוס (Hebrew)
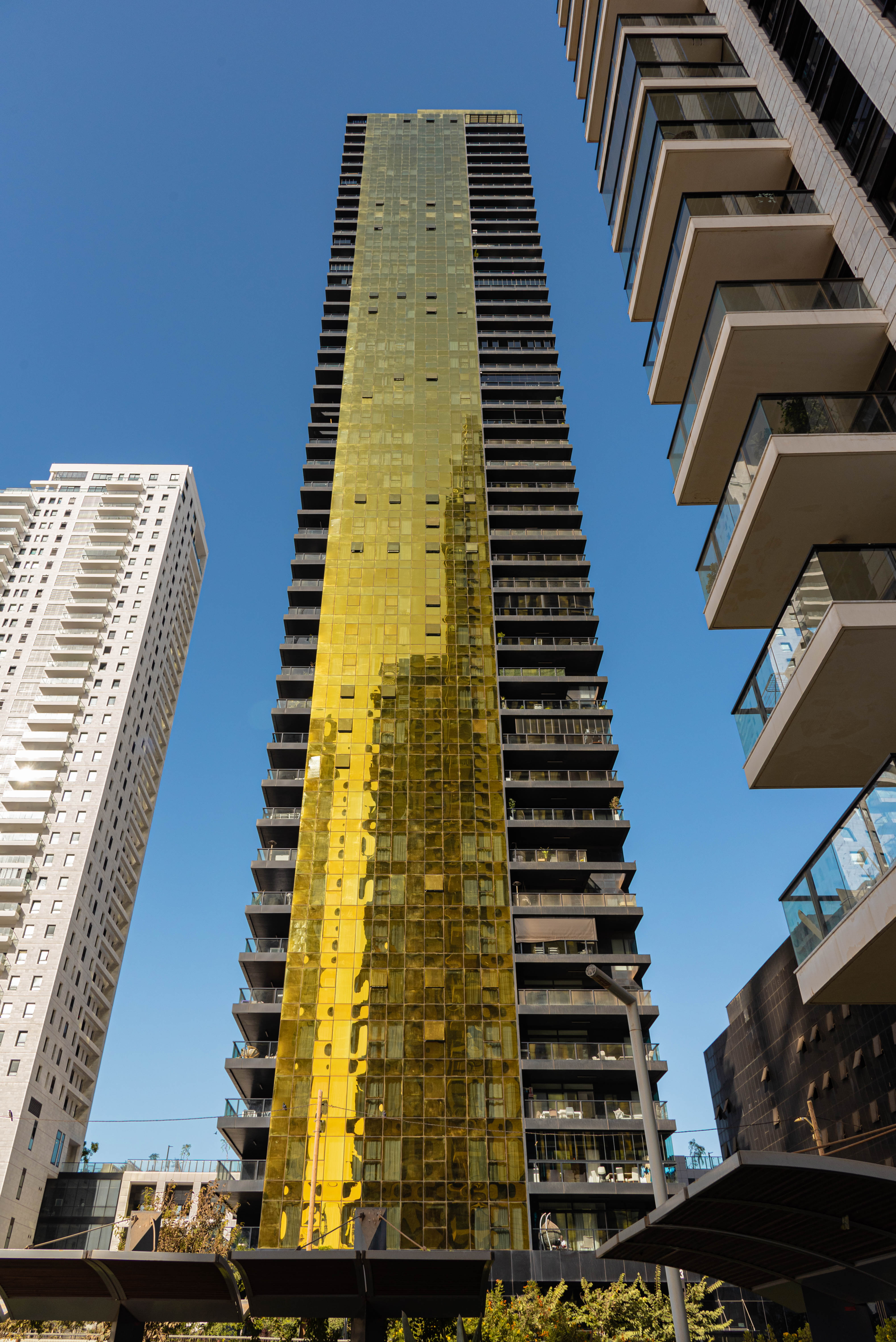
- Interactive map of the Lighthouse Tower area

General information
- Status: Completed
- Type: Residential
- Location: Bat Yam, Israel, 4 Yohanan HaSandlar St., Bat Yam, Israel
- Coordinates: 32.00540°N 34.74192°E
- Construction started: 2016
- Completed: 2021

Height
- Roof: 163.7 m (537 ft)

Technical details
- Structural system: Concrete
- Floor count: 49

Design and construction
- Architect: Ilan Pivko

The Lighthouse Tower (Hebrew: מגדל לייטהאוס) (also known as the YBOX or the Golden Tower) is a residential skyscraper in the Tel Aviv District city of Bat Yam, Israel. Built between 2016 and 2021, the tower stands at 163.7 m (537 ft) tall with 49 floors and is the current 22nd tallest building in Israel.

== History ==
=== Architecture ===
Its construction of the project was completed in 2021. The tower's official height is of 163.7 meters tall. And it has 49 floors. The building is located in the Sea Park neighborhood, a skyscraper neighborhood in Bat Yam, and is the second tallest building in Bat Yam, after the Eden Tower, which is adjacent to it and is 4.75 meters taller. The building houses a total of 225 residential units. The Vision Tower was built next to it.

The building rises to a height of 163.7 meters and has 49 floors - a double lobby floor that also includes a gallery floor, 46 residential floors with 194 apartments, a gallery floor and a technical floor at the top of the building, is the second tallest in Bat Yam and the 21st tallest building in Israel. The building is covered with gold cladding and causes reflection. Each apartment in the building has a view of the sea, which is about 500 meters from the building.

Its distinctive trait is its "golden" fenestration with curtain wall glazing that acts as a filter, resulting in a striking golden tint. The project's construction commenced in 2016 and is a key element of the Park Hayam neighborhood development initiative, which involves enhancing the coastal zone around the building by establishing parks, restaurants, cafes, and bars. The external surroundings of the building are undergoing considerable enhancement, with the city of Bat Yam planning extensive green parks directly in front of the tower.

== See also ==
- List of tallest buildings in Israel
- Ilan Pivko
