= Modern Media Center =

Supertall skyscraper in Changzhou, China

- 现代传煤中心
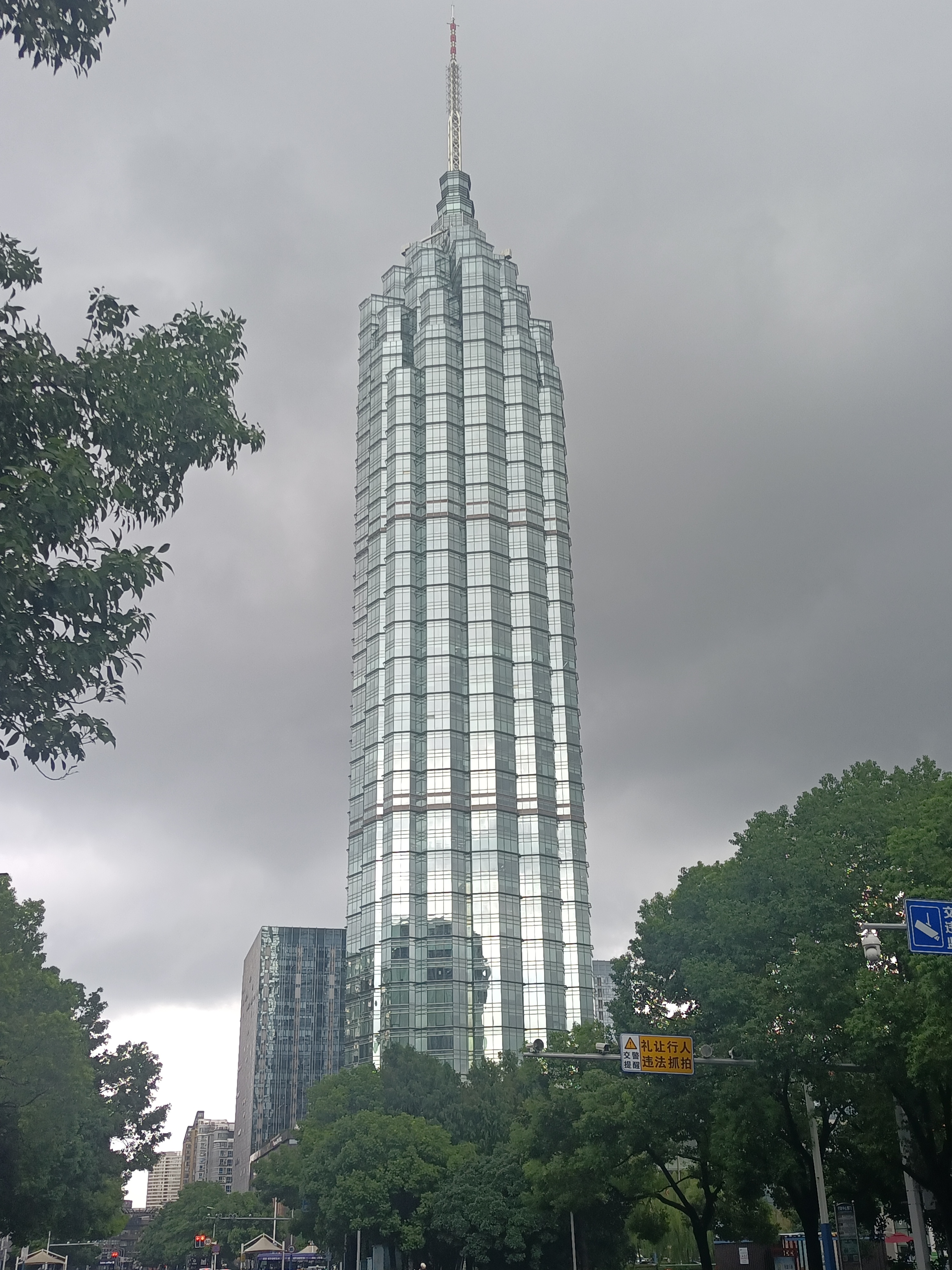
- Modern Media Center in September 2024
- Interactive map of the Modern Media Center area

General information
- Status: Completed
- Type: Mixed-use
- Location: Changzhou, China
- Coordinates: 31°48′50.0″N 119°58′20.1″E
- Construction started: 2010
- Completed: August 2013
- Owner: Changzhou Broadcasting Station

Height
- Architectural: 333 m (1,093 ft)
- Tip: 333 m (1,093 ft)
- Roof: 265.1 m (870 ft)
- Top floor: 225.1 m (739 ft)

Technical details
- Floor count: 58 (+ 3 below ground)
- Floor area: 89,767 m^{2} (966,244 sq ft)
- Lifts/elevators: 21

Design and construction
- Architecture firm: Shanghai Institute of Architectural Design & Research
- Developer: Changzhou Radio and TV Realty Company Ltd.
- Main contractor: China Construction Third Engineering Bureau Co., Ltd.

The Modern Media Center (Chinese: 现代传煤中心) is a 58-story, 333 m (1,093 ft) mixed-use supertall skyscraper located in Changzhou, China. As the tallest building in the city, the skyscraper serves as a prominent landmark. Construction of the project began in 2010, and it was officially completed in August 2013.

The building's architectural design is notably inspired by the traditional Tianning Pagoda. The building is owned by the Changzhou Broadcasting Station and was developed by the Changzhou Radio and TV Realty Company Ltd. Its technical specifications include 58 floors above ground and 3 floors below ground, with a total floor area of 89,767 m^{2} (966,244 sq ft). The main contractor for the project was the China Construction Third Engineering Bureau Co., Ltd.

== History ==
The project was officially proposed in 2008 as a centerpiece for the development of media infrastructure in the city. Following the planning phase, construction of the supertall skyscraper began in 2010.

The architectural design of the skyscraper was inspired by the aesthetic of the nearby Tianning Pagoda, a cultural landmark in Changzhou, which helped integrate the modern skyscraper into the local historical landscape. Upon its completion, the building surpassed the 228 m (748 ft) tall Kaina Business Plaza to become the tallest building in Changzhou.

After three years of intensive construction, the building was completed in August 2013. The project functions as a mixed-use facility, housing broadcasting operations and commercial spaces, including the Changzhou Marriott Hotel, which occupies a portion of the tower.

== Gallery ==
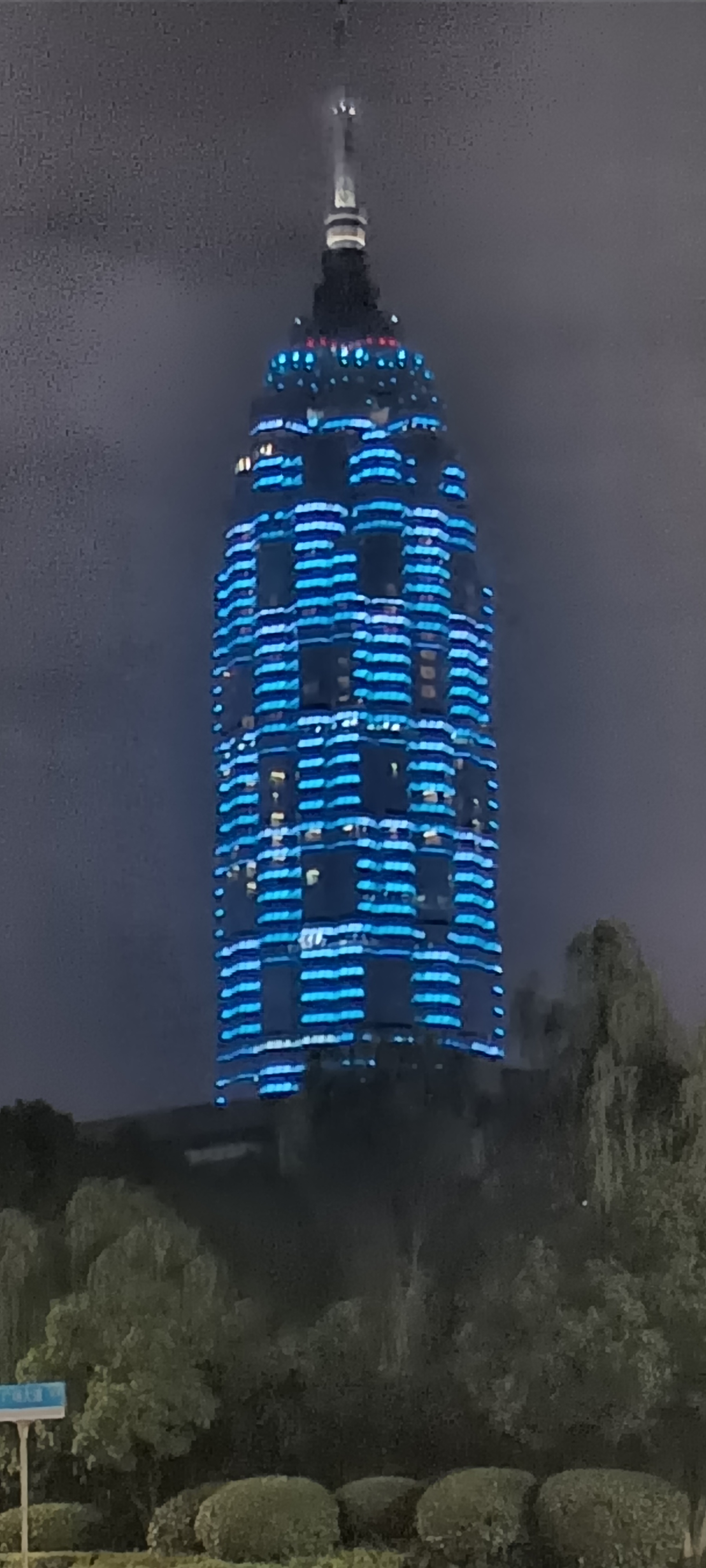
Modern Media Center at night

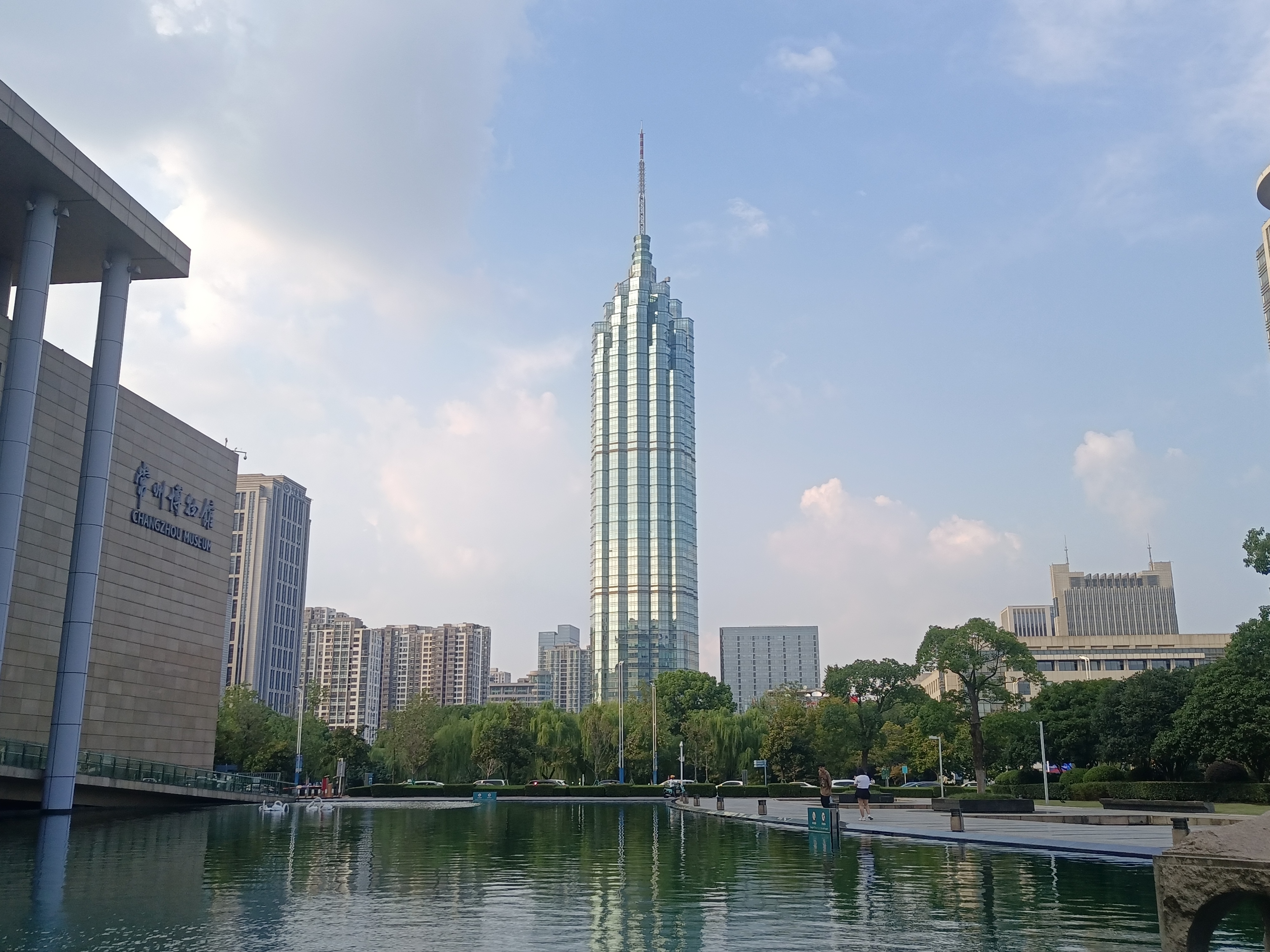
Modern Media Center viewed from the Changzhou Museum

== See also ==
- List of tallest buildings in Changzhou
- List of tallest buildings in China
- List of tallest buildings by city
- List of supertall skyscrapers
