= Nantong Zhongnan International Plaza =

Skyscraper in Nantong, Jiangsu, China

Coordinates: 31.9761°N 120.8939°E

- Interactive map of the Nantong Zhongnan International Plaza area

General information
- Location: Nantong, China
- Construction started: 2008
- Completed: 2011

Height
- Architectural: 273.3 m (897 ft)
- Tip: 273.3 m (897 ft)

Technical details
- Floor count: 55

Nantong Zhongnan International Plaza is a skyscraper in Chongchuan District, Nantong, Jiangsu, China. It has a height of 273.3 metres (897 ft). Construction began in 2008 and finished in 2011.
