= Eden Tower =

Skyscrpaer in Bat Yam, Israel

- מגדל עדן (Hebrew)
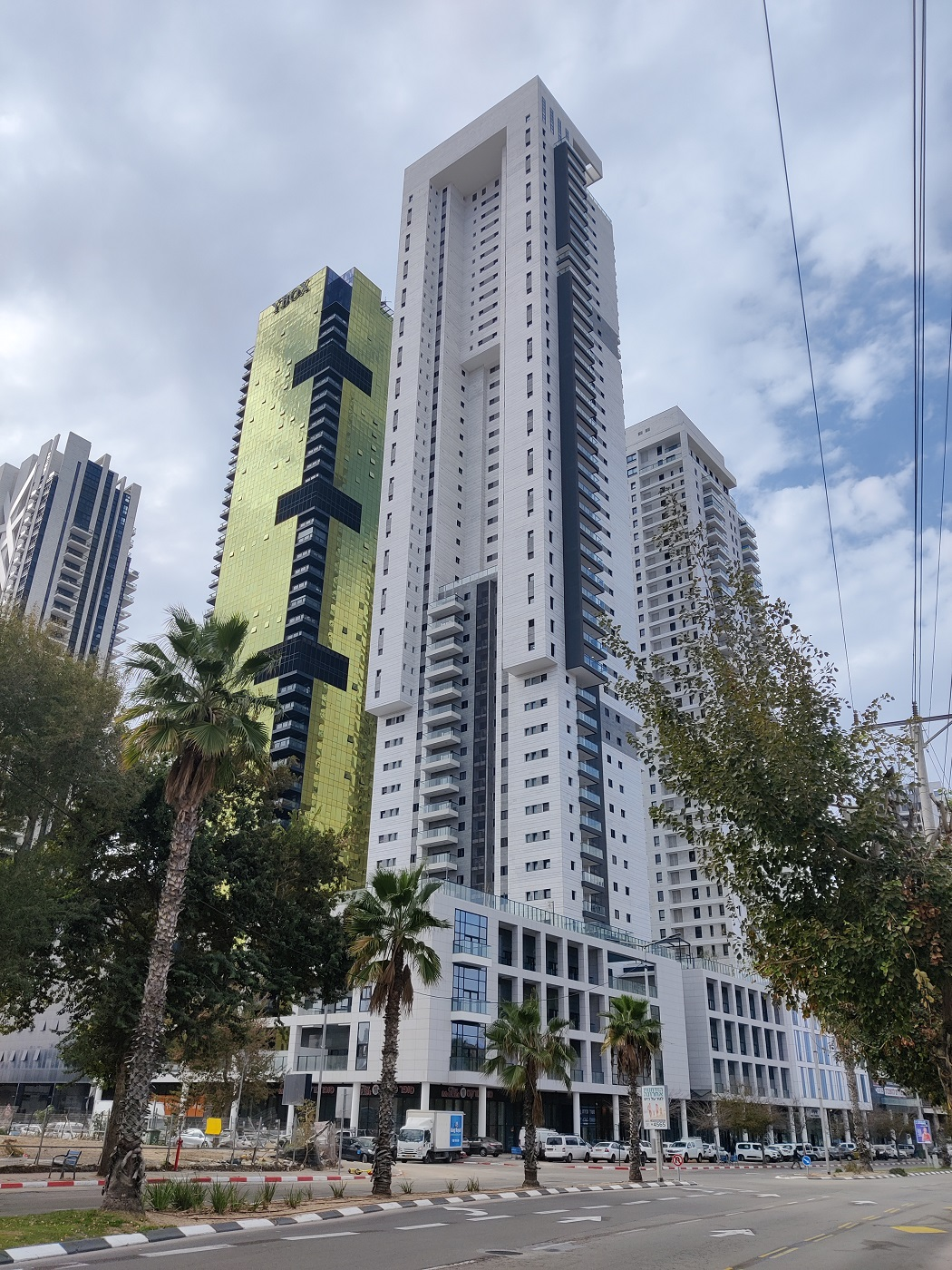

General information
- Status: Completed
- Type: Residential
- Location: Bat Yam, Tel Aviv District, Israel, 2 Yohanan HaSandlar St., Bat Yam, Israel
- Coordinates: 32.00603°N 34.74212°E
- Construction started: 2020
- Completed: 2022

Height
- Roof: 168.5 m (553 ft)

Technical details
- Structural system: Concrete
- Floor count: 47 (+3 underground)

Design and construction
- Architect: Dov Koren Architects
- Developer: Hammi Ezra Group; Shlomot Construction
- Main contractor: Levinstein Nativ Engineering & Building

Website
- Eden Tower

The Eden Tower (Hebrew: מגדל עדן) is a residential skyscraper in the Tel Aviv District city of Bat Yam, Israel. Built between 2020 and 2022, the tower stands at 168.5 m (553 ft) with 47 floors and is the current 17th tallest building in Israel.

== History ==
=== Architecture ===
The building rises to a height of 168.45 meters and has 48 upper floors and 3 basement parking floors, a commercial floor, 3 hotel floors, and 41 residential floors including 177 rentable housing units. The building is about 500 meters from Bat Yam Beach, next to the Lighthouse Tower. The first 5 floors of the building are allocated to the commercial function on the first floor with the next four levels serving as a boutique hotel.

In early 2017, Eldar Investments has received excavation and embankment permits from the Bat Yam Municipality for the project in the Park Yam neighborhood. In June 2017, the site groundbreaking took place. The main development company has formed a purchasing group that will purchase the land from Shlomot Construction Company, a construction company owned by Ezra Hammi, for about NIS 135 million.

The Eden Tower project appeals to both real estate investors and residential buyers. The new Sea Park neighborhood is located right on the Bat Yam coastline and is considered one of the most attractive residential neighborhoods in the city. The project is financed by Bank Leumi, with tennants receiving mortgage from the bank. Payments were guaranteed in accordance with the Investment Guarantee Sale Law.

== See also ==
- List of tallest buildings in Israel
