= Hyatt Regency Andares Zapopan =

Skyscraper in Guadalajara, Jalisco

Hyatt Regency Andares
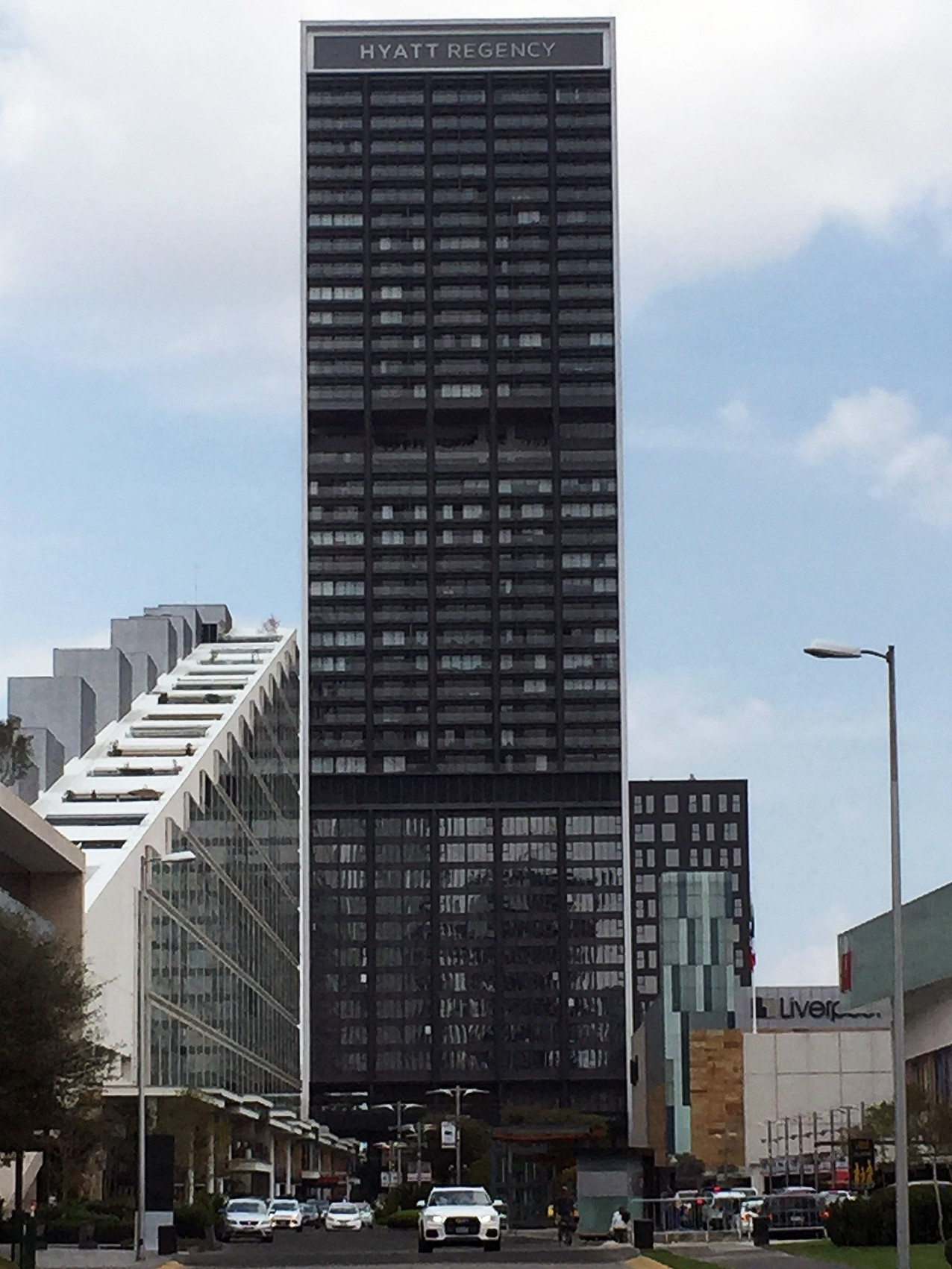
- Interactive map of the Hyatt Regency Andares area

General information
- Status: Completed
- Type: Mixed-use: Hotel / Residential
- Location: Zapopan, Guadalajara, Jalisco, 5065 Blvrd Puerta de Hierro, Zapopan, Jalisco, Mexico
- Coordinates: 20.71282°N 103.41230°W
- Construction started: 2014
- Completed: 2017
- Owner: Hyatt Hotels Corporation

Height
- Roof: 173 m (568 ft)

Technical details
- Structural system: Reinforced concrete
- Floor count: 41
- Floor area: 53,510 m^{2} (576,000 sq ft)

Design and construction
- Architect: Sordo Madaleno Arquitectos
- Structural engineer: Raúl Izquierdo; AHSA Ingeniería
- Main contractor: Anteus Constructora

Website
- Metropolitan Center

The Hyatt Regency Andares is a mixed-use skyscraper in Zapopan, municipality of Guadalajara, Jalisco. Built between 2014 and 2017, the tower stands at 173 m (568 ft) tall with 41 floors and is the current 25th tallest building in Mexico.

== History ==
=== Architecture ===
The tower was designed by the Mexican firm Sordo Madaleno Arquitectos and is located in the Zapopan district of Guadalajara. It is part of an urban developmental plan elaborated in 2009 in order to create a new center for the Puerta de Hierro neighborhood. The original project also provided the construction of a shopping mall, a hotel and luxury apartment buildings with a total of 70,000 m^{2} (753,000 sq ft) of usable area.

The tower provides a visual and spatial setting for the interior street of Paseo Andares Boulevard, a road designed to accommodate the various functions of the complex and align with the city's urban layout. The structure goes up to a height of 41 stories from the street. The first level includes a public plaza with trees that is linked to the interior street and serves as a connector for the motor lobby. The building houses a total of 225 rentable apartment units.

The tower is split into sections: the hotel is located on the bottom 12 floors while the residential apartments are on the upper 28 floors, each having its own amenities. Floor 13 is designated for the exchange of services and facilities utilized by both types of use.

The building received its LEED Golden Certificate on October 24, 2019.

== See also ==
- List of tallest buildings in Mexico
- List of tallest buildings in Latin America
