= Riverside Century Plaza Main Tower =

Skyscraper in Wuhu, Anhui, China

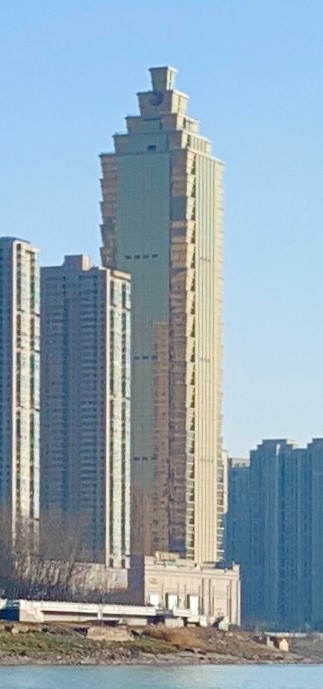
- Interactive map of the Riverside Century Plaza Main Tower area

General information
- Status: Completed
- Location: Wuhu, Anhui, China
- Coordinates: 31.3174°N 118.3603°E
- Construction started: 2011
- Completed: 2015

Height
- Architectural: 275 metres (902.2 ft)

Technical details
- Floor count: 66

Riverside Century Plaza Main Tower is a 66-story, 275-metre (902 ft) skyscraper in Wuhu, Anhui, China. Completed in 2015, it is the tallest building in Wuhu.

== See also ==
- List of tallest buildings in China
