= Artevelde Tower =

Office building in Ghent, Belgium

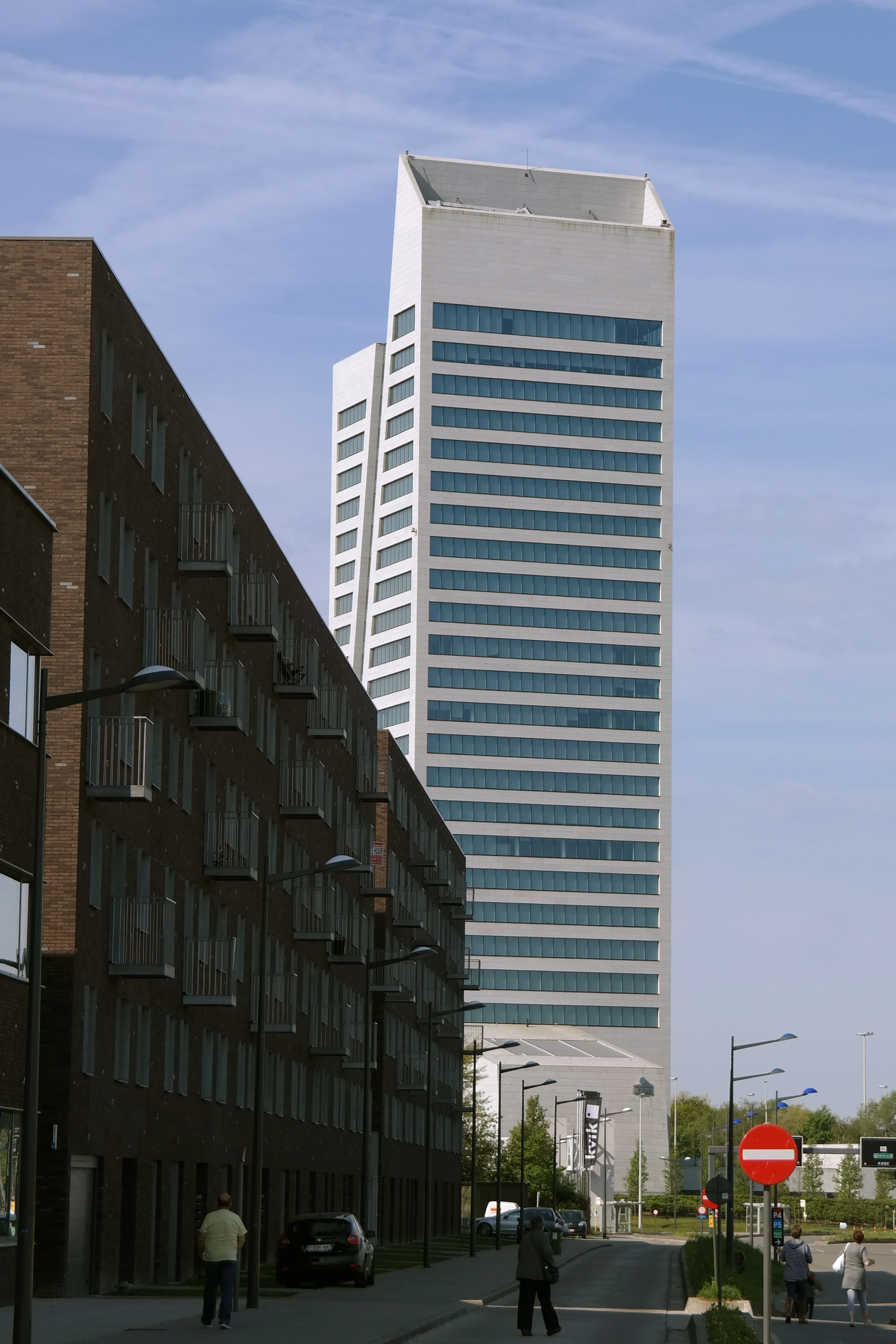
Artevelde Tower

The Artevelde Tower (official Dutch name: KBC Arteveldetoren) is an office building in Ghent, Belgium. The tower is 118.5 metres and the highest building of Ghent and the highest office in the Flemish Region. It hosts the regional headquarters of a bank-insurer KBC. The groundbreaking was held in March 2010, and the highest point was reached at the beginning of July 2011. The building was officially inaugurated on 20 April 2012.

== Name ==
The project developer gave the building the (temporary) name MG-toren. These letters refer to the initials of the first names of his children, Margaux and Guillaume. In December 2010, the tower received its official name KBC Arteveldetoren. The first part of the name refers to KBC, and the other part to the historical Ghent figure of Jacob van Artevelde. This name is the result of a staff decision.

== Offices ==
The Artevelde Tower is the symbolic entrance to the new city project called "The Loop", which aims to transform the site of the former Sint-Denijs-Westrem Airfield into a vibrant urban district. The tower is located at the Ghent municipality of Sint-Denijs-Westrem, near the exit of the E40, the B402, the N43, and the convention center Flanders Expo.

The contractors were the PLC Stasimo and De Paepe group, and the architects were Jaspers-Eyers & Partners from Brussels. The tower is 118.5 metres high and has 27 floors, which translates into 20,800 square metres of office space. Bank-insurer KBC centralises its services previously scattered around Ghent: Kouterdreef, Kortrijksesteenweg, Bellevue, Zuiderpoort and the education center of Merelbeke. The office at the Kouter (town square of Ghent) remains open.
