= Seljuk Tower =

Coordinates: 37.8888°N 32.4941°E

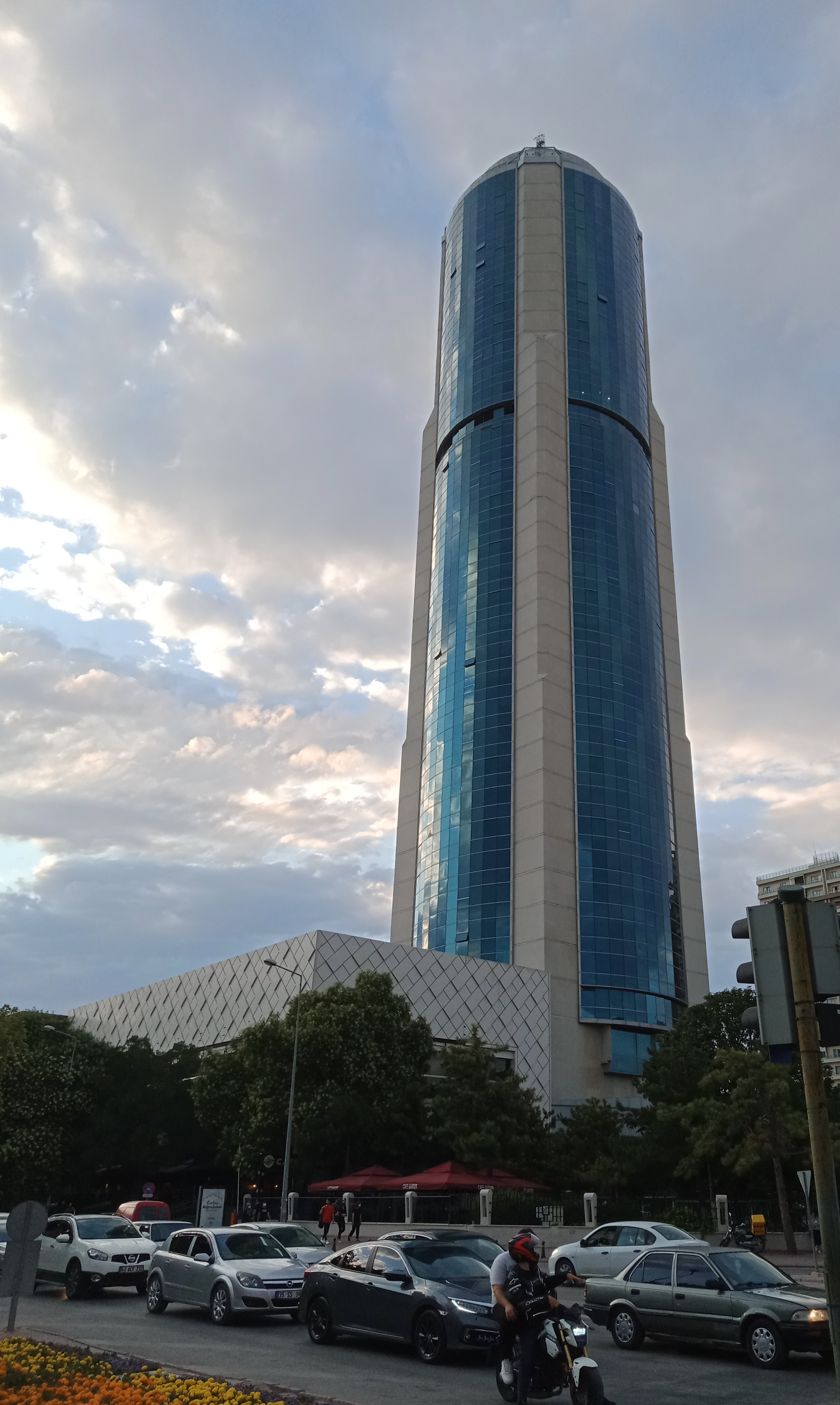
- Interactive map of the Seljuk Tower area

General information
- Status: Completed
- Type: Business
- Location: Konya, Turkey

The 42-floor Seljuk Tower (Turkish: Selçuklu Kulesi) is a skyscraper within the Konya Trade Center (Turkish: Konya Ticaret Merkezi, also known as Kulesite) business and shopping center in Konya, Turkey. At the time of its completion in 2006, it was the 11th-tallest skyscraper in Turkey and the tallest in Konya and the Central Anatolia Region.

The tower's official height is 163 m (535 ft) and has 42 floors above ground level. The top 2 floors are a revolving restaurant which rotates once in an hour, or 24 times in a day, offering panoramic views of the city.

Number 42 is the licence plate number for Konya, which was the reason for constructing 42 floors above ground level.

Kulesite AVM shopping mall is adjacent to the tower.
