= Outrigger Pandanas =

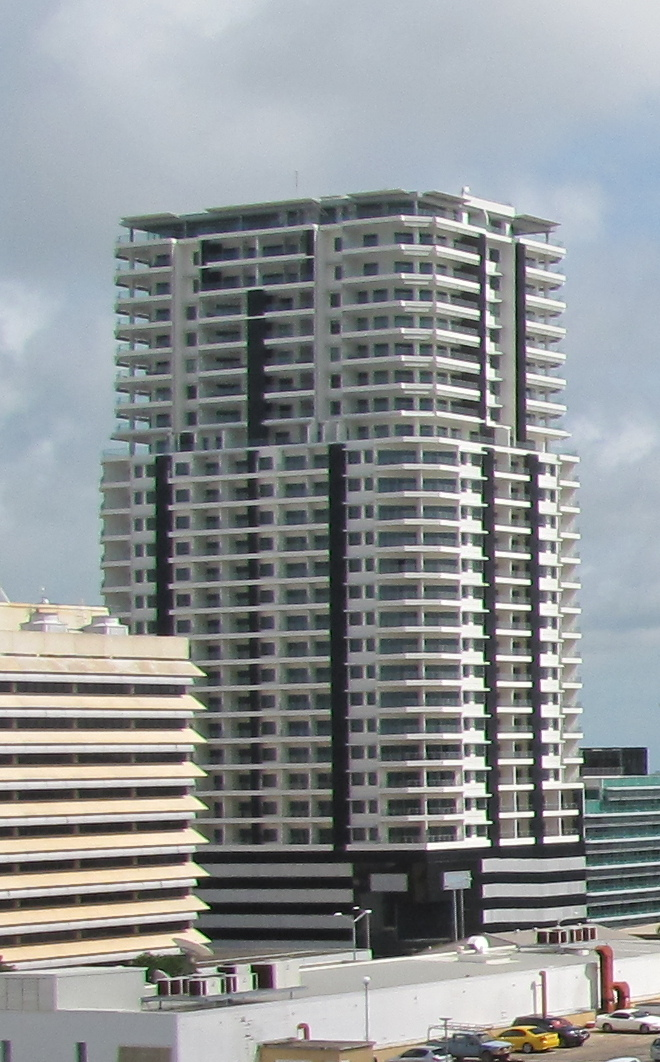
- Outrigger Pandanas in 2010

- Location within Northern Territory

General information
- Type: mixed
- Location: Darwin City, Northern Territory, Australia
- Coordinates: 12.461197°S 130.843059°E
- Construction started: 2006
- Completed: 2007

Height
- Roof: 91 m (299 ft)

Technical details
- Floor count: 29
- Floor area: 1,938 m^{2} (20,860 sq ft)

Design and construction
- Architect: Woodhead
- Main contractor: Gwelo Investments Pty Ltd

Outrigger Pandanas is the second-tallest building in Darwin. It is at 43 Knuckey Street, in the eastern side of the Darwin central business district. Built from 2006 to 2007 with the Pandanas Office Suite being completed by 2009, its roof is 91 m (299 ft) above ground. It comprises 29 levels of mixed use for residential and commercial.\

The building is currently managed by the Saville Hotel Group which manages more than 150 resorts, hotels and apartments across Australia and New Zealand. Stage 1 of the Pandanas office suite is currently under construction by Gwelo Investments Pty Ltd. Development will comprise with 4,000 square metres (43,000 sq ft) of office space over six levels together with the ground floor retail area.
