= Ilan Pivko =

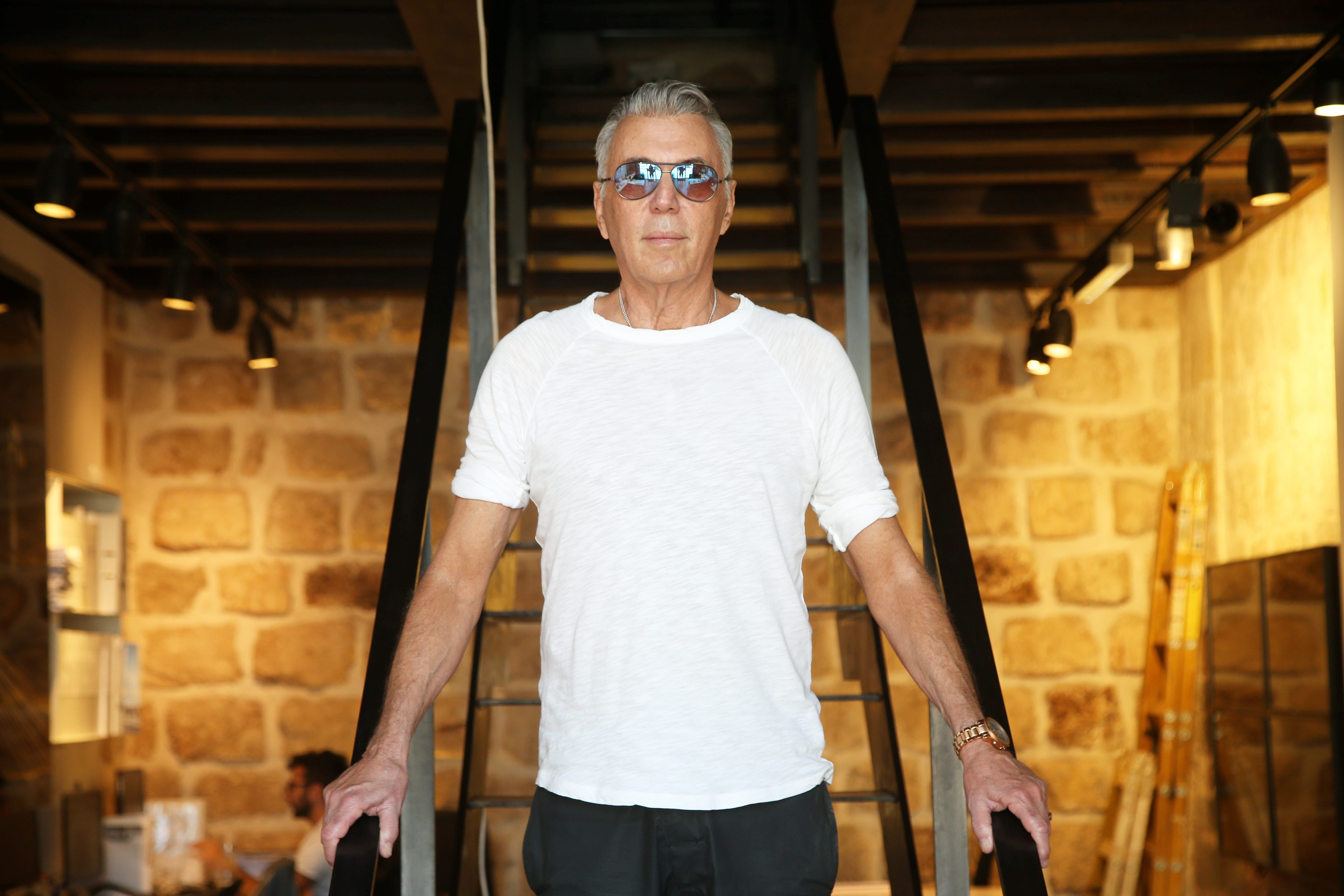
Image of אילן פיבקו Ilan Pivko

Ilan Pivko (Hebrew: אילן פיבקו; born 7 September 1947, France) is an Israeli architect and urban designer, founder of Pivko Architects, active since 1975.

== Early life and education ==
Born in France to a father who later became head of orthopedics at Hadassah Hospital and a homemaker mother, Pivko immigrated to Israel age two and grew up in Tel Aviv. He attended Tel Nordau Elementary and Geula High School. He studied architecture at the Technion in Haifa, graduating in 1975, then returned to Tel Aviv where he trained at the Yasky firm .

== Career ==
After graduation, Pivko briefly ran a bamboo and wicker furniture business before founding Pivko Architects in 1981. The firm currently employs approximately 40 architects and engages in urban masterplans, residential towers, hotels, public buildings, private villas, offices, as well as interior and product design, and real estate development (da-list.com).

His practice has undertaken over 150 projects, across Israel and abroad, including mixed-use redevelopment, luxury residential, and public architectural commissions .

== Notable Projects ==
- Port Tel Aviv: A Mediterranean seafront development with around 40 luxury apartments and a five-star hotel. Designs include mosaic-like façades to act as a brise soleil, maximizing light and views (mansionglobal.com).
- 4Florentine, Tel Aviv: A residential complex in Florentin, part of urban revitalization efforts (gettyimages.in).
- Pilot projects in Jaffa such as “Pivko at the Port” integrating new additions into historic fabric—preserving Byzantine walls and Ottoman remnants (outthere.travel).
- Other major works span Herzliya, Ramat Gan, Kibbutz Ga’ash, Beersheba Science Park, Haifa villas, and infrastructure projects (pivko.com).

== Influence and legacy ==
Since the 1980s, Ilan Pivko has been associated with architectural projects that coincided with the broader urban redevelopment of Tel Aviv. During this period, central neighborhoods such as Shenkin Street experienced demographic and economic changes that attracted younger populations, including artists and designers, contributing to a shift in the city's urban character. Pivko's work, alongside that of other architects and planners, reflected and responded to these transformations, particularly through residential and mixed-use developments.

In addition to large-scale projects, Pivko has been involved in the adaptive reuse of historic structures, notably in the port area of Jaffa. One example is a personal residence he designed within a restored building incorporating remnants of Byzantine and Ottoman architecture. The project illustrates a design approach that integrates preservation of historic elements with contemporary architectural practices.

Pivko has commented publicly on the architectural evolution of Tel Aviv, referencing the influence of International Style buildings that form part of the city's "White City" designation by UNESCO. His work reflects both continuity with this legacy and incorporation of later postmodernist and luxury design trends. His career spans a period in which Tel Aviv underwent significant physical and cultural redevelopment, and his projects have formed part of that broader urban process.

== Philosophy and recognition ==
Regarded as one of Israel's leading architects, Pivko has been described as a “starchitect” with projects that command premium market demand—often achieving significantly higher sales prices compared to similar local developments (da-list.com).

His work has been featured in prestigious exhibitions, such as the Israel Museum’s “Ilan Pivko – Existing Conditions – Potential Conditions” in 1991, and has inspired a French ARTE documentary (da-list.com). The Israel Museum in Jerusalem hosted a solo exhibition titled Ilan Pivko – Existing Situation – Possible Situations, one of only three exhibitions at the museum dedicated to a living Israeli architect. In 1998, a documentary film about Pivko's architectural work was produced by ARTE, a French-German cultural channel. His work has also been featured in international architecture and design publications.

== Personal and public presence ==
Pivko resides in a signature apartment in Jaffa built atop a historic port structure, thoughtfully integrating archaeological finds and blending old and new—a setting he describes as living history (outthere.travel).

He maintains active engagement through his studio's online platforms and social media, sharing ongoing works like the Florentin Soho Square
