= Evolution on Gardiner =

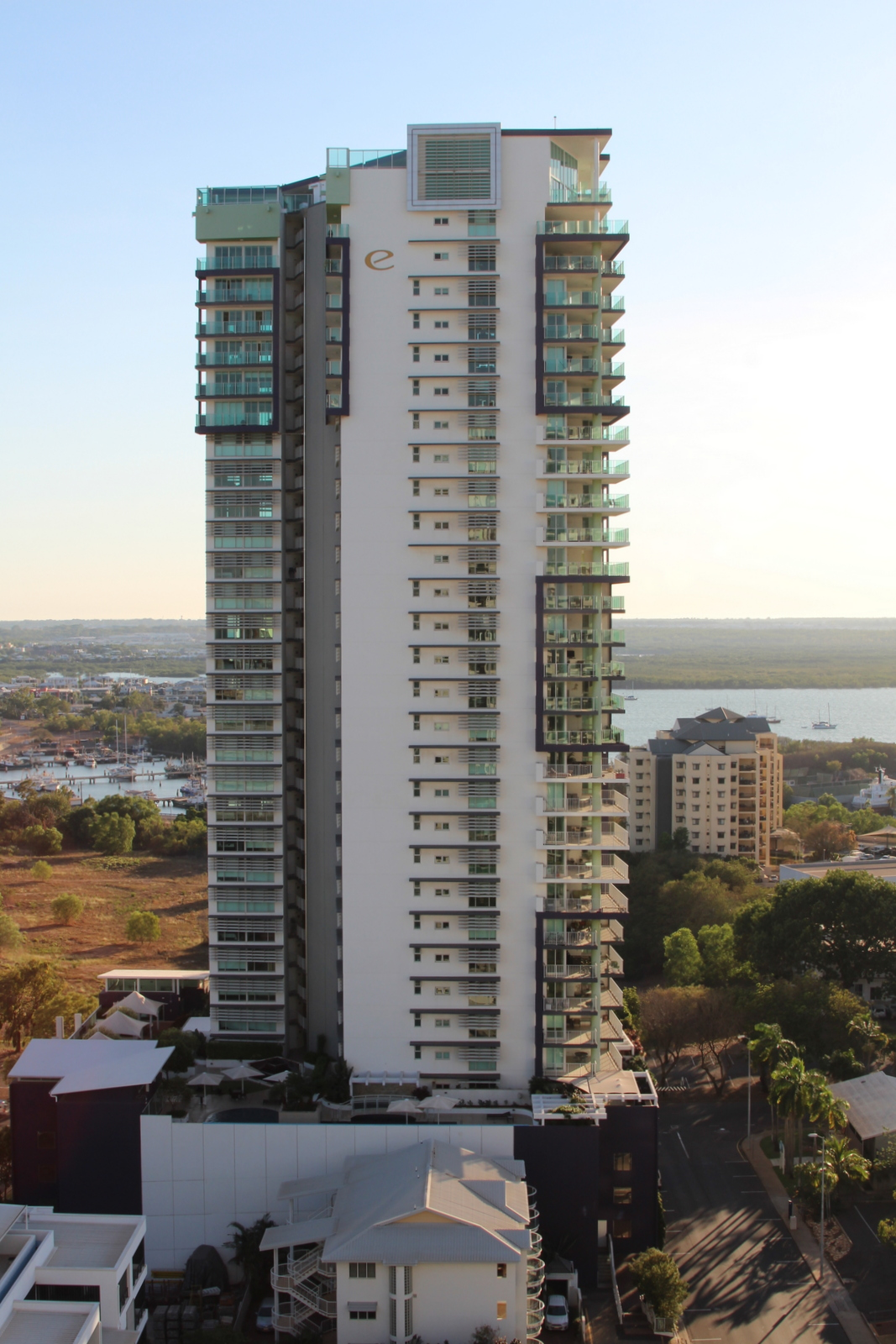
- August 2014

General information
- Type: Mixed
- Location: Darwin, Australia
- Coordinates: 12.460013°S 130.844228°E
- Construction started: July 2006
- Completed: July 2008

Height
- Roof: 100 m (328 ft)

Technical details
- Floor count: 33
- Floor area: 1,500 m^{2} (16,000 sq ft)

Design and construction
- Architect: Burling Brown Architects
- Main contractor: Sunbuild

Website
- www.sunbuild.com.au/projects/evolution-on-gardiner/

Evolution on Gardiner is a high-rise residential building and the tallest structure in Darwin, Northern Territory. It is located on the eastern part of the Darwin CBD on Knuckey Street. The roof of the tower is 100 metres above ground, reaching Darwin's maximum height limit of 120 meters above sea level. The project was designed by architectural firm Burling Brown Architects and was built by Darwin-based Sunbuild.

When first proposed in 2004, the project faced opposition from the Department of Defence, who control the airspace over the city. Defence objected to the height of the tower which would be more than twice the height of any other building in Darwin at the time, calling for it to be reduced to 28 stories. Sunbuild successfully lobbied the department to have the height restriction raised in order to ensure the project's viability and secure construction.

Construction began on Evolution in July 2006 and was completed in July 2008. The building has five commercial suites on the ground floor, 104 apartments, two penthouses, 1500 m^{2} of floor space, and three high-speed lifts for quick vertical transport.
