= List of tallest buildings in Balneário Camboriú =

Skyline of Balneário Camboriú
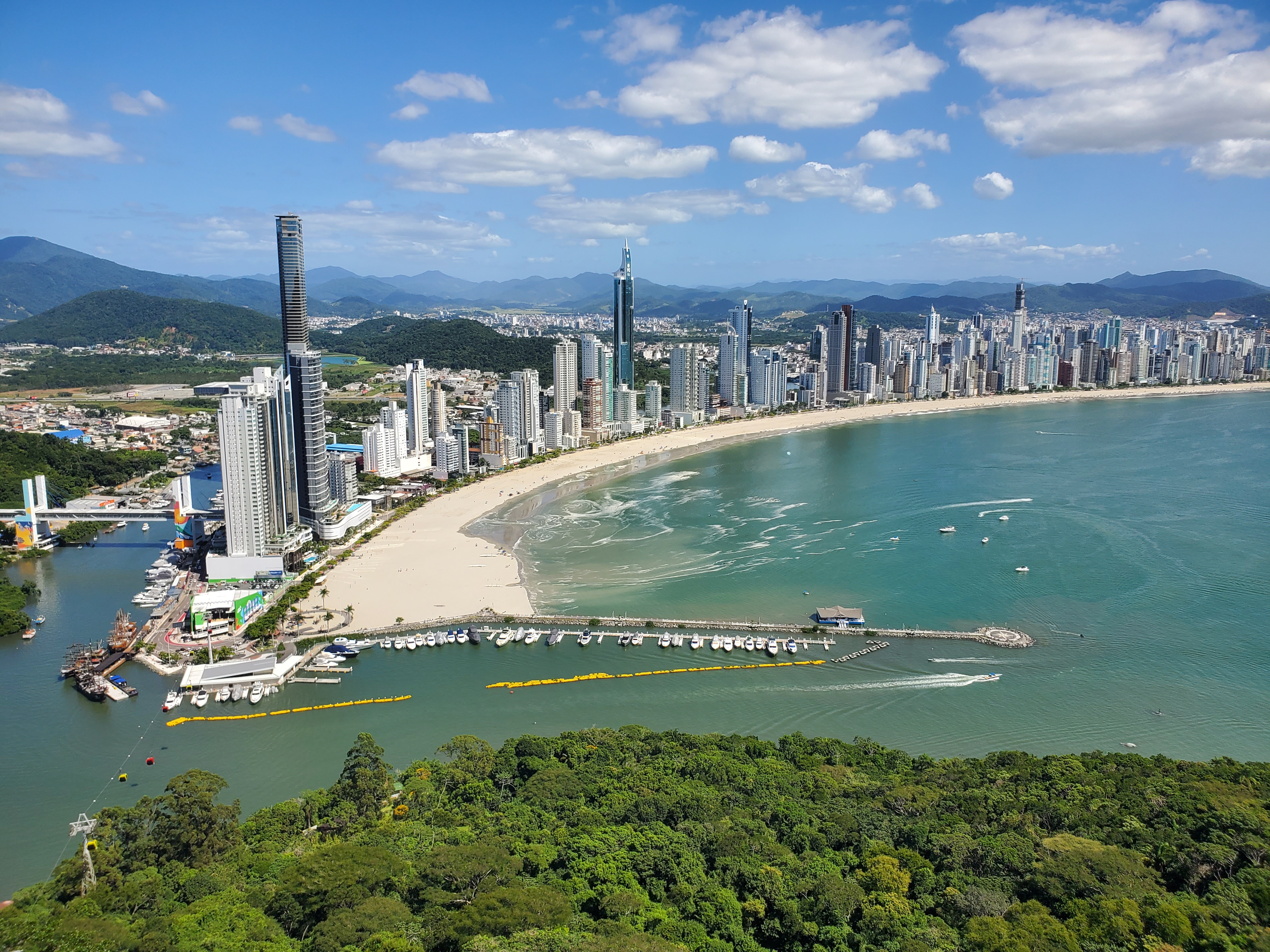
- Skyline of Balneário Camboriú, viewed from the Parque Unipraias cable car in 2023
- Tallest building: Yachthouse Residence Club (2023)
- Tallest building height: 294 m (965 ft)
- First 150 m+ building: Sea's Palace Residence (2012)

Number of tall buildings (2026)
- Taller than 150 m (492 ft): 30
- Taller than 200 m (656 ft): 5

The city of Balneário Camboriú, Brazil is home to 30 skyscrapers taller than 150 meters (492 feet), five of which are taller than 200 m (656 ft) as of 2026. Balneário Camboriú is a coastal city in the state of Santa Catarina with a municipal population of 139,155. The city is a popular tourist destination among Brazilians and for South Americans in general, which swell the city's population considerably to over a million during the summer. Rising real estate prices have also encouraged vertical development; the city has the highest price per square meter in Brazil. This has led to the construction of numerous residential skyscrapers and high-rises on the city's waterfront, also known as Barra Sul. The prevalence of tall buildings has led given Balneário Camboriú the nickname of "Brazilian Dubai"

While Balneário Camboriú had built up a coastal skyline of high-rises by the 2000s, the city's first skyscraper to reach 150 m (492 ft) in height was only completed in 2012. The city has been undergoing a construction boom in skyscrapers starting from the early 2010s, a trend that has intensified into the 2020s. Since the early 2020s, the boom has also spread to the neighbouring coastal cities of Itapema, Itajaí, and Navegantes, all of which are receiving an increasing number of high-rise proposals.

The tallest buildings in the city are the twin skyscrapers of the Yachthouse Residence Club complex, built in 2023. Both buildings rise to a height of 294 m (965 ft), near the 300-meter mark required to be considered a supertall skyscraper. The buildings are also the tallest in Brazil. Indeed, the city's four tallest buildings all correspond to the four tallest buildings in Brazil. This is quite unusual as most country's tallest buildings are located in their largest cities; Unlike many of Brazil's major cities, such as São Paulo, Balneário Camboriú has lax height restrictions, allowing for the construction of particularly tall skyscrapers. Many of the tallest buildings in the city were developed by FG Empreendimentos.

Construction began in 2025 on Senna Tower, a supertall skyscraper that is expected to reach 544 m (1,785 ft) in height. When complete, it will replace Gran Torre Costanera in Santiago as the tallest building in South America, and Central Park Tower in New York City as the tallest residential building in the world.

== Tallest buildings ==
This lists ranks completed skyscrapers in Balneário Camboriú that stand at least 150 m (492 ft) tall as of 2026, based on standard height measurement. This includes spires and architectural details but does not include antenna masts. The “Year” column indicates the year of completion. Buildings tied in height are sorted by year of completion with earlier buildings ranked first, and then alphabetically.

Was the tallest building in Balneário Camboriú upon completion

Rank	Name	Image	Height m (ft)	Floors	Year	Purpose	Notes
1	Yachthouse Residence Club Tower 2		294.1 (965)	80	2023	Residential	Tallest building in Balneário Camboriú since 2023. Tallest building completed in Balneário Camboriú in the 2020s.
2	Yachthouse Residence Club Tower 1		294 (965)	80	2023	Residential	
3	One Tower		290 (951)	70	2022	Residential	Tallest building in Balneário Camboriú briefly from 2022 to 2023.
4	Boreal Tower		241 (791)	55	2025	Residential	
5	Infinity Coast Tower		234.8 (770)	66	2019	Residential	Tallest building in Balneário Camboriú from 2019 to 2022.
6	Vitra by Pininfarina	—	211.5 (694)	62	2025	Residential	
7	Epic Tower		191.1 (627)	56	2020	Residential	
8	Copenhagen	—	190 (623)	51	2022	Residential	
9	Millennium Palace		177.3 (582)	46	2014	Residential	Tallest building in Balneário Camboriú from 2014 to 2019.
10	Splendido	—	176 (577)	50	2020	Residential	
11	New York Apartments	—	176 (577)	51	2021	Residential	
12	Splendia Tower	—	175 (574)	43	2019	Residential	
13	Alameda Jardins Residence	—	174 (571)	45	2015	Residential	
14	Magnifique Tower	—	170.5 (559)	47	2021	Residential	
15	Império das Ondas	—	165 (541)	51	2016	Residential	
16	Villa Serena Home Club Torre A		164 (538)	46	2013	Residential	Tallest building in Balneário Camboriú briefly from 2013 to 2014.
17	Villa Serena Home Club Torre B		164 (538)	49	2013	Residential	Tallest building in Balneário Camboriú briefly from 2013 to 2014.
18	Phoenix Tower	—	164 (538) (Note: This figure is an estimate from the Skyscraper Center.)	48	2020	Residential	
19	Sea's Palace Residence	—	160 (525)	40	2012	Residential	Tallest building in Balneário Camboriú briefly from 2012 to 2013.
20	Vision Tower	—	160 (525)	38	2017	Residential	
21	Aurora Exclusive Home	—	160 (525)	50	2023	Residential	
22	Edifício Pharos	—	159.7 (524)	46	2021	Residential	
23	Olympo Tower	—	153 (502)	44	2020	Residential	
24	Ocean Palace	—	152.8 (501)	42	2012	Residential	
25	Serendipity Village	—	152 (499)	45	2019	Residential	
26	Illuminati	—	151 (495)	44	2017	Residential	
27	Eleganza Tower	—	151 (495)	44	2021	Residential	
28	Royal Tower	—	151 (495)	44	2021	Residential	
29	Ibiza Towers – Torre Central	—	150 (492)	43	2015	Residential	
30	Falcon Tower	—	150 (492)	40	2020	Residential	
31	Ocean Breeze	—	150 (492)	45	2021	Residential	

== Tallest under construction or proposed ==
=== Under construction ===
This lists ranks skyscrapers under construction in Balneário Camboriú that are planned to be at least 150 m (492 ft) tall as of June 2026, based on standard height measurement. This includes spires and architectural details but does not include antenna masts. The “Year” column denotes the expected year of completion.

Name	Height m (ft)	Floors	Year	Purpose	Notes
Senna Tower	544 (1,785)	135	2030	Residential	
Titanium Tower	240 (787)	54	2027	Residential	
Iconic Tower	216 (709)	53	2027	Residential	
Marena	196.3 (644)	60	2028	Residential	
Harmony Ocean Front	193.8 (636)	58	–	Residential	
Imperium Tower	192 (630)	42	–	Residential	
Blue Coast Tower	186 (610)	–	2026	Residential	
Ápice Tower 1	184.2 (604)	55	2028	Residential	
Ápice Tower 2	184.2 (604)	55	2028	Residential	
Fischer Dreams Torre Sul	177 (581)	54	2026	Residential	
Blue View Tower	172 (564)	47	2028	Residential	
Tonino Lamborghini Residences Balneário Camboriú	168 (551)	53	2026	Residential	
Fischer Dreams Torre Norte	164.8 (541)	51	2026	Residential	
Alaia	161.9 (531)	49	2027	Residential	
La Città by Pininfarina	152.7 (501)	45	2026	Residential	

== Timeline of tallest buildings ==
This lists buildings that once held the title of the tallest building in Balneário Camboriú.

Name	Image	Years as tallest	Height m (ft)	Floors	Notes
Praia do Sol	—	2004–2012	145 (476)	38	
Sea's Palace Residence	—	2012–2013	160 (525)	32	
Villa Serena Home Club		2013–2014	164 (538)	46	
Millennium Palace		2014–2019	177.3 (582)	46	
Infinity Coast Tower		2019–2022	234.8 (770)	66	
One Tower		2022–2023	290 (951)	70	
Yachthouse Residence Club		2023–present	294.1 (965)	80	
