= International Trade Center (Salvador, Brazil) =

Skyscraper in Salvador, Bahia, Brazil

- Interactive map of the International Trade Center area

General information
- Status: Completed
- Type: Mixed-use
- Architectural style: Modern
- Location: Rua Doutor José Peroba, 1463, Salvador, Bahia, Brazil
- Coordinates: 12°59′13.97″S 38°26′55.25″W
- Completed: 2018

Height
- Roof: 160.1 m (525 ft)

Technical details
- Floor count: 37

The International Trade Center is a 160.1 m (525 ft) tall modern office building located on Rua Doutor José Peroba, 1463 in Salvador, Brazil. The building has 37 floors and was built in 2018. Upon its completion, it became the tallest building in Salvador, surpassing the 154.5 m (507 ft) tall Mansão Margarida Costa Pinto which was built in 2008. It also is one of the tallest buildings in Brazil.

== See also ==
- List of tallest buildings in Brazil
- List of tallest buildings in South America
- Orion Complex Goiânia
- Yachthouse Residence Club
