= Villa Serena Home Club =

Skyscraper in Balneário Camboriú, Brazil

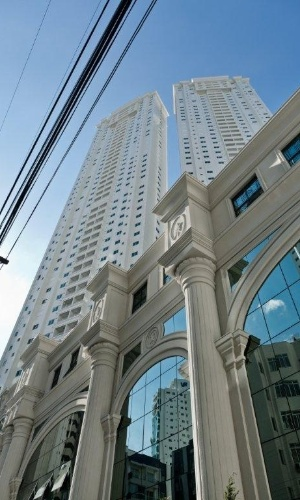
- Interactive map of the Villa Serena Home Club area

General information
- Status: Completed
- Type: Residential
- Location: Balneário Camboriú, Brazil, R. 3706, 100 - Centro, Balneário Camboriú - SC, 88330-215
- Coordinates: 27.00212°S 48.62180°W
- Construction started: 2007
- Completed: 2013

Height
- Roof: 164 m (538 ft) (both)

Technical details
- Structural system: Concrete
- Floor count: 46

Design and construction
- Architect: Ivo Peretto Filho
- Developer: Embraed

Website
- Villa Serena Home Club

Villa Serena Home Club is a residential skyscraper building complex in the Barra Sul district of Balneário Camboriú, Brazil. Built between 2007 and 2013, the complex consists of two twin towers standing at 164 m (538 ft) tall with 46 floors each. They are the current 17th tallest buildings in Brazil.

== History ==
=== Architecture ===
In 2013, Brazilian company Embraed completed the construction of the site which was aimed to house the biggest residential building in the country exclusively for residential purposes. The project is located in the Barra Sul neighborhood of Balneário Camboriú. The volumetric structure comprises two towers, each rising up to 46 floors, showcasing the identity of the company's standards. The real estate sector in Balneário Camboriú experienced rapid growth, standing out in Santa Catarina. Today, this market is firmly established as one of the biggest in Brazil. Since that time, Embraed has seen substantial expansion and has constructed projects that rank as some of the biggest in the nation and globally.

At the time, the common entrance hall of the towers was a major attraction due to its unique quadruple-height ceiling of 16 meters, which is equal to 4 floors. The leisure and relaxation zone was also notable for its large size and wide range of offerings, which are characteristic of a club. It is open 24 hours a day for owners and covers an area of 10,000 square meters. The pool contains 840,000 liters of water.

The foundation blocks for the large project were made using pre-cooled concrete, as recommended by the project engineer Ernandi Fey. The temperature was maintained at six different points during the initial week. The structure has a weight of around 65,000 tons, containing a total of 164 rentable apartment units and 543 parking spots, in addition to offering a view to the ocean.

Additionally, 693 piles, each measuring 30 meters in depth and 60 meters in diameter, were required.

== See also ==
- List of tallest buildings in Brazil
- List of tallest buildings in South America
