= Concórdia Corporate =

Skyscraper in Nova Lima, Brazil

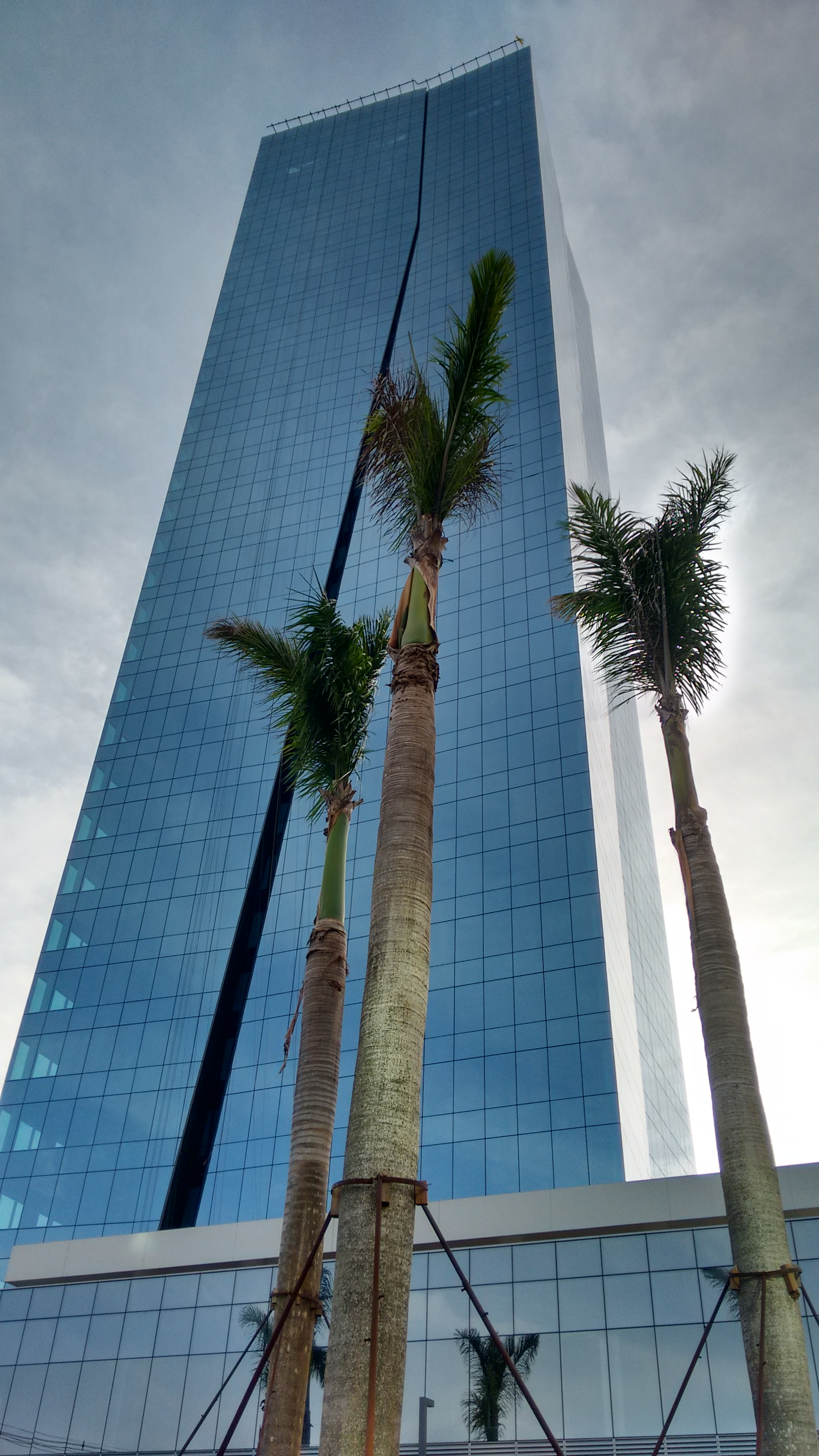
- Concórdia Corporate in 2018
- Interactive map of the Concórdia Corporate area

General information
- Status: Completed
- Type: Mixed-use building
- Location: Vila da Serra / Vale do Sereno, Alameda Oscar Niemeyer, 132, Nova Lima, Minas Gerais, Brazil
- Coordinates: 19.98377°S 43.94597°W
- Construction started: 2015
- Completed: 2018

Height
- Height: 169.6 m (556 ft)

Technical details
- Structural system: Steel structure with concrete core and steel-deck slabs
- Floor count: 43
- Floor area: 59,217 m^{2} (637,410 sq ft)
- Lifts/elevators: 16

Design and construction
- Architect: Dávila Arquitetura
- Developer: Tishman Speyer; Construtora Caparaó
- Structural engineer: CODEME
- Main contractor: Construtora Caparaó

Website
- concordiacorporate.com.br

Concórdia Corporate is a mixed-use skyscraper in Nova Lima, Minas Gerais, Brazil, in the Belo Horizonte metropolitan area. Completed in 2018, the tower has 43 floors and an architectural height of 169.6 m (556 ft). As of 2026, it is the tallest building in Minas Gerais.

The building was developed by Tishman Speyer and Construtora Caparaó, with architectural design by Dávila Arquitetura. It combines office space with four residential lofts, parking levels, ground-floor commercial areas, a restaurant and a helipad. Its glass tower, composite steel-and-concrete structure and diagonal façade openings have made it a prominent high-rise in the Nova Lima skyline.

Concórdia Corporate was built for the expanding office market in Vila da Serra and Vale do Sereno. It became one of Brazil's tallest steel-structure towers and won the 2019 Prêmio Master Imobiliário award in the commercial development category.

== Development ==
Tishman Speyer and Construtora Caparaó developed the project in Nova Lima, near Belo Horizonte. Early plans called for a large corporate tower with open floor plates for companies moving into Vila da Serra and Vale do Sereno, an area that had become one of the metropolitan region's main real-estate growth areas.

The tower was launched in 2015 with an expected investment of about R$350 million. It occupied a site of more than 7,600 m^{2} (82,000 sq ft) on Alameda Oscar Niemeyer, where Clube Chalezinho had operated until 2012. The developers included Tishman Speyer, Construtora Caparaó and CODEME, with financing from Banco do Brasil.

Neighborhood groups criticized the project because of its visual effect, traffic and possible environmental impacts near the Serra do Curral. The Minas Gerais Public Prosecutor's Office required the developers to sign a commitment agreement with conditions to reduce those impacts. Construction began in 2015 and the building was completed in 2018.

== Architecture and features ==
The architects shaped the tower as a glass prism with diagonal openings on its four façades. The changing floor plates give the building a pinwheel-like profile, and the vertical cuts are illuminated at night. The tower sits diagonally on its lot, taking advantage of the site's position between Alameda Oscar Niemeyer and the road facing the valley.

Concórdia Corporate has a concrete base and core, with a mixed steel-and-concrete structure above the ground floor. The typical floors use composite beams, steel-deck slabs and 12 perimeter composite columns. Some columns between the 8th and 14th floors are inclined to follow the changing planes of the façade. This structure keeps columns near the perimeter and leaves broad interior areas for office use.

The building has 31 office floors, eight parking levels, four residential lofts, a helipad, ground-floor shops, a restaurant and an auditorium. It has 43 floors, 16 elevators, 788 parking spaces and 59,217 m^{2} (637,410 sq ft) of gross floor area. The lobby includes a high entrance portico, landscaping and reflecting pools.

The glass façade is one of the building's main visual features. Its full glass enclosure emphasizes the tower's shifting profile, with a vertical slit on each side that moves slightly as the floors rise.

== Sustainability and awards ==
The building uses environmental measures such as high-performance glazing, rainwater and condensate reuse, regenerative elevator braking and systems intended to reduce water and energy consumption. The building has achieved LEED Gold environmental certification.

Concórdia Corporate won the 2019 Prêmio Master Imobiliário awards in the commercial development category. CODEME also awarded the building the 2019 Prêmio Talento Engenharia Estrutural.

== Tenancy and use ==
Concórdia Corporate was developed for large corporate tenants. This was Tishman Speyer first development in the Minas Gerais market, after earlier projects in São Paulo, Rio de Janeiro and Brasília. In 2019, Vale S.A. signed a ten-year lease for about 175,000 sq ft (16,300 m^{2}) of office space, covering roughly 52 percent of the property. The building has also flexible office space under the Studio by Tishman Speyer brand.

== Gallery ==
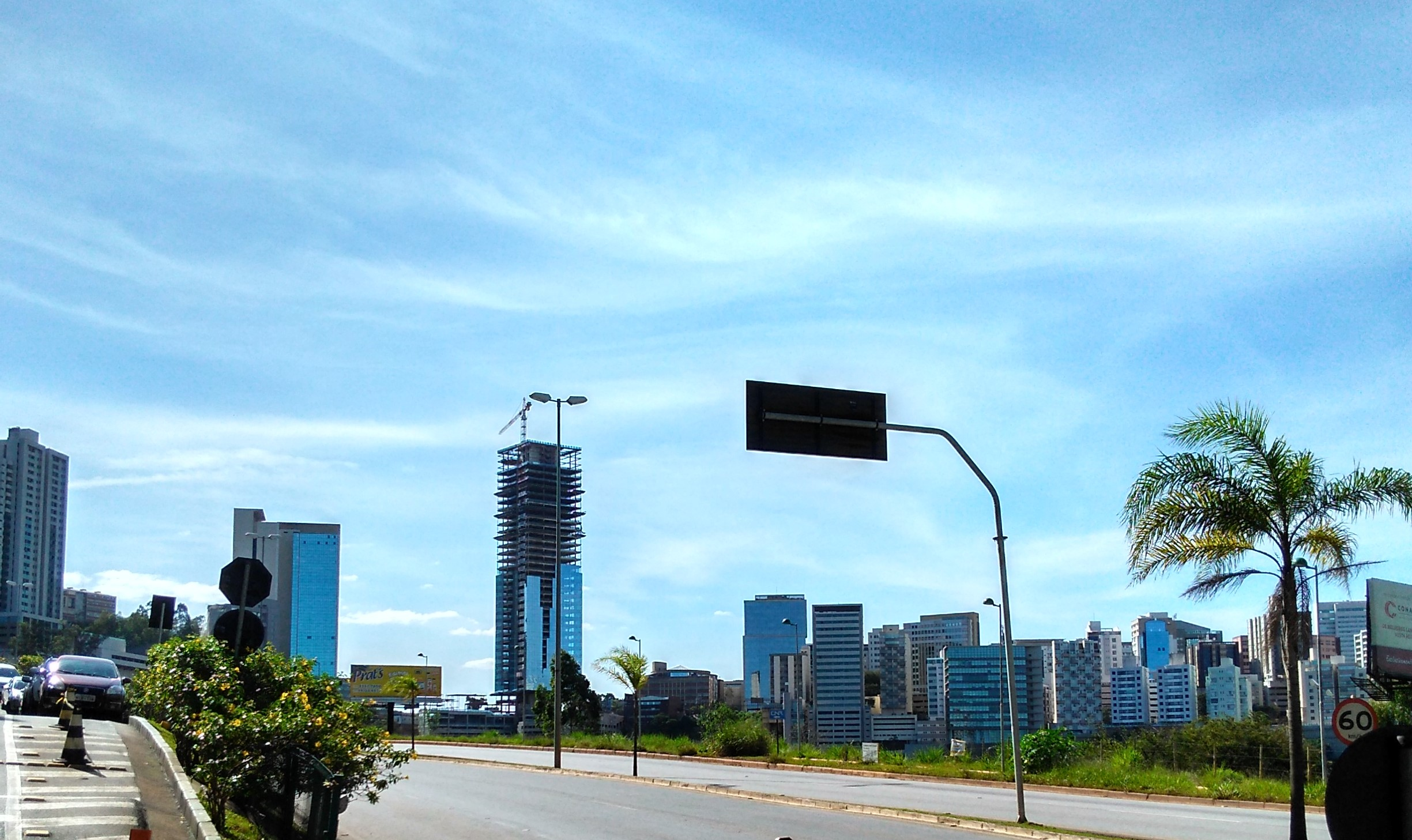
Skyline of Vila da Serra in Nova Lima in 2016, with the Icon towers at left and Concórdia Corporate under construction near the center.

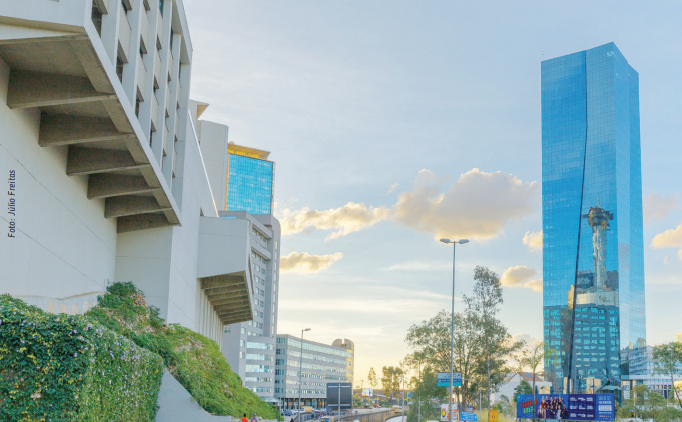
View of Concórdia Corporate and nearby buildings around the Seis Pistas area of Nova Lima.

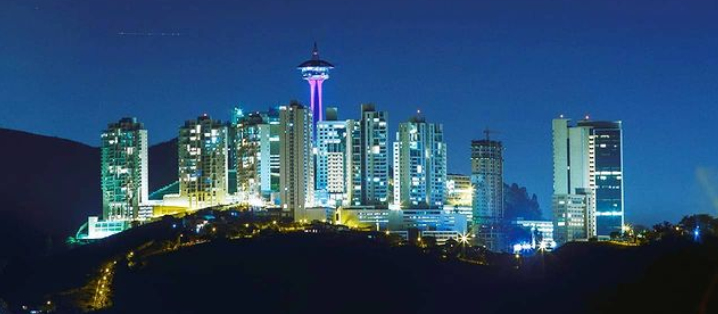
Vila da Serra and nearby landmarks in Nova Lima.

== See also ==
- Edifício Acaiaca, another skyscraper in Belo Horizonte
- Aureliano Chaves building, another skyscraper in Belo Horizonte
- List of tallest buildings in Brazil
- List of tallest buildings in South America
