= Millennium Palace =

Coordinates: 26°59′33″S 48°37′44″W

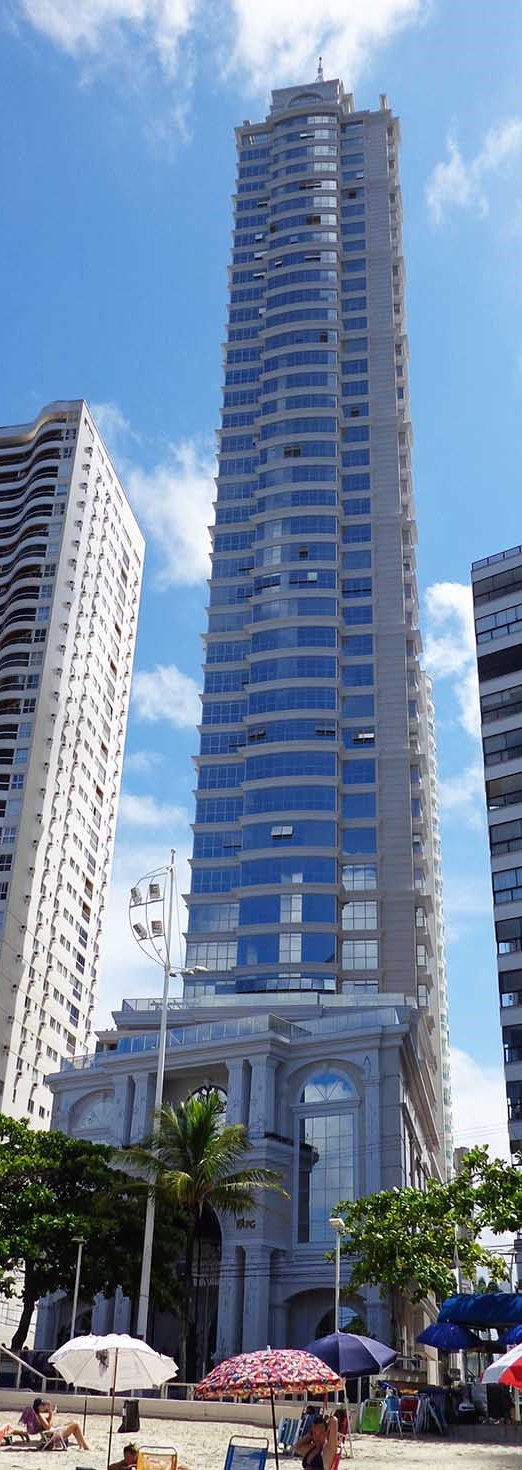
- Millennium Palace
- Interactive map of the Millennium Palace area

Record height
- Tallest in Brazil from 2014 to 2018^{[I]}

General information
- Type: Residential
- Location: Balneário Camboriú, Brazil, Avenida Atlântica, 2670
- Inaugurated: 2014

Height
- Roof: 177.3 m (582 ft)

Technical details
- Floor count: 45

Design and construction
- Architects: Eugênio Nelson; Renato Ammann

Millennium Palace Camboriú is a residential condominium skyscraper in Balneário Camboriú, Santa Catarina, Brazil. It was the first building in 50 years to surpass Mirante do Vale as the tallest in Brazil, a position it held before being surpassed by Infinity Coast in 2019. Millennium Palace has 45 floors up to, and including, the first floor of the two-floor penthouse, plus the additional second floor of the penthouse, totaling 177.3 metres (581.7 feet) in height and 46 floors.

Millennium Palace Residence is a luxury development project, and with one of the largest total investment values in Balneário Camboriú and also of Southern Brasil, due to the materials used and technology employed. Each floor has a floor to floor height of 3.5 metres (11.5 feet) (37 typical apartments) and facing the ocean.

The Development project was inaugurated on 10 August 2014.

The building is 157.3 metres (516.1 feet) tall until the end of floor 45, which corresponds to the end of the main volume of the building, or the top of the first floor of the Penthouse, or where the open pool is on the roof and where the last floor begins. Above this the Penthouse has one more floor plus the roof and the small version of the mini Eiffel tower.

With the penthouse included, plus the roof over the same, it is 168.8 metres (553.8 feet) tall in height. Above this, the building has a mini tower, small replica version of the Eiffel Tower at the top, on the roof below and going up. This small tower is 8.5 metres (27.9 feet) tall in height, coming to a grand total of 177.3 metres (581.7 feet) in height, which is the highest any building has ever reached in Brazil.

== See also ==
- Yachthouse Residence Club
- Infinity Coast
- List of tallest buildings in Balneario Camboriu
- List of tallest buildings in Brazil
- List of tallest buildings in South America

Records
Preceded by Mirante do Vale	Tallest building in Brazil; 177.3 m (581.7 ft); 2014–2018	Succeeded by Tour Geneve
