= Epic Tower =

Skyscraper in Balneário Camboriú, Brazil

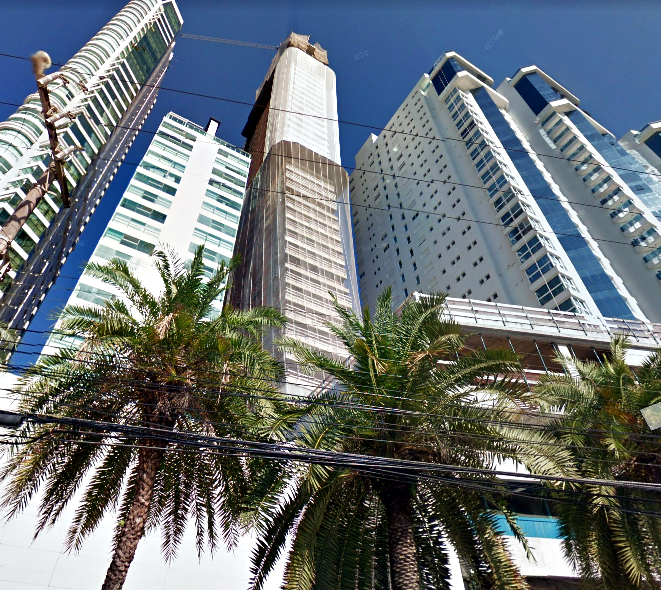
- Interactive map of the Epic Tower area

General information
- Status: Completed
- Type: Residential
- Location: Balneário Camboriú, Brazil, Av. Atlântica, 4700 Barra Sul, Balneário Camboriú
- Coordinates: 27.00534°S 48.61481°W
- Construction started: 2014
- Completed: 2020
- Owner: FG Prime Empreendimentos

Height
- Roof: 191.1 m (627 ft)

Technical details
- Structural system: Concrete
- Floor count: 56

Design and construction
- Developer: FG Empreendimentos
- Structural engineer: Reical Engenharia (Structural); Canteiro AEC (MEP)
- Main contractor: FG Empreendimentos

Website
- Epic Tower

The Epic Tower is a residential skyscraper in Balneário Camboriú, Brazil. Built between 2014 and 2020, the tower stands at 191.1 m (627 ft) with 56 floors and is the current 5th tallest building in Brazil.

== History ==
=== Architecture ===
The Epic Tower is located on the North Coast of Balneário Camboriú, a municipality where some of the tallest buildings in Brazil and the continent have recently been built, such as the Yachthouse Residence Club complex (2021), the Infinity Coast (2019), the Órion Business & Health Complex (2018) or the Millennium Palace (2014).

The construction of the Epic Tower involved almost 2,500 tons of steel, 23,600 m^{3} of concrete and more than 620 companies. 1 It was designed by the architectural studio LDD Arquitetura and its structural engineer was Reical Engenharia. 2 Its main characteristic is the curved façade, which determines variations in the area of each residential unit (from 270 to 332 m^{2}).

The tower was built on a 2,000 m^{2} (21,500 sq ft) plot and provides an 180-degree view of the central beach of Balneário Camboriú.

== See also ==
- List of tallest buildings in Brazil
- List of tallest buildings in South America
