= HL Park Vaca Brava =

Skyscraper in Goiânia, Brazil

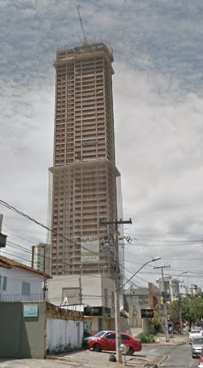
- Interactive map of the HL Park Vaca Brava area

General information
- Status: Completed
- Type: Residential
- Location: Goiânia, Brazil, R. C-238, 359 - Jardim América, Goiânia
- Coordinates: 16.70755°S 49.27620°W
- Construction started: 2019
- Completed: 2020
- Owner: SIM Engenharia; J.Virgilio; MA Incorporadora

Height
- Roof: 173 m (568 ft)

Technical details
- Structural system: Concrete
- Floor count: 44 (+2 underground)

Design and construction
- Architects: Andrey Machado (Unyt Arquitetos Associados); Takeda Paisagismo (landscape)
- Developer: Bambuí
- Main contractor: Bambuí

Website
- Kingdom Park Residence

HL Park Vaca Brava (also known as Kingdom Park Residence) is a residential skyscraper in Goiânia, Brazil. Built between 2019 and 2022, the tower stands at 173 m (568 ft) tall with 44 floors and is the current 9th tallest building in Brazil.

== History ==
=== Architecture ===
With 52 floors, it is already considered the tallest residential building in the Central-West. Overlooking Vaca Brava Park, the development features landscaping designed by the offices of Brazilian landscape architect Roberto Burle Marx and Japanese landscape architect Haruyoshi Ono.

The project, which underwent 42 months of construction, was completed in May 2020. Highlights include a higher ceiling height of 3.4 m, high-speed elevators, a wind farm at the top of the building for its own energy production, and fast-charging sockets for electric vehicles. The apartments are individual per floor, with 482 square meters and ranging from 4 to 5 suites, with the top floor being a duplex penthouse. The average price is around R$4 million per apartment.

Public-private partnership (PPP) - Through municipal law 10,346 of May 17, 2019, the Adopt a Square program was created, which establishes parameters for partnerships to be established between the City of Goiânia and private entities, individuals and legal entities, and also social organizations for the purpose of maintaining and preserving public assets such as squares and green areas, monuments, and Municipal Public Areas (APMs).

In the case of Kingdom, the partnership with private investments of around R$400,000 resulted in the construction of Praça Burle Marx, with 700 square meters, the land adjacent to the development that was previously the sidewalk of the avenue was annexed to the sidewalk, the now square has a large walkable area with vegetation and benches, and was built with the support of the local community through a petition.

== See also ==
- List of tallest buildings in Brazil
- List of tallest buildings in South America
