= One Tower (Balneário Camboriú) =

Coordinates: 27.00591°S 48.61212°W

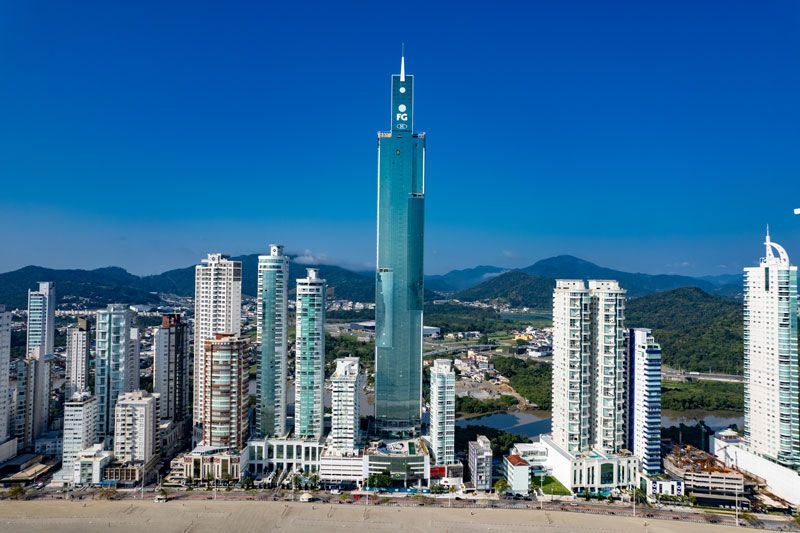
- Interactive map of the One Tower area

Record height
- Tallest in Brazil from 2022 to 2024^{[I]}

General information
- Type: Residential
- Location: Balneário Camboriú, Brazil, Avenida Atlantica, 4954
- Construction started: 2015
- Completed: 2022

Height
- Roof: 290 m (951 ft)

Technical details
- Floor count: 77

The One Tower is a skyscraper located in the city of Balneário Camboriú in southern Brazil. Completed in December 2022, it became the tallest building in the country and the second tallest skyscraper in South America, at 290 meters (951 feet) tall. In 2024, this building was surpassed by the twin towers Yachthouse Residence Club, situated in the same city.

== See also ==
- Infinity Coast
- Yachthouse Residence Club
- List of tallest buildings in Brazil
- List of tallest buildings in South America
- List of tallest buildings

Records
Preceded by Infinity Coast	Tallest building in Brazil; 290 m (951 ft); 2022–2023	Succeeded by Yachthouse Residence Club
