= Tour Geneve =

Skyscraper in João Pessoa, Paraíba, Brazil

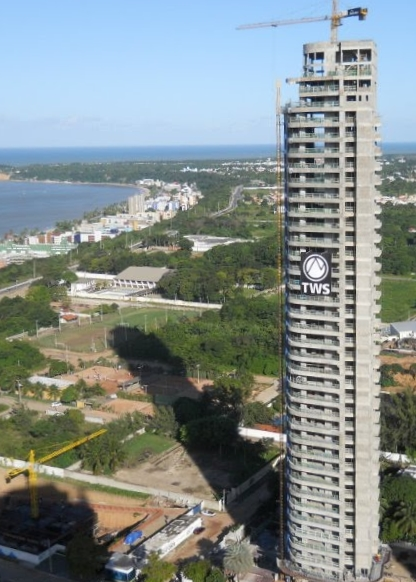
- Interactive map of the Tour Geneve area

General information
- Status: Completed
- Type: Residential
- Location: João Pessoa, Paraíba, Brazil, 81 R. Ana Guedes De Vasconcelos, Altiplano Cabo Branco, João Pessoa
- Coordinates: 7.13067°S 34.82759°W
- Construction started: 2012
- Completed: 2018

Height
- Roof: 182.3 m (598 ft)

Technical details
- Structural system: Concrete
- Floor count: 51
- Lifts/elevators: 3 (Orona Sociedad Cooperativa)

Design and construction
- Architects: Paulo Macêdo e Sócios & Bethania Tejo Arquitetos Associados
- Developer: TWS
- Main contractor: TWS

Website
- Complexo Tour Geneve

Tour Geneve is a residential skyscraper in the Altiplano district of João Pessoa, Paraíba, Brazil. Built between 2012 and 2018, it is 182.3 m (598 ft) tall with 51 floors and is the current 6th tallest building in Brazil.

== History ==
=== Architecture ===
The building is in the Altiplano neighborhood of João Pessoa, Paraíba, in the state of Paraíba and was inaugurated on September 21, 2018. It has 51 floors, standing at 182.3 meters high, making it the tallest building in the city, the sixth tallest building in Brazil and the 19th tallest in South America. It has an observation deck which is open to the public and houses 94 rentable apartments . It was designed by the Brazilian firm Paulo Macêdo e Sócios.

Built as a modern style tower, it was the first building to reach the milestone 50 floors in Brazil since the construction of Mirante do Vale in 1960. At the time of its inauguration it was the second tallest building in the country, surpassed only by the Órion Business & Health Complex, built the same year in Goiânia. The main contractor of the work was the company TWS, which was also in charge of building it. Bethania Tejo Arquitetos Associados was in charge of the interior design of the building.

Its spire is 18.59 metres high. It has a total of 94 residential units, 45 office units and 21 shops, comprising a total of 160 usable spaces. The height of the lobby is 6.55 meters.

The concept of the tower was designed by architect Paulo Macêdo and the landscape design was created by Patrícia Lago and Michel Lang. The design is inspired by the Jet d'Eau fountain in the city of Geneva in Switzerland. Its design is characterized by its sober colors and rounded shapes.

== See also ==
- List of tallest buildings in Brazil
- List of tallest buildings in South America

Records
Preceded by Millennium Palace	Tallest building in Brazil; 182.3 m (598 ft); 2018–2018	Succeeded by Orion Complex
