= Yachthouse Residence Club =

Skyscraper complex in Balneário Camboriú, Brazil

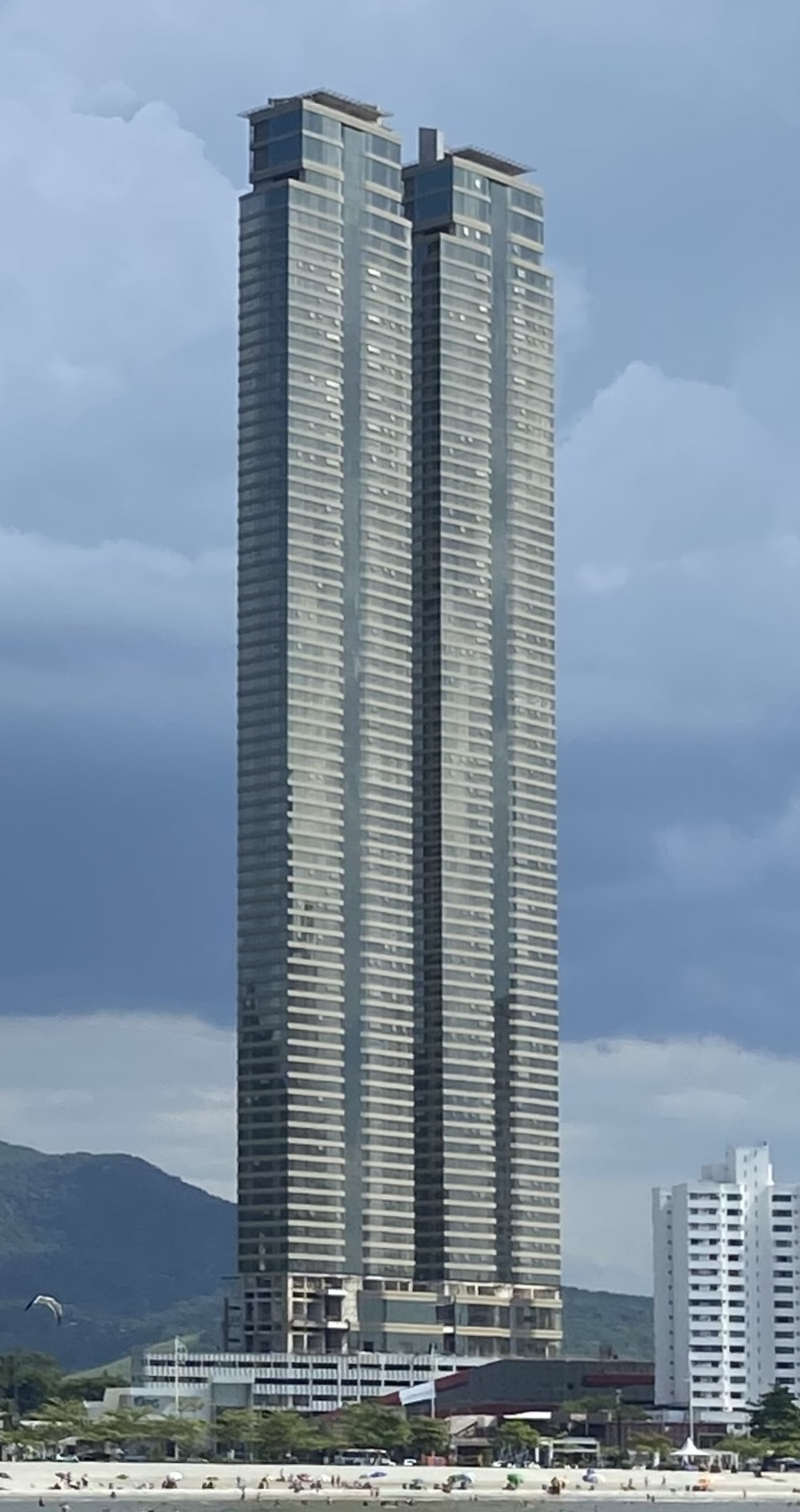
- Yachthouse Residence Club Twin Towers in 2023

Record height
- Tallest in Brazil since 2024^{[I]}

General information
- Type: Residential
- Location: Balneário Camboriú, Santa Catarina, Brazil, Avenida Normando Tedesco, 1333
- Coordinates: 27°00′27″S 48°36′26″W
- Construction started: 2017; 9 years ago
- Completed: 2023; 3 years ago

Height
- Roof: 294 m (965 ft)

Technical details
- Floor count: 81

Website
- yachthouse.net.br

Yachthouse Residence Club is a complex of twin skyscrapers in the coastal city of Balneário Camboriú, Santa Catarina, southern Brazil. In 2020, the towers reached the height of 281 metres (922 feet) and 81 floors, being the highest buildings in Brazil. In 2022, the two buildings were surpassed by the One Tower, being the second tallest in Brazil and the third-tallest in South America (third only to Gran Torre Santiago in Chile and One Tower, located in the same city). However, construction continued until 2022. In 2024, with the construction of two pinnacles, the twin towers reached the height of 294 metres (964.5 feet) and became the tallest buildings in Brazil again. The building will be the tallest in Brazil until the completion of the newest Senna Tower in the same city.

== Construction ==
The building's construction involved about 600 workers and 87,000 square metres (940,000 sq ft) of concrete. The outrigger technique was employed.

== Extreme sports ==
Owing to its height, Yachthouse has become, even before its completion, a preferred site for extreme sports. In November 2017, basejumpers from all across Brazil reunited to jump from a 180-metre (590 ft) height. In January 2021, wingsuit enthusiasts used the building for their practice.

== Gallery ==
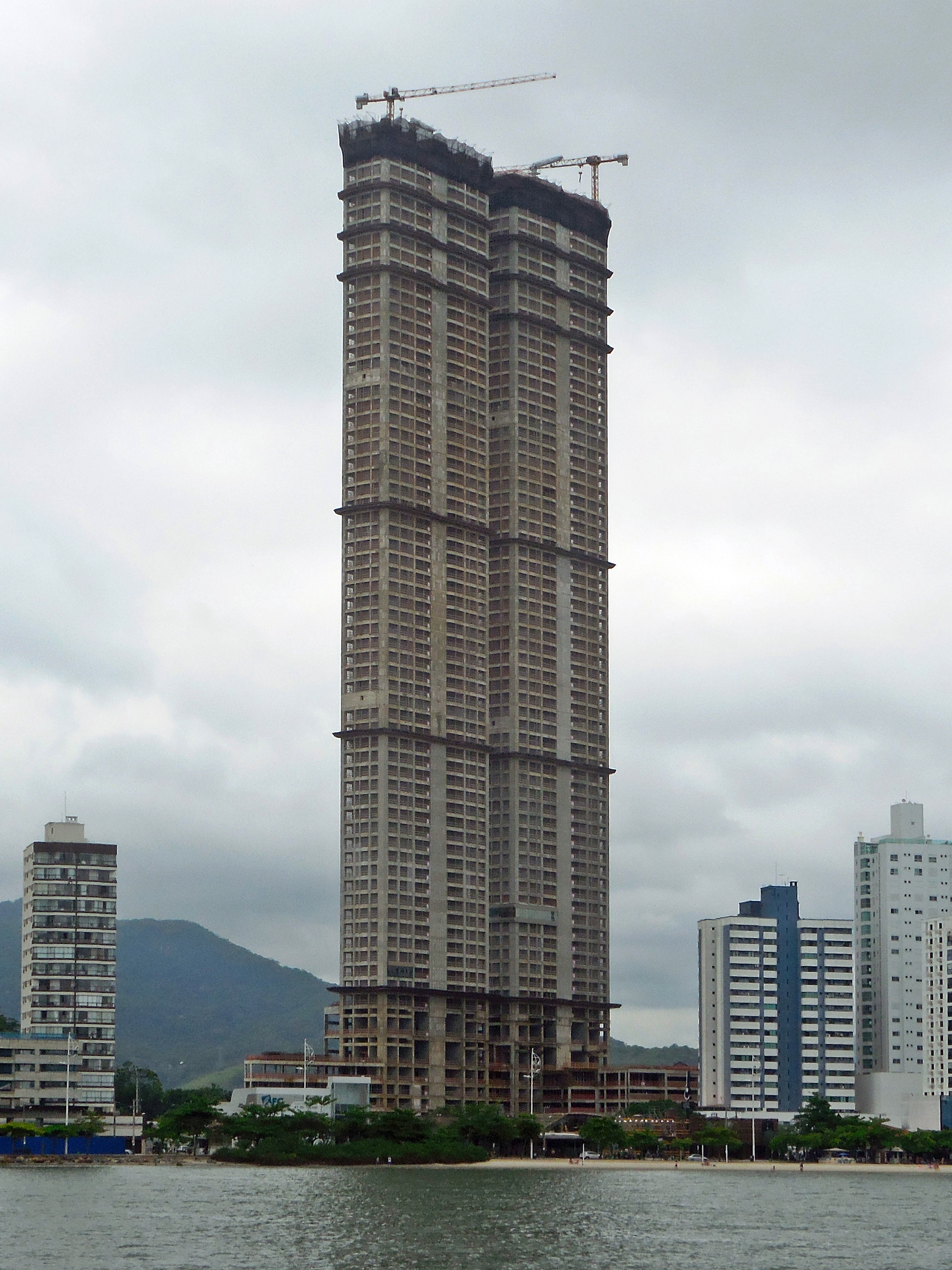
Yachthouse Residence Club under construction in December 2018

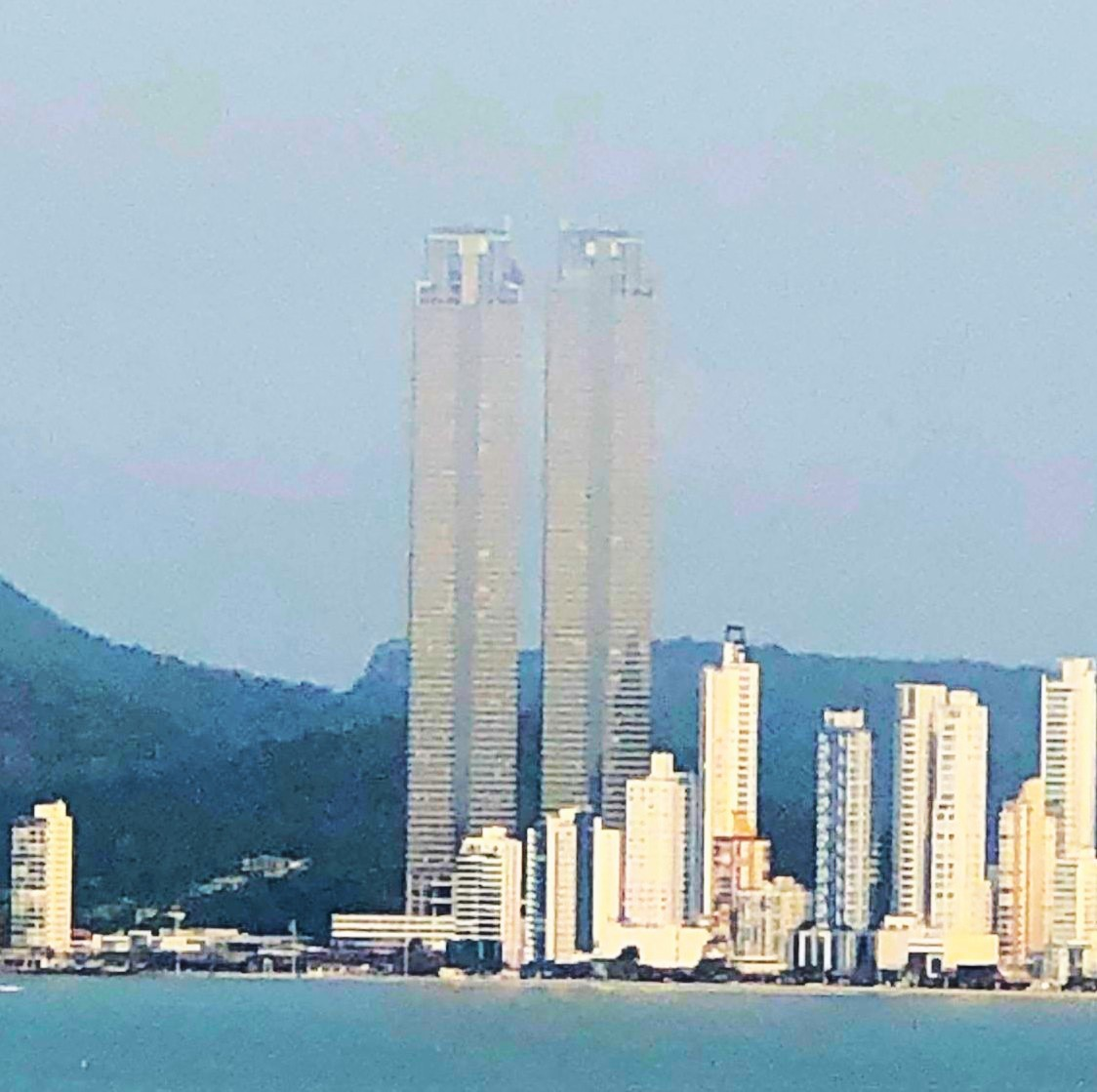
Yachthouse Residence Club under construction in August 2021

== See also ==
- Infinity Coast
- Millennium Palace
- List of tallest buildings in Brazil
- List of tallest buildings in South America

Records
Preceded by One Tower	Tallest building in Brazil; 294 m (965 ft); 2023–present	Succeeded by Incumbent
