= Cristo Luz =

Monument in Balneário Camboriú, Brazil

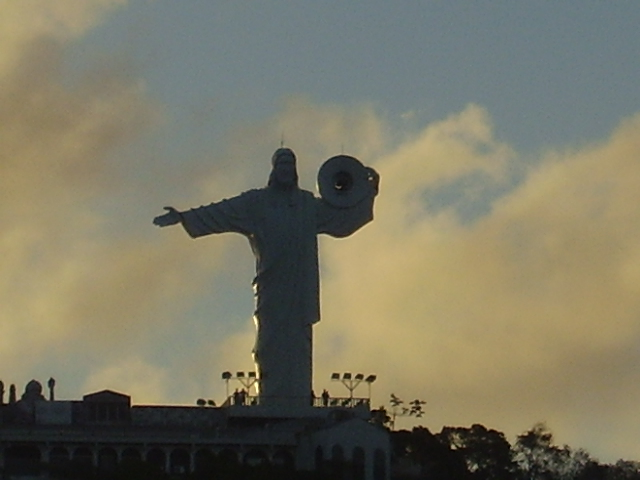
Cristo Luz during sunset. It is the second-tallest monument in Brazil and stands 33 meters high atop Morro da Cruz.

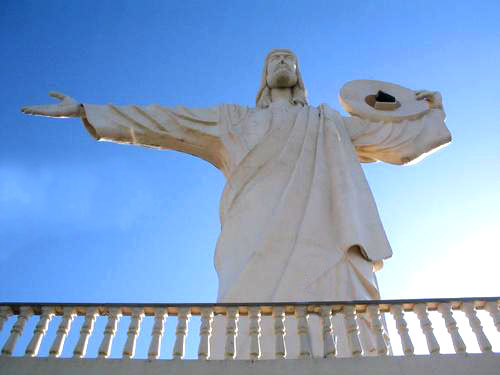
A view of the Cristo Luz at its tourist complex.

Christ Light (Portuguese: Cristo Luz) is a monumental statue of Jesus Christ in the Brazilian municipality of Balneário Camboriú.

Its design was inspired by the Christ the Redeemer statue in Rio de Janeiro, although Cristo Luz is five meters shorter (33 m tall). The statue portrays Jesus holding a circular broad-brimmed hat at his left shoulder. The hat symbolizes the sun, and it houses a spotlight which shines out over the city. Colorful lights illuminate the Cristo Luz at night, and it also has multicolored lights in its body that shift and change.

== See also ==
- List of statues of Jesus
