= Infinity Coast =

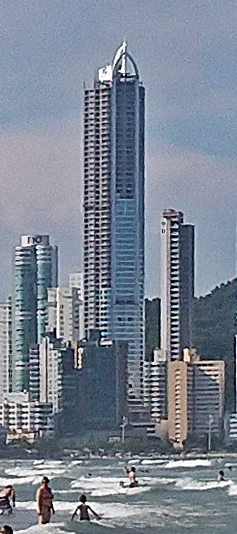
- Infinity Coast in 2018, when it was still under construction, as seen from Praia Central
- Interactive map of the Infinity Coast area

Record height
- Tallest in Brazil from 2019 to 2022^{[I]}

General information
- Type: Residential
- Location: Balneário Camboriú, Brazil, Rua Julieta Lins, 32
- Construction started: 2013
- Completed: 2019

Height
- Roof: 234.70 m (770 ft)

Technical details
- Floor count: 60+

Infinity Coast Tower is a residential condominium skyscraper in the coastal city of Balneário Camboriú, Santa Catarina, southern Brazil. At 234.7 metres (770 feet) and over 60 floors, it was the tallest building in Brazil until 2022, the year of completion of the One Tower, located in the same city. Construction of Infinity Coast started in 2013 and ended in 2019. The ones who conceived the project did not intend to build the country's tallest skyscraper.

== See also ==
- Yachthouse Residence Club
- Millennium Palace
- List of tallest buildings in Brazil
- List of tallest buildings in South America

Records
| Preceded by Orion Complex | Tallest building in Brazil; 234.7 m (770 ft); 2019–2022 | Succeeded by One Tower |
