= List of tallest buildings in Brazil =

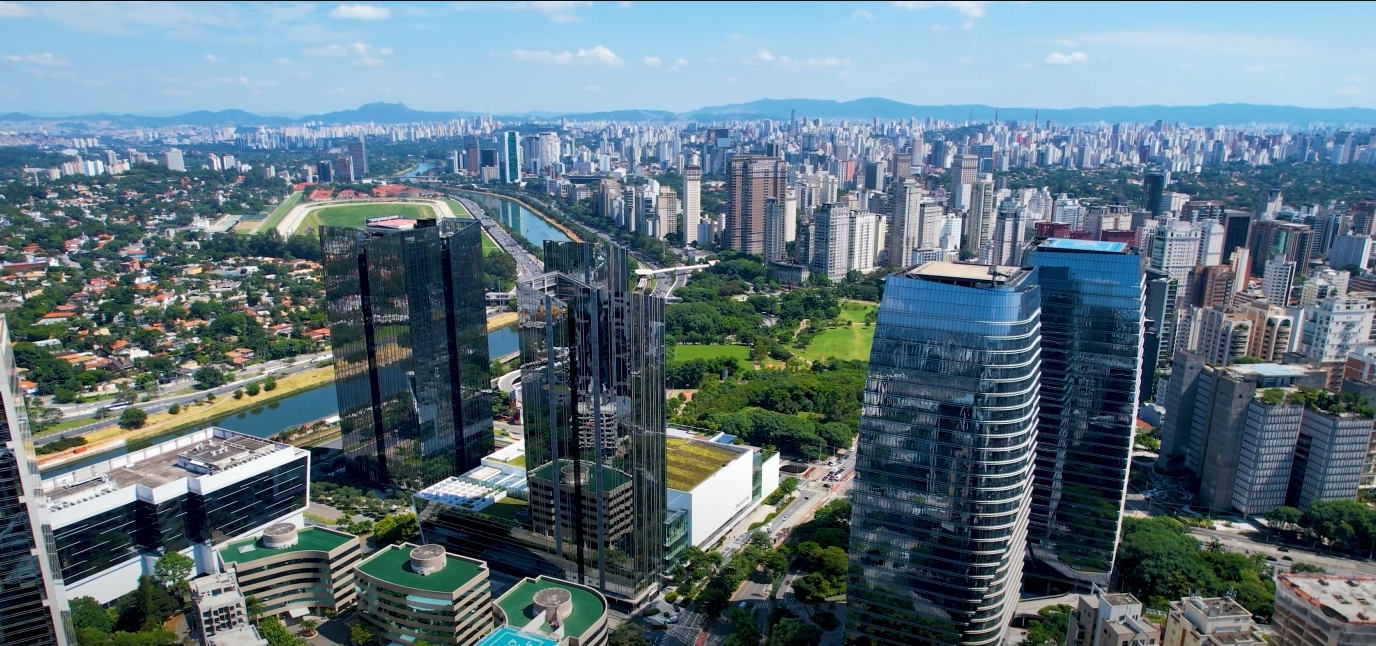
Skyline of São Paulo seen from the Itaim Bibi region. It is frequently listed by international publications as one of the most impressive, relevant and well-known skylines in the world.

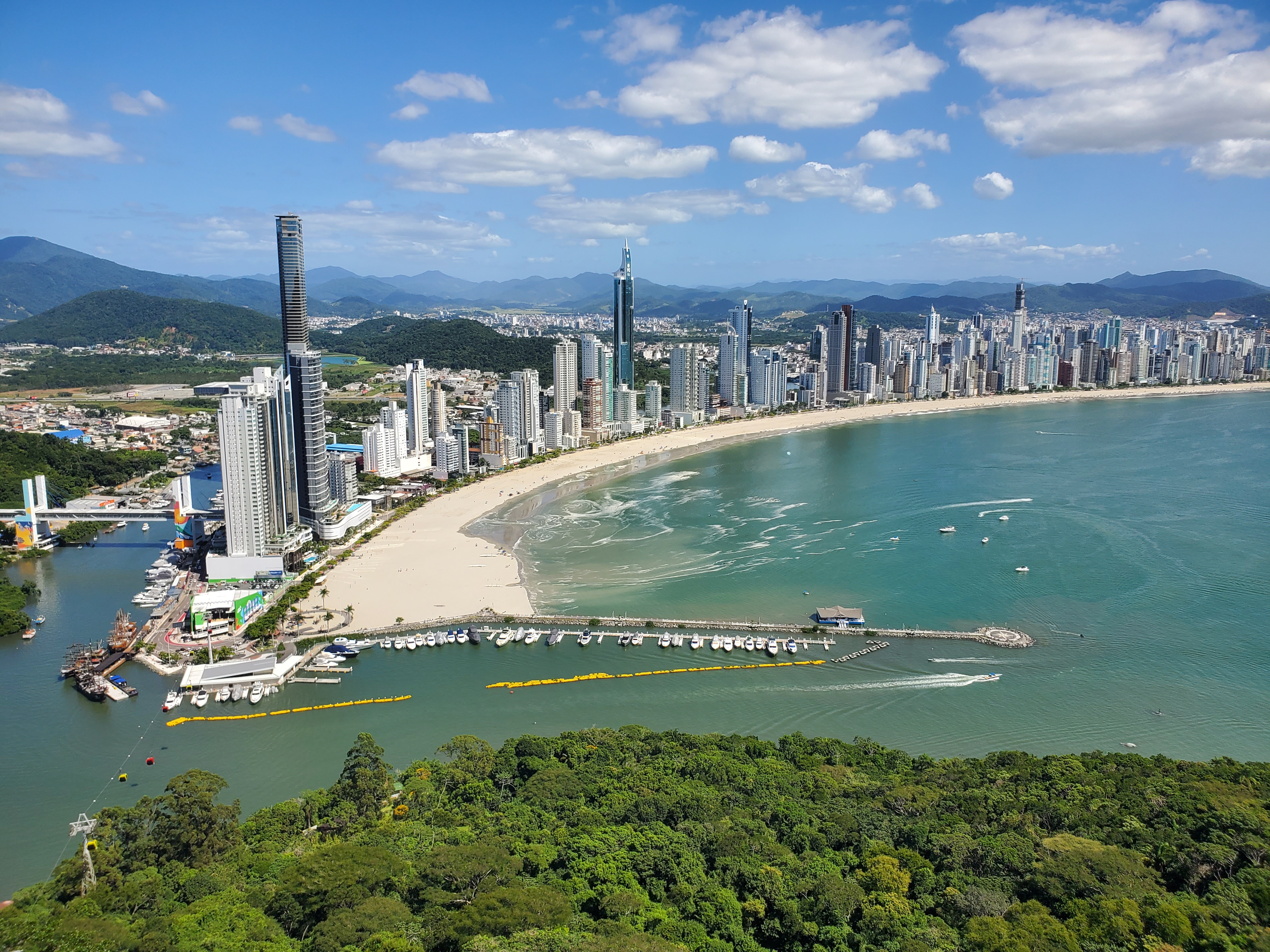
Skyline of Balneário Camboriú, which holds the tallest buildings in the country, all completed no earlier than 2014. Unlike São Paulo, Balneário Camboriú does not have strict zoning laws that forbid buildings from surpassing a certain height, allowing for more ambitious skyscraper projects to be implemented in the city.

According to Emporis, Brazil has five of the one hundred cities with the largest number of skyscrapers in the world: São Paulo, Goiânia, Rio de Janeiro, Recife and Balneário Camboriú. However, six of the ten tallest buildings in the country are currently located in Balneário Camboriú, in Santa Catarina. The first large building built in Brazil was the Sampaio Moreira, in São Paulo, in 1924. A Noite Building, in Rio de Janeiro, and the Martinelli Building, also in the capital of São Paulo, are considered the first skyscrapers in Latin America.

Subsequently, São Paulo dominated the national and international scene with the construction of buildings such as the Altino Arantes, which was the largest reinforced concrete construction in the world, and the Mirante do Vale, one of the first skyscrapers in the world to be built entirely in reinforced concrete and which remained the tallest building in the country from 1966 to 2014. At 294 m (965 ft), the twin towers Yachthouse Residence Club, in Balneário Camboriú, are the tallest buildings in Brazil, while the Alto das Nações, in São Paulo, is the tallest corporate tower in Brazil.

== Tallest buildings ==
Was the tallest building in Brazil upon completion
Indicates buildings still under construction that have been architecturally topped out but not yet fully opened

Rank	Name	Image	Municipality	State	Height (m)	Floors	Year of completion	Architecture	Note
1	Yachthouse Residence Club Torre 2		Balneário Camboriú	(Santa Catarina (state)) Santa Catarina	294,1	81	2021	Pasqualotto & GT Pininfarina	
2	Yachthouse Residence Club Torre 1		Balneário Camboriú	(Santa Catarina (state)) Santa Catarina	294	81	2021	Pasqualotto & GT Pininfarina	
3	One Tower		Balneário Camboriú	(Santa Catarina (state)) Santa Catarina	290	84	2022	_	
4	Boreal Tower		Balneário Camboriú	(Santa Catarina (state)) Santa Catarina	241	55	2025	_	
5	Infinity Coast		Balneário Camboriú	(Santa Catarina (state)) Santa Catarina	234	66	2019	_	
6	Alto das Nações		São Paulo	(São Paulo (state)) São Paulo	>219	-	2025	WTorre	
7	Complexo Orion		Goiânia	Goiás	191	50	2018	MKZ Arquitetura	
8	Epic Tower		Balneário Camboriú	(Santa Catarina (state)) Santa Catarina	191	55	2016		
9	Tour Geneve		(João Pessoa, Paraíba) João Pessoa	Paraíba	183	51	2018	_	
10	Millennium Palace		Balneário Camboriú	(Santa Catarina (state)) Santa Catarina	177	46	2014	Eugênio Nelson e Renato Ammann	
11	New York Apartments		Balneário Camboriú	(Santa Catarina (state)) Santa Catarina	176	51	2021		
12	Kingdom Park Vaca Brava		Goiânia	Goiás	175	52	2020		
13	Splendia Tower		Balneário Camboriú	(Santa Catarina (state)) Santa Catarina	175	?	2019		
14	Copenhagen		Balneário Camboriú	(Santa Catarina (state)) Santa Catarina	173	?	2022		
15	Concórdia Corporate		Nova Lima	Minas Gerais	172	44	2017	Dávila Arquitetura	
15	Platina 220		São Paulo	(São Paulo (state)) São Paulo	172	40	2022	Königsberger Vannucchi	
17	Mirante do Vale		São Paulo	(São Paulo (state)) São Paulo	170	51	1966	Waldomiro Zarzur	
18	Residencial Figueira Altos do Tatuapé		São Paulo	(São Paulo (state)) São Paulo	168	52	2021	J.J. Abraão	
19	Edifício Itália		São Paulo	(São Paulo (state)) São Paulo	165	46	1965	Franz Heep	
20	Império das Ondas		Balneário Camboriú	(Santa Catarina (state)) Santa Catarina	165	49	2016		
21	Villa Serena Torre A Villa Serena Torre B		Balneário Camboriú	(Santa Catarina (state)) Santa Catarina	164	49	2012	Ivo Peretto Filho	
22	Rio Sul Center		Rio de Janeiro	(Rio de Janeiro (state)) Rio de Janeiro	163	48	1982	Ulysses Petrônio Burlamaqui	
23	Edifício Altino Arantes		São Paulo	(São Paulo (state)) São Paulo	161	40	1947	Plínio Botelho do Amaral	
24	Parque Cidade Jardim		São Paulo	(São Paulo (state)) São Paulo	158	41	2008 (Note: Some buildings were opened in 2008, others only in 2010)	Pablo Slemenson	
25	Centro Empresarial Nações Unidas - Torre Norte		São Paulo	(São Paulo (state)) São Paulo	157	38	1999	Alberto Botti e Marc Rubin	
26	Edifício American Diamond		Cuiabá	Mato Grosso	155	36	2019		
27	Brascan Century Plaza		Barueri	(São Paulo (state)) São Paulo	154	38	2012	Königsberger Vannucchi	
28	Residencial Alfredo Volpi		(João Pessoa, Paraíba) João Pessoa	Paraíba	152	47	2016		
29	Universe Life Square		Curitiba	(Paraná (state)) Paraná	152	44	2014	Koningsberger e Vanucci Arquitetos	
30	Residencial São Cristóvão		Lajeado	Rio Grande do Sul	151	40	2024		
31	Jardim do Mar 1		Praia Grande	(São Paulo (state)) São Paulo	150	43	2017		
31	Jardim do Mar 2		Praia Grande	(São Paulo (state)) São Paulo	150	43	2017		
32	Altto Vila Madalena		São Paulo	(São Paulo (state)) São Paulo	150	43	2021		
33	W Residences		São Paulo	(São Paulo (state)) São Paulo	150	42	2022	HBR Realty	
34	Noah Residence		Itapema	(Santa Catarina (state)) Santa Catarina	150	42	2023		
35	Edifício Josephine		São Paulo	(São Paulo (state)) São Paulo	150	41	2014		
36	Evolution Corporate		Barueri	(São Paulo (state)) São Paulo	150	36	2012		
37	EZ Towers		São Paulo	(São Paulo (state)) São Paulo	150	32	2016		

== Under construction ==
Rank	Name	Municipality	State	Height (m)	Floors	Opening
1	Senna Tower	Balneário Camboriú	(Santa Catarina (state)) Santa Catarina	544	154	-
2	Embraed Armani Casa	Balneário Camboriú	(Santa Catarina (state)) Santa Catarina	270	78	-
3	Niraj Towers	Rondonópolis	Mato Grosso	250	62	-
4	Titanium Tower	Balneário Camboriú	(Santa Catarina (state)) Santa Catarina	238	54	2027
5	VR Tower	Itapema	(Santa Catarina (state)) Santa Catarina	237	60	2026
6	Vitra by Pininfarina	Balneário Camboriú	(Santa Catarina (state)) Santa Catarina	222	-	-
7	Sweden	Itapema	(Santa Catarina (state)) Santa Catarina	220	60	2030
8	Sapphire Tower	Balneário Camboriú	(Santa Catarina (state)) Santa Catarina	215	-	-
9	Cyrela Pininfarina Rebouças	São Paulo	(São Paulo (state)) São Paulo	210	-	-
10	One Innovation	São Paulo	(São Paulo (state)) São Paulo	209	-	-
10	One Innovation 2	São Paulo	(São Paulo (state)) São Paulo	209	-	-
11	Vista Cyrela By Armani	São Paulo	(São Paulo (state)) São Paulo	206	55	2028
12	Vista Cyrela Furnished Casa/Armani	São Paulo	(São Paulo (state)) São Paulo	206	55	2028
13	L’Atelier Concept Homes	Itapema	(Santa Catarina (state)) Santa Catarina	195	61	2027
14	Baalbek	Cuiabá	Mato Grosso	183	50	2024
15	Residencial Liége	(João Pessoa, Paraíba) João Pessoa	Paraíba	177	54	-
16	Parque Global	São Paulo	(São Paulo (state)) São Paulo	173	49	2027
17	Wave Beira Mar	Fortaleza	Ceará	171	46	2026
18	Vogue Square Garden	Ponta Grossa	(Paraná (state)) Paraná	170	50	2025
19	One Residence	Fortaleza	Ceará	166	50	2024
20	Sky Residencial	Fortaleza	Ceará	162	45	2027
21	Edifício Epic	Fortaleza	Ceará	161	50	2026
22	Taj Home Resort	Vila Velha	Espírito Santo	158	51	2026
23	Residencial Navegantes	Santos	(São Paulo (state)) São Paulo	155	45	-
24	Raízes SB	Sinop	Mato Grosso	153	42	2027
25	Torre Bela Vista	São Paulo	(São Paulo (state)) São Paulo	152	43	2025

== See also ==
- List of tallest buildings in Balneário Camboriú
- List of tallest buildings in São Paulo
- List of tallest buildings in South America
