= Orion Complex Goiânia =

Skyscraper in Goiânia, Brazil

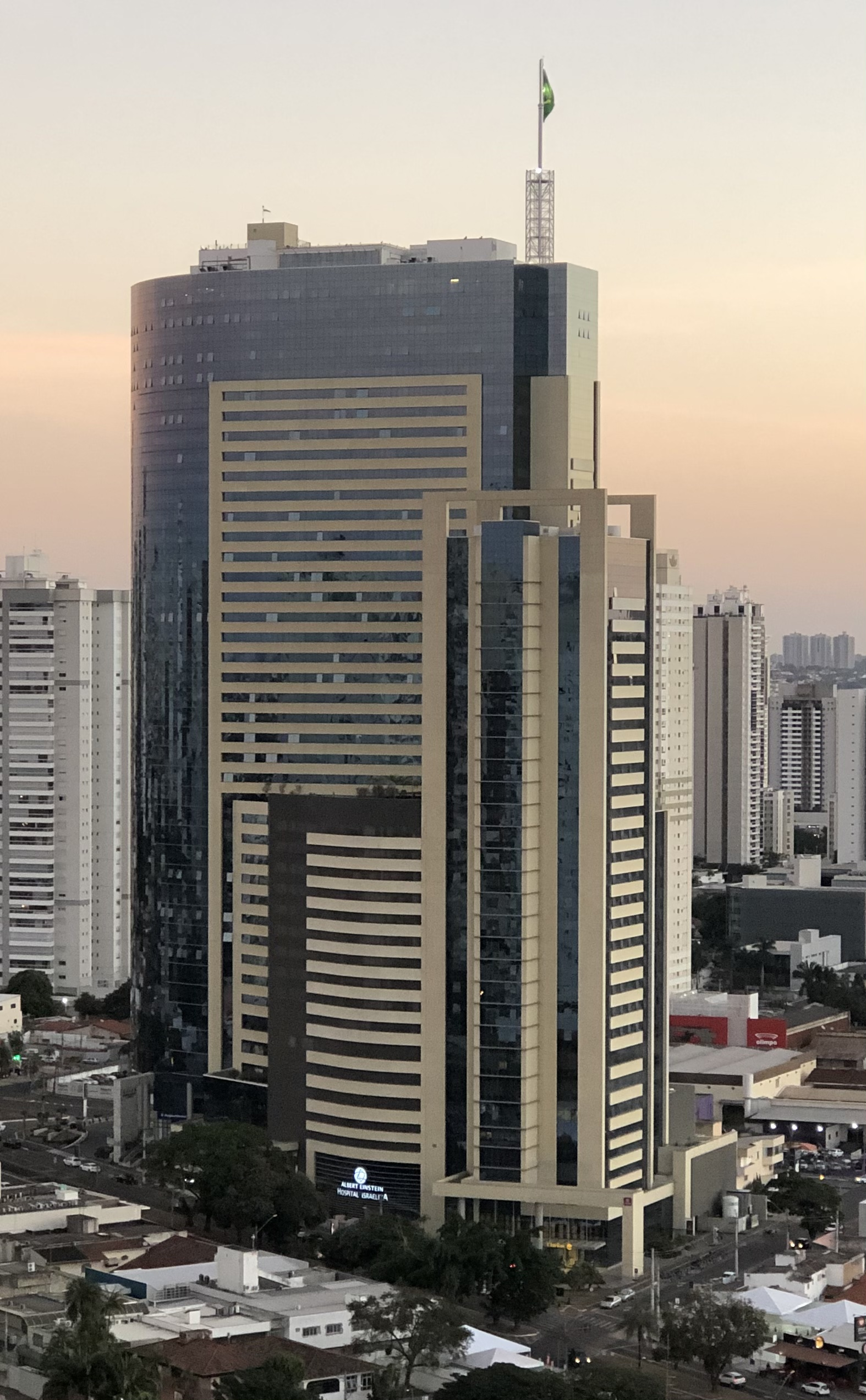

General information
- Status: Completed
- Type: Mixed-use: office, hotel, hospital, retail
- Location: Goiânia, Brazil, 1148 Av. Portugal, St. Marista, Goiânia
- Coordinates: 16.69684°S 49.26962°W
- Construction started: 2013
- Completed: 2018

Height
- Roof: 191.5 m (628 ft)

Technical details
- Structural system: Concrete
- Floor count: 44 (+2 underground)

Design and construction
- Architect: MKZ Arquitetura
- Developer: FR Incorporadora
- Structural engineer: GVC Engineering; FR Incorporadora; Tropical Urbanism; Joule Engineering

Website
- Orion Complex Goiânia

The Orion Complex Goiânia is a mixed-use skyscraper in Goiânia, Brazil. Built between 2013 and 2018, the tower stands at 191.5 m (628 ft) tall with 44 floors and is the current 4th tallest building in Brazil.

== History ==
=== Architecture ===
The building began construction in March 2014, with 550 workers. The total cost of the project was estimated at R$350 million, with 124.7 thousand m^{2} built. The building can be seen from various points in Goiânia within a radius of approximately 10 km, with a Brazilian flag measuring 5.85 meters high and 8.35 meters wide.

Among the institutions in the building are: Goiás Medical Association (AMG), the Medical Museum and the Medical Conciliation Court. At the end of 2018, the hospital was scheduled to start operating in the building, with 200 normal beds and 40 humanized ICU beds and 12 surgical centers.

== See also ==
- List of tallest buildings in Brazil
- List of tallest buildings in South America
- International Trade Center (Salvador, Brazil)

Records
Preceded by Tour Geneve	Tallest building in Brazil; 191.5 m (628 ft); 2018–2019	Succeeded by Infinity Coast
