= Senna Tower =

Skyscraper in Balneário Camboriú, Brazil

- Artist's impression of the tower
- Alternative names: Triumph Tower (original name)

General information
- Status: Under construction
- Type: Residential skyscraper
- Architectural style: Neo-futurism
- Location: Balneário Camboriú, Brazil
- Coordinates: 27°00′17″S 48°37′01″W
- Cost: US$545 million

Height
- Architectural: 544 m (1,785 ft)

Technical details
- Structural system: Concrete frame
- Floor count: 153
- Lifts/elevators: 8

Design and construction
- Architect: Lalalli Senna
- Developer: FG Empreendimentos and Senna family
- Structural engineer: WSP Global; FG Empreendimentos
- Services engineer: Franzmann Engenharia

Website
- Official website

The Senna Tower is an under construction supertall residential skyscraper in Balneário Camboriú, Brazil. The tower will be the first residential building in Latin America to use the tuned mass damper (TMD) technology to reduce oscillations of the wind, and is the world's first supertall residential building certified with the Platinum Leadership in Energy and Environmental Design. Once completed, the building will be by far the tallest in Brazil.

== Background ==
Announced on September 17, 2024, by FG Empreendimentos and Senna family, the building will be situated along the Atlantic Avenue in the Balneário Camboriú's beach. With a planned height of 544 m (1,785 ft) tall and 154 floors, at completion it will be one of the tallest structures in the world and become the first or the second tallest residential building in the world pending the final height of the Burj Binghatti Jacob & Co Residences in Dubai, in addition to being the tallest building outside Asia.

The project that already received architectural and construction authorizations by the local prefecture, was designed solely as a residential tower, with privative apartments in addition to a skyline observation point, heated pool, wellness center, gym, tennis courts, entertainment, leisure and gastronomy areas open to the public and an immersive educational space about the former Formula One racer champion Ayrton Senna.

The project was idealized in 2019, under the former name Triumph Tower with 204 units of apartments and 24 duplex and triplex in different sizes.

The project broke ground in the second half of 2025.

== See also ==
- List of tallest buildings in the world
- List of tallest buildings in Brazil
- List of tallest buildings in Balneario Camboriu
- List of tallest residential buildings
