= Aureliano Chaves building =

Commercial skyscraper in Belo Horizonte, Brazil

Edifício Aureliano Chaves
- Edifício Aureliano Chaves
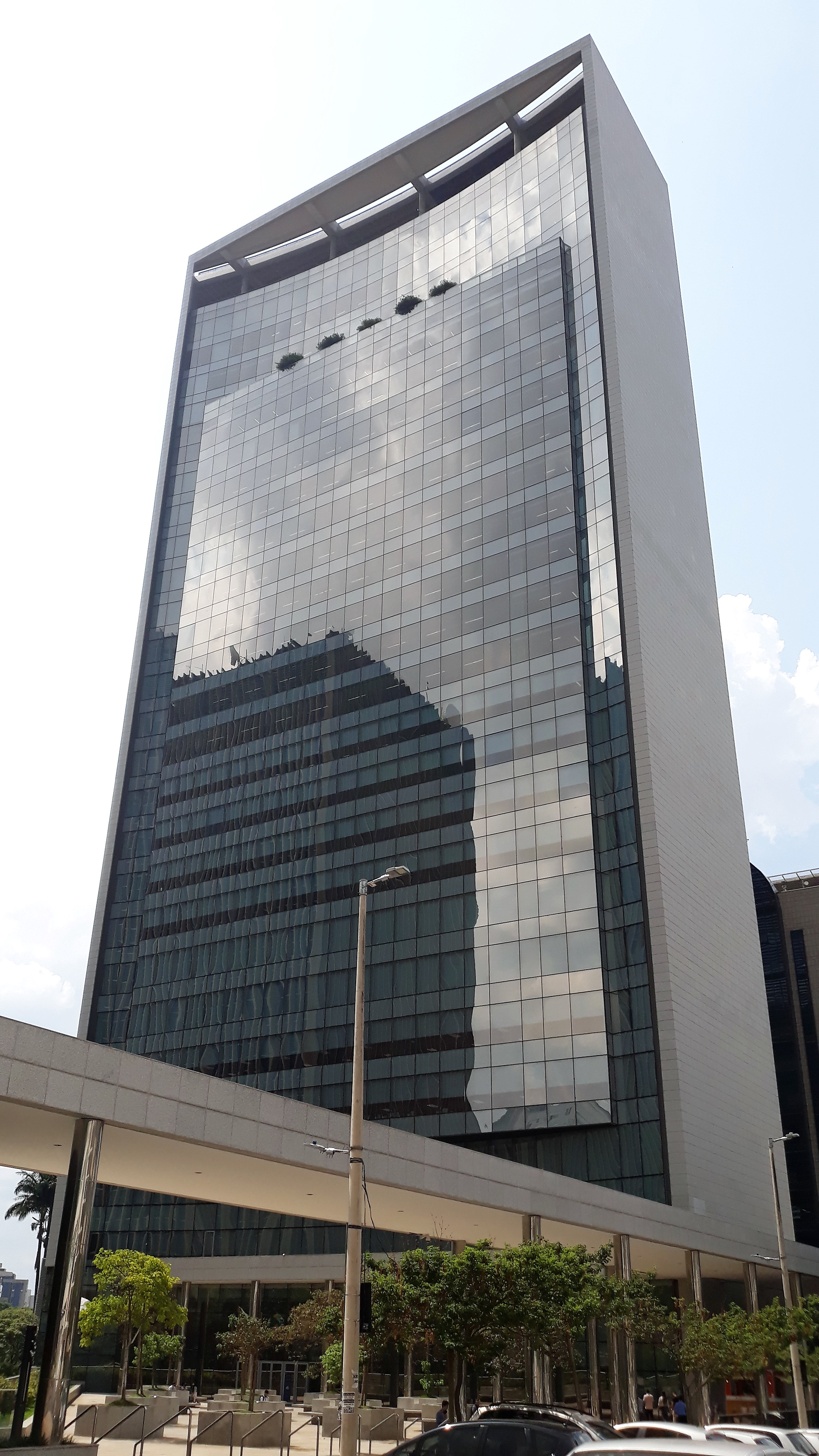
- The building's main facade
- Interactive map of the Edifício Aureliano Chaves area
- Alternative names: Forluz Building

General information
- Type: Commercial building
- Location: Belo Horizonte, Brazil
- Named for: Aureliano Chaves
- Completed: 2014
- Opened: 2014
- Owner: Forluz

Height
- Height: 121.1 m (397 ft)

Technical details
- Floor count: 30 levels, including five basement levels

Design and construction
- Architects: Gustavo Penna; Gustavo Penna Arquiteto & Associados and Trínia Arquitetura

The Aureliano Chaves Building (Portuguese: Edifício Aureliano Chaves), also known as the Forluz Building, is a commercial building in Belo Horizonte, Minas Gerais, Brazil.

Designed by architect Gustavo Penna and Trínia Arquitetura, it was inaugurated in 2014 and is owned by Forluz, the pension fund for CEMIG employees.

With an architectural height of 121.1 m (397 ft), it is currently the tallest completed building in Belo Horizonte, slightly taller than the city's earlier Art Deco landmark, Edifício Acaiaca. The building is named after Aureliano Chaves, former governor of Minas Gerais and former vice-president of Brazil.

== Development ==
Forluz commissioned the building for use as a new headquarters for CEMIG, on a site next to the company's existing headquarters. A closed competition was held among invited architecture offices in Belo Horizonte. The partnership between Trínia Arquitetura and Gustavo Penna Arquiteto & Associados won the competition in 2007, and the project began the following year. Design approvals and construction took about six years, and the building opened in 2014.

== Architecture ==
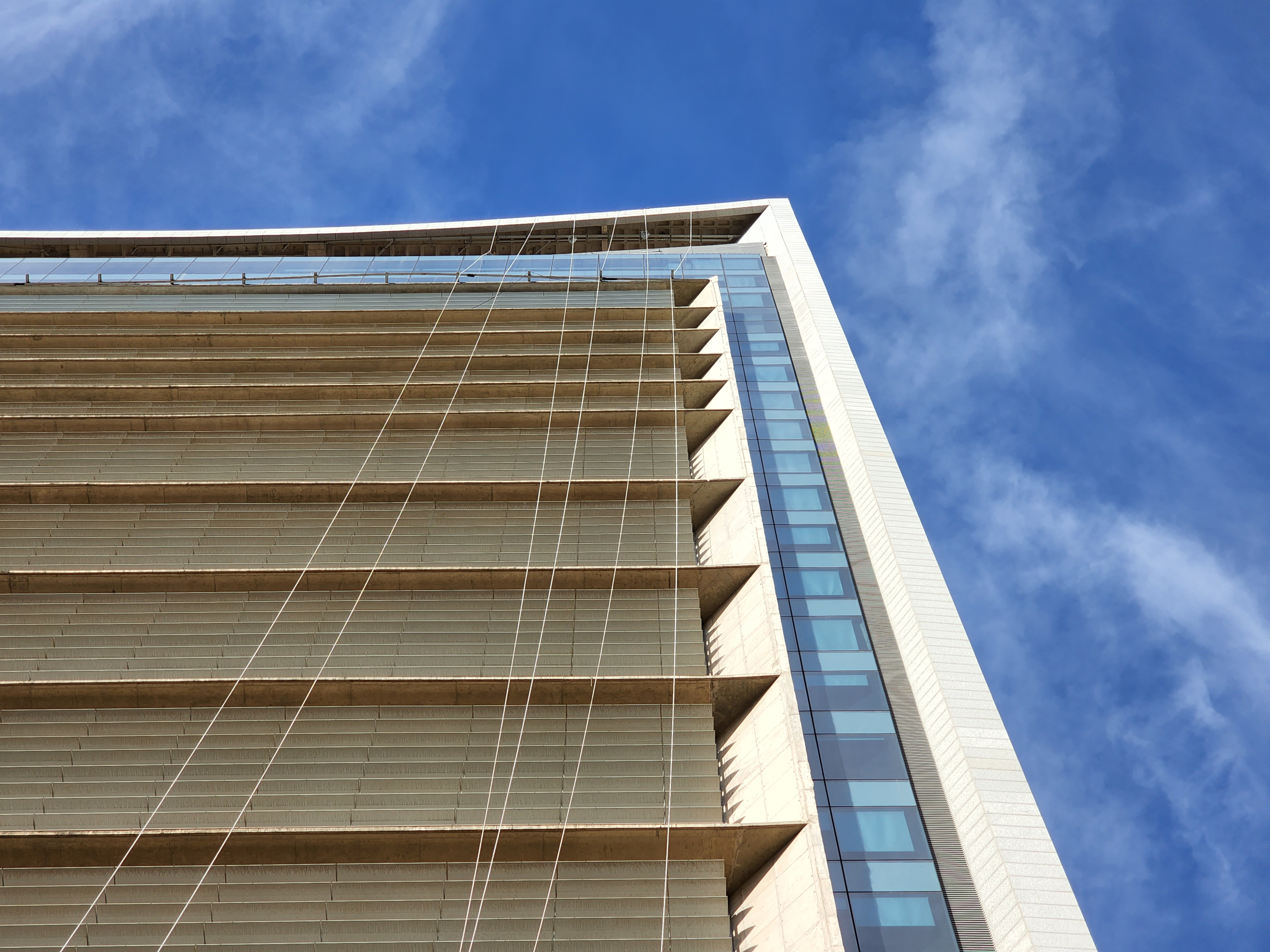
The northern facade of the Aureliano Chaves building, with horizontal brises soleil used to reduce direct sun while allowing natural light.

The Aureliano Chaves Building was designed with a strong emphasis on environmental performance. It became the first building in Minas Gerais to receive LEED Gold certification. The project received consulting support from Labcon, the Thermal Comfort Laboratory of the School of Architecture at the Federal University of Minas Gerais.

The building occupies a triangular block and is oriented along an east-west axis. The east and west ends, which receive stronger solar exposure, were designed as blind facades. The north and south facades use glazing to admit natural light, while the northern facade is protected by horizontal brises soleil that soften direct sunlight during the winter.

The sustainability work affected the design as it developed. Early evaluations gave the project a C rating for the building envelope, D for natural lighting and B for air conditioning, with an overall B rating expected. After revisions to the windows, envelope and finishing materials, the building reached A ratings in the evaluated systems. The added sustainability measures increased construction costs by about 7%, while projected savings reached 19% in energy use and 40% in water use.

== Usage ==
CEMIG initially occupied much of the building. After retirements and a voluntary separation program reduced the company's space needs, Forluz began leasing vacant floors to Banco Inter. The bank first leased space in the building in 2019 and, in 2021, signed an initial five-year contract for the whole tower.
