= Itapema =

- Municipality
- Municipality of Itapema
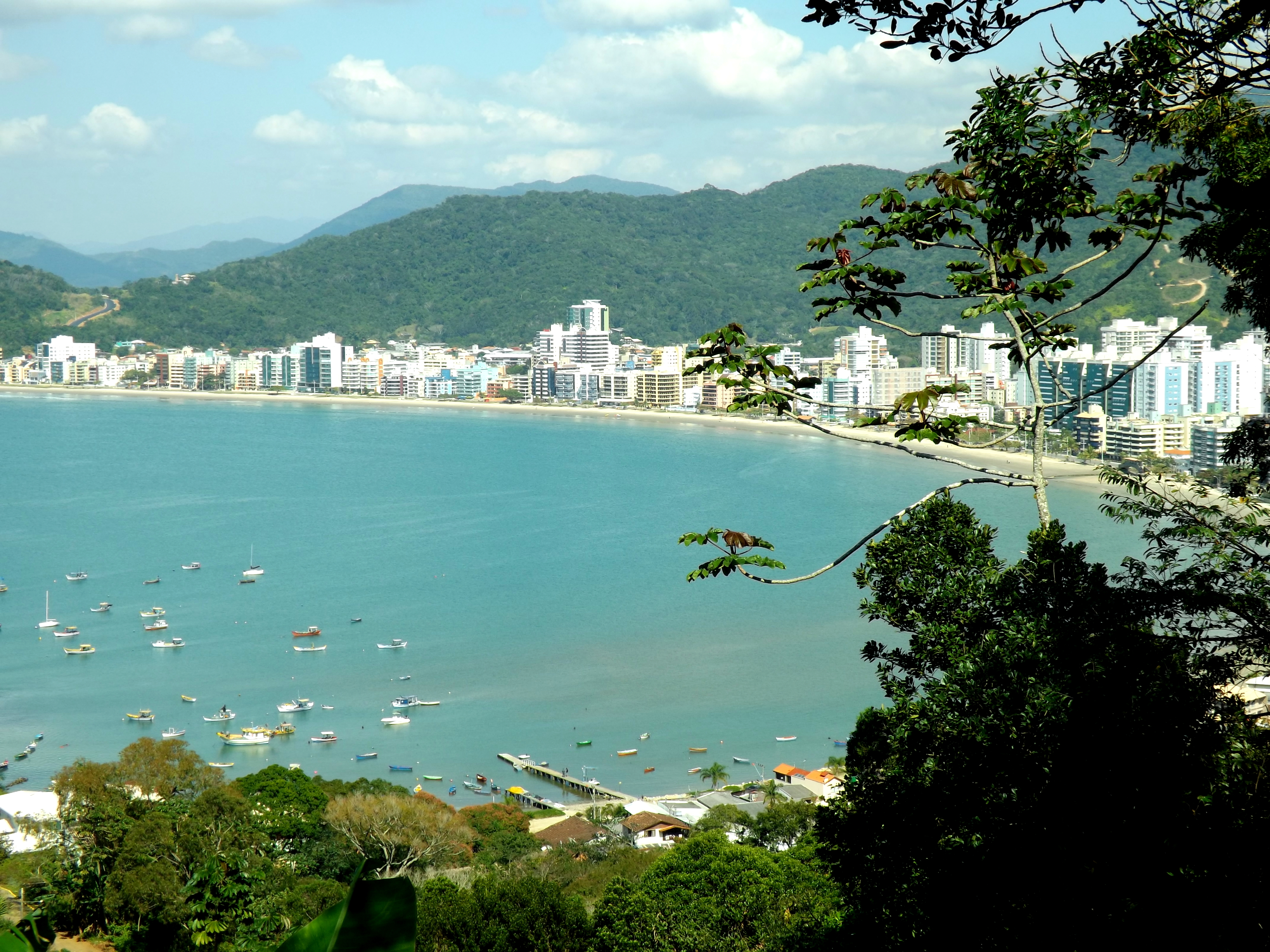
- one of Itapema's beaches

- Flag Coat of arms

- Location of Itapema

- Location within Brazil
- Coordinates: 27°05′24″S 48°36′39″W
- Country: Brazil
- Region: South
- State: Santa Catarina
- Founded: April 21, 1962

Government
  - Mayor: Alexandre Xepa (PL)

Area
  - Total: 59.022 km^{2} (22.789 sq mi)
- Elevation: 2 m (6.6 ft)

Population (2020)
  - Total: 67,338
  - Density: 776.22/km^{2} (2,010.4/sq mi)
- Time zone: UTC−3 (BRT)
- HDI (2010): 0.796 – high
- Website: itapema.sc.gov.br

Itapema is a city in Santa Catarina, Brazil.

== History ==
=== Colonization ===
The Azoreans already in the communities of São Miguel and Santo Antônio were responsible for the settlement of the bay of Porto Belo, where they helped found the parish of Porto Belo on December 18, 1824, later transformed into a village on October 13, 1832. The descendants of these immigrants, in the early 19th Century, populated the region of Itapema, giving its first administrative structure, on December 30, 1914, with the creation of its Police District.

It is known that in 1852, it was assumed that some 980 Portuguese and Azorean descendants already lived in areas of the current municipality of Itapema. This figure refers to the number of 51 mills of cassava flour and sugar. It was very common for families to have both types of mills.

Demographic growth until the mid-nineteenth century was slow. From the end of this century, Itapema receives immigrants of German, Italian, and Spanish origin who soon end up merging with the population of Azorean origin. These other people exercise little local cultural influence, since the festivities, such as the feast of the patroness - Our Lady of the Navigators - besides the games, such as Farra do Boi, Boi-de-Mamão and Cantorias do Terno-de-Reis and festivals of the Divine were brought and maintained by the Azoreans.

=== Names ===
The first denomination of Itapema was Vila de Santo Antônio de Lisboa or Tapera, a term that was related to the model of their dwellings. Its economy was based on subsistence, fishing on the coast, besides the planting of cassava and the production of flour, allied to the culture of other products such as corn, beans, coffee, rice, and watermelon.

=== Evolution ===
During the district phase, Itapema was incorporated in the city of Camboriú, from 1923 to 1925. With the population growth in the first half of the twentieth century, as well as economic importance, Itapema falls within the conditions to be considered a municipality in 1962. On January 31 of that same year, the first mayor elected in Itapema, Olegário Bernardes, was elected.

Since the 1980s, there has been significant growth in the country's housing sector. In line with what happens on a national scale, Itapema also presents an expansion of this sector, resulting in significant changes in the local landscape, linked to an acceleration of tourist flows, placing the municipality in the spotlight in the Santa Catarina scenario.

== Geography ==
Itapema can be accessed from highway BR-101 and it is surrounded by a rocky coastline. It's located on the north-central coast of Santa Catarina state. The city has waterfalls and hills. The vegetation is composed of restinga and Atlantic forests.

== Buildings ==
Five hundred thousand square meters of civil construction projects were built in Itapema between 2003 and 2005. Three million and five hundred thousand square meters of construction were approved by the city administration in 2023, mainly condos.

== Tourism ==
Itapema is the third most popular tourist destination in Santa Catarina. The beaches are the biggest tourist attraction and the Meia Praia, or Middle Beach of Itapema, is the longest. Itapema has six beaches: Canto da Praia, Costão, Meia Praia, Ilhota, Central and Praia Grossa.

Known as the Ultralight Capital, Itapema has annually the Ultralight Encounter held in the city, the event is a success and attracts thousands of aviation fans. The Pilots Association of Itapema prepares several surprises for the day of the meeting, such as radical maneuvers, aircraft exhibitions, flight raffles, acrobatics, parachuting, aeromodelling, and flying over the city, among other attractions.
