= Balneário Camboriú =

Municipality in Santa Catarina, Brazil

- Municipality
- Municipality of Balneário Camboriú
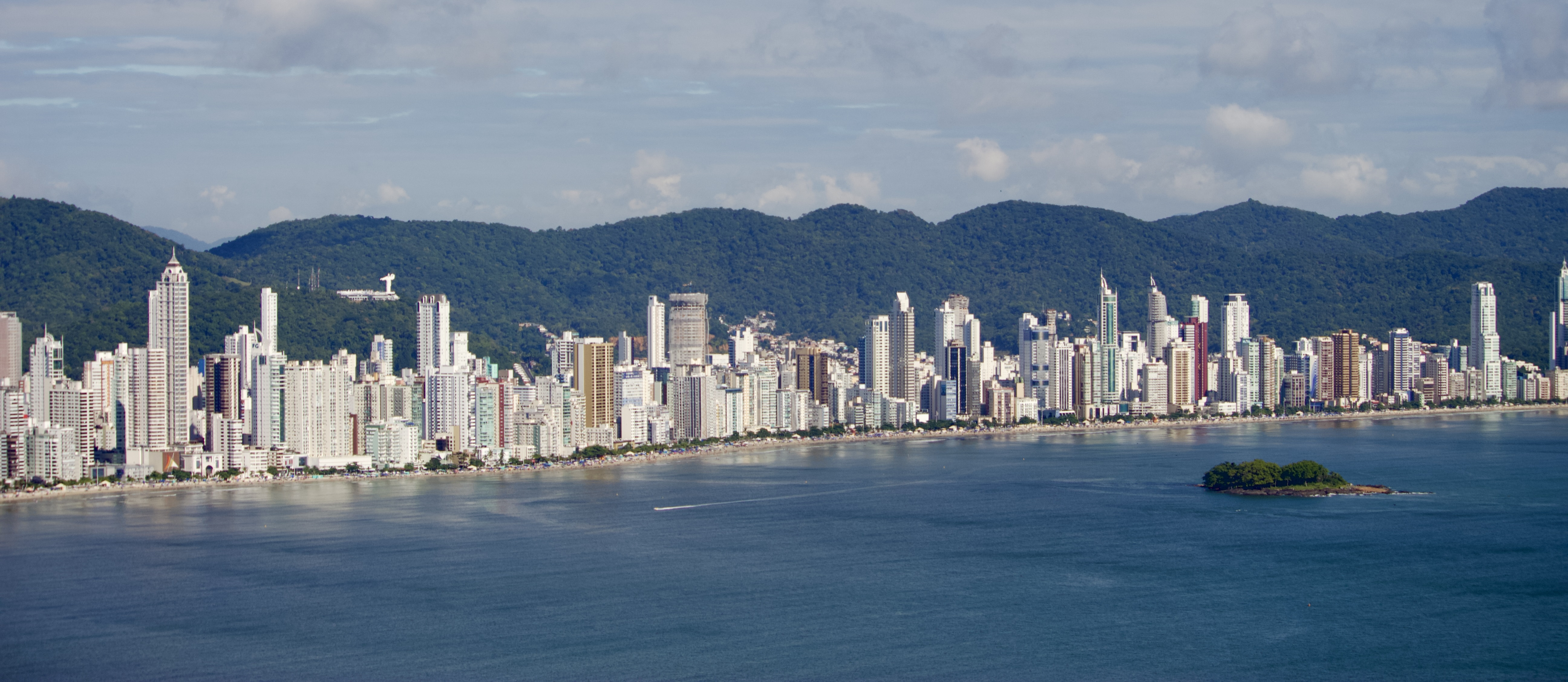
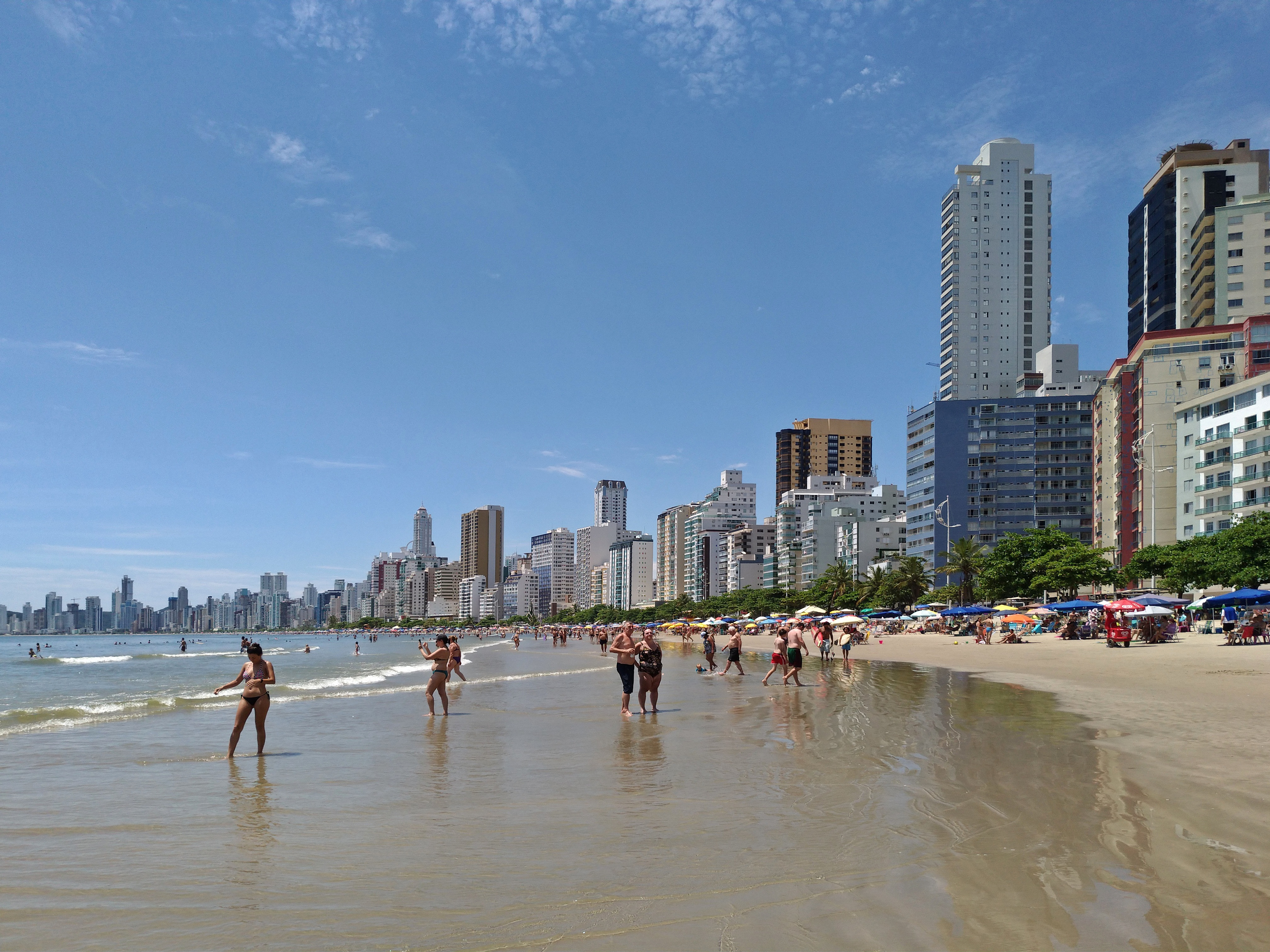
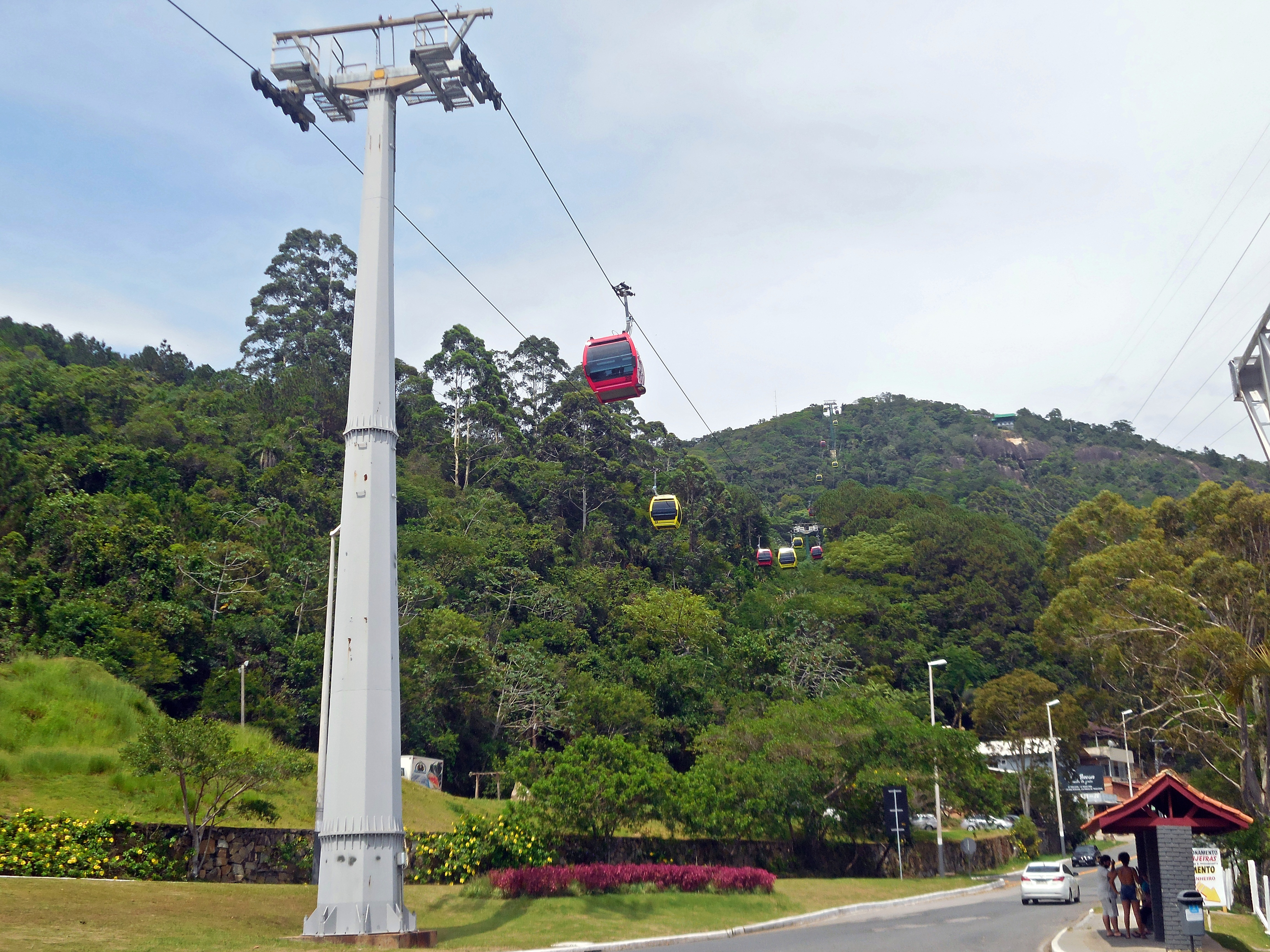
- Skyline of Balneário Camboriú Praia Central Parque Unipraias cable car

- Flag Coat of arms

- Location of Balneário Camboriú

- Location within Brazil
- Coordinates: 26°59′43″S 48°38′08″W
- Country: Brazil
- Region: Southern
- State: Santa Catarina
- Incorporated: July 20, 1964

Government
  - Mayor: Juliana Pavan (PSD)

Area
  - Municipality: 46 km^{2} (18 sq mi)
- Elevation: 2 m (6.6 ft)

Population (2022 Census)
  - Municipality: 139,155
  - Estimate (2025): 151,674
  - Density: 3,025/km^{2} (7,830/sq mi)
  - Metro: 390,990
- Time zone: UTC−3 (BRT)
  - Summer (DST): -3
- Postal Code: 88330-000
- Area code: +55 47
- HDI (2010): 0.845 – very high
- Website: www.bc.sc.gov.br

Balneário Camboriú (Portuguese pronunciation: [bawneˈaɾju kɐ̃boɾiˈu]) is a coastal city in the southern Brazilian state of Santa Catarina. The city is built on steep hills which drop down to the sea. It is a popular tourist destination for South Americans, who are drawn to its main ocean boulevard Avenida Atlântica (Atlantic Avenue), and who swell the city's population from 139,155 (2022 Census) to over one million in the summer. The city is famous for its unique beach-to-beach cable car which links its central beach with the beach of Laranjeiras. Balneário Camboriú is located 10 km (6.2 mi) south of the city of Itajaí, 96 km (60 mi) south of the city of Joinville, and 80 km (50 mi) north of the state capital, Florianópolis.

The city is served by Ministro Victor Konder International Airport located in the adjoining municipality of Navegantes.

The original meaning of the city's name is unknown. According to the city's archives, it is "River filled with Snook (Robalo)", which is a very common type of fish in this region. Ilha das Cabras (Goats' Island) is directly opposite the city and is too small for habitation but it is lit at night. Visitors to nearby Laranjeiras Beach can sail there aboard 17th century-style pirate ships, going around Ilha das Cabras before returning to Balneário Camboriú. The city also has a statue similar to Rio de Janeiro's Cristo Redentor (Christ the Redeemer). Standing atop the Morro da Cruz, Cristo Luz (Christ Light) portrays Jesus holding a circular "broad-brimmed hat" at his left shoulder, symbolizing the sun, and which houses a spotlight that shines out over the city. The Cristo Luz at 33 meters tall is only five meters shorter than the Redeemer and colorful lights both within and without the statue give it nighttime illumination. Another common sight in the city are paragliders over the beach, alongside the tall buildings, from the gliderport in Praia dos Amores. To the west the city is bordered by the Camboriú River, which joins the ocean at the southern edge of the center of the city, where the cable car (teleférico) rises from the central beach.

The city has been called the "Brazilian Dubai", due to its high number of skyscrapers and affluent tourists.

== History ==
The indigenous Tupi-Guaraní tribe first inhabited the region. Europeans settled in the area in 1758 when a few families from Porto Belo moved to a site they called Our Lady of Bon Sucesso and is now known as Barra. Francisco Garcia and his family and their slaves lived nearby, from which the village became known as Garcia. Baltasar Pinto Corrêa came from the Azores and was also an early settler. These were followed by groups of Germans who came from the valleys of the Itajal and Blumenauin, in search of fertile land. They built the church of Our Lady of Good Success and they founded the town of Bom Sucesso. In 1848 it became a district of the city of Itajaí, until it was detached in 1884. In 1930, the privileged geographical location began to be preferred by vacationing oceangoers, and two years later the town's first hotel was built at the confluence of Central and Atlantic Avenues. In 1964, the district earned autonomy under the toponym Balneário de Camboriú, which was amended in 1979 to Balneário Camboriú.

There are two version of the origin of the toponym Camboriú. One claims that the residents used the expression "camba the river" due to a sharp bend in the river near its mouth (cambar is a Portuguese verb that can mean to sharply change direction). Another idea was proposed by the local priest Raulin Reitz, who said that the maps of old indicated the name Rio Camboriú before Europeans had settled in the area, and that the toponym Camboriú comes from the Tupi language, formed by the agglutination of Camboriú and -u.

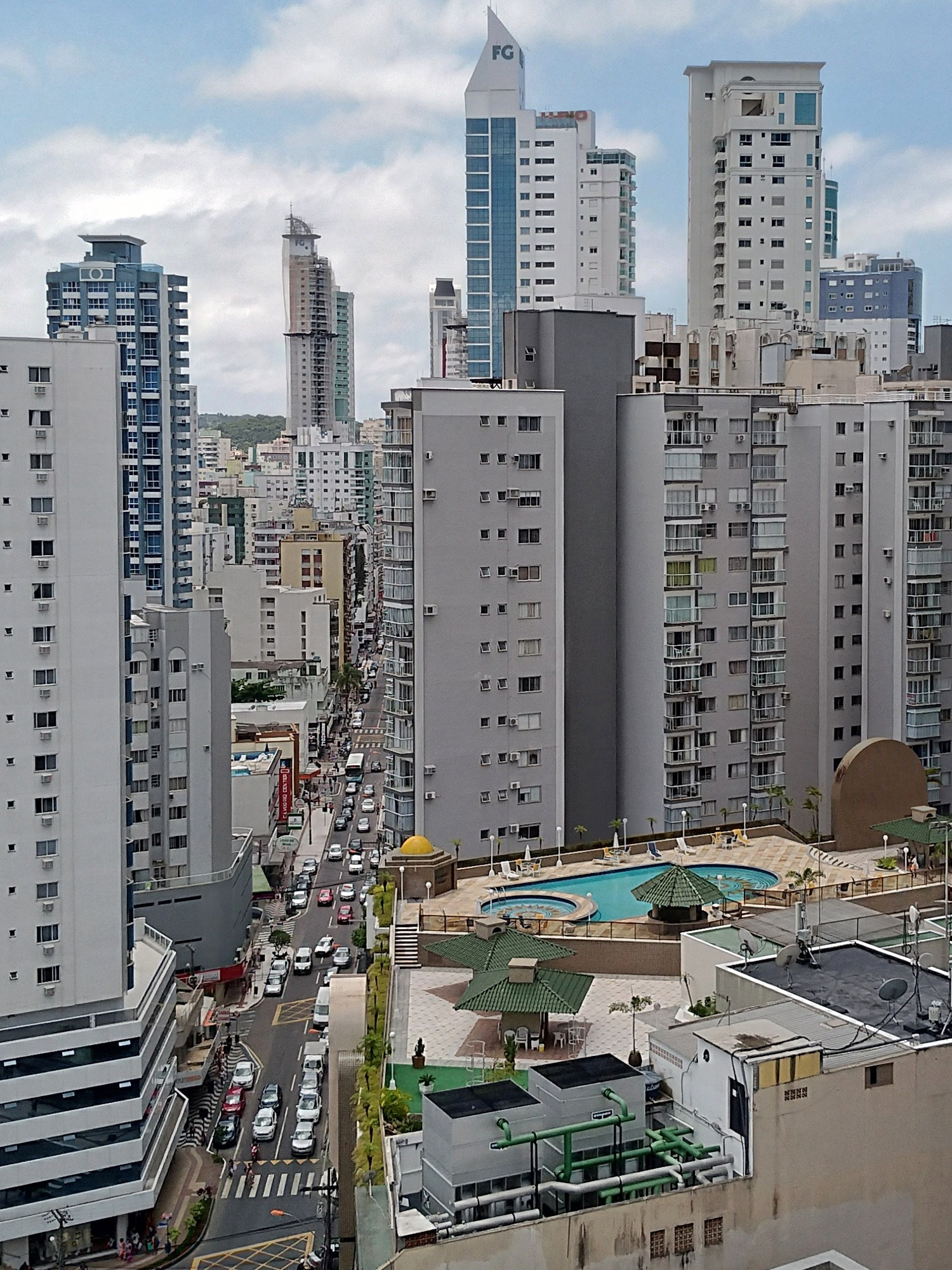
Avenida Brasil (Brasil Avenue) in Balneário Camboriú.

== Demographics ==
Historical population
Year	Pop.	±%
1970	10,839	—
1980	21,854	+101.6%
1991	40,308	+84.4%
2000	73,455	+82.2%
2010	108,089	+47.1%
2022	139,155	+28.7%

=== Ethnicity ===
The region was first colonized by settlers from the Azores, but the majority of the population of Balneário Camboriú is of German descent.

Color / Race	%
White	92.5%
Black	1.2%
Pardo (Multiracial)	5.6%
Asian	0.7%

== Administrative definitions ==
Law municipal Number 18 of October 20, 1954, created the district Praia de Camboriú, subject to the city of Camboriú. This remained the case until at least 1958.

State law Number 960 of April 8, 1964, dismembered Camboriú and created Balneário de Camboriú as a higher category of municipality. A district headquarters was established on July 20, 1964, in the old district of Praia do Camboriú.

== Geography ==
=== Climate ===
The climate is considered mild and is the classification of Köppen Cfa type (mesothermic humid with hot summers). In summer, though hot, hardly ever reach the 40 °C, and its average is 25 °C. In winter, the average temperature is around 15 °C, but the minimum in the early morning can attain cooler values between 0 °C and 4 °C. The annual average is 19 °C. The climate is generally humid, with mean annual rainfall of 1,500 mm, with no defined dry season (the rainfall regime is typical of the humid subtropical type of climate). Possible floods and droughts hit the city, damaging its economy and population.

The temperature of sea water for this region of Balneário Camboriú ranges from 16 °C on average (in winter) to 24.4 °C on average (in summer), whereas in autumn and spring is around 21 °C The warmest months are: February and March are the two best months to enjoy the beach.

Climate data for Balneário Camboriú
Month	Jan	Feb	Mar	Apr	May	Jun	Jul	Aug	Sep	Oct	Nov	Dec	Year
Mean daily maximum °C (°F)	29.0 (84.2)	28.8 (83.8)	28.3 (82.9)	25.8 (78.4)	23.8 (74.8)	22.1 (71.8)	21.3 (70.3)	21.5 (70.7)	22.1 (71.8)	23.7 (74.7)	25.4 (77.7)	27.3 (81.1)	24.5 (76.1)
Daily mean °C (°F)	24.2 (75.6)	24.1 (75.4)	23.5 (74.3)	20.8 (69.4)	18.4 (65.1)	16.7 (62.1)	15.8 (60.4)	16.5 (61.7)	17.8 (64.0)	19.5 (67.1)	21.0 (69.8)	22.7 (72.9)	20.1 (68.2)
Mean daily minimum °C (°F)	19.8 (67.6)	19.6 (67.3)	18.7 (65.7)	15.8 (60.4)	13.1 (55.6)	11.3 (52.3)	10.4 (50.7)	11.6 (52.9)	13.6 (56.5)	15.3 (59.5)	16.6 (61.9)	18.2 (64.8)	15.8 (60.4)
Average rainfall mm (inches)	186 (7.3)	209 (8.2)	166 (6.5)	131 (5.2)	105 (4.1)	82 (3.2)	79 (3.1)	96 (3.8)	119 (4.7)	146 (5.7)	115 (4.5)	135 (5.3)	1,569 (61.8)
Source: World Meteorological Organization

== Economy ==
The main economic activity of the city is related to its residential real estate market, dominated by local developers, with prices reaching US$10,000/sqm for beachfront high rises, although the average price falls to around US$3,000/sqm. Loose urban laws allowed the creation of some of the tallest buildings in the southern hemisphere, surpassing 280m of height in some cases. The fluctuation of its population, which rises almost fivefold during the summer season, commonly overloads municipal service networks, degrading water quality for beachgoers and causing shortages in the fresh water supply. Recent investments have been made to tackle this issue, but the city’s high density and population fluctuation makes it a challenging task. The access to Balneario Camboriú is restricted to its main state road, BR-101, and the affluence of tourists causes large traffic jams in all directions for the most part of the year. The nearest airport is located in Navegantes, 16 km (9.9 mi) distant. A cruise terminal has been planned, due to be completed in 2025-26, in order to further supplement the availability of the city to tourists. Near the future terminal, in the southern end of the city, there is a cable car at the Tourist Complex UNIPRAIAS that connects the central beach to the nearby Laranjeiras beach. There are many other beaches in the southern section of Balneário Camboriú, such as Bamboos, Estaleiro, Estaleirinho, and Pinho beach (the first officially designated nudist beach in Brazil). These beaches are linked by Interpraias road, up to the limits of the municipality of Itapema. Other prevalent forms of economic activity within the city are in trade and the services industries. There are around 100 hotels, 350 large commercial buildings, and 1,035 high-density upper- and middle-class residential buildings.

Regarding tourists, 45% of intranational or domestic tourists come from the State of São Paulo; many of the rest come from nearby states, such as Paraná and Rio Grande do Sul, in addition to Santa Catarina itself. Regarding international visitors, 30% come from Argentina, and the rest, roughly speaking, from neighboring countries such as Uruguay, Paraguay and Chile.

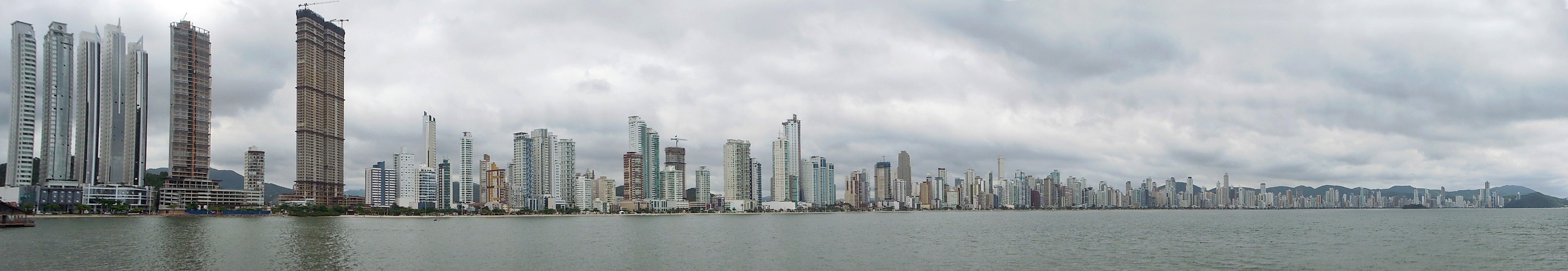
Panoramic view seen from the Molhe of the South Barra.

== Sights ==
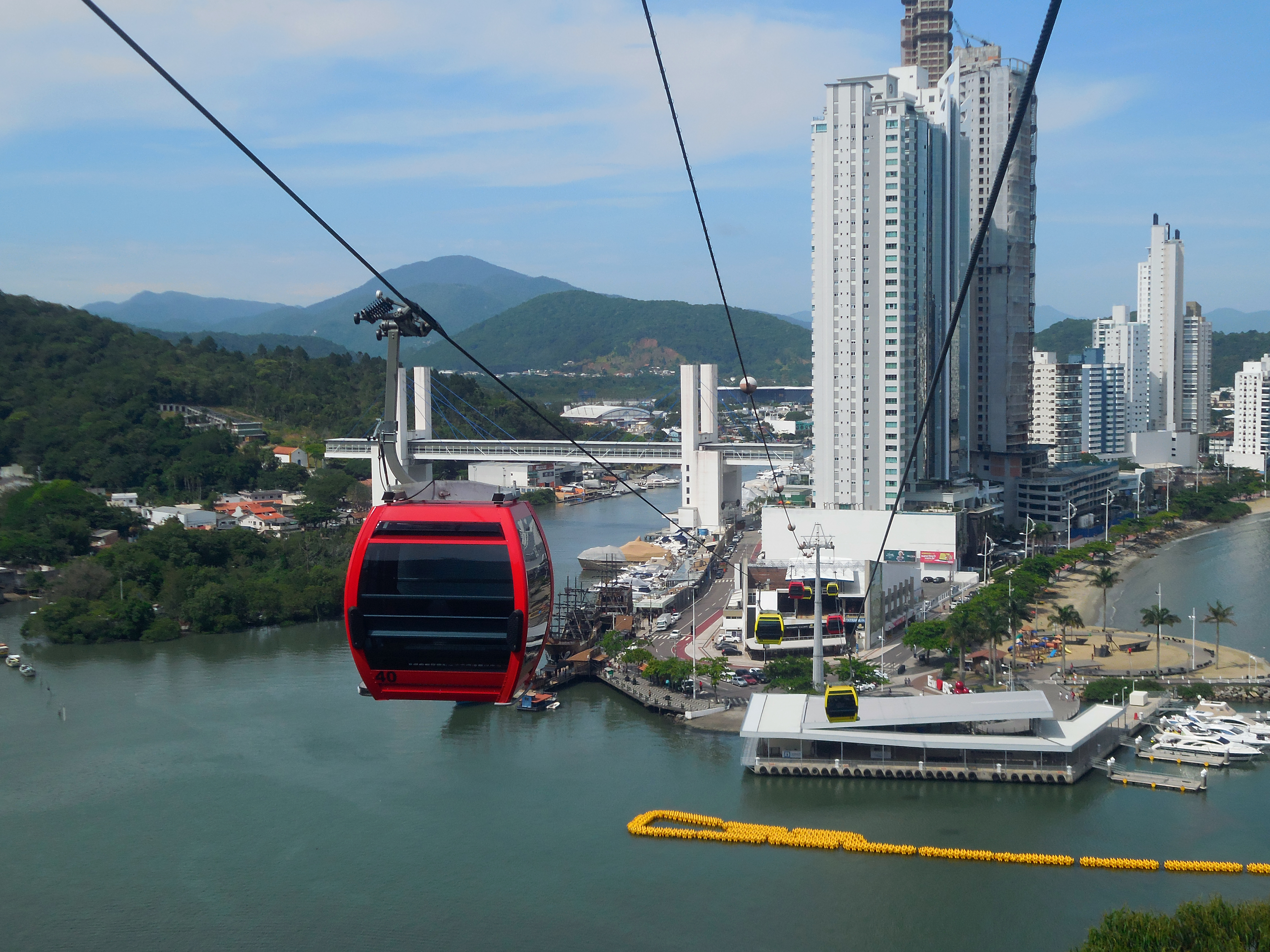
Cableway of the Unipraias park with the Barra Sul station in the background.

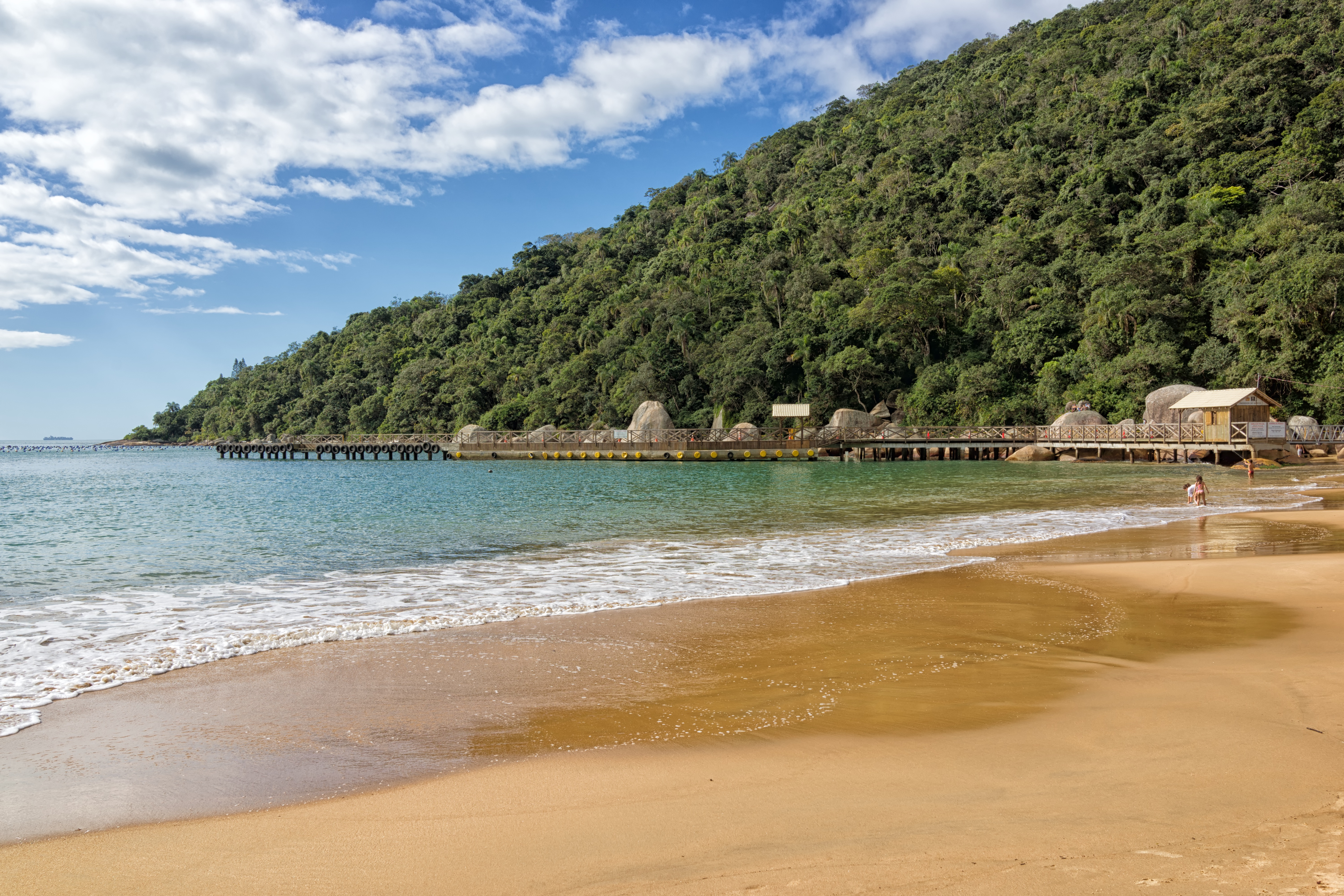
Praia das Laranjeiras beach.

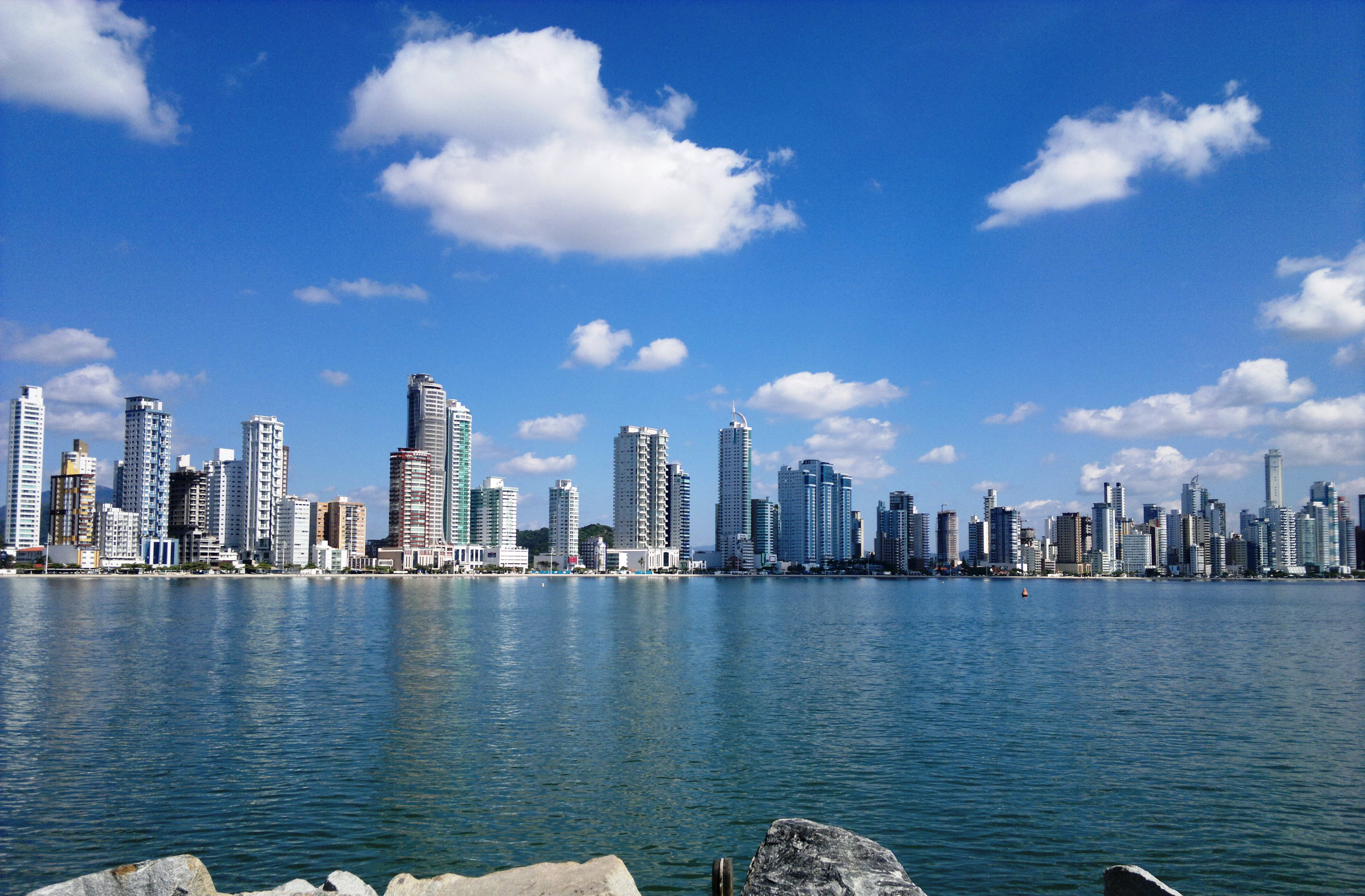
View of Balneário Camboriú.

- Parque Unipraias (Unipraias Park) – A park including Mata Atlântica (Atlântica Woods) which are almost extinct, and gives an opportunity to watch ocean views.
- Cristo Luz – A monument 33 meters tall (108 ft) atop Morro da Cruz. It is served by a tourist complex with restaurants, stores, live shows and playgrounds.
- Parque Cyro Gevaerd (also known as Santur) – It houses birds, an aquarium, an Archeologic and Oceanographic Museum, a Fishermen Museum and a Minifarm that show local species of both fauna and flora in its natural habitat. In the zoo, lions, tigers, monkeys, alligators and many other animals and some of the attractions.
- Capela de Santo Amaro (St. Amaro Chappel) – Built in 1810 with a mixture of whale oil and mortar, it was classified as a local Historical Patrimony in June 1998. It is located in Bairro da Barra neighborhood right in front of the Fishermen Plaza and the school of Arts.
- Parque Natural Municipal Raimundo Gonçalez Malta – Known previously as Parque Ecológico Rio Camboriú, it includes different types of local plants, with gardens such as Bromelia, Viveira da Mata Atlântica and São Francisco Garden. There are several echo trails, playgrounds and parking lots. It is located at the end of Angelina Street.

== Musical culture ==
Forbes magazine published a story in late February 2012 about the ascent of electronic music in Brazil. Balneário Camboriú was presented as the country's "capital of e-music". According to Forbes, Balneário Camboriú is the home to the two best clubs in Brazil, the Warung club (Itajaí) and the Green Valley club, which the publication claims to have make up to $1.6 million in income per night. Green Valley in particular was elected many times as the top nightclub in the world by the DJ Magazine, positioning the city among the top spots for the electronic music scene worldwide. In 2012, the famous nightclub Space opened an affiliate in the city, the Space B. Camboriú, but the project was not successful.

== Twin towns – sister cities ==
Balneário Camboriú is twinned with:

- Pingdingshan, Henan, China
- Punta del Este, Maldonado Department, Uruguay

== See also ==
- List of tallest buildings in Balneário Camboriú
