= List of tallest structures in Albania =

A partial list of the tallest architectural structures in Albania, containing all types of structures.

== Hydropower dams ==
No.	Name	Location	Height	Year
1	Skavica Dam	Drin River; 41.943333°N 20.365278°E	434 m (1,424 ft)	ongoing
2	Moglica Dam	Devoll River; 40.693144°N 20.440548°E	167 m (548 ft)	2020
3	Fierza Dam	Drin River; 42.251528°N 20.042906°E	166.5 m (546 ft)	1978
4	Koman Dam	Drin River; 42.106367°N 19.827078°E	115 m (377 ft)	1985
5	Banja Dam	Devoll River; 40.964668°N 20.066460°E	100 m (330 ft)	2016
6	Fangu Dam	Fan River; 41.799596°N 19.861084°E	92 m (302 ft)	2018
7	Ulza Dam	Mat River; 41.679863°N 19.893375°E	64 m (210 ft)	1958
8	Vau i Dejës Dams: Zadeja; Qyrsaqi; Rragami	Drin River; 42.014849°N 19.636571°E	↓ 60 m (200 ft); 46.4 m (152 ft); 34 m (112 ft)	1970, 1975
9	Shkopet Dam	Mat River; 41.691187°N 19.830419°E	47.7 m (156 ft)	1963

== Radio masts ==
No.	Name	Location	Height	Type	Year	Notes
1	Kukës transmitter, Large Mast	Kukës; 42.093856°N 20.415312°E	140 m (460 ft)	Guyed mast	—	
2	Cërrik South Shortwave Transmitter	Cërrik; 40.992208°N 19.993631°E	131 m (430 ft)	Lattice tower	—	multiple towers of different heights
3	Shijak transmitter, Large Mast	Shijak; 41.328564°N 19.555408°E	130 m (430 ft)	Guyed mast	—	
4	Cërrik North Shortwave Transmitter	Cërrik; 41.013894°N 19.989833°E	128 m (420 ft)	Lattice tower	—	multiple towers of different heights
5	Fllakë transmitter, ARRT-Antenna	Fllakë; 41.361178°N 19.508036°E	126 m (413 ft)	Guyed mast	—	
6	Shkodër Radio Mast	Shkodër; 42.047344°N 19.529039°E	123.44 m (405.0 ft)	Guyed mast	—	
7	Korçë Radio Mast	Korçë; 40.602675°N 20.775119°E	102.1 m (335 ft)	Guyed mast	—	

== Industrial chimneys ==
No.	Name	Location	Height	Type	Year	Status
1	Large Chimney of Elbasan Metallurgical Combinate	Elbasan; 41.089013°N 20.031911°E	128 m (420 ft)	Chimney	—	—
2	Kiln of Borizanë Cement Factory	Borizanë; 41.548178°N 19.724375°E	127 m (417 ft)	Kiln	—	—
3	Kiln of Sinoma Cement Factory	Zall; 41.501981°N 19.744400°E	122 m (400 ft)	Kiln	—	—
4	Large chimney of Ish Uzina e Superfosfatit	Laç; 41.652901°N 19.707865°E	116 m (381 ft)	Chimney	—	—
5	Azotiku Chemical Chimney	Fier; 40.701171°N 19.551607°E	100 m (330 ft)	Chimney	1967	Decommissioned

== See also ==
- List of tallest buildings in Albania
- List of tallest structures in Kosovo
- List of tallest structures in Europe
