= Towers Karpoš IV Tower II =

Towers Karpoš IV Tower I
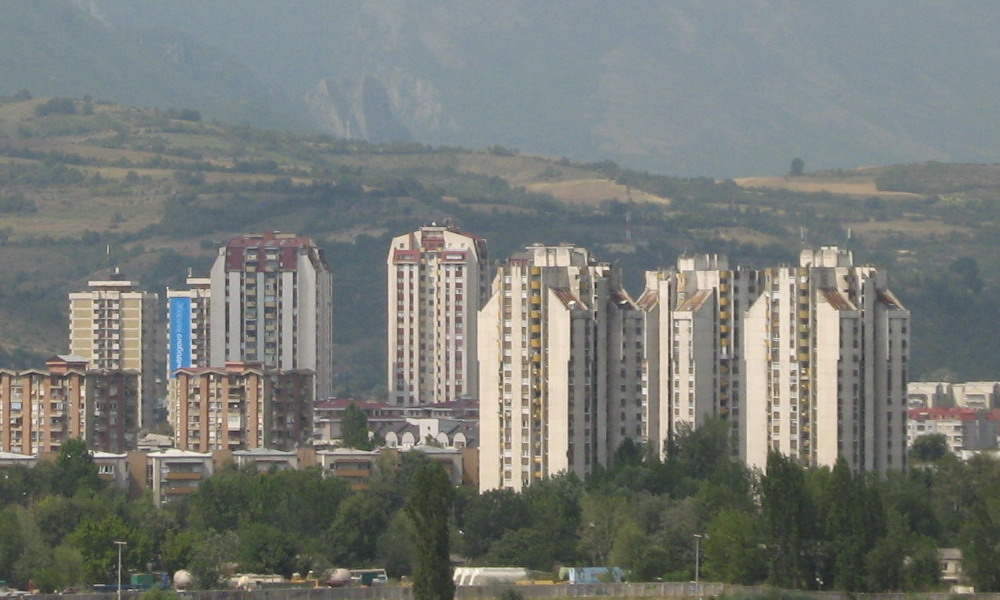
- Tower II in Karpoš IV, along with Tower I and III

General information
- Type: Residential
- Location: Skopje, North Macedonia
- Completed: 1978

Technical details
- Floor count: 19

Towers Karpoš IV Tower II is a building, tied for second tallest building in North Macedonia. It is located in the Karpoš municipality of Skopje. Towers Karpoš IV Tower II stands at 19 stories.

== See also ==
- Towers Karpoš IV Tower I
- Towers Karpoš IV Tower III
- List of tallest buildings in North Macedonia
