= Towers Karpoš IV Tower I =

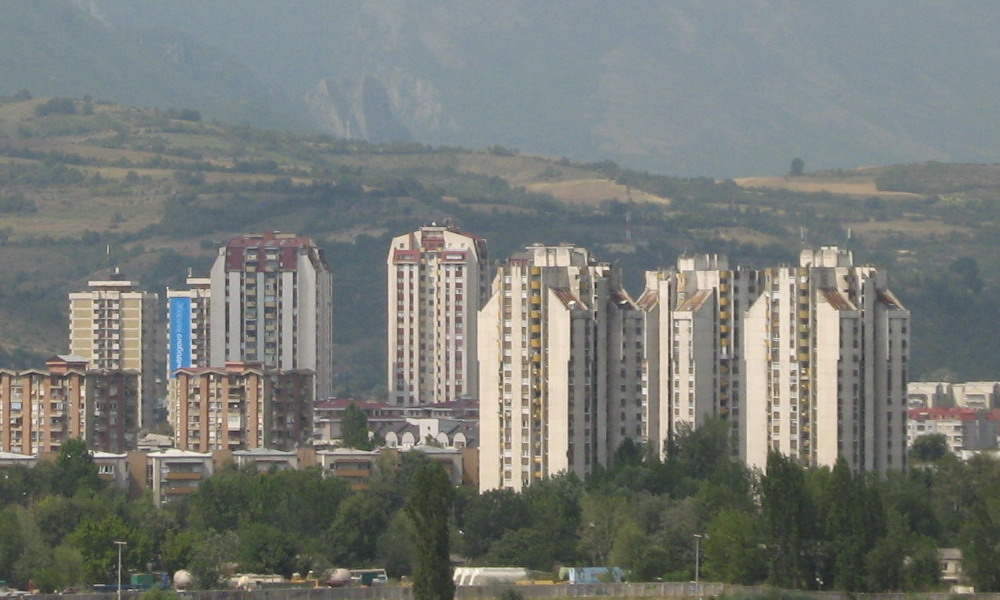
- Tower I in Karpoš IV, along with Tower II and III

General information
- Type: Residential
- Location: Skopje, North Macedonia
- Completed: 1978

Technical details
- Floor count: 19

Towers Karpoš IV Tower I is a building, tied for second tallest building in North Macedonia. It is located in the Karpoš municipality of Skopje. Towers Karpoš IV Tower I stands at 19 storeys.

== See also ==
- Towers Karpoš IV Tower II
- Towers Karpoš IV Tower III
- List of tallest buildings in North Macedonia
