= Dolno Nerezi =

Dolno Nerezi Долно Нерези Nerez i Poshtëm
- Neighbourhood
- Location within Republic of Macedonia
- Coordinates: 41°59′N 21°22′E
- Country: North Macedonia
- Region: Skopje
- Municipality: Karpoš

Population (2002)
  - Total: 12,418
- Time zone: UTC+1 (CET)
  - Summer (DST): UTC+2 (CEST)
- Car plates: SK
- Website: .

Dolno Nerezi (Macedonian: Долно Нерези, Albanian: Nerez i Poshtëm) is a neighbourhood in the City of Skopje, North Macedonia, administered by the Karpoš Municipality.

== Demographics ==
In statistics gathered by Vasil Kanchov in 1900, the village was inhabited by 300 Muslim Albanians and 260 Christian Bulgarians.

According to the 2002 census, the town had a total of 12,418 inhabitants. Ethnic groups in the town include:

- Macedonians 10,288
- Albanians 1,353
- Serbs 378
- Turks 93
- Vlachs 58
- Romani 19
- Bosniaks 14
- Others 217
