= List of tallest buildings in Bosnia and Herzegovina =

This list of tallest buildings in Bosnia and Herzegovina ranks skyscrapers and high-rise buildings in Bosnia and Herzegovina that stand at least 200 ft (61 m) tall.

The tallest building in the country is currently the Avaz Twist Tower in Sarajevo, which stands at 172 m (564 ft) tall and was completed in 2008. Among the notable skyscrapers in Sarajevo are the UNITIC Towers, which were originally completed in 1986 and subsequently renovated following the Bosnian War in 1999.

The tallest structure in Bosnia and Herzegovina is the chimney at the Ugljevik Power Plant in Ugljevik, standing at 310 m (1,017 ft), but it is excluded from this list because it is not a habitable building.

== Tallest buildings ==
The following list ranks existing buildings standing at least 200 ft (61 m) in Bosnia and Herzegovina by height.

Was the tallest building in Bosnia and Herzegovina upon completion

Rank	Name	City	Image	Height m (ft)	Floors	Year	Notes	References
1	Avaz Twist Tower	Sarajevo		172 m (564 ft)	39	2008	Tallest building in Bosnia and Herzegovina since 2008. Tallest building in former Yugoslavia. Tallest building in the Balkans outside of Turkey until 2023.	
2=	Bosmal City Center Tower 1	Sarajevo		118 m (387 ft)	27	2006	Also known as Bosmal Arjaan by Rotana. Tallest residential building in Bosnia and Herzegovina, along with Bosmal City Center Tower 2. Tallest building in Bosnia and Herzegovina from 2006 to 2008.	
2=	Bosmal City Center Tower 2	Sarajevo		118 m (387 ft)	27	2006		
4=	UNITIC Towers A	Sarajevo		111 m (364 ft)	25	1986	Tallest building in Bosnia and Herzegovina from 1986 to 2006, along with UNITIC Towers B. Renovated in 1999.	
4=	UNITIC Towers B	Sarajevo		111 m (364 ft)	25	1986	Tallest building in Bosnia and Herzegovina from 1986 to 2006, along with UNITIC Towers A. Renovated in 1999.	
6	Mellain Center	Tuzla		110 m (361 ft)	24	2015	Tallest building in Bosnia and Herzegovina outside of Sarajevo.	
7	Lamela	Zenica		102 m (335 ft)	27	1976	Tallest building in Zenica. Tallest building in Bosnia and Herzegovina from 1976 to 1986.	
8	Tuzla Tower	Tuzla		97 m (318 ft)	26	2024		
9	Mostarka	Mostar		95 m (312 ft)	22	N/D	Tallest building in Mostar.	
10=	Greece–Bosnia and Herzegovina Friendship Building	Sarajevo		83 m (272 ft)	21	1974	Formerly known as Executive Council Building. Tallest building in Bosnia and Herzegovina from 1974 to 1976. Shelled by Serb forces in 1992 during the Siege of Sarajevo. Reconstructed in 2007.	
10=	Sarajevo Tower 83	Sarajevo		83 m (272 ft)	26	2020		
12	Blok S2 Novo Sarajevo	Sarajevo		82 m (269 ft)	19	2015		
13	Sarajevo City Center	Sarajevo		74 m (243 ft)	20	2014		
14	Republika Srpska Government Tower	Banja Luka		70 m (230 ft)	17	2007	Tallest building in Banja Luka.	
15=	Capital Tower	Sarajevo		66 m (217 ft)	16	2010		
15=	Novotel Sarajevo Bristol	Sarajevo		66 m (217 ft)	16	1973	Tallest building in Bosnia and Herzegovina from 1973 to 1974. Reconstructed in 2011.	
15=	Integral Building	Banja Luka		66 m (217 ft)	14	2010		

== Tallest under construction, approved, or proposed ==
This list contains the tallest buildings in Bosnia and Herzegovina that are under construction, approved, or proposed.

=== Under construction ===
Rank	Name	City	Height m (ft)	Floors	Notes
1	Palas Hotel	Banja Luka	100 m (328 ft)	33	Set to become the tallest building in Banja Luka upon completion. Construction is scheduled to be completed in 2030.

=== Approved ===
Rank	Name	City	Height m (ft)	Floors	Notes
1	Avaz R Tower	Sarajevo	181 m (594 ft)	40	Formerly known as Avaz Ski Tower. If built, it will surpass the Avaz Twist Tower as the tallest building in Bosnia and Herzegovina. The project was approved in January 2020, but as of 2026, no groundbreaking date has been announced.

== See also ==
- List of tallest buildings in Croatia
- List of tallest buildings in Kosovo
- List of tallest buildings in North Macedonia
- List of tallest buildings in Serbia
- List of tallest buildings in Slovenia
- List of tallest buildings in Europe
