= List of tallest buildings in North Macedonia =

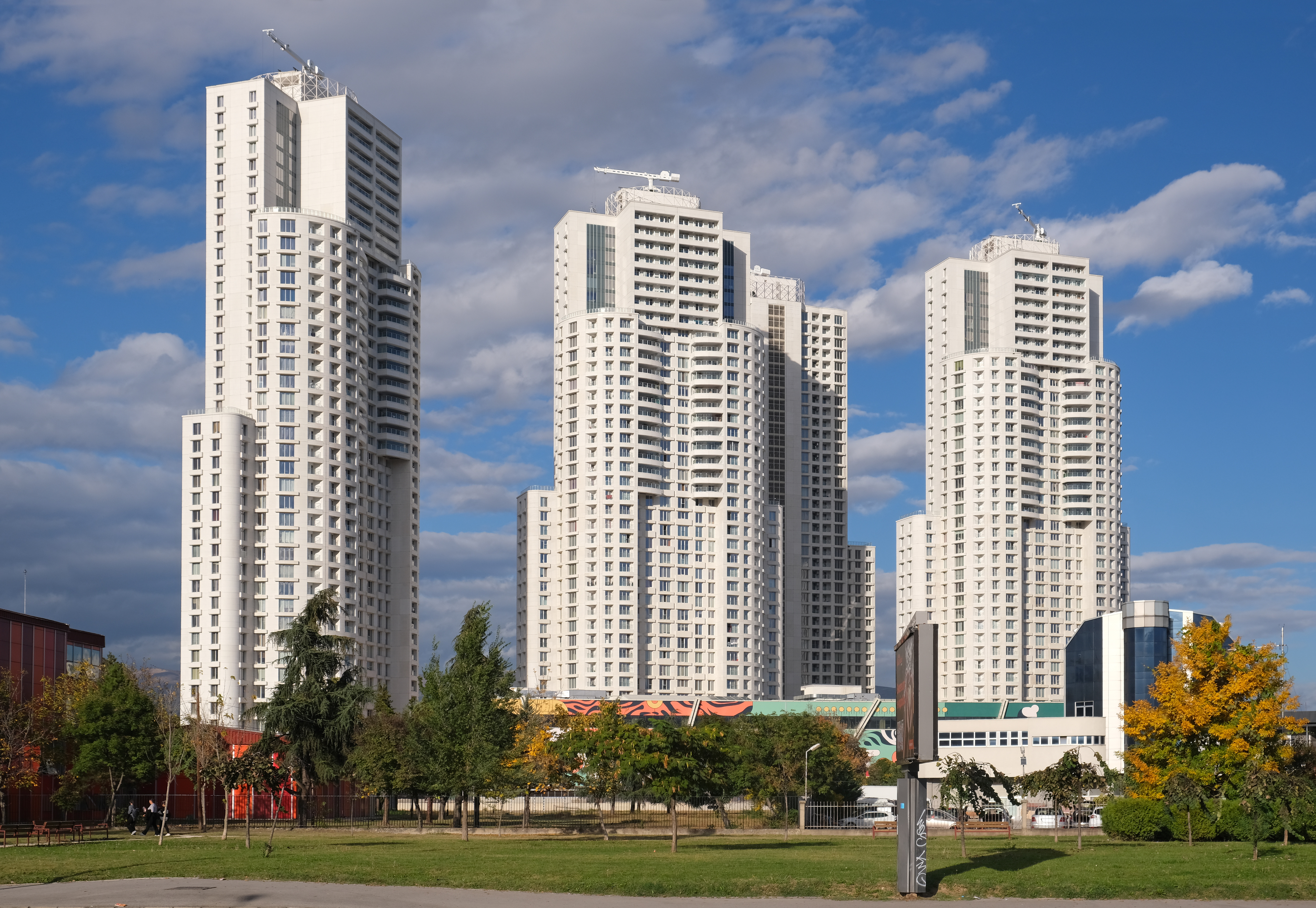
Cevahir Towers contains the four tallest buildings in North Macedonia

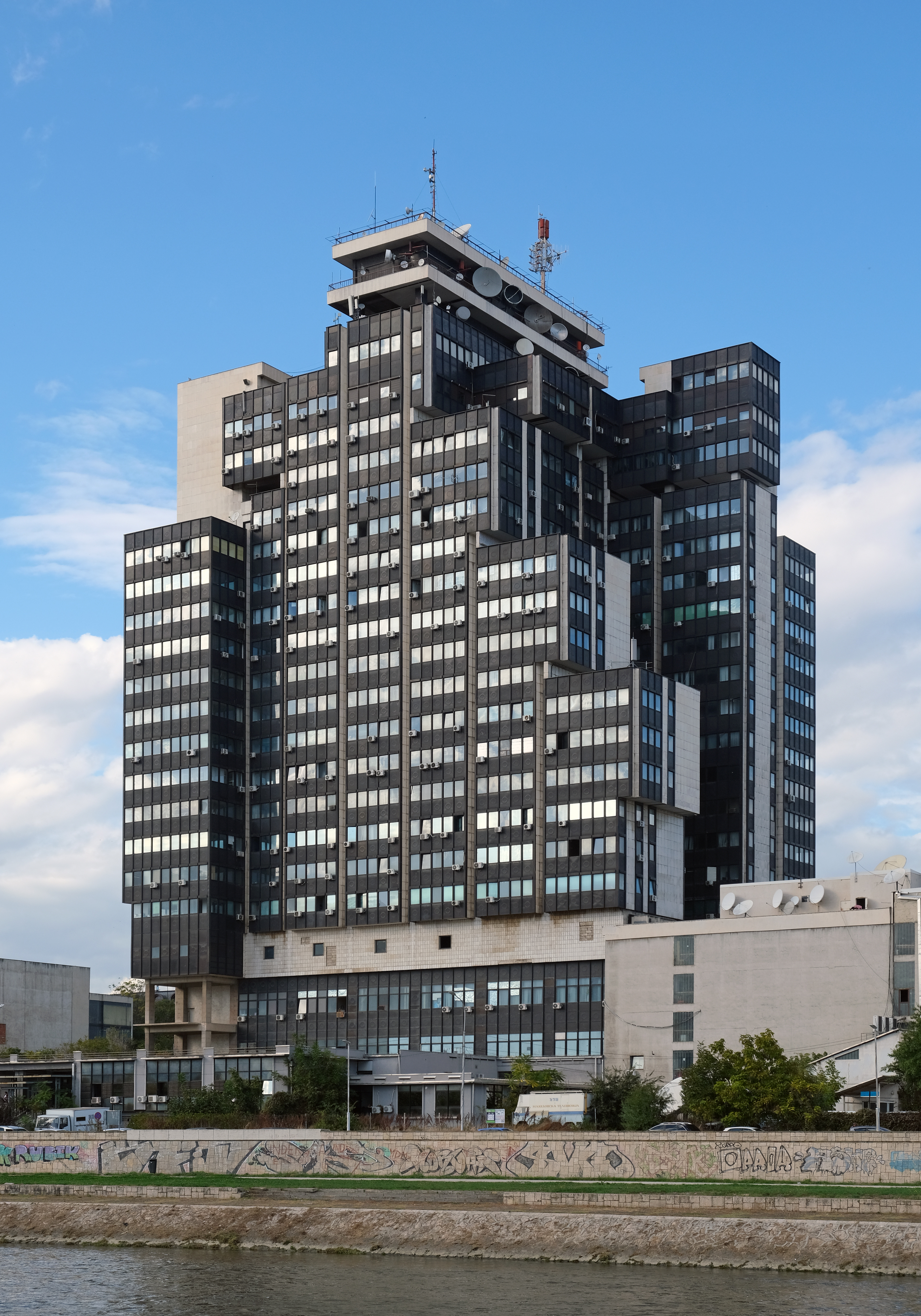
The MRT Center, the former tallest building

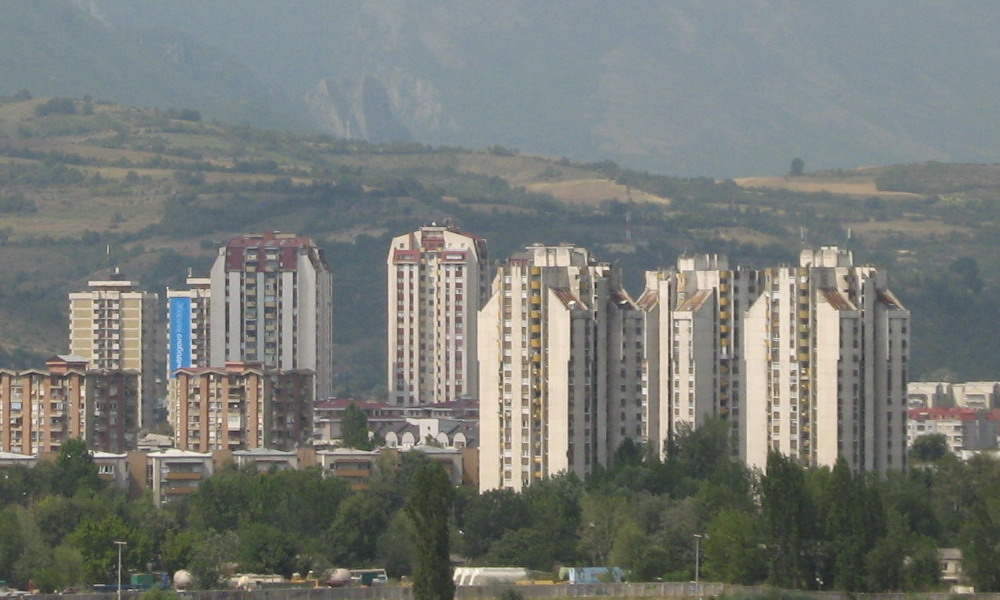
Towers Karpos IV in Karpoš IV, Skopje

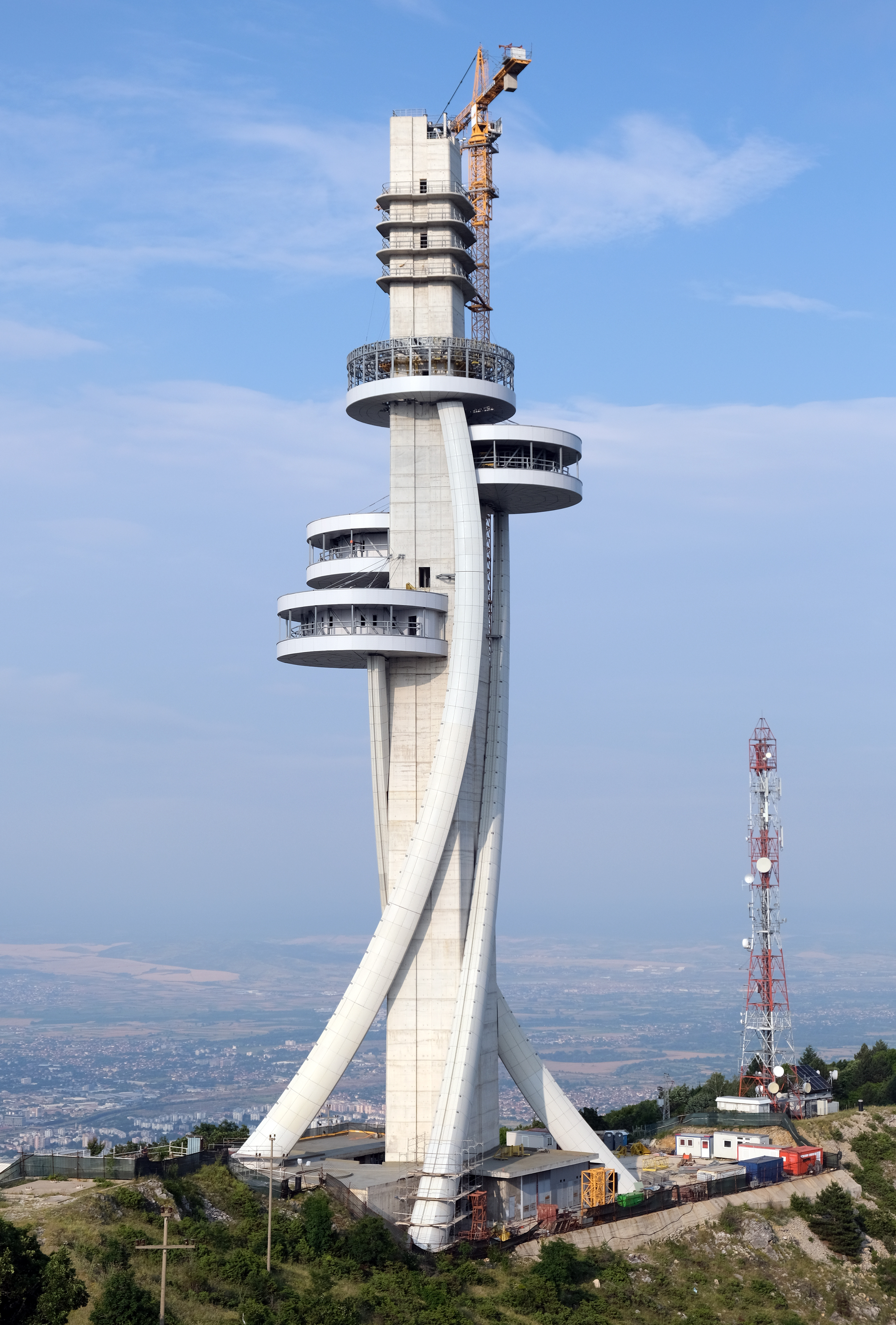
Vodno Telecommunication Tower under construction in 2023

This list of tallest buildings in North Macedonia ranks buildings in North Macedonia by official height. Currently, the tallest buildings in North Macedonia are the Cevahir Towers, four buildings each rising 427 feet (130 metres).

== Tallest buildings in North Macedonia ==
was the tallest building in the North Macedonia upon completion

This list ranks North Macedonia's tallest buildings.

Rank	Name	Location	Height feet / meters	Floors	Year	Notes
N/A	Vodno Telecommunication Tower	Skopje	509 / 155	N/A	2023	
1	Cevahir Tower A	Skopje	465 / 142	42	2015	
1	Cevahir Tower B	Skopje	465 / 142	42	2015	
1	Cevahir Tower C	Skopje	465 / 142	42	2015	
1	Cevahir Tower D	Skopje	465 / 142	42	2015	
5	MRT Center	Skopje	260 / 80	26	1984	Tallest building in Macedonia prior to 2013
N/A	Millennium Cross	Skopje	217 / 66	N/A	2002	
6=	Flatiron Skopje	Skopje	197 / 60	20	2016	
6=	City Tower	Skopje		20	2014	
6=	Aerodrom Tower	Skopje		20	1975	
9	Towers Karpoš IV Tower I	Skopje		19	1982	
9	Towers Karpoš IV Tower II	Skopje		19		
9	Towers Karpoš IV Tower III	Skopje		19		
12	Suma Kumanovo	Kumanovo		18		
13	Tri ubavici Kula I	Skopje	162 / 50	17	1978	
13	Tri ubavici Kula 2	Skopje	162 / 50	17	1978	
13	Tri ubavici Kula 3	Skopje	162 / 50	17	1978	
16=	Nova Makedonija press house	Skopje		15		15 floors
16=	Aleksandar Makedonski Hotel	Skopje		15+2	1979	High (ground)floor + mezzanine + 15 floors
17	Gradski Dzid	Skopje		14	1971	
18	Hotel Continental	Skopje		13		
19	Ubavici	Bitola		13		
20	Soravia Center	Skopje		12		
21	12 katnica	Kavadarci		14		
22	Holiday Inn Skopje	Skopje		15		

== Clock towers ==
Rank	Name	Location	Height feet / meters	Year	Notes
1	Prilep Clock Tower	Prilep	180 / 55	1825/26	
2	Skopje Clock Tower	Skopje	121 / 37	1572	
3	Bitola Clock Tower	Bitola	105 / 32	1830	
4	Gostivar Clock Tower	Gostivar	67 / 20.5	1728/29	
5	Ohrid Clock Tower	Ohrid	39 / 12	1726	
6	Štip Clock Tower	Štip	36 / 11	1650	

== See also ==
- List of tallest buildings in the Balkans
