= MRT Center =

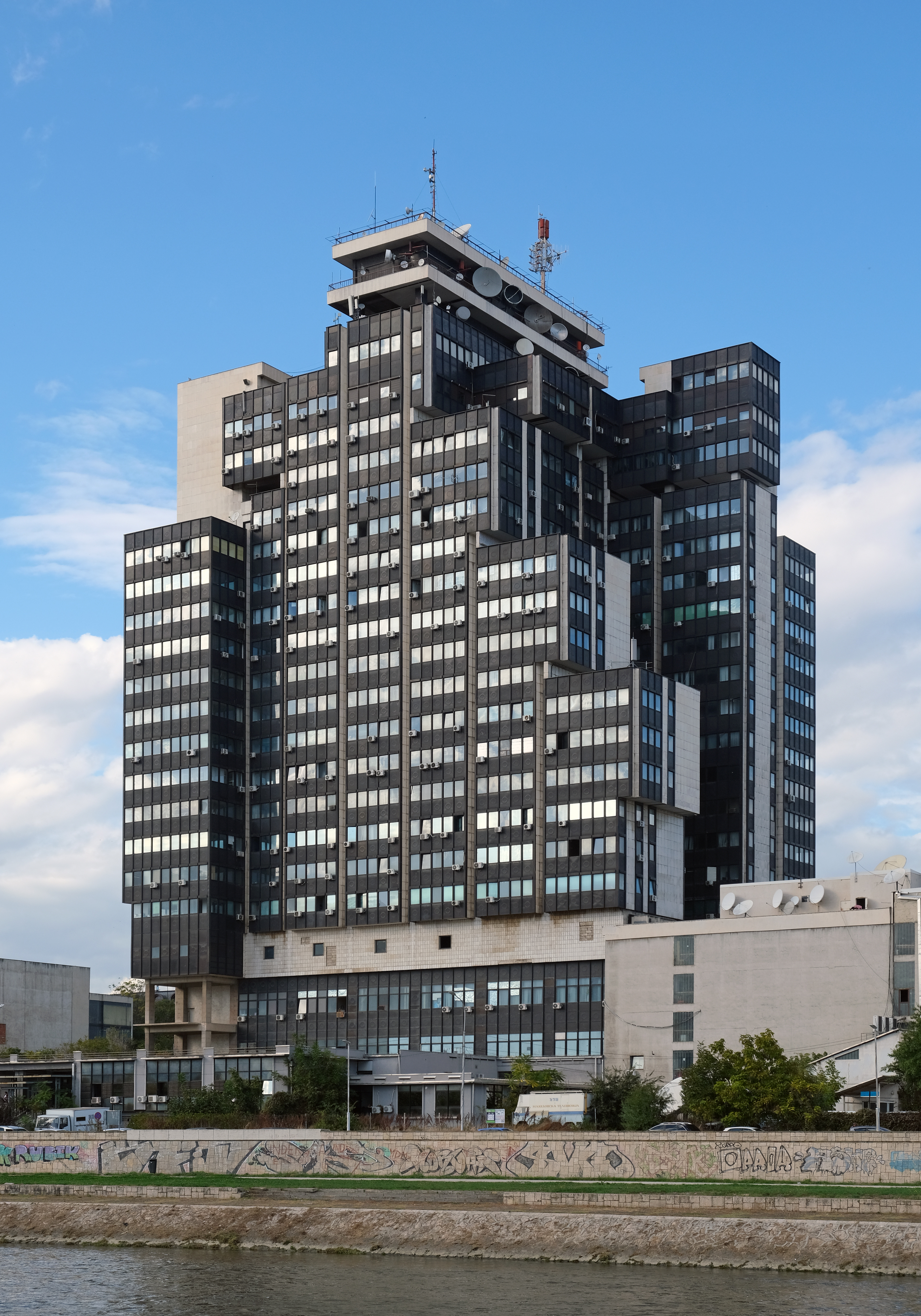

General information
- Type: radio station & television studio
- Location: Goce Delčev Boulevard; Skopje, North Macedonia
- Coordinates: 41.9972°N 21.4447°E
- Completed: 1984

Height
- Roof: 70 m (230 ft)

Technical details
- Floor count: 25

MRT Center is a modern-era high rise building in Skopje, North Macedonia. At 70 m (230 ft) high, it was the tallest building in the country from its completion until the taller 130 m (427 ft) Sky City Sky Scrapers project was built in 2015. Constructed in 1984, the MRT Center is completely owned by Macedonian Radio Television, as its headquarters.

== See also ==
- List of tallest buildings in North Macedonia
