= List of tallest structures in Republika Srpska =

This list of tallest structures in Republika Srpska ranks the tallest completed structures (buildings and towers) by height in Republika Srpska, an entity of Bosnia and Herzegovina.

The tallest structure in Republika Srpska is the 310-metre chimney of the Ugljevik Power Plant. This is also the tallest structure in Bosnia and Herzegovina.

== List ==
Rank	Image	Name	Location	Height meters
1		Chimney of Ugljevik Power Plant	Ugljevik	310 m
2		Chimney of Gacko Power Station	Gacko	160 m
3		Incel Chimney	Banja Luka	150 m
4		Republika Srpska Government Tower	Banja Luka	70 m
5		Integral Building	Banja Luka	66 m
6		Čajavčev neboder	Banja Luka	

== List of tallest structures under construction. ==
Rank	Name	Location	Height meters
1	Grand Trade Centar	Banja Luka	

== See also ==
- List of tallest buildings in Bosnia and Herzegovina
- List of tallest structures in Serbia
