= Vlae =

Vlae Влае
- Neighbourhood
- Location within Republic of Macedonia
- Coordinates: 42°00′28″N 21°22′32″E
- Country: North Macedonia
- Region: Skopje
- Municipality: Karpoš

Population (2002)
  - Total: 6,809
- Time zone: UTC+1 (CET)
  - Summer (DST): UTC+2 (CEST)
- Car plates: SK
- Website: .

Vlae (Macedonian: Влае) is a neighbourhood in the City of Skopje, North Macedonia, administered by the Karpoš Municipality.

== Demographics ==
According to the 2002 census, the village had a total of 6809 inhabitants. Ethnic groups in the village include:

- Macedonians 6340
- Serbs 249
- Albanians 47
- Vlachs 40
- Turks 11
- Bosniaks 7
- Romani 6
- Others 109
