= Skyline AFI Tower Belgrade =

Skyscraper in Belgrade

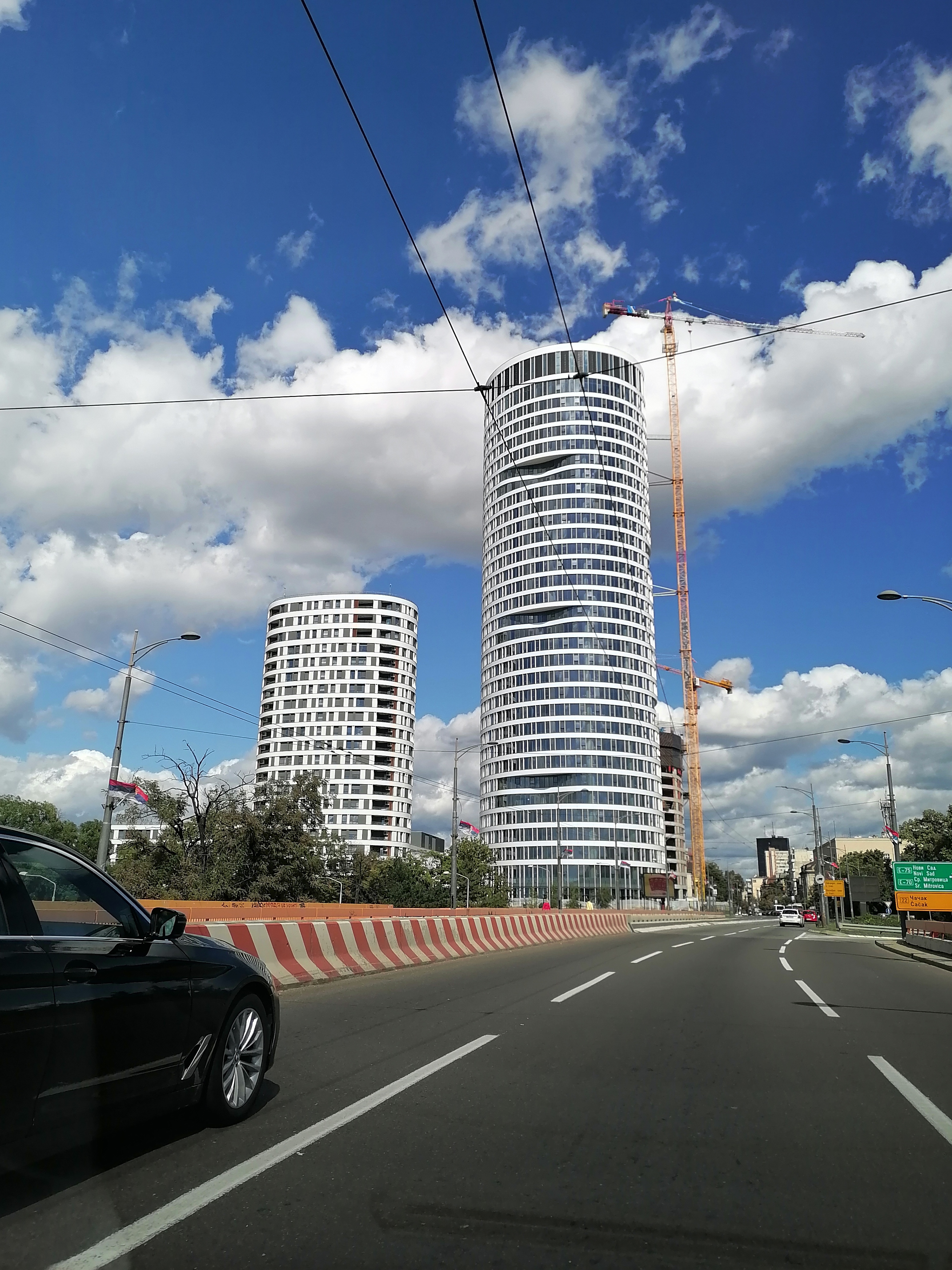

General information
- Status: Completed
- Type: Mixed-use, Residential
- Location: Belgrade, Serbia, Kneza Miloša Street, 90a, Belgrade
- Coordinates: 44.79999°N 20.45214°E
- Completed: 2022
- Cost: €73,000,000

Height
- Roof: 132 m (433 ft)

Technical details
- Structural system: Reinforced concrete
- Floor count: 31
- Floor area: 40,000 m^{2} (431,000 sq ft)
- Lifts/elevators: 11

Design and construction
- Architect: Ami Moore

Website
- Official website

Skyline AFI Tower is a mixed-use skyscraper located in Belgrade, Serbia. Completed in 2022, the building stands at 132 metres (433 ft) tall, being divided into 31 floors and is the fifth tallest building in the country. The tower is located within the Skyline Belgrade residential and business complex situated in the immediate proximity of the Kneza Miloša Street and inaugurated in April 2024. This site hosted the former building of the Federal Ministry of Internal Affairs, which was partially demolished during the 1999 NATO bombing of Yugoslavia.

== History ==
The AFI Tower is the tallest building of the Skyline Belgrade complex, which also consists of two shorter towers, one with 17 and one with 22 stories. Designed by archirect Ami Moore, the entire complex was built for a total cost of €200,000,000.

After completion of construction, the Skyline Tower became the third tallest building in Serbia, counting the height without antennas. Counting the antennas, i.e. the Ušće 1 building and the Western Gate of Belgrade, the Skyline is the fifth tallest building in Serbia.

The building has eleven high-speed elevators for employees and visitors, and will also have rental space on each floor. Within this business tower, there is also an underground garage with 473 parking spaces. The project investor is the Israeli company AFI Europe Serbia. The tower has a total usable area of 40,000 m2.

Construction began in November 2020. As of January 2022, the structure itself is almost complete, and the installation of the glass facade is well underway. Complete construction is scheduled for completion by the end of 2022. All three buildings are scheduled for completion in April 2024.

== See also ==
- List of tallest structures in Serbia
