= Rilindja Tower =

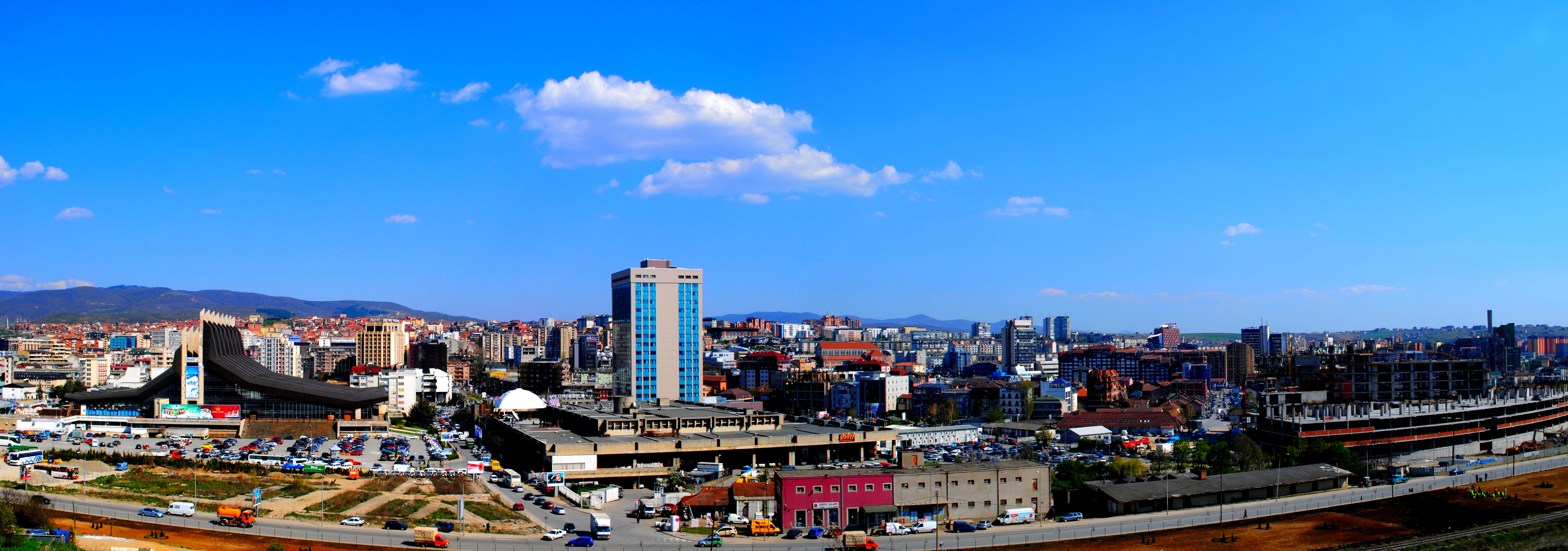
- Rilindja Tower in the Distance
- Interactive map of the Rilindja Tower area

General information
- Type: Government Offices
- Location: Pristina, Kosovo
- Coordinates: 42°39′35″N 21°9′18″E
- Construction started: 1978
- Completed: 1980

Technical details
- Floor count: 19

Design and construction
- Architect: Georgi Konstantinovski

Rilindja Tower is a government office building for the Government of Kosovo. At 89 meters high it hold 19 floors.

The building offers government offices for 4 ministries in Kosovo. The building was created when Kosovo was under Yugoslavia's government. Its close to many points of interest in Pristina. Such as the Palace of Youth and Sports and Fadil Vokrri Stadium. The architect Bhgjet Pacolli and his construction group mabetex reconstructed the tower.

== See also ==
- List of tallest buildings in Kosovo
