= Avaz Twist Tower =

Skyscraper in Sarajevo, Bosnia and Herzegovina

- Avaz Twist Tower in September 2014
- Interactive map of the Avaz Twist Tower area

General information
- Status: Completed
- Type: Office
- Location: Sarajevo, Bosnia and Herzegovina
- Coordinates: 43°51′38.7″N 18°24′07.6″E
- Construction started: 2006
- Completed: 2008
- Owner: Avaz-Roto Press

Height
- Architectural: 172 m (564 ft)
- Antenna spire: 172 m (564 ft)
- Roof: 142 m (466 ft)

Technical details
- Floor count: 39 (+ 1 below ground)
- Lifts/elevators: 7

Design and construction
- Architect: Faruk Kapidžić

Website
- https://avaztwisttower.ba/

The Avaz Twist Tower is a 40-story, 172 m (564 ft) tall skyscraper in Sarajevo, Bosnia and Herzegovina, and serves as the headquarters for the Bosnian newspaper company Dnevni avaz. Located in the Marijin Dvor neighborhood within Sarajevo's central municipality, construction on the skyscraper began in 2006 and was finished in 2008.

The building is notable for its distinctive twisted facade. As of 2026, it stands as the tallest building in Bosnia and Herzegovina. In 2009, the German toy manufacturing company Schuco selected the skyscraper as one of the 10 most beautiful buildings in the world. Upon its completion, it was the tallest building in the Balkans outside of Turkey for 15 years, until 2023 when the Sky Fort in Sofia, Bulgaria, was fully topped out. It remains the tallest building in the former Yugoslavia.

The skyscraper also houses BOHO Steak House, a steak restaurant on the 31st floor, and Sky Lounge 35, a café on the 35th floor, alongside an observation deck located on the 36th floor.

== Gallery ==
Avaz Twist Tower in June 2010

Avaz Twist Tower in October 2009

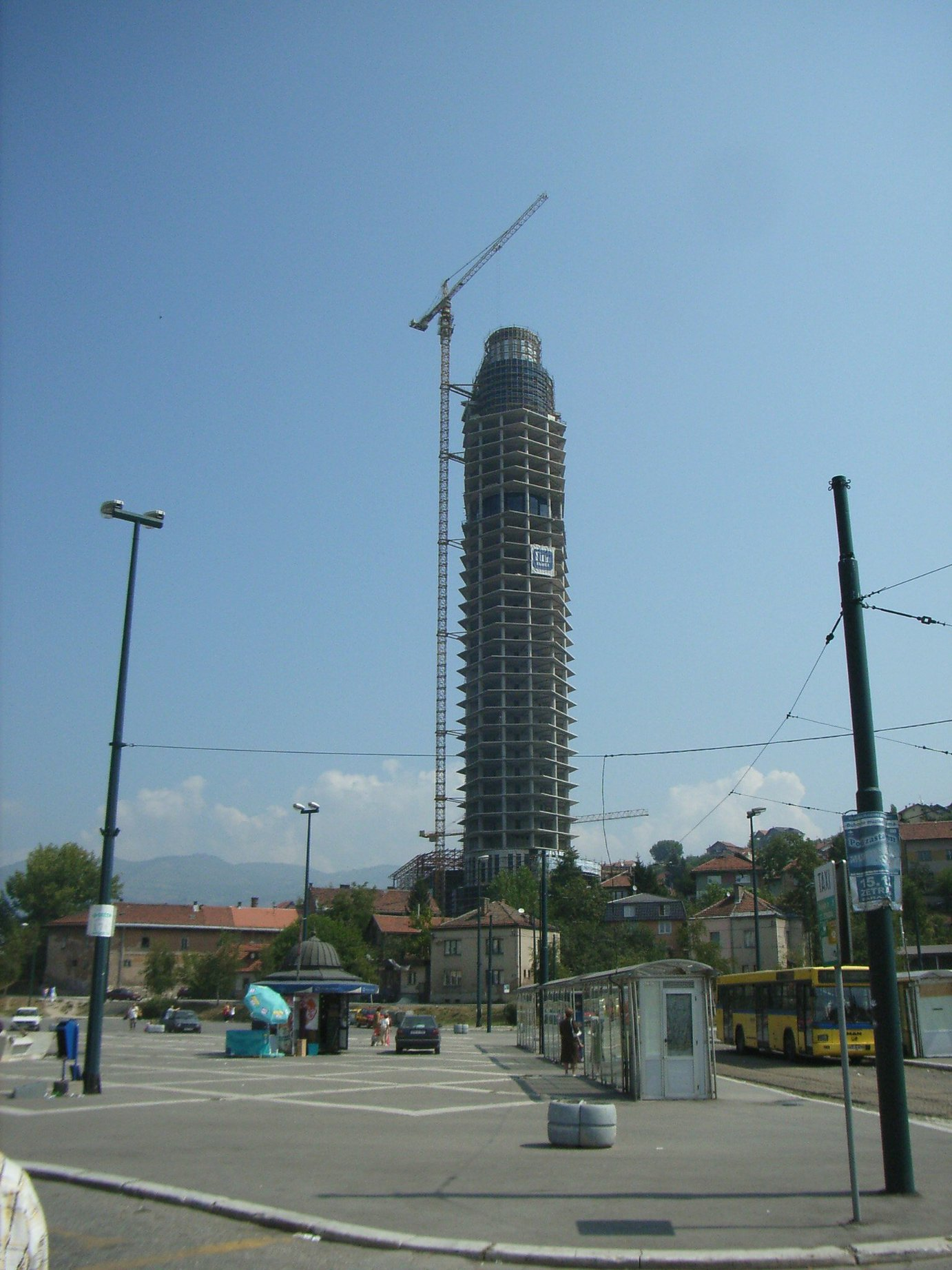
Avaz Twist Tower under construction in August 2007

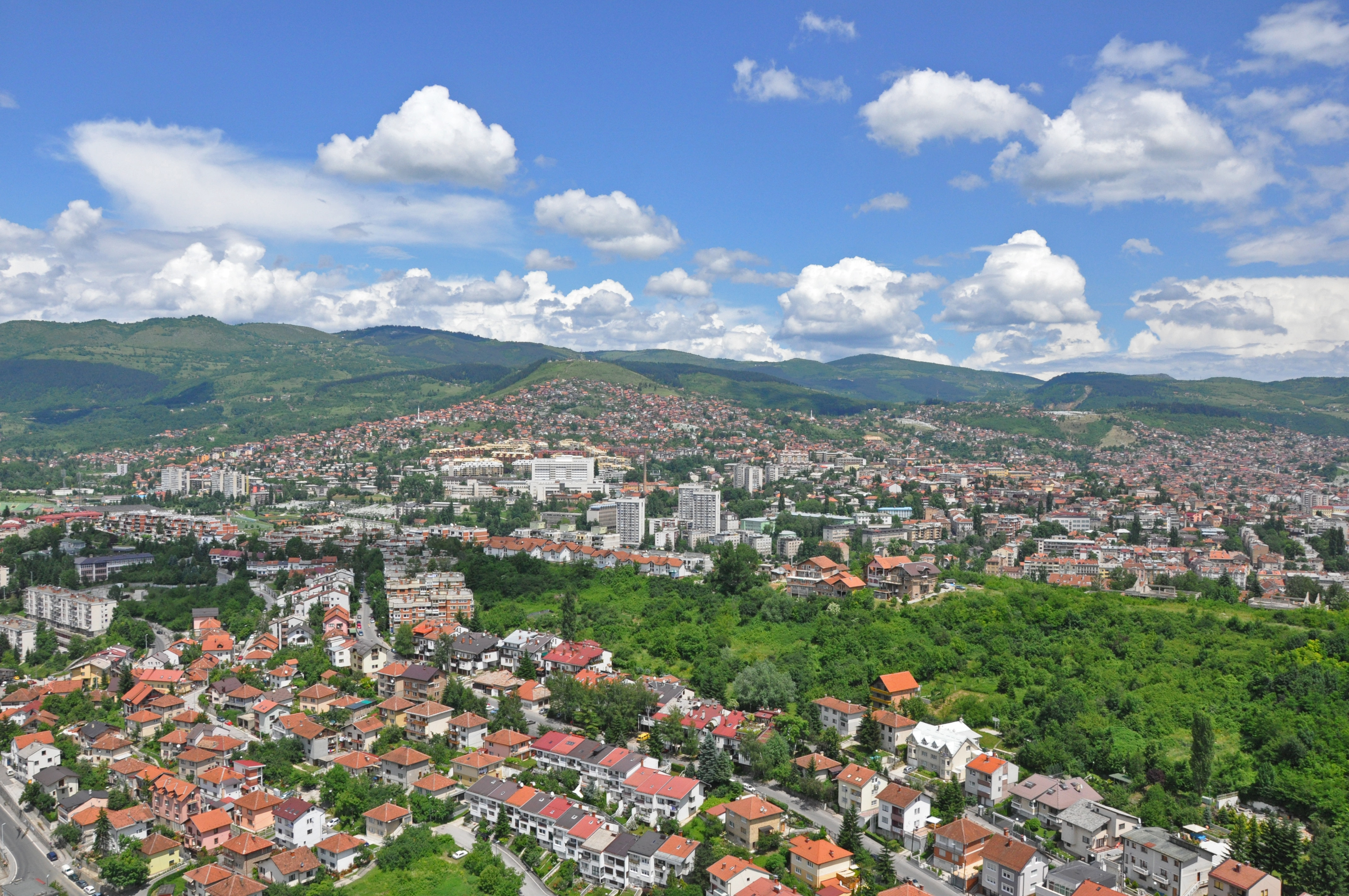
View from the skyscraper

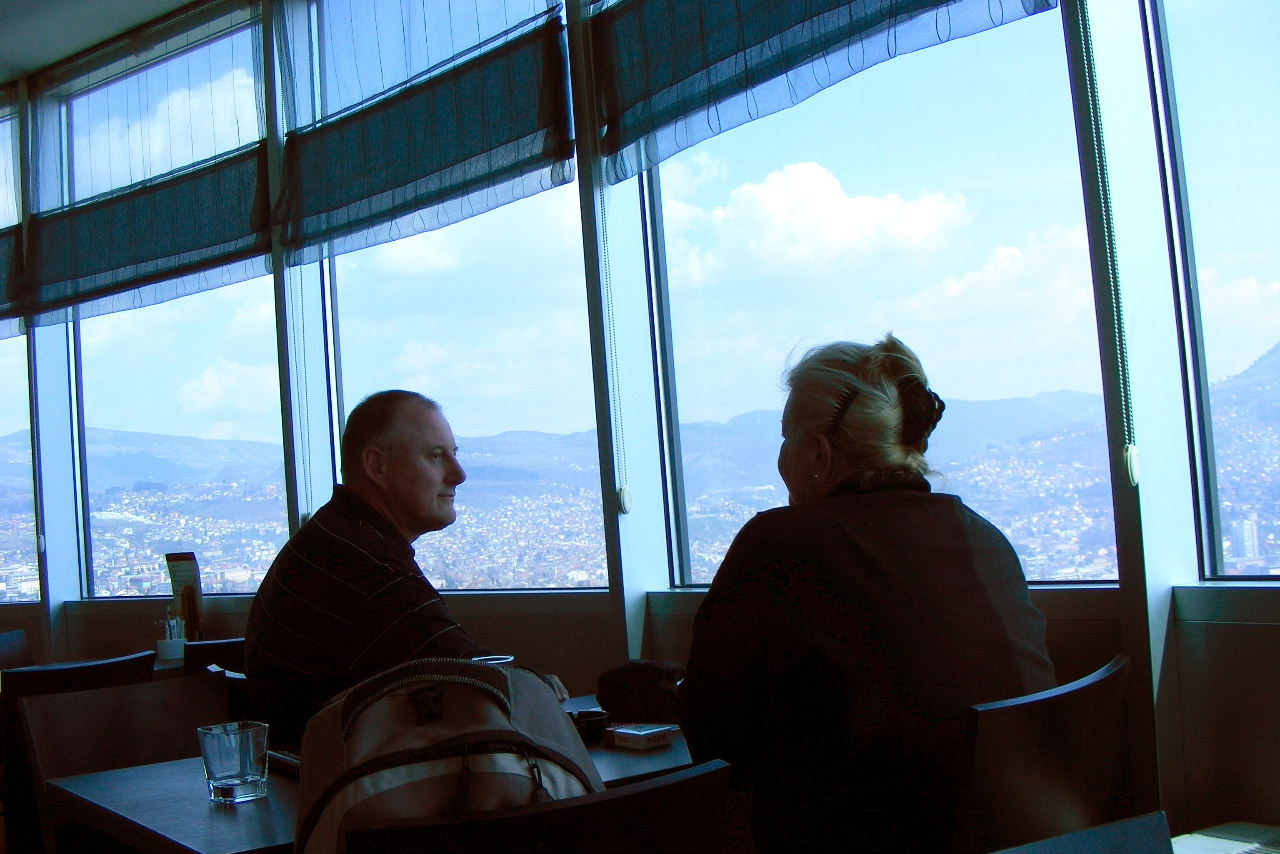
The Lounge 35

== See also ==
- List of tallest buildings in Bosnia and Herzegovina
- List of twisted buildings
- List of tallest buildings by city
- List of tallest buildings by country
