= List of tallest structures in Kosovo =

== Tallest structures in Kosovo ==
Picture	Structure	Year of construction	Structural type	Country	Town	Pinnacle height	Coordinates	Remarks
	Chimney of Trepča Lead Smelter	1972	Chimney	Kosovo	Zvečan	306 m	42°54′41.31″N 20°50′57.15″E	
	Chimney of Kosovo B Power Station	1980	Chimney	Kosovo	Obiliq	183 m	42°41′35.49″N 21°03′21.87″E	
	Chimney A5 of Kosovo A Power Station	1962	Chimney	Kosovo	Obiliq	150 m	42°40′32.53″N 21°04′59.33″E	
	Chimney A4 of Kosovo A Power Station	1960	Chimney	Kosovo	Obiliq	120 m	42°40′36.89″N 21°05′8.13″E	
	Chimney A3 of Kosovo A Power Station	1960	Chimney	Kosovo	Obiliq	120 m	42°40′33.34″N 21°05′12.95″E	

== See also ==
- List of tallest buildings in Kosovo
- List of tallest structures in Albania
- List of tallest structures in Serbia
- List of tallest structures in Europe
