= Shijak =

- Municipality
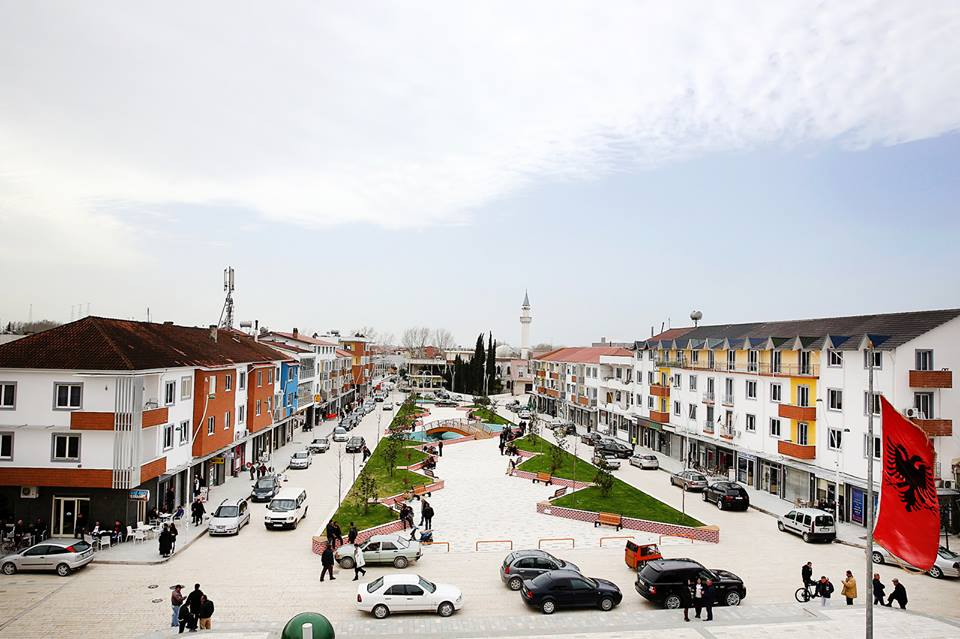

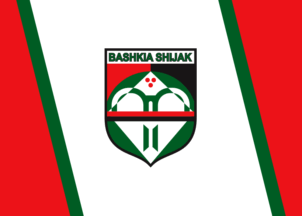
- Flag Emblem

- Location within Albania
- Coordinates: 41°20′44″N 19°34′2″E
- Country: Albania
- County: Durrës

Government
  - Mayor: Elton Arbana (PS)

Area
  - Municipality: 92.294 km^{2} (35.635 sq mi)
- Elevation: 51 m (167 ft)

Population (2023)
  - Municipality: 22,058
  - Municipality density: 239.00/km^{2} (619.00/sq mi)
  - Administrative unit: 5,832
- Time zone: UTC+1 (CET)
  - Summer (DST): UTC+2 (CEST)
- Postal Code: 2013-2014
- Area Code: (0)571
- Website: www.shijak.gov.al

Shijak (Albanian definite form: Shijaku) is a town and a municipality in Durrës County, west-central Albania. The municipality was formed at the 2015 local government reform by the merger of the former municipalities Gjepalaj, Maminas, Shijak and Xhafzotaj, that became municipal units. The seat of the municipality is the town Shijak. The total population is 27,861 (2011 census), in a total area of 92.24 km^{2}. The population of the former municipality at the 2011 census was 7,568.

== Overview ==
Shijak is located 11 km away from the city of Durrës, and 31 km from the city of Tirana. The former municipality had a surface area of about 5 km^{2}, and a reported population of around 12,853 people as of 2007. In reality the population is smaller as many people who claim residency in Shijak actually reside permanently elsewhere. With this taken into account the actual population size is estimated to be around 6,000–7,000 people. Population size has grown at a rate of around 1% per year despite birth rate decreasing at a rate of around 60% from 2003 to 2007. Inward migration of families accounts for this increase. Three neighborhoods comprise Shijak; lagjia e re, lagjia e vjeter, and lagjia erzen. In 2010–2011 the only female mayor in Albania ran Shijak.

== History ==
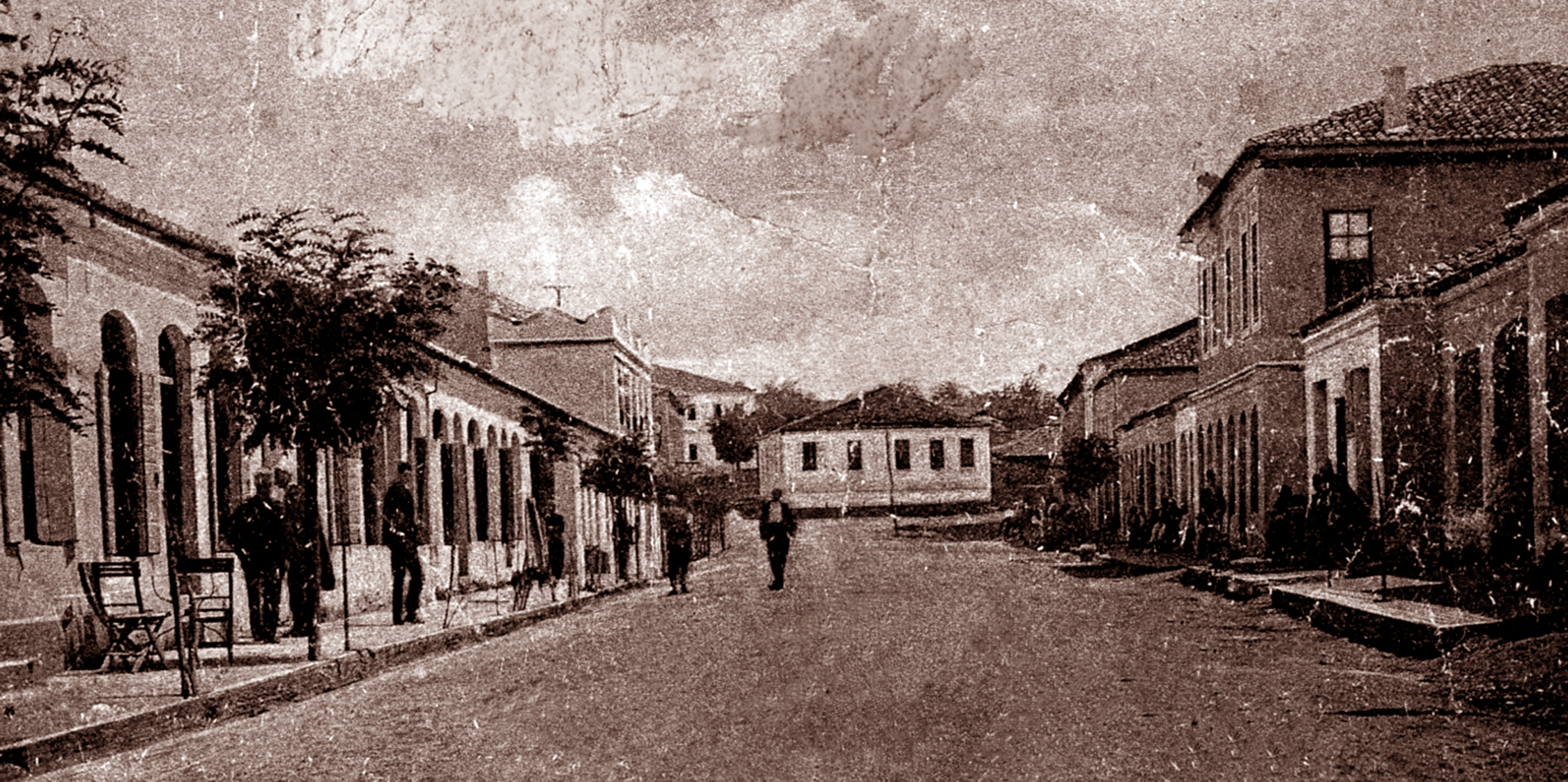
Shijak in 1927.

Shijak has ancient roots, dating back to after the founding of Durrës in 637 B.C. Shijak developed as a satellite site for the Taulantii tribe although under a different name, with the tribe's hub located in Durrës. Later Shijak was named as Shen Jak, translated to "Saint Jacob". Later Shijak would be known as Shenjak, Shejak, Shinjak, then Shijak. The settlement suffered some destruction during the Ottoman invasion including some destruction to the local church.

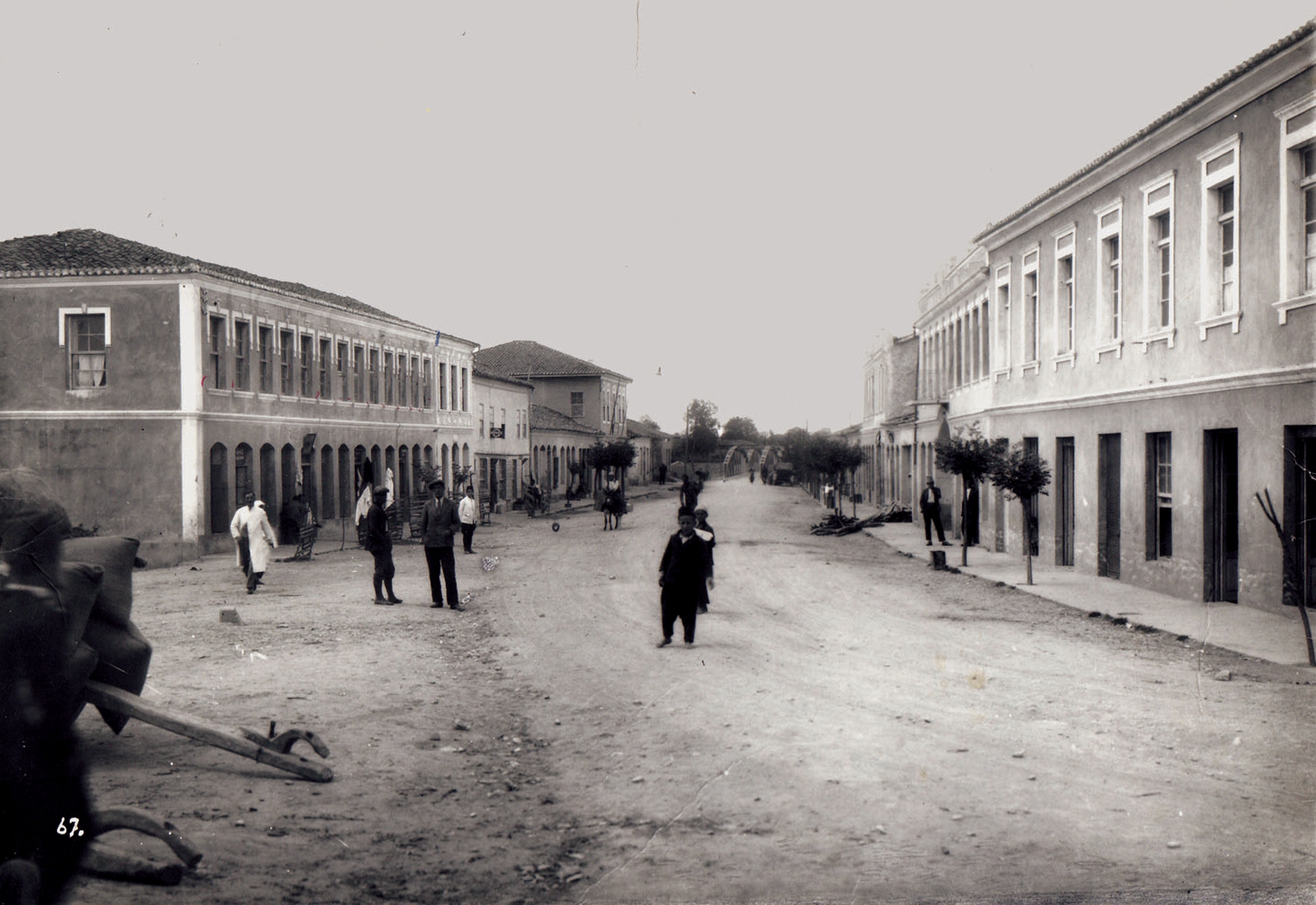
Shijak in 1935.

In 1880 Sali Bej Deliallisi founded Shijak as a village. The population of Shijak grew when Bosniak settlers immigrated into two neighboring villages which later became known as Koxhas and Borakë. Shijak later developed into a town as natural growth occurred and around 1908 people from the cities of Tirana, Kruja, and Shengjergj migrated into Shijak and built residences and shops. Shijak became an official town with a French reconstruction process in 1930.

== Natural and built environment ==
The Erzen river runs through Shijak, and the spring of Gjyshi, spring of Dushku, and Erzen lake are all in the nearby vicinity. Shijak is centered on a flower park, one of two public squares in the municipality. The flower park is bordered by roads with parking. Around the flower park are a variety of shops including tourism agencies, ice cream shops, bars, cafes, restaurants, and small food shops. There are many paved roads in Shijak, but more unpaved. Low one or two-story houses with low walls with gates in front are characteristic of Shijak.

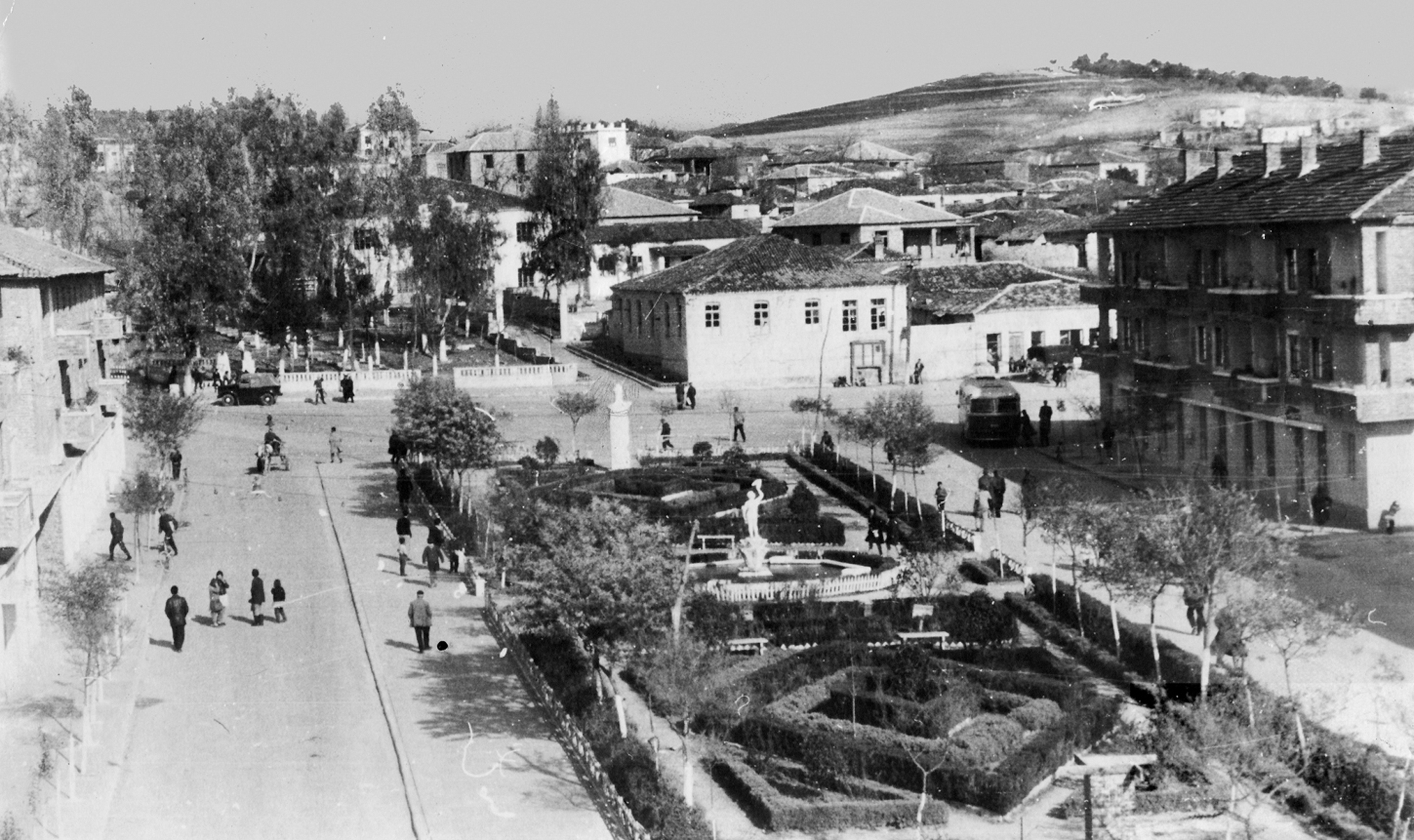
Shijak in 1964.

Taller apartment buildings are also found in Shijak, mostly closer to the center of the town. Small stores are located throughout Shijak's more residential areas. Shijak has one open air market open in the mornings daily, but officially open and crowded on Sundays. Shijak also has a soccer field, which is utilized by both its local soccer team and the national team for practice. Shijak has a community center with meeting space and auditorium but this space is in poor shape. The community center shares a building with the local mosque. The municipality also has a library, post office, health center, police station, Internet places, and other shops. The municipality has two public kindergartens, one private kindergarten, three public nine-year schools, and one public high school. No public transportation exists within Shijak due to its small size. Buses run daily to and from the cities of Durrës and Tirana, and some furgons and taxis are licensed to travel into Shijak from other locations.

== Governance ==
The municipality of Shijak is run by the Bashkia (City Hall). The municipality has around 33 employees and 10 different offices.

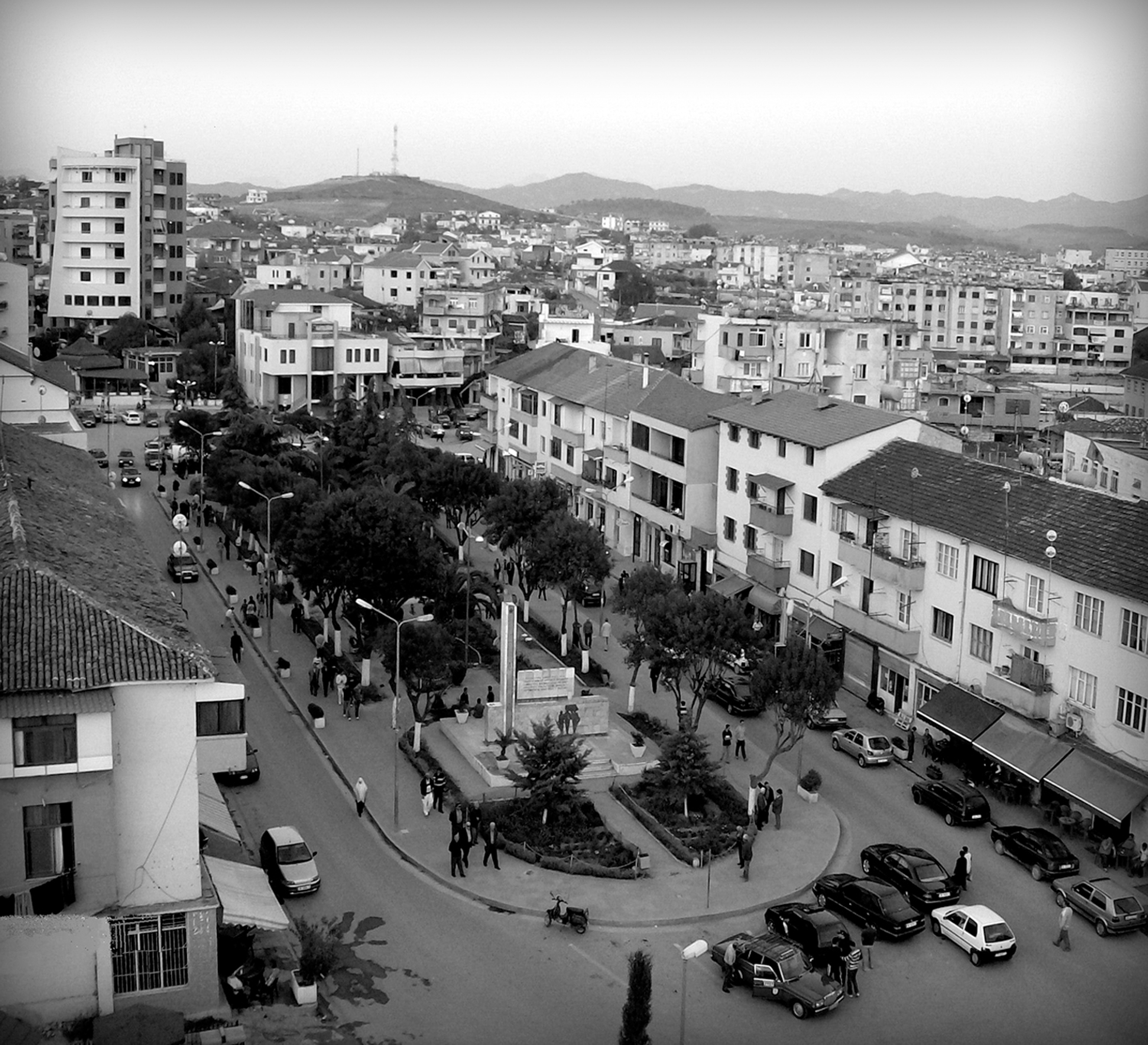
Shijak in 2008.

The Bashkia is headed by the only female municipality mayor in Albania. In 2007 the municipality created a community development plan along with the OSCE, Council of Europe, LGI-Budapest, and the Association of Albanian Municipalities. This plan sets forth goals for the municipality to reach by 2015. The municipality has currently reached many of these goals and is working towards implementing and completing many of the others. Along with the Community Development Plan, Shijak created the Civic Commission in 2008 with five representatives from the community. These representatives are consulted on important decisions in the municipality. Although the committee has five members, it will also invite other important actors to make decisions as well.

== Economy and business ==
Shijak's economy consists largely of the private sector. There are 246 small businesses and 17 large businesses as of 2007. These businesses are largely trade and services. Money also comes into Shijak in the form of remittances from the many Shijak residents living abroad. The local municipality recorded unemployment in 2007 to be at around 10%, but it is considered to be higher when accounting for all the persons able to work. Around 130 homeless families lived in Shijak in 2007.

South of Shijak, there is a broadcasting station for medium wave and shortwave radio.

== Sports ==
Shijak has a soccer team, KF Erzeni, that is currently in the Kategoria e Parë which is the second tier of Albanian football.

== Notable people ==
- Xhelal Deliallisi, signatory of the Albanian Declaration of Independence
- Ymer bej Deliallisi, signatory of the Albanian Declaration of Independence
- Ibrahim Efendiu, signatory of the Albanian Declaration of Independence
- Armand Duka, Head of the Albanian Football Association
- Niko Bespalla, Albanian footballer
- Arbër Çyrbja, Albanian footballer
- Amer Duka, Albanian footballer
- Klement Zguri, Politician
- Ujku I Shijakut, Politician.
