= List of tallest structures in Serbia =

These lists of tallest structures in Serbia rank structures in Serbia by absolute height and buildings by official height (excluding Kosovo). The tallest structure in Serbia is currently the chimney of Thermal power plant Kostolac B which rises 295 m (968 ft).

These lists rank Serbia's tallest completed structures (buildings and towers) by official height, which means spires are included but not antennas.

== Buildings ==
=== Skyscrapers ===
Was the tallest building in Serbia upon completion

List of buildings with a minimum height of 100 m (330 ft) and above.

| Rank | Image | Name | Location | Height | Floors | Year | Notes |
|---|---|---|---|---|---|---|---|
| 1 | | Belgrade Tower | Belgrade | 168 metres (551 ft) | 42 | 2022 | Tallest skyscraper in Belgrade and Serbia since 2022. |
| 2 | | West 65 Tower | Belgrade | 155 metres (509 ft) | 40 | 2021 | Tallest skyscraper in Belgrade and Serbia between 2021 and 2022. |
| 3 | | Skyline AFI Tower | Belgrade | 132 metres (433 ft) | 31 | 2022 | Tallest tower that is part of Skyline Belgrade building complex. |
| 4 | | Western City Gate | Belgrade | 117 metres (384 ft) | 35 | 1979 | Height of the roof - 117m, with restaurant 140m. Tallest skyscraper in Belgrade and Serbia between 1979 and 2021. |
| 5 | | Ušće Tower 1 | Belgrade | 115 metres (377 ft) | 27 | 1964 (reconstructed in 2005) | Height of the roof - 115m, with antenna 141m. Tallest skyscraper in Belgrade and Serbia between 1964 and 1979. |
| 6 | | Ušće Tower 2 | Belgrade | 104 metres (341 ft) | 25 | 2020 | |
| 7 | | Beograđanka | Belgrade | 101 metres (331 ft) | 30 | 1974 | Height with antenna - 127m. |

=== High-rises ===
List of buildings with a height variance from 45 m (148 ft) up to 99 m (325 ft).

| Rank | Image | Name | Location | Height | Floors | Year | Notes |
|---|---|---|---|---|---|---|---|
| 1 | | Inex Tower | Belgrade | 95 metres (312 ft) | 25 | 1978 | |
| 2–4 | | Vojvoda Stepa Towers (3 buildings) | Belgrade | 91 metres (299 ft) | 24 | 1982 | |
| 5 | | Banjica Towers (5 buildings) | Belgrade | 86 metres (282 ft) - 75 metres (246 ft) | 21-27 | | |
| 6–8 | | Eastern City Gates (3 buildings) | Belgrade | 85 metres (279 ft) | 30 | 1976 | Widely misreported as 100m. |
| 9 | | BW Verde | Belgrade | 83 metres (272 ft) | 24 | 2022 | |
| 10–12 | | BW Arcadia | Belgrade | 82 metres (269 ft) | 24 | 2021 | |
| 10–12 | | BW Vista | Belgrade | 82 metres (269 ft) | 23 | 2021 | |
| 10–12 | | BW Parkview | Belgrade | 82 metres (269 ft) | 23 | 2019 | |
| 13 | | TV5 building | Niš | 81 metres (266 ft) | 25 | 1973 | Tallest structure and building in Niš. |
| 14 | | Skyline Belgrade Residential Tower 2 | Belgrade | 77 metres (253 ft) | 27 | 2024 | Tower that is part of Skyline Belgrade building complex. |
| 15 | | Subotica Town Hall | Subotica | 76 metres (249 ft) | N/A | 1910 | Tallest building in Subotica and tallest town hall in Serbia. |
| 16–23 | | Liman 4 Towers (3 buildings) | Novi Sad | 75 metres (246 ft) | 19 | 1990 | Tallest buildings in Novi Sad since 1990. |
| 16–23 | | Block 23 Towers (4 buildings) | Belgrade | 75 metres (246 ft) | 23 | 1974 | |
| 16–23 | | Ipsilon Tower | Kragujevac | 75 metres (246 ft) | 17 | | Tallest structure and building in Kragujevac. |
| 24–25 | | BW Residences (2 buildings) | Belgrade | 72 metres (236 ft) | 20 | 2018 | |
| 26 | | Skyline Belgrade Residential Tower 1 | Belgrade | 68.4 metres (224 ft) | 24 | 2020 | Tower that is part of Skyline Belgrade building complex. |
| 27 | | Auto-kuća building | Niš | 65 metres (213 ft) | 20 | | |
| 28 | | BIGZ building | Belgrade | 64 metres (210 ft) | 11 | 1941 | Tallest building in Belgrade between 1941 and 1964. |
| 29 | | Blvd Nemanjića building | Niš | 62 metres (203 ft) | 19 | | |
| 30 | | Lepa Brena building | Užice | 60 metres (200 ft) | 27 | 1986 | |
| 31 | | Palace Albanija | Belgrade | 58 metres (190 ft) | 13 | 1939 | First high-rise building in the Balkans. Tallest building in Belgrade between 1939 and 1941. |
| 32–33 | | Vega IT building | Novi Sad | 57 metres (187 ft) | 14 | 1952 (reconstructed in 2023) | Previously Novi Sad Open University. Burned down on April 6, 2000. Reconstructed and repurposed on November 30, 2023. |
| 32–33 | | NIS building | Novi Sad | 57 metres (187 ft) | 13 | 1998 | |
| 34–38 | | Ambasador Hotel | Niš | 56 metres (184 ft) | 17 | 1968 | |
| 34–38 | | Beogradski kej Towers (4 buildings) | Novi Sad | 56 metres (184 ft) | 17 | 1968 | |
| 39–40 | | Švajcarija building | Niš | 55 metres (180 ft) | 17 | | |
| 39–40 | | Marger building | Niš | 55 metres (180 ft) | 18 | | |
| 41–45 | | Main Postal Office (2 buildings) | Novi Sad | 54 metres (177 ft) | 12 | 1961 | |
| 41–45 | | Zetska Street Towers (2 buildings) | Niš | 54 metres (177 ft) | 18 | | |
| 41–45 | | Hotel Srbija | Belgrade | 54 metres (177 ft) | 18 | | |
| 46 | | Hotel Slavija | Belgrade | 50 metres (160 ft) | 16 | 1962 | |
| 47 | | Zoned Tower | Novi Sad | 45 metres (148 ft) | 13 | 2011 | |
| | | Hotel Zlatibor (Хотел Златибор, Ужице) | Užice | | 16 | 1981 | |
| | | Military Medical Academy | Belgrade | | 16 | 1984 | |
| | | Agrovojvodina Tower | Novi Sad | | 15 | 1960s | |
| | | NS Office Park | Novi Sad | | 12 | 1983 (reconstructed in 2022) | Previously Novkabel Tower. Reconstructed and repurposed in 2022. |

=== Religious buildings ===
| Rank | Image | Name | Location | Height | Floors | Year | Notes |
|---|---|---|---|---|---|---|---|
| 1 | | Church of Saint Sava | Belgrade | 78.3 metres (257 ft) | N/A | 1989 | Tallest Orthodox church in Serbia. |
| 2 | | Delimeđe Mosque | Delimeđe | 77.2 metres (253 ft) | N/A | 2013 | Tallest mosque minarets in Delimeđe and in Serbia. Tallest mosque minarets in Europe outside of Turkey. |
| 3 | | Church of Saint Stephan (The Carmelite convent) | Sombor | 73.5 metres (241 ft) | N/A | 1904 | Tallest structure and Catholic church in Sombor and tallest catholic church in Serbia. |
| 4 | | Church of Saint Virgin Mary | Bačka Topola | 72.7 metres (239 ft) | N/A | 1906 | Tallest structure and Catholic church in Bačka Topola. |
| 5 | | Name of Mary Church | Novi Sad | 72 metres (236 ft) | N/A | 1894 | Tallest Catholic church in Novi Sad. Tallest structure in Novi Sad between 1894 and 1990. |
| 6 | | St. Theresa of Avila Cathedral | Subotica | 64 metres (210 ft) | N/A | 1797 | Tallest Catholic church in Subotica. |
| 7 | | Church of Saint Gerard | Vršac | 63 metres (207 ft) | N/A | 1863 | Tallest structure and Catholic church in Vršac. |
| 8 | | Church of Saint Roch | Subotica | 62 metres (203 ft) | N/A | 1896 | |
| 9/10 | | Cathedral of St. John of Nepomuk | Zrenjanin | 56 metres (184 ft) | N/A | 1867 | |
| 9/10 | | Church of the Holy Trinity | Sombor | 56 metres (184 ft) | N/A | 1771 | |
| 11 | | Church of the Ascension of Our Lord | Čurug | 55 metres (180 ft) | N/A | 1861 | Tallest structure and Orthodox church in Čurug. |
| 12 | | Church of Saint Anthony of Padua | Bečej | 53.3 metres (175 ft) | N/A | 1904 | Tallest structure and Catholic church in Bečej. |
| 13 | | Church of Saint George | Bečej | 52 metres (171 ft) | N/A | 1854 | Tallest Orthodox church in Bečej. |
| 14 | | Church of the Translation of Relics of Saint Nicholas | Sivac | 51.5 metres (169 ft) | N/A | 1852 | Tallest structure and Orthodox church in Sivac. |
| 15 | | Church of Holy Transfiguration | Pančevo | 48.3 metres (158 ft) | N/A | 1878 | Height of the bell tower 48.3m. Height of the church dome 34.7m. |
| 16 | | Church of Saint George (Senćanska Church or Church of Saint Jure) | Subotica | 45 metres (148 ft) | N/A | 1898 | Height of the bell tower 45m. |
| 17/18 | | Novi Sad Synagogue | Novi Sad | 40 metres (130 ft) | N/A | 1909 | Tallest Neolog Judaism synagogue in Novi Sad. Height of two spired domes 27m. |
| 17/18 | | Subotica Synagogue (Jakab and Komor Square Synagogue) | Subotica | 40 metres (130 ft) | N/A | 1901 | Tallest Neolog Judaism synagogue in Subotica. |
| | | Church of the Dormition of the Holy Virgin | Pančevo | | N/A | 1810 | Tallest Orthodox church in Pančevo. |
| | | Church of the Sacred Heart of Jesus | Futog | | N/A | 1908 | Tallest structure and Catholic church in Futog. |
| | | Church of the Assumption of Mary | Jaša Tomić | | N/A | 1911 | Tallest structure and Catholic church in Jaša Tomić. |
| | | Church of Saint Michael (The Franciscan convent) | Subotica | | N/A | 1730 | |

== Other ==
=== Towers ===
| Rank | Image | Name | Location | Height | Floors | Year | Notes |
|---|---|---|---|---|---|---|---|
| 1 | | Stubline transmitter | Obrenovac | 225 metres (738 ft) | N/A | 1952 (reconstructed in 2009) | Destroyed in 1999 NATO air strikes and reconstructed in 2009. |
| 2 | | Subotica TV mast | Subotica | 219 metres (719 ft) | N/A | 1965 | Tallest structure in Subotica. |
| 3 | | Avala Tower | Belgrade | 205 metres (673 ft) | 38 | 1965 (reconstructed in 2009) | Destroyed in 1999 NATO air strikes and reconstructed in 2009. |
| 4 | | Ada Bridge | Belgrade | 200 metres (660 ft) | N/A | 2012 | Tallest bridge pylon in Belgrade and in Serbia. World's longest single-pylon cable-stayed bridge. |
| 5 | | Iriški Venac Tower | Iriški venac | 170 metres (560 ft) | N/A | 1975 | Tallest structure in Novi Sad. Partly damaged in 1999 NATO air strikes. |
| 6 | | Srbobran transmitter | Srbobran | 148 metres (486 ft) | N/A | | Tallest structure in Srbobran. |
| 7 | | Belgrade Nikola Tesla Airport traffic control tower | Belgrade | 75 metres (246 ft) | N/A | 2021 | Tallest air traffic control tower in Serbia. |

=== Chimneys ===
| Rank | Image | Name | Location | Height | Floors | Year | Notes |
|---|---|---|---|---|---|---|---|
| 1 | | Chimney of TPP Kostolac B | Kostolac | 295 metres (968 ft) | N/A | 1985 | Tallest structure in Požarevac and in Serbia. (Excluding Kosovo) |
| 2 | | Chimney of TPP Nikola Tesla B | Obrenovac | 280 metres (920 ft) | N/A | 1983 | Tallest structure in Obrenovac. |
| 3 | | Chimney of TPP Nikola Tesla A | Obrenovac | 220 metres (720 ft) | N/A | 1970 | |
| 4 | | Chimney of Zrenjanin heating plant | Zrenjanin | 170 metres (560 ft) | N/A | 1989 | Tallest structure in Zrenjanin. |
| 5 | | Chimney of Novi Sad heating plant | Novi Sad | 160 metres (520 ft) | N/A | 1983 | |
| 6/7 | | Chimney of Hesteel Serbia plant | Smederevo | 150 metres (490 ft) | N/A | 1968 | Tallest structure in Smederevo. |
| 6/7 | | Chimney of Pančevo Oil Refinery | Pančevo | 150 metres (490 ft) | N/A | 1968 | Tallest structure in Pančevo. |
| 8 | | Chimney of Dunav heating plant | Belgrade | 140 metres (460 ft) | N/A | 1987 | Tallest structure in Belgrade. |
| 9 | | Chimney of Zijin Bor Copper plant | Bor | 120 metres (390 ft) | N/A | 1961 | Tallest structure in Bor. |
| 10 | | Chimneys of TPP Kostolac A | Kostolac | 106 metres (348 ft) | N/A | 1967 | |

== List of tallest structures under construction, proposed or approved ==
| Rank | Name | Location | Height | Floors | Status | Construction start / completion |
|---|---|---|---|---|---|---|
| 1 | Green Line (Block 4 Commercial Building) | Belgrade | 160 metres (520 ft) | N/A | Preparations | |
| 2–3 | Danube Riverside | Belgrade | 2 x 155 metres (509 ft) | N/A | Under construction | |
| 4 | Tempo Tower | Belgrade | 120 metres (390 ft) | 34 | Preparation | |
| 4–7 | Green Line (3 Block 3 Commercial Buildings) | Belgrade | 120 metres (390 ft) - 112 metres (367 ft) | N/A | Preparations | |
| 8–10 | M2 Tower | Belgrade | 100 metres (330 ft) | 13 | Approved | |
| 8–10 | InterContinental Beograd | Belgrade | 2 x 100 metres (330 ft) | N/A | Under construction | |

== See also ==
- List of tallest buildings in Serbia
- List of tallest structures in Kosovo
- List of tallest buildings in Bosnia and Herzegovina
  - List of tallest structures in Republika Srpska
- List of tallest buildings in Montenegro
- List of tallest buildings in North Macedonia
- List of tallest buildings in Croatia
- List of tallest buildings in Slovenia
- List of tallest structures in Europe
