= List of tallest buildings in Kosovo =

This is a comprehensive list of the most noteworthy and tallest buildings in Kosovo.

== Skyscrapers ==
List of buildings with a minimum height of 150 m (490 ft).

No.	Name	Image	Location	Height	Floors	Architect	Developer	Year
1	FM Tower		Pristina; 42.65695°N 21.15233°E	230 m (750 ft)	47	Chapman Taylor	MP Group	u/c

== Highrises ==
List of buildings with a height variance from 100 m (330 ft) up to 149 m (489 ft).

No.	Name	Image	Location	Height	Floors	Architect	Developer	Year
1	Prishtina City Center		Pristina; 42.65737°N 21.15330°E	132 m (433 ft)	32, 29	DB.A Architects	Alba Group	u/c
2	Kulla Prishtina		Pristina; 42.65955°N 21.17090°E	105 m (344 ft)	25	Maden Group	Driloni Com	u/c
3	Dukagjini Residence		Pristina; 42.65330°N 21.14773°E	100 m (330 ft)	24	DB.A Architects	Dukagjini Group	u/c
4	Marigona Tower		Pristina; 42.65678°N 21.15181°E	100 m (330 ft)	25	Archides	Marigona Tower sh.p.k	2025

== General Urban Developments ==
List of buildings with a maximum height of 99 m (325 ft).

No.	Name	Image	Location	Height	Floors	Architect	Developer	Year
1	Donika II		Pristina; 42.65563°N 21.15302°E	92 m (302 ft)	22, 21, 20	Horizons Group	Benidona	u/c
2	Arting Highrise		Pristina; 42.65570°N 21.15143°E	90 m (300 ft)	23	Arting LLC	Arting LLC	2019
3	Rilindja Building		Pristina; 42.65959°N 21.15610°E	89 m (292 ft)	19	Georgi Konstantinovski	Government of Yugoslavia	1980
4	Prime Residence III		Pristina; 42.65662°N 21.15140°E	88 m (289 ft)	26	Prime Group	Prime Group	u/c
5	Prime Residence II		Pristina; 42.65641°N 21.15087°E	86 m (282 ft)	25	Prime Group	Prime Group	u/c
6	Baci Towers		Ferizaj; 42.37159°N 21.14846°E	80 m (260 ft)	24, 24	Db.A Architechts	Dakoon Investments	u/c
7	NPB Complex		Pristina; 42.65387°N 21.14838°E	—	25, 22, 21, 17	—	—	u/c
8	KW Center		Pristina; 42.65602°N 21.15126°E	—	24, 22	—	—	u/c
9	Kuka Tower		Pristina; 42.65515°N 21.15267°E	77 m (253 ft)	22	—	Hysi Group	u/c
10	Glowing Tower		Pristina; 42.63720°N 21.15388°E	72.11 m (236.6 ft)	18	GRAND Design & Consulting	Glowing Group	u/c
11	Prime Minister's Office		Pristina; 42.66429°N 21.16370°E	61 m (200 ft)	—	Government of Kosovo	Government of Kosovo	—
12	KEK Building		Pristina; 42.65520°N 21.15834°E	58 m (190 ft)	—	—	—	—
13	Grand Hotel Prishtina		Pristina; 42.65996°N 21.16010°E	52 m (171 ft)	14	—	Government of Yugoslavia	1978
14	State Prosecutor Building		Pristina; 42.66415°N 21.16046°E	48 m (157 ft)	—	—	—	—
15	RTK Building		Pristina; 42.65765°N 21.16079°E	40 m (130 ft)	—	—	Government of Yugoslavia	—
16	PTK Headquarters		Pristina	—	—	—	Government of Yugoslavia	—

== Monuments ==
No.	Name	Image	Location	Height	Architect	Developer	Year
1	Mother Teresa Cathedral Tower		Pristina; 42.65632°N 21.15946°E	70 m (230 ft)	—	Government of Kosovo	2010
2	Clock Tower, Pristina		Pristina; 42.66674°N 21.16727°E	26 m (85 ft)	—	—	19th century
3	Jashar Pasha Mosque Minaret		Pristina; 42.66601°N 21.16631°E	—	—	—	1834
4	Gazimestan Monument		Fushë Kosovë; 42.69063°N 21.12374°E	25 m (82 ft)	Aleksandar Deroko	Government of Yugoslavia	1953
5	Çarshia Mosque Minaret		Pristina; 42.66550°N 21.16541°E	—	—	—	15th century

== See also ==
- List of tallest structures in Kosovo
- List of tallest buildings in Albania
- List of tallest buildings in Serbia
- List of tallest buildings in Europe
