= Xhemal Deliallisi =

Albanian nationalist (1880–1941)

- Born: 1880; Shijak, Ottoman Empire
- Died: 1941 (aged 60–61); Tirana, Albania
- Parent: Sali bey Deliallisi (father)

Xhemal Deliallisi (1880–1941) was an Albanian politician. He was a prominent figure in the Shijak area of Albania. He was one of 40 signatories of the Albanian Declaration of Independence alongside his cousin Ymer Deliallisi. His tribe was one of the most influential in the area of central Albania where as his father, Sali bey Deliallisi, is thought to have been the founder of the modern city of Shijak.

== Life ==
Xhemal Deliallisi was born in 1880 in Shijak. His father Sali bey Deliallisi is thought to have been the founder of the modern city located along the Erzen River, near Durrës. He received his first lessons in the school of his hometown. He knew several foreign languages, such as Persian, Ottoman and Italian. In 1903 he started working in the administration of Shijak sub-prefecture, where he worked for several years. Under the influence of Dom Nikollë Kaçorri, Murat of Said Toptani, but also of the patriots in Thessaloniki, Bucharest and Istanbul with whom he had correspondences, he joined the national movement for independence. In the years 1908–1910 he openly positioned himself against the new policies of the Young Turks for the centralization of power. In autumn of 1912 he was one of the organizers of the volunteer fighters from Shijak for the protection of Shkodra from the Montenegrin and Serbian occupation. In November 1912 he was elected Shijak delegate to the historic Assembly of Declaration of Independence along with his cousin Ymer Deliallisi. They accompanied Ismail Qemali who arrived from Trieste in Durrës to the city of Vlorë. Jamal Deliathisi signed the Declaration of Independence with the Ottoman script "Xhemmalyyddin bej". The Provisional Government of Vlorë for some time charged him with the task of assisting Lef Nosi in the Ministry of Posts and Telegraphs. He welcomed the arrival of Prince Wied and served in his administration in Durrës. In 1924 he supported the Fan Noli uprising and became a strong supporter of his government. After the fall of Noli's government he emigrated to Italy, where he stayed until 1927, when he returned to his homeland and then settled in Tirana. Although old, he followed with interest the political and social developments of the country. He died in 1941.
