= Niko Bespalla =

Albanian footballer (1938–2017)

Personal information
- Date of birth: 1 January 1938
- Place of birth: Shijak, Durrës, Albania
- Date of death: 28 March 2017 (aged 79)
- Height: 1.72 m (5 ft 8 in)
- Position: Forward

Youth career
- Puna Durrës

Senior career*
| Years | Team | Apps | (Gls) |
| 1956–1957 | Puna Durrës | | |
| 1957–1960 | Partizani Tirana | | |
| 1960 | Lokomotiva Durrës | 0 | (0) |
| 1961–1962 | Dinamo Tirana | | |
| 1962–1963 | Erzeni | | |
| 1963–1967 | Lokomotiva Durrës | | |
| 1964 | → Partizani Tirana (loan) | | |
- * Club domestic league appearances and goals

Niko Bespalla (1938 – 28 March 2017) was an Albanian footballer. Famous for his fierce shooting, he played for Lokomotiva Durrës, Partizani Tirana, Dinamo Tirana and Erzeni Shijak in his career.

== Club career ==
He grew up in Durrës along with parents and his two sisters, which is where he began playing football with the youth team of Puna Durrës. He captained the Durrës under-19 side to the national championship before being promoted to the senior team by then coach Adem Karapici in 1957 at the age of 19. In 1957, he was summoned to fulfil his military service and subsequently joined army club Partizani Tirana with whom he won two league titles.

== Personal life ==
Bespalla was born in Durrës in 1938 into a Russian family who had moved to Albania in the 1920s, first living in Tirana before settling in Durrës. His father, Spiridon Bespalov, married his mother Varvara in Podgorica, and then changed their last name from Bespalov to Bespalla. He was jailed for 7 years by the Communist regime in 1967 after allegedly stealing tin .

He was married to Flora and his only surviving child Justin Bespalla was also a footballer who played for Teuta Durrës and Erzeni Shijak amongst others. He died on 28 March 2017, aged 79.

== Honours ==
- Kategoria Superiore: 2

1958, 1959
