= Suma Kumanovo =

Building in Kumanovo, North Macedonia

SUMA Tower is the tallest building in Kumanovo, North Macedonia.

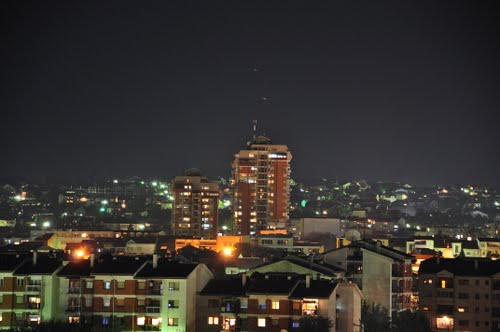
SUMA tower at night

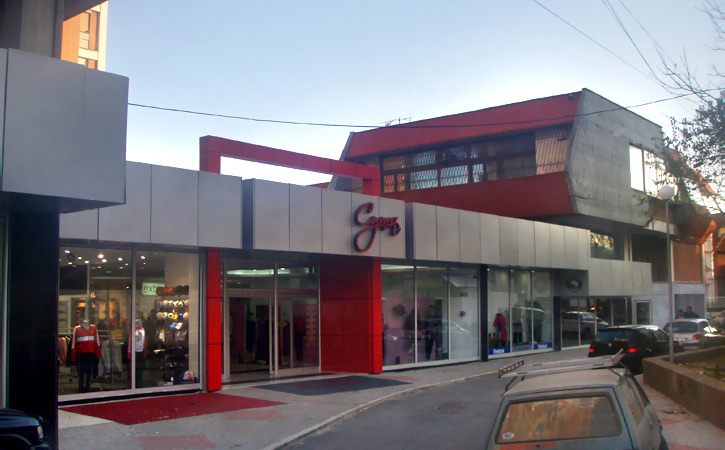
Entrance to SUMA Shopping Center in Kumanovo

The building has 18 floors of residential space, plus 2 floors of commercial space where a modern shopping center is located alongside offices of engineering companies, organizations etc.
