= Fllakë transmitter =

Former broadcasting facility in Albania

The Fllake transmitter was the largest broadcasting facility in Albania. It was situated at Fllakë near Durrës and was the home of several very powerful AM transmitters, which were receivable in the whole of Europe. The facility was built in the communist era as the ARRT-Radio mast, which, with a height of 126 metres, is the highest mast of the station. All masts were demolished in 2019.

== Coordinates ==
- 41°21′37″N 19°30′57″E: 108 metres tall mast
- 41°21′40″N 19°30′29″E: 126 metres tall mast (ARRT-antenna)
- 41°21′54″N 19°29′58″E: 108 metres tall mast
- 41°21′53″N 19°30′02″E: 108 metres tall mast
- 41°21′53″N 19°30′07″E: 108 metres tall mast
- 41°21′55″N 19°29′58″E: 108 metres tall mast
- 41°21′53″N 19°30′11″E: 108 metres tall mast
- 41°21′55″N 19°30′02″E: 108 metres tall mast
- 41°21′55″N 19°30′07″E: 108 metres tall mast
- 41°21′55″N 19°30′11″E: 108 metres tall mast
- 41°22′01″N 19°30′28″E: 109 metres tall mast
- 41°22′02″N 19°30′27″E: 109 metres tall mast
- 41°22′04″N 19°30′32″E: 109 metres tall mast
- 41°22′05″N 19°30′30″E: 108 metres tall mast
- 41°21′57″N 19°31′05″E: 108 metres tall mast
- 41°21′58″N 19°31′01″E: 108 metres tall mast
- 41°22′00″N 19°30′57″E: 109 metres tall mast
- 41°22′02″N 19°30′53″E: 109 metres tall mast
- 41°21′58″N 19°31′06″E: 108 metres tall mast
- 41°22′00″N 19°31′02″E: 108 metres tall mast
- 41°22′02″N 19°30′58″E: 108 metres tall mast
- 41°22′04″N 19°30′54″E: 109 metres tall mast

== See also ==
- Shijak transmitter
