= Ymer Deliallisi =

Albanian politician (1872–1944)

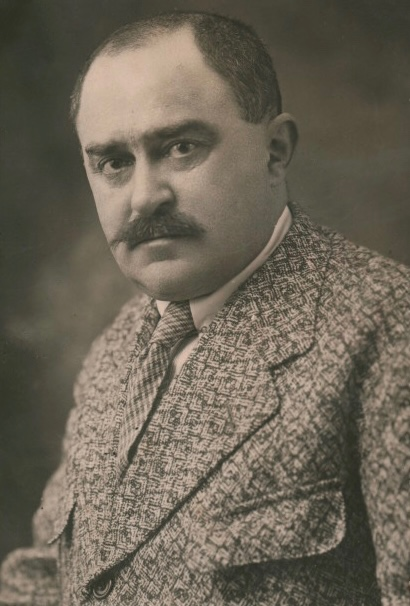
Ymer Deliallisi

Ymer Deliallisi (1872–1944) was a 19th-century Albanian politician. He was one of the signatories of the Albanian Declaration of Independence. His cousin was, Xhelal Deliallisi, signatory of the Albanian Declaration of Independence.
