= Fllakë =

- Village
- Location within Albania
- Coordinates: 41°22′10″N 19°30′15″E
- Country: Albania
- County: Durrës
- Municipality: Durrës
- Administrative unit: Katund i Ri
- Time zone: UTC+1 (CET)
  - Summer (DST): UTC+2 (CEST)

Fllakë is a village in the Durrës County, western Albania. At the 2015 local government reform it became part of the municipality Durrës. It is the site of the Fllakë transmitter. It is inhabited by Albanians.
