= Shijak transmitter =

Shijak transmitter was a broadcasting station for mediumwave and shortwave south of Shijak, Albania. It had 5 masts taller than 100 metres, whereby the tallest mast with a height of 130 metres was the tallest man-made structure in Albania. All antennas were demolished in 2019.

== Coordinates ==
- 41°19′43″N 19°33′20″E: 130 metres tall mast
- 41°19′54″N 19°32′53″E: 111 metres tall mast
- 41°19′51″N 19°32′51″E: 112 metres tall mast
- 41°19′44″N 19°32′52″E: 112 metres tall mast
- 41°19′47″N 19°32′49″E: 111 metres tall mast

== See also ==
- Fllake transmitter
