= Cevahir Towers =

Tallest skyscrapers in North Macedonia

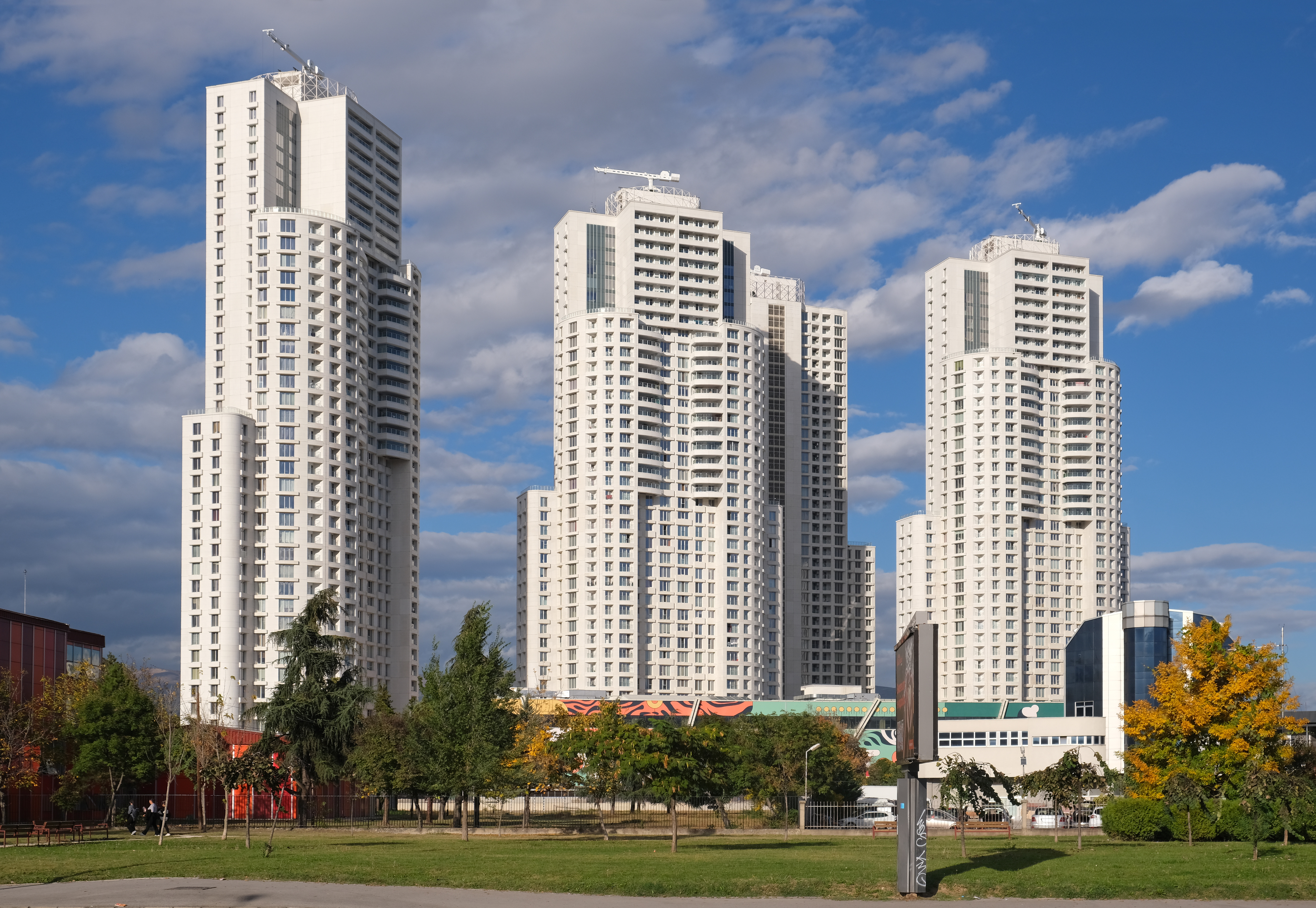
- Interactive map of the Cevahir Towers area

General information
- Status: Completed
- Type: Residential, commercial
- Location: Srbija Boulevard; Skopje, North Macedonia
- Coordinates: 41°58′47″N 21°27′58″E
- Construction started: 2011; 15 years ago
- Completed: 2020; 6 years ago
- Owner: Turk-Mak

Height
- Architectural: 142 m (466 ft)

Technical details
- Floor count: 40 (+2 underground parkings)
- Floor area: 5,600 m^{2} (60,000 sq ft)

Design and construction
- Main contractor: Cevahir Holding

Website
- www.cevahirskycity.mk

Cevahir Towers (Macedonian: Кули Џевахир, pronounced [kuli ˈd͡ʒɛvaxir]; also known as Cevahir Sky City (Macedonian: Џевахир скај сити; pronounced [ˈd͡ʒɛvaxir skaj siti]) is the tallest building complex in Skopje, as well as on the whole territory of North Macedonia. These skyscrapers are 142 m (466 ft) tall with 42 floors. The construction of the complex started in 2011 and finished in 2020.

The investor of the towers is the Turkish company Cevahir Holding, through its Macedonian subsidiary Turk-Mak. Cevahir Sky City is a mixed-use development consisting of four high-rise luxury residential towers and high-end retail shopping mall. With 1376 apartments available in a number of apartment types with varying sizes ranging from 52.08 to 600.94 m^{2} (560.6 to 6,468.5 sq ft). The Sky Towers offer a number of services for its residents, including reception, 24/7 concierge, lounge, public wi-fi, technical support, and a children's playing area.

The Sky City has 5,600 m^{2} (60,000 sq ft) of the ground floor reserved for sports and leisure facilities including squash courts, table tennis, three all-season swimming pools, fitness and aerobic gyms, dressing rooms, and showers.

It also includes around-the-clock 24/7 security, CCTV surveillance of common areas and card access to designated areas, high-tech fire alarm systems, an intercom system, and fire & freight elevators.

In 2019, the former President Gjorge Ivanov, after the mandate, moved his cabinet that legally belongs to him in one of the Cevahir Towers.

== Music event ==
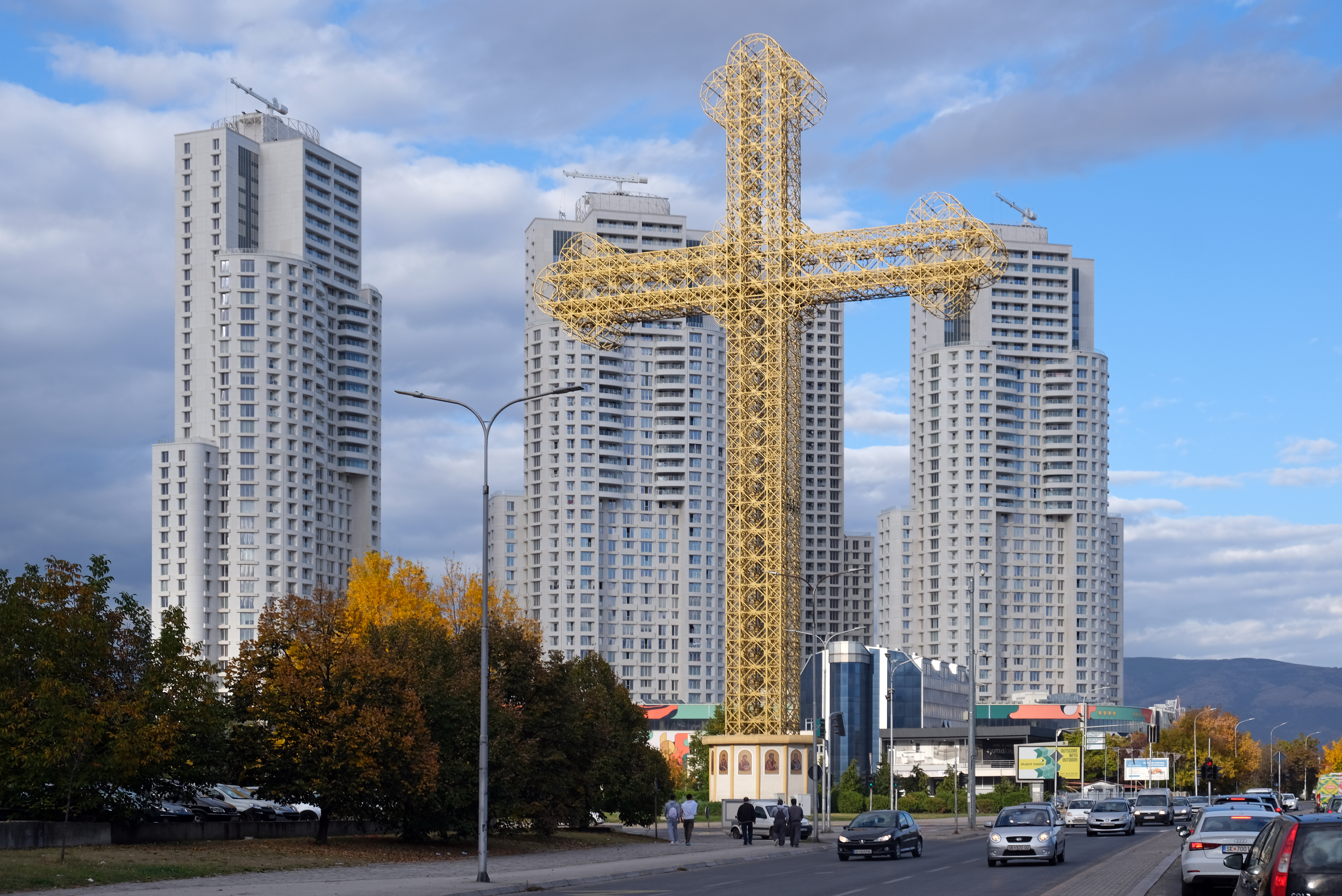
Macedonian Cross and Cevahir Towers.

=== About ===
There was a big musical event that happened in the Cevahir Sky City Complex roof on Sunday, May 3, 2020, during the COVID-19 pandemic in North Macedonia. It started at 6:45 PM. The residents of Aerodrom and the tenants of the Cevahir Sky City complex enjoyed the live music performance of Nade Talevska and Goran Naumovski, Trinity Strings, and DJ Todoroff from their TV's at home, as well as a live stream on Facebook.

Jevahir Holding and the municipality of Aerodrom thanked everyone who organized the event from the roof of Cevahir by giving them a thank-you letter for their creativity and hard work.

=== Performance ===
==== Awards ====
The performance of the musicians who enabled the residents of the Cevahir complex, the residents of Aerodrom, but also all Skopje citizens who had watched the event via live stream and outside their houses, enjoyed the beautiful music and in that way, although separated, spent a beautiful evening together, without any compensation. Therefore, in gratitude for their contribution to raising the spirits of the citizens in the time of the pandemic, Cevahir Sky City, in addition to thanking them, awarded them "Sky Wellness VIP Cards," with a duration of 3 months, for using SPA centers, swimming pools and gyms within the complex. A thank-you letter was also presented by Cevahir Sky City to the Mayor of the Municipality of Aerodrom, Zlatko Marin, as well as the musicians.

=== Contributors ===
List of all members who organized and contributed to the music event:

- Cevahir Holding – investor of Cevahir Towers.
- Goran Naumovski – Macedonian singer.
- Nade Talevska – Macedonian singer.
- Toše Todorov – known as DJ Todoroff, a Macedonian DJ.
- Trinity Strings – Macedonian female band consisting of three musicians: Irena Stojanovska, Aleksandra Marsinova and Marta Kuč.
- Zlatko Marin – Former Mayor of the Municipality of Aerodrom.

== Seismic stability ==
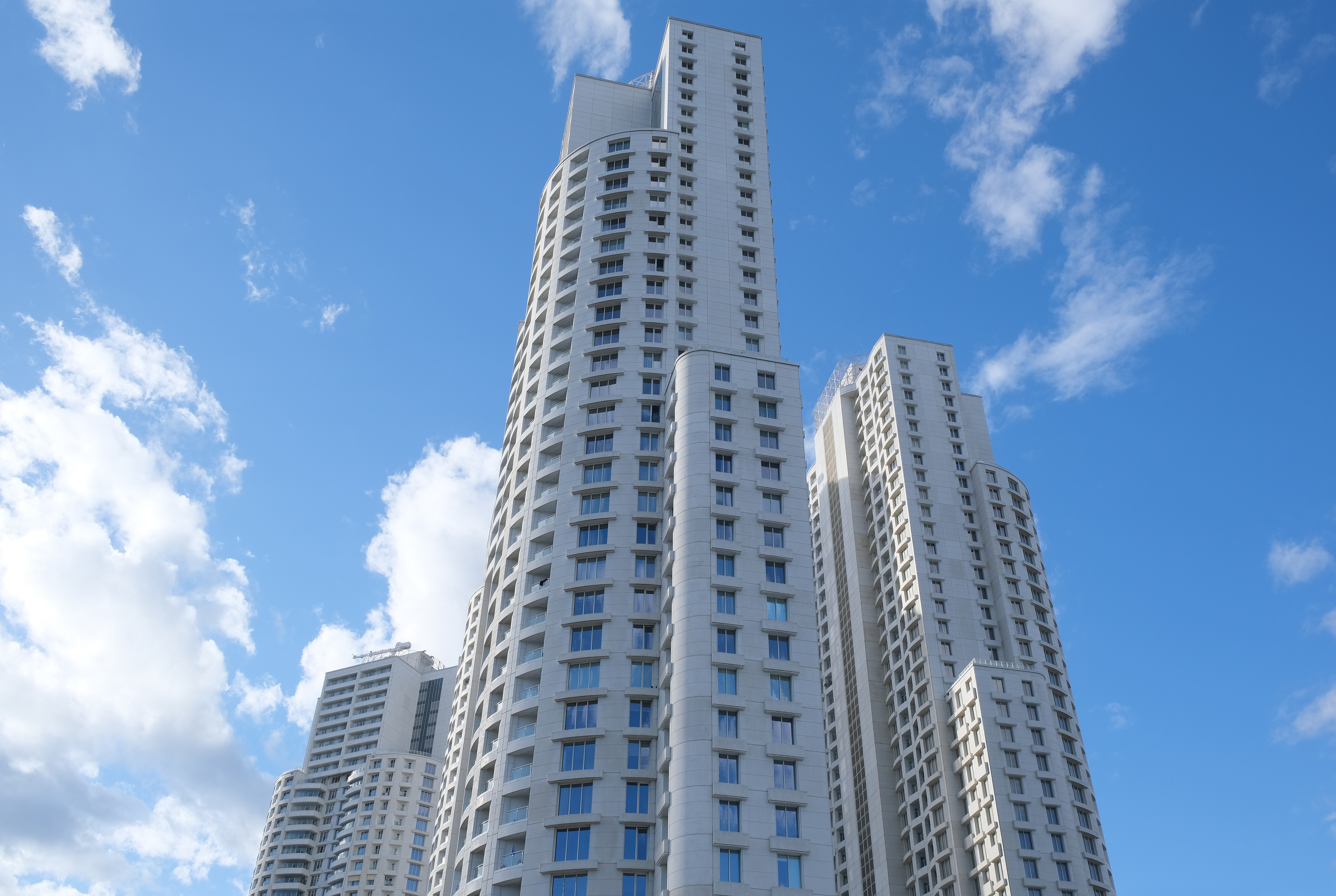
View of the towers.

On April 20, 2016, The Institute of Earthquake Engineering and Seismology in Skopje tested the seismic stability of the towers at the Cevahir Sky City complex. The testing with the technique of forced and ambient vibrations simulated an earthquake of about 4 degrees, and through the 200 measuring points placed on one of the 40 floors of Cevahir, an accurate geometric picture was obtained of the movement of the building under the action of the artificial earthquake. Dr. Mihail Garevski, professor and director of the IEES said:

When it comes to local earthquakes, taller buildings have greater flexibility of support given that the construction period is 2 seconds, and when it comes to the Skopje local earthquakes, they have a period of 0.3 to 0.5 seconds of activity, which means that local earthquakes need more power or in fact, can't even push up such buildings. That is why I have repeatedly stated that tall buildings are recommended as buildings for Skopje and other cities. These buildings are more sensitive to distant earthquakes which, due to their low energy, will not have a destructive effect.

By conducting such tests, the dynamic characteristics of the buildings were examined, which is their identity card for safety, especially in earthquake conditions.

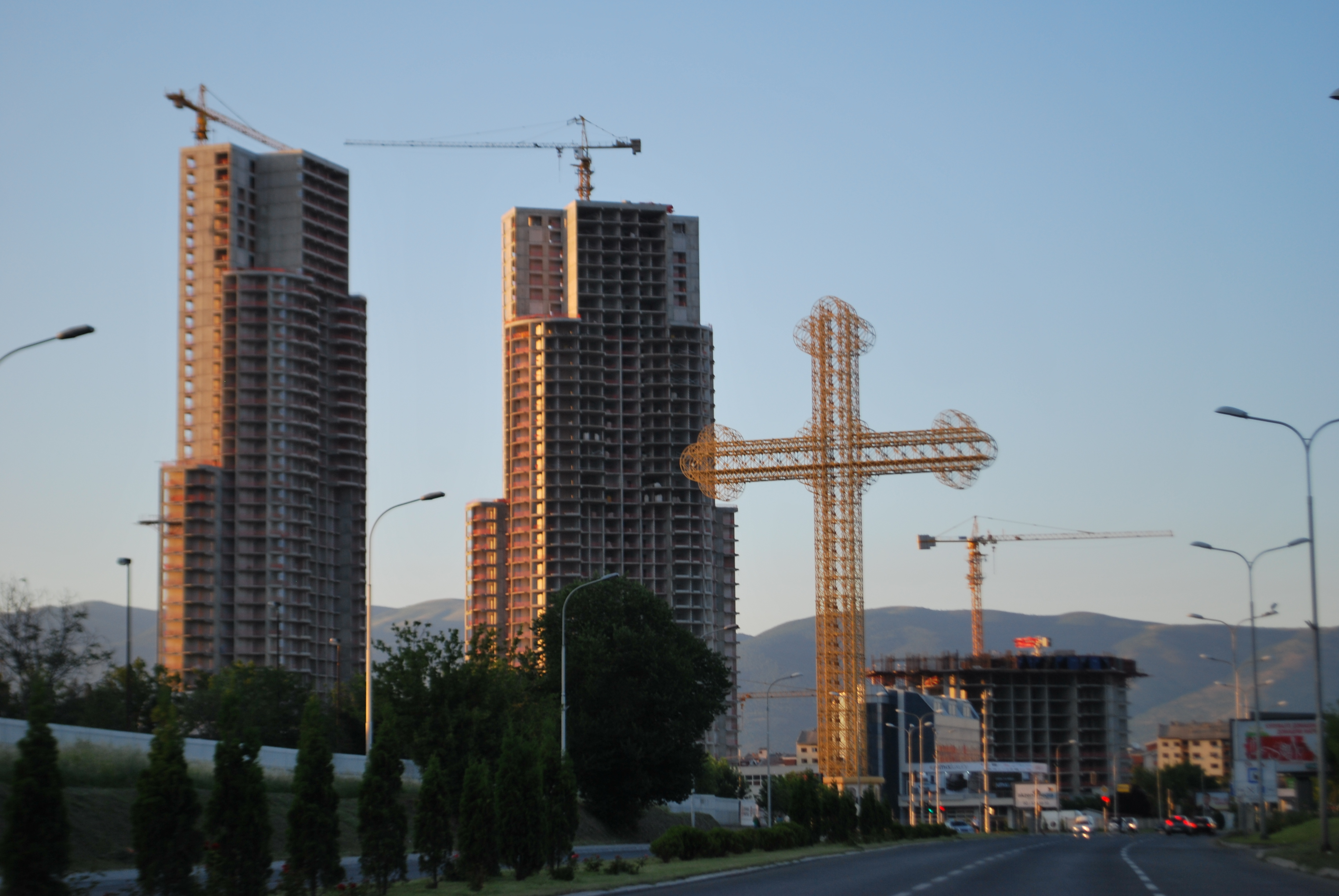
The towers under-construction in June 2013
