= Karpoš =

Karpoš Карпош
- Neighbourhood
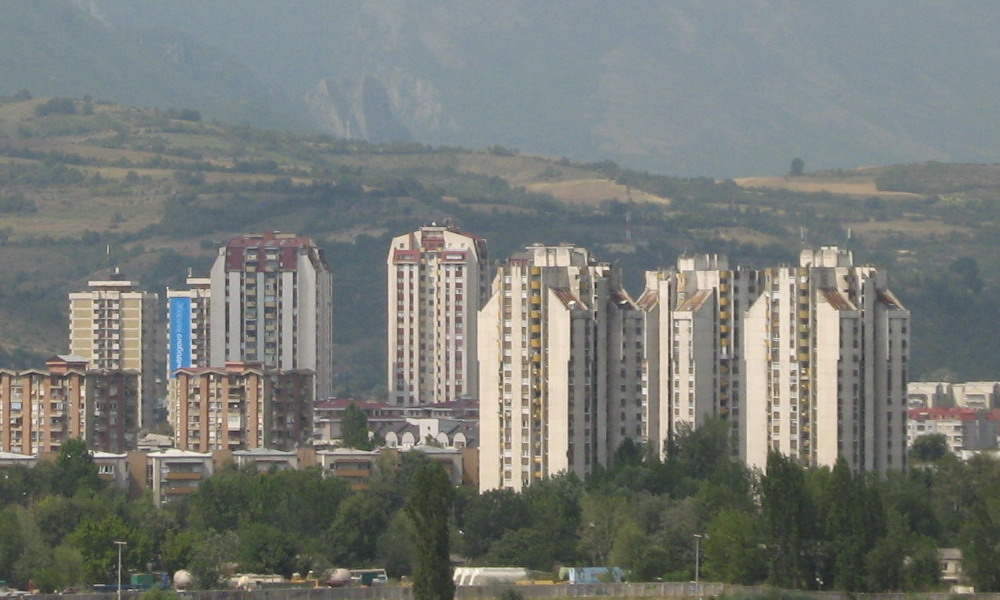

- Location within North Macedonia
- Coordinates: 42°0′N 21°24′E
- Country: North Macedonia
- Region: Skopje
- Municipality: Karpoš

Population (2021)
  - Total: 61,288
- Time zone: UTC+1 (CET)
  - Summer (DST): UTC+2 (CEST)
- Car plates: SK
- Website: .

Karpoš (Macedonian: Карпош) is a neighbourhood in the Karpoš Municipality, City of Skopje, North Macedonia, and the seat of Karpoš Municipality. It is named after the famous Karposh hero.

== Demographics ==
As of the 2021 census, Karpoš had 61,288 residents with the following ethnic composition:

- Macedonians 49,483
- Persons for whom data are taken from administrative sources 5,238
- Albanians 2,203
- Serbs 1,593
- Roma 597
- Vlachs 477
- Turks 430
- Bosniaks 185
- Others 1,082

According to the 2002 census, the neighbourhood had a total of 37,162 inhabitants. Ethnic groups in the town include:

- Macedonians 33,948
- Serbs 1,503
- Vlachs 308
- Albanians 226
- Turks 196
- Bosniaks 68
- Romani 54
- Others 859

== Sports ==
The local football club is FK Lokomotiva Skopje who play in the Lokomotiva Stadium.
