= Karpoš Municipality =

Municipality of North Macedonia

Coordinates: 42.00°N 21.40°E

Karpoš Municipality Општина Карпош
- City municipality (Urban)
- Flag Coat of arms

- Country: North Macedonia
- Region: Skopje
- Municipal seat: Karpoš

Government
  - Mayor: Sotir Lukrovski (VMRO)

Area
  - Total: 105 km^{2} (41 sq mi)

Population
  - Total: 63,760
- Time zone: UTC+1 (CET)
- Website: http://karpos.gov.mk

Karpoš Municipality (Macedonian: Карпош) is one of the ten municipalities that make up the city of Skopje, the capital of the Republic of North Macedonia.

== Geography ==
Karpoš borders:

- Saraj Municipality and Ǵorče Petrov Municipality to the west,
- Čučer-Sandevo Municipality to the north,
- Butel Municipality to the northeast,
- Čair Municipality, Centar Municipality and Kisela Voda Municipality to the east, and
- Sopište Municipality to the south.

== Demographics ==
According to the 2002 Macedonia census, Karpoš had 59,666 inhabitants. According to the 2021 North Macedonia census, this municipality has 63,760 inhabitants. Ethnic groups in the municipality include:

	2002		2021	
	Number	%	Number	%
TOTAL	59,666	100	63,760	100
Macedonians	52,810	88.51	51,609	80.94
Albanians	1,952	3.27	2,324	3.64
Serbs	2,184	3.66	1,635	2.56
Roma	615	1.03	600	0.94
Vlachs	407	0.68	483	0.76
Turks	334	0.56	443	0.69
Bosniaks	98	0.16	192	0.3
Other / Undeclared / Unknown	1,266	2.13	1,126	1.78
Persons for whom data are taken from administrative sources			5,348	8.39

== Twin towns ==
Karpoš Municipality is twinned with the following towns:

- Novi Beograd, Serbia
- Sremski Karlovci, Serbia
- Lapithos, Northern Cyprus
- Fleury-sur-Orne, France, since 2012.

=== Twin municipalities ===
- (Bulgaria) Triaditsa, Sofia
