= Creative city (disambiguation) =

Creative city is an urban planning concept.

Creative City or Creative Cities may refer to:

- Creative City, Emirati economic zone
- Chiang Mai Creative City, A Thailand project
- Creative Cities Network, a project under the patronage of UNESCO
- The Creative City, a 1995 book by Charles Landry, influential for the "creative city" concept

== See also ==
- Creative economy (economic system)
