= Who's Your City? =

Book by Richard Florida

- Author: Richard Florida
- Subject: Environmental psychology, Creative class
- Genre: Non-fiction
- Publisher: Basic Books, Random House
- Publication date: March 2008
- Media type: Print
- Pages: 374
- ISBN: 978-0-465-00352-5
- OCLC: 316823460
- Dewey Decimal: 304.2/3 22
- LC Class: GF21 .F56 2008

Who's Your City?: How the Creative Economy Is Making Where You Live the Most Important Decision of Your Life is a non-fiction, self-help book written by Richard Florida. The book advances Florida's previous work on the locational choices of people and businesses, invoking elements of environmental psychology by assigning psychological profiles to urban regions according to assumptions around the dominant personality traits of the people who live there.

Who's Your City? is Florida's forth book building on the concept of a creative class, which he had initially explored in his 2002 book The Rise of the Creative Class.

Some critics questioned the assumption that the target audience, those easily able to move, would consult the book for advice on moving, but also found the book provides a valuable insight into the impacts of locational choices on the urbanized world.

== Background ==
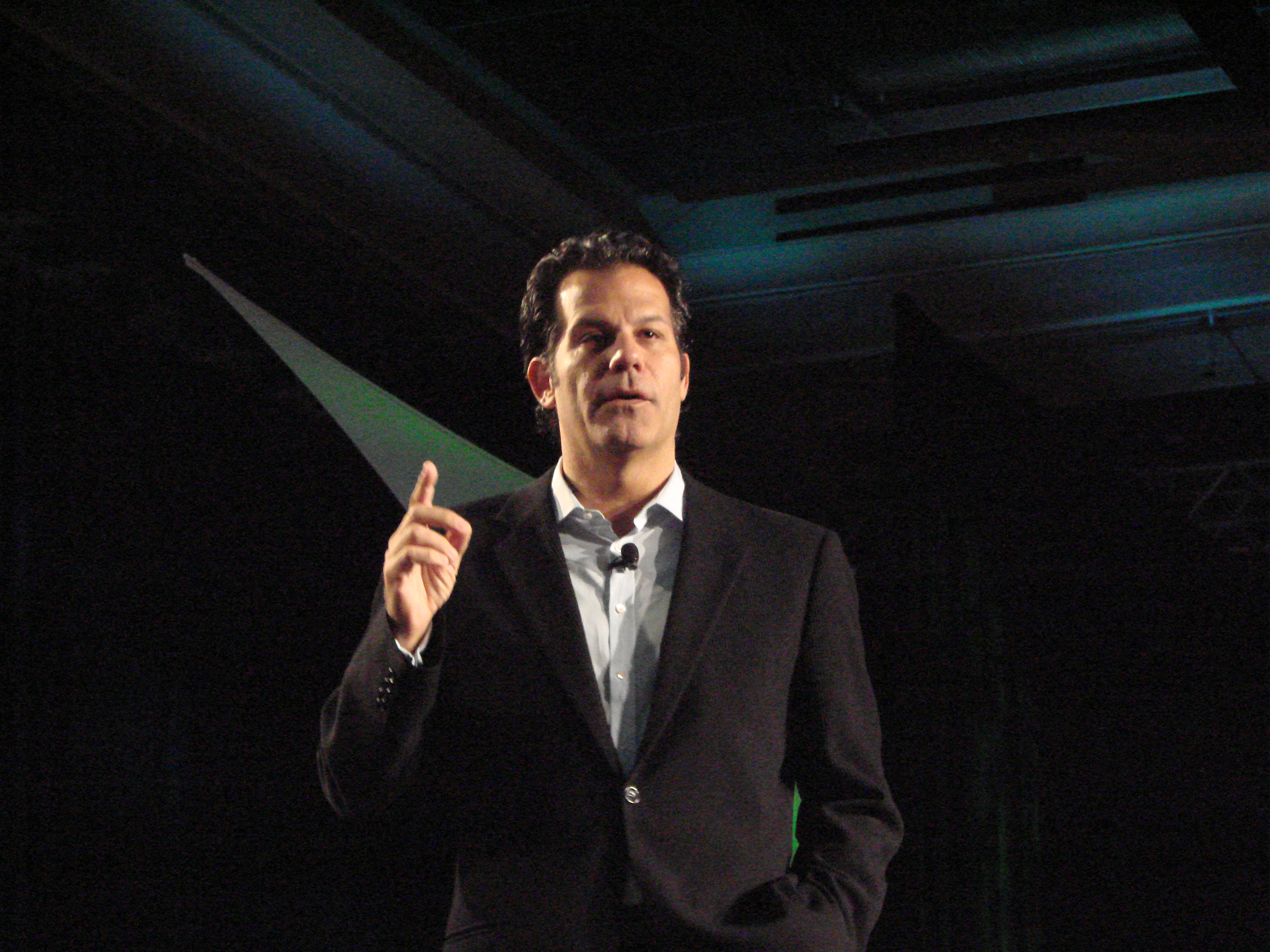
Richard Florida, author of Who's Your City?

Economic geographer Richard Florida came to prominence when he popularized the concept of a creative class, or a subset of individuals whose work involves creativity and innovation. Florida's previous three books, The Rise of the Creative Class (2002), Cities and the Creative Class (2005), and The Flight of the Creative Class (2005), link the creative class with wealth generation and argue that the individuals in the creative class choose to locate in places with strong cultural and recreational activities, as well as an interesting nightlife. Cities that have offered those activities have attracted innovative people, and despite high land and labor costs, businesses have chosen to re-locate to those areas in order to access them. With the success of his creative class theories, Florida founded a consulting firm, called the Creative Class Group, to advise local governments and other organizations about how to attract creative and innovative people. Florida, a professor at Carnegie Mellon University's Heinz College in Pittsburgh until 2005, wrote his next book, Who's Your City?, after moving to George Mason University's School of Public Policy. By the time he agreed to move to the University of Toronto he was deemed an "academic pop star". Upon his arrival, he was personally greeted by the mayor of Toronto and the premier of Ontario. Articles in the National Post and Toronto Star heralded his move, an article appeared in the magazine Style at Home featuring his new house, and he was given a regular column in The Globe and Mail.

== Synopsis ==
=== Part 1: Why Place Matters ===
The thing to remember is that when it comes to place, like most other important things in life, we can't have it all. There are real tradeoffs to be made. Many people who move for their careers will give up the joy of being near family and lifelong friends. Those of us who choose to stay close to family and friends may give up economic opportunity.

— Florida, Who's Your City?, page 7.

Who's Your City? is divided into four parts with a total of 16 chapters. The first part presents data that suggests the world's population and economy are becoming increasingly geographically concentrated into few mega-regions, such as BosWash and the San Francisco Bay Area. Thomas Friedman's Flat World Theory, or his assertion that distance and place is becoming irrelevant, is countered by Florida with maps of population growth, economic activity, innovation (as demonstrated by patent registration), and scientific discovery (as demonstrated by residence of the most heavily cited scientists). Florida's maps show "spiky" concentrations in these mega-regions, although each region does not necessarily rank high in each category. For example, the Taiheiyō Belt ranks high in innovation but low in scientific discovery, and Indian and Pakistani cities show high population concentrations but low economic activity. Florida explains the existence of these geographical spikes by insisting that talented individuals tend to cluster to one another, creating a (non-linear) multiplier effect that attracts additional talented individuals to that geographical area.

=== Part 2: The Wealth of Place ===
The second part of the book presents evidence that globalization is creating a new class divide: those who are able to move to a different community to take advantage of opportunity and those who are rooted. This mobile class of people are differentiating urban areas in terms of values, culture, economic specialization, and other factors, and businesses are following the most talented people to these cities despite high land prices and labor costs. Florida also insists that a disproportionate amount of wealth is being generated in those cities which have been successful in attracting the creative class. Finally, globalization has reduced the importance of resource extraction and manufacturing in the economy and increased the importance of fields in which the creative class participate.

=== Part III: The Geography of Happiness ===
The third part of Who's Your City? examines the role of "where someone lives" as a factor of happiness. Florida's "Place and Happiness Survey", which he conducted with The Gallup Organization, shows that higher incomes and levels of education produces more community satisfaction, married people tend to be more satisfied with their community than singles, as older people as compared to younger people. In addition, renters are slightly more satisfied with their living arrangements than home owners, and people are generally satisfied with where they live.

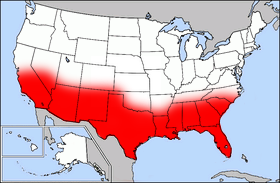
The Sunbelt region of the United States. Florida states that people with certain personality traits are attracted to the eastern part of this region.

Adding psychological profiles to his previous work, Florida was able to find strong connections between the Big Five personality traits and regions in the United States. For example, neuroticism is concentrated in the New York metropolitan area and the ChiPitts area, agreeableness and conscientiousness in the eastern Sunbelt area, extraversion in the Chicago metropolitan area, the St. Louis/Nashville/Atlanta area, and the South Florida area. Openness seems to be concentrated in the BosWash and the San Francisco Bay Area. Florida explains the results by linking the dominant forms of employment in the areas with the personality traits: manufacturing regions require people who are agreeable (i.e., they follow rules) and conscientious (they work with dangerous machinery), areas with high immigrant populations require that their residents exhibit openness, and management and sales-related jobs need workers with extroversion. Florida was also able to find that his "Gay and Bohemian Index", which connects gay and artistic communities to high growth and wealth generation areas, is a proxy for regions with large concentrations of the openness personality trait.

=== Part IV: Where We Live Now ===
The final part of the book suggests that most people have three significant moves: when leaving their parents' home, when starting a family, and when retiring (or when their own adult children move out). When young people leave their home (or when they complete college), they tend to locate to areas that offer attractive job markets, cultural or recreational amenities, and rank high in quality of life factors. When they get married or have children, people choose areas that are perceived as safe and family-friendly. Florida suggests using a "Trick-or-Treater Index" to gauge if parents feel safe allowing their children to go door-to-door on Halloween. He also cites Catherine Austin Fitts' "Popsicle Index", which gauges how far are parents willing to allow their children to walk to buy a treat. Once retired, or when their adult children move away, people tend to gravitate towards similar areas as young people, if it is close to their grandchildren, but in quieter neighborhoods that provide opportunities for hobbies or for a second career.

== Style ==
Who's Your City? was intended to be a self-help book, based on scholarly research and an academic theory, that provided a reader the mental framework necessary to match their personality and life situation with the optimum city to reside. Florida drew upon his past research on the geographical aspects of wealth generation and locational decisions of members of the creative class, as well as theories and opinions of other academics, like Jane Jacobs, and even those who have been critical of Florida's work, like Tim Harford. New research included a psychological aspect to his theory. Maps, graphs, tables, and indices illustrate the text. The book has been described as having a "lighthearted tone...[that] doesn't always work", "earnest...[with] forced exuberance", and wandering from a broad "discussion of the world economy to home-buying advice". Doron Taussig of Washington Monthly described the book as a hybrid between "academic form" and "professional-advice-giving". Several reviewers noted that while a popular audience is the target, the book is also of interest to professionals or students of the topic.

== Publication ==
Who's Your City? was published as a hardcover in March 2008 by Basic Books in the United States and Random House Canada in Canada. A year later, the trade paperback version was published in the United States. After Canadian reviewers commented on the US-focus of the book, a revised Canadian version, with some studies and maps expanded to include Canada, was published by Vintage Canada as a trade paperback. An international version was published overseas. Excerpts were published in The Globe and Mail newspaper and Fast Company magazine.

== Reception ==
While critics recognize the value in Florida's work, many found the premise behind Who's Your City? flawed. The reviewer for Salon.com wrote it was questionable that "anyone, least of all a member of the creative class, would need such a self-help book. ... Ambitious people already have a clear sense of where they need to be, and wannabes know but can't get off their rusty dusties and go".

Awkwardly straddling two universes, the academic and the self-help, Who's Your City? fails to fully satisfy on either front. But as in his other books, Florida simplifies and broadens the conversation, deftly mixing disparate ingredients from economics, urban studies, demographics and sociology into one easily digestible narrative; his work is valuable—and duly famous—for making otherwise arcane topics accessible to the everyman.

— Edward Featherstone, The Next American City

Several critics noted that Florida sounded too eager to coin terms and that some of the pop cultural references and anecdotes were awkward. Environmental psychologist Michael Dudley pointed out copy-editing errors such as misspellings, and complained that Florida ignored existing literature on the topic of the connections between personalities and places. Likewise, Tom Hutton in the journal Economic Geography noted the absence of influential academics Allen Scott and Peter Hall in the text. The reviewer in The Chronicle of Higher Education found the chapter that examined the Big Five personality traits to be the best part of the book. In The Globe and Mail, reviewer Joe Berridge wrote, "Like all self-help books, it suffers from the assertive blandness of soft psychologizing", but called Who's Your City? an "informative, insightful, imaginative book". Reviewer Nathan Glazer in The New Republic commented on the inappropriate urban area conglomerations like Delhi–Lahore, and geographical scales such as metropolitan areas. Steve Sailer of The American Conservative wrote a negative review and called Florida's conclusions "professionally cautious" so that they would not harm his consulting career. The review in the Library Journal recommended the book for all libraries and stated that "Although the text is occasionally overloaded with trendy demographic jargon, this thought-provoking and seminal work will surely be studied, not only by scholars but...by consumers pondering a move".

== Notes ==
- ^1Florida refers the reader to whosyourcity.com to use a "location calculator" designed for this purpose of helping match personality to locations.
- ^2Florida refers to the reader to a Place Finder chart in Appendix E to assist with this information gathering.
