= The Great Reset (book) =

2010 book by Richard Florida

The Great Reset: How New Ways of Living and Working Drive Post-Crash Prosperity
- Author: Richard Florida
- Language: English
- Subject: Urban development, economic history, predictions
- Publication date: April 2010
- ISBN: 9780061937194
- OCLC: 649804937

The Great Reset: How New Ways of Living and Working Drive Post-Crash Prosperity is a book published in April 2010 by Richard Florida, a professor at the University of Toronto's Rotman School of Management. The book puts into context Florida's urban development theories and the 2008 financial crisis to describe the future of cities. The Great Reset examines the economic incentives which have driven American society in the past. Florida compares the recession to two similar periods in recent history, the 1870s, and the 1930s. The book is divided into three parts such as how past resets have shaped development, how different cities are positioned, and the trends that may emerge from the reset.

== Part 1: Past as Prologue ==
Florida claims the 1870s reset best mirrors the American economic situation in the 2010s. The 1870s changed the organization of production, creating the American system of manufacturing, which paved the way for unprecedented growth and innovation. During the first great reset, there was a mass migration of people from the countryside to urban areas and significant development of new transportation structures.

The second great reset laid our current foundation. Florida cites historian Alexander Field, calling the Great Depression of the 1930s, the "most technologically progressive" time of the 20th century.

== Reaction ==
Posts to a National Post blog criticized Florida for taking an overly academic and elitist point of view. Jonathan Kay said that he overstates the size and potential impact of the creative class, neglecting many economic and social realities. According to the blog, Florida ignores many factors that people consider when they are choosing a place to live.

== See also ==
- Creative class
- Jane Jacobs
