= Cool Cities Initiative =

Cool Cities Initiative began as an initiative started by Michigan Governor Jennifer Granholm to spur growth and investment in Midwestern cities. The Initiative was proposed in 2003 in response to the brain drain of students attending college in Michigan and then seeking employment out of the state.

The Cool Cities Initiative was inspired by Dr. Richard Florida's 2002 book The Rise of the Creative Class.

Funded Projects:

Cool Cities funded $1.9 million dollars in catalysts grants in Michigan

The Stadium District, immediately south of Oldsmobile Park in Lansing, was redeveloped using a grant from the Cool Cities project.
