= Industrial district =

Aspects of the industrial organisation of nations

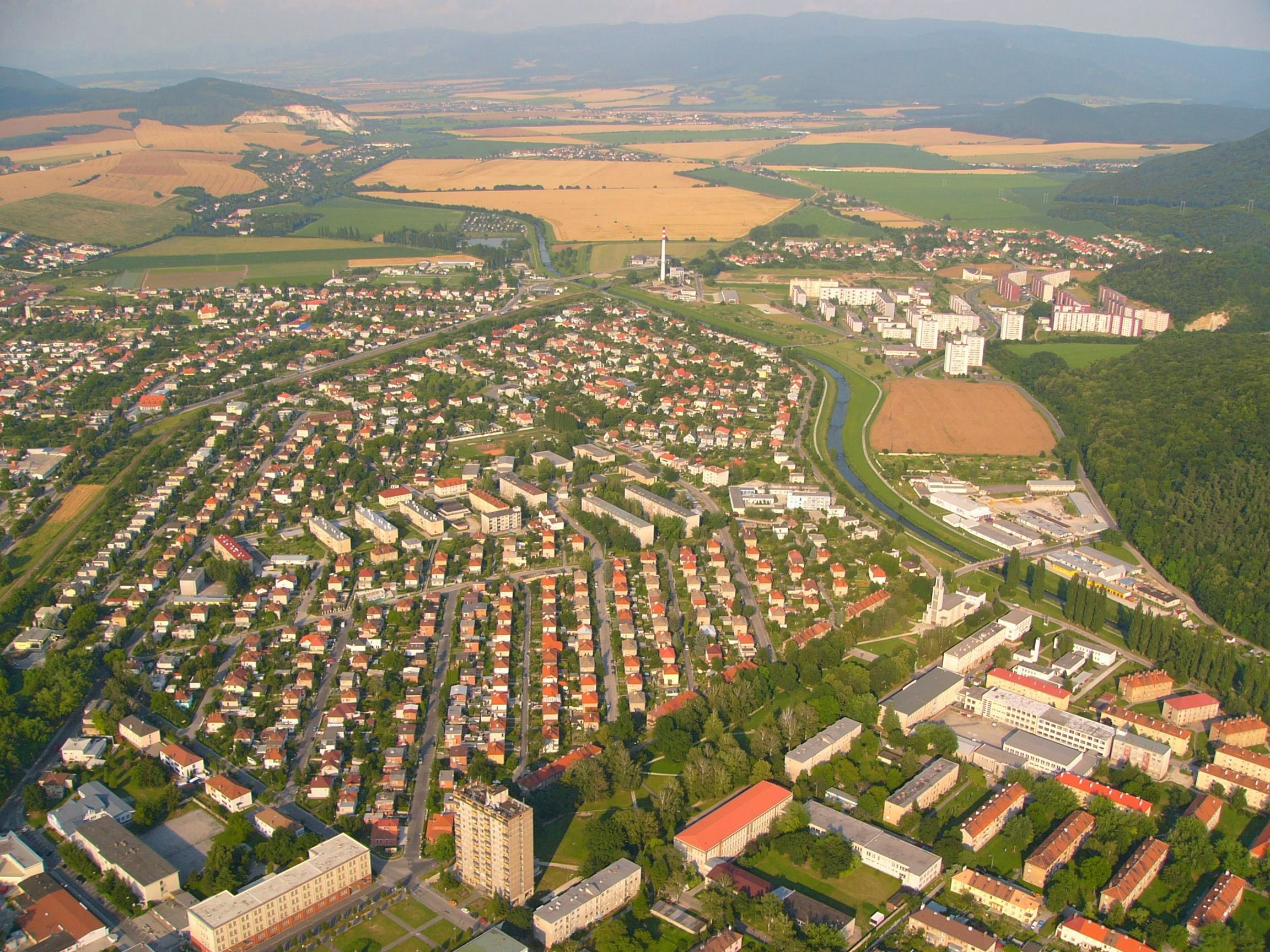
Partizánske in Slovakia – an example of a typical planned industrial city founded in 1938 together with a shoemaking factory in which practically all adult inhabitants of the city were employed.

Industrial district (ID) is a place where workers and firms specialized in a main industry and auxiliary industries live and work. The concept was initially used by Alfred Marshall to describe some aspects of the industrial organization of nations. At the end of the 1990s the industrial districts in developed or developing countries had gained recognized attention in international debates on industrialisation and policies of regional development.

== History of the term ==
Industrial district of Perm

The term was used the first time by Alfred Marshall in The Principles of Economics (1890, 1922) and in his Industry and Trade Marshall talks of a.... "thickly peopled industrial district".

The term was also used in political struggle. The 1917 handbook of the Industrial Workers of the World states:-

"In order that every given industrial district shall have complete industrial solidarity among the workers in all industries as well as among the workers of each an INDUSTRIAL DISTRICT COUNCIL is formed ..."

The term also appears in English literature. For instance, in a short story of 1920 by D. H. Lawrence, You Touched Me (aka 'Hadrian'):-

"Matilda and Emmie were already old maids. In a thorough industrial district, it is not easy for the girls who have expectations above the common to find husbands. The ugly industrial town was full of men, young men who were ready to marry. But they were all colliers or pottery-hands, mere workmen."

The strong specialisation of the workers and an appropriate support of public goods and institutions are supported by an "Industrial Atmosphere" related to a locally developing division of labour. Competences and knowledge are shared in informal way with processes of learning by doing and learning by using, and this promotes innovation over time. Local firms, families and civic organisations are connected by way of both market mechanisms and non-market mechanisms, like trust within bilateral or team exchanges, and collective action supporting the availability of local industrial, social and environmental infrastructure. Also, the notion that firms located in geographical proximity benefit from agglomeration effects in having a common or collective infrastructure is frequently mentioned as one of the main bases in the industrial district literature.

== Recent evolution of the use of the term ==
Within the study of economics, the term has evolved. Giacomo Becattini rediscovered the concept to describe the Italian industrial configuration of the middle of the 20th century. Since the 1980s, the dynamic industrial development in NEC (North, East and Centre) of Italy, where after the Second World War geographical concentration of specialised small and medium-sized enterprises (SME) raised up, led to an increasing attention to the Marshall' seminal works. A growing literature with an accompanying cloud of definitions of what is meant as an industrial district characterised the international debate, e.g. Cluster. Industrial districts in Italy have a coherent location and a narrow specialisation profile, e.g. Prato in woollen fabric, Sassuolo in ceramic tiles or Brenta in ladies' footwear.

The success of SME-based Italian districts in the last century and the alternate fortunes of the current ones led to investigate more thoroughly some related aspects. The general characteristics of the ID are consistent with gradual change supported by processes of innovation from below, or decentralized industrial creativity. However, the globalisation processes asked non-gradual changes to the historical IDs and technical and organisational difficulties could hit them.

In the Industry 4.0 era, the specialised capabilities of these areas seem to have the possibility to encourage the emergence of the New Artisans, Maker in the context of adapted models like the "ID mark 3.0".

== See also ==
- Company town
- Creative city
- Industrial park
- Mega-Site
- Mill town
