= Industrial park =

Area for development of industry

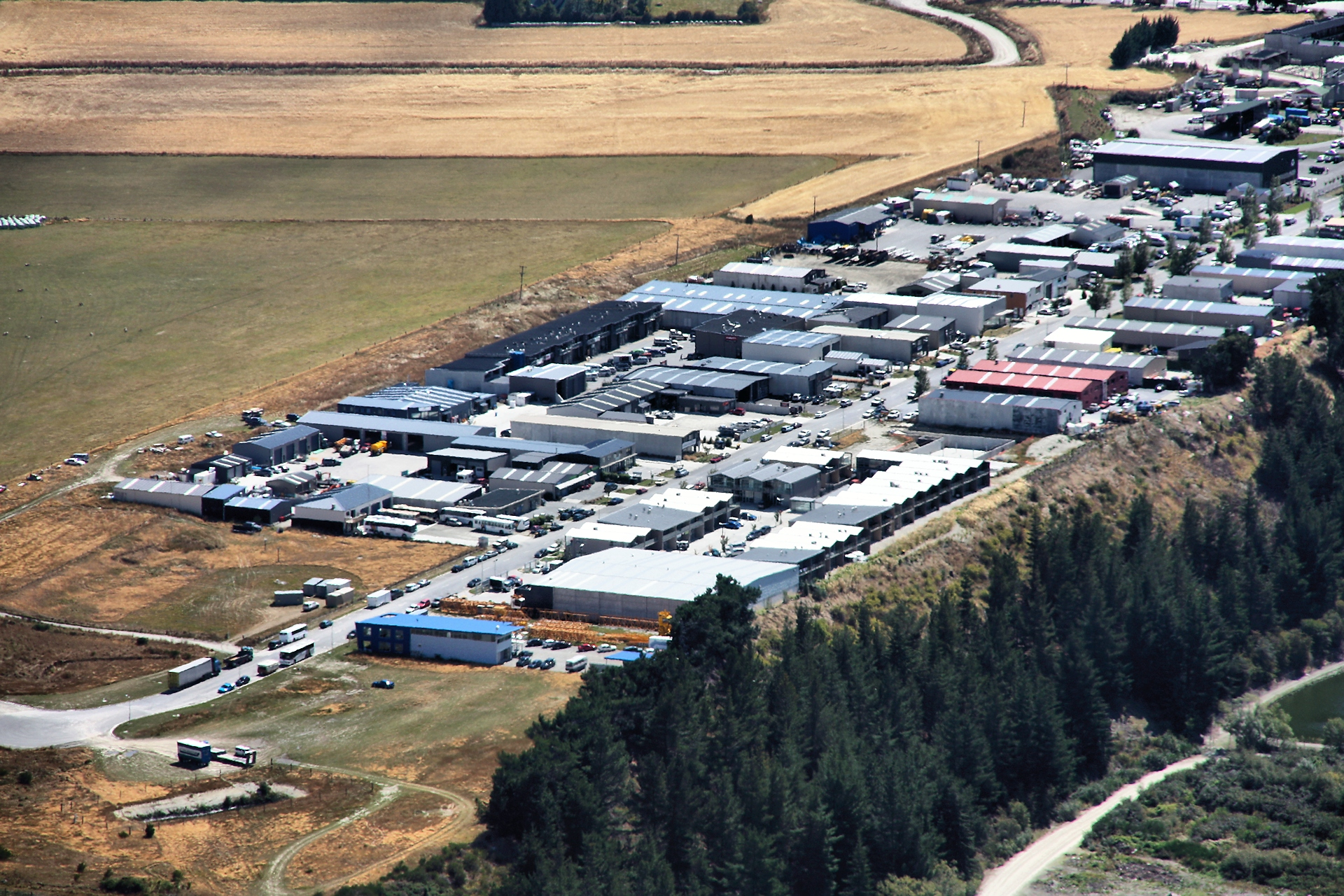
An industrial park with factories in Queenstown, New Zealand

An industrial park, also known as industrial estate or trading estate, is an area zoned and planned for the purpose of industrial development. An industrial park can be thought of as a more heavyweight version of a business park or office park, which has offices and light industry, rather than heavy industry.

== Benefits ==
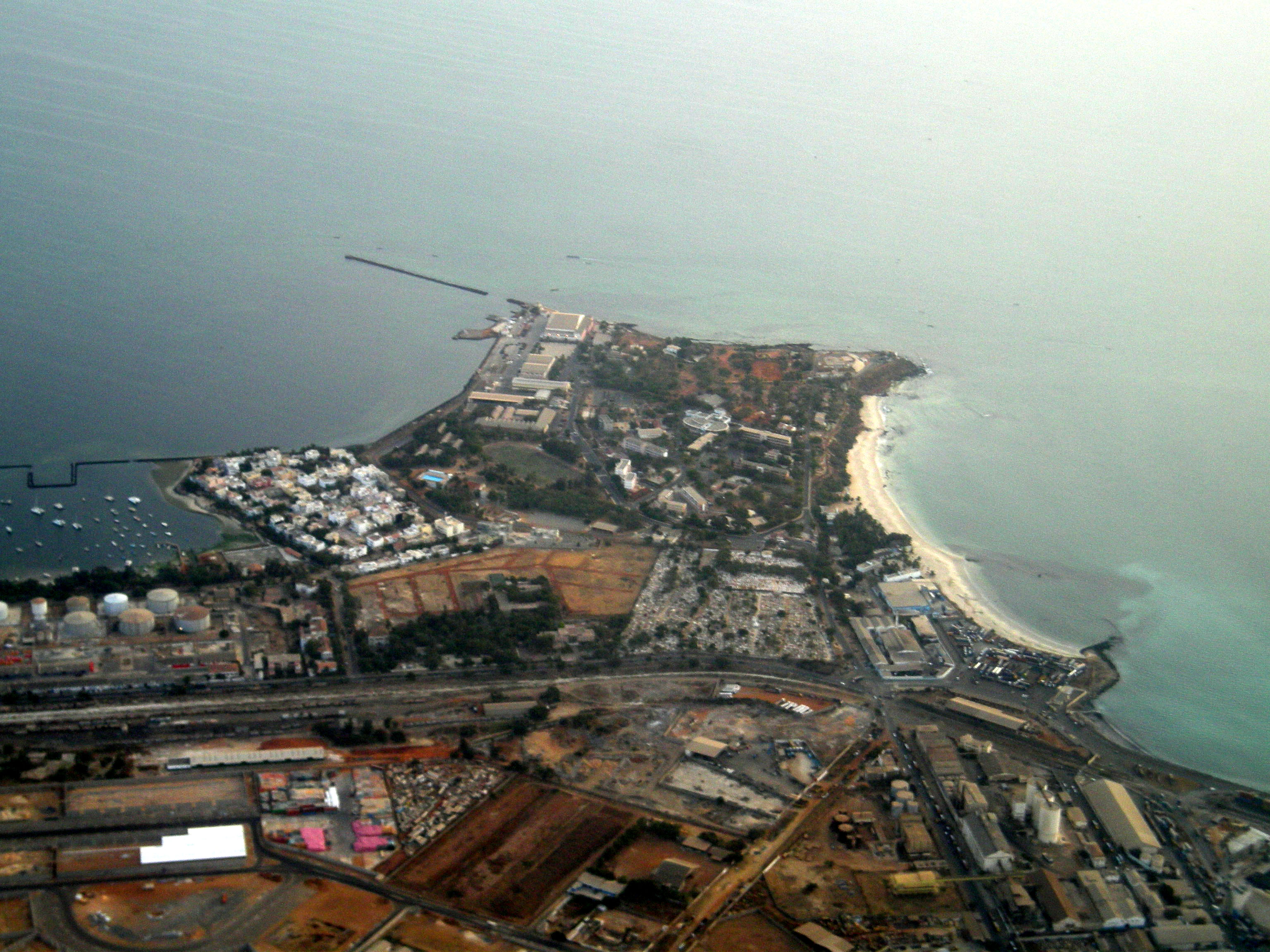
The industrial zone in Dakar, Senegal

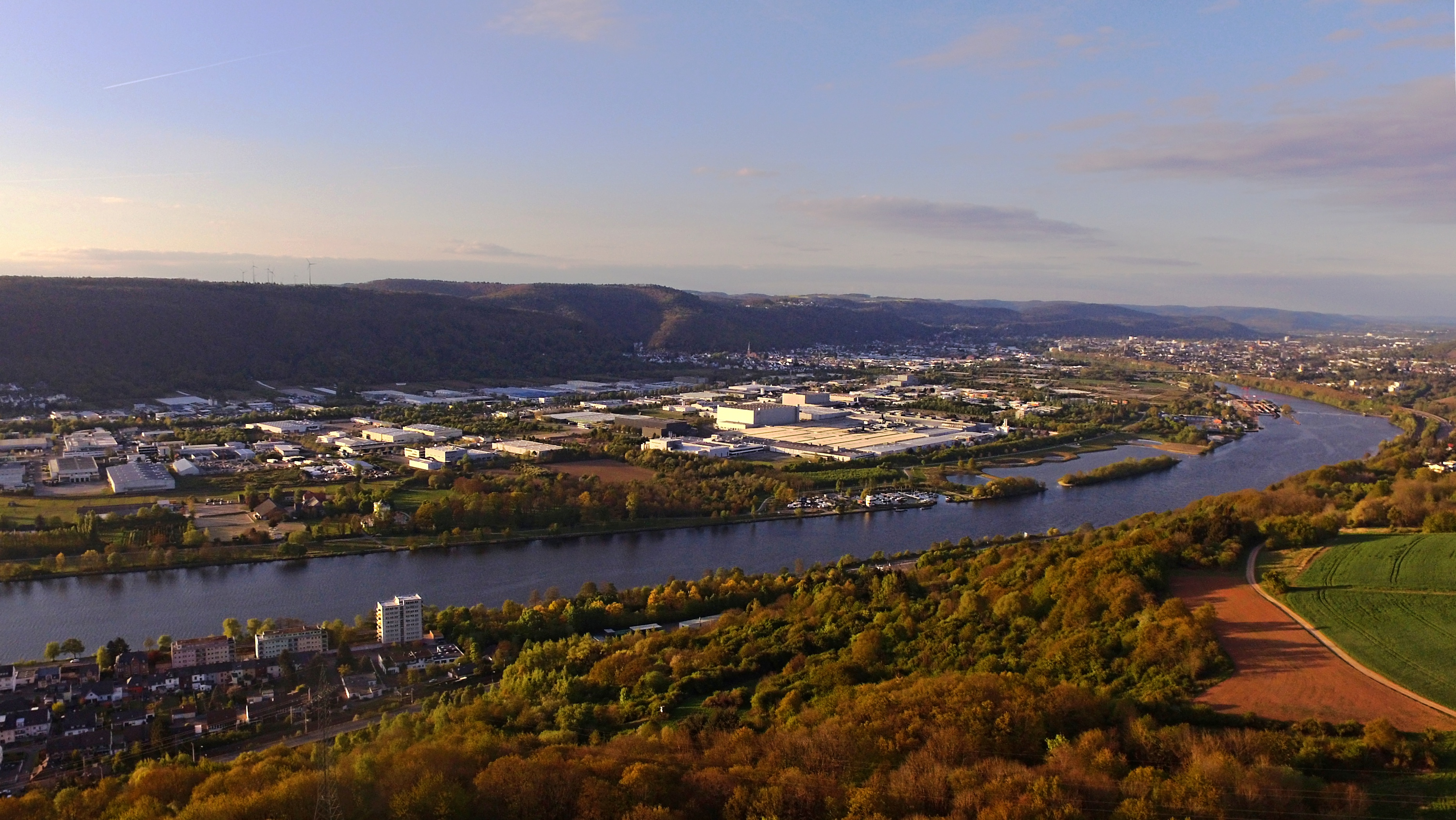
The industrial zone in Trier, Germany

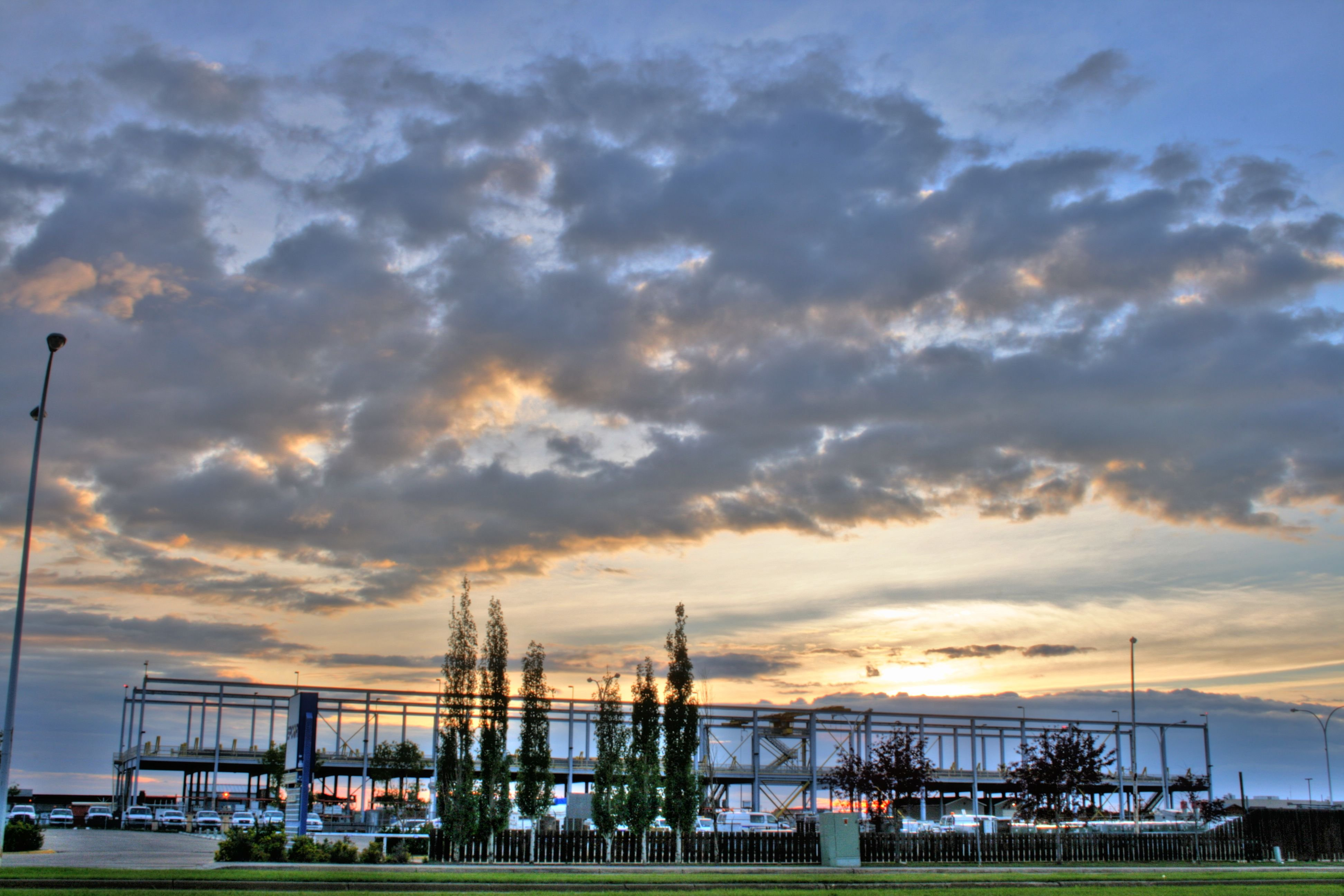
Part of the municipal airport industrial complex in Edmonton, Canada

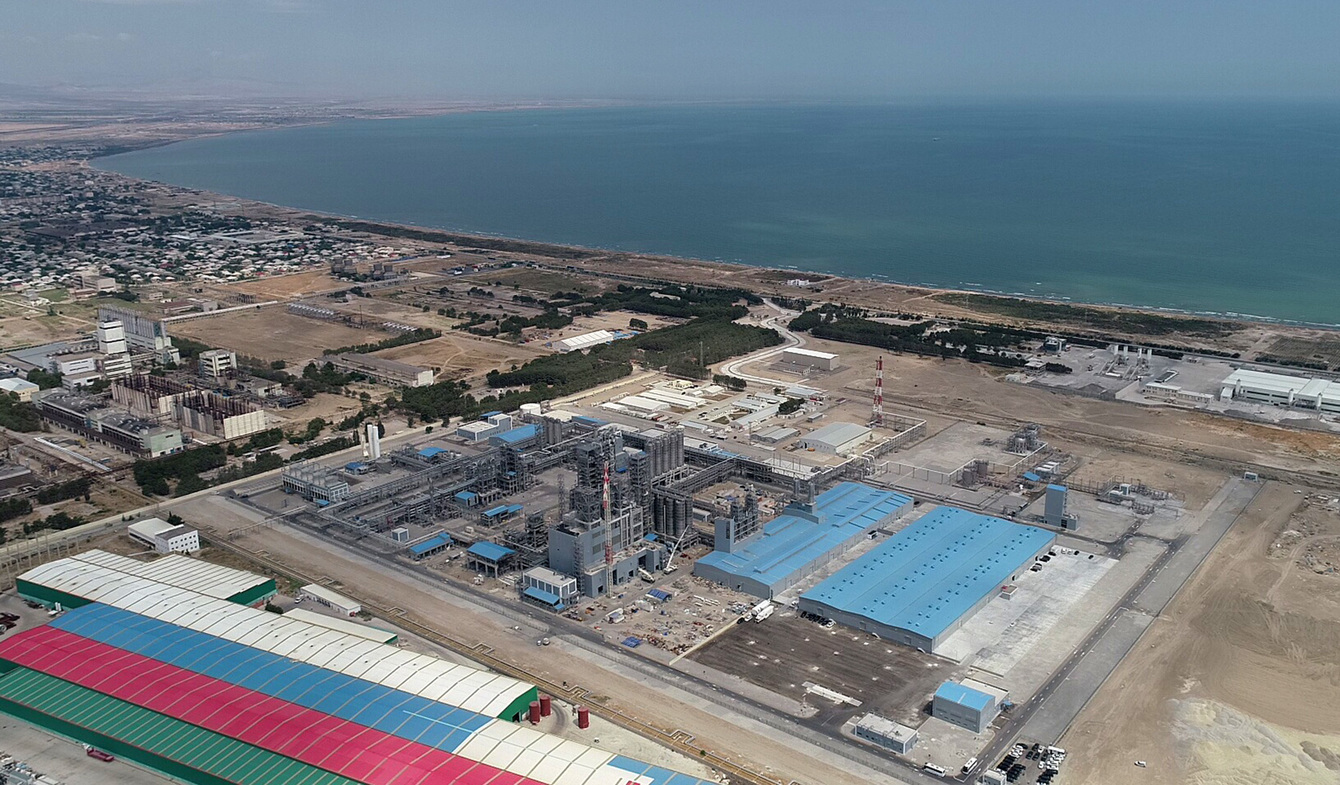
Sumgayit Chemical Industrial Park under SOCAR Polymer, Azerbaijan

Industrial parks are usually located on the edges of, or outside, the main residential area of a city, and are normally provided with good transportation access, including road and rail. One such example is the large number of industrial estates located along the River Thames in the Thames Gateway area of London. Industrial parks are usually located close to transport facilities, especially where more than one transport modes coincide, including highways, railroads, airports and ports. Another common feature of a North American industrial park is a water tower, which helps to hold enough water to meet the park's demands and for firefighting purposes, and also advertises the industrial park and locality, as usually the community's name and logo are painted onto its surface.

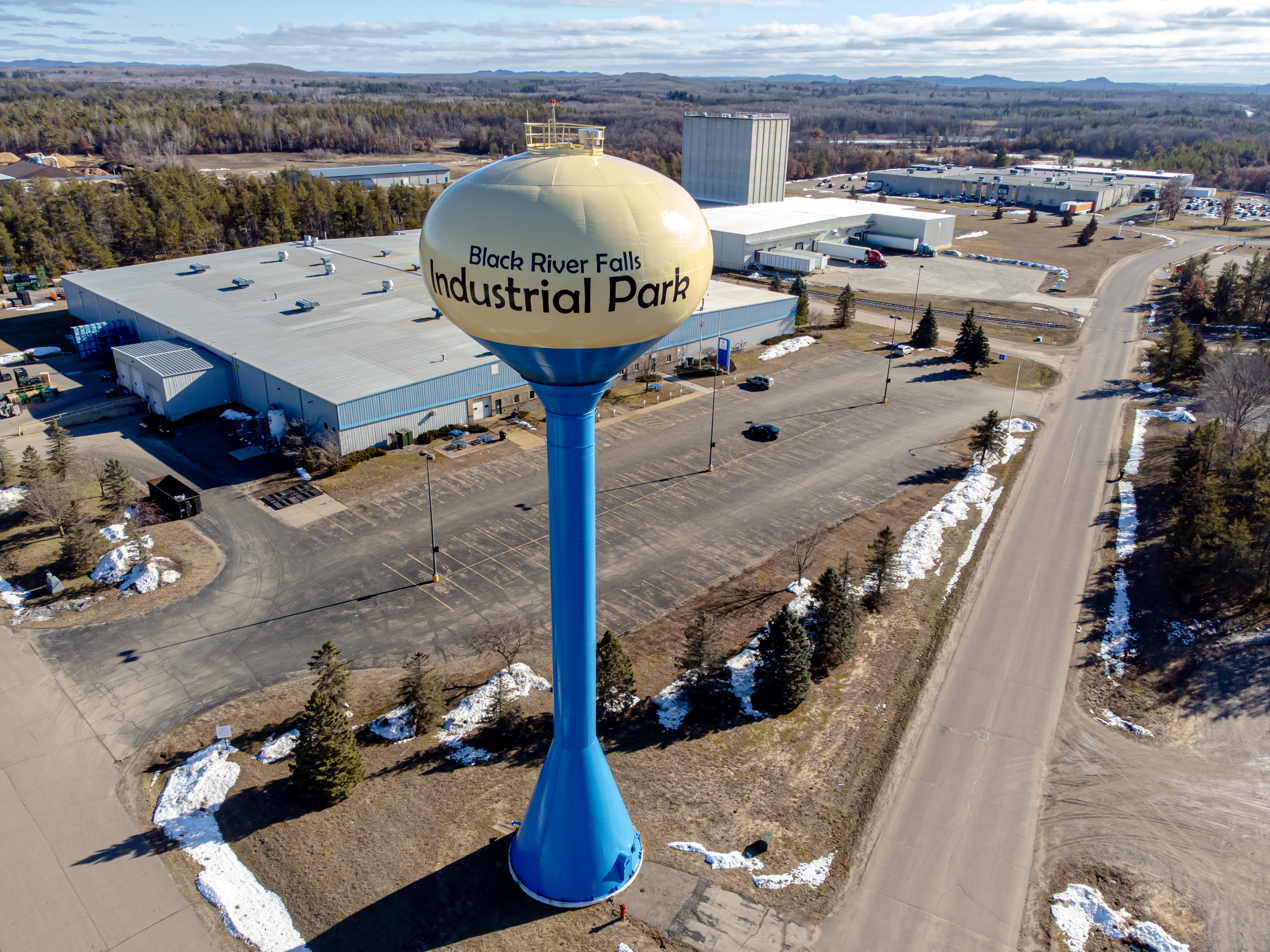
Black River Falls industrial park water tower See also: Water tower cellular

This idea of setting land aside through this type of zoning has several purposes:

- By concentrating dedicated infrastructure in a delimited area, to reduce the per-business cost of that infrastructure. Such infrastructure includes roadways, railroad sidings, ports, high-power electric supplies (often including three-phase electric power), high-end communications cables, large-volume water supplies, and high-volume gas lines.
- To attract new business by providing an integrated infrastructure in one location.
- Eligibility of Industrial Parks for benefits.
- To set apart industrial uses from urban areas to try to reduce the environmental and social impact of the industrial uses.
- To provide for localized environmental controls that are specific to the needs of an industrial area.

== Benchmarking ==
Benchmarking helps to rank industrial parks based on various criteria, including performance, investment, environmental protection, social responsibility, and governance (ESG). For the manufacturing companies located in industrial parks, the performance of industrial park operators is important, as the costs for infrastructure and services charged by the industrial park operator is a serious factor for the competitiveness of the manufacturing companies.

== Criticism ==
Different industrial parks fulfill these criteria to differing degrees. Many small communities have established industrial parks with only access to a nearby highway, and with only the basic utilities and roadways. Public transportation options may be limited or non-existent.

Industrial parks in developing countries such as India face a myriad of additional difficulties. This includes the availability of a skilled workforce and the clustering together of radically different industrial sectors (pharmaceuticals and heavy engineering, for example), which often leads to unfavorable outcomes for quality centered industries.

== Variations ==
An industrial park specializing in biotechnology is called a biotechnology industrial park. It may also be known as a bio-industrial park or eco-industrial cluster.

Flatted factories exist in cities like Singapore and Hong Kong, where land is scarce. These are typically similar to flats, but house individual industries instead. Flatted factories have cargo lifts and some have roads that serve each level, providing access to each factory lot.

The canton of Geneva, Switzerland, is also encouraging the densification of industrial areas and their transformation into mixed-use zones due to a lack of land reserves. These zones house some businesses in industrial buildings operated by real estate companies, which can generate revenue by leasing ground-floor spaces to service providers catering to workers in the zone (shops, fitness centers, restaurants, etc.).

== See also ==
- Cyberpark
- Eco-industrial park
- Energy park
- Free trade zone
- Industrial district
- Industrial railway
- Megasite
- Mill town
