= Business park =

Area of land in which many office buildings are grouped together

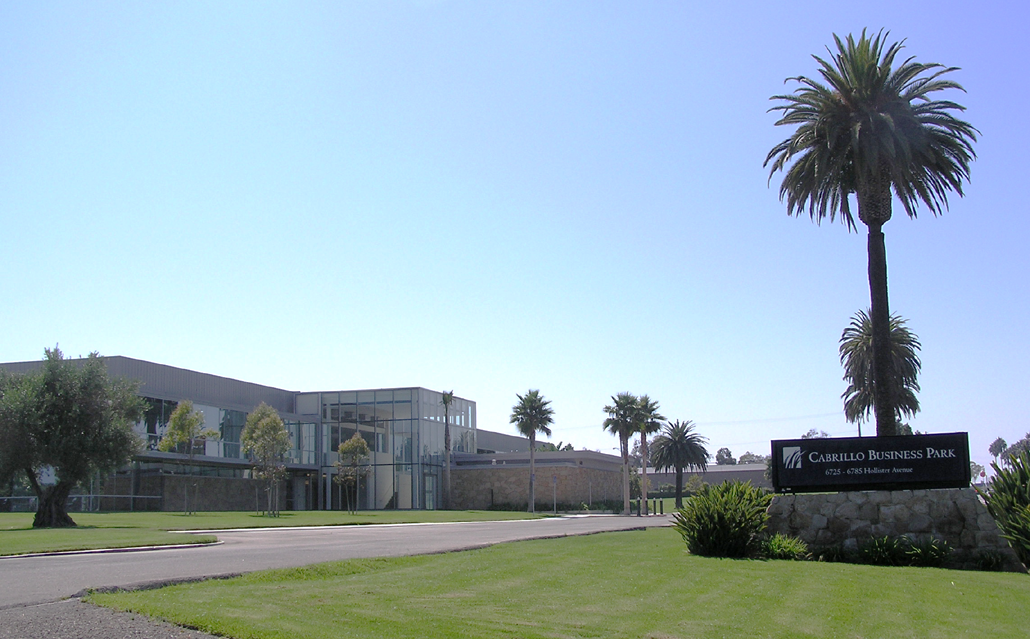
An office park in Santa Barbara County, California, United States

A business park or office park is a designated area of land in which many office buildings are grouped together. These types of developments are often located in suburban areas where land and building costs are more affordable, and are typically situated near major highways, roads, or train stations for easy access.

== Criticism ==
While business parks can provide many benefits, such as providing employment opportunities and boosting the local economy, they can also have negative impacts on surrounding areas and communities. The impact of business parks on surrounding areas and communities has been criticized:

- Large gaps between urbanized zones, increasing the suburban sprawl.
- The appearance of the buildings.
- Obsolescence, vacancy, and disrepair.

To mitigate these negative effects, businesses and developers can take steps such as incorporating green spaces and sustainable design features into the business park, as well as maintaining and updating the buildings to prevent obsolescence.

== See also ==
- Industrial park
- Knowledge spillover
- Megasite
- Office
- Science park
- Strip mall
