= Publications Distribution Cooperative =

British worker cooperative

Publications Distribution Cooperative (PDC) was set up in 1976 to distribute radical, socialist, feminist, green/ecology and community publications in Britain to the book and newsagent trade.

== History ==
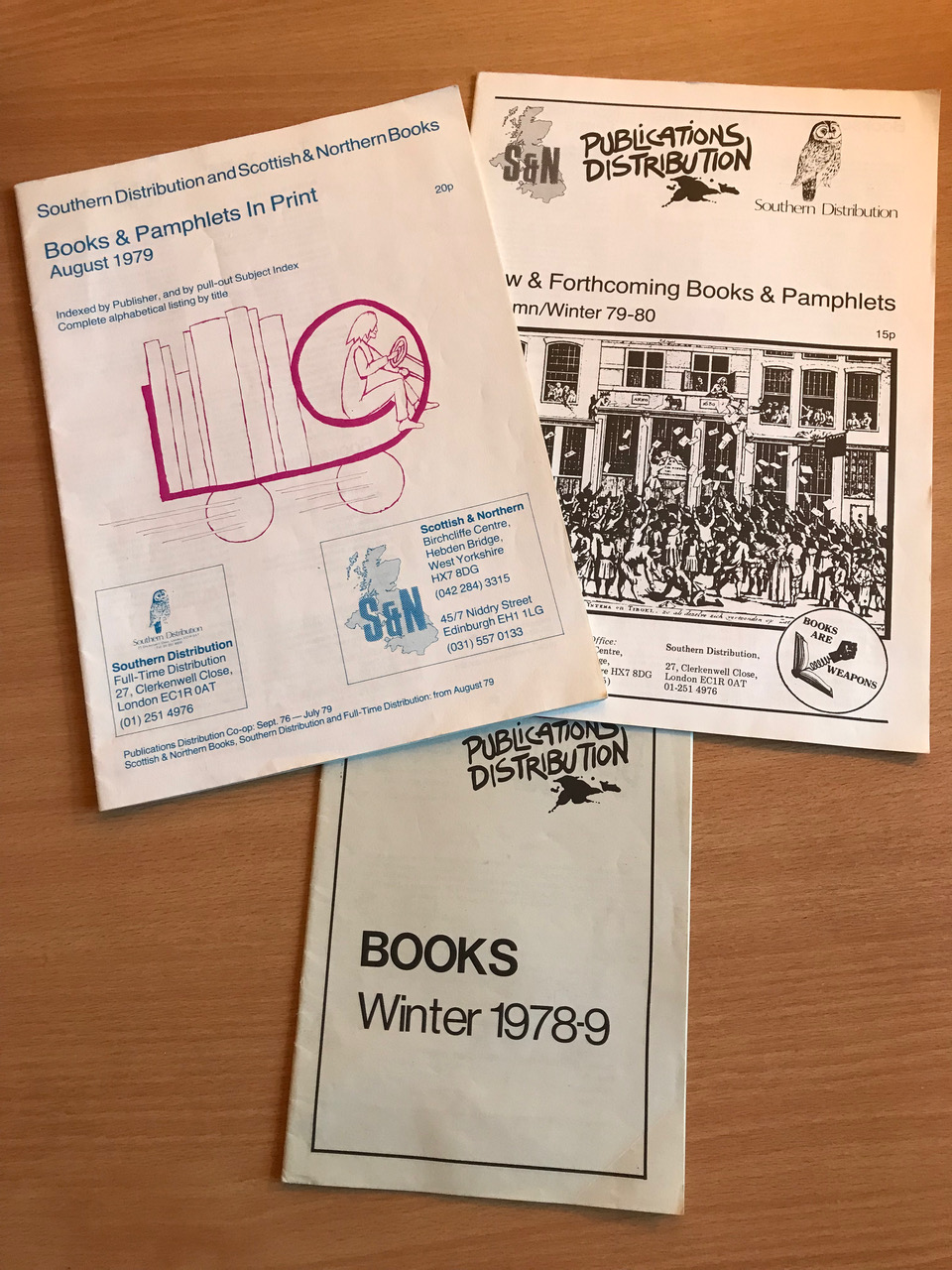
Publications Distribution Cooperative catalogues 1979

In Britain, the 1970s was a time of change in publishing and book selling with "the development in a very short period of a new and substantial radical sector and of associated retail outlets". PDC was integral to this change. The growth of new technologies in printing with offset litho, phototypesetting and more, offered cheaper, easier and more accessible ways to produce publications in a political climate eager for debate.

PDC provided the sales and distribution link between the book, magazine and pamphlet publishers and the new alternative, radical bookshops as well as the established book and newsagent trade. The existence and growth of the co-operative coincided with the launch of many new radical magazines and journals, including The Leveller, Spare Rib, Libertarian Education, Feminist Review and publishers Centerprise Books, Child Poverty Action Group, WRRC, Zed Books, and more.

This history was celebrated at an event in November 2022 at the [Barbican 'Quiet Revolutions: A Celebration of Radical Bookshops where booksellers and publishers, both contemporary — Gay's the Word, Newham Bookshop, Housmans, Roundtable Books, The Bookish Type, and Five Leaves Bookshop—and from 1970/80s—Centerprise, Freedom News, New Beacon, Sisterwrite and Silvermoon—met for a book fair and workshops/seminars.

In the mid 1970s, after a series of meetings of publishers (the Radical Publications Group—Spare Rib magazine, The Leveller, Radical Science Journal, Radical Philosophy and more).) and alternative booksellers (Ken Worpole from Centerprise Bookshop and others), in 1975/76, a feasibility study on distribution was undertaken. As a result PDC was set up in autumn 1976 by an initial group of five people supported by representatives from radical publications and booksellers.

== Structure ==
Based in Clerkenwell Workshops in London, PDC was set up as a worker co-operative that operated as a collective.. Initially constituted as a partnership, it was registered as an Industrial & Provident Society on 20 October 1977. In 1977 offices were opened in Hebden Bridge, West Yorkshire and later in Edinburgh with a co-operative member based in Birmingham who serviced outlets in the Midlands. In 1979 a decision was made to set up a parallel co-operative, Scottish and Northern Books (S&N), based in Manchester and Edinburgh, to enable local staff to make decisions relevant to their work and the markets they served. S&N was registered as an Industrial & Provident Society on 5 September 1979. The original London-based PDC divided into two groups, Full Time Distribution, which would continue to distribute magazines throughout Britain, and Southern Distribution, which would sell books and pamphlets in London and the South

== Distribution ==
At that time the distribution of magazines and periodicals through newsagents was controlled by a group of three wholesalers who would not take on radical titles. PDC worked to challenge this while building an alternative distribution network. The needs of the magazines, especially monthly publications with a growing audience like Spare Rib and The Leveller, demanded a fortnightly distribution run which ensured the magazines would be delivered regularly. This aggregation of magazine and book deliveries structured the work at PDC from the outset and included use of Red Star Parcels (rail) and alternative distributors like Suma Wholefoods as well as the Royal Mail. PDC co-op members would deliver parcels, collect magazine returns and sell new titles to the bookshops on the fortnightly run. “PDC was a powerful catalyst for growth in the radical book trade, as radical bookshops, stalls, and groups running occasional events, could easily obtain a range of stock from one source, while publishers knew there would be a reliable market for their output”.

Regular collective meetings were held to discuss and decide upon new titles as a growing range of publishers applied for a distribution deal. Many of the publishers, despite their commitment, were not professionals, and without publishing experience they often needed advice and support to make their publications acceptable to the book trade. One science journalist commented: "Until recently, there was no way that an author could hope to distribute a radical pamphlet, except by taking it to bookshops himself."

As PDC established a network in bookshops, newsagents and non-traditional sales outlets and developed a regular pattern of fortnightly distribution deliveries and sales representation across the UK, and to some shops in Europe and the USA, it increased the sales of many political and alternative magazines. Previously there had been no organised means of distribution, but now publishing groups could focus on writing and production, although not all magazines were impressed by the work of PDC.

PDC established a presence in both the book and newsagent trades, distributing various radical, feminist, ecological, and left-of-centre publications. This enabled bookshops to obtain a wide range of publications from one source. “PDC was important. Without the distribution network there were many publications, newspapers, leaflets would have struggled to circulate without a dedicated distribution framework. These were the days before social media and digital communication. The rise of alternative publishing, bookselling and distribution systems were about taking control of the whole process, reducing reliance on mainstream commercial publishers.”

As PDC grew it was listed in book trade, library directories and listings. This was an important trade recognition and a link to enable wider access and distribution of the books and magazines. In a pre-internet world getting the word out on new publications was far slower and more arduous. PDC was also credited in citations in academic books and journals, another step in the acknowledgement of the role PDC played. In 1980, it was described as "the most vital internal element in the growth of the alternative book trade in Britain in the 1970s".

When PDC stopped trading at the end of 1983 it left a huge gap for publishers and bookshops.

== Finance ==
PDC was limited by a lack of business capital and was started using loans from supporters and a lot of unpaid labour. It secured crucial grant support from the Gulbenkian Foundation and the Rowntree Trust and grew to employ 15 people. In 1978/79 the wages of eleven members of the collective were paid by the Manpower Services Commission (MSC) through its Job Creation Programme. Support was not continued into a second year when Margaret Thatcher and a Conservative government were elected in May 1979.

PDC distributed a huge range of publications, supported an ever-growing market of outlets and had a significant impact on the political debates and culture of the time. Its eventual failure was a result of many factors. Providing a marketing and distribution service to so many diverse publications proved to be financially unviable. In a pre-computer world handling 300 publishers for distribution to 500 outlets was a huge task. In the end too few of the activities were financially profitable. The lack of capital investment and of business and financial skills exacerbated the problems.

== Legacy ==
PDC London continued trading until late 1983, while S&N Books in Manchester and Edinburgh continued to trade until May 1986. The experience of PDC and S&N was fundamental to the creation of two new businesses that were started after PDC ceased trading – Bookspeed in Edinburgh and Turnaround in London – both of which are still working as distributors in 2022. It has also been argued that PDC has had a long-lasting cultural and political effect in enabling the wider distribution of radical ideas and literature than would otherwise have been the case. PDC was included and was part of the discussion on the radical booktrade in the 70s/80s, and now, held at the Barbican in November 2022.

== Publications distributed by PDC and S&N ==
Magazines included: Camerawork, Community Action, The Leveller, Musics, Red Rag,, Spare Rib, and Undercurrents.

Book publishers included: Centerprise Books, Campaign for Nuclear Disarmament (CND), Child Poverty Action Group (CPAG), Federation of Worker Writers and Community Publishers, Friends of the Earth, Gay Men's Press, Interaction Inprint, Institute of Race Relations (IRR), NCCL (National Council for Civil Liberties, now Liberty), Onlywomen Press, Onyx Press, Sheba Feminist Publishers, WRRC Women’s Research and Resources Centre, Zed Books and many more.

Pamphlets were distributed from many different publishers and campaigning organisations as well as one-off campaigns. PDC and S&N both distributed thousands of copies of Protest and Survive written by E. P. Thompson and published by Bertrand Russell Peace Foundation/Spokesman Books, a critical anti-nuclear reply to Protect and Survive published by the government.

Academic journals included: Capital & Class, Feminist Review, Gay Left, Ideology and Consciousness, m/f, Race and Class, and Radical Philosophy.
