= Charles Landry =

English businessman and author

- Born: 1948 (age 77–78); United Kingdom
- Occupations: Writer, urban planner
- Writing career
- Subject: Urban planning
- Notable work: The Creative City: A Toolkit for Urban Innovators
- Movement: Comedia
- Website: charleslandry.com

Charles Landry (born July 1, 1948) is an author and international adviser on the future of cities best known for popularising the Creative City concept. His book The Creative City: A Toolkit for Urban Innovators became a movement to rethink the planning, development and management of cities.

He is credited for his attempt to rethink city making through his work on intercultural cities, the psychology of cities, the nomadic world, creative bureaucracies and the measurement of creativity in cities – the latter developed with Bilbao and now assessed through in-depth studies of 25 cities.

He invented the ‘creative bureaucracy’ concept and is president of the Creative Bureaucracy Festival in Berlin he co-founded in 2018 with Sebastian Turner.

== Early life ==
Charles Landry was born in 1948 and brought up and educated in Britain, Germany and Italy. Landry was born in London to German parents who had escaped from the Nazis. His father Harald was a philosopher and Nietzsche specialist and his mother an artist. He was educated at the Nymphenburger Gymnasium in Munich, Keele University in Staffordshire and Johns Hopkins in Bologna where he was assistant to Robert Skidelsky. His dissertation was on problems of post-industrial society.

== Career ==
Landry was assistant to Lord Kennet, a former Labour government minister, on the Europe Plus Thirty an EEC study on forecasting (1973-1974) commissioned by Ralf Dahrendorf. With colleagues he started Publications Distribution Cooperative in 1976, a company focused on distributing alternative literature and media for the then burgeoning system of non-mainstream publishers and bookshops. In parallel he was a specialist bookseller focusing on radical publications.

In 1978 he founded Comedia, a think tank, publisher and consultancy. Comedia undertook much of the early work highlighting the importance of cultural resources as well as a methodological framework and evidence for what is now known as the creative economy, formerly cultural industries. Its publishing programme provided some of the intellectual backdrop to the emergence of cultural studies, involving authors such as Dave Morley, Ken Worpole, Geoff Mulgan, Patrick Wright. The provocative What a way to run a Railroad: An Analysis of Radical Failure (1985) assessed how the high failure rate of radical projects could be understood, but in the aftermath Landry was criticized as being ‘a left wing Thatcherite’.

Throughout the 1980s and 1990s, Comedia supported a changing group of people developed projects concerned with urban life, culture and creativity and the future of cities including Franco Bianchini, Phil Wood, Sir Peter Hall, Jude Bloomfield and Naseem Khan. After producing more than 100 books Comedia publishing was sold to Routledge in 1988. Initially Comedia's publishing wing was most well known for research and projects on the future of cities. Later Comedia's research became better known with long term projects including Culture at the Crossroads, The Art of Regeneration, and Creativity at the Heart of Culture.

From the 2000s onwards his work has focused on urban ecosystems and measuring civic creativity and public innovation. The Creative Bureaucracy Festival is the main platform for these ideas

== Publications ==
- The Civic City in a Nomadic World (2017)
- The Creative Bureaucracy & its radical common sense with Margie Caust (2017)
- Psychology and the City (2017) with Chris Murray
- The Digitized City (2016)
- Cities of Ambition (2015)
- The Fragile City & the Risk Nexus (2014) with Tom Burke
- Culture & Commerce (2013)
- The Creative City Index (2013) with Jonathan Hyams
- The Sensory Landscape of Cities (2012)
- The Origins & Futures of the Creative City (2012)
- The Intercultural City: Planning for Diversity Advantage (2007) with Phil Wood
- The Art of City Making (2006)
- The Creative City: A toolkit for urban innovators (2000)
- The Creative City in Britain & Germany (1996) with Franco Bianchini & Ralph Ebert
- The Other Invisible Hand with Geoff Mulgan (1995)
- Libraries in a world of cultural change (1995) with Liz Greenhalgh & Ken Worpole
- The Creative City with Franco Bianchini (1994)
- Borrowed time? :the future of public libraries in the UK (1993)
- What a way to run a railroad: An analysis of radical failure (1985) with Dave Morley, Russell Southwood, Patrick Wright
- Here is the Other News: Challenges to the Local Commercial Press (1980) with Crispin Aubrey and Dave Morley
- Where is the Other News: The Newstrade & the Radical Press (1980)
- The Other Secret Service: Press distributors & press censorship (1980) with Liz Cooper and Dave Berry
