= Chiang Mai Creative City =

Creative city initiative in Thailand

- Company type: Organization
- Industry: Digital content, IT, software development, design, handicrafts, creative industries
- Founded: 2010
- Headquarters: North, Chiang Mai, Thailand
- Area served: Chiang Mai, Thailand, international investors and partners
- Key people: Nat Vorayos (Chairman); Martin Venzky-Stalling (Member, Advisor); Tanyanuparb Anantana (Member, Secretariat)
- Services: Investor information, capacity development, R&D, etc
- Website: creativechiangmai.com

Chiang Mai Creative City (Thai: เชียงใหม่เมืองสร้างสรรค์) is an initiative to develop Chiang Mai into a creative city. A creative city is a city where cultural and creative activities are an integral part of the city's economic and social functioning. The experience of other cities which have implemented such strategies has shown that they can be more successful (with meeting their development objectives) than cities which have not. On 31 October 2017, Chiang Mai has been designated as a UNESCO Crafts and Folk Art Creative Cities Network.

== Background ==
The Chiang Mai Creative City Development Committee was set up by the Governor of Chiang Mai and consists of members from the education, private and government sectors. The Governor of Chiang Mai Province, the president of Chiang Mai University, the president of Payap University, the president of North Chiang Mai University, and the US Consul General are advisors.

The Development Committee organised several activities such as a logo and website design competition and a seminar on how to develop a creative city with a guest speaker from Austin. One of the next events is with guest speaker from UNESCO to discuss how Chiang Mai could become a UNESCO recognised Creative City.

The objective of the Development Committee are to develop a road-map and strategy for Chiang Mai Creative City, coordinate and share information across stakeholders, coordinate and govern projects, implement and operate activities and projects, set up working committees and working teams as required.

Chiang Mai University was nominated to chair the Development Committee and to provide the secretariat and point of contact. At the present staff is allocated on a part-time and voluntary basis (by CMU).

The Development Committee is not a legal entity, but relies on its formal and informal members to support and work together. Longer-term, the Development Committee may need to institutionally developed further and become a legal entity, but is premature to conclude this now. The way of working of the Development Committee is on a consensus but also voluntary basis. This means that the Development Committee can suggest policies, projects, and activities (and if asked coordinate and govern these), but it is up to the members to implement these (and provide resources).

The initiative covers creative clusters but also other issues such as urban development, education, R&D and innovation and collaboration. Some of the involved stakeholders put emphasis on the IT, software and digital content sector - since it is an important growth sector and an enabler for other sectors. Moreover, this sector also has a high potential for generating spillover effects, creating value-added, and attracting additional investment.

Existing key sectors such as tourism (e.g. medical tourism, cultural tourism, historical tourism), handicrafts (jewellery, silverware, celadon and other forms of pottery, textile, etc.), food/agro-industry, and healthcare are also targeted and can be upgraded using new designs, processes, IT, (technology-based) innovation, and creative thinking.

== Vision and Mission ==
The time frame for Chiang Mai Creative City needs to be long-term (15–20 years). Medium-term, the vision and objectives should align with Thailand's next national social and economic development plan (2012–2016), which will have a strong emphasis on creativity, creative economy, knowledge and innovation. Creative industries comprise 13% of total GDP (2009) and the government intends to increase this to at least 20%. Chiang Mai has an opportunity to take a significant share of this growth.

== See also ==
- Chiang Mai Design Week
- Creative Economy Agency
