= Kate Hepburn =

British graphic designer and artist (1947–2024)

- Born: 11 June 1947; Blackheath, London, England
- Died: 26 July 2024 (aged 77); Royal Free Hospital, Hampstead, London, England
- Education: Royal College of Art
- Occupations: Graphic designer and artist
- Employer(s): Spare Rib; Vole; Pluto Press

Kate Hepburn (11 June 1947 – 26 July 2024) was a British graphic designer and artist. She was most known for her typography work on Spare Rib, Vole and with Pluto Press, her work as an animation assistant for the surreal comedy group Monty Python and for her designs for the rock band Pink Floyd.

== Biography ==
Hepburn was born on 11 June 1947 in Blackheath, London, England. She moved with her family to Parliament Hill after her mother Margaret Hepburn married a man who was in the Royal Air Force.

Hepburn was educated at Camden School for Girls. She took a foundation course at the Bath Academy of Art, where she developed an interest in letterforms, then studied at London’s Central School of Art and Design.

While in her first year of study at the Royal College of Art (RCA), she worked on animations for Monty Python’s Flying Circus surreal sketch comedy television series with Terry Gilliam. She designed the dust jacket smeared with dirty fingerprints for The Brand New Monty Python Bok (1973) and created typography and spoof advertisements for the book.

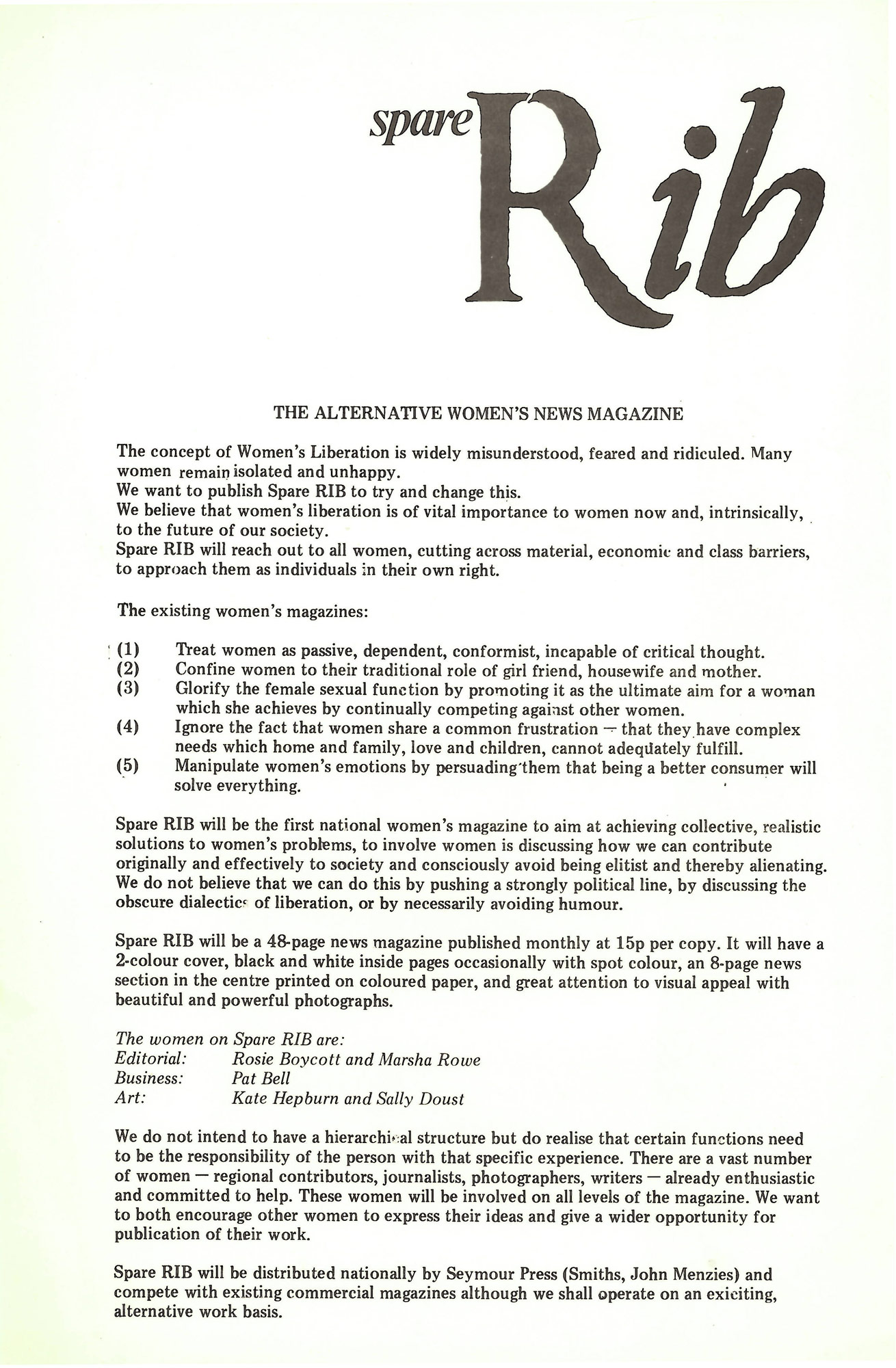
The Spare Rib manifesto, featuring the logo designed by Hepburn

In 1972, Hepburn joined the new feminist monthly magazine Spare Rib, which was founded by Rosie Boycott and Marsha Rowe. Hepburn designed the logo and masthead and Sally Doust designed the grid format. Hepburn and Doust aimed to create "a new kind of visual language that would indicate it was both a women’s magazine and a publication that challenged the status quo."

After leaving Spare Rib, Hepburn designed the cover of Frederic V. Grunfeld’s book The Hitler File (1974). From 1975, she contributed cover and book designs to the left-wing independent publisher Pluto Press, such as for Making Space: Women and the Man-Made Environment by Matrix. Hepburn also designed for environmentalist magazine Vole, literary journal Quarto and film magazine Vertigo.

Hepburn designed artwork for Jean-Michel Jarre’s 1981 tour of China, for which she won two Design and Art Direction (D&AD) awards.

Hepburn worked with the rock band Pink Floyd and was commissioned to paint a pastiche 3D version of Katsushika Hokusai's The Great Wave off Kanagawa on Nick Mason’s drum kit. The drums were displayed in an exhibition at the Victoria and Albert Museum in 2017. In 1987, Hepburn and Pearce Marchbank collaborated to design the cover of Pink Floyd member Roger Waters solo album Radio K.A.O.S., converting Waters’ name and track titles to morse code.

Towards the end of her life, Hepburn worked with the charity Age UK's Camden branch, which had been founded by her mother. Hepburn died on 26 July 2024 in Hampstead’s Royal Free Hospital, aged 77.
