= The Cultural Creatives =

2000 book by Ray & Anderson

The Cultural Creatives: How 50 Million People Are Changing the World
- Author: Paul H. Ray and Sherry Ruth Anderson
- Cover artist: Whitney Cookman
- Language: English
- Subject: Social sciences and sociology
- Publisher: Harmony Books
- Publication date: 2000
- Publication place: United States
- Media type: Print (hardcover and paperback)
- Pages: 370
- ISBN: 9780609604670

The Cultural Creatives: How 50 Million People Are Changing the World is a nonfiction social sciences and sociology book by sociologist Paul H. Ray and psychologist Sherry Ruth Anderson (born 1942). The authors introduced the term "Cultural Creatives" to describe a large segment in Western society who since about 1985 have developed beyond the standard paradigm of modernists or progressives versus traditionalists or conservatives. Ray and Anderson claim to have found 50 million adult Americans (slightly over one quarter of the adult population) can now be identified as belonging to this group. They estimated an additional 80–90 million "Cultural Creatives" exist in Europe as of 2000.

== Two types ==
Ray and Anderson divide "Cultural Creatives" into two subdivisions:

=== Core "Cultural Creatives" ===
Just under half of the CC population comprises people Ray and Anderson describe as more educated, leading-edge thinkers. This includes many writers, artists, musicians, psychotherapists, alternative health care providers and other professionals. They combine a focus on their spirituality with social activism.

== Characteristics ==
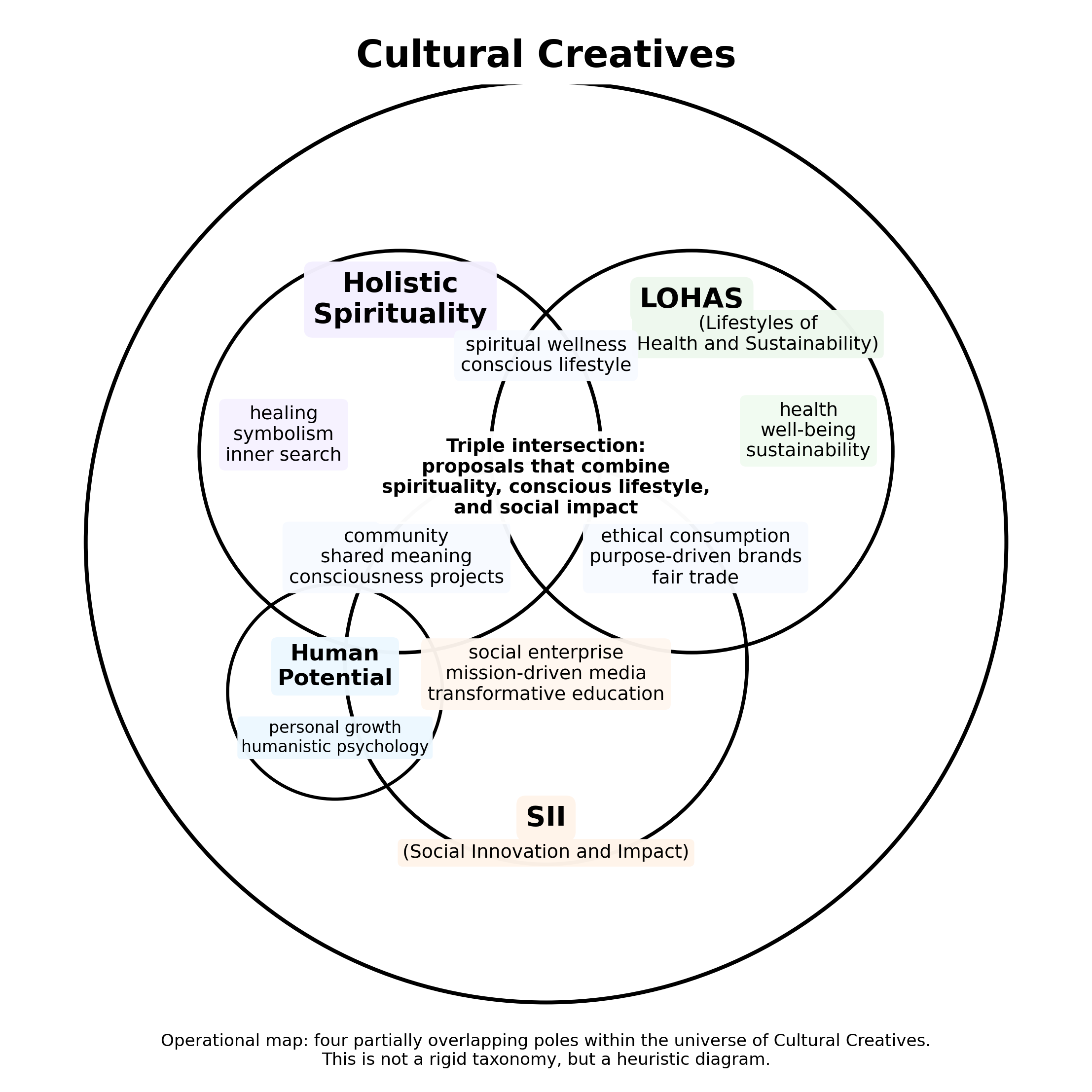
Conceptual and heuristic diagram of four partially overlapping poles within the psychographic universe of the “Cultural Creatives”

Ray and Sherry Anderson created a questionnaire to identify "Cultural Creatives" in Western society. The characteristics below were identified as qualities of a "Cultural Creative". Agreement with 10 or more indicates status as a "Cultural Creative".

- love of nature and deep caring about its preservation, and its natural balance.
- strong awareness of the planet-wide issues like climate change and poverty and a desire to see more action on them
- being active themselves
- willingness to pay higher taxes or spend more money for goods if that money went to improving the environment
- emphasize the importance of developing and maintaining relationships
- emphasize the importance of helping others and developing their unique gifts
- volunteer with one or more good causes
- intense interest in spiritual and psychological development (personal growth)
- see spirituality as an important aspect of life, but worry about religious fundamentalism
- desire equality for women and men in business, life and politics
- concern and support of the well-being of all women and children
- support spending more money on education, community development programs, and the support of a more ecologically sustainable future
- unhappy with the left and right in politics
- optimism towards the future
- involved in creating a new and better way of life
- concerned with big business and the means they use to generate profits, including destroying the environment and exploiting poorer countries
- unlikely to overspend or be heavily in debt
- dislike the emphasis of modern cultures on "making it" and "success", on consuming and making money
- like people, places and things that are different or exotic

== Values ==
Ray and Anderson assert "values are the best single predictor of real behavior". The list below outlines the values dictating a "Cultural Creative"'s behavior:

- Authenticity, actions consistent with words and beliefs
- Engaged action and whole systems learning; seeing the world as interwoven and connected
- Idealism and activism
- Globalism and ecology
- The growing cultural significance of women

Core "Cultural Creatives" also value altruism, self-actualization, and spirituality.

== In business ==
The concept of "innerpreneurs" to denote persons who create a business that focuses mainly on their own inner goals and development was first introduced by Rebecca Maddox in her 1996 book Inc. Your Dreams The "innerpreneurs" concept is also central to Ron Rentel's 2008 book Karma Queens, Geek Gods and Innerpreneurs, in which he identified the "Cultural Creative" subculture in entrepreneurship. Rentel named entrepreneurial "Cultural Creatives", "innerpreneurs". "Innerpreneurs" have the defining characteristics of an entrepreneur:

- high need for achievement
- high need for independence
- low need for conformity
- internal focus of control
- love of ambiguity
- propensity for risk-taking
- obsession with opportunity

But while entrepreneurs use their business for monetary gain, "innerpreneurs" use their business to find personal fulfillment (creatively, spiritually, emotionally) and create social change.

In 2008, there was much discussion in the Western media on the 'creative economy' and the importance of the 'creative class'. Richard Florida published a series of books on this identified 'creative class' and their upcoming economic importance. Bill Gates spoke at the World Economic Forum 2008 on the need for 'creative capitalism' as a solution to the world's problems. They theorize that being creative and inventive will be the key to business success in the 21st century and that a country's economic success will be determined by its capitalists' ability to mobilize, attract and retain human creative talent. See Douglas Rushkoff for an update on how this evolved.

== Use of the term integral ==
Ray gives the term "Integral Culture" to the growing subculture. He also refers to this as transmodernism, which he refers to as the "Cultural Creatives". They are concerned with ecological sustainability and in the case of a core group have a commitment to personal and spiritual development. These are individuals who can meld the best of traditionalism and modernism to create a new synthesis, having a cognitive style based on synthesizing varied information from many sources into a big picture. This term can also apply to integral theory, a conceptual framework expounded by Ken Wilber. Use of the term 'integral' in reference to the creative-spiritual growth and transformation of human species was first made in early 1900s by Aurobindo Ghosh, who published teachings on Integral Yoga along with Mirra Alfassa, who founded the first international community of 'Cultural Creatives' in 1968, known as Auroville.

== See also ==
- Creative class
- Conscious business
- LOHAS
