= Vole (magazine) =

UK environmental magazine

Vole was a British environmentalist magazine published between 1977 and 1980. It was founded by journalist Richard Boston, with funding from Monty Python member Terry Jones. The magazine was intended to have a more light-hearted tone than the other countryside and ecology magazines of the time. The founders' working title for the magazine (shortened when it began actual publication) was The Questing Vole, a quotation from the fictitious nature column written by William Boot, the protagonist of Evelyn Waugh's novel Scoop (1938) – "Feather-footed through the plashy fens passes the questing vole".

The magazine contributed to raising awareness of serious Green politics at a time when many people's view of the issue was coloured by the BBC sitcom The Good Life.

== Contents ==
Contributors included:

- Richard Adams
- John Arlott
- Pete Atkin, writing about DIY
- Tony Benn
- Jeremy Bugler
- John A Burton
- Catherine Caufield
- Gillian Darley, Museum Correspondent
- Paul Foot
- David Helton
- Kate Hepburn
- Richard Ingrams
- Terry Jones
- Miles Kington
- Richard Mabey
- Richard D. North
- Bryan Reading (cartoonist)
- Posy Simmonds
- Ralph Steadman
- Bill Tidy

Bryan Reading's cartoon strip "The Belchers" (commissioned by Richard Boston), featuring the bucolic adventures of metropolitan emigrants Nigel and Fiona Allbran, appeared throughout Vole's four-year lifetime.

In June 1980, the managing editor of Vole was Charles Alverson.

== Issue numbering and format ==
The numbering of the issues was somewhat irregular. From September 1977 to August 1978 issues were numbered 1 to 12 (though number 8 was misnumbered as 7, subscription copies being manually corrected). The next issue, published in October 1978, began a new volume: it was numbered Vol. 2 No. 1, and this numbering continued to Vol. 2 No. 11, dated October 1979 (but actually published in September). Volume 3 began with No. 1, dated October 1979, and continued to Vol. 3 No. 10, dated July 1980. At this point the format changed to a tabloid size for the remaining three issues of the volume, No. 11, October 1980, to No. 13, December 1980. Volume 4, nos. 1–8, retained the tabloid format, and ran from January 1981 to September 1981.

Vole's ISSN was 140-4571.
