= Spare Rib =

Former feminist magazine

- Spare Rib cover, December 1972; featuring John Cleese on the cover
- Editor: Collective from late 1973
- Categories: Feminist Magazine
- Founded: 1972; 54 years ago
- Final issue: 1993
- Country: United Kingdom
- Language: English
- Website: https://archive.org/details/spareribmagazines (archive)

Spare Rib was a second-wave feminist magazine, founded in 1972 in the United Kingdom, that emerged from the counterculture of the late 1960s as a consequence of meetings involving, among others, Rosie Boycott and Marsha Rowe. Spare Rib is one of the most well-known and influential publications to emerge from the feminist movement in the UK. It was digitised by the British Library in 2015. The magazine contained new writing and creative contributions that challenged stereotypes and supported collective solutions that related to feminist issues. It was published between 1972 and 1993. The title derives from the Biblical reference to Eve, the first woman, created from Adam's rib. The masthead was designed by typographer Kate Hepburn.

== History ==
The first issue of Spare Rib was published in London in June 1972. Spare Rib was associated with the international women in print movement, which aimed to establish alternative communications networks created by and for women. It was distributed by Seymour Press to big chains including W. H. Smith & Son and Menzies — although the former refused to stock issue 13, due to the use of an expletive on the issue's back cover. Selling at first around 20,000 copies a month, it was circulated more widely through women's groups and networks. From 1976, Spare Rib was distributed by Publications Distribution Cooperative to a network of radical and alternative bookshops.

The magazine's purpose, as described in its editorial, was to investigate and present alternatives to the traditional gendered roles of virgin, wife, or mother.

The name Spare Rib started as a joke referring to biblical Eve being fashioned out of Adam's rib, implying that a woman had no independence from the beginning of time.

The Spare Rib manifesto stated:

The concept of Women's Liberation is widely misunderstood, feared and ridiculed. Many women remain isolated and unhappy. We want to publish Spare RIB to try to change this. We believe that women's liberation is of vital importance to women now and, intrinsically, to the future of our society. Spare RIB will reach out to all women, cutting across material, economic and class barriers, to approach them as individuals in their own right.

Early articles were linked closely with left-leaning political theories of the time, especially anti-capitalism and the exploitation of women as consumers through fashion. During this period, the magazine often published anti-consumerist articles about DIY beauty, fashion, cookery, and crafting. Spare Rib was also selective about advertisements in an attempt to remain committed to their feminist ethos even while operating in a capitalist market.

As the women's movement evolved during the 1970s, the magazine became a forum for debate among members of the different streams that emerged within the movement, such as socialist feminism, radical feminism, lesbian feminism, liberal feminism, and black feminism. Spare Rib included contributions from well-known international feminist writers, activists, and theorists, as well as stories about ordinary women in their own words. Subjects included the "liberating orgasm", "kitchen sink racism", anorexia, and female genital mutilation. The magazine reflected debates about how best to tackle issues such as sexuality and racism. Opposition to Spare Rib came from many people, including author Jilly Cooper, who was critical of it in her 1982 book Jolly Marsupial.

Due to falling subscriptions and low advertising revenue, Spare Rib ceased publication in 1993.

== Editors ==
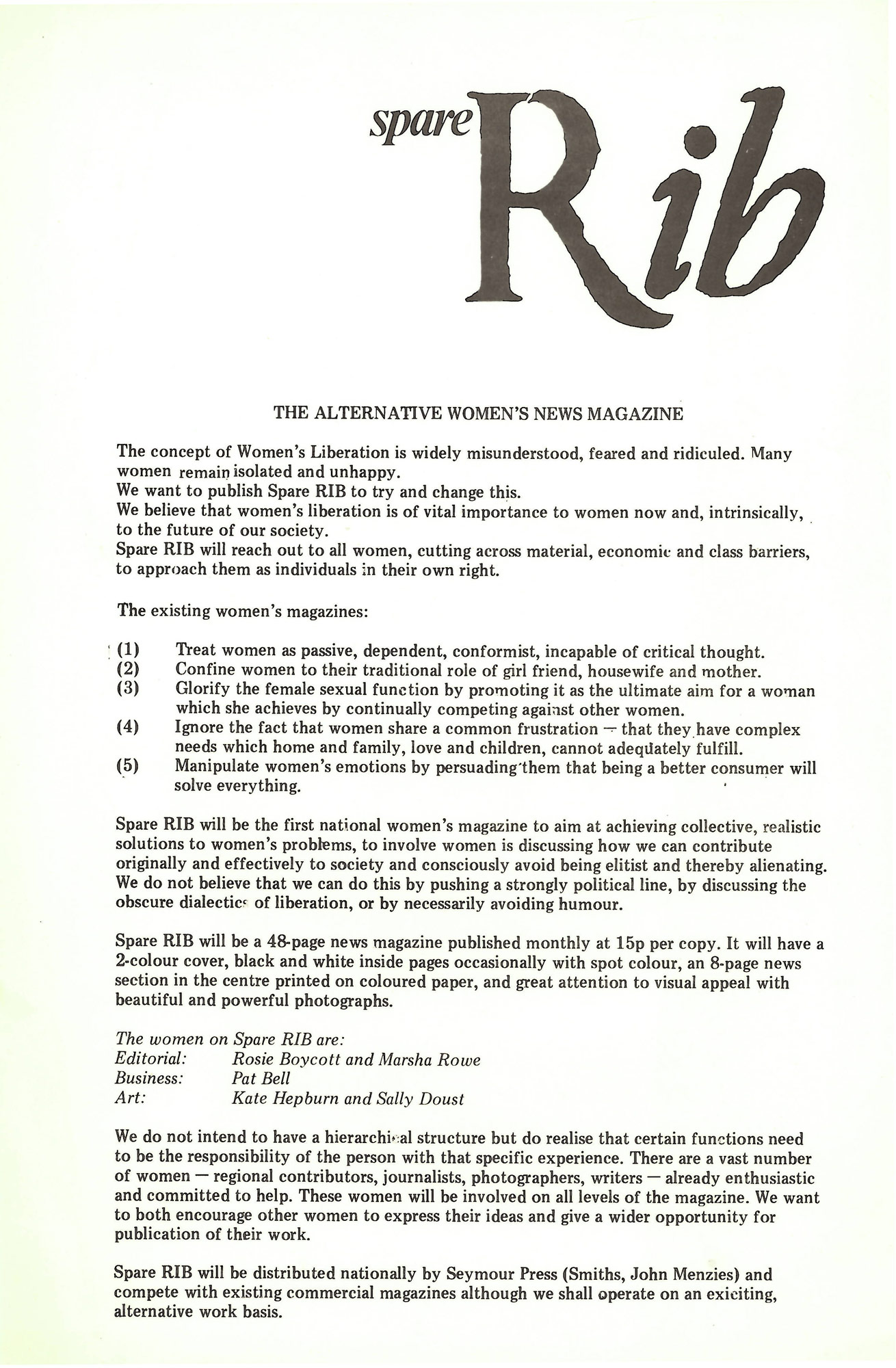
The Spare Rib manifesto.

Spare Rib became a collective by the end of 1973. The collective editorial policy was to "collectively decide on articles that they publish, and work closely with the contributors. Accept articles from men only when there is no other resource available." Drew Howie was a consultant from 1990 to 1993.

== Design ==
According to Marsha Rowe, one of the original magazine designers, the "look" of Spare Rib was born out of necessity: it had to look like a women's magazine, yet with contents that did not reflect conformist stereotyping of women. Spare Rib covers were often controversial. The design had to be both stable and flexible to allow for future change while retaining the basic identity. Integral to every decision was cost.

Finding non-sexist advertising in accordance with the values of the magazine was another challenge.

== Legacy ==
Scholar Laurel Forster wrote in 2022 for the 50th anniversary of Spare Rib's first issue: "The self-expression and persuasive writing of the pioneering magazine have their legacy in feminist media today. [...] Because of its standing in feminist history, Spare Rib has become a touchstone for later feminist magazines." Forster has also called Spare Rib "the best-known feminist magazine of the second wave." In their 2017 book Re-reading Spare Rib, Angela Smith and Sheila Quaid wrote that Spare Rib played a key role in the development of second-wave feminist thought and its spread into the collective consciousness.

It was reported by The Guardian in April 2013 that the magazine was due to be relaunched, with journalist Charlotte Raven at the helm. It was subsequently announced that while a magazine and website were to be launched, they would have a different name.

In May 2015, the British Library put its complete archive of Spare Rib online. The project was led by Polly Russell, the curator behind an oral history of the women's liberation movement. The archive was presented with new views on the subject matter and themes, curated by expert commentators. The British Library website describes the value of Spare Rib for current readers and researchers:

Spare Rib was the largest feminist circulating magazine of the Women's Liberation Movement (WLM) in Britain of the 1970s and 80s. It remains one of the movement's most visible achievements. The trajectory of Spare Rib charted the rise and demise of the Women's Liberation Movement and as a consequence is of interest to feminist historians, academics and activists and to those studying social movements and media history.

In February 2019, the British Library announced a possible suspension of access to the archive in the event of a no-deal Brexit, due to problems relating to copyright. It was announced in December 2020 that access would be withdrawn at the end of the transition period.

== Sources ==
- Forster, Laurel (2016). "Spreading the Word: Feminist Print Cultures and the Women's Liberation Movement". Women's History Review. 25 (5): 812–831. doi:10.1080/09612025.2015.1132878.
- Spare Rib collection at the LSE Women's Library
- History of Spare Rib from the Bristol University History Department
- Interview with Marsha Rowe. 31 January 2008. Retrieved June 2008.
- O'Sullivan, Sue. "Feminists and Flourbombs". Channel 4. Archived from the original on 16 September 2008.
- Spare Rib by Hazel K. Bell. The National Housewives Register's Newsletter no. 19, Autumn 1975, pp. 10–11. Retrieved June 2008.
- Smith, Angela; Quaid, Sheila (2017). "Introduction". In Smith, Angela (ed.). Re-reading Spare Rib. Palgrave Macmillan. pp. 1–21. ISBN 978-3-319-49309-1.
- Steiner, Linda; Chambers, Deborah; Fleming, Carole (2004). "Women's alternative media in broadcasting and the Internet". In Steiner, Linda; Chambers, Deborah; Fleming, Carole (eds.). Women and journalism. London New York: Routledge. p. 166. ISBN 978-0-203-50066-8.
