= The Rise of the Creative Class =

2002 book by Richard Florida

- Author: Richard Florida
- Subject: Creative class
- Publisher: Basic Books
- Publication date: 2002
- ISBN: 9780465024766

The Rise of the Creative Class is a 2002 non-fiction book that was written by noted American sociologist and economist Richard Florida. Updated in 2019 with a new preface, the book is one of a series for general audiences by Florida about the connection between place and economy.

== See also ==
- The Cultural Creatives
