= LOHAS =

Demographic defining a particular market segment

Lifestyles of Health and Sustainability (LOHAS) is a demographic defining a particular market segment related to sustainable living, "green" ecological initiatives, and generally composed of a relatively upscale and well-educated population segment. The author Paul H. Ray, who coined the term Cultural Creatives in his book by the same name, explains that "What you're seeing is a demand for products of equal quality that are also virtuous." Included in the cultural creative demographic are consumers of New Age goods and services.

Researchers have reported a range of sizes of the LOHAS market segment. For example, Worldwatch Institute reported that the LOHAS market segment in the year 2006 was estimated at $300 billion, approximately 30% of the U.S. consumer market; and, a study by the Natural Marketing Institute showed that in 2007, 41 million or 13% of the Americans were included within the LOHAS psychographic. In Japan roughly 17 million adults or 12% of the population are LOHAS consumers.

== Products and services ==
The marketplace includes goods and services such as:

- Organic and locally grown food
- Organic and natural personal care products
- Hybrid and electric cars as well as city bicycles
- Green and sustainable building
- Sustainable or Ecotourism
- Energy efficient electronics/appliances
- Socially responsible investing
- Natural household products (paper goods and cleaning products)
- Complementary, alternative and preventive medicine (Naturopathy, Chinese medicine, etc.)
- Fair trade products
- Literature in the Mind/Body/Soul, Holistic Health, and New Age genres

== See also ==
- Green marketing
- List of New Age topics
- Natural Capitalism
- Simple living – Sometimes called LOVOS, Lifestyles of Voluntary Simplicity
- Sustainable business
- Triple bottom line
