= Megasite =

Type of private land development

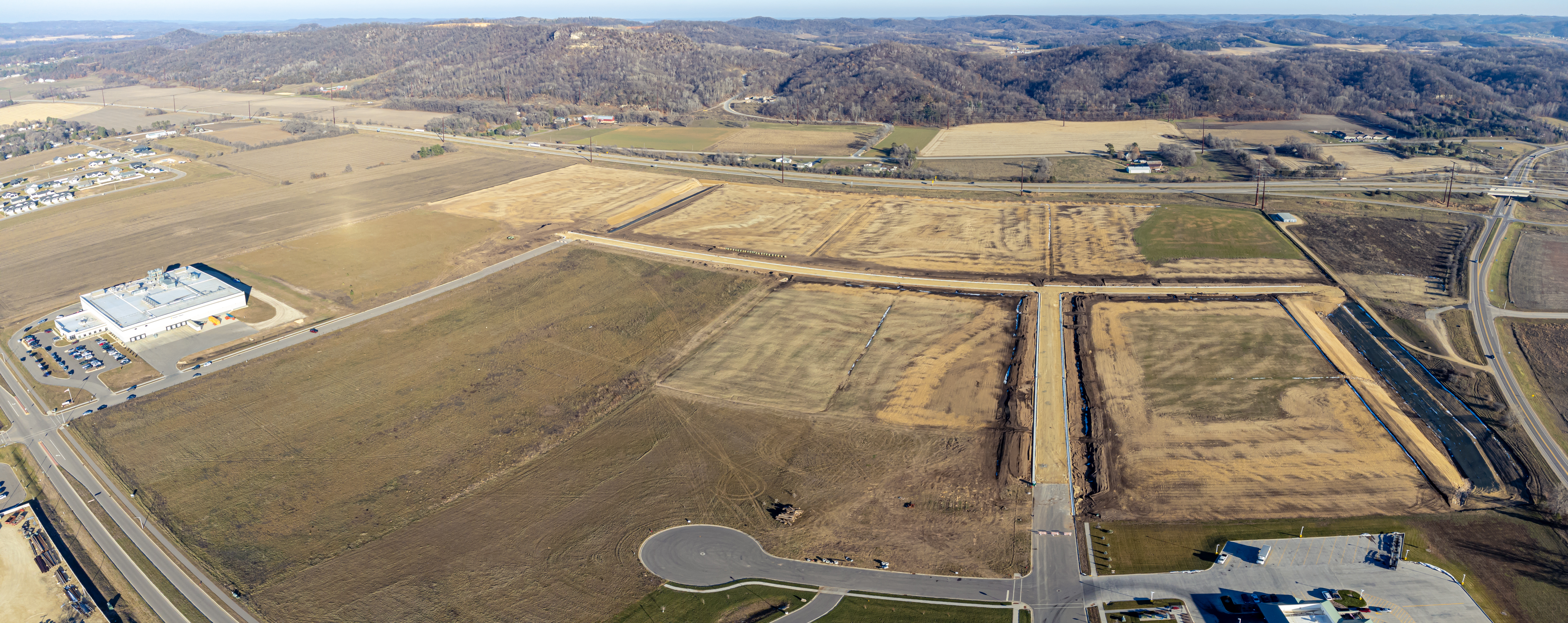
Mega-site being developed in Holmen, Wisconsin off US-53 and Wis-35. 50 acres for commercial property and 25 acres for light industrial which was previously agricultural land.

A megasite or mega-site is a land development by private developers, universities, or governments to promote business clusters. These organizations develop the land so that it is "shovel ready" for big business, by improving the infrastructure (roads, utilities, landscape, and hydrology). Megasites can be an industrial district, business park, research park, science park, commercial district, tourist park or a combination of these.

== Location ==
Megasites are located in suburban to rural areas, in contrast to business districts located in downtown city centers. These sites are typically created close to pre-existing transportation infrastructure (interstates, railroads, intermodal ports, airports, and rivers) and public utilities (electricity, substations, three-phase electric power, natural gas, water, sewage, fixed-line, and broadband internet services from coaxial cable to fiber-optic and mobile broadband). It's also located close to human capital such as large populations, universities, or trade schools. Land area for these sites can range from several hundred to several thousand acres.

== Examples ==
=== Government ===
Memphis Regional Megasite, Golden Triangle (Mississippi), and Research Triangle Park (North Carolina) are examples of government-initiated megasites in America.

=== Private ===
CenterPoint Properties, Eastman Business Park, and Denver Tech Center are examples of private Mega-Sites.

=== University ===
Stanford Industrial Park (now Stanford Research Park) was the first university to facilitate a private Megasite, that helped in the creation of Silicon Valley.

== Military bases to megasites ==
Decommissioned military bases have been converted in the past to economic hubs. They repurpose the buildings and redevelop the land while working with and selling/leasing the land to private developers.

== See also ==
- Industrial district
- Business park
- Research park
- Science park
- Hsinchu Science and Industrial Park
- Songdo International Business District
- Stanford Research Park
- Silicon Valley
- Base Realignment and Closure
- Water tower cellular
