= Creative class =

Proposed socioeconomic class

The creative class is a socioeconomic class concept proposed by American urban studies theorist Richard Florida. Florida, a professor and head of the Martin Prosperity Institute at the Rotman School of Management at the University of Toronto, argues that the creative class is a key driving force for the economic development of post-industrial cities in North America.

== Overview ==
Florida describes the creative class as comprising 40 million workers (about 30 percent of the U.S. workforce). He breaks the class into two broad sections, derived from Standard Occupational Classification System codes:

- Super-creative core: This group comprises about 12 percent of all U.S. jobs. It includes a wide range of occupations (e.g. science, engineering, education, computer programming, research), with arts, design, and media workers forming a small subset. Florida considers those belonging to this group to "fully engage in the creative process" (2002, p. 69). The Super-Creative Core is considered innovative, creating commercial products and consumer goods. The primary job function of its members is to be creative and innovative. "Along with problem solving, their work may entail problem finding" (Florida, 2002, p. 69).
- Creative professionals: These professionals are the classic knowledge-based workers and include those working in healthcare, business and finance, the legal profession, and education. They "draw on complex bodies of knowledge to solve specific problems" using higher degrees of education to do so (Florida, 2002).

In addition to these two main groups of creative people, the usually much smaller group of Bohemians is also included in the creative class.

In his 2002 study, Florida concluded that the creative class would be the leading force of growth in the economy expected to grow by over 10 million jobs in the next decade, which would in 2012 equal almost 40% of the population.

== Background ==
The social theories advanced by Florida have sparked much debate and discussion. Florida's work proposes that a new or emergent class—or demographic segment made up of knowledge workers, intellectuals and various types of artists—is an ascendant economic force, representing either a major shift away from traditional agriculture- or industry-based economies or a general restructuring into more complex economic hierarchies.

The theses developed by Florida in various publications were drawn from, among other sources, U.S. Census Bureau demographic data, focusing first on economic trends and shifts apparent in major U.S. cities, with later work expanding the focus internationally.

A number of specific cities and regions (including California's Silicon Valley, Washington, DC, Baltimore, Boston's Route 128, The Triangle in North Carolina, Austin, Seattle, Bangalore, Dublin and Sweden) have come to be identified with these economic trends. In Florida's publications, the same places are also associated with large Creative Class populations.

Florida argues that the creative class is socially relevant because of its members' ability to spur regional economic growth through innovation (2002).

Walter Grünzweig, professor for American Studies at Technical University of Dortmund, has shown that the origin of the term “creative class” does not lie with Florida, but instead goes back to a passage in Ralph Waldo Emerson's essay "Power" in his collection The Conduct of Life (1860).

== Occupations ==
Florida says that the creative class is a class of workers whose job is to create meaningful new forms (2002). It is composed of scientists and engineers, university professors, poets and architects, and also includes "people in design, education, arts, music and entertainment, whose economic function is to create new ideas, new technology and/or creative content" (Florida, 2002, p. 8). The designs of this group are seen as broadly transferable and useful. Another sector of the Creative Class includes positions that are knowledge intensive; these usually require a high degree of formal education (Florida, 2002). Examples of workers in this sector are health professionals and business managers, who are considered part of the sub-group called Creative Professionals. Their primary job is to think and create new approaches to problems. Creativity is becoming more valued in today's global society. Employers see creativity as a channel for self-expression and job satisfaction in their employees. About 38.3 million Americans and 30 percent of the American workforce identify themselves with the creative class. This number has increased by more than 10 percent in the past 20 years.

The creative class is also known for its departure from traditional workplace attire and behavior. Members of the creative class may set their own hours and dress codes in the workplace, often reverting to more relaxed, casual attire instead of business suits and ties. Creative class members may work for themselves and set their own hours, no longer sticking to the 9–5 standard. Independence is also highly regarded among the creative class and expected in the workplace (Florida, 2002).

== The global economy ==
The Creative Class is not a class of workers among many, but a group believed to bring economic growth to countries that can attract its members. The economic benefits conferred by the Creative Class include outcomes in new ideas, high-tech industry and regional growth. Even though the Creative Class has been around for centuries, the U.S. was the first large country to have a Creative Class dealing with information technology, in the 1960s and 1970s. In the 1960s less than five percent of the U.S. population was part of the Creative Class, a number that has risen to 26 percent. Seeing that having a strong Creative Class is vital in today's global economy, Europe is now almost equal with America's numbers for this group. Inter-city competition to attract members of the Creative Class has developed.

Following an empirical study across 90 nations, Rindermann et al. (2009) argued that high-ability classes (or smart classes) are responsible for economic growth, stable democratic development, and positively valued political aspects (government effectiveness, rule of law, and liberty).

== Places of high creative class populations ==
Florida's use of census and economic data, presented in works such as The Rise of the Creative Class (2002), Cities and the Creative Class (2004), and The Flight of the Creative Class (2007), as well as Bobos in Paradise by David Brooks (whose "bobos" roughly correspond to Florida's creative class), and NEO Power by Ross Honeywill, has shown that cities which attract and retain creative residents prosper, while those that do not stagnate. This research has gained traction in the business community, as well as among politicians and urban planners. Florida and other Creative Class theorists have been invited to meetings of the National Conference of Mayors and numerous economic development committees, such the Denver mayor's Task Force on Creative Spaces and Michigan governor Jennifer Granholm's Cool Cities Initiative.

In Cities and the Creative Class, Florida devotes several chapters to discussion of the three main prerequisites of creative cities (though there are many additional qualities which distinguish creative magnets). For a city to attract the Creative Class, he argues, it must possess "the three 'T's": Talent (a highly talented/educated/skilled population), Tolerance (a diverse community, which has a 'live and let live' ethos), and Technology (the technological infrastructure necessary to fuel an entrepreneurial culture). In Rise of the Creative Class, Florida argues that members of the Creative Class value meritocracy, diversity and individuality, and look for these characteristics when they relocate (2002).

As Florida demonstrates in his books, Buffalo, New Orleans and Louisville are examples of cities which have tried to attract the Creative Class but, in comparison to cities which better exemplify the "three 'T's", have failed. Creative Class workers have sought out cities that better accommodate their cultural, creative, and technological needs, such as San Francisco, Washington, D.C., Austin, Seattle, Toronto and Portland, Oregon. Florida also notes that Lexington and Milwaukee, Wisconsin have the ingredients to be a "leading city in a new economy".

The "Creativity Index" is another tool that Florida uses to describe how members of the Creative Class are attracted to a city. The Creativity Index includes four elements: "the Creative Class share of the workforce; innovation, measured as patents per capita; high tech industry, using the Milken Institute's widely accepted Tech Pole Index…; and diversity, measured by the Gay Index, a reasonable proxy for an area's openness" (2002, pp. 244–5). Using this index, Florida rates and ranks cities in terms of innovative high-tech centers, with San Francisco being the highest ranked (2002).

Florida and others have found a strong correlation between those cities and states that provide a more tolerant atmosphere toward culturally unconventional people, such as gays, artists, and musicians (exemplified by Florida's "Gay Index" and "Bohemian Index" developed in The Rise of the Creative Class), and the numbers of Creative Class workers that live and move there (2002).

Research involving the preferences and values of this new socioeconomic class has shown that where people choose to live can no longer be predicted according to conventional industrial theories (such as "people will go to where the jobs/factories are"). Creative workers are no longer bound by physical products, rather working with intellectual products. Their migration to metropolitan urban areas where creative work is available is more due to the attraction of leisure life and community rather than actual work. Although the Creative Class works towards the globalization of progressive and innovative ideas and products, they can also be considered to value local community and local autonomy. Sociologists and urban theorists have noted a gradual and broad shift of values over the past decade. Creative workers are looking for cultural, social, and technological climates in which they feel they can best "be themselves".

"The main assumption underlying this approach is that creative workers seek creative outlets in all aspects of their lives and therefore migrate to cities that actively support their preferred lifestyles" (Donegan et al., 2008, p. 181).

Each year Florida and the Martin Prosperity Institute release the Global Creativity Index, an international study of nations, ranking countries on the 3Ts of economic development - talent, technology, and tolerance. "The GCI is a broad-based measure for advanced economic growth and sustainable prosperity based on the 3Ts of economic development - talent, technology, and tolerance. It rates and ranks 139 nations worldwide on each of these dimensions and on our overall measure of creativity and prosperity" (Florida et al., 2015). The GCI takes into account the diversity of geographical locations noting their openness as the means for progressive ideas to prosper. "Tolerance and openness to diversity is part and parcel of the broad cultural shift toward post-materialist values... Tolerance—or, broadly speaking openness to diversity—provides an additional source of economic advantage that works alongside technology and talent" (Florida, 2012, p. 233). Diversity allows these locations to attract creative individuals and therefore stimulate economic growth. The findings from the 2015 GCI measured 139 countries on their creativity and prosperity. Ranked number one on the 2015 GCI is Australia.

== Lifestyle ==
The diverse and individualistic lifestyles enjoyed by the Creative Class involve active participation in a variety of experiential activities. Florida (2002) uses the term "Street Level Culture" to define this kind of stimulation. Street Level Culture may include a "teeming blend of cafes, sidewalk musicians, and small galleries and bistros, where it is hard to draw the line between participant and observer, or between creativity and its creators" (p. 166). Members of the Creative Class enjoy a wide variety of activities (e.g., traveling, antique shopping, bike riding, and running) that highlight the collective interest in being participants and not spectators (Florida, 2002).

== Criticisms ==
Numerous studies have found fault with the logic or empirical claims of Florida's Creative Class theory. This body of critical empirical research demonstrates how the Creative Class thesis, and the associated creative city policy prescriptions, in fact exacerbate social and economic inequalities in cities in North America, Europe, Australia, and Asia. Jamie Peck argues that the Creative Class theory offers no causal mechanism and suffers from circular logic. John Montgomery writes that "what Florida has devised is a set of indices which simply mirror more fundamental truths about creative milieux or dynamic cities." Montgomery also disagrees with the cities that Florida designates as most creative, writing that London, not Manchester and Leicester, should be one of the top in the U.K. A critique of Florida's research and theoretical framework has been developed by Matteo Pasquinelli (2006) in the context of Italian Operaismo.

=== Statistical indices and composition ===
Scholars in the disciplines of economics, geography, sociology, and related social sciences have challenged Florida's conception of the "creative class", particularly for the perceived fuzziness of the concept and the lack of analytical precision. A number of studies have found problems with Florida's statistical indices. Hoyman and Faricy, using Florida's own indices, find no statistical evidence that cities with higher proportions of Creative Class workers correlated with any type of economic growth from 1990–2004. By using metropolitan areas as the unit of analysis, the high degree of socio-spatial variation across the metropolitan region is ignored. Studies and popular accounts have questioned whether the creative class is more likely to live in the homogenous, low-density suburban periphery.

Social scientists have also identified problems with the occupational composition of the creative class. Economic geographer Stefan Kratke challenges the inclusion of financial and real estate professionals within the creative class on two accounts: 1) these individuals played a decisive role as the "dealer class" in the 2008 financial crisis, and therefore cannot be considered a basis for sustainable urban and regional economic growth; and 2) the financial and real estate industries (especially in headquarter cities) are economically significant regional/urban players only because they are largely "reliant on inflows of wealth created by productive activities in other regions." Moreover, Kratke argues that the "political class" is also ill-suited to be included within creative class, as they are, in many cases, implicated in neoliberal financial deregulation and the rise in highly unstable urban and regional growth regimes evident through real estate bubbles across the United States and in other countries. In "Urban Development and the Politics of the Creative Class", Ann Markusen argues that workers qualified as being in the Creative Class have no concept of group identity, nor are they in occupations that are inherently creative. Markusen also notes that the definition of the Creative Class is based largely on educational attainment, suggesting that Florida's indices become insignificant after controlling for education. Markusen argues that Florida "does not seem to understand the nature of the occupational statistics he uses" and calls for the major occupational groups to be disaggregated. She questions the inclusion of particular occupations within these broad categories such as claim adjusters, funeral directors, tax collectors, yet argues that "[t]hese occupations may indeed be creative, but so too are airplane pilots, ship engineers, millwrights, and tailors – all of whom are uncreative in Florida's tally." Moreover, it is questioned whether human creativity can be conflated with education since "[p]eople at all levels of education exercise considerable inventiveness."

=== Economic growth ===
Research shows that economic growth is experienced when the significance of scientifically/technologically and artistically creative workers is taken into account, but this macro-level conclusion can be drawn without Florida's creative class theory, which provides more of an "affirmation of contemporary class relations." Other scholars have criticized the very basis for Florida's definition of "creativity" which many argue is conceived of narrowly and is only valued for the potential for financial and economic growth. Studies have too questioned Florida's argument that jobs and economic growth follow the creative class, and the migration patterns of the creative class have been challenged. Rather than validating Florida's causal logic that attracting the creative class will lead to economic growth, empirical research shows that successful regions pull and maintain human capital.

The creative class thesis—and Richard Florida himself—have been criticized for what appears to be a change in Florida's prognosis for America's ailing Rust Belt cities. Florida's message was so quickly and enthusiastically adopted by cities because he argued that any city had the potential to become a vibrant, creative city with the right infrastructure investments, policies, and consulting advice. A 2009 article, "The Ruse of the Creative Class", questions Florida's costly speaking engagements in struggling industrial cities in which he offered optimistic prognoses—and his more recent pronouncements that many American cities may never be saved in the wake of the Great Recession. The creative class thesis has also drawn criticisms for relying on inner city property development, gentrification, and urban labor markets reliant on low-wage service workers, particularly in the hospitality industry. (Note: Multiple sources:) Florida has called for service workers' wages to rise.

=== Grassroots resistance ===
Creative Class Struggle, a Toronto-based collective, has brought these criticisms outside academic circles, challenging Florida's Creative Class theories as well as their widespread adoption into urban policy. The group manages an online clearinghouse for information about creative city strategies and policies, publishes a newsletter and other materials, and works to engage the media and public in critical discussion. In June 2009, Creative Class Struggle and art magazine Fuse organized a public forum in Toronto to debate these issues.

== See also ==
- Creative city
- Creative economy
- Indigo Era (economics)
- Integral theory
- Netocracy
- Quaternary sector of the economy
- The Cultural Creatives
- Thought leader
