= Creative city =

Urban planning concept

A creative city is a city where creativity is a strategic factor in urban development. It offers its citizens places, experiences, attractions, and opportunities to foster creativity.

== Early developments ==
Initially, the focus of partners was on design and culture as resources for livability. In the early 1980s, partners launched a program to document the economic value of design and cultural amenities. The Economics of Amenity program explored how cultural amenities and the quality of life in a community are linked to economic development and job creation. This work was the catalyst for a significant array of economic impact studies of the arts across the globe.

Core concepts used by partners were cultural planning and cultural resources, which they saw as the planning of urban resources including quality design, architecture, parks, the natural environment, animation and especially arts activity and tourism.

From the late 1970s onwards, UNESCO and the Council of Europe began to investigate the cultural industries. From the perspective of cities, it was Nick Garnham, who when seconded to the Greater London Council in 1983/4, set up a cultural industries unit to put the cultural industries on the agenda. Drawing on, re-reading and adapting the original work by Theodor Adorno and Walter Benjamin in the 1930s which had seen the culture industry as a kind of monster and influenced also by Hans Magnus Enzensberger, he saw the cultural industries as a potentially liberating force. This investigation into the cultural industries of the time found that a city and nation that emphasized its development of cultural industries added value, exports, and new jobs, while supporting competitiveness, continuing to expand a city's and nation's growth in the global economy.

The first mention of the creative city as a concept was in a seminar organized by the Australia Council, the City of Melbourne, the Ministry of Planning and Environment (Victoria) and the Ministry for the Arts (Victoria) in September 1988. Its focus was to explore how arts and cultural concerns could be better integrated into the planning process for city development. A keynote speech by David Yencken, former Secretary for Planning and Environment for Victoria, spelled out a broader agenda stating that whilst efficiency of cities is important there is much more needed: "[The city] should be emotionally satisfying and stimulate creativity amongst its citizens".

Another important early player was Comedia, founded in 1978 by Charles Landry. Its study in 1991, Glasgow: The Creative City and its Cultural Economy was followed in 1994 by a study on urban creativity called The Creative City in Britain and Germany.

== Anatomy ==
As well as being the centre of a creative economy and being home to a sizeable creative class, creative cities have also been theorized to embody a particular structure. This structure comprises three categories of people, spaces, organizations, and institutions: the upper-ground, the underground, and the middle-ground.

The upper-ground consists of firms and businesses engaged in creative industries. These are the organizations that create the economic growth one hopes to find in a creative city, by taking the creative product of the city's residents and converting it into a good or service that can be sold.

The underground consists of the individual creative people—for example, artists, writers, or innovators—who produce this creative product.

The middle-ground bridges the gap between the polished upper-ground and the raw energy of the underground. It can be vibrant neighborhoods, buzzing galleries, or collaborative art collectives. In these spaces, underground creativity takes form, disparate ideas coalesce into tangible products, and connections spark between individuals across the spectrum. This fertile middle-ground fosters cross-pollination of ideas and talent, fueling innovation and propelling the creative ecosystem forward.

Proponents of the Creative City model claim; to unlock the economic power of creative industries, cities must nurture all levels of the ecosystem, not just the polished upper-ground. Urban planning initiatives can create vibrant middle-ground spaces, while targeted policies can attract and empower the often-overlooked "creative class" of the underground. This holistic approach can foster innovation, diversity, and ultimately, economic growth.

Richard Florida works on quantifying various measures of the "creative potential" of a city, and then ranks cities based on his "creativity index". This, in turn, encourages cities to compete with one another for higher rankings and the attendant economic benefits that supposedly come with them. In order to do this, city governments will hire consulting firms to advise them on how to boost their creative potential, thus creating an industry and a class of expertise centred around creative cities.

== The emergence of the creative economy and creative class ==
There have been critiques of the creative city idea claiming it is only targeted at hipsters, property developers and those who gentrify areas or seek to glamorize them thus destroying local distinctiveness. This has happened in places, but it is not inevitable. The creative challenge is to find appropriate regulations and incentives to obviate the negative aspects. A valid concern has been the conscious use of artists to be the vanguard of gentrification, to lift property values and to make areas safe before others move in, otherwise referred to as artwashing.

Critiques of creative city and creative and cultural industries highlight them as a neoliberal tool to extract value from a city's culture and creativity. It treats cultural resources of a city as raw materials that can be used as assets in the 21st century---just as coal, steel, and gold were assets of the city in the 20th century.

Florida's work has been criticized by scholars such as Jamie Peck as, "work[ing] quietly with the grain of extant 'neoliberal' development agendas, framed around interurban competition, gentrification, middle-class consumption and place-marketing". In other words, Florida's prescriptions in favor of fostering a creative class are, rather than being revolutionary, simply a way of bolstering the conventional economic model of the city. The idea of the creative class serves to create a cultural hierarchy, and as such reproduce inequalities; indeed, even Florida himself has acknowledged that the areas he himself touts as hotspots of the creative class are at the same time home to shocking disparities in economic status among their residents. In order to explain this, he points to the inflation of housing prices that an influx of creatives can bring to an area, as well as to the creative class' reliance on service industries that typically pay their employees low wages.

Critics argue that the creative city idea has now become a catch-all phrase in danger of losing its meaning and in danger of hollowing out by general overuse of the word 'creative' as applied to people, activities, organizations, urban neighbourhoods or cities that objectively are not especially creative. Cities still tend to restrict its meaning to the arts and cultural activities within the creative economy professions, calling any cultural plan a creative city plan, when such activities are only one aspect of a community's creativity. There is a tendency for cities to adopt the term without thinking through its real organizational consequences and the need to change their mindset. The creativity implied in the term, the creative city, is about lateral and integrative thinking in all aspects of city planning and urban development, placing people, not infrastructure, at the centre of planning processes.

Landry's original Creative City vision, focused on holistic urban transformation, has yielded to a Florida-centric model prioritizing economic innovation and its skilled workforce. This shift has reduced the Creative City to a mere business tool, a far cry from its initial ambition to reshape urban policy. Now, the "thesis" is palatable to existing power structures, neatly fitting into the global economic order. Yet, the debate simmers on. While some cling to the holistic vision of city-wide creativity, others equate the Creative City solely with the economic engine of the creative class.

== Global impact ==
In 2004, UNESCO established the Creative Cities Network (UCCN). UCCN was established to share best practices and partnerships that can help sustain and improve a city's creativity. All cities recognized as a member of the UCCN agree that creativity acts as a strategic factor of sustainable development.

The UCCN have seven creative fields: crafts and folk art, design, film, gastronomy, literature, media arts, and music.

== See also ==
- Creative industries
- Smart city
