= Ken Worpole =

British writer and social historian (born 1944)

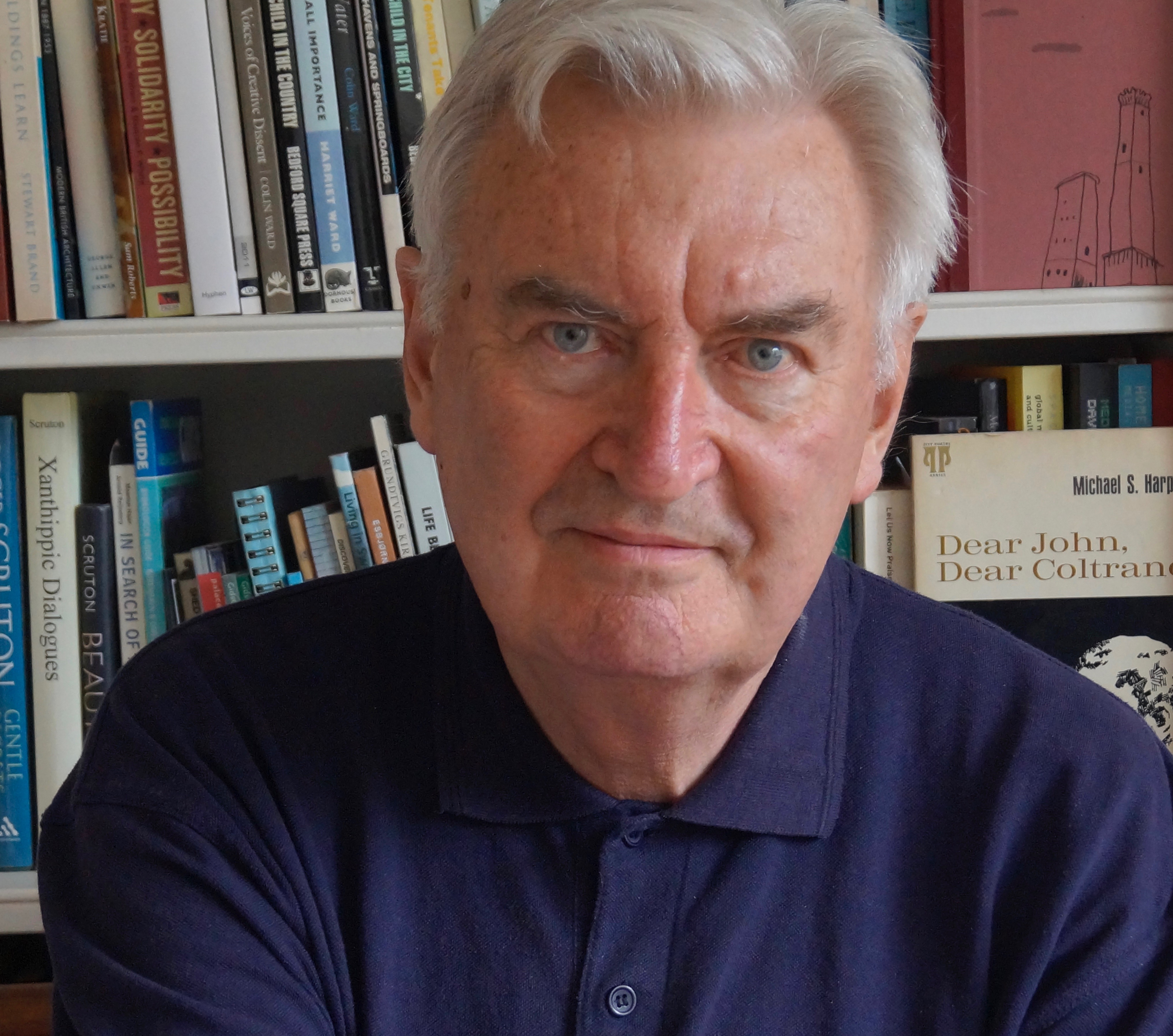
- Born: June 1944 (age 82)
- Education: Southend High School for Boys; Brighton College of Education
- Occupations: Writer and social historian
- Spouse: Larraine Worpole (1942–2025 m.1965)
- Children: 2
- Writing career
- Notable awards: Honorary Doctorate, Middlesex University Fellowship, Foundation for Urban & Regional Studies Leverhulme Emeritus Fellowship
- Website: www.worpole.net

Ken Worpole (born 1944) is a British writer and social historian whose many books include works of literary criticism, architectural history, and landscape aesthetics, and who was one of the editors of the 2001 United Nations Centre for Human Settlements (UNCHS) report, The State of the World's Cities. In 2005, The Independent newspaper stated: "For many years, Ken Worpole has been one of the shrewdest and sharpest observers of the English social landscape." In 2014, ICON magazine similarly observed: "For well over 40 years Ken Worpole has been one of the most eloquent and forward thinking writers in Britain."

== Early life ==
Worpole attended Southend High School for Boys, before training as an English teacher at Brighton College of Education between 1965 and 1969. On completing his training, he moved to Hackney, London, teaching English at Hackney Downs School from 1969 to 1973. He married the photographer Larraine Worpole in 1965 and they have two children.

== Career ==
On leaving teaching, Worpole worked as an oral historian and publisher for the Centerprise project in Hackney. In 1984, he was appointed Director of the Cultural Industries Unit at the Greater London Enterprise Board, leaving in 1986 when the Greater London Council was abolished. Between 1986 and 1989, he worked as a Policy Adviser to Mark Fisher MP, Shadow Minister for the Arts. Since then, Worpole has written or edited some 18 books, contributed chapters to many others, and been responsible for researching and writing a number of influential government and independent public policy reports, including Park Life: Urban Parks & Social Renewal, People, Parks & Cities, 21st Century Libraries and Modern Hospice Design.

His study of European cemetery design, Last Landscapes, was chosen as one of the "Books of the Year" by Architects' Journal, The New Statesman, and the Glasgow Sunday Herald; in The Times, books editor Erica Wagner named it as one of her Critic's Choice of the best six books about death. His study of hospice architecture in the UK, Modern Hospice Design, was the first major study of the hospice movement in Britain from the 1960s onwards, and their influence across the world. In 2015, a reviewer for Town & Country Planning journal wrote: "I've been forced to confront a deeper sense of spirituality in a beautiful new book called New Jerusalem: The Good City and the Good Society. It is by the hugely influential architectural critic Ken Worpole and looks as wonderful as it reads." In July 2021, the editor of The New Statesman wrote: "Worpole is a literary original, a social and architectural historian whose books combine the Orwellian ideal of common decency with understated erudition."

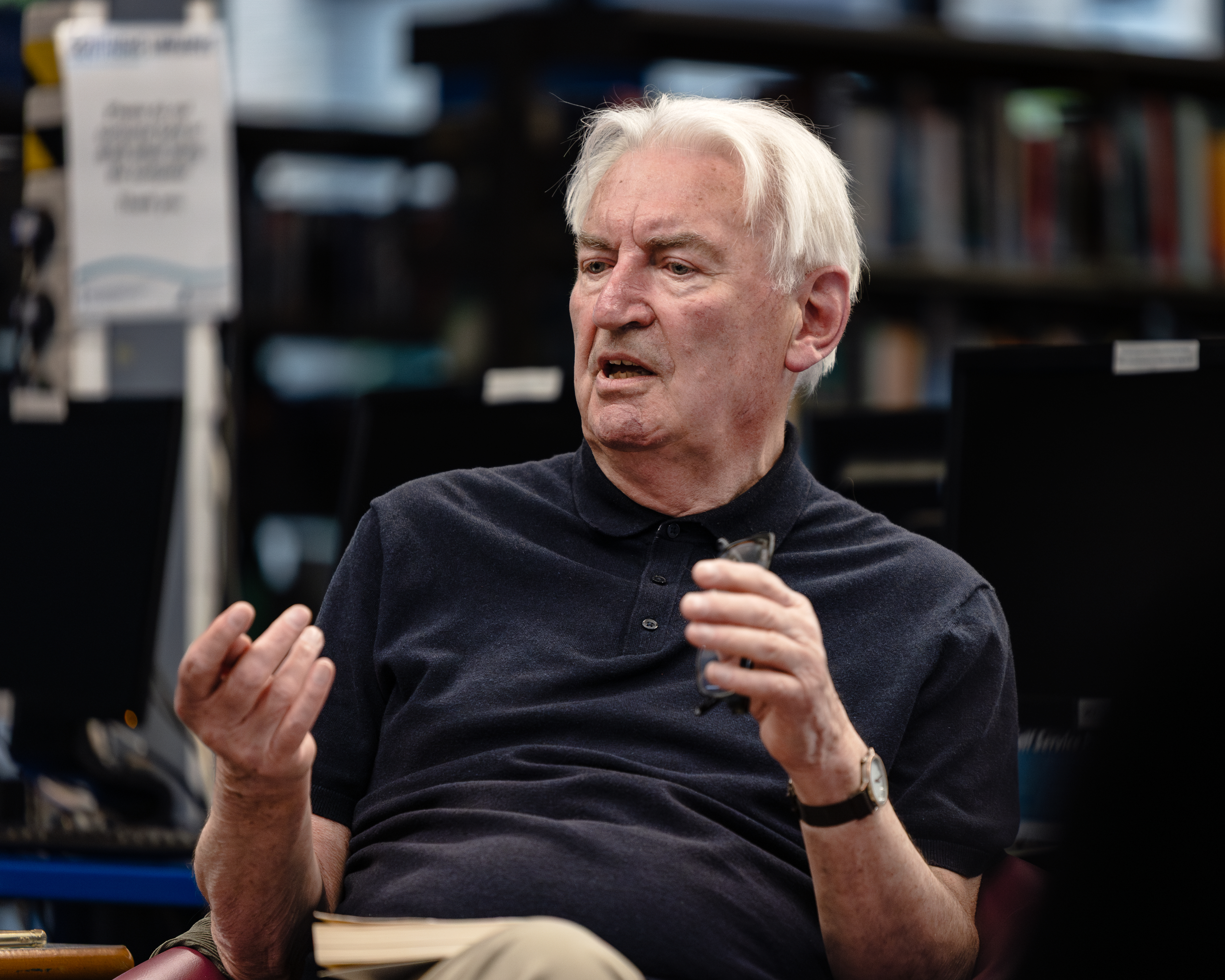
Worpole presents his book Brightening from the East at Westcliff Library, Southend-on-Sea, on 24 April 2025.

== Offices held ==
Worpole was a founder member of the think-tank Demos, a member of the UK Government's Urban Green Spaces Task Force (2001–2002), a member of the Expert Panel of the Heritage Lottery Fund (2003–2008) and an adviser to the Commission for Architecture and the Built Environment (2003–2008). In 2006, he was appointed as a Senior Professor at The Cities Institute, London Metropolitan University, retiring in 2011.

== Honours and awards ==
- 1999: Honorary Doctorate awarded by Middlesex University.
- 1999: Fellowship research award from the Foundation for Urban & Regional Studies.
- 2012: Fellowship research award from the Leverhulme Trust.

== Publications: books ==
- The Republic of Letters (edited with Dave Morley), Comedia, 1982
- Dockers & Detectives, Verso Books, 1983, revised edition Five Leaves Books, 2008
- Reading by Numbers, Comedia, 1984
- Death in the City (with Melissa Benn), Canary Books, 1986
- Saturday Night or Sunday Morning? (with Geoff Mulgan), Comedia, 1986
- Towns for People, Open University Press, 1992, reprinted 1993
- Staying Close to the River, Lawrence & Wishart, 1995
- Libraries in a World of Cultural Change (with Liz Greenhalgh and Charles Landry), UCL Press, 1992
- Richer Futures: fashioning a new politics (as editor), Earthscan, 1999
- Here Comes the Sun: architecture and public space in 20th century European culture (with photographer Larraine Worpole), Reaktion, 2001
- Last Landscapes: the architecture of the cemetery in the West (with photographer Larraine Worpole), Reaktion, 2003
- 350 Miles: An Essex Journey (with photographer Jason Orton), Essex County Council, 2005
- Modern Hospice Design, Routledge, 2009
- The New English Landscape (with photographer Jason Orton), Field Station: London, 2013, reprinted 2015
- Contemporary Library Architecture, Routledge, 2015
- New Jerusalem: The Good City and the Good Society, Swedenborg Society, 2015, reprinted 2017
- So We Live: The novels of Alexander Baron (with Susie Thomas and Andrew Whitehead), Five Leaves, 2019
- No matter how many skies have fallen: back to the land in wartime Britain, Little Toller Books, 2021
- Modern Hospice Design: the architecture of palliative and social care, Routledge, Second Edition, 2023
- Brightening from the East: Essays on landscape and memory, Little Toller Books, 2025
