= Richard Florida =

American urban studies theorist

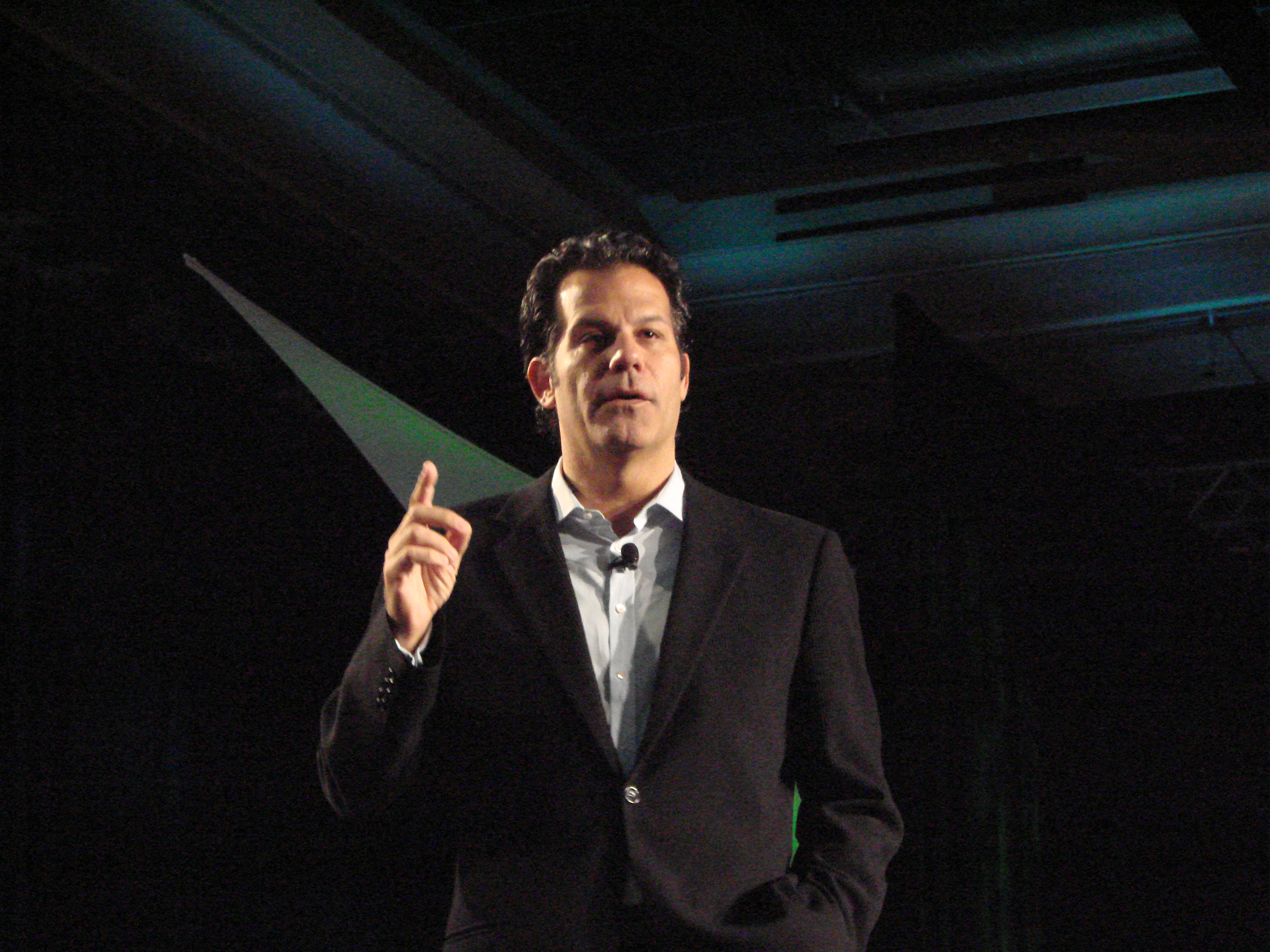
- Florida in 2006
- Born: 1957 (age 68–69); Newark, New Jersey, U.S.
- Spouse: Joyce Davis (c. 1990s) Rana Kozouz (m. 2006)

Academic background
- Education: Rutgers University (BA); Columbia University (MPhil, PhD)

Academic work
- Discipline: Urban studies, economics
- Institutions: Carnegie Mellon University; George Mason University; University of Toronto
- Notable works: The Rise of the Creative Class (2002); Who's Your City? (2008); The Great Reset (2010); CityLab (founded 2012)
- Notable ideas: Creative class
- Website: creativeclass.com

Richard L. Florida (born 1957) is an American urban studies theorist and writer best known for his seminal description of the creative class. He focuses on economic and social theory as a distinguished professor at the University of Toronto's Rotman School of Management and School of Cities. He was a professor at Carnegie Mellon University from 1987 to 2004 before teaching at George Mason University from 2004 to 2007 and subsequently moving to the University of Toronto.

Florida's 2002 book, The Rise of the Creative Class, is recognized as articulating the creative class theory, which underpins his strategy consulting as founder of the Creative Class Group. He also previously served as a senior editor of The Atlantic, where he cofounded CityLab, a news website now owned by Bloomberg. Since 2024, he has worked as a visiting professor to the Owen Graduate School of Management at Vanderbilt University.

== Early life and education ==
Florida was born in Newark, New Jersey, in 1957, the son of Louis Florida, an eyeglass factory worker, and Eleanor Florida. He was raised in North Arlington, New Jersey, and attended Queen of Peace Boys High School. He received a scholarship allowing him to study at Rutgers University in New Brunswick, New Jersey, from which he graduated in 1979 with a B.A. in political science. He first attended the Massachusetts Institute of Technology for graduate school, where he studied political science and urban planning. He then completed an M.Phil. (1984) and Ph.D. (1986) in urban planning at Columbia University.

== Career ==
From 1984 to 1985, Florida was an instructor at the Ohio State University Department of City and Regional Planning. He was later an assistant professor until 1987, when he became an assistant professor in Heinz College at Carnegie Mellon University. He became an associate professor in 1990, professor in 1994, and Heinz Professor of Regional Economic Development in 1996. From 2004 to 2007, he was Hirst Professor of Public Policy at George Mason University in Fairfax, Virginia. He was made a professor of geography and planning and a professor in the Rotman School of Management at the University of Toronto in 2007. He became University Professor at the university in 2016 and has worked as a scholar at the School of Cities since 2018. The title of University Professor recognizes scholars for their achievement among the top 2% of University of Toronto faculty.

As a journalist, Florida worked as a senior editor for The Atlantic from 2011 to 2019. He had previously contributed to the magazine, and was brought on during a hiring spree in 2011. He founded CityLab in 2012, a news website originally owned by The Atlantic and now a property of Bloomberg.

Florida has also held various visiting and non–tenure-track positions. The New York University School of Professional Studies appointed Florida to a research professorship in 2012, where he served until 2020. While with NYU, he conducted research with the Schack Institute of Real Estate and the Urban Lab. In 2024, Florida joined the Owen Graduate School of Management at Vanderbilt University as a distinguished visiting professor while taking leave from the University of Toronto.

== Research and theories ==
Florida's early work focused on innovation by manufacturers, including the continuous-improvement systems implemented by such automakers as Toyota.

Among the most influential scholars of urbanism, (Note: Self-described as "one of the world’s leading urbanists", he was also described as the world's most influential thought leader by a Gottlieb Duttweiler Institute study in 2013, and has been called "one of the most influential urban thinkers in the world".) Florida's work, considered an outgrowth of human capital theory, has influenced American and international cities' policies on economic development, but has been the subject of debate for supposedly exacerbating inequality.

=== Creative class ===
Florida is best known for his concept of the creative class and its implications for urban regeneration. This idea was expressed in Florida's best-selling books The Rise of the Creative Class (2002), Cities and the Creative Class, and The Flight of the Creative Class, and later published a book focusing on the issues surrounding urban renewal and talent migration, titled Who's Your City?

Florida's theory asserts that metropolitan regions with high concentration of technology workers, artists, musicians, lesbians and gay men, and a group he describes as "high bohemians", exhibit a higher level of economic development. Florida refers to these groups collectively as the "creative class." He posits that the creative class fosters an open, dynamic, personal, and professional urban environment. This environment, in turn, attracts more creative people, as well as businesses and capital. He suggests that attracting and retaining high-quality talent versus a singular focus on projects such as sports stadiums, iconic buildings, and shopping centers, would be a better primary use of a city's regeneration of resources for long-term prosperity. He has devised his own ranking systems that rate cities by a "Bohemian index," a "Gay index," a "diversity index", and similar criteria.

In 2004, following the rise of Google, the gurus of Web 2.0, and the call from business leaders (often seen in publications such as Business 2.0) for a more creative, as well as skilled, workforce, Florida asserted that the contemporary relevance of his research is easy to see. One author characterizes him as an influence on radical centrist political thought.

==== Reception ====
Florida's ideas have been criticized from a variety of political perspectives and by both academics and journalists. His theories have been criticized as being elitist, and his conclusions have been questioned. Researchers have also criticized Florida's work for its methodology. Terry Nichols Clark of the University of Chicago used Florida's own data to question the correlation between the presence of significant numbers of gay men in a city and the presence of high-technology knowledge industries. Harvard economist Edward Glaeser analyzed Florida's data and concluded that educational levels, rather than the presence of bohemians or gay people, is correlated with metropolitan economic development. Other critics have said that the conditions it describes may no longer exist, and that his theories may be better suited to politics, rather than economics. Florida has gone on to directly reply to a number of these objections.

Some scholars have voiced concern over Florida's influence on urban planners throughout the United States. A 2010 book, Weird City, examines Florida's influence on planning policy in Austin, Texas. The main body of the book treats Florida's creative class theory in an introductory and neutral tone, but in a theoretical "postscript" chapter, the author criticizes what he describes as Florida's tendency to "whitewash" the negative externalities associated with creative city development.

Thomas Frank criticizes Florida's "creative class" formulation as one of "several flattering ways of describing the professional cohort," this particular one being "the most obsequious designation of them all." Frank places the creative class within a broader critique of the Democratic Party: "Let us be clear about the political views Florida was expounding here. The problem with, say, George W. Bush's administration was not that it favored the rich; it was that it favored the wrong rich—the 'old-economy' rich.... Florida wept for unfairly ignored industries, but he expressed little sympathy for the working people whose issues were now ignored by both parties."

== Personal life ==
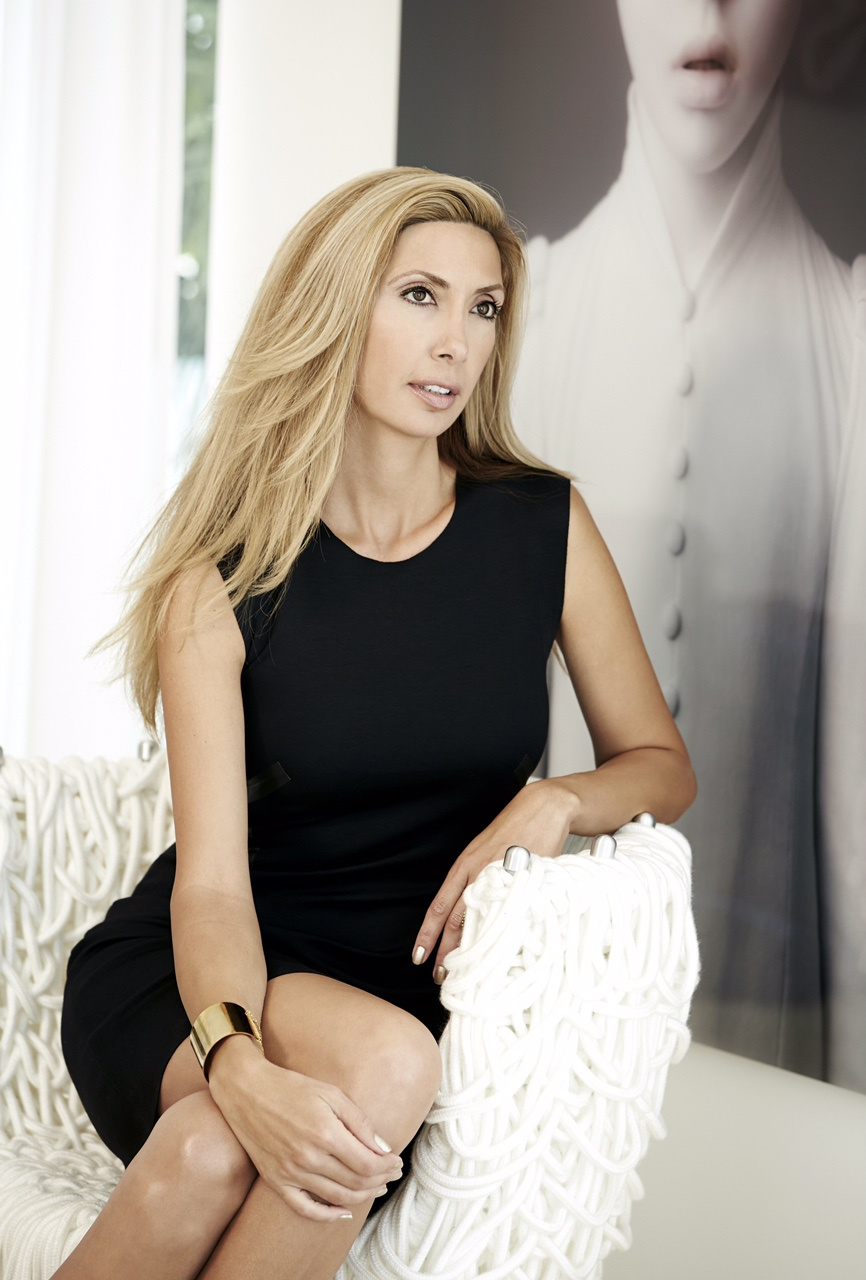
Rana Florida

In the 1990s, (Note: She used the surname Florida as early as 1993, and he acknowledged her in his publications as late as 1995 and 1997.) Florida was married to Joyce-Nathalie Davis, a sociologist and Ph.D. advisee of Christopher Winship. Florida married Rana Kozouz in Ravenna, Italy, in June 2006. They live in Toronto and snowbird in Miami. Rana Florida now serves as the chief executive officer of Creative Class Group. Following 16 rounds of in vitro fertilization, Rana gave birth to their daughter, Mila, in 2015.

== Books ==
- Florida, Richard (2017). The New Urban Crisis: How Our Cities Are Increasing Inequality, Deepening Segregation, and Failing the Middle Class—and What We Can Do About It. Basic Books. ISBN 0-465-07974-1.
- Mellander, Charlotta; Florida, Richard; Asheim, Bjørn T.; Gertler, Meric, eds. (2014). The Creative Class Goes Global. Routledge. ISBN 978-0-415-63360-4.
- Florida, Richard (2010). The Great Reset: How New Ways of Living and Working Drive Post-Crash Prosperity (Canadian ed.). Penguin Random House Canada. ISBN 0-307-35829-1.
- Florida, Richard (2010). The Great Reset: How the Post-Crash Economy Will Change the Way We Live and Work (United States ed.). HarperCollins. ISBN 0-06-193719-3.
- Florida, Richard (2008). Who's Your City? How the Creative Economy is Making Where to Live the Most Important Decision of Your Life. Basic Books. ISBN 0-465-00352-4.
- Florida, Richard (2005). The Flight of the Creative Class: The Global Competition for Talent. HarperCollins. ISBN 0-06-075691-8.
- Florida, Richard (2004). Cities and the Creative Class. Routledge. ISBN 0-415-94887-8.
- Florida, Richard (2002). The Rise of the Creative Class: And How It's Transforming Work, Leisure, Community, and Everyday Life. Basic Books. ISBN 0-465-02477-7.
- Branscomb, Lewis M.; Kodama, Fumio; Florida, Richard, eds. (1999). Industrializing Knowledge: University-Industry Linkages in Japan and the United States. MIT Press. ISBN 0-262-02465-9.
- Kenney, Martin; Florida, Richard (1993). Beyond Mass Production: The Japanese System and Its Transfer to the United States. Oxford University Press. ISBN 0-19-507110-7.
- Florida, Richard; Kenney, Martin (1990). The Breakthrough Illusion: Corporate America's Failure to Move from Innovation to Mass Production. Basic Books. ISBN 0-465-00760-0.
