= FIRJAN System =

- SISTEMA FIRJAN
- Formation: 1994; 32 years ago
- Type: A network of non-profit organizations: FIRJAN; CIRJ; SESI Rio; SENAI Rio; IEL Rio
- Purpose: "To promote business competitiveness, education and quality of life of industrial workers and the whole society, contributing to the sustainable development of the state of Rio de Janeiro."
- Headquarters: Centro (Rio de Janeiro) and Tijuca
- Location: Rio de Janeiro
- Region served: Rio de Janeiro (state), Brazil
- Services: In three major pillars: Business competitiveness; Education; Quality of life
- Official language: Brazilian Portuguese
- President: Eduardo Eugenio Gouvêa Vieira
- Staff: More than 7,000
- Website: Firjan.org.br
- FIRJAN System has more than 10,000 associated enterprises (until 2013).

FIRJAN System is a network of private nonprofit organizations with more than ten thousand associates. Its mission is to promote business competitiveness, education and quality of life of industrial workers and the whole society, in the state of Rio de Janeiro. FIRJAN System consists of five institutions that work in an integrated manner for the growth of the industry of RJ. Together, FIRJAN, Industrial Center of Rio de Janeiro (CIRJ), Industry Social Service of the State of Rio de Janeiro (SESI Rio), National Industrial Training Service of the State of Rio de Janeiro (SENAI Rio) and Euvaldo Lodi Institute of Rio de Janeiro (IEL Rio) promote actions in economic, political and social levels to ensure a prominent position to the state on the national scenery. Today, all institutions act as service providers to enterprises and society.

== Organizations ==
FIRJAN System thus acts in an integrated way through the five organizations that comprise it:

=== FIRJAN ===
FIRJAN develops and coordinates studies, researches and projects to guide the actions of industrial promotion and new investments in the state. Its themed corporate boardrooms and sectoral entrepreneurial forums discuss trends and launch guidelines for actions of support and advice to enterprises. Today, more than 80 industrial unions are affiliated to FIRJAN, representing more than 10,000 businesses around the Rio de Janeiro state.

=== CIRJ ===
CIRJ enables the associated companies access (in special conditions) to the services offered by the five institutions of FIRJAN System. Its goal is to promote business competitiveness and protect the interests of members. The service is personalized.

=== SENAI Rio ===
SENAI Rio promotes industrial learning, qualification and specialisation of workers through various courses. It has a network of 42 fixed operating units - including five technology centres nd 30 mobile units.

=== SESI Rio ===
SESI Rio develops actions to promote health, education, sports, leisure and culture targeted to workers, businesses and society in general. The institution also operates in the areas of occupational Safety and Health and environmental protection. It has 30 operating units distributed throughout the state.

=== IEL Rio ===
IEL Rio promotes business training and develops projects to encourage entrepreneurship, contributing to the industry's modernization and growth. Moreover, it seeks to unite universities and research institutions to the business world.

== Pilars ==
=== Business competitiveness ===
Directed to businesses' economy and sustainable development, it covers topics that go from micro/macroeconomic and investments to segmented studies in areas such as electrical energy, broadband, natural gas and nanotechnology. And if the interest is the tax management and the development of the municipalities of Brazil, there are the studies Fiscal Management FIRJAN Index (IFGF) and Municipal Development FIRJAN Index (IFDM), respectively.

Besides, FIRJAN System awards industrial good manufacturing practices and offers consultancy to companies of all sizes, in various fields (such as legal and environmental). In all actions, its objective is to stimulate "the generation of new businesses, new markets, access to strategic information for competitiveness improvement, as well as the spread of specialized studies that promote the economic development of enterprises. One of these studies include the periodic analysis of scenarios for the coming years in the Brazilian manufacturing sector, which implies mapping the "foreign and domestic investments and pointing out opportunities." Another study, conducted by the Industry Federation of the State of Rio de Janeiro, was inspired by the creative industry in Brazil to analyze the growth prospects of the professions related to knowledge and innovation in the country.

=== Education ===
This field of activity includes the actions of both SESI Rio and SENAI Rio. SESI School operates from kindergarten to high school, presenting plays as one of its educational resources. The initiatives of the SESI Mathematics program applies to SESI schools, SENAI units and public schools as well.

The professional training targets industry segments such as the automotive, the drinks, the electronic and the graphic.

Both school courses are enhanced through the Connectivity Program, which employs new educational technologies to improve teaching and learning.

The technological graduation (upper level) is up to the SENAI Rio Faculty, which trains technicians for the job market.

For the development of Rio's companies – as regards management, processes, products and services – there are the Technology Centers SENAI Rio, focused on the areas of automation/simulation, welding, food/drinks and environment. Both for consultancy and for vocational training.

A common activity of the two entities is the Conecta Seminar, which every year gathers authorities, students and teachers to reflect on the role of the teacher and find the best way of incorporating information technology in education. Partnerships with other institutions are also established to strengthen further the education and citizenship programs.

=== Quality of life ===
FIRJAN System promotes quality of life through services and programs. The SESI Rio units spread throughout the state offer an infrastructure conducive to leisure, sports, health and culture to society.

In addition to the actions carried out in its unities, the entity conducts the program Global Action, a campaign that provides services to populations in need of basic services in the areas of health (such as eye examination and identification of blood type), citizenship (such as CPF issuing and legal advice) leisure, culture and sports (such as handicrafts, choral presentation and sports activities). In communities pacified by the UPP, the SESI Citizenship program makes a similar work, i.e., promotes education, sports, leisure and culture to the locals, only permanently and in loco.

When the goal is to foment access to art, Cultural SESI Rio steps in. It is a program that offers music, theater, dance and other activities at popular prices. Noteworthy are the SESI's X-Everything Cultural, annual event that promotes various artistic events with free admission, and the SESI In Jazz Festival, gathering which unites renowned artists and new talents of Jazz.

== History ==
In order to foment the Brazilian industry, in 1831 it was founded the Helper Society of the National Industry (Sain). (Note: It marks "the origin of the class representation of the industrial sector in Brazil" and, in the 1870s, it sponsored the first Industrial School in Brazil (the one that about one century later became SENAI).) This private company has served for 50 years as an advisory body to the Federal Government, especially in economic affairs of the Empire of Brazil. In 1850 – with the extinction of the Board of Trade, Agriculture, Factories and Navigation – Sain also became plants and inventions organ granting, which Sain itself considered an obstacle to industrial development.

Discontented, industrials associated with Sain requested review of statutes and policies so that they met their interests. In Rio, who defended the interests of the textile sector was the Industrial Center of Cotton Spinning and Weaving, but it lacked a body that would unify all representatives of the domestic industry. This happened when Sain joined the Center in 1904 to be the Industrial Center of Brazil (CIB), which strongly advocated the customs tariff.

=== World War I ===
With the advent of World War I, Brazil's industry eventually benefited in the medium term. As the country was a great importer of processed products from countries at war and these, in turn, drastically reduced exports to focus in their warfare, Brazil was forced to replace imports, thus expanding national industrial park.

"Of the 3,400 industrial establishments existing in 1910, it moved 10 years later to 13,600, with the number of workers rising from 150 thousand to 275 thousand, while the industrial output value increased from 769 000 to 3 million contos de réis."

=== Getúlio Vargas ===
In the 1920s, the country was investing in infrastructure (hydroelectric, ports, telephony and railways) and entrepreneurs imported technology to meet the desire for the most-wanted products at that time. But the big change came a few years later, when Vargas took power in 1930.

To meet both the workers and the entrepreneurs, he created the Ministry of Labour, Industry and Commerce, an industrial nationalist policy.

- Benefits for workers: through new legislation, he set the working time in eight hours and regulated the labor of women and children. He also created social insurance institutes and transformed simple labour into wage labour;
- Benefits for businessmen: he invested in industries, new technologies and diversification of the economy, going against the dominant oligarchies.

=== The birth of the entities ===
In 1931, the Industrial Center of Brazil (CIB) became the Industrial Federation of Rio de Janeiro (Firj) to represent Rio de Janeiro's secondary sector class. Less than two years later the Industrial Confederation of Brazil (who inherited the acronym CIB) was founded, and in 1938, it became the National Confederation of Industry. (Note: CNI now coordinates 27 industrial federations (of the 26 Brazilian states and the Federal District) and represents about 1,300 employer's syndicates. Headquartered in Brasília and with an office in São Paulo, the Confederation "makes suggestions for the construction and improvement of policies and laws that strengthen the productive sector and modernize the country.") In 1937 stepped in the Industrial Unions Federation in Federal District (FSIDF), which in 1941 was renamed Industry Federation of Rio de Janeiro (FIRJ).

It was not by chance that its growth kept on strong during this period: "The industrial establishments, which were in number 13 thousand in 1920, came to 50,000 in 1940, with the value of industrial production evolving in the same period from 3.2 million to 17.5 million contos de réis."

=== Gaspar Dutra, SESI e SENAI ===
However, with the overthrow of Vargas and the entry of Eurico Gaspar Dutra, government investments fell in the second sector, causing the stagnation of the domestic industry. But this laissez-faire economic policy ceased with the end of dollar reserves, in 1947. Immediately after the World War II, Dutra requested CNI to create the Industry Social Service (SESI) – to improve the conditions of workers in areas such as housing, health and transport, aiming at social inclusion and citizenship – and the National Industrial Training Service (SENAI) – to "imbue workers with the work ethic by which industrials love to be guided", i.e., order, dedication and commitment. Regional departments of both "would be operationalized by the state industry federations."

=== Vargas, BNDES and Petrobras ===
In 1951 Vargas takes power and invests again in the basic industry, transport and energy. It is worth mentioning two major actions in this regard:

- The creation of the National Bank for Economic and Social Development (BNDES) in 1952 to finance industrial enterprises and infrastructure;
- The constitution of Petrobras in 1953 to operate in activities related to the oil, natural gas and derivatives sector.

=== Juscelino Kubitschek ===
After the death of Vargas, Juscelino Kubitschek assumed in 1956 and "announced his Plano de Metas, primarily aimed at the sectors of energy (43.4% of the planned investments), transportation (29 6%), basic industry (20.4%) and food (6.6%)." With developmentalism on the agenda, ferrous metallurgy, oil production and hydropower grew a lot.

=== Current situation ===
Since then, FIRJ evolved and strengthened its activities: in 1958 it changed its name to Federation of Industries of the Federal District; in 1960 it became Federation of Industries of the State of Guanabara (Fiega) and, in 1975, became known as Federation of Industries of the State of Rio de Janeiro (FIRJAN), the current name. But the FIRJAN System was implemented only in 1994, when united under a single network: FIRJAN, CIRJ and related entities SESI Rio, SENAI Rio and IEL Rio – respectively created in 1975, 1941, 1943, 1946 and 1969.

== See also ==
- National Industrial Training Service (SENAI)
- Industry Social Service (SESI)
