= Limeira =

- Municipality
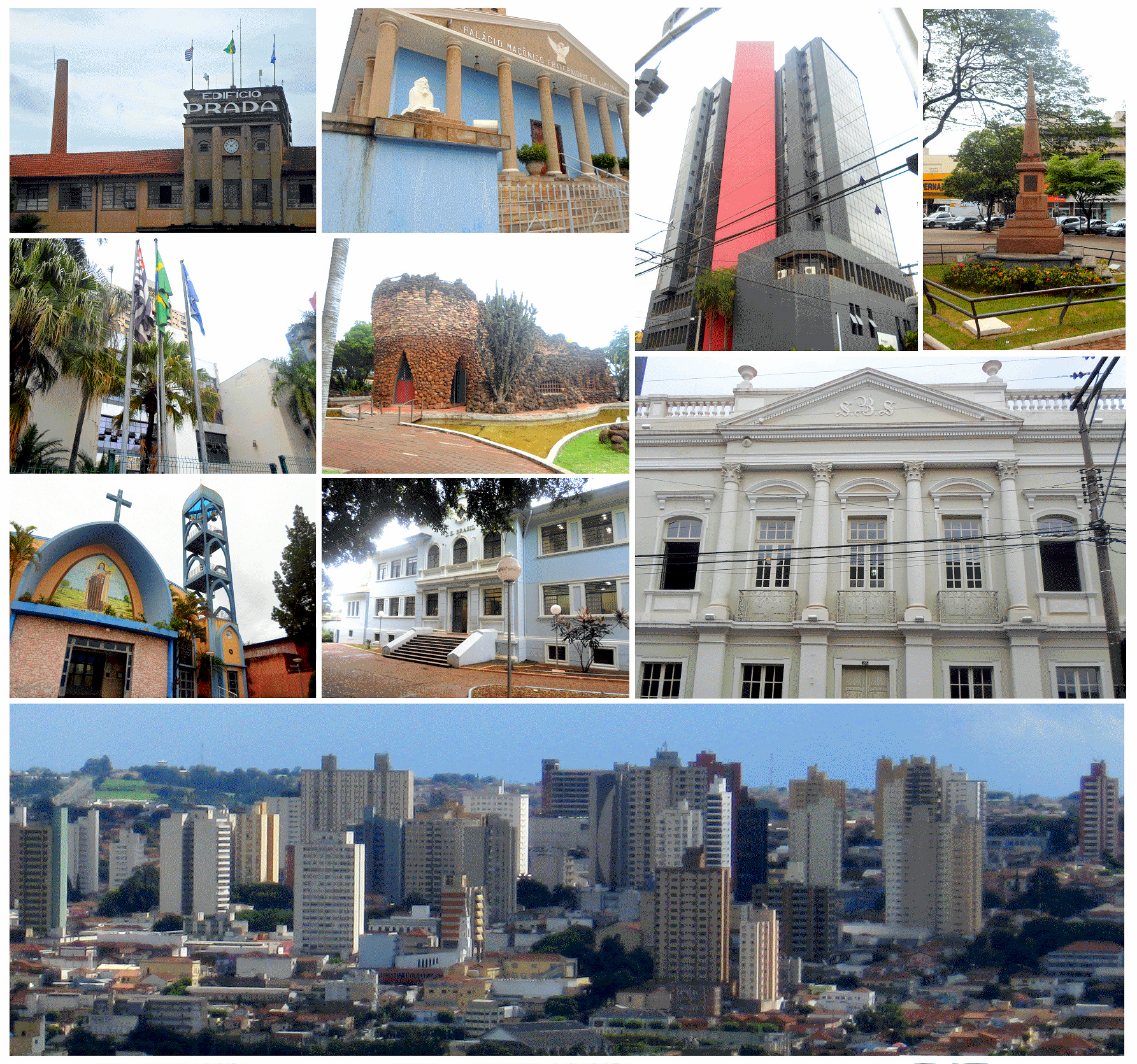
- From left to right, the notable landmarks in Limeira include the Prada Building, the Fraternity Palace, the Commercial Centre Edifice, the revolutionary monument on Toledo Barros plaza, the "Spencer Vampré" City Forum, the Grotto, the Levy Manour, St. Thérèse of Lisieux Church, E.E. Brasil (state high school), and the skyline seen from Jd. Planalto.

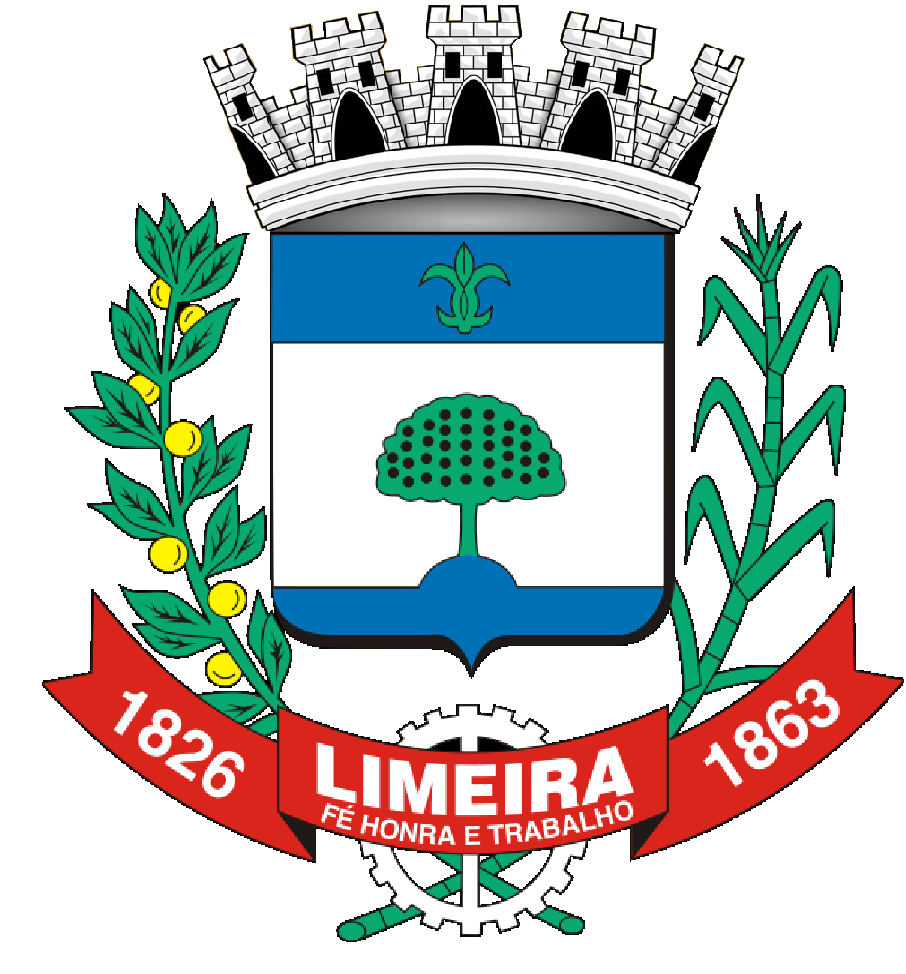
- Flag Coat of arms

- Location in São Paulo state

- Location in Brazil
- Coordinates: 22°33′54″S 47°24′07″W
- Country: Brazil
- Region: Southeast
- State: São Paulo
- Founded: 1826
- City Established: April 18, 1863

Government
  - Mayor: Murilo Félix (2025) (PODE)

Area
  - Total: 581 km^{2} (224 sq mi)
- Elevation: 588 m (1,929 ft)

Population (2022)
  - Total: 291,869
  - Estimate (2025): 301,292
  - Density: 502/km^{2} (1,300/sq mi)
- Time zone: UTC-03:00 (BRT)
- HDI: 0.775 – high
- Website: www.limeira.sp.gov.br

Limeira is a city in the eastern part of the Brazilian state of São Paulo. With a population of approximately 291,869 people (2022 IBGE.) and covering an area of 581 square kilometers, it sits at an elevation of 588 meters. The city is situated 154 kilometers from São Paulo, the capital of the state, and 1011 kilometers from Brasilia, the capital of Brazil. Limeira is conveniently accessible from São Paulo via two highways: Rodovia Anhanguera and Rodovia dos Bandeirantes.

In the past, Limeira was a significant center for coffee cultivation and played a strategic role in the industry. It also earned the nickname "Brazilian orange capital" due to its extensive production of citrus fruits. However, the primary agricultural focus in the city has now shifted to sugar cane cultivation. Limeira has gained international recognition as "Brazil's plated jewelry capital" due to its thriving industry in plated and semi-jewelry. More than 450 companies in Limeira are responsible for half of Brazil's exports in this sector.

Limeira is part of the São Paulo metropolitan complex, which is the largest in the southern hemisphere, with an estimated population of around 30 million people.

== History ==
The history of Limeira dates back to the economic exploitation of the state of São Paulo, specifically in the mid-1820s, marking the foundation of the Limeira region. The city's name is steeped in legend, offering an intriguing explanation for its origins.

According to local folklore, pioneers would often seek respite at a guesthouse situated approximately 150 km from São Paulo, near the Tatuibi River. In the Tupi-Guarani language, "Tatuibi" translates to "small armadillo." This resting place became known as Rancho Morro Azul (Blue Hill Ranch) due to its proximity to a striking blue-hued hill that could be seen from a distance.

According to the legend, in 1781, a caravan traveling to the wilderness of Araraquara made a stop in Limeira and set up camp near a stream called Córrego do Bexiga, which is now the location of the Market Model. Among the members of the caravan was a Franciscan friar named João das Mercês, who carried a variety of lime orange known as "picuá de limas," believed to possess healing properties for fevers. However, the friar fell ill later that night and attributed his sickness to the limas, suspecting that they had been poisoned. He died during the night, and the following day, he was buried at the same site along with his untouched Picuá de Lima limes that no one dared to consume due to the perceived risk of poisoning. Legend has it that a lime tree sprouted from the seeds of those limes. Over the years, the place originally known as Rancho do Morro Azul (Blue Hill Ranch) came to be called Rancho de Limeira (the Ranch of the Lime Orange Tree).

=== Historical Background ===
The founding of Limeira took place on cleared land situated along the path known as the "Picadão de Cuiabá", an important historical route that played a crucial role in trade and the provision of resources to mines in Mato Grosso.

During the late 18th and early 19th centuries, landowners and farmers from "Cidade da Constituição" (Piracicaba), Itu, Porto Feliz, and Atibaia identified the region as having fertile land for agriculture. They acquired allotments from the provincial government between 1799 and 1820.

The village of Limeira began to develop with the installation of mills and the arrival of slaveholders and slaves. Squatters who had settled in the area were subsequently expelled. According to the 1822 census, the population of the Town of Piracicaba, including the regions of Morro Azul and Tatuibi (both part of Limeira), consisted of 951 free people and 546 slaves.

The road infrastructure connecting Limeira to the capital was inadequate, prompting Nicolau Pereira de Campos Vergueiro to lead a group of farmers, including Manuel Bento de Barros and José Ferraz de Campos, in requesting the construction of a new road. Their aim was to facilitate the transportation of goods from the mills in the region of Piracicaba and Limeira.

Upon the completion of the new road in 1826 and the subsequent formalization of the settlement project known as the Freguesia de Nossa Senhora das Dores do Tatuibi in 1830, the municipality of Limeira took shape. The bustling trade and flourishing development along this road were instrumental in laying the foundations of the city.

In 1842, Limeira was elevated to the status of a village. Two years later, in 1844, the city council was established with Manuel José de Carvalho serving as its first president. In 1842, the village of Limeira was elevated to the status of a town and eventually achieved city status on April 18, 1863. The city's official anniversary is celebrated on September 15, and it is considered to have been founded in 1826.

Limeira holds historical significance as one of the earliest cities in Brazil to embrace privately sponsored European immigration. In 1840, Nicolau Pereira de Campos Vergueiro, owner of Ibicaba Mill, introduced a partnership system by bringing eighty Portuguese individuals to work on his lands. This initiative aimed to replace slave labor with free European workers who would receive certain benefits. German immigrants also joined the workforce at Ibicaba in 1846, further contributing to the transition away from slave labor.

The Ibicaba farm, which became one of Brazil's largest coffee producers during its peak, entered the realm of literary art. In her historical novel, Swiss writer Eveline Hasler accompanies Swiss settlers on their journey and colonization in Ibicaba. In 1996, the property embarked on tourism activities and has since welcomed a considerable number of domestic and international visitors. However, the majority of its revenue is derived from sugarcane farming, as its lands are leased to Usina Iracema.

The Ibicaba farm is known for its historical significance and architectural features. It encompasses structures such as the main house, slave quarters, terraces, and dams, which contribute to the city's collection of historic farms.

== Geography ==
Limeira is located at an elevation of 588 meters in the Campinas Administrative Region, 145 km northwest of São Paulo city. It serves as the administrative hub for the Limeira Microregion, which encompasses eight municipalities: Araras, Leme, Limeira, Pirassununga, Cordeirópolis, Conchal, Santa Cruz da Conceição, and Iracemápolis. The city benefits from its strategic positioning along major road and rail networks, connecting São Paulo state to Minas Gerais and the Midwest region of Brazil. It is also well-connected to a prominent railway line that facilitates the transportation of goods from the Amazon region to the port of Santos. Limeira is situated near the Tietê-Paraná Waterway, a significant water route that links it to the southern states of Brazil and the Mercosur countries. The city is positioned in a region characterized by a peripheral depression, with elevations ranging from 500 to 800 meters. Morro Azul is a notable landmark in the Limeira region, standing at an elevation of 831 meters above sea level, making it the highest point in the area. This prominent feature has served as a reliable reference point for pioneers and travelers, guiding them through the vast territories of the region.

=== Climate ===
Limeira experiences a humid subtropical climate (Köppen climate classification Cwa), with distinctive wet and dry seasons lasting from October to March and from April to September, respectively, and warm to hot temperatures year-round. The average temperature is 19.8 °C (67.6 °F) and yearly precipitation stands at 1300.5 mm (51.2 in). On 17 October 2014, temperatures in the city reached a record high of 38.6 °C (101.4 °F) and its coldest day was 9 July 2011, with a low of 0.1 °C (32.1 °F).

Climate data for Limeira, elevation 562 m (1,844 ft), (1995–2020 normals, extremes 1995–2022)
Month	Jan	Feb	Mar	Apr	May	Jun	Jul	Aug	Sep	Oct	Nov	Dec	Year
Record high °C (°F)	37.5 (99.5)	37.3 (99.1)	38.6 (101.5)	34.6 (94.3)	35.1 (95.2)	32.0 (89.6)	36.1 (97.0)	35.3 (95.5)	39.7 (103.5)	38.9 (102.0)	37.6 (99.7)	36.4 (97.5)	39.7 (103.5)
Mean daily maximum °C (°F)	29.2 (84.6)	29.7 (85.5)	29.3 (84.7)	28.1 (82.6)	25.1 (77.2)	24.5 (76.1)	25.1 (77.2)	26.9 (80.4)	28.5 (83.3)	29.2 (84.6)	28.8 (83.8)	29.3 (84.7)	27.8 (82.1)
Daily mean °C (°F)	23.9 (75.0)	24.1 (75.4)	23.5 (74.3)	21.7 (71.1)	18.6 (65.5)	18.0 (64.4)	18.0 (64.4)	19.5 (67.1)	21.4 (70.5)	22.7 (72.9)	22.8 (73.0)	23.7 (74.7)	21.5 (70.7)
Mean daily minimum °C (°F)	18.7 (65.7)	18.5 (65.3)	17.7 (63.9)	15.3 (59.5)	12.1 (53.8)	11.4 (52.5)	11.0 (51.8)	12.0 (53.6)	14.3 (57.7)	16.2 (61.2)	16.8 (62.2)	18.2 (64.8)	15.2 (59.3)
Record low °C (°F)	11.4 (52.5)	12.9 (55.2)	10.5 (50.9)	4.0 (39.2)	1.5 (34.7)	−0.2 (31.6)	−2.2 (28.0)	0.6 (33.1)	3.0 (37.4)	8.0 (46.4)	7.5 (45.5)	10.2 (50.4)	−2.2 (28.0)
Average precipitation mm (inches)	243.4 (9.58)	173.4 (6.83)	147.2 (5.80)	65.3 (2.57)	54.4 (2.14)	39.8 (1.57)	24.0 (0.94)	27.1 (1.07)	52.5 (2.07)	104.1 (4.10)	146.0 (5.75)	191.0 (7.52)	1,268.2 (49.94)
Average precipitation days (≥ 1.0 mm)	18.2	15.2	13.0	6.7	6.3	5.3	4.1	3.9	6.7	10.4	12.1	15.7	117.6
Source: Centro Integrado de Informações Agrometeorológicas

== Demographics ==
Historical population (municipality)
Year	Population	%±
1920	32,550
1940	44,807	37.7%
1950	46,281	3.3%
1960	60,719	31.2%
1970	90,963	49.8%
1980	150,561	65.5%
1991	207,770	38.0%
2000	249,046	19.9%
2010	276,022	10.8%
2022	291,869	5.7%

== Economy ==
=== Industry ===
Limeira's industrial legacy dates back to 1850 when it first ventured into the manufacturing of agricultural equipment. During the Paraguayan War, Limeira played a pivotal role by producing instruments for soldiers. Between 1907 and 1922, Limeira witnessed the emergence of significant industries, including Chapéus Prada (1907), Café Kühl (1920), and Indústria de Papel Santa Cruz (1922). However, it was after the 1940s that Limeira gained recognition for its industrial sector.

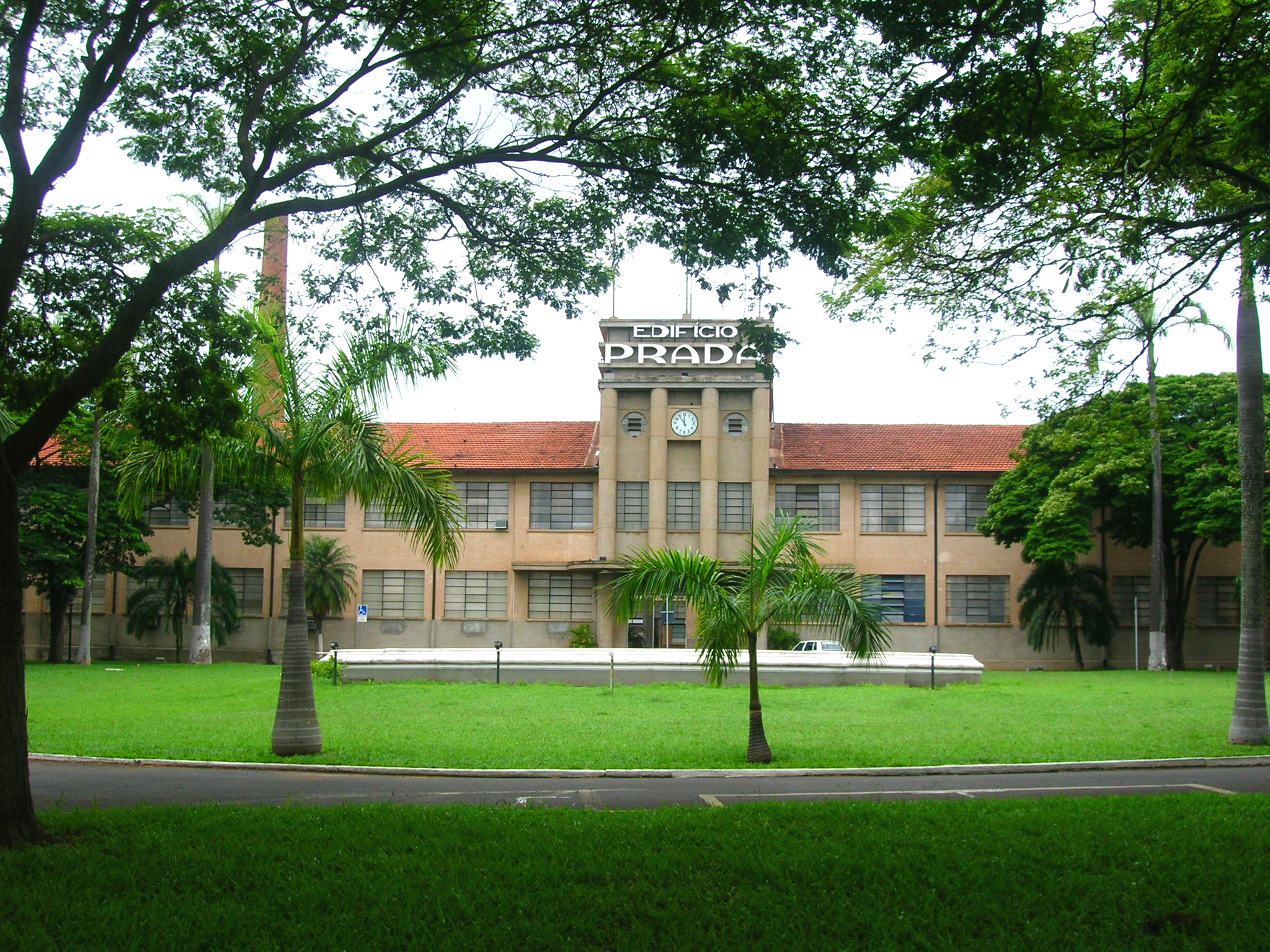
Former Chapéus Prada industrial building, now Limeira City Hall.

Between the 1940s and 1970s, Limeira witnessed the rise of several citrus companies engaged in orange cultivation and orange juice production. These companies catered to both domestic and international markets, including the United States and Europe, contributing to Limeira's reputation as "The City of Orange". Among the prominent players were Citrobrasil (1940) and Citrosuco (1966), which dominated the orange production sector in Limeira. However, the orange industry in Limeira faced a significant setback when the United States implemented protective measures to support its own orange industry in California. This led to a decline in orange production in Limeira. Additionally, the automotive sector gained prominence in Limeira after World War II, with the establishment of companies like 'Freios Varga' (now TRW) in 1945 and 'Rodas Fumagalli' in 1946.

In the aftermath of the 1970s, Limeira's industrial sector experienced a rapid expansion, attracting the interest of multinational corporations. Among the notable companies that established their presence in the city are Ajinomoto. In 1974, the American corporation Rockwell acquired Fumagalli, and in 2000, 'Freios Varga' became a part of the English-based Lucas Group. In more recent years, Limeira has become a preferred destination for Japanese and Korean automotive companies, including Yacchyio do Brasil, Stanley, Mando, DAS, and Faurecia. Furthermore, the city has witnessed the construction of a new plant by the French company Faurecia. In 2011, Samsung made a substantial investment of $300 million to establish its manufacturing facility in Limeira.

Limeira is renowned for its thriving plated jewelry and semi-jewelry industry, attracting customers from all over the world and earning the city the title of "Brazil's capital of plated jewelry."

To make the city more appealing to industries, The local government has implemented various incentive programs aimed at reducing unemployment and informal labor, which have been on the rise along with the city's population. A significant portion of the population commutes to nearby cities such as Piracicaba and Americana for work. According to the Brazilian Institute of Geography and Statistics (IBGE), Limeira had a GDP of R$12.155 billion (approximately U$3.81 billion) in 2017, with the industrial sector accounting for roughly 50% of registered jobs in the city. Limeira's industrial park has been developed and implemented guided by its incentive program, emphasizing its industrial vocation.

Limeira benefits from several advantageous factors for its development, including the expansion of the Bandeirantes Highway (Rodovia dos Bandeirantes), the establishment of the Tietê-Paraná waterway, and the installation of the Brazil-Bolivia gas pipeline.

=== Commercial and Service Industries ===
The commerce and service sector in Limeira is vibrant and diverse. The city is home to over 4,000 retail stores and 3,000 service businesses. The introduction of a shopping complex along the Anhanguera Road in the 1980s greatly stimulated the expansion of Limeira's service industry. In line with the global trends of globalization and outsourcing, a multitude of companies have emerged in Limeira, offering support to the city's industrial sector through modernization efforts.

Although the original mall closed in the 1990s, there is still a shopping mall located in the downtown area known as Shopping Patio Limeira.

In terms of public services, Limeira is home to several regional organizations and government agencies, as well as private institutions like CIESP, SENAI, SESI, and SENAC.

One of the main challenges faced by the city is competition from neighboring cities, which offer a wider variety and more convenient shopping options. In some cases, residents may prefer to travel to Campinas or Piracicaba for their consumer needs. Number of companies in Limeira by sector (IBGE 2001):

- Agriculture and forestry: 37 companies
- Fishery: 1 company
- Extractive Industries: 10 companies
- Manufacturing Industry: 1266 companies
- Production and Distribution of electricity, Gas and Water: 3 companies
- Construction: 170 companies
- Trade, repair of motor vehicles, personal effects and household: 4,088 companies
- Accommodation and Food: 605 companies
- Transport, Storage and Communications: 238 companies
- Financial Intermediation: 73 companies
- Real Estate activities, Rentals and Business Services: 779 companies
- Public Administration, Defense and Social Security: 6 companies
- Education: 106 companies
- Health and Social Services: 114 companies
- Other Collective, Social and Personal: 405 companies

=== Agriculture ===
Rural production in Limeira is primarily focused on sugar cane (for ethanol production) and citrus fruits, which have remained relatively stable over the past two decades, with a slight decline in the late 2000s. The city produces over 1 million tons of sugar cane and more than 11 million tons of citrus fruits annually, accounting for 80% of Brazil's orange production.. Additionally, there is smaller-scale production of avocados, corn, rice, and beans. Limeira is renowned as the leading citrus producer in São Paulo and is particularly known for its production of citrus seedlings.

Limeira has also developed into a prominent center for plant and seedling commerce, particularly in the Geada area along the Limeira-Piracicaba Road (located at kilometer 120). Notable companies in this sector include Félix Plantas, Bonin Plantas, Dierberger, and Chácara Roseira.

== Media ==
There are two daily newspapers available in the city: "A Gazeta de Limeira" established in 1831, and "O Jornal de Limeira," established in 1982. In addition, there are several weekly newspapers, such as "Folha de Limeira," "Folha Cidade Interior," "Folha Cidade Gospel," and "Cidade Mais."

In telecommunications, the city was served by Telecomunicações de São Paulo. In July 1998, this company was acquired by Telefónica, which adopted the Vivo brand in 2012. The company is currently an operator of cell phones, fixed lines, internet (fiber optics/4G) and television (satellite and cable).

== Health ==
Limeira is home to five major hospitals, two of which operate as charitable institutions and receive public financial and management support:

- Santa Casa de Misericórdia
- Sociedade Operária Humanitária

The other three hospitals are privately owned:

- Hospital Unimed
- Hospital Medical
- Hospital Dia (previously known as "Hospital Filantrópico Beneficência Limeirense," which has been closed and taken over by the Santa Casa de Misericórdia).

Serving patients from 92 cities in São Paulo and southern Minas Gerais, the Santa Casa de Misericórdia operates as one of the largest public hospitals in the countryside of São Paulo State. It is the designated facility for the Brazilian public health system (SUS).

== Sports ==
Limeira is home to Inter de Limeira (Associação Atética Internacional de Limeira), a highly regarded football club, along with Independente Futebol Clube. The primary stadium in the city is the Major José Levy Sobrinho (Limeirão), established in 1977.

In basketball, the city is represented by Associação Limeirense de Basquete, competing in the Novo Basquete Brasil and the Liga Sudamericana. Their home arena is the Ginásio "Vô" Lucato.

== Religion ==
Christianity is present in the city as follows:

=== Catholic Church ===
The Catholic church in the municipality is part of the Roman Catholic Diocese of Limeira.

=== Protestant Church ===
The most diverse evangelical beliefs are present in the city, mainly Pentecostal, including the Assemblies of God in Brazil (the largest evangelical church in the country), Christian Congregation in Brazil, among others. These denominations are growing more and more throughout Brazil.

== Sister cities ==
- Saga, Kyushu – Japan
- Ganzhou, Jiangxi – China

== See also ==
- European immigration to Brazil
- German Brazilian
- Piracicaba
- Ajinomoto
- List of municipalities in São Paulo
