= Industry Federation of the State of Rio de Janeiro =

- FEDERAÇÃO DAS INDÚSTRIAS DO ESTADO DO RIO DE JANEIRO
- Abbreviation: FIRJAN
- Formation: March 1975, 15; 51 years ago
- Merger of: FIEGA and FIERJ
- Type: Non-profit organization
- Purpose: To represent Rio de Janeiro's industries at municipal, state and national levels.
- Headquarters: Centro (Rio de Janeiro)
- Location: Rio de Janeiro
- Region served: Rio de Janeiro (state), Brazil
- Services: Industry defense; Regional projects; Regional representations; Corporate social responsibility
- Official language: Brazilian Portuguese
- Affiliations: FIRJAN System
- Website: Firjan.org.br

The Industry Federation of the State of Rio de Janeiro (FIRJAN) is a Brazilian industrial federation from the state of Rio de Janeiro that acts as a representative of the state's industries at municipal, (Note: In all 92 municipalities of Rio de Janeiro state.) state and national levels. The organization, one of the five that comprehend the FIRJAN System, also promotes debates and produces researches, studies and projects aiming Rio de Janeiro's sustainable development. The provision of services to companies affiliated to it (more than 8,000) targets the industrial, social and economic growth of Rio de Janeiro state.

== History ==
FIRJAN was founded in 1975, but its history dates back to earlier decades. In December 1941, the Industrial Unions Federation in Federal District (FSIDF) had to adapt itself to new provisions of the corporate system of Estado Novo regime, and was renamed Industry Federation of Rio de Janeiro (FIRJ), keeping the goal of bringing together unions of the industrial group. At that time, Rio was the capital of Brazil.

Over the next thirty years, the name would change three more times: the first change was in 1958 for Industry Federation of the Federal District (FIDF). Then in 1960, when the federal capital was moved to Brasília and a new federative unit was created, it became Industry Federation of the State of Guanabara (FIEGA). And finally, in 1975 - when the Federation of Industries of the State of Guanabara (FIEGA) merged with the Industry Federation of the State of Rio de Janeiro (FIERJ) - the new entity was renamed Industry Federation of the State of Rio de Janeiro (FIRJAN), a name that is maintained until today.

The FIRJAN System only came to be implanted in 1994, gathering FIRJAN, CIRJ and related entities SESI Rio, SENAI Rio and IEL Rio.

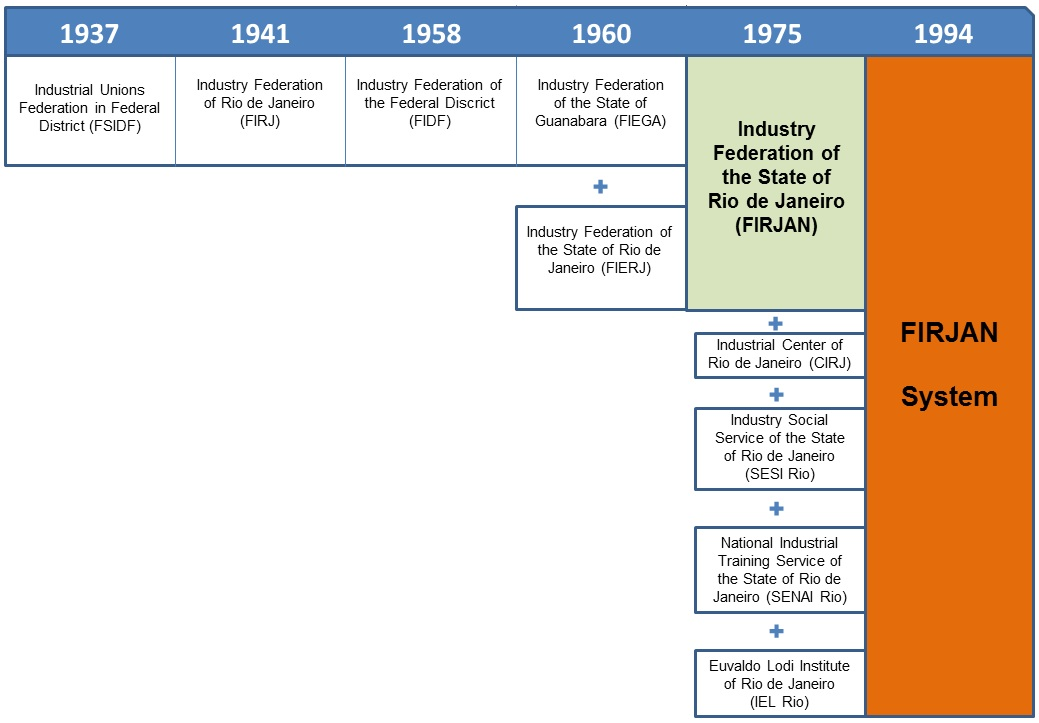
Chronology of the entities that originated the Industry Federation of the State of Rio de Janeiro (FIRJAN)

== Operation ==
FIRJAN develops actions in the economic/business field and is a source for both matters of the State of Rio de Janeiro and national issues. It develops and promotes regional projects in a joint effort by companies, government bodies and various institutions, for example, the Metropolitan Arc, that will withdraw from the streets about 35 thousand vehicles per day, according to the federation's predictions, avoiding another R$29 bi loss for the city of Rio de Janeiro, as happened in 2013;

It also promotes regional representations, through which companies in Rio de Janeiro state act in an integrated manner on several projects with access to relevant information (such as the damage caused by bureaucracy to the profile of broadband in the country) and make their actions known; and Corporate social responsibility, which consists in supporting social politics through partnerships.

== See also ==
- Economic policy
- Political economy
- Management
- Economy of Rio de Janeiro
