= Industry Social Service of the State of Rio de Janeiro =

- SERVIÇO SOCIAL DA INDÚSTRIA DO ESTADO DO RIO DE JANEIRO
- Abbreviation: SESI Rio
- Formation: 1946; 80 years ago
- Type: Non-profit organization
- Purpose: To improve work environment, quality of life and education level of collaborators from Rio de Janeiro's enterprises.
- Headquarters: Centro (Rio de Janeiro)
- Location: Rio de Janeiro
- Region served: Rio de Janeiro (state), Brazil
- Services: Health; Education; Sports; Leisure; Culture; Occupational health; Work safety; Environmental protection
- Official language: Brazilian Portuguese
- Affiliations: FIRJAN System
- Website: Firjan.org.br

The Industry Social Service of the State of Rio de Janeiro comprehends SESI's work in Rio de Janeiro state. The institution focuses in improving work environments, quality of life and education levels of collaborators from Rio de Janeiro's enterprises. Through programs and mobile units, it carries out actions related to health, education, sports, leisure, culture, occupational health, work safety and environmental protection. These activities are aimed at workers and companies, as much as to society in general. SENAI Rio's history is parallel to the Brazilian industrial development and its designation accompanies Rio de Janeiro's changes, as when it became a capital and was renamed Guanabara state.

== Fields of action ==
SESI Rio's programs and unities are meant for industry workers, their families and Rio de Janeiro's population as a whole. In companies, the institution focuses attention on the socially responsible management aiming Brazilian's competitive advantage and sustainable development. Besides the quality of life of workers. In a general way, SESI Rio works in four major fields:

=== Education ===
- General Education/Equivalency Diploma (G.E.D.) preschool, family promotion (to better the worker's social life and family income through courses) and SESI Rio School

=== Health ===
- Medical assistance, occupational health, odontology and health education

=== Sports/Leisure ===
- Sporting, artistic and social activities, employee participation in championships, as in the case of Jogos SESI do Trabalhador (Worker's SESI Game), with contests in regional, state and national stages, support of sporting activities in general (as the population's participation in swimming circuit and athletes' training for the Olympics.)

=== Culture ===
- SESI Cultural Rio program fosters creative industry in Brazil, offering attractions ranging from music shows to artistic awards.

== Programs ==
Due to its social function, SESI Rio focuses on two specific pillars in the state: education and health. Some of the entity's programs are:

- SESI Mathematics: dedicated for high school students and teachers, this program aims to improve the teaching and learning of mathematics in Brazil in an interactive and playful way;
- SESI Citizenship: takes education, culture, health, sports, leisure and food education to the residents of Rio de Janeiro's pacified communities;
- Global Action: along with Rede Globo, it provides public utility services and actions in specific areas (health, education, leisure and culture) for Rio de Janeiro's inhabitants;
- SESI in Action: reduced version of "Global Action", is mainly focused on providing services in underserved communities, in partnership with other institutions;
- MBA in Entrepreneurial Management: course offered by the Federal University of Rio de Janeiro for the managers of public schools and of Rio de Janeiro's SESI/SENAI network;
- Basic education: includes kindergarten, elementary and middle school with technical course, in addition to professional education;
- Evaluation in action: evaluates students entering and leaving SESI School, indicating how the student has evolved throughout school life;
- Transform project: partnership with Rio de Janeiro's City Halls to improve the quality of life of its residents through the education of low-income youth and capacitation;
- Continuing education: includes updating classes in Portuguese (orthography, reading and grammar) and in mathematics (numbers, operations and algebra);
- Brazilian Sign Language (Libras): transmits the initial knowledge of the language through conversation in basic communication situations;
- Pre Enem: studies focused on the Exame Nacional do Ensino Médio, in order to facilitate the access of low-income students to postsecondary education.

== Mobile units ==
The mobile units are trailers and vans with office structure to take up to companies health care for employees. Units can be dental, occupational health and x-ray.

== History ==
Until the early 1940s, Brazil was an agricultural, rural and dependent on imported manufactured goods economy. Gradually the industrial sector was being equipped, but it was still difficult to meet all the needs of the worker. Further during the Second World War. Then, in 1946 (post-war), the private sector exercised its social function and created SESI. (Note: See Decreto-Lei n^{o} 9.403, from 25 June 1946, whereby the president of the Brazilian republic (Eurico Gaspar Dutra) gave "the National Confederation of Industry (CNI) the mission to create, organize and direct the Industry Social Service".) It was industry legitimizing social service. On the same date, its National Department formed the Regional Division of Rio de Janeiro. It was "the beginning of Brazilian industrialization and a new cycle of development that sought to guarantee the country a place in the new international environment."

=== Industrialization ===
Between the 50s and the 70s the economy has changed, with the goal of building an industrialized and competitive society. In 1953, Rio de Janeiro's Regional Division becomes the Federal District's Regional Department, with jurisdiction on the federal capital. But when the Federal District is transferred to Brasília and Guanabara State is created, in 1960, it receives the name of Guanabara State's Regional Department. It turns out that, in 1974, then-President Ernesto Geisel decided to merge the states of Guanabara and Rio de Janeiro (preserving the name of the latter), returning to Rio its status of the state capital. It is precisely in this time of transition, between 1974 and 1979, that it is created the Regional Department of the State of Rio de Janeiro, current SESI Rio.

=== The so called "lost decade” ===
During the 80s, dubbed "the lost decade" by economists, SESI Rio "increased in 328% the number of its services in the areas of Food, Entertainment, Health, Education, Service and Community Actions, i.e., from 4.2 million to 18 million people." (Note: From 1980 to 1994.)

=== The 1990s ===
In the 90s, the policy of expanding through the interior has been strengthened with the installation of units in approximately 10 municipalities.

=== The 2000s ===
In the 2000s the focus has changed to:

- Expertise in Corporate Social Responsibility, with focus on hearing the demands of stakeholders (e.g. employees, consumers, community, government and environment);
- Creation of a network of alliances between similar entities;
- Increase in the number of Mobile Units;
- Appreciation of the sport (as leisure and social inclusion) through championships;
- Creation of distance learning courses for personal qualification.

In recent years, SESI Rio has sought to strengthen its programs for the welfare and quality of life of the citizens of Rio de Janeiro state.

== See also ==
- Education
- Sesinho
