= List of Rio de Janeiro schools, colleges, universities and research centers =

This is list of educational centers in Rio de Janeiro.

== Public colleges and universities ==
- Centro Federal de Educação Tecnológico Celso Suckow da Fonseca (CEFET) - Celso Suckow da Fonseca Federal Center for Technological Education
- Escola Nacional de Ciências Estatísticas (ENCE) - National School of Statistics Sciences
- Rio de Janeiro State University (UERJ) – (Universidade do Estado do Rio de Janeiro)
- Universidade Estadual do Norte Fluminense (UENF) – State University of Norte Fluminense [Located in the nearby city of Campos]
- Federal University of Rio de Janeiro (UFRJ) – (Universidade Federal do Rio de Janeiro)
- Universidade Federal Rural do Rio de Janeiro (UFRRJ) – Rural Federal University of Rio de Janeiro [Located in the nearby city of Seropédica]
- Universidade Federal Fluminense (UFF) – "Fluminense" Federal University [Fluminense, in Portuguese, is someone who is born in the state of Rio de Janeiro. This university is located in the nearby city of Niterói]
- Universidade Federal do Estado do Rio de Janeiro (UNIRIO) – Federal University of the State of Rio de Janeiro
- Instituto Militar de Engenharia (IME) – Military Institute of Engineering
- Instituto Superior de Tecnologia em Ciências da Computação do Rio de Janeiro (IST-Rio) – Superior Institute of Technology in Computer Science of Rio de Janeiro
- Instituto Superior de Educação do Rio de Janeiro (ISERJ) - Superior Institute for Education of Rio de Janeiro

== Research centers and graduate schools ==
- Centro Brasileiro de Pesquisas Físicas (CBPF) – Brazilian Center for Physics Research
- Centro de Pesquisas e Desenvolvimento Leopoldo Américo Miguez de Mello (CENPES) - Leopoldo Américo Miguez de Mello Research and Development Center
- Escola de Comando e Estado Maior do Exército (ECEME) - Army School of Command and Estado Maior [Estado Maior is a sector of the Brazilian army]
- Instituto Alberto Luiz Coimbra de Pós-Graduação e Pesquisa em Engenharia (COPPE) – Alberto Luiz Coimbra Institute for Graduate Studies and Research in Engineering
- Insituto de Energia Nuclear (IEN) - Nuclear Energy Institute
- Instituto Nacional de Matemática Pura e Aplicada (IMPA) – National institute of Pure and Applied Mathematics
- Fundação Oswaldo Cruz (FIOCRUZ) – Oswaldo Cruz Foundation
- Instituto Radioproteção e Dosimetria (IRD) – Radiation Protection and Dosimetry Institute
- Laboratório Nacional de Computação Científica (LNCC) – National Laboratory for Scientific Computing [Located in the nearby city of Petrópolis]
- Observatório Nacional (ON) – National Observatory

== Private colleges and universities ==
- Centro de Ensino Superior de Valença (CESVA) [Located in the nearby city of Valença]
- Centro Universitário Augusto Motta (UNISUAM)
- Faculdade Angel Vianna
- Faculdade Anglo Americano
- Faculdade Arthur Sá Earp Neto (FASE) [Located in the nearby city of Petrópolis]
- Faculdade Carioca
- Faculdade Centro de Cultura Anglo-Americana (CCAA)
- Faculdade de Ciências Agro-Ambientais (FCAA)
- Faculdade de Medicina de Campos (FMC) [Located in the nearby city of Campos]
- Faculdade de Medicina de Petrópolis (FMP) [Located in the nearby city of Petrópolis]
- Faculdade de Odontologia de Nova Friburgo (FONF) [Located in the nearby city of Nova Friburgo]
- Faculdade de Odontologia de Campos (FOC) [Located in the nearby city of Campos]
- Faculdade de São Bento do Rio de Janeiro
- Faculdades Integradas Hélio Alonso (FACHA)
- Faculdades Integradas Bennett
- Faculdades Souza Marques
- Fundação Getúlio Vargas (FGV) – Getúlio Vargas Foundation
- Instituto Brasileiro de Medicina de Reabilitação (IBMR)
- Instituto Brasileiro de Mercado de Capitais (IBMEC) – Brazilian Institute of Capital Markets
- Pontifícia Universidade Católica do Rio de Janeiro (PUC-Rio) – Pontifical Catholic University of Rio de Janeiro
- Universidade Cândido Mendes (UCAM)
- Universidade Católica de Petrópolis (UCP) [Located in the nearby city of Petrópolis]
- Universidade Estácio de Sá
- Universidade Iguaçu (UNIG) [Located in the nearby city of Nova Iguaçu]
- Universidade Gama Filho (UGF)
- Universidade do Grande Rio (UNIGRANRIO)
- Universidade Santa Úrsula (USU)
- Centro Universitário da Cidade do Rio de Janeiro (UniverCidade)
- Universidade Veiga de Almeida (UVA)

== Public and private schools ==
- Rio International School
- British School
- CEAT- Centro Educacional Anísio Teixeira
- Centro Federal de Educação Tecnológica Celso Suckow da Fonseca (CEFET) - Federal Center of Technology Education Celso Suckow da Fonseca
- Centro Federal de Educação Tecnológica de Campos (CEFET) - Federal Center of Technology Education at Campos[Located in the nearby city of Campos]
- Centro de Educação e Cultura da Barra (CEC)
- CEFETEQ de Nilópolis - Nilópolis Federal Tecnological Center of Chemistry
- CETIQT - Centro de Tecnologia da Indústria Química e Têxtil
- CEL- Centro Educacional da Lagoa
- Centro Educacional Vieirence
- Colégio Andrews
- Colégio Cruzeiro (Deutsche Schule)
- Colégio de Aplicação da UERJ
- Colégio de Aplicação da UFRJ
- Colégio Estadual Brigadeiro Schorcht
- Colégio Estadual Erich Walter Heine
- Colégio Estadual Júlia Kubitschek
- Colégio Santa Marcelina
- Colégio Maria Raythe
- Colégio Marista São José
- Colégio Nossa Senhora de Lourdes
- Colégio Pedro II
- Colégio Militar do Rio de Janeiro
- Charles Péguy
- Colégio Princesa Isabel
- Colégio dos Santos Anjos
- Colégio Subtente Duplar Pires de Mello (CSDPM)
- Colégio da Imaculada Conceição
- Escola Alemã Corcovado
- Escola Americana do Rio de Janeiro (EARJ) (American School)
- Escola Parque
- EDEM
- FAETEC - Support Foundation of the Technical Schools
- Instituto Analice
- Instituto de Educação Carmela Dutra
- Instituto de Educação Sarah Kubitschek
- Instituto Relvas
- Liceu Franco-Brasileiro
- Liceu Molière - Lyceé Molière
- Liceu Nilo Peçanha
- Military School of Rio de Janeiro
- OLM Our Lady of Mercy School
- Colégio pH
- Sagrado Coração de Maria - Sacre Cóeur de Marie
- Santa Mônica Centro Educacional (SMCE)
- Santo Agostinho - Saint Augustin School
- Santo Ignácio
- São Vicente de Paulo
- São Bento - Saint Benedict School
- Sion
- Teresiano
