= Creative economy (economic system) =

Economic system using creative imagination

A creative economy is based on people's use of their creative imagination to increase an idea's value. John Howkins developed the concept in 2001 to describe economic systems where value is based on novel imaginative qualities rather than the traditional resources of land, labour and capital. Compared to creative industries, which are limited to specific sectors, the term is used to describe creativity throughout a whole economy.

Some observers take the view that creativity is the defining characteristic of developed 21st century economies, just as manufacturing typified 19th and early 20th centuries.

== Definitions of a creative economy ==
Definitions of a modern creative economy continue to evolve. When John Howkins popularized the term “creative economy” in 2001, he applied the term to the arts, cultural goods and services, toys and games, and research and development. The most common models of the creative economy share many elements. Howkins’ creativity-based model includes all kinds of creativity, whether expressed in art or innovation. The narrower culture-based models concentrate on arts, design and media and are normally restricted to nominated industries. The term increasingly refers to all economic activity that depends on a person's individual creativity for its economic value whether the result has a cultural element or not. In this usage, the creative economy occurs wherever individual creativity is the main source of value and the main cause of a transaction.

There are several ways to measure a creative economy. It is possible to use the same indicators as in other economies, such as producer outputs, consumer expenditure, employment and trade. Businesses also use valuation, value chains, price and transactional data. There are additional indicators of intellectual property. However, measuring intangibles such as ideas, design, brands and style presents a challenge. Furthermore, the nature of work is different, with a high proportion of part-time workers and with many transactions being non-financial.

Governments have been slow to adjust their national statistics to capture the new forms of creative occupations, productions and transactions. As a result, national data on employment, GDP and trade is often unreliable. America and the UK are in the process of adjusting their national statistics to measure their creative economies more accurately.

== History ==
The roots of today's creative economy go back to two main themes on the nature of work and especially the relationship between the individual and their work. The first started with the industrial revolution and focussed on urbanisation, information and knowledge, and was developed by economists and management writers. In the second half of the 20th century these ideas were expressed as the Post-Industrial Society, Information Society, Knowledge Society and Network Society. These concepts prioritised data and knowledge over the individual's creation of new ideas and made little reference to an individual's personal creativity or the cultural context.

The second theme was the arts and culture. Europe began to recognise culture's economic elements and to develop the concepts of cultural industries and creative industries in the 1990s. These prioritised culture, design and media. This approach was led by the British Department for Culture, Media and Sport (DCMS) which designated 14 creative industries in 1998, later reduced to 12.

Other developments at the turn of the century include Richard Florida’s creative class and Charles Landry’s creative city. The primary role of individual creativity as the defining source of the new economy was put forward by John Howkins in 2001. He prioritised creativity rather than either information or culture. He defined a creative product as an economic good, service or experience resulting from creativity and with the characteristics of being personal, novel and meaningful. He said its defining characteristics are twofold: it results from creativity and its economic value is based on creativity. Howkins’ second edition of The Creative Economy in 2013 shows an even greater awareness of the importance of creativity and the need to include all economic activity.

Howkins acknowledges that creative economies have been found in many societies over time. ‘Creativity is not new and neither is economics but what is new is the nature of the relationship between them’. He suggests this new relationship reflects increases in higher education, shifts in employment patterns, market liberalisation, higher average wages, more leisure time and increasing urbanisation.

In 2013 the British NESTA criticised the UK government culture-based approach saying, ‘For example, the definition doesn’t include a large (and growing) software segment of the creative industries’. It proposed a new model based on creative intensity. This uses five criteria to measure the extent to which a specific occupation is creative, regardless of whether the worker is in a nominated industry. The criteria include novelty, a resistance to mechanisation and non-repetitiveness.

Creative economies are more commonly found in market-based economies where they can benefit from intellectual and artistic freedom, lack of censorship, access to knowledge, availability of private capital, and the freedom to set market prices and where the population is able to exercise their own choice in terms of what choose to buy or rent. Command economies may allow selected individuals to be creative but cannot sustain a creative economy. The growth of China's economy since 1980 has been stimulated by market-based creativity and innovation. Europe, America, Japan, China and other countries see creativity as the dominant economic force affecting jobs, economic growth and social welfare. The 2014 OECD Forum declared ‘Creativity and innovation are now driving the economy, reshaping entire industries and stimulating inclusive growth’.

== Issues ==
According to Howkins, current issues in the creative economy include Aesthetics, Branding, Business Models (Value Chains), Networks (Systems, Ecologies), Culture (intrinsic and instrumental values), Education and Learning, Intellectual property (proprietorial and open source), Management, Digital and Online, Policy, Pricing, Public statistics (definitions), Software, Start-ups, Tax, Urban design, and Work

The creative economy is mired with exploitative labor practices. In 2023, arts journalist Anna Mikaela Ekstrand detailed non-payment by the Norwegian artist Bjarne Melgaard as told by his former studio manager. In the same year, an article summarized ongoing public arguments between a prominent gallerist and a number of her represented artists for non-payment and withholding artwork. Cultbytes has also covered museum workers organizing to unionize in the United States. This coverage contributes to the growing field of arts journalism that makes visible exploitative art-world labor practices in the United States.

== See also ==
- Content creation
- Content marketing
- Creativity
- Creative Industries
- Creative Class
- Visual Collaborative
- Digital Economies
- Intellectual Property
