= SESI Mathematics =

SESI Mathematics is a project developed by FIRJAN System with the aim of improving the teaching of math for high school students. The program consists of a series of initiatives, from the organization of training courses for teachers and distribution of educational kits, to the providing of physical spaces for students of SESI Rio and SENAI Rio network, as well as for those from selected state schools. Although the project has the pretension of being expanded to other Brazilian states, nowadays it only operates in the states of Rio de Janeiro and Bahia.

== History ==
SESI Mathematics was launched in 2012 by SESI Rio. The program counted on an initial investment of R$ 10 million (Note: The equivalent of US$ 4,525 mi in July 2014.) and was created based on the Lei de Diretrizes e Bases da Educação Nacional (read "Law of Guidelines and Bases of National Education"), motivated by the poor performance of Brazil in national and international reviews, as well as in researches (Note: Related research: "O que falta ao trabalhador brasileiro" (PDF – 243KB).) that indicated a lack of skilled people to work in areas related to the exact sciences, which require mastery of mathematics.

In 2013, an agreement was signed between SESI Bahia and the Government of Bahia State to extend the project to the schools of the state of Bahia. In the same year, the project won the Idea Brasil award in the "Design Strategy" category.

== Methodology ==
The project's initiatives make use of online interactive technologies such as educational games as a way to encourage the teaching of students.

The games are developed by the English company Mangahigh.

== SESI Mathematics House ==
In partnership with the Instituto Nacional de Matemática Pura e Aplicada (read "National Institute for Pure and Applied Mathematics"), one of the initiatives of the project is the construction of a public space dedicated to temporary and permanent exhibitions of themes related to mathematics, among other activities. The space will be located at Barra da Tijuca (Rio de Janeiro, Brasil) and is scheduled to open in 2015.
