= Creative entrepreneurship =

Creative entrepreneurship is the practice of setting up a business – or becoming self-employed - in one of the creative industries. The focus of the creative entrepreneur differs from that of the typical business entrepreneur or, indeed, the social entrepreneur in that they are concerned first and foremost with the creation and exploitation of creative or intellectual capital. Essentially, creative entrepreneurs are investors in talent – their own or other people’s.

The most renowned creative entrepreneurs have combined creative flair with entrepreneurial ability to build multimillion-dollar business empires. Notable examples of creative entrepreneurs include Taylor Swift, Madonna, and Beyoncé, who have combined artistic expression with strategic brand and business development.

== History ==
Although creative entrepreneurs predate the Industrial Revolution – artisan jewelry making dates back to 7000 BCE and there were professional poets (scôps) in Pre-Norman Britain – the subject of creative entrepreneurship is a relatively new area.

Since the mid 20th century, commentators have observed the move towards a knowledge economy or information society where the old rules of manufacturing-based business no longer apply, or at very least need to be reconsidered (Machlup 1962; Drucker, 1969; Lyotard, 1984). But the creative sector, an intrinsic part of the knowledge economy, has received relatively little attention.

In recent years, due to significant economic growth in the sector (prior to the 2008/9 downturn), there has been a surge of interest in the creative industries, and the issue of creative entrepreneurship has been pushed to the fore. In parallel with (and no doubt partially motivated by) general enthusiasm from policymakers and support agencies, creative entrepreneurship has grown as an academic discipline, Creative entrepreneurship courses are becoming widely available, and seem increasingly popular with students.

A new body of work has emerged with writers such as Richard E. Caves, John Howkins, Richard Florida and Chris Bilton all championing the creative industries and addressing the specific skills needed to succeed in them.

In 2001, the Harvard economist and academic, Richard E. Caves, made the following observation:

“The preferences or tastes of creative artists differ in substantial and systematic (if not universal) ways from their counterparts in the rest of the economy where creativity plays a lesser (if seldom negligible) role.”

Caves listed seven basic economic or “bedrock” properties that he believes distinguish creative activities from other sectors of the economy:

- Demand is uncertain
- Creative workers care about their product
- Some creative products require diverse skills
- Differentiated products
- Vertically differentiated skills
- Time is of the essence
- Durable products and durable rents

The body of Caves’ work makes a division between “artists” and “gatekeepers” and focuses on the issue of contracts between the two. In his analysis, it is the “gatekeepers” (art dealers, agents, managers, publishers) who “decide whether the prospective value of [an artist’s] creative output warrants the cost of humdrum inputs needed to place it before final buyers”.

Today, with the onset of Long Tail economics, Caves’ division of labor might be seen as increasingly irrelevant: the artist can take his/her product direct to market via the Internet and is no longer dependent on a third party to negotiate access; thus his/her entrepreneurial and business abilities are ever more crucial.

== Definition ==
The policy consultant and author, John Howkins, observes how the French economist and journalist, Jean-Baptiste Say, coined the term ‘entrepreneur’ in the late Eighteenth Century to describe a person who unlocks capital tied up in land and redirects it. Howkins makes this observation on the creative entrepreneur:

“Entrepreneurs in the creative economy…operate like Say’s original model entrepreneur but with an important difference…they use creativity to unlock the wealth that lies within themselves. Like true capitalists, they believe that this creative wealth, if managed right, will engender more wealth.”.

Howkins goes on to observe that, despite lack of recognition from economists and politicians, and traditional lack of support from society (although this is changing), creative entrepreneurs tend to be bright and to value their independence above all else. The freedom to manage their own time and abilities compensate for the unpredictable nature of their working environment, and irregularity of their income:

“These people instinctively think for themselves, instinctively network, instinctively keep several balls in the air at once. They are the shock troops not only for new ideas about our culture but for new ideas about working in it.”

== Contribution to the economy ==
In 2007, the UK's creative sector was growing twice as fast as the rest of the economy and generally considered to be equally important to the financial sector, which, at the time, was the driving force of the UK's gross domestic product.

Now, as then, the majority of people working in the creative industries tend to be self-employed – either freelance or running their own business. These people have the potential to be a key driver of the creative economy, but few see themselves as ‘creative entrepreneurs’.

Figures show that only a handful of self-employed creatives in the UK have gone on to start a company or employ other people - the US, by contrast, has a relatively high number of business start-ups. (Howkins, 2001)

As Howkins and others (Caves, 2000; Davies, 2007) observes, there has generally been a lack of support for creative entrepreneurship in the UK.

=== Specific skills ===
Creative entrepreneurs need to master specific skills: an understanding of intellectual property is essential, combined with the ability to manage cash flow, key talent, and the creative process effectively.

Howkins (2001) lists 11 rules for successful creative entrepreneurs. These rules include: invent yourself, prioritize ideas over data, be nomadic, learn endlessly and, most importantly, have fun.

== See also ==
- Creative industries
- Entrepreneurship
