= Murilo Félix =

Brazilian politician (born 1988)

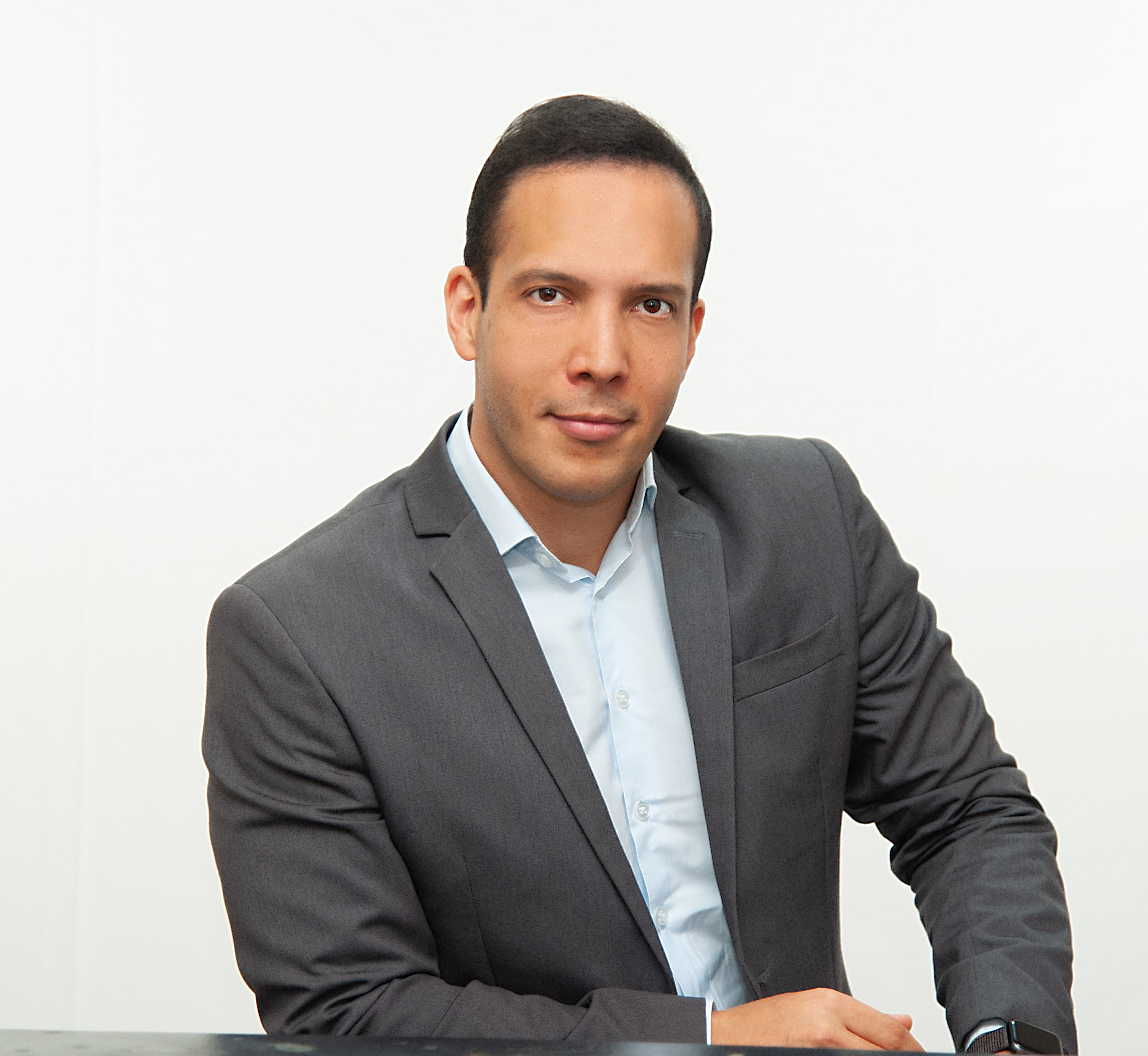
- Félix in 2021

Mayor of Limeira
- Incumbent
- Assumed office 1 January 2025
- Preceded by: Mário Botion

Personal details
- Born: 28 January 1988 (age 38)
- Party: Podemos (since 2018)
- Parents: Sílvio Félix (father); Constância Félix (mother)

Murilo Berbet Avigo Félix (born 28 January 1988) is a Brazilian politician serving as mayor of Limeira since 2025. From 2021 to 2023, he was a member of the Legislative Assembly of São Paulo. He is the son of Sílvio Félix and Constância Félix.
