= Euvaldo Lodi Institute of Rio de Janeiro =

EUVALDO LODI INSTITUTE OF RIO DE JANEIRO
- INSTITUTO EUVALDO LODI DO RIO DE JANEIRO
- Abbreviation: IEL Rio
- Formation: 29 January 1969; 57 years ago
- Type: Non-profit organization
- Purpose: To unite academy, research institutes and industry
- Headquarters: Centro (Rio de Janeiro)
- Location: Rio de Janeiro
- Region served: Rio de Janeiro, Brazil
- Services: Support to Junior Enterprises; Support to Business Incubators; Business performance management; Organizational diagnostics; Entrepreneurship events
- Official language: Brazilian Portuguese
- Affiliations: FIRJAN System
- Website: Firjan.org.br

Euvaldo Lodi Institute of Rio de Janeiro (IEL Rio) is the equivalent of the Brazilian Euvaldo Lodi Institute, created by the National Confederation of Industry along with the Industry Social Service (SESI) and the National Industrial Training Service in 1969. Except it only covers Rio de Janeiro state, instead of all the Brazilian territory.

The main goal of IEL Rio is to unite academy and institutes of science and technology with industry. Amongst its objectives, there are development of entrepreneurship programs in order to promote the creation of new leaderships and the adoption, in the graduation curriculum, of disciplines about the entrepreneurial action.

The politician Euvaldo Lodi and the engineer Roberto Simonsen were honored by industry thanks to their work: while the first one gave its name to IEL, the second one became the name of "a stutides and research institute of the Industry Federation of São Paulo State, which comprehends in its structure the COPS – Superior Council of Political and Social Guidance".
