= Creative industry in Brazil =

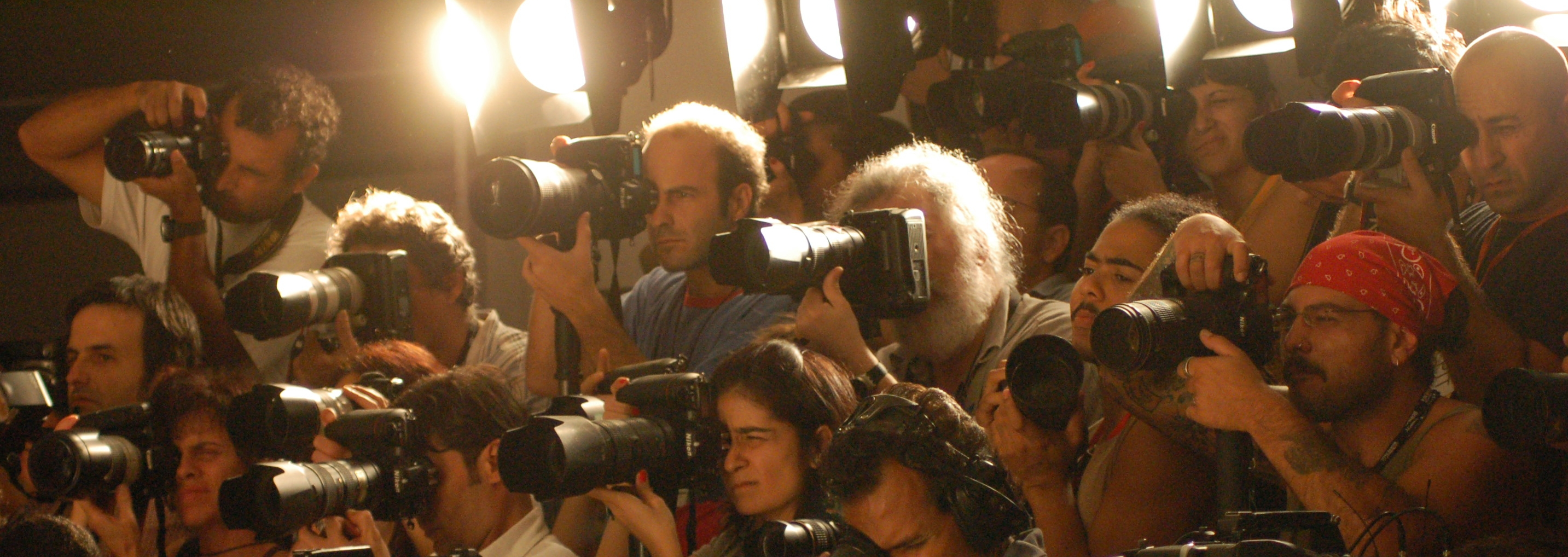
The creative industry includes not only traditional forms of art, but also fashion, marketing, software, and scientific research and other creativity- and knowledge-based fields.

The creative industry in Brazil refers to various economic sectors of Brazil that depend on the talents and creativity to develop. In other words, these economic sectors generate wealth for the region through knowledge, culture and creativity, and contribute to sustainable development (environmental, economic and social). The term 'creative industries' was coined by the United Kingdom in 1990 and, in 2001, was augmented by two important additions: by researcher John Howkins, who applied an entrepreneurial vision when focusing on the transformation of creativity in product; (Note: To do so, he based on "the marketing concepts of intellectual property" applied to trademarks, patents and copyrights.) and professor Richard Florida, whose research focused on the professionals involved in the creative processes of production, and addressed the social aspects and the "potential contribution to the development" of the "creative class".

The first international study emerged in 2008, conducted by the United Nations Conference on Trade and Development (UNCTAD). In the same year, another study by FIRJAN was published, this time concentrating on the economic impact of creativity on Brazil. The creative economy in Latin America has since been referred to as the “Orange Economy” in a publication released by the Inter-American Development Bank (IDB). This 2013 study claimed that Brazil's Orange Economy could be valued at US$66.87 billion providing 5,280,000 jobs. At the time and to provide a comparative value, Venezuelan oil exports amounted to US$62 billion. Brazil's Orange Economy was responsible for US$9,414 million in exports, a figure that is higher than the US$8,016 million value of coffee exports over the same period.

A 2021 study on Intellectual Property Intensive Sectors in the Brazilian Economy was undertaken as part of the National Strategy on Intellectual Property 2021–2030 and the creation of the Intellectual Property website.

== Creative professions ==
The Classificação Brasileira de Ocupações - CBO (read "Brazilian Classification of Occupations") from the Ministry of Labour and Employment lists of all professions in the country (Note: It was last updated on 2002 due to the new classification methodology, as explained on page "CBO - Classificação Brasileira de Ocupações".) and has mapped the creative work market in Brazil. The study isolated fourteen creative professions in which knowledge is a transforming input of production:

1. Architecture and Engineering
2. Art
3. Performing Arts
4. Biotechnology
5. Design
6. Cultural expressions
7. Film & Video
8. Editorial Market
9. Fashion
10. Music
11. Research and development
12. Advertising
13. Software, Computer & Telecom
14. Television & Radio.

== History ==
The first initiative to map the creative industries from any country was from the United Kingdom (Note: The document´s name is “Creative Industries Mapping Documents”, released in 1998 by the Department of Culture, Media and Sport in the UK.) at the end of 1990. The goal was to prove that these sectors have an important role to the culture and the potential to generate jobs and wealth to the country. Then, these creative industries were mapped, and all others who maintained relations with them as well. Thus, it was built a view of the weight of the creative chains in the production process.

Three years after this pioneering work, specifically in 2001, two others arose from:

- Researcher John Howkins, who built his study according to a corporate vision (based on marketing concepts of intellectual property); and
- Teacher Richard Florida, who showed off the so-called "creative class" (professionals who work with creative processes).

It did not take long for the United Nations Conference on Trade and Development (UNCTAD, 2008) to launch another study on the subject, only this time with an international scope. According to the survey, the exports of the creative industries in the world exceeded 500 billion dollars.

Given the importance of the issue to the world and specifically to Brazil, the study A Cadeia da Indústria Criativa no Brasil (read "The Chain of Creative Industry in Brazil"), was undertaken. It was updated in 2011 and published in 2012. This tool to map the creative industry in the country is able to list information about each of these professions, such as the number of jobs and the amount of wages and the education level required. Thus, it unites information from both the Classificação Nacional de Atividades Econômicas (i.e. "National Classification of Economic Activities") and the "Brazilian Classification of Occupations".

In general, the creative industries encompass "economic activity directly related to the art world - especially the visual arts, performing arts, literature and publishing, photography, crafts, libraries, museums, galleries, archives, spots designated by the National Historic Landmark and festivals of arts (...) electronic media and other recent media (...) design-related activities.

The theme is sometimes confused with the term "cultural industry". However, "the scope of the creative economy is determined by the extent of the creative industries." In other words, cultural products and services would be part of a larger category of creative products and services.

== Chain ==
For the United Nations Conference on Trade and Development (UNCTAD), the chain of creative industry comprises the "cycles of creation, production and distribution of goods and services that use creativity and intellectual capital as primary inputs." Thus, it can be divided into three major areas:

1. creative core (the creative economic activities)
2. related activities (provide goods and services directly to the core), and
3. support (provide goods and services indirectly to the core).

The United Kingdom's Department for Culture, Media and Sport considers as creative industries activities "that have their origin in creativity, skill and individual talent and which have a potential for creating wealth and jobs through the generation and exploitation of intellectual property."

Based on this concept, it can be said that Brazil is very important when it comes to creative industry. After all, it is one of the largest producers in the world of creativity. Analyzing the remuneration of the Brazilian people, it was found that the wages of those working in the creative industry in Brazil are almost three times higher than the national average wage (comparison value: R$4,693 and R$1,733, respectively). And among creative professionals, those from Rio de Janeiro, São Paulo and the Federal District receive the best salaries. These are data from the "Creative Industries Mapping", which was based on information from 2011. The study addresses issues such as jobs, wages, average wage per state, number of employees by segment and even from the GDP creative country.

In 2015 the World Intellectual Property Organization (WIPO) assisted in the preparation of over 50 national studies to measure the size of copyright industries around the world.

== Federal Government and the Creative Industries ==
In May 2012, the Brazilian president Dilma Rousseff decreed the creation of the Secretaria da Economia Criativa ("Creative Economy Secretariat"). The goal of SEC is to create, implement and monitor public policy that have the culture as a strategic axis, "prioritizing support and encouragement to professionals and to the micro and small Brazilian creative endeavors."

According to a report from the United Nations, Brazil was not among the top twenty producers in the industry yet, but the initiative of creating the SEC indicated the government's desire to reposition the "culture as development axis of the Brazilian state." To the President of the National Bank for Economic and Social Development (BNDES), Luciano Coutinho, this is a recognition that creative activities are important for the country "in a long-term perspective, having as a goal a more inclusive and sustainable development.

Globally, the countries that have excelled in the industry are China, in the first place, followed by the United States and Germany. Brazil has contributed in the fields of architecture, fashion and design, revealing its creative potential worldwide.

In December, 2021, the National Intellectual Property Strategy was enacted through Decree 10.886/2021. Among the macro objectives of the national strategy is to map the Brazilian creative industry and the action to approximate innovation clusters of the creative industry to intellectual property. Concomitantly, the Brazilian Federal Government also created the portal on intellectual property.

== Brazilian x-ray ==
In 2014, the Creative Economy Secretary of the Ministry of Culture, Cláudia Leitão, claimed that the country was learning to grow in this area, to transform "Brazilian creativity into innovation and innovation into wealth." The creative industry in Brazil gathers, generally, "young, educated and well-paid professionals" that earn 42% above the average wage in the country.

It is difficult to know how much an idea or innovation costs, as they are intangible assets. One way of measuring their impact is to create metrics and to use qualitative and quantitative research. A first study in 2013 identified the general economic data related to the Creative Industry in Brazil, such as:

- Share of GDP: R$110 billion
- Enterprises: 243 thousand
- Professionals: 810 thousand, of which the most numerous are:
1. Architects and engineers: 229 877 employees formal;
2. Programmers information systems: 50,440;
3. Business analysts: 45,324;
4. Research and market analyst: 25,141;
5. Marketing manager: 20,382;
6. Advertising agents: 14,032;
7. Graphic Designer: 17,806;
8. Biologist: 15,182;
9. Manager of research and development: 13,414;
10. Designer of bespoke shoes: 13,068.
- Wages: the best paid creative activities are:
1. Geologists and geophysicals: R$11,385;
2. Directors of TV shows: R$10,753;
3. Actors: R$10,348;
4. Biotechnologists: R$8,701;
5. News room directors: R$7,774;
6. Magazine editors: R$7,594;
7. Architects and engineers: R$7,524;
8. Electrical Engineers, electronics engineers and Computer engineers: R$7,431;
9. Screenwriters: R$7,347;
10. Researchers in general: R$7,102.

In 2019, the Federation of industries of Rio Janeiro (FIRJAN) updated its previous 2017 research and published a national study that mapped the Brazilian creative industries indicating that in 2017 there were 837,200 employees, a decrease of 3,9 in comparison to 2015. It also concluded that the overall remuneration in the creative industries was higher than the Brazilian average.

A 2021 study on Intellectual Property Intensive Sectors in the Brazilian Economy was undertaken as part of the National Strategy on Intellectual Property 2021–2030 and the creation of the Intellectual Property website. The main findings of the study were:

- out of 673 economic classes, 450 were classified as IP-intensive sectors,
- the IP-intensive sectors employed 19,3 million people, and
- the share of GDP between 2014 and 2016 amounted to R$2,1 trillion Reais or 44,2 % of GDP.
