= Sesinho =

Brazilian comic character

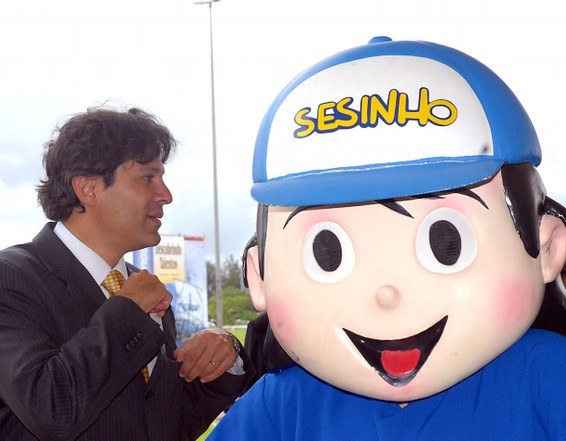
Sesinho and the former minister of education, Fernando Haddad

Sesinho is a popular Brazilian comic character and a mascot of SESI. He is characterized as a seven-year-old boy who is shrewd, smart, adventurous, and part of a gang named Sesinho's Gang. The character was created in 1947, became popular through the 1960s, and recently became known again with the relaunch of the character in 2001. With the success of his magazine, the character was adapted for cartoons and multimedia in the following years.

== Characters ==
Main Characters

- Sesinho: Sesinho is a boy adventurer and a good friend who is the leader of Sesinho's Gang. He is the protagonist in most stories, in the earliest stories was an ingenuous kid, but then became more intelligent and help their friends in personal problems. He has an older sister named Alice, and a pet dog named Amigão. His name comes from SESI, the company responsible for the publication of the magazines.
- Nina: A prodigy girl who is considered the brains of the gang and also the most diligent student in the school. Being the smartest kid of the gang, she usually tends to be the voice of reason warning her friends of things they don't know. In some stories she is also portrayed as a scientist being able to build various gadgets and machines.
- Ruivo: The most distracted and naive member of the gang. Always does things before thinking, often getting into trouble. Ruivo means "redhead" an allusion to the colour of the character's hair.
- Bocão: At first, he was introduced as a antagonistic bully who used to be rude and arrogant towards Sesinho and his friends, despite studying in the same class as them. Over time he became friends with Sesinho and the others, although he occasionally displays his old habits. His name means "big mouth" because of his gluttony and laziness.
- Luiza: A pretty girl who loves to make art. At first, she was just a friend of Sesinho, but after an appeal from her fans, she began to have a slight crush on him.
- David Coperfilho: The aspiring sorcerer of the gang. He has a magic wand that serves to create somewhat useful magic. He is always wearing a wizard's apron.
- Tuta: He is an afro-Brazilian boy and the sportiest member of the group. He often accompanies his friends on their adventures and has a younger brother named Tito.

Other Characters

- Professora Belmira: The female teacher of Sesinho and his friends. Usually appears in episodes related to school helping their students in some personal problems.
- Amigão: Sesinho's pet dog.
- Régis: A poor boy who is Sesinho's friend. He studies at a public school separate from Sesinho and his friends.
- Alice: Sesinho's older sister, being a teenager. Bocão used to have a crush in her in the older stories.
- Rebeca: A tomboy girl that is Bocão's current love interest.
- Clarisse Nai: Another girl that is Sesinho's friend, which name is a reference to SENAI. She came to be part of the main group for a short time in older stories.

== Media ==
=== Comics ===
Cover to Sesinho #01, 2001

The first edition of the Sesinho comic was published in 1947, one year after the creation of SESI. The magazine served as a method to alleviate the sorrow caused earlier in World War II. Shows children's comics of adventure designed by several Brazilian cartoonists. It became quite popular and was sold until 1960, before slowly declining in popularity. In total, there were 154 magazines published.

The character was reintroduced in 2001, this time with a redesign and new characters, when SESI once again began publishing the magazine. Unlike the first version that was sold, this version was freely distributed by business schools. It was so successful that it became popular outside the schools as well. SESI also began producing a series of animated shorts to be displayed on educational channels such as Futura and TV Cultura. The modern magazines have an educational focus, with about half of the pages devoted to a story, and the rest to educational games. The adventures in which the characters get involved are always related to social issues (e.g. health, education, child labor).

=== Animation ===
With the relaunch of the comic series were made some animated shorts for television. The first new series was launched around 2002–2003 by Futura. In 2005, they launched another new series, entitled Sesinho: É Tempo de Aprender (Sesinho: It's Time to Learn), which aired for a few years, the last season being in 2008. In 2009, a new version, entitled Sesinho: Educação, Saúde e Lazer (Sesinho: Education, Health and Recreation) was launched. This series aired on TV Cultura until 2011. The show is no longer being broadcast.

By the time the SESI has not shown interest in adapting the stories of the comics or make a larger series.
