= Gazeta de Limeira =

- Type: Daily newspaper
- Format: Broadsheet
- Owner: Roberto Lucato
- Founder(s): Mário Sampaio Martins; J.Vitorino; Álvaro Corrêa
- Founded: 1931
- Language: portuguese
- Headquarters: Rua Senador Vergueiro, 319; Centro – Limeira – SP
- Circulation: daily
- Website: www.gazetadelimeira.com.br

Gazeta de Limeira, (The Gazette of Limeira), is a Brazilian daily newspaper founded and continuously published in Limeira since 1931.

== History ==
The Gazeta de Limeira is a newspaper that circulates daily in Limeira. It was founded in 1931 to defend the Constitutionalist Party (PC) during the Getúlio Vargas presidency, to support the ideas that culminated in the Revolution of 1930. The first cover of the newspaper showed the visit in Limeira of General Isidoro Dias Lopes and the Lieutenants Miguel Costa and João Alberto, who had as supporters well-known local politicians, such as Maria Thereza de Camargo Barros and Octavio Castello Branco. Among the founders of the newspaper there also are Mário Martins Sampaio, J. Vitorino and Álvaro Correa, who was the first director.
