= Creative industries =

Economic sector

The creative industries are economic activities focused on the generation or exploitation of knowledge and information. They may variously also be referred to as the cultural industries (especially in Europe), creative economy, and most recently they have been denominated as the orange economy in Latin America and the Caribbean.

John Howkins's concept of "creative economy" encompasses a wide range of sectors, including advertising, architecture, art, crafts, design, fashion, film, music, performing arts, publishing, R&D, software development, toys and games, TV and radio, and video games. Some scholars consider that the education industry, including public and private services, to be part of the creative industries. Therefore, there are different definitions of the sector. In recent years, the delegation from UNESCO want add to Protection of cultural heritage in register.

The creative industries have been seen to become increasingly important to economic well-being, proponents suggesting that "human creativity is the ultimate economic resource", and that "the industries of the twenty-first century will depend increasingly on the generation of knowledge through creativity and innovation".

== Definitions ==
Various commentators have provided varying suggestions on what activities to include in the concept of "creative industries", and the name itself has become a contested issue – with significant differences and overlap between the terms "creative industries", "cultural industries" and "creative economy" l.

Lash and Urry suggest that each of the creative industries has an "irreducible core" concerned with "the exchange of finance for rights in intellectual property". This echoes the UK Government Department for Culture, Media and Sport (DCMS) definition which describes the creative industries as:

"those industries which have their origin in individual creativity, skill and talent and which have a potential for wealth and job creation through the generation and exploitation of intellectual property"

As of 2015 the DCMS definition recognizes nine creative sectors, namely:

- Advertising and marketing
- Architecture
- Crafts
- Design: product, graphic and fashion design
- Film, TV productions, TV, video, radio and photography
- IT, software and computer services
- Publishing
- Museums, galleries and libraries
- Music, performing and visual arts

To this list Howkins would add toys and games, also including the much broader area of research and development in science and technology. It has also been argued that gastronomy belongs in such a list.

The various fields of engineering do not appear on this list, that emerged from the DCMS reports. This was due, probably, to the fact that engineers occupy relevant positions in "non-cultural" corporations, performing activities of project, management, operation, maintenance, risk analysis and supervision, among others. However, historically and presently, several tasks of engineers can be regarded as highly creative, inventive and innovative. The contribution of engineering is represented by new products, processes and services.

Hesmondhalgh reduces the list to what he terms "the core cultural industries" of advertising and marketing, broadcasting, film, internet and music industries, print and electronic publishing, and video and computer games. His definition only includes those industries that create "texts"' or "cultural artefacts" and which engage in some form of industrial reproduction.

The DCMS list has proven influential, and many other nations have formally adopted it. It has also been criticised. It has been argued that the division into sectors obscures a divide between lifestyle business, non-profits, and larger businesses, and between those who receive state subsidies (e.g., film) and those who do not (e.g., computer games). The inclusion of the antiques trade often comes into question, since it does not generally involve production (except of reproductions and fakes). The inclusion of all computer services has also been questioned.

Some areas, such as Hong Kong, have preferred to shape their policy around a tighter focus on copyright ownership in the value chain. They adopt the WIPO's classifications, which divide up the creative industries according to who owns the copyrights at various stages during the production and distribution of creative content.

The Inter-American Development Bank (IDB) has denominated them for Latin America and the Caribbean as the Orange Economy which is defined as the "group of linked activities through which ideas are transformed into cultural goods and services whose value is determined by intellectual property."

Others have suggested a distinction between those industries that are open to mass production and distribution (film and video; videogames; broadcasting; publishing), and those that are primarily craft-based and are meant to be consumed in a particular place and moment (visual arts; performing arts; cultural heritage).

== How creative workers are counted ==
The DCMS classifies enterprises and occupations as creative according to what the enterprise primarily produces, and what the worker primarily does. Thus, a company which produces records would be classified as belonging to the music industrial sector, and a worker who plays piano would be classified as a musician.

The primary purpose of this is to quantify – for example it can be used to count the number of firms, and the number of workers, creatively employed in any given location, and hence to identify places with particularly high concentrations of creative activities.

It leads to some complications which are not immediately obvious. For example, a security guard working for a music company would be classified as a creative employee, although not as creatively occupied.

The total number of creative employees is then calculated as the sum of:

- All workers employed in creative industries, whether or not creatively occupied (e.g. all musicians, security guards, cleaners, accountants, managers, etc. working for a record company)
- All workers that are creatively occupied, and are not employed in creative industries (for example, a piano teacher in a school). This includes people whose second job is creative, for example somebody who does weekend gigs, writes books, or produces artwork in their spare time

== Properties or characteristics ==
According to Richard E. Caves, creative industries are characterized by seven economic properties:

1. Nobody knows principle: Demand uncertainty exists because the consumers' reaction to a product are neither known beforehand, nor easily understood afterward.
2. Art for art's sake: Workers care about originality, technical professional skill, harmony, etc. of creative goods and are willing to settle for lower wages than offered by 'humdrum' jobs.
3. Motley crew principle: For relatively complex creative products (e.g., films), the production requires diversely skilled inputs. Each skilled input must be present and perform at some minimum level to produce a valuable outcome.
4. Infinite variety: Products are differentiated by quality and uniqueness; each product is a distinct combination of inputs leading to infinite variety options (e.g., works of creative writing, whether poetry, novel, screenplays or otherwise).
5. A list/B list: Skills are vertically differentiated. Artists are ranked on their skills, originality, and proficiency in creative processes and/or products. Small differences in skills and talent may yield huge differences in (financial) success.
6. Time flies: When coordinating complex projects with diversely skilled inputs, time is of the essence.
7. Ars longa: Some creative products have durability aspects that invoke copyright protection, allowing a creator or performer to collect rents.

The properties described by Caves have been criticized for being too rigid (Towse, 2000). Not all creative workers are purely driven by 'art for art's sake'. The 'ars longa' property also holds for certain noncreative products (i.e., licensed products). The 'time flies' property also holds for large construction projects. Creative industries are therefore not unique, but they score generally higher on these properties relative to non-creative industries.

== Difference from the 'cultural industries' ==
There is often a question about the boundaries between creative industries and the similar term of cultural industries. Cultural industries are best described as an adjunct-sector of the creative industries. Cultural industries include industries that focus on cultural tourism and heritage, museums and libraries, sports and outdoor activities, and a variety of 'way of life' activities that arguably range from local pet shows to a host of hobbyist concerns. Thus cultural industries are more concerned about delivering other kinds of value—including cultural wealth and social wealth—rather than primarily providing monetary value. (See also cultural institutions studies.)

== The creative class ==
Richard Florida, an American urban studies theorist, posited a shift in focus from tangible goods to the products of knowledge workers, categorizing the 'creative class' (a term coined by Florida) as encompassing nearly all service providers offering professional, knowledge-based services.

=== The creative class and diversity ===
Florida's focus on the creative workforce has led him to pay particular attention to its nature and composition. In a study the factors that contribute to the appeal of specific US cities, such as San Francisco, to creative producers, Florida argues that a high proportion of the workforce belonging to the 'creative class' plays a key role in creative production, which enterprises actively seek to engage. He sought to quantitatively establish the importance of diversity and multiculturalism in the cities concerned, for example the existence of a significant public gay community, ethnic and religious diversity, and tolerance.

== Economic contribution ==
Globally, Creative Industries excluding software and general scientific research and development are said to have accounted for around 4% of the world's economic output in 1999, which is the last year for which comprehensive collated figures are currently available. Estimates of the output corresponding to scientific Research and Development suggest that an additional 4-9% might be attributable to the sector if its definition is extended to include such activities, though the figures vary significantly between different countries.

In 2015, the World Intellectual Property Organization (WIPO) assisted in the preparation of national studies that measured the size of over 50 copyright industries around the world. Findings from the recompilation of these studies indicate that the GDP contribution to national economies varies between 2% and 11%.

Taking the UK as an example, in the context of other sectors, the creative industries make a far more significant contribution to output than hospitality or utilities and deliver four times the output due to agriculture, fisheries and forestry. In terms of employment and depending on the definition of activities included, the sector is a major employer of between 4-6% of the UK's working population, though this is still significantly less than employment due to traditional areas of work such as retail and manufacturing.

Within the creative industries sector, and again taking the UK as an example, the three largest sub-sectors are design, publishing, and television and radio. Together these account for around 75% of revenues and 50% of employment.

In economies like Brazil, for example, a 2021 study into the Intellectual Property intensive sectors in the Brazilian economy found that 450 of Brazil's 673 economic classes could be classified as IP-intensive sectors which collectively employed 19,3 million people. The Brazilian creative industry's collective share of GDP between 2014 and 2016, when calculated across these 450 economic classes, totaled R$2,1 trillion Reais or 44,2% of Brazil's GDP.

The complex supply chains in the creative industries sometimes make it challenging to calculate accurate figures for the gross value added by each sub-sector. This is particularly the case for the service-focused sub-sectors such as advertising, whereas it is more straightforward in product-focused sub-sectors such as crafts.

There may be a tendency for publicly funded creative industries development services to inaccurately estimate the number of creative businesses during the mapping process. There is also imprecision in nearly all tax code systems that determine a person's profession, since many creative people operate simultaneously in multiple roles and jobs. Both these factors mean that official statistics relating to the Creative Industries should be treated with caution.

The creative industries in Europe make a significant contribution to the EU economy, creating about 3% of EU GDP – corresponding to an annual market value of billion – and employing about 6 million people. In addition, the sector plays a crucial role in fostering innovation, in particular for devices and networks. The EU records the second highest TV viewing figures globally, producing more films than any other region in the world. In that respect, the newly proposed 'Creative Europe' programme (July 2011) will help preserve cultural heritage while increasing the circulation of creative works inside and outside the EU. The programme will play a consequential role in stimulating cross border co-operation, promoting peer learning and making these sectors more professional. The Commission will then propose a financial instrument run by the European Investment Bank to provide debt and equity finance for cultural and creative industries. The role of the non-state actors within the governance regarding Medias will not be neglected anymore. Therefore, building a new approach extolling the crucial importance of a European level playing field industry may boost the adoption of policies aimed at developing a conducive environment, enabling European companies as well as citizens to use their imagination and creativity – both sources of innovation -, and therefore of competitiveness and sustainability. It supposes to tailor the regulatory and institutional frameworks in supporting private-public collaboration, in particular in the Medias sector. The EU therefore plans to develop clusters, financing instruments as well as foresight activities to support this sector. The European Commission wishes to assist European creators and audiovisual enterprises to develop new markets through the use of digital technology, and asks how policy-making can best help achieve this. A more entrepreneurial culture will have to take hold with a more positive attitude towards risk-taking, and a capacity to innovate anticipating future trends. Creativity plays an important role in human resource management as artists and creative professionals can think laterally. Moreover, new jobs requiring new skills created in the post-crisis economy should be supported by labour mobility to ensure that people are employed wherever their skills are needed.

=== In the US ===
In the introduction to a 2013 special issue of Work and Occupations on artists in the US workforce, the guest editors argue that by examining the work lives of artists, one can identify characteristics and actions that help both individual workers and policy makers adapt to changing economic conditions. Elizabeth Lingo and Steven Tepper cite multiple sources to suggest artists' skill sets allow them to "work beyond existing markets and create entirely new opportunities for themselves and others". Specifically, Lingo and Tepper suggest artistic workers are "catalysts of change and innovation" because they "face special challenges managing ambiguity, developing and sustaining a relative identity, and forming community in the context of an individually based enterprise economy" (2013). Because of these adaptive skills, the suggestion is that "studying how artists cope with uncertainty and the factors that influence their success should be relevant for understanding these broader social and economic trends facing today's (and tomorrow's) workforce."

This view of artist-as-change-agent changes the questions researchers ask of creative economies. Old research questions would focus on topics like "skills, work practices, contracts, wage differentials, employment incentives, formal credentials, employment pipelines, and labor flows of differentiated occupational categories". Examples of new questions include:

1. How do artists both create changes in the labor market itself and the way cultural work is done?
2. What is their process of innovation and enterprise?
3. What is the nature of their work and the resources they draw upon?
4. How do different network structures produce different opportunity spaces?
5. How do artistic workers create and manage planned serendipity—the spaces and exchanges that produce unexpected collaborations and opportunities?
6. How do creative workers broker and synthesize across occupational, genre, geographic, and industry boundaries to create new possibilities? (Tepper & Lingo, 2013)

== Wider role ==
As some first world countries struggle to compete in traditional markets such as manufacturing, many now see the creative industry as a key component in a new knowledge economy, capable perhaps of delivering urban regeneration, often through initiatives linked to exploitation of cultural heritage that leads to increased tourism. It is often argued that, in future, the ideas and imagination of countries like the United Kingdom will be their greatest asset; in support of this argument, a number of universities in the UK have started to offer creative entrepreneurship as a specific area for study and research. Indeed, UK government figures reveal that the UK's creative industries account for over a million jobs and brought in billion to the UK economy (DCMS Creative Industries Mapping Document 2001), although the data sets underlying these figures are open to question.

In recent years, creative industries have become 'increasingly attractive to governments outside the developed world'. In 2005, the United Nations Conference on Trade and Development (UNCTAD) XI High Level Panel on Creative Industries and Development commissioned several studies to identify challenges and opportunities facing the growth and development of creative industries in developing industries. As Cunningham et al. (2009) put it, 'the harnessing of creativity brings with it the potential of new wealth creation, the cultivation of local talent and the generation of creative capital, the development of new export markets, significant multiplier effects throughout the broader economy, the utilisation of information communication technologies and enhanced competitiveness in an increasingly global economy'. A key driver of interest in creative industries and development is the acknowledgement that the value of creative production resides in ideas and individual creativity, and developing countries have rich cultural traditions and pools of creative talent which lay a basic foundation for creative enterprises. Reflecting the growing interest in the potential of creative industries in developing countries, in October 2011 a Ministry of Tourism and Creative Economy was created within the Indonesian government with well-known economist Mari Pangestu appointed as the first minister to hold the position.

== See also ==
- Cognitive-cultural economy
- Creative industry in Brazil
- Creative work
- Cultural industry
- Entertainment industry
- Imagination age, a theoretical incipient period in which creativity and imagination will become the primary creators of economic value
- Publishing industry
- Smart city
- Creative services
