= Santa Cruz da Conceição =

- Municipality
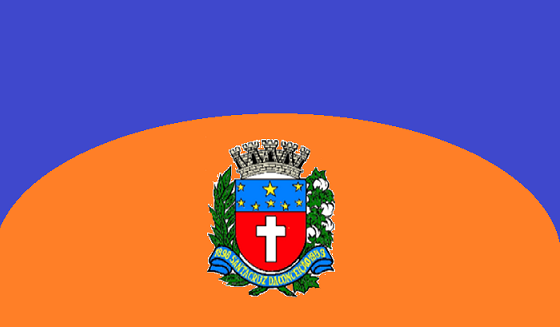
- Flag

- Location in Brazil
- Coordinates: 22°08′25″S 47°27′07″W
- Country: Brazil
- Region: Southeast
- State: São Paulo
- Mesoregion: Piracicaba
- Microregion: Limeira

Area
  - Total: 149.87 km^{2} (57.87 sq mi)
- Elevation: 645 m (2,116 ft)

Population (2020)
  - Total: 4,544
  - Density: 30.32/km^{2} (78.53/sq mi)
- Website: santacruzdaconceicao.sp.gov.br

Santa Cruz da Conceição is a municipality in the state of São Paulo in Brazil. The population in 2020 was 4,544 and the area is 149.87 km^{2} (57.87 sq mi). The elevation is 645 m.

== Media ==
In telecommunications, the city was served by Telecomunicações de São Paulo. In July 1998, this company was acquired by Telefónica, which adopted the Vivo brand in 2012. The company is currently an operator of cell phones, fixed lines, internet (fiber optics/4G) and television (satellite and cable).

== Religion ==
Christianity is present in the city as follows:

=== Catholic Church ===
The Catholic church in the municipality is part of the Roman Catholic Diocese of Limeira.

=== Protestant Church ===
The most diverse evangelical beliefs are present in the city, mainly Pentecostal, including the Assemblies of God in Brazil (the largest evangelical church in the country), Christian Congregation in Brazil, among others. These denominations are growing more and more throughout Brazil.

== See also ==
- List of municipalities in São Paulo
