= Industrial Social Services =

Brazilian nonprofit institution

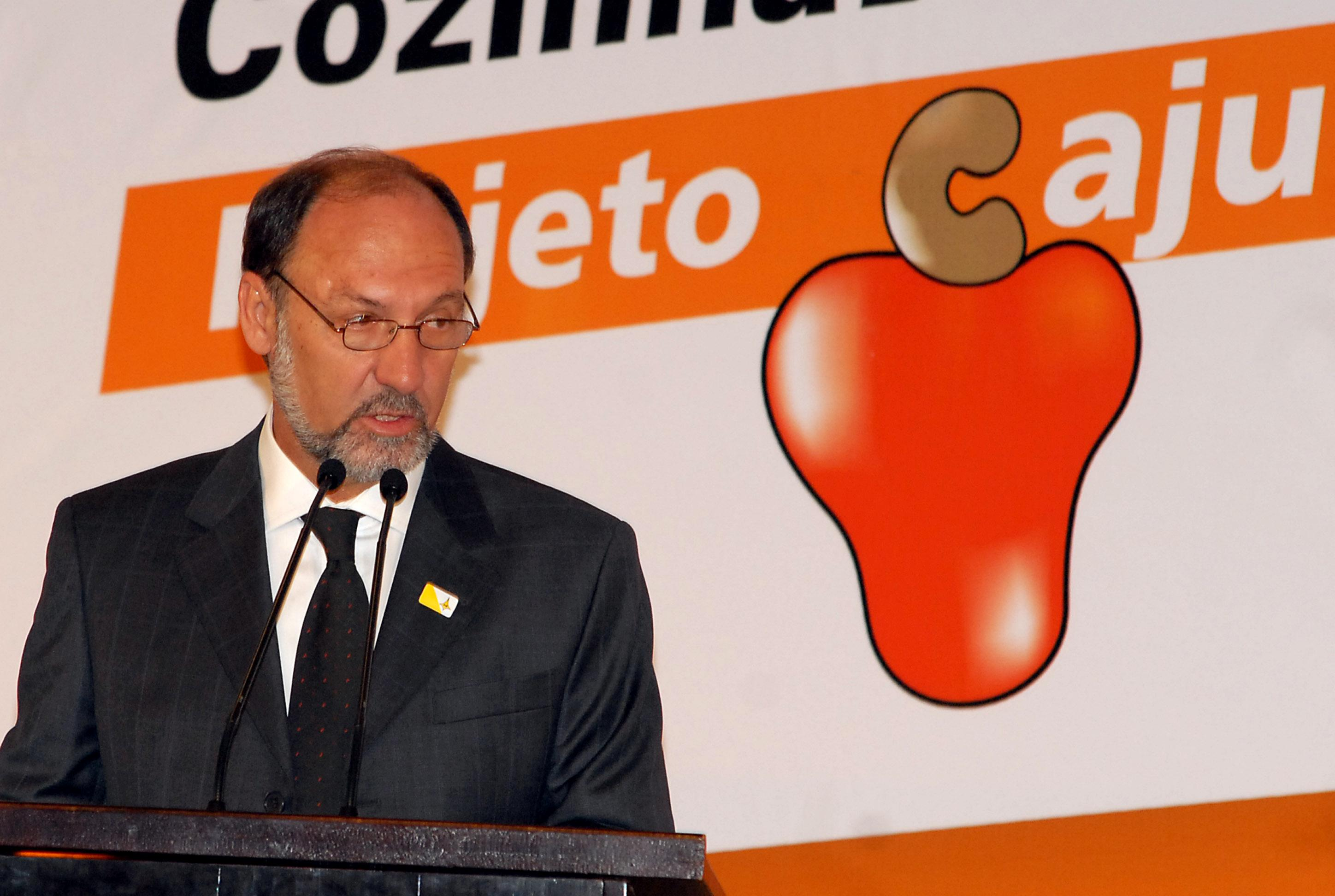
The president of the National Council of SESI, Jair Meneguelli, speaks during the launch of Project Caju in 2007.

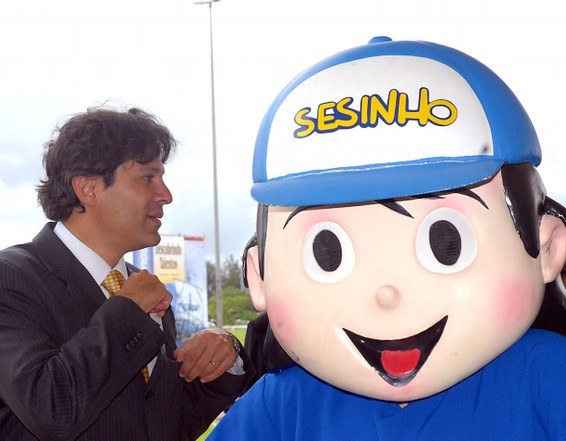
Education Minister Fernando Haddad, next to the symbol of the project, Sesinho

The Brazilian Industrial Social Services (Serviço Social da Indústria, SESI in Portuguese) is a private Brazilian not-for-profit institution that operates throughout the country. It was set up on July 1, 1946 stating its aim to be "promoting education, social welfare, health and cultural development to improve the lives of workers, their families and the communities they live in".

Paulo Freire worked in SESI in Pernambuco from 1947 to 1958. During that time in SESI he served first as Director of the Division of Public Relations, Education, and Culture, and then as superintendent.

== Role ==
The roles of SESI and the National Industrial Apprenticeships Association(SENAI) were set out in Acts 4.048, of 22 January 1942, 4.936, of 7 November 1942, 6.246, of 5 February 1944 and 9.403, of 25 June 1946. According to those bills, the roles referred to are owed by industrial establishments classified as such by the National Confederation of Industry (CNI), along the lines that they are required to pay a monthly contribution for the funding of social work among industrial workers and their dependents for the setting up and maintenance of training schools.

== Regional departments ==
SESI maintains a presence in every state in Brazil and in the Federal District of Brasília through a chain of regional departments, each of which has jurisdiction and technical, financial and administrative autonomy. Its function is the delivery of social services in the areas of health, education, leisure, culture, food and the promotion of citizenship, having in mind improvements in quality of life among industrial workers and their families. Besides providing services in their activity centres and operational units, the regional departments develops operations within industry and in harmony with the needs and expectations of the workers. Various projects also benefit the community through partnerships and agreements with international and national governmental and private institutions.

== Áreas de Atuação ==
=== Education ===
SESI is the largest non-governmental basic education network in Brazil, with more than 300 thousand students in 450 schools. Its educational approach aims at social and economic development through an innovative teaching system focused on the holistic formation of students.

SESI seeks to prepare students both for exercising citizenship and for the world of work, emphasizing skills and competencies aligned with 21st-century demands, including the following offerings:

- Kindergarten
- Elementary School
- High School
- Youth and Adult Education
- Life Long Learning
- Teacher Training

Basic Education at SESI – Social Service of Industry

SESI Schools stand out for an educational model geared toward innovation, technology, and interdisciplinarity. These schools follow a curriculum based on the competencies and skills of the Brazilian National Common Core (BNCC), focusing on active and inquiry-based learning. The goal is to foster student agency by encouraging them to solve problems, work in teams, develop autonomy, and apply the knowledge they acquire in practical and contextual situations.

In addition, these institutions promote the development of socio-emotional skills such as teamwork, resilience, communication, creativity, and problem-solving. SESI Schools use technological resources like digital platforms, science and robotics labs, and maker methodologies, aiming to build learning environments that respond to contemporary demands and the transformations in the world of work.

=== Objectives ===
SESI aims to create an excellent education model aligned with the future of work and grounded in a pedagogical approach suited to the new generations. The specific objectives include:

1. Development of a Proprietary Teaching System: Focused on digital, adaptive, and collaborative education that integrates assessments, teaching materials, and innovative pedagogical plans, promoting quality education for the SESI network and available for other school networks.
2. Teacher Training Offering training and postgraduate programs for professionals in the SESI Network and other school networks, aiming at professional development and improving the quality of education through the SESI Center for Education Training.
3. Strengthening School Management: Implementing best practices in school management by training principals, certifying schools, and using quality indicators and scientific evidence for planning and strategic decision-making.
4. Technological Innovation in Teaching: Developing and providing educational technologies that enhance learning and promote student agency.

== Cultural Development ==
Theatre

- Osmar Rodrigues Cruz, theatre director, founded the SESI Popular Theatre Company in 1963 and presented the play 'Murderous City' (Cidade Assessina) which took Brazilian theatre by storm.
- Tickets were distributed for free, but because of big interest, they were limited.
- Osmar wanted to offer a quality theater, helping to train disadvantaged sections of the public.

Museums

- SESI Lab is an interactive museum in Brasília, developed by SESI and inspired by the renowned Exploratorium. Inaugurated on November 30, 2022, it occupies a building originally designed by Oscar Niemeyer and protected as a heritage site by IPHAN. With a multidisciplinary, creative, and innovative educational approach, the museum offers five exhibition galleries, a massive 84 m^{2} LED panel, over 100 interactive experiments, maker and biomaker workshops, and numerous cultural activities throughout the year. This revitalized space, surrounded by 33,000 square meters of green area, aims to engage diverse audiences and further enrich Brasília's cultural landscape.
- Casa FIRJAN, located in Rio de Janeiro.

== See also ==
- Serviço Nacional de Aprendizagem Industrial (SENAI)
