= Instituto Superior de Tecnologia em Ciências da Computação do Rio de Janeiro =

- Type: Public
- Established: March 18, 2002
- Rector: Márcio Francisco Campos
- Undergraduates: 300 - 350
- Location: Rio de Janeiro, Rio de Janeiro, Brazil; 22.8935°S 43.3261°W
- Campus: Urban, Rua Clarimundo de Melo
- Website: Official website

The Instituto Superior de Tecnologia em Ciências da Computação do Rio de Janeiro (Superior Institute of Technology in Computer Science of Rio de Janeiro - IST-Rio) is a technological university maintained by the FAETEC. IST-Rio is one of the newest and innovative universities of technology of Brazil, using new teaching methodology determined "Escola Mandala" associated with the use of material from the latest technologies. As a result, the IST-Rio won the eighth best rating (IGC) of Brazil in ENADE in 2008, when we evaluated courses in computing, being still second in the state of Rio de Janeiro, only behind the IME.

== See also ==
- Brazil University Rankings
- Universities and Higher Education in Brazil
