= Economy of Rio de Janeiro =

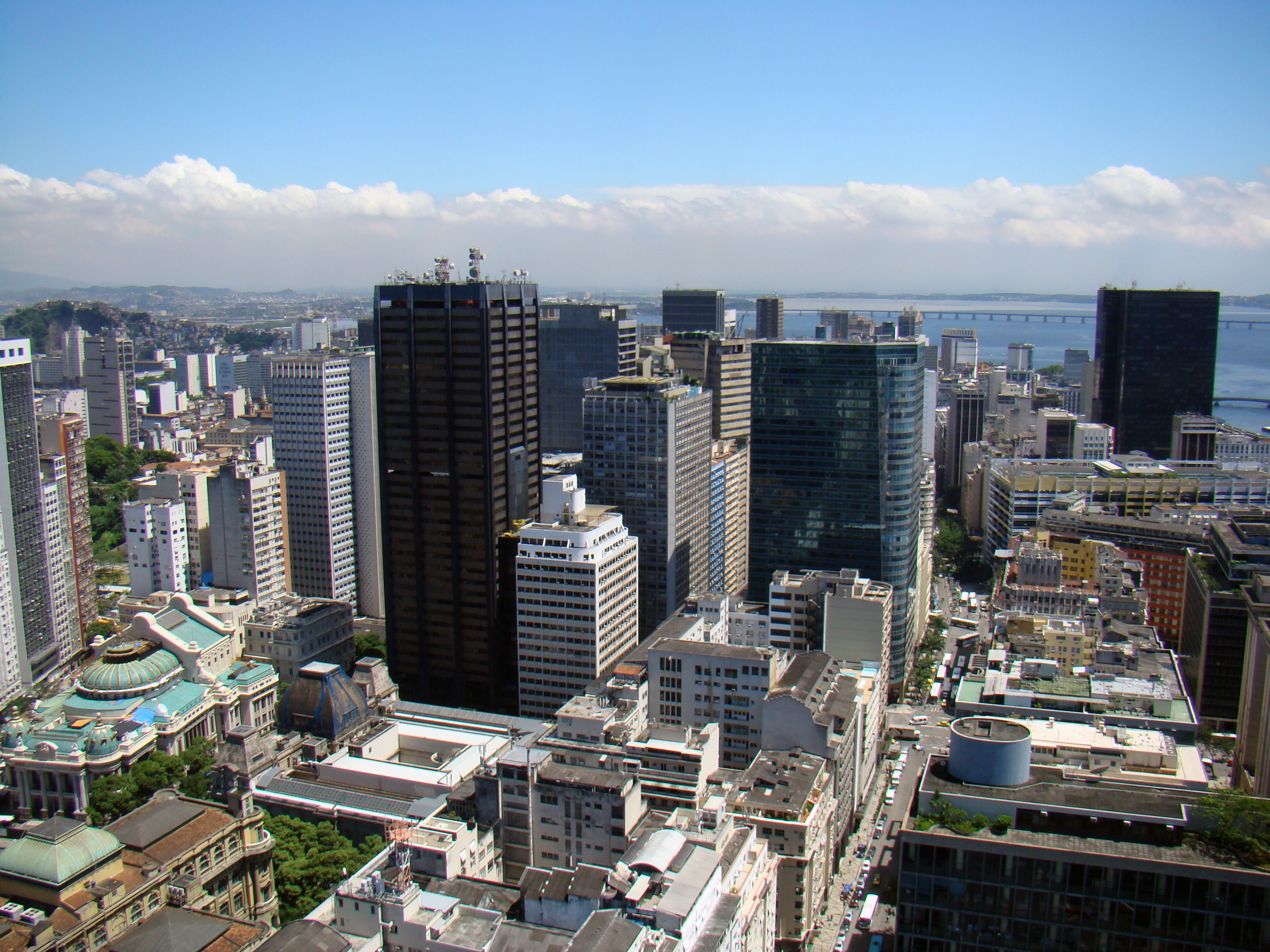
Partial view of the financial center of Rio de Janeiro

The economy of the city of Rio de Janeiro is the 2nd largest regional economy and financial center in Brazil, both one of the largest in Latin America and one of the fastest growing in the world.

In 2017, the city's GDP was estimated at US$105 billion (approximately R$407 billion), or 7% of the country's purchasing power parity (and the 75% of State of Rio de Janeiro's economy), making Rio de Janeiro the fourth richest city in Latin America, behind only Mexico City, São Paulo and Buenos Aires, as well as the 30th largest metropolitan area GDP in the world – ahead of cities such as Rome, Barcelona, and Beijing.

Economic distribution
Industry	11.60%
Tax	23.38%
Services	65.52%

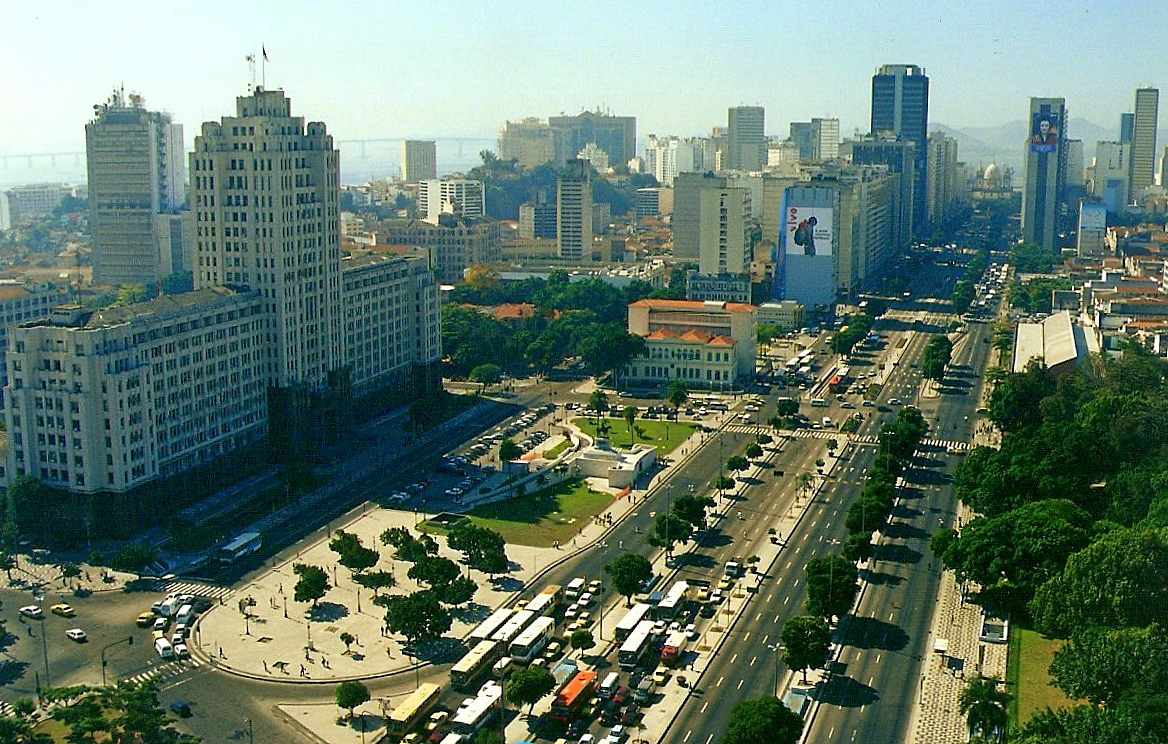
The Avenida Presidente Vargas in Downtown Rio, one of the main business districts of the city
