= National Industrial Training Service of the State of Rio de Janeiro =

- SERVIÇO NACIONAL DE APRENDIZAGEM INDUSTRIAL DO ESTADO DO RIO DE JANEIRO
- Abbreviation: SENAI Rio
- Formation: 1943; 83 years ago
- Type: Non-profit organization
- Purpose: To supply the demand for employees with higher training and ability to innovate in processes and products
- Headquarters: Centro (Rio de Janeiro) and Tijuca
- Location: Rio de Janeiro
- Region served: Rio de Janeiro (state), Brazil
- Services: Vocational education for industry workers; Technological innovation in industry
- Official language: Brazilian Portuguese
- Affiliations: FIRJAN System

The National Industrial Training Service of the State of Rio de Janeiro is SENAI's institution that serves the state. The organization works with vocational education (industry workers' qualification and specialization) and technological innovation in the industry (through technical assistance) of Rio de Janeiro state. It promotes the technology training of industry professionals with focus on professional practice, seeking to supply the demand for employees with higher training and ability to innovate in processes and products.

== Areas of vocational education ==
The entity operates in several educational fronts, including: courses, technology centers, university and mobile units.

The areas that concern the so-called "creative industries" are covered in the courses of two Rio de Janeiro's units: SENAI Maracanã (audiovisual, computer animation, printing office, design, web and information technology) and SENAI Laranjeiras (audiovisual, computer animation and information technology).

== SENAI’s history ==
It is possible to say that the idea of creating a school dedicated to the Brazilian industry in appeared in 1865, when "Sain recommended the creation of the first Industrial School in Brazil, which would work at the expense of this Company and that, after being established in 1870, was a precursor of the National Industrial Training Service of the State of Rio de Janeiro (SENAI), which would set in almost a century later."

In 1939 it was assembled a committee to study the feasibility of a qualification system. The study generated a report, subject of debate between the government and businessmen of the time. In 1941, Euvaldo Lodi and Roberto Simonsen managed the then President Getúlio Vargas granted companies the responsibility to create an entity of industrial education: "Soon after, in January 1942, Getúlio Vargas decreed the creation of SENAI. (Note: This is the Decreto Lei n^{o} 4,048 of 22 January 1942)

It was established that the SENAI, born under the name of National Service of Industrialists' Training, would be maintained through contributions from industry employers. (Note: Earlier, SENAI was maintained with the "monthly collection of 2000 reis per employee of the affiliated companies to the National Confederation of Industry. This system was amended on 5 February 1944, when the collection corresponded to 1% of the industries’ total payroll", according to the book “Histórias e percursos – O departamento nacional do SENAI (1942-2002)". For more information on this, read the Decree Law No. 6.246/1944.) Its scope was broadened to the "transport, communication and fishing sectors, which, conserving the acronym, was renamed the National Industrial Training Service of the State of Rio de Janeiro, by Decree law in 4936, of 7 November 1942".
