= John Howkins =

Author and speaker of Creative Industries

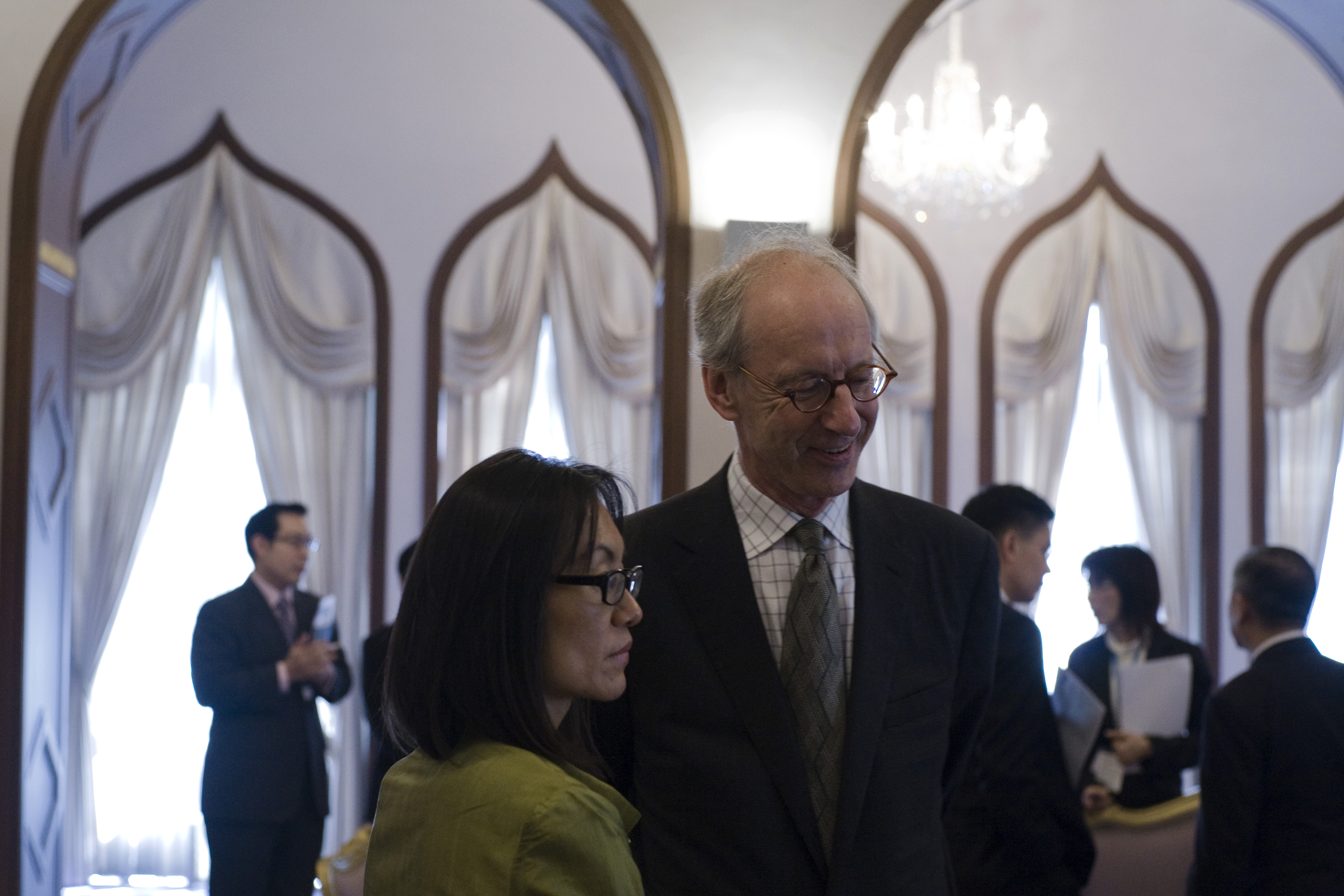

Personal details
- Born: 3 August 1945 (age 81)
- Website: www.johnhowkins.com

John Anthony Howkins (born 3 August 1945) is a British author and speaker on Creative Industries, particularly the development of this economic sector in China. He is the visiting professor of University of Lincoln, England, and vice dean and the visiting professor of Shanghai School of Creativity, Shanghai Theater Academy, China.

== Education ==
Howkins was awarded a BA in International Relations at Keele University and a Diploma in Urban Design at the Architectural Association School of Architecture.

== Career ==
Howkins' media career spans TV, film, digital media, publishing and consulting with companies including HandMade plc, Hotbed Media, HBO and, from 1982 to 1996, Time Warner. He is a former chairman of the London Film School and is a former executive director of the International Institute of Communications, an independent, non-profit membership organization that focusses on critical policy and regulatory issues in the telecom and media. He was executive director of the International Institute of Communications, with members in over 100 countries, from 1985 to 1990. He was the Conference Coordinator of the European Audiovisual Conference, co-hosted by the European Commission and the UK Government, in 1998.

In 2006 he became chairman of the John Howkins Research Centre on the Creative Economy, launched by the Shanghai Municipal Government at the Shanghai School of Creativity, Shanghai Theatre Academy. He is an adviser to the Shanghai Creative Industries Association and the Shanghai Creative Industry Centre. Since 2007 he has chaired BOP Consulting, an independent research and strategy consultancy who maximise the potential of culture, media and creativity, in parallel with his independent consulting work.

He also worked as a journalist for many years on Frendz, Time Out, The Sunday Times, Harpers & Queen and The Economist. He was editor of InterMediate, Vision (the BAFTA journal) and The National Electronics Review.

He has a BA in International Relations (Keele University) and a AA (Dip) and MA in Urban Design (Architectural Association).

== Books ==
- Understanding Television, Sundial Books (1976) ISBN 978-0-904230-01-7
- Communications in China, Prentice Hall Press (5 July 1982) ISBN 978-0-582-28264-3
- New Technologies, New Policies, BFI Publishing (17 June 1982) ISBN 978-0-85170-128-8
- The Creative Economy: How People Make Money from Ideas, Penguin Global (1 June 2002) ISBN 978-0-14-028794-3
- Creative Ecologies: Where Thinking is a Proper Job, Transaction Publishers (1 April 2010) ISBN 978-1-4128-1428-7

== The Creative Economy: How People Make Money From Ideas ==
The original, essential book on the creative economy, first published in 2001 and updated in 2007 and 2013. Covers the nature of creativity, how to be creative, business models, intellectual property, managing a creative company, the 22 largest sectors, online opportunities, creative capital and more.

== Sources ==
- John Howkins Creative Economy website
- Debrett's
