= CETIQT =

CETIQT - Centro de Tecnologia da Indústria Química e Têxtil
- Centro de Tecnologia da Indústria Química e Têxtil
- Type: Professional school and Professional development center
- Parent institution: SENAI - Serviço Nacional de Aprendizagem Industrial
- Location: Rio de Janeiro, Rio de Janeiro, Brazil; 22.9969°S 43.3608°W
- Campus: Campus Barra (Avenida Luís Carlos Prestes, 230 - Barra da Tijuca)
- Website: https://senaicetiqt.com/

CETIQT (Centro de Tecnologia da Indústria Química e Têxtil; English: Technology Center of Chemical and Textile Industry) is a higher education institution and a center for professional development focused on the textile and chemical industries in Brazil. It is located in Rio de Janeiro, at the Barra da Tijuca Campus, on Avenida Luís Carlos Prestes, 230 (22.9969°S 43.3608°W), in the Barra da Tijuca neighborhood.

CETIQT is one of the units of SENAI (Serviço Nacional de Aprendizagem Industrial; English: National Service for Industrial Training), maintained by the Brazilian Confederation of Industry. It offers undergraduate, postgraduate, and extension courses, specializing in the training of professionals for the industrial sector. Currently, it has two undergraduate programs: Chemical Engineering and Fashion Design.
