= SENAI =

Brazilian professional schools

Coordinates: 15°47′28″S 47°52′42″W

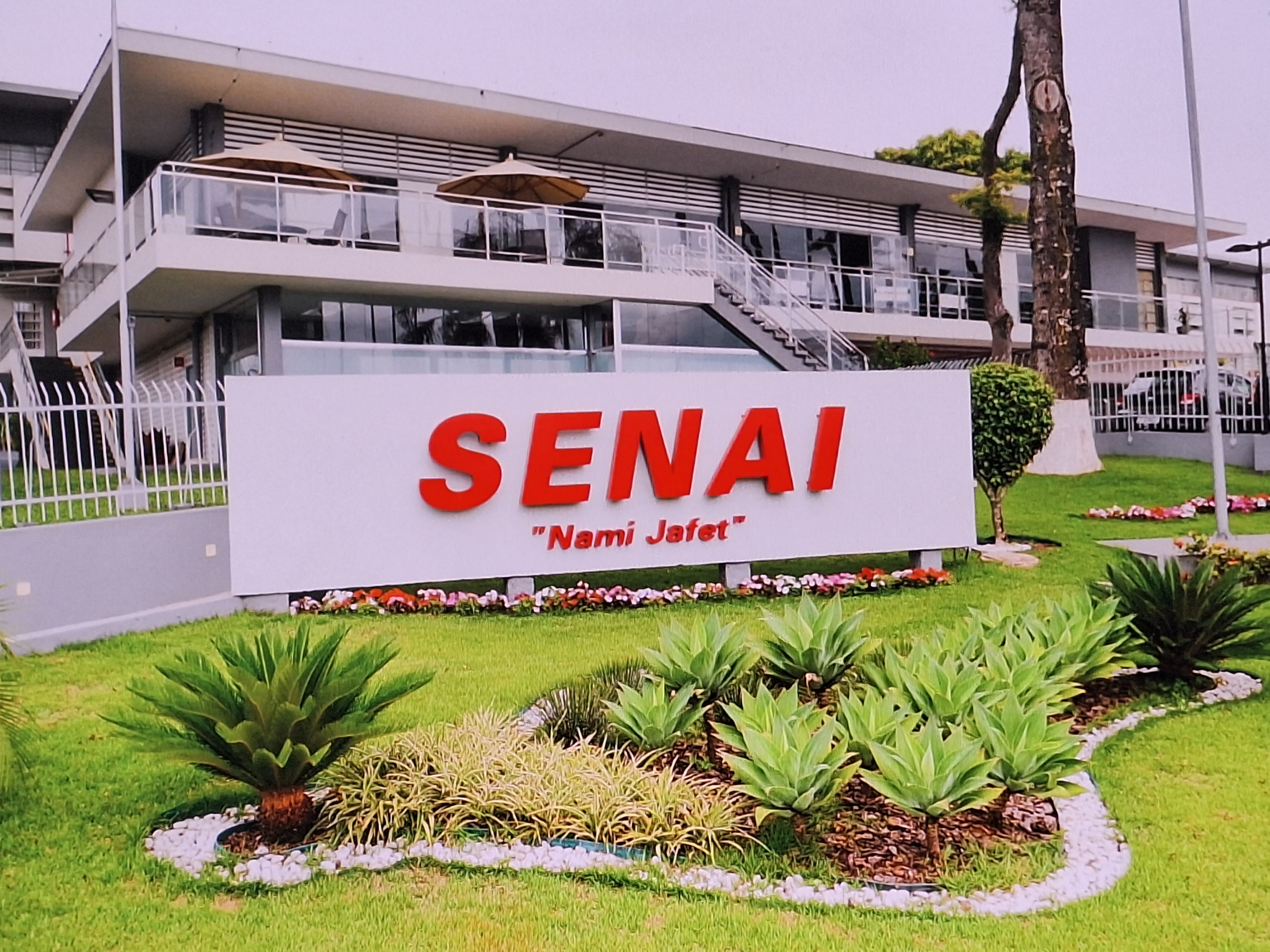
SENAI Nami Jafet, Mogi das Cruzes, SP

SENAI, or Serviço Nacional de Aprendizagem Industrial (transl. National Service for Industrial Training), is a network of secondary level professional schools established and maintained by the Brazilian Confederation of Industry (a patronal syndicate). SENAI is one of the most important institutions in the country providing formal training for specialized workers for the industry, in the areas of chemistry, mechanics, construction, etc.

SENAI has 744 operational units in all states of the Union, which offer more than 1,800 courses.

SENAI is part of an integrated social action system which was founded by industry and political leaders in the 1950s, under the leadership of Euvaldo Lodi, which includes SESI (Social Service for Industry), and the Instituto Euvaldo Lodi. The United Nations recognizes SENAI as an important institution for ensuring quality education.

== Social Services for Industry ==
The Brazilian Social Services for Industry (Serviço Social da Indústria (SESI) in Portuguese) is a private not-for-profit institution that operates throughout the country. It was set up in July 1946 with the aim of promoting social welfare, cultural development and improving the lives of workers and their families and the communities they live in.

== Role ==
The roles of SESI and the National Industrial Apprenticeships Association (SENAI) were set out in Acts 4.048, of 22 January 1942, 4.936, of 7 November 1942, 6.246, of 5 February 1944, and 9.403, of 25 June 1946. According to these bills, the roles referred to are owed by industrial establishments classified as such by the National Confederation of Industry (CNI), along the lines that they are required to pay a monthly contribution for the funding of social work among industrial workers and their dependents for the setting up and maintenance of training schools.

== Function ==
SESI maintains a presence in every state in Brazil and in the Federal District of Brasília through a chain of regional departments, each of which has jurisdiction and technical, financial, and administrative autonomy. Its function is the delivery of social services in the areas of health, education, leisure, culture, food, and the promotion of citizenship, having in mind improvements in quality of life among industrial workers and their families. Besides providing services in their activity centres and operational units, the regional departments develops operations within industry, and in harmony with the needs and expectations of the workers. Various projects also benefit the community through partnerships and agreements with international and national governmental and private institutions.

SENAI cooperates with Petrobras to offer an oil and gas industry scholarship program meant for disadvantaged people. The institution also offers vocational training courses.

== Theatre ==
Osmar Rodrigues Cruz, theatre director, founded the SESI Popular Theatre Company in 1963, presented the play 'Murderous City' (Cidade Assessina) .

== See also ==
- CETIQT
