= SESI Citizenship =

SESI Citizenship is a Brazilian program that aims to bring education, sports, leisure and culture to all pacified communities in the state of Rio de Janeiro, i.e., those that already have the Pacifying Police Units (UPPs). Created in August 2010, the program has already held about a million attendances in dozens of communities and was awarded the prize "Citizenship Personality 2013", granted to individuals and institutions who "contribute to the defense of civil rights, the strengthening of social promotion policies and the ethical values."

== Concept ==
SESI Citizenship is locally implemented whenever new UPPs are installed at each location. Its goal is to bring leisure activities and social services for the inhabitants of the region - some of them in a permanent way. According to previous researches that identify the main needs of each community, it is created a plan of what will be offered to residents. By the way, some of them are even hired to perform certain functions, such as: monitor the progress of work; identify the local needs further; promote, explain and enroll residents in activities and courses offered by the program. The so-called "SESI Citizenship Agents" also encourage people to learn how to read and write for the first time.

== Components of the program ==
The program contemplates some specific activities:

- Professional education – Workshops and laboratories that prepare the student for the labor market;
- Basic education – Elementary and secondary school for youth and adults, in addition to pre-Enem, tutoring, languages, computers, mathematics and budgeting;
- Athlete of the future – Leisure and citizenship teaching through sports activities for children and teenagers, seeking also to train future athletes; (Note: Among the activities offered are soccer, futsal, volleyball, basketball, judo, dancing, athletics, swimming and gymnastics.)
- Knowledge industry – Spreads culture and education while assembling in communities like Andaraí and Cidade de Deus libraries and digital inclusion spaces, as well as offering workshops, lectures and cultural attractions. Two partners in this initiative are Futura Channel (which offers television programming) and the Brazilian Academy of Letters (which helps to create and maintain libraries in communities of Rio de Janeiro, what includes the training of manpower);
- Seniors SESI Program – Activities for people over fifty years of age, such as physical exercise, nutritional and psychological counseling, medical care and sociocultural actions as "memory workshops and storytelling;"
- Culture – Cultural programs and workshops for residents on graffiti, photography, percussion, hip hop music and theater;
- Kitchen Brazil – Nutritionists teach the full utilization of food in order to improve eating habits;
- Health – Offices of gynaecology, internal medicine, dental and pediatrics to prevent health problems;
- SESI in Action – Services like issuing documents (identity card, social security number, work ID, birth certificate), recreation for children, craft workshops and painting, lectures on basic care (brushing teeth, for example), medical tests (measurement of blood pressure, blood glucose testing, body mass index), legal consultation and distribution of books;
- Lego Project - Uses Lego pieces to stimulate the learning of "logical and mathematical thinking and the basics of physics", including ethical and moral values, interpersonal relationship and teamwork.

== See also ==
- Crime
- Favela
- Entertainment
