= Bibliometro =

Public libraries network in Santiago Metro

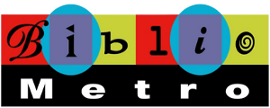

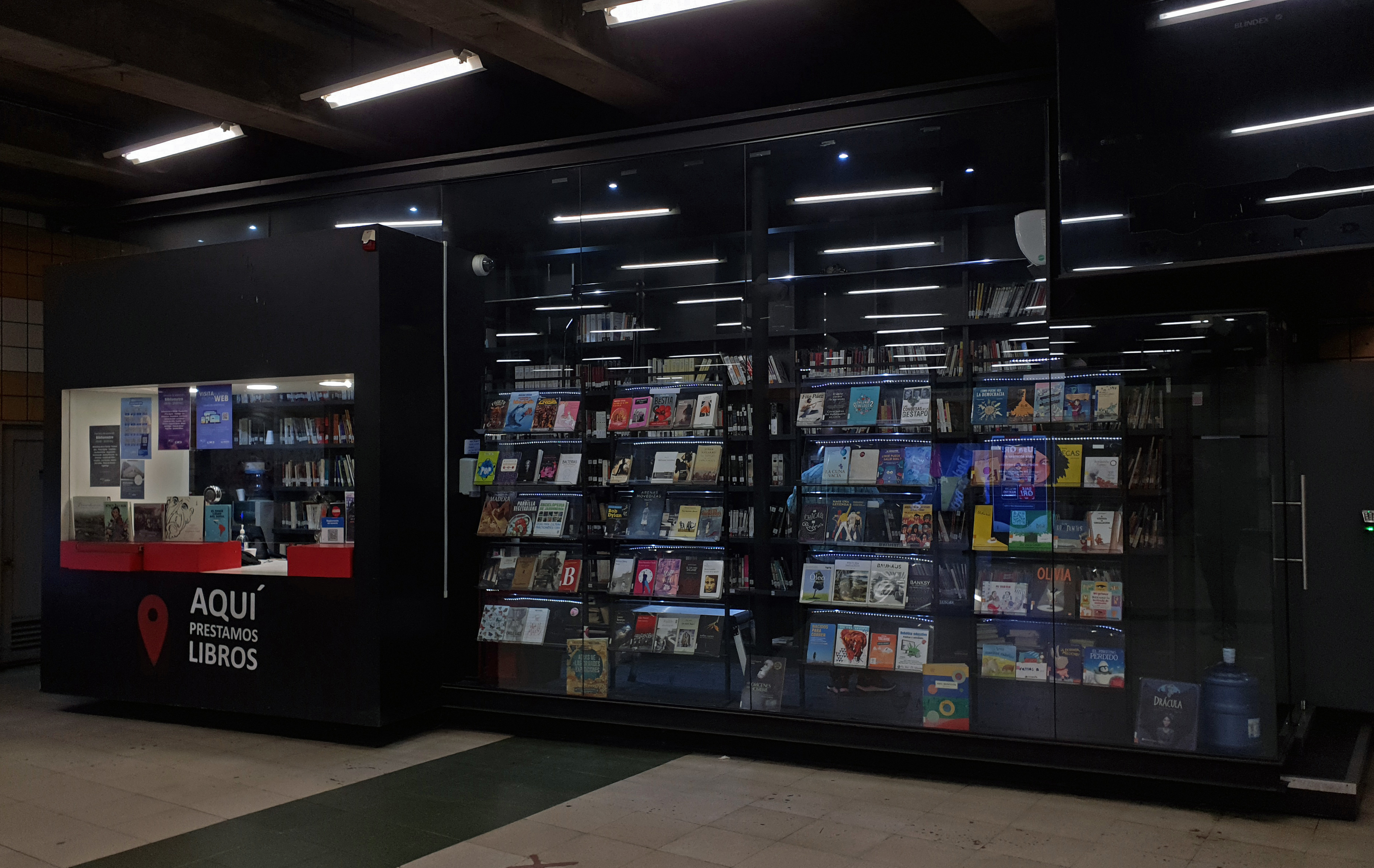
- Bibliometro at Baquedano station
- Location: Chile
- Established: June 26, 1996
- Service area: Santiago Metro
- Branches: 35 (2023)

Collection
- Size: 115,000

Other information
- Website: bibliometro.cl

Bibliometro (stylized as BiblioMetro) is a Chilean program of the Ministry of Cultures, Arts and Heritage created in 1995 through a cultural alliance between the Directorate of Libraries, Archives, and Museums (DIBAM) and the Santiago Metro.

== History ==
Bibliometro was created by DIBAM with the aim of increasing reading habits to general public.

On June 26, 1996, Bibliometro began operating, with its first three branches located at the Cal y Canto (Line 2), Los Héroes (Line 1), and Tobalaba (Line 1). Initially, each Bibliometro branch had 532 titles and 1,596 volumes.

From its inception, the main goal was to have a library service network, allowing users to request books at one service point and return them at any other, an innovative system for the time made possible by the software used, which keeps the branches connected in a network.

In 2019, the program expanded to the Valparaíso Metro as part of a partnership between the National Cultural Heritage Service and the public company.

Bibliometro has been successfully emulated in other countries, such as in the Madrid Metro and Metrovalencia in Spain, as well as in the Medellín Metro in Colombia.

As of 2023, the network has 35 in-person service branches, as well as 3 self-service modules, and a train car converted into a public library located next to the National Library of Chile.

== Branches ==
Line 1 West to east	Line 2 North to south	Line 3 Northwest to southeast	Line 4 Northeast to southeast	Line 5 Southwest to Southeast	Line 6 Southwest to Northeast
San Pablo; Pajaritos; Los Héroes; Baquedano; Tobalaba; Escuela Militar; Los Dominicos	Vespucio Norte; Puente Cal y Canto; Los Héroes; Franklin; Ciudad del Niño; La Cisterna	Puente Cal y Canto; Plaza de Armas; Irarrázaval; Ñuñoa; Plaza Egaña	Tobalaba; Plaza Egaña; Macul; Plaza de Puente Alto	Plaza de Maipú; San Pablo; Quinta Normal; Plaza de Armas; Baquedano; Irarrázaval; Bellavista de La Florida	Cerrillos; Lo Valledor; Franklin; Ñuñoa; Inés de Suárez

== Gallery ==
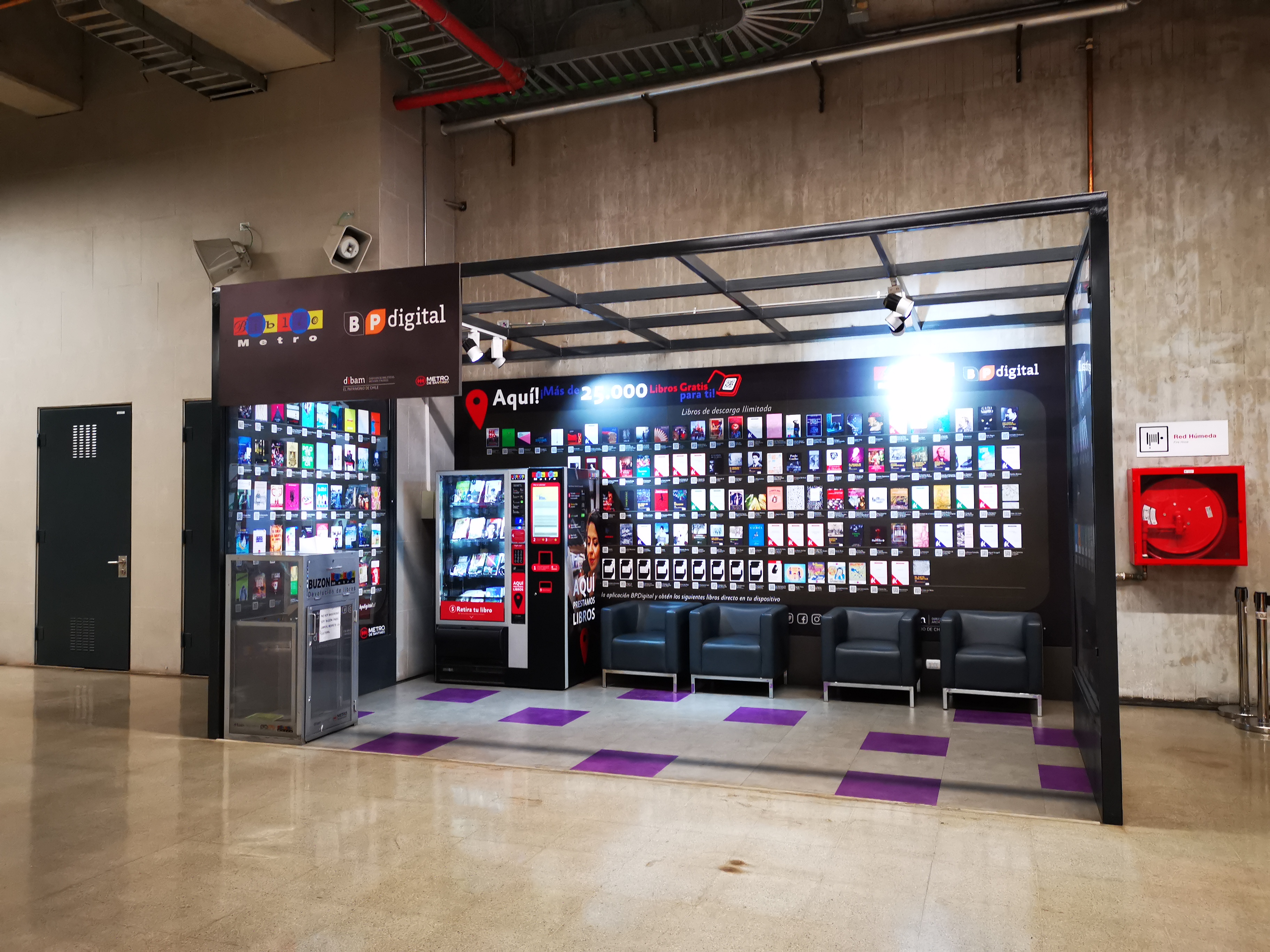
Bibliometro at Ñuñoa station

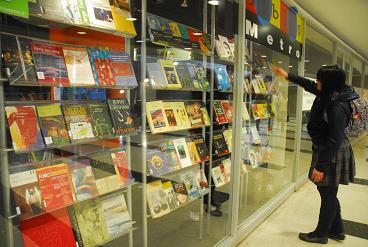
Bibliometro at Vespucio Norte station

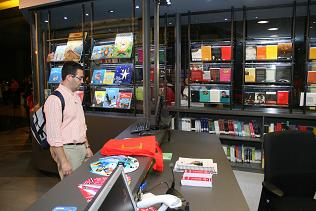
Bibliometro at Quinta Normal station

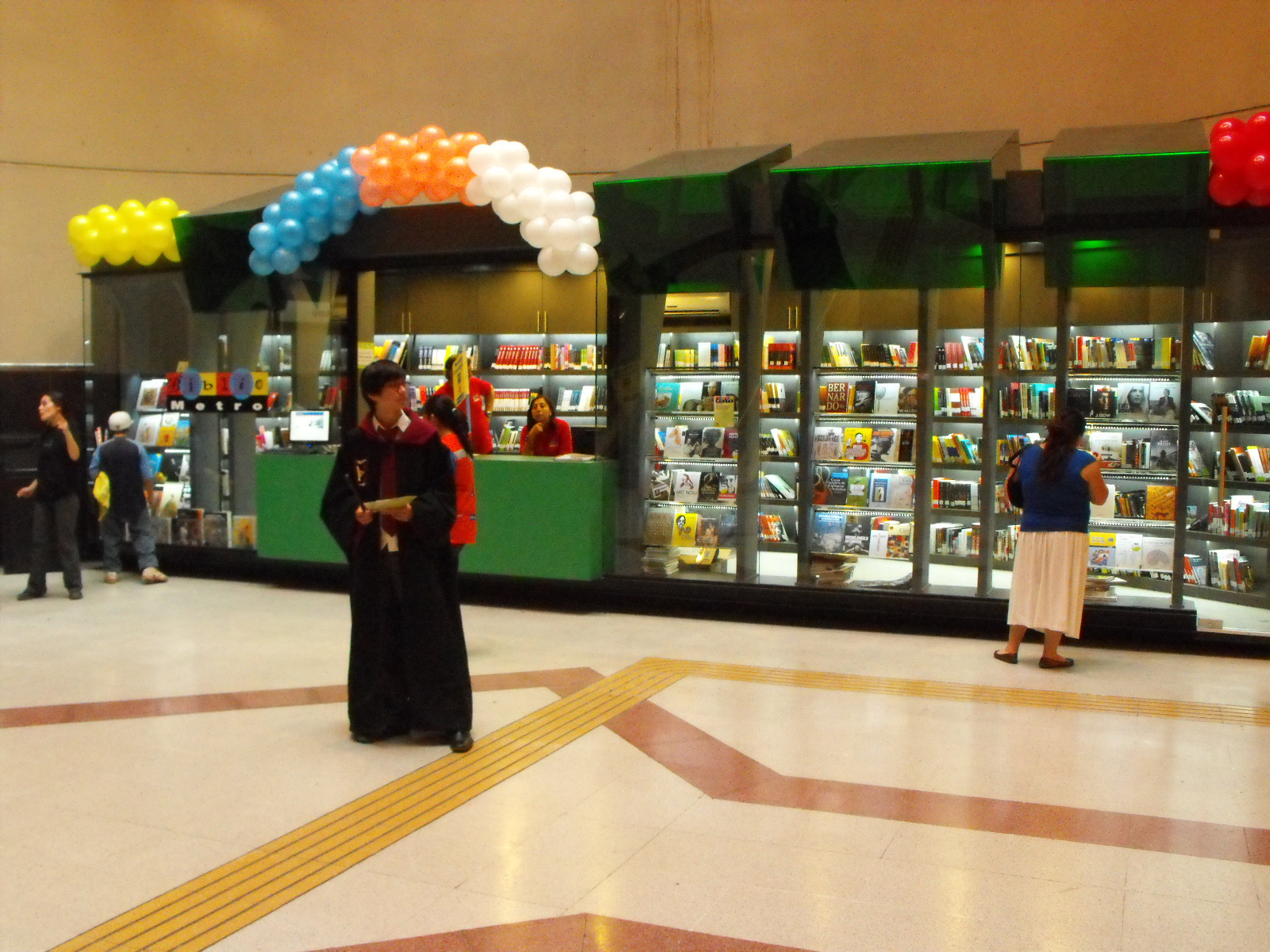
Bibliometro at Plaza Egaña station
