= Parque O'Higgins metro station =

Santiago metro station

Parque O'Higgins
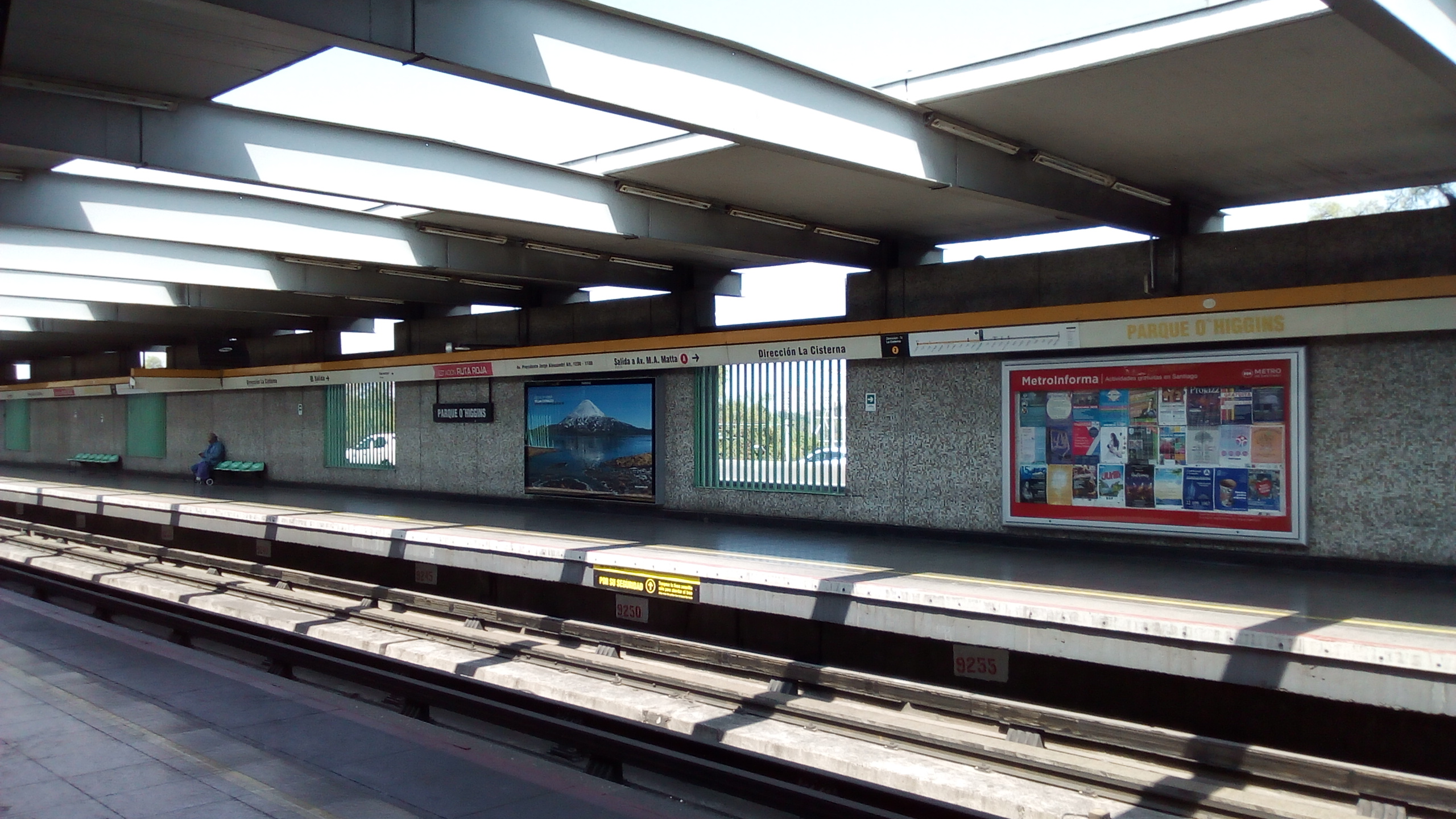

General information
- Coordinates: 33°27′41.93″S 70°39′24.38″W
- System: Santiago rapid transit
- Line: Line 2
- Platforms: 2 side platforms
- Tracks: 2
- Connections: Transantiago buses

Construction
- Accessible: yes

History
- Opened: March 31, 1978
- Former names: Parque

Services
Preceding station	Santiago Metro	Following station
Toesca towards Vespucio Norte	Line 2	Rondizzoni towards Hospital El Pino
Location

Parque O'Higgins is a metro station on the Line 2 of the Santiago Metro, in Santiago, Chile. It is located in the middle of the east branch of the Autopista Central, on a raised embankment, just prior to an elevated viaduct that crosses Matta avenue. The station is named for the adjacent Parque O'Higgins, located west of the station.

The station was opened on 31 March 1978 as part of the inaugural section of the line, between Los Héroes and Franklin.
