= Rondizzoni metro station =

Santiago metro station

Rondizzoni
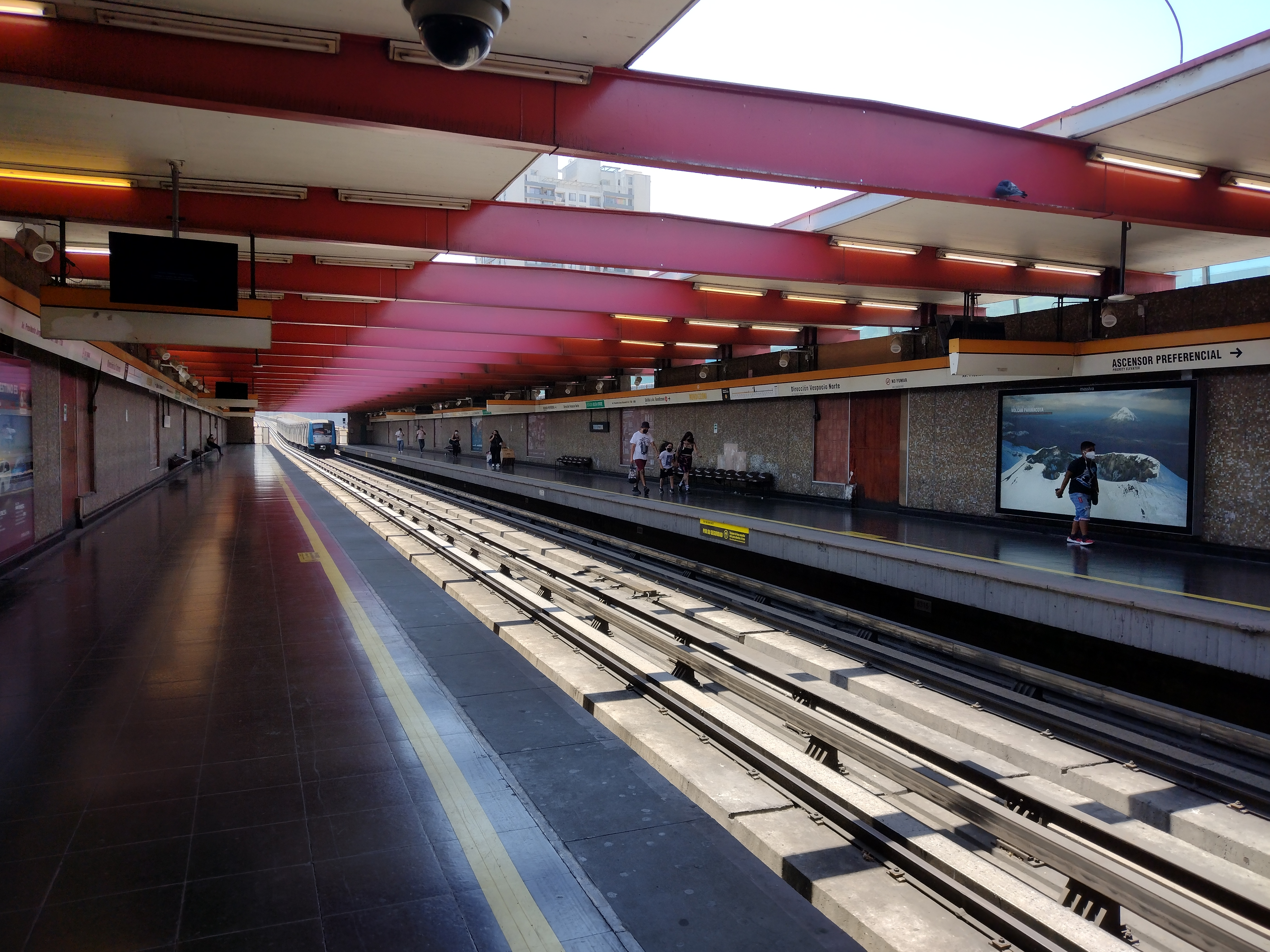

General information
- Coordinates: 33°28′10.79″S 70°39′22.81″W
- System: Santiago rapid transit
- Line: Line 2
- Platforms: 2 side platforms
- Tracks: 2
- Connections: Transantiago buses

Construction
- Accessible: yes

History
- Opened: March 31, 1978
- Former names: Rondizzoni-Famae (until 1997)

Services
Preceding station	Santiago Metro	Following station
Parque O'Higgins towards Vespucio Norte	Line 2	Franklin towards Hospital El Pino
Location

Rondizzoni is a metro station on the Line 2 of the Santiago Metro, in Santiago, Chile. It is located in the middle of a depressed alignment of Autopista Central and close to the southeast corner of O'Higgins Park. When the station opened, its name was Rondizzoni-Famae. Afterward, the name was truncated to just Rondizzoni.

The station was opened on 31 March 1978 as part of the inaugural section of the line, between Los Héroes and Franklin.

The station has an entrance on the Rondizzoni Avenue overpass. Line 2 enters a curved tunnel just south of the station and remains underground until its southern terminus.

For much of their length, the platforms are covered by a concrete canopy supported by steel beams. Several years ago the station was flooded and to prevent future floods the original barred rectangular openings in the platforms walls were filled in and covered with brick tiles.
