= Toesca metro station =

Santiago metro station

Toesca
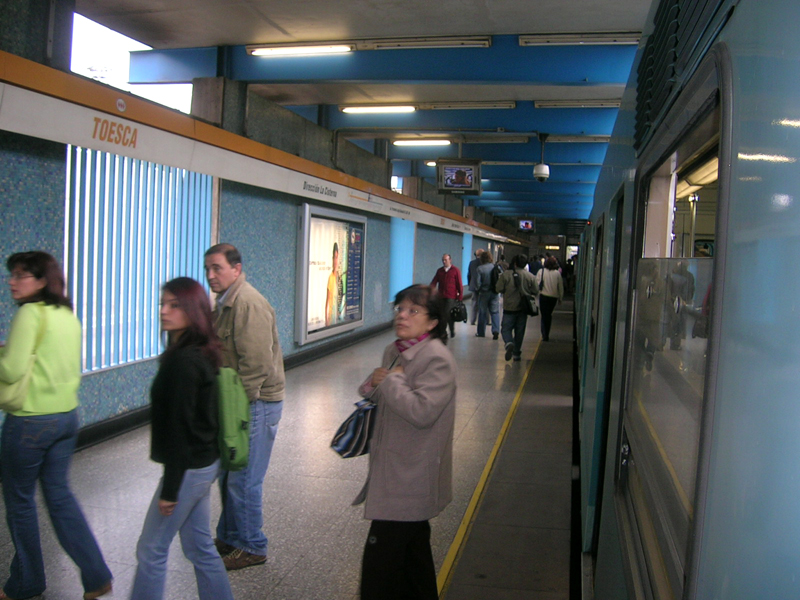

General information
- Coordinates: 33°27′10.48″S 70°39′30.89″W
- System: Santiago rapid transit
- Line: Line 2
- Platforms: 2 side platforms
- Tracks: 2
- Connections: Transantiago buses

Construction
- Accessible: yes

History
- Opened: March 31, 1978

Services
Preceding station	Santiago Metro	Following station
Los Héroes towards Vespucio Norte	Line 2	Parque O'Higgins towards Hospital El Pino
Location

Toesca is a metro station on the Line 2 of the Santiago Metro, in Santiago, Chile. It is located in the middle of a sunken stretch of the Autopista Central. The station is named for the nearby Toesca Street, which in turn is named after Joaquín Toesca, who designed La Moneda Palace.

The station was opened on 31 March 1978 as part of the inaugural section of the line, between Los Héroes and Franklin.

The station is close to the Palacio Cousiño.
