= Lo Vial metro station =

Santiago metro station

Lo Vial
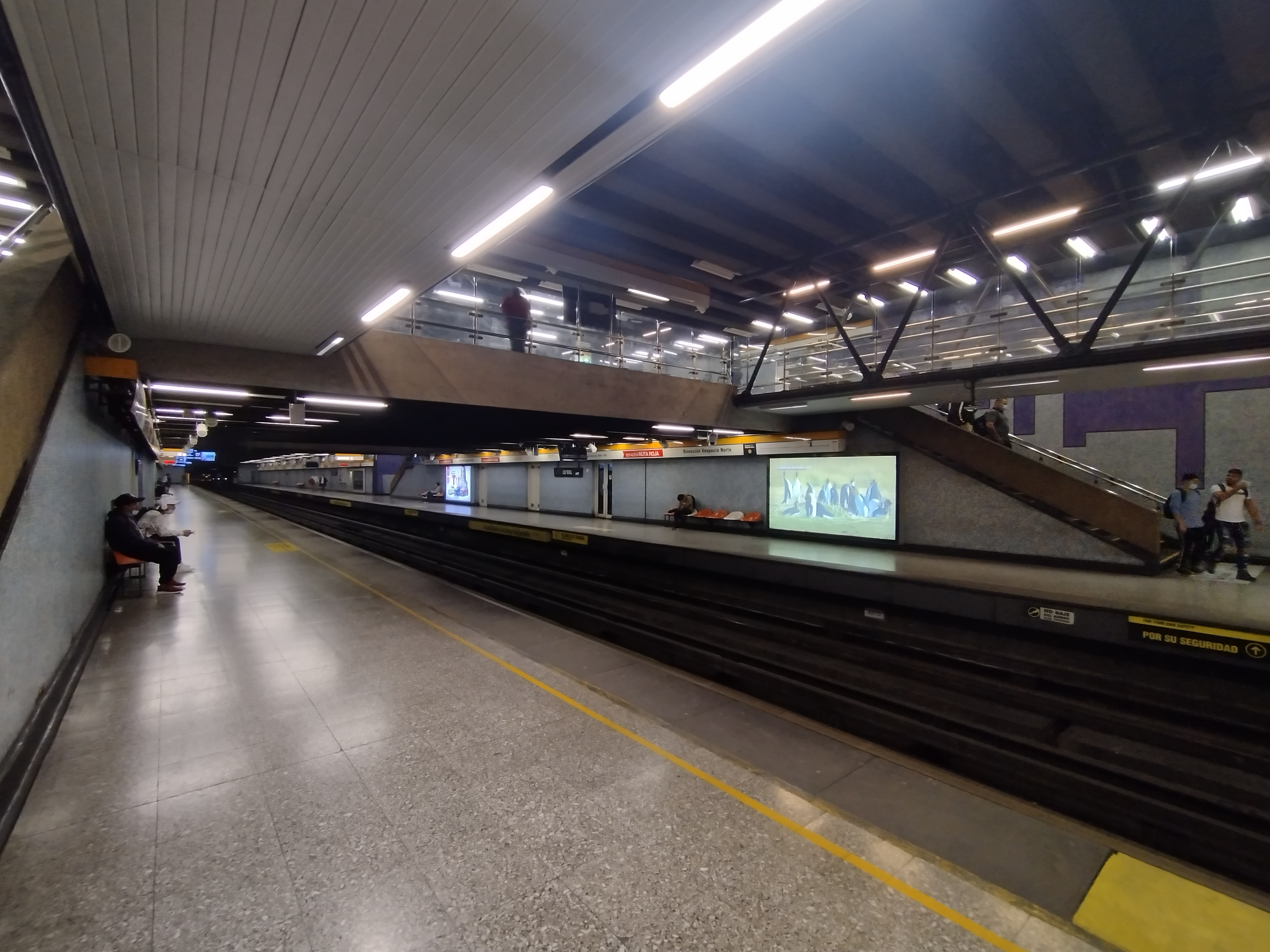
- Lo Vial station platforms.

General information
- Location: Gran Avenida José Miguel Carrera / Blanco Viel Street
- Coordinates: 33°29′48.85″S 70°39′10.82″W
- System: Santiago rapid transit
- Line: Line 2
- Platforms: 2 side platforms
- Tracks: 2
- Connections: Transantiago buses

Construction
- Accessible: yes

History
- Opened: December 21, 1978

Services
Preceding station	Santiago Metro	Following station
San Miguel towards Vespucio Norte	Line 2	Departamental towards Hospital El Pino
Location

Lo Vial is an underground metro station on the Line 2 of the Santiago Metro, in Santiago, Chile. The station was opened on 21 December 1978 as part of the extension of the line from Franklin to Lo Ovalle.
