= San Miguel metro station =

Santiago metro station

San Miguel
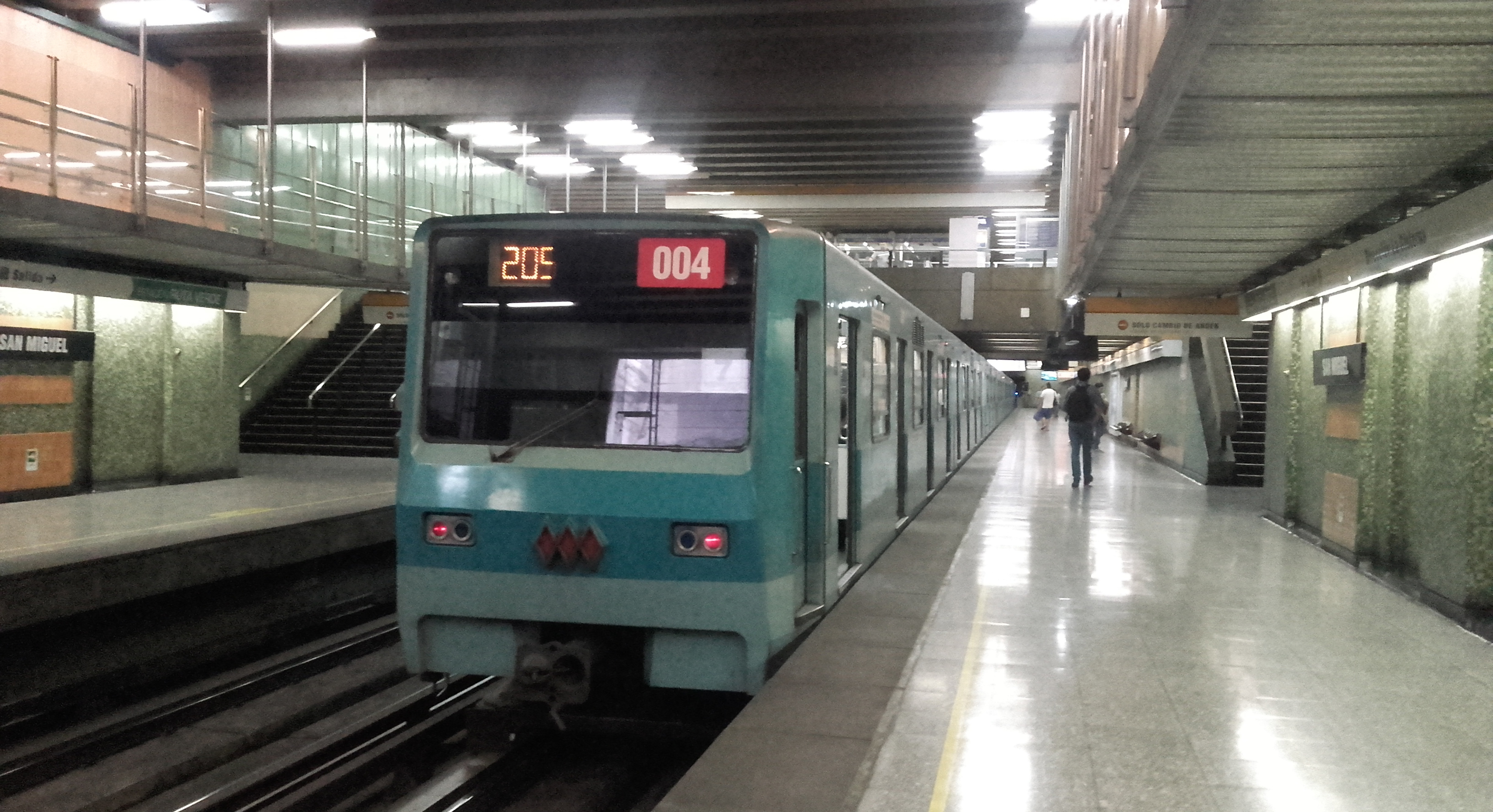

General information
- Location: Gran Avenida / Curiñanca Street
- Coordinates: 33°29′19.69″S 70°39′3.90″W
- System: Santiago rapid transit
- Line: Line 2
- Platforms: 2 side platforms
- Tracks: 2
- Connections: Transantiago buses

Construction
- Accessible: yes

History
- Opened: December 21, 1978

Services
| Preceding station | Santiago Metro | Following station |
|---|---|---|
| El Llano towards Vespucio Norte | Line 2 | Lo Vial towards Hospital El Pino |
Location

San Miguel is an underground metro station on the Line 2 of the Santiago Metro, in Santiago, Chile. The station was opened on 21 December 1978 as part of the extension of the line from Franklin to Lo Ovalle.
