= El Llano metro station =

Santiago metro station

El Llano
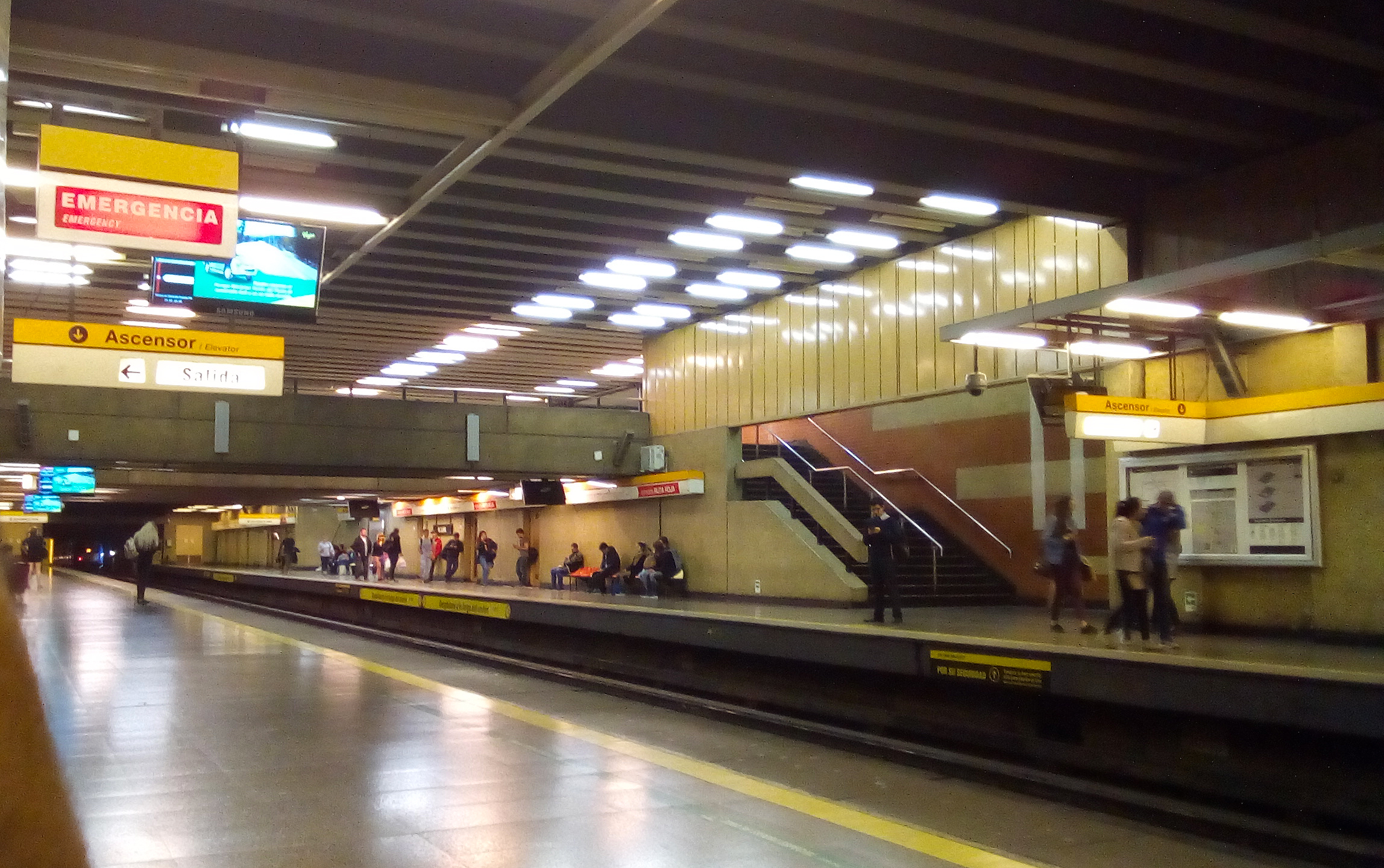

General information
- Location: Gran Avenida José Miguel Carrera / José Joaquín Vallejo Street
- Coordinates: 33°28′57.7″S 70°38′59.10″W
- System: Santiago rapid transit
- Line: Line 2
- Platforms: 2 side platforms
- Tracks: 2
- Connections: Transantiago buses

Construction
- Accessible: yes

History
- Opened: December 21, 1978
- Former names: El Llano-Subercaseaux (until 1997)

Services
Preceding station	Santiago Metro	Following station
Franklin towards Vespucio Norte	Line 2	San Miguel towards Hospital El Pino
Location

El Llano is an underground metro station on the Line 2 of the Santiago Metro, in Santiago, Chile. The station was opened on 21 December 1978 as part of the extension of the line from Franklin to Lo Ovalle.
