= Santiago Metro Line 9 =

Planned railway line in Santiago, Chile

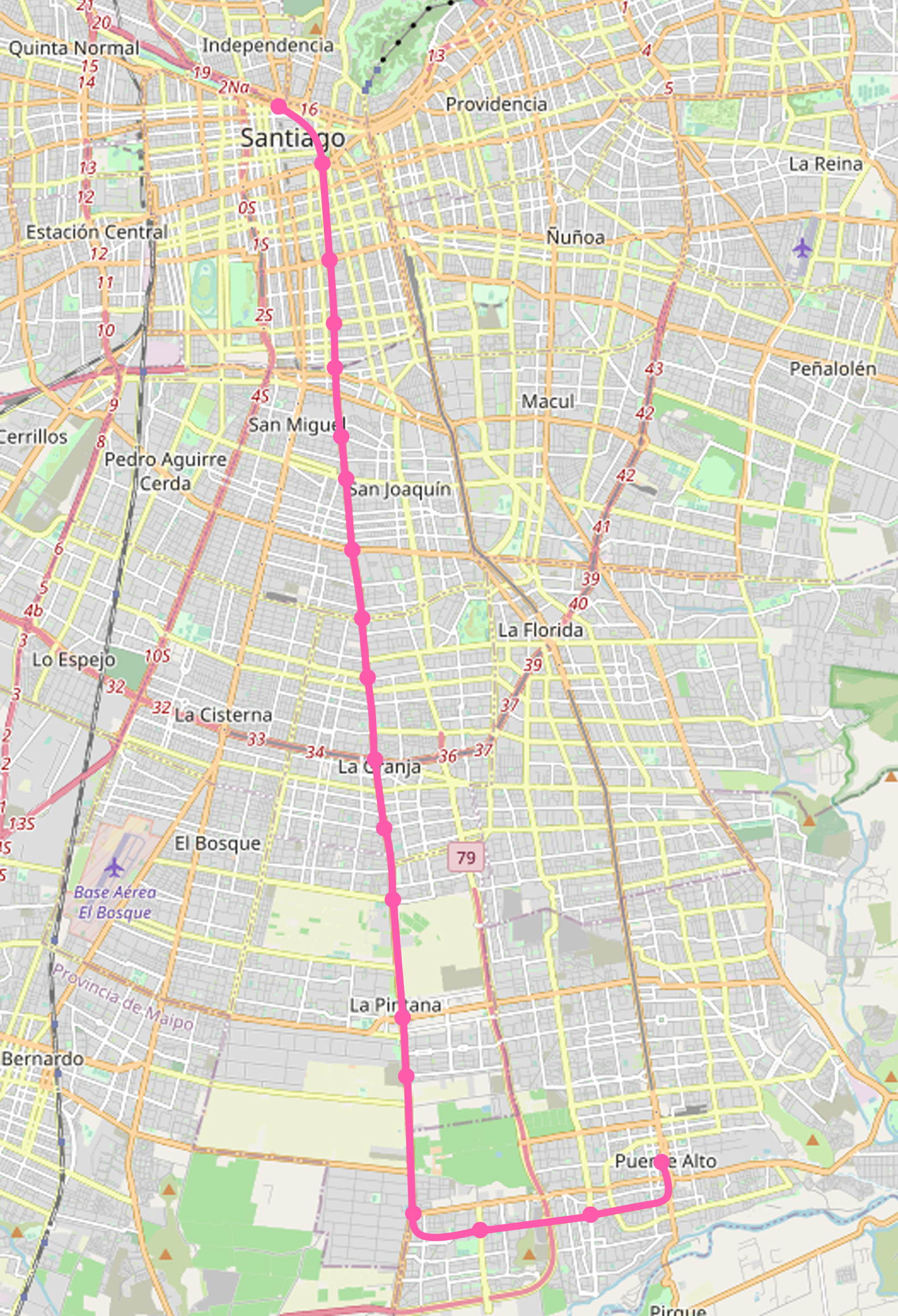
- Map of Line 9

Overview
- Status: Under construction
- Owner: Empresa de Transporte de Pasajeros Metro S.A.
- Locale: Santiago
- Termini: Puente Cal y Canto metro station; Plaza de Puente Alto metro station
- Stations: 19

Service
- Type: Rapid transit
- System: Santiago Metro, Transantiago
- Services: 1
- Operator(s): Empresa de Transporte de Pasajeros Metro S.A.

History
- Planned opening: 2030 (First stage); 2032 (Second stage); 2033 (Third stage)

Technical
- Line length: 17 km (11 mi)
- Number of tracks: 2
- Character: Underground
Route map

Santiago Metro Line 9 is a future metro line that will form part of the Santiago Metro system, with an approximate length of 17 kilometers (11 mi). The line will begin in Santiago Centro and terminate in Puente Alto in the south of the Chilean capital.

The new line will connect with the existing Santiago Metro lines 2, 3 and 7 at Puente Cal y Canto, with line 1 at Santa Lucía, with line 3 at Matta, with line 6 at Bío Bío, with line 4A at Santa Rosa and with line 4 at Plaza de Puente Alto. The distinctive color of the network line map will be pink.

== History ==
A Metro line along the axis of Santa Rosa Avenue was originally proposed by architect Juan Parrochia when proposing a Metro master plan in 1968. The so-called Line 12 would have run along this avenue by the year 2040.

In 2006, the Interministerial Secretary of Transportation Planning (SECTRA) suggested a similar metro line along the Santa Rosa, which was eventually postponed due to the 2007 public transport crisis (Transantiago crisis).

In 2013, the Santiago Transportation Master Plan 2025 considered alternatives for a mass transit system along Santa Rosa Avenue, incudling a tram and a light rail. Claudia Pizarro, then-mayor of La Pintana, one of the poorest communes in the Greater Santiago and one of the few without a Metro connection at the time, advocated for the construction of a line extending into their territory.

The construction of Line 9 was finally announced in June 2018 by President Sebastián Piñera, along with the construction of Line 8. In the announcement, the line was originally expected to have a length of approximately 17 kilometers and feature 12 stations.

As a result of the 2019 October protests in Santiago that affected the Santiago Metro, the company declared void the bids for lines 8 and 9 in March 2020 as resources were instead allocated to repair the damage caused by the multiple incendiary attacks inflicted on several stations during the social crisis.

On August 9, 2023, President Gabriel Boric announced changes in the Line 9 route, including a terminal station in Cal y Canto, connecting with Line 2, Line 3 and Line 7; while its south ending original settled in Santa Rosa was relocated by extending the route towards Plaza de Puente Alto, connecting with Line 4.

Line 9 is expected to be inaugurated in phases: the first section between Bio-Bío and Plaza La Pintana stations is set to open in 2030, while the section from Bío-Bío to Cal y Canto would start its operation in 2032. Finally, the inauguration year of the section between Santa Rosa and Plaza de Puente Alto has been set for 2033.

== Stations ==
Stations running from north to south.

Stations (tentative name)	Transfers	Location	Opening	Commune
Puente Cal y Canto	Santiago Metro Line 2 Santiago Metro Line 3 Santiago Metro Line 7	Puente Alberto Hurtado/Presidente Balmaceda	2032	Santiago
Santa Lucía	Santiago Metro Line 1	Santa Rosa/Alameda	2032	Santiago
Matta	Santiago Metro Line 3	Santa Rosa/Matta	2032	Santiago
Ñuble (Note: Not to be confused with the name of the Ñuble station on Lines Line 5 and Line 6.)		Santa Rosa/Ñuble	2032	Santiago
Bío Bío	Santiago Metro Line 6	Santa Rosa/Pintor Cicarelli	2030	Santiago
Pedro Alarcón		Santa Rosa/Alcalde Pedro Alarcón	2030	San Miguel/San Joaquín
La Legua		Santa Rosa/Salesianos	2030	San Miguel/San Joaquín
Departamental (Note: Not to be confused with the name of the Departamental station on Line 2.)		Santa Rosa/Departamental	2030	San Miguel/San Joaquín
Lo Ovalle (Note: Not to be confused with the name of the Lo Ovalle station on Line 2.)		Santa Rosa/Lo Ovalle	2030	La Granja/San Ramón/San Joaquín/San Miguel
Linares		Santa Rosa/Los Tilos	2030	La Granja/San Ramón
Santa Rosa	Santiago Metro Line 4A	Santa Rosa/Américo Vespucio	2030	La Granja/San Ramón
Hospital Padre Hurtado		Santa Rosa/Esperanza	2030	La Granja/San Ramón
El Observatorio (Note: Not to be confused with the name of the Observatorio station on Line 2.)		Santa Rosa/Observatorio	2030	La Pintana
Plaza La Pintana		Santa Rosa/Gabriela	2030	La Pintana
La Primavera		Santa Rosa/La Primavera	2033	La Pintana
Eyzaguirre		Santa Rosa/Eyzaguirre	2033	La Pintana/Puente Alto
Juanita		Sargento Menadier/Juanita	2033	Puente Alto
Ejército Libertador		Sargento Menadier/Ejército Libertador	2033	Puente Alto
Plaza de Puente Alto	Santiago Metro Line 4	Concha y Toro/Manuel Rodriguez	2033	Puente Alto
