= El Parrón metro station =

Santiago metro station

El Parrón
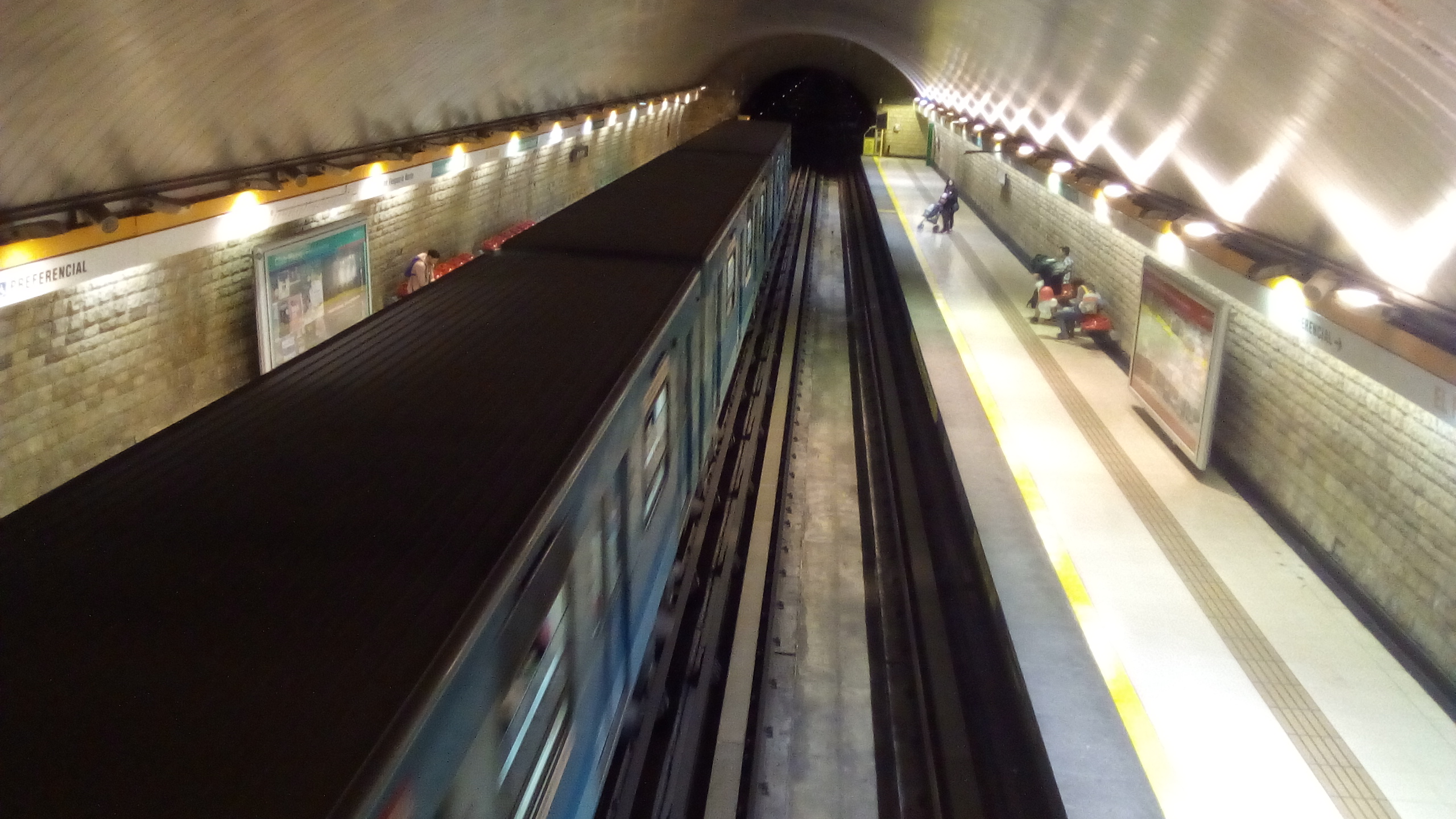

General information
- Location: Gran Avenida / El Parrón Avenue
- Coordinates: 33°31′35.29″S 70°39′41.7″W
- System: Santiago rapid transit
- Line: Line 2
- Platforms: 2 side platforms
- Tracks: 2
- Connections: Transantiago buses

Construction
- Accessible: yes

History
- Opened: December 22, 2004

Services
Preceding station	Santiago Metro	Following station
Lo Ovalle towards Vespucio Norte	Line 2	La Cisterna towards Hospital El Pino
Location

El Parrón is an underground metro station on the Line 2 of the Santiago Metro, in Santiago, Chile.

The station was inaugurated on 22 December 2004 as part of the southern Line 2 extension alongside La Cisterna.
