= El Bosque metro station =

Santiago metro station

El Bosque
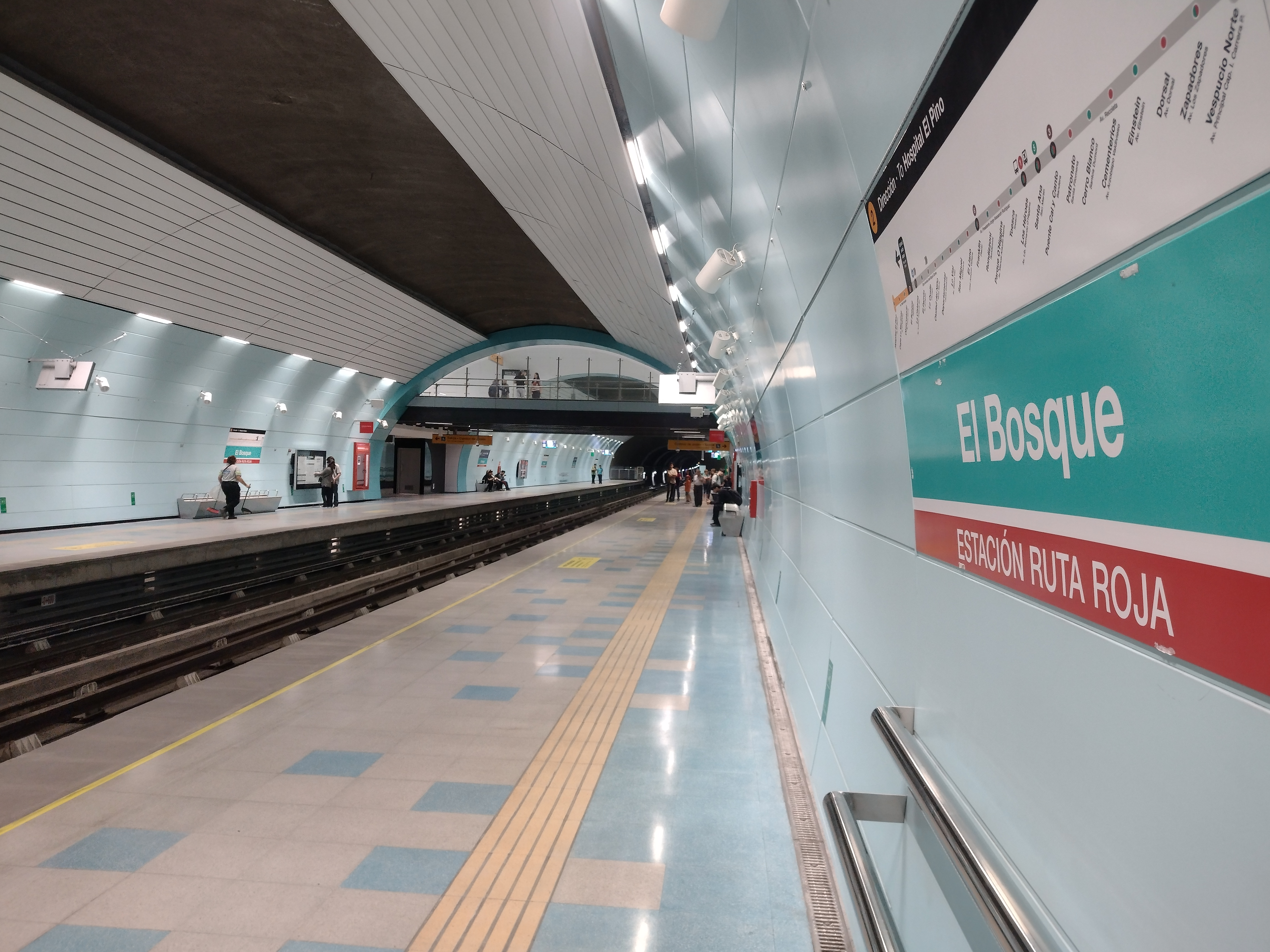

General information
- Location: Padre Hurtado Avenue/Ernesto Riquelme Street
- Coordinates: 33°32′47″S 70°40′01″W
- System: Santiago rapid transit
- Line: Line 2
- Platforms: 2 side platforms
- Tracks: 2
- Connections: Red buses

Construction
- Accessible: yes

History
- Opened: 27 November 2023

Services
Preceding station	Santiago Metro	Following station
La Cisterna towards Vespucio Norte	Line 2	Observatorio towards Hospital El Pino
Location

El Bosque is an underground metro station on the Line 2 of the Santiago Metro, in Santiago, Chile.

The station opened on 27 November 2023 as part of the southern Line 2 extension alongside Hospital El Pino.
