= Ciudad del Niño metro station =

Santiago metro station

Ciudad del Niño
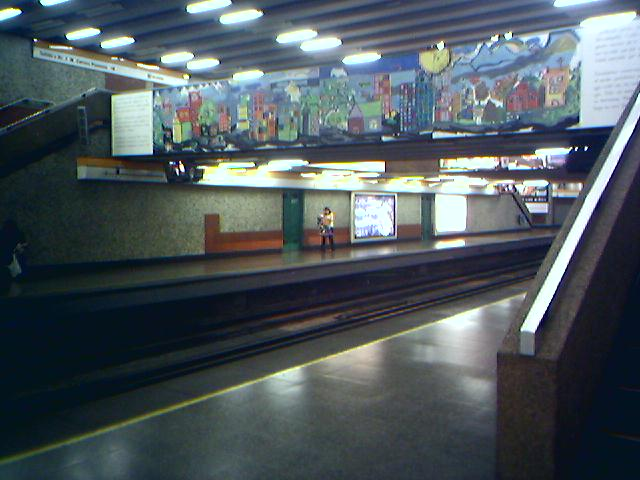

General information
- Location: Gran Avenida José Miguel Carrera / Sexta Avenida Street
- Coordinates: 33°30′34.32″S 70°39′23.90″W
- System: Santiago rapid transit
- Line: Line 2
- Platforms: 2 side platforms
- Tracks: 2
- Connections: Transantiago buses

Construction
- Accessible: yes

History
- Opened: December 21, 1978

Services
Preceding station	Santiago Metro	Following station
Departamental towards Vespucio Norte	Line 2	Lo Ovalle towards Hospital El Pino
Location

Ciudad del Niño is an underground metro station on the Line 2 of the Santiago Metro, in Santiago, Chile. It was named after the former Ciudad del Niño Presidente Juan Antonio Ríos. The station was opened on 21 December 1978 as part of the extension of the line from Franklin to Lo Ovalle.

On 10 December 1985, a unit of the Manuel Rodríguez Patriotic Front assaulted the ticket offices and detonated two kilograms of explosives behind a train in the station.

The station remained closed between 19 October and 11 November 2019 due to the mass fare evasion events that affected it during the protests triggered by the metro fare increase.
