= Puente Cal y Canto metro station =

Santiago metro station

Puente Cal y Canto
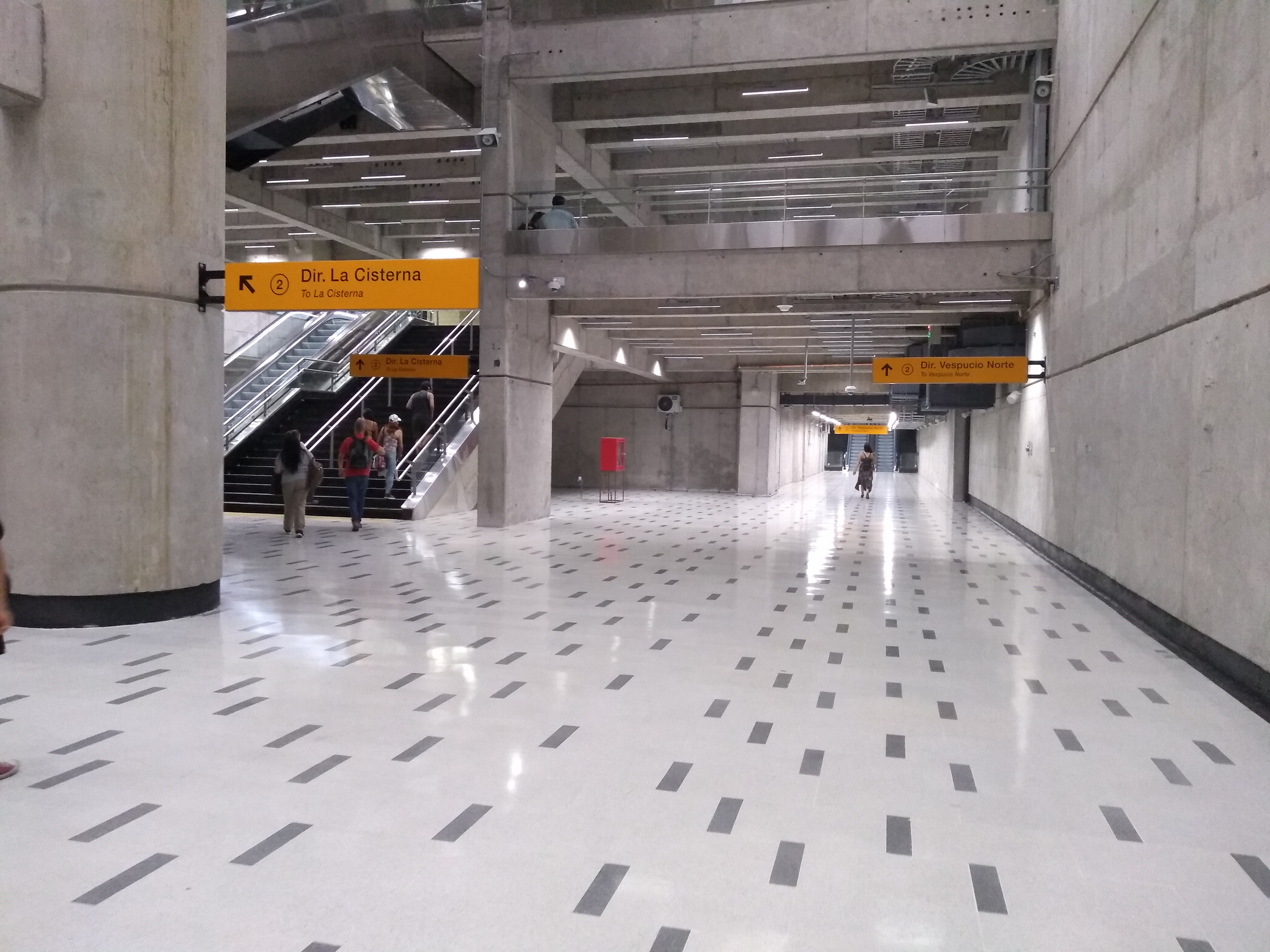
- Combination zone between lines 2 and 3.

General information
- Coordinates: 33°25′59.13″S 70°39′6.58″W
- System: Santiago rapid transit
- Lines: Line 2 Line 3
- Platforms: 6 side platforms
- Tracks: 2
- Connections: Transantiago buses

Construction
- Accessible: yes

History
- Opened: 15 September 1987; 22 January 2019; 2028; 2032

Services
Preceding station	Santiago Metro	Following station
Patronato towards Vespucio Norte	Line 2	Santa Ana towards Hospital El Pino
Hospitales towards Plaza Quilicura	Line 3	Plaza de Armas towards Fernando Castillo Velasco
Location

Puente Cal y Canto is a transfer station between the Line 2 and Line 3 of the Santiago Metro. Originally named Mapocho, it was renamed to Puente Cal y Canto shortly after its opening. This name is taken from the former bridge on the Mapocho River, whose remains were found during the construction of the station. The station's platforms walls have a decoration that resembles the architecture of the mentioned bridge. The Line 2 station was opened on 15 September 1987 as the northern terminus of the extension of the line from Los Héroes. On 8 September 2004 the line was extended to Cerro Blanco. The Line 3 station was opened on 22 January 2019 as part of the inaugural section of the line, from Los Libertadores to Fernando Castillo Velasco.

This station has a ghost station belonging to the original project of the line 3.

Nearby points of interest are the Estación Mapocho Culture Center and the Santiago Seafood Market.

It is expected that by 2028 and 2032 this station will be combined with the future Lines 7 and 9.

== Line 3 ==
The platforms of the original project of the line 3 are located underneath the line 2 side of the station.

This sector is located to the east of the station, or direction Vespucio norte at the two ends of the platform, a large space totally empty, with clear evidence that something is missing, and it is possible to see such structures, who were analyzed and rectified, in the place of the ticket counter corresponds to the place where goes the passage seen in the image 1, and the side structures have to be removed, so it will be appreciated the view point downwards, towards the line 3. To the sides of this structure the stairs are found, there is an evident door, that connects with such station. That red wall that can be seen is clearly provisional, it isn't totally solid, as well as the unions with the concrete ceiling that is notably not coincident. Recently some metro offices have been built in that site.

Also, it is possible to see some metal partitions that are yellow in color in to staircases (of the two platforms) towards the superior mesanine of the station. Supposedly, it hides some possible ways of access (stairs) towards the platforms of the line 3.

The platforms that will be destined to the construction of the future station and that were built jointly with the now operational, will not be used. Metro modified the location of the work, placing it a few meters to the west (in direction Vespucio Norte-La Cisterna), by the fact that the line 3 will go underneath Calle Bandera and not by the axis Puente-Ahumada (according to the original project) also that the fact that the trains that will be used (AS-2014) will be of broad loading gauge, unlike the NS-74 trains of the epoch.
