= Observatorio =

Observatorio may refer to:

- Observatorio metro station (Mexico City), Mexico
- Observatorio metro station (Santiago), Chile
- Observatorio railway station, an El Insurgente commuter station in Mexico City
- Observatorio Island, an alternative name for Gamma Island, in Antarctica
