= Observatorio metro station (Santiago) =

Santiago metro station

Observatorio
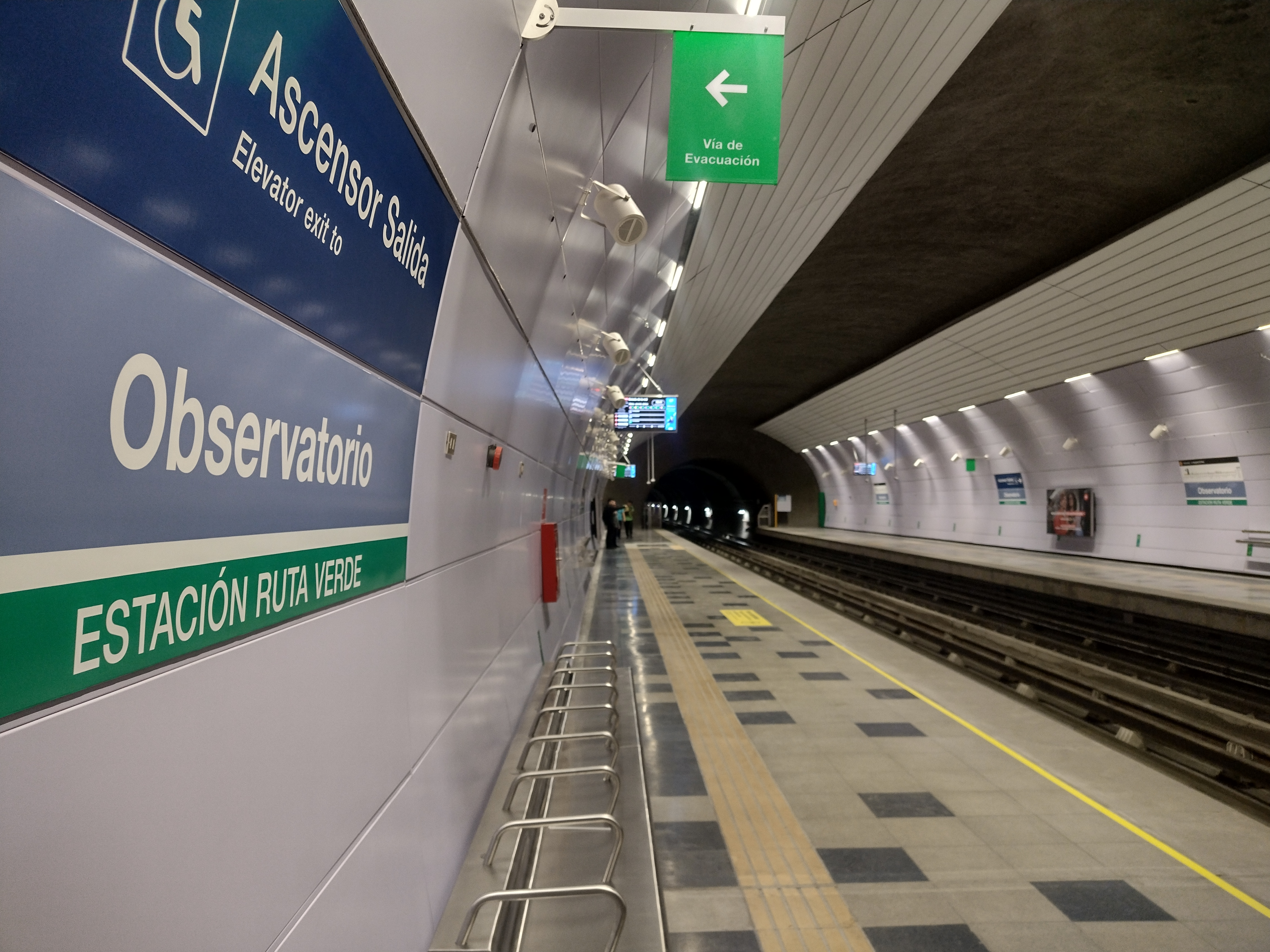

General information
- Location: Padre Hurtado/Observatorio Avenues
- Coordinates: 33°33′38″S 70°40′13″W
- System: Santiago rapid transit
- Line: Line 2
- Platforms: 2 side platforms
- Tracks: 2
- Connections: Red buses

Construction
- Accessible: yes

History
- Opened: 27 November 2023

Services
Preceding station	Santiago Metro	Following station
El Bosque towards Vespucio Norte	Line 2	Copa Lo Martínez towards Hospital El Pino
Location

Observatorio is an underground metro station on the Line 2 of the Santiago Metro, in Santiago, Chile.

The station opened on 27 November 2023 as part of the southern Line 2 extension alongside Hospital El Pino.
