= Los Héroes metro station =

Santiago metro station

Los Héroes
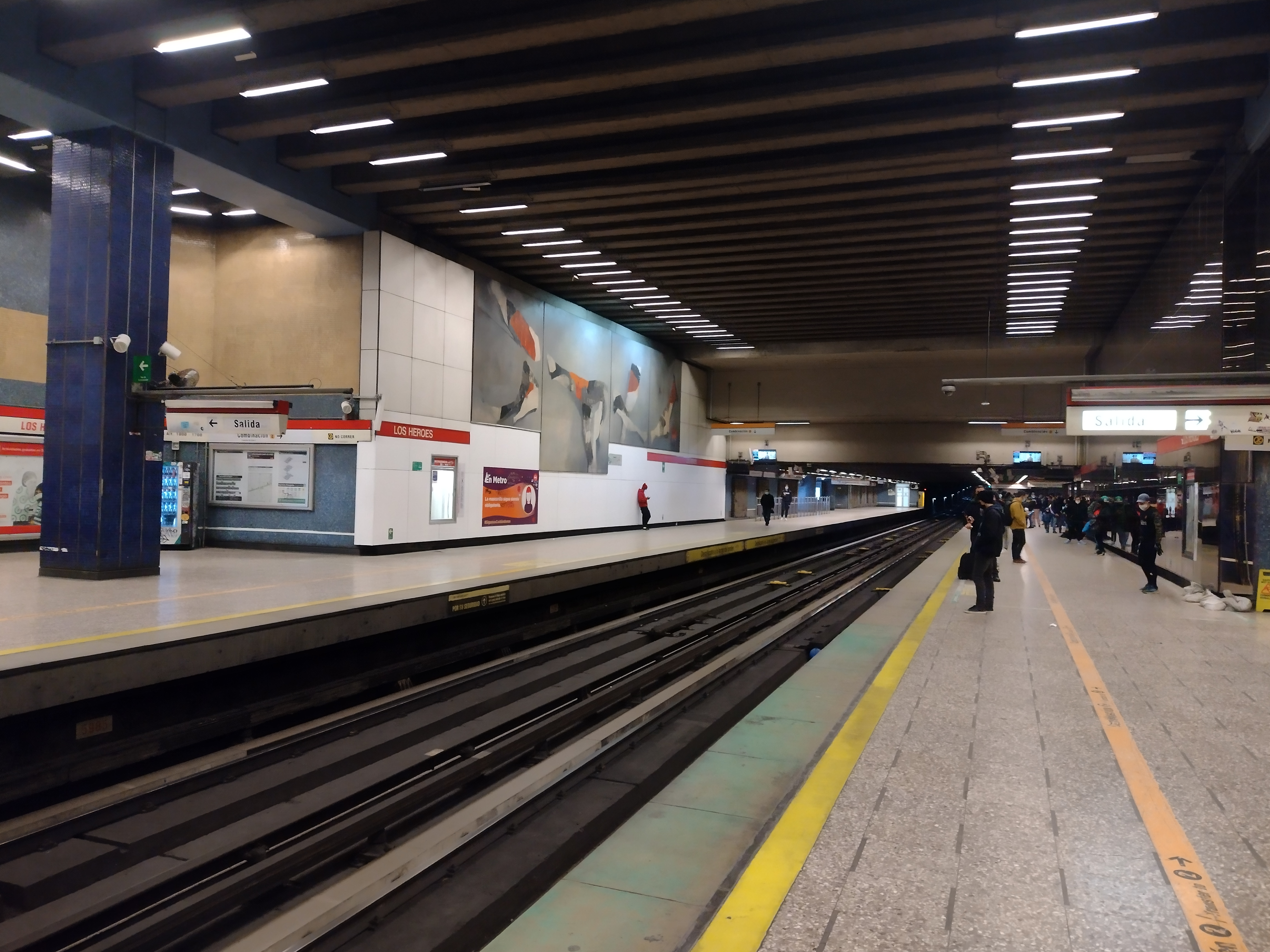

General information
- Location: Alameda / Autopista Central Freeway
- Coordinates: 33°26′46.21″S 70°39′37.59″W
- System: Santiago rapid transit
- Lines: Line 1 Line 2
- Platforms: 2 side platforms for each line
- Tracks: 2 per line
- Connections: Transantiago buses

Construction
- Accessible: yes

History
- Opened: September 15, 1975; March 31, 1978

Services
Preceding station	Santiago Metro	Following station
República towards San Pablo	Line 1	La Moneda towards Los Dominicos
Santa Ana towards Vespucio Norte	Line 2	Toesca towards Hospital El Pino
Location

Los Héroes is a rapid transit station of the Santiago Metro system, being an interchange point in between Line 1 and Line 2. It located at the intersection of Avenida Libertador General Bernardo O'Higgins and the Norte-Sur branch of the Autopista Central, which is considered the kilometre zero of Chile.

The Line 1 station was opened on 15 September 1975 as part of the inaugural section of the line between San Pablo and La Moneda. The Line 2 station was opened on 31 March 1978 as the northern terminus of the inaugural section of this line, to Franklin. On 15 September 1987 the line was extended to Puente Cal y Canto.

It is unusual in its design that it is located underneath the Libertador Bernardo O'Higgins Avenue, but simultaneously in the median of the Ruta 5, which is the Chilean section of the Pan American Highway.

== Etymology ==
The station is named after the nearby monument built in honor of the heroes of the Battle of La Concepción.
