= Santiago Metro Line 2 =

Chilean transit line

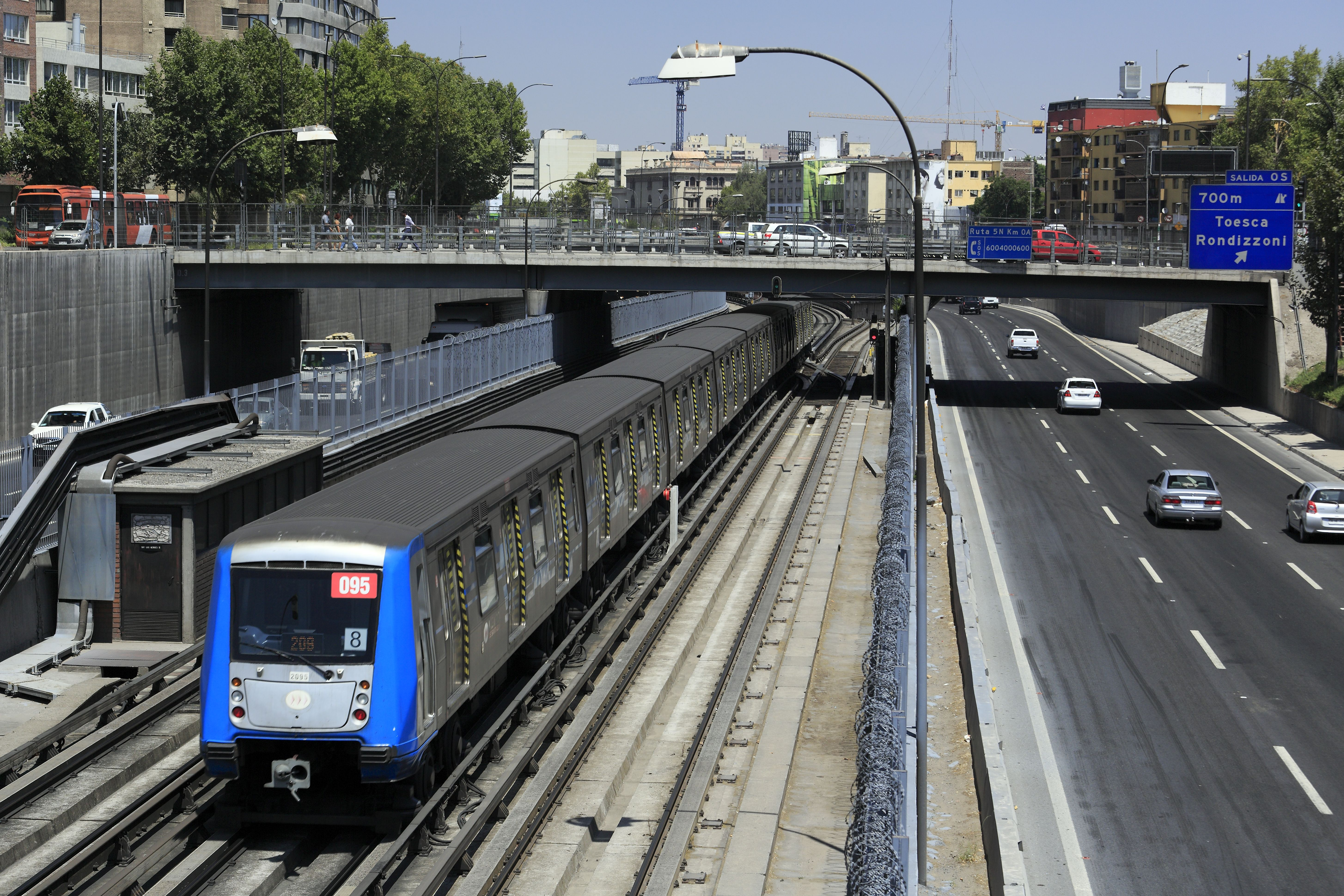
- Vespucio Norte-bound train on the median of the Route 5 (Pan-American Highway)

Overview
- Status: Operational
- Owner: Empresa de Transporte de Pasajeros Metro S.A.
- Locale: Santiago, Chile
- Termini: Vespucio Norte; Hospital El Pino
- Stations: 26

Service
- Type: Rubber-tyred metro
- System: Santiago Metro
- Services: 1
- Operator: Empresa de Transporte de Pasajeros Metro S.A.
- Depot: Near Lo Ovalle
- Rolling stock: Alsthom Groupe Brissonneau NS 74, Alstom Metropolis NS 2004 and NS 2016
- Daily ridership: 325,400 (2015)

History
- Opened: March 31, 1978; 48 years ago
- Last extension: 2023

Technical
- Line length: 25.9 km (16.1 mi)
- Character: Open-cut (Santa Ana, Toesca, Rondizzoni; Elevated (Parque O'Higgins); Underground (remainder of line)
- Track gauge: 1,435 mm (4 ft 8 1/2 in) standard gauge
- Electrification: 750 V DC third rail (guide bars)
- Operating speed: 75 km/h (47 mph)
Route map

Santiago Metro Line 2 is one of the seven rapid transit lines that currently make up the Santiago Metro network in Santiago, Chile. It has 26 stations and 25.9 km (16.1 mi) of track. The line intersects with Line 1 at Los Héroes, with the Line 3 at Puente Cal y Canto, with Line 4A at La Cisterna, with Line 5 at Santa Ana, and Line 6 at Franklin. It will also intersect with the future Line 7 and Line 9 at Puente Cal y Canto. Its distinctive colour on the network line map is banana yellow.

In 2015, Line 2 accounted for 18.8% of all trips made on the metro with a daily ridership of 325,400.

== History ==
The first section on Line 2 opened to the public on March 31, 1978 running between Los Héroes and Franklin. Later the same year, in December, the next section opened running between Franklin and Lo Ovalle.

Plans for an extension southeast towards Rodrigo de Araya were postponed after a major earthquake in 1985; in fact, only two stations opened separately at the line's northern end in 1987 (Santa Ana and Puente Cal y Canto). Two decades later, with a change of plans, it was decided that Line 2 would continue northwards instead of southeast, owing to recent availability of Tunnel Boring Machines, and on September 8, 2004, two further stations opened to the north, Patronato and Cerro Blanco. These stations marked a new feat in Santiago and overall Chilean engineering by building under the Mapocho River and the Costanera Norte freeway. That year, the line was also extended to the south with the opening of El Parrón and La Cisterna.

Another section opened in the north on November 25, 2005, running from Cerro Blanco station to Einstein station. Finally, on December 22, 2006, the three most recent stations opened: Vespucio Norte, Zapadores and Dorsal.

On October 26, 2009, the express service began to run on Line 2, stopping at certain stations only at peak times, allowing for faster journeys.

On November 2, 2017, Line 6 opened to the public, intersecting Line 2 at Franklin. And, on January 22, 2019, Line 3 opened, intersecting with Line 2 at Puente Cal y Canto.

In October 2019, a series of protests resulted in damage to the metro network. Line 2 was closed because of a fire in the mezzanine of Vespucio Norte on October 18, which resulted in moderate damage; a few other stations on Line 2 suffered minor damage. Service on the line was partly restored on October 25 with trains running express between La Cisterna and Zapadores. Full service was restored to Line 2 on November 11. The protests didn't affect the works on the southward extension to San Bernardo.

On 27 November 2023, a 5.2 km southward extension of Line 2 was inaugurated, adding 4 new stations to the line, and connecting the rail network to the communes of El Bosque and San Bernardo.

== Communes served by Line 2 ==
This line serves the following communes from North to South:

- Huechuraba (limit)
- Recoleta
- Independencia
- Santiago
- San Miguel
- La Cisterna
- El Bosque
- San Bernardo (limit)

== Tren Expreso (Express Service) ==

The skip-stop express service works during peak hours and allows trains (which have a light to show it's colour) to stop at alternate stations corresponding their colour, reducing the number of stops and the duration of journeys. The stations on the line are divided into “green route” stations, “red route” stations and “common” stations (Spanish: estación común), where all trains stop and allow passengers to switch between red and green routes. The express service works from Monday to Friday, between 6am - 9am and 6pm - 9pm.

=== Red Route Stations ===
- Dorsal
- Cementerios
- Patronato
- Parque O'Higgins
- El Llano
- Lo Vial
- Ciudad Del Niño
- El Bosque
- Copa Lo Martínez

=== Green Route Stations ===
- Einstein
- Cerro Blanco
- Toesca
- Rondizzoni
- San Miguel
- Departamental
- El Parrón
- Observatorio

=== Common Stations ===
There are 8 stations where both red and green route trains stop. They are the busiest stations and give commuters the chance to change between routes.

- Vespucio Norte
- Zapadores
- Puente Cal y Canto
- Santa Ana
- Los Héroes
- Franklin
- Lo Ovalle
- La Cisterna
- Hospital El Pino

== Stations ==
Line 2 stations from east to west are:

Stations	Transfers	Location	Opening	Commune	Notes
Vespucio Norte	Red Metropolitana de Movilidad	Av. Americo Vespucio Norte/Principal Ignacio Carrera Pinto	December 21, 2006	Huechuraba/Recoleta	
Zapadores		Av. Recoleta/Av. Zapadores	December 21, 2006	Recoleta	
Dorsal		Av. Recoleta/Av. Dorsal	December 21, 2006	Recoleta	
Einstein		Av. Recoleta/Av. Einstein	November 25, 2005	Recoleta	
Cementerios		Av. Recoleta/Av. Arzobispo Valdivieso	November 25, 2005	Recoleta	
Cerro Blanco		Av. Recoleta/Av. Santos Dumont	September 8, 2004	Recoleta	
Patronato		Av. Recoleta/Av. Santa Filomena	September 8, 2004	Recoleta	
Puente Cal y Canto	Santiago Metro Line 3	Bandera/Av. Balmaceda	September 15, 1987	Independencia/Recoleta/Santiago	This station will be a future transfer with the planned lines in 2028 and in 2032
Santa Ana	Santiago Metro Line 5	Av. Manuel Rodriguez/Catedral	September 15, 1987	Santiago	
Los Héroes	Santiago Metro Line 1	Av. Manuel Rodriguez/Av. Lib. Bdo. O'Higgins	March 31, 1978	Santiago	
Toesca		Av. Presidente Jorge Alessandri/Toesca	March 31, 1978	Santiago	
Parque O'Higgins		Av. Presidente Jorge Alessandri/Av. Manuel Antonio Matta	March 31, 1978	Santiago	
Rondizzoni		Av. Presidente Jorge Alessandri/Av. Rondizzoni	March 31, 1978	Santiago	
Franklin	Santiago Metro Line 6	Placer/Av. Nataniel Cox	March 31, 1978	Santiago/San Miguel	
El Llano		Gran Avenida José Miguel Carrera/Av. José Joaquín Vallejos	December 21, 1978	San Miguel	
San Miguel		Gran Avenida José Miguel Carrera/Curiñanca	December 21, 1978	San Miguel	
Lo Vial		Gran Avenida José Miguel Carrera/Av. Blanco Viel	December 21, 1978	San Miguel	
Departamental		Gran Avenida José Miguel Carrera/Carlos Edwards	December 21, 1978	San Miguel	
Ciudad del Niño		Gran Avenida José Miguel Carrera/Varas Mena	December 21, 1978	San Miguel	
Lo Ovalle	Red Metropolitana de Movilidad	Gran Avenida José Miguel Carrera/Carvajal	December 21, 1978	La Cisterna	
El Parrón		Gran Avenida José Miguel Carrera/Av. El Parrón	December 22, 2004	La Cisterna	
La Cisterna	Santiago Metro Line 4A	Gran Avenida José Miguel Carrera/Av. Américo Vespucio Sur	December 22, 2004	La Cisterna	
El Bosque		Av. Padre Hurtado/Riquelme	November 27, 2023	La Cisterna/El Bosque	
Observatorio		Av. Padre Hurtado/Av. Observatorio	November 27, 2023	El Bosque	
Copa Lo Martínez		Av. Padre Hurtado/Av. Lo Martínez	November 27, 2023	El Bosque	
Hospital El Pino		Av. Padre Hurtado/Av. Lo Blanco	November 27, 2023	El Bosque/San Bernardo	

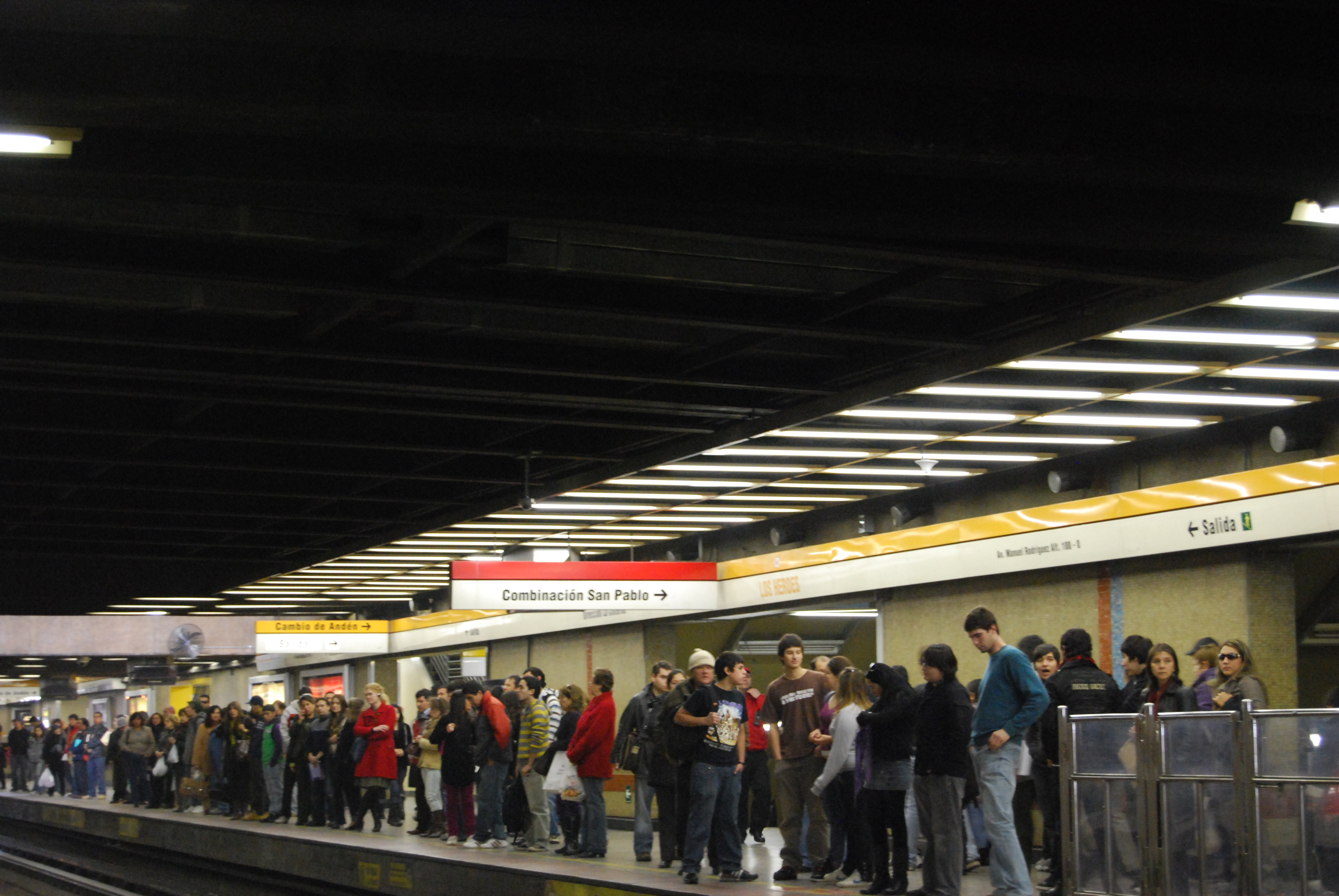
Los Héroes metro station on a busy day

== Line 2 data sheet ==
- Terminal Communes:
  - Recoleta
  - Santiago
  - San Miguel
  - La Cisterna
  - El Bosque
- Track:
  - Americo Vespucio Avenue: 1 Station
  - Recoleta Avenue: 6 stations
  - Presidente Balmaceda Avenue: 1 station
  - Manuel Rodríguez Avenue: 3 stations
  - Viel Avenue: 2 station
  - Nataniel Cox Street: 1 station
  - José Miguel Carrera Grand Avenue: 8 stations
  - Padre Hurtado Avenue: 4 stations
- Construction methods:
  - Hospital El Pino - Franklin: Underground.
  - Rondizzoni: Trench
  - Parque O'Higgins: Raised embankment.
  - North of Parque O'Higgins: Viaduct.
  - Toesca: Trench.
  - Los Héroes: Underground.
  - Santa Ana: Trench.
  - Puente Cal y Canto - Vespucio Norte: Underground.
- Opening dates:
  - Los Héroes– Franklin: March 1978
  - Franklin – Lo Ovalle: December 1978
  - Los Héroes - Puente Cal y Canto: September 1987
  - Puente Cal y Canto – Cerro Blanco: September 2004
  - Lo Ovalle – La Cisterna: December 2004
  - Cerro Blanco – Einstein: November 2005
  - Einstein – Vespucio Norte : December 2006
  - La Cisterna - Hospital El Pino: November 2023

== See also ==
- List of metro systems
- Rail transport in Chile
- Transantiago
- Rubber-tyred metro
