= El Bosque, Chile =

El Bosque
- Commune
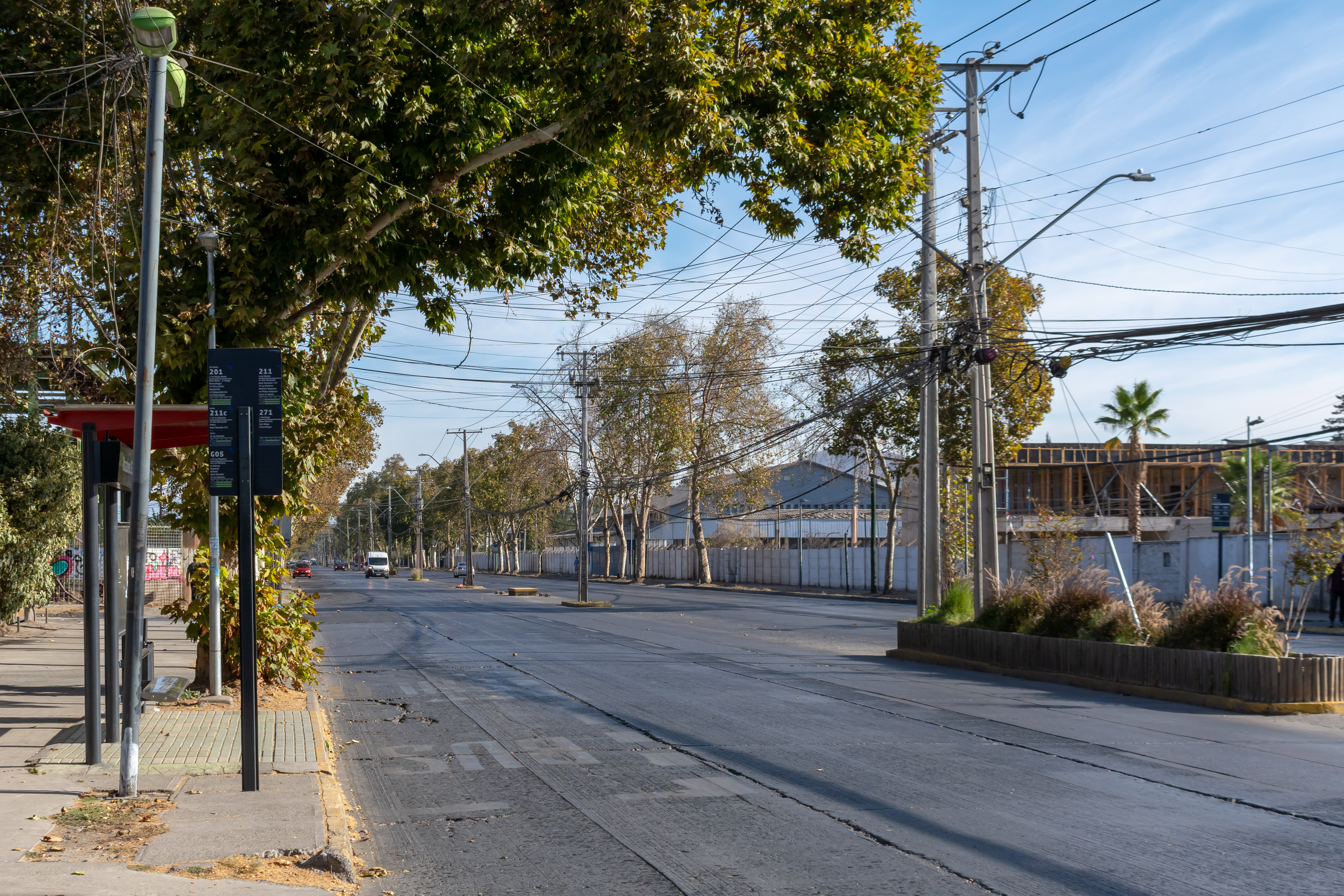
- Gran Avenida José Miguel Carrera

- Map of El Bosque commune in Greater Santiago Location in Chile
- Coordinates (city): 33°34′0″S 70°40′30″W
- Chile: Chile
- Region: Santiago
- Province: Santiago
- Founded: 28 November 1981

Government
  - Type: Municipality
  - Alcalde: Sadi Melo Moya (PS)

Area
  - Total: 14.1 km^{2} (5.4 sq mi)
- Elevation: 587 m (1,926 ft)

Population (2024)
  - Total: 155,257
  - Density: 11,000/km^{2} (28,500/sq mi)
  - Urban: 155,257
  - Rural: 0
- Time zone: UTC-4 (CLT)
  - Summer (DST): UTC-3 (CLST)
- Website: Municipality of El Bosque

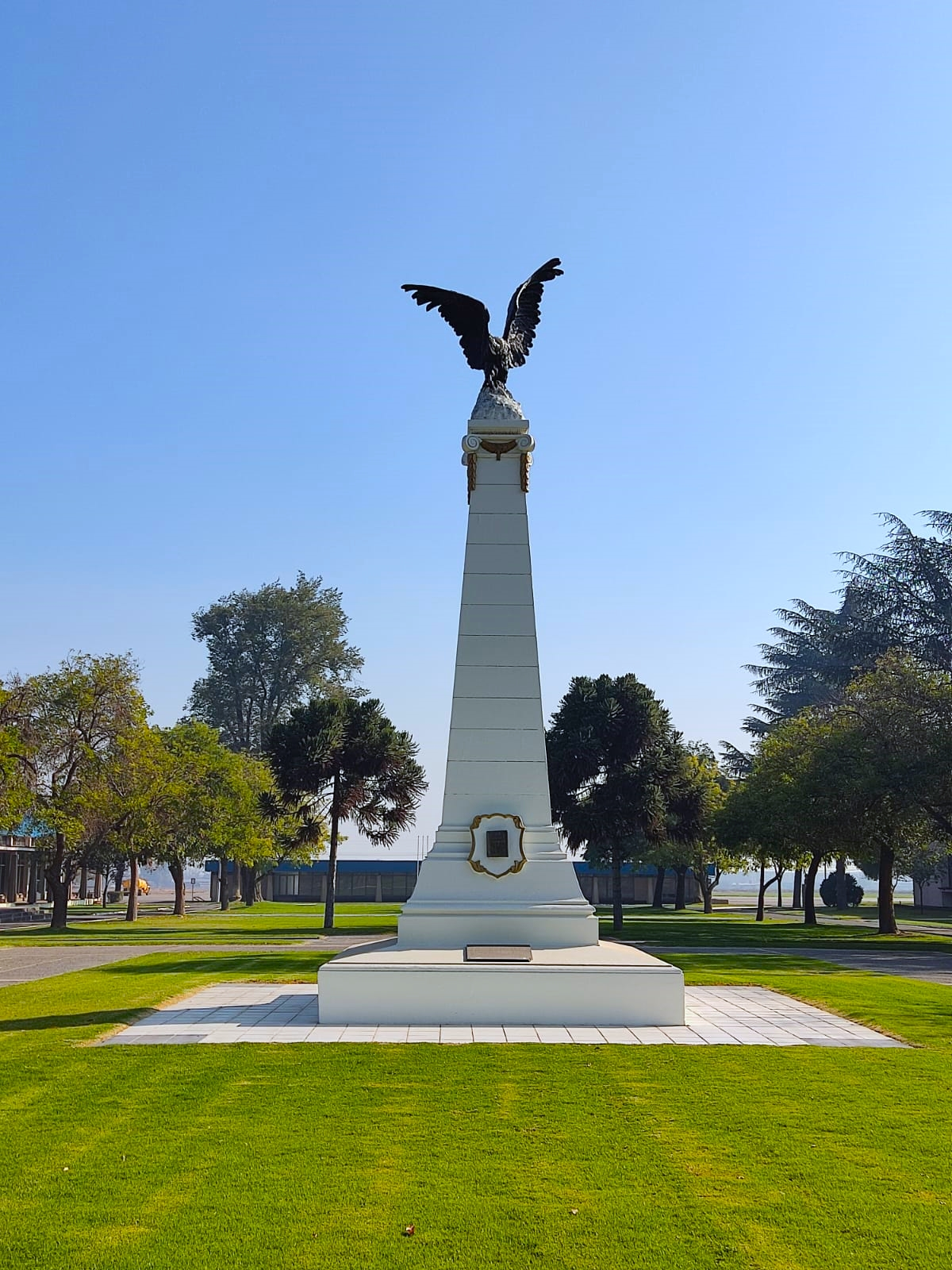
Martyrs of the chilean aircraft monument

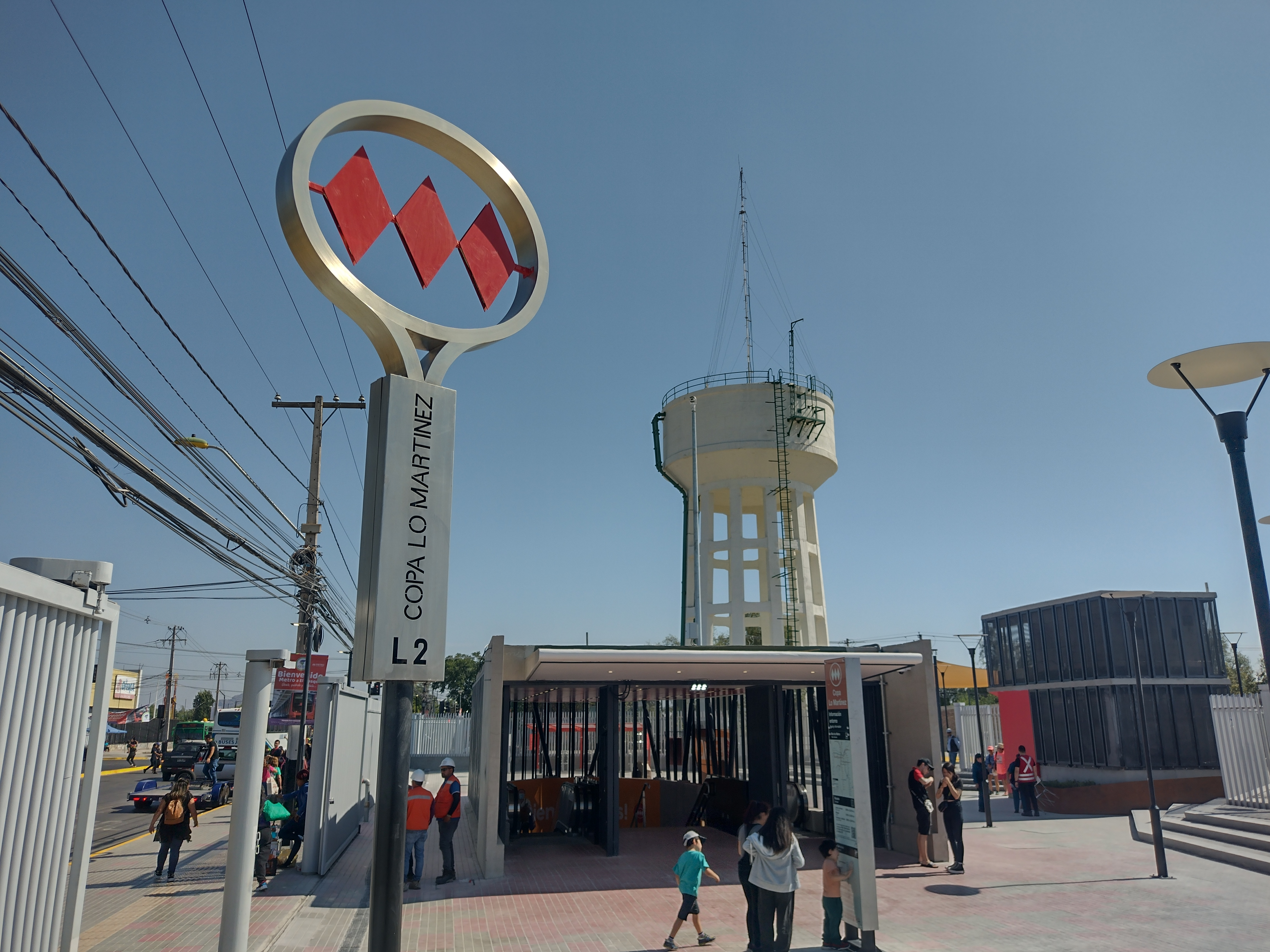
Copa Lo Martínez metro station

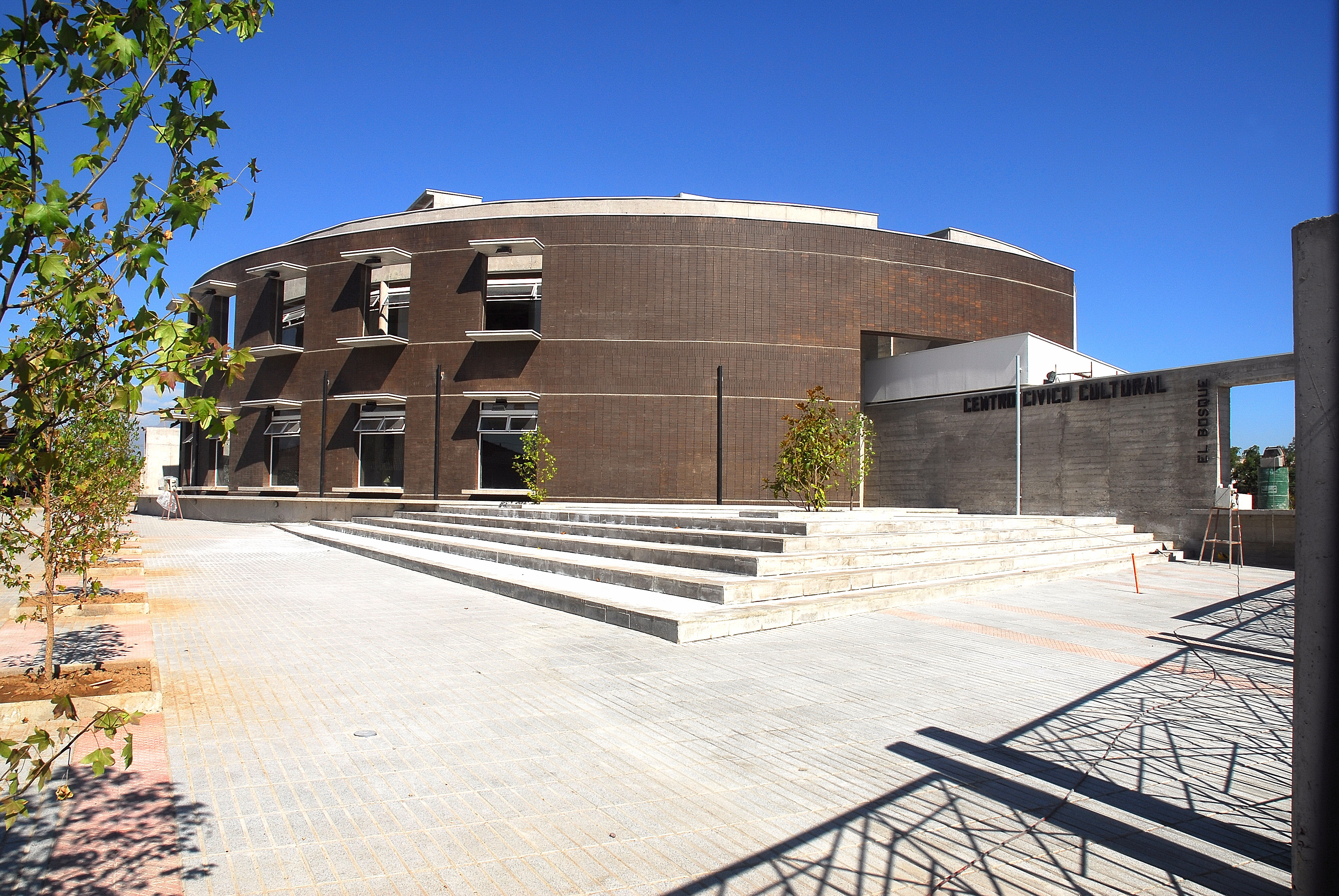
Civic and Cultural Center

El Bosque (Spanish for "The Forest") is a commune in the Santiago Province of the Santiago Metropolitan Region in Chile. With a population of 155,257 in an area of 14.1 km^{2} (5 sq mi), it is the 12th most densely populated commune in the country.

== Demographics ==
As of the 2024 census, the population is 155,257, of which 48.8% are male and 51.2% are female. People under 15 years old make up 17.7% of the population, and people over 65 years old make up 15.5%. 100% of the population is urban.

Historical population
Year	Pop.	±% p.a.
1970	89,030	—
1982	143,717	+4.07%
1992	172,854	+1.86%
2002	175,594	+0.16%
2017	162,505	−0.52%
2024	155,257	−0.65%
Source: INE, Memoria Chilena

- Regional quality of life index: 73.65, medium, 28 out of 52 (2005)
- Human Development Index: 0.711, 106 out of 341 (2003)

=== Immigration ===
As of the 2024 census, immigrants make up 7.3% of the population - 5.9% are from South America, 1.3% from North America, 0.04% from Europe, 0.07% from Asia, 0.005% from Africa, and 0.003% from Oceania.

== Administration ==
As a commune, El Bosque is a third-level administrative division of Chile administered by a municipal council, headed by an alcalde who is directly elected every four years. The 2024-2028 mayor is Sadi Melo Moya (PS). The communal council has the following members:

- Simón Melo Contreras (PS)
- Lorena Downey Belmar (PS)
- Nicol Sepúlveda Hernández (PS)
- Patricia del Carmen Coñoman Carrillo (PCCh)
- Carlos Contreras Muñoz (RN)
- Rafael Valenzuela Pérez (REP)
- Rosa Peralta Valenzuela (REP)
- Patricia Arriagada Núñez (UDI)

Within the electoral divisions of Chile, El Bosque is represented in the Chamber of Deputies by Tucapel Jiménez (PPD) and Iván Moreira (UDI) as part of the 27th electoral district, (together with La Cisterna and San Ramón). The commune is represented in the Senate by Soledad Alvear Valenzuela (PDC) and Pablo Longueira Montes (UDI) as part of the 8th senatorial constituency (Santiago-East).

== Transport ==
The El Bosque airport is a military airport located in the commune.
