= Autopista Central =

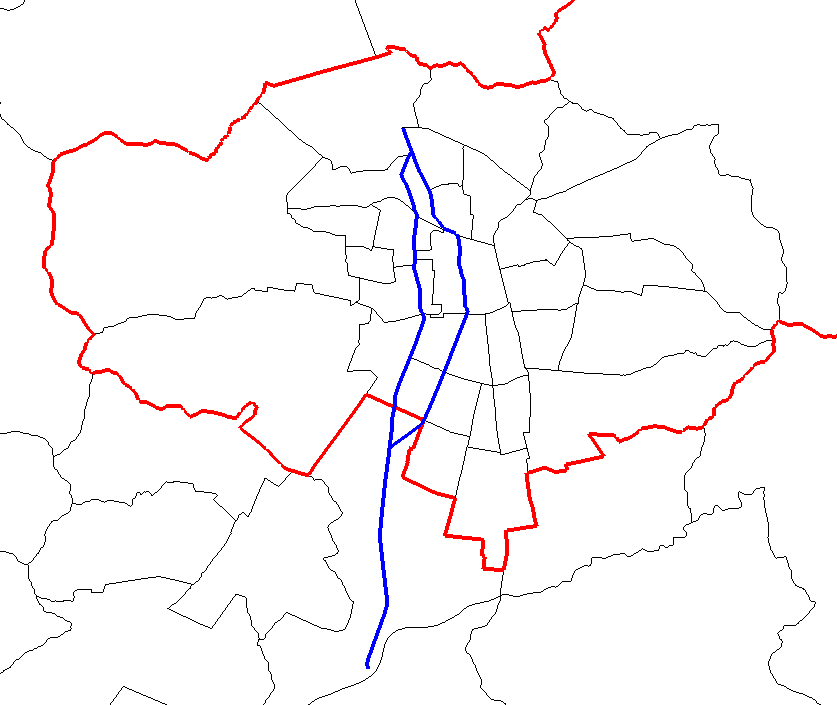
Map of Autopista Central in blue, with communal borders in black and Santiago Province in red.

Autopista Central ("Central Highway", in Spanish) is a privatized, partially submerged highway in Chile forming part of the Ruta 5. It forms part of the urban highway network of Santiago, all of which incorporate a free flow toll system. Out of these highways it is the longest, with a length of 60.5 km (37.6 mi).

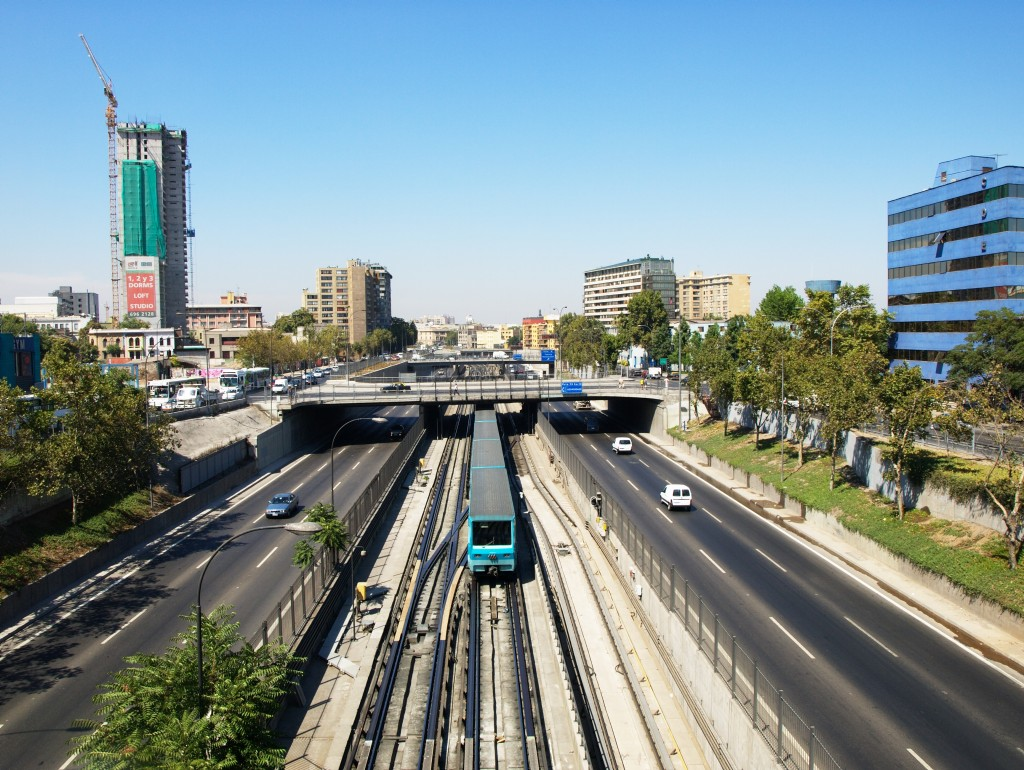
Santiago Metro Line 2 which runs in parallel for part of the route

Within the network the Autopista Central forms the primary north–south connection through the centre of the city, the northern terminus is at the interchange with Vespucio Norte Express, where it continues northward as Autopista del Aconcagua. The southern terminus is located immediately north of the Maipo River, after which it continues as Autopista del Maipo.

Autopista Central really consists of two highways: The main section runs the full length of the route, and the second, called "Eje General Velásquez", runs further to the west, bypassing the downtown districts. The western route has a length of about 21 km (13 mi), duplicating the route between the municipalities of El Bosque and Conchali.

The eastern highway is the section of Chile Route 5 that traverses Santiago.

== History ==
The Avenida Norte-Sur, a predecessor road of Autopista Central, was the first urban highway built in Chile.The construction of that 5.5-kilometre (3.4 mi) long highway began in 1966.The northern portion of the road was built in an open cut. Previously, many city blocks of downtown Santiago were cleared of buildings. Part of the removed earth was used to create an embankment on the south bank of the Mapocho River, which was planned to carry the tracks of a new railroad running to the Estación Mapocho, but the project was never executed.

== Bibliography ==
- Parrochia, Juan (1979). Santiago en el tercer cuarto del S.XX : el transporte metropolitano en Chile, realizaciones de metro y vialidad urbana (in Spanish). Universidad de Chile.
