= Lo Ovalle metro station =

Santiago metro station

Lo Ovalle
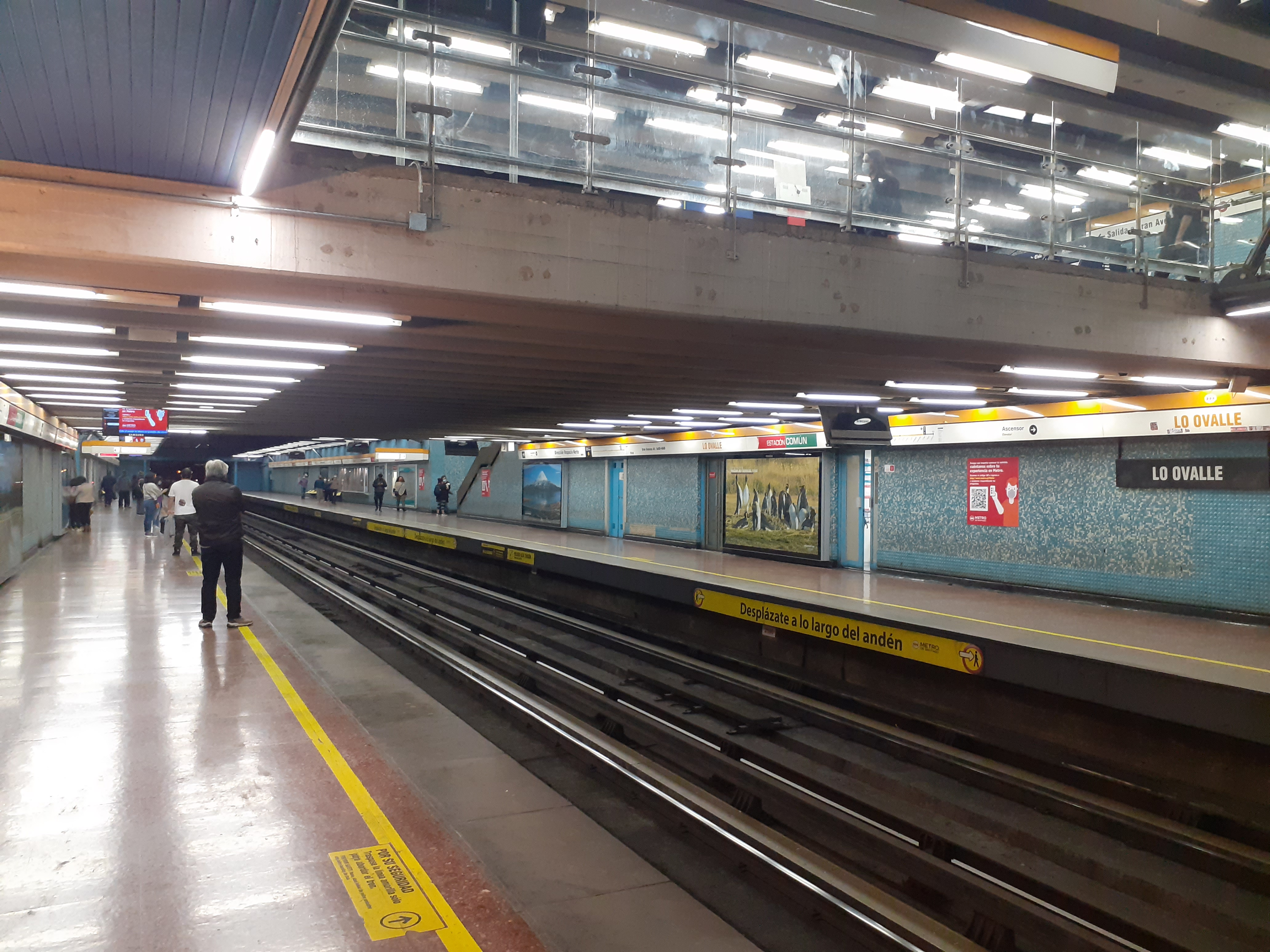
- Lo Ovalle station in 2020

General information
- Location: Gran Avenida / Carvajal Street
- Coordinates: 33°31′3.56″S 70°39′39.32″W
- System: Santiago rapid transit
- Line: Line 2
- Platforms: 2 side platforms
- Tracks: 2
- Connections: Transantiago buses

Construction
- Accessible: yes

History
- Opened: December 21, 1978

Services
Preceding station	Santiago Metro	Following station
Ciudad del Niño towards Vespucio Norte	Line 2	El Parrón towards Hospital El Pino
Location

Lo Ovalle is an underground metro station on Line 2 of the Santiago Metro, in Santiago, Chile. The station was opened on 21 December 1978 as the southern terminus of the extension of the line from Franklin. On 22 December 2004 the line was extended further south to La Cisterna.

The station was the southern terminus for a quarter-century prior to inaugurating the Line 2 expansion to La Cisterna. Nevertheless, it still remains a key transit hub for many South and Western Santiago commuters.
