= Franklin metro station =

Santiago metro station

Franklin
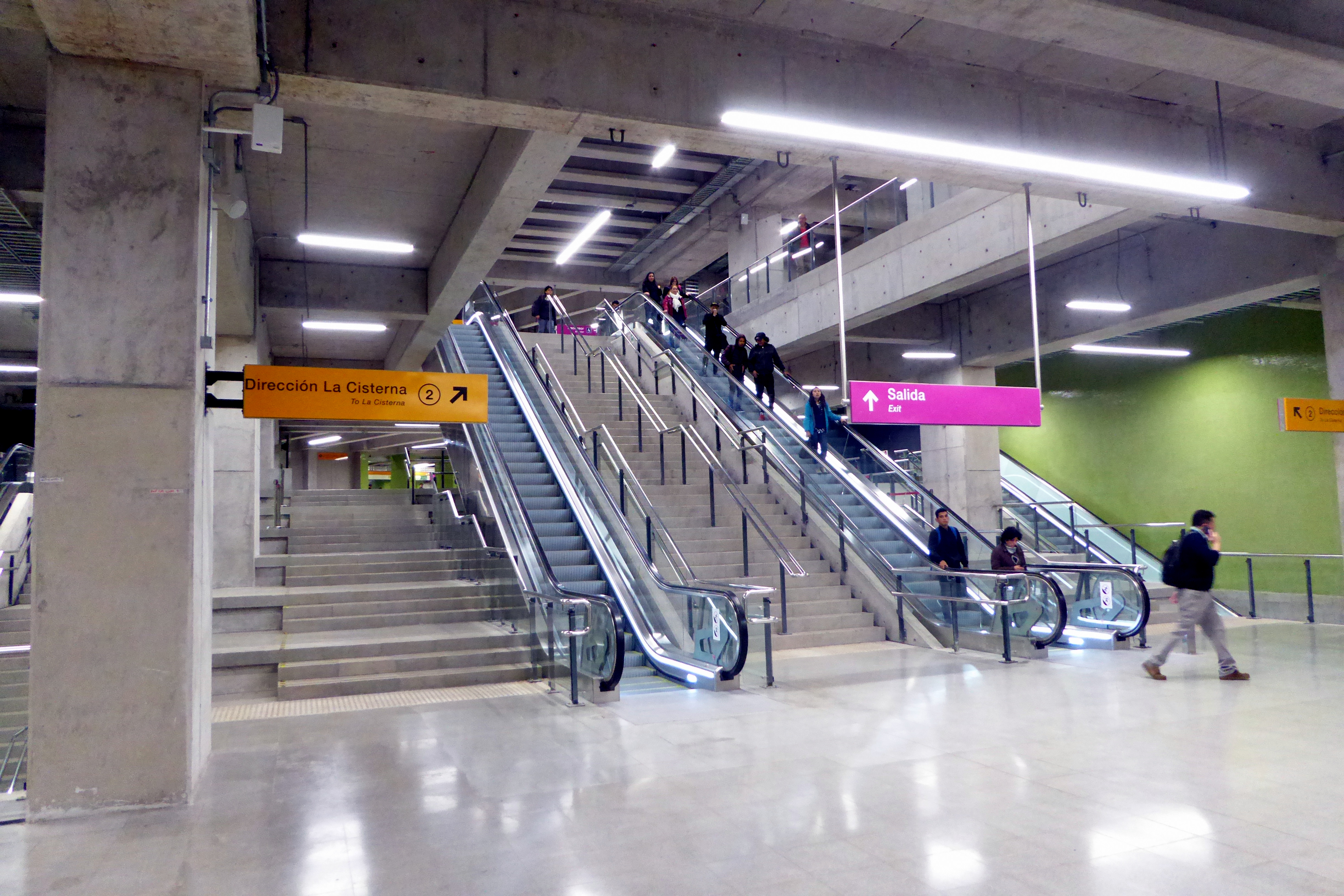
- Mesanina of combination in Franklin station, between Line 2 and Line 6 of the Metro of Santiago.

General information
- Location: Nataniel Cox Street / Placer Street
- Coordinates: 33°28′32.96″S 70°38′57.81″W
- System: Santiago rapid transit
- Lines: Line 2 Line 6
- Platforms: 2 side platforms
- Tracks: 2
- Connections: Transantiago buses

Construction
- Accessible: yes

History
- Opened: March 31, 1978; November 2, 2017

Services
Preceding station	Santiago Metro	Following station
Rondizzoni towards Vespucio Norte	Line 2	El Llano towards Hospital El Pino
Presidente Pedro Aguirre Cerda towards Cerrillos	Line 6	Bío Bío towards Los Leones
Location

Franklin is a transfer station between the Line 2 and Line 6 of the Santiago Metro. Their namesake is the Franklin Neighborhood. The Line 2 station was opened on 31 March 1978 as the southern terminus of the inaugural section of the line, from Los Héroes. On 21 December 1978, the line was extended to Lo Ovalle. The Line 6 station was opened on 2 November 2017 as part of the inaugural section of the line, between Cerrillos and Los Leones.

The station has a central mezzanine on the first level down containing turnstiles and a ticket booth. Stairs at the two northernmost corners of the mezzanine provide access to the platform level, whereas at south end of the mezzanine, one stair per platform go up to it.

A passageway connects the mezzanine's east end to the only access to the station. The original entrance pavilion was replaced by the current more modest structure. It features two parallel escalators, one up and the other down, which are separated by a central unused space that is provisioned to accommodate two additional escalators. The escalators are flanked by two staircases.

== Gallery ==
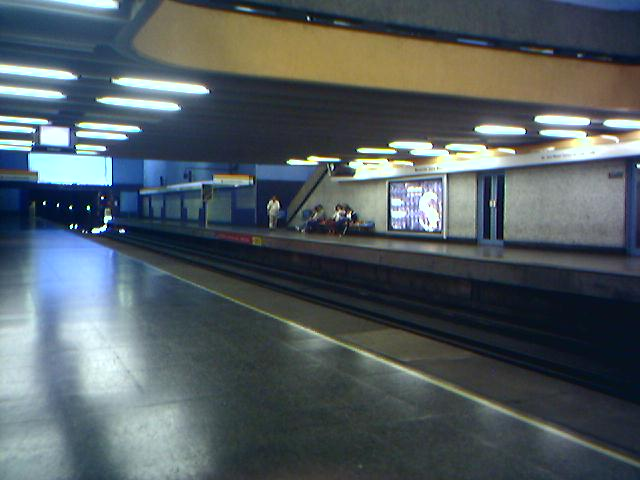
Platform of the station on Line 2.

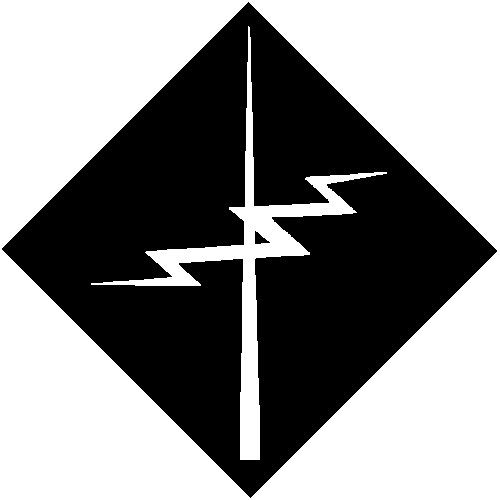
Old stationery symbol.

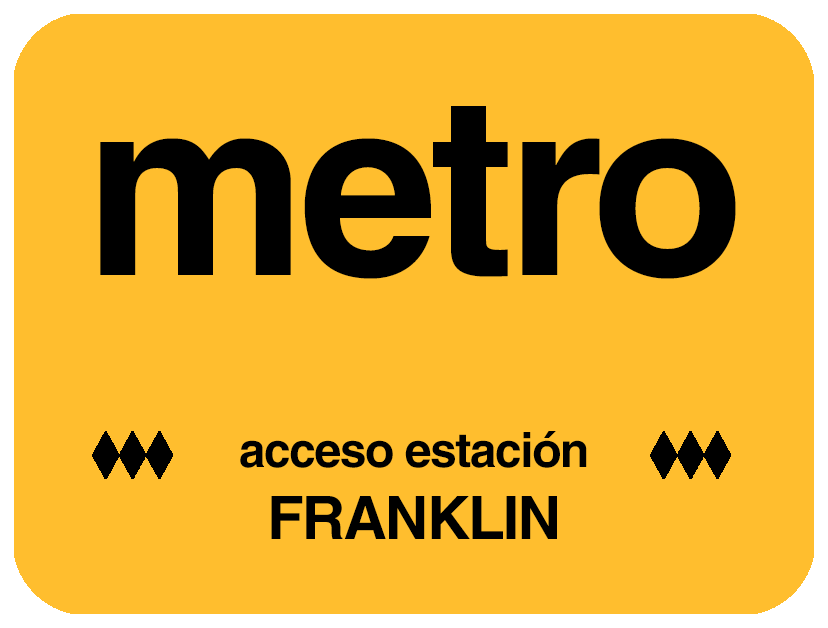
Sign used in access to the station until 1997.

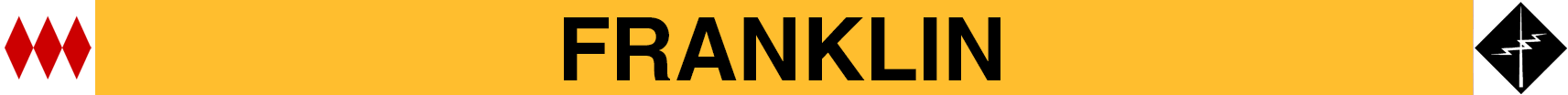
Antique valance used on platforms.

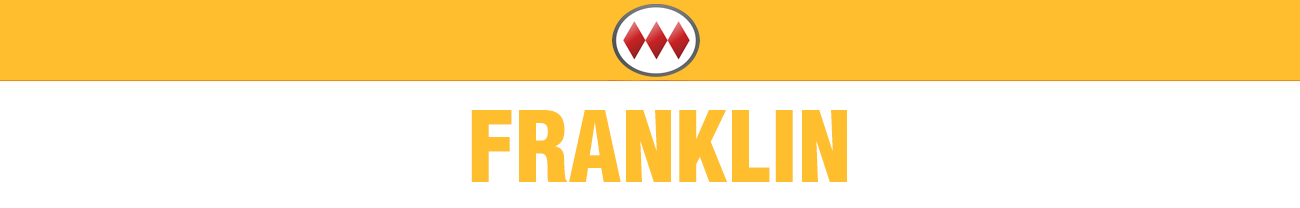
Valance currently used on the platforms in Line 2.

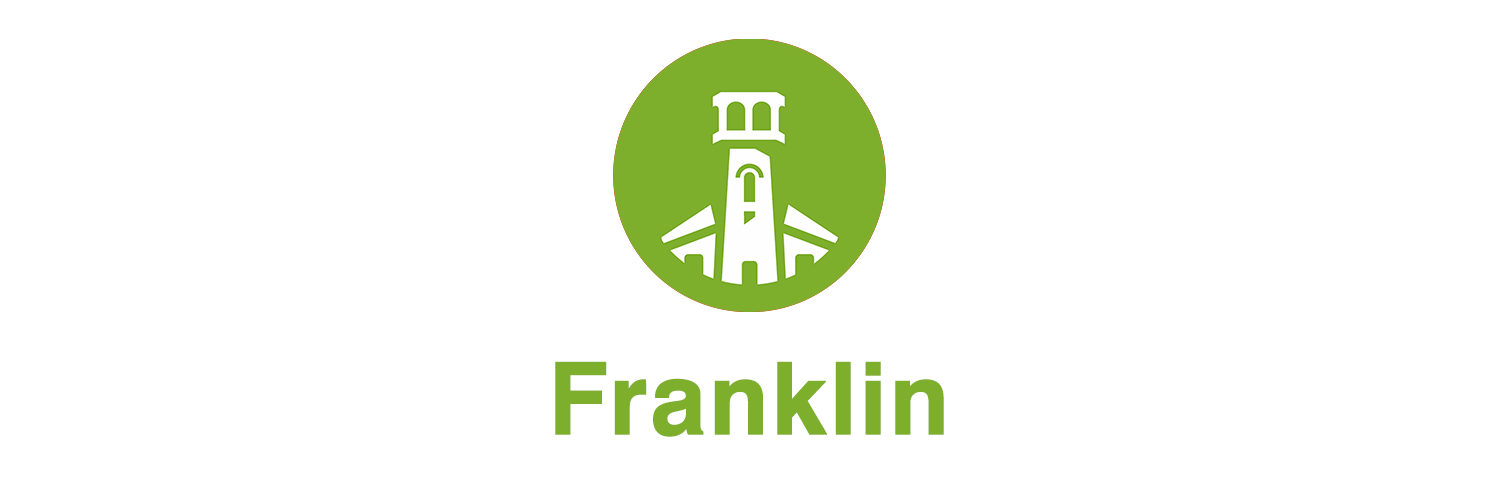
Valance currently used on the platforms in Line 6.
