= Hospital El Pino metro station =

Santiago metro station

Hospital El Pino
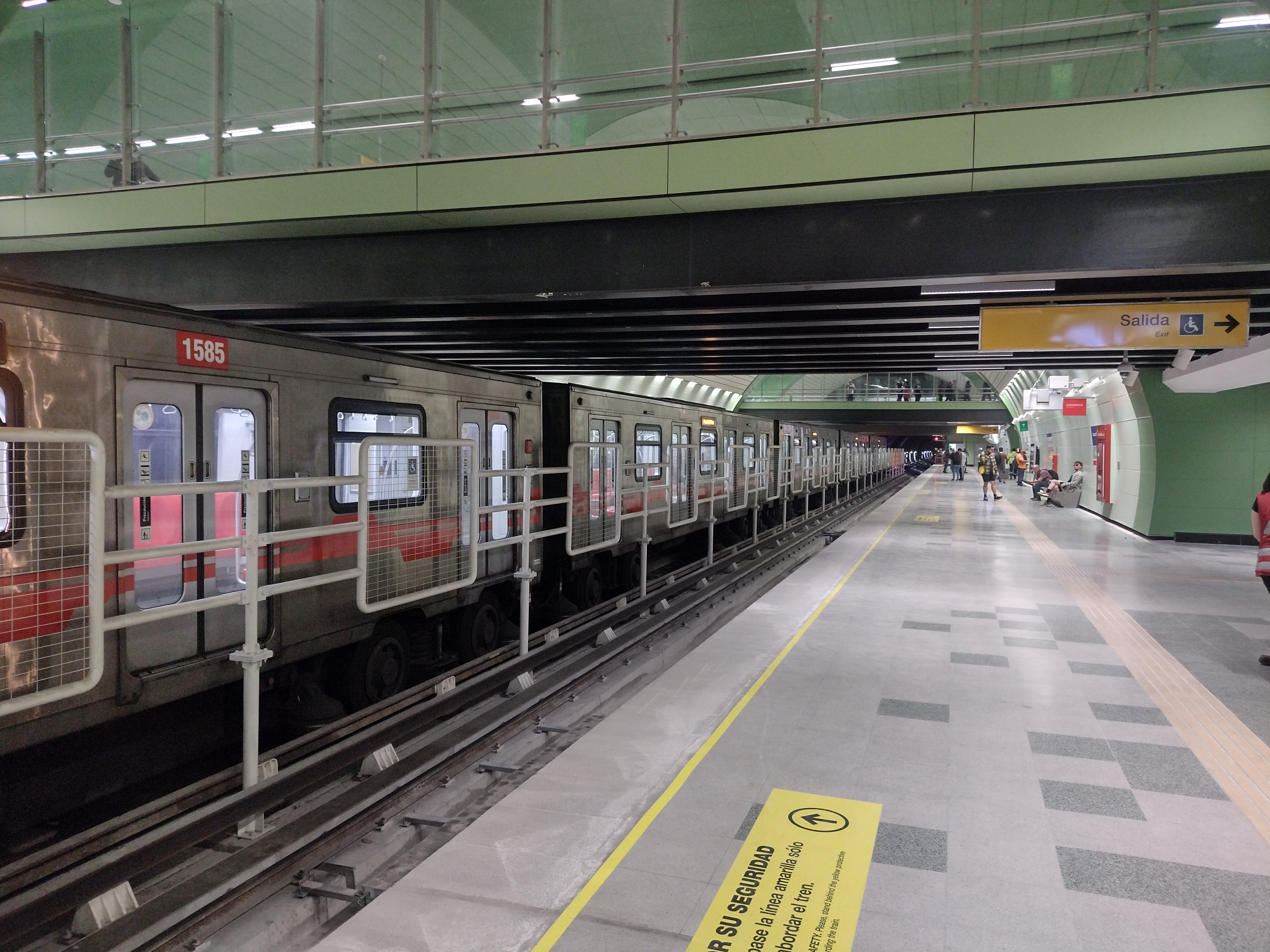

General information
- Location: Padre Hurtado/Lo Blanco Avenues
- Coordinates: 33°34′58″S 70°40′35″W
- System: Santiago rapid transit
- Line: Line 2
- Platforms: 2 side platforms
- Tracks: 2
- Connections: Red buses

Construction
- Accessible: yes

History
- Opened: 27 November 2023

Services
| Preceding station | Santiago Metro | Following station |
|---|---|---|
| Copa Lo Martínez towards Vespucio Norte | Line 2 | Terminus |
Location

Hospital El Pino is an underground metro station and the southern terminal station of Line 2 of the Santiago Metro network, in Santiago, Chile.

The station opened on 27 November 2023 as part of the southern Line 2 extension alongside Hospital El Pino.
