= Vespucio Norte metro station =

Santiago metro station

Vespucio Norte
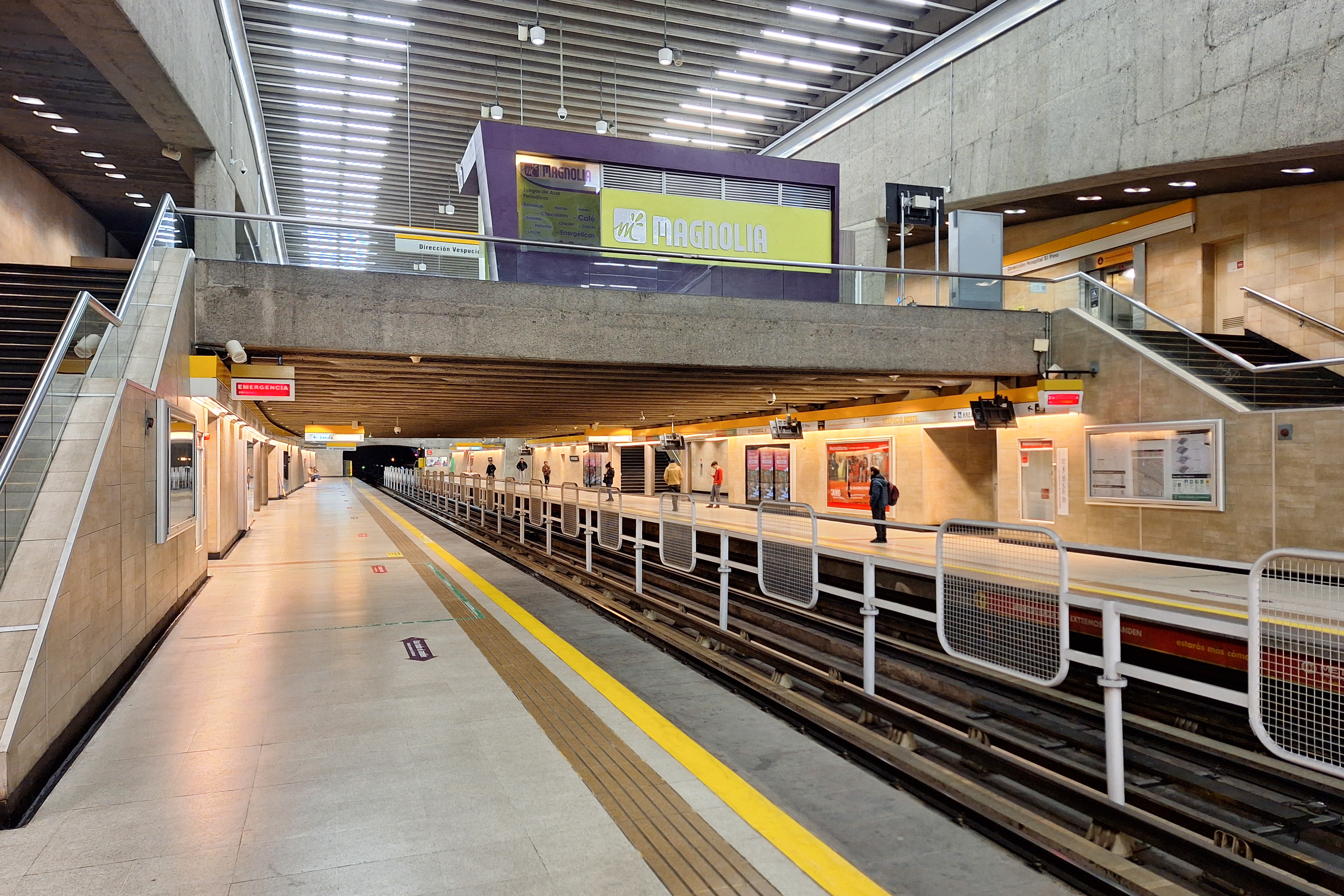

General information
- Location: Américo Vespucio Avenue / Principal Capitán Ignacio Carrera Pinto Avenue
- Coordinates: 33°22′52.18″S 70°38′40.30″W
- System: Santiago rapid transit
- Line: Line 2
- Platforms: 2 side platforms
- Tracks: 2
- Connections: Transantiago buses

Construction
- Accessible: yes

History
- Opened: December 21, 2006

Services
Preceding station	Santiago Metro	Following station
Terminus	Line 2	Zapadores towards Hospital El Pino
Location

Vespucio Norte is an underground metro station on the Line 2 of the Santiago Metro, in Santiago, Chile. It is the northern terminus of the Line 2 and provides 120 underground parking spaces. The station was opened on 21 December 2006 as part of the extension of the line from Einstein.

The station is located on the south side of the Vespucio Norte Express freeway, within the borders of Recoleta, as well as serving nearby Huechuraba indirectly.

== Structure ==
The station has two side platforms and two tracks. At the center of the station a large mezzanine, without central support, spans over tracks and platforms, all of which are surmounted by a longitudinally curved ceiling.

A very long pavilion, which features an irregularly sawtooth shaped roof, houses the entrances to the station and is connected to a bus terminal.
