= Republica station =

Republica station or República station could refer to the following:

- República (São Paulo Metro), Brazil
- República metro station (Santiago), Chile
- Republica metro station, Romania
- Repubblica – Teatro dell'Opera (Rome Metro), Italy
