= Universidad de Santiago metro station =

Santiago metro station

Universidad de Santiago
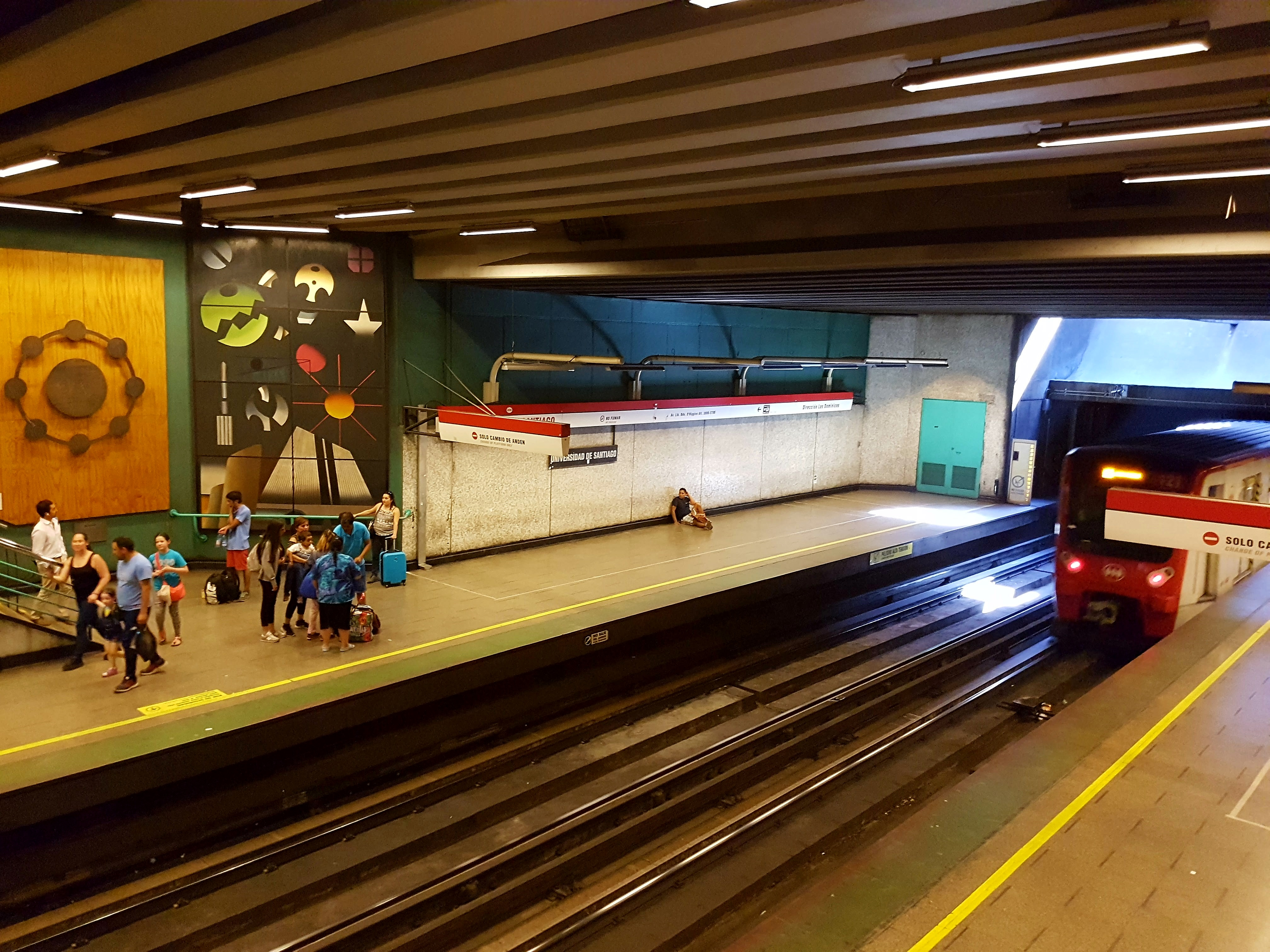
- A train arriving at the Universidad de Santiago station.

General information
- Location: Alameda / Jotabeche Street
- Coordinates: 33°27′10″S 70°41′10″W
- System: Santiago rapid transit
- Line: Line 1
- Platforms: 2 side platforms
- Tracks: 2
- Connections: Transantiago buses

History
- Opened: September 15, 1975

Services
Preceding station	Santiago Metro	Following station
San Alberto Hurtado towards San Pablo	Line 1	Estación Central towards Los Dominicos
Location

Universidad de Santiago is an underground metro station on the Line 1 of the Santiago Metro, in Santiago, Chile. Is named for the nearby University of Santiago. The station is adjacent to the Evangelical Cathedral of Santiago and to the main bus stations in the city. It was opened on 15 September 1975 as part of the inaugural section of the line between San Pablo and La Moneda.

The station has a central mezzanine that overlooks the outer portions of the platform level. There is artwork on the walls of the four platforms stairways that honors the aforementioned university, which was unveiled on August 30, 2005.
