= Santiago Metro Line A =

Under-planning Santiago Metro line

Overview
- Status: Approved and under planning
- Owner: Empresa de Transporte de Pasajeros Metro S.A.
- Locale: Santiago
- Termini: Huelén; Aeropuerto Internacional Arturo Merino Benítez
- Stations: 2

Service
- Type: Light Rail
- System: Santiago Metro, Transantiago
- Services: 1
- Operator: Empresa de Transporte de Pasajeros Metro S.A.

History
- Planned opening: 2032

Technical
- Line length: 6.5 km (4.0 mi)
- Character: Underground

Line A is a planned light rail line of the Santiago Metro, whose construction is planned to begin in 2027 and whose opening is planned in 2032. It is intended to connect the Arturo Merino Benítez International Airport to Line 7 (which is under construction and planned to be opened in 2028) and to the rest of the metro network. It will add 2 new stations and 6.5 km (4.0 mi) of track to the metro system. It will start at the future Huelén interchange station in Cerro Navia, connecting it with Line 7, and will end in the northwest, at the future Aeropuerto Internacional Arturo Merino Benítez station of the airport in Pudahuel. When the line is opened, Santiago will become one of first cities in South America with a direct connection between its metro network and its international airport, after São Paulo/Guarulhos International Airport, Recife International Airport and Porto Alegre International Airport and the first outside Brazil. The entire line will be underground. Its distinctive color on the network line map is turquoise. The cost of construction has been set at $365 million USD.

== History ==
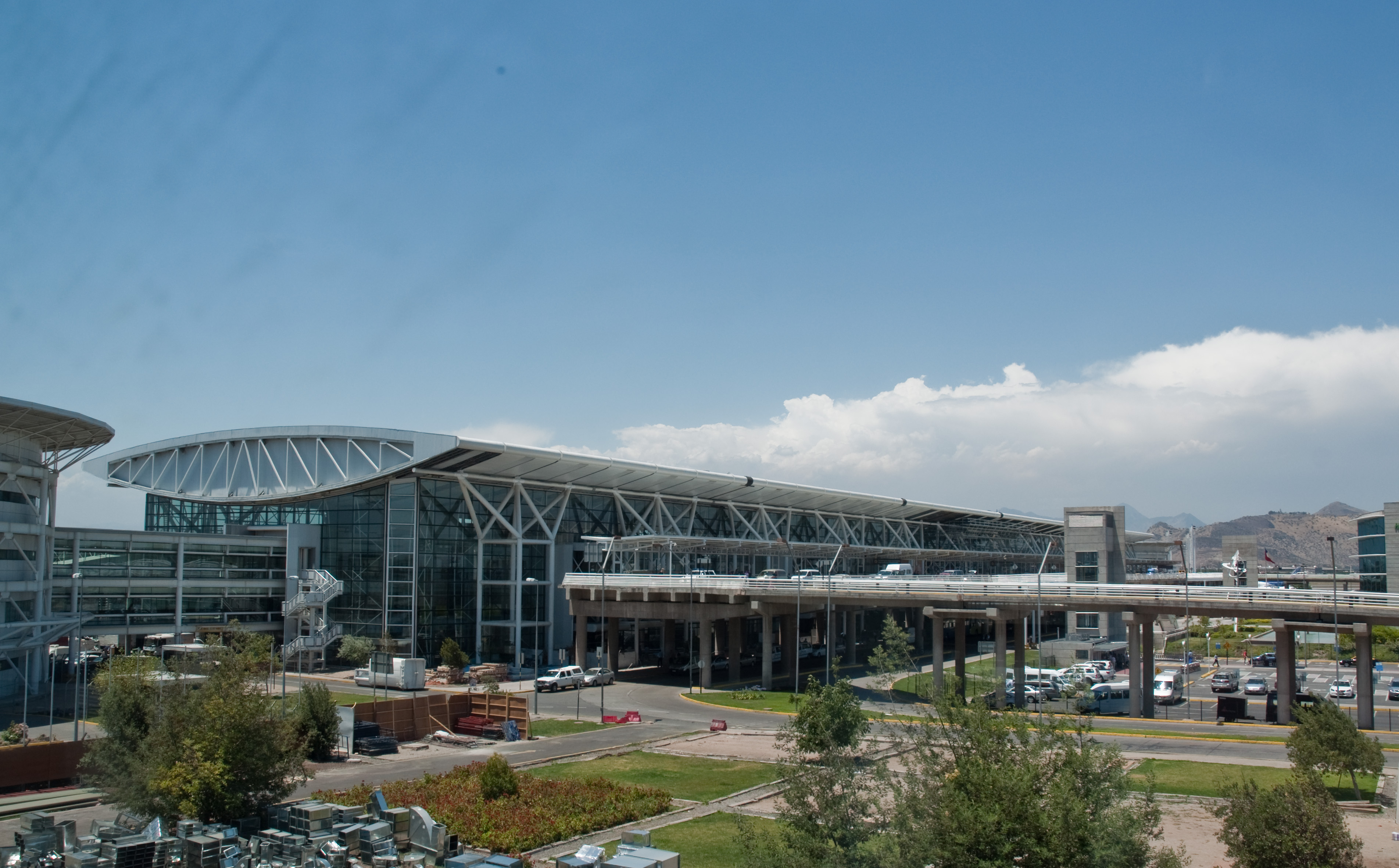
Arturo Merino Benítez International Airport

On May 14, 2025, the newspaper Diario Financiero reported that the President of Chile, Gabriel Boric, would announce in the public account of that year the project of a light rail that would connect the future Line 7 with the Arturo Merino Benítez International Airport. With an estimated length of 6.5 km (4.0 mi), the metro line would connect the airport with the future Huelén metro station located on Avenida Mapocho Sur in Cerro Navia in approximately 7 minutes.

Finally, before the National Congress of Chile, President Boric announced on June 1, 2025, the construction of Line A, which would be a light rail line connecting the country's main airport and the Huelén station of Line 7. The Minister of Transport and Telecommunications, Juan Carlos Muñoz, noted that the fare for Line A will be higher than the rest of the metro network (reaching approximately 3,000 Chilean pesos), the total investment will be approximately $365 million USD, and it is expected to be operational by 2032, carrying around 9.5 million passengers per year.

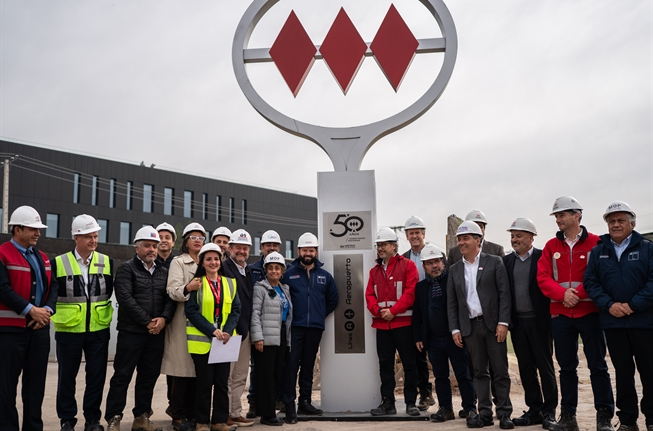
Presentation of Metro Line A in the Cerro Navia commune attended by President Gabriel Boric (centre) on June 2, 2025

On June 2, President Boric visited the municipality of Cerro Navia, where he and other authorities provided further details of the future Line A. He reported that the line will be 6.5 km (4.0 mi) long and will cross the Costanera Norte and Autopista Vespucio Norte Express highways. It will have two stations, one in each municipality, with platform screen doors and accessibility for the disabled. It will also meet the standards of the carriages currently operating on Lines 3 and 6, with automatic train operation, air conditioning, and onboard security cameras.

== Stations ==
Stations running from southeast to northwest

Stations (tentative name)	Transfers	Location	Opening	Commune
Huelén		Mapocho/Huelén	2032	Cerro Navia
Aeropuerto Internacional Arturo Merino Benítez		Arturo Merino Benítez International Airport	2032	Pudahuel
