= San Alberto Hurtado metro station =

Santiago metro station

San Alberto Hurtado
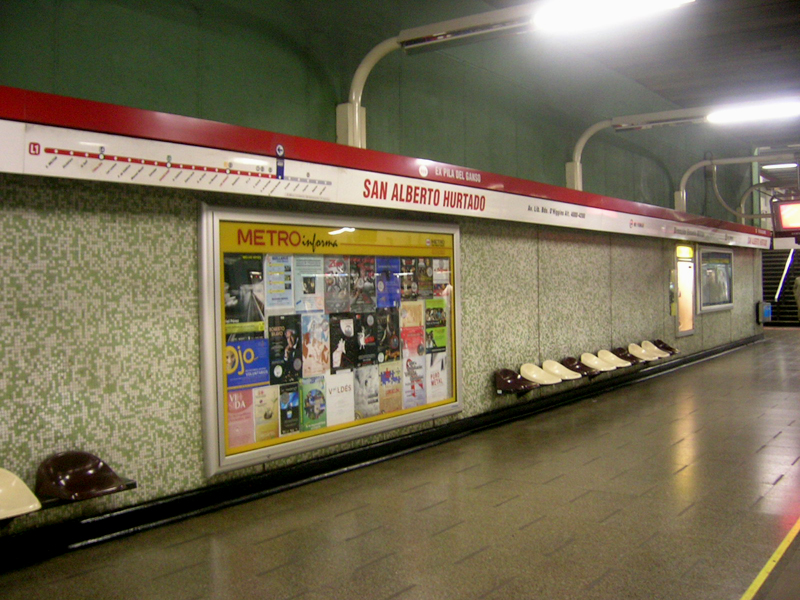

General information
- Location: Alameda / Toro Mazotte Street
- Coordinates: 33°27′15″S 70°41′32″W
- System: Santiago rapid transit
- Line: Line 1
- Platforms: 2 side platforms
- Tracks: 2
- Connections: Transantiago buses

History
- Opened: 15 September 1975
- Former names: Pila del Ganso (until 2005)

Services
Preceding station	Santiago Metro	Following station
Ecuador towards San Pablo	Line 1	Universidad de Santiago towards Los Dominicos
Location

San Alberto Hurtado, formerly known as Pila del Ganso, is a station on the Santiago Metro in Santiago, Chile. It is an underground station located between the stations Ecuador and Universidad de Santiago on the same line, below the Avenida Libertador General Bernardo O'Higgins and Toro Mazotte street, in the commune of Estación Central.

The station was opened on 15 September 1975 as part of the inaugural section of the line between San Pablo and La Moneda. It was opened under the name of Pila del Ganso, due to a decorative fountain located just above the station in the central reservation of the Alameda, close to Toro Mazotte street. In 2005, because of the recent canonization of Alberto Hurtado, the board of directors of Metro S.A. approved the change of name of the station to San Alberto Hurtado, whose sanctuary and Hogar de Cristo headquarters are located close to the station.
