= Unión Latinoamericana metro station =

Santiago metro station

Unión Latinoamericana
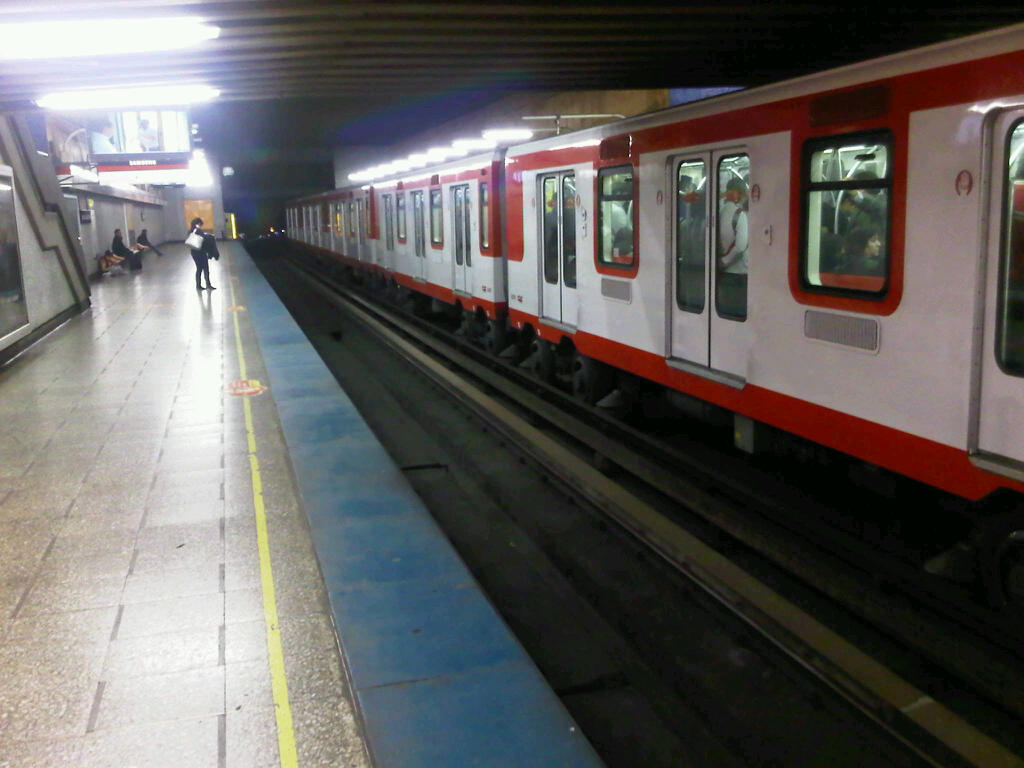

General information
- Location: Alameda / Unión Americana Street
- Coordinates: 33°26′59″S 70°40′27″W
- System: Santiago rapid transit
- Line: Line 1
- Platforms: 2 side platforms
- Tracks: 2
- Connections: Transantiago buses

History
- Opened: September 15, 1975

Services
Preceding station	Santiago Metro	Following station
Estación Central towards San Pablo	Line 1	República towards Los Dominicos
Location

Unión Latinoamericana, also known as ULA, is an underground metro station on the Line 1 of the Santiago Metro, in Santiago, Chile. It is close to Víctor Jara Stadium. The station was opened on 15 September 1975 as part of the inaugural section of the line between San Pablo and La Moneda.

It has a single mezzanine, which is accessed by four entrances via two corridors. There are stairs at the four corners of the mezzanine, which are used as one-way walkways, although the stairs that go from the paid area of the mezzanine to the platforms can be used in a reverse direction for crossover between the platforms. At the top of the platforms exit stairs there are two rows of manual one-way swing gates.
