= Juan Parrochia =

Chilean architect (1930–2016)

- Born: Traiguén
- Died: February 8, 2016 (aged 85); Santiago

Juan Antonio Parrochia Beguin (Traiguén, April 1, 1930 - Santiago, February 8, 2016) was a Chilean architect and urban planner. He won the National Urbanism Prize of Chile in 1996 and, as the first director of the Santiago Metro, has been recognized as the designer of its master plan.

== Education and career ==
He studied architecture at the Faculty of Architecture of the University of Chile and graduated in 1952. The following year, he moved to Belgium to study Urban Planning. Between 1953 and 1954, he participated in programs of the Ministry of Reconstruction and Urbanism of France for Large Housing Complexes. He then studied urban planning at the University of Saint-Luc in Belgium, graduating as an urban planner in 1955.

Back in Chile in 1957, he was hired by the Ministry of Public Works and simultaneously worked as a professor at the Faculty of Architecture and Urbanism of the University of Chile.

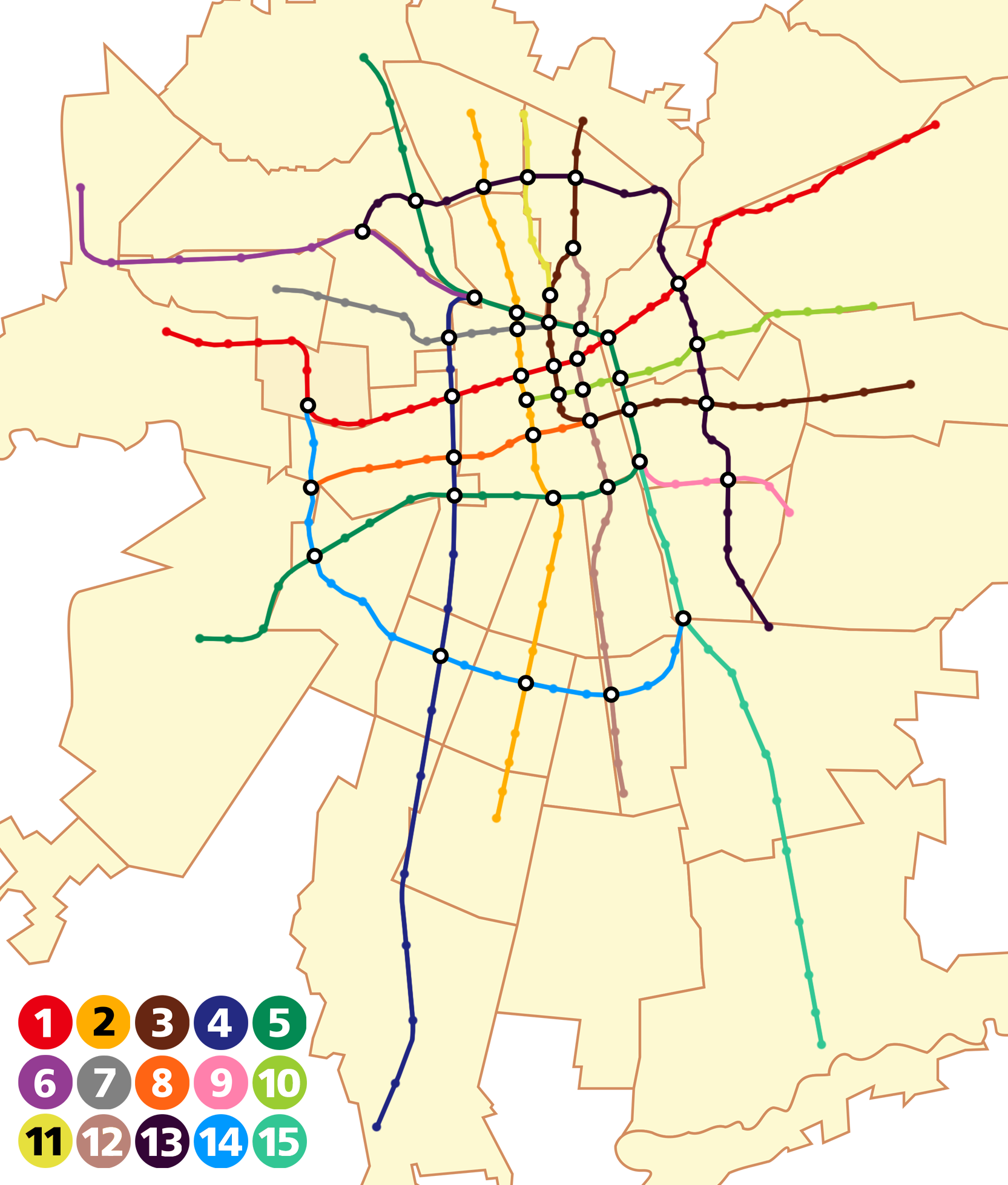
1969-2040 Santiago Metro master plan designed by Juan Parrochia

In 1960, he was appointed as Chief Architect of the Intercommunal Plan of Santiago. Four years later, then President Eduardo Frei Montalva tasked him with finding a solution to the recurring transportation problem in Santiago as Director of Planning and Urbanism at the Ministry of Public Works. During the government of Salvador Allende, he was named the first Director of National Urban Highways in 1971 until the 1973 coup d'état led by General Augusto Pinochet.

On September 17 of that year, Parrochia was appointed by the military dictatorship as the first Director General of Metro to continue the construction of the Santiago Metro, which he had designed and supervised. In July 1975, the technical inauguration of Line 1 took place, and on September 15, the section between San Pablo and La Moneda stations was officially opened. Two months later, Parrochia resigned to focus on academia.

From his several positions at the Ministry of Public Works, he participated alongside other professionals in projects such as elevated roads in Valparaíso, access to the port of Talcahuano, coastal roads along the Biobío River, and in Santiago, projects like the Circunvalación Américo Vespucio, the Mapocho river coastal road system, the North-South Avenue (a section of the Pan-American Highway), and the Kennedy Avenue, among others.

In 1996 he was awarded with the National Urbanism Prize of Chile.

Parrochia died in Santiago on February 8, 2016.
