= Alameda (Santiago) =

Avenue in Santiago, Chile

Coordinates: 33°26′55″S 70°40′14″W

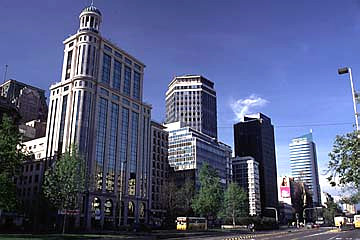
Avenida Libertador General Bernardo O'Higgins

Avenida Libertador General Bernardo O'Higgins (English: General Liberator Bernardo O'Higgins Avenue), popularly known as 'La Alameda' (meaning, a street bordered by poplar trees), is the main avenue of Santiago, Chile. It runs east–west in the centre of the greater urban area and is 7.77 km (4.83 mi) long, and it has up to 5 lanes in each direction. It was named after Chile's founding father Bernardo O'Higgins. It was originally a branch of the Mapocho River.

== History ==
The avenue is located on the former stream bed of a branch of the Mapocho River, which was drying up between 1560 and 1580. Such landforms were known by the Spaniards as Cañadas, and from there the origin of its initial name of Cañada. For many decades it was used as a landfill site, until it was converted into a boulevard by Bernardo O'Higgins during the first years of independence of the country and was named as Alameda de las Delicias.

== Description ==
Alameda Avenue originates immediately west of the Plaza Baquedano, as a continuation of Providencia Avenue, and runs in a generally southwesterly direction until its junction with Chile Route 68. The south section of the initial stretch of the avenue is dominated by a cluster of tower blocks called Remodelación San Borja. On the opposite side of the Alameda, the city blocks are characterized by a continuous building frontage. This urban design is broken by the Centro Cultural Gabriela Mistral. The corner of the Alameda and Portugal Avenue is home to the headquarters of the Pontifical Catholic University of Chile.

Heading west, the avenue skirts the southern edge of the Cerro Santa Lucía. The following stretch of the Alameda consists of almost unbroken blocks of mostly office and commercial buildings interspersed with some historical buildings, including the Biblioteca Nacional de Chile, San Francisco Church, Club de la Unión and behind it the building housing the Santiago Stock Exchange, as well as the old building serving as headquarters for the University of Chile, which faces the Paseo Ahumada. West of the just mentioned street and a half block north of the Alameda is located the Edificio Ariztía.

West of San Francisco Church, the Alameda's median widens to accommodate a park. The avenue bisects a large rectangular area lined with walls of government buildings, whose core portion is home to the Palacio de la Moneda. West of Amunátegui Street stands the Torre Entel, a landmark communication tower. The Norte-Sur axis of the Autopista Central passes underneath Alameda. From here the average height of the buildings decreases significantly.

Between Brasil Avenue and Cumming Avenue, it borders the Barrio Concha y Toro. Leaving the central district at Matucana Avenue, the Alameda enters into Estación Central. The Santiago Estación Central railway station and the main campus of the University of Santiago are located here. Crossing Las Rejas Avenue, the avenue forms the boundary between Estación Central to the south and Lo Prado to the north. The Alameda terminates at a partial Y interchange.

== Monuments ==
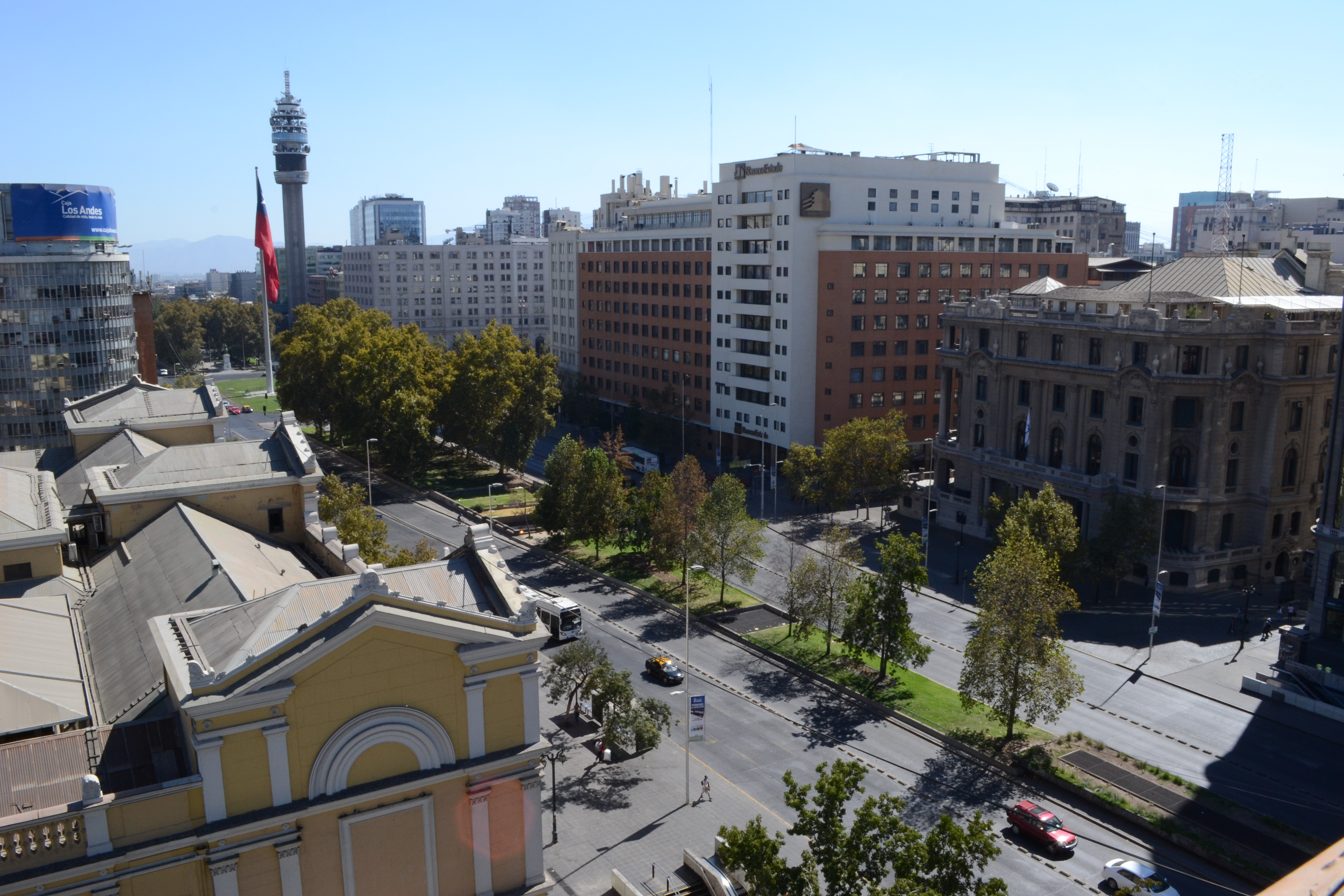
Downtown.

La Alameda's principal monuments are dedicated to the military heroes in Chile's history. Near the La Moneda Palace are the statues of José de San Martín, Manuel Bulnes Prieto, and Bernardo O'Higgins. In 1989, the Glory and Victory monument was inaugurated in honor of the Carabineros who died in the line of duty, near Plaza Baquedano.

Near the intersection of the Autopista Central and La Alameda, there is erected the statue to the heroes of the Battle of La Concepción. A beautiful mosaic was constructed at the edge of Santa Lucía Hill in honor of the poet Gabriela Mistral; there are also dozens of other monuments to persons of national and international importance along the central floe of La Alameda.

== Santiago Metro ==
Underneath the avenue runs Line 1 (depicted on subway maps as), the main line of the Santiago Metro. The transit agency's headquarters are located at the corner of La Alameda and Lord Cochrane street. From west to east, the stations along La Alameda are:

- Las Rejas
- Ecuador
- San Alberto Hurtado
- Universidad de Santiago
- Estación Central
- Unión Latinoamericana
- República
- Los Héroes
- La Moneda
- Universidad de Chile
- Santa Lucía
- Universidad Católica
- Baquedano
