= Santiago Metro =

Rapid transit system in Santiago, Chile

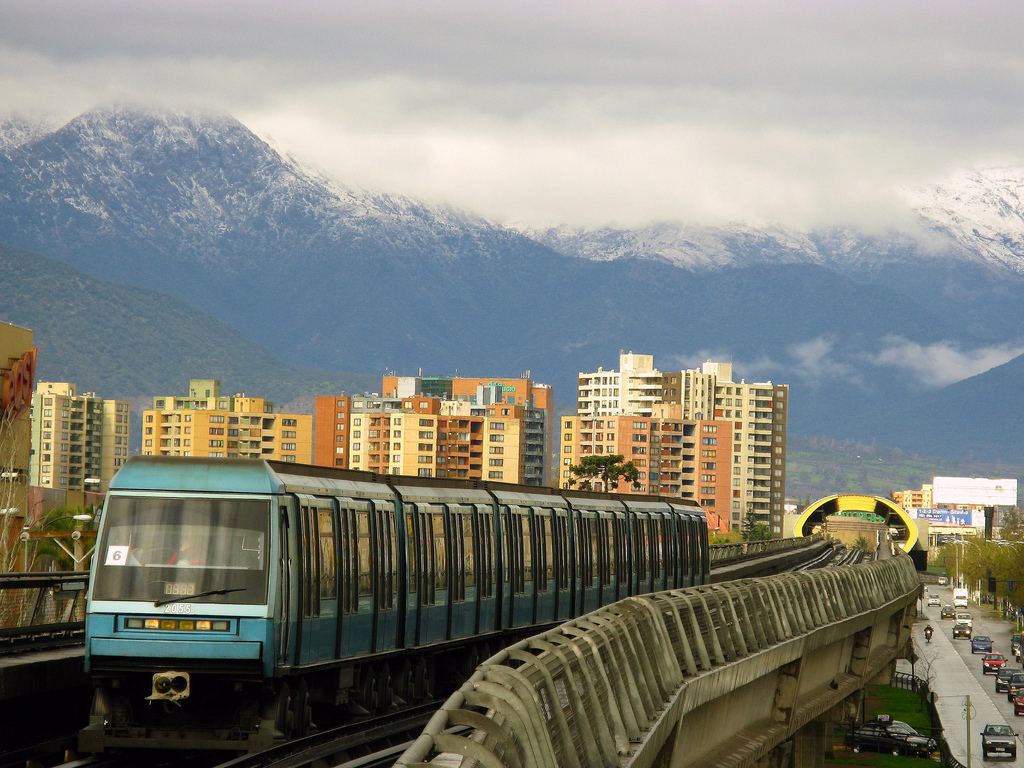
- NS 93 train on an elevated portion of the line 5 in 2008

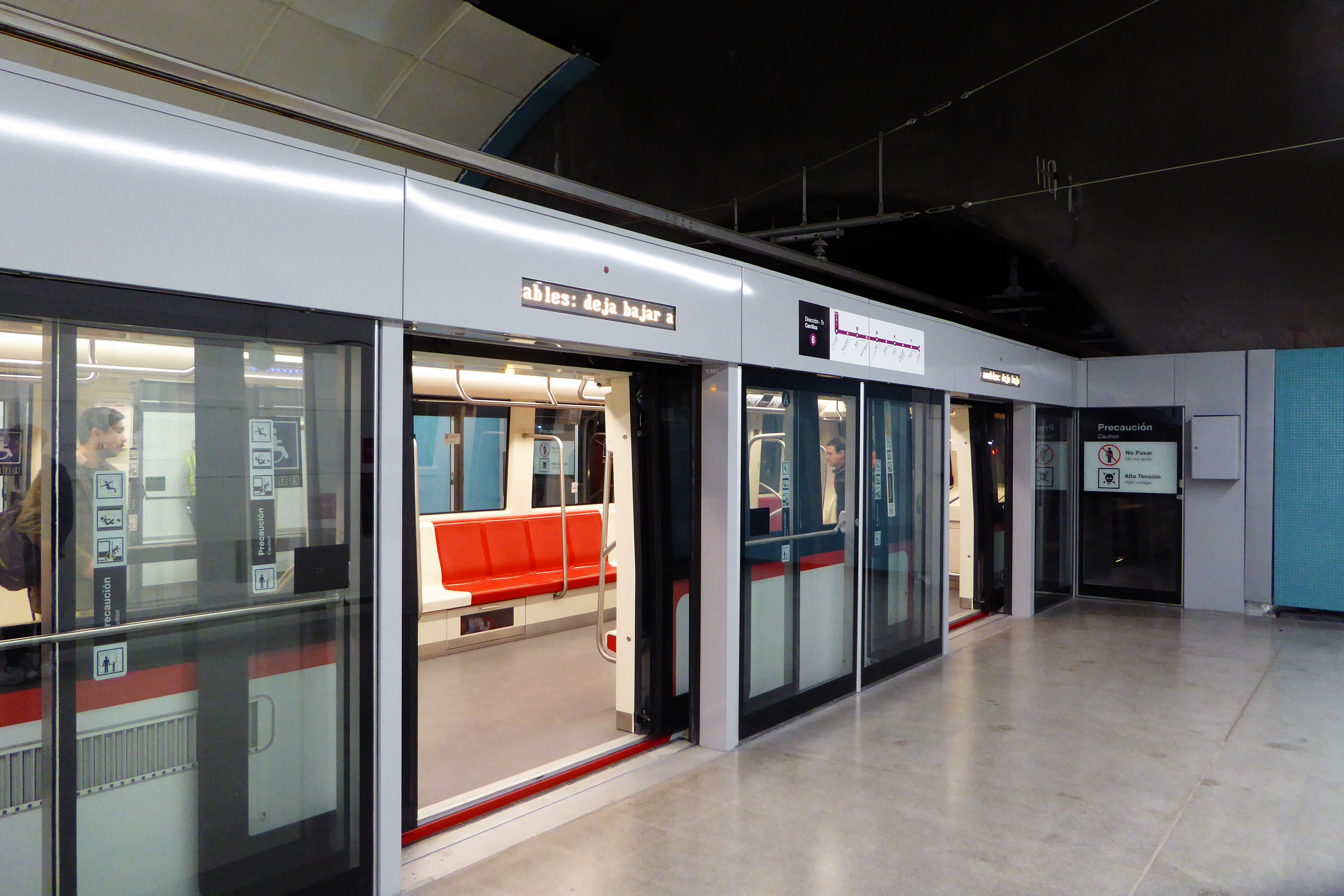
- AS-2014 train on the line 6 side of Los Leones

Overview
- Native name: Metro de Santiago
- Locale: Santiago, Chile
- Transit type: Rapid transit
- Number of lines: 7 (numbered) with 2 more under construction, 2 under planning)
- Number of stations: 143
- Daily ridership: 2.03 million (avg. weekday, 2023)
- Annual ridership: 599 million (2023)
- Website: Metro de Santiago

Operation
- Began operation: 15 September 1975; 51 years ago
- Operator: Metro S.A

Technical
- System length: 149 km (93 mi)
- Track gauge: 1,435 mm (4 ft 8 1/2 in) standard gauge
- Electrification: 750 V DC from third rail (as guide bars on lines 1, 2 and 5, conventional on line 4/4A); 1,500 V DC from overhead catenary (lines 3, 6 and 7)
System map
Current Metro map, including the Nos railway

The Santiago Metro (Spanish: Metro de Santiago) is a rapid transit system serving the city of Santiago, the capital of Chile. It currently consists of seven lines (numbered 1-6 and 4A), 143 stations, and 149 kilometres (92.6 mi) of revenue route. The system is managed by the state-owned Metro S.A. and is the first rapid transit system in the country.

The Metro is integrated to the greater Red Metropolitana de Movilidad (Metropolitan Movility Network) system, alongside RED's 400~ bus lines, and EFE's commuter rail service to Nos.

The Santiago Metro carries around 2.5 million passengers daily. This figure represents an increase of more than a million passengers per day compared to 2007, when the ambitious Transantiago project was launched, in which the metro plays an important role in the public transport system serving the city. Its highest passenger peak was reached on 2 May 2019, reaching 2,951,962 passengers.

In June 2017 the government announced plans for the construction of Line 7, connecting Renca in the northwest of Santiago with Vitacura in the northeast. The new line will add 26 kilometres (16 mi) and 19 new stations to the Metro network, running along the municipalities of Renca, Cerro Navia, Quinta Normal, Santiago, Providencia, Las Condes and Vitacura. Its cost has been initially estimated at US$2.53 bn, and it is projected to open in 2028.

Santiago Metro is the second largest metro system in Latin America after the Mexico City Metro, and the sixth largest rail system in the Americas by ridership.

In March 2012, the Santiago Metro was chosen as the best underground system in the Americas, after being honoured at the annual reception held by Metro Rail in London.

== History and development ==
=== Early projections and construction of Line 1 ===
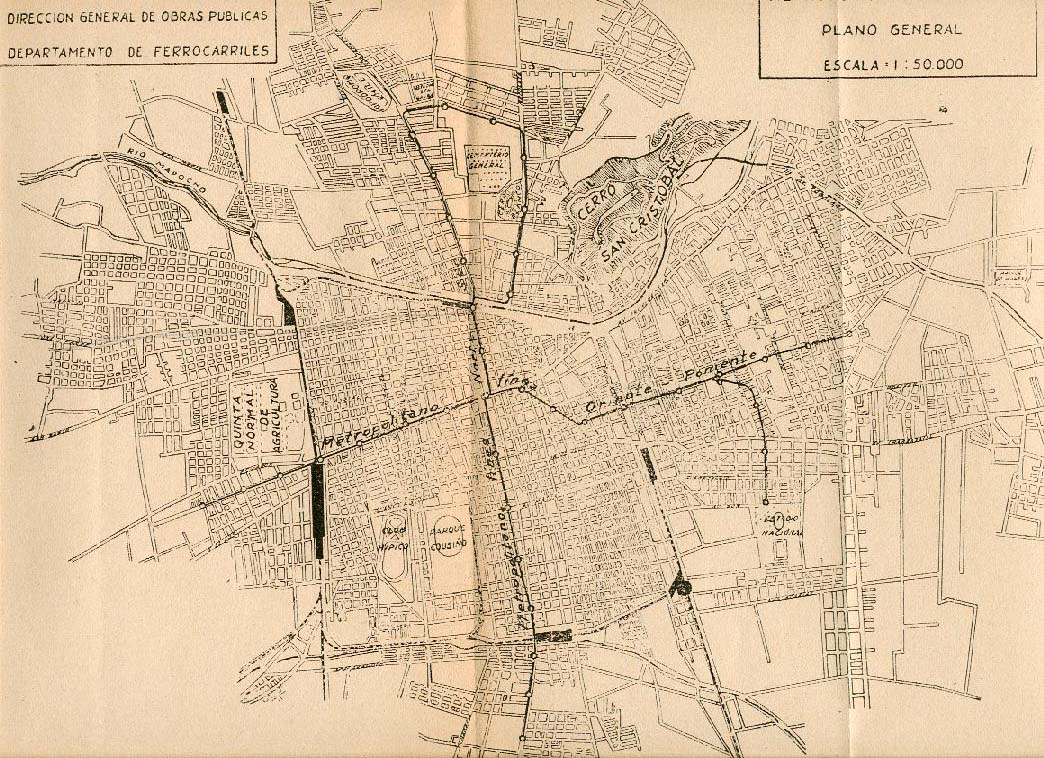
Metro network projection in 1944

The idea of constructing an underground railway network in Santiago dates back to 1944 when efforts to improve the chaotic transport system were initiated due to the rapid population growth the city had been experiencing since the early 1930s.

However, concrete plans began to materialize in the 1960s when Juan Parrochia was appointed as Chief Architect of the Intercommunal Plan of Santiago and began working on an urban master plan featuring a Metro network.

Consequently, the government issued an international tender for the development of an urban transport system. On 24 October 1968, the government of Eduardo Frei Montalva approved the draft submitted by the Franco-Chilean consortium BCEOM SOFRETU CADE, in which the construction of five lines with an extension of approximately 60 kilometres (37 mi) by 1990 was proposed.

On 29 May 1969, works finally began for the construction of the first line, which would link the Civil District and the area of Barrancas (current-day Lo Prado).

On 15 September 1975, the first line of the metro was opened by Augusto Pinochet during the military dictatorship. Line 1, during its opening stage, was mostly underground from San Pablo to La Moneda, running below the Alameda. In 1977, the line was extended towards Providencia and by 1980, the line reached as far as Escuela Militar in Las Condes.

In March 1978, Line 2 was opened. Its initial section ran at ground level from Los Héroes to Franklin. By December, the second segment of the line was opened, running underground towards the south along the Gran Avenida up to Lo Ovalle.

=== Project changes ===
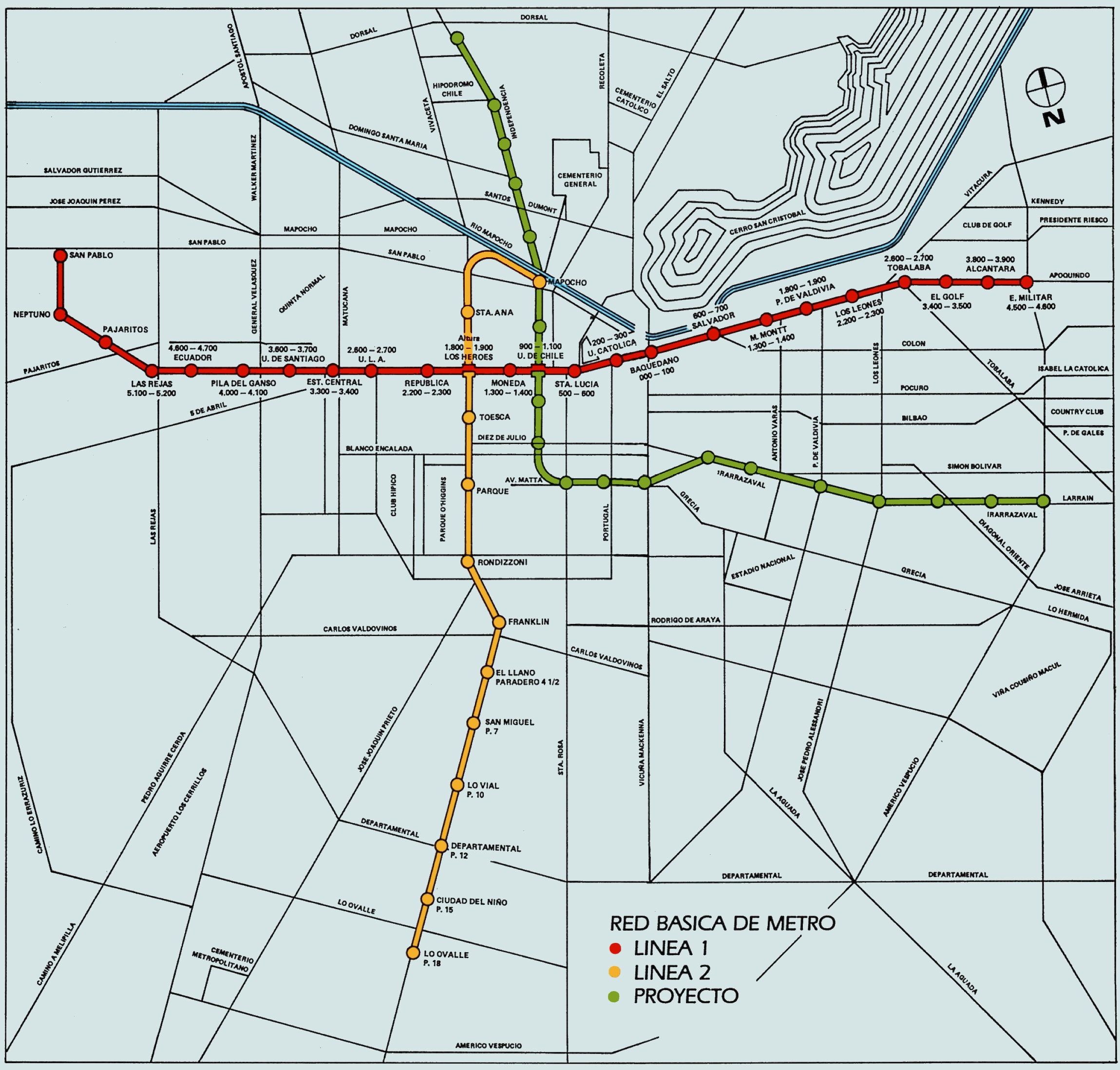
Projected metro network for 1987 according to the original plans

Despite the fast growth of the network, the severe economic crisis that affected the country in 1982 halted the original plans. Furthermore, studies showed that southeast Santiago was becoming more populated than the north end of the capital, area that was then covered by the planned extensions of the service.

In order to supply future demand, the layout for Line 2 was changed and the extension would start at Los Héroes and go around the Civic District, crossing Line 1 again at Baquedano to head south through Vicuña Mackenna. Meanwhile, Line 3 was projected through Independencia and Irarrázaval to supply the northern area that Line 2 was supposed to run.

However, these plans were affected once again when an earthquake struck the Chilean Central Valley on 3 March 1985. Most of the funds destined for the construction of the Line 2 extension and Line 3 were used to rebuild the city. The opening of two new stations towards the north in 1986 (Santa Ana) and 1987 (Puente Cal y Canto) were the only finalised works from these plans: Santa Ana and Mapocho stations on Line 2. The latter would change its name later, as remains of the old Calicanto Bridge –emblem of the city for over a century– were discovered during the excavation process. That same year, the Metrobús service was launched with services operating from Escuela Militar, Lo Ovalle and Las Rejas.

Institutionally, the management of Metro de Santiago was changed at the end of the decade. The former General Directorate of Metro, a branch of the Ministry of Public Works, became a state-funded public company, Metro S.A., with the provisions of Law 18,772 published on 28 January 1989.

Following the economic recovery after the second miracle, the metro's expansion plans resurged. Population growth in the southeastern area of the capital became unstoppable during the 1980s, and La Florida became the most populous commune in the country, thus the construction of a new line to supply that area was paramount. The first plans were drawn in 1989 and it was officially announced in 1991 by President Patricio Aylwin. This new line would start from Baquedano and head southwards to Américo Vespucio Avenue, crossing through Vicuña Mackenna.

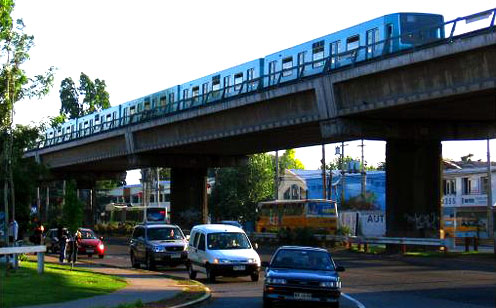
NS-74 train on Line 5, opened in 1997

Line 5 was opened on 5 April 1997 by President Eduardo Frei Ruiz-Tagle. This new line would have a length of 10.3 kilometres (6.4 mi) initially running underground from Baquedano to Irarrázaval, emerging as a viaduct on Vicuña Mackenna and going underground before reaching its southeastern terminus, Bellavista de la Florida.

In March 2000, a new section of Line 5 crossing the historic centre of the capital was opened to the public. The new connection between Baquedano and Santa Ana through Plaza de Armas and Bellas Artes meant that all three at-the-time existing lines would be connected.

=== New lines 4 and 4A and line 2 extension ===
With the election of Ricardo Lagos as President of Chile in 2000, one of his main objectives was an overhaul of the transport system serving the capital. To achieve this, a new extension for Line 5 was designed, heading westwards to Quinta Normal, following Catedral street, and an extension for Line 2 from both ends of the line to reach the northern and southern ends of the Américo Vespucio ring road.

Despite this, the biggest announcement was made in 2002 when Lagos disclosed the construction of a fourth line for the metro, serving the southeastern communes of Santiago to reach the heart of Puente Alto, which had taken over La Florida as the most populous commune of the country. With these new projects, the Metro network would double its extension by 2010, year in which the country would celebrate its bicentennial.

These new projects were designed to make Metro the key element of the new transport reform plan for the city, Transantiago. Along with the new extensions, exchange stations were designed to allow for a better interaction between the urban railways and other means of transport, mainly buses. The first exchange station would open in Quinta Normal after the Line 5 extension was finalised on 31 March 2004. However, the original plan to host a railway station would be discarded following the failure of the Melitrén construction.

On September 8, 2004, the Metro would make another breakthrough when the Mapocho river was crossed underground, with the opening of Patronato and Cerro Blanco stations on Line 2. On 22 December 2004, the southern extension of the same line opened its new stations, El Parrón and La Cisterna. A second stretch of Line 2 towards the north would open on 25 November 2005, and the last in the series of extensions opened on 22 December 2005, with a total cost of US$170 million and a 27-million passenger increase annually.

On November 30, 2005, the first underground leg of Line 4 from Tobalaba to Grecia, and the viaduct between Vicente Valdés and Plaza de Puente Alto opened to the public. The unfinished track from Grecia and Vicente Valdés was covered by a rail replacement bus service operated by Transantiago until March 2, 2006, when the remaining stations and track were finished. Line 4 at this time was the longest of the network, with an extension of 24.7 kilometres (15.3 mi) and 22 stations serving Providencia, Las Condes, Ñuñoa, La Reina, Peñalolén, Macul, La Florida and Puente Alto. This new line also saw the introduction of new rolling stock, the AS-2002, manufactured by Alstom in Brazil, featuring more interior space than those running other lines. Finally, Line 4 would be complemented with the opening of a branch service on August 16, 2006, Line 4A, which connected Line 2 from La Cisterna with Line 4 at Vicuña Mackenna, running through the Américo Vespucio ring road.

=== Extensions to Las Condes and Maipú ===
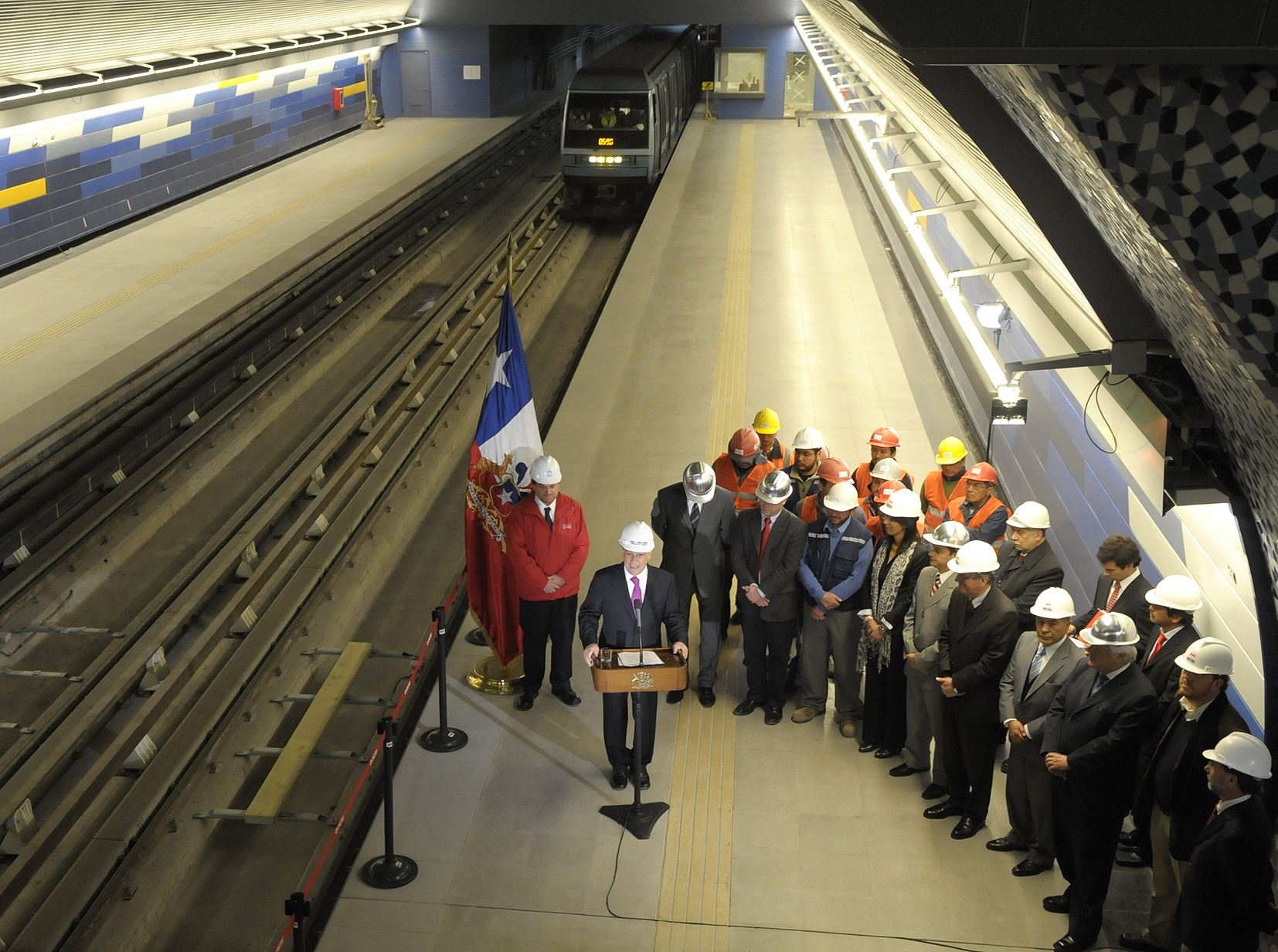
Inauguration of Line 5 extension to Maipú in 2010

On November 15, 2005, President Ricardo Lagos announced the extension of Line 1 to the east, from Escuela Militar to Los Dominicos station, in the commune of Las Condes. To achieve this, three new stations were built, adding 4 kilometers to the railway network, which were inaugurated on January 7, 2010, during the presidency of Michelle Bachelet.

Along with the extension to Las Condes, one of the most important projects of the service was announced: the extension of the metro to the west, connecting the communes of Maipú, Pudahuel, Lo Prado and Quinta Normal to the Metro Network. In this way, the Metro approached the western sector of the city for the first time, reaching Maipú, the most populated commune in the country after surpassing Puente Alto in 2008.

On October 31, 2009, the final layout of the extension of Line 5 was approved, starting from the Quinta Normal station along Avenida San Pablo underground, turning south to come to the surface and travel along Avenida Teniente Cruz and later Avenida Pajaritos before becoming underground again and reaching the terminal station, in the Plaza de Armas of Maipú. The first section to the Pudahuel station was delivered on January 12, 2010, while the remaining section Until Maipú was opened to the public on February 3, 2011.

Along with the construction of the new extensions, important works were carried out that allowed the Pajaritos station on Line 1 to be renovated to convert it into the terminal of a loop, allowing greater efficiency to the most loaded section of said line and the postponed San José de la Estrella station was inaugurated on Line 4. The Del Sol station was also built in the extension to Maipú, which serves as a transfer to intercity buses.

In March 2012, the Santiago Metro was chosen as the best metro system in America, a distinction received at the annual Metro Rail dinner held in London, United Kingdom.

=== Line 2 and 3 extensions ===
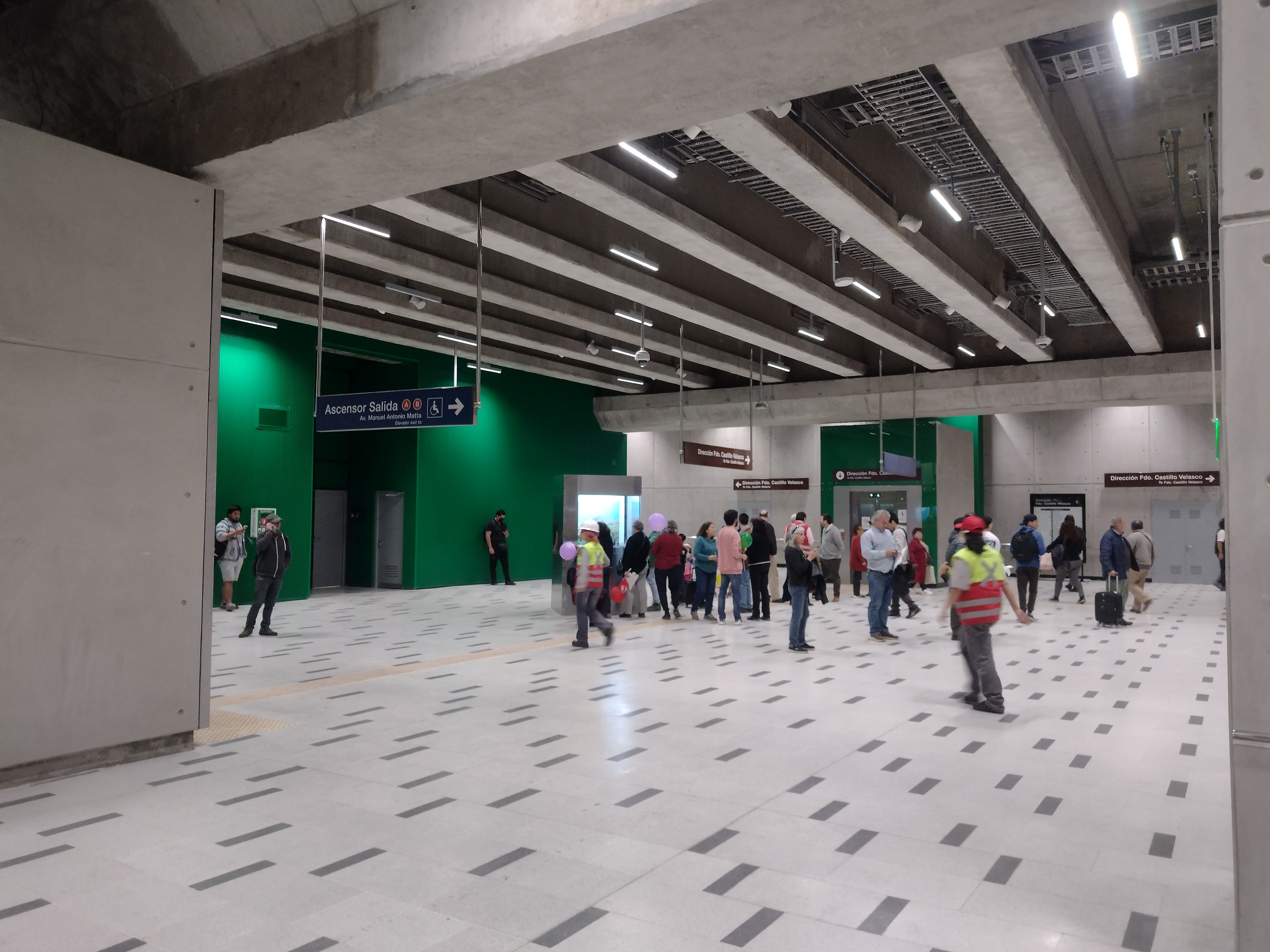
Plaza Quilicura station mezzanine level in 2023

On May 26, 2016, Metro announced the extension of Lines 2 and 3, adding 8.9 kilometers and 7 new stations to the Metro network. Both extensions were expected to begin operations during the second half of 2021. The extension of Line 2 to the south would add 5.1 kilometers and 4 new stations connecting the current terminal station in La Cisterna with San Bernardo locality. The new terminal station would be located next to a hospital called Hospital El Pino in San Bernardo. Meanwhile, the extension of Line 3 to the west would add 3.8 kilometers and 3 new stations to the Metro network, connecting the then-future station Los Libertadores with Quilicura.

On November 2, 2017, Line 6 was inaugurated from Cerrillos to Los Leones adding 10 new stations. This new line does not have staffed ticket offices; instead there are automatic machines for ticket sales and loading money onto bip! cards. It has platform-edge doors to protect passengers, and traction power is supplied by overhead line equipment, not by conductor rails as on the other lines. It has new entrance and exit turnstiles at stations. The trains on Line 6 only have steel wheels, and are driverless.

On January 22, 2019, Line 3 was inaugurated, after 9 years of prospecting and construction and being delayed since the 1980s after the 1985 Algarrobo earthquake and the changing demographics of the city during the 1980s and 1990s. Its rolling stock is identical to that on Line 6, and the lines were built simultaneously, so they are considered "twin lines".

On September 25, 2023, Line 3 was extended 3.8 km west from its northern terminus to Plaza Quilicura. On November 27, 2023, Line 2 was extended 5.2 km south from its southern terminus to Hospital El Pino.

=== 2019 protests ===
In October 2019, the Santiago metro network was affected by social protests due to the increase in the fare of the entire Metropolitan Mobility Network. Initially, secondary students staged massive acts of evasion between 6 and 11 October. The protests quickly escalated to several metro stations, resulting in train service being repeatedly interrupted.

On 18 October, the situation escalated and the entire network had to be closed due to attacks on stations and workers. At night, after the declaration of a state of emergency by President Sebastián Piñera, several stations of the Metro were destroyed and burned, some of which were attacked again the next day, even though a curfew had been established. Meanwhile, the Instituto Nacional de Derechos Humanos investigated accusations that the Baquedano station was used as a detention and torture center by police and military. On the morning of the same day, the site was reviewed by staff from the INDH, PDI and guarantee judges. The judges found no evidence of torture or illegal detentions at the site, but an investigation was launched to rule out any irregular situation. However, investigations conducted by the National Institute of Human Rights and the Public Prosecutor's Office found no evidence in this regard; in 2020, the allegations were dismissed, and the case was closed.

The Metro network was partially reactivated as of Monday, October 21; however, due to the damage of some stations, the network would only be available in its entirety within a period of up to 7 months. Damages were estimated at more than $300 million. Metro de Santiago indicated that station infrastructure and rolling stock had not been insured. Lines 3 and 6, meanwhile, opened on 23 October, Lines 2 and 5 on the 25th, Line 4 on the 28th, and line 4A on November 25, in all cases partially and on a shortened schedule.

On October 23, it was reported that 79 stations had been damaged in all, with lines 4, 4A, and 5 having the highest number of stations destroyed or vandalized. There were also damage to 6 trains, 5 on line 4 and one on line 1 - the latter set on fire at the San Pablo station. Upon the reopening of the last two stations (Trinidad and Protectora de la Infancia) on September 25, 2020, the metro system was back to 100% operation.

=== Lines 7, 8, 9 and Line A ===
Projected lines and extensions for year 2037: It includes the extension of lines 4A and 6, the construction of four new lines 7, 8, 9 and A, and the construction of the Santiago-Batuco commuter rail and the extension of the Melitrén commuter rail.

On June 1, 2017, President Michelle Bachelet announced in her last public account the construction of Metro Line 7. The plan initially included 21 stations along a 25 km extension, between the commune of Renca in the northwestern sector, and Vitacura in the northeastern sector. The route, estimated to open around 2027, was designed with a line parallel to the Mapocho River and Line 1 in mind, which would allow it to be decongested by approximately 10 000 daily passengers. Line 7 would allow the incorporation of the communes of Renca, Cerro Navia and Vitacura into the Network, also connecting popular neighborhoods with part of the financial and commercial district of the city.

At the end of 2017, the newspaper El Mercurio published a report that indicated that the route of the line was modified, so that in the Providencia sector it would not circulate under Andrés Bello Avenue (as originally thought), but would go parallel to Line 1 along Providencia Avenue, eliminating the combination in Salvador and moving it to Pedro de Valdivia. In addition, Metro announced that it would extend Line 6 to Isidora Goyenechea of the future Line 7.

One year after the announcement of Line 7, President Sebastián Piñera announced in his 2018 annual account that studies would begin for the construction of two new metro lines in a north–south direction: Line 8, which will connect the communes of La Florida and Puente Alto with Providencia, while Line 9 would reach from the center to the commune of La Pintana, one of the last in the city to receive the Metro. In addition, he announced that Line 4 would be extended by three stations in the southern sector to reach Bajos de Mena in Puente Alto. It was projected at that time that lines 8 and 9 would be inaugurated in 2028.

The impact of the social outbreak of 2019 delayed the planning work for the extension of the three lines, being resumed in September 2021, so it is estimated that lines 7, 8 and 9 would be inaugurated from 2030. In August 2023, a modification to the layout of Line 9 was announced, expanding it in the north to the Puente Cal y Canto station — which will become the first station with four concurrent lines — and in the south to Plaza de Puente Alto, combining with Line 4 and absorbing the proposed extension to Bajos de Mena.

On May 14, 2025, the newspaper Diario Financiero reported that President Gabriel Boric would announce during that year's public address the construction of a light rail project that would connect the future Line 7 with the Arturo Merino Benítez International Airport. With an estimated length of between six and seven kilometers, the train would connect the airport with the future station located on Avenida Mapocho Sur with Huelén in Cerro Navia.

Finally, before the National Congress of Chile, President Gabriel Boric announced on June 1, 2025, the construction of Line A, a light rail line connecting the country's main airport and the Huelén station on Line 7.

=== Extension of Line 6 and 4A ===
Before the full Congress, President Gabriel Boric announced on June 1, 2025, that once funds are available, the extension of Line 6 will be built to the populous western part of Maipú, near the Hospital El Carmen. The extension will consist of 6.4 km and three new stations. Similarly, Line 4A will be extended from La Cisterna to Maipú to Del Sol station, connecting the Lo Espejo district to the metro network, one of the poorest and most isolated in the metropolitan area. The line will also undergo a modernization process and be renamed Line 10. The extension will consist of 10 km and seven new stations. Both projects are expected to be completed no earlier than 2037.

=== Future plans ===
Various proposals have been presented to expand the Santiago Metro once lines 7, 8 and 9 are built.

Two communes in Greater Santiago wont have built or planned connections to the Metro Network: Padre Hurtado and Lo Barnechea, while other three only have in their limits: San Bernardo, Peñalolén and Huechuraba. The municipality of Lo Barnechea has expressed its interest in building two additional stations on Line 7 to reach La Dehesa.

During the inauguration of Line 3 in 2019, President Sebastián Piñera declared that Line 10 was going to be built. Although Metro indicated that a tenth line was not officially in its project portfolio, the government indicated that the initiative attempted to connect the Avenida Mapocho sector with Avenida Tobalaba, following the so-called "central ring" along Las Rejas, Suiza and Departamental avenues.

Other alternatives for new lines have been analyzed in the media in recent years and have been momentarily discarded; a line in the eastern sector through Tobalaba-Vespucio or Manquehue, another parallel to Line 1 through 5 de Abril-Blanco Encalada-Santa Isabel-Bilbao and Manquehue, and the northern section of "Line 10" through Dorsal, Lo Espinoza and Radal.

=== Timeline ===
Line		Length	Stations	Opening Date	Type
Santiago Metro Line 1	San Pablo – La Moneda	8.2 km	12	15 Sep 1975	Trench/Underground
Santiago Metro Line 1	La Moneda – Salvador	3.2 km	5	31 Mar 1977	Underground
Santiago Metro Line 2	Los Héroes – Franklin	4.9 km	5	31 Mar 1978	Ground Level
Santiago Metro Line 2	Franklin – Lo Ovalle	4.8 km	6	21 Dec 1978	Underground
Santiago Metro Line 1	Salvador – Escuela Militar	4.5 km	7	22 Aug 1980	Underground
Santiago Metro Line 2	Los Héroes – Santa Ana	0.7 km	1	25 Jul 1986	Ground level
Santiago Metro Line 2	Santa Ana – Puente Cal y Canto	1 km	1	15 Sep 1987	Ground/Underground
Santiago Metro Line 5	Baquedano – Bellavista de La Florida	10.3 km	12	5 Apr 1997	Viaduct/Underground
Santiago Metro Line 5	Baquedano – Santa Ana	2.7 km	3	4 Mar 2000	Underground
Santiago Metro Line 5	Santa Ana – Quinta Normal	1.9 km	2	31 Mar 2004	Underground
Santiago Metro Line 2	Puente Cal y Canto – Cerro Blanco	1.6 km	2	8 Sept 2004	Underground
Santiago Metro Line 2	Lo Ovalle – La Cisterna	2.1 km	2	22 Dec 2004	Underground
Santiago Metro Line 2	Cerro Blanco – Einstein	1.9 km	2	25 Nov 2005	Underground
Santiago Metro Line 5	Bellavista de La Florida – Vicente Valdés	0.6 km	1	30 Nov 2005	Underground
Santiago Metro Line 4	Vicente Valdés – Plaza de Puente Alto	10.9 km	9	30 Nov 2005	Viaduct/Underground
Santiago Metro Line 4	Tobalaba – Grecia	7.7 km	8	30 Nov 2005	Underground
Santiago Metro Line 4	Grecia – Vicente Valdés	6.1 km	5	2 Mar 2006	Ground level
Santiago Metro Line 4A	Vicuña Mackenna – La Cisterna	7.7 km	6	16 Aug 2006	Ground level
Santiago Metro Line 2	Einstein – Vespucio Norte	3.6 km	3	21 Dec 2006	Underground
Santiago Metro Line 4	San José de la Estrella	0 km	1	5 Nov 2009	Viaduct
Santiago Metro Line 1	Escuela Militar – Los Dominicos	4 km	3	7 Jan 2010	Underground
Santiago Metro Line 5	Quinta Normal – Pudahuel	5.8 km	5	12 Jan 2010	Underground
Santiago Metro Line 5	Pudahuel – Plaza de Maipú	8 km	7	3 Feb 2011	Viaduct
Santiago Metro Line 6	Cerrillos – Los Leones	15.3 km	10	2 Nov 2017	Underground
Santiago Metro Line 3	Los Libertadores – Fernando Castillo Velasco	21.7 km	18	22 Jan 2019	Underground
Santiago Metro Line 3	Los Libertadores – Plaza Quilicura	3.8 km	3	25 Sept 2023	Underground
Santiago Metro Line 2	La Cisterna – Hospital El Pino	5.2 km	4	27 Nov 2023	Underground
Santiago Metro Line 6	Cerrillos – Lo Errázuriz	3 km	1	2028	Underground
Santiago Metro Line 6	Los Leones – Isidora Goyenechea	1.4 km	1	2028	Underground
Santiago Metro Line 7	Brasil – Estoril	24.8 km	19	2028	Underground
Santiago Metro Line 9	Bío Bío – Plaza de La Pintana	12.2 km	10	2030	Underground
	Aeropuerto - Huelén	6.5 km	2	2032	Underground
Santiago Metro Line 8	Chile España – Mall Plaza Tobalaba	14.7 km	11	2032	Underground
Santiago Metro Line 9	Puente Cal y Canto – Bío Bío	5.4 km	4	2032	Underground
Santiago Metro Line 9	Plaza de La Pintana – Plaza de Puente Alto	9.8 km	5	2033	Underground
Santiago Metro Line 8	Los Leones – Chile España	4.3 km	3	2033	Underground
Santiago Metro Line 6	Hospital El Carmen – Lo Errázuriz	6.4 km	3	2037	Underground
Santiago Metro Line 4A	Del Sol – La Cisterna	10 km	7	2037	Underground

== Rolling stock ==
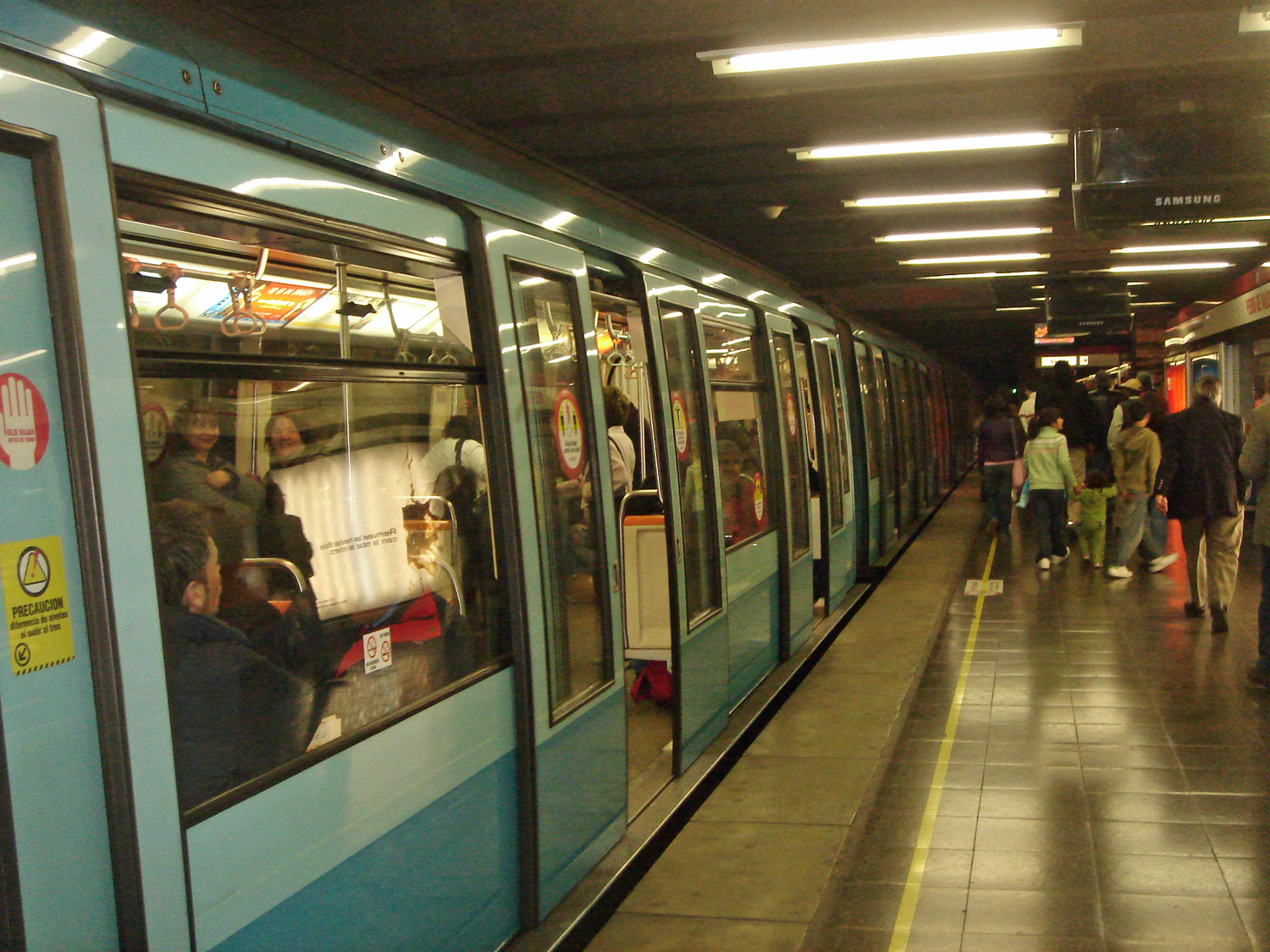
The NS 93 rubber-tyred stock, based on the MP 89 from the Paris Metro

The Santiago Metro currently operates 9 models of rolling stock: two models (the AS-2002 and the AS-2014) are steel-wheeled, while the others are all rubber-tyred. The NS 74 and NS 93 stock are based on the MP 73 and MP 89 stock of the Paris Metro respectively, while the NS-2007 stock is based on the NM-02 stock of the Mexico City Metro. All rubber-tyred stock is preceded with the acronym NS (for Neumático Santiago) (Note: English: Santiago Tire); likewise, all steel-wheeled stock is preceded with the acronym AS (for Acero Santiago) (Note: English: Santiago Steel). The number representing each type of rubber-tyred and steel-wheeled rolling stock is the year of design of a particular rolling stock, not year of first use, similar to the practice in the Mexico City Metro and Paris Métro.

In September 2012, the NS 2012 trains went into service on Line 1. These trains are the first to be built with air conditioning. Currently, all the NS-2007 stock and a number of the NS-93 stock units are retrofitted with air conditioning, whereas the NS-2012, AS-2014 and NS-2016 were all built with air conditioning.

On November 2, 2017, the line 6 entered revenue service. This line utilizes the AS-2014 (Acero Santiago 2014) which are the most modern stock of the system, being the first model in the system that are driverless. However, in the first and last car there is a control panel meant to control the train when necessary. It is also the first with security cameras, energy obtainment via overhead rigid catenary, and evacuation doors at the front of the first and last car (with an evacuation ramp for people on wheelchairs) as well as on the sides of each convoy. They are also the second to be built with air conditioning, and the third with LED lights. The line that they operate in is also the first in revenue service with platform safety barriers, followed by Line 3 opened in January 2019.

Model	Manufacturer	Year(s) Built	Type of train	Operating Lines
NS-74	Alstom	1973–1981	Rubber-tyred	
NS 93	Alstom	1996–2003	Rubber-tyred	
AS-2002	Alstom	2004–2010	Steel-wheeled	
NS-2004	Alstom	2006–2007	Rubber-tyred	
NS-2007	CAF	2009–2010	Rubber-tyred	
NS-2012	CAF	2012–2014	Rubber-tyred	
AS-2014	CAF	2015–2017	Steel-wheeled	
NS-2016	Alstom	2017–2021	Rubber-tyred	
AS-22-UTO	Alstom	2026-present	Steel-wheeled	Santiago Metro Line 7

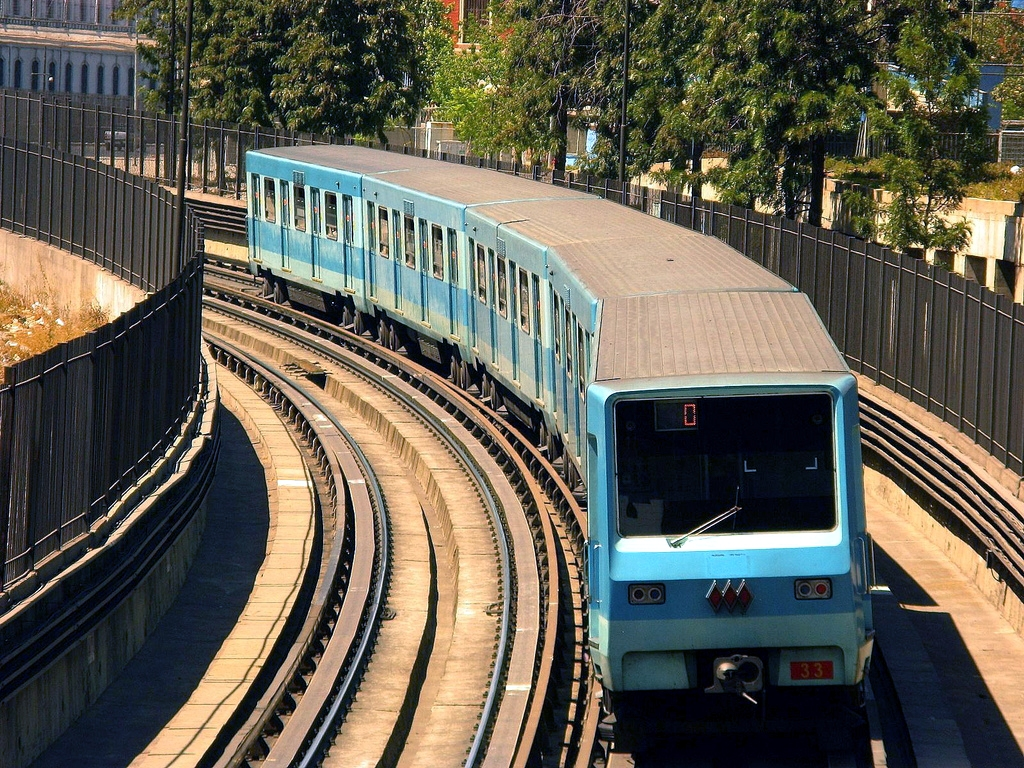
NS-74

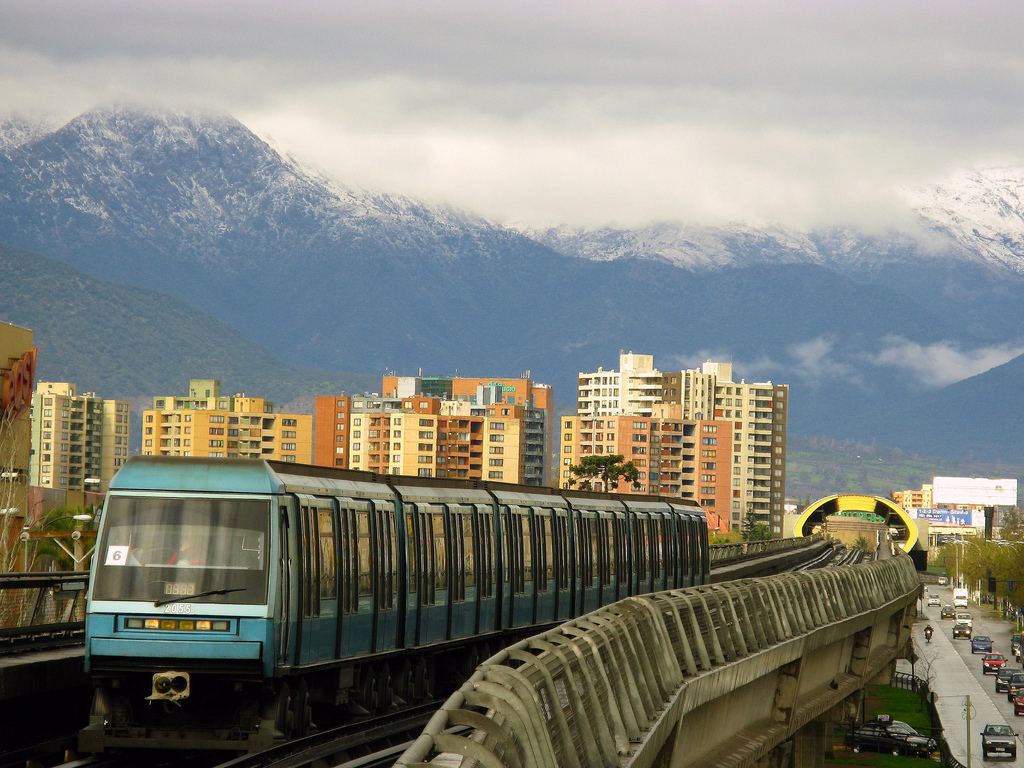
NS 93

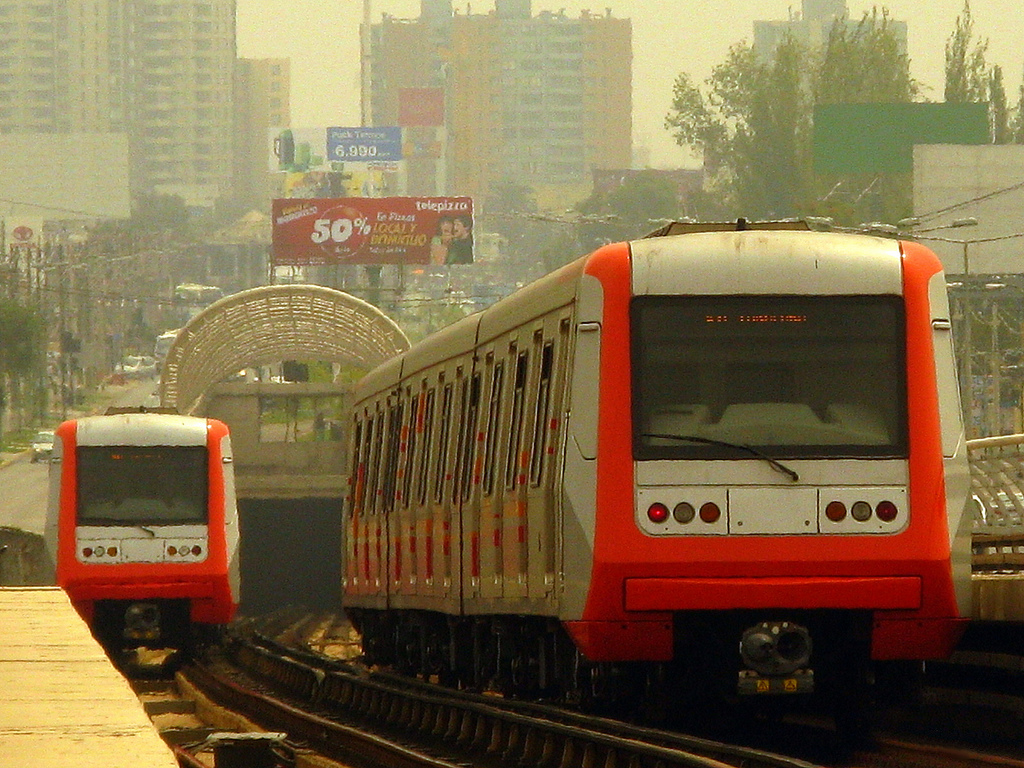
AS-2002

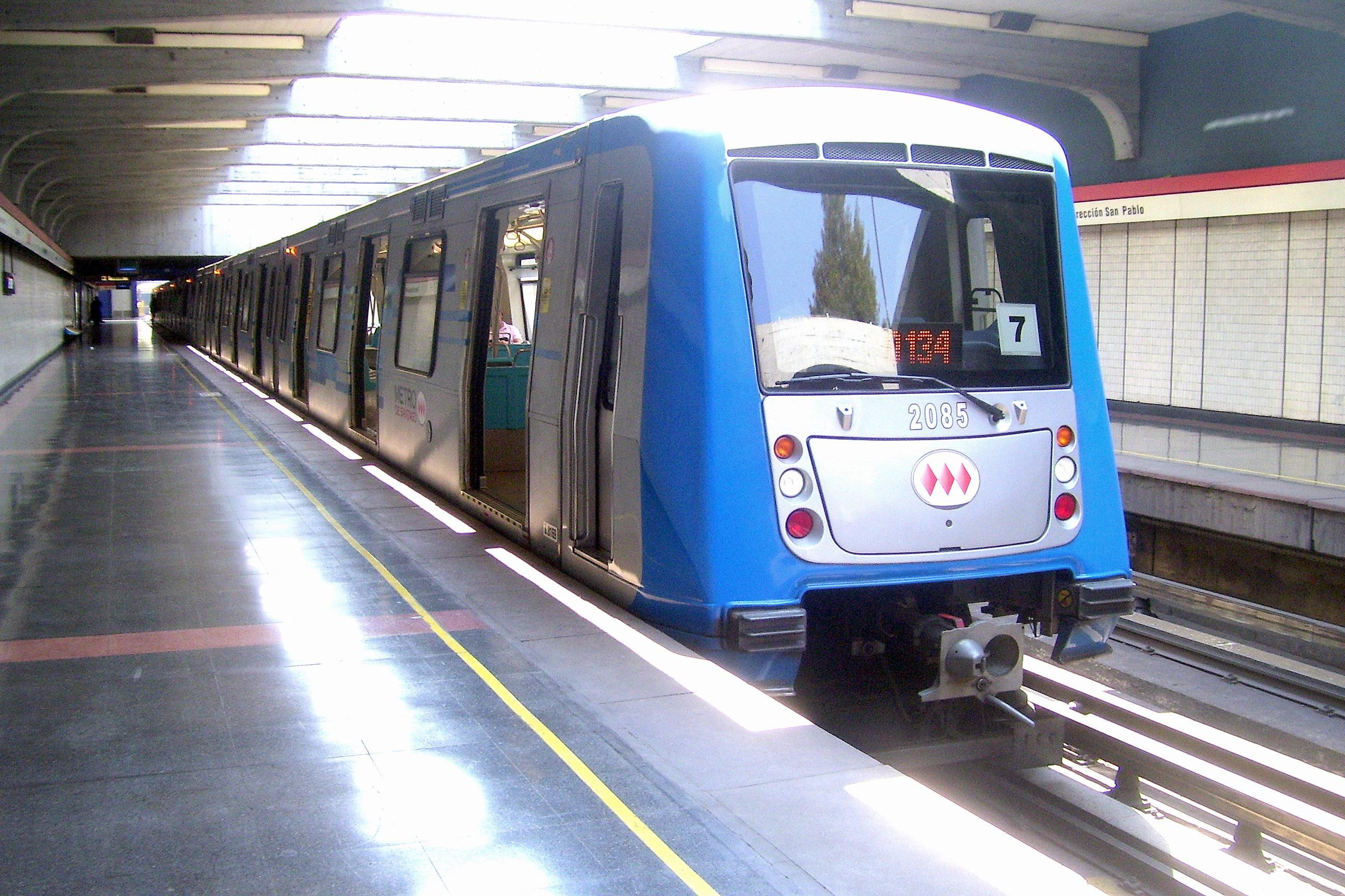
NS-2004

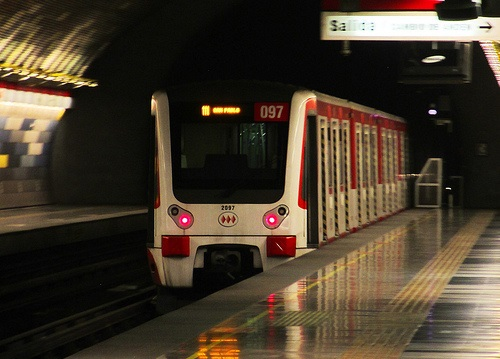
NS-2007

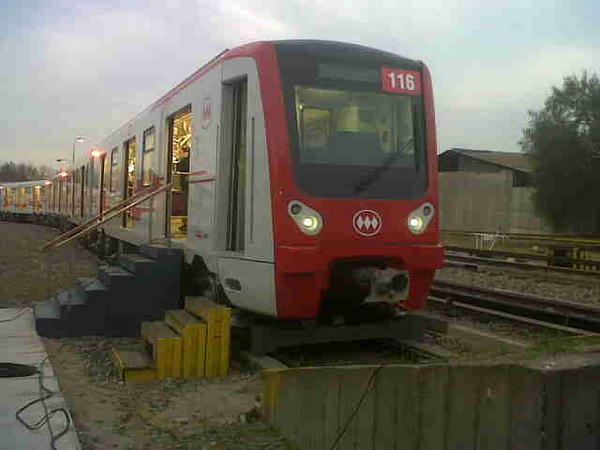
NS-2012

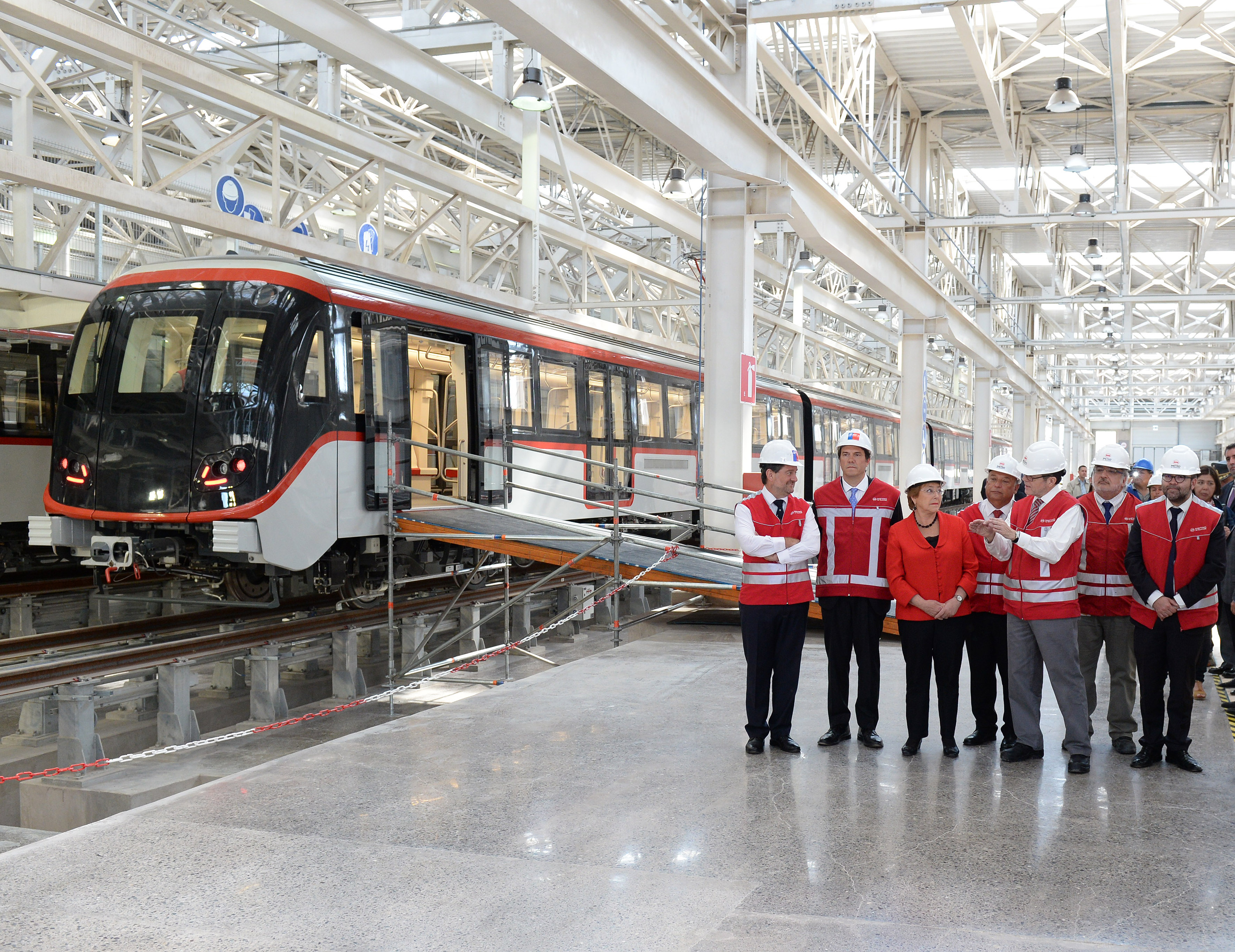
AS-2014

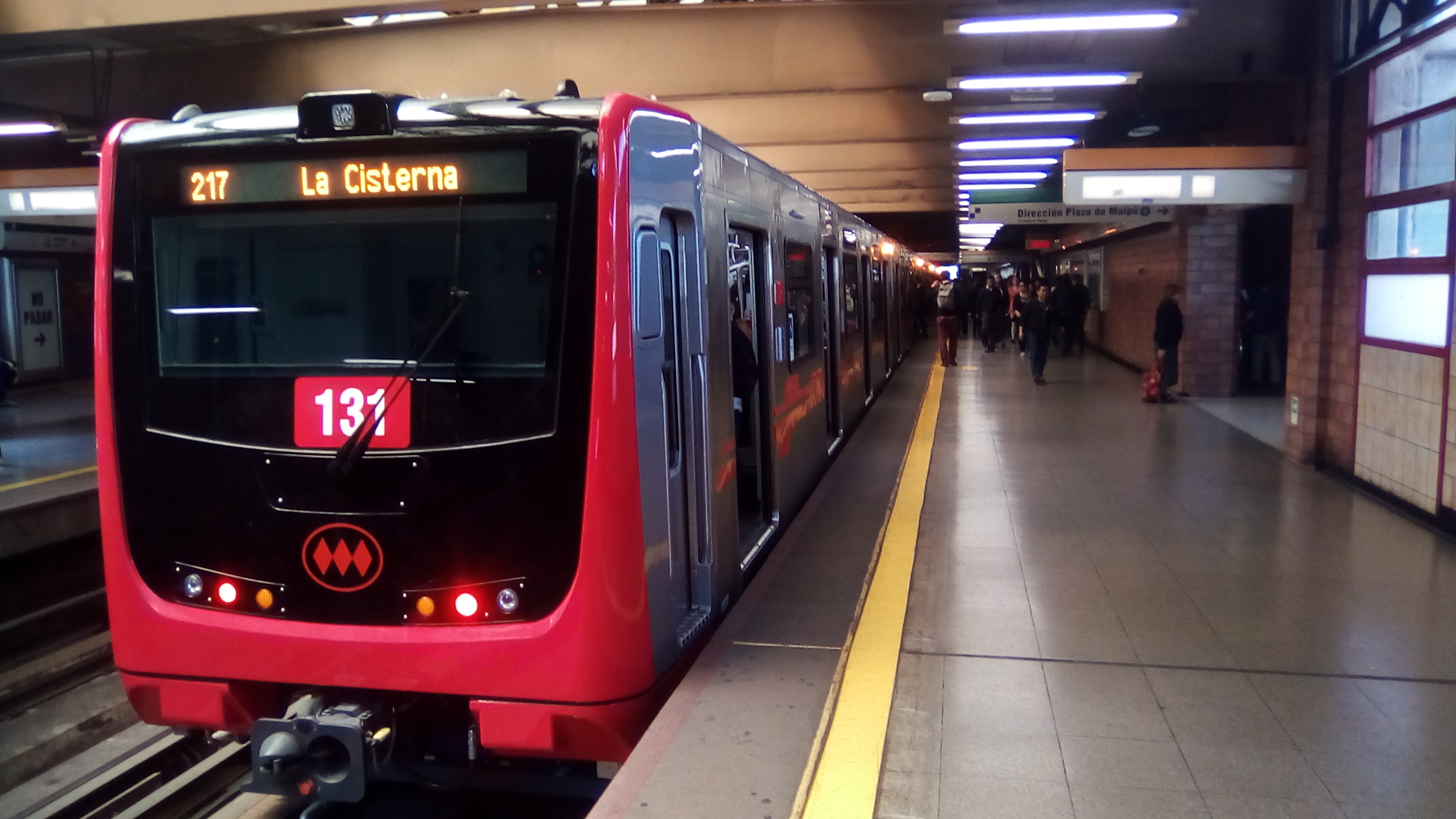
NS-2016

== Stations ==
In bold are transfer stations. In grey are stations projected or currently under construction.

**Line 1** West to East	**Line 2** North to South	**Line 3** Northwest to East	**Line 4** Northeast to Southeast	**Line 4A**; South to Southeast	**Line 5** Southwest to Southeast	**Line 6** Southwest to Northeast	**Line 7** Northwest to Northeast	**Line 8** East to Southeast	**Line 9** North to South
**San Pablo**; Neptuno; Pajaritos; Las Rejas; Ecuador; San Alberto Hurtado; Universidad de Santiago; Estación Central; Unión Latinoamericana; República; **Los Héroes**; La Moneda; **Universidad de Chile**; **Santa Lucía**; Universidad Católica; **Baquedano**; Salvador; Manuel Montt; **Pedro de Valdivia**; **Los Leones**; **Tobalaba**; El Golf; Alcántara; Escuela Militar; Manquehue; Hernando de Magallanes; Los Dominicos	Vespucio Norte; Zapadores; Dorsal; Einstein; Cementerios; Cerro Blanco; Patronato; **Puente Cal y Canto**; **Santa Ana**; **Los Héroes**; Toesca; Parque O'Higgins; Rondizzoni; **Franklin**; El Llano; San Miguel; Lo Vial; Departamental; Ciudad del Niño; Lo Ovalle; El Parrón; **La Cisterna**; El Bosque; Observatorio; Copa Lo Martínez; Hospital El Pino	Plaza Quilicura; Lo Cruzat; Ferrocarril; Los Libertadores; Cardenal Caro; Vivaceta; Conchalí; Plaza Chacabuco; Hospitales; **Puente Cal y Canto**; **Plaza de Armas**; **Universidad de Chile**; Parque Almagro; **Matta**; **Irarrázaval**; Monseñor Eyzaguirre; **Ñuñoa**; **Chile España**; Villa Frei; **Plaza Egaña**; Fernando Castillo Velasco	**Tobalaba**; Cristóbal Colón; Francisco Bilbao; Príncipe de Gales; Simón Bolívar; **Plaza Egaña**; Los Orientales; Grecia; Los Presidentes; Quilín; Las Torres; **Macul**; **Vicuña Mackenna**; **Vicente Valdés**; Rojas Magallanes; Trinidad; San José de la Estrella; Los Quillayes; Elisa Correa; Hospital Sótero del Río; Protectora de la Infancia; Las Mercedes; **Plaza de Puente Alto**	**La Cisterna**; San Ramón; **Santa Rosa**; La Granja; Santa Julia; **Vicuña Mackenna**	Plaza de Maipú; Santiago Bueras; Del Sol; Monte Tabor; Las Parcelas; Laguna Sur; Barrancas; Pudahuel; **San Pablo**; Lo Prado; Blanqueado; Gruta de Lourdes; Quinta Normal; Cumming; **Santa Ana**; **Plaza de Armas**; Bellas Artes; **Baquedano**; Parque Bustamante; Santa Isabel; **Irarrázaval**; **Ñuble**; Rodrigo de Araya; Carlos Valdovinos; Camino Agrícola; San Joaquín; Pedrero; Mirador; Bellavista de La Florida; **Vicente Valdés**	Lo Errázuriz; Cerrillos; Lo Valledor; Presidente Pedro Aguirre Cerda; **Franklin**; **Bío Bío**; **Ñuble**; Estadio Nacional; **Ñuñoa**; Inés de Suárez; **Los Leones**; **Isidora Goyenechea**	Brasil; Infante; Salvador Gutiérrez; **Huelén**; Cerro Navia; Radal; Walker Martínez; Matucana; Mapocho; **Puente Cal y Canto**; **Baquedano**; **Pedro de Valdivia**; **Isidora Goyenechea**; Vitacura; Vespucio; Parque Araucano; Gerónimo de Alderete; Padre Hurtado; Estoril	**Los Leones**; Eliodoro Yañez; Diagonal Oriente; **Chile España**; José Pedro Alessandri; Los Olmos; Vicente Huidobro; Dr. Amador Neghme; **Macul**; La Florida; Rojas Magallanes Oriente; Camilo Henriquez; Diego Portales; El Peral	**Puente Cal y Canto**; **Santa Lucía**; **Matta**; Maule; **Bío Bío**; La Legua; Llico; Sebastopol; Linares; **Santa Rosa**; Hospital Padre Hurtado; La Pintana; Lo Martínez Oriente; Gabriela; La Primavera; Eyzaguirre; Bajos de Mena; Ejército Libertador; **Plaza de Puente Alto**

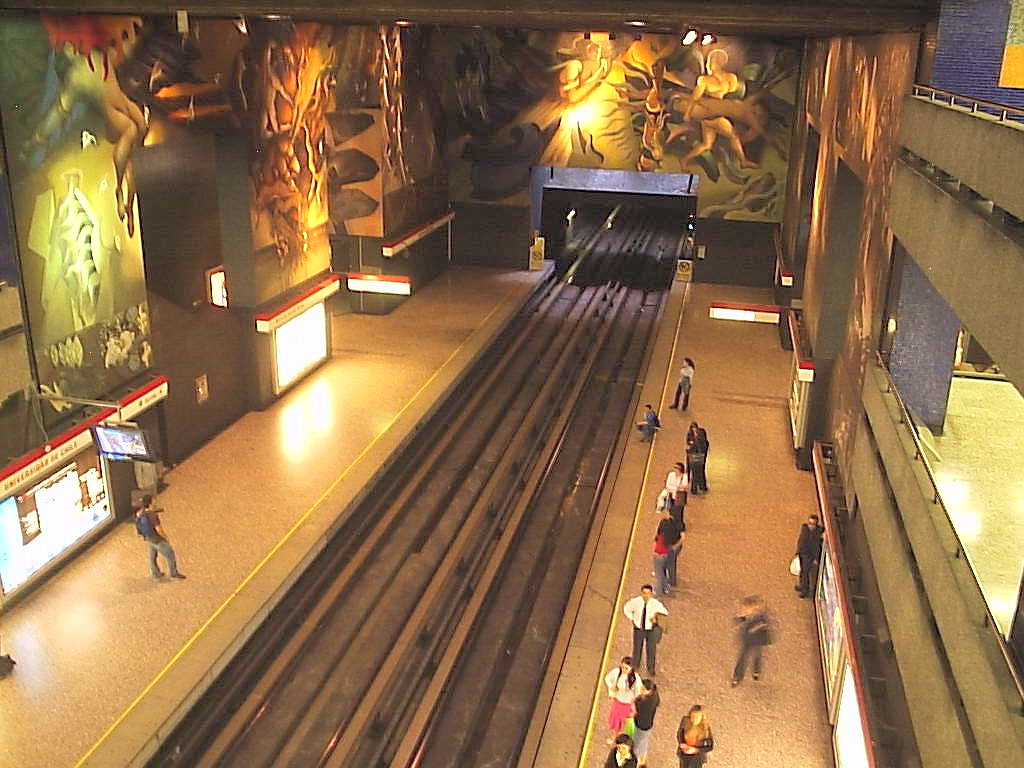
Universidad de Chile

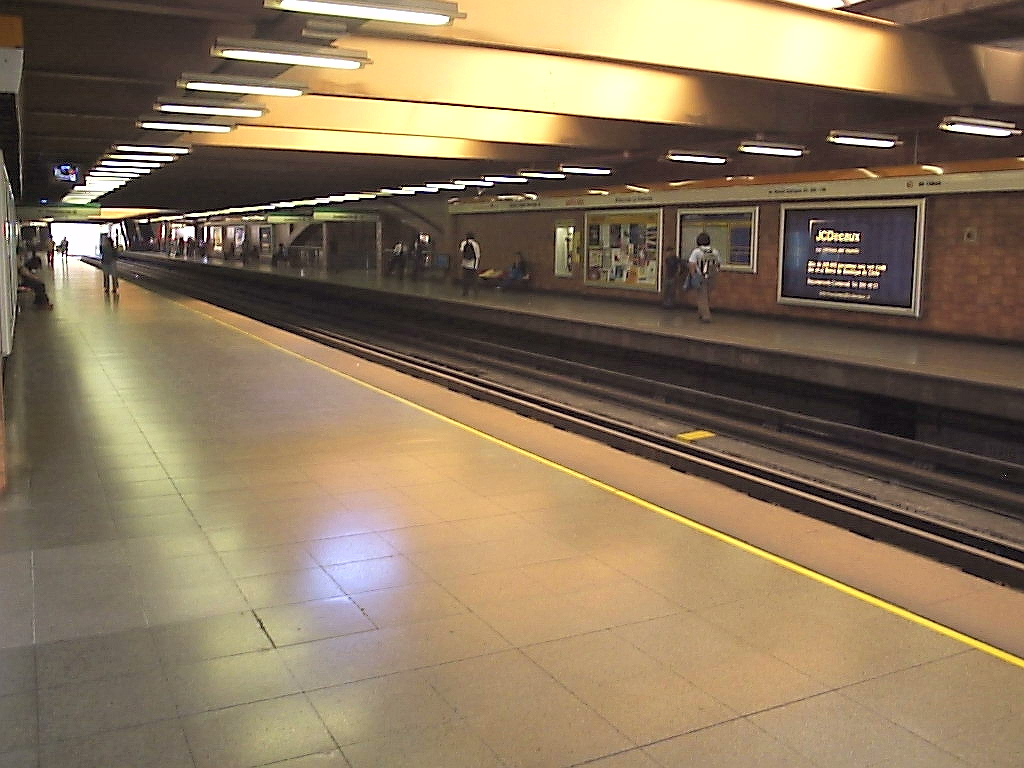
Santa Ana

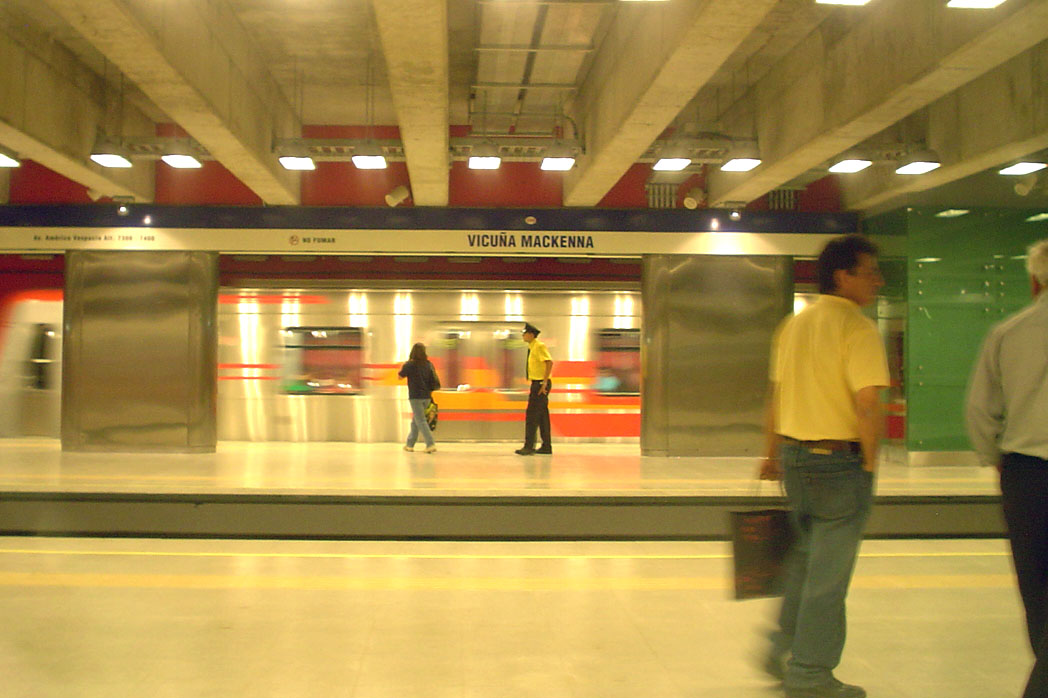
Vicuña Mackenna

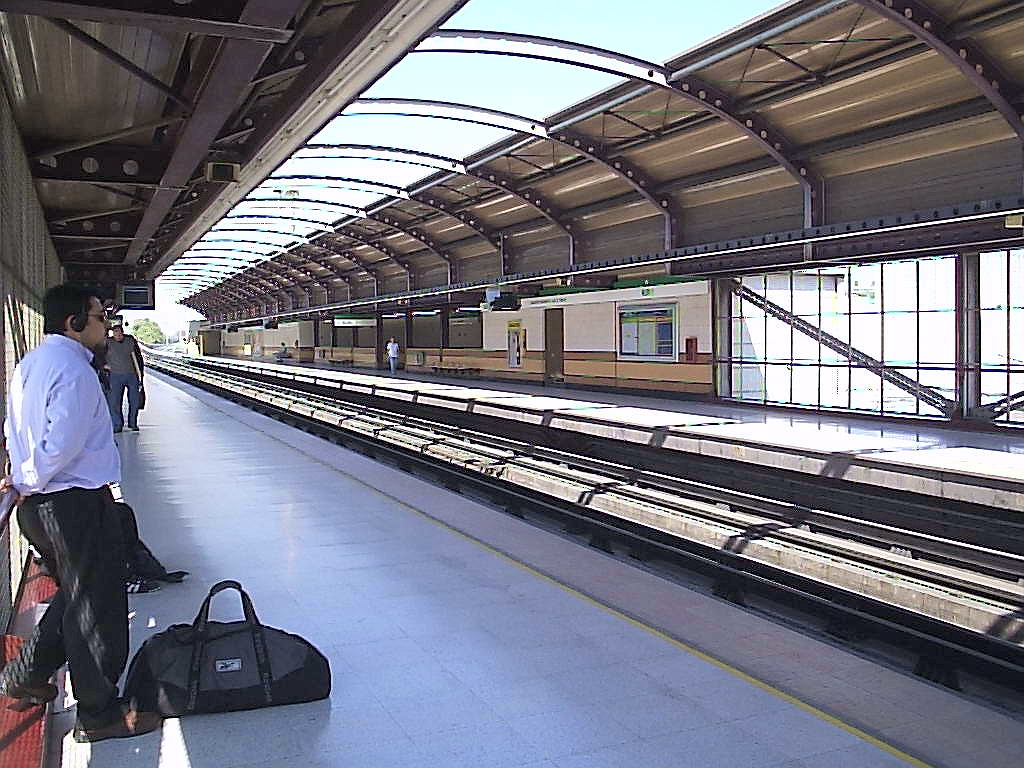
Ñuble

== MetroArte ==
The Santiago Metro incorporates 73 public artworks in its stations through the MetroArte fundation. Universidad de Chile features Memoria visual de una nación ("Visual Memory of a Nation"), a 1,200 square-meter mural created by Chilean painter Mario Toral and represents the history of the country. Other pieces of art are in Baquedano (featuring modern art and a concert space), Bellas Artes (multimedia art), Santa Lucía (Portuguese azulejos, a gift made by the Lisbon Metro), La Moneda (with realistic painting representing typical landscape), and various other stations.

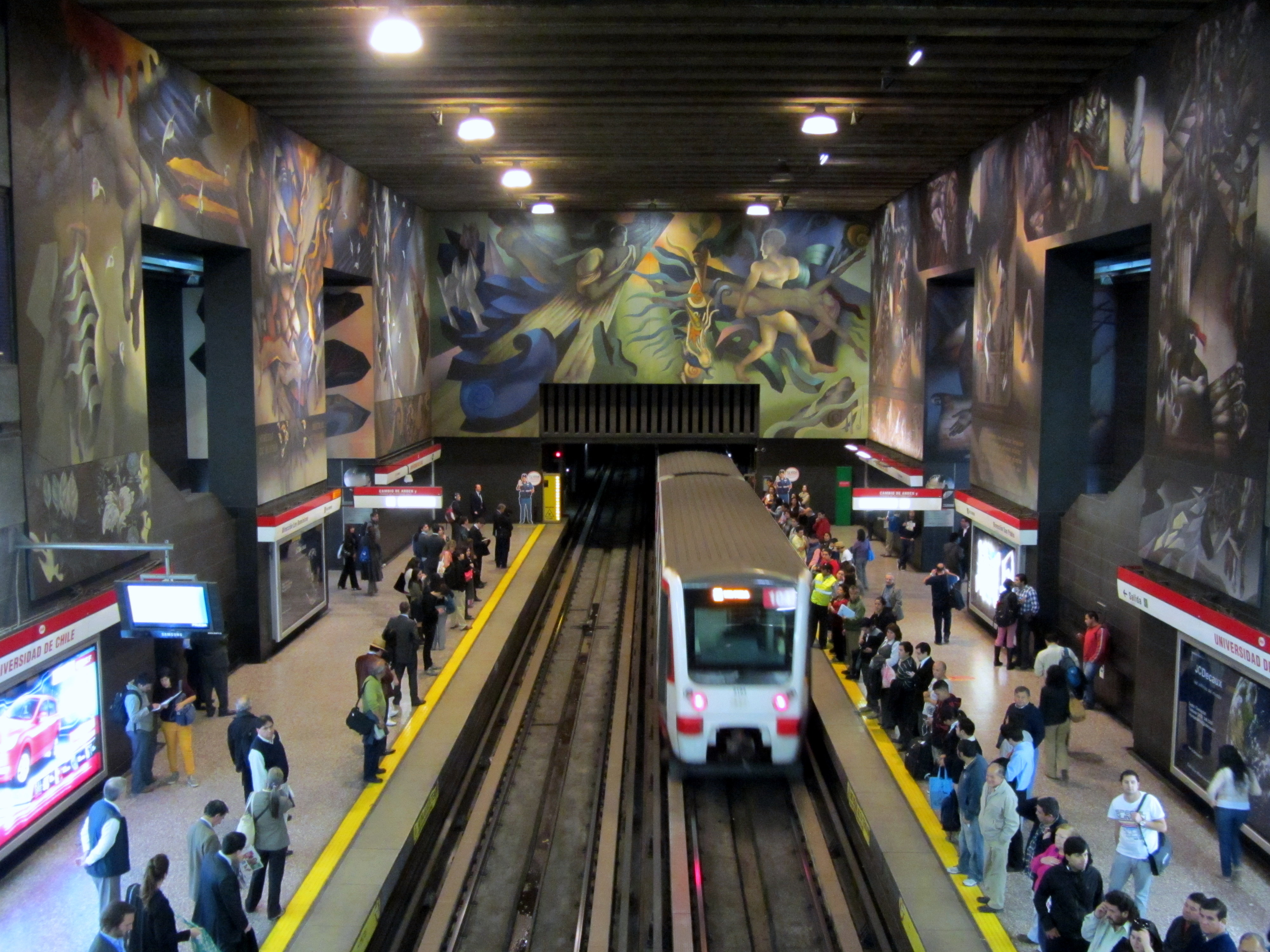
Memoria visual de una nación at Universidad de Chile by Mario Toral.

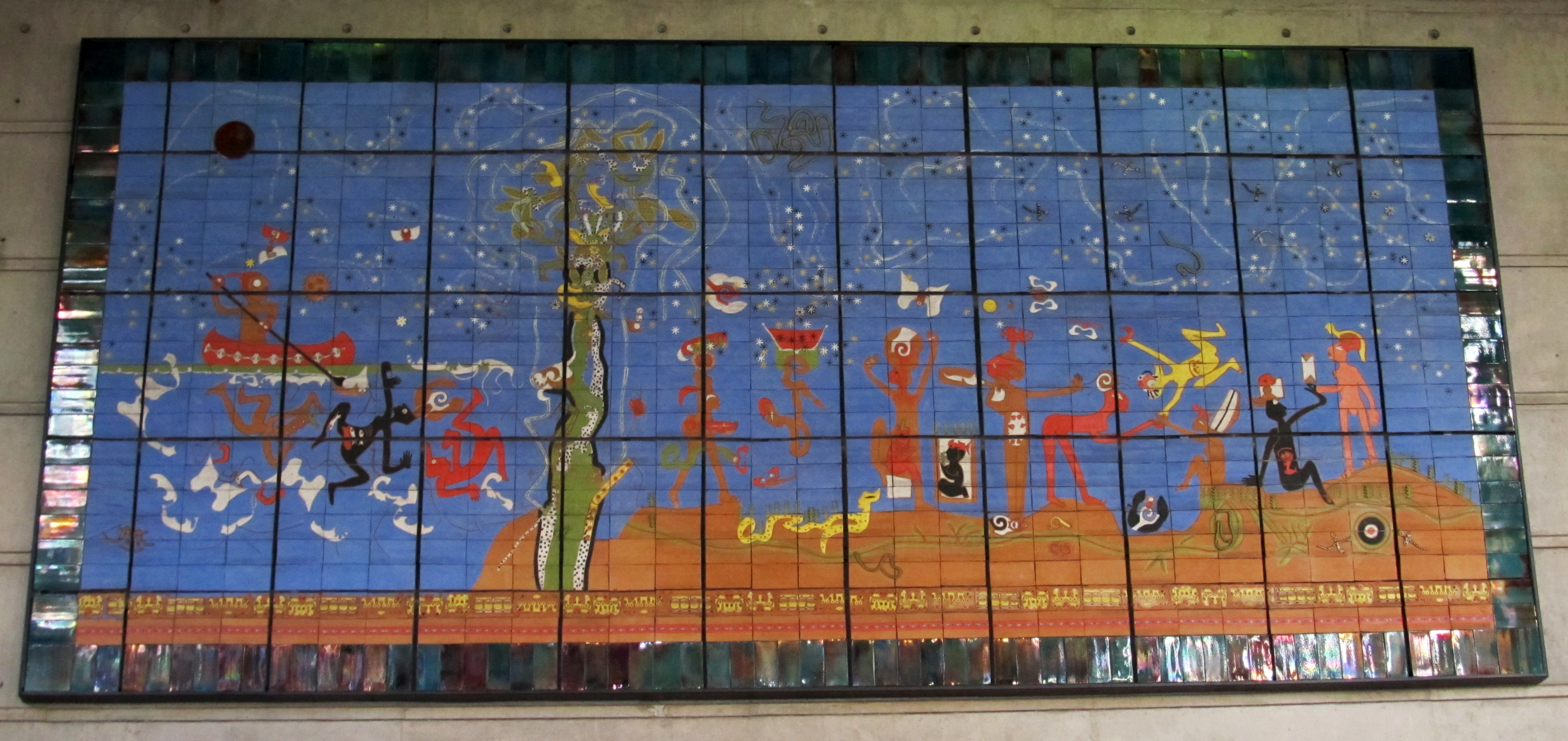
'Verbo América, mural by Roberto Matta

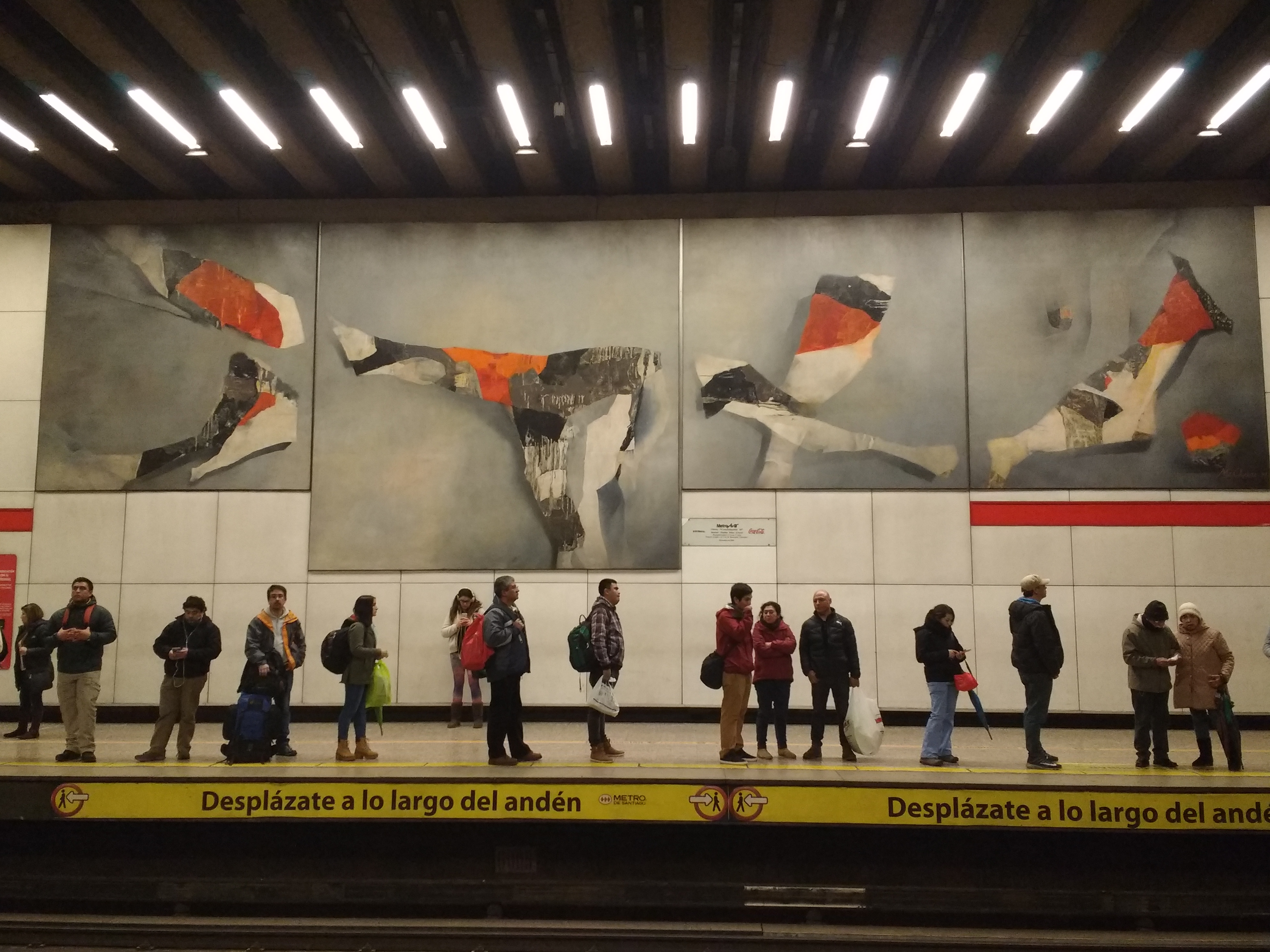
Constelación II by Pablo McClure

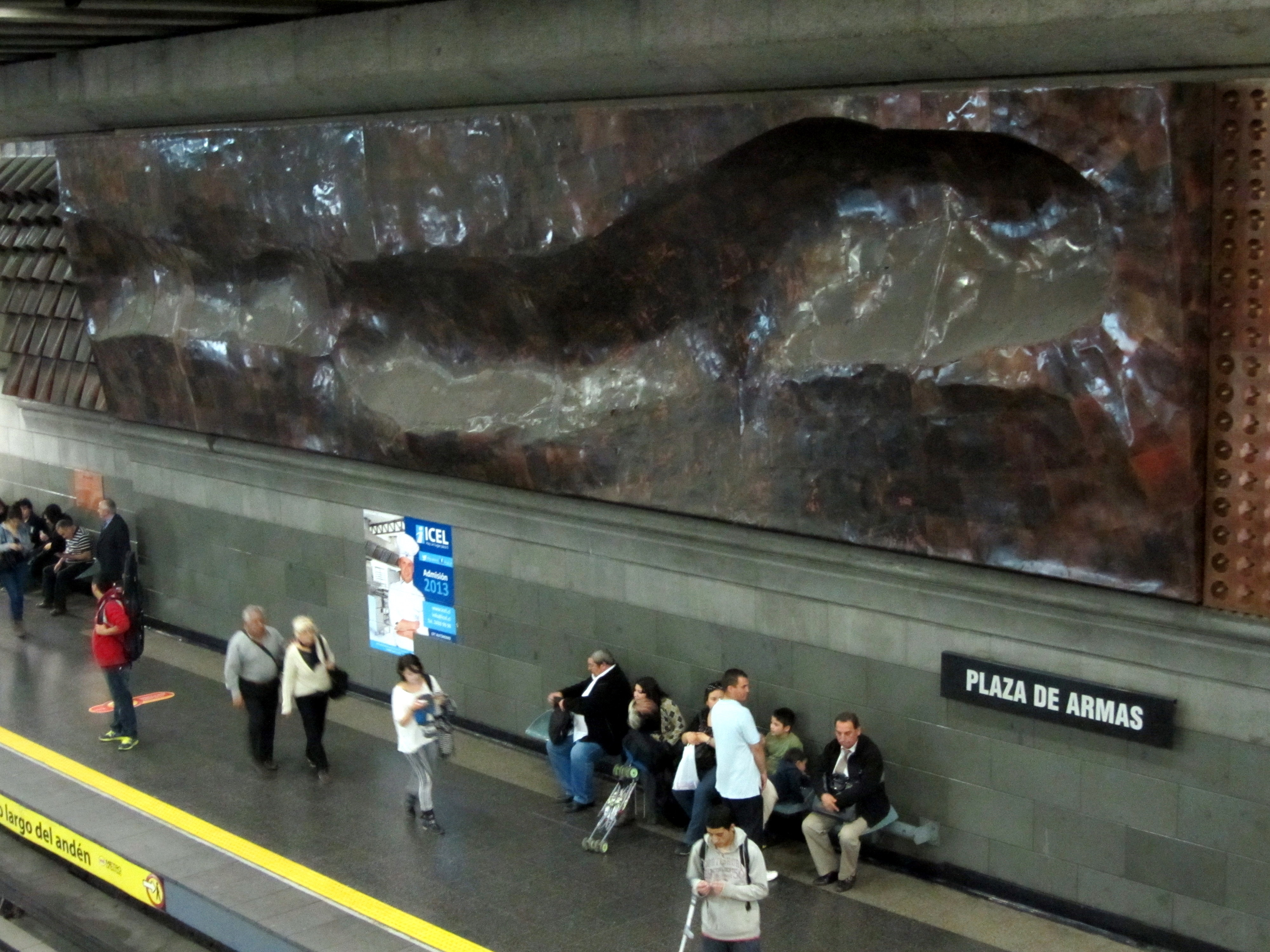
Mural escultórico del cobre by Elisa Aguirre

== Station amenities ==
A diverse array of services are provided within each Metro station. Ticket offices, public telephones and metro-network information panels exist in every station; Redbanc, Cirrus and Plus-enabled ATMs, typically provided by either the Banco de Chile company or the BancoEstado national bank, are common. Automatic recharge machines are also common, with all such machines charging a customer's Bip! card with either cash deposits or a Redbanc-enabled card. In higher-traffic stations, there are screens that display MetroTV, featuring additional system information as well as music videos and short news segments.

Some 21 of the busiest stations contain a branch of Bibliometro, a system of lending libraries supported by the national Department of Libraries, Archives and Museums (Dibam). A Chilean ID or foreign passport allows any Metro customer to freely borrow from a reserve of books and other literature, but a registration is needed first.

Customers may rent a parking space for their bicycles through the Bicimetro network, which opened in 2008 at six stations and is slowly expanding, for a starting cost of $300 (approximately US$0.50) a day. There are weekly and monthly rental services too, that guarantee a fixed space for the bike (contrary to the daily rent which relies on random free-space).

Most underground Metro stations contain at least one shop or convenience store, with large line-transfer stations such as Baquedano featuring several food vendors and retailers, and even a small underground "shopping center" in Universidad de Chile.

=== Security and safety ===
Various private security agencies have day-to-day responsibility for maintaining order in the metro and deterring petty crime or attempts to board without paying. The largest transfer stations, such as Tobalaba, also feature depots of the Carabineros de Chile, the national military police force. Metro staff man the ticket counters in closed box offices and distribute tickets and money through small transaction windows.

Signage to advise customers of safety hazards is extensive, and each platform has a painted yellow line which customers are advised to not cross except to board a train. During rush hour, Metro staff line the platform edge to keep people from being crowded off the platform and to support disabled customers. There is no physical barrier between the edge and the tracks (with the exception of recently opened Lines 3 and 6), including the hazardous, electrified third rail. However, lines 3 and 6 use overhead lines as the powersource of the trains.

Metro travelers are advised to keep a close guard on their belongings, as petty or opportunistic theft is somewhat of a problem in lines that connect some districts to the center of Santiago. This is most apparent with passengers who reverse their backpacks so that the bag is across the stomach, to ensure that no one can pilfer the pockets out of sight.

== Pricing and working hours ==
Fare time windows, weekdays only

Metro is part of Red Metropolitana de Movilidad, the integrated public transport system that serves the capital, which also incorporates the Santiago bus system and the Nos-Central Station train. Red works with an integrated fare system that allows passengers to make up to two transfers on a two-hour time limit from the start of the trip, with the price of the entire journey being that of the highest individual fare in the trip.

Fare payments are made through Red's payment system, Tarjeta bip!, using one of its two methods, the contactless smart card bip!, or the QR code payment bip!QR. Metro and the Nos train also accept contactless bank cards.

Fare prices for the Santiago Metro
	Peak	Off-Peak	Super Off-Peak
Mon-Fri	$895	$815	$735
Sat, Sun	$815		
Holidays	$815		

Senior citizens may use the Metro-exclusive TAM card for a flat fee of $260, or the RED-wide bip! Adulto Mayor for $390. Students using a TNE card pay $260.

Stations open at 6:00 on weekdays, 6:30 on Saturdays and 7:30 on Sundays and holidays. They close at 23:00 irrespective of the day of the week.

== See also ==
- List of Latin American rail transit systems by ridership
- List of metro systems
- Rail transport in Chile
