= Estación Central metro station =

Santiago metro station

Estación Central
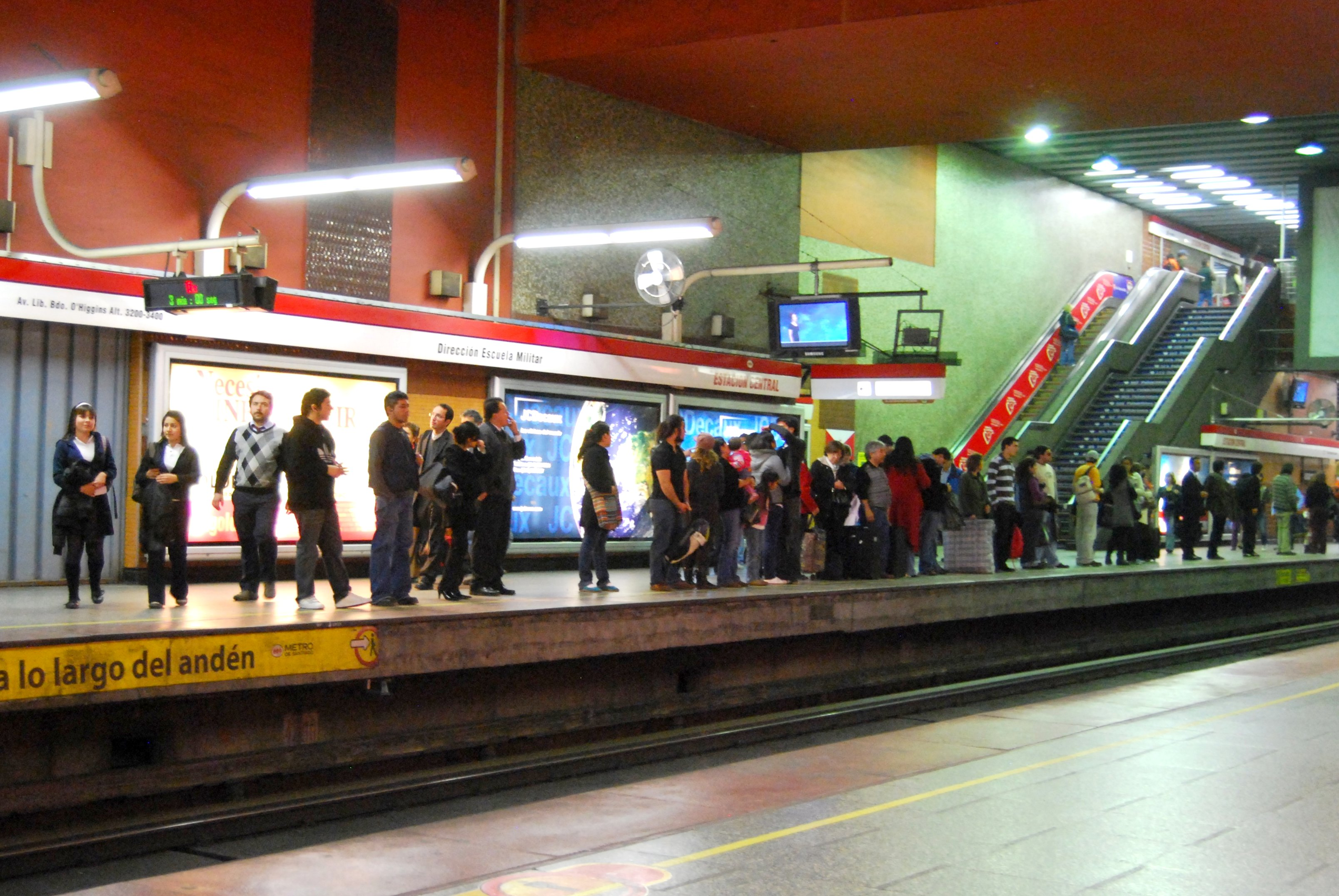

General information
- Location: Alameda / Matucana Avenue
- Coordinates: 33°27′3″S 70°40′44″W
- System: Santiago rapid transit
- Line: Line 1
- Platforms: 2 side platforms
- Tracks: 2
- Connections: Metrotrén, Transantiago buses

History
- Opened: 15 September 1975

Services
Preceding station	Santiago Metro	Following station
Universidad de Santiago towards San Pablo	Line 1	Unión Latinoamericana towards Los Dominicos
Location

Estación Central (Spanish for "Central Station") is a station on the Santiago Metro in Santiago, Chile. It is underground, between the stations Universidad de Santiago and Unión Latinoamericana on the same line. It is located on the Avenida Libertador General Bernardo O'Higgins, in the commune of Estación Central.

The station was opened on 15 September 1975 as part of the inaugural section of the line between San Pablo and La Moneda. It is named for the nearby Santiago Estación Central.
