= List of the Americas rail transit systems by ridership =

This is a list of the Americas rapid transit systems by ridership. These heavy rail or rapid transit systems are also known as metro or subway systems. This list of systems in the Americas does not include light rail, even when they are integrated with heavy rail. Daily and annual ridership figures are based on "average weekday unlinked passenger trips" (where transfers between lines are counted as two separate passenger "boardings" or "trips"), unless otherwise indicated (e.g., Mexico City and Monterrey, whose figures are the average for all days, not just weekdays). For metro systems in the United States (including Puerto Rico) and Canada, the annual ridership figures for 2019 and average weekday ridership figures for the Fourth Quarter (Q4) of 2019 come from the American Public Transportation Association's (APTA) ridership reports statistics, unless otherwise noted. Ridership figures for Mexico come from Banco de Información Económica's INEGI reports for the year 2014. Ridership figures for the Dominican Republic come from the Directorate of Operations Santo Domingo Metro report for the year 2013.

	System	Country	City/area served	Annual ridership (2019)	Avg. daily weekday boardings (Q4 2019)	System length	Avg. daily boardings per mile (Q4 2019)	Year opened	Stations	Lines	Date
1	New York City Subway	USA	New York City	2,123,960,100	5,819,068	248 miles (399 km)	23,463	1904 (Note: The current system incorporates elevated sections built in 1870.)	472	24	
2	Mexico City Metro	Mexico	Mexico City	1,591,984,000 (Note: This Annual Ridership figure for 2014 is obtained by averaging the Average Daily Ridership for the twelve months in 2014, and then multiplying that figure by the number of days in a year.)	4,361,600 (Note: This is the Average Daily Ridership figure, not an Average Weekday Ridership figure – it is averaged from the Q4 2014 Total Ridership figure for this system.)	140.75 miles (226.5 km)	30,984	1969	195	12	
3	São Paulo Metro	BRA	São Paulo	1,256,000,000 (Note: Not considering lines 7, 8, 9, 10, 11, 12 and 13. The complete network is 377 km long, has 13 lines, 187 stations, and carries 1,969,400,000 passengers annually.)	3,278,082 (Note: This is the Average Daily Ridership figure, not an Average Weekday Ridership figure - it is averaged from the 2023 Total Ridership figure for this system.)	104 km (64.6 mi)	31,520	1974	91	6	2024
4	São Paulo Metropolitan Trains Company	BRA	São Paulo	867,700,000	2,900,000	273 km (169.6 mi)	10,622	1992	94	7	2019
5	Caracas Metro	VEN	Caracas	484,600,000	3,300,000	52.4 km (32.6 mi)	25,337	1983	48	4	2019
6	Santiago Metro	CHI	Santiago	670,100,000	2,200,000	140 km (87.0 mi)	17,255	1975	136	7	2019
7	MetrôRio	BRA	Rio de Janeiro	401,500,000	1,100,000	58 km (36.0 mi)	26,830	1979	35	2	2012
8	Montreal Metro	Canada	Montreal	400,280,900	1,421,200	43 miles (69 km)	33,051	1966	68	4	
9	Subte	ARG	Buenos Aires	365,000,000	1,000,000	54.9 km (34.1 mi)	18,214	1913	87	6	2019
10	Toronto subway (Note: Totals represent the sum of the "Heavy Rail (HR)" and "Intermediate Rail (IR)" figures for Toronto from the APTA ridership report – in other words, figures include stations and ridership on Line 3 Scarborough (RT), which APTA considers to be an IR line and which the Toronto Transit Commission includes in the rapid transit system for mapping and administrative purposes.)	Canada	Toronto	331,483,300	1,602,300	47.8 miles (76.9 km)	33,520	1954	75	4	
11	Washington Metro	USA	Washington, D.C. Metropolitan Area	237,701,100	816,700	129 miles (208 km)	6,532	1976	97	6	
12	Chicago 'L'	USA	Chicago	218,467,000	695,300	226 miles (364 km)	5,679	1894	150	8	
13	Medellín Metro	COL	Medellín	206,101,000	530,000	31.3 km (19.4 mi)	16,933	1995	27	2	2018
14	Metrorrey	Mexico	Monterrey	180,818,000	512,100	25 miles (40 km)	25,605	1991	40	3	
15	Lima Metro	PER	Lima	124,134,820	554,000	34.6 km (21.5 mi)	10,250	1990/2011	26	1	12/2014
16	Sistema de Tren Eléctrico Urbano	MEX	Guadalajara	103,649,000	283,970	47 km (29.2 mi)	10,000	1989	48	3	2018
17	Recife Metro	BRA	Recife	79,600,000	285,000	44.2 km (27.5 mi)	6,448	1985	30	4	2012
18	SkyTrain	Canada	Vancouver	165,104,000	495,800	49.4 miles (79.5 km)	10,036	1985	53	3	
19	MBTA subway (Note: This rapid transit system is integrated with a light rail system; only the parts of the system that are rapid transit/metro, and that are not light rail, are counted in the statistics presented here.) (Blue, Orange, and Red Lines)	USA	Boston	152,339,700	475,300	38 miles (61 km)	13,408	1901	53	4	
20	BART	USA	San Francisco; Bay Area	123,510,100	421,100	131.4 miles (211.5 km)	4,006	1972	48	6	
21	SEPTA (Broad Street (Orange), Market–Frankford (Blue), and Norristown High Speed Lines)	USA	Philadelphia	90,240,800	329,200	36.7 miles (59.1 km)	8,929	1907	75	3	
22	PATH	USA	Jersey City, Newark, NJ	90,276,600	306,700	13.8 miles (22.2 km)	22,464	1908	13	5	
23	MARTA	USA	Atlanta	63,998,500	–	48 miles (77 km)	4,288	1979	38	4	
24	Panama Metro	Panama	Panama City	n/a	180,000	22.9 miles (36.9 km)	21,176	2014	12	1	
25	Santo Domingo Metro	Dominican Republic	Santo Domingo	61,270,054	177,844	17.0 miles (27.4 km)	10,461	2009	30	2	
26	Trensurb	BRA	Porto Alegre	62,000,000	170,000	39 km (24.2 mi)	4,359	1985	19	1	2011
27	Belo Horizonte Metro	BRA	Belo Horizonte	57,419,280	157,300	28.1 km (17.5 mi)	5,598	1986	19	1	2012
28	Federal District Metro	BRA	Brasília	54,750,000	150,000	42.4 km (26.3 mi)	3,538	2001	24	2	2009
29	Mexico City Light Rail	MEX	Mexico City	21,000,000	57,534	12.8 km (8.0 mi)	4,495	1986	18	1	2007
30	Valparaíso Metro	CHI	Valparaíso	20,120,000	55,123	43 km (26.7 mi)	1,096	2005	20	1	2013
31	Valencia Metro	VEN	Valencia	17,200,000	62,000	6.2 km (3.9 mi)	10,000	2006	7	1	2012
32	Los Teques Metro (Note: The Los Teques Metro is generally considered to be part of the Caracas Metro.)	VEN	Los Teques/Caracas	13,000,000	35,616	10.2 km (6.3 mi)	3,490	2006	3	1	08/2013
33	Metro Rail (B and D Lines)	USA	Los Angeles	41,775,100	130,900	17.4 miles (28.0 km)	7,994	1993	16	2	
34	Miami Metrorail	USA	Miami	18,073,100	62,600	24.9 miles (40.1 km)	2,723	1984	23	2	
35	PATCO Speedline	USA	Philadelphia	11,107,500	38,400	14.2 miles (22.9 km)	2,732	1936	13	1	
36	Staten Island Railway	USA	New York City	7,741,000	18,500	14.0 miles (22.5 km)	2,100	1860	22	1	
37	Baltimore Metro Subway	USA	Baltimore	7,325,500	36,600	15.5 miles (24.9 km)	884	1983	14	1	
38	RTA Rapid Transit (Red Line)	USA	Cleveland	5,958,000	15,900	19 miles (31 km)	1,000	1955	18	1	
39	Tren Urbano	Puerto Rico (US)	San Juan	5,233,900	20,300	10.7 miles (17.2 km)	1,963	2004	16	1	
40	Maracaibo Metro	VEN	Maracaibo	9,000,000	42,000	6.5 km (4.0 mi)	3,490	2006	6	1	2011
41	Teresina Metro (Note: Uses diesel rail vehicles, rather than the electrified vehicles used on rapid transit systems.)	BRA	Teresina	4,300,000	12,000	14.5 km (9.0 mi)	828	1989	9	1	2009
41	Fortaleza Metro	BRA	Fortaleza	n/a	n/a	43 km (26.7 mi)	n/a	2012	28	2	n/a
43	Metrotranvía Mendoza	ARG	Mendoza	n/a	n/a	12.5 km (7.8 mi)	n/a	2012	26	1	n/a
44	Salvador Metro	BRA	Salvador	n/a	300,000 (Projected)	30 km (18.6 mi)	n/a	2014	19	2	n/a
45	Maceió Metro	BRA	Maceió	n/a	40,000 (Projected)	32 km (19.9 mi)	n/a	1997	n/a	1	n/a
46	Cariri Metro	BRA	Crato–Juazeiro	n/a	5,000	13.9 km (8.6 mi)	360	2009	9	1	n/a
47	Quito Metro	ECU	Quito	n/a	n/a	22 km (13.7 mi)	n/a	2023	15	1	2022
48	Skyline (Honolulu)	USA	Honolulu	n/a	n/a	17.4 km (10.8 mi)	n/a	2023	9	1	2023

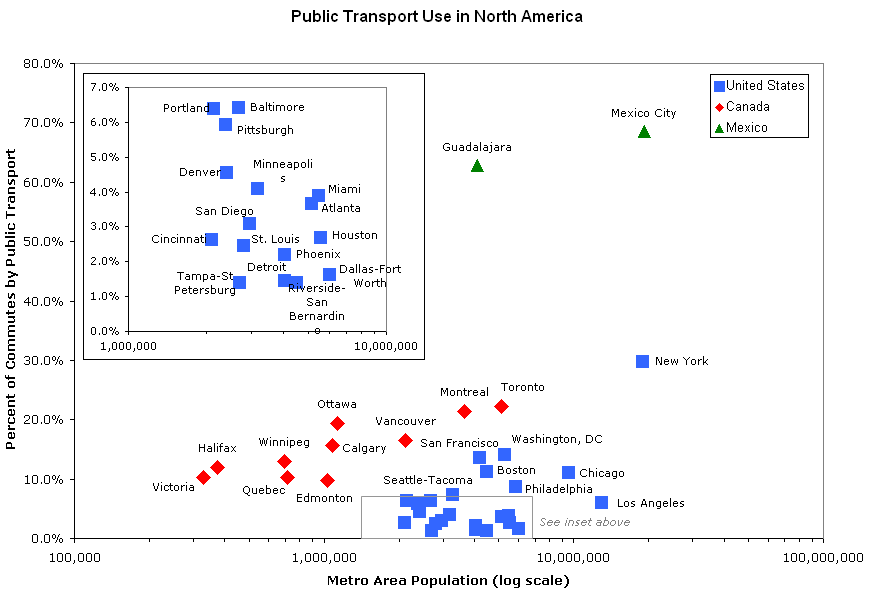
For a given population size, New York, some Mexican and Canadian cities tend to have higher public transit usage. (Note: This data goes beyond rapid transit and encompasses all public transport, including modes such as buses)
