= República metro station (Santiago) =

Santiago metro station

República
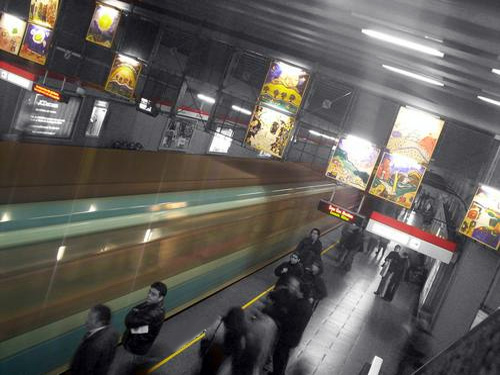

General information
- Location: Alameda / Cumming Avenue
- Coordinates: 33°26′52″S 70°40′3″W
- System: Santiago rapid transit
- Line: Line 1
- Platforms: 2 side platforms
- Tracks: 2
- Connections: Transantiago buses

History
- Opened: September 15, 1975

Services
Preceding station	Santiago Metro	Following station
Unión Latinoamericana towards San Pablo	Line 1	Los Héroes towards Los Dominicos
Location

República is an underground metro station on the Line 1 of the Santiago Metro, in Santiago, Chile. This station is named for República Avenue. The station was opened on 15 September 1975 as part of the inaugural section of the line between San Pablo and La Moneda.

Like most underground Line 1 stations, it has two levels below street level: the central mezzanine and the platform level. There are three entrances from street level. The only exit on the north side of Alameda Avenue leads to the Barrio Concha y Toro. The portions of the walls along the platforms that are under the station name signs are painted yellow, which originally featured small square mosaic tiles.

The station's artwork, installed in December 2000, is entitled La República de los Niños (The Republic Of The Children) and consists of paintings on ceramic tiles, which were created by children with the support of Chilean artists.
