= Carlos Valdovinos metro station =

Santiago metro station

Carlos Valdovinos
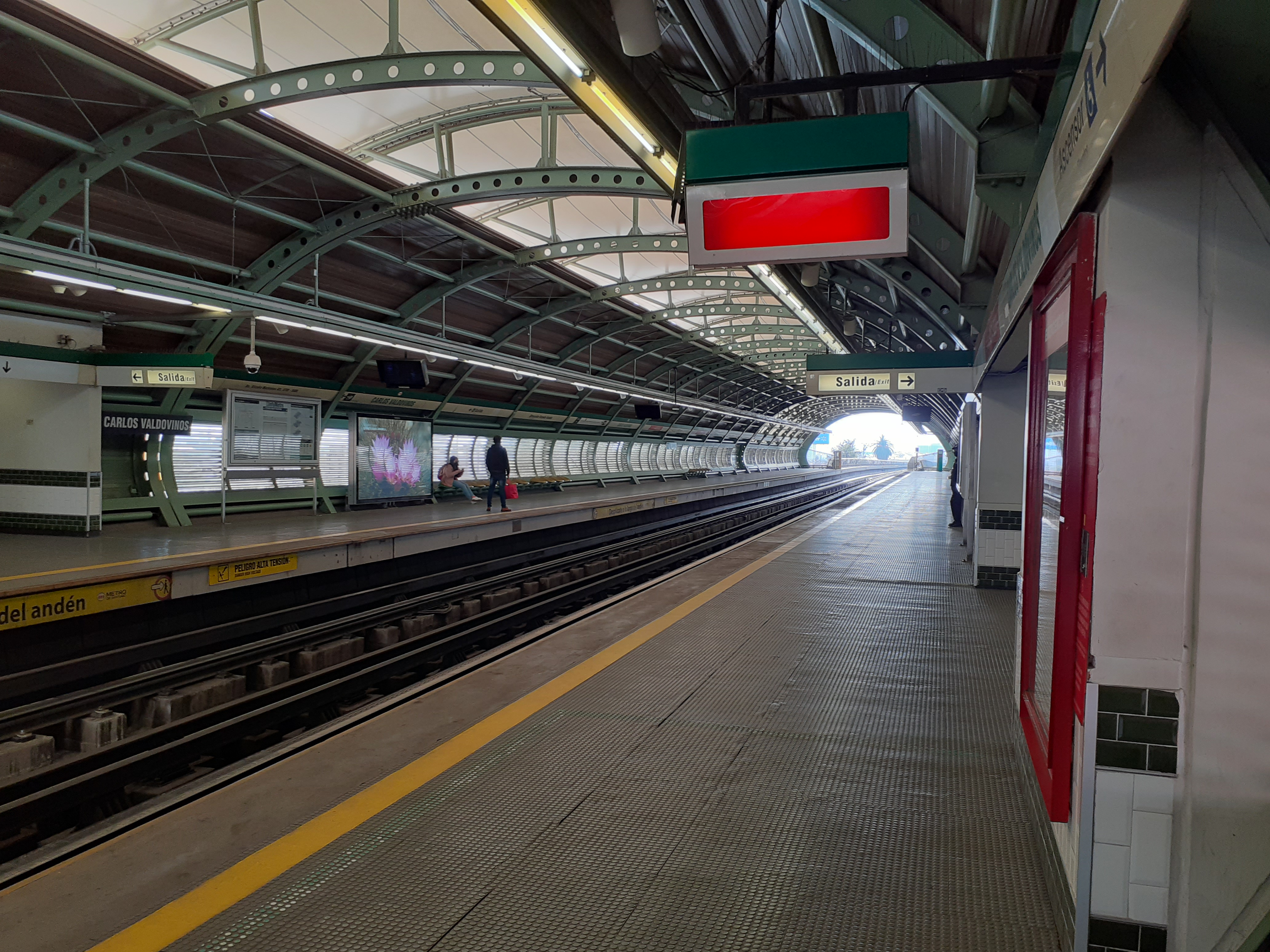

General information
- Location: Vicuña Mackenna Avenue / Carlos Valdovinos Avenue
- Coordinates: 33°29′11.54″S 70°37′8.87″W
- System: Santiago rapid transit
- Line: Line 5
- Platforms: 2 side platforms
- Tracks: 2
- Connections: Transantiago buses

Construction
- Accessible: yes

History
- Opened: April 5, 1997

Services
Preceding station	Santiago Metro	Following station
Rodrigo de Araya towards Plaza de Maipú	Line 5	Camino Agrícola towards Vicente Valdés
Location

Carlos Valdovinos is an elevated metro station on the Line 5 of the Santiago Metro, in Santiago, Chile. Platforms were lengthened in 2012 to accommodate seven-car trains. The station was opened on 5 April 1997 as part of the inaugural section of the line, from Baquedano to Bellavista de La Florida.

The station has the shape of a tube with an elliptical cross section. Staircases protrude from both sides of the station.

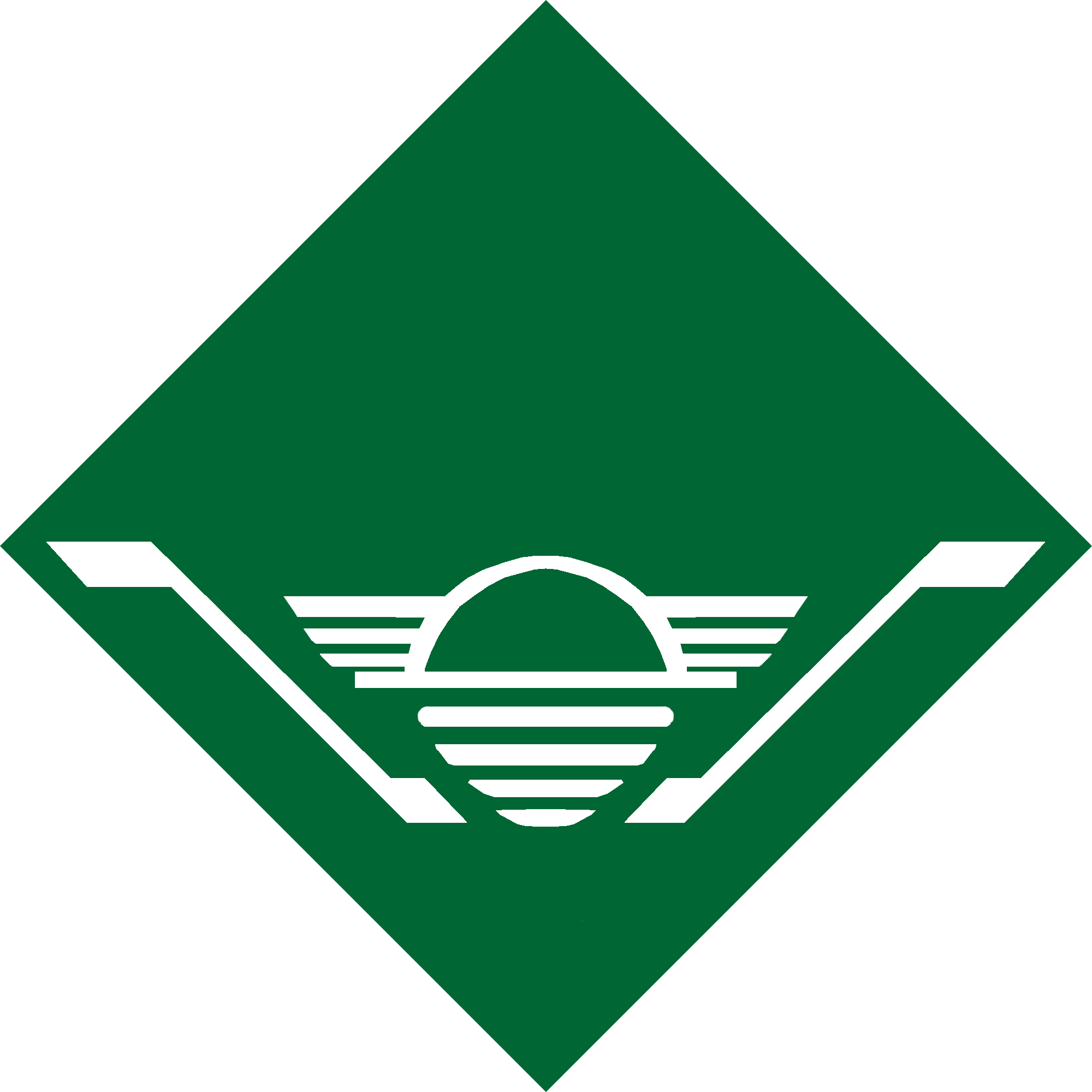
Old symbol with which the station was identified.
