= San Joaquín metro station (Santiago) =

Santiago metro station

San Joaquín
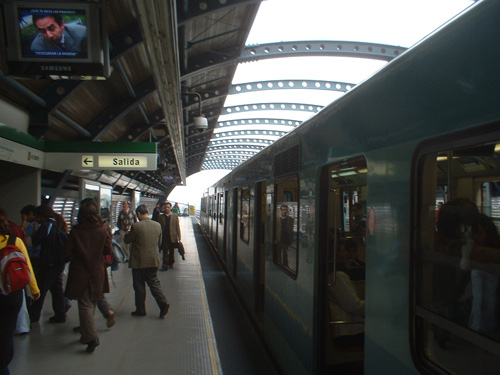

General information
- Location: Vicuña Mackenna Avenue / Raquel Street
- Coordinates: 33°29′57.2″S 70°36′57.5″W
- System: Santiago rapid transit
- Line: Line 5
- Platforms: 2 side platforms
- Tracks: 2
- Connections: Transantiago buses

Construction
- Accessible: yes

History
- Opened: April 5, 1997

Services
Preceding station	Santiago Metro	Following station
Camino Agrícola towards Plaza de Maipú	Line 5	Pedrero towards Vicente Valdés
Location

San Joaquín is an elevated metro station on the Line 5 of the Santiago Metro, in Santiago, Chile. It is located close to the San Joaquín Campus of the Pontifical Catholic University of Chile. The station was opened on 5 April 1997 as part of the inaugural section of the line, from Baquedano to Bellavista de La Florida.

Like the rest of the first stations built on a viaduct in Santiago, San Joaquín was renovated to be capable of berthing 7-car trains. The renovation work was terminated in March 2013.

Old symbol with which the station was identified.
