= Rodrigo de Araya metro station =

Santiago metro station

Rodrigo de Araya
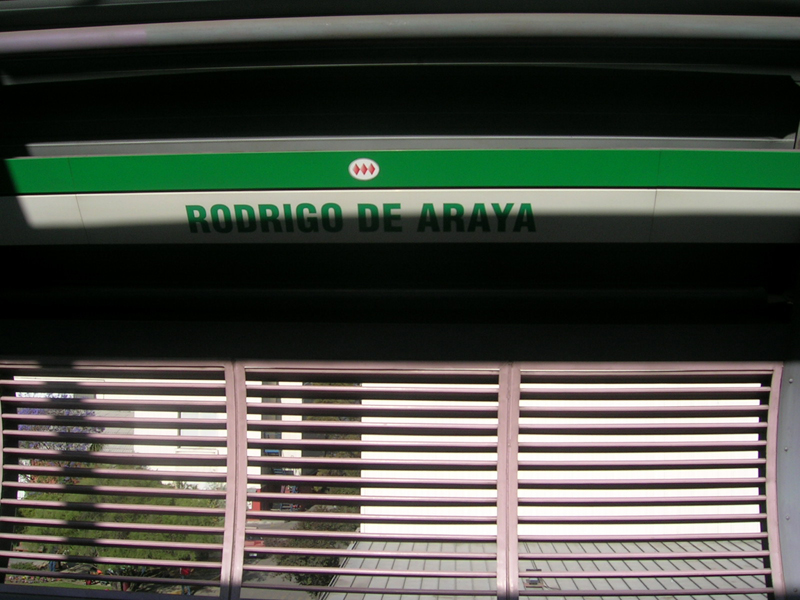

General information
- Location: Vicuña Mackenna Avenue / Santa Elena Street
- Coordinates: 33°28′39.44″S 70°37′20.25″W
- System: Santiago rapid transit
- Line: Line 5
- Platforms: 2 side platforms
- Tracks: 2
- Connections: Transantiago buses

Construction
- Accessible: yes

History
- Opened: April 5, 1997

Services
Preceding station	Santiago Metro	Following station
Ñuble towards Plaza de Maipú	Line 5	Carlos Valdovinos towards Vicente Valdés
Location

Rodrigo de Araya is an elevated metro station on the Line 5 of the Santiago Metro, in Santiago, Chile. The station consists of an elliptical cylindrical structure enclosing the side platforms and tracks. Staircases jut out from the tubular structure and lead to the concourse level, which is located below the viaduct deck. The station was opened on 5 April 1997 as part of the inaugural section of the line, from Baquedano to Bellavista de La Florida.

In 2012, the platforms were enlarged from 108 m (354 ft) to 135 m (443 ft), to support seven-car trains. The renovation project included the use of tensile roofing structures to cover the newer portion of the station, as well as the open portion of the original station.
