= Camino Agrícola metro station =

Santiago metro station

Camino Agrícola
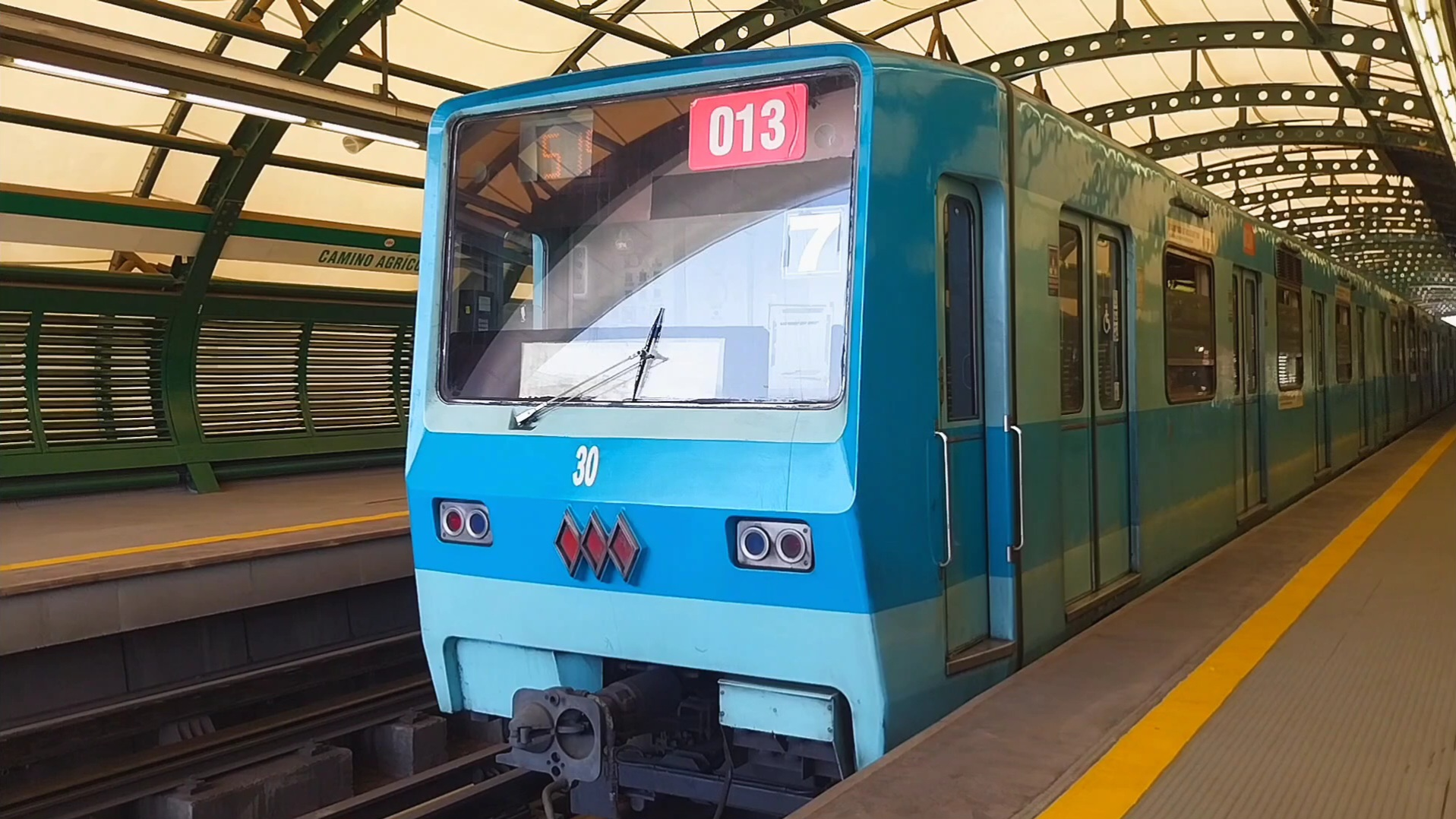

General information
- Location: Vicuña Mackenna Avenue / Escuela Agrícola Street
- Coordinates: 33°29′30.81″S 70°37′3.1″W
- System: Santiago rapid transit
- Line: Line 5
- Platforms: 2 side platforms
- Tracks: 2
- Connections: Transantiago buses

Construction
- Accessible: yes

History
- Opened: April 5, 1997

Services
Preceding station	Santiago Metro	Following station
Carlos Valdovinos towards Plaza de Maipú	Line 5	San Joaquín towards Vicente Valdés
Location

Camino Agrícola is an elevated metro station on the Line 5 of the Santiago Metro, in Santiago, Chile. It is similar in design as the adjacent stations. The station was opened on 5 April 1997 as part of the inaugural section of the line, from Baquedano to Bellavista de La Florida.

The station originally had two side platforms 108 m (354 ft) long and accommodated five-car trains, but in 2012 these were extended to 135 m (443 ft) and seven-car lengths.

Old symbol with which the station was identified.
