= Lo Prado metro station =

Santiago metro station

Lo Prado
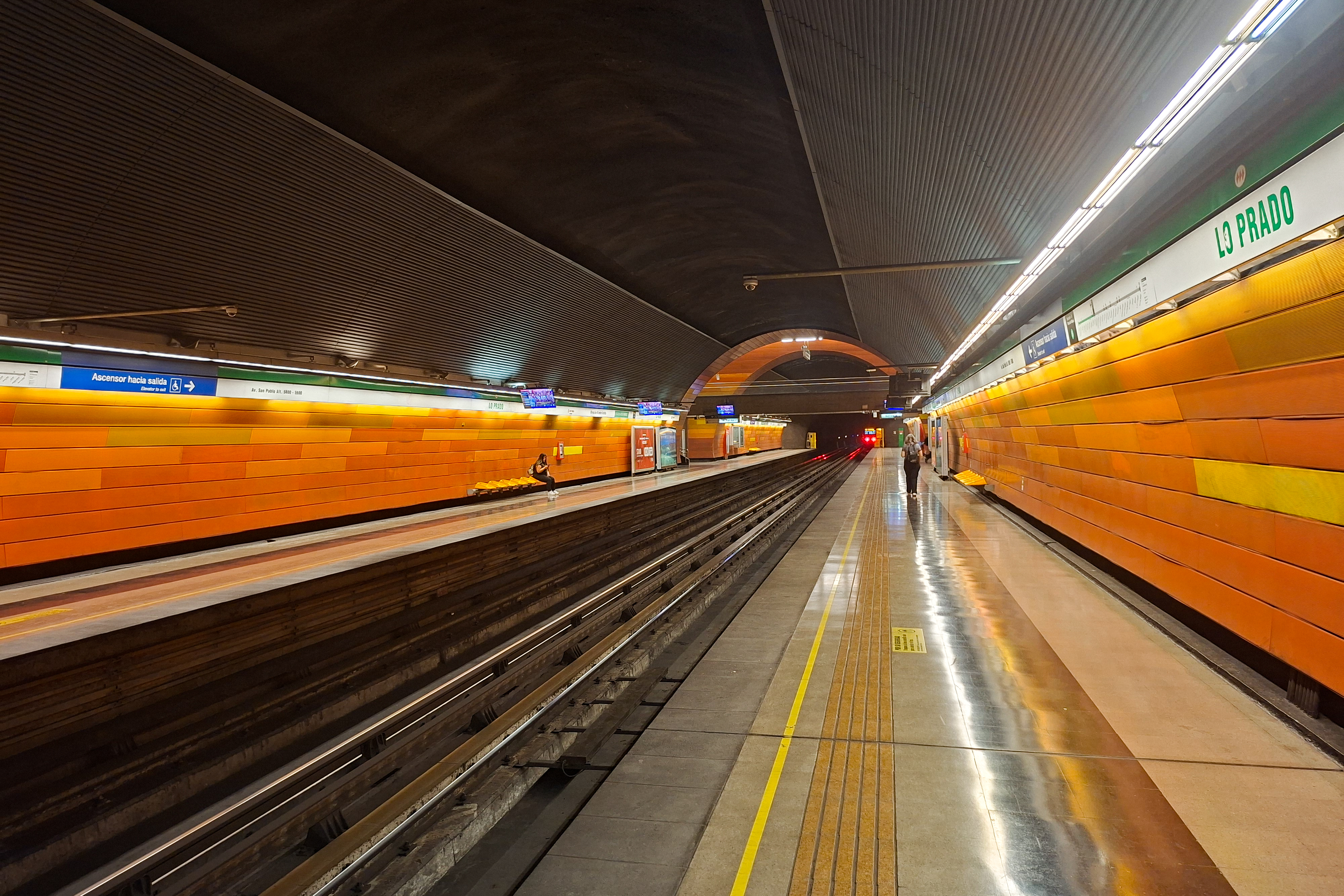

General information
- Location: San Pablo Avenue / Santa Marta Street
- Coordinates: 33°26′35.38″S 70°43′0.58″W
- System: Santiago rapid transit
- Line: Line 5
- Platforms: 2 side platforms
- Tracks: 2
- Connections: Transantiago buses

Construction
- Accessible: yes

History
- Opened: January 12, 2010

Services
Preceding station	Santiago Metro	Following station
San Pablo towards Plaza de Maipú	Line 5	Blanqueado towards Vicente Valdés
Location

Lo Prado is an underground metro station on the Line 5 of the Santiago Metro, in Santiago, Chile. The entrance to the station is located in front of the town hall of Lo Prado. The station was opened on 12 January 2010 as part of the extension of the line from Quinta Normal to Pudahuel.

The station consists of three cylindrical volumes. The platforms and tracks are in a NATM-built tunnel, which is perpendicularly intersected by a second volume. At that point, a bridge connects both platforms, which is supported at each end by the shaft structures of two elevators. The upper levels are contained within a cut-and-cover volume, which has a helical internal layout. The walls at platform level are paneled with rectangular slabs in orange tones. The length of the platforms is 135 m (443 ft).
