= Pedrero metro station =

Santiago metro station

Pedrero
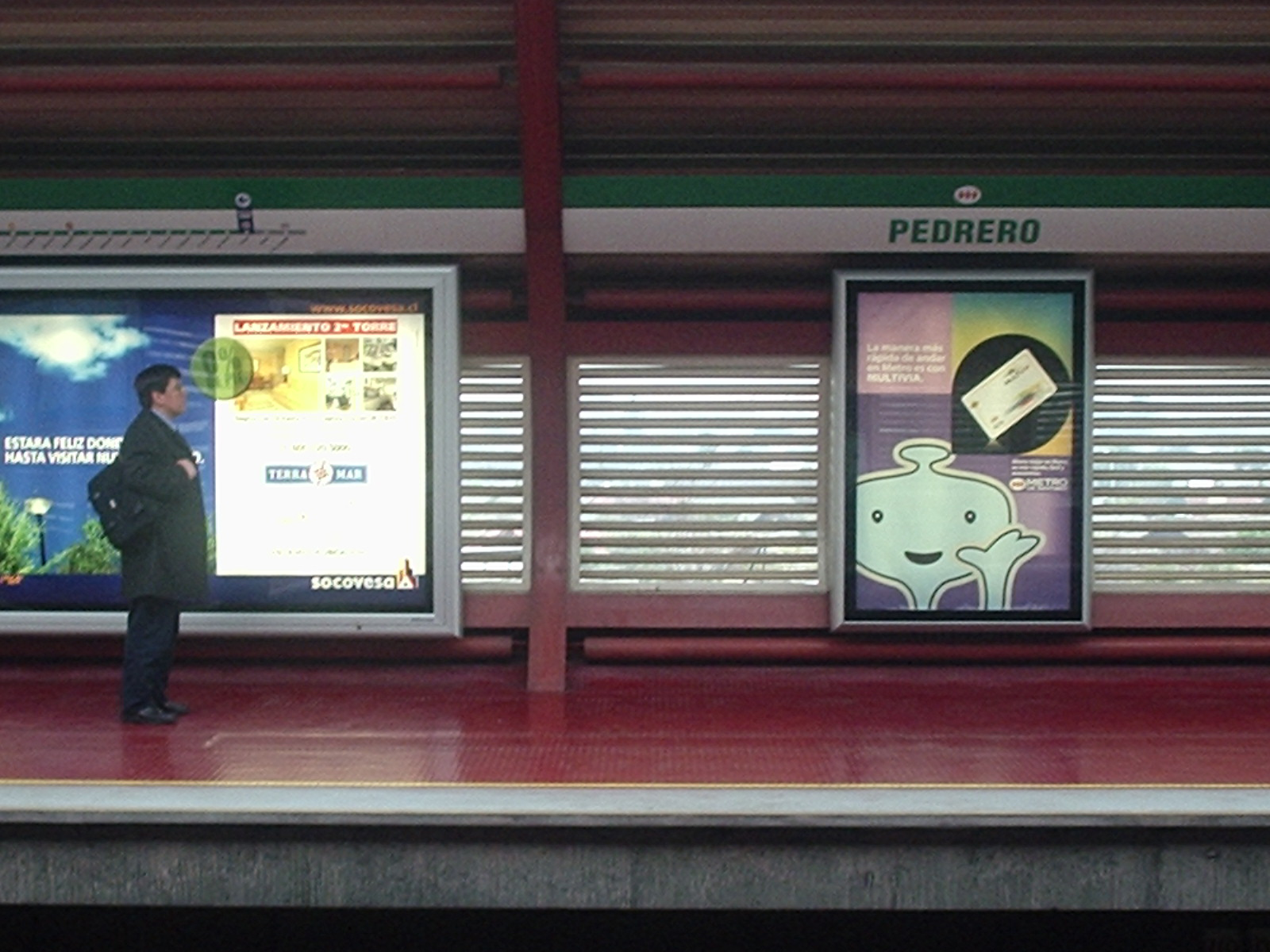

General information
- Location: Vicuña Mackenna Avenue / Departamental Avenue
- Coordinates: 33°30′28.99″S 70°36′44.53″W
- System: Santiago rapid transit
- Line: Line 5
- Platforms: 2 side platforms
- Tracks: 2
- Connections: Transantiago buses

Construction
- Accessible: yes

History
- Opened: April 5, 1997

Services
Preceding station	Santiago Metro	Following station
San Joaquín towards Plaza de Maipú	Line 5	Mirador towards Vicente Valdés
Location

Pedrero is an elevated metro station on the Line 5 of the Santiago Metro, in Santiago, Chile. It is located close to the Estadio Monumental David Arellano. The station was opened on 5 April 1997 as part of the inaugural section of the line, from Baquedano to Bellavista de La Florida.

The station was upgraded in 2012, a work which included the lengthening of platforms and the installation of a tensile membrane roof.

Old symbol with which the station was identified.
