= Mirador metro station =

Santiago metro station

Mirador
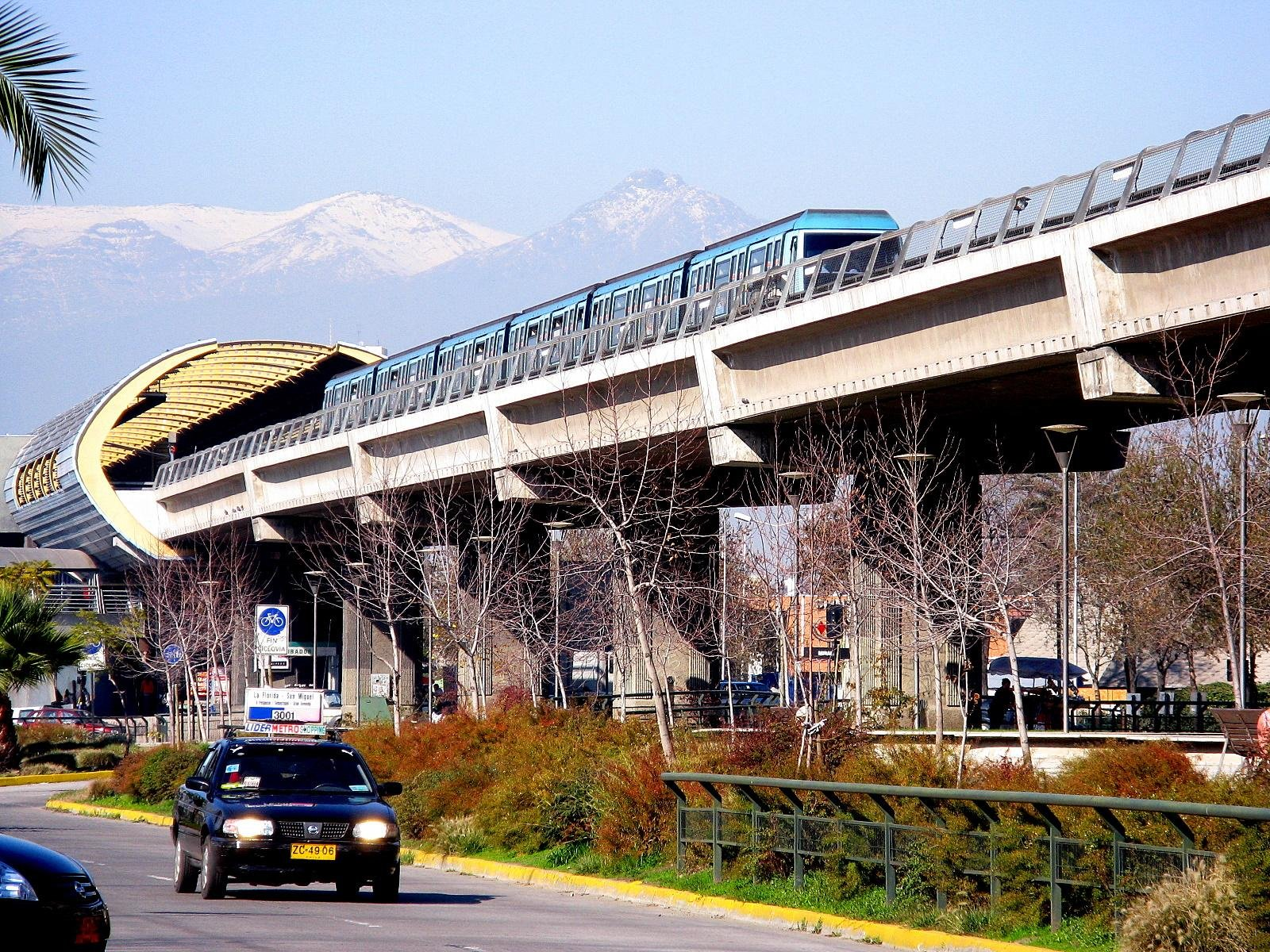

General information
- Location: Vicuña Mackenna Avenue / Mirador Azul Street
- Coordinates: 33°30′48.3″S 70°36′21.33″W
- System: Santiago rapid transit
- Line: Line 5
- Platforms: 2 side platforms
- Tracks: 2
- Connections: Transantiago buses

Construction
- Accessible: yes

History
- Opened: April 5, 1997

Services
Preceding station	Santiago Metro	Following station
Pedrero towards Plaza de Maipú	Line 5	Bellavista de La Florida towards Vicente Valdés
Location

Mirador is an elevated metro station on the Line 5 of the Santiago Metro, in Santiago, Chile. A footbridge connects the concourse level to the Mall Florida Center. The station was opened on 5 April 1997 as part of the inaugural section of the line, from Baquedano to Bellavista de La Florida.

Like the older elevated stations on the Line 5, Mirador was upgraded to support longer trains. The old side platforms were five-car long, but the renovation allows the platforms to serve seven-car trains.

Old symbol with which the station was identified.
