= Blanqueado metro station =

Santiago metro station

Blanqueado
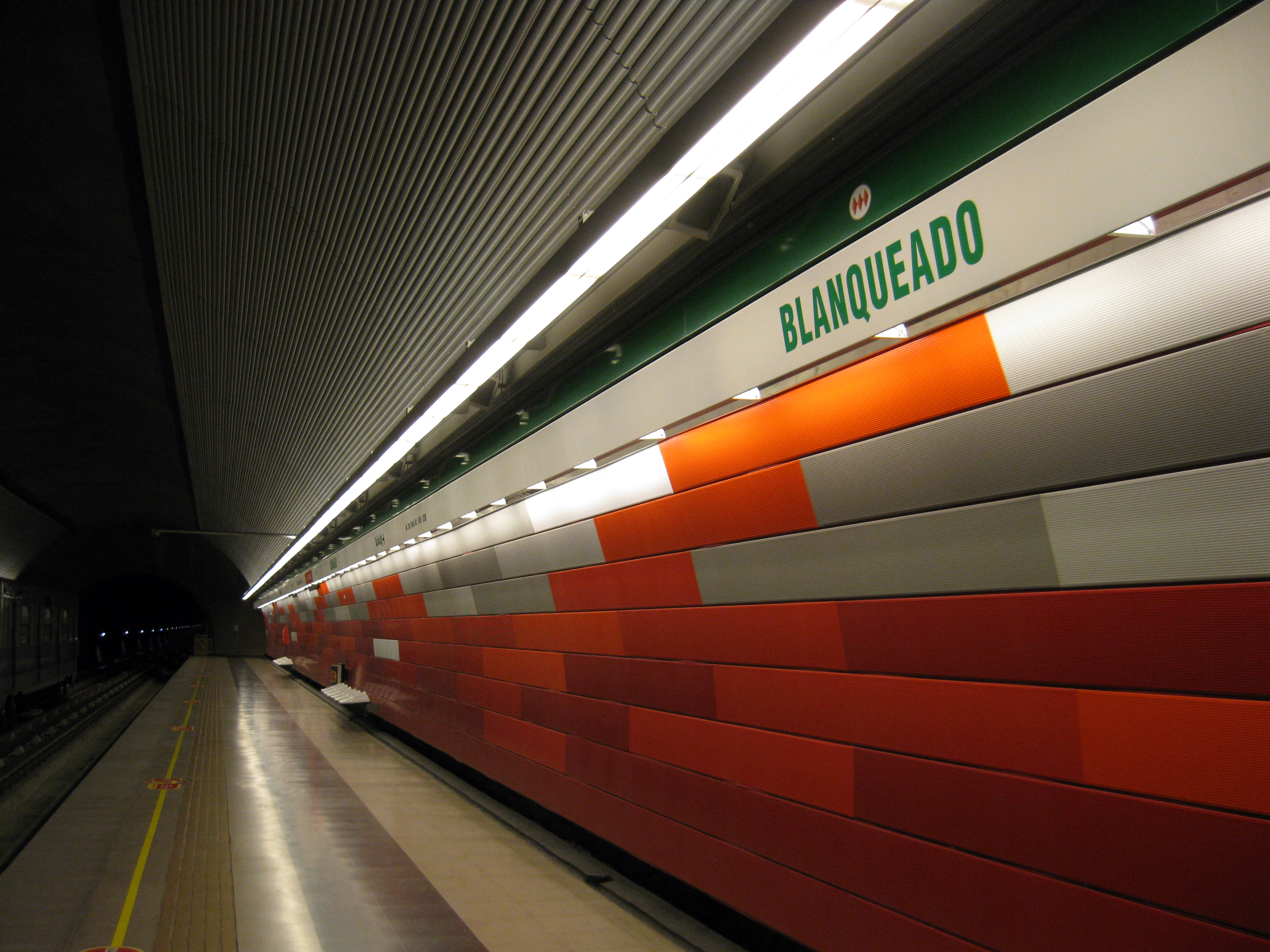

General information
- Location: San Pablo Avenue / Las Rejas Avenue
- Coordinates: 33°26′28.03″S 70°42′24.58″W
- System: Santiago rapid transit
- Line: Line 5
- Platforms: 2 side platforms
- Tracks: 2
- Connections: Transantiago buses

Construction
- Accessible: yes

History
- Opened: January 12, 2010

Services
Preceding station	Santiago Metro	Following station
Lo Prado towards Plaza de Maipú	Line 5	Gruta de Lourdes towards Vicente Valdés
Location

Blanqueado is an underground metro station on the Line 5 of the Santiago Metro, in Santiago, Chile. The station was opened on 12 January 2010 as part of the extension of the line from Quinta Normal to Pudahuel.

The tunnel containing the platforms, which are 135 metres (443 ft) long, is connected by a concourse tunnel to a large shaft, which includes the ticket hall, as well as the stairways and elevator that lead to the only exit. The tracks rest at a depth of 18.6 m (61 ft).
