= Del Sol metro station =

Santiago metro station

Del Sol
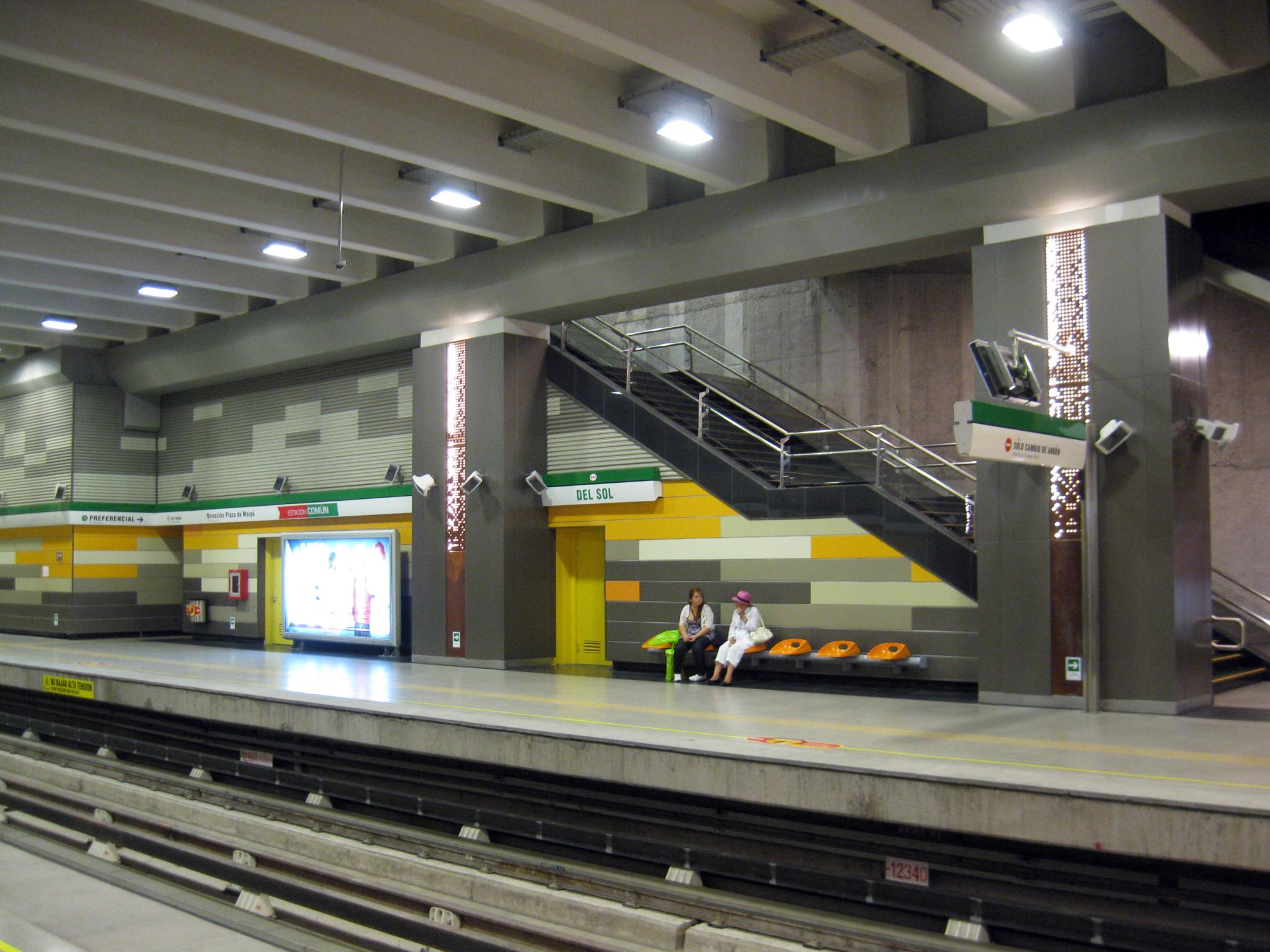
- Platform level

General information
- Location: Pajaritos Avenue / Américo Vespucio Avenue
- Coordinates: 33°29′23.97″S 70°45′10.64″W
- System: Santiago rapid transit
- Line: Line 5
- Platforms: 2 side platforms
- Tracks: 2
- Connections: Transantiago buses

Construction
- Accessible: yes

History
- Opened: February 3, 2011

Services
Preceding station	Santiago Metro	Following station
Santiago Bueras towards Plaza de Maipú	Line 5	Monte Tabor towards Vicente Valdés
Location

Del Sol is a metro station on the Line 5 of the Santiago Metro, in Santiago, Chile. The station is named for the nearby Autopista del Sol. The station was opened on 3 February 2011 as part of the extension of the line from Pudahuel to Plaza de Maipú.

At 17 metres (56 ft) below the surface, the lower level of the station has two side platforms and two tracks, and above these there is a full-length mezzanine. The platforms are 170 m (560 ft) in length. Large rectangular pillars support the upper levels. The station features a caterpillar-shaped street-level bus area, which is covered by a fiberglass-reinforced PVC fabric membrane roof. It is 120 m (390 ft) long and 25 m (82 ft) wide.
