= Gruta de Lourdes metro station =

Santiago metro station

Gruta de Lourdes
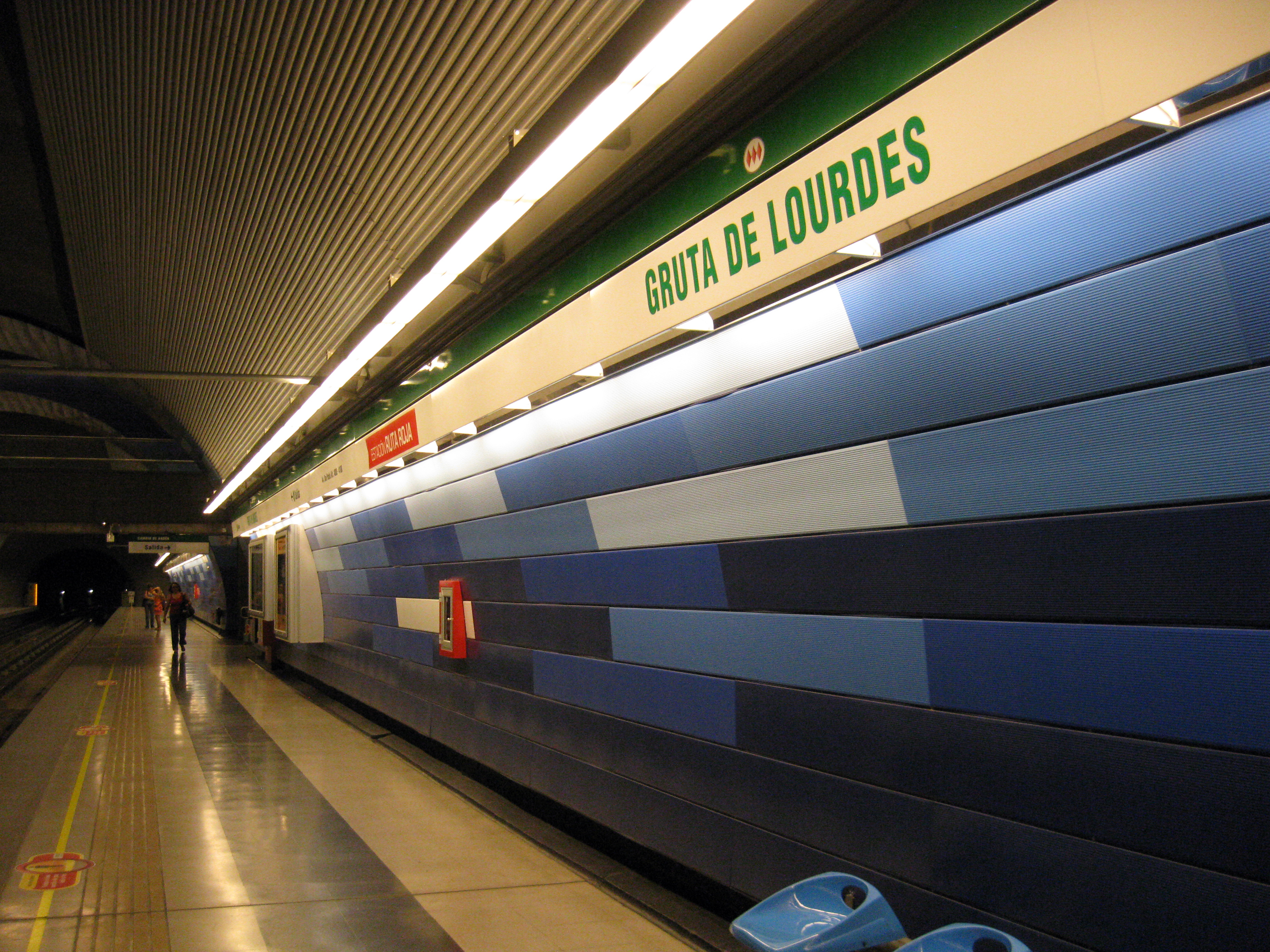

General information
- Location: San Pablo Avenue / Patria Nueva Street
- Coordinates: 33°26′17.76″S 70°41′27.43″W
- System: Santiago rapid transit
- Line: Line 5
- Platforms: 2 side platforms
- Tracks: 2
- Connections: Transantiago buses

Construction
- Accessible: yes

History
- Opened: January 12, 2010

Services
Preceding station	Santiago Metro	Following station
Blanqueado towards Plaza de Maipú	Line 5	Quinta Normal towards Vicente Valdés
Location

Gruta de Lourdes is an underground metro station on the Line 5 of the Santiago Metro, in Santiago, Chile. It is located close to the western branch of the Autopista Central and the Basilica of Lourdes. East of the station, Line 5 runs beneath Quinta Normal Park. The station was opened on 12 January 2010 as part of the extension of the line from Quinta Normal to Pudahuel.

The station features a mined train hall and transept. Both tunnels, which have an oval cross section, were excavated from a deep open pit. A street-level pavilion with glazed walls contains the fare control.

At the platform level, the walls are paneled with rectangular tiles in blue tones, which are made of pre-painted perforated aluminum. The tracks lie 24.2 metres (79 ft) below street level.
