= Monte Tabor metro station =

Santiago metro station

Monte Tabor
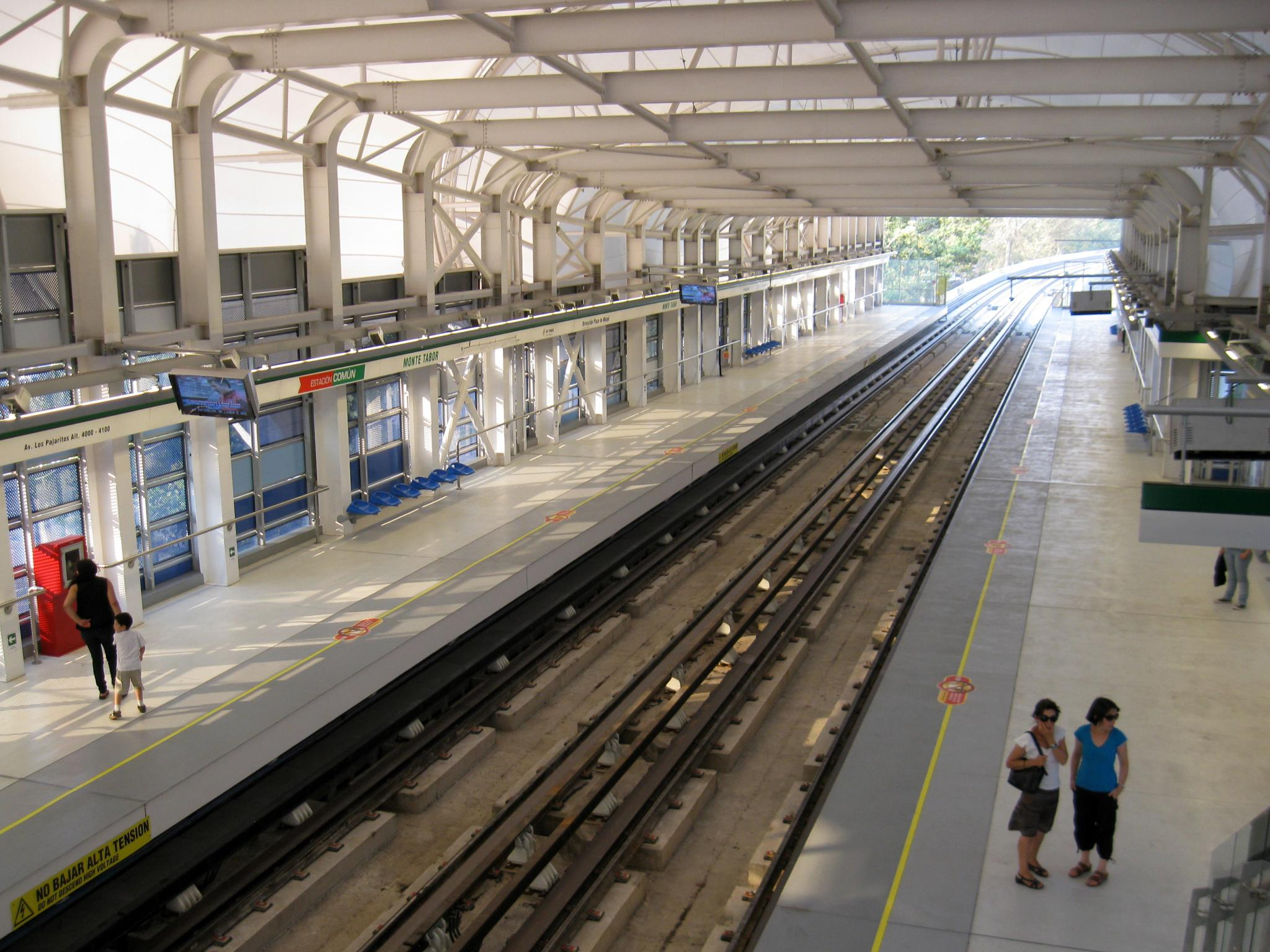

General information
- Location: Pajaritos Avenue / Monte Tabor Street
- Coordinates: 33°28′56.07″S 70°44′43.58″W
- System: Santiago rapid transit
- Line: Line 5
- Platforms: 2 side platforms
- Tracks: 2
- Connections: Transantiago buses

Construction
- Accessible: yes

History
- Opened: February 3, 2011

Services
Preceding station	Santiago Metro	Following station
Del Sol towards Plaza de Maipú	Line 5	Las Parcelas towards Vicente Valdés
Location

Monte Tabor is a metro station on the Line 5 of the Santiago Metro, in Santiago, Chile. The station was opened on 3 February 2011 as part of the extension of the line from Pudahuel to Plaza de Maipú. It is one of the three stations built on a viaduct on the just mentioned extension.

The platforms and tracks are enclosed by a steel-framed structure. The portal frames are rectangular in shape with rounded corners and have different heights, which creates an undulating pattern along the platforms lengthwise. The structure base is overlapped by an arched tensile membrane structure. This portion of the station is laterally covered with sandwich-structured composite panels of aluminum.

The station features a double decker skyway, which connects the platforms to a cylindrical building. The walkway on the lower deck leads to the westbound platform, while the higher walkway crosses over the tracks and connects with the eastbound platform via two stairways and a two-stop elevator.
