= Bellas Artes metro station (Santiago) =

Santiago metro station

Bellas Artes
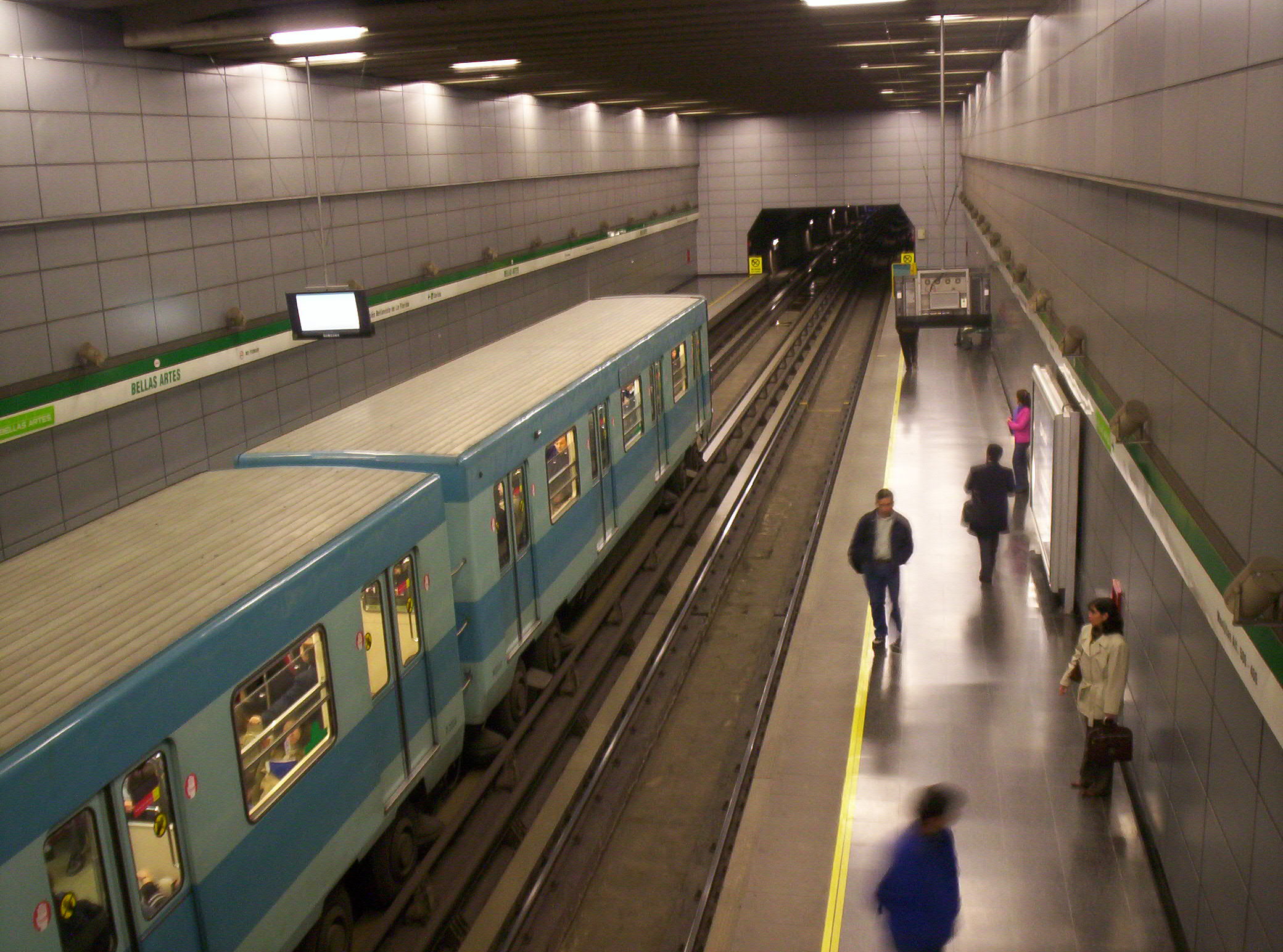

General information
- Coordinates: 33°26′11.68″S 70°38′39.88″W
- System: Santiago rapid transit
- Line: Line 5
- Platforms: 2 side platforms
- Tracks: 2
- Connections: Transantiago buses

Construction
- Accessible: yes

History
- Opened: March 2, 2000

Services
Preceding station	Santiago Metro	Following station
Plaza de Armas towards Plaza de Maipú	Line 5	Baquedano towards Vicente Valdés
Location

Bellas Artes is an underground metro station on the Line 5 of the Santiago Metro. It has platforms narrower than those of the older Santiago's metro stations and has only one exit. Chilean National Museum of Fine Arts, which is located on Parque Forestal, and Santa Lucía Hill are within walking distance from the station. The station was opened on 3 March 2000 as part of the extension of the line was extended from Baquedano to Santa Ana.

The name Bellas Artes is Spanish for Fine Arts, an allusion to the aforementioned museum.

== Transantiago buses ==
The station is surrounded by 4 bus stops (Stops 3 and 5 do not exist):

Bus Stop/ Code	Routes
Stop 1 / Miraflores - Merced (PA334)	504 (Hosp. Dipreca) - 505 (Peñalolén) - 508 (Av. Las Torres) - 517 (Peñalolén) - B02n (Plaza Italia)
Stop 2 / Metro Bellas Artes (PA395)	502c (Cerro Navia) - 504 (El Tranque) - 505 (Cerro Navia) - 508 (Av. Mapocho)
Stop 4 / Metro Bellas Artes (PA259)	307 (Lo Marcoleta) - 314 (Lo Marcoleta) - 314e (Lo Marcoleta) - 517 (J.J. Pérez) - B27 (Metro Vespucio Norte)
Stop 6 / Metro Bellas Artes (PA587)	116 (Huechuraba) - 214 (El Cortijo)
Miraflores esq. / Merced (PA44)	303 (Quilicura) - 514 (Enea) - 515n (Route end) - 515n (San Luis de Macul)
