= Santiago Bueras metro station =

Santiago metro station

Santiago Bueras
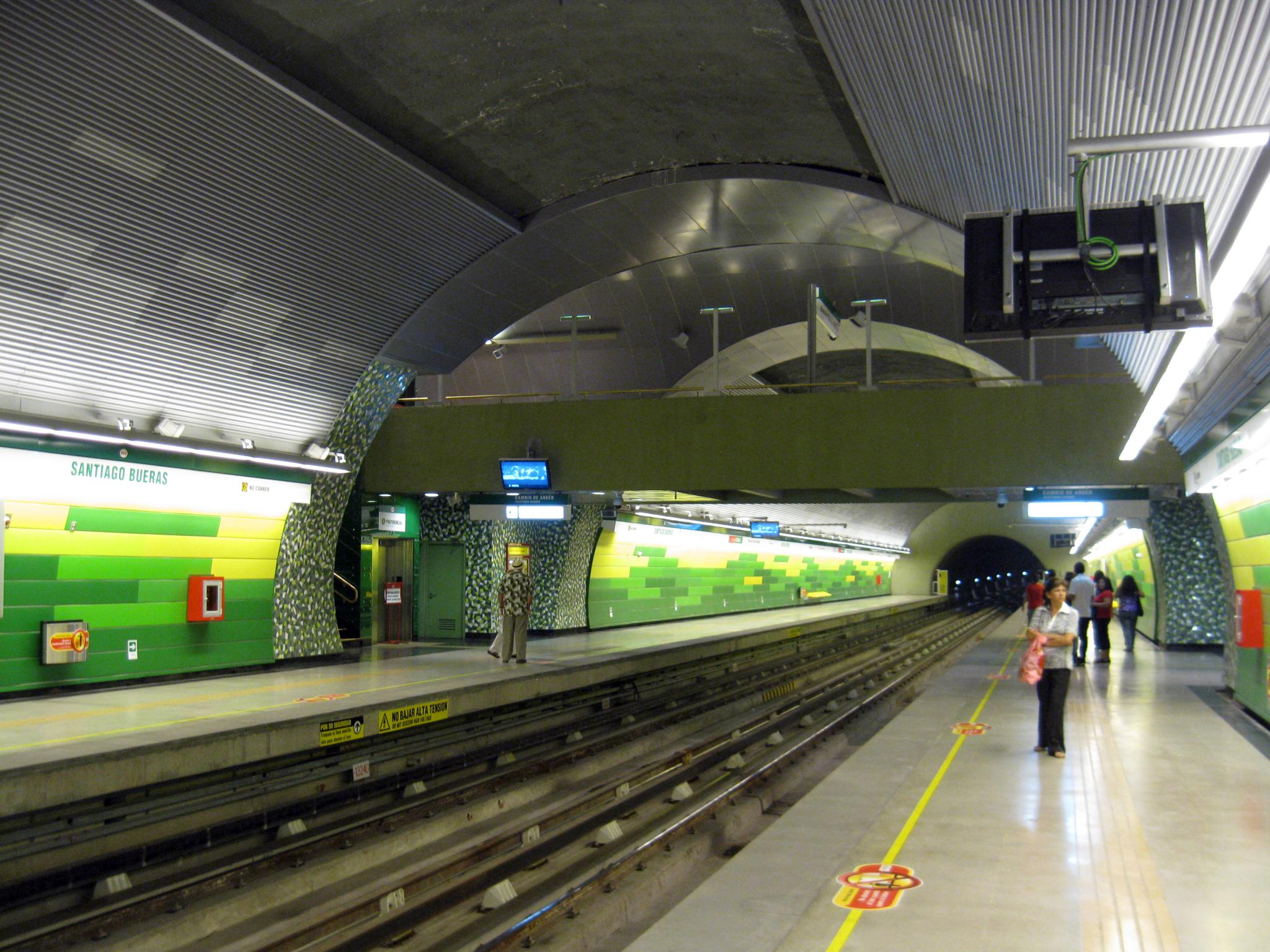

General information
- Location: Pajaritos Avenue / Rafael Riesco Street
- Coordinates: 33°29′49.11″S 70°45′25.53″W
- System: Santiago rapid transit
- Line: Line 5
- Platforms: 2 side platforms
- Tracks: 2
- Connections: Transantiago buses

Construction
- Accessible: yes

History
- Opened: February 3, 2011

Services
Preceding station	Santiago Metro	Following station
Plaza de Maipú Terminus	Line 5	Del Sol towards Vicente Valdés
Location

Santiago Bueras is an underground metro station on the Line 5 of the Santiago Metro, in Santiago, Chile. It is named after Santiago Bueras, a soldier shot dead at the Battle of Maipú. The station was opened on 3 February 2011 as part of the extension of the line from Pudahuel to Plaza de Maipú.

The station consists of a mined platform tunnel and transept, as well as a cut-and-cover shaft. There is an inverted pyramid roof over the paid area of the street-level ticket hall, which features V-shaped pillars and glazed walls.
