= Plaza de Armas metro station =

Santiago metro station

Plaza de Armas
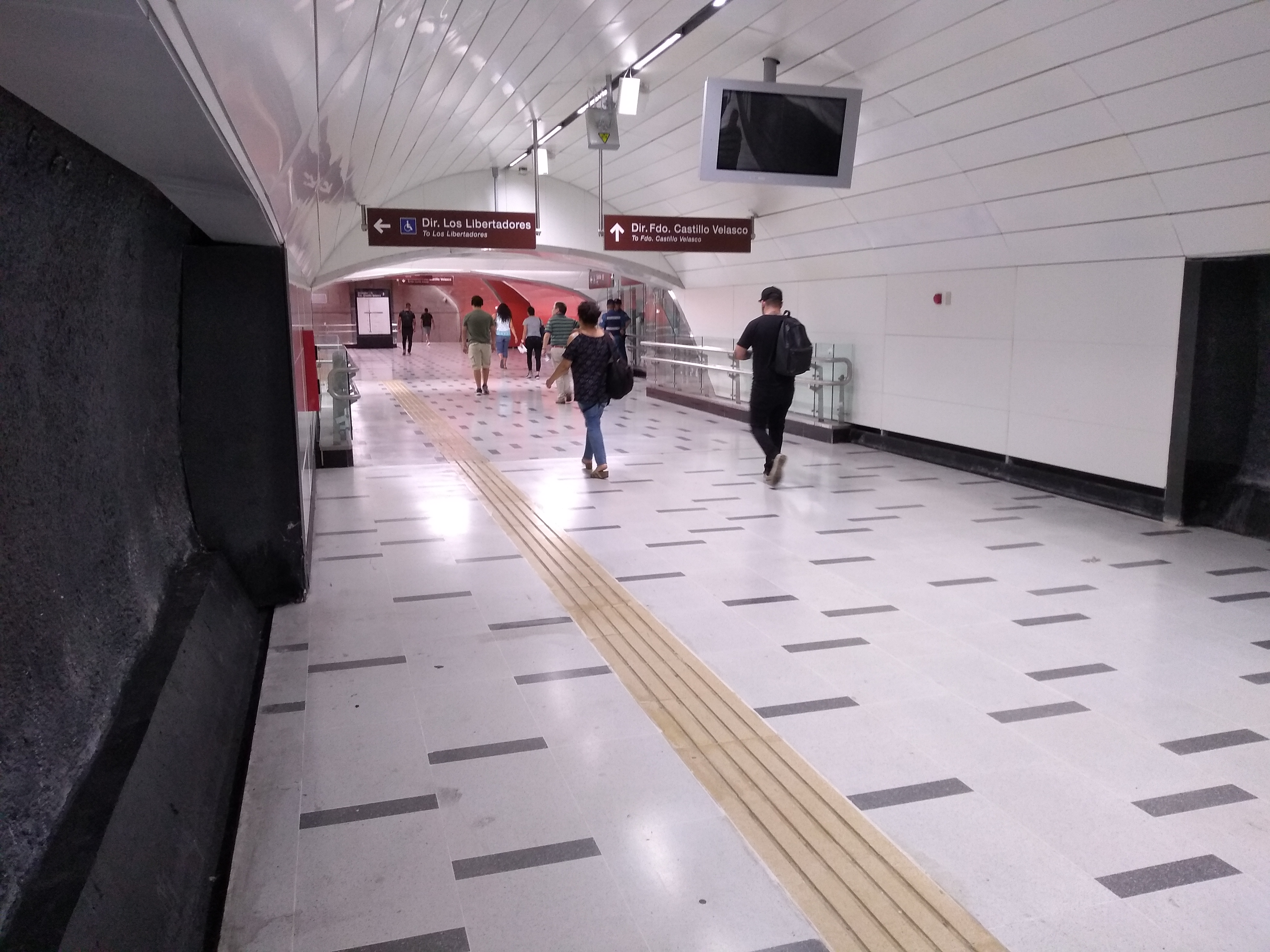
- Level of combination between lines 3 and 5.

General information
- Coordinates: 33°26′15.84″S 70°39′1.64″W
- System: Santiago rapid transit
- Lines: Line 3 Line 5
- Platforms: 2 side platforms
- Tracks: 2
- Connections: Transantiago buses

Construction
- Accessible: yes

History
- Opened: 2 March 2000; 22 January 2019

Services
Preceding station	Santiago Metro	Following station
Puente Cal y Canto towards Plaza Quilicura	Line 3	Universidad de Chile towards Fernando Castillo Velasco
Santa Ana towards Plaza de Maipú	Line 5	Bellas Artes towards Vicente Valdés
Location

Plaza de Armas is a transfer station between the Line 3 and Line 5 of the Santiago Metro. It is located under the Plaza de Armas of Santiago. The Line 5 station was opened on 3 March 2000 as part of the extension of the line from Baquedano to Santa Ana. The Line 3 station was opened on 22 January 2019 as part of the inaugural section of the line, from Los Libertadores to Fernando Castillo Velasco.

In January 2022, architects Loreto Lyon and Alejandro Beals, designers of the building over the station, were recognized as "Architects of the Year" by CityLab Santiago for their project.

Nearby points of interest include the Metropolitan Cathedral of Santiago, Central Post Office Building, Palacio de la Real Audiencia de Santiago, Santo Domingo Church and the Casa Colorada.
