= Cumming metro station =

Metro station in Santiago, Chile

Cumming
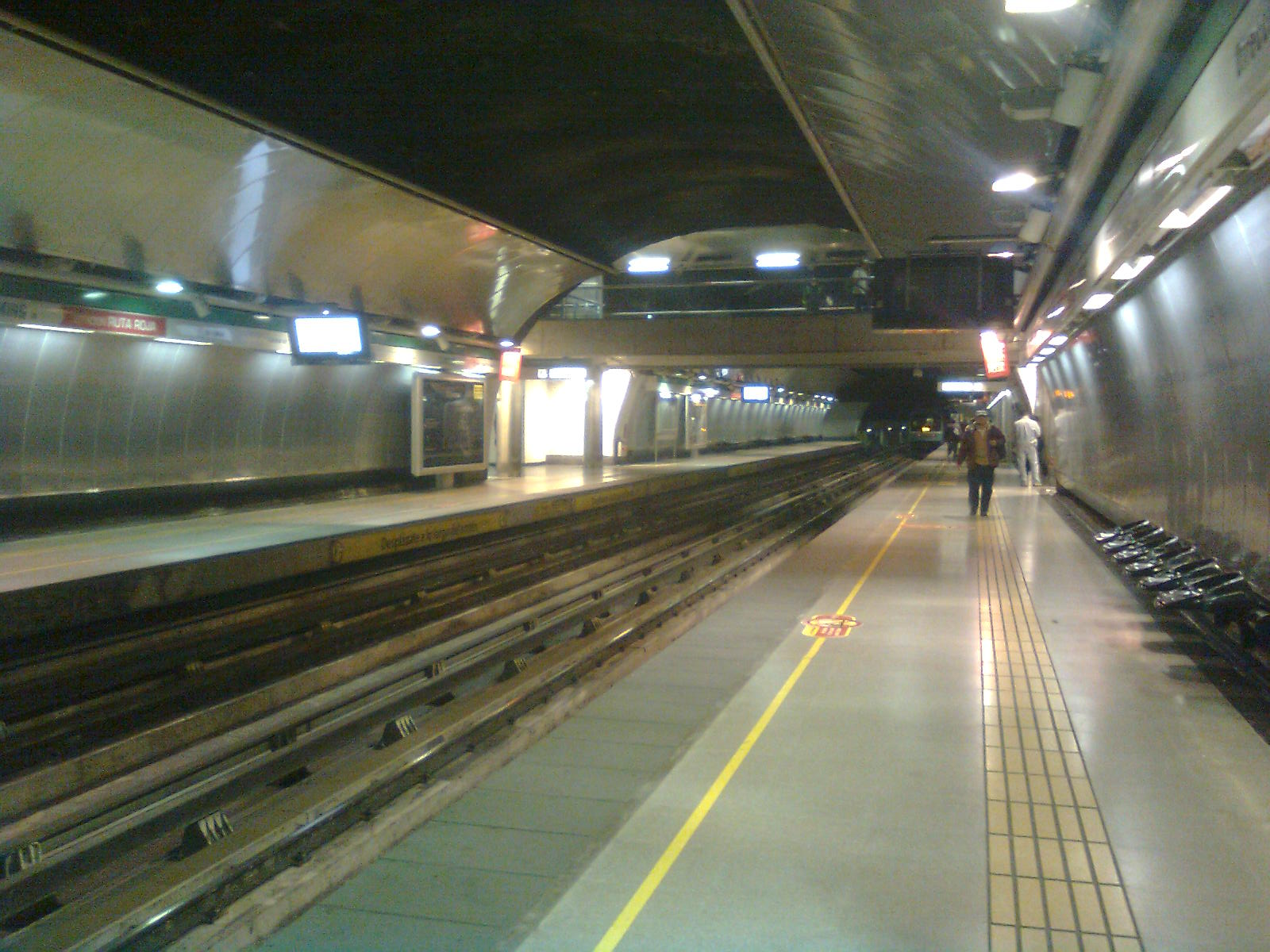

General information
- Location: Catedral Street / Ricardo Cumming Avenue
- Coordinates: 33°26′20.67″S 70°40′7.10″W
- System: Santiago rapid transit
- Line: Line 5
- Platforms: 2 side platforms
- Tracks: 2
- Connections: Transantiago buses

Construction
- Accessible: yes

History
- Opened: March 31, 2004

Services
Preceding station	Santiago Metro	Following station
Quinta Normal towards Plaza de Maipú	Line 5	Santa Ana towards Vicente Valdés
Location

Cumming is an underground metro station on the Line 5 of the Santiago Metro, in Santiago, Chile. It is located underneath Catedral street in the commune of Santiago, between metro stations Quinta Normal and Santa Ana.

The station opened on March 31, 2004, along with Quinta Normal station. A ghost station, Libertad, lies between Quinta Normal and Cumming station.

The station is located in the heart of Barrio Brasil, a lively neighborhood known for its cultural scene, near the Brasil campus of the Academy of Christian Humanism University, the Alberto Hurtado University and the Alonso de Ercilla Institute. At the entrance to the station lies the Iglesia de los Capuchinos, a church built in the Neoclassic Greco-Roman style.

The station has disability access. Shotcrete was used for primary and secondary lining of the tunnels. The walls on the platform level and the mezzanine level ceiling feature perforated aluminum panels. A glazed street-level pavilion, which features shade devices, provides access to the station.

== Etymology ==
The station is named for its location underneath the intersection of Ricardo Cumming Avenue with Catedral Street, in the heart of Barrio Brasil.

Ricardo Cumming was a merchant who confessed to planning a siege of Valparaíso with the Congress fleet during the civil war of 1891. He was shot by government forces.
