= Las Parcelas metro station =

Santiago metro station

Las Parcelas
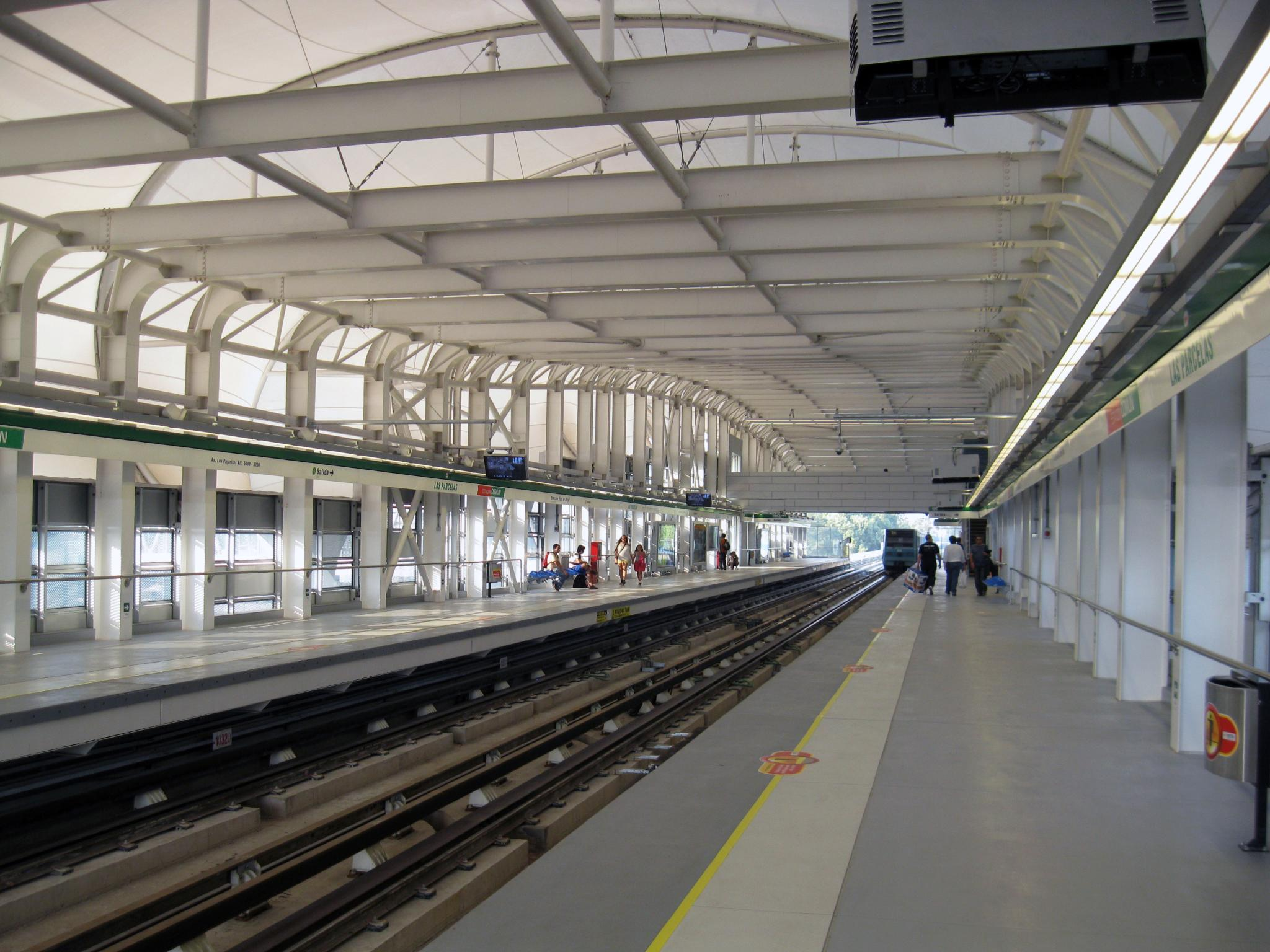
- Platforms of the station.

General information
- Location: Pajaritos Avenue / Hugo Bravo Street
- Coordinates: 33°28′30.83″S 70°44′23.88″W
- System: Santiago rapid transit
- Line: Line 5
- Platforms: 2 side platforms
- Tracks: 2
- Connections: Transantiago buses

Construction
- Accessible: yes

History
- Opened: February 3, 2011

Services
Preceding station	Santiago Metro	Following station
Monte Tabor towards Plaza de Maipú	Line 5	Laguna Sur towards Vicente Valdés
Location

Las Parcelas is a metro station on the Line 5 of the Santiago Metro, in Santiago, Chile. The station was opened on 3 February 2011 as part of the extension of the line from Pudahuel to Plaza de Maipú. It is one of the three stations built on a viaduct on the expansion.

Along with the other two elevated stops, this station features a double decker skyway, which connects the platforms to a cylindrical building. The walkway on the lower deck leads to the westbound platform, while the higher walkway crosses over the tracks and connects with the eastbound platform via two stairways and a two-stop elevator.
