= Miguel de Cervantes University =

Coordinates: 33°26′19″S 70°38′51″W

- Universidad Miguel de Cervantes
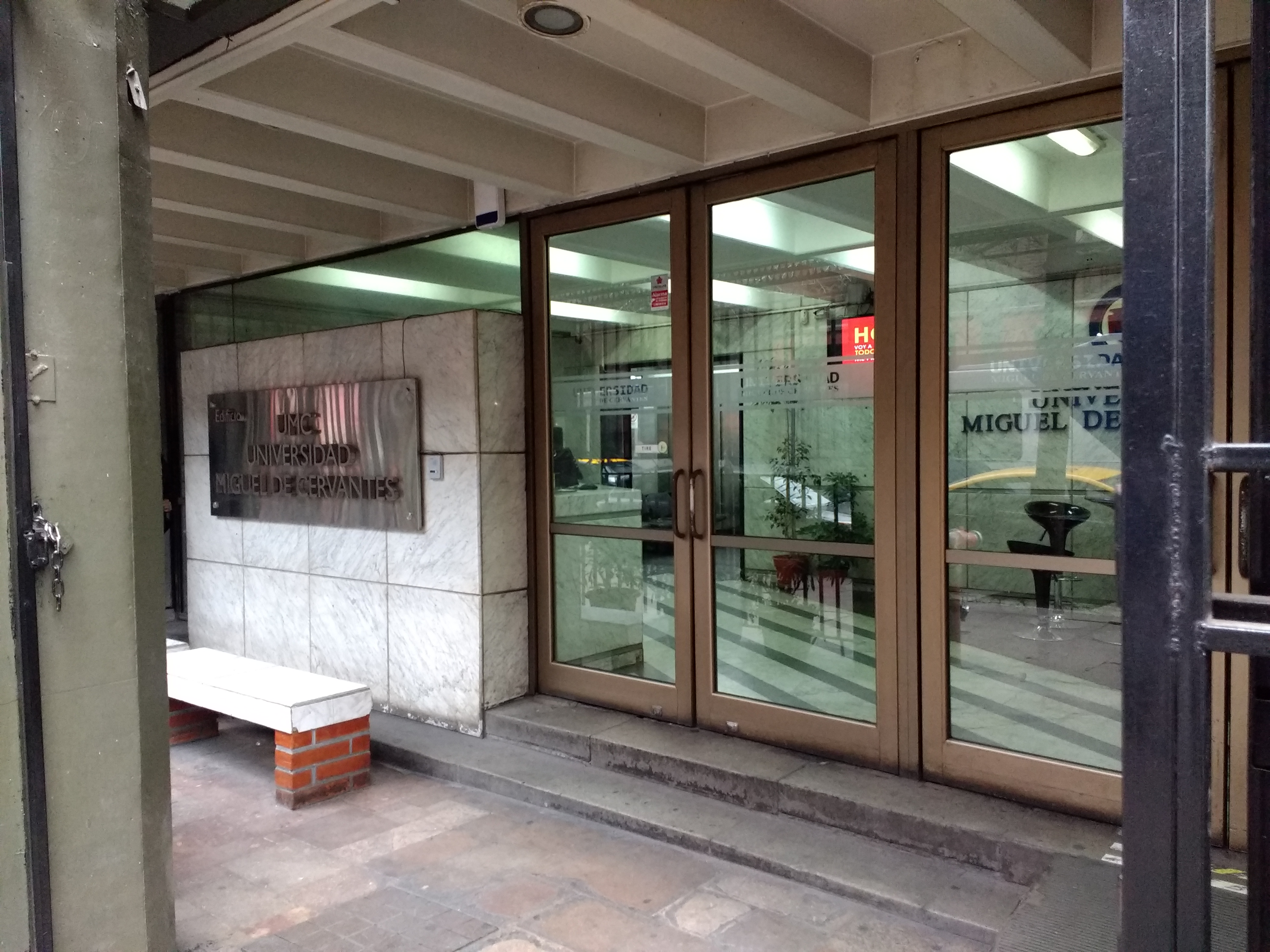
- Type: Private
- Established: 1996
- Location: Santiago, Chile
- Website: www.umcervantes.cl

Miguel de Cervantes University (Spanish: Universidad Miguel de Cervantes) is a private university located in Santiago de Chile and was established in 1996. This university had around 853 students in 2010. It is accredited by Chile's National Accreditation Commission (CNA-Chile).

Founded in 1996, it was officially recognized as a university on November 27, 1997, by Exempt Decree No. 1169 of the Ministry of Education. Its only campus is located at calle Mac Iver 370, Santiago commune near Metro stations Santa Lucia (Line 1), Bellas Artes and Plaza de Armas (Line 5). It is located within the historic center of the city.

The university became autonomous on January 15, 2009.

Miguel de Cervantes University is one of eight Chilean universities that are not accredited by the National Accreditation Commission (CNA-Chile). Moreover, it is in 56th and last place in América Economía magazine's 2012 ranking of Chilean universities. It is not mentioned in the El Mercurio 2006 ranking of universities and QS World University Rankings 2012. It is ranked 69th in Chile (15596th worldwide) in the "Webometrics Ranking of World Universities" conducted by the Cybermetrics Lab, a research group belonging to the Spain's Consejo Superior de Investigaciones Científicas

The university currently offers seven programs leading to a master's degree and three in the areas of Commercial Engineering, Social Work and Political Science. The university has 113 faculty members.
