= Santiago Metro Line 5 =

Railway

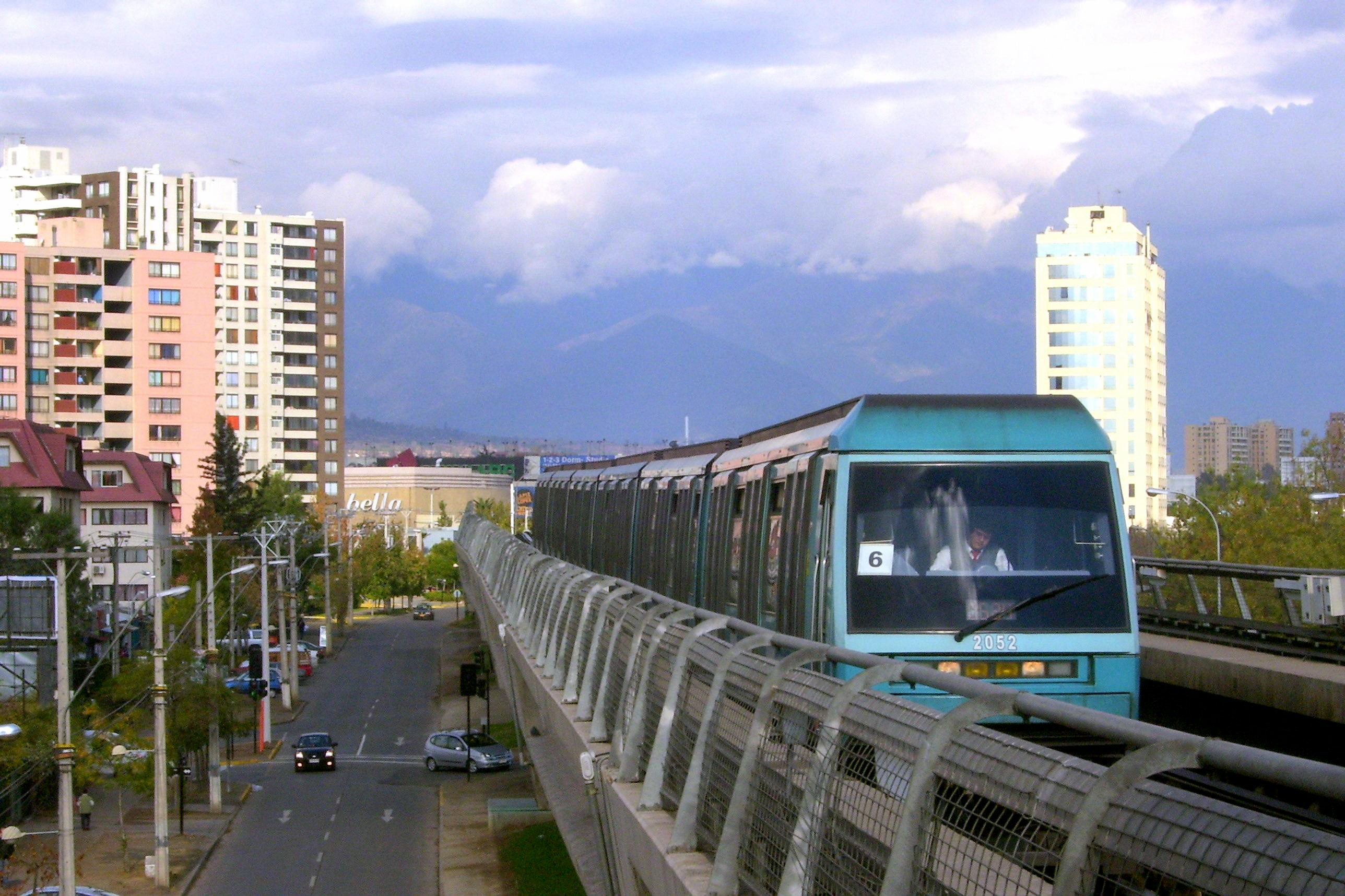

Overview
- Status: Operational
- Owner: Empresa de Transporte de Pasajeros Metro S.A.
- Locale: Santiago
- Termini: Plaza de Maipú; Vicente Valdés
- Stations: 30

Service
- Type: Rubber-tyred metro
- System: Santiago Metro, Transantiago
- Services: 1
- Operator: Empresa de Transporte de Pasajeros Metro S.A.
- Depot: Ñuble metro station
- Rolling stock: Alsthom Groupe Brissonneau NS 74, GEC-Alsthom Metropolis NS 93 and Alstom Metropolis NS 2016
- Daily ridership: 396,100 (2015)

History
- Opened: April 5, 1997; 29 years ago
- Last extension: 2011

Technical
- Line length: 29.7 km (18.5 mi)
- Number of tracks: 2
- Character: Trench-Underground-Viaduct
- Track gauge: 1,435 mm (4 ft 8 1/2 in) standard gauge
- Electrification: 750 V DC third rail (guide bars)
- Operating speed: 75 km/h (47 mph)
Route map

Santiago Metro Line 5 is one of the seven lines that currently make up the Santiago Metro network in Santiago, Chile. It has 30 stations and 29.7 km (18.5 mi) of track. The line intersects with Line 1 at Baquedano station and San Pablo station, with Line 2 at Santa Ana station, with the Line 3 at both Plaza de Armas station and Irarrázaval station, with Line 4 at Vicente Valdés station, and with line 6 at Ñuble station. It will also intersect and the future Line 7 at Baquedano station. Its distinctive colour on the network line map is green.

In 2015, Line 5 accounted for 20.8% of all trips made on the metro system with a daily ridership of 396,100.

== History ==
Line 5 was opened to the public on April 5, 1997 by President Eduardo Frei Ruiz-Tagle at Bellavista de La Florida station. It initially ran only between Bellavista de La Florida station and Baquedano station and used modern NS-93 trains imported from France. It was particularly welcomed by people living in the southern districts of Santiago and the area around Vicuña Mackenna Avenue, who saw their commute time to the centre of the city drastically reduced.

It was the first train line in Chile to make mass use of elevated viaducts in its structure, the viaduct carrying the section of track between Ñuble station and Mirador station, with the remainder running underground (However it wasn't the first line to incorporate elevated viaducts; that honor belongs to the line 2, with Parque O'Higgins metro station being the only elevated station on the aforementioned line, with an elevated viaduct running briefly to the north.)

On March 4, 2000, Line 5 was extended to the west from Baquedano station to Santa Ana station. This extension included a station at Plaza de Armas central square, allowing commuters to interchange with Line 2 (in Santa Ana), reducing travel time between the centre and the east of the city.

The line was extended again on March 31, 2004, opening Quinta Normal and Cumming stations to the public. Quinta Normal is one of the biggest on the Metro network, with space for hosting cultural events, and connects to Quinta Normal Park, where the Chilean National Museum of Natural History and a branch of the Santiago Museum of Contemporary Art are located. This station also contains an underground station planned for future commuter rail services, such as the Santiago-Batuco service and the Santiago-Valparaíso service.

On November 30, 2005, Vicente Valdés station was opened at the southern end of Line 5, serving as an interchange point with Line 4. It also provided a larger hub for the influx of people coming up from Line 4 than Bellavista de La Florida station.

On November 17, 2008, an express service began to run on Line 5 at peak times, stopping at certain stations only to allow for faster journeys.

The first section of a new extension to Pudahuel station in the east of Santiago opened on January 13, 2011, followed by the second part, to Plaza de Maipú station, in December of the same year.

On November 2, 2017, Line 6 was inaugurated, intersecting Line 5 at Ñuble station. And, on January 22 2019 Line 3 opened, intersecting with line 5 at two stations: Plaza de Armas and Irarrázaval

=== Libertad station ===
Libertad is a ghost station on Line 5 located between Quinta Normal station and Cumming station. The station was never finished and never opened, due to the low density of population living in the area or traveling through it.

=== October 2019 protests ===
In October 2019, the metro network suffered major damage to its stations because of protests. Nine stations on Line 5 suffered moderate damage (Gruta de Lourdes, Barrancas, Las Parcelas, Pedrero, Cumming, San Joaquín, Pudahuel, Laguna Sur and Del Sol); those stations had fires within the mezzanine area. Due to the lesser amount of damages on Line 5 compared to some areas of the metro network, full service on the line was expected to resume within two months of the end of the protests.

Service on Line 5 was partially restored on October 25, 2019, with express service between Quinta Normal and Vicente Valdes. As of September 7, 2020, The line is fully restored.

=== NS-16 cars ===
On November 9, 2020. NS-16 cars began operations on this line, which will replace NS74 cars. These trains are close to the standard of Line 3 and Line 6's trains, but without the driverless technology.

== Tren Expreso (Express Service) ==

The skip-stop express service works during peak hours and allows trains to stop at alternate stations, reducing the number of stops and the duration of journeys. The stations on the line are divided into “green route” stations, “red route” stations and “common” stations (Spanish: estación común), where all trains stop and allow passengers to switch between red and green routes. The express service works from Monday to Friday, between 6am - 9am and 6pm - 9pm.

=== Red Route Stations ===
- Santiago Bueras
- Monte Tabor
- Barrancas
- Blanqueado
- Quinta Normal
- Parque Bustamante
- Rodrigo de Araya
- Camino Agrícola
- Mirador

=== Green Route Stations ===
- Del Sol
- Las Parcelas
- Lo Prado
- Gruta de Lourdes
- Cumming
- Santa Isabel
- Carlos Valdovinos
- Pedrero

=== Common Stations ===
There are 13 stations where both red and green route trains stop. They are the busiest stations and give commuters the chance to change between routes.

- Plaza de Maipú
- Laguna Sur
- Pudahuel
- San Pablo
- Santa Ana
- Plaza de Armas
- Bellas Artes
- Baquedano
- Irarrázaval
- Ñuble
- San Joaquín
- Bellavista de La Florida
- Vicente Valdés

== Stations ==
Line 5 stations from west to east are:

Stations	Transfers	Location	Opening	Commune	Note
Plaza de Maipú		Av. Pajaritos/Av. 5 de Abril	February 3, 2011	Maipú	
Santiago Bueras		Av. Pajaritos/Rafael Riesco Bernales	February 3, 2011	Maipú	
Del Sol		Av. Pajaritos/Juan José Rivera	February 3, 2011	Maipú	
Monte Tabor		Av. Pajaritos/Monte Tabor	February 3, 2011	Maipú	
Las Parcelas		Av. Pajaritos/Arq. Hugo Bravo S.	February 3, 2011	Maipú	
Laguna Sur		Av. Teniente Cruz/Av. Laguna Sur	February 3, 2011	Pudahuel	
Barrancas station		Av. Teniente Cruz/Av. Gral. Oscar Bonilla	February 3, 2011	Pudahuel	
Pudahuel		Av. San Pablo/Av. Teniente Cruz	January 12, 2010	Pudahuel	
San Pablo		Av. San Pablo/Av. Neptuno	January 12, 2010	Lo Prado	
Lo Prado		Av. San Pablo/Santa Olga	January 12, 2010	Lo Prado	
Blanqueado		Av. San Pablo/Av. Sergio Valdovinos	January 12, 2010	Quinta Normal	
Gruta de Lourdes		Av. San Pablo/Av. General Velasquez	January 12, 2010	Quinta Normal	
Quinta Normal		Catedral/Matucana	March 31, 2004	Quinta Normal	
Cumming		Catedral/Av. Ricardo Cumming	March 31, 2004	Santiago	
Santa Ana		Catedral/San Martín	March 2, 2000	Santiago	
Plaza de Armas		Catedral/Paseo Ahumada	March 2, 2000	Santiago	
Bellas Artes		Monjitas/Mosqueto	March 2, 2000	Santiago	
Baquedano		Av. General Bustamante/Av. Providencia	April 5, 1997	Providencia	This station will be future combination with the line in 2028
Parque Bustamante		Av. General Bustamante/Av. Francisco Bilbao	April 5, 1997	Providencia	
Santa Isabel		Av. General Bustamante/Santa Isabel	April 5, 1997	Providencia	
Irarrázaval		Av. General Bustamante/Av. Irarrázaval	April 5, 1997	Ñuñoa	
Ñuble		Av. Carlos Dittborn/San Eugenio	April 5, 1997	Ñuñoa	
Rodrigo de Araya		Av. Vicuña Mackenna/Av. Rodrigo de Araya	April 5, 1997	San Joaquin	
Carlos Valdovinos		Av. Vicuña Mackenna/Av. Quilín	April 5, 1997	San Joaquin	
Camino Agrícola		Av. Vicuña Mackenna/Escuela Agrícola	April 5, 1997	San Joaquin/Macul	
San Joaquín		Av. Vicuña Mackenna/Raquel	April 5, 1997	San Joaquin	
Pedrero		Av. Vicuña Mackenna/Av. Departamental	April 5, 1997	San Joaquin, La Florida/Macul	
Mirador		Av. Vicuña Mackenna/Mirador Azul	April 5, 1997	La Florida	
Bellavista de La Florida		Av. Vicuña Mackenna/ El Cabildo	April 5, 1997	La Florida	
Vicente Valdés		Av. Vicuña Mackenna/Vicente Valdés	November 30, 2005	La Florida	

== Line 5 data sheet ==
- Communes:
  - Maipú
  - Pudahuel
  - Lo Prado
  - Quinta Normal
  - Santiago
  - Providencia
  - Ñuñoa
  - Macul
  - San Joaquín
  - La Florida
- Track:
  - Vicuña Mackenna Avenue: 9 stations
  - General Bustamante Avenue: 4 stations
  - Monjitas Street: 1 station
  - Catedral Street: 4 stations
  - San Pablo Road: 5 stations
  - Teniente Cruz Avenue: 2 stations
  - Los Pajaritos Avenue: 5 stations
- Construction Method:
  - Plaza de Maipú station - Del Sol station: Underground
  - Monte Tabor station - Laguna Sur station: Viaduct
  - Barrancas station - Irarrázaval: Underground
  - Ñuble station - Mirador station: Viaduct
  - Bellavista de La Florida station - Vicente Valdés station: Underground
- Opening Dates:
  - Bellavista de La Florida metro station – Baquedano: April 1997
  - Baquedano station – Santa Ana station: March 2000
  - Santa Ana station – Quinta Normal station: March 2004
  - Vicente Valdés metro station – Bellavista de La Florida metro station: November 2005
  - Quinta Normal metro station – Pudahuel station: January 2010
  - Pudahuel station – Plaza de Maipú station: February 2011

== See also ==
- List of metro systems
- Rail transport in Chile
- Red Metropolitana de Movilidad
- Rubber-tyred metro
