= NS 93 =

Santiago Metro train

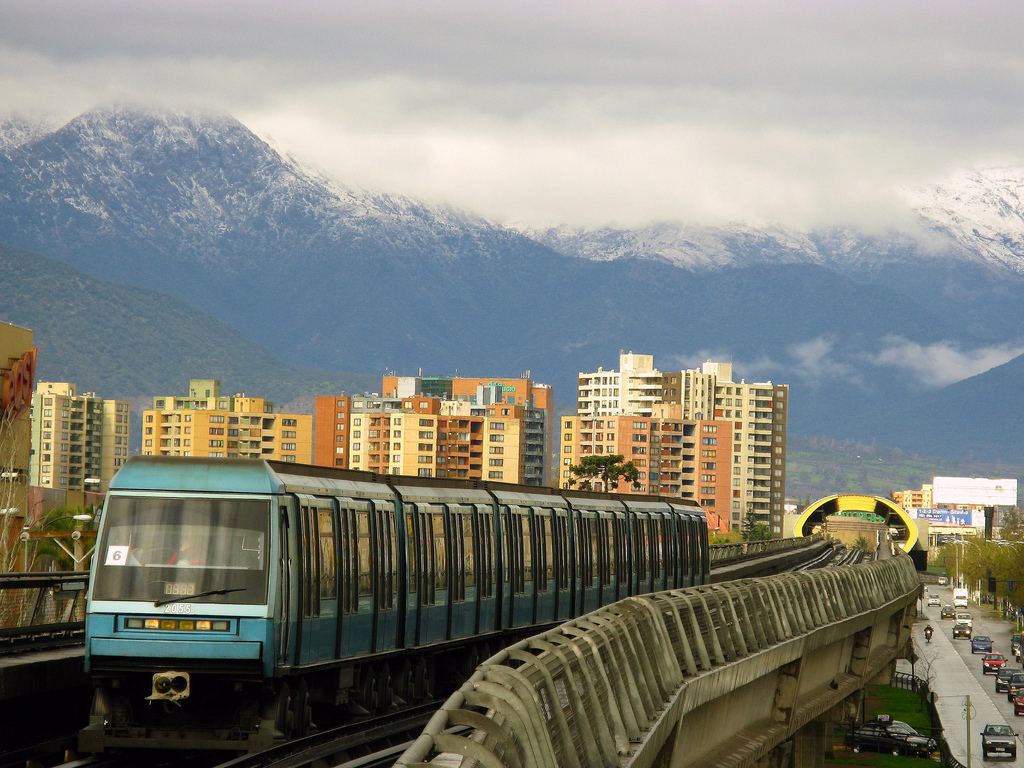
- NS 93 approaching Pedrero on Line 5
- In service: 1997–present
- Manufacturer: GEC Alsthom
- Constructed: 1996–2003
- Number built: 34 (2 out of service)
- Formation: 6 cars (Line 5); 7 cars (Line 5); 8 cars (Line 1)
- Capacity: 6 cars: 1145 passengers 7 cars: 1315 passengers 8 cars: 1400 passengers
- Operator: Metro S.A. (Santiago Metro)
- Lines served: and

Specifications
- Maximum speed: 100 km/h (62 mph)
- Traction system: GTO–VVVF
- Power output: 2,800 kW (3,800 hp)
- Electric system: 750 V DC Guide bars on either side of the track
- Current collection: Horizontal contact shoe A vertical contact shoe sliding on the rails provides grounding.
- Track gauge: 1,435 mm (4 ft 8 1/2 in) standard gauge, rubber tired wheels running on roll ways outside of the steel wheels.

The NS 93 (Neumático Santiago 1993) is the third generation of rubber tired rolling stock used on the Santiago Metro system. The trains were manufactured by GEC Alsthom in 1996 and went into operation in 1997. Originally designed for use on Line 5, the trains first operated on Line 2 prior to the opening of Line 5, and today work on the lines 1 and 5.

== Features ==
The NS 93 series is based on the design of MP 89 series from the Paris Métro, along with sloped ends, automatic doors and through gangways from car to car. However, the NS 93 is slightly taller than the MP 89 to accommodate air conditioning, and they operate in 6 or 7 car formations on Line 5 (S-N-NP-N-N-S or S-N-NP-N-R-N-S) and 8 car formations on Line 1 (S-N-N-NP-N-R-N-S). As a result, the trains can operate in six-car 90-meter (295 ft 3 in), seven-car 105-meter (344 ft 6 in), and eight-car 120-meter (393 ft 8 in) lengths, depending which line they are assigned to. The length of each car is 14.88 meters (48 ft 10 in) (15.38 meters or 50 ft 6 in for cars containing the driver's cab).

The interior of the NS 93 has a cream white scheme with orange plastic seating. Each trainset is also equipped with a train speed surveillance system (SACEM), which the MP 89 does not have. In 2010, automated station announcements were added to all trains. Since 2016 some trains are equipped with CBTC for better frequency in Line 1.

== Other Specifications ==
- Tread safety wheels: 1,435 mm (4 ft 8 1/2 in)
- Drive System: Four three-phase asynchronous AC motors (1 motor per bogie)
- Engine power: 2.400 kW (3.218 hp)
- Acceleration: 1.25 m/s^{2} (4.1 ft/s^{2})
- Year of manufacture: From 1996 (N2051) until 2003 (N2084)

== Incidents ==
On February 7, 2012, a train entering Lo Ovalle depot derailed near a condominium complex and playground. The train was not in service at the time and was only operating in testing mode following repair work. No injuries were reported, but the train and surrounding property, including four vehicles, suffered substantial damage.

On September 11, 2015, a NS-93 was burned on Line 1 at Manquehue Station. No people were injured.

On May 17, 2022, an electrical failure from a NS-93 produced an electric arc and burst on Line 1 at Las Rejas Station, where two people were injured. 3 years later the damaged train was repaired and sent back to passenger service in Line 1.
