= Santa Ana metro station =

Santiago metro station

Santa Ana
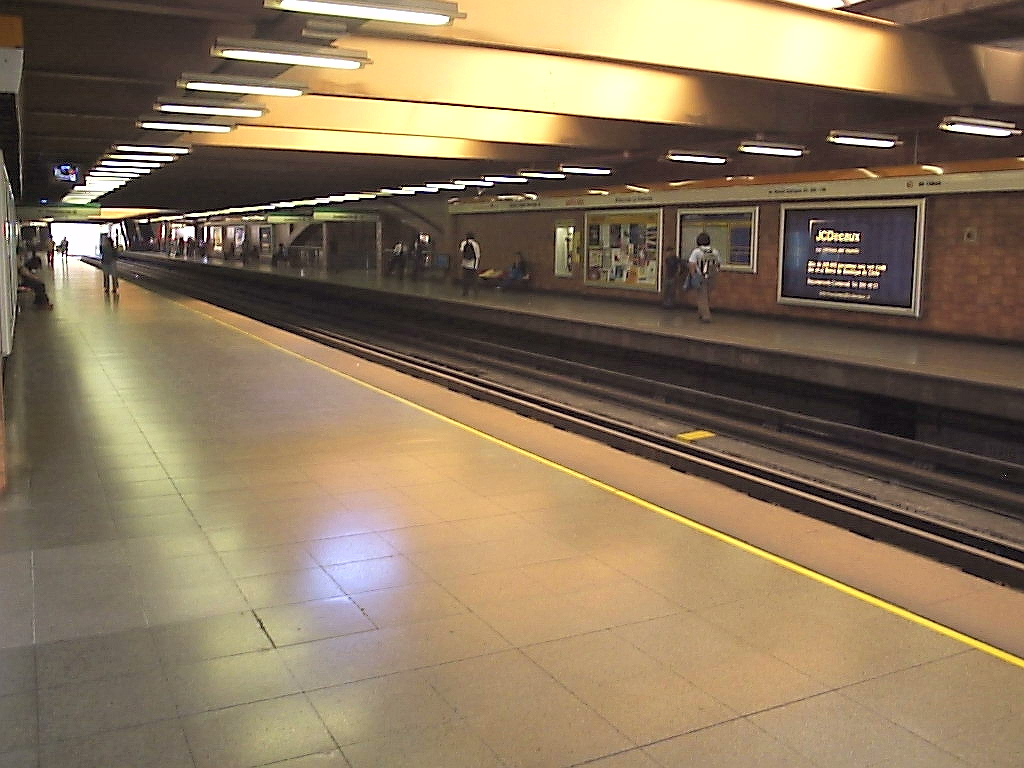
- Santa Ana station on the Line 2.

General information
- Coordinates: 33°26′17″S 70°39′36″W
- System: Santiago rapid transit
- Lines: Line 2 Line 5
- Platforms: 2 side platforms at each line
- Tracks: 2 per line
- Connections: Transantiago buses

Construction
- Accessible: yes

History
- Opened: July 25, 1986; March 2, 2000

Services
Preceding station	Santiago Metro	Following station
Puente Cal y Canto towards Vespucio Norte	Line 2	Los Héroes towards Hospital El Pino
Cumming towards Plaza de Maipú	Line 5	Plaza de Armas towards Vicente Valdés
Location

Santa Ana is a transfer station between Line 2 and Line 5 of the Santiago Metro. It was initially a single-line station on Line 2, opened on 25 July 1986 as part of the extension of the line from Los Héroes to Puente Cal y Canto. Subsequently in 1998, the station began to be adapted to become a transfer station, as a part of the extension of Line 5 from Baquedano metro station to Santa Ana station, in which the New Austrian Tunnelling method was used. The Line 5 station was opened on 3 March 2000. The line was extended to Quinta Normal on 31 March 2004.

The older portion of the station occupies part of the central reservation of the Autopista Central, which is sunken. Two street-level mezzanines at the northern and southern extremes of the station are connected with bridges traversing the highway.

The station receives its name from the nearby Santa Ana Church.
