= Autopista del Sol =

Autopista del Sol may refer to:

- Autopista del Sol (Chile), a road in Santiago, Chile
- Mexican Federal Highway 95D, known as Autopista del Sol from Cuernavaca to Acapulco
