= Iglesia de Santa Ana (Santiago de Chile) =

National monument of Chile

Coordinates: 33°26′16″S 70°39′31″W

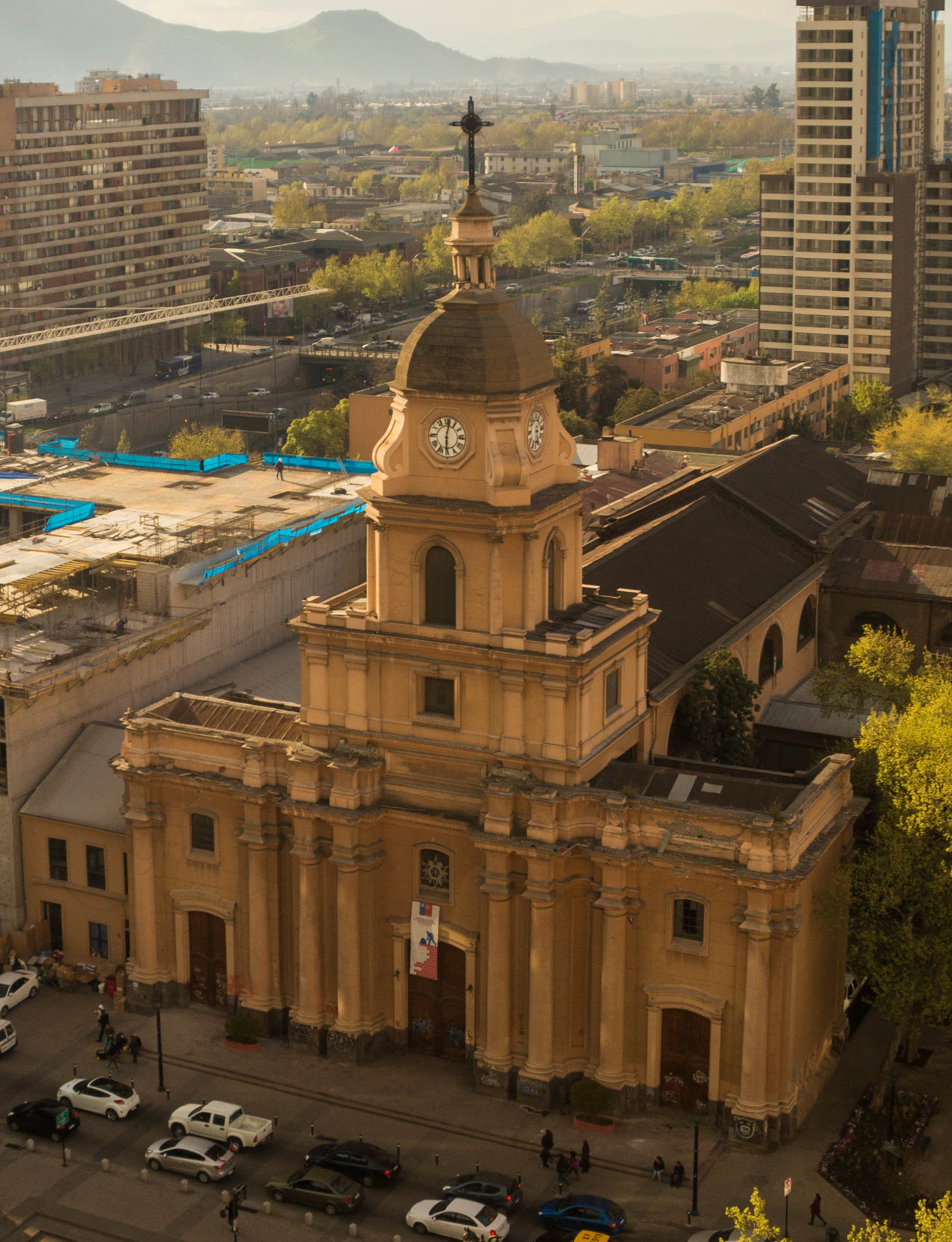

Religion
- Affiliation: Catholic

Location
- Location: Santiago
- Country: Chile
- Interactive map of Iglesia de Santa Ana

The Iglesia de Santa Ana is a Catholic church in downtown Santiago de Chile. It is located at the northwest corner of Catedral and San Martín streets. The church was declared as a National Monument of Chile in 1970, within the category of Historic Monuments. Santa Ana metro station is named after the church.

== History ==
The first church was built in 1586. The 1647 Santiago earthquake destroyed that church and the 1730 Valparaíso earthquake destroyed the rebuilt church. The present structure began to be built in 1806 after the demolition of the third church building. Its construction lasted several decades and was inaugurated in 1854 despite being unfinished.

== Architecture ==
The church was designed with a Latin cross plan. The front facade features eight Doric columns. A three-stage tower rises from the southernmost ridge line, which runs parallel the front facade.
