= Quinta Normal metro station =

Santiago metro station

Quinta Normal
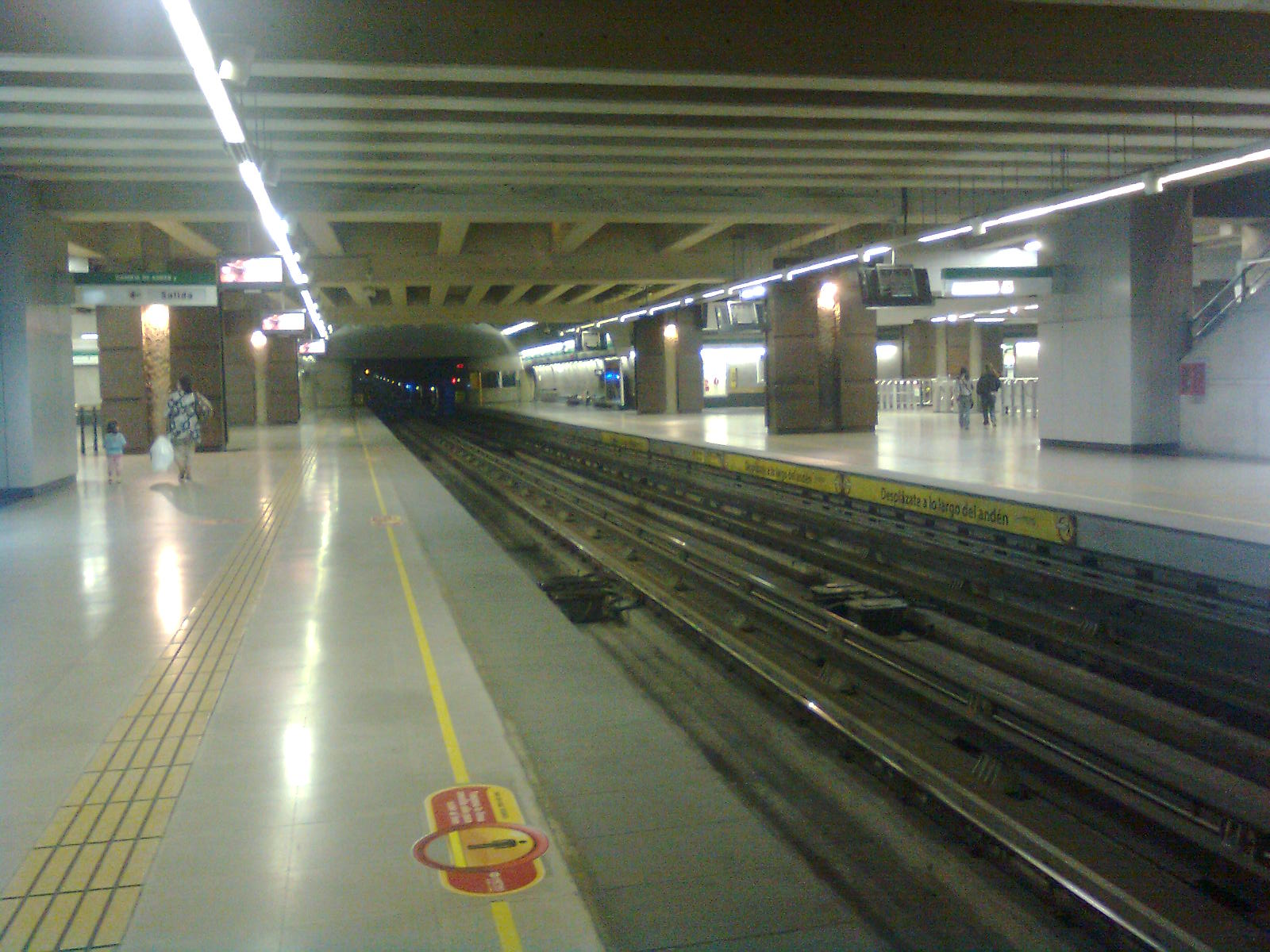

General information
- Location: Catedral Street / Matucana Avenue
- Coordinates: 33°26′25.42″S 70°40′49.12″W
- System: Santiago rapid transit
- Line: Line 5
- Platforms: 2 side platforms
- Tracks: 2
- Connections: Transantiago buses

Construction
- Accessible: yes

History
- Opened: March 31, 2004

Services
Preceding station	Santiago Metro	Following station
Gruta de Lourdes towards Plaza de Maipú	Line 5	Cumming towards Vicente Valdés
Location

Quinta Normal is an underground metro station on the Line 5 of the Santiago Metro. It is one of the largest metro stations in Santiago, Chile and provides access to Quinta Normal Park and Museum of Memory and Human Rights. Two glazed street-level entrances provide natural lighting for a portion of the station.

The station was opened on 31 March 2004 as the western terminus of the extension of the line from Santa Ana. On 12 January 2010, the line was extended further to Pudahuel.
