= Autopista San Antonio-Santiago =

Autopista San Antonio-Santiago (formerly known as Autopista del Sol) is a toll highway that runs from Santiago, Santiago Metropolitan Region to San Antonio, Valparaíso Region, in central Chile. Its total length in Santiago Metropolitan Region is 85 km (53 mi).

== Route description ==
Autopista del Sol begins at an intermediate point between the two branches of the Autopista Central, as a westward continuation of Isabel Riquelme Avenue. It meets Vespucio Norte Express close to the metro station that bears its name. For its first kilometers, the highway runs through the urban area of Santiago.

Once out of Santiago city limits, the highway continues southwesterly through Peñaflor, Talagante, and El Monte. The highway passes close to Pomaire before reaching the city of Melipilla. It then runs west and crosses the Sepultura Pass, which straddles the border between Santiago Metropolitan Region and Valparaíso Region.

After running for 104.6 km (65.0 mi), the main section of the highway terminates at an interchange with Route G-94-F.
