= Bellavista de La Florida metro station =

Santiago metro station

Bellavista de La Florida
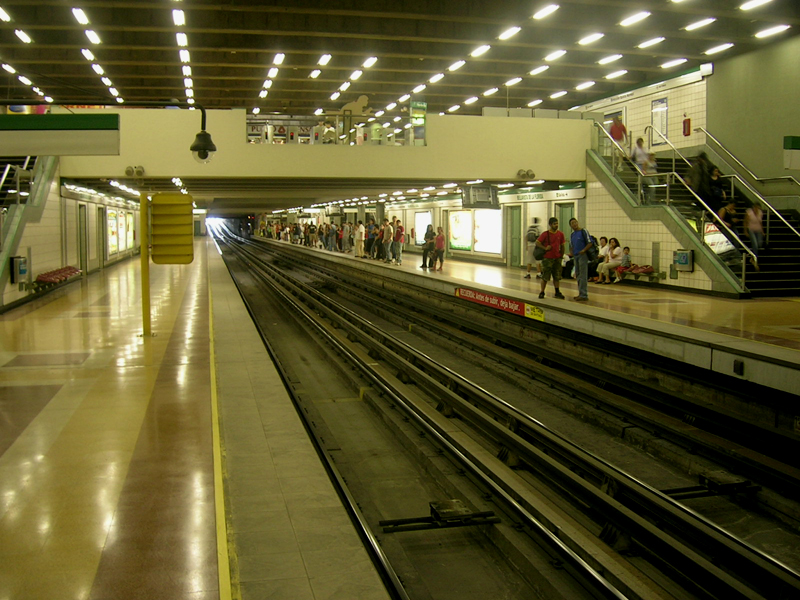

General information
- Location: Vicuña Mackenna Avenue / El Cabildo Street
- Coordinates: 33°31′13.71″S 70°35′57.82″W
- System: Santiago rapid transit
- Line: Line 5
- Platforms: 2 side platforms
- Tracks: 2
- Connections: Transantiago buses

Construction
- Accessible: yes

History
- Opened: April 5, 1997

Services
Preceding station	Santiago Metro	Following station
Mirador towards Plaza de Maipú	Line 5	Vicente Valdés Terminus
Location

Bellavista de La Florida is an underground metro station on the Line 5 of the Santiago Metro, in Santiago, Chile. The station was opened on 5 April 1997 as the southern terminus of the original extension of the line from Baquedano. It served as the southern terminus of the Line 5 until Vicente Valdés metro station was opened on November 30, 2005. Despite their proximity, there is no direct connection between Bellavista and Vicuña Mackenna metro station.

Like Rondizzoni metro station, Bellavista de La Florida was flooded in June 2000.

Nearby landmarks include Mall Plaza Vespucio and the town hall of La Florida, the district where the station is located.

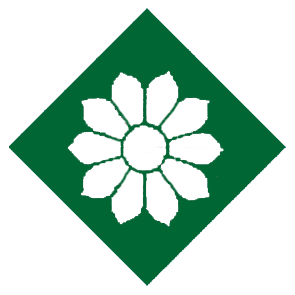
Old symbol with which the station was identified.
