= Baquedano metro station =

Santiago metro station

Baquedano
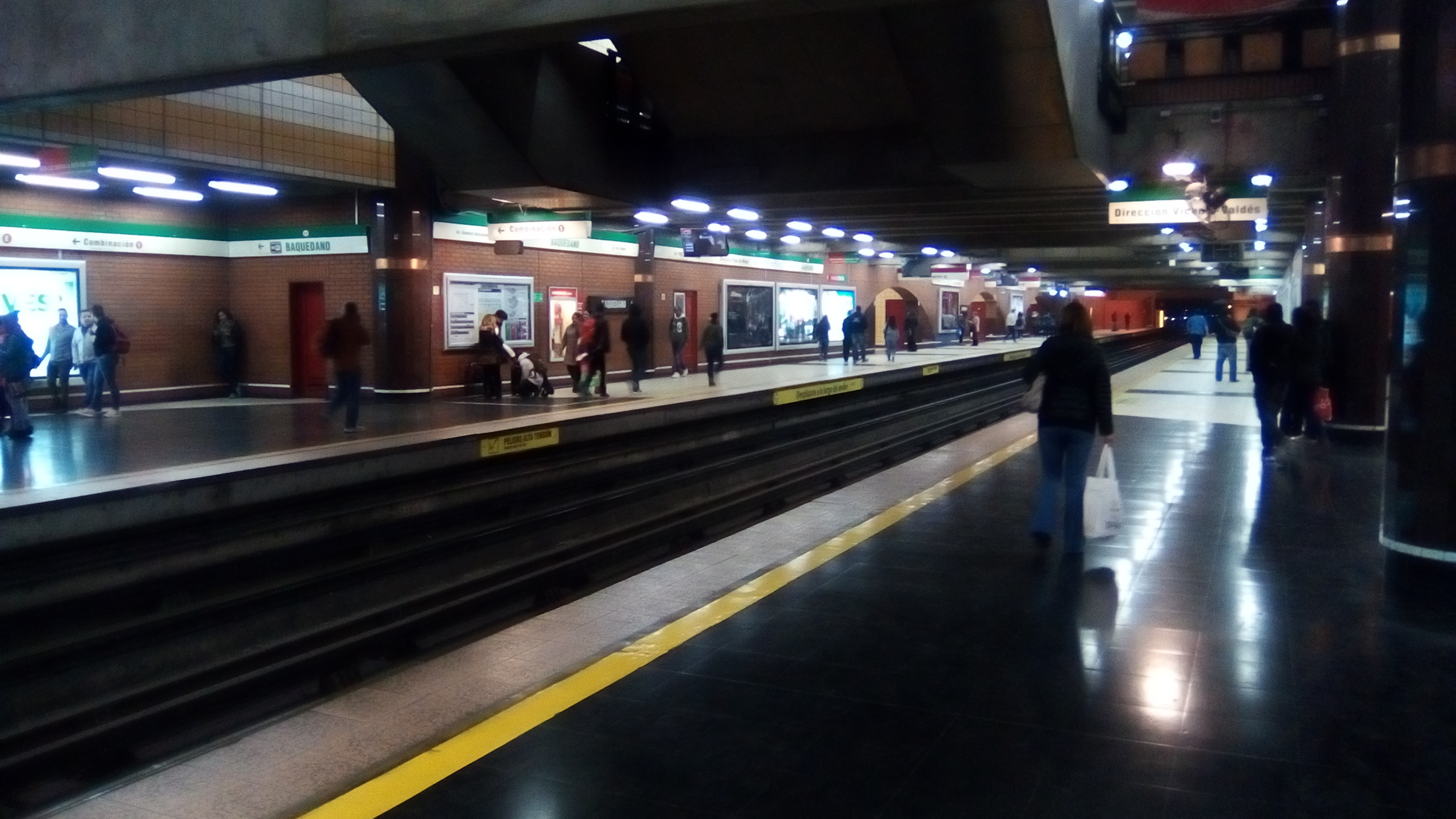
- Line 5 platform

General information
- Location: Providencia Avenue / General Bustamante Avenue
- Coordinates: 33°26′15″S 70°38′6″W
- System: Santiago rapid transit
- Lines: Line 1 Line 5
- Platforms: 2 side platforms at each line
- Tracks: 2 per line
- Connections: Red buses

Construction
- Accessible: yes

History
- Opened: March 31, 1977; April 5, 1997; 2028

Services
Preceding station	Santiago Metro	Following station
Universidad Católica towards San Pablo	Line 1	Salvador towards Los Dominicos
Bellas Artes towards Plaza de Maipú	Line 5	Parque Bustamante towards Vicente Valdés
Location

Baquedano is a transfer station between the Line 1 and Line 5 of the Santiago Metro. It is located close to the eastern terminus of the Avenida Libertador General Bernardo O'Higgins. The station was initially a single-line station on the Line 1, later was enlarged since the Line 5's opening date. there are plans for the future line 7 to intersect with this station.

The Line 1 station was opened on 31 March 1977 as part of the extension of the line from La Moneda to Salvador. The Line 5 station was opened on 5 April 1997 as the northern terminus of the inaugural section of the line, from Baquedano to Bellavista de La Florida. On 3 March 2000, the line was extended to Santa Ana.
