= Pudahuel metro station =

Santiago metro station

Pudahuel
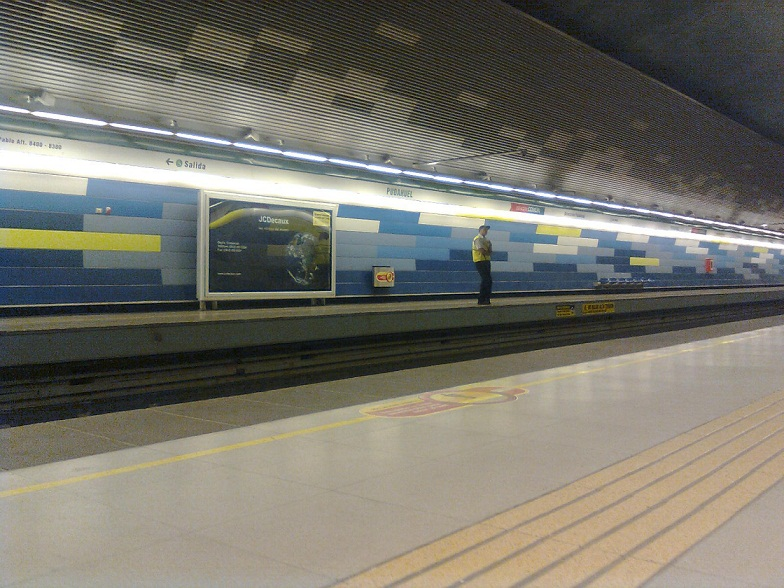
- Station platform

General information
- Location: San Pablo Avenue / Teniente Cruz Avenue
- Coordinates: 33°26′41.79″S 70°44′27.79″W
- System: Santiago rapid transit
- Line: Line 5
- Platforms: 2 side platforms
- Tracks: 2
- Connections: Transantiago buses

Construction
- Structure type: Underground
- Accessible: yes

History
- Opened: January 12, 2010

Services
Preceding station	Santiago Metro	Following station
Barrancas towards Plaza de Maipú	Line 5	San Pablo towards Vicente Valdés
Location

Pudahuel is a rapid transit station on the Line 5. It is located underneath the junction of San Pablo Avenue and Teniente Cruz Avenue, underneath the border of Pudahuel and Lo Prado.

The station was opened on January 12, 2010 by president Michelle Bachelet, as part of the lLine's extension from Quinta Normal to Pudahuel, and was the Line's western terminus until 3 February 2011 when the line was extended southwest towards Plaza de Maipú.

In the surrounding area can be found the Pudahuel municipality building, a supermarket, a share taxis stop and several bus stops.

After Pudahuel, Line 5 makes an abrupt turn to the southwest towards Maipú, right under the commune hall. This bend can be seen from the platform (see the photo gallery).

== Etymology ==
The station was named after the Pudahuel town hall, located at the main exit.

== Infrastructure ==
The station has two exits, all in Pudahuel; as a result of this, the station serves Lo Prado indirectly. Both exits are in the northeast and southeast blocks of the San Pablo and Teniente Cruz junction.

The station covers an overall area of 3,100 m^{2} (33,000 sq ft)

== Photo gallery ==
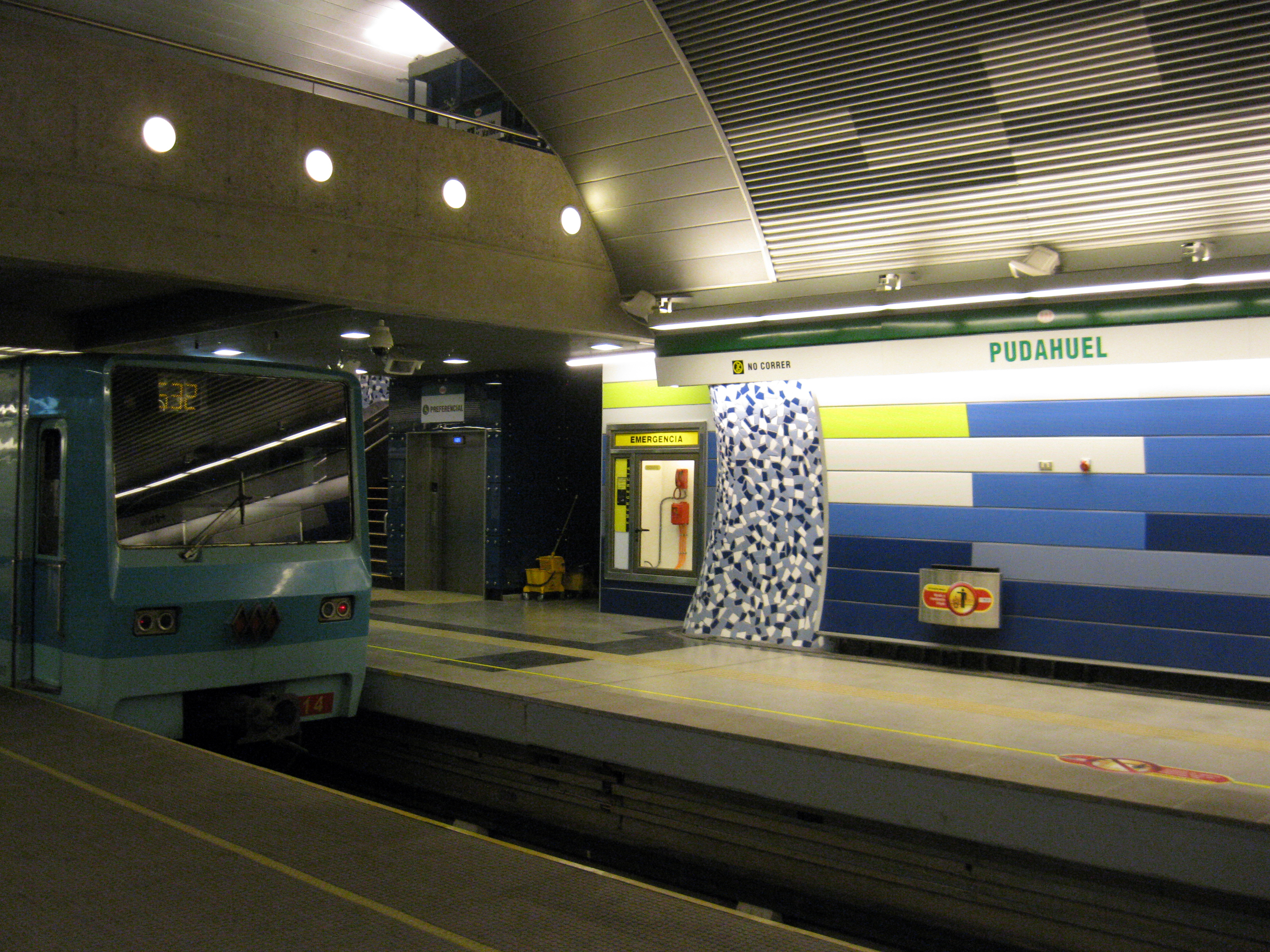
Inside the station, prior to the southwest extension of Line 5

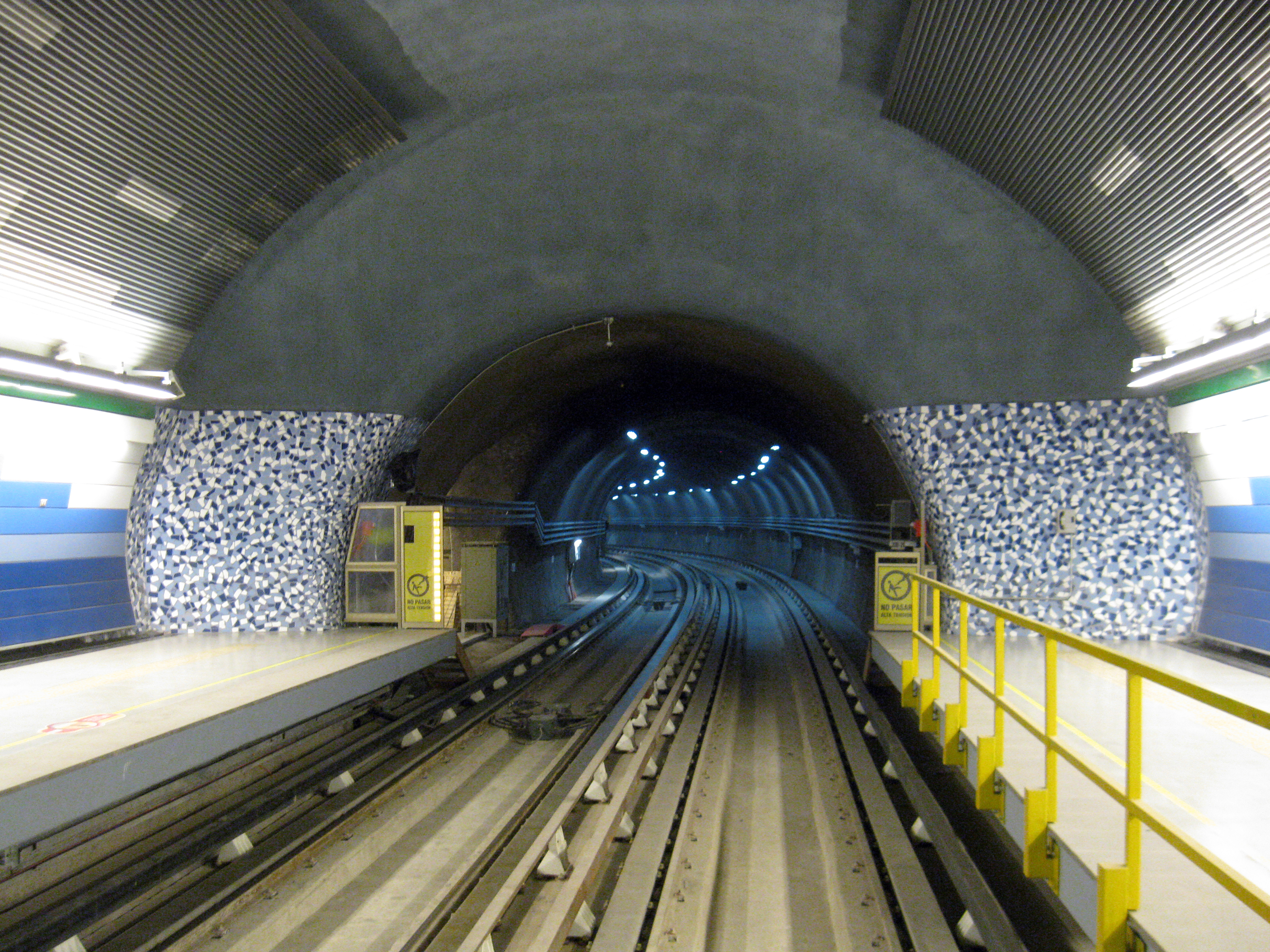
Tunnel towards Maipú, also prior to the Line's extension to the southwest
