= Vicuña Mackenna Avenue =

Chilean Roadway

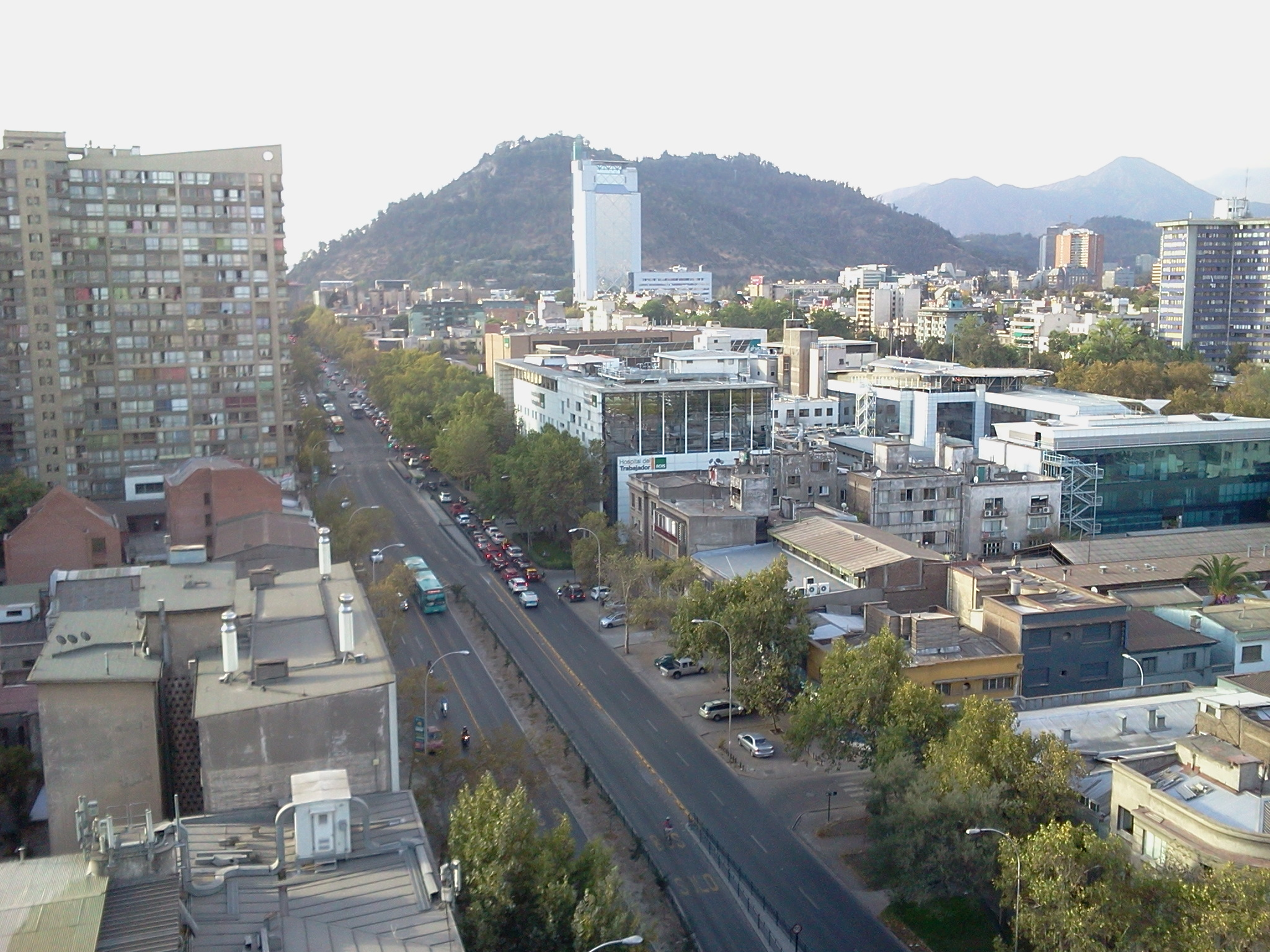
- Interactive map of Vicuña Mackenna Avenue
- Location: Santiago, Chile

Avenida Vicuña Mackenna (Vicuña Mackenna Avenue) is one of the main transport arteries of Santiago, Chile, joining Santiago center with more remote urban centers such as the communes of La Florida and Puente Alto.

Vicuña Mackenna Avenue begins at the intersection between the Alameda, in Plaza Italia, extending south towards the commune of Puente Alto, where its name changes to Avenida Concha y Toro. It crosses the communes of Santiago, Providencia, Ñuñoa, San Joaquín, Macul and La Florida and intersects with the urban highway Autopista Vespucio Sur.

Vicuña Mackenna Avenue is currently covered by Line 5 of the Santiago Metro up to Vicente Valdés metro station, then by Line 4 up to Plaza de Puente Alto.

This road emerged from a project by Santiago mayor Benjamín Vicuña Mackenna to build a perimeter road around Santiago called Camino de Cintura (literally “waistline road”). Vicuña Mackenna's former residence is now the site of a museum dedicated to his memory.

== Notable buildings ==
- Ex Embajada de Argentina en Chile
