= Plaza de Maipú metro station =

Santiago metro station

Plaza de Maipú
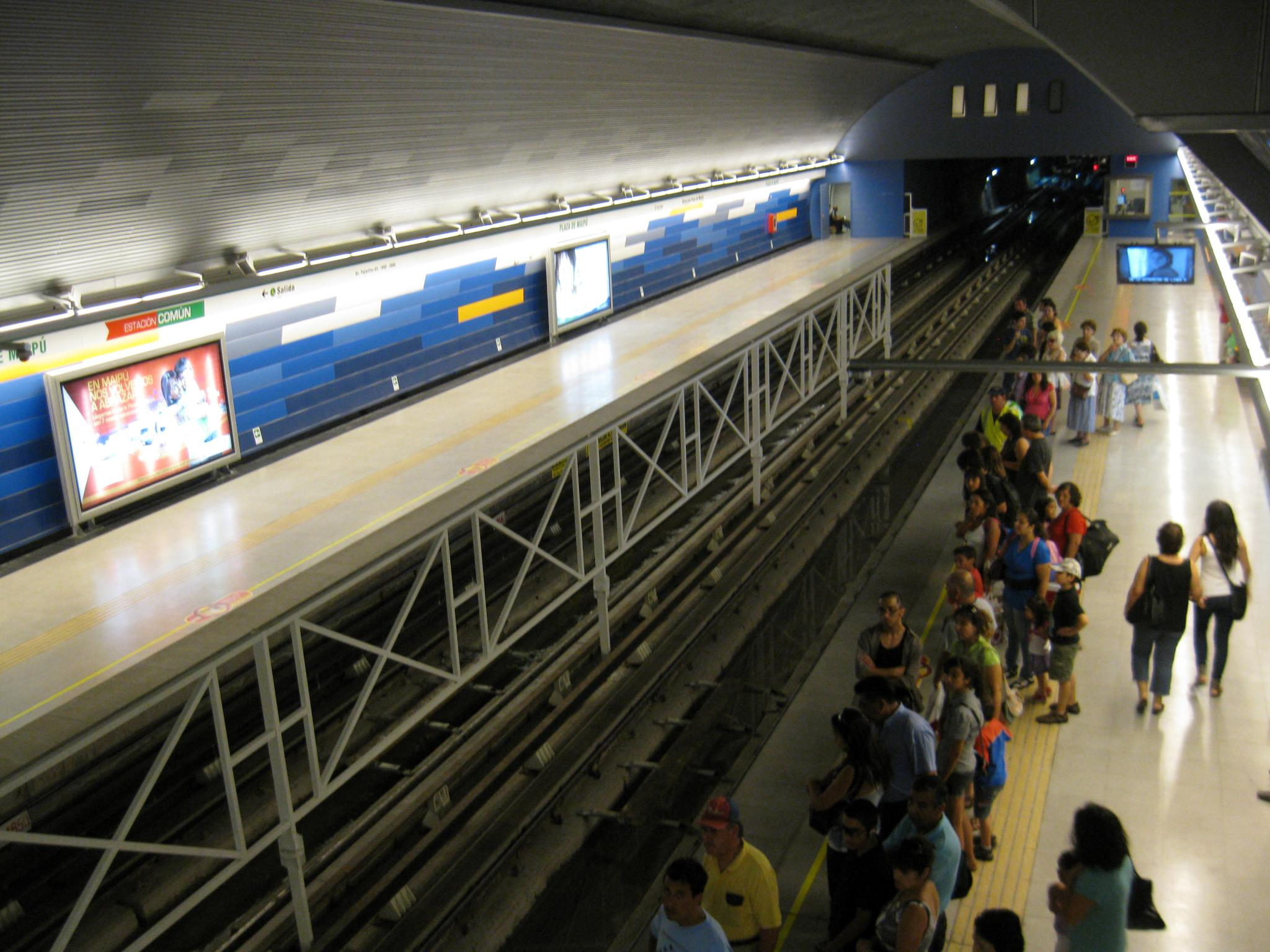

General information
- Location: Pajaritos Avenue / 5 de Abril Avenue
- Coordinates: 33°30′36.07″S 70°45′25.11″W
- System: Santiago rapid transit
- Line: Line 5
- Platforms: 2 side platforms
- Tracks: 2
- Connections: Transantiago buses

Construction
- Accessible: yes

History
- Opened: February 3, 2011

Services
Preceding station	Santiago Metro	Following station
Terminus	Line 5	Santiago Bueras towards Vicente Valdés
Location

Plaza de Maipú is an underground metro station on Line 5 of the Santiago Metro, in Santiago, Chile. The station is located under the Plaza de Armas of Maipú. It was formerly the deepest station in the Santiago Metro system at 28 metres (92 ft) deep. However, this has since been surpassed by the Line 3 platforms at Puente Cal y Canto station. The station was opened on 3 February 2011 as the southwestern terminus of the extension of the line from Pudahuel to Plaza de Maipú.

The platform level of the station is built in a mined tunnel with an oval cross section. At their eastern ends, two also tunneled transepts open into a large, deep cut-and-cover box. The ticket hall is on the first level down of this volume. Multi-level escalators, elevators and stairways lead to the surface.

== Shooting ==
Five months after its opening, the Plaza de Maipú station was the scene of one of the only two acts of violence with fatal victims in the history of the Santiago Metro (together with the simultaneous attacks on trains at the Tobalaba and Los Héroes stations, both of Line 1, in 1986). On July 17, 2011, 45-year-old Israel del Carmen Huerta Céspedes pulled a 9mm CZ-75 semi-automatic handgun from his coat and began shooting for no apparent reason to the passengers of a car that was arriving at the terminal station. The passengers activated the emergency brake and the perpetrator managed to walk out of the station and then climb to the Plaza de Armas de Maipú, walking one block and then committing suicide.

Huerta did not have a criminal record. He was born in the rural town of Las Cabras and arrived in 1980 to live in Rinconada de Maipú with his parents and ten brothers. He had no stable job and in 1994 was dismissed from his job as a cleaning assistant in a police investigation station in Chile in La Reina for misconduct. Relatives and close friends described him as a peaceful and kind person, but who had entered a strong depression after the death of his mother, two months before the attack.

The shooting left several wounded, three seriously and two (Fernando Oñate Muñoz and Mario Acevedo Meneses) who later died while being treated in hospitals. After the attack, Metro suspended the operations of Line 5 between stations Plaza de Maipú and Las Parcelas for the development of the investigation.
