= Vicente Valdés metro station =

Santiago metro station

Vicente Valdés
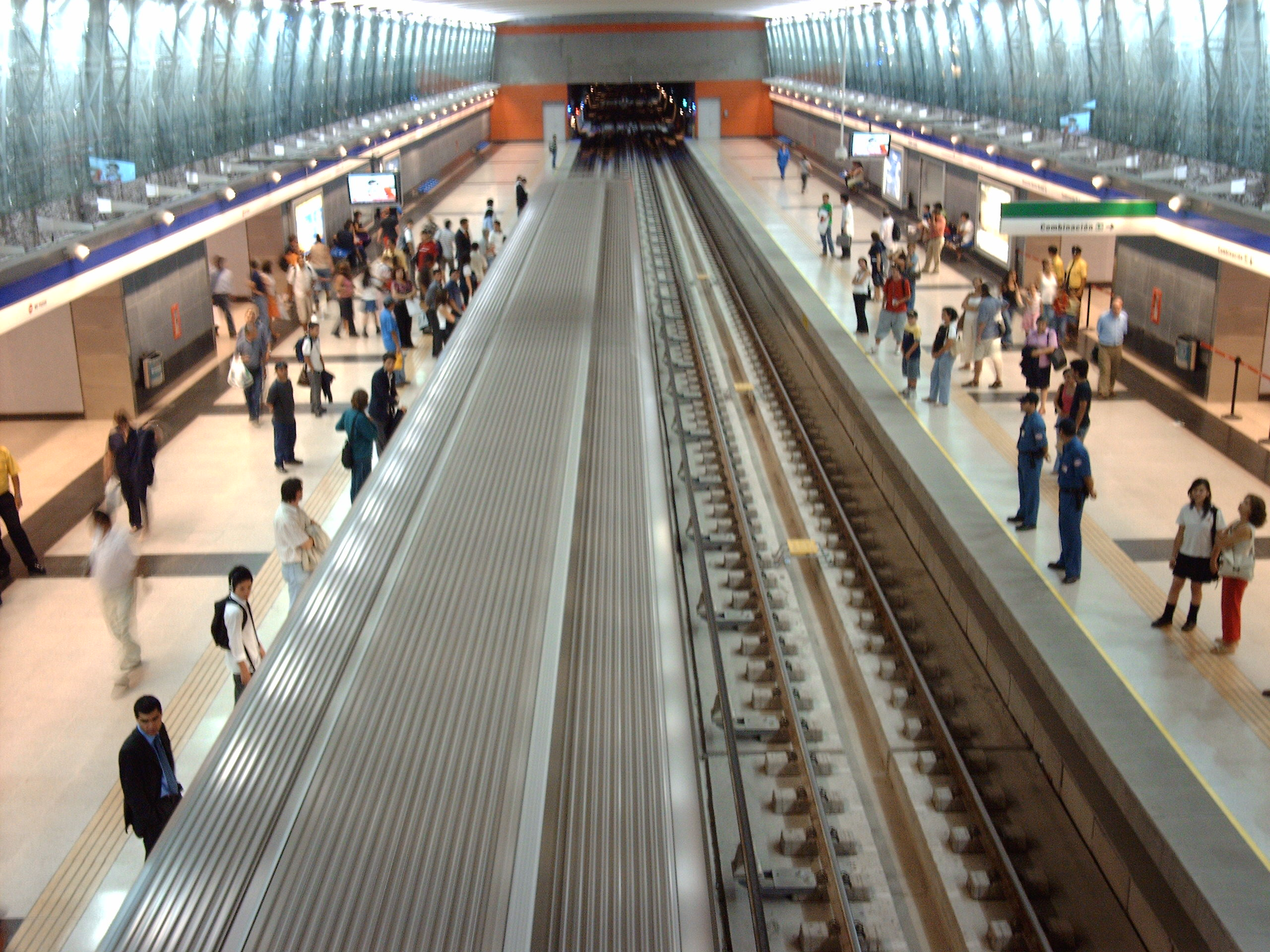
- Vicente Valdés station on Line 4.

General information
- Coordinates: 33°31′35.45″S 70°35′48.35″W
- System: Santiago rapid transit
- Lines: Line 4 Line 5
- Platforms: 2 side platforms for each line
- Tracks: 2 per line
- Connections: Transantiago buses

Construction
- Accessible: yes

History
- Opened: November 30, 2005

Services
Preceding station	Santiago Metro	Following station
Vicuña Mackenna towards Tobalaba	Line 4	Rojas Magallanes towards Plaza de Puente Alto
Bellavista de La Florida towards Plaza de Maipú	Line 5	Terminus
Location

Vicente Valdés is a completely underground transfer station between the Line 4 and Line 5 of the Santiago Metro. The Line 4 station was opened on 30 November 2005 as the northern terminus of the inaugural section of the line between Vicente Valdés and Plaza de Puente Alto. The line 5 station was opened at the same day as a one station extension from Bellavista de La Florida. On 2 March 2006, Line 4 was extended north to Grecia.
