= Independencia Avenue (Santiago de Chile) =

Avenue in Santiago, Chile

The Avenida Independencia (known as Camino de Chile during the colonial era, and known as La Cañadilla from mid-18th century until the beginning of the Patria Nueva) is a major north-south thoroughfare in Santiago de Chile, running 8.1 km through the districts of Conchalí and Independencia, giving its name to the latter. The name comes from the fact that on February 13, 1817, following the Battle of Chacabuco (a key event in the Chilean Independence), the Army of the Andes camped in the area known presently as Plaza Chacabuco, and moved along the road to make a triumphal entry into Santiago.

== History ==
This avenue was originally a branch of the Inca road system, named Camino de Chile, and was for several centuries the main road access to the city. The Spanish conquistadors Diego de Almagro and Pedro de Valdivia arrived on the banks of the Mapocho River following this road.

The original name was used until mid-18th century, when casaquintas were built on the sides of this road and began to be called La Cañadilla, meaning small Cañada, which was the name given to the Alameda during that period.

On February 13, 1817, the first troops of the Army of the Andes arrived at the present-day Plaza Chacabuco, so-called in commemoration of the battle fought the previous day.

Since the 1950s, the district of Independencia began to be turned into a commercial area, after having undergone urban decay for decades.

== Notable buildings ==
- Iglesia del Monasterio del Carmen Bajo de San Rafael
- Cervecería Ebner

== Transport ==
Line 3 of the Santiago Metro runs under the entire length of the avenue, stopping at Cardenal Caro, Vivaceta, Conchalí, Plaza Chacabuco and Hospitales metro stations.
