= Irarrázaval metro station =

Santiago metro station

Irarrázaval
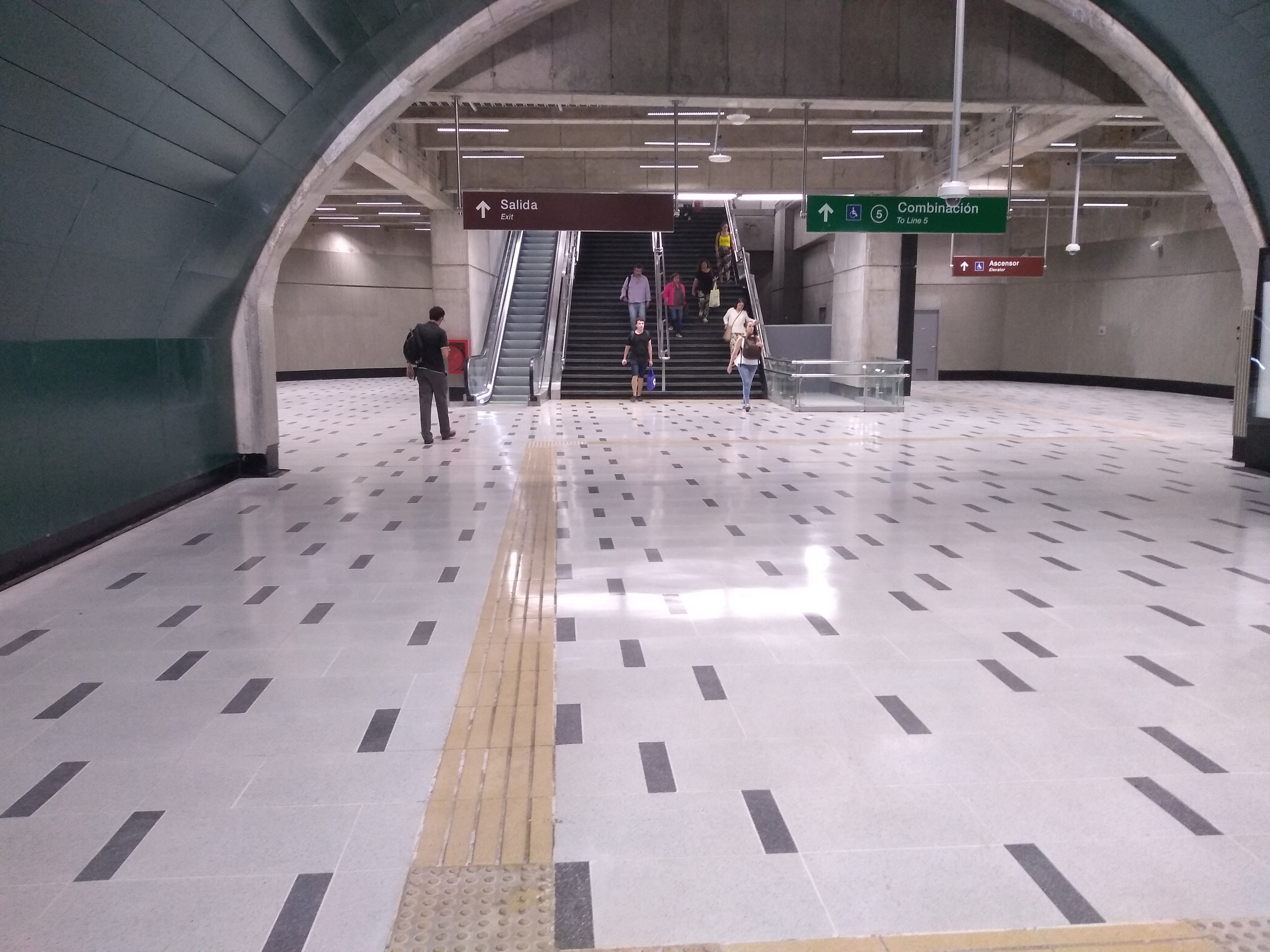
- Level of combination between lines 3 and 5.

General information
- Location: General Bustamante Avenue / Irarrázaval Avenue
- Coordinates: 33°27′10″S 70°37′44″W
- System: Santiago rapid transit
- Lines: Line 3 Line 5
- Platforms: 2 side platforms
- Tracks: 2
- Connections: Transantiago buses

Construction
- Accessible: yes

History
- Opened: 5 April 1997; 22 January 2019

Services
Preceding station	Santiago Metro	Following station
Matta towards Plaza Quilicura	Line 3	Monseñor Eyzaguirre towards Fernando Castillo Velasco
Santa Isabel towards Plaza de Maipú	Line 5	Ñuble towards Vicente Valdés
Location

Irarrázaval is a transfer station between the Line 3 and Line 5 of the Santiago Metro in Chile. The station is so named due to its location beneath Avenida Irarrázaval, a main road of the commune of Ñuñoa, which in turn was named after the Chilean lawyer and politician Manuel José Yrarrázaval Larraín. The Line 5 station was opened on 5 April 1997 as part of the inaugural section of the line, from Baquedano to Bellavista de La Florida. The Line 3 station was opened on 22 January 2019 as part of the inaugural section of the line, from Los Libertadores to Fernando Castillo Velasco. Construction of the 6.5 km tunnel between Irarrázaval and Fernando Castillo Velasco was completed in 2017 on a budget of 145 million euro.

The station is located underground, between stations Santa Isabel to the north and Ñuble to the south. Vicuña Mackenna Avenue is one block to the west of the station.

Access to Irarrázaval metro station is via Avenida General Bustamante as it intersects with Avenida Irarrázaval, and via the interior of Bustamante Park facing Avenida Irarrázaval. The station also has disability access.

Old symbol with which the station was identified.

== History ==
The metro station's name, Irarrázaval, refers to the Irarrázaval Avenue that goes over the station. The name Irarrázaval comes from Manuel José Yrarrázaval, an important politician, businessman and aristocrat, member of the House of Andia-Irarrázaval.

== Transfer station ==
Irarrázaval metro station is a transfer station for the operating Line 3, which runs between stations Huechuraba to the northeast and Larraín to the east of Santiago, including existing stations Universidad de Chile and Plaza Egaña. Construction on Line 3 began in September 2012.

== Surrounds ==
To the south of the station at the intersection with Grecia Avenue is the site of the former Suárez Mujica Palace, a Neoclassic Greco-Roman construction which was destroyed by fire in 2005. Prior to the disaster this was known as "the haunted house".
