= Monseñor Eyzaguirre metro station =

Santiago metro station

Monseñor Eyzaguirre
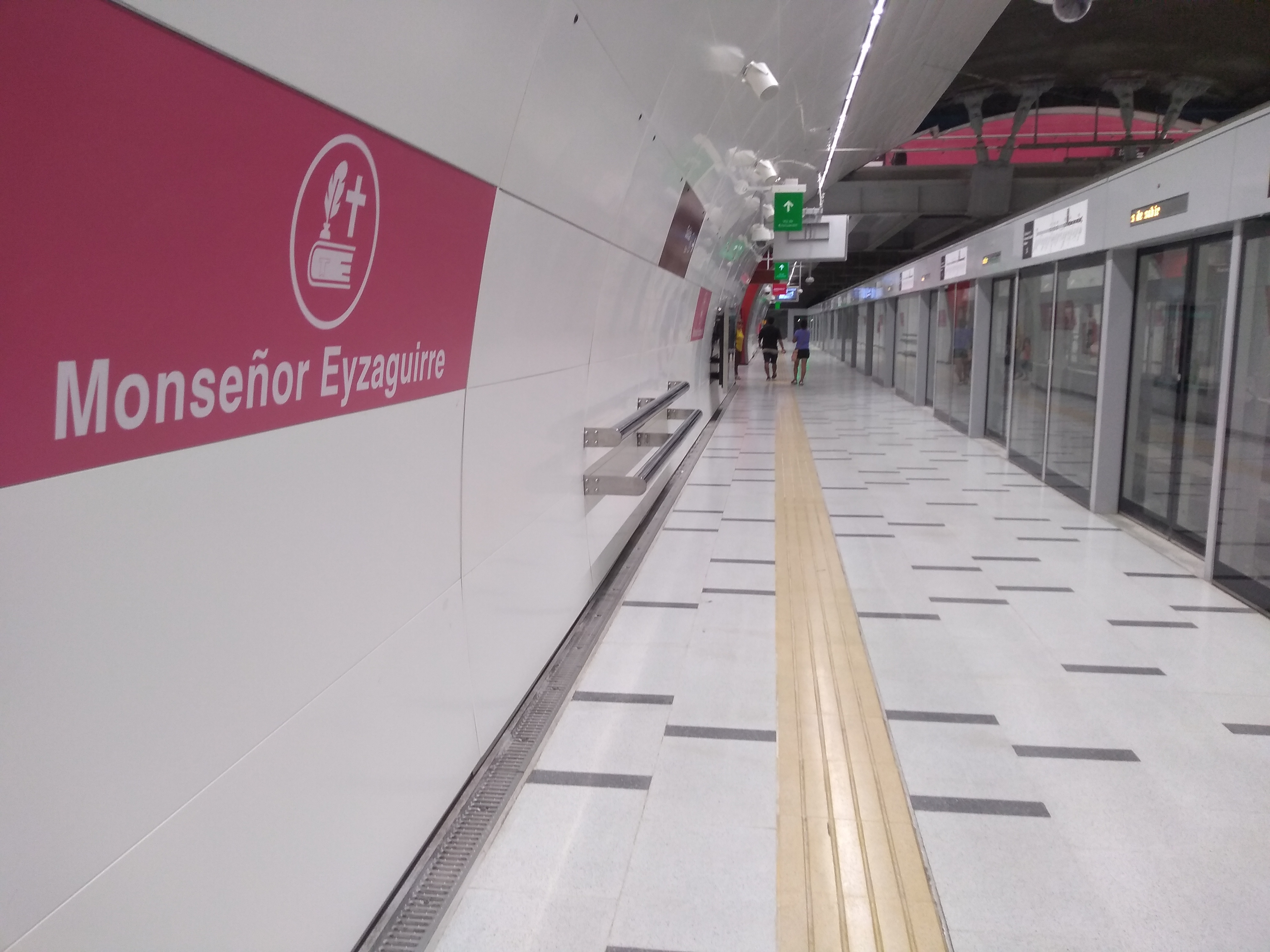

General information
- Location: Irarrázaval Avenue/Monseñor Eyzaguirre Street
- Coordinates: 33°27′16″S 70°34′48″W
- System: Santiago rapid transit
- Line: Line 3
- Platforms: 2 side platforms
- Tracks: 2
- Connections: Transantiago buses

Construction
- Accessible: yes

History
- Opened: 22 January 2019

Services
Preceding station	Santiago Metro	Following station
Irarrázaval towards Plaza Quilicura	Line 3	Ñuñoa towards Fernando Castillo Velasco
Location

Monseñor Eyzaguirre is an underground metro station of Line 3 of the Santiago Metro network, in Santiago, Chile. It lies between the Irarrázaval and Ñuñoa stations on Line 3, and is located at the intersection of Irarrázaval Avenue with Monseñor Eyzaguirre Street. The station was opened on 22 January 2019 as part of the inaugural section of the line, from Los Libertadores to Fernando Castillo Velasco.

== Etymology ==
Its name comes from the fact that it is located on the side of Calle Monseñor Eyzaguirre in the municipality of Ñuñoa. The street recalls José Ignacio Eyzaguirre Portales, ecclesiastic and Chilean historian, and the station's pictogram makes direct reference to Eyzaguirre, presenting characteristic elements of the professions of priest and historian, such as a pen, a cross and a book.
