= Parque Almagro metro station =

Santiago metro station

Parque Almagro
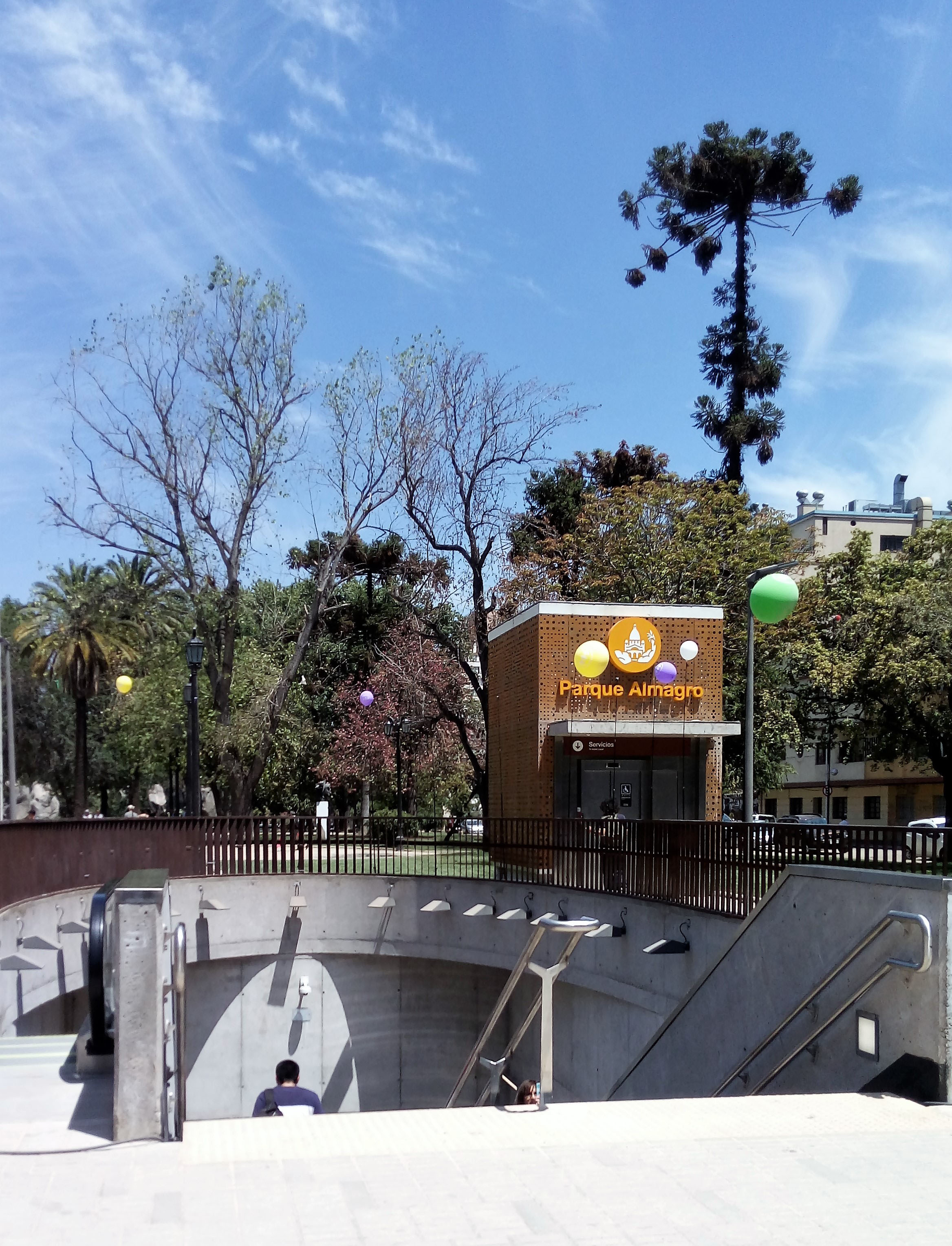
- Access to the station.

General information
- Location: San Diego Avenue/Santa Isabel Avenue
- Coordinates: 33°27′06″S 70°39′03″W
- System: Santiago rapid transit
- Line: Line 3
- Platforms: 2 side platforms
- Tracks: 2
- Connections: Transantiago buses

Construction
- Accessible: yes

History
- Opened: 22 January 2019

Services
Preceding station	Santiago Metro	Following station
Universidad de Chile towards Plaza Quilicura	Line 3	Matta towards Fernando Castillo Velasco
Location

Parque Almagro is an underground metro station of Line 3 of the Santiago Metro network, in Santiago, Chile. It is an underground, between the Universidad de Chile and Matta stations on Line 3. It is located at the intersection of San Diego Avenue with Santa Isabel Avenue. The station was opened on 22 January 2019 as part of the inaugural section of the line, from Los Libertadores to Fernando Castillo Velasco.

== Etymology ==
The station is located near the San Diego neighborhood (ex 10 de Julio) and the Almagro Park. The name of this neighborhood recalls the Battle of Huamachuco, which took place on July 10, 1883 between Chilean and Peruvian troops in the context of the Pacific War.
