= Chile España metro station =

Santiago metro station

Chile España
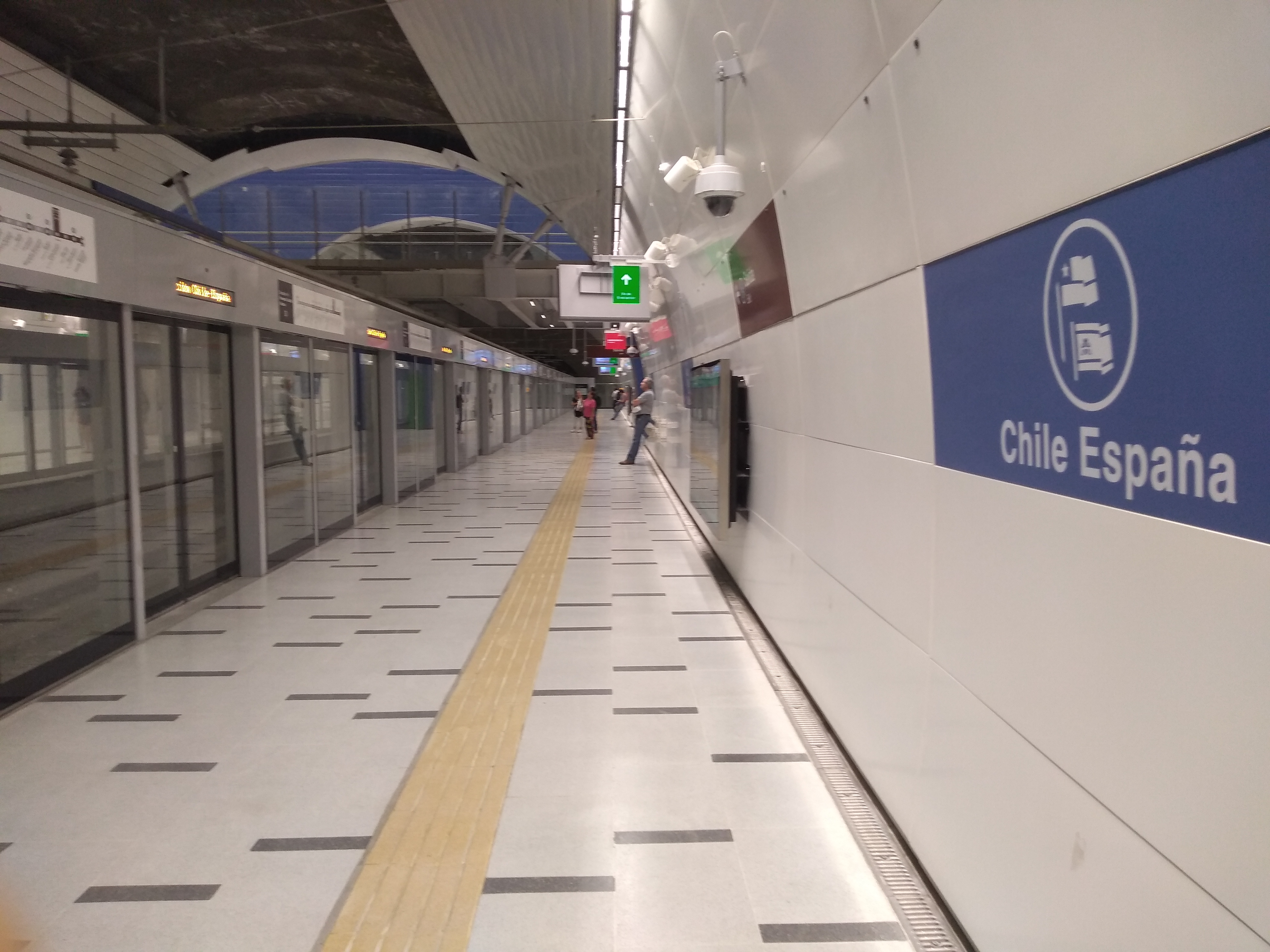

General information
- Location: Irarrázaval Avenue/Chile España Avenue
- Coordinates: 33°27′16″S 70°34′48″W
- System: Santiago rapid transit
- Line: Line 3
- Platforms: 2 side platforms
- Tracks: 2
- Connections: Red buses

Construction
- Accessible: yes

History
- Opened: 22 January 2019; 2032

Services
Preceding station	Santiago Metro	Following station
Ñuñoa towards Plaza Quilicura	Line 3	Villa Frei towards Fernando Castillo Velasco
Location

Chile España is an underground metro station of Line 3 of the Santiago Metro network, in Santiago, Chile. It is an underground, between the Ñuñoa and Villa Frei stations on Line 3. It is located at the intersection of Irarrázaval Avenue with Chile España Avenue. The station was opened on 22 January 2019 as part of the inaugural section of the line, from Los Libertadores to Fernando Castillo Velasco.

It is expected that by the year 2032 it will become a combination station with the future Line 8.

== Etymology ==
The station takes its name directly from the intersection where it is located, Irarrázaval Avenue with Chile-Spain Avenue in the municipality of Ñuñoa. At first its name was "Plaza Armenia", because it will be under the square of the same name.
