= Villa Frei metro station =

Santiago metro station

Villa Frei
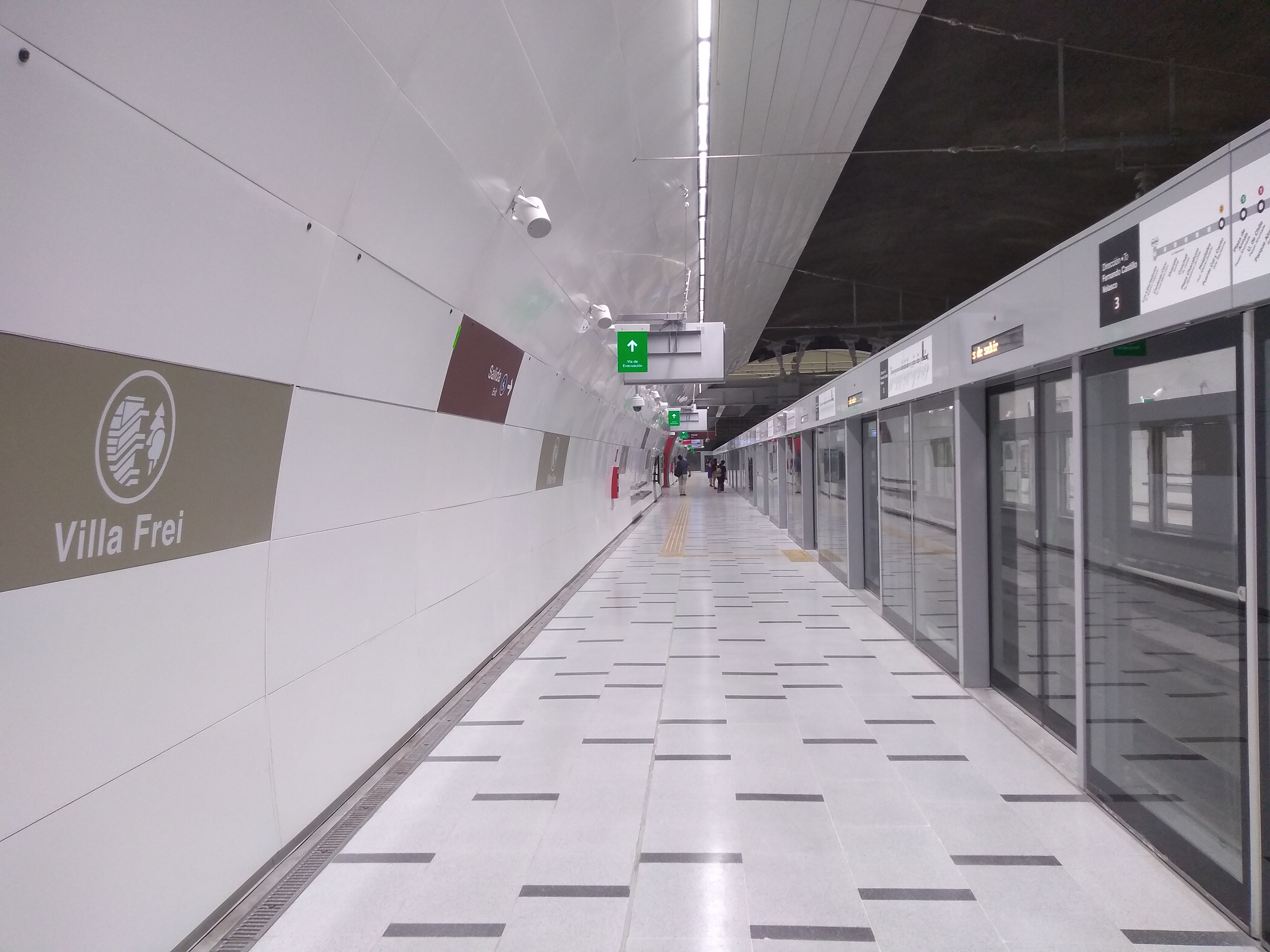
- View of a station platform.

General information
- Location: Irarrázaval Avenue/Ramón Cruz Avenue
- Coordinates: 33°27′16″S 70°34′48″W
- System: Santiago rapid transit
- Line: Line 3
- Platforms: 2 side platforms
- Tracks: 2
- Connections: Transantiago buses

Construction
- Accessible: yes

History
- Opened: 22 January 2019

Services
Preceding station	Santiago Metro	Following station
Chile España towards Plaza Quilicura	Line 3	Plaza Egaña towards Fernando Castillo Velasco
Location

Villa Frei is an underground metro station of Line 3 of the Santiago Metro network, in Santiago, Chile. It is an underground, between the Chile España and Plaza Egaña stations on Line 3. It is located at the intersection of Irarrázaval Avenue with Ramón Cruz Avenue. The station was opened on 22 January 2019 as part of the inaugural section of the line, from Los Libertadores to Fernando Castillo Velasco.

== Etymology ==
The station is close to the Villa Frei, a residential complex inaugurated during the government of Eduardo Frei Montalva in 1968 and that was later declared a Typical Zone in 2015. The pictogram of the station represents the characteristic design of the stairs They own the buildings of the Villa Frei together with a group of trees.

Initially the station was going to be called "Diagonal Oriente" because it was located at the corner of said street.
