= Matta metro station =

Santiago metro station

Matta
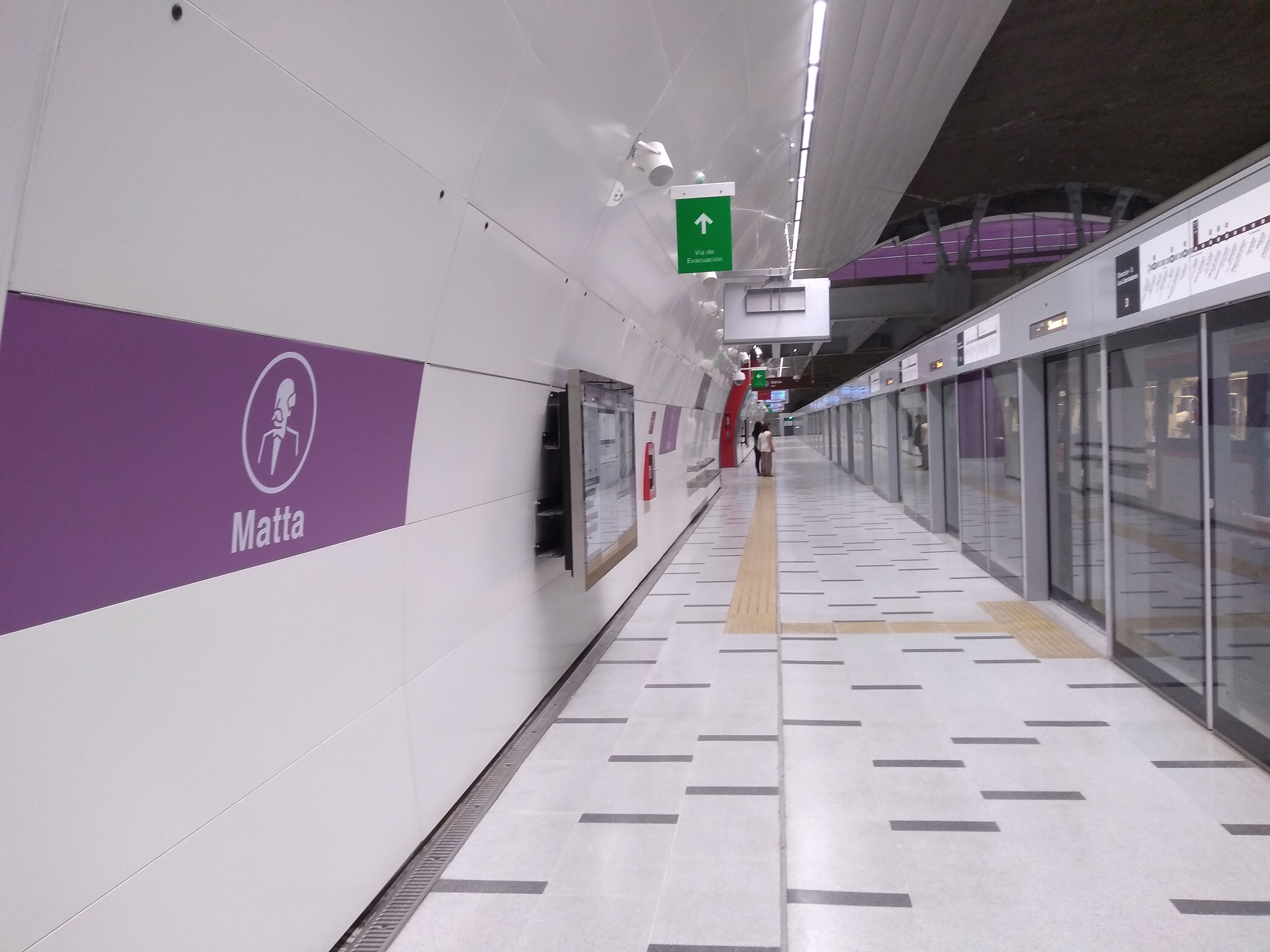
- View of one of the platforms of the station.

General information
- Location: Matta Avenue/Santa Rosa Avenue
- Coordinates: 33°27′29″S 70°38′35″W
- System: Santiago rapid transit
- Line: Line 3
- Platforms: 2 side platforms
- Tracks: 2
- Connections: Transantiago buses

Construction
- Accessible: yes

History
- Opened: 22 January 2019; 2032

Services
Preceding station	Santiago Metro	Following station
Parque Almagro towards Plaza Quilicura	Line 3	Irarrázaval towards Fernando Castillo Velasco
Location

Matta is an underground metro station of Line 3 of the Santiago Metro network, in Santiago, Chile. It is an underground, between the Parque Almagro and Irarrázaval stations on Line 3. It is located at the intersection of Matta Avenue with Santa Rosa Avenue. The station was opened on 22 January 2019 as part of the inaugural section of the line, from Los Libertadores to Fernando Castillo Velasco.

It is expected that by 2032 this station will be combined with the future Line 9.

== Etymology ==
The station is called "Matta", since it is located on Avenida Matta. The street remembers Manuel Antonio Matta, who was a politician and lawyer who in 1863 founded the Partido Radical de Chile.
