= Plaza Chacabuco metro station =

Santiago metro station

Plaza Chacabuco
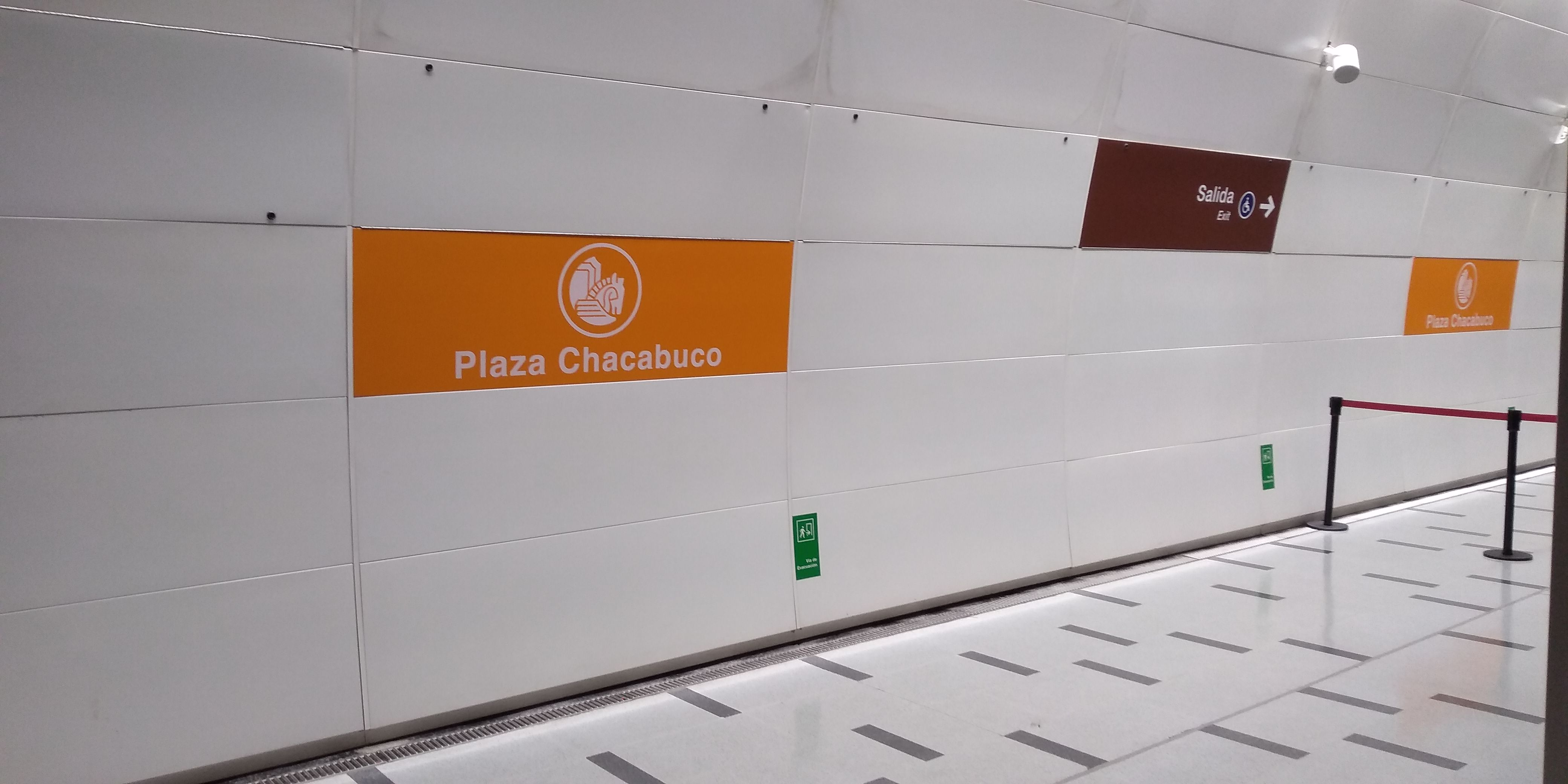

General information
- Location: Independencia Avenue/Hipódromo Chile
- Coordinates: 33°24′23″S 70°39′40″W
- System: Santiago rapid transit
- Line: Line 3
- Platforms: 2 side platforms
- Tracks: 2
- Connections: Transantiago buses

Construction
- Accessible: yes

History
- Opened: 22 January 2019

Services
Preceding station	Santiago Metro	Following station
Conchalí towards Plaza Quilicura	Line 3	Hospitales towards Fernando Castillo Velasco
Location

Plaza Chacabuco is an underground metro station of Line 3 of the Santiago Metro network, in Santiago, Chile. It is an underground, between the Conchalí and Hospitales stations on Line 3. It is located at the intersection of Independencia Avenue with Hipódromo Chile. The station was opened on 22 January 2019 as part of the inaugural section of the line, from Los Libertadores to Fernando Castillo Velasco.

== Etymology ==
The station is located under Plaza Chacabuco; that square receives this name because the Liberation Army was established there after the Battle of Chacabuco, on February 13, 1817. In the pictogram that represents the station, one of the horses that exists at the entrance to the Hippodrome Chile appears.
