= Hospitales metro station (Santiago) =

Santiago metro station

Hospitales
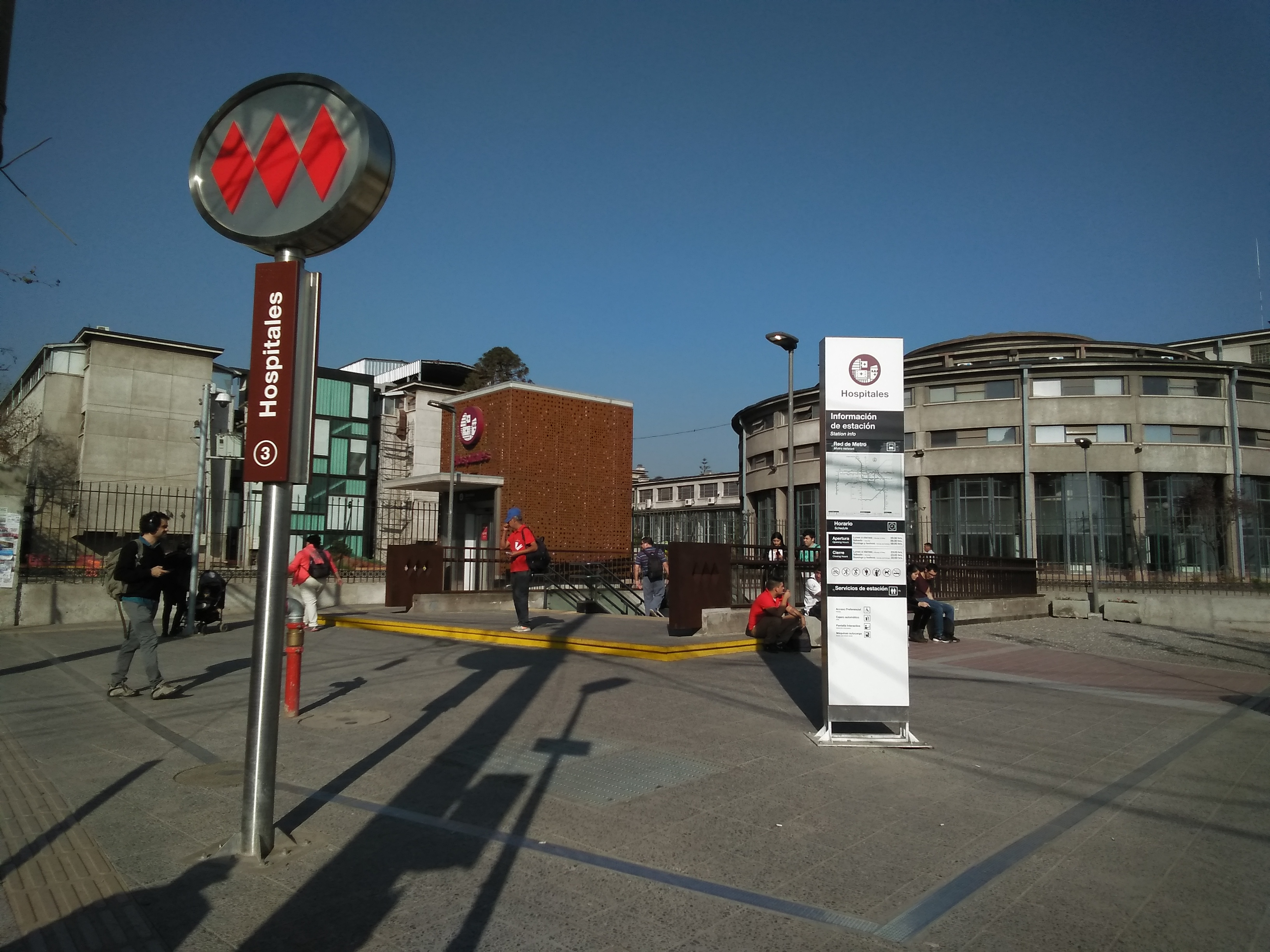
- Access to the station

General information
- Location: Independencia Avenue/Profesor Zañartu Avenue
- Coordinates: 33°25′05″S 70°39′21″W
- System: Santiago rapid transit
- Line: Line 3
- Platforms: 2 side platforms
- Tracks: 2
- Connections: Transantiago buses

Construction
- Accessible: yes

History
- Opened: 22 January 2019

Services
Preceding station	Santiago Metro	Following station
Plaza Chacabuco towards Plaza Quilicura	Line 3	Puente Cal y Canto towards Fernando Castillo Velasco
Location

Hospitales is an underground metro station of Line 3 of the Santiago Metro network, in Santiago, Chile. It is an underground, between the Plaza Chacabuco and Puente Cal y Canto stations on Line 3. It is located at the intersection of Independencia Avenue with Profesor Zañartu Avenue. The station was opened on 22 January 2019 as part of the inaugural section of the line, from Los Libertadores to Fernando Castillo Velasco.

== Etymology ==
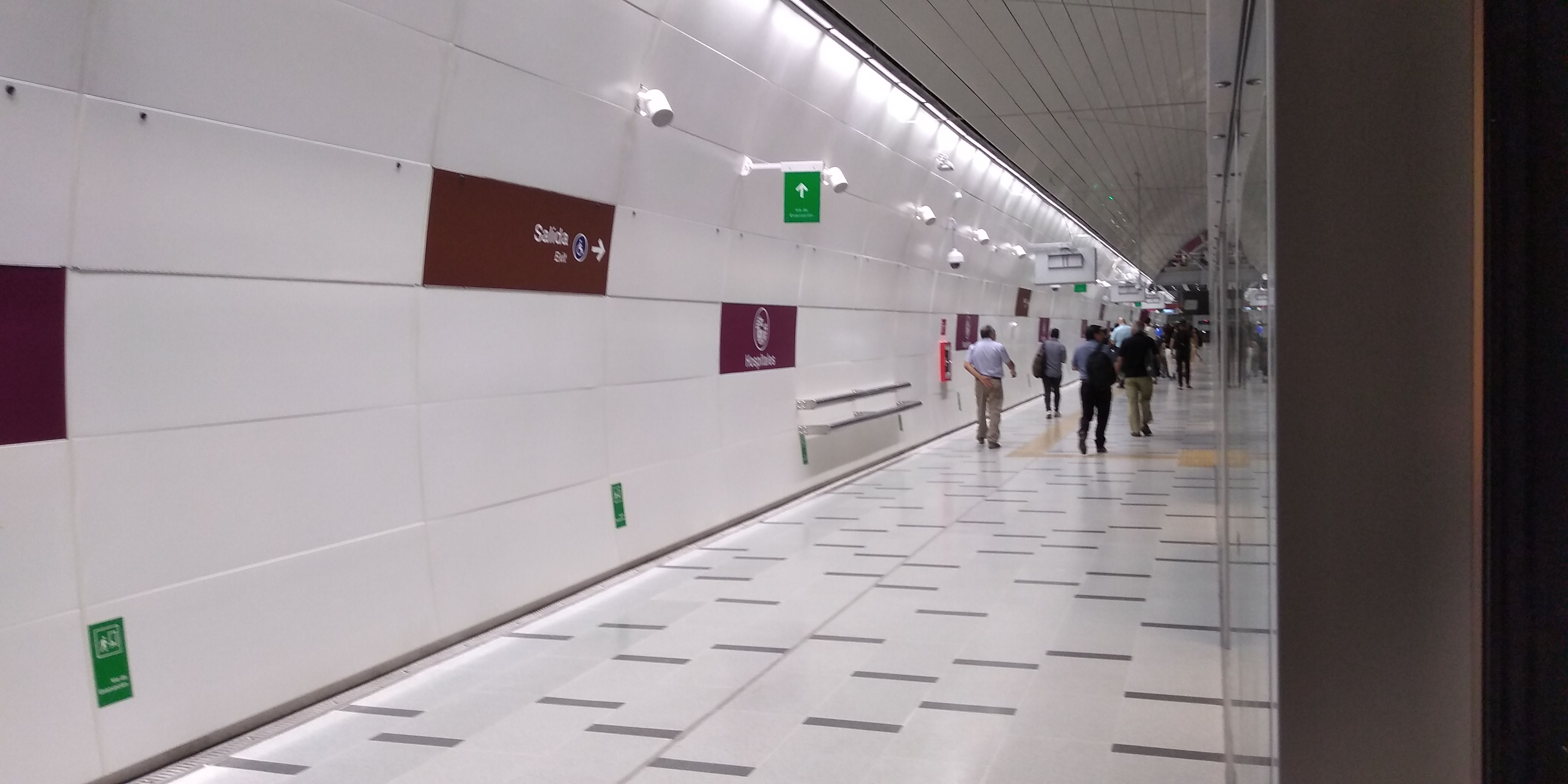
Station platform

The name is due to the fact that near where the station is located are the Hospital Clínico of the University of Chile (formerly José Joaquín Aguirre), San José and Roberto del Río, as well as the National Cancer Institute. In addition, the station is adjacent to the Faculty of Medicine of the University of Chile. The façades of the San José Hospital, the José Joaquín Aguirre Hospital and the National Cancer Institute are presented in the pictogram representing the station.
