= Vivaceta metro station =

Santiago metro station

Vivaceta
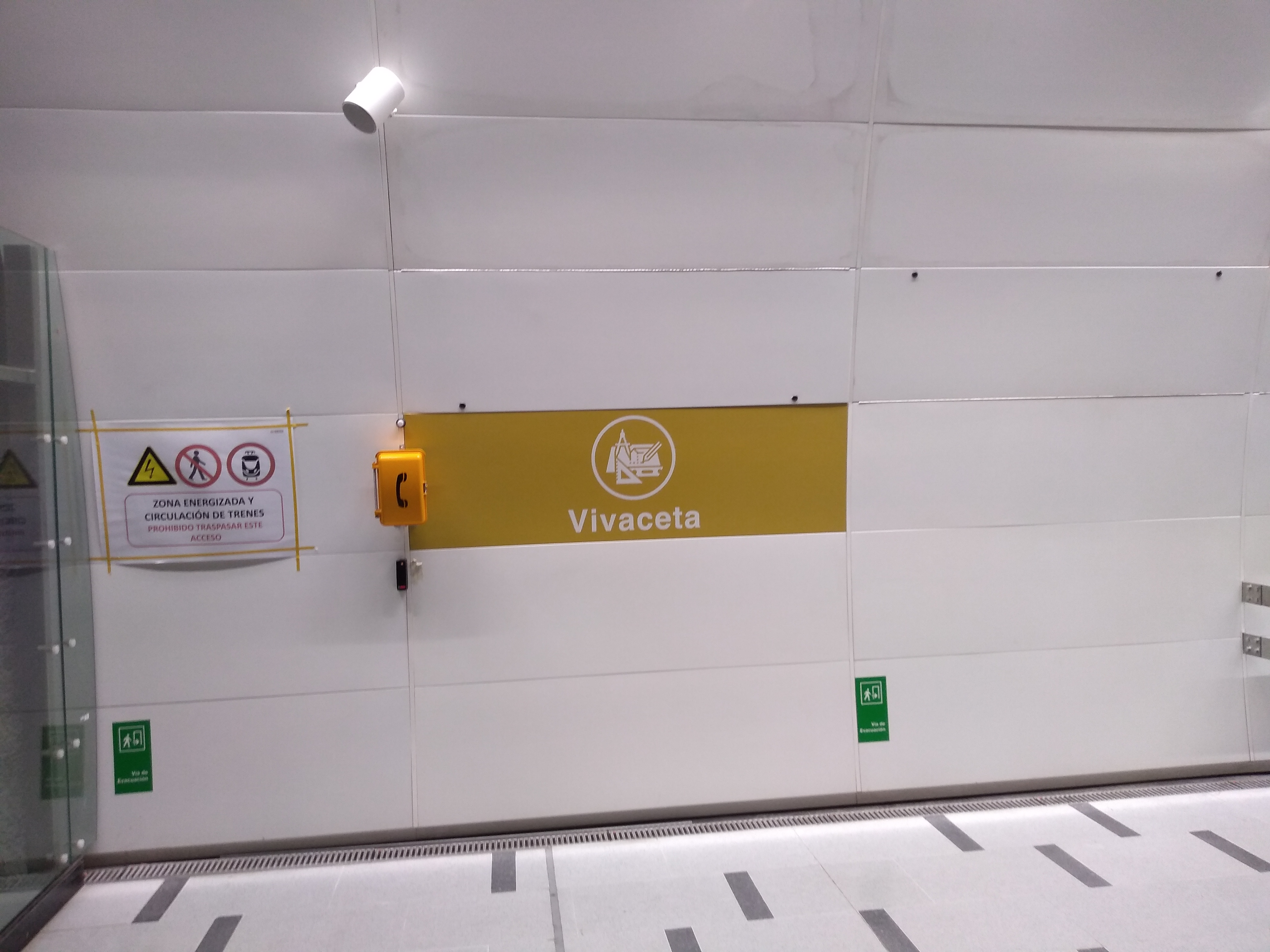

General information
- Location: Independencia Avenue/Paisaje Vecinal
- Coordinates: 33°23′07″S 70°40′46″W
- System: Santiago rapid transit
- Line: Line 3
- Platforms: 2 side platforms
- Tracks: 2
- Connections: Transantiago buses

Construction
- Accessible: yes

History
- Opened: 22 January 2019

Services
Preceding station	Santiago Metro	Following station
Cardenal Caro towards Plaza Quilicura	Line 3	Conchalí towards Fernando Castillo Velasco
Location

Vivaceta is an underground metro station of Line 3 of the Santiago Metro network, in Santiago, Chile. It is an underground, between the Cardenal Caro and Conchalí stations on Line 3. It is located at the intersection of Independencia Avenue with Paisaje Vecinal. The station was opened on 22 January 2019 as part of the inaugural section of the line, from Los Libertadores to Fernando Castillo Velasco.

== Etymology ==
The station is located a few meters from the Avenida Fermín Vivaceta. This avenue recalls Fermín Vivaceta, architect and professor, who designed the buildings of the central house of the University of Chile, the tower of the Church of Saint Francis, the seats of the Alameda de Las Delicias, the Central Market, the Church of The 12 Apostles in Valparaíso and the Bueras Fort among others. The pictogram of the station makes direct reference to the architecture studies of Vivaceta, presenting characteristic elements of that profession.
