= Conchalí metro station =

Santiago metro station

Conchalí
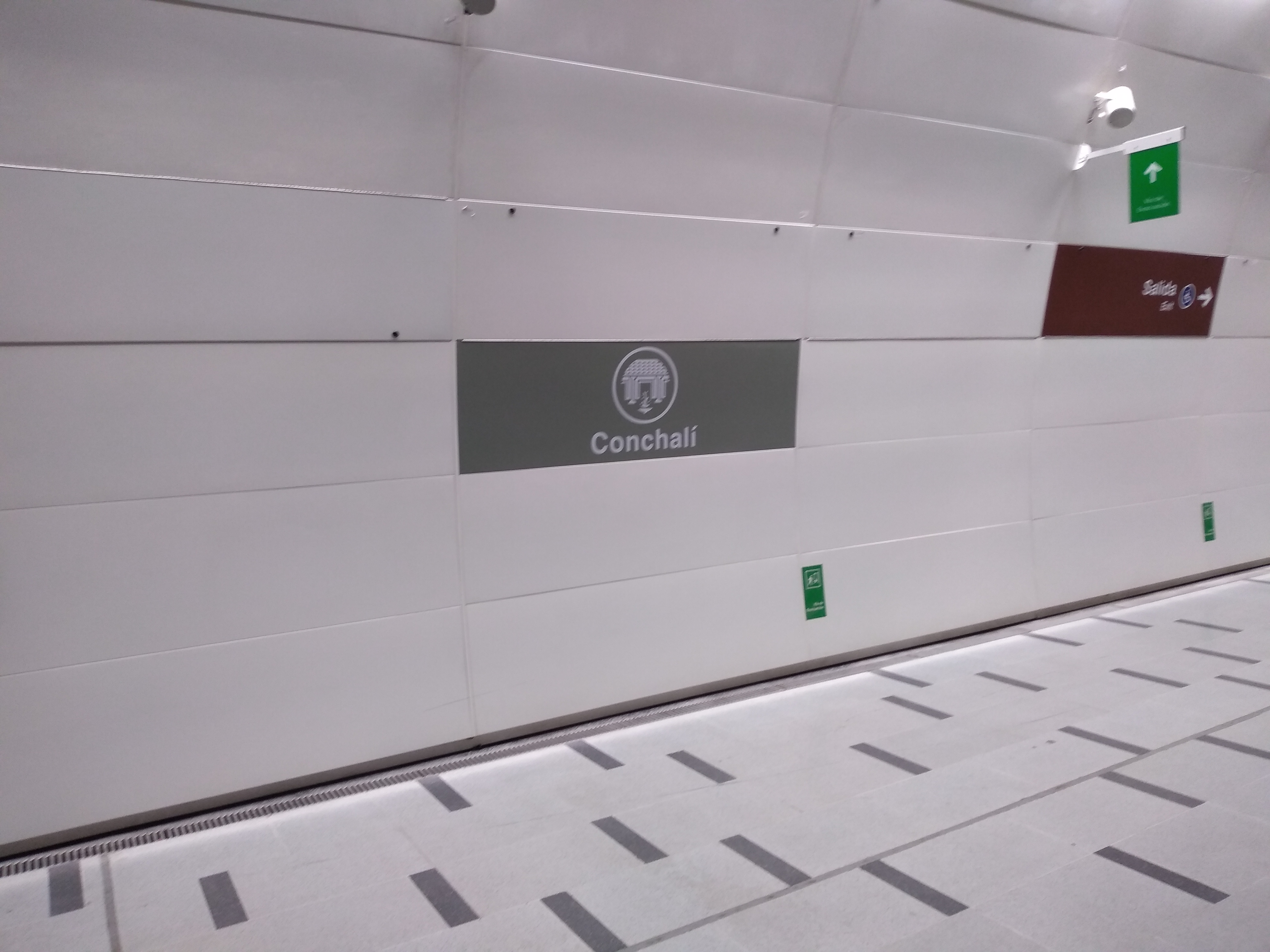

General information
- Location: Independencia Avenue/Dorsal Avenue
- Coordinates: 33°23′51″S 70°40′11″W
- System: Santiago rapid transit
- Line: Line 3
- Platforms: 2 side platforms
- Tracks: 2
- Connections: Transantiago buses

Construction
- Accessible: yes

History
- Opened: 22 January 2019

Services
Preceding station	Santiago Metro	Following station
Vivaceta towards Plaza Quilicura	Line 3	Plaza Chacabuco towards Fernando Castillo Velasco
Location

Conchalí is an underground metro station of Line 3 of the Santiago Metro network, in Santiago, Chile. It is an underground, between the Vivaceta and Plaza Chacabuco stations on Line 3. It is located at the intersection of Independencia Avenue with Dorsal Avenue. The station was opened on 22 January 2019 as part of the inaugural section of the line, from Los Libertadores to Fernando Castillo Velasco.

== Etymology ==
The station is located a few meters from the municipality of Conchalí from which it takes its name. The pictogram of the station presents the main access to the building that houses the Municipality of Conchalí, including part of the existing pool in that access.
