= Ferrocarril metro station =

Santiago metro station

Ferrocarril
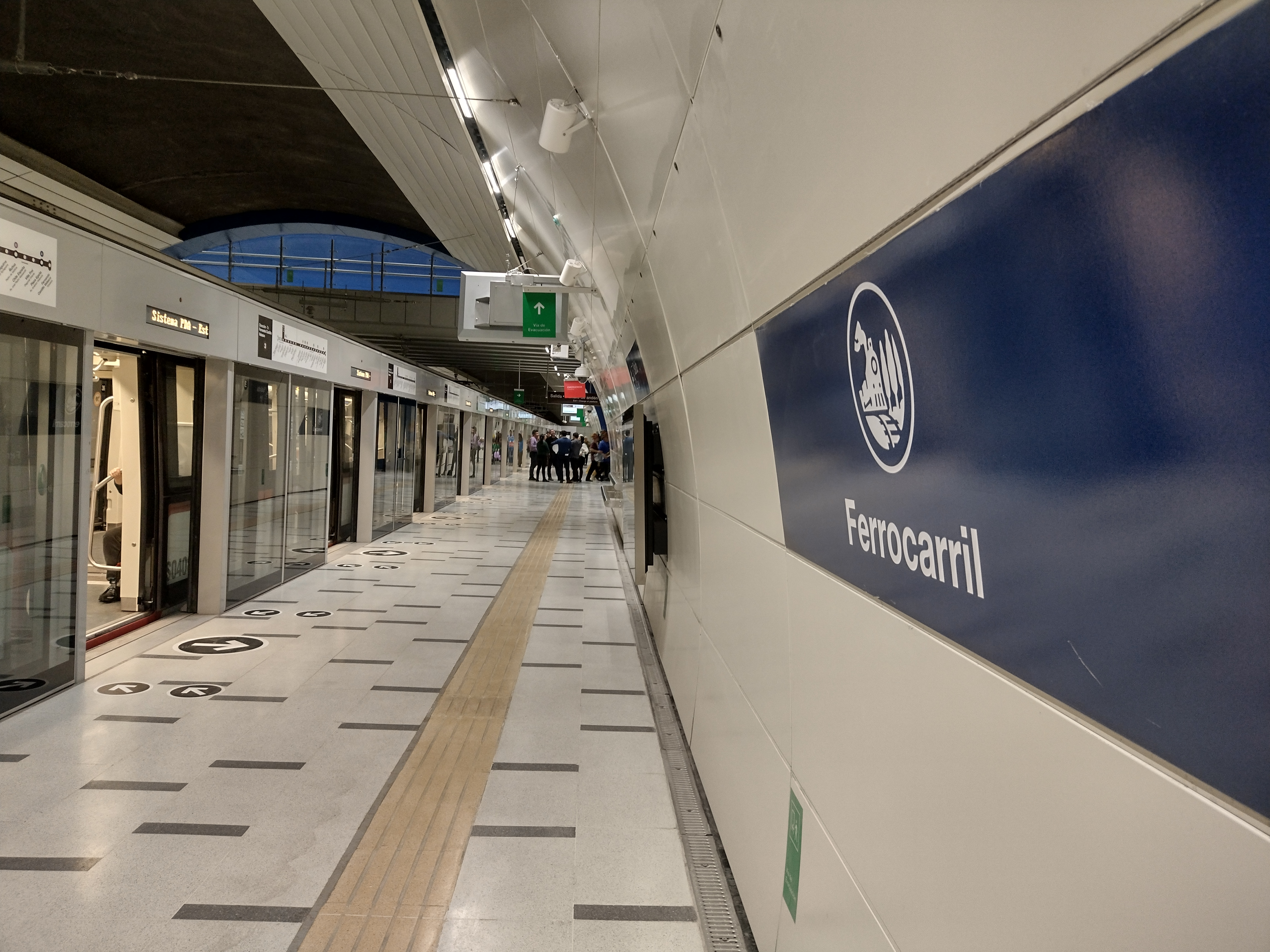

General information
- Location: Manuel Antonio Matta/Pasaje 4
- Coordinates: 33°21′55″S 70°42′19″W
- System: Santiago rapid transit
- Line: Line 3
- Platforms: 2 side platforms
- Tracks: 2
- Connections: Red buses

Construction
- Accessible: yes

History
- Opened: 25 September 2023

Services
Preceding station	Santiago Metro	Following station
Lo Cruzat towards Plaza Quilicura	Line 3	Los Libertadores towards Fernando Castillo Velasco
Location

Ferrocarril is an underground metro station of Line 3 of the Santiago Metro network, in Santiago, Chile. It is an underground, between the Lo Cruzat and Los Libertadores stations on Line 3. It is located at the intersection of Manuel Antonio Matta Avenue with Pasaje 4.

The station was opened on 25 September, 2023 as part of the inaugural section of the extension of Line 3 from Plaza Quilicura to Los Libertadores

== Etymology ==
Its tentative name is due to the fact that it is located near the former Quilicura train station, which during its existence received passenger service. Currently, only garbage transport is received on that land, however, it has been proposed to rebuild the station as part of various commuter rail projects of the State Railway Company.

This project called the Santiago-Batuco Train will be located between the town of the same name and the Quinta Normal Station. Its construction would begin in 2020. The Municipality of Quilicura published information alluding to this project, as well as that of the "Quilicura Nude" at the intersection of Route 5 Norte and Américo Vespucio. Initially called “EFE Quilicura”, the station was officially named “Ferrocarril” on October 15, 2020.

On December 10, 2021, a vote was held in which residents of the Quilicura commune participated, who had to define - from three available options - the pictogram that will identify the station: one of them presents a train next to the old one switch house at the Quilicura station, the other presents a perspective of the railway line flanked by poplars, and the third presents a locomotive passing by a group of trees.
