= Lo Cruzat metro station =

Santiago metro station

Lo Cruzat
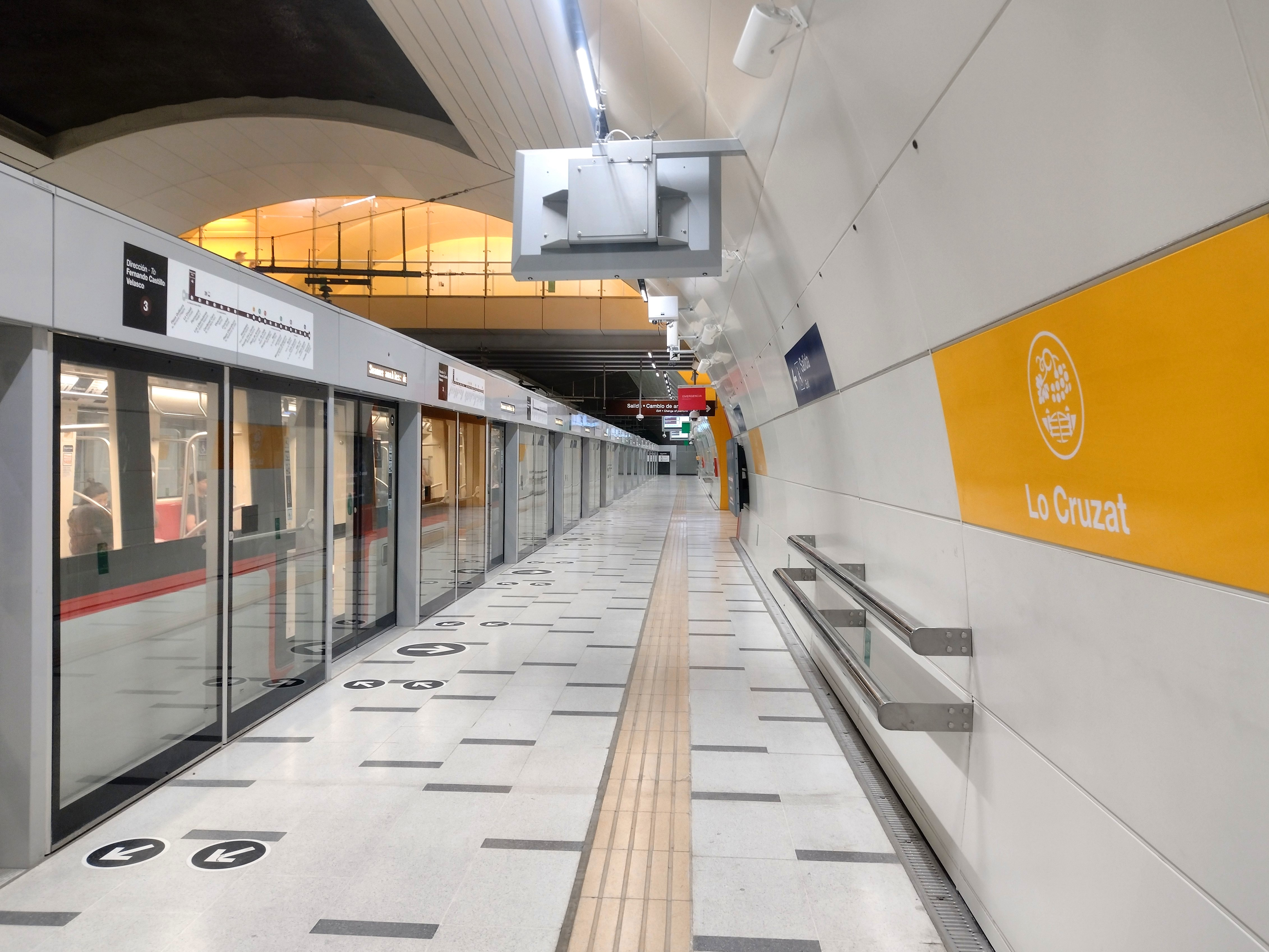

General information
- Location: Manuel Antonio Matta/Las Torres and Lo Cruzat Avenues
- Coordinates: 33°21′55″S 70°42′19″W
- System: Santiago rapid transit
- Line: Line 3
- Platforms: 2 side platforms
- Tracks: 2
- Connections: Red buses

Construction
- Accessible: yes

History
- Opened: 25 September 2023

Services
Preceding station	Santiago Metro	Following station
Plaza Quilicura Terminus	Line 3	Ferrocarril towards Fernando Castillo Velasco
Location

Lo Cruzat is an underground metro station of Line 3 of the Santiago Metro network, in Santiago, Chile. It is an underground, between the Plaza Quilicura and Ferrocarril stations on Line 3. It is located at the intersection of Manuel Antonio Matta Avenue with Las Torres and Lo Cruzat Avenues.

The station was opened on 25 September, 2023 as part of the inaugural section of the extension of Line 3 from Plaza Quilicura to Los Libertadores.

== Etymology ==
The name of the station refers to the corner where the station is located.

Its first name (Las Torres) was due to the location of the station at the intersection of Las Torres Avenue, but because there is already a station with the name Las Torres on Metro Line 4, located on the border between the communes of Peñalolén and Macul, the use of the name Lo Cruzat has been studied, which was officially defined in 2018.

On December 10, 2021, a vote was held in which residents of the Quilicura commune participated, who had to define - from three available options - the pictogram that identifies the station: in the three alternatives grapes appear that represent the ancient vineyards that existed in the sector and the wineries and chicha factories that existed in the Lo Cruzat sector until 2007.
