= Cardenal Caro metro station =

Santiago metro station

Cardenal Caro
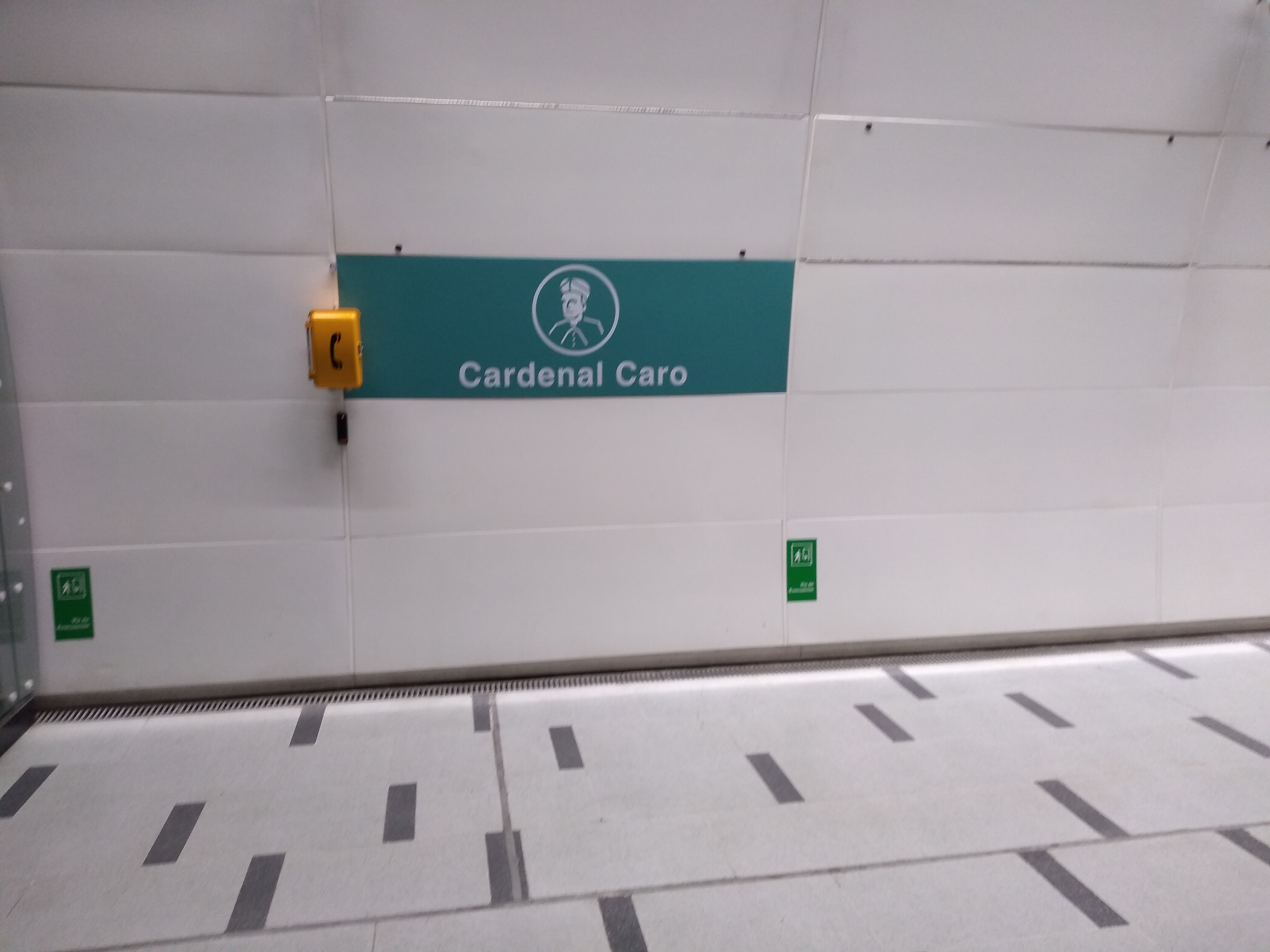

General information
- Location: Independencia Avenue/Cardenal Caro Street
- Coordinates: 33°23′07″S 70°40′46″W
- System: Santiago rapid transit
- Line: Line 3
- Platforms: 2 side platforms
- Tracks: 2
- Connections: Transantiago buses

Construction
- Accessible: yes

History
- Opened: 22 January 2019

Services
Preceding station	Santiago Metro	Following station
Los Libertadores towards Plaza Quilicura	Line 3	Vivaceta towards Fernando Castillo Velasco
Location

Cardenal Caro is an underground metro station of Line 3 of the Santiago Metro network, in Santiago, Chile. It is an underground, between the Los Libertadores and Vivaceta stations on Line 3. It is located at the intersection of Independencia Avenue with Cardenal Caro Street. The station was opened on 22 January 2019 as part of the inaugural section of the line, from Los Libertadores to Fernando Castillo Velasco.

== Etymology ==
The station is located a few meters from Cardenal José María Caro Avenue. The Avenue remembers José María Caro, VIII Archbishop of Santiago de Chile and the first Chilean prelate to be created Cardinal by the Holy See.
