= Plaza Egaña metro station =

Santiago metro station

Plaza Egaña
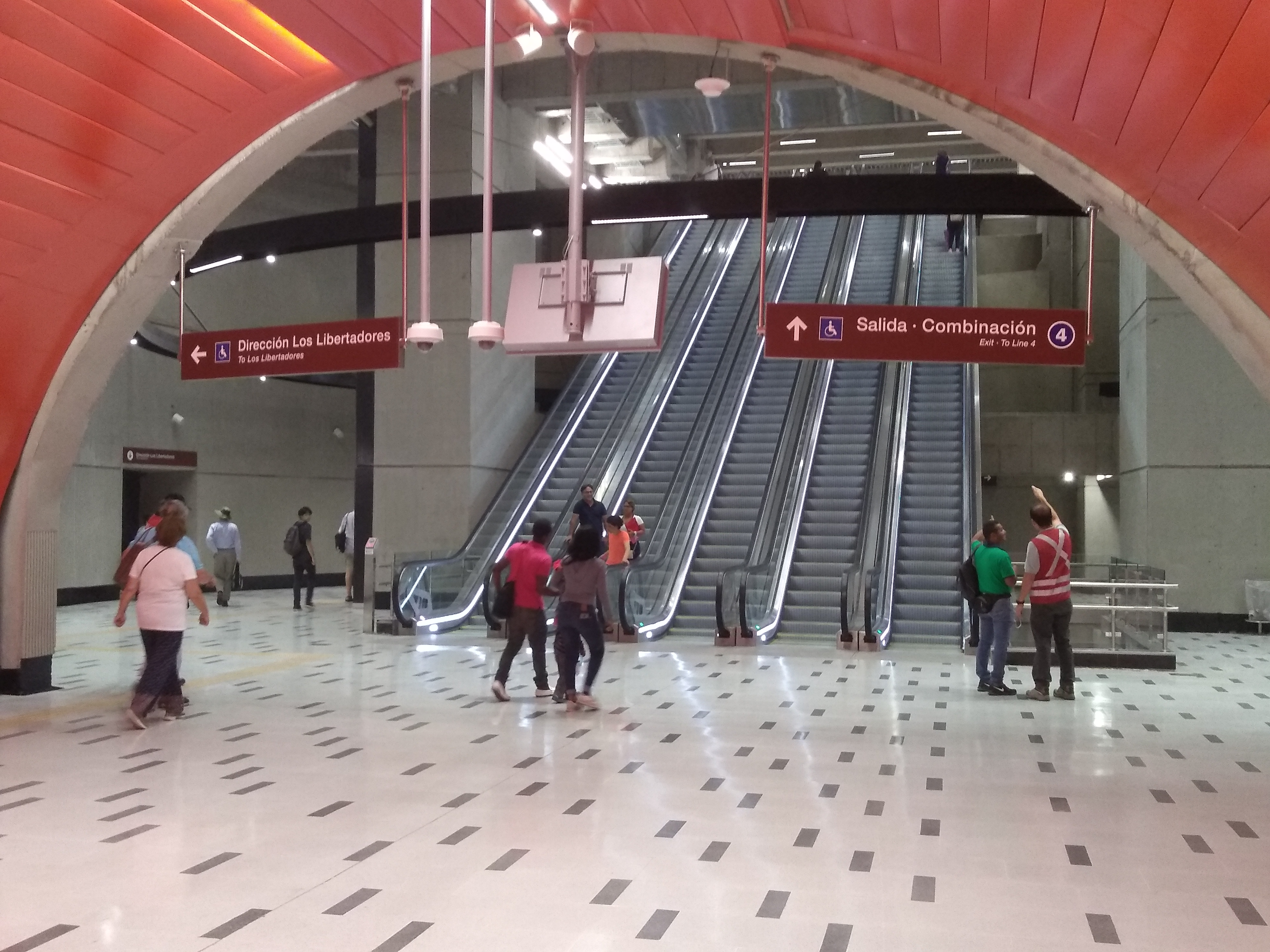
- Combination zone between lines 3 and 4.

General information
- Location: Ossa Avenue / Irarrázaval Avenue
- Coordinates: 33°27′12.28″S 70°34′14.71″W
- System: Santiago rapid transit
- Lines: Line 3 Line 4
- Platforms: 2 side platforms
- Tracks: 2
- Connections: Transantiago buses

Construction
- Accessible: yes

History
- Opened: 30 November 2005; 22 January 2019

Services
Preceding station	Santiago Metro	Following station
Simón Bolívar towards Tobalaba	Line 4	Los Orientales towards Plaza de Puente Alto
Villa Frei towards Plaza Quilicura	Line 3	Fernando Castillo Velasco Terminus
Location

Plaza Egaña is a transfer station between the Line 3 and Line 4 of the Santiago Metro. It is located under Egaña Square. The Line 4 station was opened on 30 November 2005 as part of the inaugural section of the line between Tobalaba and Grecia. The Line 3 station was opened on 22 January 2019 as part of the inaugural section of the line, from Los Libertadores to Fernando Castillo Velasco.

The cross-section of the platform-level tunnel has the shape of two partially intersecting circles, which was so designed due to the predominant presence of clay in the surrounding soil. Support columns of 1.1 m (3 ft 7 in) in diameter separate the tracks from each other. The platforms have 140 m (460 ft) long.
