= Yrarrázaval =

Yrarrázaval is a Chilean surname. Notable people with the surname include:

- Miguel Luis Yrarrázaval (1872 – 30 March 1937) was a Chilean politician
- Eduardo Yrarrázaval (June 1894 – 4 January 1976) was a Chilean politician
- Alfredo Yrarrázaval (6 December 1867 – 26 June 1934) was a Chilean politician
- Rafael Yrarrázaval (born 12 September 1902 – died 4 January 1976) was a Chilean politician
- Manuel José Yrarrázaval Larraín (1834–1896) was a Chilean lawyer and politician
- Arturo Yrarrázaval (1881 – 14 July 1963) was a Chilean politician
- Carlos Yrarrázaval (3 November 1841 – 1920) was a Chilean lawyer
- Sergio Yrarrázaval (died 24 July 1954) was a Chilean politician
- Joaquín Yrarrázaval (24 November 1886 – 23 May 1947) was a Chilean lawyer
- Eugenio Guzmán Yrarrázaval (born 1841) was a Chilean politician
