= Santiago-Batuco commuter rail =

27 km commuter rail line in Santiago, Chilean

Santiago - Batuco commuter rail
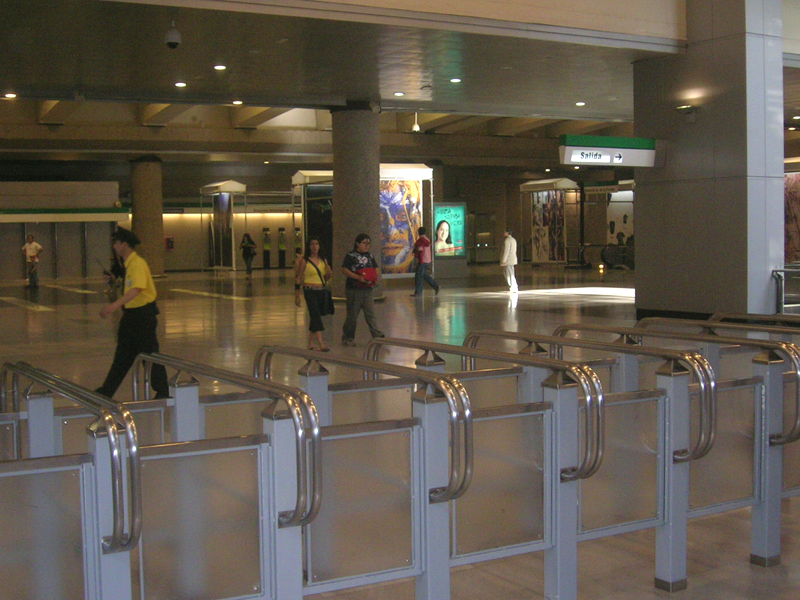
- Future entrance to the Quinta Normal terminus

Overview
- Locale: Santiago
- Termini: Quinta Normal; Estación Batuco
- Stations: 7

Service
- Type: Commuter rail
- Operator: EFE
- Daily ridership: 13 million a year (estimated)

History
- Opened: 2030

Technical
- Line length: 27 km (16.78 mi)
- Operating speed: 120 km/h (75 mph)

The Santiago-Batuco commuter rail is a 27 km (17 mi) commuter rail line under construction in the Chilean capital Santiago, projected to open between 2028 and 2030.

== Background ==
The original Santiago–Valparaíso railway line opened in 1863 via Batuco, and closed to passengers in 1987. In May 2019 Chile's president, Sebastián Piñera announces plans for a commuter rail line running north from Quilicura, on an extension of Santiago Metro Line 3, to Batuco and eventually Tiltil. The Ministry of Transport states that a basic engineering study was completed for the scheme in December 2017. The ministry also stated it was due to respond in July 2019 to an environmental evaluation that commenced at the end of the 2017.

== Stations ==
- Quinta Normal
- Matucana
- Renca
- Quilicura
- Las Industrias
- Valle Grande
- Colina
- Batuco
