= Santiago Metro Line 3 =

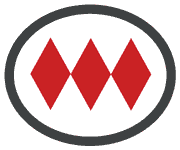

Overview
- Owner: Empresa de Transporte de Pasajeros Metro S.A.
- Termini: Plaza Quilicura (current); Fernando Castillo Velasco
- Stations: 21

Service
- Type: Rapid transit
- System: Santiago Metro, Red Metropolitana de Movilidad
- Operator: Empresa de Transporte de Pasajeros Metro S.A.
- Depot: Near Los Libertadores
- Rolling stock: CAF AS 2014

History
- Opened: 22 January 2019; 7 years ago
- Last extension: 2023

Technical
- Line length: 25 km (16 mi)
- Character: Underground
- Track gauge: 1,435 mm (4 ft 8 1/2 in) standard gauge
- Electrification: 1,500 V DC overhead catenary

Line 3 is a rapid transit line of the Santiago Metro. Traveling from La Reina in the east towards the center, and Quilicura in the North. Its distinctive color on the network line map is chocolate brown.

Line 3 was originally intended to open in the late 1980s, but the 1985 Algarrobo Earthquake hampered its construction, as funds for the line were redirected to reconstruction efforts, and a subsequent urban explosion in Puente Alto and Maipú (in the far southeast and southwest respectively) further put its construction on hold in favor of other lines, until in the early 2010s construction started.

The first phase of the project included 18 stations, which were completed and opened to the public on 22 January 2019 at a cost of US$1.79 billion.

The second phase, composed of a three-station extension towards the northwest that ended at the main square of Quilicura, which was inaugurated on September 25, 2023 with a total project cost of US$378 million.

== History ==
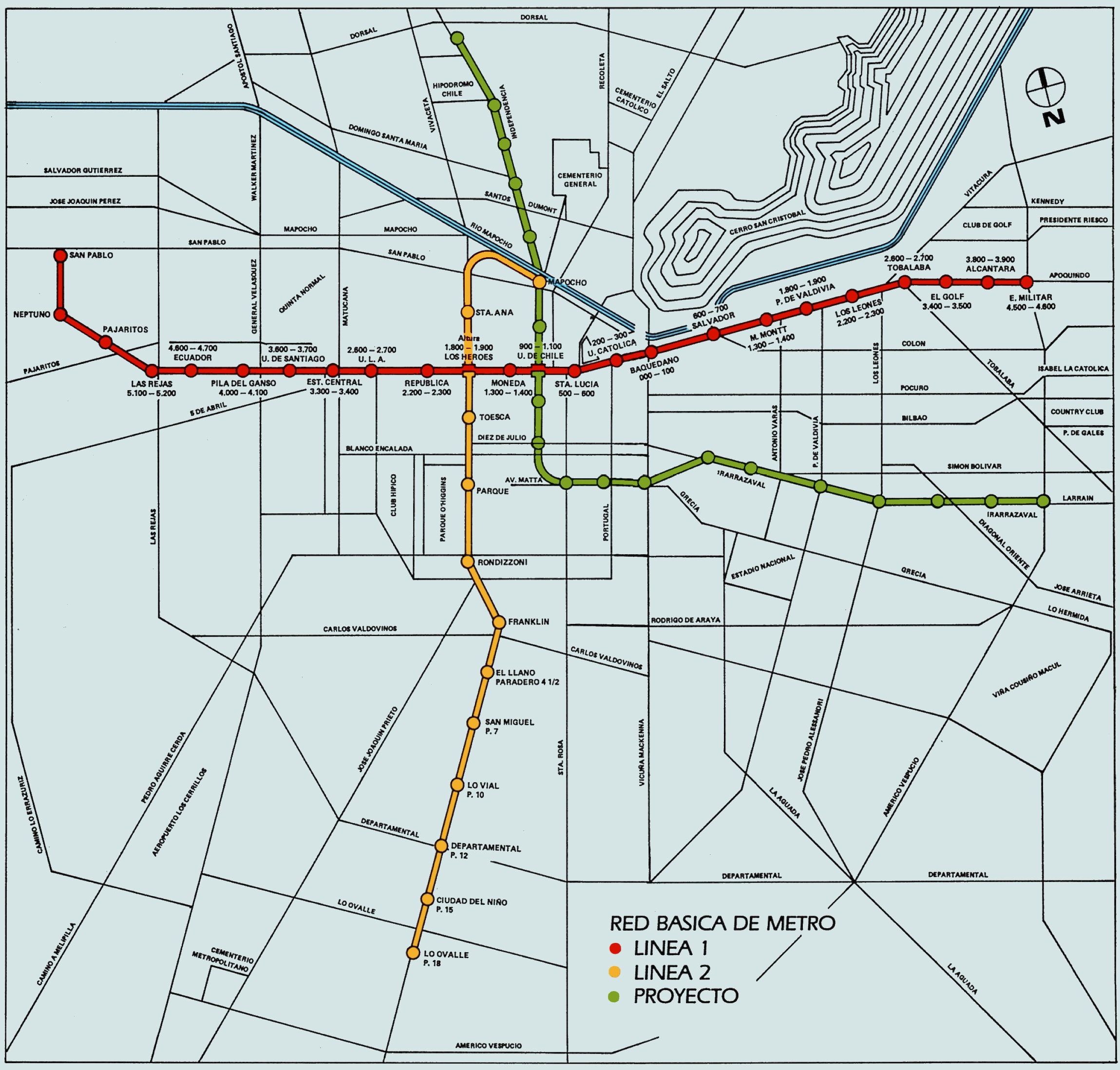
Projected map of Line 3 as planned for 1987

Line 3 was initially planned for construction after Lines 1 and 2 but the 1985 Algarrobo earthquake near Santiago meant work on the new line had to be postponed so that the resources could be used to rebuild the damage caused by the earthquake. In the 1990s, Santiago's transportation needs changed dramatically with a population explosion in the south of the city, especially the communes of La Florida, Chile and Puente Alto, and the plans for Line 3 were postponed again in favour of Line 5, Line 4 and Line 4A in the south.

Despite this, there were pockets of Line 3 works hidden around Santiago, such as the ghost Station under Puente Cal y Canto station, located to the east of the Line 2 side of the station, where works were carried out for years.

In 2010, another new line was announced, Line 6, which once again saw the construction of Line 3 pushed back. Criticism of this delay led finally to the announcement of a new Line 3 construction project by the Chilean government on October 5, 2010. An initial length of track and 18 stations were announced in July 2011.

Line 3 connects with all Santiago Metro lines except for Line 4A. It connects with Line 1 at Universidad de Chile station, with Line 2 and the future Line 7 at Puente Cal y Canto station, with Line 4 at Plaza Egaña station and twice with Line 5 at Plaza de Armas station and Irarrázaval station. It also connects with Line 6 at Ñuñoa station.

On 25 September 2023, a three station 4km extension to the northwest was inaugurated, connecting the Santiago Metro network with Quilicura for the first time. The extension also contemplates Ferrocarril station, which will connect with the future Santiago-Batuco commuter rail

=== Innovations ===
Line 3 complies with high security and passenger comfort standards. The new security measures include cameras inside the trains, an overhead (catenary) electric transmission line, driverless trains, platform screen doors, air conditioning in the trains.

=== October 2019 protests ===
Although Line 3 did not suffer any damage in the October 2019 protests (with the exception of Cardenal Caro, which suffered minor damage), Line 3 was nonetheless closed on the weekend of October 18, 2019, due to security issues. Service on Line 3 was partially resumed on October 23, with full service to all stations being established in 2020.

== Communes served by Line 3 ==
Line 3 serves the following Santiago communes from north to east:

- Quilicura
- Huechuraba (Indirectly)
- Conchalí
- Independencia
- Recoleta (Indirectly)
- Santiago
- Ñuñoa
- La Reina

== Stations ==
Line 3 stations, from west to east, are:

Station	Metro transfer	Address	Opened	Communes	Notes
Plaza Quilicura		Manuel Antonio Matta/Bernardo O'Higgins	25 September 2023	Quilicura	
Lo Cruzat		Manuel Antonio Matta/Lo Cruzat	25 September 2023	Quilicura	
Ferrocarril		Av. Manuel Antonio Matta/Pasaje 4	25 September 2023	Quilicura	
Los Libertadores		Los Libertadores Freeway/San Pedro de Atacama Street	22 January 2019	Quilicura, Huechuraba and Conchalí	
Cardenal Caro		Independencia/José María Caro Avenues	22 January 2019	Conchalí	
Vivaceta		Independencia/Zapadores Avenues	22 January 2019	Conchalí	
Conchalí		Independencia/Dorsal Avenues	22 January 2019	Conchalí	
Plaza Chacabuco		Independencia Avenue/Julio Martínez Street	22 January 2019	Independencia	
Hospitales		Independencia Avenue/Bezanilla Street	22 January 2019	Independencia	
Puente Cal y Canto	Línea 2 del Metro de Santiago	Bandera/General Mackenna Streets	22 January 2019	Santiago	This station will be a transfer with line in 2028 and in 2032
Plaza de Armas	Santiago Metro Line 5	Bandera/Catedral Streets	22 January 2019	Santiago	
Universidad de Chile	Santiago Metro Line 1	San Diego Street/Bernardo O'Higgins Avenue	22 January 2019	Santiago	
Parque Almagro		San Diego Street/Santa Isabel Avenue	22 January 2019	Santiago	
Matta		Matta/Santa Rosa Avenues	22 January 2019	Santiago	This station will be a transfer with line in 2032
Irarrázaval	Santiago Metro Line 5	Grecia/General Bustamante Avenues	22 January 2019	Ñuñoa	
Monseñor Eyzaguirre		Irarrázaval/Manuel Montt Avenues	22 January 2019	Ñuñoa	
Ñuñoa	Santiago Metro Line 6	Irarrázaval/Pedro de Valdivia Avenues	22 January 2019	Ñuñoa	
Chile España		Irarrázaval/Chile España Avenues	22 January 2019	Ñuñoa	This station will be a transfer with line in 2030
Villa Frei		Irarrázaval/Ramón Cruz Avenues	22 January 2019	Ñuñoa	
Plaza Egaña	Santiago Metro Line 4	Irarrázaval/Ossa Avenues	22 January 2019	Ñuñoa, La Reina	
Fernando Castillo Velasco		Larraín/Tobalaba Avenues	22 January 2019	La Reina	

== Line 3 data sheet ==
- Communes:
  - Quilicura
  - Conchalí
  - Independencia
  - Santiago
  - Ñuñoa
  - La Reina
- Track:
  - Manuel Antonio Matta Avenue (Quilicura): 3 stations
  - Américo Vespucio Avenue: 1 station
  - Independencia Avenue: 6 stations
  - Bandera Avenue: 2 station
  - San Diego Avenue: 1 stations
  - Manuel Antonio Matta Avenue (Santiago): 1 station
  - Irarrázaval Avenue: 6 stations
  - Larraín Avenue: 1 stations
- Construction Method:
  - Underground
- Opening Dates:
  - 2019 (Los Libertadores - Fernando Castillo Velasco)
  - 2023 (Los Libertadores - Plaza de Quilicura)
- Rolling stock: CAF-Thales AS-2014

== See also ==
- List of metro systems
- Rail transport in Chile
- Red Metropolitana de Movilidad
