= Iglesia del Monasterio del Carmen Bajo de San Rafael =

National monument of Chile

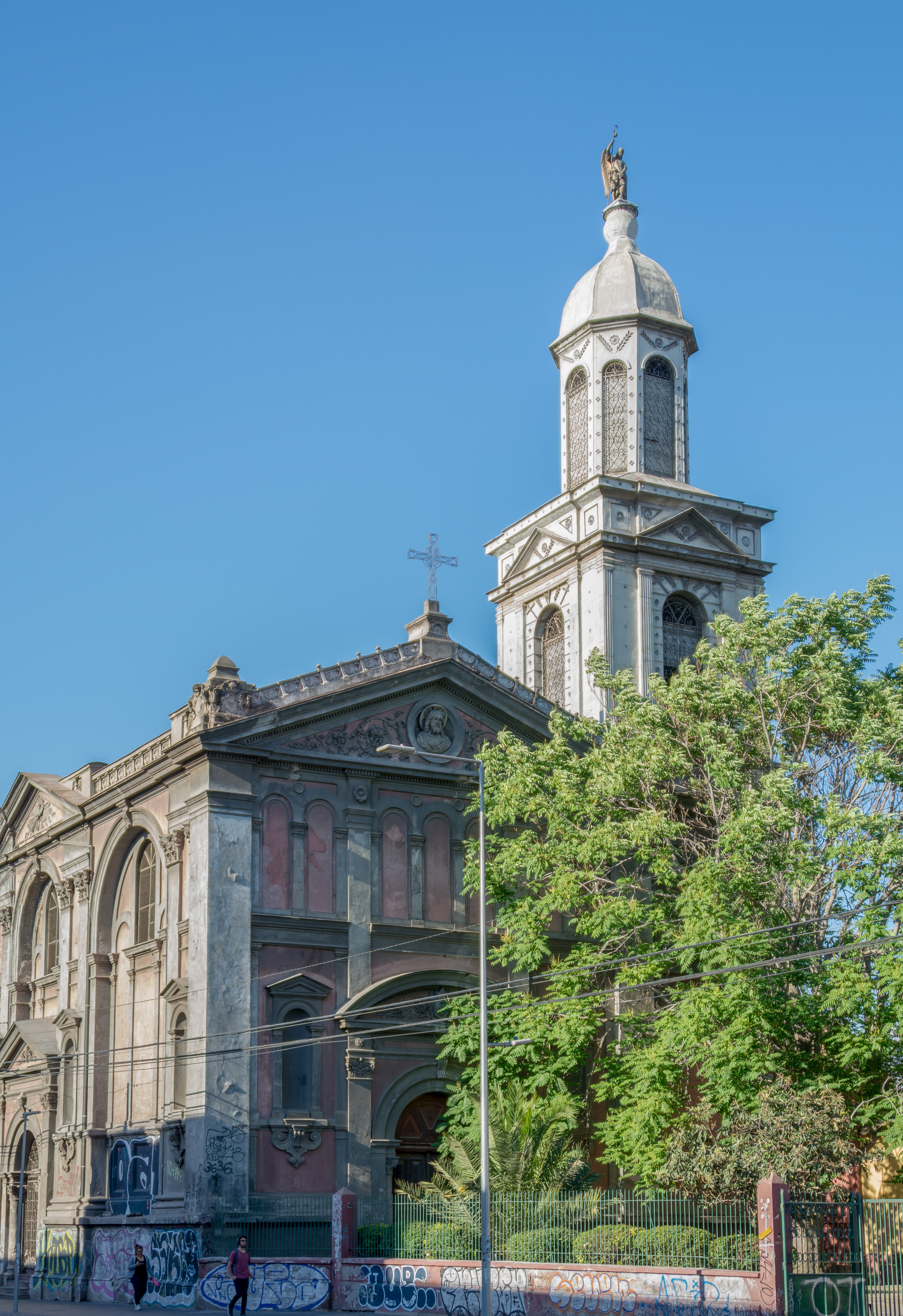

Religion
- Affiliation: Roman Catholic

Location
- Municipality: Independencia
- Country: Chile
- Interactive map of Iglesia del Monasterio del Carmen Bajo de San Rafael
- Coordinates: 33°25′45″S 70°39′12″W

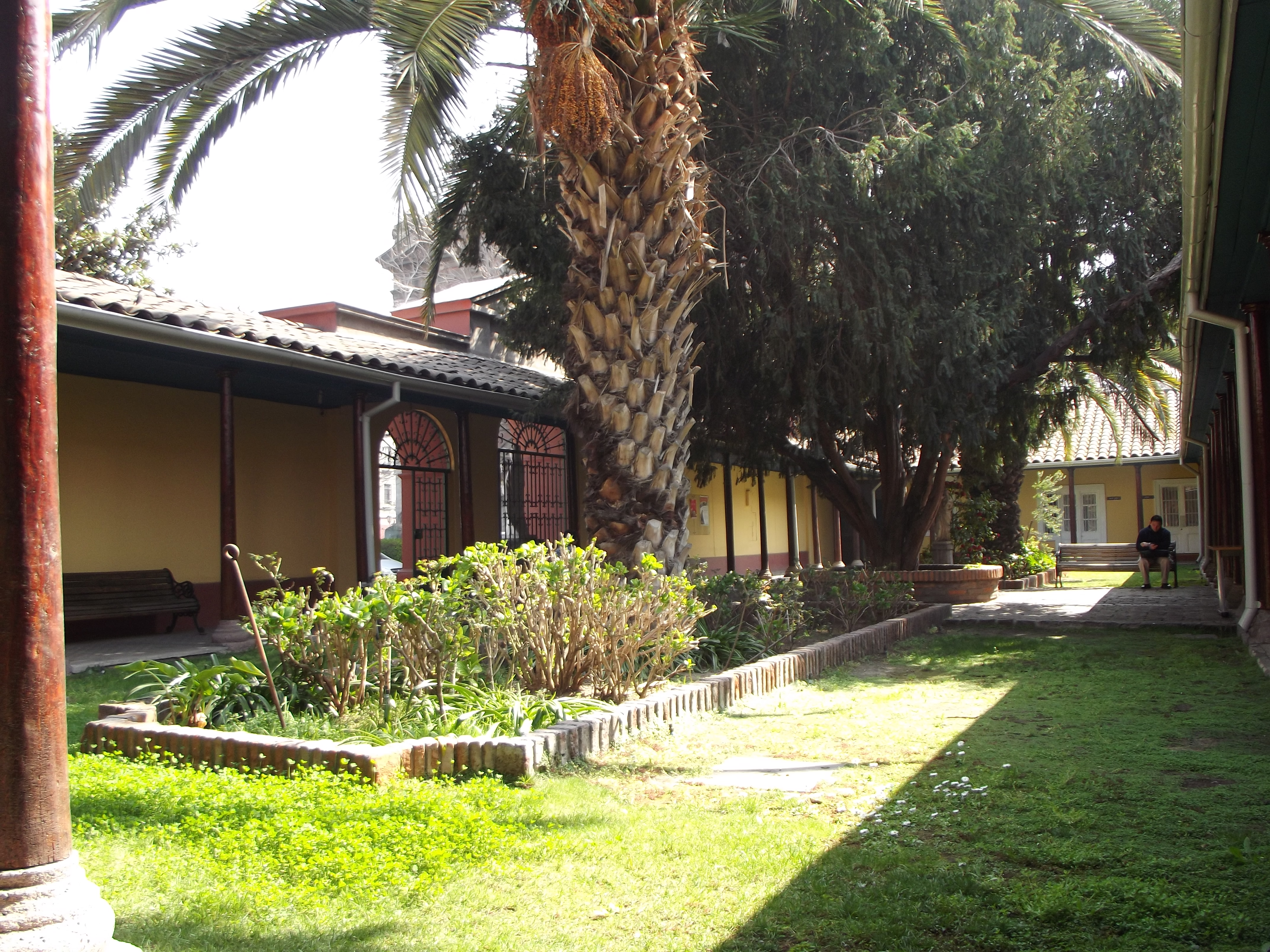
View of the cloister.

The Iglesia del Monasterio del Carmen Bajo de San Rafael is a Catholic church located on Independencia Avenue, in the district of Independencia of the city of Santiago, Chile. It was founded as a monastery in 1770 and operated as such until 1958. Since 1985 it has been the seat for the Vicaría Episcopal Zona Norte of the Archdiocese of Santiago. The church, along with the surviving buildings of the former monastery, was declared a National Monument of Chile on 24 November 1983, within the category of Historic Monuments.

== History ==
On 30 January 1762 the corregidor of Santiago Luis Manuel de Zañartu sent a petition to King Charles III of Spain requesting the construction of a monastery in the city for the Discalced Carmelites. It was granted by a Royal Decree in July 1766. The site chose for the monastery was located in La Cañadilla neighborhood, north of the Mapocho River.

Construction of the first buildings began in 1767 and finished in 1770. The church began to be built in 1774 under the supervision of Marcelino de la Peña and Juan Solís. It was inaugurated on 24 October 1777 by the corregidor Zañartu and members of the Real Audiencia.

A flood caused by the overflow of the Mapocho River in 1783 damaged the foundations of the church building, which forced the nuns to leave the building, being temporarily accommodated in a house owned by the Dominicans, close to the Recoleta Dominica. In 1870 architect Fermín Vivaceta remodeled the church, installing a statue of Raphael on the tower of the church.

The monastery operated until 20 February 1958, when the nuns of the congregation relocated themselves to La Reina. The old church building was neglected until 1985, when it was altered to serve as the seat for the Vicaría Episcopal Zona Norte of the Archdiocese of Santiago, after having undergone deterioration for many years, being even misused as a warehouse for the Vega Central.

== Description ==
The church is parallel to Independencia Avenue, and consists of a rectangular block with a single tower on its southeast corner. There is a partially fenced atrium in front of the main facade.

The cloister is colonial in style with intersecting wings creating various patios. The walls are of adobe, and the roof, which is in part supported by slender posts, is covered with Spanish colonial roof tiles.

The church is neoclassical in style with various slightly-projecting facade elements including Corinthian order pilasters and columns, archivolt, and a curved pediment topping the front entrance.

The upper stages of the tower have a wood structure lined with stamped iron sheets, while the rest is of brick. The tower is topped by a statue of St. Raphael the archangel.
