= Cervecería Ebner =

National monument of Chile

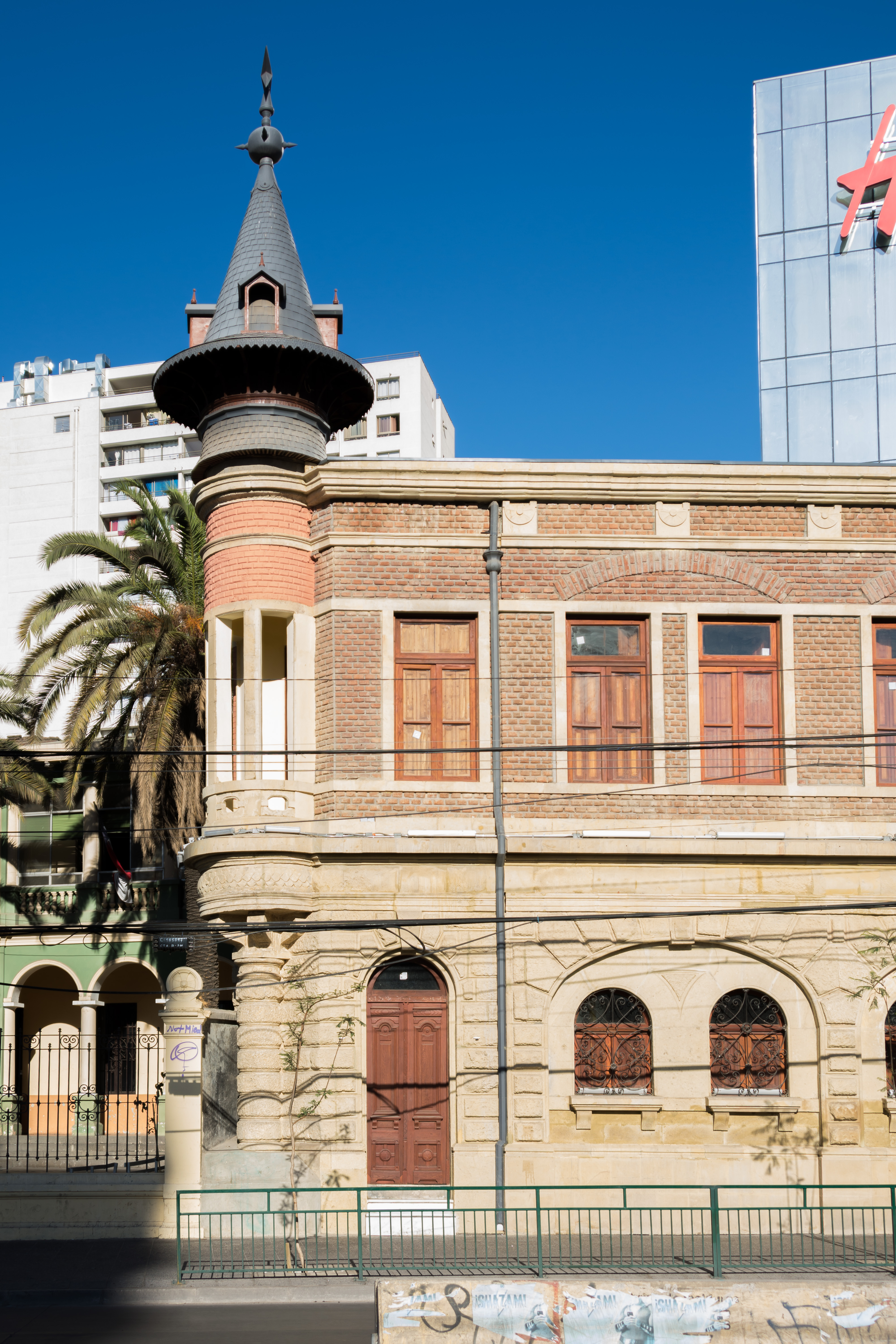
- Interactive map of the Cervecería Ebner area

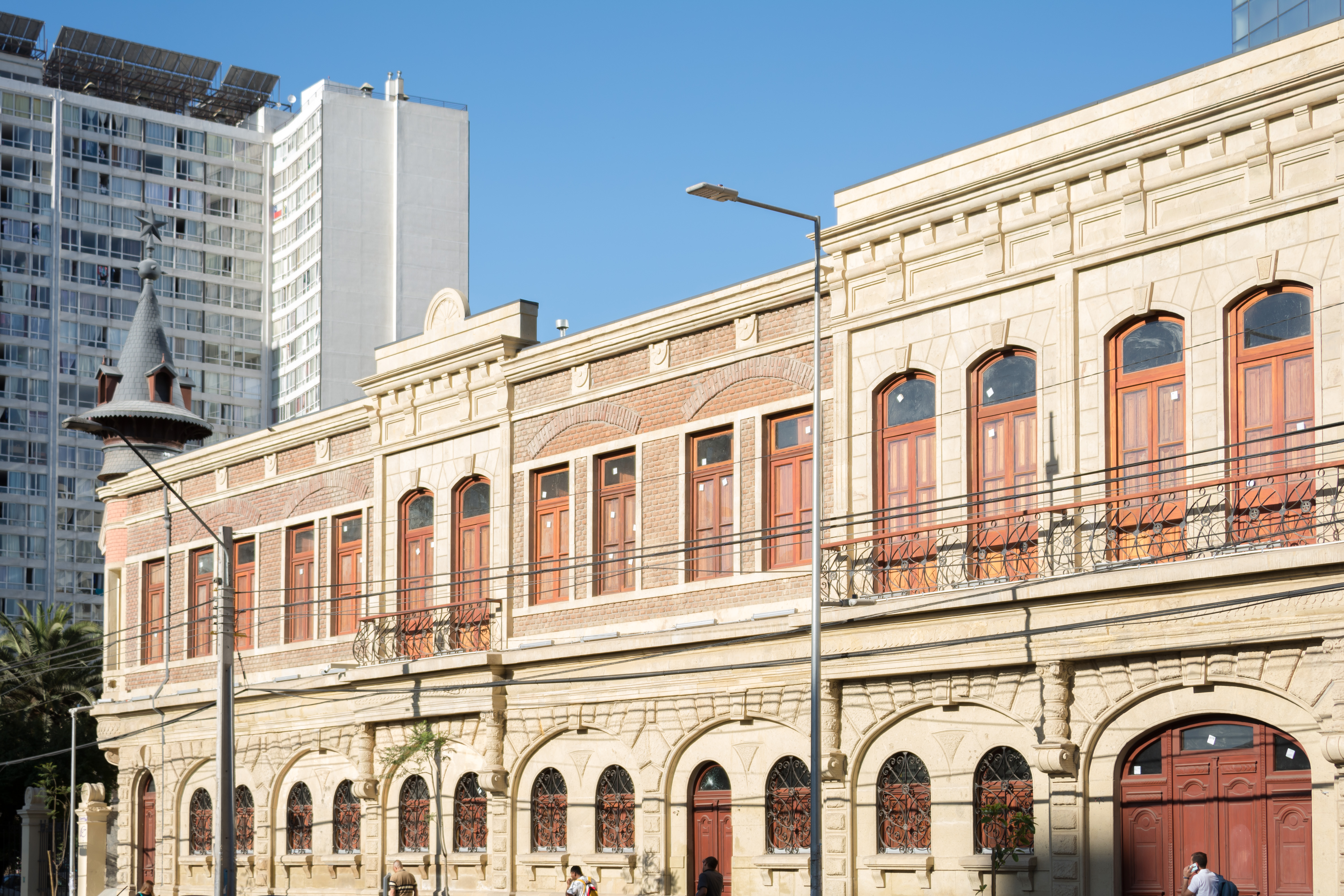
A view from Avenida Independencia.

The Cervecería Ebner is a former brewery on Independencia Avenue, in the district of Independencia, in Santiago de Chile. It was founded by the German Andrés Ebner, and operated until 1978. In 1888, the German businessman built his home on the brewery land, which, along with the interior yard, an antique barley grain dryer and the wall-fence, was declared as a National Monument of Chile on October 26, 1984, within the category of Historic Monuments.

== History ==
Andrés Ebner was born in Bavaria, Germany in 1850, moving to Peru in 1868, and a year after to Chile, where he, along with his partner Otto Schleyer, founded a brewery in Talca in 1870. With the money earned in Talca, he acquired in 1878 the brewery owned by Salvador Koch, located in La Cañadilla (former name of Independencia Avenue), in Santiago.

In 1879, Ebner installed equipment to begin to operate the brewery under his own name, bringing machinery from Talca and importing some items. In 1880, he acquired the factory La Estrella, a producer of Malta, relocating the plant to his brewery land. The pilsner Ebner was produced in the brewery, promoted as the best beer in Chile, as well as the nationally famous soft drink Bilz, the first Chilean soft drink created in 1905, which was launched in a gala event held at the Municipal Theatre of Santiago. The factory was also the first to manufacture ice, reaching a production of 50,000 kilograms per day.

Between 1885 and 1888, Ebner built his home on the same site as the brewery. The first floor was used as offices, while the second served as his residence. Its architect is unknown, but the building was probably designed by German architect Adolf Möller. According to the Möller family archive, Adolf Möller emigrated to Chile in late 1889, and returned to Germany in 1910.

Andrés Ebner died in 1908 with the industry in full swing.

In 1916 the factory was sold by the heirs of Ebner to the Compañía de Cervecerías Unidas, and continued operating under the same brand name until 1978, when it closed, being abandoned and finally dismantled between 1981 and 1982.

In 1986 the property was acquired by the businessman Luis Echavarri, who proposed a project to convert the old factory into a focal point for gastronomy and commerce, with a modern boulevard, a shopping center and a beer museum —the first in Santiago—. Mall Barrio Independencia was opened in September 2018.

== Description ==
The former house of Andrés Ebner consists of a main elongated section that is parallel to Independencia Avenue, between Olivos and Echeverría streets, and a diagonal wing at the southern end. The two-story building housed offices on the first floor and the apartment of the German businessman on the second floor.

Built in Renaissance Revival and Second French Empire styles, the building features a rusticated front facade that has twin semicircular-arch windows set in arched recesses on the ground floor. The facade of the diagonal wing features columns and balustered balconies. There is a turret on the northern corner of the building.
