= Parque Bustamante metro station =

Santiago metro station

Parque Bustamante
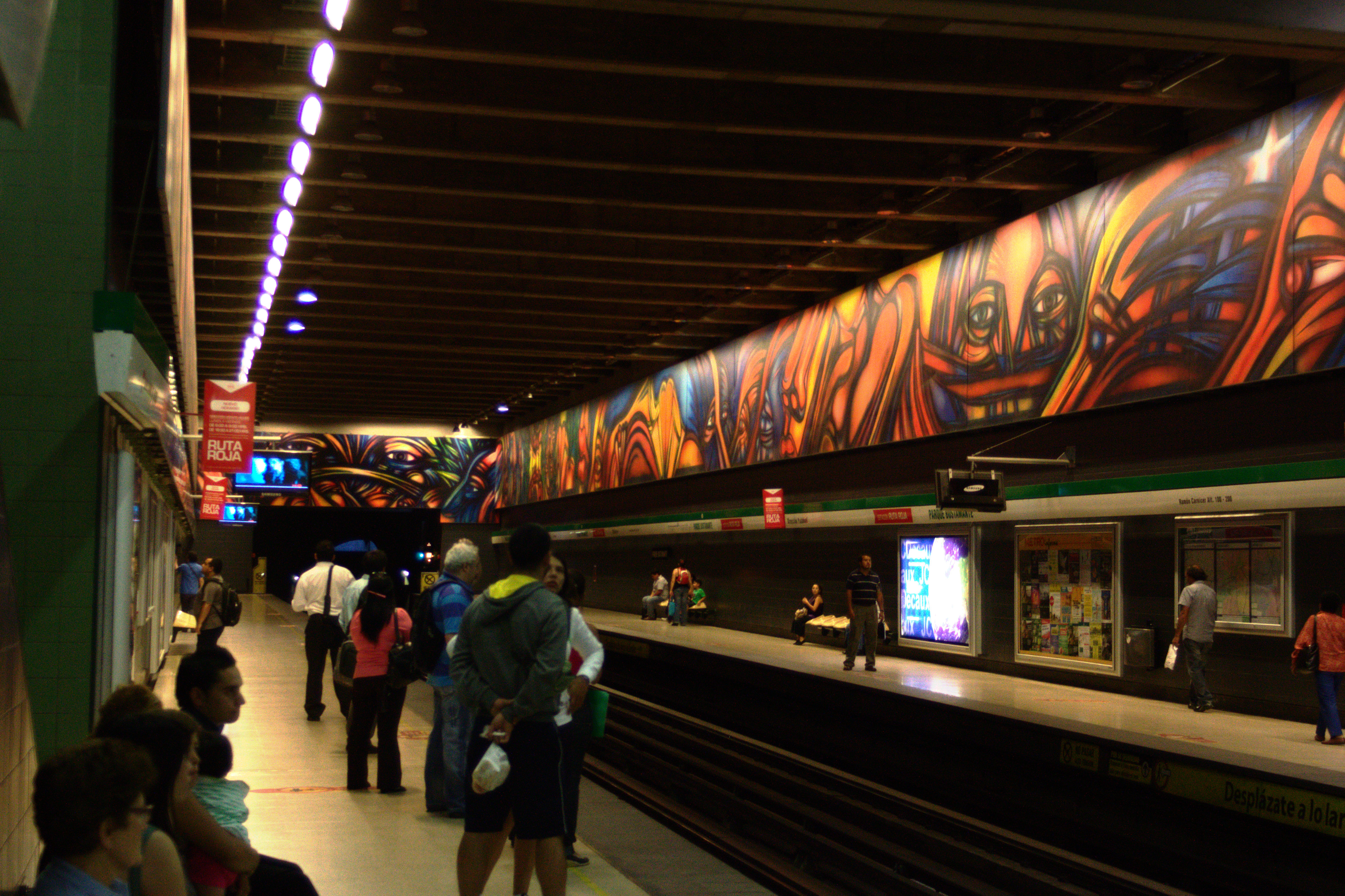

General information
- Location: Ramón Carnicer Street / Francisco Bilbao Avenue
- Coordinates: 33°26′33.98″S 70°37′53.40″W
- System: Santiago rapid transit
- Line: Line 5
- Platforms: 2 side platforms
- Tracks: 2
- Connections: Transantiago buses

Construction
- Accessible: yes

History
- Opened: April 5, 1997

Services
Preceding station	Santiago Metro	Following station
Baquedano towards Plaza de Maipú	Line 5	Santa Isabel towards Vicente Valdés
Location

Parque Bustamante is an underground metro station on Line 5 of the Santiago Metro, in Santiago, Chile. It is located beneath Parque Bustamante, which gives the name to the station. The station was opened on 5 April 1997 as part of the inaugural section of the line, from Baquedano to Bellavista de La Florida.

Initially, the platform side walls featured mosaics vaguely designed to resemble trees. That decoration was disguised by the mural-like artwork Vida y Trabajo, which was completed in 2008. Another artwork installed here is named El Sitio de las Cosas by Pablo Rivera, which is made of polyester resin coated with an applied copper patina.
