= Santa Isabel metro station =

Santiago metro station

Santa Isabel
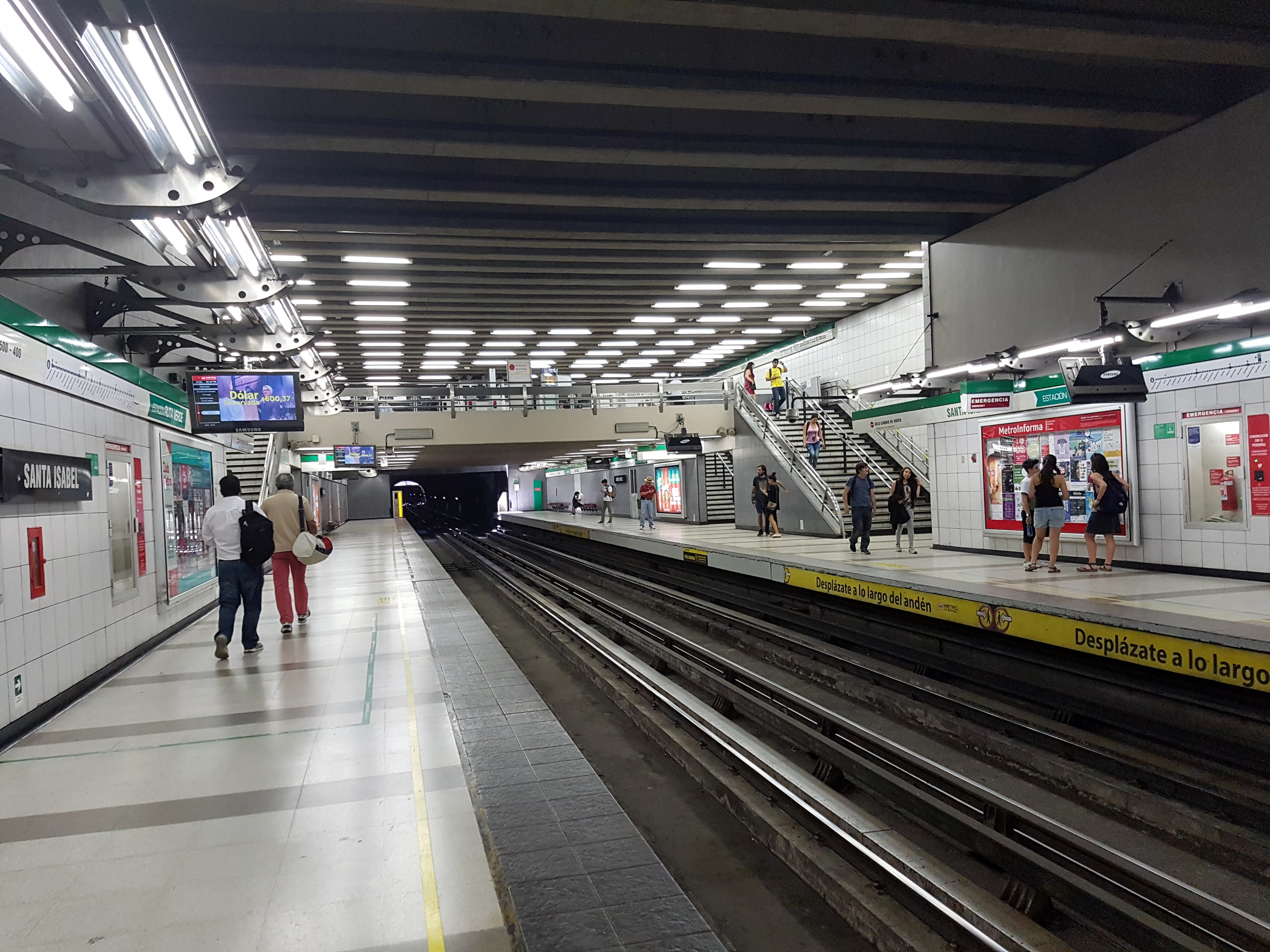
- Santa Isabel metro station

General information
- Location: General Bustamante Avenue / Santa Isabel Avenue
- Coordinates: 33°26′49.47″S 70°37′49.62″W
- System: Santiago rapid transit
- Line: Line 5
- Platforms: 2 side platforms
- Tracks: 2
- Connections: Transantiago buses

Construction
- Accessible: yes

History
- Opened: April 5, 1997

Services
Preceding station	Santiago Metro	Following station
Parque Bustamante towards Plaza de Maipú	Line 5	Irarrázaval towards Vicente Valdés
Location

Santa Isabel is a metro station on Line 5 of the Santiago Metro, in Santiago, Chile. It takes its name from its location beneath the intersection of Avenida General Bustamante with Avenida Santa Isabel, the intersection that delineates the communes of Providencia, Ñuñoa and Santiago. The station is located underground, between the stations Parque Bustamante to the north and Irarrázaval to the south. The station was opened on 5 April 1997 as part of the inaugural section of the line, from Baquedano to Bellavista de La Florida.

Access to Santa Isabel metro station is via Santa Isabel Avenue, at its east and west intersection with General Bustamante Avenue. The station also has disability access.
