= Manuel José Yrarrázaval Larraín =

Chilean politician (1834–1896)

Manuel José Yrarrázaval
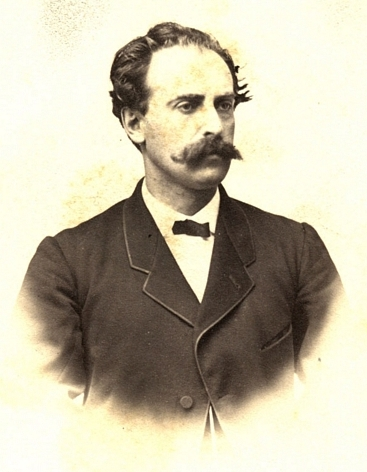

Minister of the Interior, Industry and Public Works
- In office 3 September 1891 – 31 December 1891
- President: Jorge Montt
- Preceded by: Julio Bañados
- Succeeded by: Eduardo Matte

Member of the Senate of Chile
- In office 1894–1896
- Constituency: Santiago
- In office 1888–1894
- Constituency: Talca
- In office 1873–1882
- Constituency: Santiago

Member of the Chamber of Deputies
- In office 1870–1873
- Constituency: Santiago
- In office 1867–1870
- Constituency: Illapel
- In office 1864–1867
- Constituency: Santiago
- In office 1861–1864
- Constituency: La Ligua

Personal details
- Born: 7 November 1834 Santiago, Chile
- Died: 14 February 1896 (aged 61) New York City, United States
- Party: Conservative Party
- Spouse(s): Julia Mackenna Astorga; Isabel Correa Toro
- Parent(s): José Miguel Irarrázaval Alcalde; Trinidad Larraín Gandarillas
- Profession: Farmer

Manuel José Yrarrázaval Larraín (7 November 1834 – 14 February 1896) was a Chilean farmer and politician who served several terms as a member of the Chamber of Deputies of Chile and the Senate of Chile, as well as Minister of the Interior, Industry and Public Works under Jorge Montt.

A prominent member of the Conservative Party, he also served as a councillor of state and as president of the Bank of Valparaíso.

== Early life ==
Yrarrázaval was born in Santiago on 7 November 1834 to José Miguel Irarrázaval Alcalde and Trinidad Larraín Gandarillas. He married Julia Mackenna Astorga in 1861, with whom he had one child, and later Isabel Correa Toro in 1865, with whom he had seven children.

He studied at the Colegio de los Sagrados Corazones and the Instituto Nacional, and later pursued legal studies at Georgetown University in Washington, D.C., the University of Leuven in Belgium and in Denmark. After travelling extensively in Europe and the Middle East, he returned to Chile around 1860 or 1861 and devoted himself to agricultural activities.

== Political career ==
A member and longtime leader of the Conservative Party, Yrarrázaval was elected municipal councillor of Santiago in 1861. That year, he entered the Chamber of Deputies as representative for La Ligua. He subsequently represented Santiago from 1864 to 1867, Illapel from 1867 to 1870 and Santiago again from 1870 to 1873.

Yrarrázaval was elected senator for Santiago in 1873 and reelected in 1876, serving until 1882. After a period outside Congress, he returned as senator for Talca for the 1888–1894 term. In January 1891, during the 1891 Chilean Civil War, he signed the congressional act deposing President José Manuel Balmaceda.

During the conflict, Yrarrázaval served as Minister of the Interior, Industry and Public Works of the Congressional government's Junta of Iquique from May to August 1891, and also briefly served as acting Minister of Finance. Following the Congressional victory, he resumed the Interior portfolio in Santiago from 3 September to 31 December 1891.

Yrarrázaval was elected senator for Santiago for the 1894–1900 term. He took his seat on 11 June 1894 but died before completing the term, being succeeded in the Senate by Ventura Blanco Encalada.

Yrarrázaval died in New York City on 14 February 1896, aged 61.
