= Los Libertadores metro station =

Santiago metro station

Los Libertadores
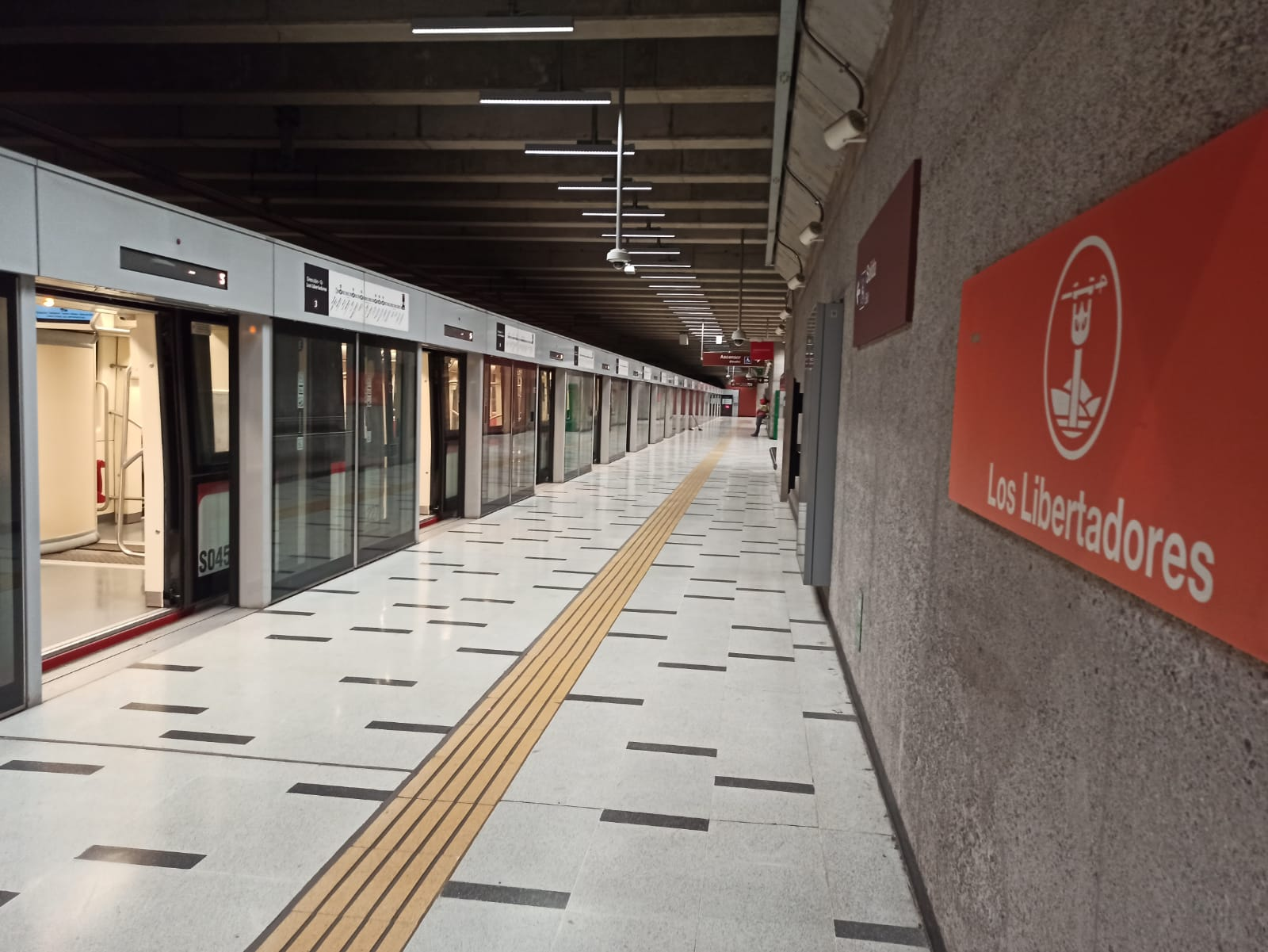

General information
- Location: Américo Vespucio Norte/Los Libertadores Highway
- Coordinates: 33°21′56″S 70°41′26″W
- System: Santiago rapid transit
- Line: Line 3
- Platforms: 2 side platforms
- Tracks: 2
- Connections: Transantiago buses

Construction
- Accessible: yes

History
- Opened: 22 January 2019

Services
Preceding station	Santiago Metro	Following station
Ferrocarril towards Plaza Quilicura	Line 3	Cardenal Caro towards Fernando Castillo Velasco
Location

Los Libertadores is an underground metro station of Line 3 of the Santiago Metro network, in Santiago, Chile. It is an underground, between the Ferrocarril and Cardenal Caro stations on Line 3. At the time of its inauguration, it was the terminal station of Line 3 on the north. It is located at the intersection of Los Libertadores Highway with Américo Vespucio Norte Avenue.

The station was opened on 22 January 2019 as part of the inaugural section of the line, from Los Libertadores to Fernando Castillo Velasco.

== Etymology ==
The name of the station refers to the Los Libertadores Highway, which is adjacent to the station. Initially it was called "Huechuraba".

The pictogram of the station is a representation of the Monument to the Victory of Chacabuco, which refers to the Battle of Chacabuco, which marked the end of the Reconquest and began the definitive independence of the country.
