= Fernando Castillo Velasco metro station =

Santiago metro station

Fdo. Castillo Velasco
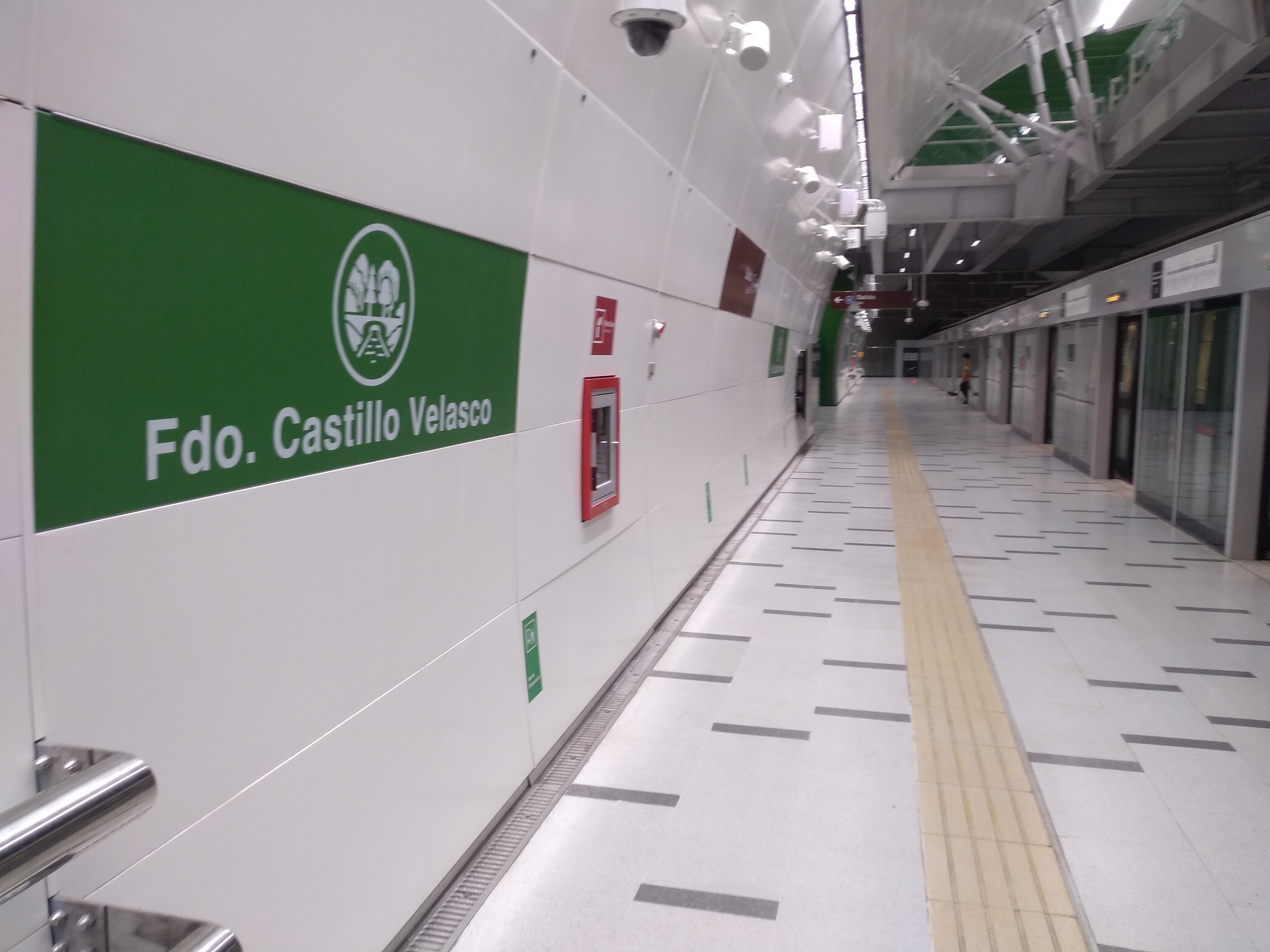

General information
- Location: Alcalde Fernando Castillo Velasco Avenue / Loreley Street
- Coordinates: 33°27′09″S 70°33′29″W
- System: Santiago rapid transit
- Line: Line 3
- Platforms: 2 side platforms
- Tracks: 2
- Connections: Transantiago buses

Construction
- Accessible: yes

History
- Opened: 22 January 2019

Services
Preceding station	Santiago Metro	Following station
Plaza Egaña towards Plaza Quilicura	Line 3	Terminus
Location

Fernando Castillo Velasco is an underground metro station and the southern terminal station of Line 3 of the Santiago Metro network, in Santiago, Chile. It is located underground, at the intersection of Alcalde Fernando Castillo Velasco Avenue with Loreley Street. It the current terminal station of Line 3, preceded by the Plaza Egaña station. Construction of the 6.5 km tunnel between Irarrázaval and Fernando Castillo Velasco was completed in 2017 on a budget of 145 million euro. The station was opened on 22 January 2019 as part of the inaugural section of the line, from Los Libertadores to Fernando Castillo Velasco.

== Etymology ==
The name is in tribute to the former mayor of La Reina Fernando Castillo Velasco, who died in 2013.

When the station was still under design, the names of "Tobalaba Sur" and "La Reina" were shuffled. When the construction of Line 3 was confirmed in 2012 by President Sebastián Piñera, it became official as "Estación Larraín" due to the name of the avenue where it is located. However, on July 19, 2014, President Michelle Bachelet formalized the name change to the stretch of Avenida Larraín de La Reina to Fernando Castillo Velasco, as well as the change of name to this station for the deceased mayor.
