= Plaza Quilicura metro station =

Santiago metro station

Plaza Quilicura
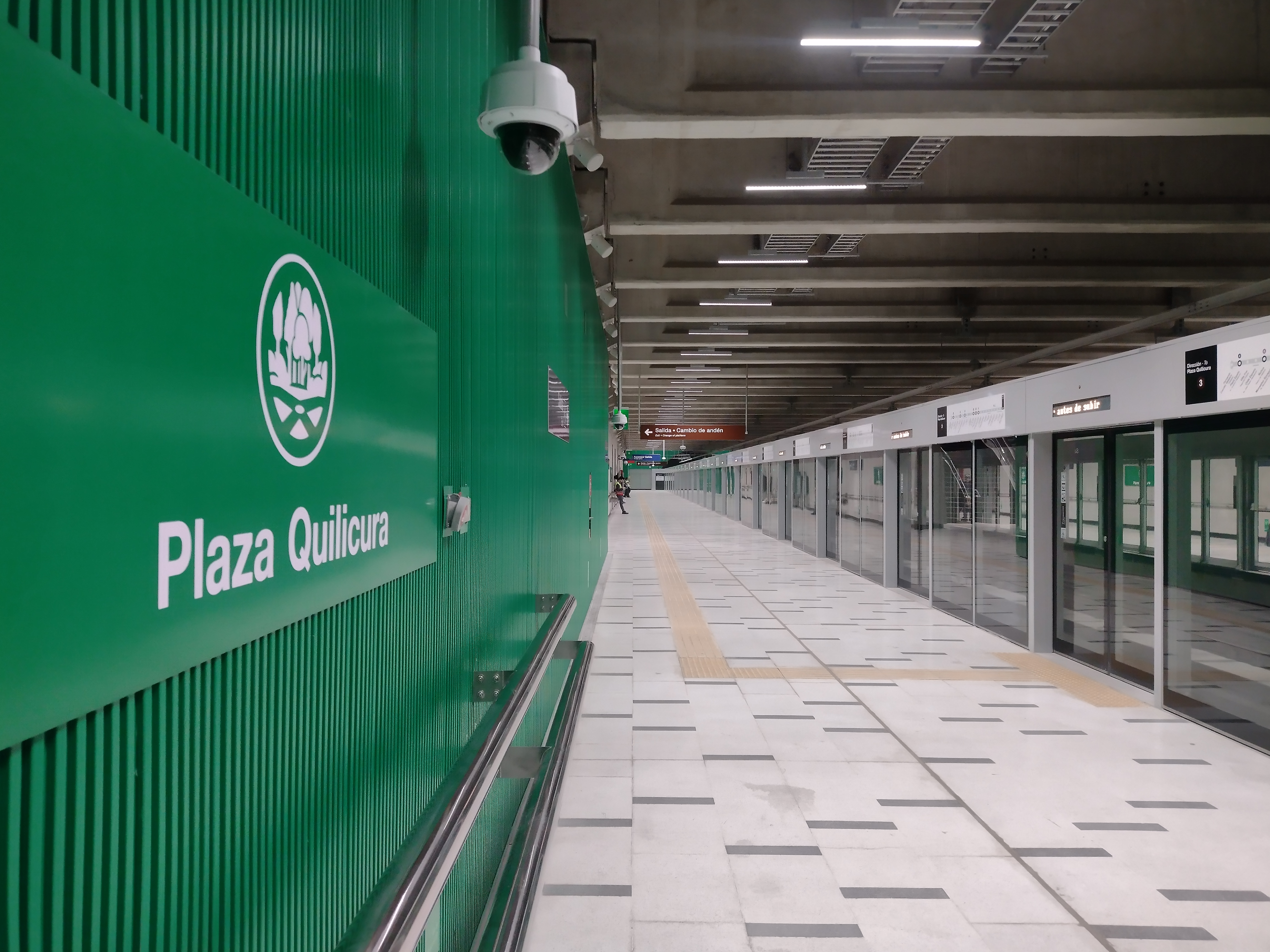

General information
- Location: Manuel Antonio Matta/Bernardo O'Higgins Avenues
- Coordinates: 33°21′57″S 70°43′44″W
- System: Santiago rapid transit
- Line: Line 3
- Platforms: 2 side platforms
- Tracks: 2
- Connections: Red buses

Construction
- Accessible: yes

History
- Opened: 25 September 2023

Services
Preceding station	Santiago Metro	Following station
Terminus	Line 3	Lo Cruzat towards Fernando Castillo Velasco
Location

Plaza Quilicura is an underground metro station and the northern terminal of Line 3 of the Santiago Metro network, in Santiago, Chile. It is located underground and is preceded by Lo Cruzat station on Line 3. The station sits at the intersection of Manuel Antonio Matta Avenue and Bernardo O'Higgins Avenue.

The station was opened on 25 September 2023 as part of the inaugural section of the Line 3 extension from Plaza Quilicura to Los Libertadores.

== Etymology ==
Its name comes from its located near the Plaza de Armas of Quilicura.

On December 10, 2021, a vote was held in which residents of the commune participated to choose, from three available options, the pictogram that would identify the station. Two of the options featured a work of indigenous pottery, referencing the archaeological finds uncovered during the station’s construction, that correspond to the Aconcagua and Inca cultures; the recovered objects were delivered to the National Museum of Natural History. The third option, which won, represents a view of the commune's Plaza de Armas.
