= Valparaíso =

Second largest city in Chile

- City and commune
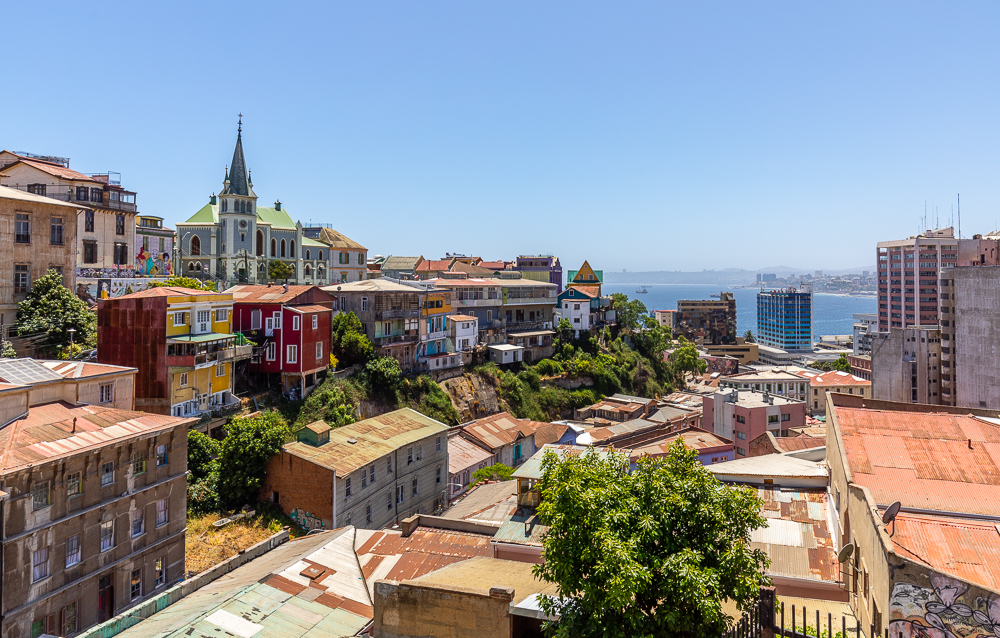
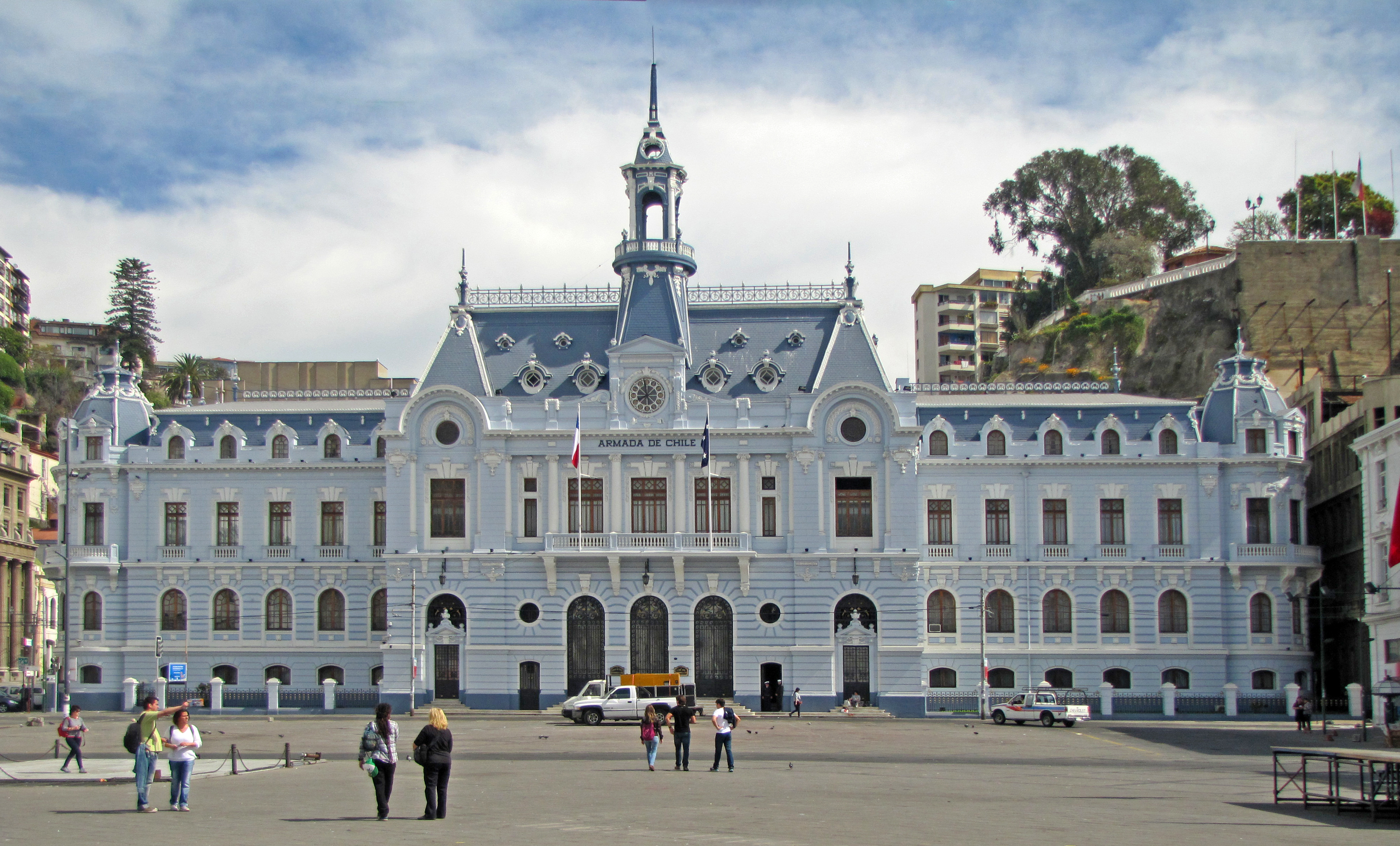
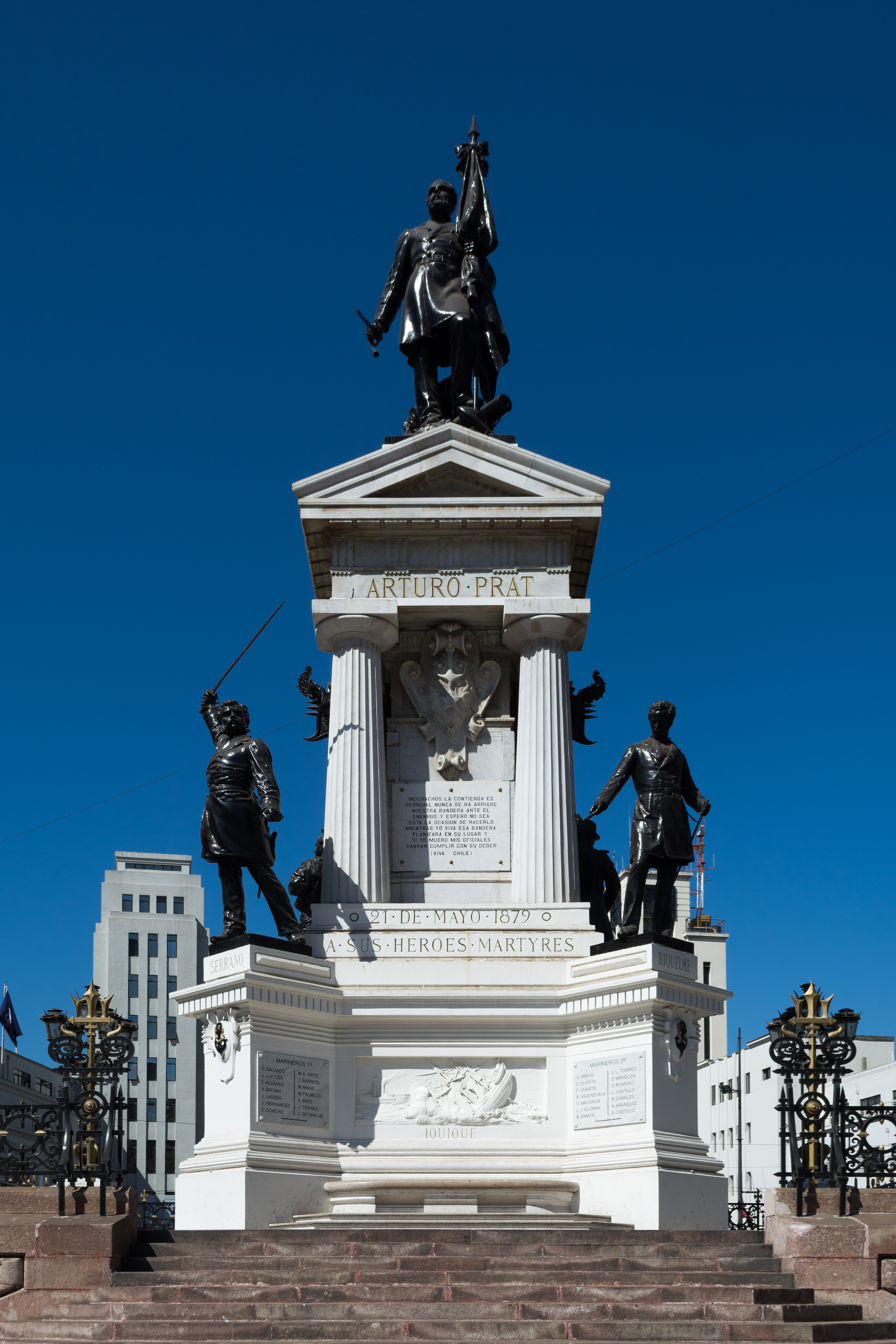
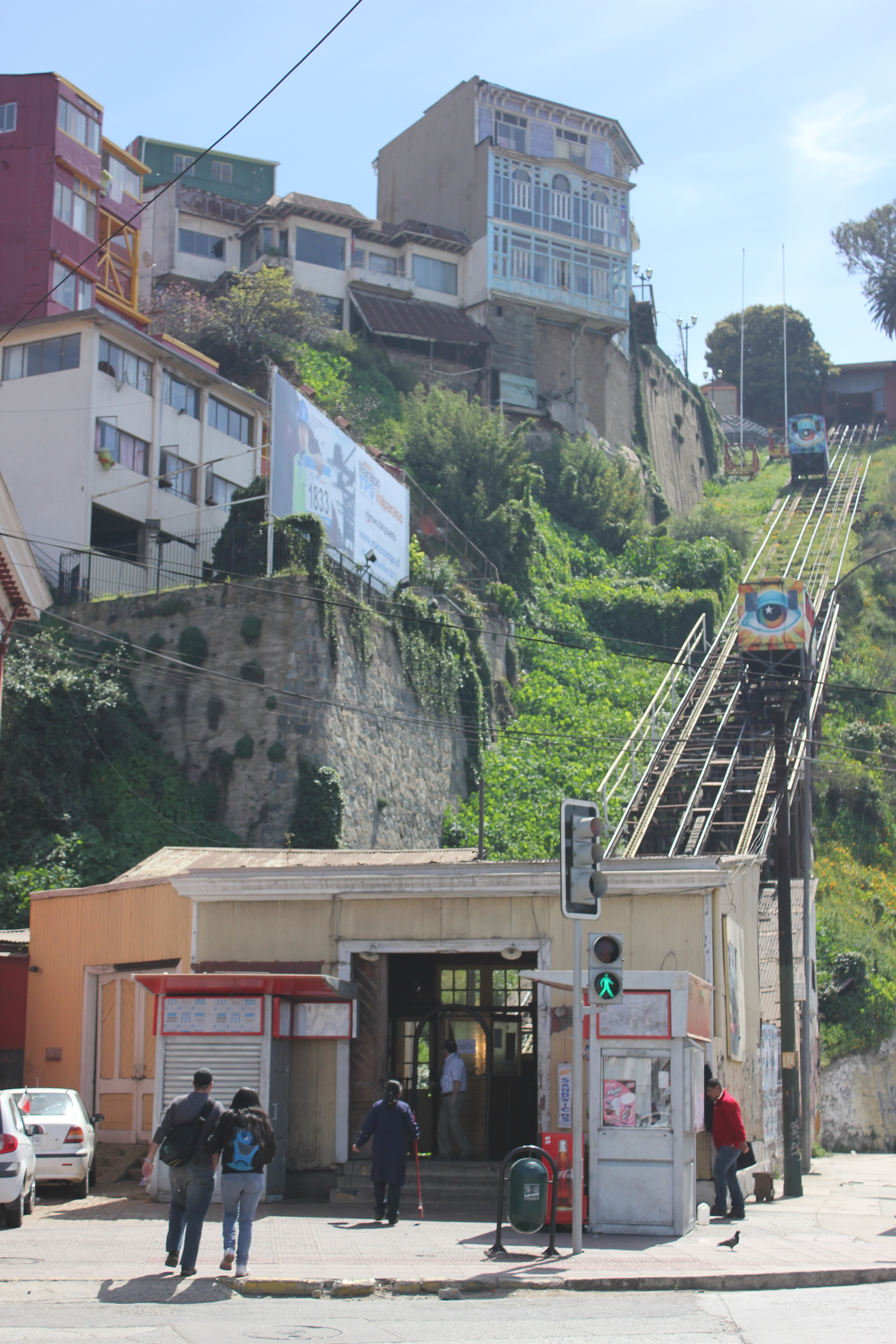
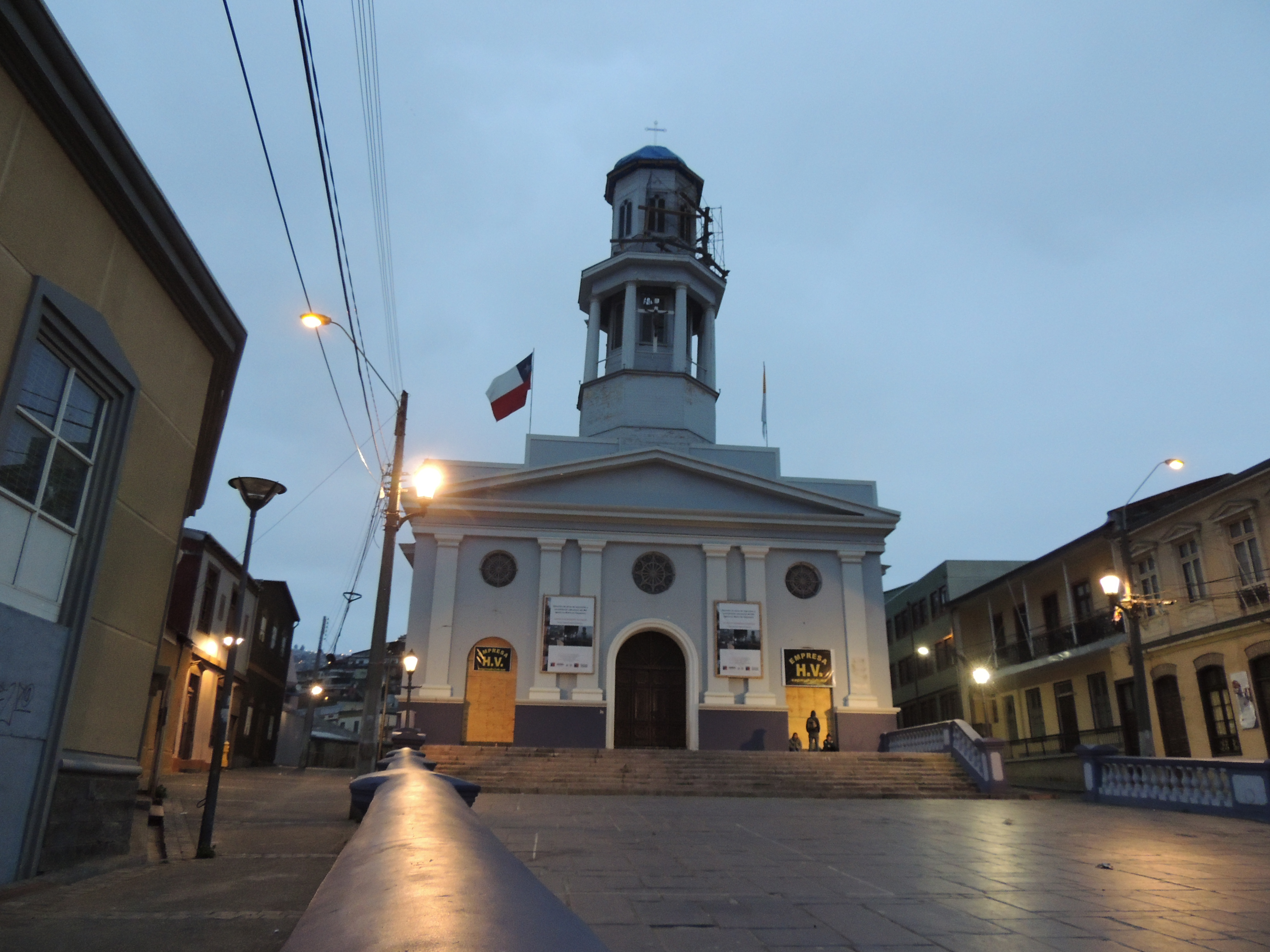
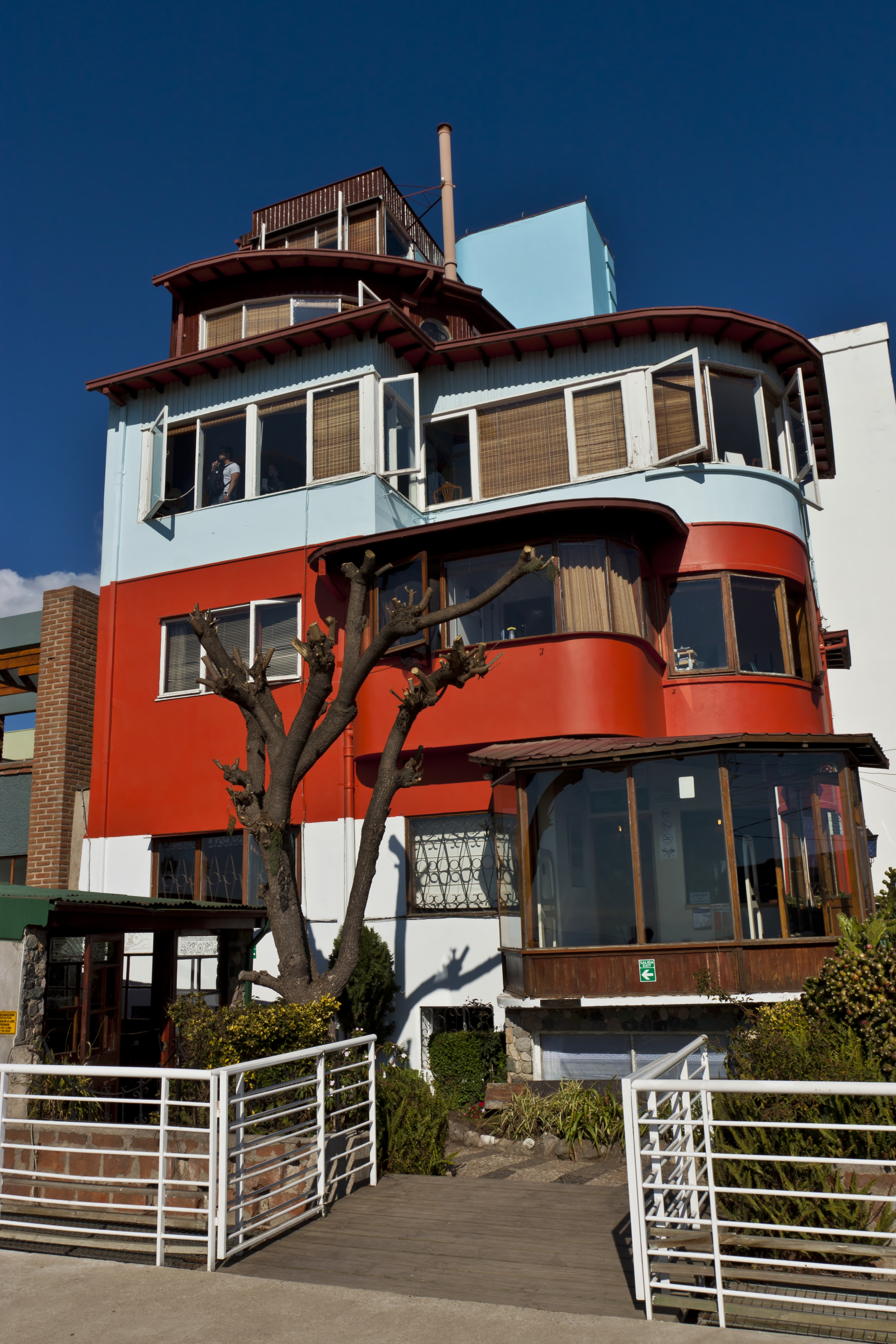
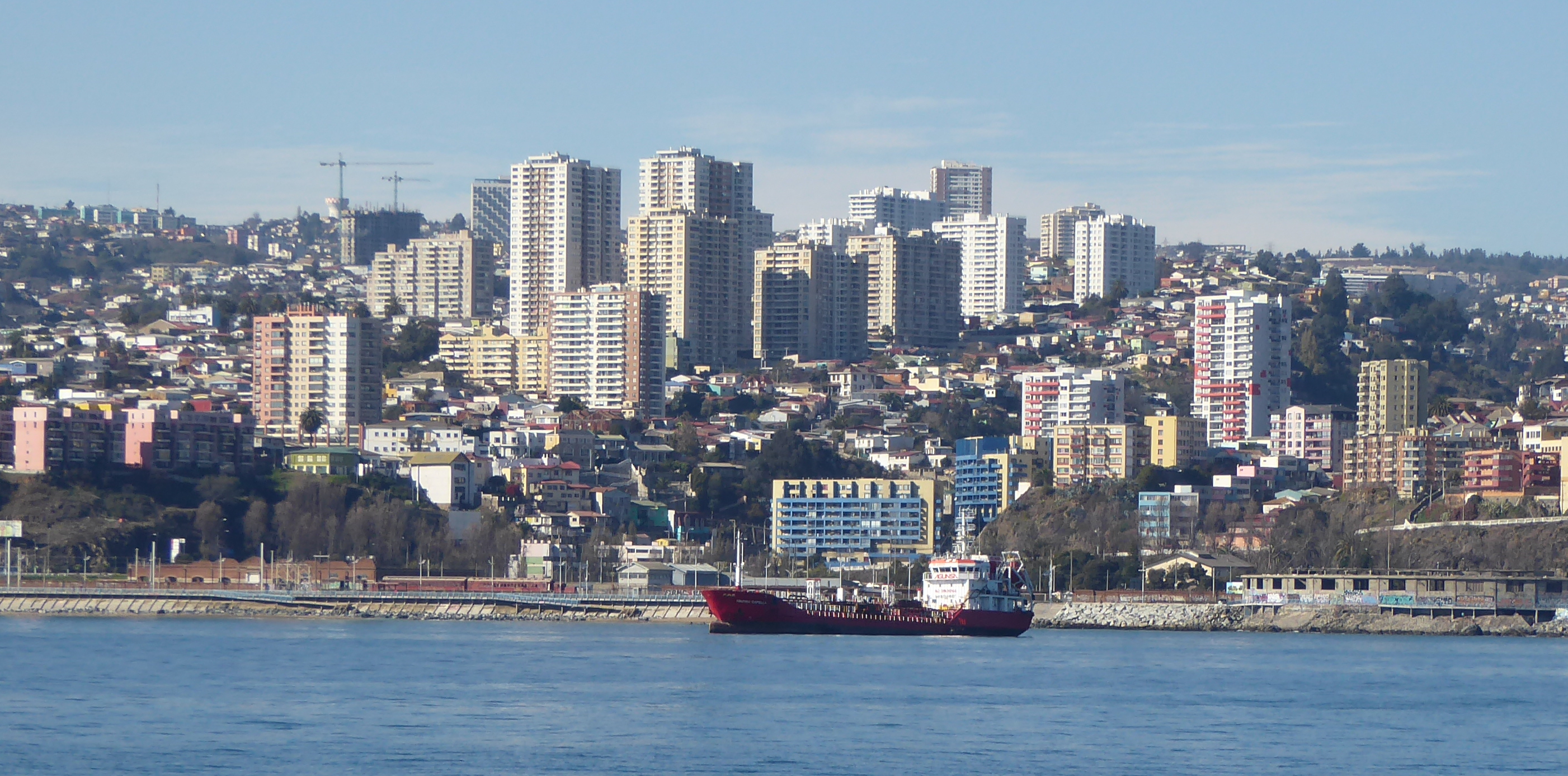
- The historic quarter with the Lutheran Church on the left Edificio Armada de Chile Iquique Heroes Monument Artillería funicular Matriz Church La Sebastiana Cityscape as seen from the sea

- Flag Coat of arms Location in Valparaíso Region Location in Chile
- Nicknames: The Jewel of the Pacific, Valpo
- Coordinates: 33°02′46″S 71°37′11″W
- Country: Chile
- Region: Valparaíso Region
- Province: Valparaíso
- Founded: 1536
- Named for: Valparaíso de Arriba, Spain
- Capital: Valparaíso

Government
  - Type: Municipality
  - Mayor: Camila Nieto (FA)

Area
  - Commune: 401.6 km^{2} (155.1 sq mi)
- Elevation: 10 m (33 ft)

Population (2024)
  - Commune: 284,938
  - Rank: 10th
  - Density: 709.5/km^{2} (1,838/sq mi)
  - Urban (2nd): 952,000
  - Metro (3rd): 1,032,140
- Demonym(s): Porteño (m), Porteña (f) valpino, -a

GDP (PPP, constant 2015 values)
  - Year: 2023
  - Total (Metro): $28.7 billion
  - Per capita: $28,500
- Time zone: UTC−4 (CLT)
  - Summer (DST): UTC−3 (CLST)
- Area code: (country) 56 + (city) 32
- Climate: Csb
- Website: municipalidaddevalparaiso.cl$\in$

UNESCO World Heritage Site
- Official name: Historic Quarter of the Seaport City of Valparaíso
- Criteria: Cultural: (iii)
- Reference: 959
- Inscription: 2003 (27th Session)
- Area: 23.2 ha (57 acres)

Valparaíso (Note: English: /ˌvælpəˈreɪsoʊ/ VAL-pə-RAY-soh, /ˌvælpəˈreɪzoʊ/ VAL-pə-RAY-zoh, /ˌvælpəˈraɪsoʊ/ VAL-pə-RY-soh or /ˌvælpəˈraɪzoʊ/ VAL-pə-RY-zoh, Spanish: [balpaɾaˈiso]. Literally 'Paradise Valley'.) is a major city, commune, seaport, and naval base facility in the Valparaíso Region of Chile. Valparaíso was originally named after Valparaíso de Arriba, in Castile-La Mancha, Spain. With a population of 284,938, it is the 10th-largest commune in Chile.

Greater Valparaíso is the second-most populous metro area in the country. Valparaiso is the second-largest city in the metro area (behind Viña del Mar). It is located about 120 km (75 mi) northwest of Santiago, by road, and is one of the Pacific Ocean's most important seaports. Valparaíso is the capital of Chile's second most-populated administrative region and has been the Chilean Navy headquarters since 1817, as well as being the seat of the National Congress of Chile since 1990.

Valparaíso played an important geopolitical role in the second half of the 19th century when it served as a major stopover for ships traveling between the Atlantic and Pacific oceans via the Straits of Magellan. The area experienced rapid growth during its golden age as a magnet for European immigrants, when the city was known by international sailors as "Little San Francisco" and "jewel of the Pacific". Notable developments during this bustling period include Latin America's oldest stock exchange, the continent's first volunteer fire department, Chile's first public library, and the oldest Spanish language newspaper in continuous publication in the world, El Mercurio de Valparaíso. In 2003, the historic quarter of Valparaíso was declared a UNESCO World Heritage Site.

The twentieth century was unfavorable to Valparaíso, as many wealthy families abandoned the city. The opening of the Panama Canal in 1914, and the associated reduction in ship traffic, dealt a serious blow to the region's shipping- and port-based economy. By the 21st century, the port of San Antonio had surpassed Valparaíso in trade volume (TEU) handled, leading to the questioning of its traditional moniker of Puerto Principal ("principal port") of Chile.

Between 2000 and 2015, the city experienced a recovery, attracting artists, tourists, and cultural entrepreneurs, who settled after they were attracted by the city's hillside historic districts. Today, many thousands of people visit Valparaíso each month, from Chile and abroad to enjoy the city's labyrinth of cobbled alleys and colorful buildings. The Port of Valparaíso still continues to be a major distribution center for container traffic, copper, and fruit exports. It also receives growing attention from cruise ships that visit during the South American summer. Most significantly, Valparaíso has transformed itself into a major educational and entertainment hub, with four large traditional universities, and several large vocational colleges.

== History ==
Some older works starting with Benjamín Vicuña Mackenna (1869) claim that Valparaíso was within the range of the Chango people, but clear evidence for this is lacking.

The Bay of Valparaíso's first ethnically identifiable population were Picunche natives, known for their agriculture. Spanish explorers, considered the first European discoverers of Chile, arrived in 1536, aboard the Santiaguillo, a supply ship sent by Diego de Almagro.

The Santiaguillo carried men and supplies for Almagro's expedition, under the command of Juan de Saavedra, who named the town after his native village of Valparaíso de Arriba in Cuenca Province, Spain. The town's original name was Alimapu o Quintil.

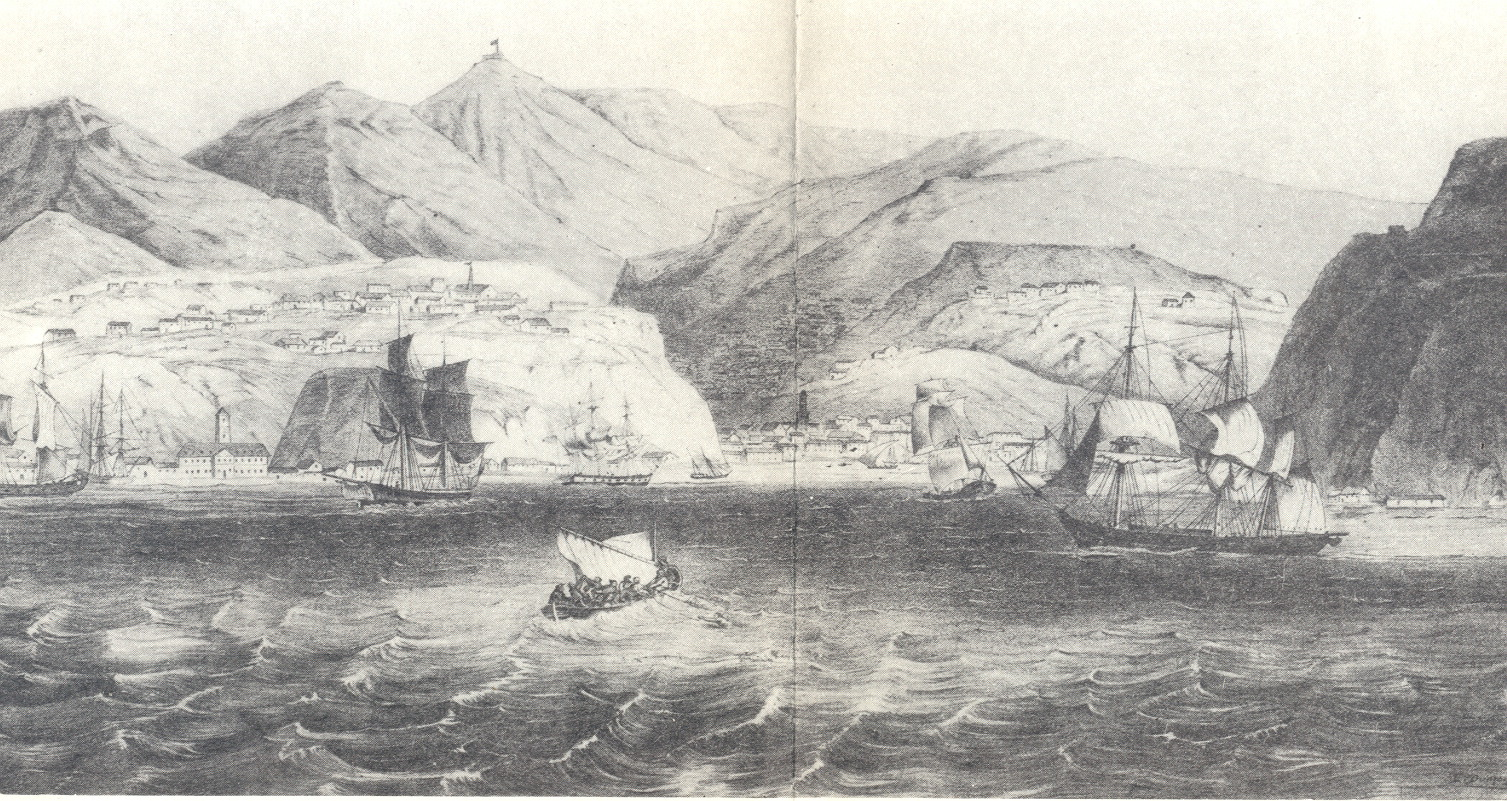
View of Valparaíso Bay (1830)

During Spanish colonial times, Valparaíso remained a small village, with only a few houses and a church. On some occasions she was attacked by English pirates and privateers, such as Francis Drake with his ship Golden Hind in 1578 and later his cousin Richard Hawkins with his ship Dainty in 1594. Drake's sack of Valparaíso gave origin to the legend about Cueva del Pirata.

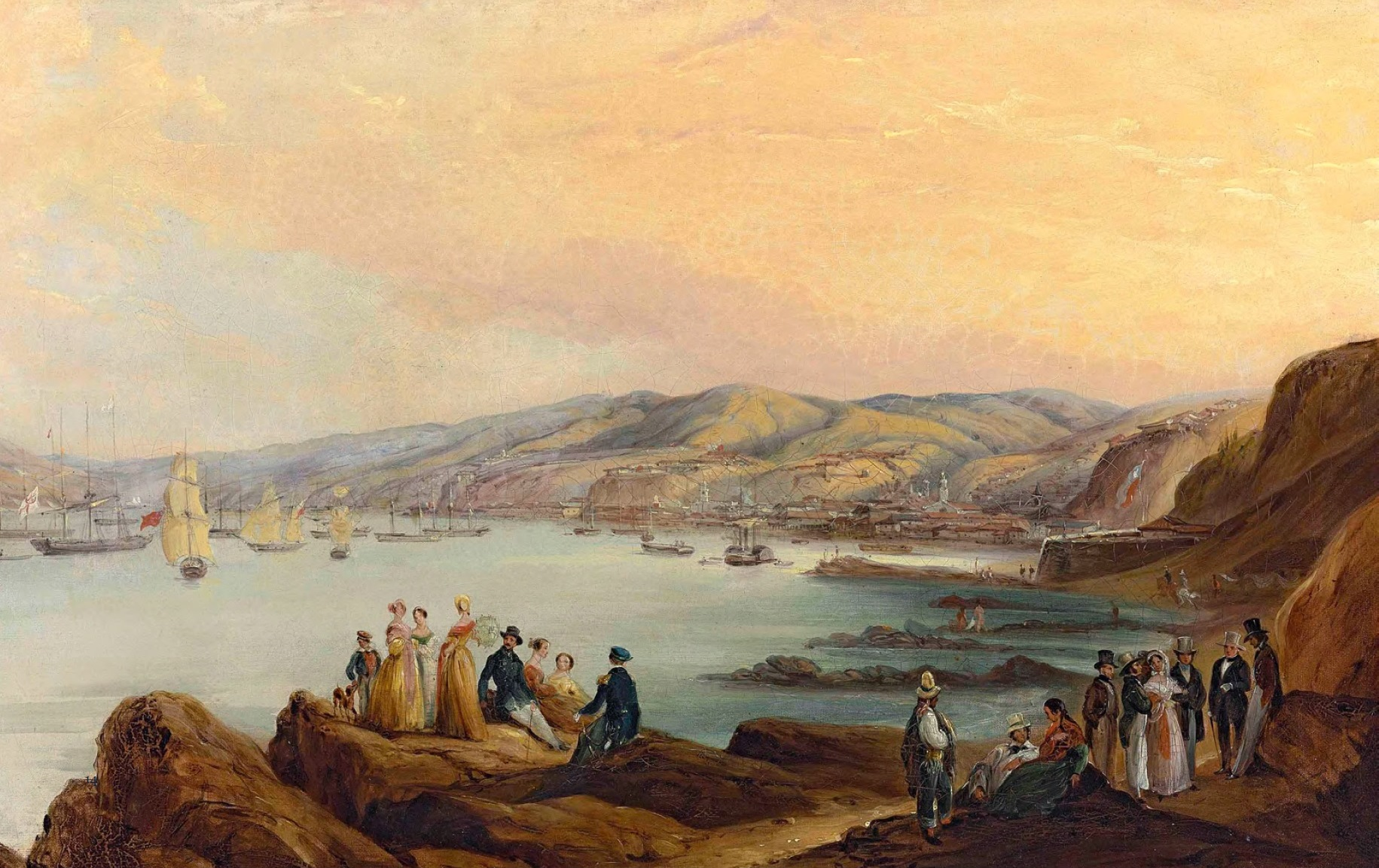
Valparaíso before 1846, by Johann Moritz Rugendas

In 1810, a wealthy merchant built the first pier in the history of Chile and the first during the colonial era. In its place today, stands the building of El Mercurio de Valparaíso. The ocean then rose to this point. Reclamation of land from the sea moved the coastline five blocks away. Between 1810 and 1830, he built much of the existing port of the city, including much of the land reclamation work that now comprises the city's commercial center. In 1814, the naval Battle of Valparaíso was fought offshore of the town, between American and British ships involved in the War of 1812. After Chile's independence from Spain (1818), beginning the Republican Era, Valparaíso became the main harbour for the nascent Chilean navy, and opened international trade opportunities that had been formerly limited to Spain and its other colonies.

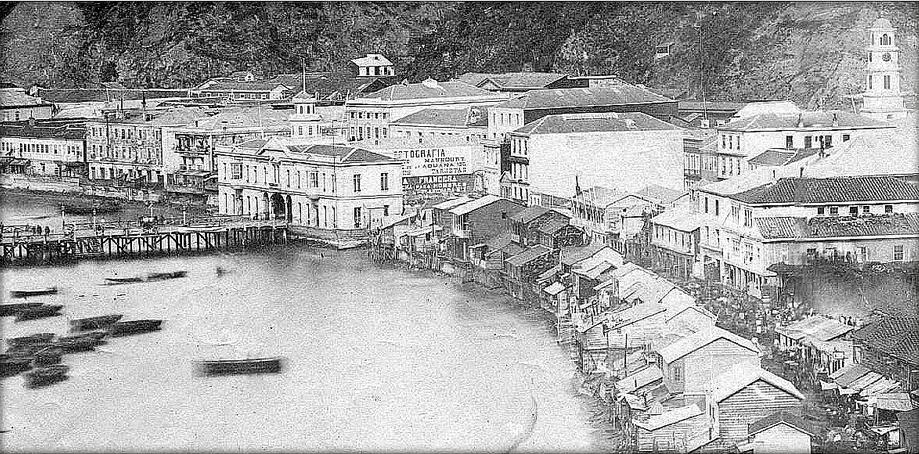
Valparaíso (c. 1863)

Valparaíso soon became a desired stopover for ships rounding South America via the Straits of Magellan and Cape Horn. It gained particular importance supporting and supplying the California gold rush (1848–1858). As a major seaport, Valparaíso received immigrants from many European countries, mainly from Britain, Germany, France, Switzerland, and Italy. German, French, Italian, and English were commonly spoken among its citizens, who founded and published newspapers in these languages.

Valparaíso found maritime competition with Callao (Perú). Both cities sought to be the dominant port on the Pacific Coast of South America during the period of time known as the High Trade (1880–1930). The British community, La Colonia Britanica, prospered in Valparaíso between the 1820s and 1920s. Firms such as Antony Gibbs & Sons, Duncan Fox, and Williamson-Balfour Company were doing business in the town, which had become a significant trading center by 1840, with 166 British ships, out of a total of 287, anchored in its port. The British settled on Cerro Alegre (Mount Pleasant) and Cerro Concepción. The Association of Voluntary Firemen was created in 1851, a telegraph service to Santiago was operating by 1852, and Chile's first telephone service was set up in 1880. The British Hospital was founded in 1897, and the British Arch, was erected in 1911. However, by 1895, Italian immigrants exceeded the British, and both the Italians and Germans were in larger numbers by 1907. By 1920, both the Italians and Spanish outnumbered the British, and the primary British community within Chile resided in Santiago.

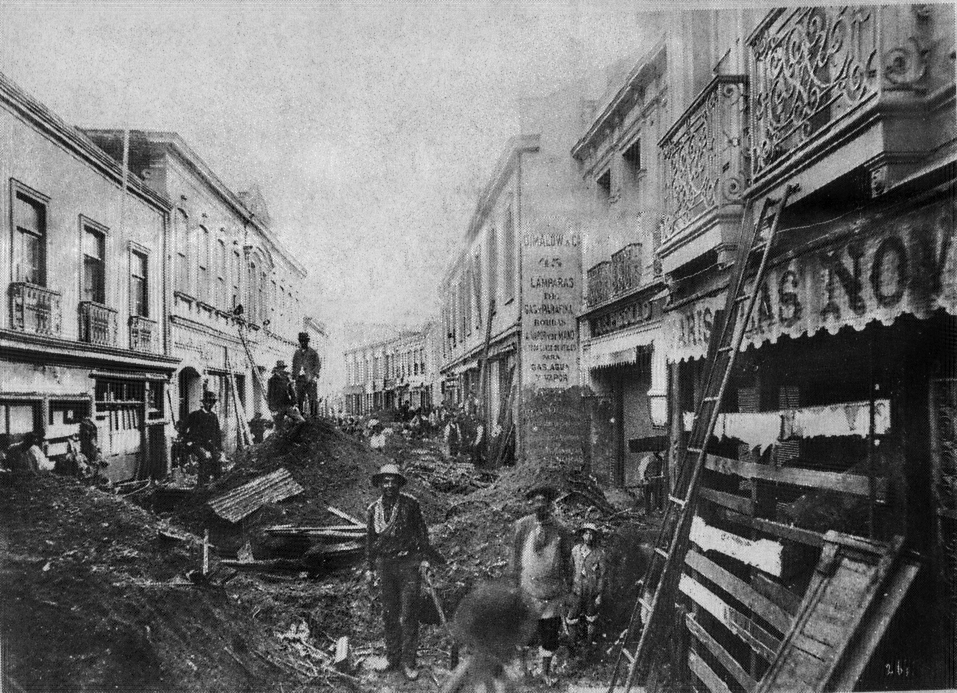
1906 Valparaíso earthquake

International immigration transformed the local culture from Spanish origins and Amerindian origins, in ways that included the construction of the first non-Catholic cemetery of Chile, the Dissidents' Cemetery. Football (soccer) was introduced to Chile by English immigrants; and the first private Catholic school in Chile, Le Collège des Sacrés Cœurs ("Sacred Hearts College") and its accompanying Sacred Hearts Church, by French immigrants. Immigrants from Scotland and Germany founded the first private secular schools (The Mackay School and Die Deutsche Schule, respectively). Immigrants formed the first volunteer fire-fighting units (still a volunteer activity in Chile). Their buildings reflected a variety of European styles, making Valparaíso more varied than some other Chilean cities.

On 16 August 1906, a major earthquake struck Valparaíso; there was extensive property damage and thousands of deaths. The Chilean doctor, Carlos Van Buren, of U.S. descent, was involved in the medical care of earthquake victims. He later established the Hospital Carlos Van Buren in 1912.

The golden age of Valparaíso's commerce ended after the opening of the Panama Canal in 1914. Shipping shifted to the canal as captains sought to avoid the risks of the Strait of Magellan. The port's use and traffic declined significantly, causing a decline in the city's economy. The opening of the Panama Canal was one of the most critical events in the shaping of Valparaíso's economy. Since the turn of the 21st century, shipping has increased in the last few decades with fruit exports, opening the Chilean economy to world commerce, and larger-scale, Post-Panamax ships that do not fit the Panama Canal.

=== 19th century ===
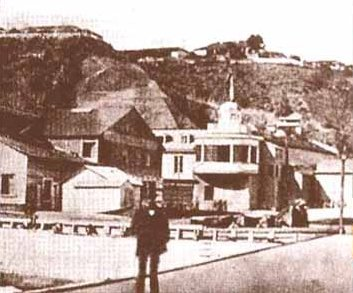
Daguerreotype of Valparaíso about 1852

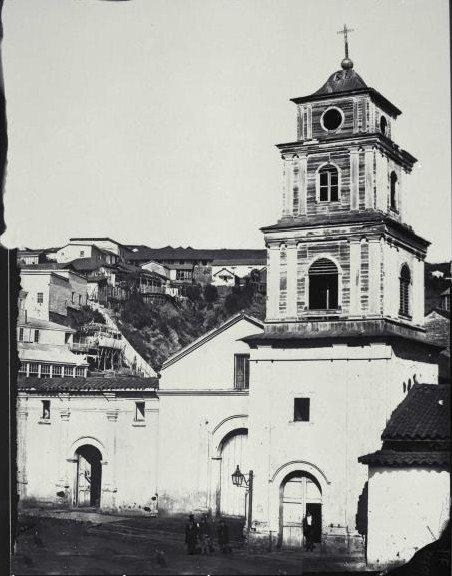
Picture of the Church of San Francisco in 1864

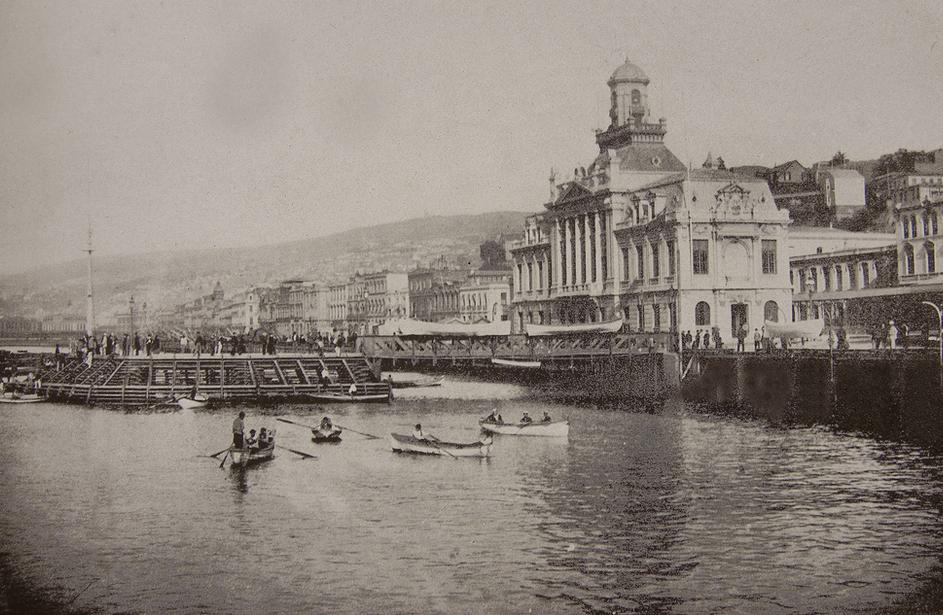
Picture of the city in 1888

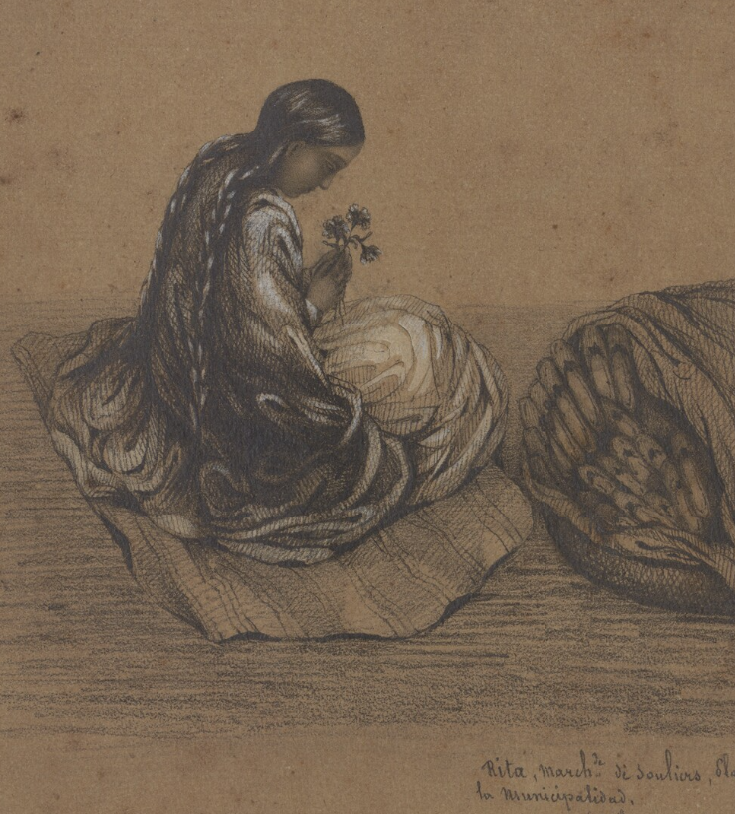
Rita, a shoe seller in the city, by Adele de Dombasle c.1847–48

On 28 March 1814, the USS Essex was defeated by British frigates Phoebe and Cherub during the War of 1812, leading to the deaths of 58 US Marines. Captain David Porter, a survivor of this attack, retired to Portersville, Indiana and requested to change the name to Valparaiso, commemorating the only naval battle he ever lost. By 2 August 1820, the Liberating Expedition of Peru sailed from Valparaíso.

At 10:30 pm on the evening of 19 November 1822, Valparaíso experienced a violent earthquake that left the city in ruins; of the 16,000 residents, casualties included at least 66 adults and 12 children, as well as 110 people wounded. The next day, a meteor trail was visible from Quillota to Valparaíso, seen as a religious experience for much of the population. In 1826, the Royal Navy Great Britain established a South America Station in Valparaíso to maintain British naval interest in the region. It remained until 1865, when it was moved to Esquimalt, British Columbia. On 12 September 1827, El Mercurio de Valparaíso, the oldest circulating newspaper in the Spanish language worldwide, was established.

In May 1828, a constitutional convention began regular meetings in the church of San Francisco. By August 9, the Constitution of the Republic of Chile was fully drafted and disseminated. On 6 June 1837, Minister Diego Portales was shot on orders of Captain Santiago Florín at the port by Baron Hill on suspicion of promoting conspirators who opposed the Peru-Bolivian Confederation, considered a turning point of Chilean public opinion and the purpose of the war.

By 1851, the first fire brigade in the country was formed. In 1852, potable running water became available, as well as the first telegraph service in Latin America, between the city and Santiago. Four years later streetlights with 700 gas lanterns, were installed. In 1861, the first tram company was formed, mostly using horses or mules to draw them, and fully established over the next few years. In 1852, British shipping company Williamson, Balfour & Cía was established in Valparaíso to handle trade in the region.

Taking advantage of the total lack of defenses, a Spanish fleet commanded by Casto Méndez Núñez bombarded the city during the Chincha Islands War in 1866. Chilean merchant ships were sunk, except for those vessels whose captains hoisted foreign flags. A merger of the National Steamship Company and Chilean Steamship Company, the South American Steamship Company was created as a national response to the increasing dominance of the Pacific Steam Navigation Company in 1872. In 1880 the Chilean Telephone Company was formed by Americans Joseph Husbands, Peter MacKellar, James Martin, and the U.S. consul Lucius Foot, the first official telephone company in the country. Three years later on the first of December, Concepción funicular opened, the first of many hydraulic systems. After the country's independence and its consequent openness to international trade, Valparaíso became an important port of call on trade routes through the Eastern Pacific. Many immigrants settled there, mostly from Europe and North America, and they helped include Valparaíso and Chile in the Industrial Revolution sweeping other parts of the world. That created a different city with civil, financial, commercial, and industrial institutions, many of which still exist today.

Population increases resulted. The city reached more than 160,000 inhabitants in the late nineteenth century, making it necessary to use the steep hills for more houses, mansions and even cemeteries. The lack of available land caused the city authorities and developers to reclaim low lying tidal marshland (polders) upon which to build administrative, commercial and industrial infrastructure.

=== 20th century ===
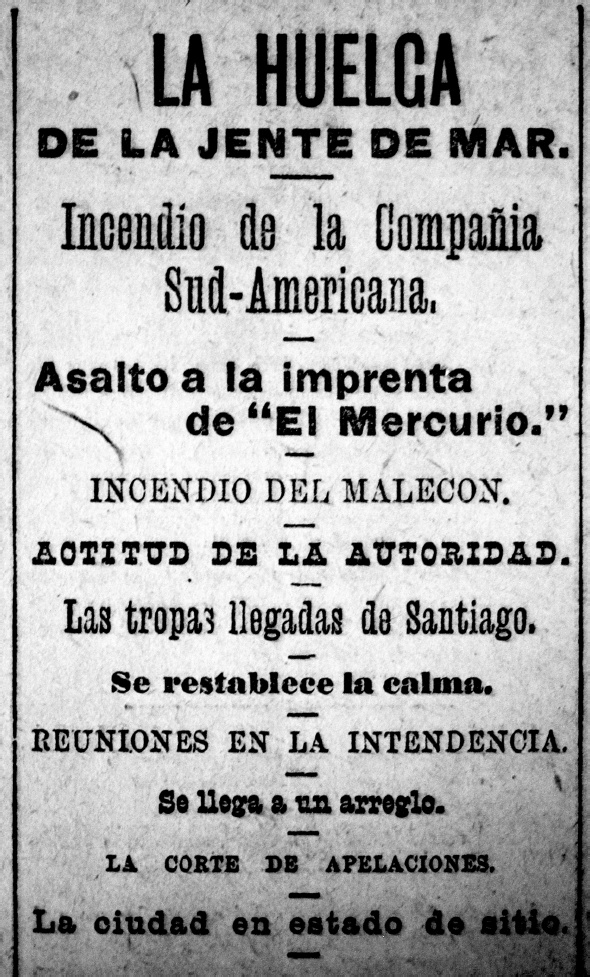
Headlines of El Mercurio de Valparaíso on 14 May 1903; in English, it reads: The Strike of the Seafarers. Fire of the South American Company. Assault on the printing press of El Mercurio. Fire of the Malecon. Attitude of the Authority. The troops arrived from Santiago. The calm is restored. Meetings in the Municipality. It reaches an Arrangement. The Court of Appeals. The city in State of Siege. El Mercurio, 1903

The twentieth century began with the first big protest of dockworkers, Chile on 15 April 1903, due to complaints by dockers about their excessive working hours and demands for higher wages, requests that were ignored by employers, creating a tense situation that led to serious violence on 12 May. There were protests and the burning of the CSAV offices and several people were shot and killed. All this prompted intervention by the state. This protest was important for the future of Trade Unionism in the country. That same year, electric trams were introduced.

The 1906 Valparaíso earthquake caused severe damage throughout the city on 16 August, which was at that time the heart of the Chilean economy. The damage was valued at hundreds of millions of pesos of the time, and human victims were counted at 3,000 dead and over 20,000 injured. After the removal of the debris, reconstruction work began which included the widening of streets, culverting and covering streams, (Jaime and Delicias–and creating the avenues Francia and Argentina respectively). The main street of the city (Pedro Montt) was laid and Plaza O'Higgins was created; a hill was removed to allow the passage of Colon Street. The damaged Edwards mansion was demolished and in its place, the present Cathedral of Valparaíso was built and, among many other works it gave shape to the Almendral Valparaíso area.

In 1910, the port expansion work of the city began and ended in 1930. A long breakwater was built, along with piers and docking terminals. The Imperial German East Asia Squadron engaged the British West Indies Squadron on 1 November 1914 at the Battle of Coronel off the coast of Valparaiso, sinking two British cruisers. After the battle the East Asia Squadron stayed in Valparaiso Harbor before continuing to the Falklands.

=== 21st century ===
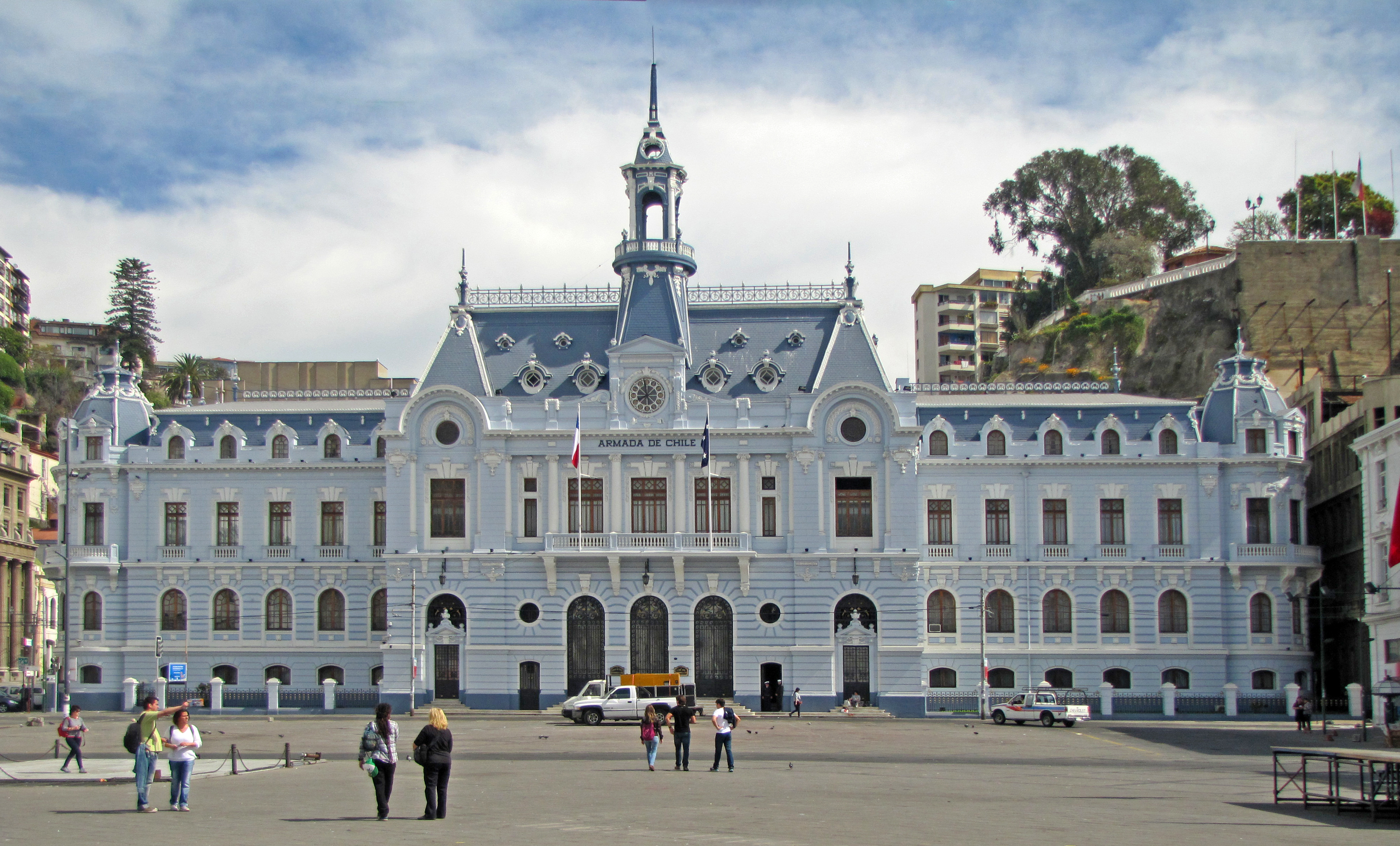
Edificio Armada de Chile

Chile's legislature along with other institutions of national importance like the National Customs Service, the National Fish and Aquaculture Ministry, the Ministry of Culture and the Barracks General of the Chilean Navy are sited in the city. In addition to the capital of the Valparaíso Region hosts the Regional Administration and government. In 2003, Valparaíso became an UNESCO World Heritage Centre. This title was awarded to Valparaiso for its unique urban form, as well as its clear maintained historical background as a colorful port city. In becoming a World Heritage Center, Valparaíso is tasked with maintaining its cultural heritage, through the maintenance of its historic infrastructure, like its Ascensores.

On 13 April 2014, a huge brush fire burned out of control, destroying 2,800 homes and killing 16 people, forcing President Michelle Bachelet to declare it a disaster zone. In early February 2024, a huge brush fire burned through Valparaiso and central Chile, killing at least 131 people.

== Geography ==
Valparaíso is located in central Chile, 120 km (75 mi) to the north west of the capital Santiago. Like most of Chile, it is vulnerable to earthquakes. Before the earthquake of February 27, 2010, which measured 8.8 on the moment magnitude scale, the last catastrophic earthquake to strike Valparaíso devastated the city in August 1906, killing nearly 3,000 people. Other significant earthquakes to affect the city were the 1730 Valparaíso earthquake and the 1985 Algarrobo earthquake.

=== Desventuradas Islands ===
The Desventuradas Islands are administered as part of Valparaíso.

=== Geology ===
Because of Valparaíso's proximity to the Peru–Chile Trench, the city is vulnerable to earthquakes. The Peru–Chile Trench stores large amounts of energy for a very long time and sometimes ruptures after short intervals in a violent earthquake.

=== Climate ===
Valparaíso has a very mild warm-summer Mediterranean climate (Köppen climate classification: Csb). The summer is essentially dry, but the city is affected by fogs from the Humboldt Current during most of the year. In the winter, rainfall can occasionally be extremely heavy when a powerful frontal system crosses central Chile, but frequency of such rains varies greatly from year to year. Monthly average temperatures vary just around 6 °C between the coolest and the warmest month, from 17 °C (63 °F) in January to 11.4 °C (52.5 °F) in July. Snowfall occurs rarely in the highest parts of the city. In winter, strong winds can lead to wind chill temperatures below freezing.

Climate data for Valparaíso, Chile (Punta Angeles Lighthouse, located at Playa Ancha University) 1991–2020 normals, extremes 1970–present
Month	Jan	Feb	Mar	Apr	May	Jun	Jul	Aug	Sep	Oct	Nov	Dec	Year
Record high °C (°F)	29.8 (85.6)	31.2 (88.2)	28.2 (82.8)	25.6 (78.1)	27.4 (81.3)	24.0 (75.2)	28.4 (83.1)	26.4 (79.5)	28.6 (83.5)	30.5 (86.9)	30.2 (86.4)	28.6 (83.5)	31.2 (88.2)
Mean daily maximum °C (°F)	21.9 (71.4)	22.2 (72.0)	21.9 (71.4)	19.8 (67.6)	18.5 (65.3)	17.1 (62.8)	16.3 (61.3)	17.3 (63.1)	17.3 (63.1)	19.0 (66.2)	20.0 (68.0)	21.5 (70.7)	19.4 (66.9)
Daily mean °C (°F)	17.9 (64.2)	17.9 (64.2)	16.8 (62.2)	15.2 (59.4)	13.9 (57.0)	12.6 (54.7)	12.1 (53.8)	12.5 (54.5)	13.2 (55.8)	14.1 (57.4)	15.4 (59.7)	16.6 (61.9)	14.9 (58.8)
Mean daily minimum °C (°F)	13.6 (56.5)	13.9 (57.0)	12.6 (54.7)	10.7 (51.3)	9.9 (49.8)	8.6 (47.5)	8.1 (46.6)	8.4 (47.1)	9.7 (49.5)	9.5 (49.1)	11.0 (51.8)	12.3 (54.1)	10.7 (51.3)
Record low °C (°F)	9.8 (49.6)	5.6 (42.1)	6.8 (44.2)	2.7 (36.9)	3.6 (38.5)	2.0 (35.6)	3.4 (38.1)	3.2 (37.8)	1.9 (35.4)	4.6 (40.3)	1.6 (34.9)	7.8 (46.0)	1.6 (34.9)
Average precipitation mm (inches)	0.2 (0.01)	1.2 (0.05)	2.8 (0.11)	14.9 (0.59)	66.2 (2.61)	106.1 (4.18)	66.7 (2.63)	61.2 (2.41)	24.9 (0.98)	12.7 (0.50)	3.8 (0.15)	2.5 (0.10)	363.2 (14.30)
Average precipitation days (≥ 1.0 mm)	0.0	0.2	0.4	1.5	3.7	5.8	4.4	3.8	2.2	1.3	0.5	0.3	24.0
Average relative humidity (%)	72	74	76	78	80	80	80	79	78	75	71	70	76
Mean monthly sunshine hours	279.0	245.7	217.0	174.0	114.7	81.0	93.0	117.8	147.0	170.5	216.0	263.5	2,119.2
Source 1: Dirección Meteorológica de Chile (humidity 1931–1960)
Source 2: Climate & Temperature (sunshine hours), NOAA (precipitation days 1991–2020)

Climate data for Valparaíso (Rodelillo Airfield) 1991–2020, extremes 1975–present)
Month	Jan	Feb	Mar	Apr	May	Jun	Jul	Aug	Sep	Oct	Nov	Dec	Year
Record high °C (°F)	34.6 (94.3)	35.0 (95.0)	33.0 (91.4)	35.8 (96.4)	35.3 (95.5)	29.2 (84.6)	31.5 (88.7)	32.3 (90.1)	31.9 (89.4)	32.3 (90.1)	34.9 (94.8)	33.4 (92.1)	35.8 (96.4)
Mean daily maximum °C (°F)	23.3 (73.9)	22.6 (72.7)	22.0 (71.6)	19.9 (67.8)	17.3 (63.1)	15.5 (59.9)	15.0 (59.0)	15.6 (60.1)	16.9 (62.4)	18.6 (65.5)	20.9 (69.6)	22.3 (72.1)	19.2 (66.6)
Daily mean °C (°F)	17.9 (64.2)	17.4 (63.3)	16.8 (62.2)	15.1 (59.2)	13.2 (55.8)	11.6 (52.9)	11.0 (51.8)	11.4 (52.5)	12.4 (54.3)	13.6 (56.5)	15.3 (59.5)	16.7 (62.1)	14.4 (57.9)
Mean daily minimum °C (°F)	12.4 (54.3)	12.3 (54.1)	11.7 (53.1)	10.4 (50.7)	9.1 (48.4)	7.9 (46.2)	7.0 (44.6)	7.2 (45.0)	8.0 (46.4)	8.6 (47.5)	9.8 (49.6)	11.2 (52.2)	9.6 (49.3)
Record low °C (°F)	7.4 (45.3)	6.2 (43.2)	2.3 (36.1)	3.0 (37.4)	2.0 (35.6)	0.1 (32.2)	0.1 (32.2)	−0.1 (31.8)	1.1 (34.0)	2.4 (36.3)	1.6 (34.9)	5.5 (41.9)	−0.1 (31.8)
Average precipitation mm (inches)	0.7 (0.03)	1.1 (0.04)	3.9 (0.15)	20.4 (0.80)	96.0 (3.78)	161.7 (6.37)	89.3 (3.52)	88.7 (3.49)	37.9 (1.49)	15.5 (0.61)	5.0 (0.20)	3.7 (0.15)	523.9 (20.63)
Average precipitation days (≥ 1.0 mm)	0.1	0.1	0.6	1.7	3.9	5.9	4.7	4.3	2.8	1.4	0.6	0.6	26.7
Source 1: Dirección Meteorológica de Chile
Source 2: NOAA (precipitation days 1991–2020)

== Cityscape ==
Historic Quarter of the Seaport City of Valparaíso
UNESCO World Heritage Site
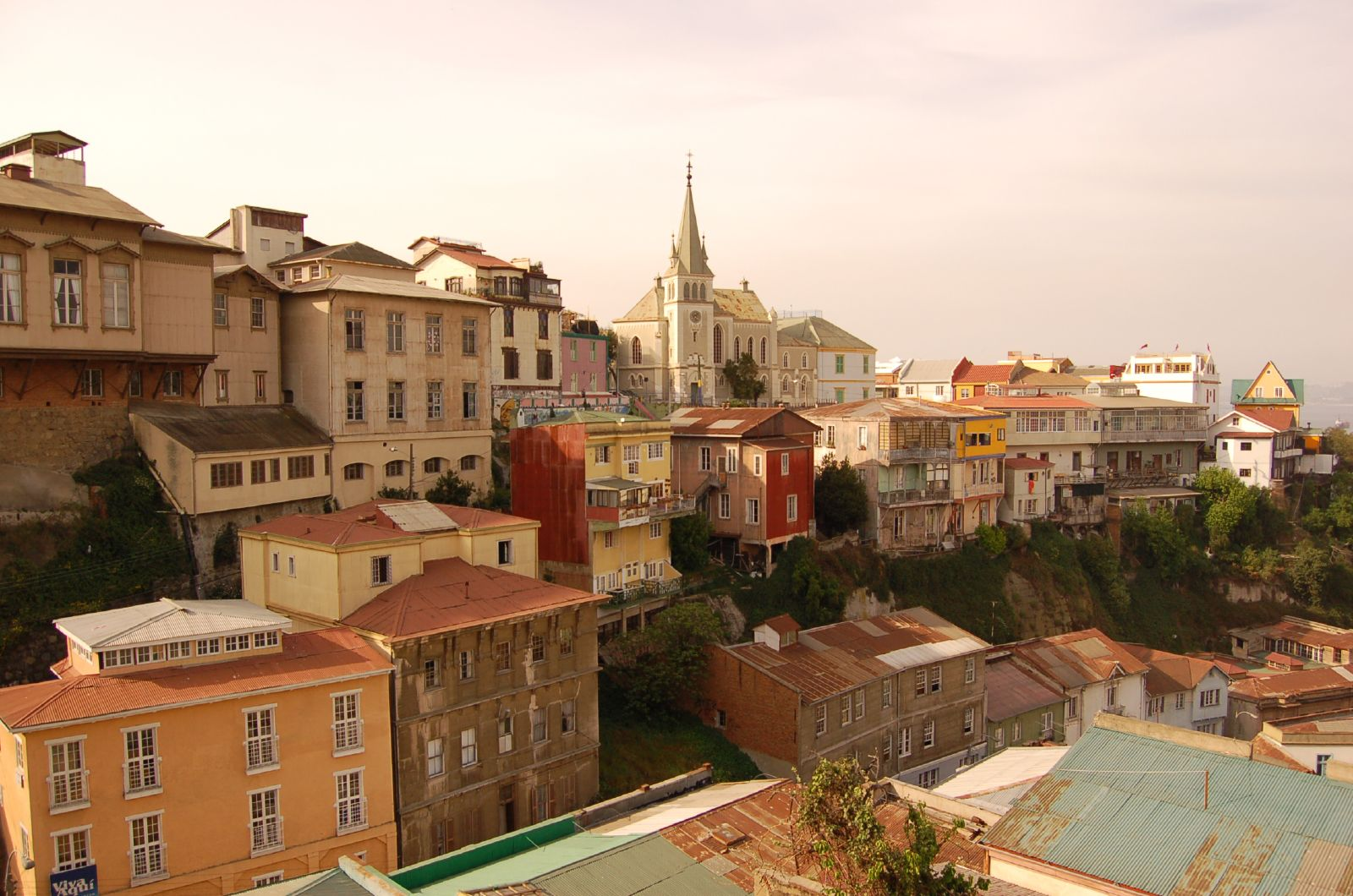
- Concepción hill
- Criteria: Cultural: iii
- Reference: 959
- Inscription: 2003 (27th Session)
- Area: 23.2 ha (57 acres)
- Buffer zone: 44.5 ha (110 acres)

Nicknamed "The Jewel of the Pacific", Valparaíso was declared a world heritage site based upon its improvised urban design and unique architecture. In 1996, the World Monuments Fund declared Valparaíso's unusual system of funicular lifts (steeply inclined carriages) one of the world's 100 most endangered historical treasures. In 1998, grassroots activists convinced the Chilean government and local authorities to apply for UNESCO world heritage status for Valparaíso. Valparaíso was declared a World Heritage Site in 2003. Built upon dozens of steep hillsides overlooking the Pacific Ocean, Valparaíso has a labyrinth of streets and cobblestone alleyways, embodying a rich architectural and cultural legacy. Valparaíso is protected as a UNESCO World Heritage Site.

Since its status as a World Heritage Site, Valparaíso has made several changes to its urban fabric in the process of maintaining its cultural heritage.

Landmarks include:

- Iglesia de la Matriz
- Aníbal Pinto Square
- Sotomayor Square including the Edificio Armada de Chile
- Edificio Luis Cousiño
- Courthouse
- 16 remaining funiculars (called ascensores): 15 public (national monuments) and 1 private (which belongs to the "Carlos van Buren Hospital").
- The Concepcion and Alegre historical district
- The Bellavista hill, which has the "Museo a Cielo Abierto" or "open air museum"
- Monument to Admiral Lord Thomas Alexander Cochrane, 10th Earl of Dundonald
- Monument to Manuel Blanco Encalada, first Chilean President
- Capilla del Carmen
- Cemeteries on Panteón Hill–Cemetery Number One (Catholic) and Dissidents Cemetery (Protestant)

=== Gallery ===
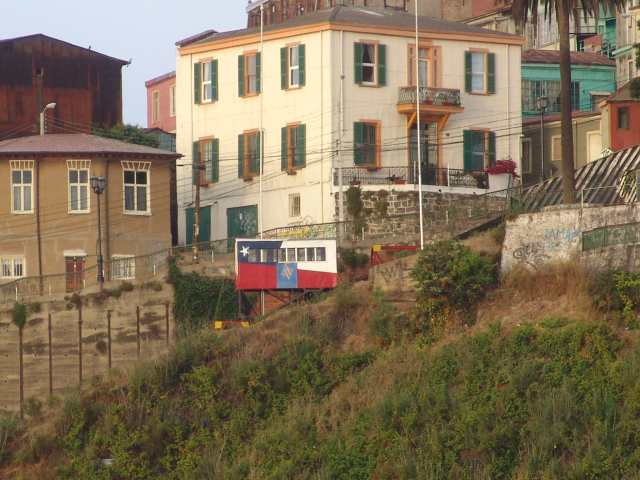
Concepción funicular, built in 1883

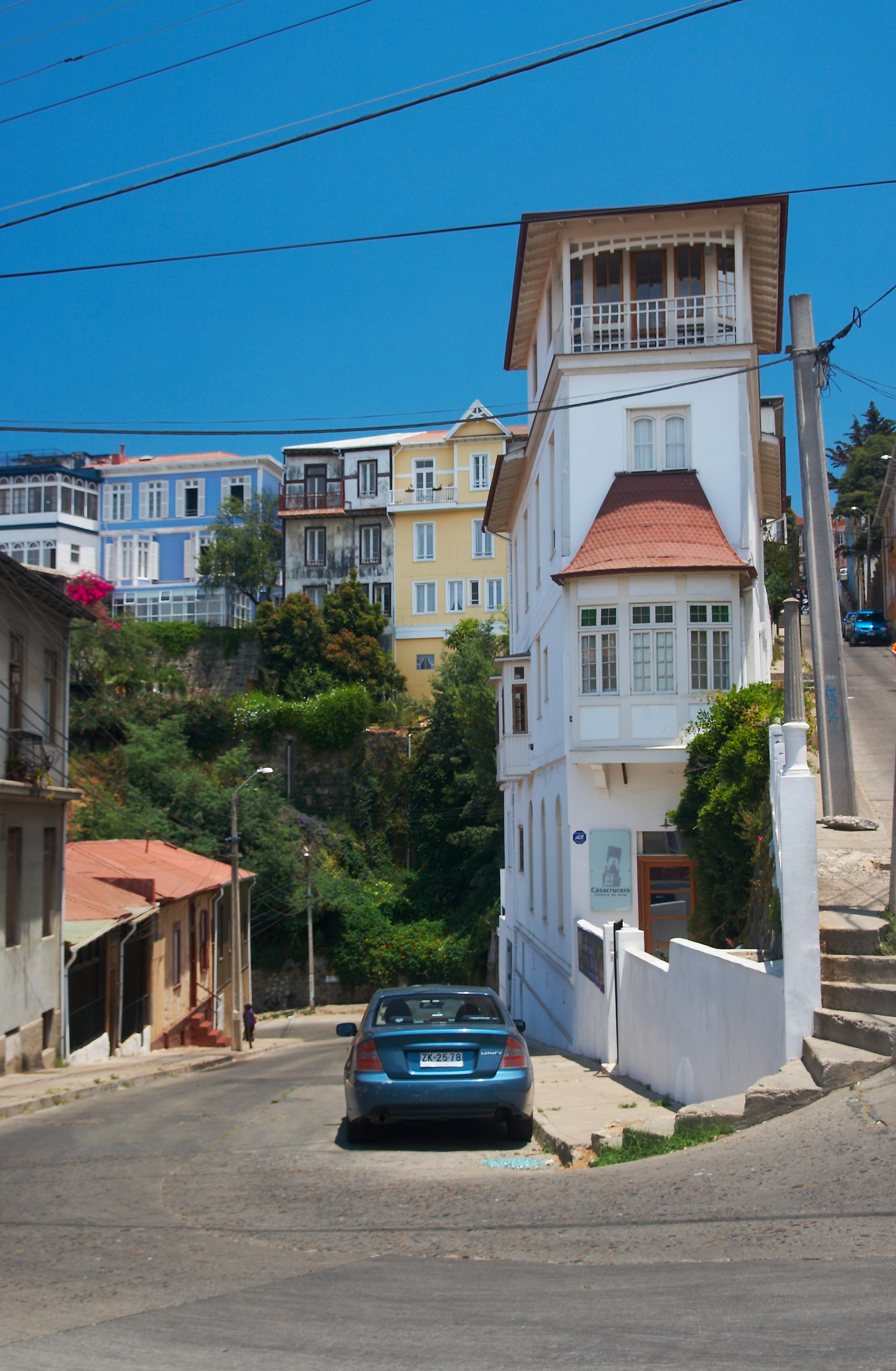
A street in Valparaíso

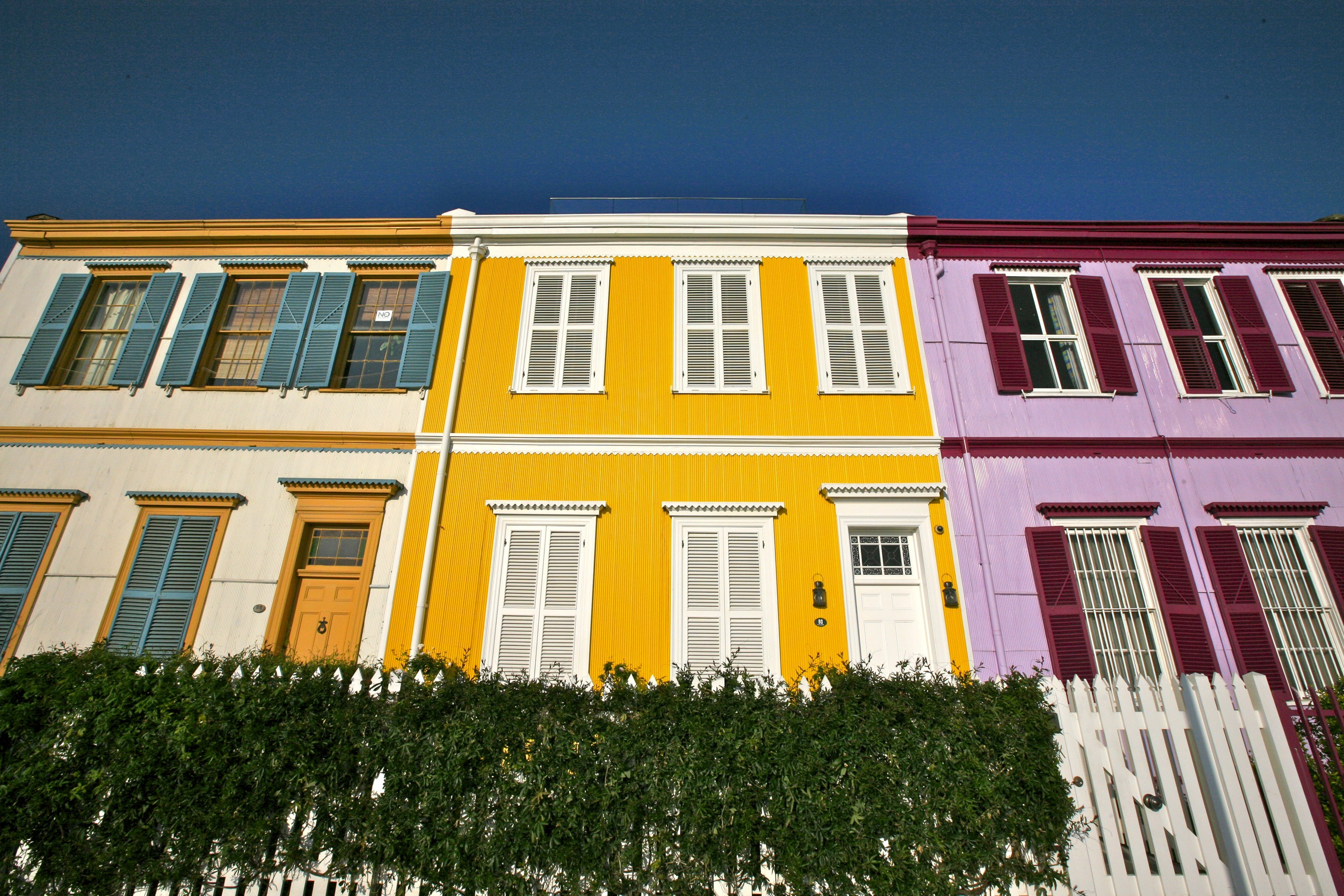
Many houses in Valparaíso are colorfully painted

== Demographics ==
Historical population
Year	Pop.	±% p.a.
1875	98,994	—
1885	109,584	+1.02%
1895	127,271	+1.51%
1907	164,689	+2.17%
1920	184,430	+0.87%
1930	196,025	+0.61%
1940	209,945	+0.69%
1952	218,829	+0.35%
1960	252,865	+1.82%
1970	254,812	+0.08%
1982	272,520	+0.56%
1992	282,840	+0.37%
2002	275,982	−0.25%
2017	296,655	+0.48%
2024	284,938	−0.57%
Source: INE, Memoria Chilena

As of the 2024 census, the commune has a population of 284,938, of which 48.6% are male and 51.4% are female. People under 15 years old make up 15.5% of the population, and people over 65 years old make up 16.3%. 99.4% of the population is urban and 0.6% is rural.

Although technically only Chile's 10th-largest city, the Greater Valparaíso metropolitan area, including the neighboring cities of Viña del Mar, Concón, Quilpué, and Villa Alemana is the second largest in the country (951,311 inhabitants).

Residents of Valparaíso are commonly called porteños (feminine: porteñas), Spanish for "port dweller".

=== Immigration ===
As of the 2024 census, immigrants make up 4.6% of the population - 3.9% are from South America, 0.4% from North America, 0.3% from Europe, 0.04% from Asia, 0.01% from Africa, and 0.01% from Oceania.

== Religion ==
- Pentecostal revival movement in Chile

== Government ==
As a commune, Valparaíso is a third-level administrative division of Chile administered by a municipal council, headed by a mayor who is directly elected every four years. For the 2024–2028 term, the mayor is Camila Nieto Hernández (FA). The communal council has the following members:

- Leonardo Contreras Neira (RN)
- Miguel Vergara González (REP)
- Valentina Véliz González (REP)
- Dante Iturrieta Méndez (UDI)
- Jorge López Morales (PDG)
- Alicia Zúñiga Valencia (PCCh)
- Lukas Cáceres Costa (FA)
- Thelmo Aguilar Rojas (Ind./FA)
- Vicente Celedón Collao (Ind./FRVS)
- Jazmin Murillo Jorquera (Ind./PPD)

Within the electoral divisions of Chile, Valparaíso is represented in the Chamber of Deputies by Andrés Celis (RN), Hotuiti Teao (Ind./EVOP), Luis Sánchez (REP), Tomás Lagomarsino (PR), Tomás de Rementería (PS), Camila Rojas (FA), Jorge Brito (FA), and Luis Cuello (PCCh) for the 2022–2026 term, as part of the 7th electoral district, together with Juan Fernández, Isla de Pascua, Viña del Mar, Concón, Algarrobo, Cartagena, Casablanca, El Quisco, El Tabo, San Antonio, and Santo Domingo. In the Senate, the commune is represented by Francisco Chahuán (RN), Kenneth Pugh (RN), Isabel Allende (PS), Juan Latorre (FA), and Ricardo Lagos Weber (PPD) for the 2018–2026 term, as part of the 6th senatorial constituency (Valparaíso Region).

The Chilean Congress meets in a modern building in the Almendral section of Valparaíso, after relocation from Santiago during the last years of the dictatorship of General Augusto Pinochet. Although congressional activities were to be legally moved by a ruling in 1987, the newly built site only began to function as the seat of Congress during the government of Patricio Aylwin in 1990.

== Economy ==
As of 2018, there were 8126 registered companies in Valparaíso. The Economic Complexity Index (ECI) that year was 1.99, while the economic activities with the highest Revealed Comparative Advantage (RCA) indices were photocopying services (56.79), rental of air transport equipment (54.05), and cargo handling (38.6).

=== Port of Valparaíso ===
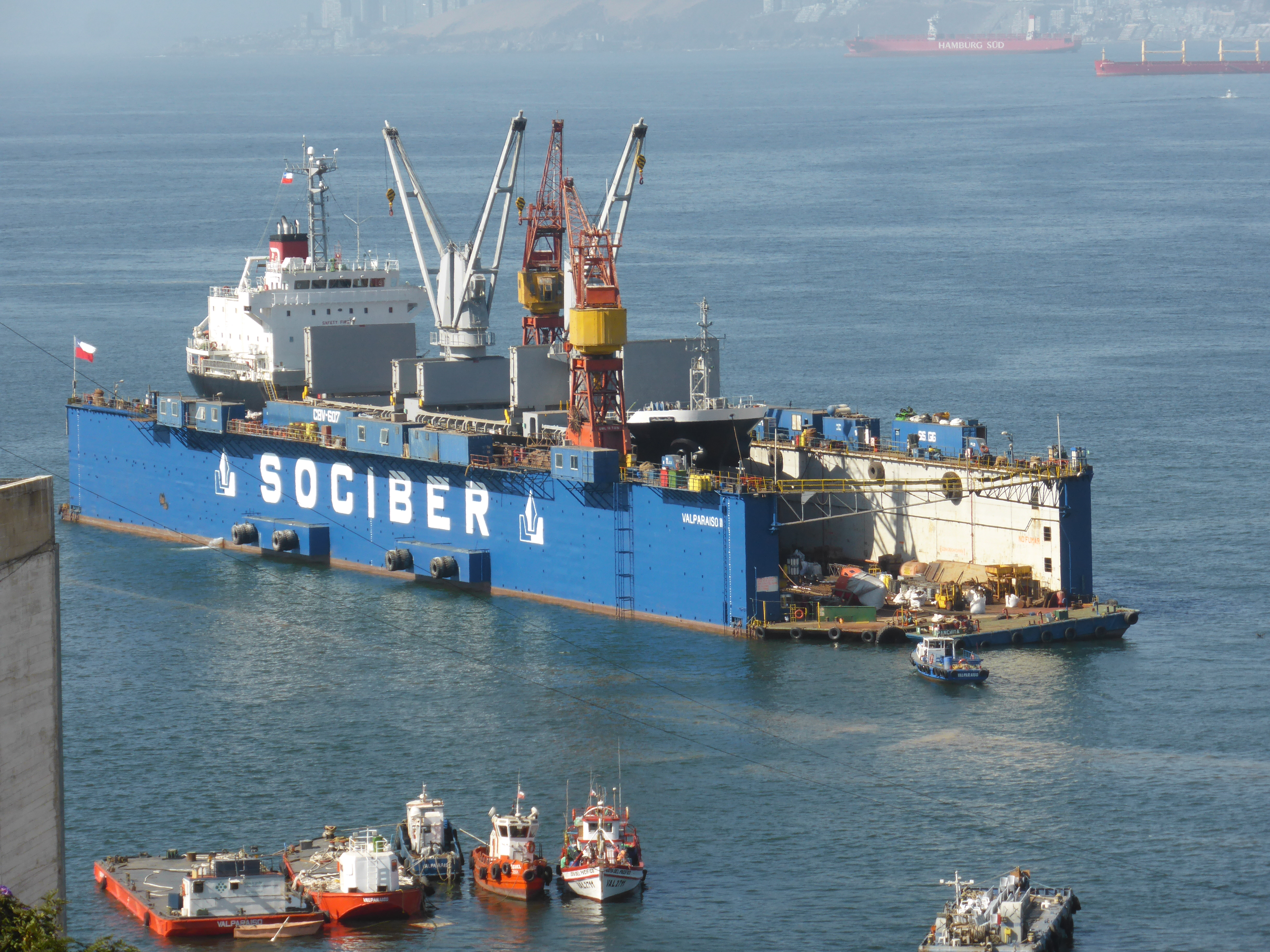
Floating dock Valparaíso III (1985), viewed from Cerro Concepción.

The first ship to arrive in Valparaíso was the Santiaguillo in 1536, supporting the expedition of Diego de Almagro.

In 1810, a wealthy merchant built the first dock in Chile's history — and the first of the colonial era — at the site where the building of El Mercurio de Valparaíso now stands, as at that time the sea reached that point (today it is five blocks farther due to land reclamation works).

Between 1910 and 1930, much of the current port infrastructure was built, including large-scale land reclamation.

Today, the Port of Valparaíso is divided into ten berths: berths 1–5 are operated by Terminal Pacífico Sur S.A., and berths 6–10 by the Valparaíso Port Company (EPV). The last two include a pier and serve as public promenades and a cruise terminal. In the near future, urban redevelopment projects are planned for this area.

Valparaíso is Chile's main container and passenger port, transferring 10 million tons annually and receiving about 50 cruise ships and 150,000 passengers each season.

Although Valparaíso hosts the port, the city does not directly benefit from its revenues, as all proceeds go to the national treasury in the central government. Furthermore, the municipality has no decision-making authority over port operations or appointments, which lie entirely with the national government.

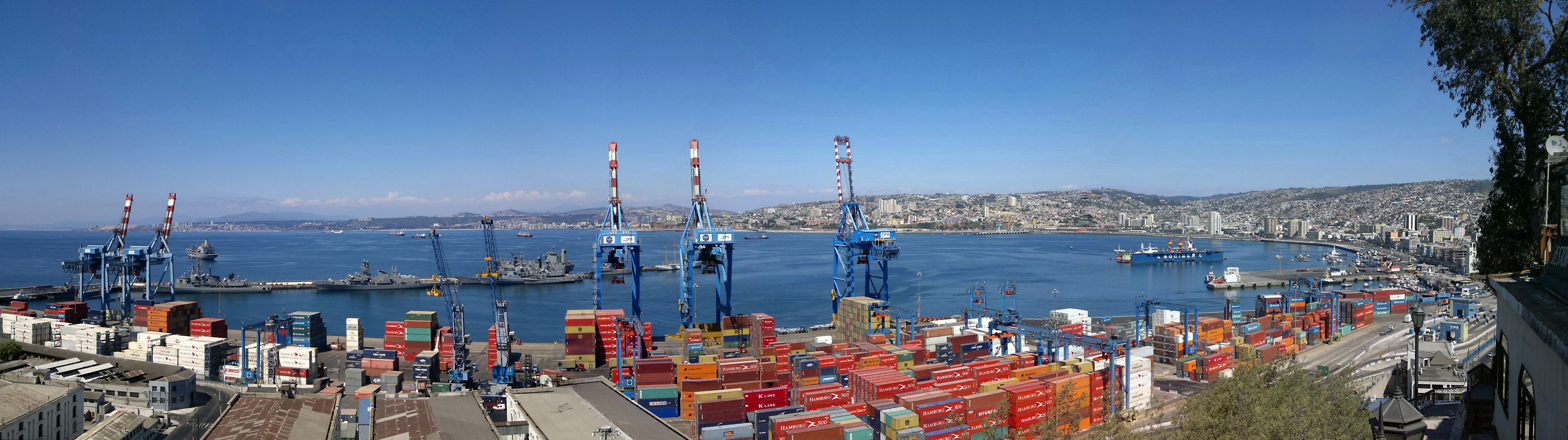
Panoramic view of the Port of Valparaíso from the 21 de Mayo lookout on Cerro Artillería.

=== Tourism ===
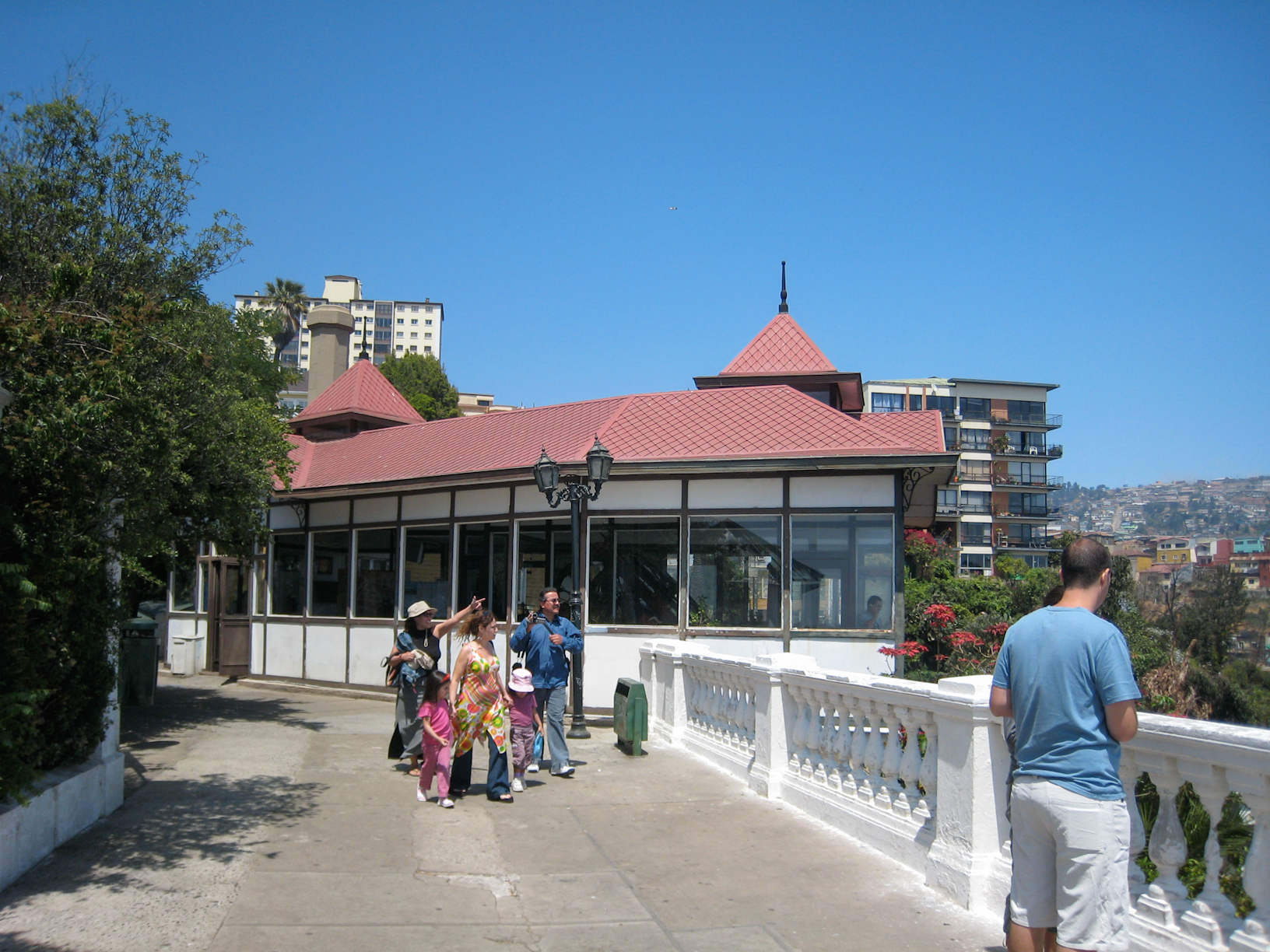
Tourists on Cerro Alegre.

The geography of Valparaíso, where the hills meet the coast, provides popular viewpoints overlooking the city. Scenic spots such as the Portales, Esperanza, O'Higgins, and Marina Mercante viewpoints, and promenades like 21 de Mayo, Yugoslavo, Gervasoni, Atkinson, and Dimalow, offer panoramic views of the port city. During New Year's Eve celebrations, these areas are filled with visitors seeking a view of the fireworks show.

Walking through the oldest hills — Cerro Alegre and Cerro Concepción — reveals colonial English architecture, 19th-century churches, and contemporary museums, gardens, and small squares. Around the hills and the El Almendral area are several museums, including:

- National Maritime Museum
- Lord Cochrane Museum
- Municipal Museum of Fine Arts (at the Palacio Baburizza)
- Natural History Museum
- Clown and Puppet Museum
- Municipal Art Gallery
- Lukas' House-Museum
- La Sebastiana, one of poet Pablo Neruda's homes.

=== Commerce ===
Currently, Valparaíso has 3 shopping malls, 4 strip centers, 4 major commercial avenues, and 1 outlet:

- Cenco Valparaíso (formerly Portal Valparaíso) (Jumbo, Easy, París, and La Polar)
- Mall Paseo del Puerto
- Mall Paseo Ross
- Strip Center Plaza Barón
- Strip Center Los Placeres
- Strip Center Parque Los Ingleses
- Strip Center Puerto Curauma
- Avenida Pedro Montt axis
- Avenida Uruguay axis
- Calle Victoria axis
- Avenida Condell axis
- Arauco Premium Outlet Curauma

== International relations ==
The city of Valparaíso hosts several international relations institutions, such as the Regional Unit for International Affairs (URAI) of the Regional Government of Valparaíso, responsible for analyzing and managing the region’s bilateral and multilateral relations with Latin America and the rest of the world; the International Relations Units of the Chamber of Deputies of Chile and the Senate of Chile; the International Affairs Unit of the Ministry of Cultures, Arts and Heritage; the International Affairs Unit of the Undersecretariat for Fisheries and Aquaculture of Chile; the Department of International Relations of the General Staff of the Chilean Navy; the Department of International Affairs of the General Directorate of the Maritime Territory and Merchant Marine (DIRECTEMAR); the International Relations Commission of the Regional Council of Valparaíso; the regional office of ProChile; and the Directorate of Economic Development and Cooperation of the Municipality of Valparaíso.

=== Migration management ===
In the area of international relations and migration management, the main actors in Valparaíso are the regional office of the National Migration Service, the Department of Migration and International Police of the Investigations Police of Chile, and the Municipal Migrant Office of Valparaíso.

=== Internationalization in higher education ===
In the field of international relations and higher education, the main actors in Valparaíso are the International Relations Commission of the Valparaíso Council of University Rectors; the Directorate of Institutional Relations of the University of Valparaíso, the General Directorate of International Affairs of the Pontifical Catholic University of Valparaíso, the General Directorate of International Affairs of the University of Playa Ancha, and the Office of International Affairs of the Federico Santa María Technical University.

=== Consulates ===
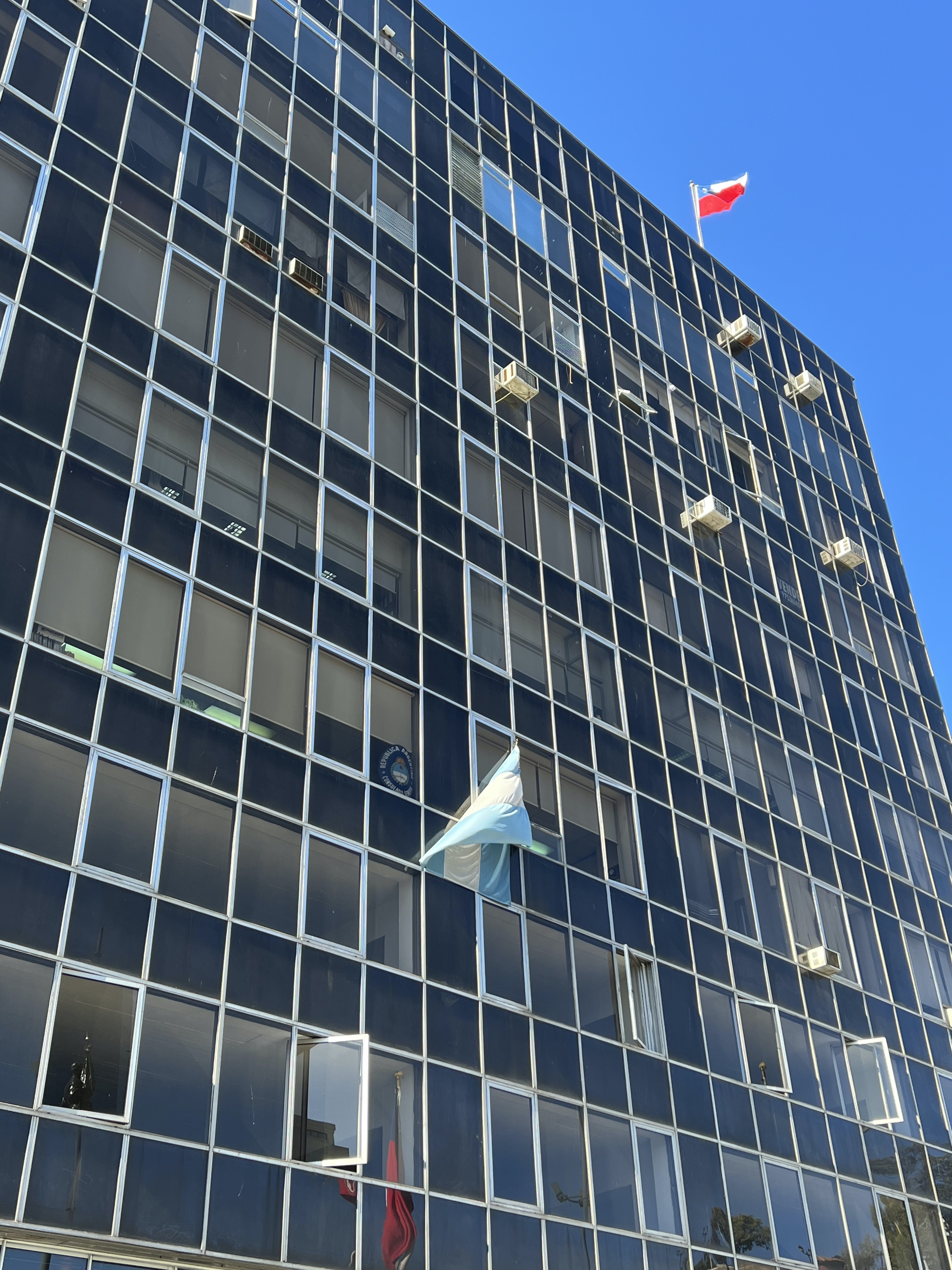
Consulate General of Argentina in Valparaíso.

- Argentina (Consulate General)
- Austria (Honorary Consulate)
- Belgium (Honorary Consulate)
- Brazil (Honorary Consulate)
- Denmark (Honorary Consulate)
- Ecuador (Honorary Consulate)
- France (Honorary Consulate)
- Guatemala (Honorary Consulate)
- Haiti (Honorary Consulate)
- Hungary (Honorary Consulate)
- Italy (Honorary Consulate)
- Panama (Consulate General)
- Peru (Consulate General)
- United Kingdom (Honorary Consulate)
- Russia (Honorary Consulate)
- Sweden (Honorary Consulate)

=== Twin towns – sister cities ===
Valparaíso is twinned with:

- Badalona, Spain
- Barcelona, Spain
- Bat Yam, Israel
- Busan, South Korea
- Callao, Peru
- Córdoba, Argentina
- Guangzhou, China
- Havana, Cuba
- Long Beach, United States
- Malacca, Malaysia
- Manzanillo, Mexico
- Medellín, Colombia
- Novorossiysk, Russia
- Oviedo, Spain
- Rosario, Argentina
- Salvador, Brazil
- Santa Fe, Spain
- Shanghai, China
- Veracruz, Mexico

=== Partnerships ===
Valparaíso cooperates with:

- Basel, Switzerland
- Odesa, Ukraine
- San Francisco, United States

== Transport ==
Metro Valparaiso Map

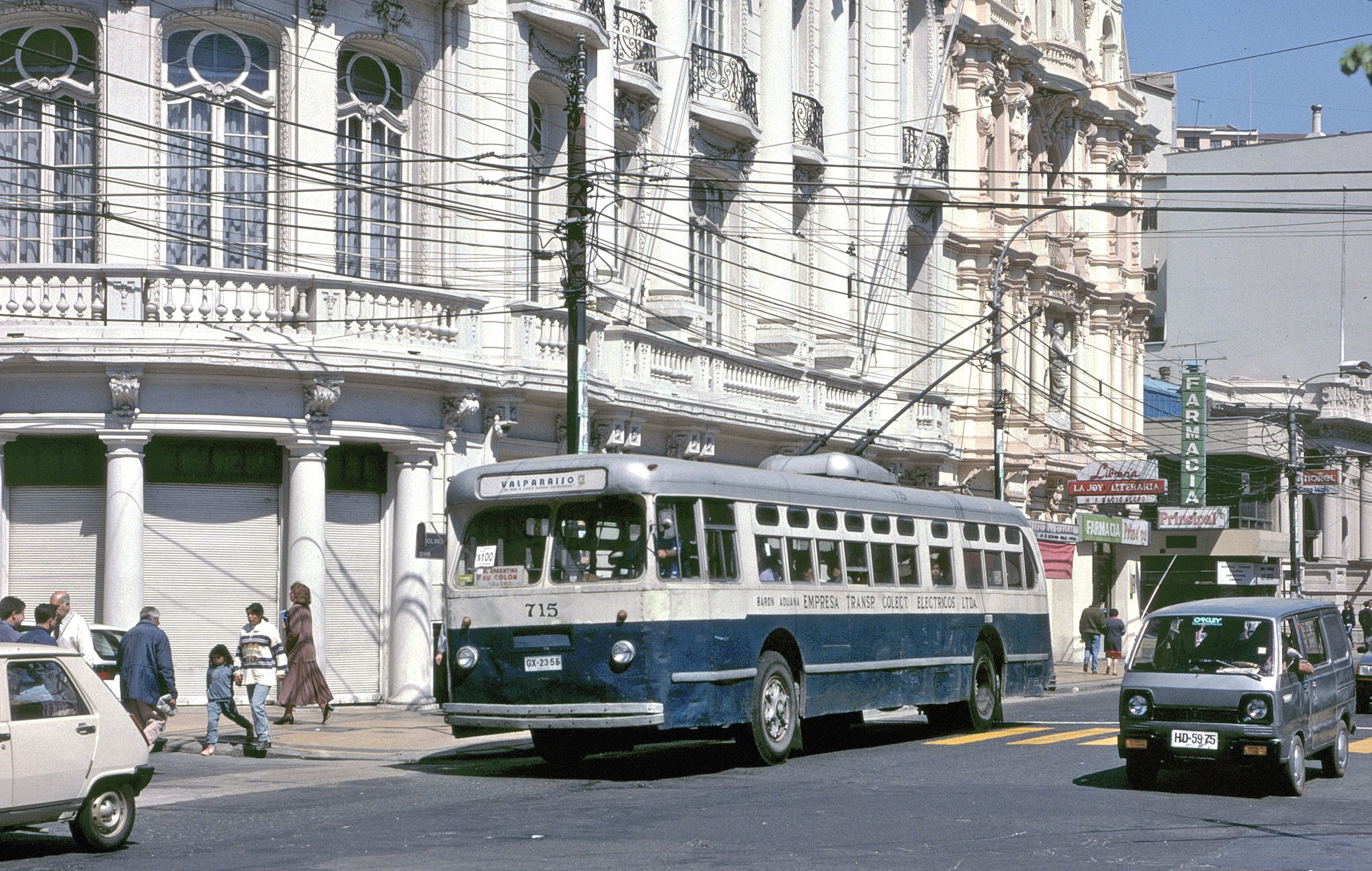
One of the historic trolleybuses that were still in daily service until the early 2020s

A commuter rail service, the Valparaíso Metro, opened to the public on 24 November 2005. The creation of this system involved updating parts of the Valparaíso-Santiago Railway, originally built in 1863. The Valparaíso Metro constitutes the so-called "fourth stage" ("Cuarta Etapa") of Metropolitan improvements. The Metro now connects the city core of Valparaíso with Viña del Mar and other cities. It extends along most of Gran Valparaíso, and is the second underground urban rail system in operation in Chile (after Santiago's), as it includes a tunnel section that crosses Viña del Mar's commercial district. The proposed Santiago–Valparaíso railway line would link Valparaíso and Santiago in around 45 minutes.

Public transport within Valparaíso itself is provided primarily by buses, trolleybuses and funiculars. The buses provide an efficient and regular service to and from the city centre and the numerous hills where most people live, as well as to neighbouring towns while more distant towns are served by long-distance coaches. Buses are operated by several private companies and regulated by the Regional Ministry of Transport, which controls fares and routes.

The Valparaíso trolleybus system has been in operation since 1952, and for many decades until the 2020s it continued to use some of its original vehicles, built in 1952 by the Pullman-Standard Company, along with an assortment of other vehicles acquired in the 1990s, mostly used vehicles from Switzerland. Some of Valparaíso's Pullman trolleybuses were even older, built in 1946–48, having been acquired secondhand from Santiago in the 1970s. By the 1990s, the surviving Pullman trolleybuses were the oldest trolleybuses still in normal service anywhere in the world, and in 2003 they were collectively declared National Historic Monuments by the Chilean government. In the mid-2010s, a group of 1989-built trolleybuses acquired secondhand from the Lucerne trolleybus system, in Switzerland, arrived, and by 2019 they had replaced all of the older Swiss vehicles. The last of the vintage Pullman-Standard trolleybuses were retired in March 2023.

Valparaíso's road infrastructure has been undergoing improvement, particularly with the completion of the "Curauma — Placilla — La Pólvora" freeway bypass, which will allow trucks to go directly to the port facility over a modern highway and through tunnels, without driving through the historic and already congested downtown streets. In addition, roads to link Valparaíso to San Antonio, Chile's second-largest port, and the coastal towns in between (Laguna Verde, Quintay, Algarrobo, and Isla Negra, for example), are also under construction. Travel between Valparaíso and Santiago takes about 80 minutes via a modern toll highway.

Internal passenger air services to Valparaíso are provided through the airport at Quintero which is some distance from the city but now served by good roads. The great majority of foreign visitors arrive through Santiago or on cruise liners.

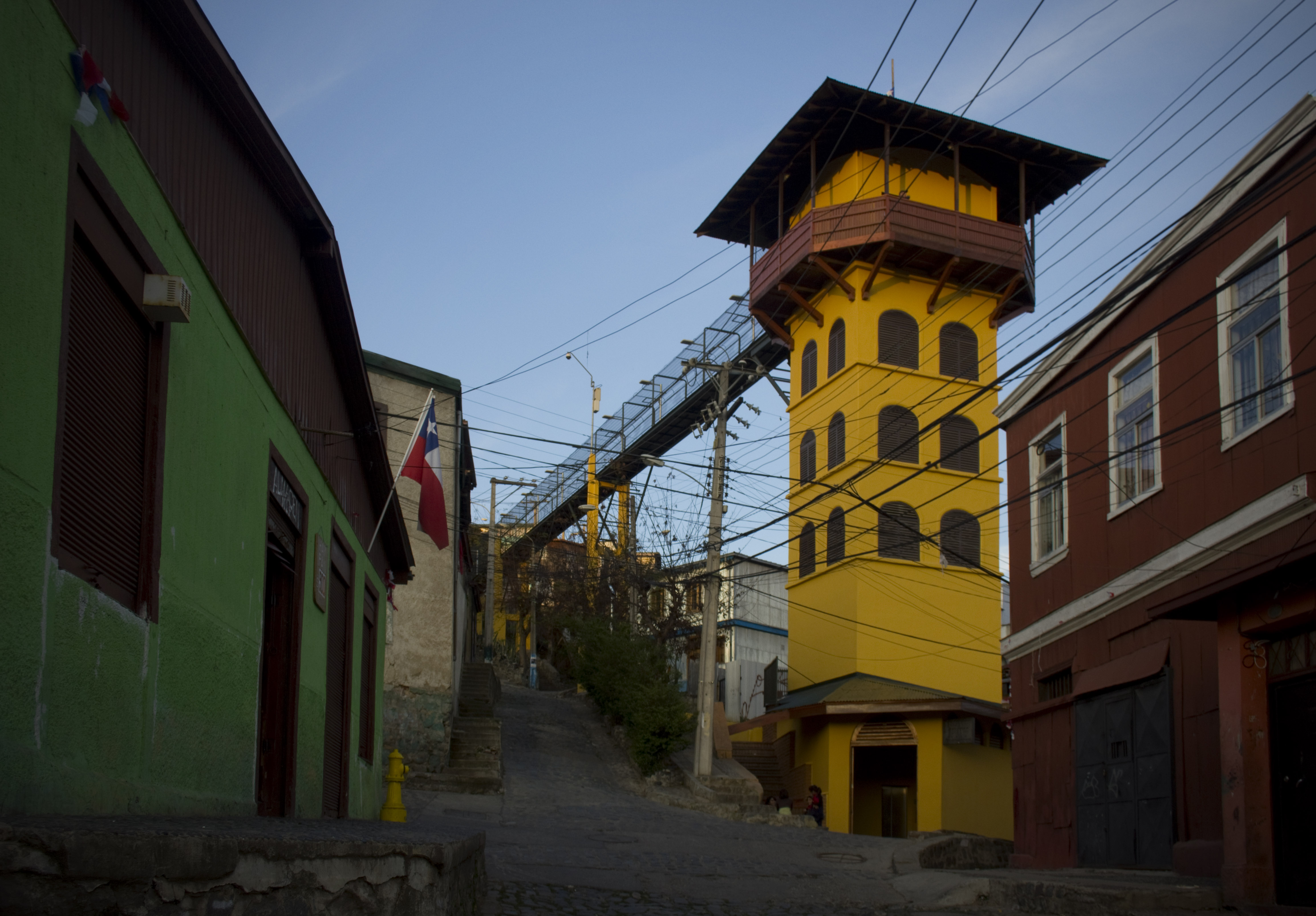
Polanco Lift

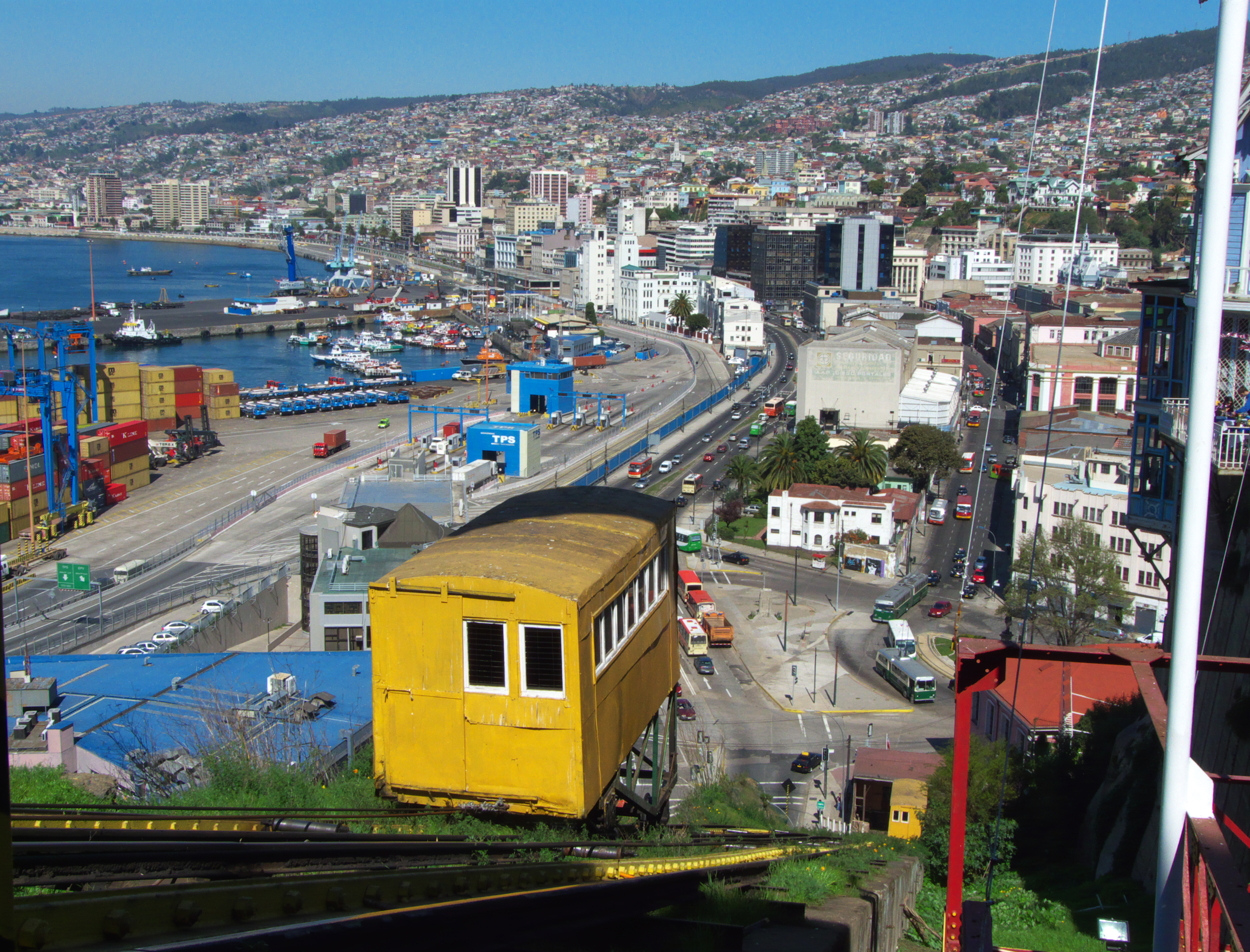
Artillería funicular railway

=== Funiculars ===
Because of the slopes of the hills, many of the surrounding areas of Valparaíso are inaccessible by public transport. That is why "elevators" serve the function of communicating the high part of the city with the plan, besides being a strong holiday highlight. The only elevator that can truly be called as such, is the Ascensor Polanco, because it is vertical. Meanwhile, the rest are cable cars but traditionally called elevators. Several of those funiculars – locally called ascensores – provide public transport service between the central area and the lower slopes of the surrounding hills, the first of which (Ascensor Concepción, also known as Ascensor Turri) opened in 1883, operated by steam, is still in service. The Cerro Cordillera elevator was built in 1887. As many as 28 different funicular railways have served Valparaíso at one time or another, of which 14 were still in operation in 1992 and still around 12 in 2010.

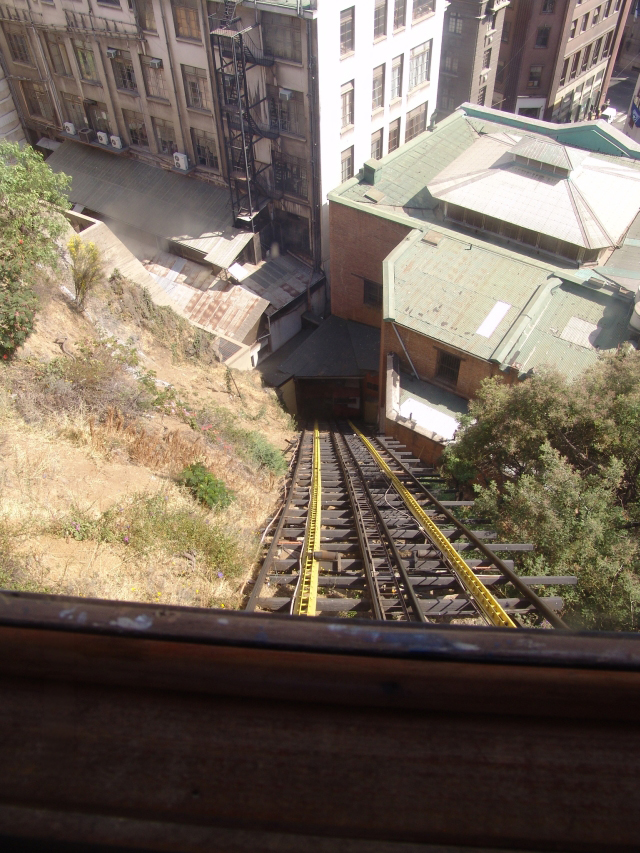
Ascensor Conception- built 1883

Valparaíso has fifteen lifts declared Historical Monuments by the National Monuments Council. Five are municipal property and the remaining belong to four private companies. The elevators are elevators municipal Baron, El Peral, Polanco, Queen Victoria and St. Augustine. As for the rest, lifts Florida, Butterflies and Nuns are owned by the National Elevator Company SA; Artillery, Concepción and Mountains belong to the Society of Mechanical Lifts Valparaíso Holy Spirit, Larraín and Villaseca (stopped for repairs) are the property of Valparaíso Elevators Company SA, and Dairy (stopped by fire) belongs to the Society of Dairy Cerro Lifts Ltd.

As a part of its 2003 declaration as a UNESCO World Heritage Site, Valparaíso has promised to replace and maintain its several funiculars. The funiculars were identified as an important cultural artifact.

=== Valparaíso public transportation statistics ===
The average amount of time people spend commuting with public transit in Valparaíso and Viña del Mar, for example to and from work, on a weekday is 68 min. 15% of public transit riders, ride for more than 2 hours every day. The average amount of time people wait at a stop or station for public transit is 13 min, while 15% of riders wait for over 20 minutes on average every day. The average distance people usually ride in a single trip with public transit is 7 km, while 12% travel for over 12 km in a single direction.

=== Port of Valparaíso ===
The port of Valparaíso is divided into ten sites, of which sites 1,2,3,4 and 5 are administered by South Pacific Terminal SA and sites 6,7,8,9 and 10 for Valparaíso Port Company. The last two sites include a dock and are used as public walks and cruise passenger terminal.

Valparaíso is the main container and passenger port in Chile, transferring 10 million tons annually, and serves about 50 cruises and 150,000 passengers.

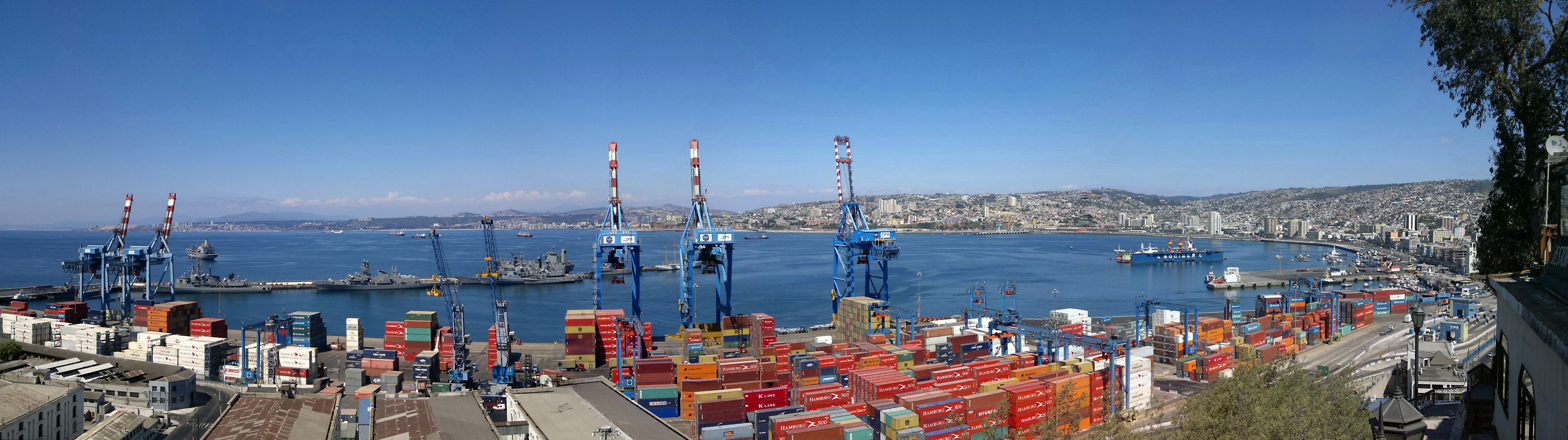
Overlooking the port of Valparaíso from the viewing point 21 de Mayo (May Twenty-one), Artillery Hill.

== Culture ==
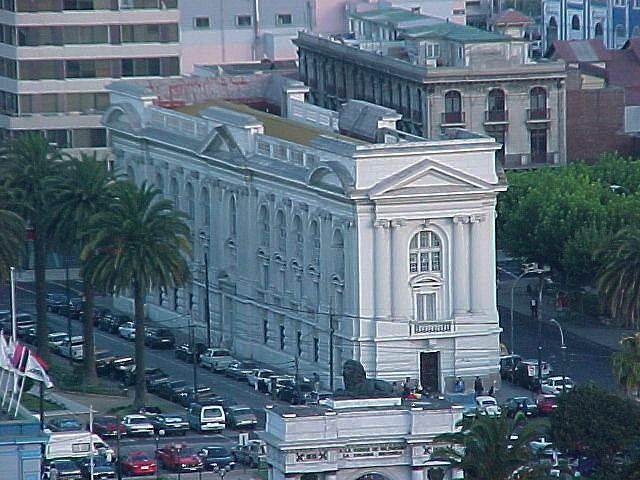
Santiago Severín Library

During Valparaíso's golden age (1848–1914), the city received large numbers of immigrants, primarily from Europe. The immigrant communities left a unique imprint on the city's noteworthy architecture. Each community built its own churches and schools, while many also founded other noteworthy cultural and economic institutions. The largest immigrant communities came from Britain, Germany, and Italy, each developing their own hillside neighbourhood, preserved today as National Historic Districts or "Zonas Típicas".

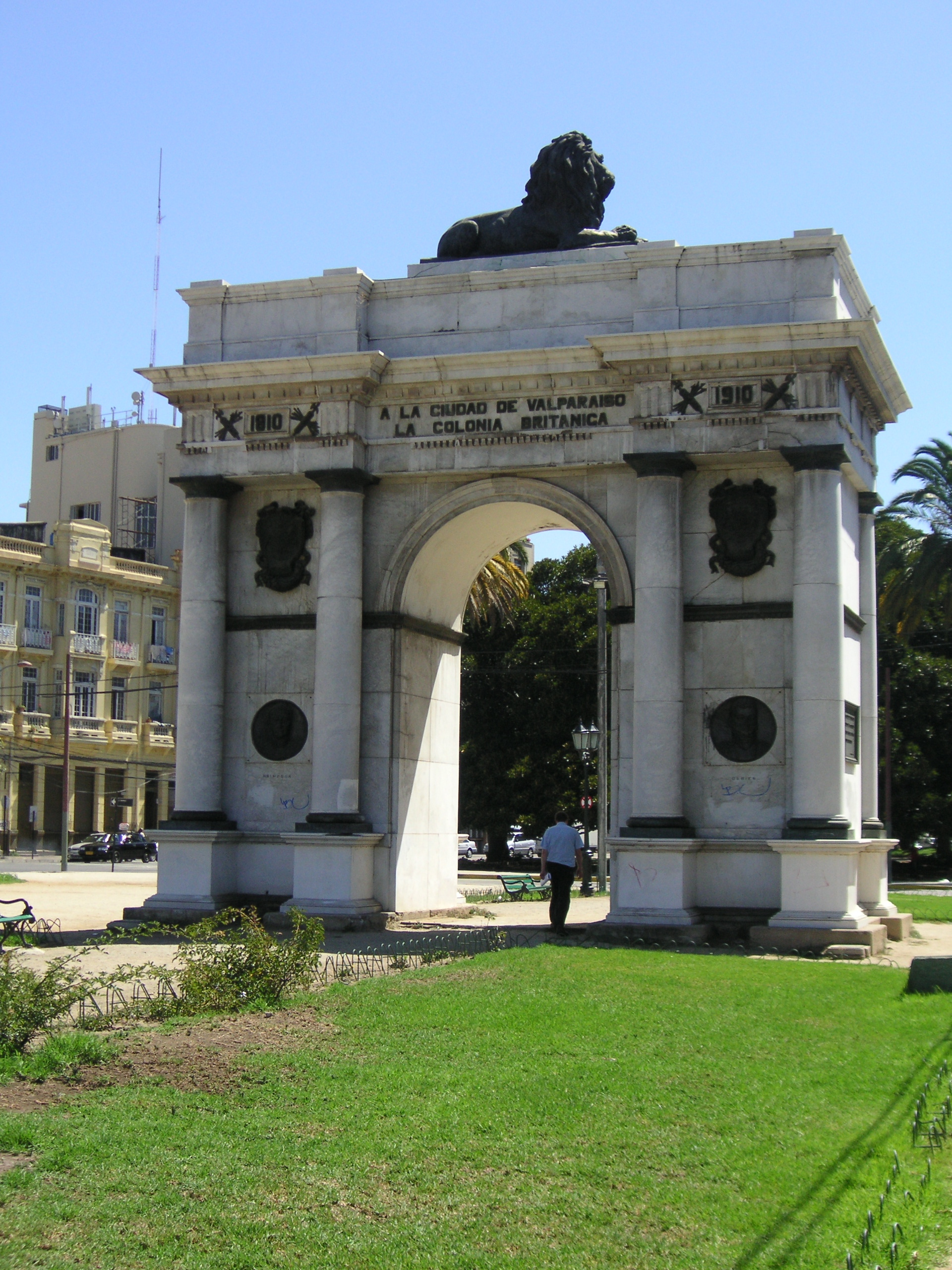
British Arch

During the second half of the 20th century, Valparaíso experienced a great decline, as wealthy families de-gentrified the historic quarter, moving to bustling Santiago or nearby Viña del Mar. By the early 1990s, much of the city's unique heritage had been lost and many Chileans had given up on the city. But in the mid-1990s, a grassroots preservation movement blossomed in Valparaíso where nowadays also a vast number of murals created by graffiti artists can be viewed on the streets, alleyways and stairways.

The Fundación Valparaíso (Valparaíso Foundation), founded by the North American poet Todd Temkin, has executed major neighborhood redevelopment projects; has improved the city's tourist infrastructure; and administers the city's jazz, ethnic music, and opera festivals; among other projects. Some noteworthy foundation projects include the World Heritage Trail, Opera by the Sea, and Chile's "Cultural Capital". During recent years, Mr. Temkin has used his influential Sunday column in El Mercurio de Valparaíso to advocate for many major policy issues, such as the creation of a "Ley Valparaíso" (Valparaíso Law) in the Chilean Congress, and the possibility that the Chilean government must guarantee funding for the preservation of Valparaíso's beloved funicular elevators.

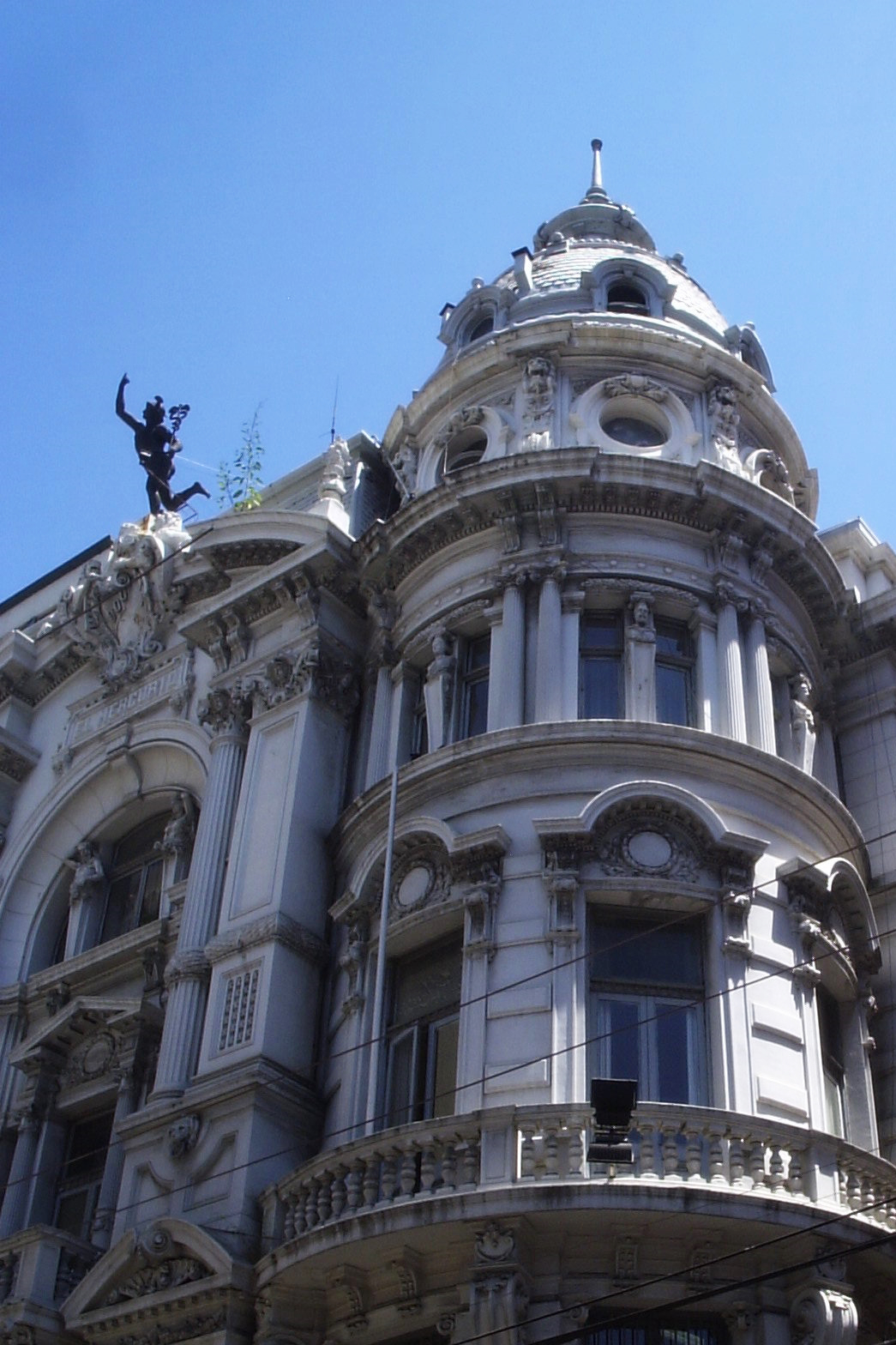
Facade of El Mercurio de Valparaíso's publishing building in Calle Esmeralda

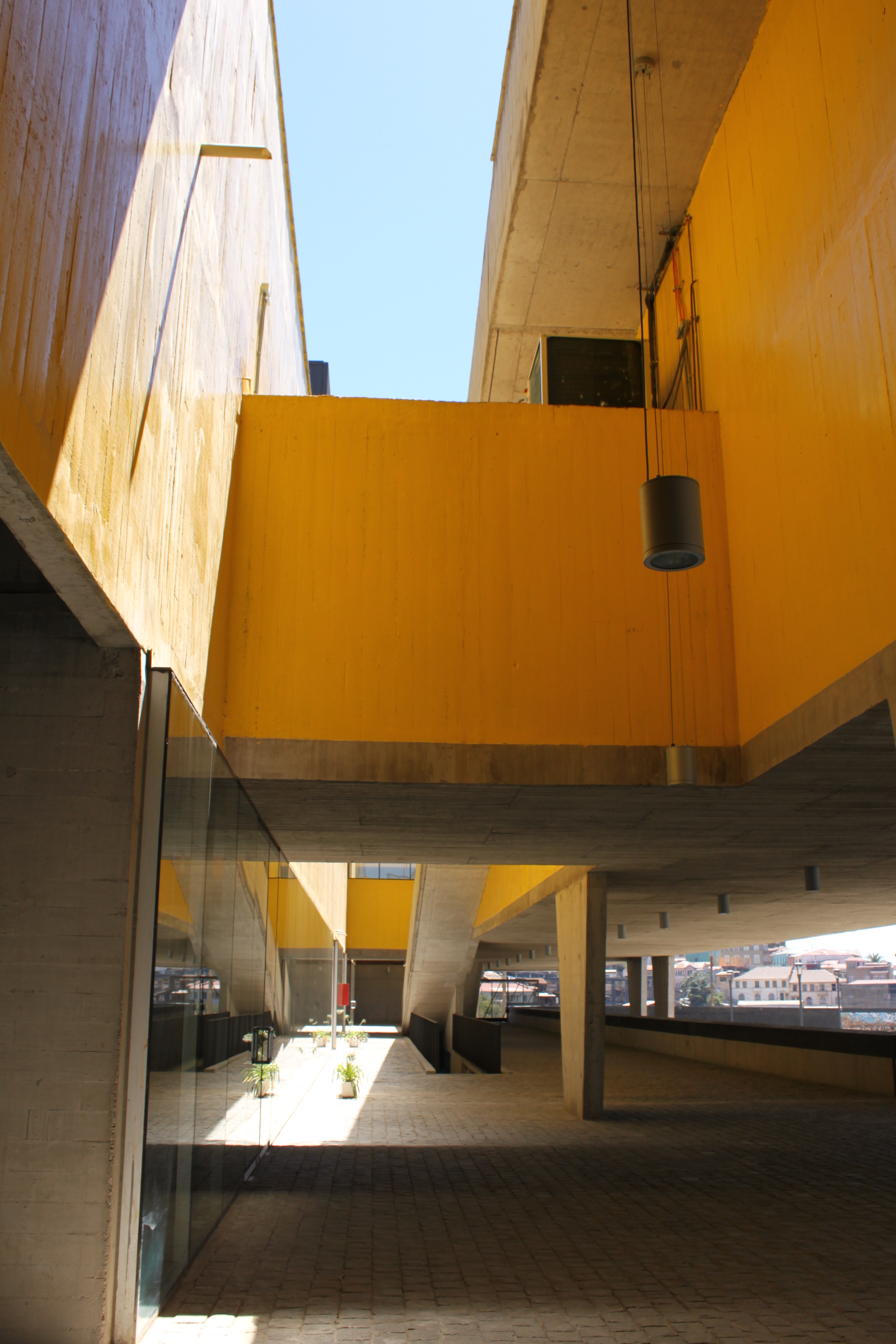
The "Broadcasting Building" of the Parque Cultural de Valparaíso (PCdV) which has been established on a former prison's ground on Cerro Cárcel

Valparaíso's newspaper, El Mercurio de Valparaíso is the oldest Spanish-language newspaper in circulation in the world.

The Fundacion LUKAS maintains the drawings and paintings of the cartoonist Renzo Antonio Giovanni Pecchenino Raggi (stage name LUKAS), who came to symbolize Valparaíso in popular culture, in a new restored building overlooking the bay.

Valparaíso is also home to the so-called "School of Valparaíso", which is in fact the Faculty of Architecture & Urbanism of the Pontificia Universidad Católica de Valparaíso. The "School of Valparaíso" was in the 1960s and 1970s one of the most experimental, avant-garde and controversial Architectural schools in the country.

Valparaíso stages a major festival attended by hundreds of thousands of participants on the last three days of every year. The festival culminates with a "New Year's by the Sea" fireworks show, the biggest in all of Latin America, attended by a million tourists who fill the coastline and hillsides with a view of the bay. Even though everyone calls it the Valparaíso Fireworks, it is, in fact, a fireworks display running along a great part of the coast from Valparaíso, past Viña del Mar and all the way to Concón.

In 2003, the Chilean Congress declared Valparaíso to be "Chile's Cultural Capital" and home for the nation's new cultural ministry.

Valparaíso is well-known for its artisans and bohemian culture, and offers various urban nightlife activities. Traditional bars and nightclubs can be found near Sotomayor Square. A vivid guide to Valparaíso can be found in the novels of Cayetano Brule, the private detective who lives in a Victorian house in the picturesque Paseo Gervasoni in Cerro Concepción.

== Health system ==
The public healthcare system mainly relies on the Hospital Carlos Van Buren located at the plan and Hospital Valparaíso (officially Hospital Eduardo Pereira) located at St. Roque Hill. There are also several clinics including Universidad de Chile's Clinica Barón, Hospital Aleman (due to close), and the former Naval Hospital on Playa Ancha Hill. Hospital Psiquiátrico del Salvador is a psychiatric hospital in Valparaíso.

== Sports ==
Valparaíso has several public sports venues and facilities, including a growing network of cycle routes.

- The Club Deportivo Playa Ancha (Playa Ancha Sports Club), located in Av. Playa Ancha 451, Cerro Playa Ancha, opened in 1919 and offers football pitches, table football, basketball and tennis courts, two swimming pools and a small gym. Tennis and swimming lessons are held in the club as well as local tournaments, and the pool can be used recreationally in summer.
- The Complejo Deportivo Escuela Naval (Naval School Sports Centre), located at General Hontaneda, Cerro Playa Ancha, offers Olympic-standard modern facilities with a heated swimming pool and indoor volleyball, basketball, gymnastics, judo, and fencing areas. It also has extensive outdoor sports facilities, suitable for rugby, football, and tennis.

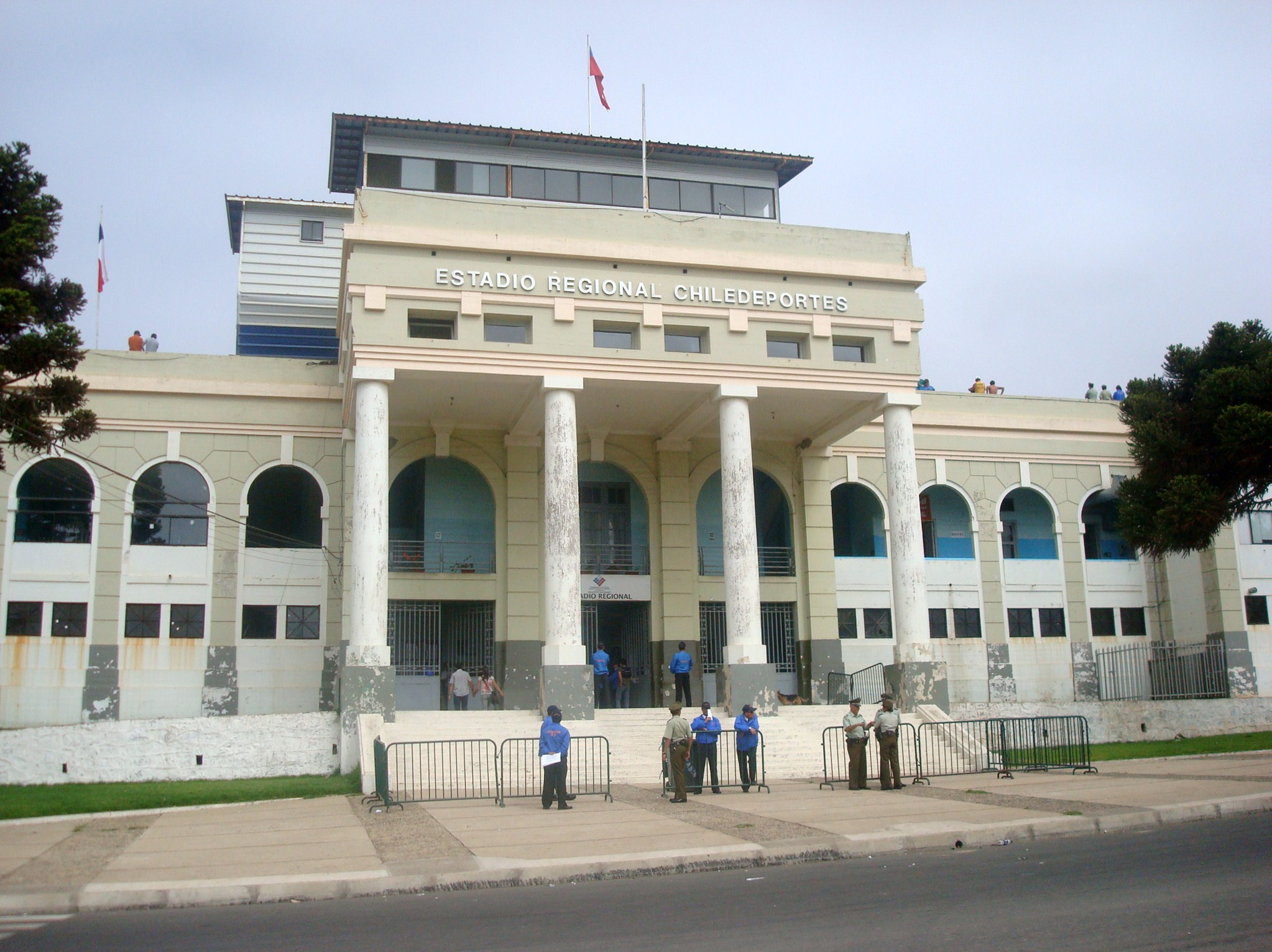
Main entrance of Estadio Elías Figueroa Brander, February 2011

- The Estadio Elías Figueroa Brander (formerly Chiledeportes Regional Stadium) is located at the junction of Hontaneda and Subida Carvallo, Cerro Playa Ancha, This stadium has historic links to the local football team, Santiago Wanderers, the oldest professional football team in Chile founded on August 15, 1892. Built in 1931, it holds 18,500 people and also serves as an athletics and swimming venue.
- Fortín Prat (Fort Prat), located at Rawson 382, Almendral, is a historic basketball venue, hosting the "golden age" of Valparaíso basketball from 1950 to 1970. Fort Prat has also hosted numerous local handball, table tennis and boxing championships. It offers children's classes and a gym, and is also home to the Valparaíso Basketball Association Museum.
- The Muelle Deportivo Curauma is located 20 minutes from Valparaíso in Lake Peñuelas at Avenue Borde Laguna and Curauma. The calm waters of the 195 km^{2} lagoon permits rowing, kayaking, fishing and boating. It has also been chosen as a venue for the 2014 South American Games. Around the lagoon are camping sites, cycle and hiking trails, and paintball and canopy facilities.
- The Puerto Deportivo Valparaíso, located at Muelle Barón, Bordemar Centro, is a watersports centre which offers sailing, kayaking and scuba diving lessons and hosts the "Valpo Sub" program that seeks to preserve the area's underwater heritage, offering educational tours and expeditions to shipwrecks along the bay. Puerto Deportivo Valparaíso also carries out programs promoting ecotourism in Valparaíso Bay, and rents equipment for people having lessons. It features an interactive room that shows information on the underwater heritage.
- The Velódromo Roberto Parra is located opposite the Club Deportivo Playa Ancha and is part of its wider complex. The velodrome contains a cycle track, table football, and handball and basketball courts. All its facilities are available for public rent.

Valparaíso was one of the host cities of the official 1959 Basketball World Cup, where Chile won the bronze medal.

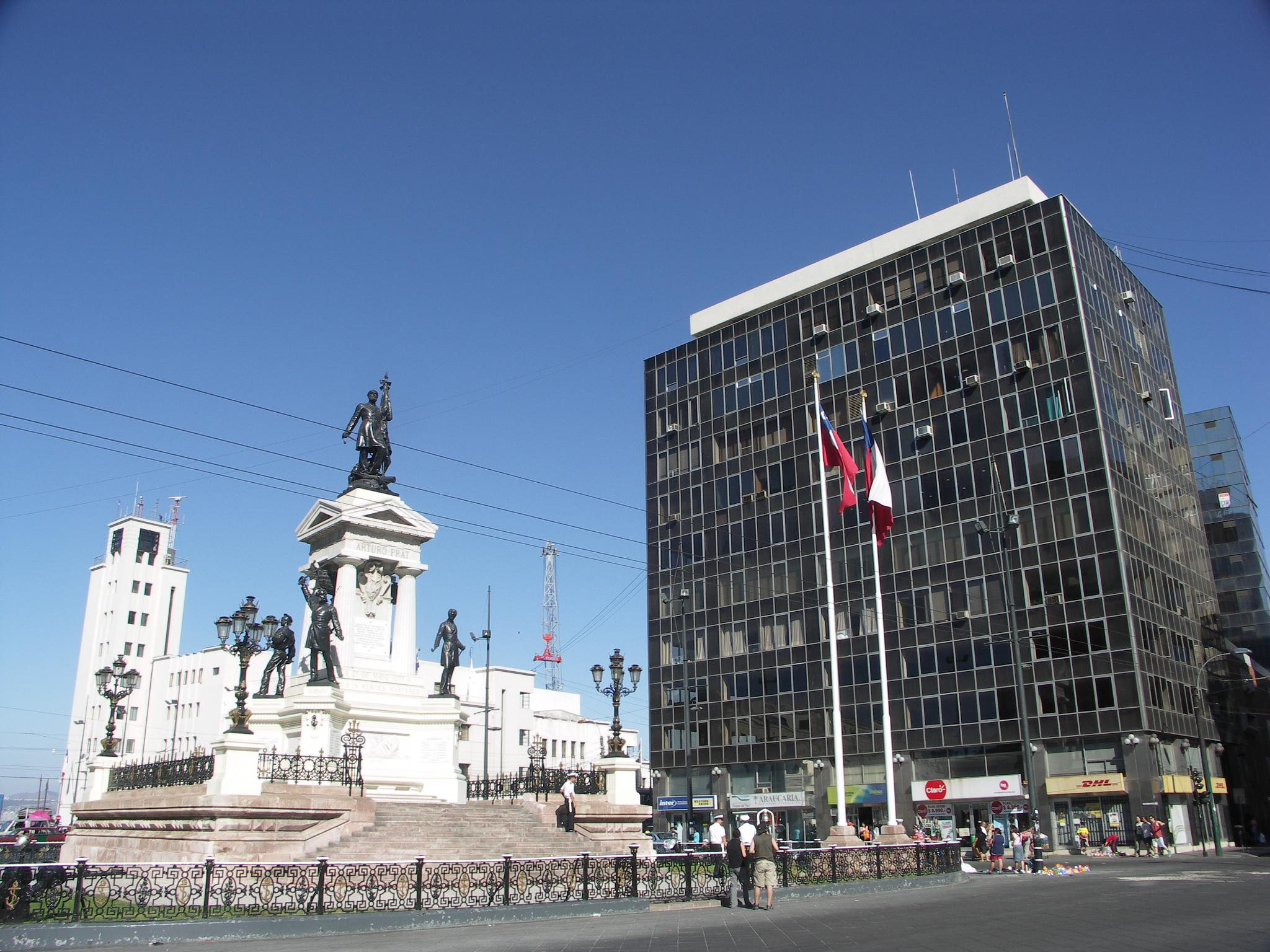
Sotomayor Square with the monument of the heroes of the Battle of Iquique

The "Valparaíso Downhill" is a mountain bike race that takes place in February. Riders race through the city streets tackling the steps and alleys, finding their own way through the ramps and jumps down to the "plan" (Valparaíso's "lowlands"). The Valparaíso Downhill has been described by Chop MTB as "the craziest urban downhill race of all".

Since 2005, a series of running events has taken place in the city with 5 km, 10 km, 21 km and marathon distances. The race starts at Muelle Barón and the course runs along the seafront, crossing diverse architectural and geographical landmarks.

The final stage of the 2014 Dakar Rally ended up at Valparaíso's Sotomayor Square in the heart of the old town, surrounded by historic buildings. Ignacio Casale, the Chilean winner of the 2014 Quad category, was cheered here in the streets by the Valparaíso crowd.

== Education ==
=== Educational establishments ===
At primary school level, Valparaíso boasts some of the most emblematic schools in the region, such as the Liceo Eduardo de la Barra and Salesian College Valparaíso. Other landmarks of the city schools are the Mary Help of Christians School, San Rafael Seminary, the Lycée Jean d'Alembert, Colegio San Pedro Nolasco, Scuola Italiana Arturo Dell' Oro and Deutsche Schule Valparaíso, among others. Many of the schools named in the plan are located directly in the city, especially in the Almendral neighborhood.

In addition, Valparaíso was the birthplace of many private schools founded by the European colonies, as the German School, the Alliance Francaise, Mackay College (now located in the neighboring resort of Viña del Mar) and the College of the Sacred Hearts of Valparaíso, that operating since 1837 is the oldest private school in South America.

=== University establishments ===
Valparaíso has many institutions of higher education, including some of the most important universities of Chile, called "traditional universities", like the Pontifical Catholic University of Valparaíso, the University of Valparaíso, the Playa Ancha University and the Federico Santa María Technical University. The main building of this last is visible from much of the city, as it is located on the front of the hill 'Cerro Placeres', and has characteristic Tudor Gothic and Renaissance architecture. The city has many nontraditional colleges of varying size, quality and focus.

University	Foundation	Acronym	Type
Federico Santa María Technical University	1931	UTFSM/USM	Private university Traditional
Pontifical Catholic University of Valparaíso	1925	UCV/PUCV	Private university Traditional
Playa Ancha University of Educational Sciences	1948	UPLA	Public university
University of Valparaíso	1981	UV	Public university

== Notable residents ==
Valparaíso is the birthplace of many historically significant figures, including:

- Abelardo Quinteros, Chilean composer
- Augusto Pinochet, general and dictator of Chile
- Camilo Mori, Chilean painter
- Esteban Orlando Harrington, Chilean architect
- Matias Novoa, Chilean-Mexican actor
- Claudio Naranjo, Chilean psychiatrist
- Chris Watson, Australia's third Prime Minister, and the first Australian Labour Prime Minister
- Curt Echtermeyer, also known as Curt Bruckner (1896–1971), German painter
- Percy John Daniell, English mathematician
- Marsia Alexander-Clarke, American artist
- Roberto Ampuero, author of the internationally published novels about the private eye Cayetano Brulé and "Hijo Ilustre" of Valparaíso, Foreign Minister of Chile
- Giancarlo Monsalve, Chilean international opera singer, Cultural Ambassador of Valparaíso and UNESCO medal
- Sergio Badilla Castillo, Chilean poet, founder of poetic transrealism in contemporary poetry
- Ernestina Pérez Barahona, Chilean physician
- Elvira Santa Cruz Ossa, Chilean dramatist and novelist
- Alicia Herrera Rivera, feminist lawyer, minister of the Court of Appeals of Santiago
- Juana López (nurse), Chilean army nurse
- J. G. Robertson, English singer and actor
- José Maza Sancho, Chilean astronomer
- Sergio Larraín, Chilean photographer
- Jorge Dip, lawyer and politician, governor of the province of Valparaíso

It has also been the residence of many writers such as the Chilean poet Pablo Neruda, the Nicaraguan poet Rubén Darío and the American poet Marion Manville Pope.

Puerto Rican pro-independence leader Segundo Ruiz Belvis died in the city in November 1867.

== See also ==
- Great Fire of Valparaíso
- Valparaíso school shootings
