= Barón funicular =

National monument of Chile

Coordinates: 33°02′35″S 71°36′15″W

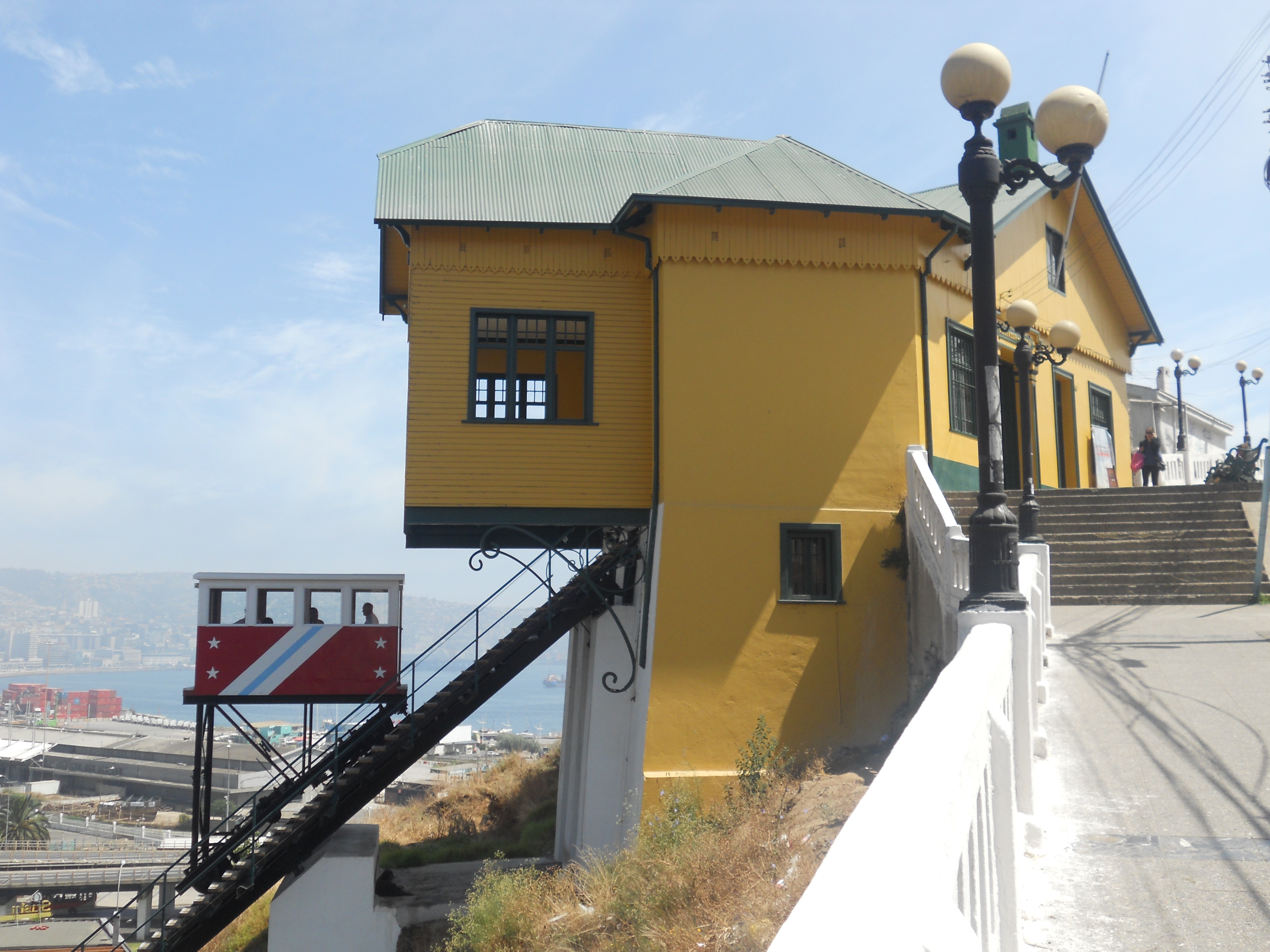

Overview
- Native name: Ascensor Barón
- Status: In operation
- Locale: Valparaíso, Chile

Service
- Type: Funicular
- Services: 1

The Barón funicular (Spanish: Ascensor Barón), built in 1906, is a funicular located on its namesake hill in Valparaíso, Chile, and was declared a Historic Monument on 1 September 1998.

== Description ==
The Barón funicular has great urban significance by virtue of being the connection between the Plan de Valparaíso with one of the most tourist scenic viewpoints in the eastern section of the natural amphitheater where sits the city. This viewpoint formed part of the old road to Quillota, which joined Valparaíso to the hacienda of the Siete Hermanas (the land currently occupied by the city of Viña del Mar). Its altitude ranges between 5 and 35 m (16.4 and 114.8 ft) above sea level. The track length is 55 m (180.4 ft) and the journey time is 95 seconds.

Located on the Barón Hill, the funicular connects the España and Argentina avenues, on the flat part of the city, with the Diego Portales street of the hill. It is nearby the Barón Station, which is connected to the rest of the metropolitan area.

Inaugurated on 17 April 1909, its first owner was the defunct Compañía de Tracción Eléctrica (CTE). It was the first electrical funicular in the city, system that replaced the previous water counterbalance system. The electric engine was brought from Germany.

This funicular, along with the Reina Victoria, was owned by the Empresa de Transportes Colectivos del Estado (which was also owner of the dismantled Ascensor Placeres), before being bought by the Municipality of Valparaíso.

Like the other surviving funiculars of Valparaíso, it was declared a Historic Monument.

== See also ==
- Funicular railway
- Funicular railways of Valparaíso
- List of funicular railways
