= San Francisco Church =

San Francisco Church may refer to:

- San Francisco Church (Valparaíso), Chile
- San Francisco Church (Antigua Guatemala), Guatemala
- San Francisco Church (Intramuros), Philippines
- San Francisco Church (La Paz), Bolivia
- San Francisco Church, Santiago de Chile, Chile

== See also ==
- Roman Catholic Archdiocese of San Francisco, California
- Roman Catholic Diocese of San Francisco, Argentina
- Category:Churches in San Francisco, California
