= Avenida España =

Avenida España, or España Avenue may refer to:

- Avenida España (Trujillo), Peru
- Avenida España (Valparaíso), coastal road from Valparaíso to neighboring Viña del Mar, Chile
- Avenida España (es), in Asunción, Paraguay
- Avenida España, Lima, Peru
- Avenida de España (es), Albacete, Spain
- Avenida Calle 100 (also called Avenida España Usaquén), Calle 100 (TransMilenio) Bogotá, Colombia
- Avenida España, Cuenca, Azuay, Ecuador; track of the 2001 Pan American Race Walking Cup

== See also ==
- Bulevar España, Montevideo
- España Boulevard 8-lane major thoroughfare in Metro Manila
