= Valparaíso funiculars =

Cable railways in Valparaiso, Chile

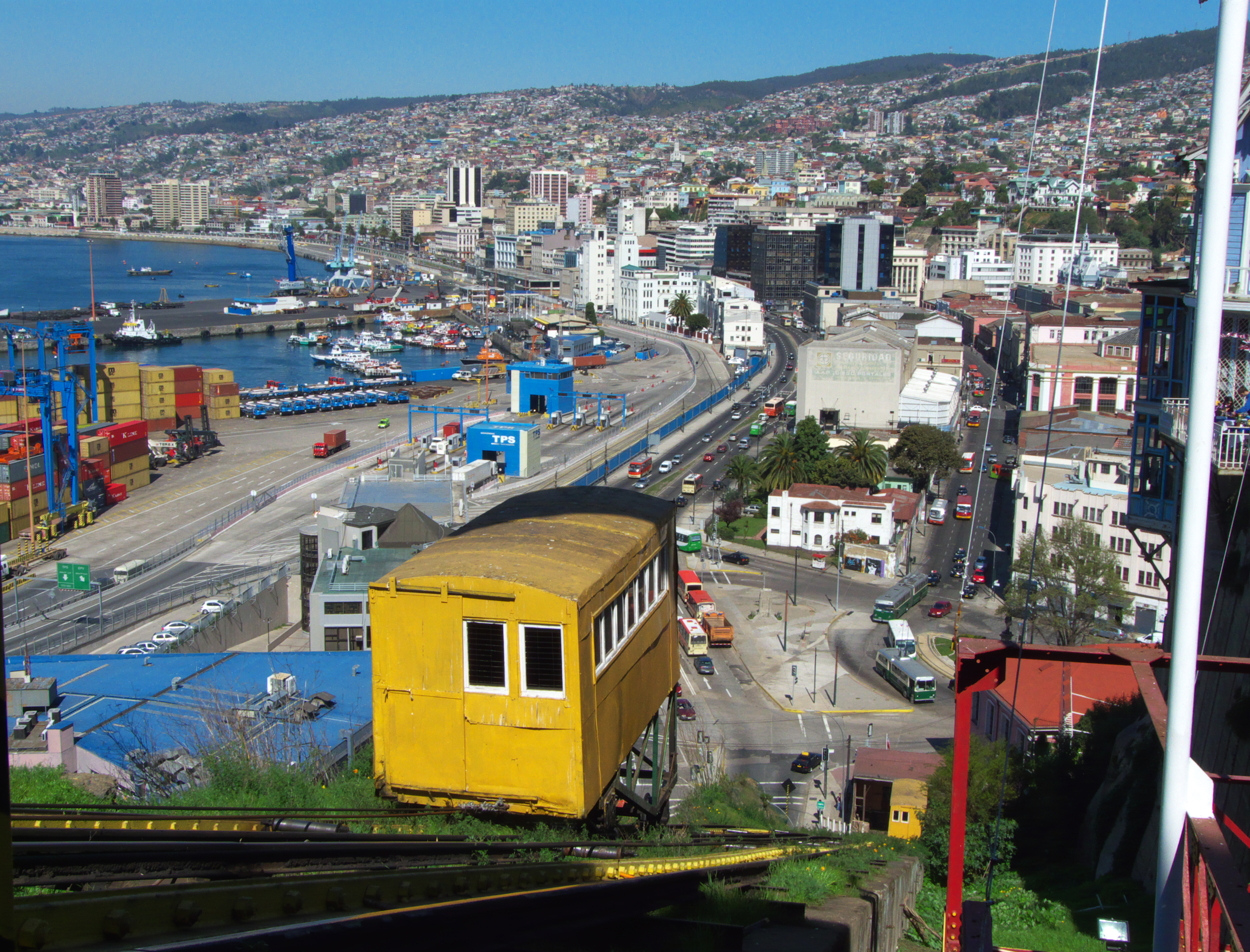
View of Valparaíso from the top of the Artillería funicular railway

There are 16 extant historical elevators (Spanish: ascensores) in the city of Valparaíso in Chile. Technically most of these elevators are bona fide funiculars. Only one of them, the Ascensor Polanco, is a true vertical elevator. They were mainly constructed in the late 19th and early 20th centuries.

== Description ==
Valparaíso in Chile, due to the number of hills above the so-called plan has had up to 30 ascensores. Only 16 of them remained extant today and they are declared National Monuments of Chile.

These extant ascensores are a part of the Historic Quarter of the Seaport City of Valparaíso site which since 2003 is included into the UNESCO's World Heritage List.

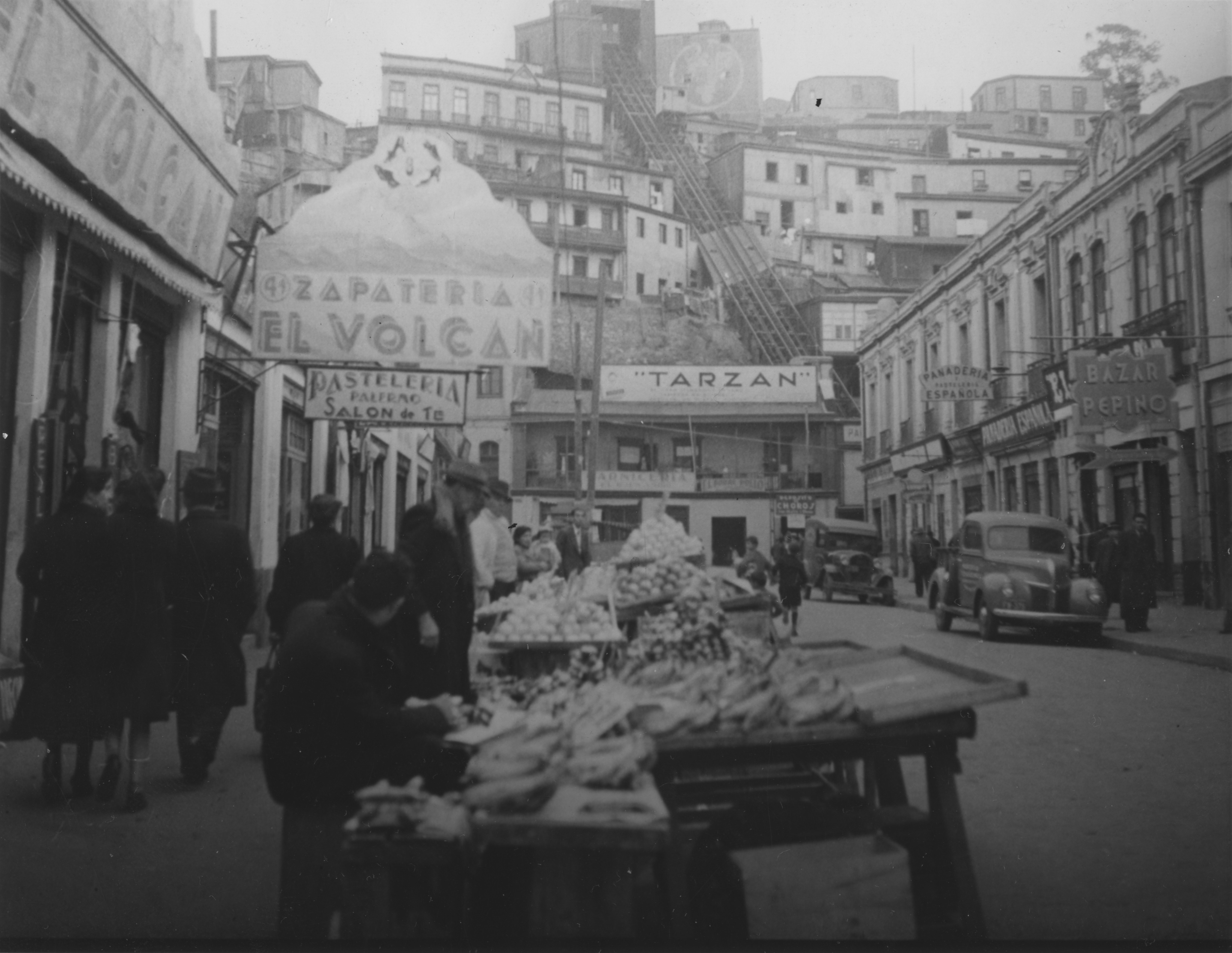
The Lecheros funicular in 1941

Below is a list of known elevators (funiculars and the lift) in Valparaiso.

Number from west	Name	Hill name	Date opened	Date closed	notes
03	Arrayán	Cerro Santo Domingo	1905	1964	
02	Artillería	Cerro Artillería	1893		Operating
25	Barón	Cerro Barón	1906		Operating
13	Bellavista	Cerro Bellavista	1897	1955	
09	Concepción	Cerro Concepción	1883		Operating
06	Cordillera	Cerro Cordillera	1887		Under renovation
21	El Hogar		1912	1955	
08	El Peral	Cerro Alegre	1902		Operating
10	Esmeralda	Cerro Concepción	1905	1962	
14	Espíritu Santo		1911		Operating
15	Florida		1906		Under renovation
00	Hospital Carlos van Buren		1929		Under renovation
18	La Cruz	Cerro La Cruz	1908	1992	
23	Larraín	Cerro Rodríguez	1906		Under renovation
17	Monjas		1912		Under renovation (since 2009)
24	Lecheros		1906	2007	
16	Mariposas	Cerro Mariposas	1904		Under renovation (since 2009)
12	Panteón		1900	1952	
05	Perdices	Cerro Arrayán	1932	1962	
26	Placeres	Cerro Placeres	1913	1971	
19	Polanco	Cerro Polanco	1913-1916		Operating
20	Ramaditas		1914	1955	
11	Reina Victoria	Cerro Alegre	1902		Operating
07	San Agustin	Cerro Cordillera	1913		Operating
04	Santo Domingo	Cerro Santo Domingo	1910	1965	
01	Villaseca	Cerro Artillería	1907		Under renovation (since 2006)
00	Villanelo (Viña del Mar)		1983		Operating

External images
- The funiculars of Valparaíso on Google Street View
- Villaseca
- Artillería
- Cordillera
- San Agustin
- El Peral
- Concepción
- Reina Victoria
- Espíritu Santo
- Florida
- Mariposas
- Monjas
- Hospital Carlos van Buren
- Larrain
- Lecheros
- Barón
- Villanelo
- For Google Street View images of the Polanco elevator see its own article.

== See also ==
- Trolleybuses in Valparaíso
- Valparaíso Metro
