= Ascensor Mariposas =

National monument of Chile

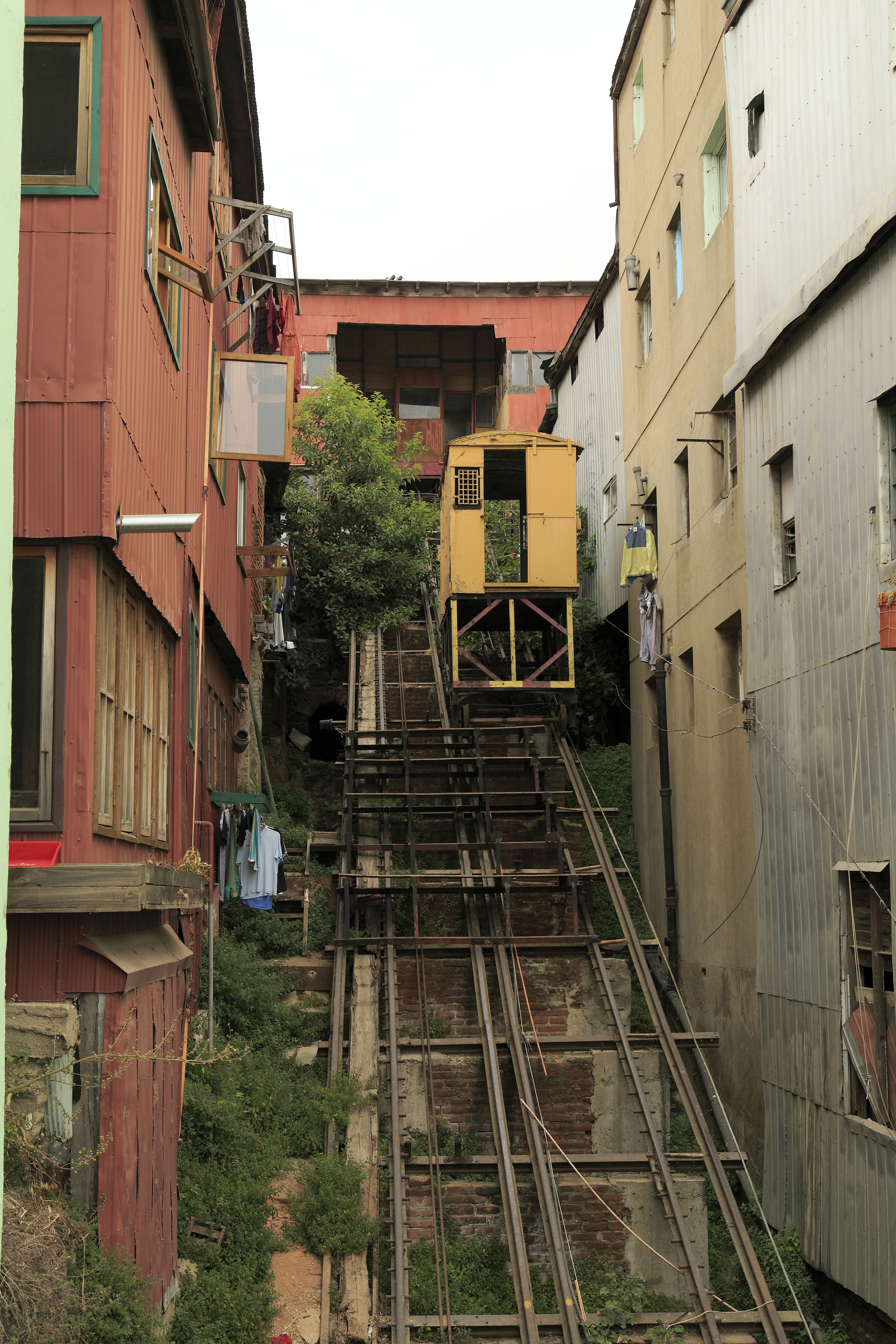
- View from Baquedano street

Overview
- Locale: Cerro Mariposas, Valparaíso, Valparaíso Region, Chile

History
- Completed: 1906; 119 years ago

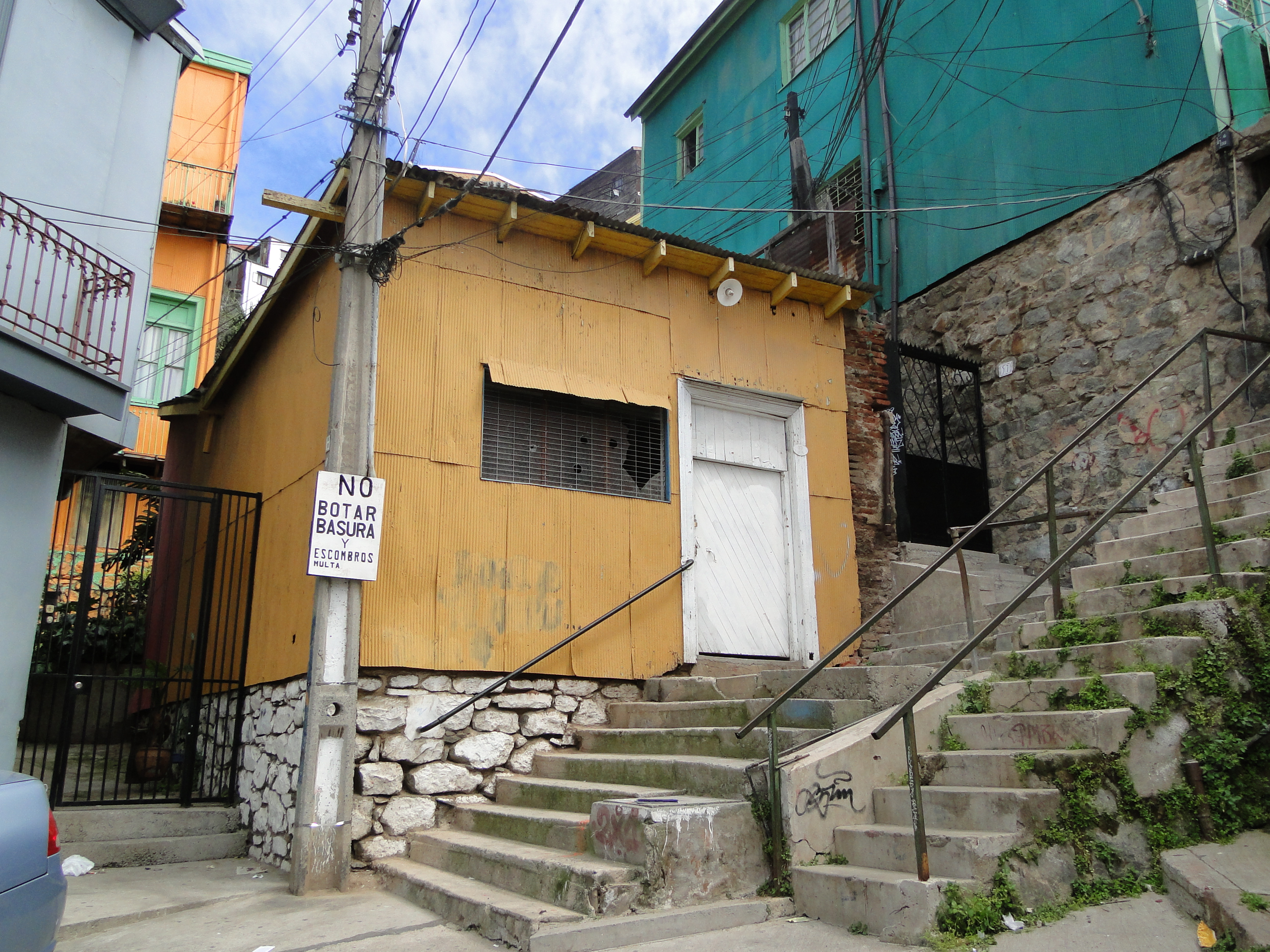
Entrance to the lower station

The Ascensor Mariposas is one of the 15 funiculars left in Valparaíso, Chile. Inaugurated in 1906, its route is flanked by houses and shrubs and its upper terminus is a street on the Mariposas Hill. Baquedano street passes over the tracks of the funicular. It was declared as a National Monument of Chile in 1998, within the category of Historic Monuments.

== History ==
The funicular was inaugurated in 1906. It has the longest route of funicular railways in Valparaíso.

The funicular, along with the Florida and the Monjas, was closed in September 2009 due to very low profit margins or losses generated for its owners.

Since 2012, the Chilean Government is responsible for the maintenance of the funicular, which acquired, along with other nine, for refurbishment purposes and to be put back into operation.

== Description ==
The lower station of the funicular is located at the western end of Gaspar Marín street, on the plan de Valparaíso. Its upper station faces Paseo Barbosa (Barbosa Promenade), a secondary street of the Mariposas Hill. Its rails rest on the hill supported by railroad ties.

The railway track structure has an overall length of 177 m (581 ft), with a slope of 25 degrees and an elevation difference of 46 m (151 ft). The capacity is 10 passengers per car, and its route is approximately 160 m (520 ft) long. Moreover, the funicular reaches an altitude of 80 m (260 ft) above sea level, which is among the highest of the funiculars of the city. The land occupied by the funicular complex on sloped terrain is 92 m^{2} (990 sq ft), whilst on flat terrain is 70 m^{2} (750 sq ft). The upper station covers an area of 290 m^{2} (3,100 sq ft), whilst the lower station covers 27 m^{2} (290 sq ft).

== See also ==
- Funicular railway
- Funicular railways of Valparaíso
- List of funicular railways
- Valparaíso
