= Ascensor Concepción =

National monument of Chile

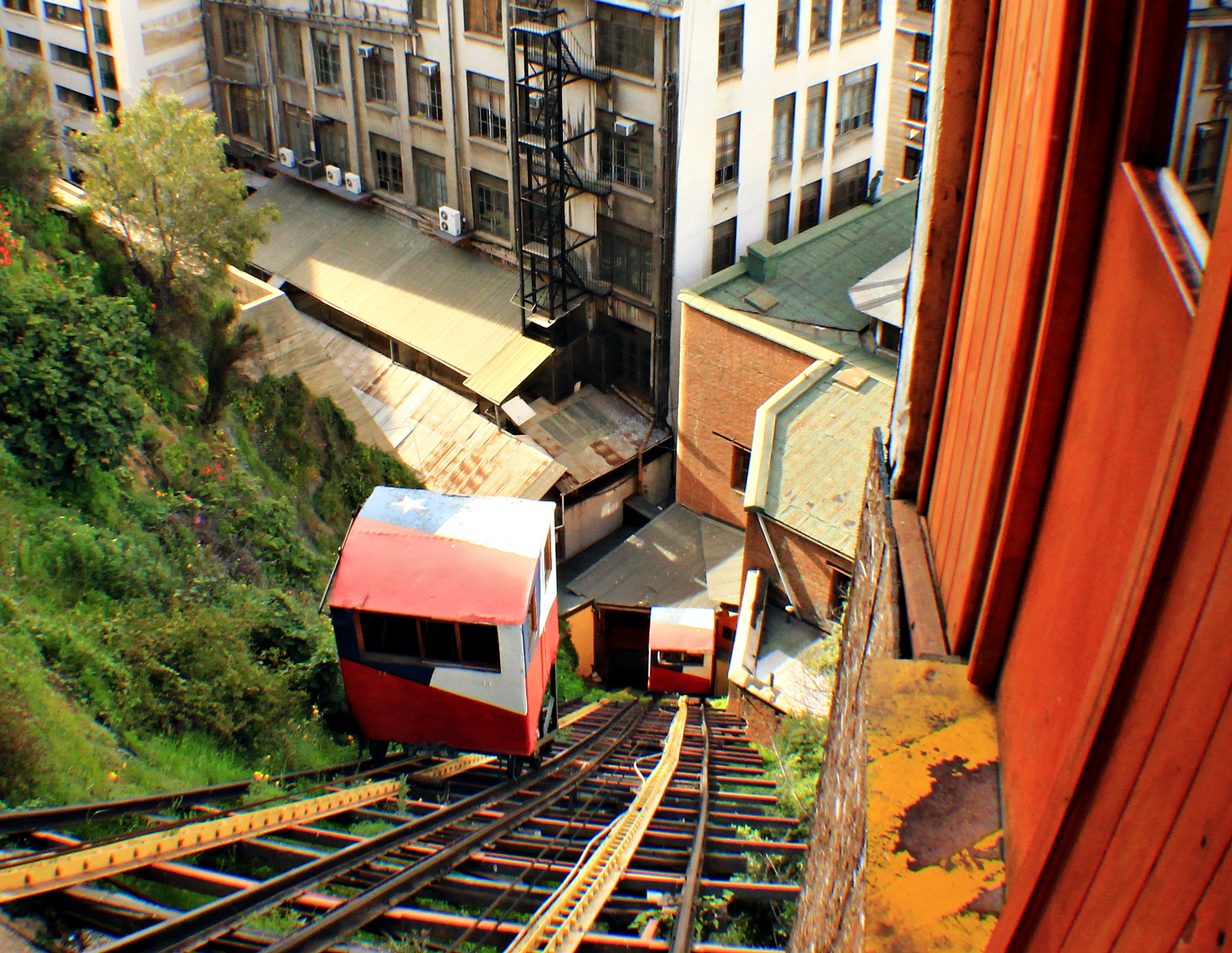

Overview
- Native name: Ascensor Concepción
- Status: Operating

Service
- Type: Funicular
- Services: 1

The Ascensor Concepción is the oldest of the funiculars of Valparaíso, Chile. Inaugurated on December 1, 1883, It connects the Elías Alley, which faces the Reloj Turri on the Plan de Valparaíso, with the Gervasoni Promenade on the Concepción Hill. The funicular was declared a Historic Monument on September 1, 1998.

== History ==
In 1882, the Compañía de Ascensores Mecánicos de Valparaíso was established to build a new mode of transport for the use of the residents of the Concepción Hill, which was inaugurated on December 1, 1883 by the authorities of the city.

The funicular originally consisted of two wooden cars moved by a water counterbalance system, which, years after, was changed to one powered by electricity. At the same time, the wooden cars were replaced by metal cars.

As a way of heritage preservation, in 2012, the government of Sebastián Piñera acquired the Ascensor Concepción, along with other nine ones, from private owners to be given to the municipality of Valparaíso under commodate. The restoration works on the funicular, under the supervision of the Ministerio de Obras Públicas, began on December 5, 2016 and were completed on April 3, 2019.

== Description ==
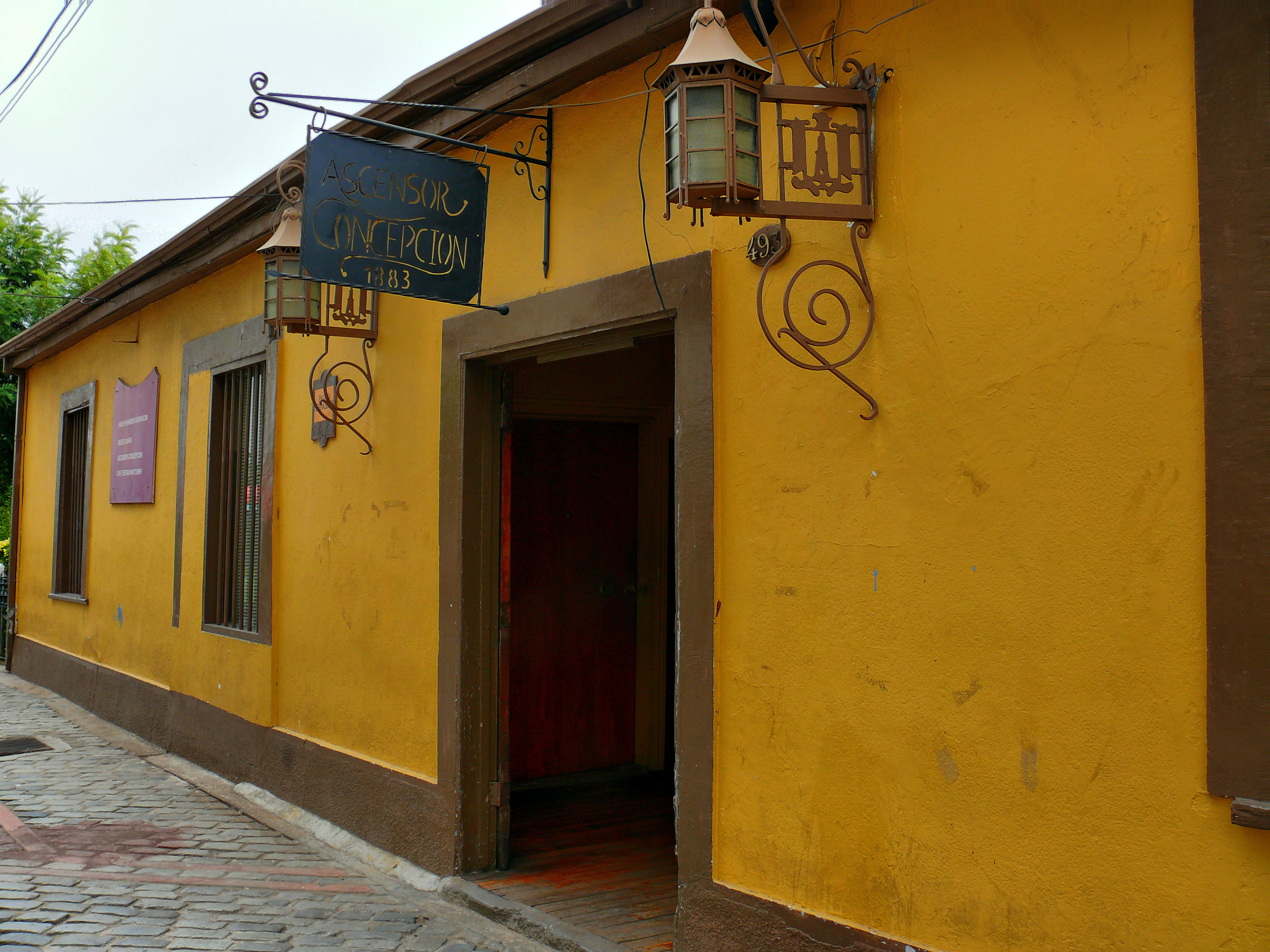
The upper station fronting Paseo Gervasoni.

The lower station is located at southern end of the Pasaje Elías, a narrow alley lined by buildings facing the Reloj Turri on the south side of the Prat Street. The upper station faces the Paseo Gervasoni of the Cerro Concepción.

The funicular has a total railway length of 69 m (226 ft), and climbs to the upper station at 47 m (154 ft) above sea level. Its rails rest on a slope of the hill, and are inclined at a 46-degree angle, and its two cars carry 7 passengers each.

== See also ==
- Funicular railway
- Funicular railways of Valparaíso
- List of funicular railways
- Valparaíso
