= Barón Hill =

Hill in Valparaíso, Chile

Coordinates: 33°02′29″S 71°35′57″W

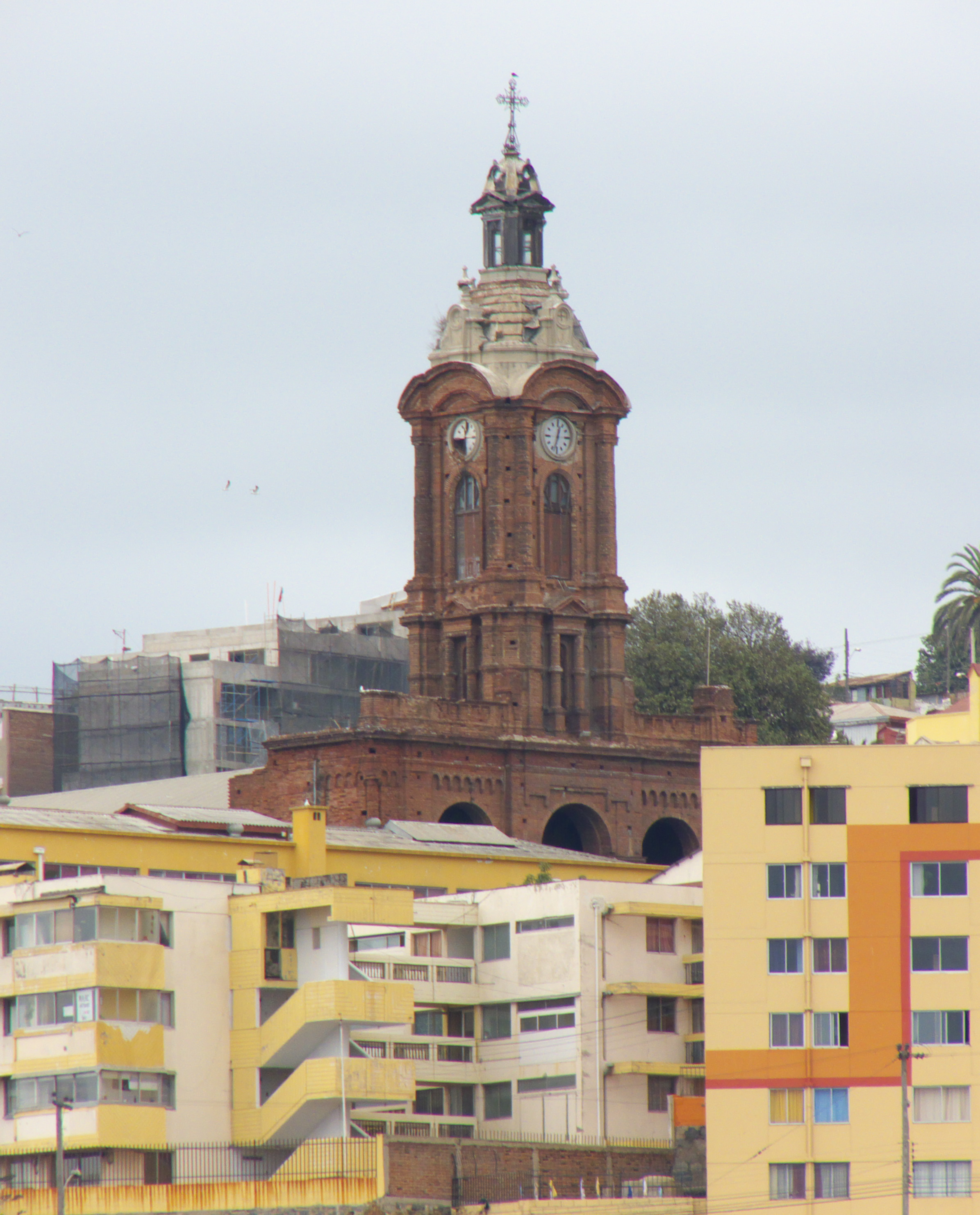
San Francisco Church, Valparaíso

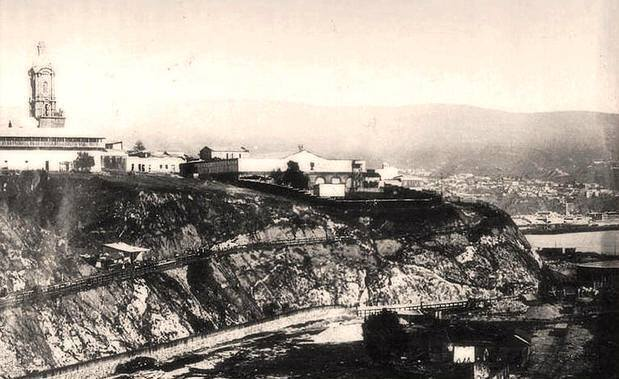
Barón hill during the 19th century

Barón Hill (Spanish: Cerro Barón) is one of the 42 hills of the city of Valparaiso, Chile. It is located on the east end of the flat region of the city, next to Dairy Hill, and is a purely residential area. In 1795 the location was built up as a fort to protect the area of El Almendral and the northern part of the bay from pirate attacks. The name of the hill was given when the city council decided to pay tribute to governor Ambrosio O'Higgins who held the title of Baron of Ballenary, naming the fort as the Fort of Baron Ballenary and giving the name to the hill.

Its development began with the development of the sector of El Almendral and construction in 1852, as well as the station armory Baron, the first railway station of Valparaiso to Santiago. Besides the hill is a path to the city of Quillota. The hill has hosted many Italian immigrants who had business in Valparaíso's flat region.

On the hill is the Church of San Francisco, responsible for the nickname of "Pancho" given to Valparaiso, as it was very recognizable among sailors who came to the city. It is also the location of the Baron elevator, built in 1906.
