= Cárcel Hill, Valparaíso =

Cultural center in Chile

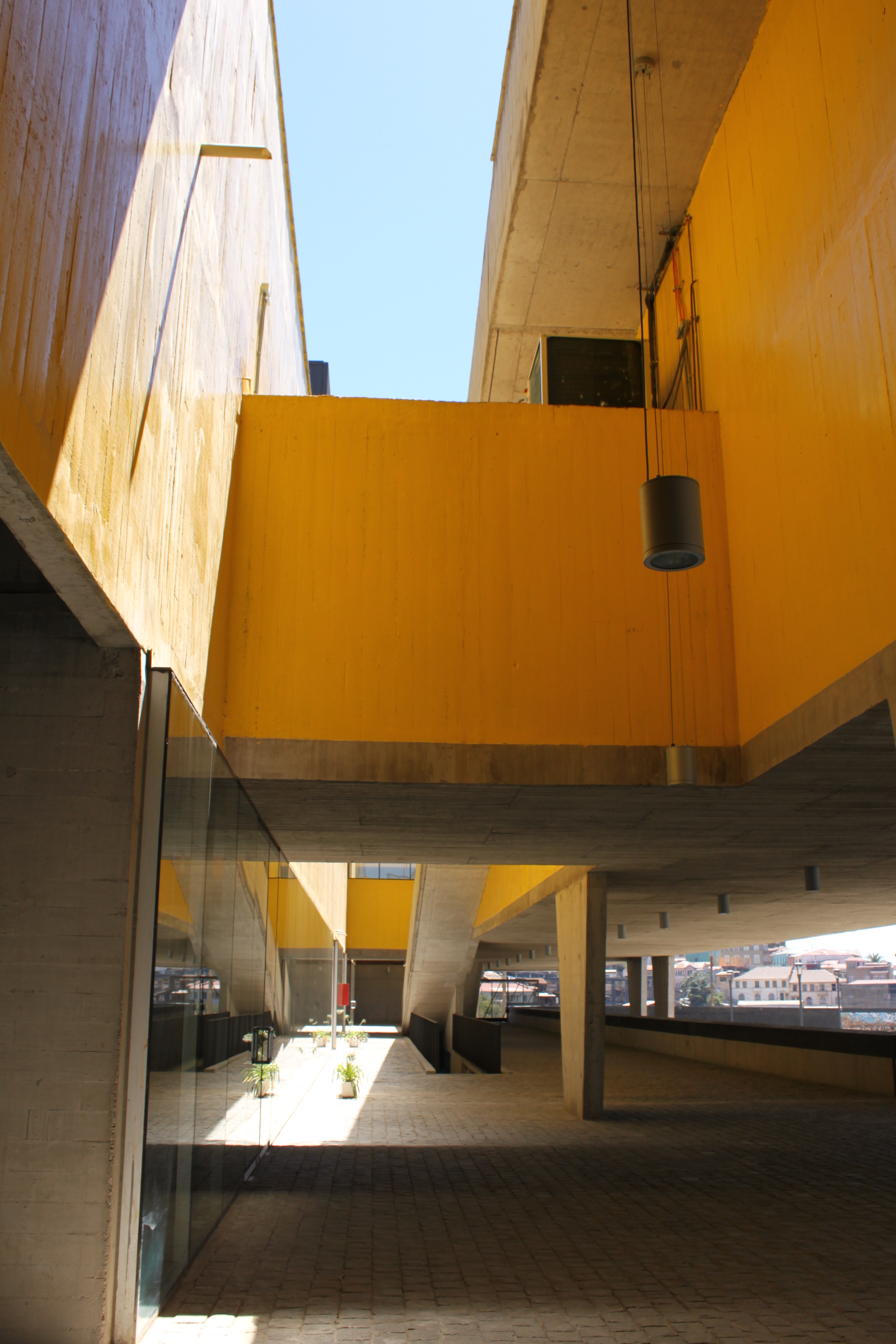
The "Broadcasting Building" of the Parque Cultural de Valparaíso (PCdV) which has been established on a former prison's ground on Cerro Cárcel.

Cárcel Hill (Cerro Cárcel) is one of the 42 hills of Valparaíso, Chile. It is the site of the city's old infamous prison, which has now been turned into an urban cultural center.
