= Great Fire of Valparaíso =

2014 natural disaster in Chile

Great Fire of Valparaíso Gran Incendio de Valparaíso
- Date: 12–16 April 2014
- Location: Camino La Pólvora, Valparaíso, Chile
- Coordinates: 33.085°S 71.630°W

Statistics
- Burned area: 800 ha (3.089 sq mi; 800.0 ha)
- Land use: Vegetation, housing, informal landfill

Impacts
- Deaths: 15
- Injuries: 10 serious, 500 slight
- Structures lost: At least 2,500

Ignition
- Cause: Under investigation
- Motive: Unknown

The Great Fire of Valparaíso (Spanish: Gran Incendio de Valparaíso) started on 12 April 2014 at 16:40 local time (19:40 UTC), in the hills of the city of Valparaíso, Chile. The wildfire destroyed at least 2,500 homes, leaving 11,000 people homeless. An additional 6,000 people were evacuated from the city, which was placed on red alert and declared a disaster zone. Fifteen people were confirmed killed and ten suffered serious injuries.

== Origin ==
An investigation by the Chilean police took place to determine the origin of the Valparaíso wildfire. The police believe that it may have originated south of the Camino La Pólvora area, and southwest of Parque del Puerto cemetery. ONEMI officials have reported "the fire was started by the intervention of third parties". It is also thought that contact by birds on an electrical transmission cable may have generated the initial spark for the wildfire, but an investigation by electricity provider company Chilquinta stated that the incineration of black vultures or any other birds was unlikely to have started the fire.

== Development ==
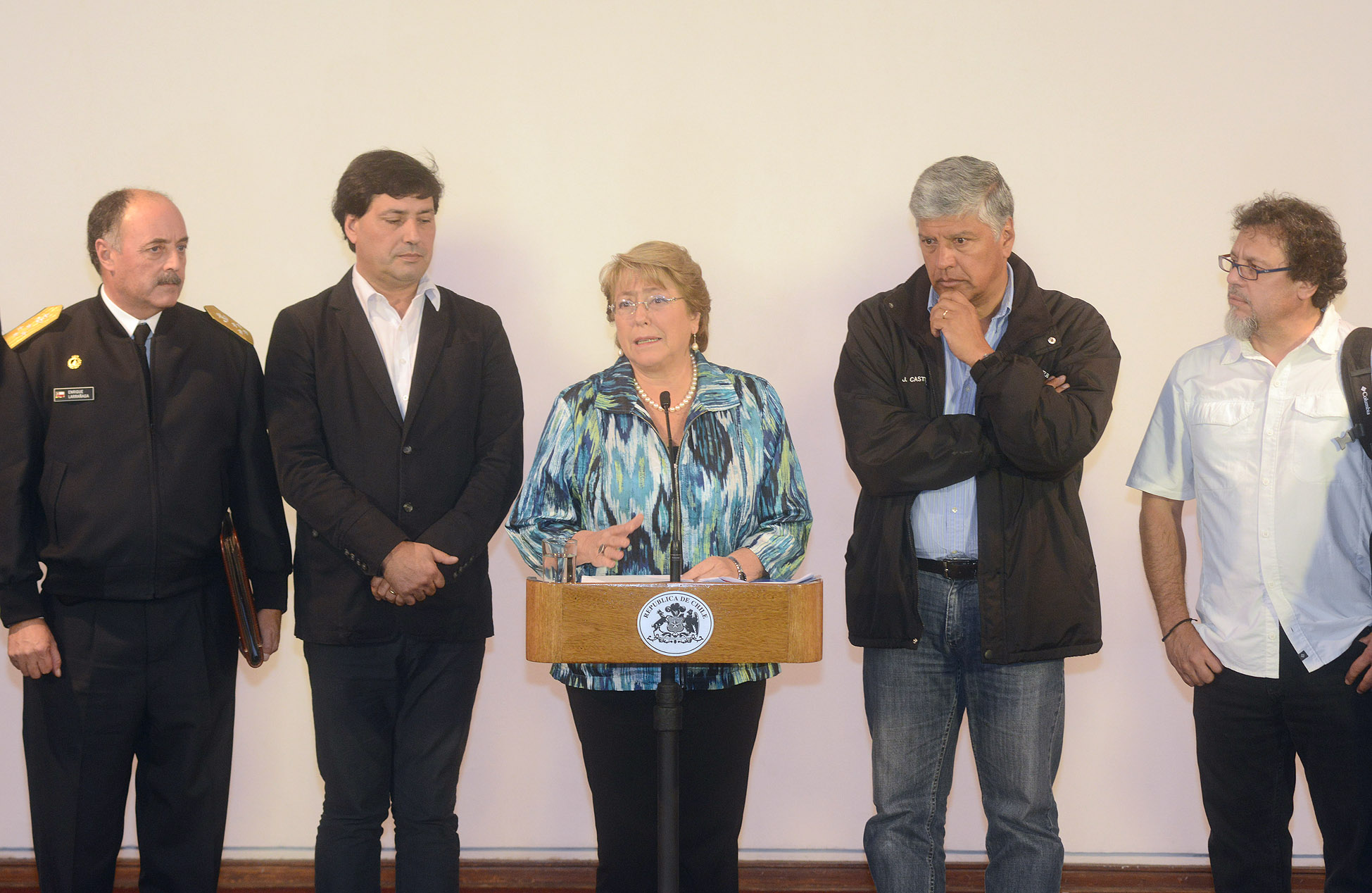
President Michelle Bachelet during a press conference about the wildfire

The wildfire started on the afternoon of 12 April at 16:40 local time (19:40 UTC) in the Camino La Pólvora area near the El Molle dump in the commune of Valparaíso. As an initial measure, the Regional Government of Valparaíso (Intendencia de Valparaíso), along with the ONEMI (Oficina Nacional de Emergencia del Ministerio del Interior) and the CONAF (Corporación Nacional Forestal), declared red alert in the commune. The fire, however, grew uncontrolled, and affected several houses. Subsequently, the Chilean government declared Valparaíso a disaster zone, which was later expanded to a state of constitutional exception, which allowed the Chilean Army to take control of the city, with the purpose of guarding the people's safety and maintaining public order. Several areas of the city were evacuated.

During the wildfire, there were at least six general power outages in the city, which occurred between 18:00 and 01:00 local time, making it more difficult to extinguish the fire. This also made it easier for thieves to loot abandoned and damaged homes as a result of the evacuation. The fire is now regarded as the most catastrophic in the city's history. President Michelle Bachelet confirmed that "it may be the worst fire in the history of Valparaíso" and did not rule out that the number of victims and the damage estimate could increase as the ruins are inspected to determine the number of destroyed houses. She also sent "a message of support to all those hundreds of families who lost their homes, their things, and in some cases, their loved ones". It was reported that many Valparaíso residents were suffering from smoke inhalation. the impoverished neighbourhoods of Mariposa and La Cruz hills were the most affected areas.

ONEMI reported that at least 850 hectares of vegetation (grassland, scrub and eucalyptus) were destroyed, and that twelve helicopters and three air tankers were struggling against the fire outbreaks that were still active in some hills. In total, according to the state organization, around 3,500 people from the CONAF, firefighters, police (carabineros de Chile), the army, health services and the ONEMI itself are working to combat and control the wildfire. The ONEMI has also sent trucks with mattresses, blankets, water, masks, tents and food rations for the victims of the wildfire, hosted in three schools and a Catholic church.

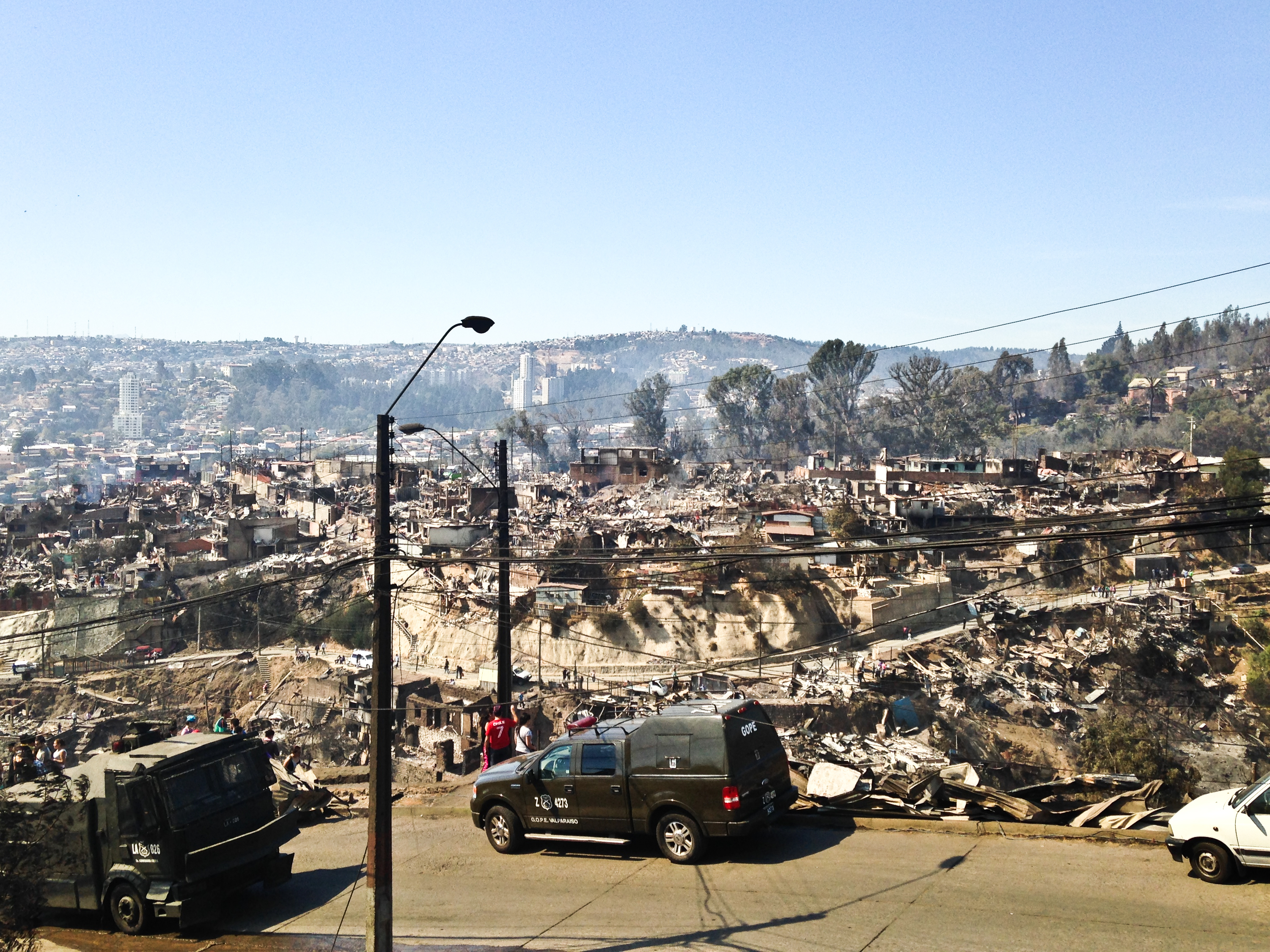
One of the affected hills of Valparaíso, on 13 April 2014

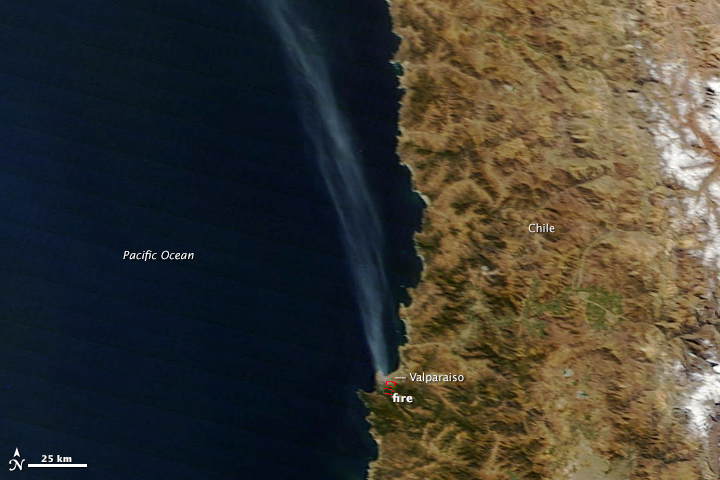
Satellite image of the fire in Valparaíso, on 13 April 2014

The fire at Camino La Pólvora was worsened by another fire at Fundo Las Cenizas, which forced the authorities to request interregional support of firefighters. With strong winds and difficult access, the process of extinguishing the fire has proven challenging.

The Chilean Red Cross chapter started the "Todos con Valparaíso y su gente" (Everyone with Valparaíso and its people) campaign, to help victims of the wildfire. Other NGOs and institutions have also collaborated in relief efforts. Esval (the local water supply company) announced an outage of supply on 13 April at Achupallas, Reñaca Alto, Santa Julia, Villa Dulce Ampliación, Curauma, and Placilla de Peñuelas.

The wildfire re-activated in areas of Cerro Ramaditas, Rocuant, and Cuesta Colorada on 13 April, between 20:45 and 21:15 local time; the outbreaks of fire left 100 additional destroyed houses. Two fire engines collided as they were reaching the area, leaving two injured firefighters.

On 14 April (two days after the wildfire started), about twenty-one aircraft worked on the fire extinguishment. Local firefighters reported an outbreak of fire at Ramaditas and Mariposa hills; while the ONEMI reported on 14 April afternoon there was an active fire in Fundo Los Perales. The office also announced three (out of thirteen) people killed by the wildfire were identified. The government announced the grant of 500 million Chilean pesos (approx. one million US dollars) to the commune of Valparaíso, because of the emergency.

== International reaction ==
Because the aircraft used by the Chilean government to combat the fire could not cover all the affected areas, international help was requested. Subsequently, the Argentine government announced they were sending Chile a White Helmet task force, firefighting planes and work teams. Foreign Minister Héctor Timerman gave his Chilean counterpart, Heraldo Muñoz, the "Argentine condolences and solidarity with the Chilean people." Colombia, through its Ministry of Foreign Affairs, expressed its solidarity with the Chilean people as well as with the Chilean Government. In the same press release, Colombia gave its condolences to the families of the victims and offered support in order to "aid the sister nation of Chile to overcome the devastating effects of this terrible disaster". Colombia's consular team in Chile has also kept in touch with the Chilean authorities in order to bring prompt assistance to its nationals that might have been affected by the wildfire.

The Spanish Prime Minister, Mariano Rajoy, expressed his grief for the loss of life, and gave his condolences to the victims' families; he also emphasized on the good relations between both countries, and said that "Their pain is ours. We, the Spanish people feel specially close to Chileans. With my feelings of greater consideration and esteem." Similarly, Mexican President Enrique Peña Nieto expressed his grief and offered "solidarity and support" to the Chilean people. The government of Panama expressed their "sadness" for the wildfire, and gave blankets for the victims.

Pope Francis sent greetings and his "feelings of solidarity" for the victims of the wildfire.

== See also ==
- List of town and city fires
