= Polanco Lift =

Polanco Lift/Elevator
- Ascensor Polanco
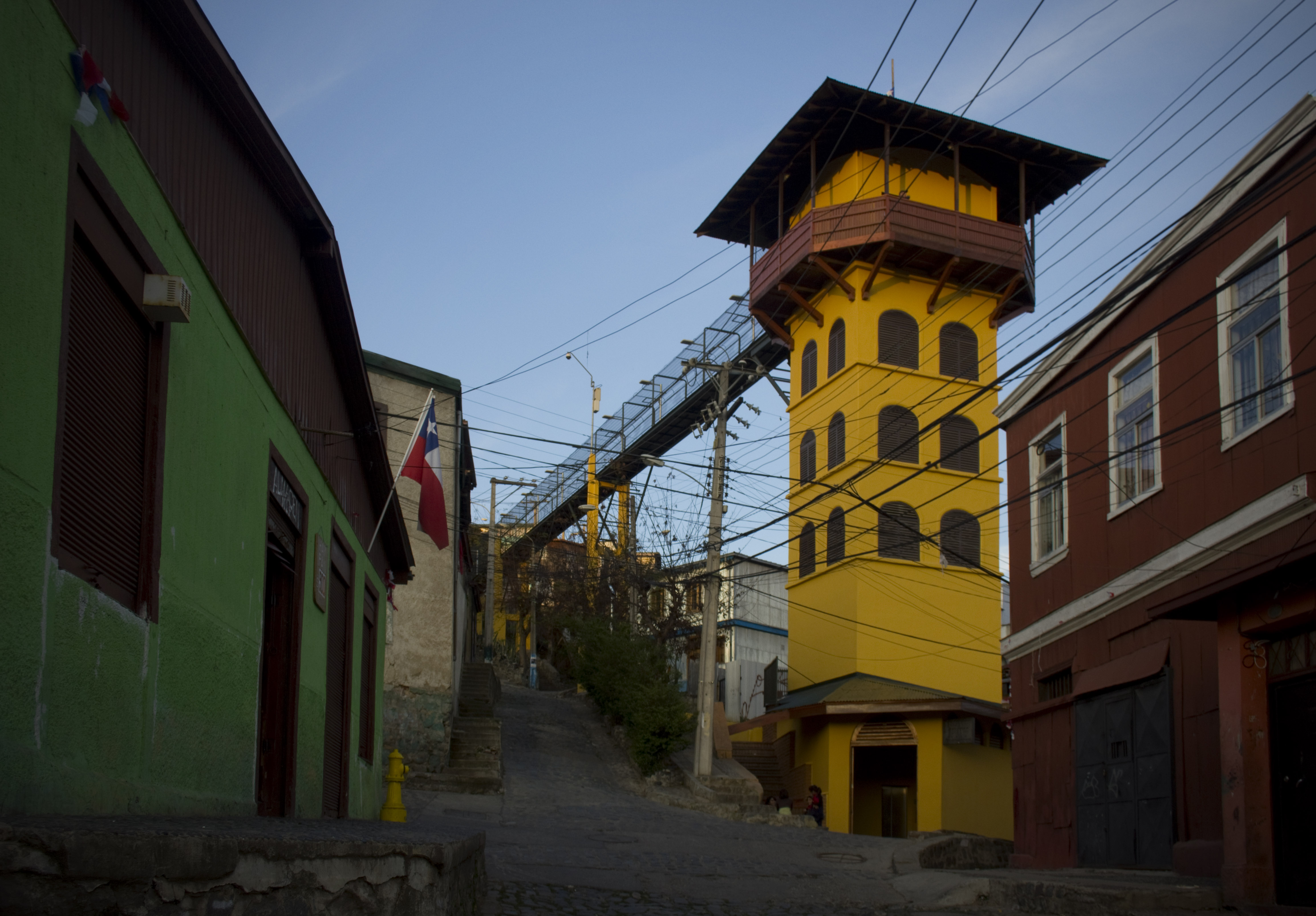
- An image of the Polanco Lift tower
- Interactive map of the Polanco Lift/Elevator area

General information
- Type: Lift
- Location: Polanco hill, Valparaíso, Chile
- Coordinates: 33.0506°S 71.5991°W
- Opening: c. 1913

Technical details
- Material: Iron

Design and construction
- Architect: Federico Page

The Polanco Lift is a passenger elevator located in Valparaíso, Chile. It consists of three stations and connects Simpson Street with Polanco Hill. This lift is the only "true" elevator in the city, as all others are technically funiculars. Today it is more visited by tourists than by the local residents.

== History ==
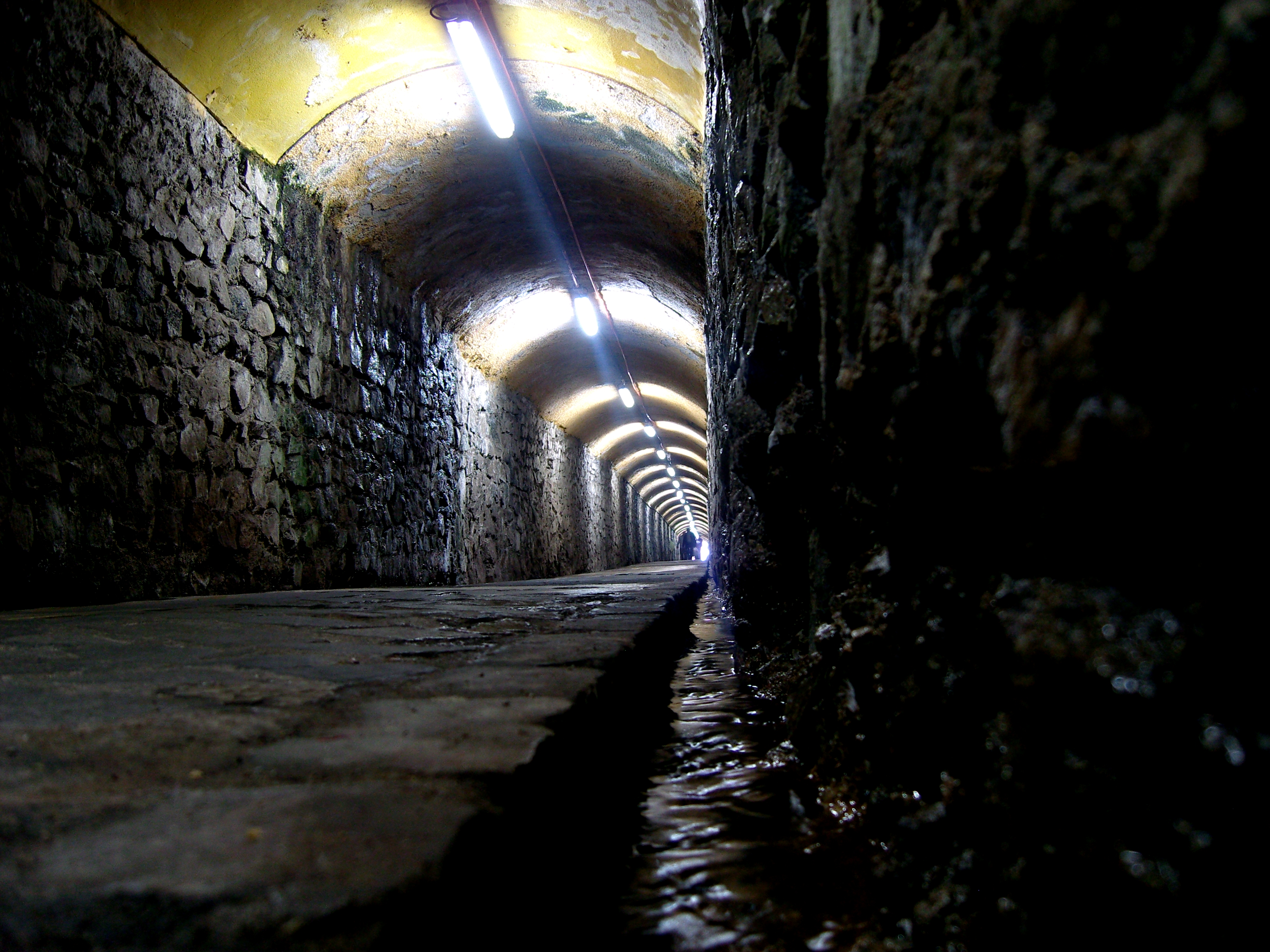
Entrance tunnel

Construction began in 1913 and concluded in 1915. Inaugurated in 1916, the lift was developed by engineer Federico Page with the assistance of the Easton Lift Company. It was declared a National Monument of Chile in 1976.

In April 2026, the tender to restore the elevator and return it to operation —after two years of being out of service— was approved.

== Location ==
The lift is located on Polanco Hill. The lower entrance is on Simpson Street. The first station is accessible through a 150-meter (492 ft) tunnel. The lift then ascends to an intermediate station and continues its ascent to the final station at the top of the tower (approximately 60 meters or 197 feet), overlooking the entire city. A bridge connects the top of the tower to nearby streets.

External images
- Polanco elevator on Google Street View
- View from afar
- Bridge to the upper station
- Entrance at the upper station
- The middle station
- Tunnel to the lower station

== See also ==
- Funicular railways of Valparaíso
- Katarina Elevator
- Santa Justa Lift
