= El Peral funicular =

Fenicular railway in Chile

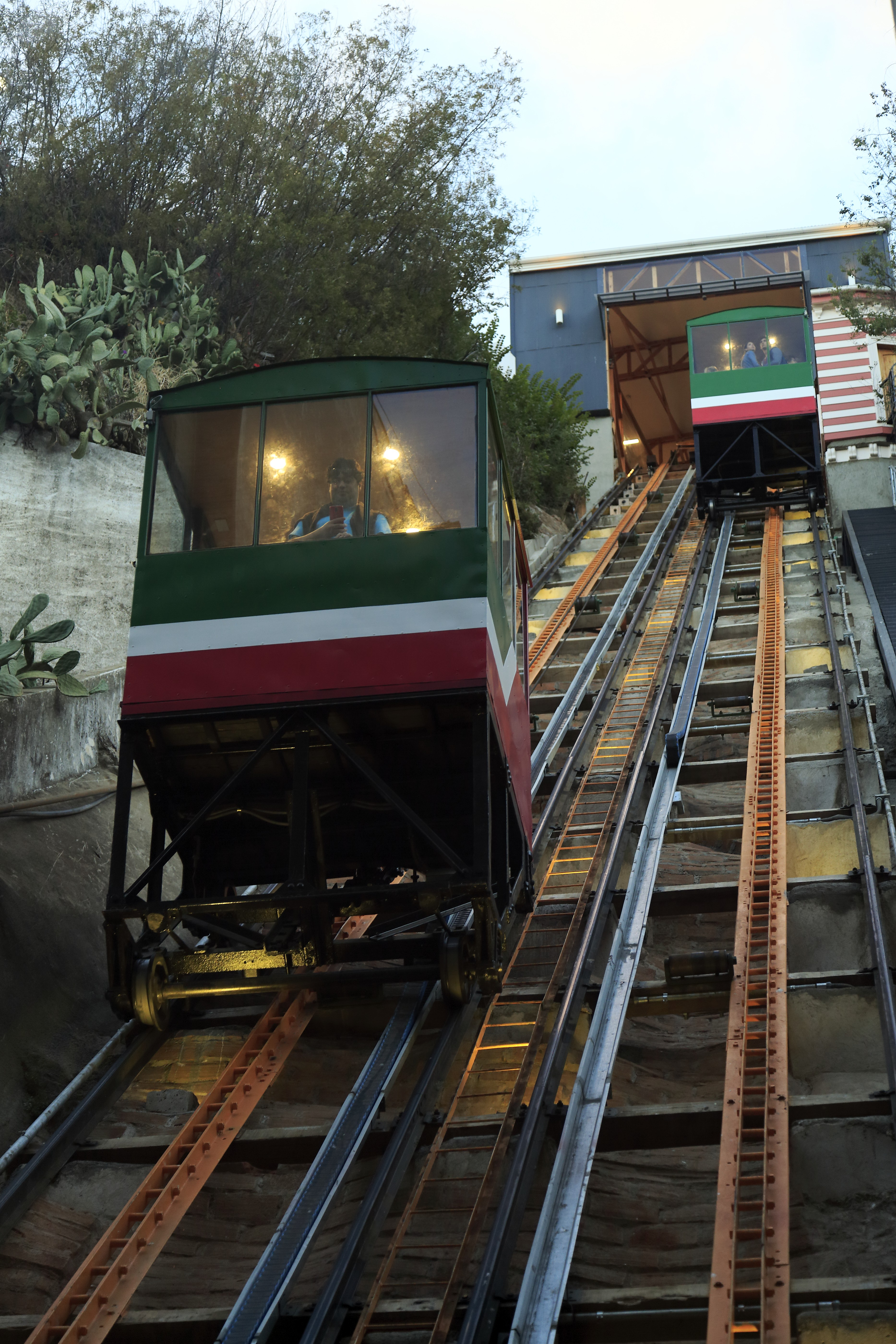

Overview
- Native name: Ascensor El Peral
- Status: in use
- Locale: Valparaíso, Chile
- Stations: 2

Service
- Type: Funicular

History
- Opened: 1902

Technical
- Track length: 0.055 km (0.034 mi)
- Highest elevation: 39 m (128 ft)

The El Peral funicular (Spanish: Ascensor El Peral) is located between two urban centers of Valparaíso, Chile, Plaza de la Justicia (Justice Square), a quiet place in Valparaiso’s downtown and Paseo Yugoslavo (Yugoslav Walk) that offers a sightseeing balcony with a vista of the bay and mountains.

Access turnstiles are in an alley inside a building, Augusto Geiger’s work. The upper station reaches Paseo Yugoslavo. Here is a view of the city and the Museo Municipal de Bellas Artes de Valparaíso (Fine Arts Museum). The top station allows visitors to see the propulsion machinery. This funicular was the first that used steam traction equipment, and its chimney became the main feature. When first opened, El Peral was the most advanced funicular due to its structural aspect and for the surrounding complementary buildings.

== See also ==
- Funicular railways of Valparaíso
