= Reina Victoria lift =

Funicular railway in Chile

Overview
- Native name: Ascensor Reina Victoria
- Status: In operation
- Locale: Valparaíso, Chile

Service
- Type: Funicular
- Services: 1

Reina Victoria lift
- Ascensor Reina Victoria
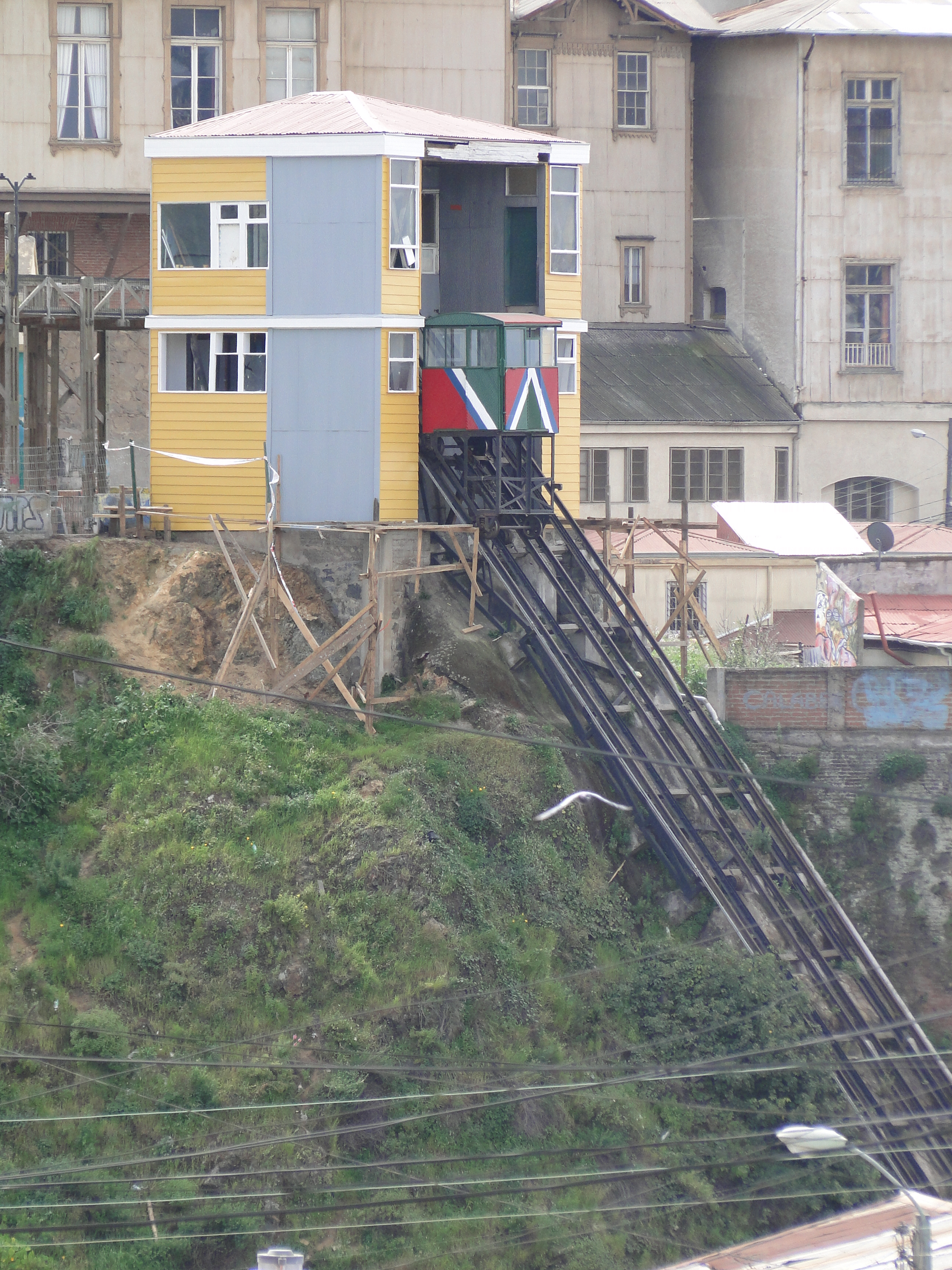
- Interactive map of Reina Victoria lift
- Location: Valparaíso, Chile

The Reina Victoria lift (ascensor Reina Victoria) is a funicular located in Valparaíso, Chile.

The funicular is owned by the municipality and stretches from Elias Street to Paseo Dimalow. It was built 1902 and opened 1903.

The lower station is located next to Aníbal Pinto Square. The Elias stairs to Cerro Alegre are located next to the station.

The upper station leads to a square which connects to Paseo Dimalow through a bridge from the early 19th century. The station was restored, and an arrival square including a playground for children, seats, and street lights were built. Cerro Panteón and Cerro Cárcel, along with some of the "Barrio de San Juan de Dios", can be seen from here. Capilla Street is next to the alley, connecting Reyes alley and Caracoles alley.

== See also ==
- Funicular railways of Valparaíso
