= Hills of Valparaíso =

Hills in Valparaiso, Chile

Hills of Valparaíso (Los cerros de Valparaíso) are the predominant geographical feature that rise above the main port area of Valparaíso in Chile.

In many cases, the hills have communities tied to the name of the specific hills. The sea level area below the hills with the four historical coastline is known as the 'plan' area, a term used after the 1906 earthquake for the project to rebuild the city The lower hills closer to the bay have Ascensores (Hill elevators or Funicular railways).

Some tourist promotion material claim that the city is formed from 42 hills. Some maps of the lower hills have other named hills identified making a different total.

In April 2014, the Great Fire of Valparaíso burned a large portion of the upper hills, destroying 2,800 homes, killing 16 people, and displacing a large number of people.

(Cerro) Hill name
Playa Ancha
Mesilla
Perdices
Cordillera
San Francisco
Artillería
Arrayán
Santo Domingo
Toro
Alegre
Concepción
Cárcel
La Loma
Jiménez
Panteón
San Juan de Dios
Yungay
Bellavista
Mariposas
Monjas
Florida
La Cruz
El Litre
Las Cañas
La Virgen
Pajonal
Merced
Santa Elena
Ramaditas
Barón
Larraín
Lecheros
Rodríguez
Molino
O´Higgins
Rocuant
Placeres
Polanco
Delicias
San Roque
Esperanza
Rodelillo
