= San Francisco Church (Valparaíso) =

National monument of Chile

Coordinates: 33°2′22.18″S 71°36′1.73″W

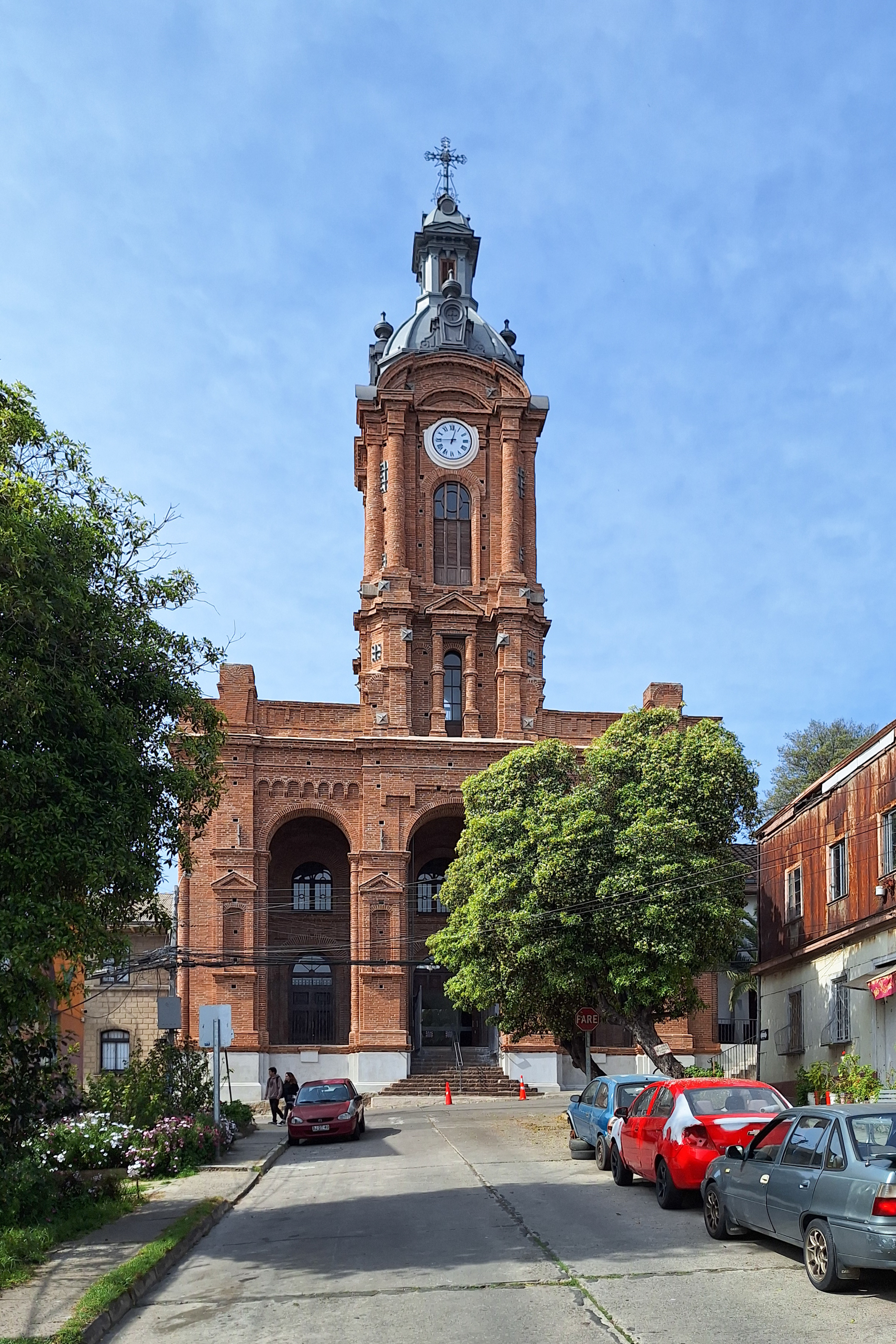
San Francisco Church in 2024.

San Francisco Church (Spanish: Iglesia de San Francisco) is a Catholic church located in Barón Hill, Valparaíso, Chile. The church served as lighthouse to the navigants who were arriving Valparaíso until the early 20th century, being the first recognizable point of the city. Valparaíso is often nicknamed with the diminutive form of Francisco: Pancho.

The church was constructed by the Franciscan community. The construction works ended in 1846. The building was remodeled in 1890 by architect Eduardo Provasoli.

The church was named National Monument of Chile on 19 July 1983. In the middle of a reconstruction process after the 2010 Chile earthquake, the church was severely damaged by a fire in September 2010. It was once again affected by a fire in August 2013 close to its re-inauguration by President Sebastián Piñera. It was reopened following an extensive restoration process in May 2024.

== Fires ==
=== 1983 ===
San Francisco Church suffered a fire on 4 February 1983. It was reconstructed in the following years.

=== 2010 ===
San Francisco Church suffered a great fire on 2 September 2010, in the middle of a reconstruction process which had started in June 2010. The fire was started in the attic of the church, and damaged most of the roofing of the church. It also damaged Luis Beltrán School. The church had been already severely damaged by 27 February 2010 Chile earthquake.

The fire started around 12:00 local time (16:00 UTC), while a priest was performing a mass for around 60 people. The church was immediately evacuated. Around 600 students from the nearby Luis Beltrán School were also evacuated.

The church was scheduled to be re-inaugurated on 15 September, according to priest Javier McMahon. It is believed that the cause of the fire were some welding sparks.

The Ministry of Public Works of Chile estimated the damage at around 2.5 billion Chilean pesos (5 million US dollars).

=== 2013 ===
The church was, once again, affected by a fire on 2 August 2013. The fire started at 04:30 local time (08:30 UTC) for reasons under investigation, in the Faculty of Mathematics of the Pontifical Catholic University of Valparaíso. Firefighters told La Tercera the building had no risk of collapsing. The church was being repaired at the time, and was close to being inaugurated by President Piñera.

=== Restoration ===
In May 2024, the church was reopened following an extensive restoration process.
