= Avenida España (Valparaíso) =

Road in Chile

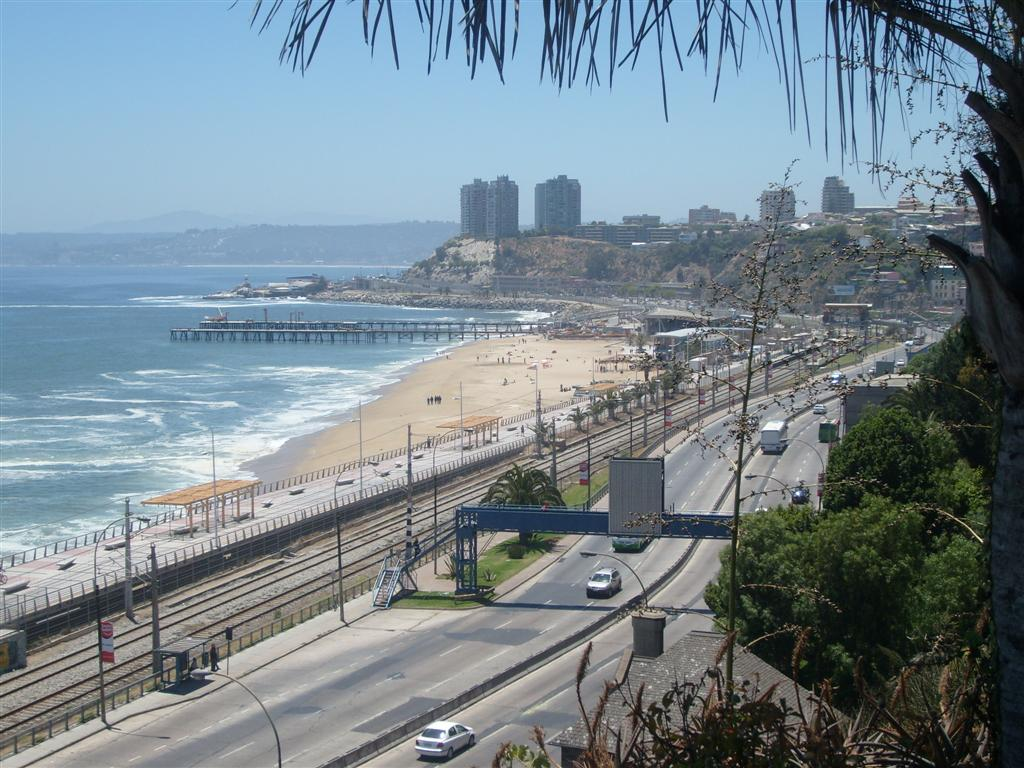
Avenida España

Avenida España is a 10 km (6.2 mi) long major arterial coastal road from the city of Valparaíso north along the coast to Viña del Mar in Valparaíso Region, Chile. The road was originally improved with an international loan in 1922.
