= Plan de Valparaíso =

Coordinates: 33°2′35.56″S 71°37′22.25″W

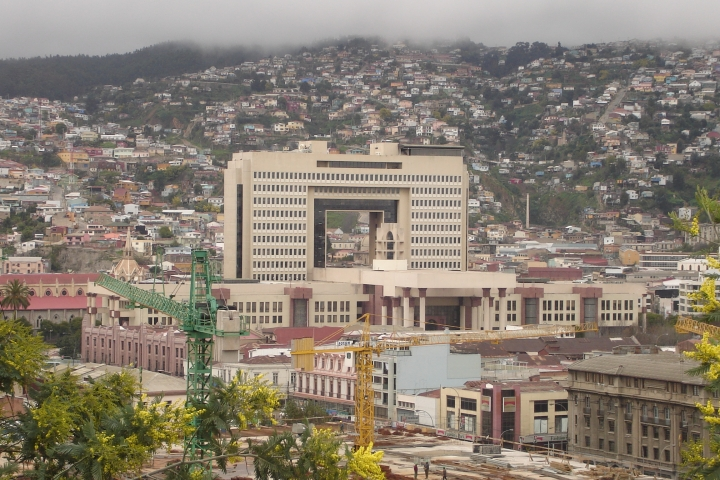
View of the National Congress of Chile located in the Plano.

The Plano de Valparaíso is the name given to the flat region of Valparaíso, Chile, where public and commercial buildings are found, distinguishing it from the hills (cerros) where the majority of the population of Valparaíso live.

Traditionally, the plano is divided into the sectors of Barrio Puerto, originally the nucleus of the city, and El Almendral, a preferentially dedicated trade zone.
