= Universidad de Chile metro station =

Santiago metro station

Universidad de Chile
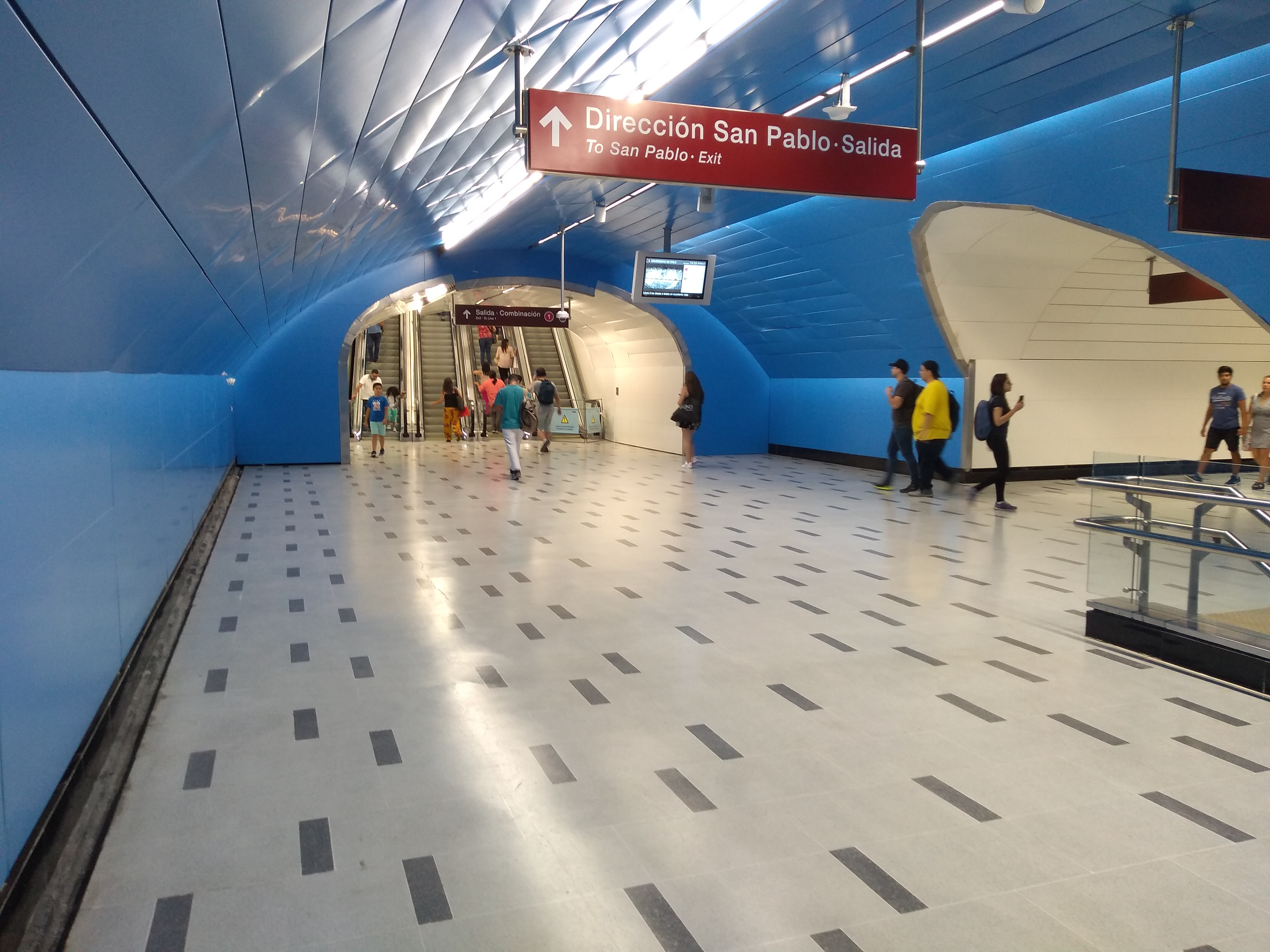
- Level of combination between lines 1 and 3.

General information
- Location: Avenida Libertador General Bernardo O'Higgins / Paseo Ahumada
- Coordinates: 33°26′37.50″S 70°39′1.24″W
- System: Santiago rapid transit
- Owner: Metro S.A.
- Lines: Line 1 Line 3
- Platforms: 2 side platforms
- Tracks: 2
- Connections: Transantiago buses

Construction
- Structure type: Underground
- Platform levels: 3
- Accessible: yes

History
- Opened: 31 March 1977; 22 January 2019
- Electrified: Central rail

Passengers
- 60000 a day

Services
Preceding station	Santiago Metro	Following station
La Moneda towards San Pablo	Line 1	Santa Lucía towards Los Dominicos
Plaza de Armas towards Plaza Quilicura	Line 3	Parque Almagro towards Fernando Castillo Velasco
Location

Universidad de Chile (in Spanish: University of Chile) station is a transfer station between the Line 1 and Line 3 of the Santiago Metro. It is an underground station located between La Moneda and Santa Lucía stations on the same line. It is located at the junction of Avenida Libertador General Bernardo O'Higgins, also known as "Alameda", and Paseo Ahumada in the commune of Santiago. The Line 1 station was opened on 31 March 1977 as part of the extension of the line from La Moneda to Salvador. The Line 3 station was opened on 22 January 2019 as part of the inaugural section of the line, from Los Libertadores to Fernando Castillo Velasco.

== Vicinity ==
The station is named after the Universidad de Chile (University of Chile), whose oldest campus is located in the immediate vicinity. Other landmarks near the station include the Paseo Ahumada, a four-block pedestrian shopping street; the Instituto Nacional General José Miguel Carrera, or simply "Instituto Nacional", Chile's oldest and most prestigious school; Barrio París-Londres, San Francisco Church, the Santiago Stock Exchange, La Moneda Palace and the main headquarters of some of Chile's oldest banks.

== Connections ==
There are seven Transantiago bus stops in the streets above the station, and it is also developed into a transfer station for the Metro Line 3, which was completed by January 22, 2019.

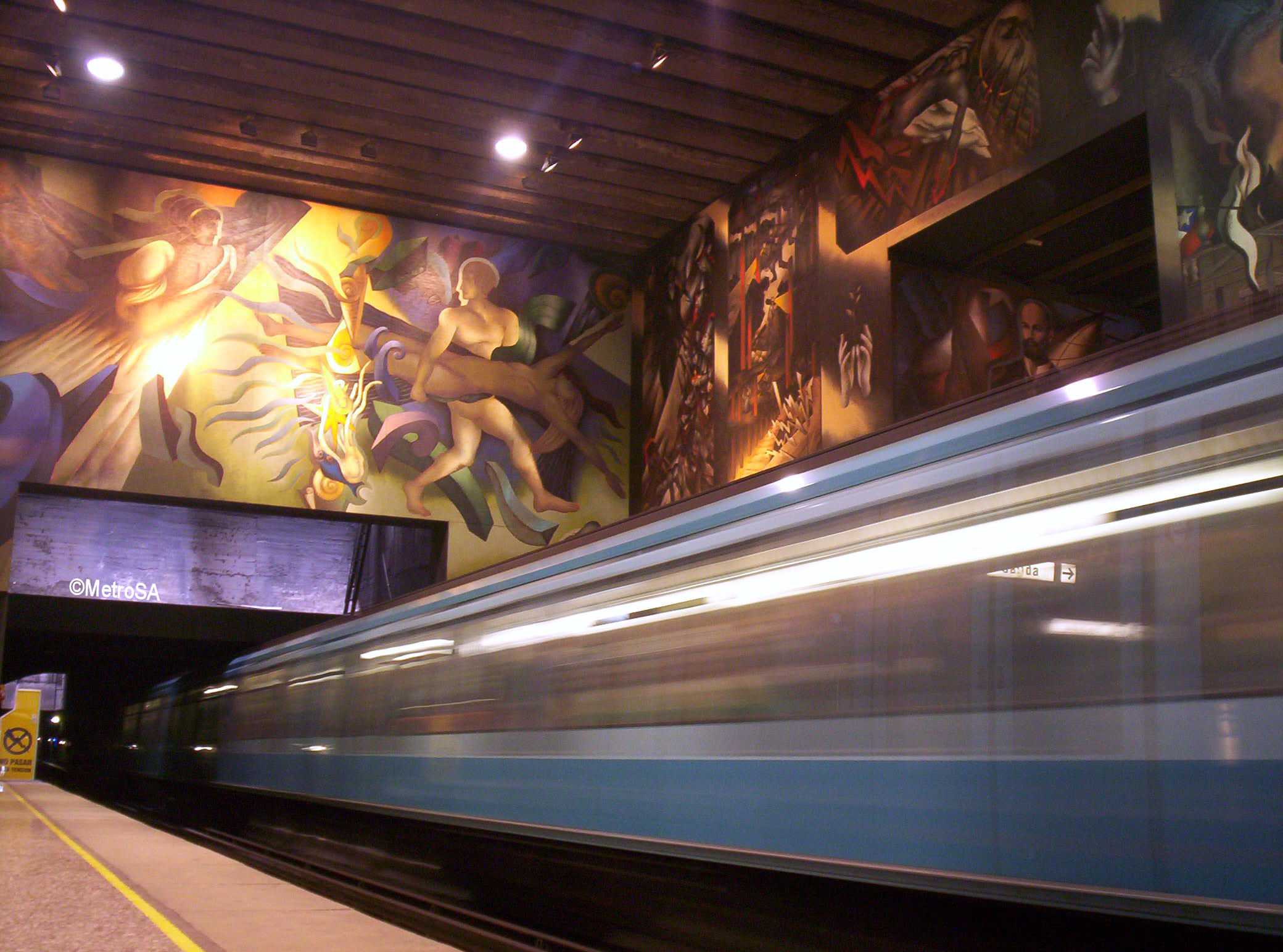
The Mural from the platform

== Mural Memoria Visual de una Nación ==
Universidad de Chile Station features a 1200 square meter mural called "Memoria Visual de una Nación" (Visual Memory of a Nation), painted by Mario Toral, a Chilean painter and photographer. The mural is located in the platform area and its divided into two parts: "Pasado" (“Past”), finished in 1996, and "Present" (“Present”) finished in 1999. It shows fragments of Chile's history, from the violent Spanish conquest to the modern day.

In 2011, Lonely Planet named Universidad de Chile one of its "Subway stations worth getting off the train for", and in 2014, the BBC named it one of the seven most beautiful stations in the world.
