= Casa Central de la Universidad de Chile =

Main building of the University of Chile

Coordinates: 33.4445°S 70.6510°W

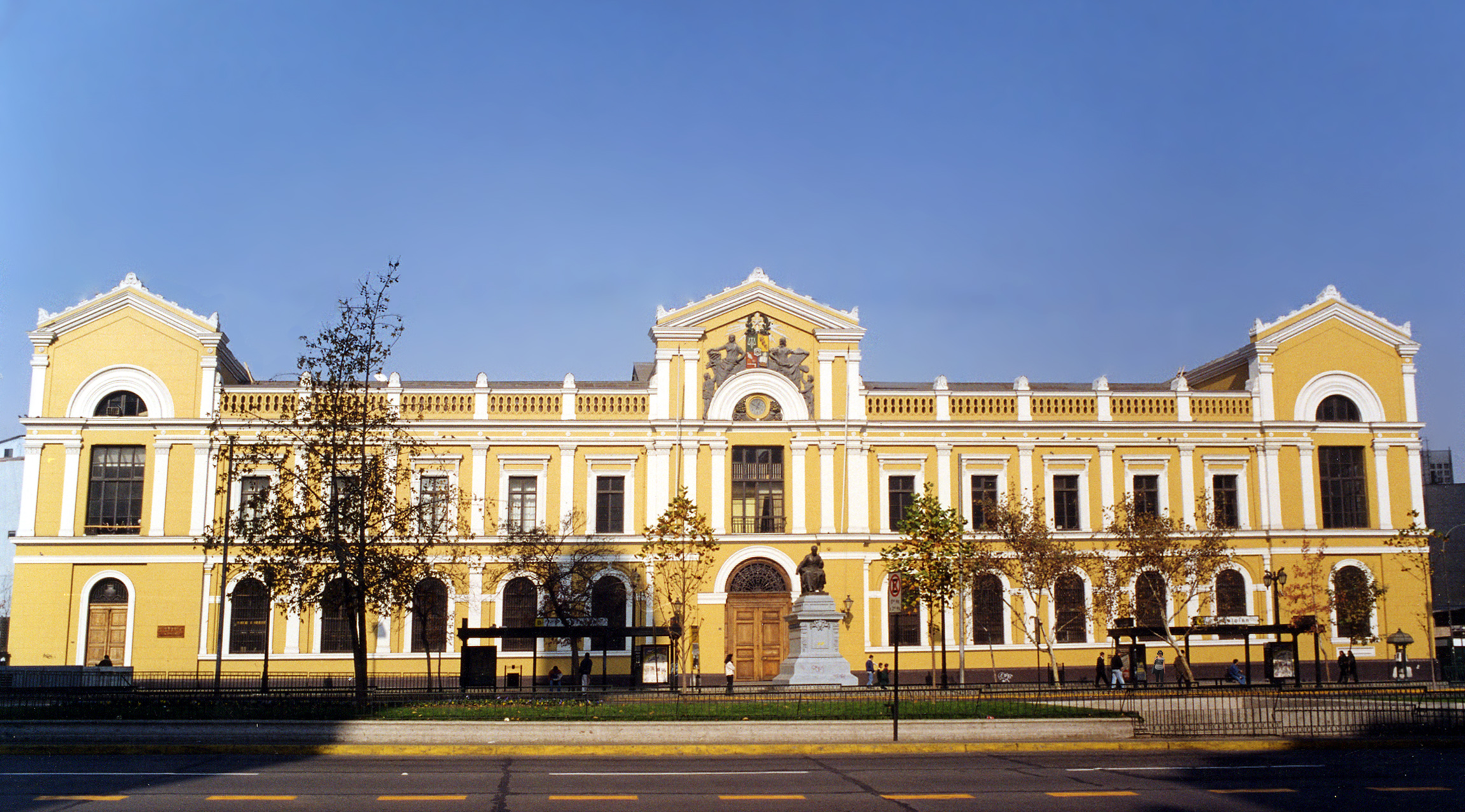
- Interactive map of the Casa Central de la Universidad de Chile area

General information
- Location: Santiago, Chile

Design and construction
- Architects: Lucien Hénault (1857–1863); Fermín Vivaceta (1863–1872)

The Casa Central de la Universidad de Chile, also known as Palacio de la Universidad de Chile, is the main building for the Universidad de Chile, and is located at 1058 Alameda Libertador Bernardo O'Higgins, in Santiago, Chile. The building dates from 1872, and currently houses the rectorate, rooms used for ceremonial events and the university's Andrés Bello Archives. It was declared a National Monument of Chile in 1974.

== History ==
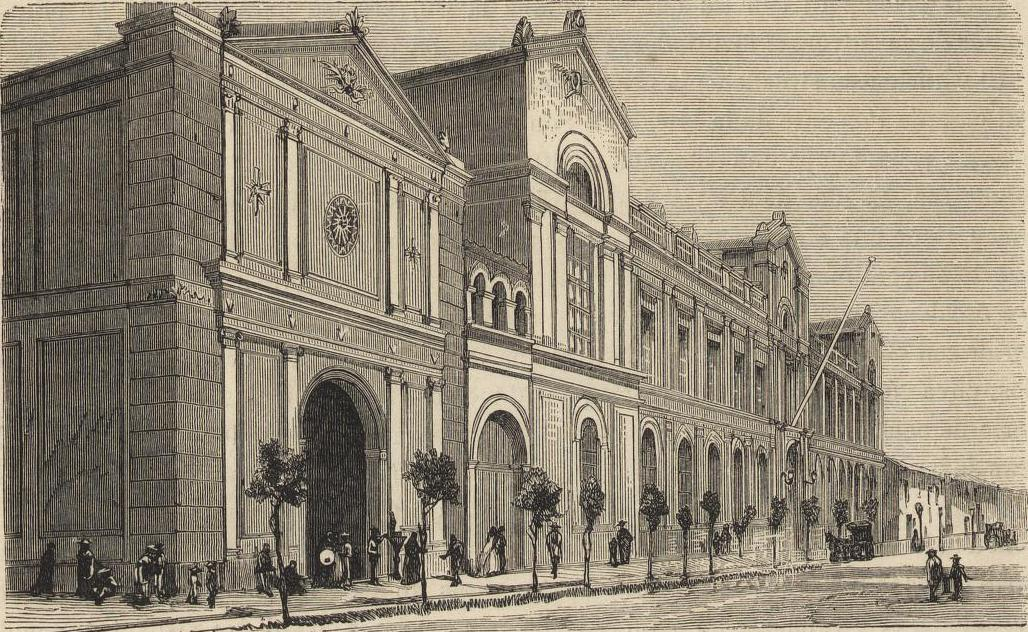
Casa Central in 1872.

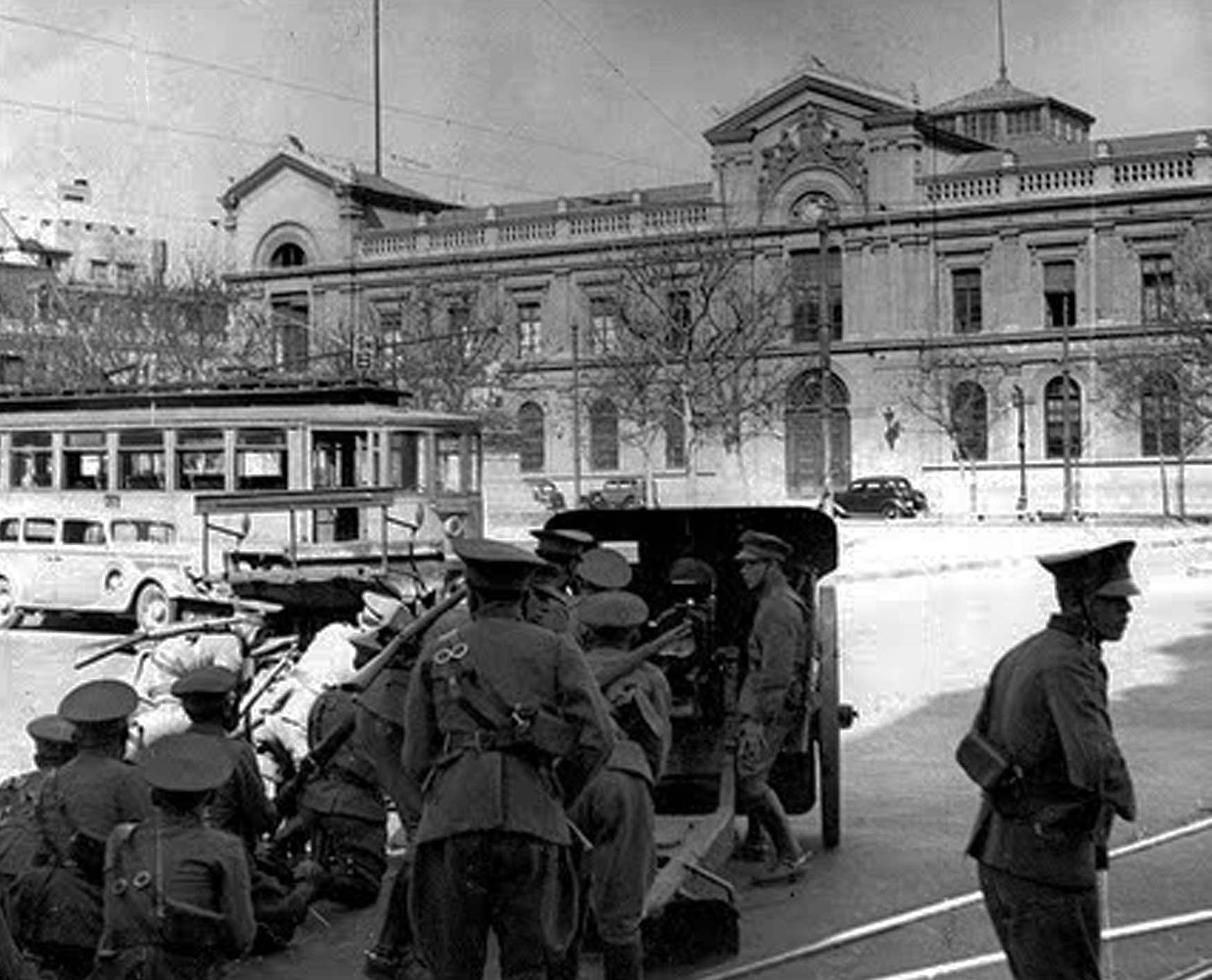
Soldiers facing the Casa Central de la Universidad in 1938.

After its inauguration in 1843, the Universidad de Chile was in need of housing. The then Minister of Justice, Manuel Montt, selected a site to build the Palacio de la Universidad, which was adjacent to the since-demolished San Diego Church on the Alameda de Las Delicias.

The university originally occupied an annex of the Instituto Nacional, which was designed by architect Juan Herbage. Subsequently, it was decided that the university would have its own building with a main entrance facing the Alameda. The building was designed by Lucien Hénault.

The building was built between 1863 and 1872 by Fermín Vivaceta, who was one of the first architects born and educated in Chile. It is considered to be the first multi-story building built on the Alameda as well as the third construction to be funded by government money in the country.

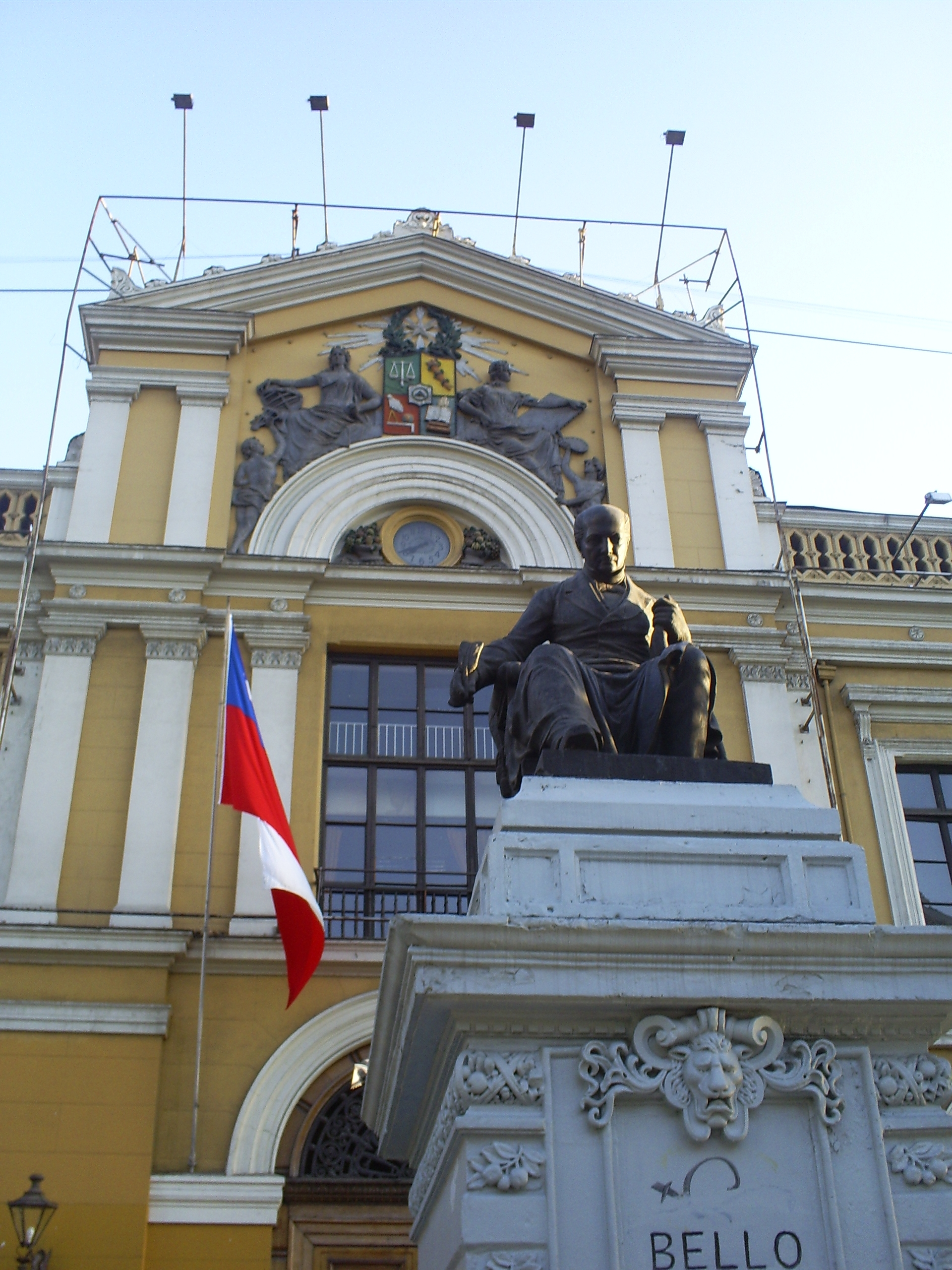
A statue of Andrés Bello in front of the Casa Central de la Universidad de Chile

In 1912, the Faculty of Law and Political Science (now just the Faculty of Law) needed more room. To meet this need, it was proposed to add a third floor to the building, but the project was withdrawn, and it was decided in 1927 to accommodate the University of Chile Law School in the east wing of the Casa Central. In 1938, it was relocated to its current location on Pio Nono street.

In 1928, the building housing the library of the university was demolished by order of the then provisional Minister of Education, Pablo Ramírez. The library (today the Central Archives Andrés Bello) was reorganized in 1936 by the then Rector Juvenal Hernández, funded through donations by various professors, including Amanda Labarca and Pablo Neruda.

On September 5, 1938, the Casa Central was seized by members of the National Socialist Movement of Chile, with the rector Juvenal Hernández Jaque being held hostage. President Arturo Alessandri gave the order, and two rounds of artillery were fired against the main entrance of the building, killing four people. This event formed part of the massacre known as "Matanza del Seguro Obrero".

A clock by the firm Clemens Riefler of Munich was installed on the facade in 1929.

The building was declared a Historic Monument in 1974.

On March 31, 1977 the adjacent Universidad de Chile metro station was opened, named after the building.

On March 27, 2001 a new mural by Mario Toral was installed in the Salón de Honor.

The building underwent structural damage after the 1985 Algarrobo earthquake, which was aggravated by the 2010 Chile earthquake. The Casa Central was initially closed for a year, leaving open only the rector office, while the rest of the employees were relocated to the Torre 15 de San Borja.

The renovations were completed in April 2015 for the cost of approximately $1,700 millions, which included the refurbishment of rooms to house the Senado Universitario, and exhibitions on the first floor.

== Description ==
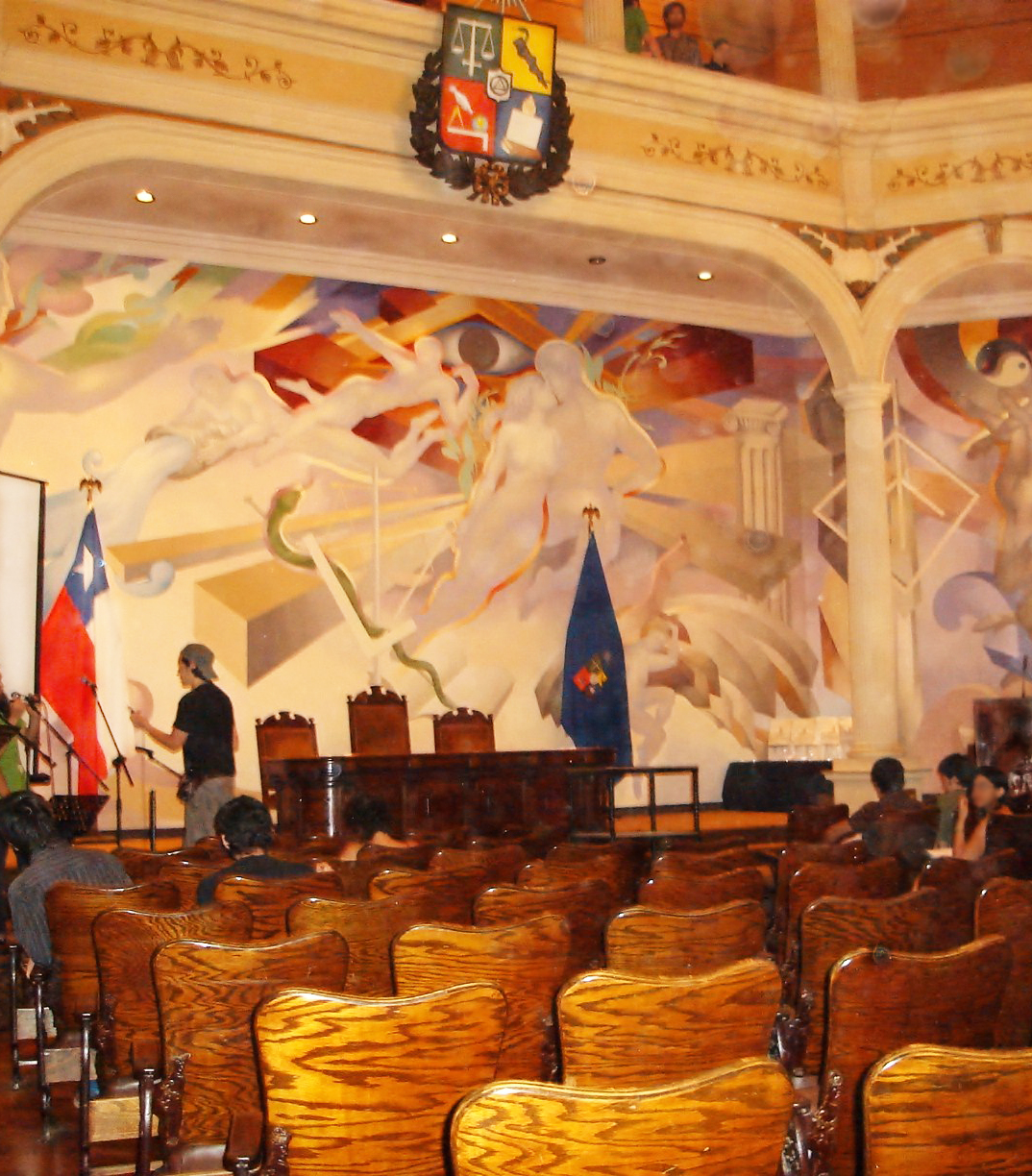
Salón de Honor.

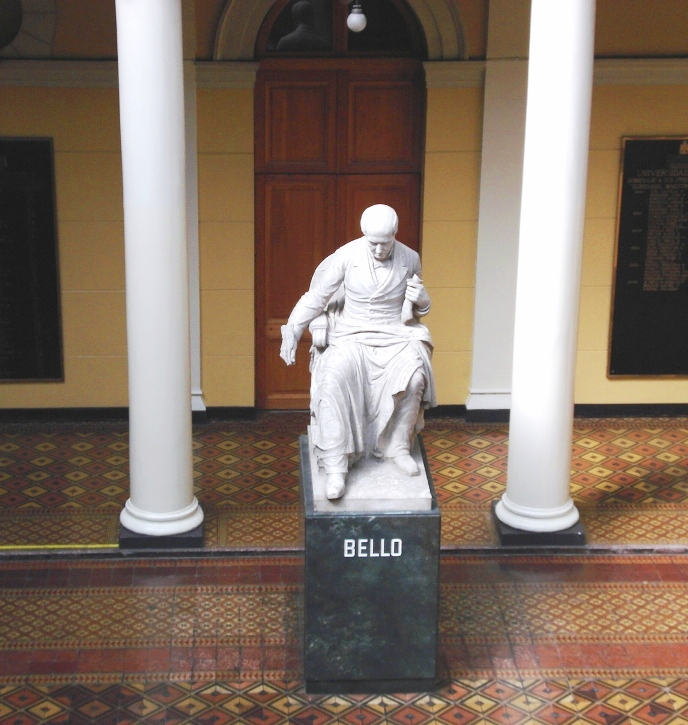
Statue of Andrés Bello on the namesake Patio.

Built in the Neo-classical style, the Casa Central de la Universidad de Chile is an architecturally simple building, which is attested by its scarce decoration and the prevalence of straight lines.

Two stairs from the vestibule lead to the second floor. At the center of the building is the Salón de Honor, a three-level auditorium whose Doric columns support the galleries. The palace features two patios located to the east and to the west of the Salón de Honor, respectively named "Ignacio Domeyko" and "Andrés Bello", each containing a statue of the man for which the corresponding patio is named.

An iconic room of the Palacio was the Salón de Honor, which originally contained a large canvas painting by Ernesto Courtois Bonnencontre named La Alegoría de las Ciencias, las Artes y las Letras. It was destroyed during the student protests in the late 1920s.

=== Statue of Andrés Bello ===
The Carrara marble statue was created in 1881 by Nicanor Plaza to celebrate the 100th anniversary of the birth of Andrés Bello, which was proposed by José Victorino Lastarria.

The statue was originally installed at the National Congress Building's main entrance facing Catedral Street in Santiago. In 1884 was relocated in front of the Palacio del Real Tribunal del Consulado de Santiago and then moved again in 1931 to the median strip of the Alameda, before being relocated to the western patio of the Casa Central in 1974, which was officially named as "Patio Andrés Bello".

In front of the Casa Central, on the south sidewalk of the Alameda Bernardo O'Higgins, there is a replica by Samuel Román of that statue.

== Rooms ==
- Rectoría
- Consejo Universitario
- Prorrectoría
- Archivo Central "Andrés Bello"
- Archivo y Laboratorio Fotográfico
- Administración Casa Central
- Librería Universitaria
- Salón de Honor
- Sala "Ignacio Domeyko"
- Sala "Enrique Sazié"
- Sala "Eloísa Díaz"
- Sala Museo "Gabriela Mistral"
- Patio "Andrés Bello"
- Patio "Domeyko"
- Colección de Caracolas de Pablo Neruda
