= Aracy Amaral =

Brazilian art historian and curator (1930–2026)

Director of the Pinacoteca do Estado de São Paulo
- In office 1975–1979

Director of the Museum of Contemporary Art, University of São Paulo
- In office 1982–1986

Personal details
- Born: 22 February 1930 São Paulo, São Paulo, Brazil
- Died: 14 September 2026 (aged 96) São Paulo, São Paulo, Brazil
- Spouse: Mario Toral
- Children: 1
- Relatives: Antônio Henrique Amaral (brother); Tarsila do Amaral (aunt)
- Education: Pontifical Catholic University of São Paulo; University of São Paulo
- Occupation: Art historian; curator
- Awards: Guggenheim Fellow (1977)

Academic background
- Thesis: Tarsila – sua obra e seu tempo (1976)

Academic work
- Discipline: Art history
- Sub-discipline: Modernism in Brazil; Tarsila do Amaral
- Institutions: University of São Paulo; São Paulo Research Foundation

Aracy Abreu Amaral (22 February 1930 – 14 September 2026) was a Brazilian art historian and curator. Born in São Paulo and raised in Buenos Aires, she worked as an art history professor at the University of São Paulo and director of the Pinacoteca do Estado de São Paulo (1975–1979) and Museum of Contemporary Art, University of São Paulo (1982–1986). A 1977 Guggenheim Fellow, she was an academic who specialized in modernism in Brazil, particularly Tarsila do Amaral.

== Life and career ==
=== Early life ===
Aracy Abreu Amaral was born on 22 February 1930 in São Paulo. Her mother Nadya worked as a diseuse, and her father Aguinaldo Amaral was a civil servant for the Departamento Nacional do Café. She has three siblings, including artist Antônio Henrique Amaral, and her aunt is painter Tarsila do Amaral. She spent her early childhood in Buenos Aires, moving there due to her father Aguinaldo Amaral's employment with the Instituto Brasileiro do Café. She was educated at the Pontifical Catholic University of São Paulo, where she obtained a journalism degree in 1959, and at the University of São Paulo (USP), where she received her master's degree in philosophy in 1969 and PhD in arts in 1975. Her doctoral dissertation was Tarsila – sua obra e seu tempo (1976). She also spent a year at the École du Louvre (1958–1959).

While studying at USP, Amaral started working as an assistant to the director of the university's Museum of Contemporary Art in 1964, before being promoted to editor of their publications in 1965, a position she held until 1977. She originally worked as a researcher for the São Paulo Research Foundation from 1968 until 1970, a freelancer for clients such as Wesley Duke Lee, Cildo Meireles, Hélio Oiticica, and Mira Schendel, and as a radio host for Jovem Pan in 1972.

=== Academic career ===
In 1972, Amaral started working as a professor of art history at the University of São Paulo Faculty of Architecture and Urbanism, and she was granted her livre-docência there in 1983. In 1982, she returned to their Museum of Contemporary Art as director, serving until 1986. She also served as director of the Pinacoteca do Estado de São Paulo from 1975 until 1979 and as part of the Prince Claus Fund International Prize Committee from 2002 until 2005. By 2021, she had retired from USP.

As an academic, Amaral specialized in modernism in Brazil, particularly Tarsila do Amaral. She published several books on art history, including Blaise Cendrars no Brasil e os modernistas (1970) and Tarsila: Sua obra e seu tempo (1975). In 1977, she was appointed a Guggenheim Fellow for "a study of international and national influences on the art of Brazil". In 2006, she was awarded the Moinho Santista Award (now the Fundação Bunge Award) in Museology. Writing for ARTMargins, the art historian Sofia Gotti called Amaral's works "a vital reference for the study of art history in Brazil", lamenting the lack of English-language translations for her work.

In 2005, Amaral was the general coordinator of Itaú Cultural's Rumos project. She also curated the 2009 Trienal de Chile and 2011 Bienal do Mercosul. In 2021, the São Paulo Research Foundation called her "a pioneer in the field of curatorship in Brazil". She has a son with her ex-husband Mario Toral, historian and comic artist André Toral.

=== Death ===
Amaral died on 14 September 2026, at the age of 96.
