= Sacred Hearts Church (Valparaíso) =

National monument of Chile

Coordinates: 33.0484°S 71.6155°W

- Iglesia de los Sagrados Corazones
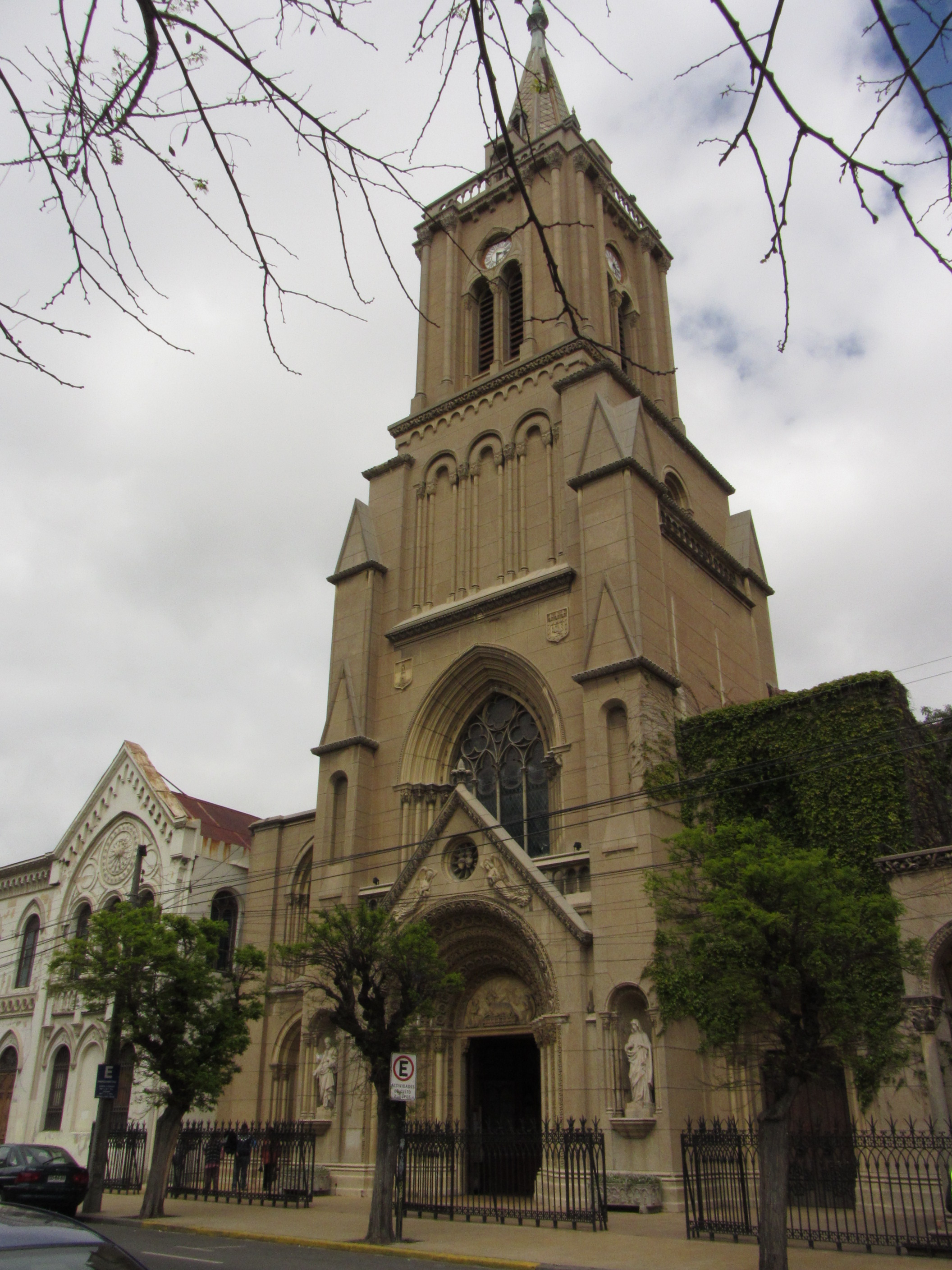

Religion
- Affiliation: Roman Catholic

Location
- Municipality: Valparaíso
- Country: Chile
- Interactive map of Sacred Hearts Church

Architecture
- Architects: Lucien Hénault; Arturo Mecking; Juan Eduardo Fehrman

The Sacred Hearts Church (Spanish: Iglesia de los Sagrados Corazones) is a Catholic church located at 2086 Independencia Street, in El Almendral neighborhood, in Valparaíso, Chile. Staffed by the Congregation of the Sacred Hearts of Jesus and Mary, it was built to serve as the church for the Sacred Hearts School of Valparaíso community. The church was declared as a National Monument of Chile in 2003, within the category of Historic Monuments.

== History ==
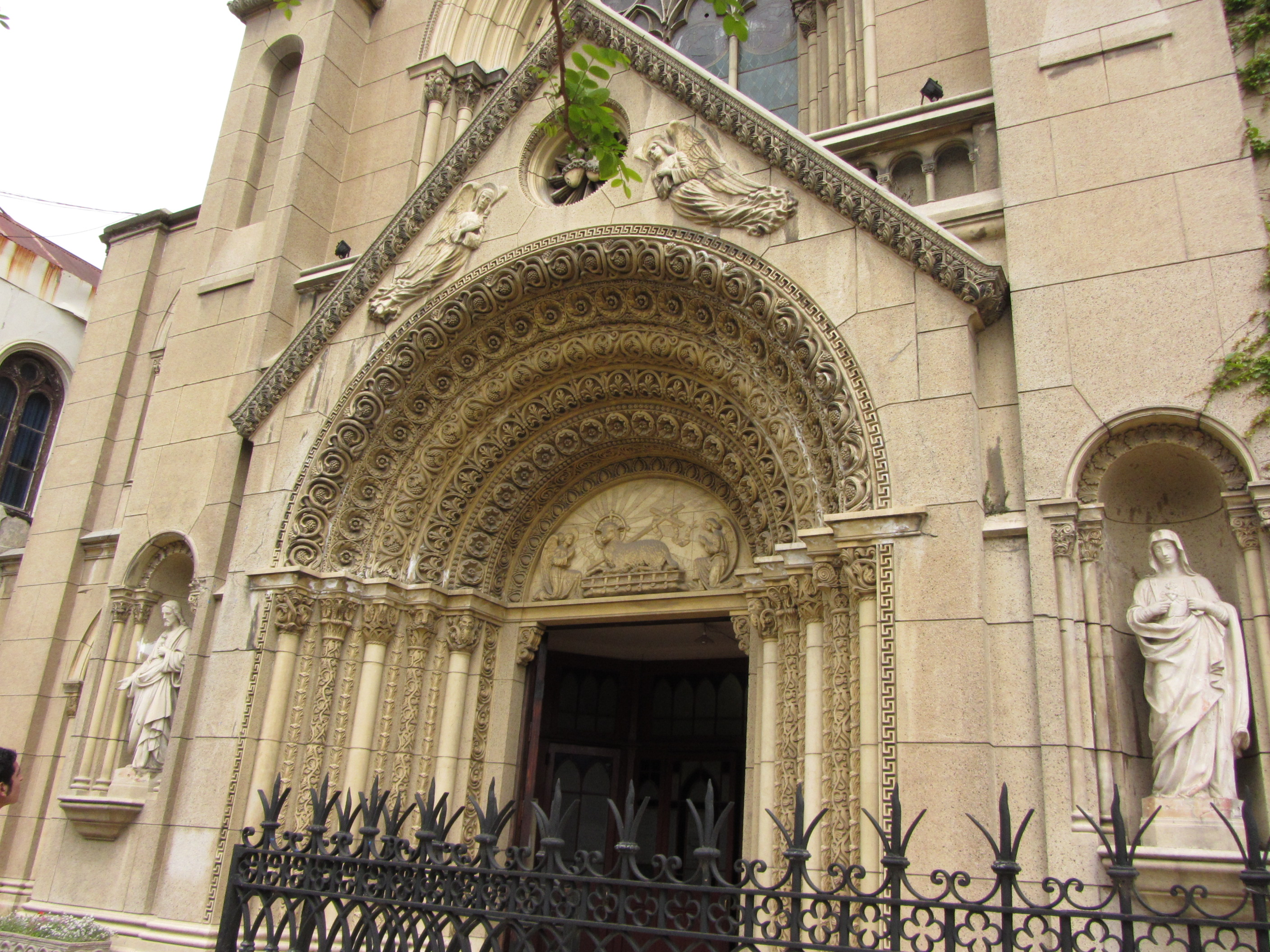
Archivolted portal

Ship Sylphide arrived in Valparaíso on 13 May 1834 from Bordeaux, France, bringing as passengers four priests of the Congregation of the Sacred Hearts of Jesus and Mary whose final destination was the Gambier Islands, in the French Polynesia. Chrysostome Liausu was the only of them who remained residing in Valparaíso. He formed the first community of the congregation in a port of South America.

In 1837 Liausu was authorized by the Cabildo of the city to create a school, thus establishing the first private school in the independent Chile, namely the Colegio de los Sagrados Corazones de Valparaíso (Sacred Hearts School of Valparaíso). In 1840, the school was moved to a site on Independencia Street, its current location, which was later enlarged by purchases of adjoining lands. A chapel was built on the site.

In late 1860, the father Oliver ordered the construction of a new church, which was designed by architects Lucien Hénault and Arturo Mecking. The foundation stone was laid on 3 May 1868. The architect Juan Eduardo Fehrman took over the final construction stage between 1870 and 1872. The church was inaugurated on 6 February 1874, despite having an unfinished tower.

The 2010 Chile earthquake badly damaged the church. As a result, it had to be repaired. The restoration work included the reparation of cracked walls, repainting of interior walls, and restoration of facades. The work lasted approximately a year at a cost of $240 million, half funded by a restoration program from the National Council of Culture and the Arts.

== Description ==
Located on Independencia Street, between Freire and Rodríguez streets, the church and the adjoining school have similar architectural styles and occupy an entire city block front. The facade is Romanesque and Gothic Revival in style, while the interior has a Gothic character.

The interior of the church includes an image named Cristo Tradicional, which was carved by an Ecuadorian artist, who was visiting his son, a member of the congregation, in Valparaíso.
