= Museo Colonial =

Coordinates: 33°26′37.42″S 70°38′52.56″W

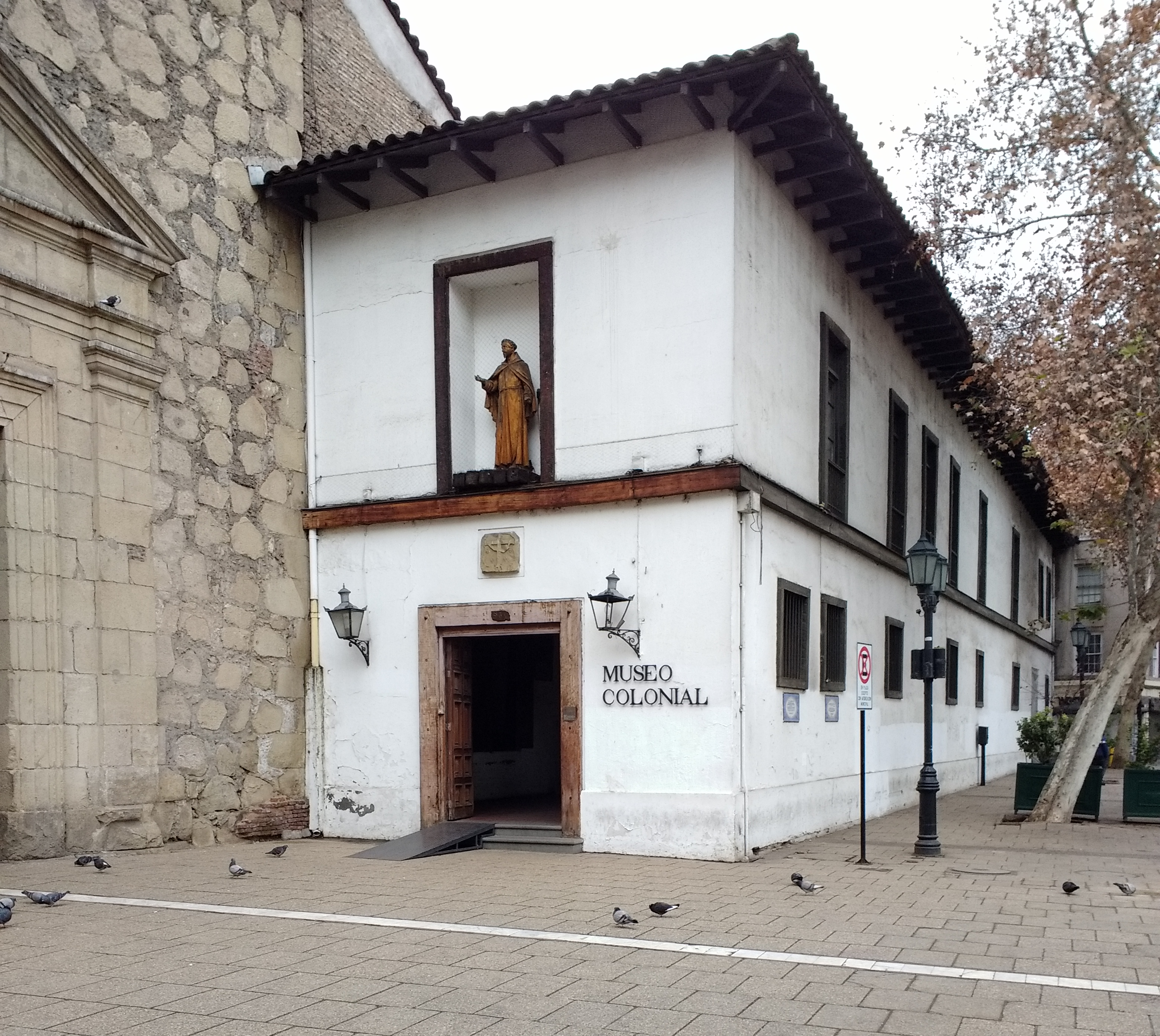
Museo Colonial

Museo Colonial (English: Colonial Museum) is a historical, cultural and religious museum located in Santiago, Chile. The museum explores the colonial period of Chile and South America, with a collection of paintings, sculpture, furniture and other objects. Many of the pieces are religious, and were created in Peru, the former colonial capital. The museum also features a genealogical tree of the Franciscan Order which is "gigantic" in size and includes 644 miniature portraits.

The museum is housed in the convent adjacent to San Francisco Church.
