= Iglesia San Agustín, Chile =

Historic colonial church in Santiago, Chile

Iglesia San Agustín Iglesia de San Agustín (in Spanish)
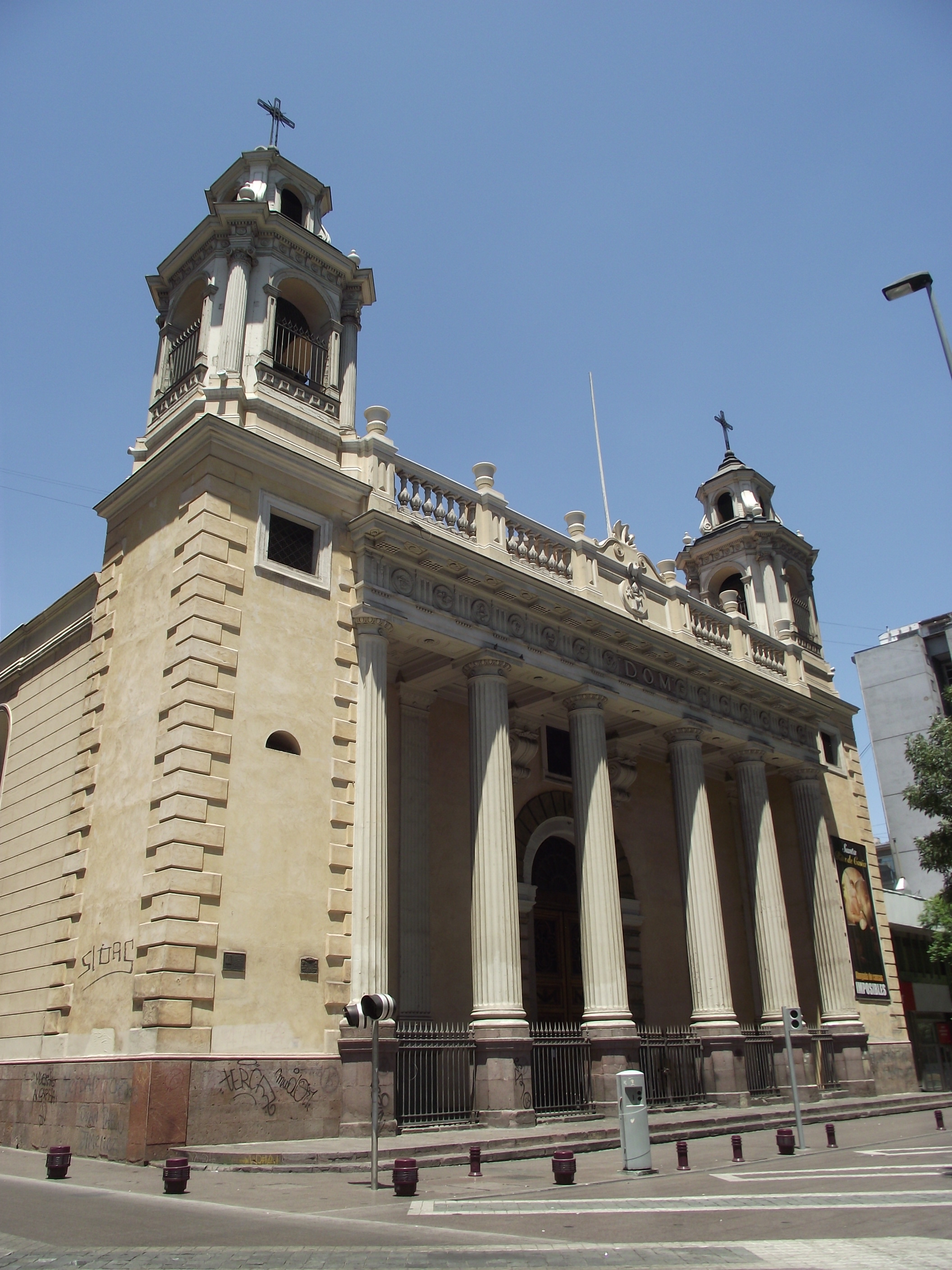
- Facade of Iglesia San Agustin

Religion
- Affiliation: Roman Catholic
- Ecclesiastical or organisational status: Church
- Year consecrated: 1625, 2004

Location
- Location: Santiago, Chile
- Interactive map of Iglesia San Agustín; Iglesia de San Agustín (in Spanish)
- Coordinates: 33°26′27″S 70°38′56″W

Architecture
- Architects: First Construction: Unknown Reconstruction: Julio Lepe Facade: Fermín Vicaceta
- Style: Spanish Baroque & Neoclassical
- Completed: 1625

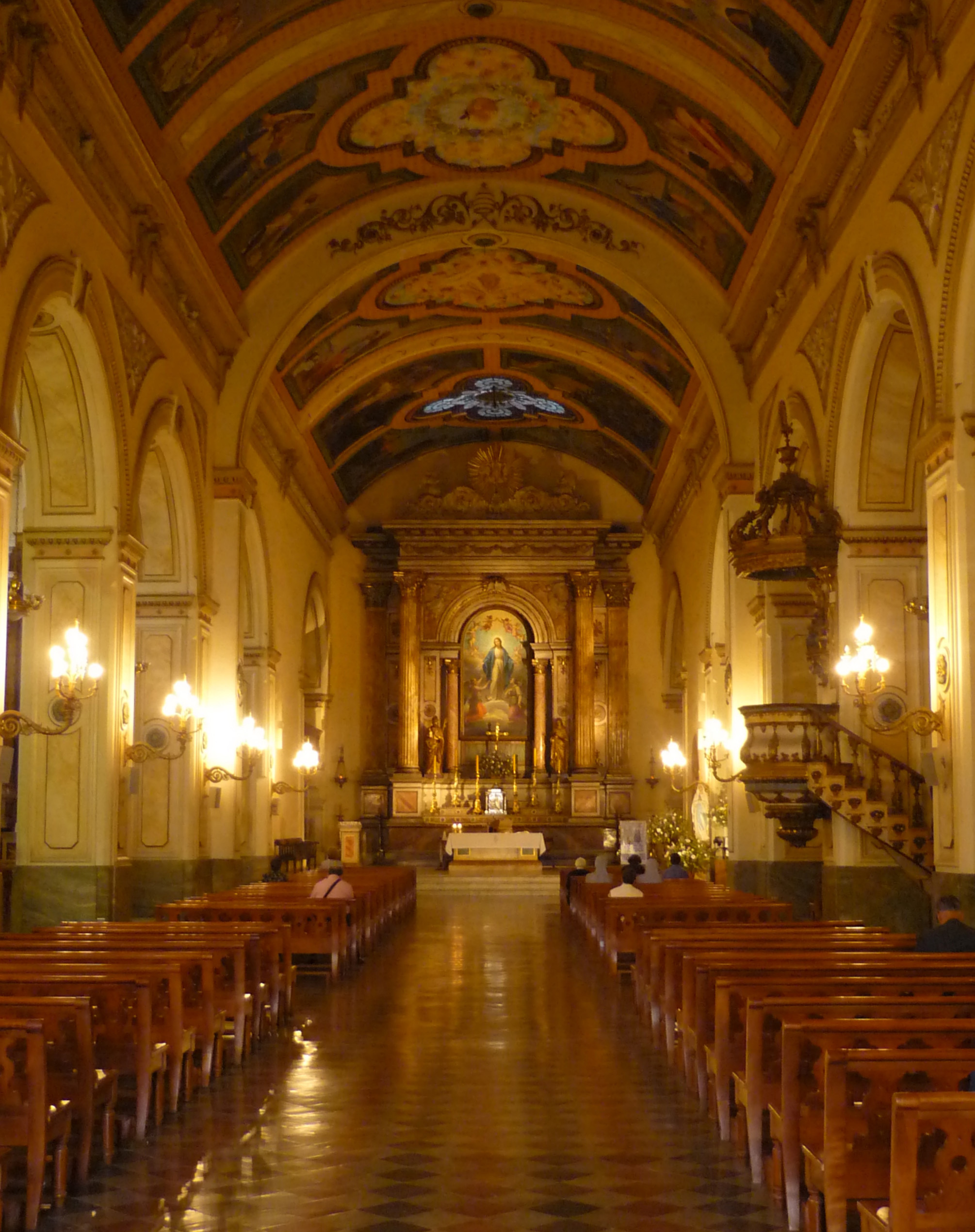
Iglesia San Agustín interior

Iglesia de San Agustín — Our Lady of Grace, commonly known as Church of St Augustine or Templo de San Agustín, is owned by the Order of Saint Augustine. It is a Catholic church, located at the southeast corner of Agustinas and Estado streets, in downtown Santiago, Chile.

== History ==
Built in 1625, Iglesia de San Agustín is the second oldest church in Chile after Saint Francis of Assisi's church. The Order of Saint Augustine in Chile was established within this church and monastery.

The first church was built in 1608, but has been since rebuilt. It is in the Spanish Colonial Baroque & Neoclassical architectural styles.

In the church is a wooden carving of Jesus Christ, known as Cristo de Mayo. According to local legend, the crown of thorns around the statue's head slipped down to its neck during the 1647 Santiago earthquake. When someone tried to move the crown back up to the statue's head, the face of Christ began to bleed and the ground started shaking. The crown has remained untouched, still around the statue's neck.

There is also a sub-altar dedicated to Saint Rita of Cascia, which contains a relic of hers (a small piece of bone).

== Architecture ==
The main facade of the church was refronted by Fermín Vivaceta, which gave it its present Neoclassical appearance. The remodeling work began in 1850. The facade features a balustrade-topped entablature, which rests on six Doric columns.
