= Mercado Central de Santiago =

Market in Chile

Central Market of Santiago
- Mercado Central de Santiago
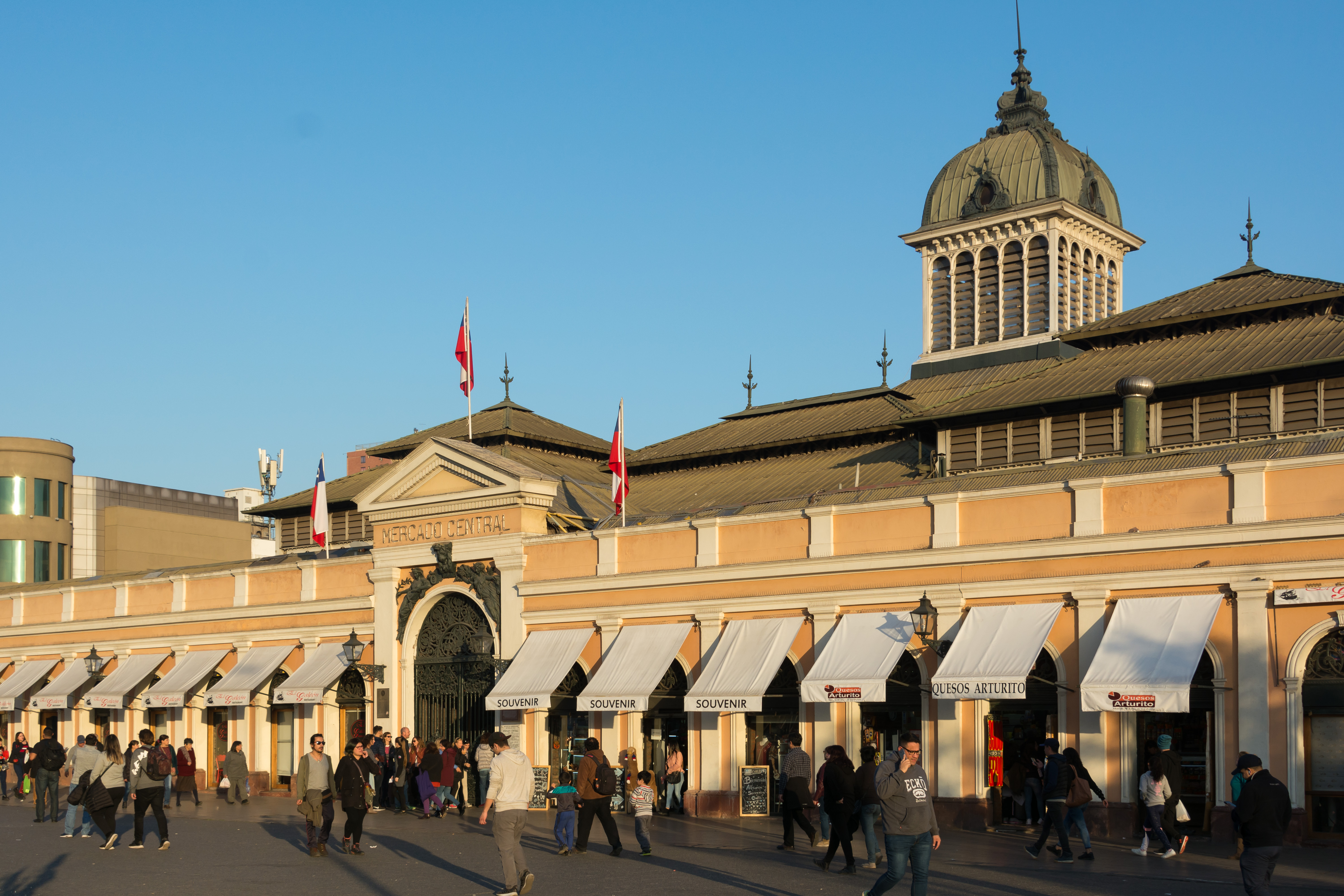
- North façade
- Interactive map of the Central Market of Santiago area

General information
- Classification: Historical Monument
- Location: Santiago, Chile
- Coordinates: 33°26′1″S 70°39′4″W
- Construction started: 1869
- Completed: 1872

Technical details
- Structural system: Cast iron
- Floor count: 2

Design and construction
- Architect: Fermín Vivaceta
- Structural engineer: Manuel Aldunate y Avaria

Website
- www.mercadocentral.cl

The Mercado Central de Santiago is the central market of Santiago de Chile. It was opened in 1872 and Fermín Vivaceta was in charge of its construction. The market replaced the Plaza del Abasto, which was destroyed by a fire in 1864.

The market is housed in a building in which its main feature is a cast-iron roof and supporting structure, which was fabricated by the Scottish firm R Laidlaw & Sons, Glasgow. Edward Woods and Charles Henry Driver took part in the design of the structure.

The metal structure stands on a square base and features a vaulted ceiling. Its intricate roof design consists of a central pyramidal roof crowned by a domed tower, which is surrounded by 8 smaller roofs with a two-tier design. The structure is enclosed by a masonry building.
