= Universidad Católica metro station =

Santiago metro station

Universidad Católica
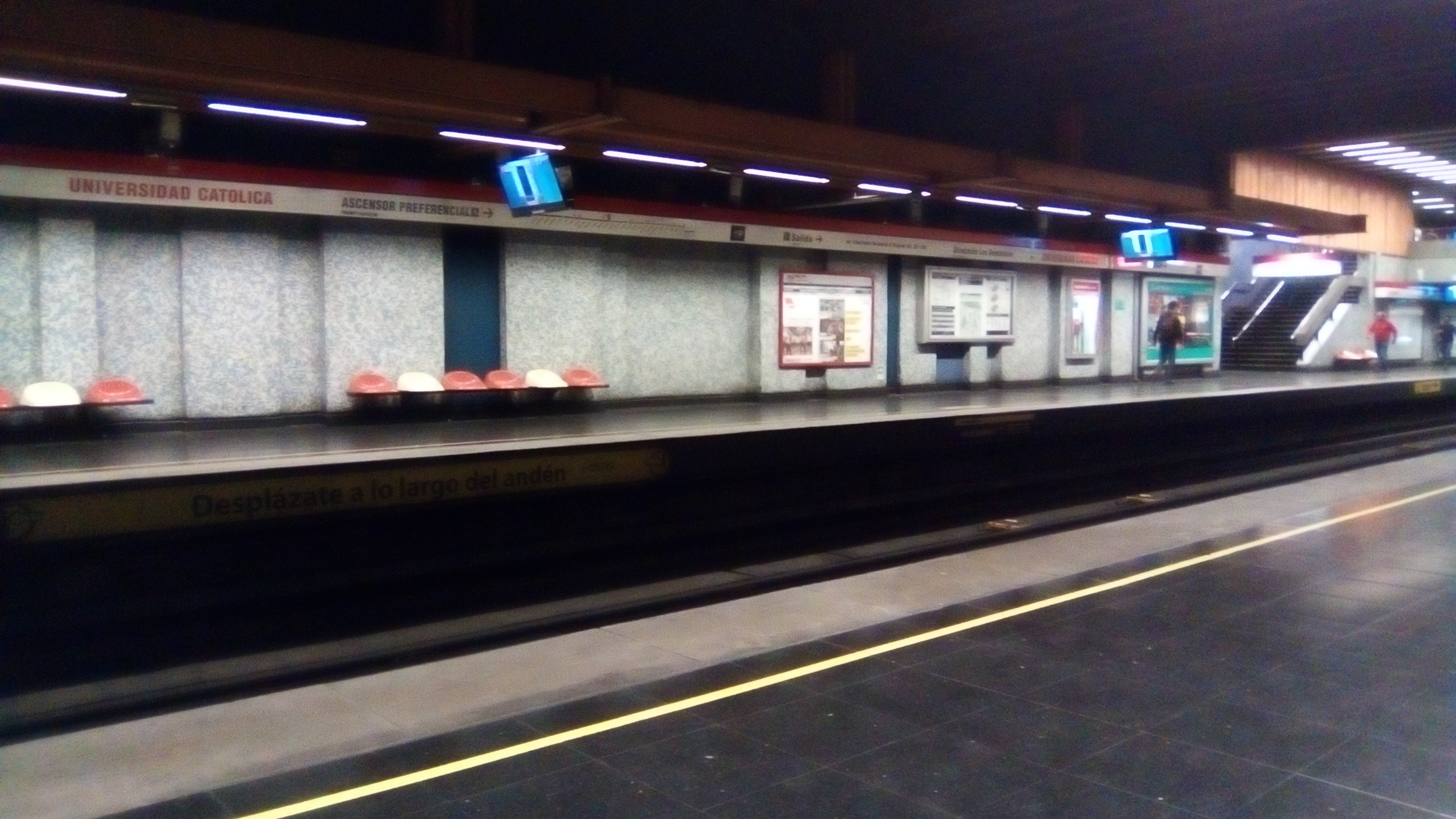

General information
- Location: Alameda / Portugal Avenue
- Coordinates: 33°26′24.8″S 70°38′25.39″W
- System: Santiago rapid transit
- Line: Line 1
- Platforms: 2 side platforms
- Tracks: 2
- Connections: Transantiago buses

History
- Opened: March 31, 1977

Services
Preceding station	Santiago Metro	Following station
Santa Lucía towards San Pablo	Line 1	Baquedano towards Los Dominicos
Location

Universidad Católica is an underground metro station on the Line 1 of the Santiago Metro, in Santiago, Chile. It provides access to the Centro Cultural Gabriela Mistral and is named after the Pontifical Catholic University of Chile, whose main administrative offices are housed in a building close to the station. The station was opened on 31 March 1977 as part of the extension of the line from La Moneda to Salvador.
