= Barrio Concha y Toro =

Coordinates: 33°26′44.08″S 70°39′57.30″W

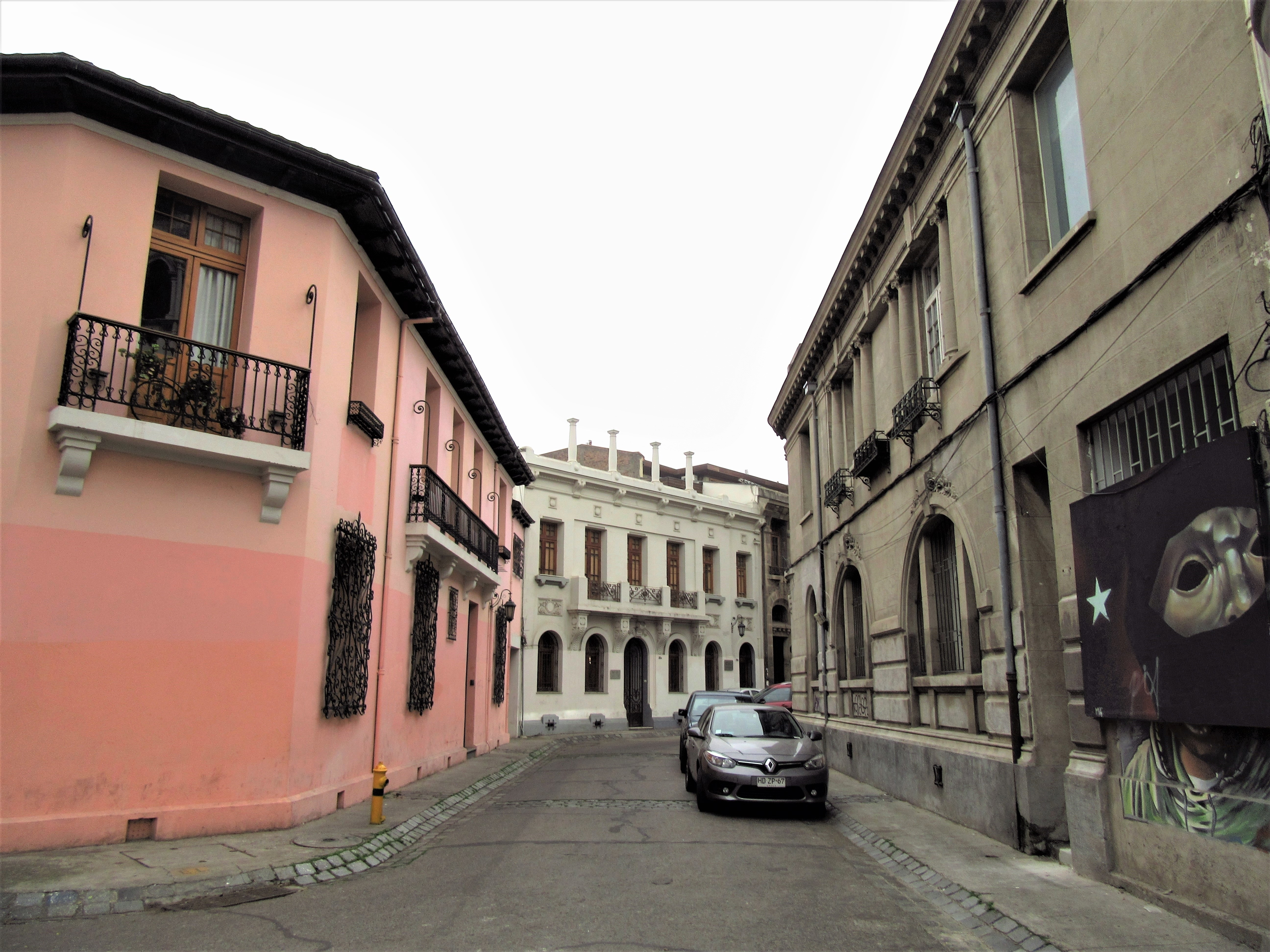
Concha y Toro Street in 2017.

Barrio Concha y Toro is a barrio in Santiago, Chile, with a medieval-like street plan influenced by the ideas of Camillo Sitte. The houses are built on the former site of the Díaz Gana Palace's park, which was divided into lots in 1915. The barrio's boundaries are defined by Brasil Avenue, Avenida Libertador General Bernardo O'Higgins, Cumming Avenue, Romero Street, Maturana Street and Erasmo Escala Street.
