= Santa Lucía metro station (Santiago) =

Santiago metro station

Santa Lucía
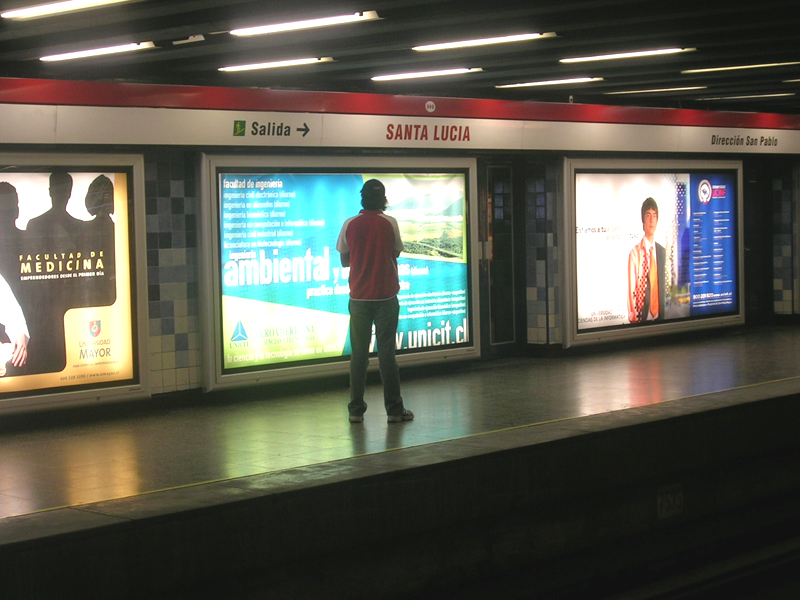

General information
- Location: Avenida Libertador General Bernardo O'Higgins / Avenida Miraflores
- Coordinates: 33°26′33.4″S 70°38′42.4″W
- System: Santiago rapid transit
- Line: Line 1
- Platforms: 2 side platforms
- Tracks: 2
- Connections: Red buses

History
- Opened: March 31, 1977; 2032

Services
| Preceding station | Santiago Metro | Following station |
|---|---|---|
| Universidad de Chile towards San Pablo | Line 1 | Universidad Católica towards Los Dominicos |
Location

Santa Lucia (in Spanish: Saint Lucy), is a station on the Santiago Metro in Santiago, Chile. It is underground, between the stations Universidad de Chile and Universidad Católica on the same line. It is located on Avenida Libertador General Bernardo O'Higgins, in the commune of Santiago. The station was opened on 31 March 1977 as part of the extension of the line from La Moneda to Salvador.

It has a regular flow of passengers that increases during the Metro's rush hours (mornings and afternoons). The station is in a mix of residential, business and educational zones.

In the immediate surroundings of the station, to the northeast is Santa Lucia Hill, and just by the North exit also is the National Library of Chile, a National Monument building located along the North sidewalk of Avenida Libertador General Bernardo O'Higgins. The station also is to the Avenida Miraflores and Avenida Santa Rosa, this latter being a major traffic axis.

It is expected that by 2032 this station will be combined with the future Line 9.

== MetroArte ==
The government of Portugal gave one of the first works of art that adorn the stations to Metro S.A. in the 1990s. This work is called Azulejos para Santiago and is composed by tiles in diverse blue and white tones.

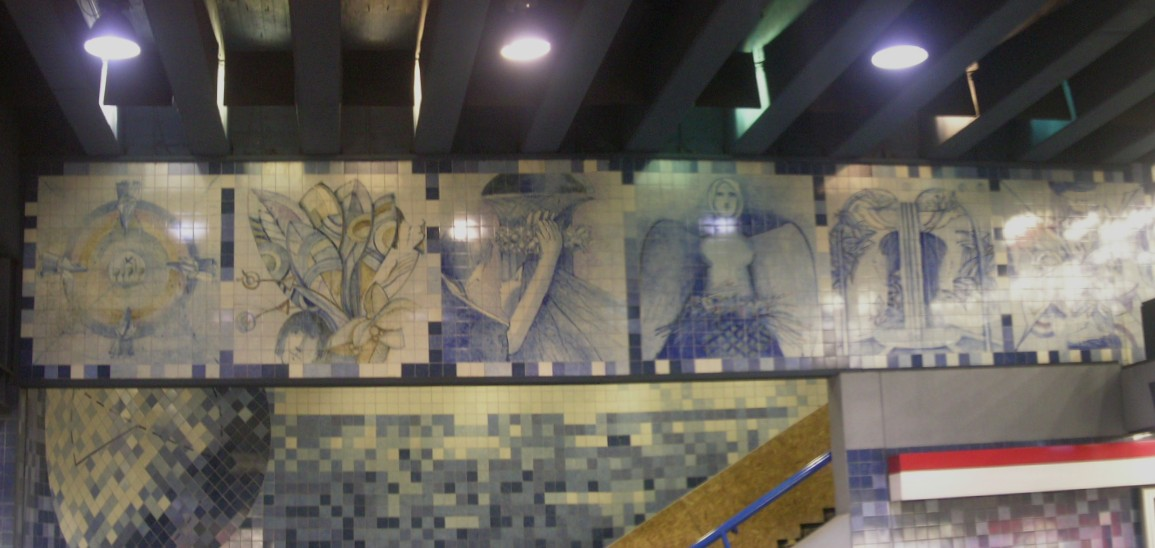
View of Tiles for Santiago

== Etymology ==
On February 12, 1541, the conqueror Pedro de Valdivia founded, according to the tradition, the city of Santiago at the bottom of a hill called Huelén by the natives. Valdivia renamed the hill Cerro Santa Lucia in honour of Saint Lucy. The station is just on the south face of the hill.
