= Lucien Hénault =

French architect

Lucien Henault
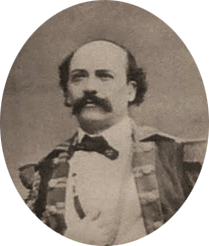
- Born: Lucien Ambroise Hénault; 30 January 1823; Bazoches een-Dunois (France)
- Died: 30 January 1908 (aged 85); Paris (France)
- Education: École nationale supérieure des beaux-arts
- Occupation: Architect
- Spouse: Marie Louise Isaline Marguin (married 1878 ) Marcelle Polo ( married 1893) [remarried]
- Parent(s): François Denis Hénault, Marie Madeleine Doussain
- Projects: Municipal Theater of Santiago, Building of the former National Congress of Chile, Archbishop's Palace of Santiago, Central House of the University of Chile

Lucien Ambroise Hénault (Bazoches-en-Dunois, January 30, 1823 - Paris, January 30, 1908) was a French architect and academic, noted for building and designing several of the main buildings in Santiago de Chile in the mid-19th century.

== Biography ==
He was the son of François Denis Hénault and Marie Madeleine Doussain. Between 1844 and 1853 he studied at the Paris School of Fine Arts (École nationale supérieure des beaux-arts), at which he was an outstanding pupil, earning a medal for his project for a villa at Choisy in 1852. His mentor was the architect and professor, Louis-Hippolyte Lebas.

He was contracted by the Government of Chile on October 31, 1856, through his plenipotentiary minister in France, Manuel Blanco Encalada, to take over as official architect of the government after the death of fellow Frenchman François Brunet de Baines in 1855.

His first task was to continue with the construction of public buildings in the city of Santiago de Chile, such as the Municipal Theater of Santiago (between 1856 and 1857), the National Congress (from 1857 and interrupted in 1860) and the Archbishop's Palace of Santiago (between 1869 and 1870).

In 1857 he was commissioned to design the Central House of the University of Chile, which Fermín Vivaceta began to build in 1863. Vivaceta was one of the first Chilean architects, a disciple of his and of Brunet de Baines. Other works by Hénault in Chile were the Church of the Sacred Hearts of Valparaíso, the Church of National Gratitude, the Hermitage and the Chapel of Santa Lucía Hill, the Palace and the Larraín Zañartu Palace.

In 1872 he left Chile to return to France. In Paris he married twice: the first with Marie Louise Isaline Marguin, on January 8, 1878; the second on March 4, 1893, with Marcelle Polo. He died in the French capital in January 1908.
