= Barrio París-Londres =

Coordinates: 33°26′41″S 70°38′54″W

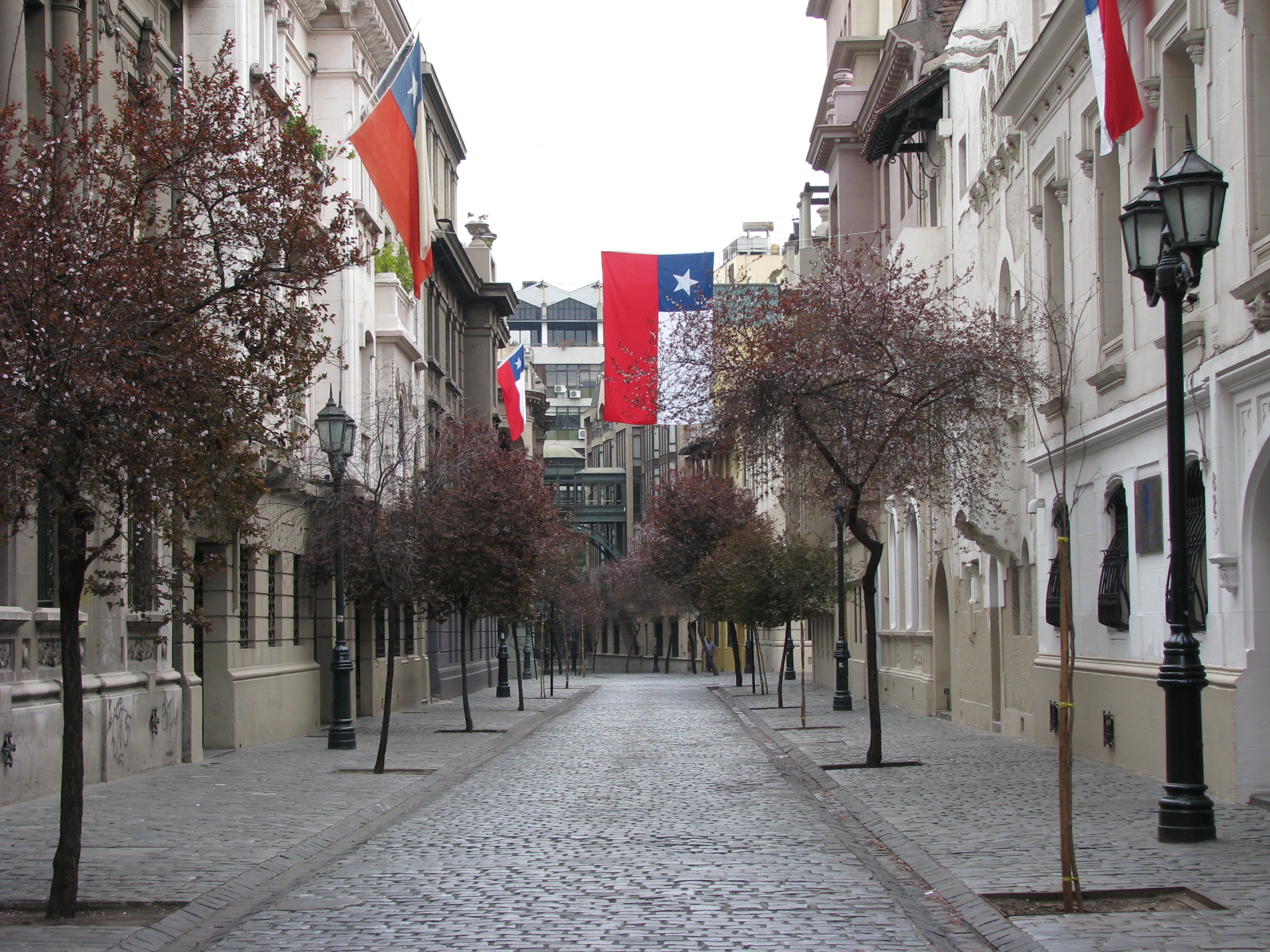
París street.

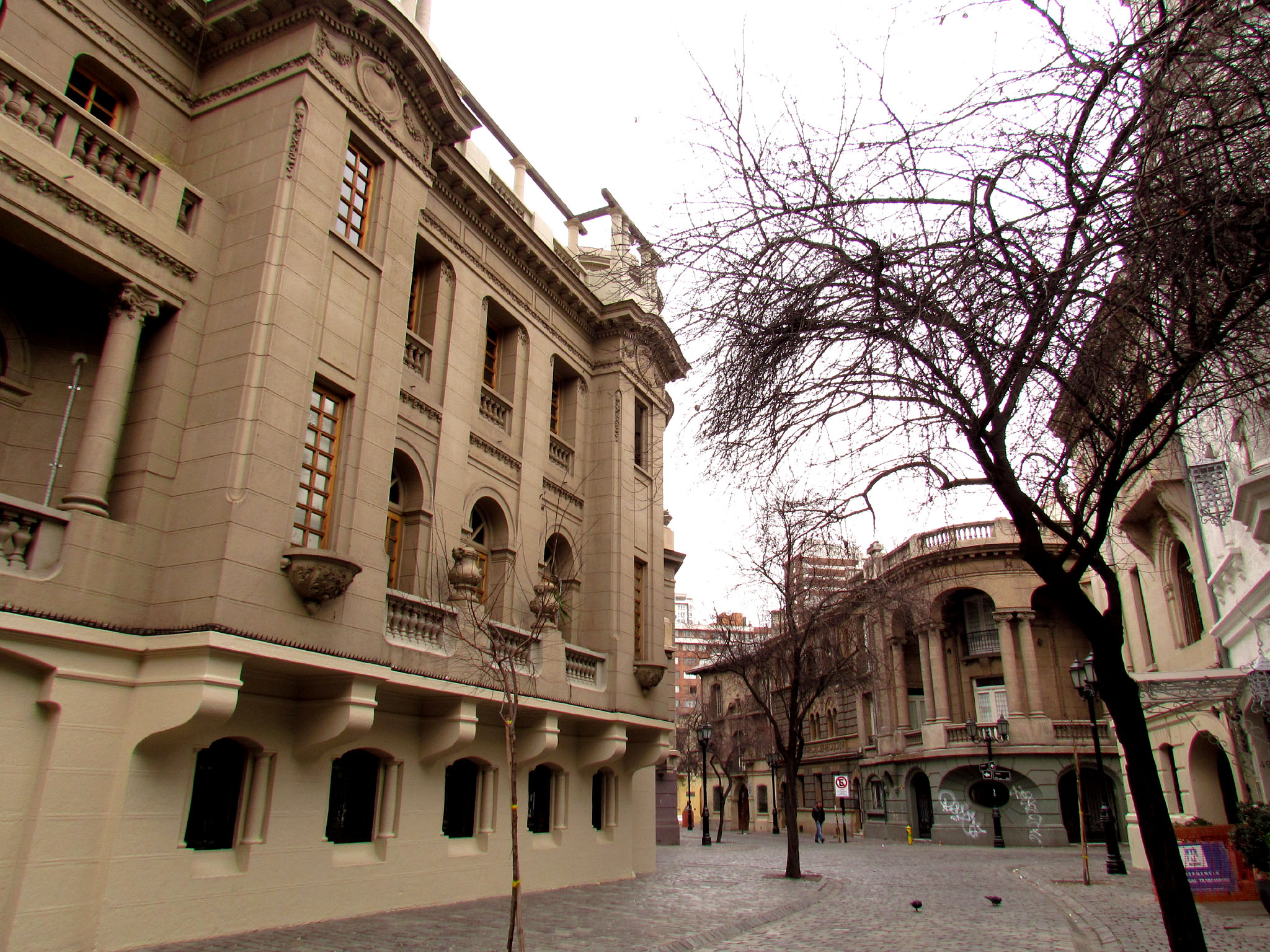
Londres street.

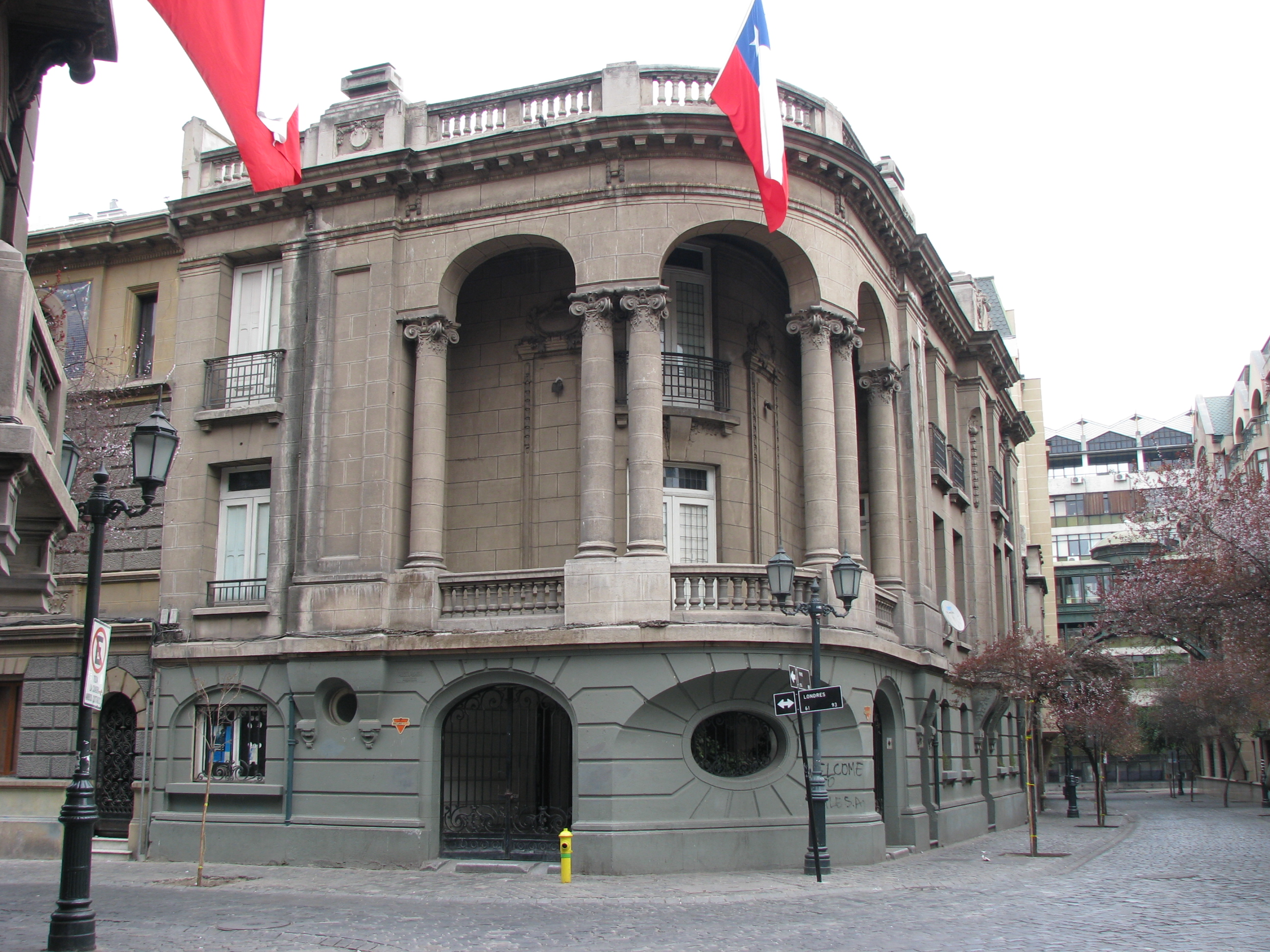
Headquarters of the Radical Party of Chile.

Barrio París-Londres is a barrio located in Santiago, Chile. The neighborhood intersects at Calle Londres and Calle París, located behind the San Francisco Church, in its former orchard. Barrio París-Londres features shops, hostels, hotels and cobble stone streets with renovated mansions, reminiscent of the Latin Quarter in Paris, France. The barrio was developed in 1923 by a group of architects, and consists of only two streets. The building at Calle Londres 38/40 is a former jail and torture facility, used during the Pinochet regime. Tiles in front of the building depict the names of former political prisoners who were held there.
