= Mario Toral =

Chilean painter and photographer

Mario Toral Muñoz
- En la playa de la casa amarilla
- Born: 12 February 1934 (age 92); Santiago, Chile
- Education: Montevideo, Uruguay High Art School, École nationale supérieure des Beaux-Arts, Paris
- Known for: Universidad de Chile metro station Mural, "Memoria Visual de una Nación" (Visual Memory of a Nation).
- Style: Modern
- Movement: Muralismo mexicano (Mexican Mural)
- Spouse: Aracy Amaral
- Awards: Medal of honor from the Pablo Neruda Foundation

Mario Toral Muñoz (born in Santiago, Chile, on 12 February 1934) is a Chilean painter and photographer.

== Career ==
At the age of 16, Toral moved to Buenos Aires, where he saved money to enroll in the Escuela de Bellas Artes (School of Fine Arts) in Montevideo, Uruguay. He later went to Brazil, where at 21 the first exhibition of his work was shown at the Sao Paulo Museum of Modern Art. In 1957, Toral moved to France, where he studied at the School of Fine Arts in Paris.

Between 1973 and 1992, Toral lived in New York City. Major works completed during this period include Prisioneras de Piedra (Prisoners of Stone, 1974–1977) and Mascaras (Masks, 1979–1981).

Returning to Chile in 1992, Toral was a professor at the Pontifical Catholic University of Chile and Dean of the Faculty of Arts at Finis Terrae University.

In September 2007 Toral received the medal of honor from the Pablo Neruda Foundation in recognition of his career trajectory and contributions to Chilean culture. Toral had collaborated with the poet Pablo Neruda, illustrating a number of his poems, including a 1963 edition of Alturas de Macchu Picchu.

== Memoria Visual de una Nación ==
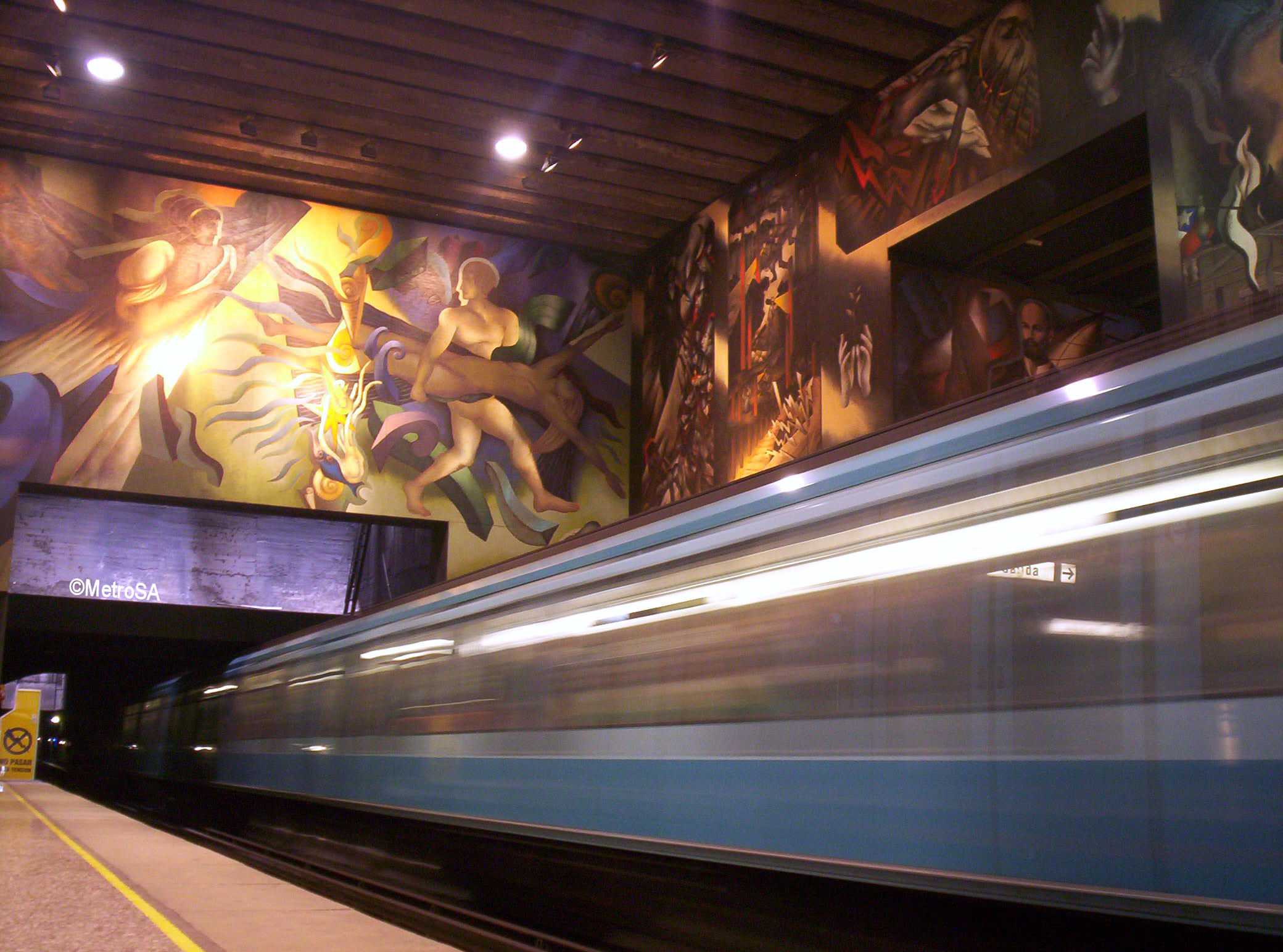
«Memoria visual de una nación» (Visual memory of a nation), in Universidad de Chile metro station.

In 1999, Toral completed the mural Memoria Visual de una Nación (Visual Memory of a Nation), located at the Universidad de Chile metro station in Santiago. The painting measures 1200 square meters, is located in the platform area and divided into two sections: "Pasado" (“Past”), and "Presente" (“Present”). It shows fragments of Chile's history, from the violent Spanish conquest to the modern day. Toral has said of the mural,

“I received the invitation to do this mural when I was living in New York. I immediately thought of the history of Chile as a theme as it was time to rediscover my origins after being away for so long; I also thought to narrate the story in such a way that we would all feel represented.

I researched for two years, travelling around the country, reading and interviewing historians, poets and representatives of our original peoples. Afterwards, between 1995 and 1998, I worked in the Neptuno workshops, where a metallic structure was built that replicated the Universidad de Chile metro station and the 1200 square meters I was to paint.”

In 2011, Lonely Planet named Universidad de Chile one of its "Subway stations worth getting off the train for", and in 2014, the BBC named it one of the seven most beautiful stations in the world.

== See also ==
- List of Chilean artists
- Chilean art
