= Fermín Vivaceta =

Chilean architect and firefighter

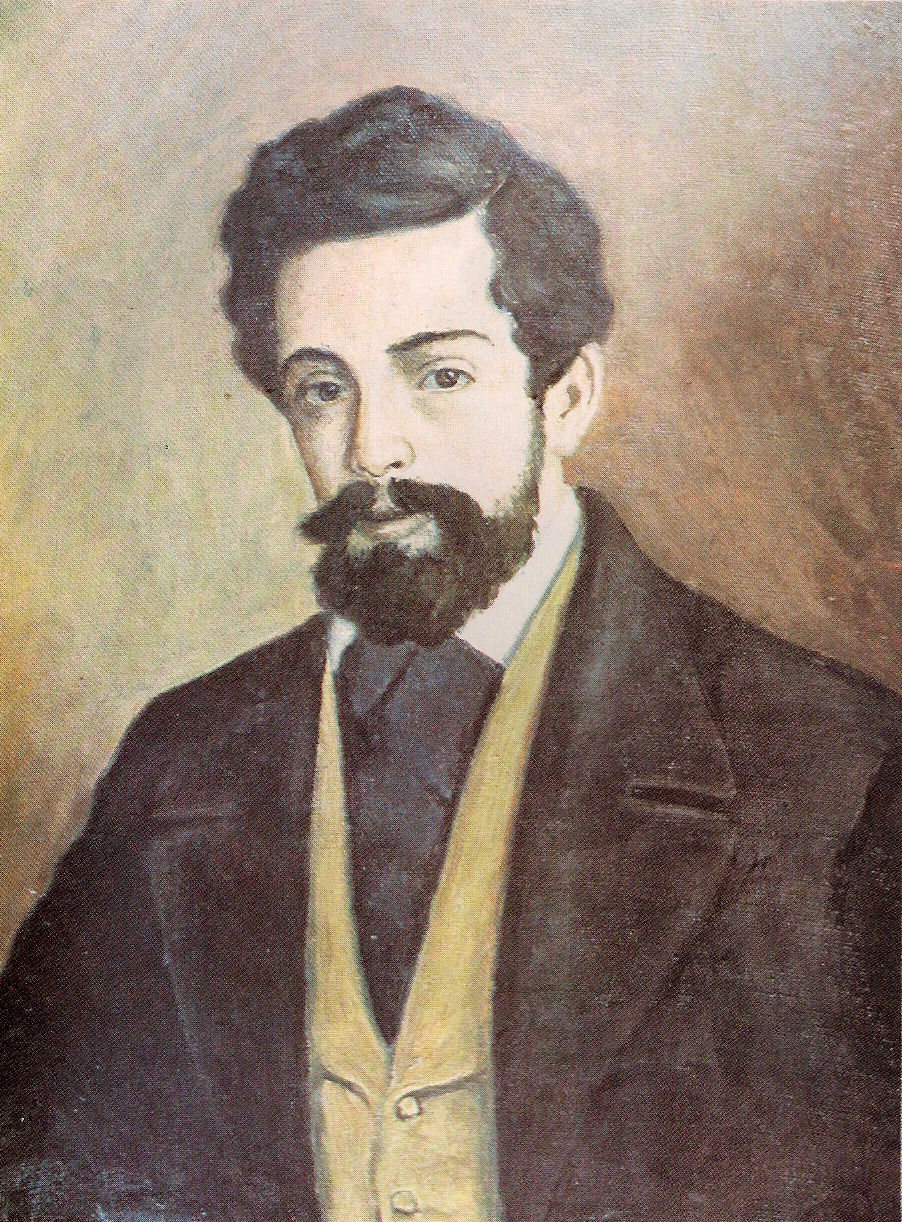
- Born: Fermín Vivaceta Rupio; January 12, 1829; Santiago, Chile
- Died: February 21, 1890 (aged 61); Valparaíso, Chile
- Occupations: Architect, teacher and firefighter
- Known for: Iglesia de San Agustín; Casa Central de la Universidad de Chile; Mercado Central de Santiago; Alameda de las Delicias

Fermín Vivaceta Rupio (January 12, 1829 – February 21, 1890) was a Chilean architect, teacher and firefighter.

== Life ==
Vivaceta was born in Santiago, Chile on January 12, 1829. He was the son of Fermín Vivaceta, an Argentinean citizen residing in Chile, and Juana Rupio. He was from a working-class family. From the age of thirteen, he was employed as an apprentice in a furniture factory during the day, while studying at night. In 1846, he attended Instituto Nacional to study drawing, a course that was arranged by the government of Manuel Bulnes to train workers in industrial drawing. He also studied geometry and general mathematics.

In 1850, he was one of the first students of the Academia de Bellas Artes and became an architect. His architectural work was influenced by his mentor, the French architect François Brunet de Baines, who was also his partner in various of his works. He received commissions to design important buildings, including the Casa Central de la Universidad de Chile, the bell tower of the Iglesia de San Francisco, the seats of the Alameda de las Delicias, the Mercado Central de Santiago, the Iglesia de los Doce Apóstoles in Valparaíso and the Fuerte Bueras. According to various experts, his best work was the towers of the Iglesia San Agustín.

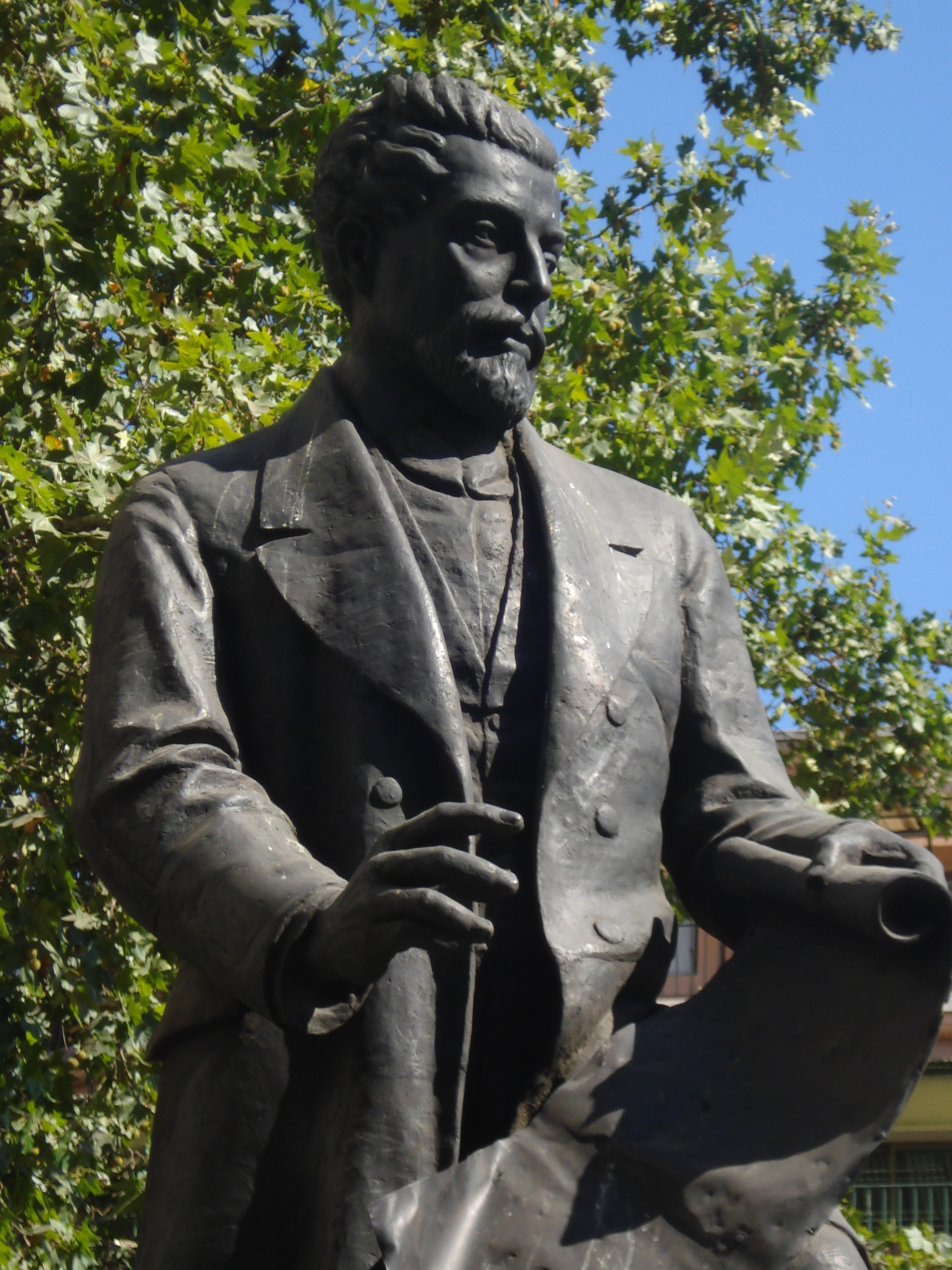
Statue of Fermín Vivaceta, by José Carocca, Santiago.

In 1858, he went on to be a member of the board of directors of the Sociedad de Instrucción Pública. Álvaro Covarrubias, Domingo Santa María and Benjamín Vicuña Mackenna were also members of the board. His major achievement as a member of that board was the construction and development of evening schools for the education of workers, in which he also served as a teacher and inspector.

In 1865, during the Chincha Islands War, he moved to Valparaíso to serve as a volunteer firefighter for the city, living there for the rest of his life. Some years later, he became part of the Sociedad de Artesanos de Valparaíso and, in January 1877, along with 48 associates, founded the Sociedad de Trabajadores, created to eradicate tenements in the city and build decent houses for low-income workers.

Despite his moderate political participation, he supported the Liberal candidatures of Domingo Santa María, José Tomás Urmeneta and Benjamín Vicuña Mackenna.

In 1882, Vivaceta suffered a severe paralysis, losing sensitivity on the left side of his body. He remained in bad health until his death occurred on February 21, 1890.

== Homages ==
The former Camino de Los Hornillos, in the northern part of Santiago, was renamed as the Avenida Fermín Vivaceta. On October 3, 1953, a monument was erected on that avenue, which was later relocated to the intersection of the Alameda and Diagonal Paraguay.
