= Antônio Henrique Amaral =

Brazilian painter and printmaker (1935–2015)

Antonio Henrique Amaral
- Born: 24 August 1935; São Paulo, Brazil
- Died: 24 April 2015 (aged 79); São Paulo, Brazil
- Known for: Painting
- Movement: Current artist

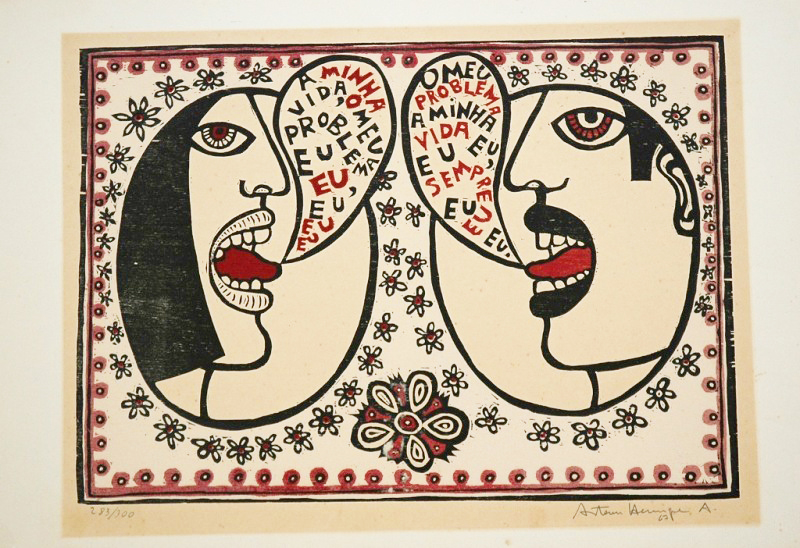

Antonio Henrique Amaral (24 August 1935 in São Paulo, Brazil – 24 April 2015 in São Paulo) was a Brazilian painter and printmaker. He is best known for his images' artistic and political critiques in the form of a series of paintings of bananas that have been mutilated by forks and ropes.

== Background ==
Amaral was born in 1935 in São Paulo, Brazil. He received his Bachelor of Arts degree in Law from the Universidade de São Paulo in São Paulo, Brazil. His interest in art stemmed from a visit to the 1st Biennial in São Paulo in 1951, where he was intrigued by the modern art he saw. In 1952, he took drawing classes from Roberto Sambonet through the São Paulo Museum of Modern Art. Later, in 1957, he entered the School of Engraving and was trained to do woodcuts and linocuts by Lívio Abramo. Amaral's first solo exhibition came in 1958 when he showed a group of engravings at the São Paulo Museum of Modern Art. In 1959 Amaral enrolled in the Pratt Graphic Institute in New York City where he learned wood engraving from Shiko Munakata and W. Rogalsky. In 1964, there was a coup d’état in Amaral's native Brazil that replaced the democratic government with a military dictatorship. This new government under the military juntas and the sociopolitical and economic effects it had would become the focus of many of his later paintings. In 1967, Amaral opened an exhibition of woodcuts entitled “O meu e o seu” (“Mine and Yours”), after which he switched to painting as his primary medium. From 1968 to 1975, he painted a series of banana paintings, which he is most famous for. Amaral traveled between Brazil and New York since the early 1970s, until his death.

== Influences ==
The banana was Amaral's favorite subject and symbolic representation, but he was not the first Brazilian painter to use it. Albert Eckhout (1610–1665), the Dutch Brazilian painter from the 17th century, also associated the banana with the region that would later become Brazil. Antonio Henrique Amaral's own great-aunt, Tarsila do Amaral (1886–1973), also used the banana tree and leaf as symbolic of Brazil in the background of many of her paintings. Lasar Segall (1891–1957) also used banana trees as identification for Brazilian people in his painting, Bananal (1927). These artists all contributed to the emergence of the banana as a symbol of Brazil that Amaral would later adopt.

=== Tropicalismo ===
The Tropicalismo movement that occurred in Brazil was mostly a musical movement, although it also had some aspects of literature, poetry, and visual art. The movement was a “cycle of intense creative activity and cultural transformation” as well as a revival of the Antropofagia movement headed by Tarsila do Amaral in the 1920s and 30s. The movement concerned itself with cultural cannibalism in order to create something that is uniquely Brazilian. The Tropicalismo Movement, as well as Amaral's banana paintings that fell under that category of Tropicalismo, coincided with the political upheaval of the coup d’état and later repression under the military dictatorship.

== The Banana Paintings ==
In 1964, General Humberto De Alencar Castelo Branco led a coup that replaced the existing government with a military junta. There was a severe recession, which led to popular dissatisfaction with the government. The government responded to peaceful protests with Institutional Act No. 5, which closed Congress, dissolved the veneer of democracy that existed at the time, allowed the regime to arrest, imprison without habeas corpus, and to censor, outlaw criticism, and repress the populace harshly. This is when the dictatorship tortured and often murdered anyone even suspected of opposing it. Without recourse to dialogue or democracy, a small portion of the opposition took to guerrilla resistance such as high-profile kidnappings in order to demand their comrades be freed from the dictatorship's torture chambers, and bank robberies. Among other things, Amaral's banana paintings reflected the human rights abuses of the regime and its support by the United States.

From 1968 to 1975, Antonio Henrique Amaral painted two series of paintings focused solely on bananas. The first, painted mainly from 1968 to 1972, was titled Brasilia, while the second, from 1973 to 1974, was titled Campos de batallha, or Battlefields. Brasiliana was more of a banana festival or, as the Brazilians would say, “bananas to sell and to give away.” These bananas were generally less corrupted than Amaral's later bananas but by the end of the series, these too have begun to rot and become entangled in ropes, mimicking the parrot's perch, the most common torture practice by the regime. The Campos de batalha series began around 1973, after Amaral moved back to New York City to avoid the intense censorship and possible retaliation by the Brazilian government. In this series, Amaral introduces sharp, metallic objects like forks and knives that penetrate and cut the bananas. Here he recreates what was happening to the bodies of those who dared resist the totalitarian regime.

The symbol of the banana was complex and diverse. In the 1920s, in Tarsila do Amaral’s day, the banana represented the unique culture and identity of Brazil. By the time Antonio Henrique Amaral began painting bananas, their meaning had been added too. In one regard, the banana symbolized the existence of the “banana republics.” Brazil was the largest exporter of bananas in the world, making up approximately twenty-three percent of all the world’s bananas. The economic importance of such a valuable resource was not lost on the Brazilians but they disliked it being the metaphor for behavior because unfortunately for the Brazilian, this export was taken advantage of and exploited by more prosperous countries, particularly the United States of America. Therefore the banana became synonymous with American imperialism and Brazilian dependence on richer countries. The banana mostly represented the people in general and the state of the nation politically, socially, and economically. By the perfectionism in his art, it seemed as though Amaral was attempting to reestablish the importance of the banana as a symbol. The first of the banana series, Boa vizinhanca (The Good Neighbor) in 1968 linked the Brazilian and American flags with a banana, thus pointing out the obvious connection between the two countries. He also changed the Brazilian motto on the flag to highlight the word Esso, which was a large U.S. oil company (now Exxon Mobil) operating in Brazil. After Boa vizinhança, his paintings became more critical and darker. Amaral began to paint his bananas as rotting, mutilated, turning into “mud,” bound with cord, etc. The banana being synonymous with the human body was “being victimized by colonialism, repression, and torture.” The transition from his earlier to his later banana paintings is characterized by the sharp, pointed objects in Battlefields. The objects are gray and black, reminding the viewer of technology and smoke. The forks and knives were metaphors for repression and torture. Battlefields is the confrontation between the inorganic and the organic, the machine and the body. The ropes and sharp objects directly represent the repression occurring under the military dictatorship. The fact that the Battlefield paintings are numbered not named reinforced the anonymity of the victims of the regime. By mutilating his bananas, Amaral reveals the problems wrought by the U.S.-backed regime in Brazil.

== Style ==
Amaral's style is full of close-ups and strange angles. He paints with photorealism and extreme detail. His use of yellows and greens refer to the Brazilian flag and therefore to Brazilians themselves. He often uses dramatic coloring, dark values, and much shadow. The verticals and diagonals he uses, especially in Alone in Green (1973) and Battlefield #31 (1974), bring stress and energy to his paintings, trying to evoke the feeling that what is going on in Brazil is wrong.

== Works ==
- Brasiliana, 1969
- Detalhe de Corda, 1972
- Campo de Batalha 3, 1973
- Campo de Batalha 9, 1973
- Campo de Batalha 22, 1974
- Campo de Batalha 25, 1974
- Campo de Batalha 30, 1974
- Detalhe de folha, 1978
- Expansão, 1977
- Bambu, água e terra, 1978
- Mar e Terra, 1984
- Jogos de Cena, 1993
- Instrumentos de amor e morte, 1995
- Torsos em branco, 1995
- Torsos, 1995
- Torsos V, 1995
- Anima & mania — a carta, 1996
- Anima & mania — a guihotina, 1996

== Exhibitions ==
- 1958 — São Paulo Museum of Modern Art, São Paulo, Brazil
- 1958 — Instituto de Arte Moderna do Chile, Santiago, Chile
- 1958 — Universidade de Concepción, Concepción, Chile
- 1959 — Pan American Union, Washington, DC, U.S.
- 1960 — Galeria Antigonovo, São Paulo, Brazil
- 1960 — Petite Galerie, Rio de Janeiro, Brazil
- 1963 — Galería Saber Vivir, Buenos Aires, Argentina
- 1963 — Galeria Mobilínea, São Paulo, Brazil
- 1967 — Galeria Astreia, SP, Brazil
- 1967 — Galeria Mirante das Artes, SP, Brazil
- 1968 — A.A.M.A.M. de São Paulo, Brazil
- 1969 — Galeria Copacabana Palace, Rio de Janeiro, Brazil
- 1970 — Galería Círculo 3, La Paz, Bolivia
- 1970 — Centro Pedagógico y Cultural de Portales, Cochobamba, Bolivia
- 1971 — Galeria Bonino, Rio de Janeiro, Brazil
- 1971 — Pan American Union, Washington, DC, US
- 1971 — Galería Merkup, México, DF, México
- 1971 — Elvaston Gallery, London, England
- 1972 — Galerie de Theatre, Geneve, Switzerland
- 1972 — Galeria Socar Seraphico, Brasília, Brazil
- 1972 — Galeria Bonfiglioli, SP, Brazil
- 1973 — Galeria San Diego, Bogotá, Colombia
- 1974 — Lee Ault & Co. Gallery, New York, New York
- 1975 — Galeria Bonfiglioli, SP, Brazil
- 1975 — Galeria Bonino, Rio de Janeiro, Brazil
- 1975 — Birmingham Art Museum, Birmingham, Alabama
- 1975 — Nashville Fine Arts Center, Nashville, Tennessee
