= Iglesia de San Francisco, Santiago de Chile =

17th-century Roman Catholic church

Coordinates: 33°26′36.57″S 70°38′52.05″W

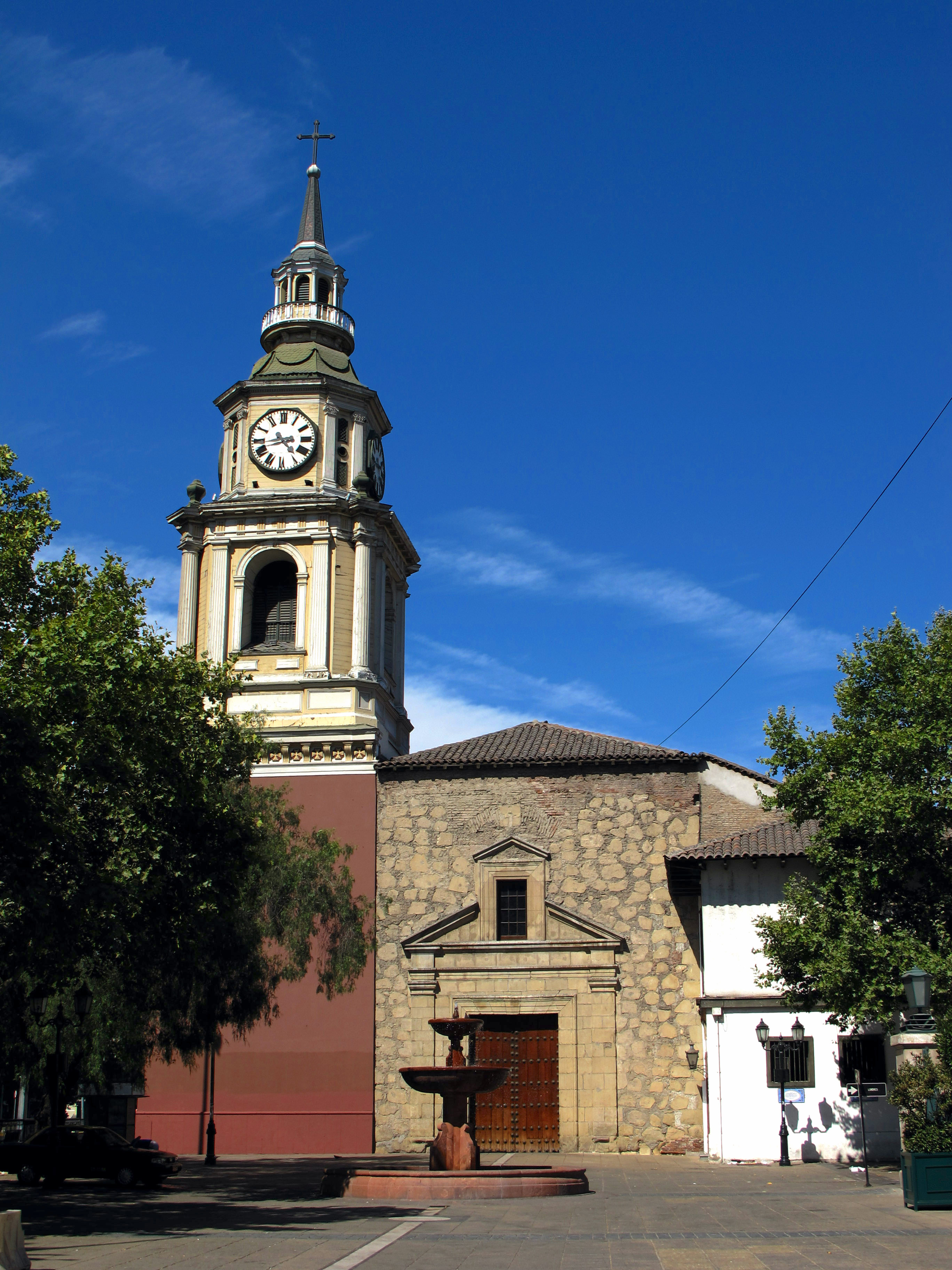
A view of the present facade of San Francisco Church in Santiago, Chile.

The San Francisco Church (Spanish: Iglesia de San Francisco) is a Franciscan church on Avenida Libertador General Bernardo O'Higgins, in the downtown of Santiago de Chile. The church, along with the adjacent convent, is one of the oldest colonial-era buildings in the country. It has been resistant to about 15 earthquakes of magnitude over 7.

== History ==
The church was consecrated in 1622. The first bell tower was destroyed by an earthquake in 1647 and its collapse caused damage in a part of the choir. The rest of the building successfully resisted it. In 1730 another earthquake badly damaged the rebuilt tower, which was demolished in 1751. The current bell tower is of Victorian architecture and was constructed in the mid-1800s. Its architect was Fermín Vivaceta and features a distinctive clock.

In the early years of the 20th century, a part of the convent was sold and demolished to build the Barrio París-Londres. The other part is the current home of the Museo Colonial.

== Architecture ==
The original Latin cross plan of the church was modified by the addition of side aisles, resulting in a rectangular plan. Its main facade has been remodeled three times. The church nave features a coffered ceiling, which is Mudéjar in style and its construction began in 1615.

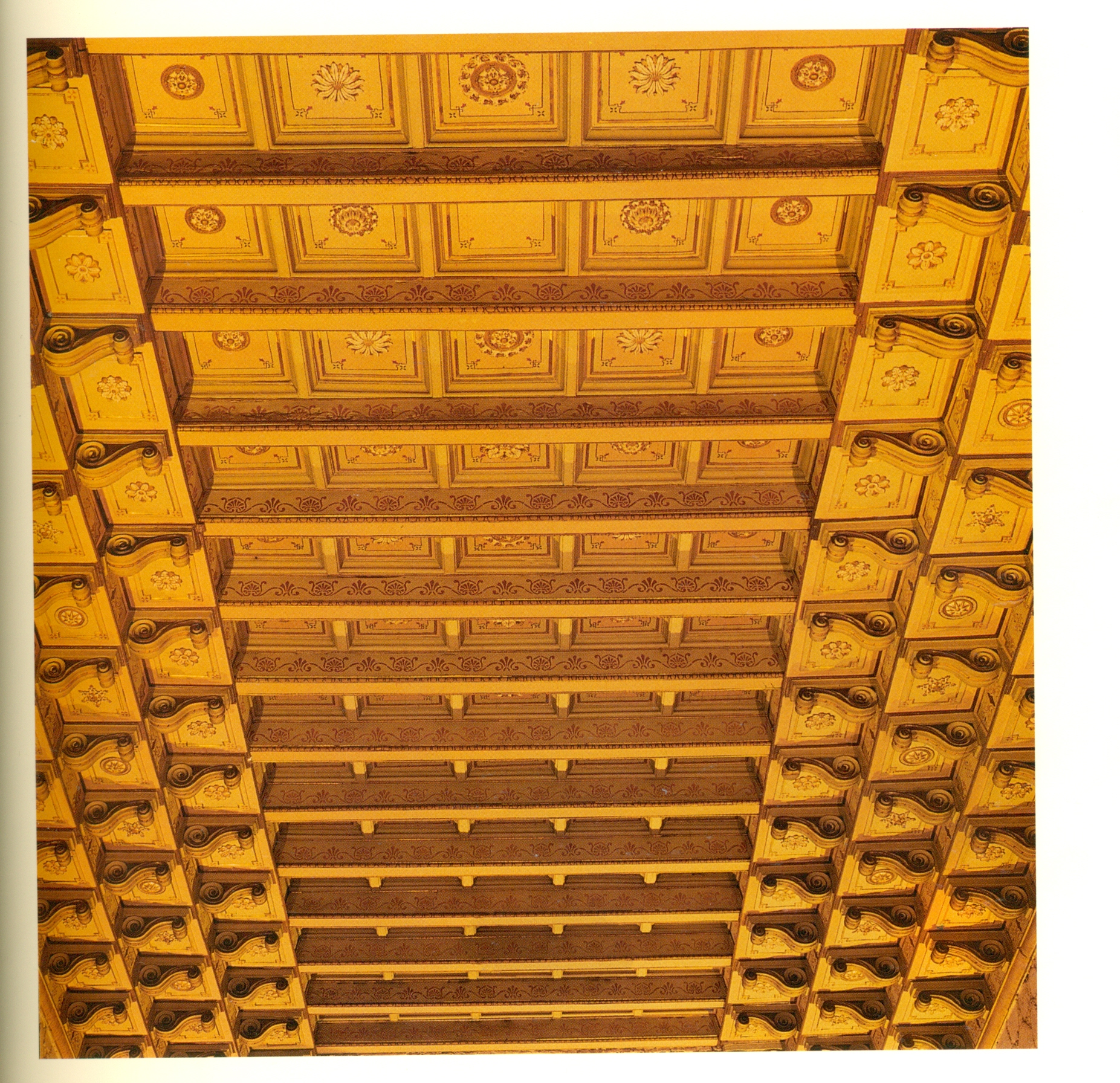
The ceiling of the nave
