= 1906 earthquake =

1906 earthquake may refer to:

- 1906 Aleutian Islands earthquake (great)
- 1906 Ecuador–Colombia earthquake (great, tsunami)
- 1906 Meishan earthquake (Taiwan)
- 1906 San Francisco earthquake (California, US) (great)
- 1906 Swansea earthquake (United Kingdom)
- 1906 Valparaíso earthquake (Chile) (great, tsunami)
- 1906 Manasi earthquake (China)

== See also ==
- List of earthquakes in 1906
