= Palacio de los Tribunales de Justicia de Valparaíso =

Courthouse in Valparaíso, Chile

Coordinates: 33°02′22″S 71°37′48″W

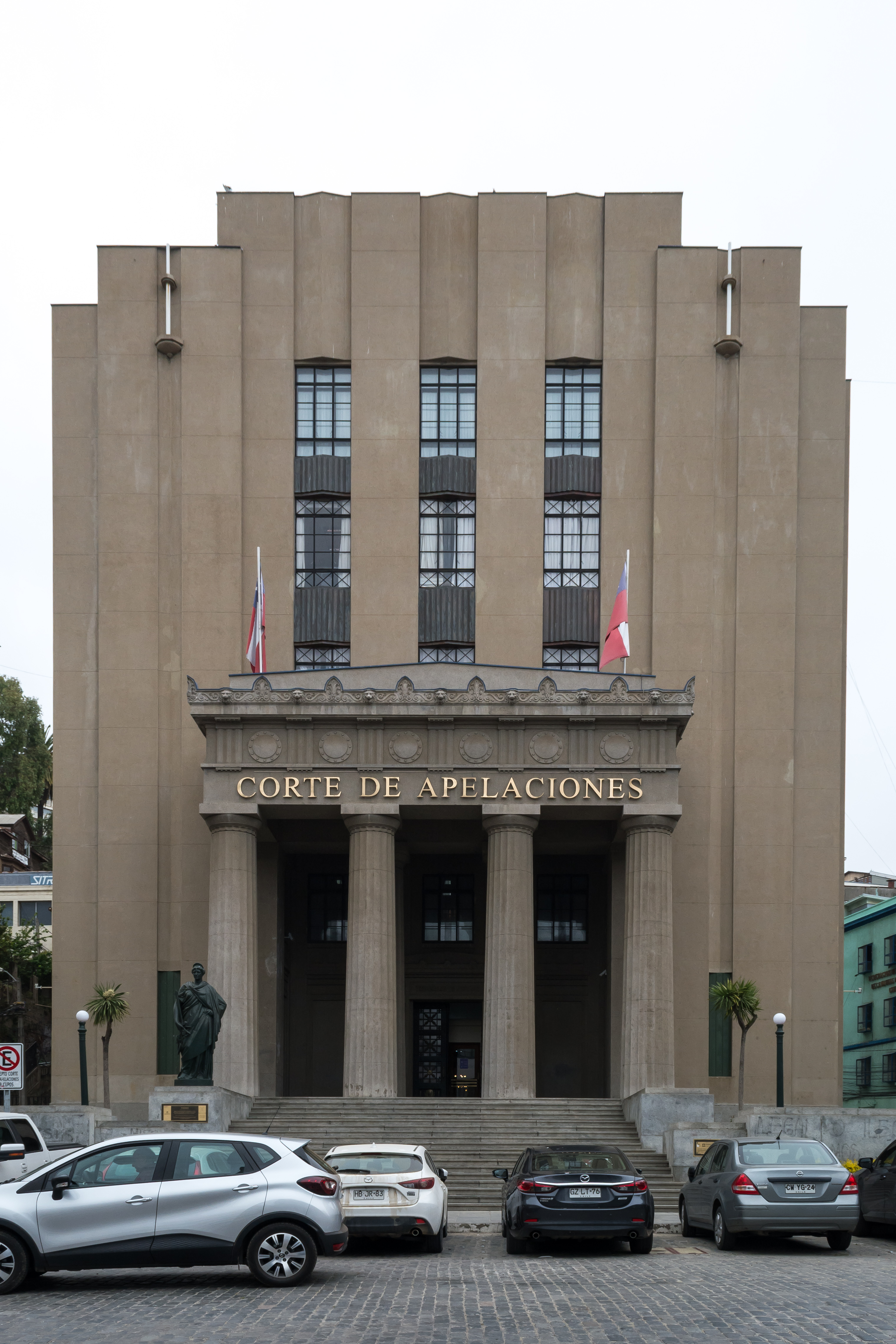

General information
- Location: Valparaíso, Chile

Design and construction
- Architect: Augusto Geiger

The Palacio de los Tribunales de Justicia de Valparaíso is a courthouse housing the Court of Appeals for the Valparaíso Region of Chile. It is located at the feet of the Cerro Alegre, in the city of Valparaíso. The Edificio Armada de Chile and the Sotomayor Square are nearby.

== History ==
The present building is built on land formerly occupied by the Augustine friars, until the land was expropriated, at the beginning the Republican period of Chile, to build the first theater in the city. A customs warehouse was built on that site in 1839, which operated until the late 19th century when courts were housed in the building. It was demolished in 1903.

The Palacio de Justicia was rebuilt and inaugurated in 1939, under the supervision of architect Augusto Geiger, in a Historicist style with a Greco-Roman portico and Art Deco elements.

A statue of Themis stands in front of the building, which was moved several times before arriving at its current location when the building was inaugurated. Unlike other allegorical personifications of Justice, the statue lacks a blindfold on her eyes and has an unbalanced beam balance, which has caused the statue is surrounded by myths and legends.
