= Aleutian Islands earthquake =

Aleutian Islands earthquake may refer to:

- 1906 Aleutian Islands earthquake
- 1946 Aleutian Islands earthquake
- 2014 Aleutian Islands earthquake
