= Fernand de Montessus de Ballore =

French soldier and seismologist

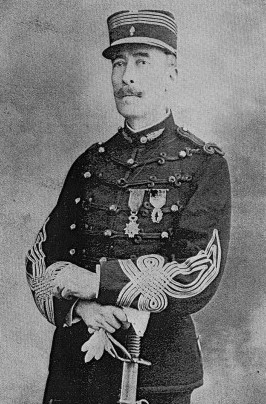

Fernand Jean Batiste Marie Montessus de Ballore (19 June 1851 – 31 January 1924) was French nobleman, army officer and pioneer seismologist who worked in Chile.

De Ballore was born in a noble Burgundy family in Dompierre-sons-Sanvignes and was educated at the École Polytechnique in Paris in 1871 with training under Mareschal Foch. In 1881 he was posted as part of the French mission to El Salvador under President Zaldivar to train where he became interested in earthquakes. Salvadorian artillery officers. His wife Jeanne-Rosalie Poussigue also moved with him. He took an interest in the local pottery. He was also involved in the war between El Salvador and Guatemala. In 1885 he moved back to France and worked at the Ecole Polytechnique documenting earthquakes around the world. His catalogue covered 170,000 incidents and he found some geographical patterns including a concentration of quakes in the Alpine-Caucasian-Himalayan zone and around the Pacific. He introduced a system of quantifying intensities. In 1888 he was made a member of the French academy for his work on seismology. In 1906, following the Valparaiso quake, he was involved in founding the Seismological Observatory in Chile, Santiago, under Pedro Montt, and on his retirement in 1907 from the army he was posted as the head of the seismological observations service. More than 30 seismometers were established at various locations. He also held courses in Chile on earthquake-resistant construction. He died there and two of his books were published after his death by his brother Robert.
