= Iglesia de la Matriz =

Church in Valparaíso, Chile

Coordinates: 33.0363°S 71.6322°W

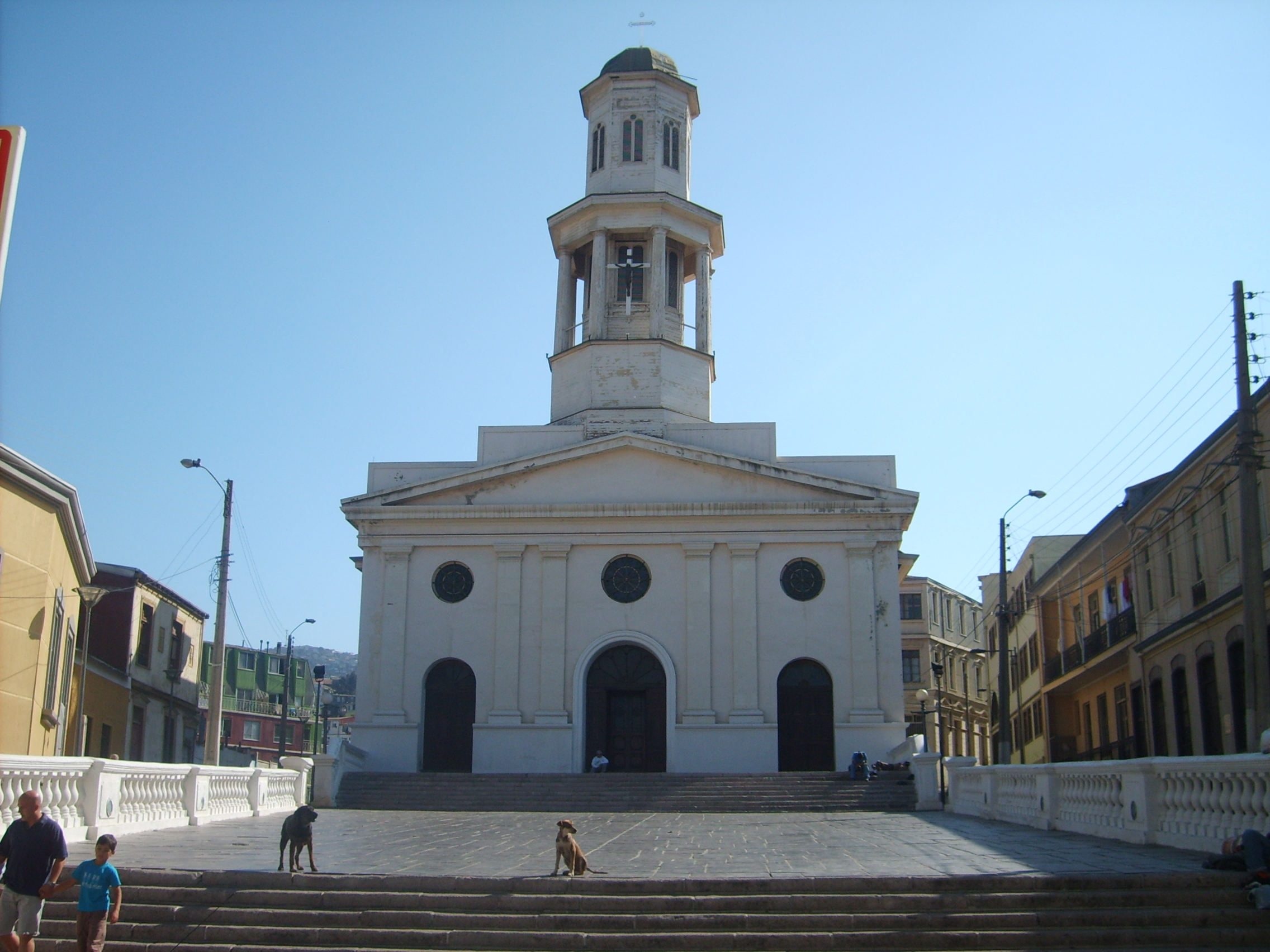
Iglesia de la Matriz

The Iglesia de La Matriz del Salvador (The Matriz Church of the Saviour) is a church in the city of Valparaíso, Chile. Located in the heart of the port district (Barrio Puerto) of the city, surrounded by cobblestone streets and houses, it has a historical importance in the city and was declared a National Monument of Chile in 1971.

== History ==
=== Origins ===
In 1559, the Bishop of Santiago, Rodrigo Marmolejo, founded the first temple in Valparaiso, a small chapel that was really little more than a hut. From this point as the settlement grew a series of successive religious congregations: Augustinian (1627), Franciscan (1664), Order of the Blessed Virgin Mary of Mercy (1715), Congregation of the Sacred Hearts of Jesus and Mary (1834) and Jesuits (1850) used the church. Wealthy local families developed the town and church giving it the distinctive architectural style that it has today.

=== Destruction and reconstruction ===
In 1578, Sir Francis Drake was said to have devastated the port and looted the chapel, taking its treasures and a chalice of silver. During the 17th and 18th century the church suffered pirate attacks. The church has also had a very uncertain history given the frequency of earthquakes which have gutted the building. Since the initial foundation, three churches have been successively erected on the site of the first chapel.

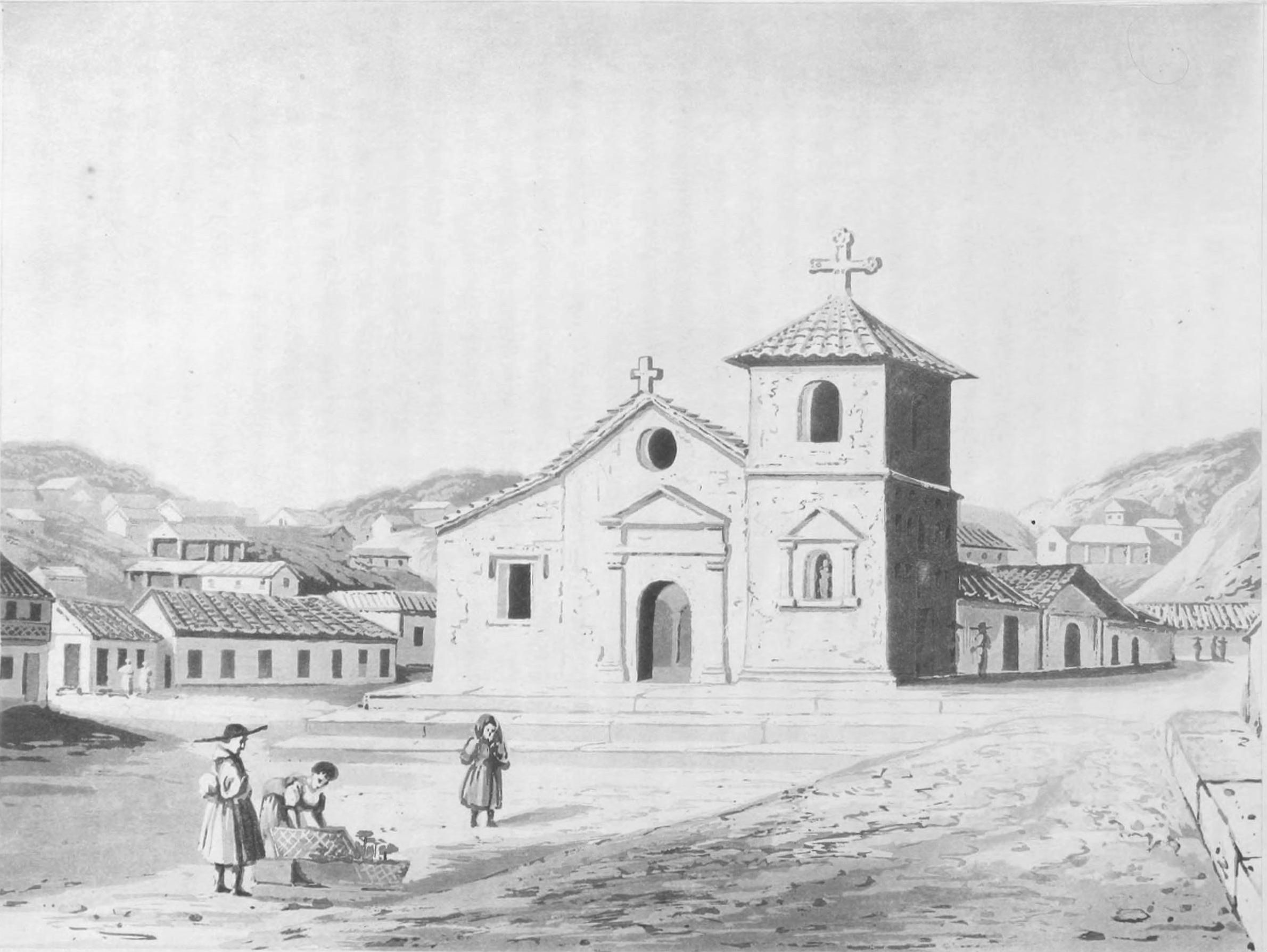
Iglesia de la Matriz in 1822 painted by an English artist shortly before the earthquake

In November 1822 an earthquake affected the church to the extent it had to be rebuilt stone by stone but this was not done quickly. The church remained a ruin for over a decade until reconstruction began in 1837, finished in 1842, under the direction of priest Jose Antonio Riobío.

This fourth construction, is the one that still stands today.

In 1868, a quite unusual situation took place in the church when it was used as a voting venue for the elections.

== Architectural style ==
The church of a typical basilical style, but is built in a way to represent three ships in a rectangular fashion, separated by two waters. The main facade stands out with its classic composition. Eight columns surround the body of the church and the interior walls are decorated with zenithal paintings. There are two main influences which make up the interior of the church including this classicist style of the tower, and the 18th century Creole style represented by its great heavy walls of adobe brick and the ceiling covered with clay roofing tiles.
