= Barrio Puerto =

Coordinates: 33°2′12.66″S 71°37′47.24″W

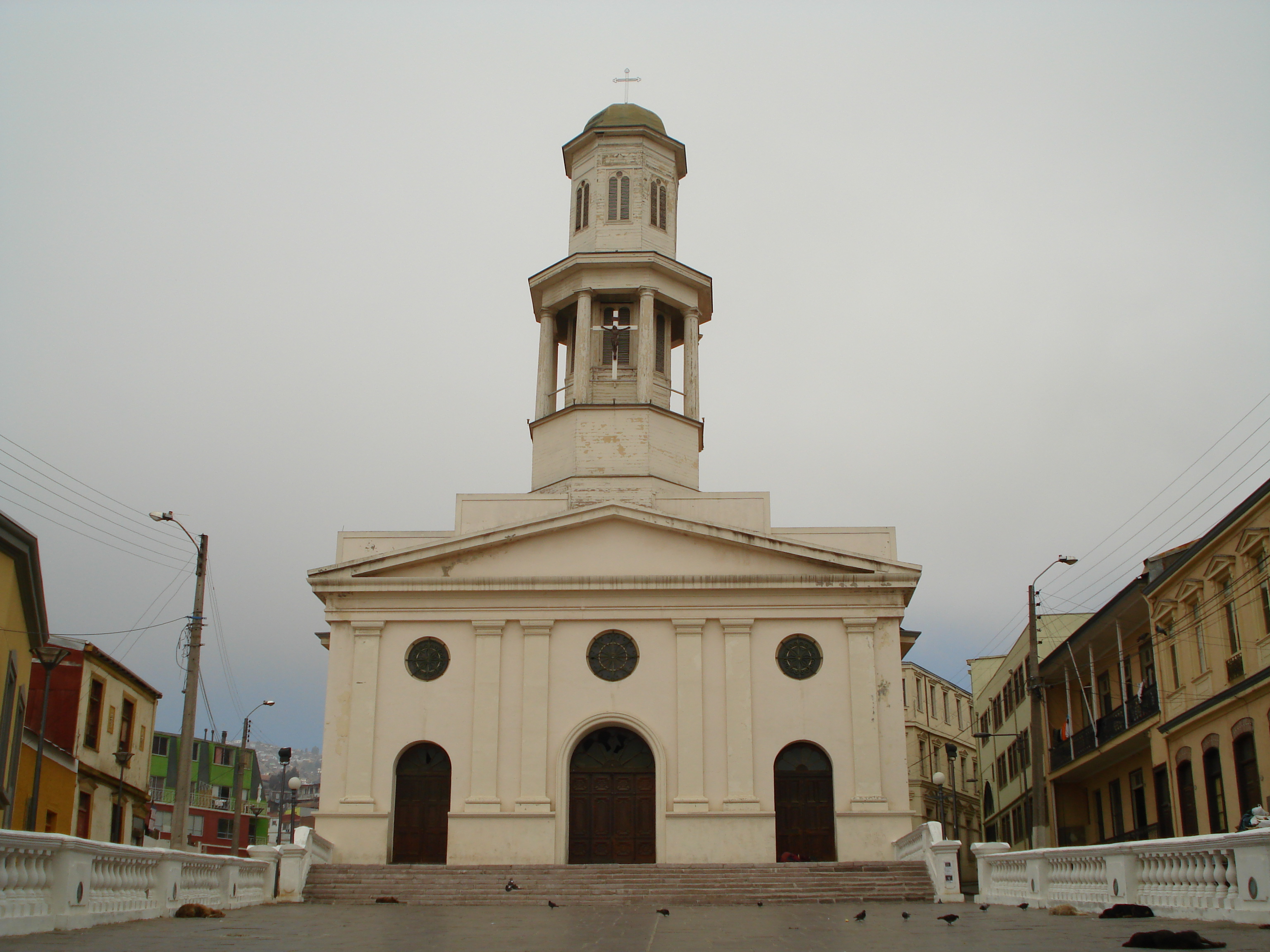
The Church of the Matrix, La Iglesia de la Matriz, located in Barrio Puerto

Barrio Puerto (English: the port neighborhood) is the area located between the Plaza Wheelright and Sotomayor Square in the downtown area of Valparaíso, Chile.

== History ==
Located in southern Valparaíso, the historic area is protected by the municipality and UNESCO. Two buildings within the area are the Mercado Puerto (English: Port Market), built in 1924, and Iglesia de la Matriz (English: Church of the Matrix). Mercado Puerto is located near the site where Juan de Saavedra landed in 1543, at what is now Plaza Echaurren. Between 2002, when the building was restored, and the 2010 Chile earthquake, the mercado was the site of several seafood restaurants. Near it and Plaza Wheelwright is the Iglesia de la Matriz, an adobe church, known for its octagonal steeple, that was built in 1837. It is the site of the first church built for the city in 1559. The king and queen of Spain donated a 17th-century Spanish carving of Christ in Agony to the church.

Plaza Wheelwright is named for William Wheelwright, an American who established a fleet of ships and railroads in Chile. A statue of him is located in the plaza. At the plaza, also called Plaza Aduana, is the custom house, Aduana, that was built in 1854 and 1855. The area also has hotels for sailors who visit the port.

== Renovation ==
There have been plans over the years to improve the crime-ridden area and restore the community, but as of 2014 there has not been much success and many of its residents and businesses have moved to other parts of the city. In 2015, Valparaíso Ciudad Creativa, innovadora y Sustentable (English: Valparaíso City Creative, Innovative and Sustainable) was implemented in 2016 as part of the Programa de Apoyo al Entorno Emprendedor de Corfo (English: Support Program for Entrepreneurial Environment of Corfo) to restore the historic patrimonial neighborhoods and encourage tourism. Residents of the Barrio Bustamante and Plaza Bustamante held a street festival with food and entertainment, following a week in which the facades of business and historic buildings were painted as part of the Barrio Puerto's renovations.

== Main sights ==
=== Muelle Prat ===
Muelle Prat (Prat Pier) is located in west side of Sotomayor Square, Valparaíso. It was established in the 1930s and all the port activity from Valparaiso can be found there.

A fender of about a kilometer long is seen projected towards the sea at one side of the pier, which serves as an anchorage point for big draft boats. Muelle Prat is a great place for tourism since boat trips are offered in order to tour the port as well as craftwork shops and restaurants. The large underground parking lot built under the Sotomayor Square makes it easier for visitors to get there and enjoy the attractions.

=== Navy Headquarters ===
The Comandancia de la Armada (Navy Headquarters) is located in Sotomayor Square. It was designed to serve as the headquarters of the Government of the Province of Valparaiso, residence of the intendent, a place of official receptions, and summer residence of the presidents of the Republic. This building was built in 1908–1910, on the same site that occupied the first Intendance, built at the beginning of the 19th century and demolished in 1900.

The work was designed and directed by the architect Ernesto Urquieta, who was inspired by the Paris city hall, applying forms and elements of the French Renaissance from the period of Louis XVI; the forms being noticed in the organization of the central body and in the accused stonework of the Zocalo, and the elements in the serene elegance of the lateral bodies. Because of its location and its unique presence, the Palace of the Former Intendance presides over the Sotomayor Square. Its façade presents a varied ornamentation of plaster and artificial stone characteristic of the Art Nouveau, highlighting a set of incoming and outgoing volumes and numerous bays that generate movement in the plane.

In the upper part there is a clock and a dome, and the windows of the third floor have balconies facing the Sotomayor Square. The central access to this palace consists of a large marble staircase with two small balustrades. The doors are protected by an iron lattice. During the first years this building was constituted in a center of great celebrations that congregated the high society. At present it is occupied by the Commander in Chief of the First Naval Zone.
