= Palace of Cerro Castillo =

- Palacio de Cerro Castillo
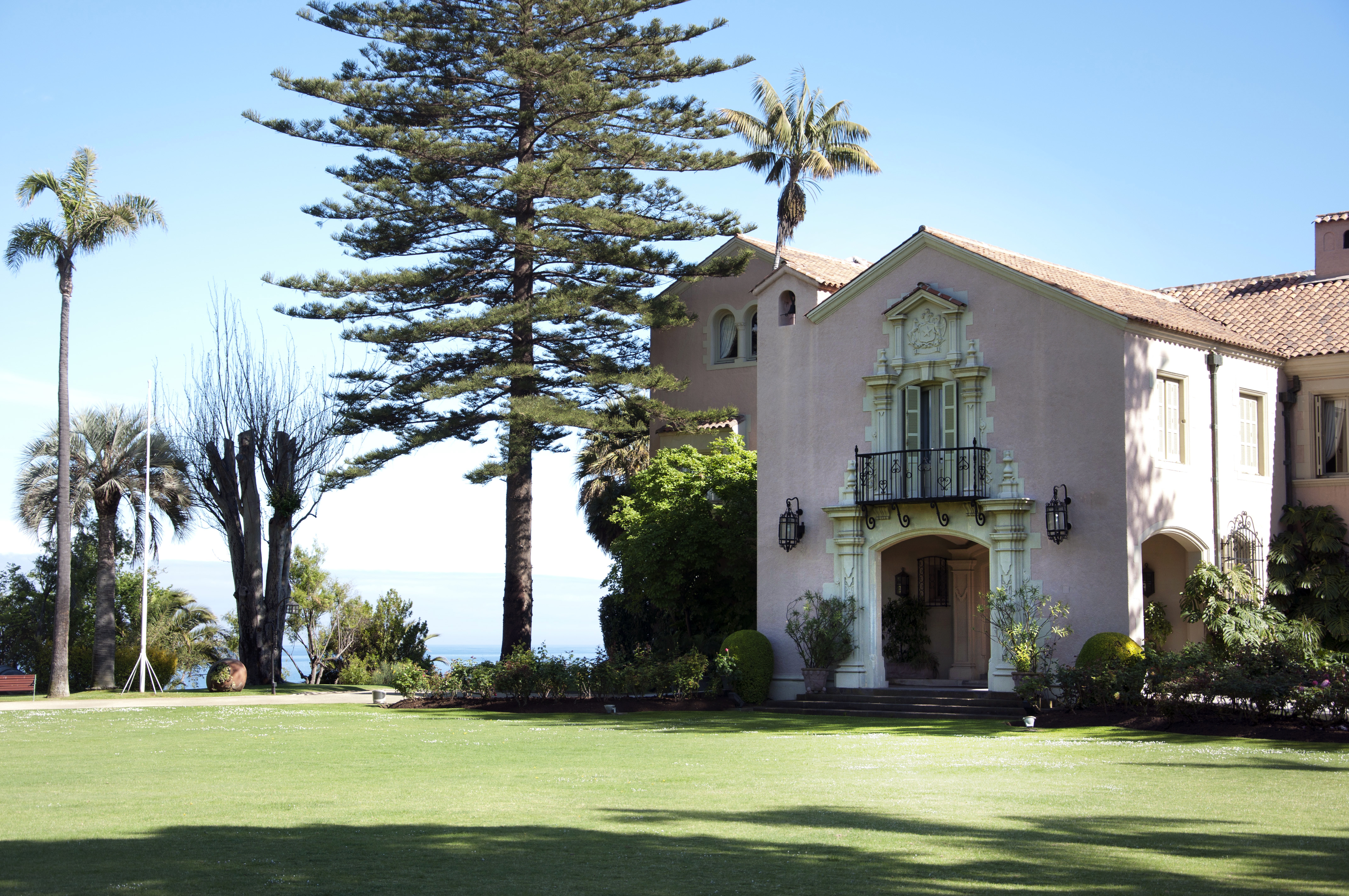
- Palace of Cerro Castillo pictured in 2011.

General information
- Type: official residence
- Architectural style: Spanish Colonial Revival
- Location: Chile
- Coordinates: 33.0200°S 71.5643°W
- Construction started: 1929
- Completed: 1930

The Palace of Cerro Castillo (Spanish: Palacio de Cerro Castillo) is the official country retreat and summer residence of the President of Chile. Built in 1929 in the Spanish Colonial Revival style, it is situated atop Cerro Castillo hill located in Viña del Mar and has been designated as a national and municipal historic monument.

== History ==
Constructed in 1929 during the presidency of Carlos Ibáñez del Campo, the Palace of Cerro Castillo was designed by Luis Browne and Manuel Valenzuela in the Spanish Colonial Revival style. The project engineer was Fortunato Castro. The palace was built on a hill whose land was attached to the nearby Callao Military Fort and occupancy of the new building began in 1930. Prior to its construction, the nearby Ex Intendencia served as the Chilean president's country and summer residence.

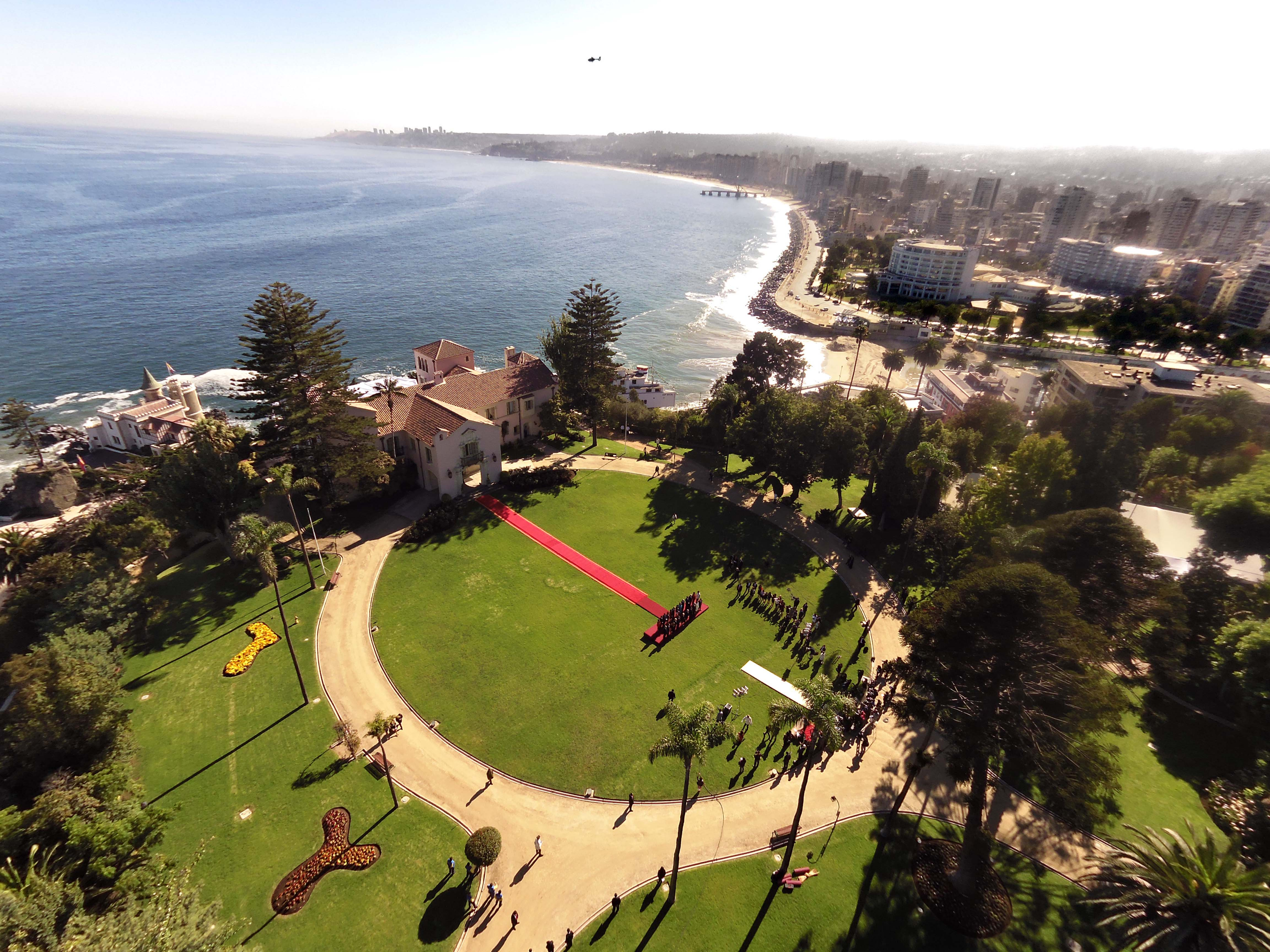
An aerial view of the Palace of Cerro Castillo, taken in 2014, showing its proximity to nearby Viña del Mar.

Traditionally, the incoming president of Chile spends the night before his or her inauguration in the palace and then returns to it afterwards to sit for a photo portrait with the newly installed cabinet.

Though Cerro Castillo was rarely used by dictator Augusto Pinochet, it did serve as the site of the wedding of Pinochet's son, Marco Antonio, and Soledad Olave.

The Palace of Cerro Castillo was declared an historic monument by the Viña del Mar municipal council in 2000 and a national historic monument in 2005.

== Design ==
The palace, which has 2,260 square metres (24,300 sq ft) of floor space, is constructed in three above-ground stories and a basement, which are connected by an internal elevator. It has eight bedrooms, plus other functional and living spaces.

During the administration of Eduardo Frei Ruiz-Tagle the palace's grounds were expanded and landscaped; they are currently open for public visiting.

== See also ==
- La Moneda - the seat of the President of the Republic of Chile in Santiago.
