= Edificio Armada de Chile =

National monument of Chile

Office of the Commander-in-Chief of the Chilean Navy
- Edificio de la Comandancia en Jefe de la Armada de Chile
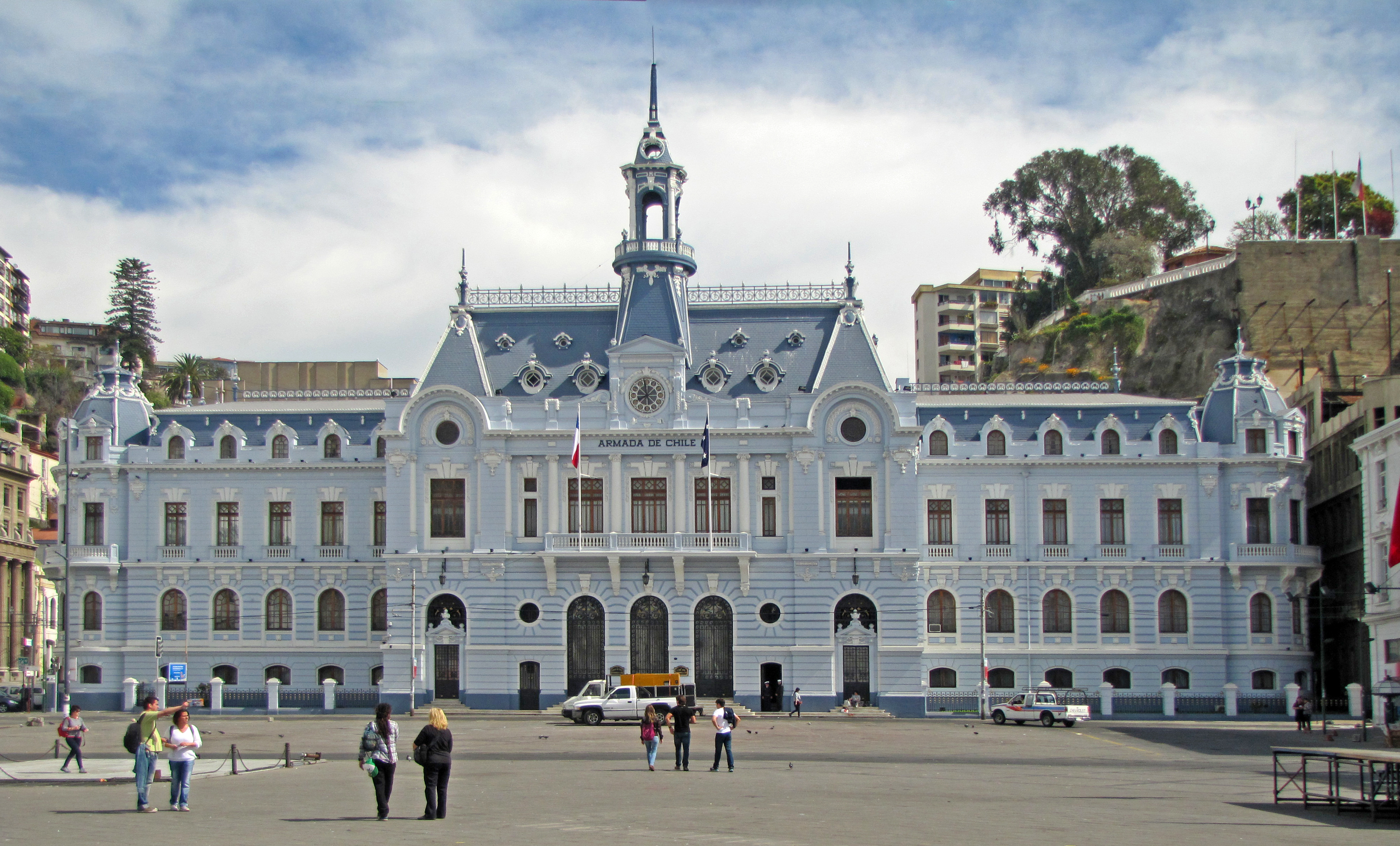
- Interactive map of the Office of the Commander-in-Chief of the Chilean Navy area

General information
- Coordinates: 33.0389°S 71.6295°W

Design and construction
- Architect: Ernesto Urquieta

The Edificio de la Comandancia en Jefe de la Armada de Chile, is a building in Valparaíso, Chile, which serves as the headquarters of the Chilean Navy. It is also known as Edificio de la Intendencia de Valparaíso because it was a purpose-built Intendencia, designed in an eclectic style with Renaissance Revival architecture elements, which rises 5 floors in height and covers 8,000 square metres (86,000 sq ft). The main facade of the building faces the Sotomayor Square and the Monument to the Heroes of Iquique.

The building has been the site of historical and social events, which were numerous and important. On January 23, 1979 it was declared a Historic Monument de Chile, at the same time both the Sotomayor Square and the surrounding buildings was declared a Zona Típica y de Protección.

== History ==
=== The former building (1831-1906) ===
In 1831, the architect Juan Stevenson designed a building to be constructed on the site of the current building, which was originally used as a custom house (Aduana de Valparaíso). The custom house moved to a new building inaugurated on September 1, 1855, and the former building went on to be occupied by the Intendencia.

The building began to have problems with the foundations in the late 19th century, caused by a series of earthquakes and winter floods, and as a result had to be demolished in 1900. The engineer Pedro Palma designed a rebuilding project, but it was not carried out, because the 1906 Valparaíso earthquake destroyed a great part of the city causing a change in the priorities of the government.

=== The new Intendencia de Valparaíso Building (1907-1973) ===
A year after the earthquake, architects were invited to participate in a competition to design a new building to be constructed on the same site, meeting the following requirements: serve as the headquarters for the Intendencia de Valparaíso and for the Gobernación Provincial, intendente's residence, serve as a venue for official receptions and as a summer residence for the presidents of Chile.

The winning design was done by architect Ernesto Urquieta, who had designed other important buildings in the city, including the main building for the Universidad Católica de Valparaíso, the Teatro Imperio and the Banco Franco-Belga. The design of Urquieta, which was inspired by French palace architecture like the Hôtel de Ville, Paris, consisted of a five-story building with offices for the Intendencia, Comandancia General de Armas, Dirección de Obras Públicas and the Tesorería Fiscal on the first to the third floor; and the residence for the intendente and the presidential apartment on the two highest floors.

The building was inaugurated in 1910, as part of the celebrations of the Centennial of Chile, to serve as the local seat of government. Since its opening, the building was the meeting place for the upper social class of the city. The parties that were held in the building, for celebrating historical events such as the 21 de mayo and the 18 de septiembre, were very famous. By 1914, masquerade balls were held inside its Salón de Invierno. According to the architect Tomás Eastman Montt, in the mid-1920s a ball was held in honor of Umberto I of Italy in the Salón Rojo of the building, while in the 1950s, the intendente Rivas Vicuña hosted a pompous masquerade ball, comparable with those hosted in 1914. The building served as a presidential residence until 1929, when the then president Carlos Ibáñez del Campo, during the Great Depression, ordered the construction of the Palacio Presidencial de Cerro Castillo in Viña del Mar.

In the 1960s, to celebrate a football championship won by the local team, Santiago Wanderers, the intendente Enrique Vicente hosted the first non-aristocratic great party in the building. The team players, the board of directors and some fans were invited to this party. Years later, under the presidency of Salvador Allende (1970-1973), the building was used for the summer months for presidential cabinet meetings and to receive to social leaders for an audience with the president. On November 30, 1971, during the state visit of Fidel Castro, he gave a speech from one of the balconies to a crowd of people on the Sotomayor Square.

=== Military dictatorship of Chile (1973–1990) ===
During the 1973 Chilean coup d'état, which marked the beginning of the dictadura militar led by general Augusto Pinochet, the Edificio de la Intendencia and other government buildings were seized by Navy sailors since early morning, many of whom had returned to the port of Valparaíso after having put to sea the previous day to take part of the UNITAS Operation conducted by the United States. The then intendente Luis Gutiérrez was surprised by the coup.

Shortly after, the building changed hands to the Comandancia en Jefe of the Primera Zona Naval de la Armada. Until then, the headquarters of the Comandancia en Jefe was located on Prat Street, and only the Guarnición Militar operated on the first floor of the building. On the other hand, the Intendencia was relocated in 1982 to a 19-story building built for that purpose, which is located nearby the Aníbal Pinto Square of Valparaíso, and adjacent to the Plaza de la Ciudadanía.

Under this new regime, some Navy sailors tortured people in the building. Among them was the journalist Hugo Maldonado, detained on October 4 in La Calera by his connection with sailors opposing the military coup. Maldonado was brought to the building by detectives, before being relocated to Silva Palma Quarters, where he was held prisoner for five years.

In 1979, based on a proposal by the National Tourism Service, the building was declared a Historic Monument, due to its historical and architectural value. Besides, the Sotomayor Square and the surrounding buildings were declared a Zona Típica (Heritage District).

=== Return to democracy until the present ===
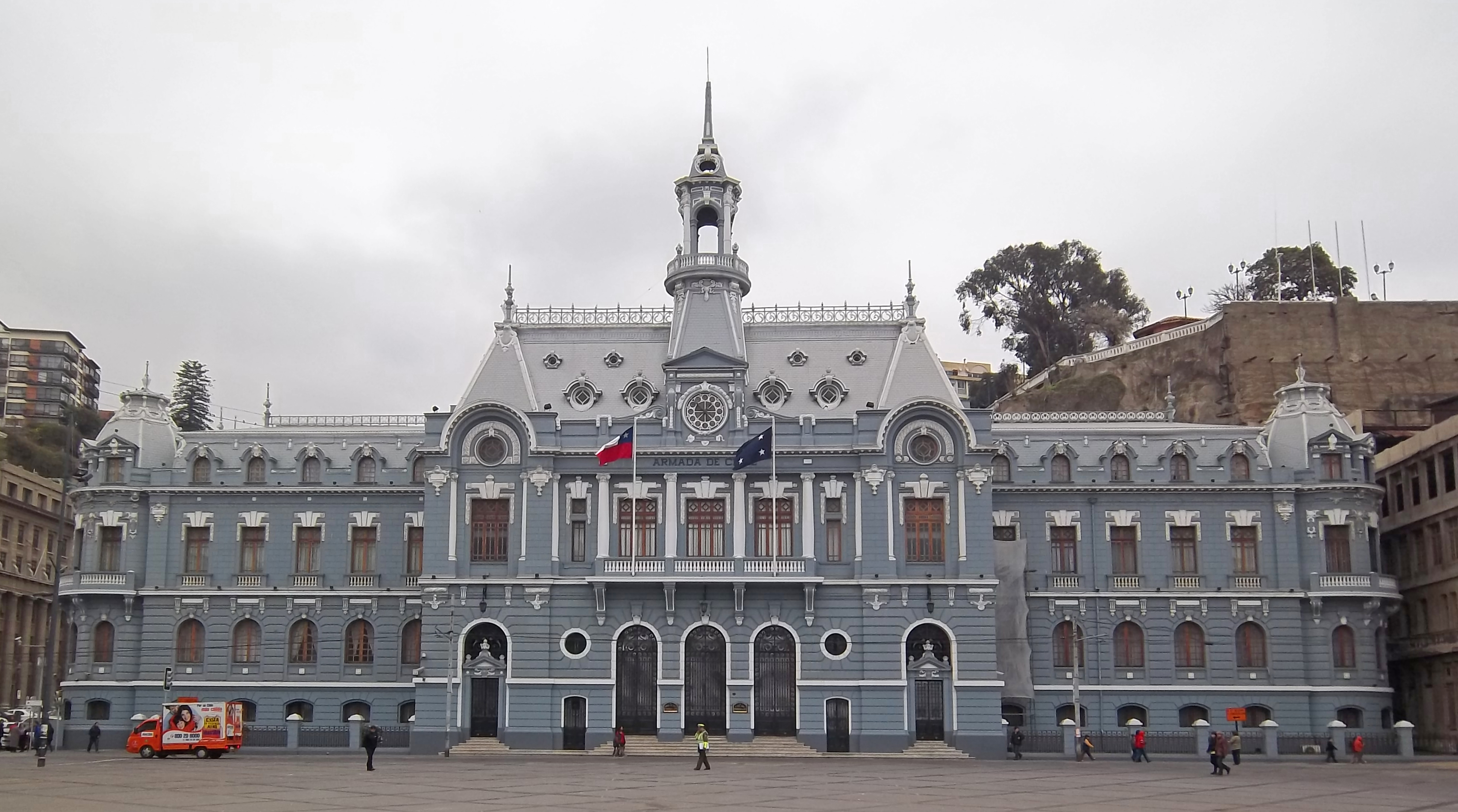
The main facade painted grey

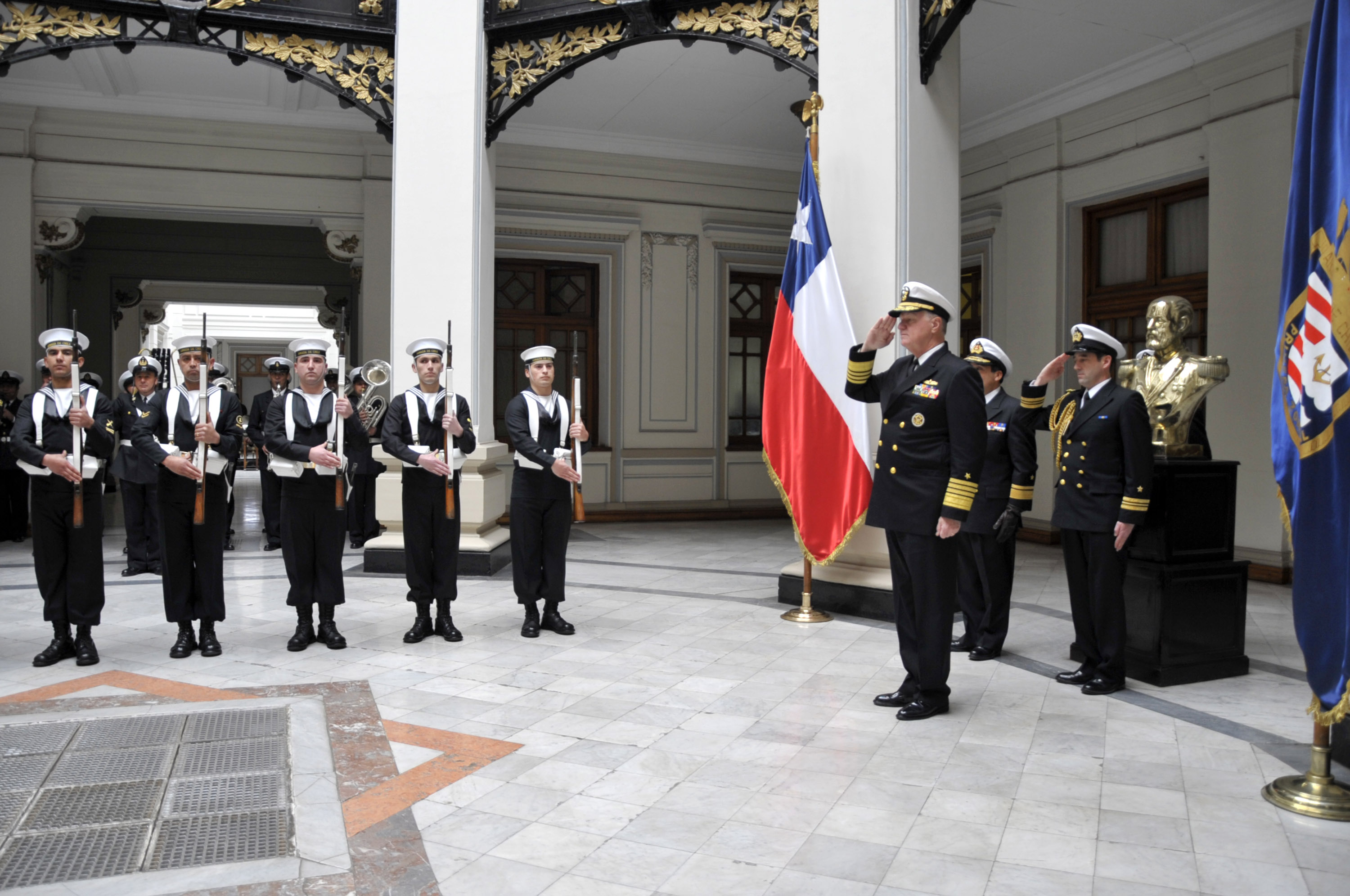
Ceremony of the Armada in the interior of the building, in 2011.

Following the Chilean transition to democracy, the building remained under the control of the Chilean Navy and housing the Comandancia en Jefe de la Primera Zona Naval, the Guarnición Militar de Valparaíso and the Cantón de Reclutamiento 23. Even if there have appeared opinions in favor of returning the building to its original use as seat of local politics, as of 2008 neither the Intendencia nor other authorities have asked for transferring the possession of the building.

In 2013, the Centro de Estudios Patrimoniales of the Pontificia Universidad Católica de Valparaíso, commissioned by the Armada de Chile and with the support of the Consejo de Monumentos Nacionales and the municipality of Valparaíso, restored the facade of the building. The exterior of the building was completely painted over. The then grey building was painted blue, similar to its original color. Also was installed a LED lighting system for highlighting the building at the night.

Since it was opened until now, the building have been used to host official foreign visits. Like example, in 2016 Prince Edward, Earl of Wessex was received with honors.

== Description ==
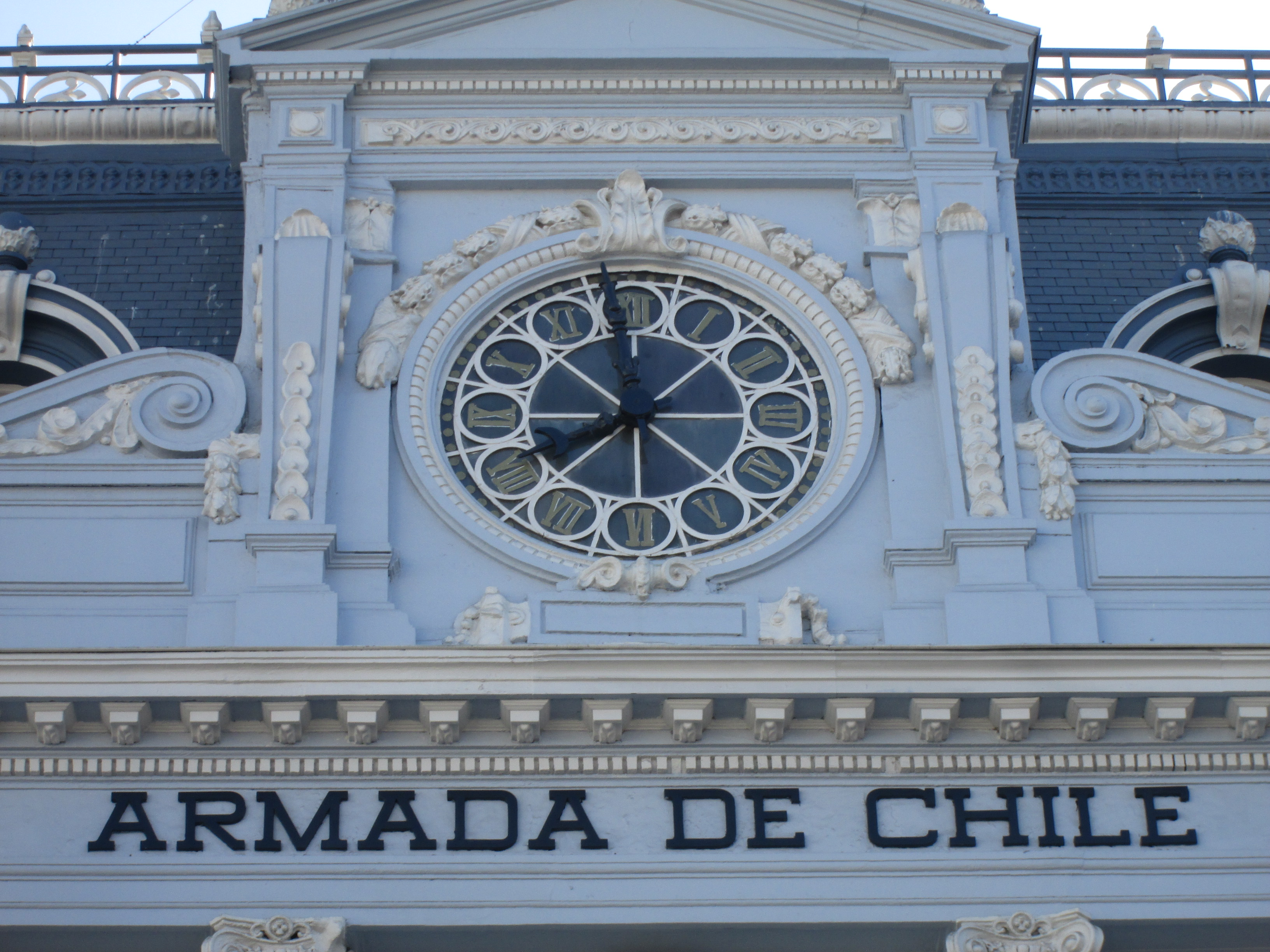
Facade clock detail.

The design of the building is eclectic and is based on the French Renaissance Revival style used in the construction of palaces like the Hôtel de Ville, Paris. The design also includes Louis XVI style elements. The building is five floors high and features a slightly protruding central wing and two side wings, containing many rooms and halls. The three lower floors were designed to house offices, while other two floors are for being used as official residences. The halls of the central portion of the building have been used for receptions, conferences and official meetings, as well as to receive dignitaries and famous visitors.

The main facade of the building features recessed and projecting bays, as well as ornamental plaster and cast stone. The structure is crowned by a mansard roof that overlooks the Sotomayor Square, and its center wing contains a facade clock that is topped by a cupola. The building was originally blue in color like its present color. In the early 1970s, it had a pastel-colored appearance, and during the dictadura militar the building was painted gray.

The interior of the building has well-preserved light fixture like almost all of its fine furniture, which was made in 1884 by Leroux from Paris. A marble stair leads from the center entrance to the second floor. A skylight rises from the second floor, supported by columns decorated with relief sculptures.
