= 1906 Swansea earthquake =

Earthquake in Wales on 27 June 1906

- Location within the United Kingdom
- UTC time: 1906-06-27 09:45
- ISC event: n/a
- USGS-ANSS: n/a
- Local date: 27 June 1906
- Local time: 09:45
- Magnitude: 5.2 M_{L}
- Epicentre: 51.62°N 3.81°W
- Type: Unknown
- Areas affected: England; Wales
- Max. intensity: MSK-64 VII (Very strong)
- Casualties: Three injured

The 1906 Swansea earthquake hit near the town of Swansea, Glamorgan, Wales on 27 June. It was one of the most damaging to hit Britain during the twentieth century, with a small area reaching an intensity of VII on the Medvedev–Sponheuer–Karnik scale.

== Location, date and time ==
At 9.45am on 27 June 1906, a powerful earth tremor was felt across much of South Wales, its epicentre being placed just offshore of Port Talbot. The quake, which struck just a few weeks after the devastating 1906 San Francisco earthquake, was felt as far afield as Ilfracombe, Birmingham and southwest Ireland.

== Cause ==
Swansea is located near the southwestern ends of two major fault structures; the Neath Disturbance and the Swansea Valley Disturbance, movement on either of which or on any of several adjoining faults may have caused the quake.

== Magnitude ==
The magnitude of the earthquake was measured at 5.2 on the Richter scale.

== Impact ==
The earthquake was felt by many people, though recorded injuries were minimal: a young man, Thomas Westbury, and a three-year-old boy, Thomas Lewis, were hit by falling bricks and a girl was injured by the toppling of tin plates at Cwmavon. Reports told of bricks falling from chimneys across the city and the Mumbles lighthouse "rocked on its foundations."

== See also ==
- List of earthquakes in 1906
- List of earthquakes in the British Isles
