= 1906 Manasi earthquake =

Earthquake in China

- Location within China
- UTC time: 1906-12-22 18:21:11
- ISC event
- USGS-ANSS: ComCat
- Local date: December 23, 1906
- Magnitude: M_{w} 8.0–8.3
- Depth: 20 km
- Epicenter: 44.284°N 85.572°E
- Type: Blind thrust
- Max. intensity: MMI X (Extreme)
- Casualties: 280+ dead

The 1906 Manasi earthquake (玛纳斯地震), also known as the Manas earthquake occurred in the morning of December 23, 1906, at 02:21 UTC+8:00 local time or December 22, 18:21 UTC. It measured 8.0–8.3 on the moment magnitude scale and 8.3 on the surface-wave magnitude scale. The epicenter of this earthquake is located in Manas County, Xinjiang, China. An estimated 280–300 people died and another 1,000 more were injured by the earthquake.

== Tectonic setting ==
The Tien Shan mountains in Central Asia formed as a result of thrusting and folding of the continental crust during the Late Cenozoic era. Around this time, the Indian subcontinent is colliding with Asia along a 2,500 km long convergent boundary known as the Main Himalayan Thrust. The ongoing collision of India into the Eurasian plate has resulted in extreme internal deformation of the continental crust. Deformation has induced large-scale intraplate shear and thrust faulting far from the plate boundary. Thrusting along the Tien Shan mountains has shortened the crust by an average velocity of 13 ± 7 mm/yr. In some areas such as the Western Tien Shan, the shortening rate is as high as 23 mm/yr, however in the northern region, that rate is much slower at just 6 mm/yr.

== Earthquake ==
The earthquake occurred as a result of thrust faulting within the fold and thrust belt beneath the northern flanks of the Tien Shan range. Specifically, it occurred on the Southern Junggar Thrust, a 45° south-dipping thrust fault that becomes a detachment fault, and later a steep reverse structure as it dips further beneath the Borohoro Mountains, a subrange of the Tien Shan. The fault is part of the Huoerguosi-Manas-Tugulu fold and thrust belt, and breaches the surface with three segments, laterally offset by 5 to 10 km. Modern interpretation of the rupture believes it broke all three segments of the fault. Research suggests that the Manasi earthquake had a 150 km by 75 km rupture area and an average fault slip of 3.5 ± 2 meters at depth. This would correspond to a moment magnitude in the range 7.8–8.3, the most plausible magnitude for the event. The International Seismological Centre updated its catalog and placed the magnitude of the earthquake at 8.0. The earthquake's focal depth is not well known due to the lack of local seismic instrumentation at the time; values from Chinese earthquake catalogs give a range from 12 to 30 km depth. An analysis of focal depths for other earthquakes in the area published in 2004 obtained an average figure of 20 km, therefore the 1906 earthquake likely nucleated at this depth. The same research also proposed that the earthquake rupture initiated on the steep reverse fault and later onto the detachment.

Paleoseismology has revealed that very few earthquakes on the scale of the 1906 event has occurred in the past. The average recurrence interval for large earthquakes is estimated at 5,000–6,000 years.

The deep blind reverse fault responsible for the rupture triggered small surface scarps with heights 0.2–0.5 meters to form at the surface. These surface breaks are associated with the Huoerguosi-Manas-Tugulu fold and anticline zone. During the deep earthquake rupture process, then fold and anticline zone began picking up motions, resulting in a surface rupture. In addition to the surface scarps, zones of uplift and folding were also observed 45 km away from the epicenter.

== Impact ==
The earthquake had a maximum intensity of X (Extreme) on the Mercalli intensity scale. In the villages of Shizijie, Bajiahu, Niujuanzi, Zhuanglangmiao, Xidatang, Shichang, in Boluotonggu, and the mountain areas around Dazimiao and Reshuiquanzi, many wood and mud houses collapsed while those that remained intact were tilted. More than 2,000 homes were destroyed, resulting in over 280 people killed. Many temples were also completely destroyed. Surface fissures tore through the ground, ranging from 0.2 meter to one meter in width, and up to several kilometers long. The earthquake also triggered landslides and opened wide cracks near the mountains. The earthquake also caused slumping channel banks some 5–15 km long.

In Shawan County, an estimated 30% of all residential infrastructures collapsed but there were no fatalities. The nearby city of Changji reported some damage to its temples during the shaking. In Wusu, many homes constructed of mud and wooden beams also collapsed. The walls of some old homes cracked as a result.

== See also ==
- List of earthquakes in 1906
- List of earthquakes in China
