= Robert de Montessus de Ballore =

French mathematician (1870–1937)

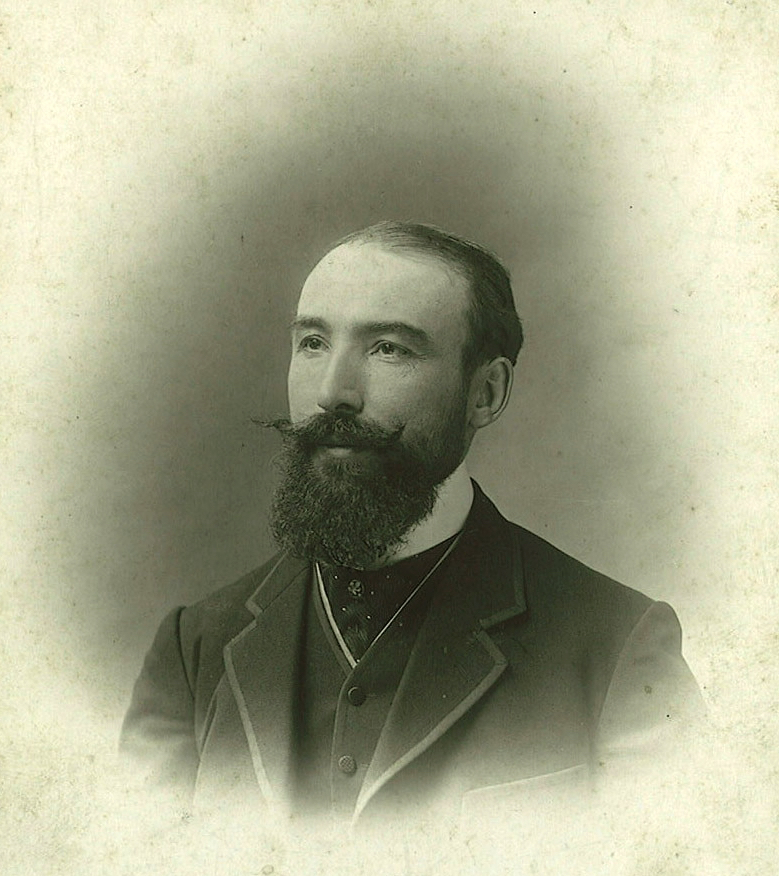
- Robert de Montessus de Ballore in 1914
- Born: 20 May 1870; Villeurbanne, France
- Died: 26 January 1937 (aged 66); Arcachon, France
- Citizenship: France
- Scientific career
- Fields: Mathematics
- Thesis: Sur les fractions continues algébriques (1905)

Robert Fernand Bernard, Viscount de Montessus de Ballore (20 May 1870, in Villeurbanne – 26 January 1937, in Arcachon) was a French mathematician, known for his work on continued fractions and Padé approximants.

== Biography ==
Robert de Montessus was a viscount, born to a noble family originating in the Ancien Régime.

His father Philippe-Georges de Montessus de Ballore (1825–1890) was an officer who was trained at Saint Cyr and then resigned from the army to manage a farm in Charolais.

Robert had three brothers:

- Fernand de Montessus de Ballore (1851–1923), graduate of l'École polytechnique, seismologist and the first director of the Seismological Service of Chile;
- Jean (1852–1903), a magistrate;
- Henri (1862–1918), professor of physics at Grenoble.

In 1886, Robert obtained his bachelor of science degree. From 1887 to 1889, he attended preparatory classes at l'École des mines de Saint-Étienne. On 8 May 1905, at the Sorbonne, he successfully defended his thesis on continued fractions, written under the supervision of Paul Appell.

On 29 March 1906, he married Suzanne Montaudon (1884–1983). Their marriage produced four children: Simone (1907–?), Jacques (1909–2003), André (1912–1978) and Geneviève (deceased at birth in 1916).

Robert de Montessus was an editor of the Journal de mathématiques pures et appliquées and the author of numerous mathematical publications. He was a member of the Société mathématique de France and a member of the Société des arts, sciences, belles-lettres et d'agriculture de l'Académie de Mâcon.

== Selected publications ==
- Sur les fractions continues algébriques, A. Hermann, Paris, 1905
- Leçons élémentaires sur le calcul des probabilités, Gauthier-Villars, Paris. 1908; online text at IRIS
- with Robert d'Adhémar: Calcul numérique, O. Doins et fils, Paris, 1911.
- Exercices et leçons de mécanique analytique, Gauther-Villars, Paris, 1915.
- Leçons sur les fonctions elliptiques en vue de leurs applications, Gauthier-Villars, Paris, 1917.
