= 1906 Meishan earthquake =

Earthquake affecting Taiwan

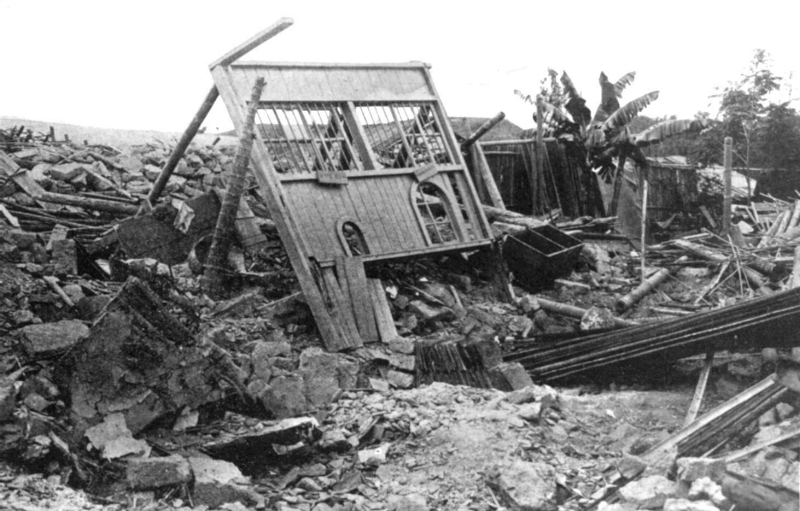

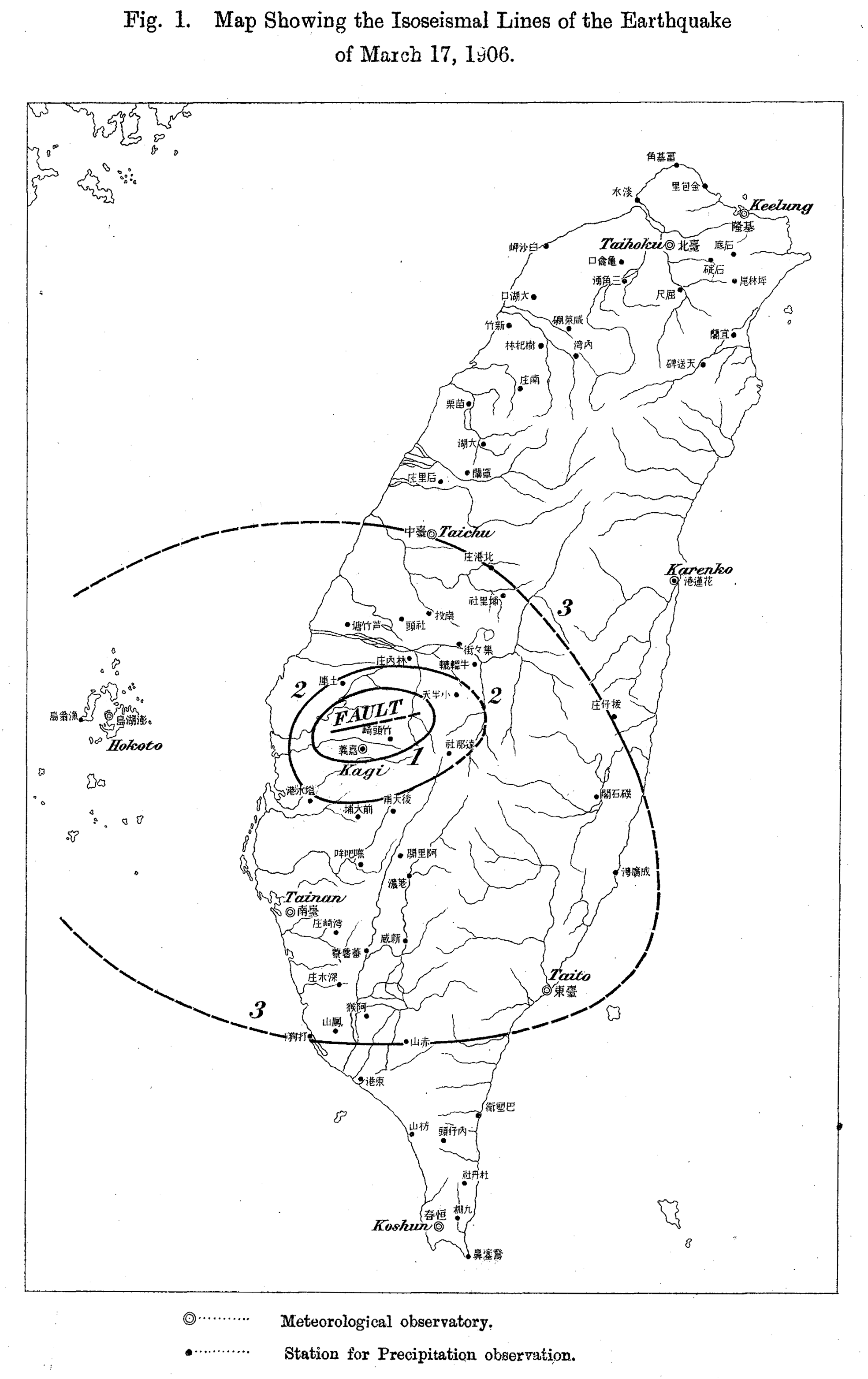
- UTC time: 1906-03-16 10:43
- ISC event: 16957889
- USGS-ANSS: ComCat
- Local date: March 17, 1906
- Local time: 06:43
- Magnitude: 6.8 M_{s}^{(Utsu)}
- Depth: 6 km (3.7 mi)
- Epicenter: 23.55°N 120.45°E
- Areas affected: Japanese Taiwan
- Max. intensity: MMI IX (Violent)
- Casualties: 1,258–1,266 dead 2,385– 2,476 injured

The 1906 Meishan earthquake (Chinese: 1906年梅山地震; pinyin: 1906 nián Měishān Dìzhèn) was centered on Moe'akhe (Chinese: 梅仔坑; Pe̍h-ōe-jī: Môe-á-kheⁿ), Kagi-cho, Japanese Taiwan (modern-day Meishan, Chiayi County, Taiwan) and occurred on March 17. Referred to at the time as the Great Kagi earthquake (Chinese: 嘉義大地震; pinyin: Jiāyì Dà Dìzhèn), it is the third-deadliest earthquake in Taiwan's recorded history, claiming around 1,260 lives. The shock had a surface-wave magnitude of 6.8 and a Mercalli intensity of IX (Violent).

== Earthquake ==
The earthquake struck at 06:43 local time on 17 March 1906, at a focal depth of 6 kilometres (3.7 mi). The event created the Meishan fault, a fault with a length of 25 kilometres (15.5 mi) stretching through modern-day Chiayi County. Aftershocks continued throughout the day, hampering rescue efforts.

== Damage ==
Reports vary slightly, but according to the official Central Weather Bureau summary, the casualties and damage were as follows:

- Deaths: 1,258
- Injuries: 2,385
- Houses destroyed: 6,769
- Houses damaged: 14,218

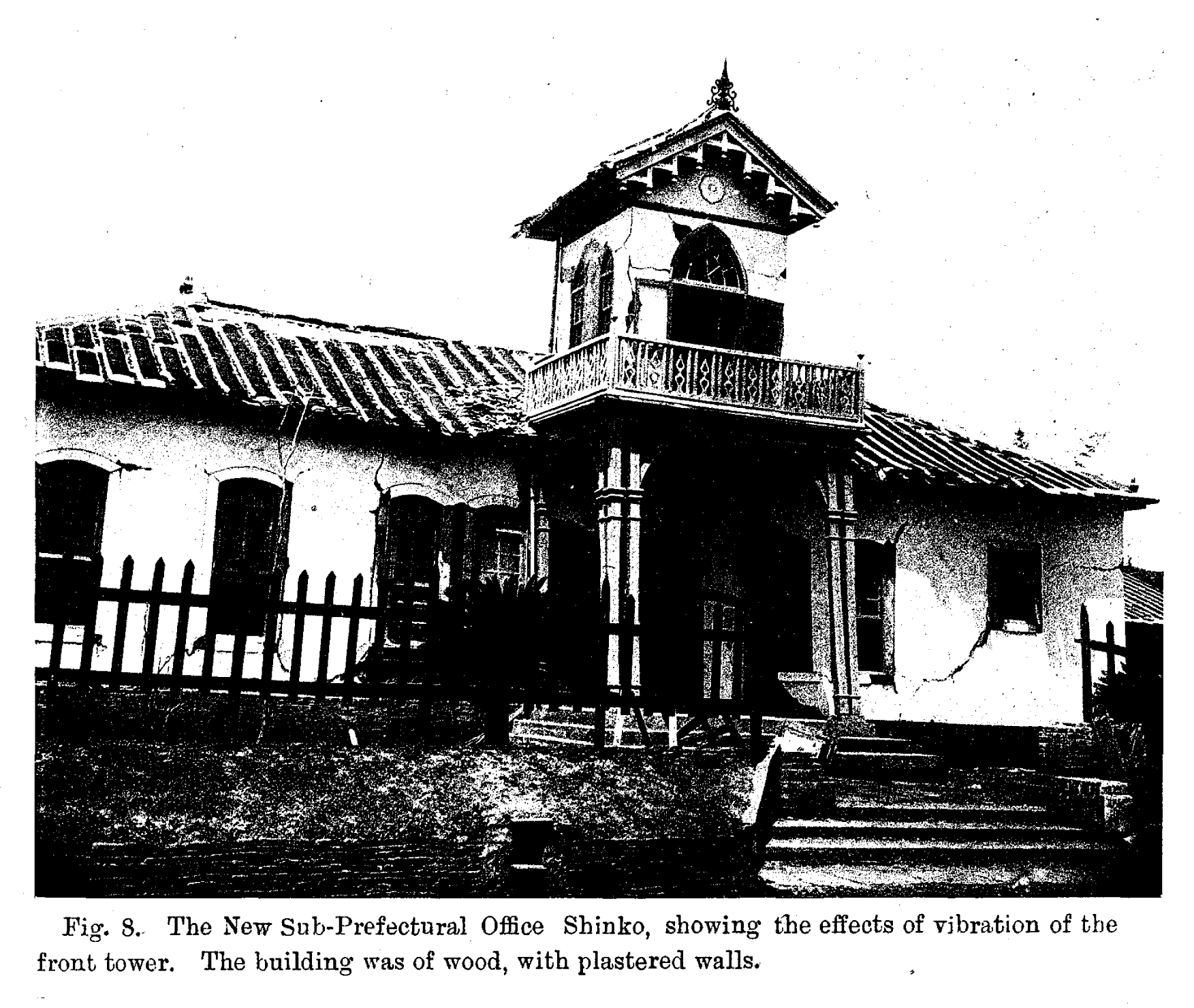
Damage at a Japanese colonial office

Fusakichi Omori, a pioneering seismologist from Japan who arrived shortly after the earthquake believed that the high number of casualties was due to the construction of the local houses. Loosely cemented with mud, the combination of sun-dried mud brick walls and heavy roofing beams was thought to be responsible for many dwellings collapsing, killing or injuring the inhabitants. He also found evidence of soil liquefaction, and stated that the town of Bishō (Meishan) had been completely destroyed by the quake.

Omori's figures give slightly different casualty rates, and very different statistics for building damage:

- Deaths: 1,266
- Injuries: 2,476
- Houses destroyed: 7,284
- Houses damaged: 30,021

== Reaction ==
The veteran missionary William Campbell wrote:

I was there soon after, and had a profound feeling of sadness on seeing whole streets covered with fallen beams and other debris; on seeing, too, so many traces of the awful suffering on every side. Within Ka-gi city, and a limited area around, 1,216 persons were suddenly thrust out into the eternal world. Not fewer than 2,306 persons were seriously injured, and 13,259 houses laid low. The great mysterious Power then tore the earth into deep, open chasms in several places.

The Japanese colonial authorities in Taihoku (Taipei) sent teams of medical personnel to assist, and Campbell reported that shortly after the earthquake reconstruction efforts were well advanced. At the time some writers suggested a link between the Meishan quake and the great 1906 San Francisco earthquake, which occurred a month later, while some religious groups linked it not only with the San Francisco disaster, but also an earlier earthquake in Cambria, Italy and other natural disasters as a sign of the end-times.

== See also ==
- List of earthquakes in 1906
- List of earthquakes in Taiwan
- 2016 southern Taiwan earthquake
- 2025 Tainan–Chiayi earthquake
