= 1906 Valparaíso earthquake =

8.2 Mw earthquake in Chile

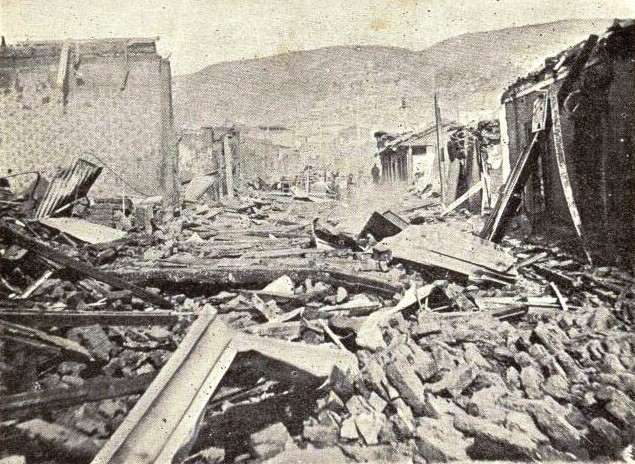
- Damage in Valparaíso after the earthquake

- USGS ShakeMap

- Location within Chile
- UTC time: 1906-08-17 00:40:04
- ISC event: 16957911
- USGS-ANSS: ComCat
- Local date: 19:55, August 16, 1906 (−04:00)
- Local time: 19:55
- Magnitude: 8.2 M_{w}
- Depth: 25 km (16 mi)
- Epicenter: 32°24′S 71°24′W
- Areas affected: Chile
- Max. intensity: MMI XI (Extreme)
- Tsunami: Yes
- Casualties: 3,882 dead

The 1906 Valparaíso earthquake occurred on August 16 at 19:55 local time. Its epicenter was offshore of the Valparaíso Region of Chile, and its magnitude was estimated at 8.2 M_{w}. This earthquake occurred thirty minutes after an 8.35 M_{w} earthquake near the Aleutian Islands, Alaska.

Much of Valparaíso was destroyed; there was severe damage in Central Chile from Illapel to Talca. The earthquake was felt from Tacna to Puerto Montt. Reports said the earthquake lasted four minutes. A tsunami was also generated. The earthquake killed a reported 3,882 people.

The record of previous seismic activity includes major earthquakes in 1647, 1730 and 1822. The 1906 disaster was predicted by Captain Arturo Middleton, Chief of the Chilean Army Meteorological Office, in a letter that was published in El Mercurio, one week before it occurred.

Admiral Luis Gómez Carreño ordered the shooting of at least 15 people, who were caught looting after the earthquake. A Board for Reconstruction was formed some weeks after the earthquake. The Seismological Service of Chile was also created.

== Background ==
Chile lies above a convergent plate boundary, an area where the Nazca plate under the Pacific Ocean is subducted or moved beneath the South American plate. In the region around Valparaiso, the rate of convergence is about 70 mm/yr. As these two plates converge, it drives the Nazca plate with massive movements called megathrust earthquakes. The 1906 event was one of many large earthquakes in Chile along this plate boundary. Earthquakes can originate at the plate interface itself or within either the subducting or overriding plates.

Citing the conjunction of Neptune with the moon, Captain Arturo Middleton, Chief of the Chilean Army's Meteorological Office, predicted the earthquake in a letter published in the Valparaíso newspaper El Mercurio on August 6. Captain Middleton was severely criticized in the following days, and was described as "ignorant and obscurantist."

== Earthquake characteristics ==
On August 16, 1906, at 19:55 local time, while most Chileans were dining, a subterraneous sound was heard, and before it ended, the first tremor occurred, lasting about four minutes. The second tremor occurred at 20:06 and, although it lasted only two minutes, was much more violent. There were numerous aftershocks: at least 56 of them occurred during the first 24 hours after the beginning tremors.

The magnitude of the earthquake has been estimated to be 8.4 M_{L}, 8.2 M_{w} or M_{s} 8.2–8.3. The energy release has been re-evaluated with an estimated seismic moment of 2.8 × 10^{28}, equivalent to a magnitude of 8.26 M_{w}. The rupture length of the earthquake has been estimated at 200 km with a focal depth of about 40 km. The focal mechanism has been assessed using contemporary seismograph records from five stations, which were published soon after the earthquake. The data suggest that the earthquake was probably along the subduction interface. Modelling of a tsunami using these source parameters shows that this earthquake was the origin of the transpacific tsunamis recorded that same day in Hawaii and Japan, rather than the almost contemporaneous 1906 Aleutian Islands earthquake.

The 30-minute time gap between the Aleutian and Chilean earthquakes is thought to be coincidental, with no causal link between the two.

== Damage ==
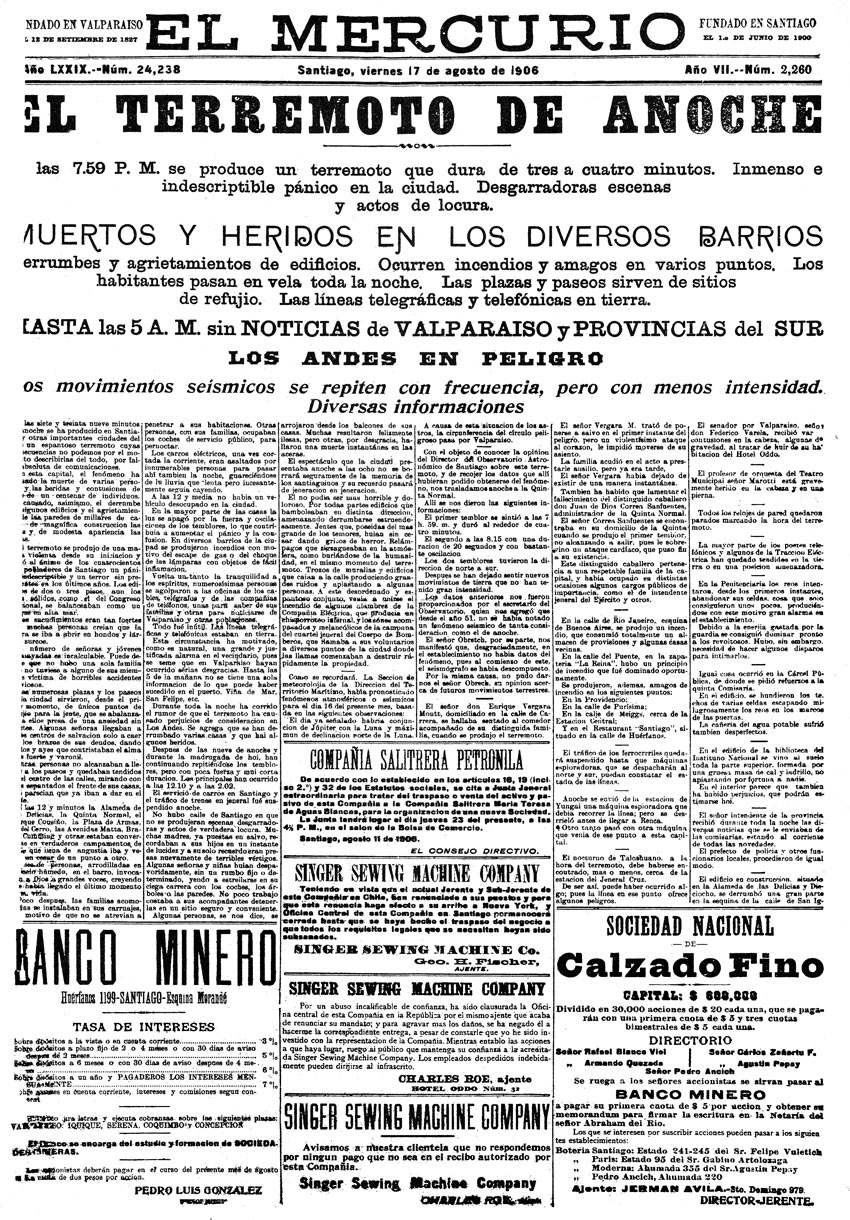
El Mercurio newspaper on August 17, 1906, reporting the earthquake of the day before

The earthquake caused damage throughout Central Chile, from Illapel to Talca. There were several destructive fires in El Almendral (from Plaza de la Victoria to Cerro Barón), Mercado Cardonal, Teatro de la Victoria (Victory Theatre), the Intendencia, the Maritime Government in Sotomayor Square and the Fiscal Dock at the port.

The earthquake was also felt in Santiago, the capital of Chile and all the way to Brazil. The newspaper El Mercurio reported in its August 17 edition that "the earthquake was produced in a violent way since its beginning, and provoked an indescribable panic through all the four thousands of inhabitants of Santiago and an unprecedented terror in the last years. Two or three-story buildings, even the most solid ones such as the National Congress, were swinging like a vessel in the sea. The shakings were so strong that many people thought the earth was going to open itself in deep and long strips."

According to the University of Chile, there were 3,882 deaths. The earthquake left more than 20,000 injured.

On August 19, Admiral Luis Gómez Carreño was appointed Plaza Port Chief. Gómez ordered the distribution of water and food, removal of corpses and demolition of buildings in risk of collapse, from a tent in Plaza de La Victoria. Adm. Gómez ordered the shooting of at least 15 people who had committed crimes during the aftermath. Others received public lashings for warning about another disaster or attacking the police.

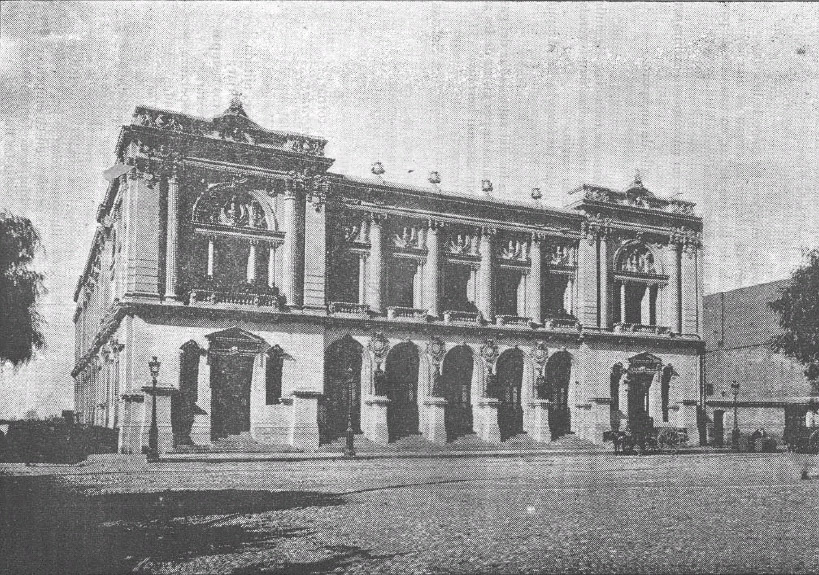
Teatro de la Victoria before the earthquake

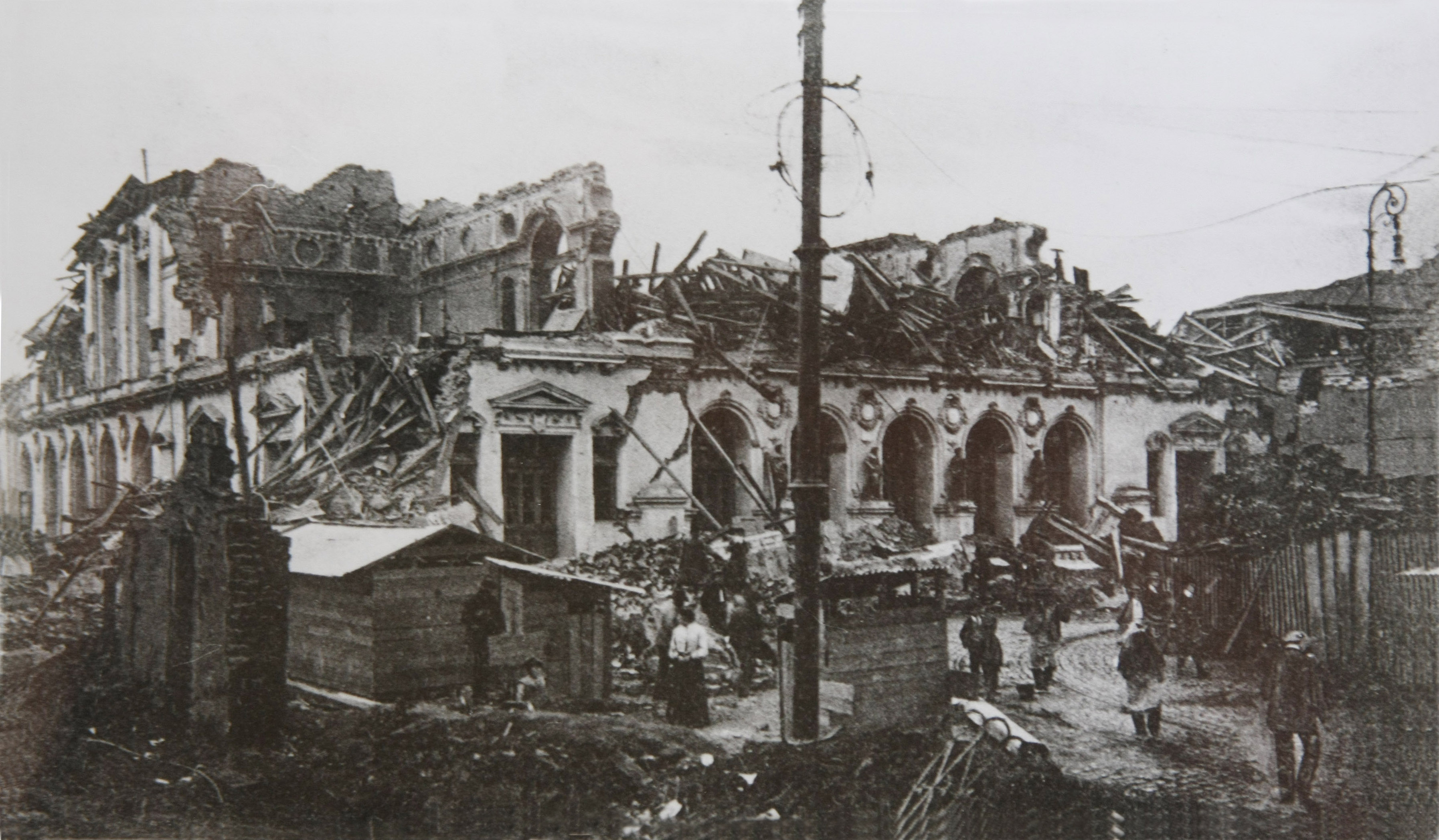
Teatro de la Victoria after the earthquake

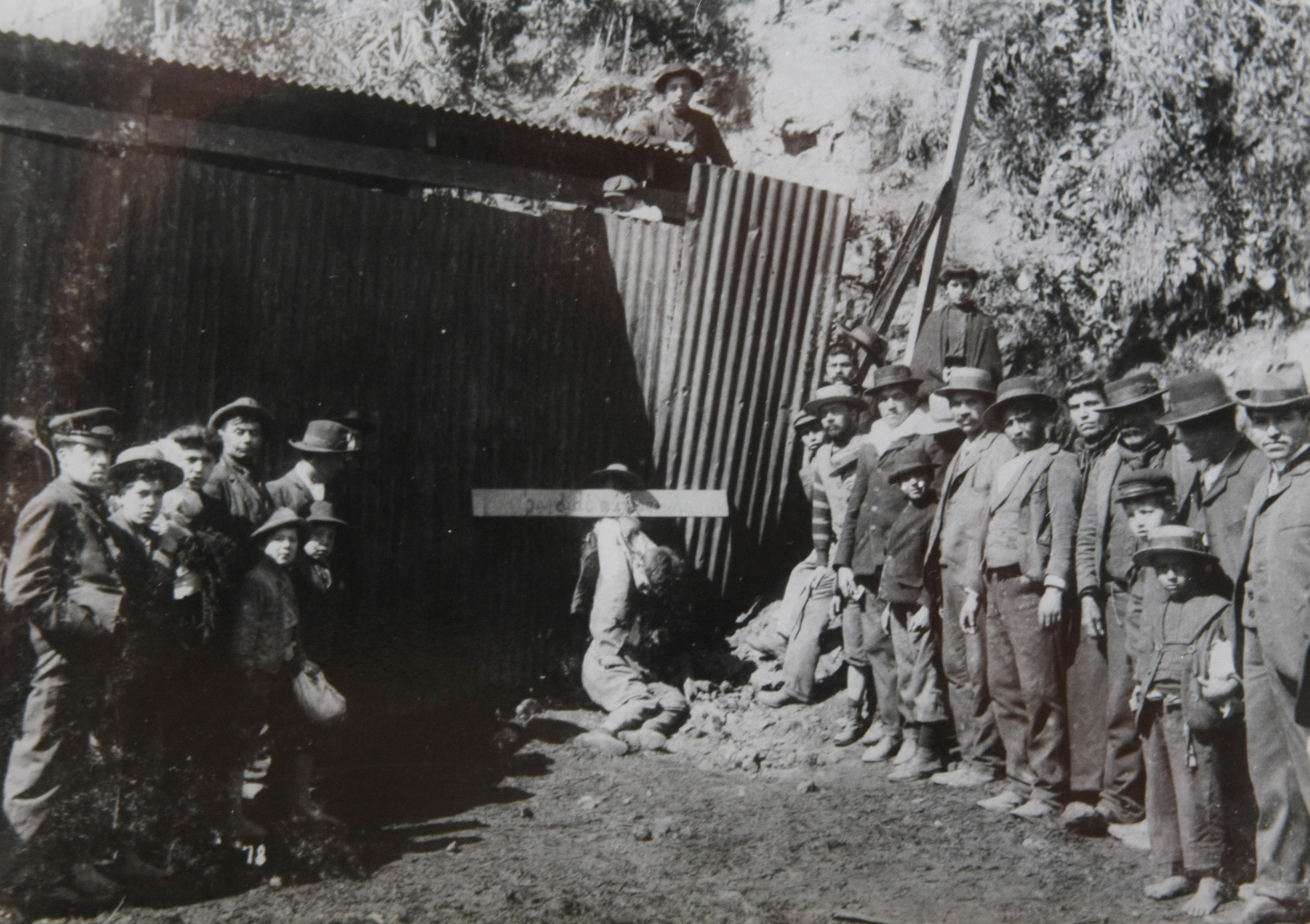
Looters shot by the authorities.

== Relief efforts ==
Despite the state of the city, authorities quickly organized themselves into relief groups. Firefighters from other cities of Chile, including Santiago, Concepción and Talcahuano, moved to Valparaíso to help the local Fire Bureau. Physician José Grossi worked to counteract the plagues that followed the earthquake.

On August 25, President Germán Riesco and President-Elect Pedro Montt arrived at Valparaíso. They arrived there by train, on foot, or horseback to survey the magnitude of the disaster.

Working class organizations—mutual aid societies, labor unions, and Left organizations—held fundraisers to financially support those they thought were left behind or forgotten by state efforts. Some organizations in Santiago sent money to labor groups in Valparaíso; they also helped to temporarily house working class victims from Valparaíso in Santiago.

Some weeks after the earthquake, a Board for Reconstruction was formed, using money received from other countries.

== Aftermath ==
In 1906, the Seismological Service of Chile (Servicio Sismológico de Chile) was created. Its first chief executive was Fernand de Montessus de Ballore.

The effects of this historic seismic event in the Valparaíso rupture zone would be studied and measurable in the context of further seismic activity in this vicinity.

== See also ==
- List of earthquakes in 1906
- List of earthquakes in Chile
- Seismicity of the Chilean coast
