= Sotomayor Square =

Square in Valparaíso, Chile

Coordinates: 33°2′18.48″S 71°37′43.56″W

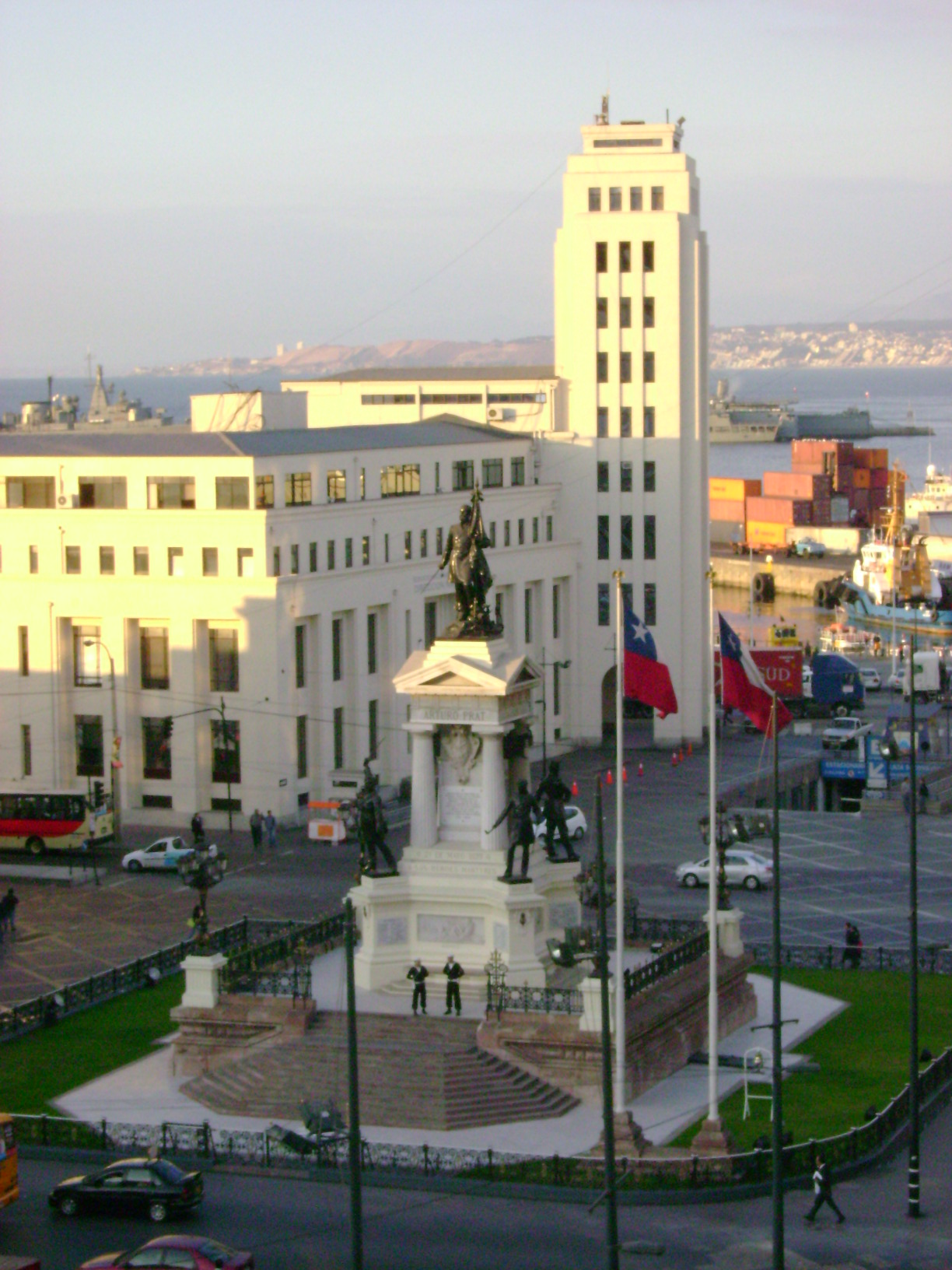
Monument dedicated to the Heroes of Iquique

The Sotomayor Square (Spanish: Plaza Sotomayor) is a town square in Valparaíso, Chile. It is named after Rafael Sotomayor. The square is lined by buildings occupying full block-fronts of the streets that flank it. The focus of the square is the monument that honors the Chilean sailors who fell during the Battle of Iquique and the Battle of Punta Gruesa. The square and surrounding buildings were designated a Zona Típica (historic district) on 23 January 1979.

At the northeastern side of the square are two similar towers, which create a sort of gate entrance to the port from the city. On the opposite side is the building that housed the Intendencia de Valparaíso, which currently is home to the headquarters of the Chilean Navy. The building used by the CSAV and the building that houses the National Council of Culture and the Arts also face the square.

Close to the station is the western terminus station of the Valparaíso Metro, that replaced the old railway station.

== History ==
Sotomayor Square originally called Plaza de la Aduana (Customs Square), then Plaza del Palacio (Palace Square) and later Plaza Intendencia (Intendancy Square), is the most important civic square in Valparaíso, which was built over previous sealand. The history of the city lays in it, consisting of buildings from different periods that merge into one big area. It didn't always have a trapezoid shape as it does today, which helps to create a different perspective effect, neither had the decisive axis between the main building — the former intendancy building — nor its view of the ocean. Originally, it was an esplanade in which filthy water descended sluggishly through San Agustín (Tomás Ramos) gorge, standing next to the current Plaza de la Justicia (Justice Square). Also, a large house near to Cerro Cordillera (Cordillera Hill) played the role of customs.

On 10 June 1825 a storm broke the cables of the frigate Valdivia and stranded her on the beach that existed here. The authorities filled the hulk with sand in order to use it as a base for Valparaíso's first wharf for passengers and light cargo. Subsequently, in 1831, the passengers' wharf started to be built, whose remains can be seen today at the museum right under the square.

After the construction of the first customs building, the most representative building of the city for almost seventy years, a square started to be built next to it. Although it was smaller and the building line was several meters ahead of the current facades, in the mid-century the latter was extended to Condell Street. In addition, some warehouses were built around it and also hotels and inns.

In 1855 came into existence in this square the first bank in Chile called the Banco de Depósitos y Descuentos de Valparaíso (The Deposits and Discounts Bank of Valparaíso), occupying part of the current square in front of the land of the present National Council of Culture and the Arts. The Bolsa de Comercio building was constructed with wood and cane from Guayaquil in 1858 and designed by the architect Juan Berg, who created a porch to access the city from the sea. The Bolsa de Comercio was inaugurated in the same year, 6 May with a special ceremony led by the President of Chile, Manuel Montt. Additionally, in the year 1866, the city of Valparaíso was bombed by the Spanish Navy during the Chincha Islands War originating from a trade dispute between Spain and Peru. Although Spain tried to burn down the Bolsa de Comercio, the building survived the attack and it was repaired afterwards. The construction of the first Post Office, next to the Bank in the corner of the Aduana (Prat) Street, and the fire department building, between Blanco and Cochrane Streets, both dating from 1868, contributed decisively to the characterization of the square as a civic one. These were neoclassical buildings that would be later replaced in the first half of the 20th century by modern architecture but preserving its early use.

In 1873, the square was already cobbled when the first sculpture of Valparaíso was built in 12 April, commemorating the Scottish seamen Lord Thomas Cochrane. In 1876, the railway crossed around the shore in front of the wharf and went from the current Errázuriz Street towards the Barrio Puerto (Port's Neighbourhood). In the same year, the construction of the Rose Company building took place, which was called Innes, and then Grace, whose facades remained until today as part of the Compañía Sudamericana de Vapores’ building. In 1885, the Bolsa de Comercio (The Stock Exchange) located in Valparaíso square right in front of the Hotel Reina Victoria (Queen Victoria Hotel) had to be demolished to install in its place the great monument to the fallen heroes in the Battle of Iquique and the crypt of the remains of Arturo Prat and his men, which would be inaugurated on 21 May 1886. The following year, a neoclassical building was built on the grounds of the current port station that was meant to serve as the administration of the Navy and other public uses, and would remain so until 1920. In 1883, a comfortable passengers' wharf was ordered to be built. Made of wood and metal with hexagonal shape, this passengers’ wharf also known as Muelle Prat (Prat wharf), would last until 1912 when it was swept away by a storm. Until the early 20th century there was still a building in front of the Queen Victoria Hotel occupying part of the Estación Puerto (Port Station) and the customs building, which were built in the 30s.

In 2000, the Ministry of Housing and Urban Development (es) inaugurated the work of remodeling the square, directed by the architect Harken Jensen, where a concession was granted for subterranean parking lots, and additionally, a museum was inaugurated due to archeological findings in the same place. In 2004, the design of the square extends to the Prat Wharf, turning it into a touristic walkway from which was possible to embark in order to cross the roadstead of Valparaíso from the sea. At the Prat wharf is possible to see a replica of the Santiaguillo (es), a small sailing boat which was the first Spaniard vessel to dock in this bay called Quintil. The first wharf completed in 1883 corresponds to the passengers’ wharf, made of wood and metal with hexagonal shape.

== See also ==
- Barrio Puerto, port neighborhood or district
