= List of earthquakes in 1906 =

Earthquakes in 1906
Approximate epicenters of the earthquakes in 1906
- 4.0–5.9 magnitude
- 6.0–6.9 magnitude
- 7.0–7.9 magnitude
- 8.0+ magnitude
- Strongest: Ecuador, Esmeraldas Province, (Magnitude 8.8) January 31
- Deadliest: Chile, Valparaíso Region, (Magnitude 8.2) August 17 4,000 deaths
- Total fatalities: 7,507

Number by magnitude
- 9.0+: 0
- 8.0–8.9: 5
- 7.0–7.9: 18
- 6.0–6.9: 15
- 5.0–5.9: 3

This is a list of earthquakes in 1906. Only magnitude 6.0 or greater earthquakes appear on the list. Exceptions to this are earthquakes that caused death, injury, or damage. Events in remote areas are excluded from the list as they were not significantly documented. All dates are listed according to GMT time. In 1906, there were several significant, historic earthquakes.

== Overall ==
=== By death toll ===
Rank	Death toll	Magnitude	Location	MMI	Depth (km)	Date
1	4,000	8.2	Chile, Valparaíso	XI (Extreme)	35.0	August 16
2	3,000	7.9	United States, California	XI (Extreme)	10.0	April 18
3	1,258	6.8	(Japan) Taiwan, Chiayi	( )	5.0	March 17
4	1,000	8.8	Ecuador, Esmeraldas	IX (Violent)	20.0	January 31
5	280	8.0	(Qing dynasty) China, Xinjiang	IX (Violent)	0.0	December 22
= 6	101	5.5	(Qing dynasty) China, Yunnan	VII (Very strong)	0.0	January 7
= 6	101	6.5	(Qing dynasty) China, Fujian	VIII (Severe)	0.0	March 28
8	51	8.0	German New Guinea, Morobe	( )	35.0	September 14
9	15	7.1	(Japan) Taiwan, Chiayi	( )	5.0	April 13

- Note: At least 10 casualties

=== By magnitude ===
Rank	Magnitude	Death toll	Location	MMI	Depth (km)	Date
1	8.8	1,000	Ecuador, Esmeraldas Province	IX (Violent)	20.0	January 31
2	8.3	0	United States, Rat Islands, Alaska	( )	110.0	August 17
3	8.2	4,000	Chile, Valparaíso Region	XI (Extreme)	35.0	August 17
4	8.0	51	German New Guinea, Morobe Province	( )	35.0	September 14
5	8.0	280	(Qing dynasty) China, northern Xinjiang Province	IX (Violent)	15.0	December 22
6	7.9	700	United States, San Pablo Bay, California	XI (Extreme)	10.0	April 18
7	7.4	0	Japan, off south coast of Honshu	( )	300.0	January 21
= 8	7.2	0	Mexico, Revilla Gigedo Islands	( )	0.0	April 10
= 8	7.2	0	German New Guinea, Bismarck Sea	( )	0.0	October 2
= 8	7.2	0	northwest of Australia	( )	0.0	November 19
= 8	7.2	0	France, north of Martinique	( )	100.0	December 3
= 8	7.2	0	Tonga	( )	0.0	December 19
= 8	7.2	0	United States, Kodiak Island, Alaska	( )	0.0	December 23
= 14	7.1	0	Solomon Islands	( )	0.0	February 19
= 14	7.1	15	(Japan) Taiwan, Chiayi County	( )	5.0	April 13
= 14	7.1	0	German New Guinea, Ninigo Islands	( )	0.0	June 1
= 14	7.1	0	Bay of Bengal	( )	60.0	June 24
= 14	7.1	0	Chile, Tarapacá Region	( )	0.0	August 30
= 14	7.1	0	(United States) Philippines, Babuyan Islands	( )	60.0	October 17
= 20	7.0	0	German New Guinea, Bismarck Sea	( )	0.0	August 26
= 20	7.0	0	Japan, southeast of Honshu	( )	35.0	September 7
= 20	7.0	0	Afghanistan, Balkh Province	( )	35.0	October 24
= 20	7.0	0	Chile, off coast of Tarapacá Region	( )	35.0	December 26

- Note: At least 7.0 magnitude

== Notable events ==
=== January ===
January
- Strongest: 8.8 M_{w} Ecuador
- Deadliest: 8.8 M_{w} Ecuador; 1,000 deaths
- Total fatalities: 1,101

Number by magnitude
- 8.0–8.9: 1
- 7.0–7.9: 1
- 6.0–6.9: 0
- 5.0–5.9: 1

Date	Country and location	M_{w}	Depth (km)	MMI	Notes	Casualties	
Date	Country and location	M_{w}	Depth (km)	MMI	Notes	Dead	Injured
7	(Qing dynasty) China, Yunnan Province	5.5	0.0	VII	At least 101 deaths were reported. Some damage was caused. Depth unknown.	101	
21	Japan, off the south coast of Honshu	7.4	300.0				
31	Ecuador, Esmeraldas Province	8.8	20.0	IX	The 1906 Ecuador–Colombia earthquake was one of the largest of all time. 1,000 deaths were caused. Major damage was reported and a tsunami, which caused some destruction, was generated.	1,000	

=== February ===
February
- Strongest: 7.1 M_{w} Solomon Islands
- Total fatalities: 0

Number by magnitude
- 8.0–8.9: 0
- 7.0–7.9: 1
- 6.0–6.9: 0

Date	Country and location	M_{w}	Depth (km)	MMI	Notes	Casualties	
Date	Country and location	M_{w}	Depth (km)	MMI	Notes	Dead	Injured
16	(United Kingdom) Saint Lucia	0.0	0.0	VIII	Some damage was caused. Magnitude and depth unknown.		
19	Solomon Islands	7.1	0.0				

=== March ===
March
- Strongest: 6.8 M_{w} 2 events
- Deadliest: 6.8 M_{w} (Japan) Taiwan; 1,258 deaths
- Total fatalities: 1,359

Number by magnitude
- 8.0–8.9: 0
- 7.0–7.9: 0
- 6.0–6.9: 4

Date	Country and location	M_{w}	Depth (km)	MMI	Notes	Casualties	
Date	Country and location	M_{w}	Depth (km)	MMI	Notes	Dead	Injured
2	(Qing dynasty) China, southern Xinjiang Province	6.7	20.0				
3	Ecuador, north of the Galápagos Islands	7.0	0.0				
16	(Japan) Taiwan, Chiayi County	6.8	5.0		The 1906 Meishan earthquake resulted in 1,258 deaths and 145 injuries. 6,769 homes were destroyed.	1,258	145
28	(Qing dynasty) China, Fujian Province	6.5	0.0	VIII	At least 101 people were killed and another 101 were injured.	101	101

=== April ===
April
- Strongest: 7.9 M_{w} United States
- Deadliest: 7.9 M_{w} United States; 3,000 deaths
- Total fatalities: 3,015

Number by magnitude
- 8.0–8.9: 0
- 7.0–7.9: 3
- 6.0–6.9: 1

Date	Country and location	M_{w}	Depth (km)	MMI	Notes	Casualties	
Date	Country and location	M_{w}	Depth (km)	MMI	Notes	Dead	Injured
10	Mexico, Revilla Gigedo Islands	7.2	0.0				
13	(Japan) Taiwan, Chiayi County	7.1	5.0		15 people were killed and another 84 were injured. 1,794 homes were destroyed.	15	84
13	(Japan) Taiwan, Chiayi County	6.9	5.0		Aftershock.		
18	United States, San Pablo Bay, California	7.9	10.0	XI	The 1906 San Francisco earthquake was the worst in California's history. The death toll was between 700 and 3,000. The subsequent fire resulted in much of the destruction and death toll. 28,188 homes were destroyed. $400 million in damage costs were reported.	700 to 3,000	

=== May ===
May
- Strongest: 5.3 M_{w} (Qing dynasty) China
- Deadliest: 5.3 M_{w} (Qing dynasty) China; 1 death
- Total fatalities: 1

Number by magnitude
- 8.0–8.9: 0
- 7.0–7.9: 0
- 6.0–6.9: 0
- 5.0–5.9: 1

Date	Country and location	M_{w}	Depth (km)	MMI	Notes	Casualties	
Date	Country and location	M_{w}	Depth (km)	MMI	Notes	Dead	Injured
1	(Qing dynasty) China, Yunnan Province	5.3	0.0	VII	1 person was killed and many homes were destroyed. Depth unknown.	1	

=== June ===
June
- Strongest: 7.1 M_{w} 2 events
- Total fatalities: 0

Number by magnitude
- 8.0–8.9: 0
- 7.0–7.9: 2
- 6.0–6.9: 1

Date	Country and location	M_{w}	Depth (km)	MMI	Notes	Casualties	
Date	Country and location	M_{w}	Depth (km)	MMI	Notes	Dead	Injured
1	German New Guinea, Ninigo Islands	7.1	0.0				
19	(United States) Philippines, Batanes Islands	6.9	60.0				
24	Bay of Bengal	7.1	60.0				

=== August ===
August
- Strongest: 8.3 M_{w} United States
- Deadliest: 8.2 M_{w} Chile; 4,000 deaths
- Total fatalities: 4,000

Number by magnitude
- 8.0–8.9: 2
- 7.0–7.9: 2
- 6.0–6.9: 3

Date	Country and location	M_{w}	Depth (km)	MMI	Notes	Casualties	
Date	Country and location	M_{w}	Depth (km)	MMI	Notes	Dead	Injured
17	United States, Rat Islands, Alaska	8.3	110.0				
17	Chile, Valparaíso Region	8.2	35.0	XI	The 1906 Valparaíso earthquake caused 4,000 deaths. Major damage was caused with costs being at least $100 million (1906 rate).	4,000	
19	Chile, off the coast of Valparaíso Region	6.9	0.0		Aftershock. Depth unknown.		
25	Ethiopia, Oromia Region	6.5	15.0				
26	German New Guinea, Bismarck Sea	7.0	0.0				
30	Chile, Tarapacá Region	7.1	0.0		Depth unknown.		
31	(India) Myanmar, Sagaing Region	6.7	100.0				

=== September ===
September
- Strongest: 8.0 M_{w} German New Guinea
- Deadliest: 8.0 M_{w} German New Guinea; 51 deaths
- Total fatalities: 51

Number by magnitude
- 8.0–8.9: 1
- 7.0–7.9: 1
- 6.0–6.9: 2

Date	Country and location	M_{w}	Depth (km)	MMI	Notes	Casualties	
Date	Country and location	M_{w}	Depth (km)	MMI	Notes	Dead	Injured
7	Japan, southeast of Honshu	7.0	35.0				
14	German New Guinea, Morobe Province	8.0	35.0		At least 51 deaths were caused along with major damage. A tsunami was reported.	51	
17	German New Guinea, Bismarck Sea	6.8	0.0		Depth unknown.		
28	Peru, Loreto Region	6.8	100.0	VII	Some damage was caused.		

=== October ===
October
- Strongest: 7.2 M_{w} German New Guinea
- Total fatalities: 0

Number by magnitude
- 8.0–8.9: 0
- 7.0–7.9: 3
- 6.0–6.9: 2

Date	Country and location	M_{w}	Depth (km)	MMI	Notes	Casualties	
Date	Country and location	M_{w}	Depth (km)	MMI	Notes	Dead	Injured
2	German New Guinea, Bismarck Sea	7.2	0.0		A tsunami was reported as well as some damage. Depth unknown.		
8	Russian Empire, Sea of Okhotsk	6.7	200.0				
17	(United States) Philippines, Babuyan Islands	7.1	60.0				
24	Afghanistan, Balkh Province	7.0	35.0				
24	Afghanistan, Balkh Province	6.8	32.0		Aftershock.		

=== November ===
November
- Strongest: 7.2 M_{w} Indian Ocean
- Total fatalities: 0

Number by magnitude
- 8.0–8.9: 0
- 7.0–7.9: 1
- 6.0–6.9: 1
- 5.0–5.9: 1

Date	Country and location	M_{w}	Depth (km)	MMI	Notes	Casualties	
Date	Country and location	M_{w}	Depth (km)	MMI	Notes	Dead	Injured
14	France, southeast of the Loyalty Islands, New Caledonia	6.9	0.0		Depth unknown.		
19	southern Indian Ocean	7.2	0.0		Depth unknown.		
20	(Gold Coast (British colony)) Ghana, Volta Region	5.0	0.0	VIII	Many homes were destroyed. Depth unknown.		

=== December ===
December
- Strongest: 8.0 M_{w} (Qing dynasty) China
- Deadliest: 8.0 M_{w} (Qing dynasty) China; 280 deaths
- Total fatalities: 280

Number by magnitude
- 8.0–8.9: 0
- 7.0–7.9: 5
- 6.0–6.9: 1

Date	Country and location	M_{w}	Depth (km)	MMI	Notes	Casualties	
Date	Country and location	M_{w}	Depth (km)	MMI	Notes	Dead	Injured
3	France, north of Martinique	7.2	100.0				
18	Tonga	6.8	0.0		Foreshock. Depth unknown.		
19	Tonga	7.2	0.0		Depth unknown.		
22	(Qing dynasty) China, northern Xinjiang Province	8.0	15.0	IX	The 1906 Manasi earthquake killed 280 people and destroyed over 2,000 homes.	280	
23	United States, Kodiak Island, Alaska	7.2	0.0		Depth unknown.		
26	Chile, off the coast of Tarapacá Region	7.0	0.0		Depth unknown.		
