= 1906 Aleutian Islands earthquake =

Earthquake in Alaska

- Location within Alaska Location within North Pacific
- UTC time: 1906-08-17 00:11:10
- ISC event
- USGS-ANSS: ComCat
- Local date: August 16, 1906
- Local time: 14:11
- Magnitude: 8.35 M_{w}
- Epicenter: 51.8°N 178.18°E
- Areas affected: Alaska; United States
- Casualties: None

The 1906 Aleutian Islands earthquake occurred at 00:11 UTC on August 17. It had an estimated seismic moment of 3.8 × 10^{28} dyn cm^{−1}, equivalent to a magnitude of 8.35 on the moment magnitude scale. This earthquake was followed thirty minutes later by the 1906 Valparaíso earthquake in Chile, but the two events are not thought to be linked. Due to the remote location, there are no reports of damage associated with this earthquake. A transpacific tsunami reported from Japan and Hawaii was triggered by the Chilean event, rather than the Aleutian Islands earthquake.

== Tectonic setting ==
The Aleutian Islands are a volcanic arc lying above the convergent boundary where the Pacific plate is being subducted beneath the North American plate. Earthquakes in the area are caused by movement along the plate interface (such as the 1965 Rat Islands earthquake), normal faulting within the outer rise and within the subducting slab. The earthquake's epicenter lies close to a major break in the Aleutian chain, between the Andreanof Islands to the east and the Rat Islands to the west, along what is known as the Amchitka channel. In this region there is evidence for a tear in the lithosphere of the descending slab. It is thought that this tear is caused by the unusually sharp curvature of this part of the arc coupled with the interaction of Bowers Ridge in the over-riding plate with the subduction zone.

== Earthquake characteristics ==
Analysis of this earthquake using modern techniques has been possible due to the large collection of seismograms recording this event published in 1907. They came from 78 stations around the world and included details of the characteristics of the individual seismometers. The focal mechanism of the earthquake has been determined from the seismograms as a normal faulting event within the subducting slab, with a large component of left-lateral strike-slip faulting.

A tsunami was recorded in both Japan and Hawaii in the hours following the earthquake. A run-up of 3.5 m (11 ft) reported from Maui was too early to be related to either of the earthquakes. Based on the estimated focal mechanism of the Aleutian Islands event and the timing of the observed run-ups, the tsunami is thought to have resulted from the earthquake in Chile.

== Relationship to the 1906 Valparaíso earthquake ==
The short time interval between these two major earthquake has raised the possibility of the event in Chile being triggered in some way by the earlier earthquake in the Aleutian Islands, particularly as the later event occurred during the passage of the wavefronts of its body waves through the epicentral area. However, this is regarded as most likely coincidental.

== See also ==
- List of earthquakes in 1906
- List of earthquakes in Alaska
- List of earthquakes in the United States
