= Pajaritos metro station =

Santiago metro station

Pajaritos
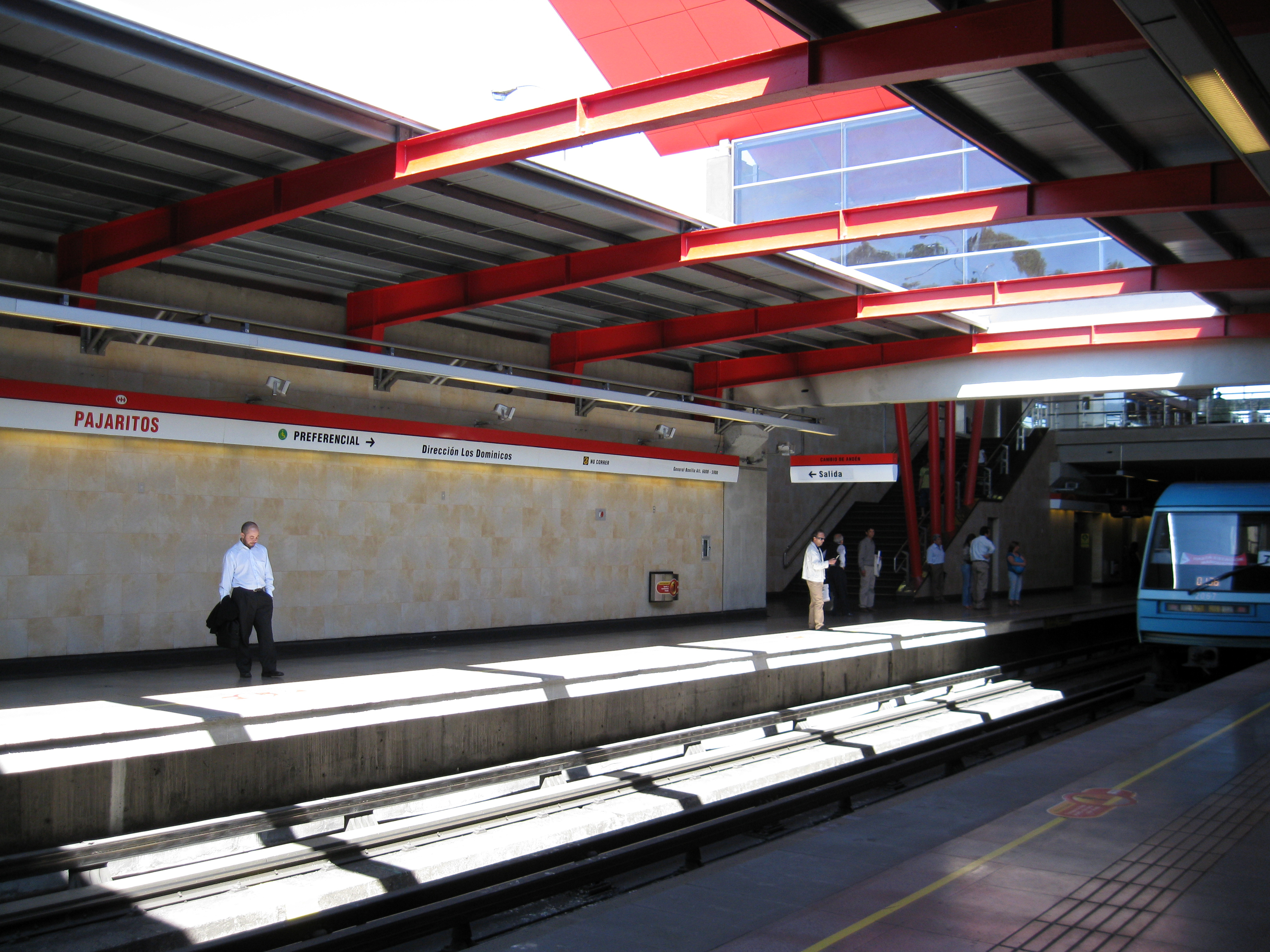
- The newer portion of the station.

General information
- Location: General Bonilla Avenue / Santa Marta Street
- Coordinates: 33°27′26.62″S 70°42′57.52″W
- System: Santiago rapid transit
- Line: Line 1
- Platforms: 2 side platforms
- Tracks: 3
- Connections: Transantiago buses Intermodal bus station

Construction
- Accessible: yes

History
- Opened: September 15, 1975

Services
Preceding station	Santiago Metro	Following station
Neptuno towards San Pablo	Line 1	Las Rejas towards Los Dominicos
Location

Pajaritos is a metro station on the Line 1 of the Santiago Metro, in Santiago, Chile. Ruta 68 and General Bonilla Avenue run parallel to the station. The station was opened on 15 September 1975 as part of the inaugural section of the line between San Pablo and La Moneda.

It has a moderate flow of passengers, being placed in a residential-industrial area. The flow of passengers has grown since 2004, due to a nearby intercity bus station serving Valparaíso, Viña del Mar, Quilpué, Curacaví and the Arturo Merino Benitez international airport.

Near the station there are the Chilean Investigations Police school, and the grounds of an old amusement park, Mundomágico, which has become the Cultural Center of Lo Prado city.

In 2009, one of the platforms was partially demolished to make way for a third track, which made necessary the partial rebuilding of the station east of its original location. The project included an additional street-level mezzanine. The central track is currently used for reversing the direction of trains.

== Etymology ==
The name of the metro station comes from the Pajaritos avenue, placed near the station.

== Destinations (intermodal bus station) ==
Bus company	Destinations
Pullman Bus	Valparaíso - Viña del Mar - Quilpué - Villa Alemana - Curacaví - Casablanca
Tur Bus	Valparaíso - Viña del Mar - Quilpué - Villa Alemana - Curauma - ENEA - Arturo Merino Benítez International Airport
Condor Bus	Valparaíso - Viña del Mar - Curauma
Romani	Viña del Mar - Valparaíso
Palmira - Ruta Curacaví	Curacaví - María Pinto - Casablanca
Atevil	Curacaví - María Pinto - Casablanca
Centropuerto	ENEA - Arturo Merino Benítez International Airport
