= El Golf metro station =

Santiago metro station

El Golf
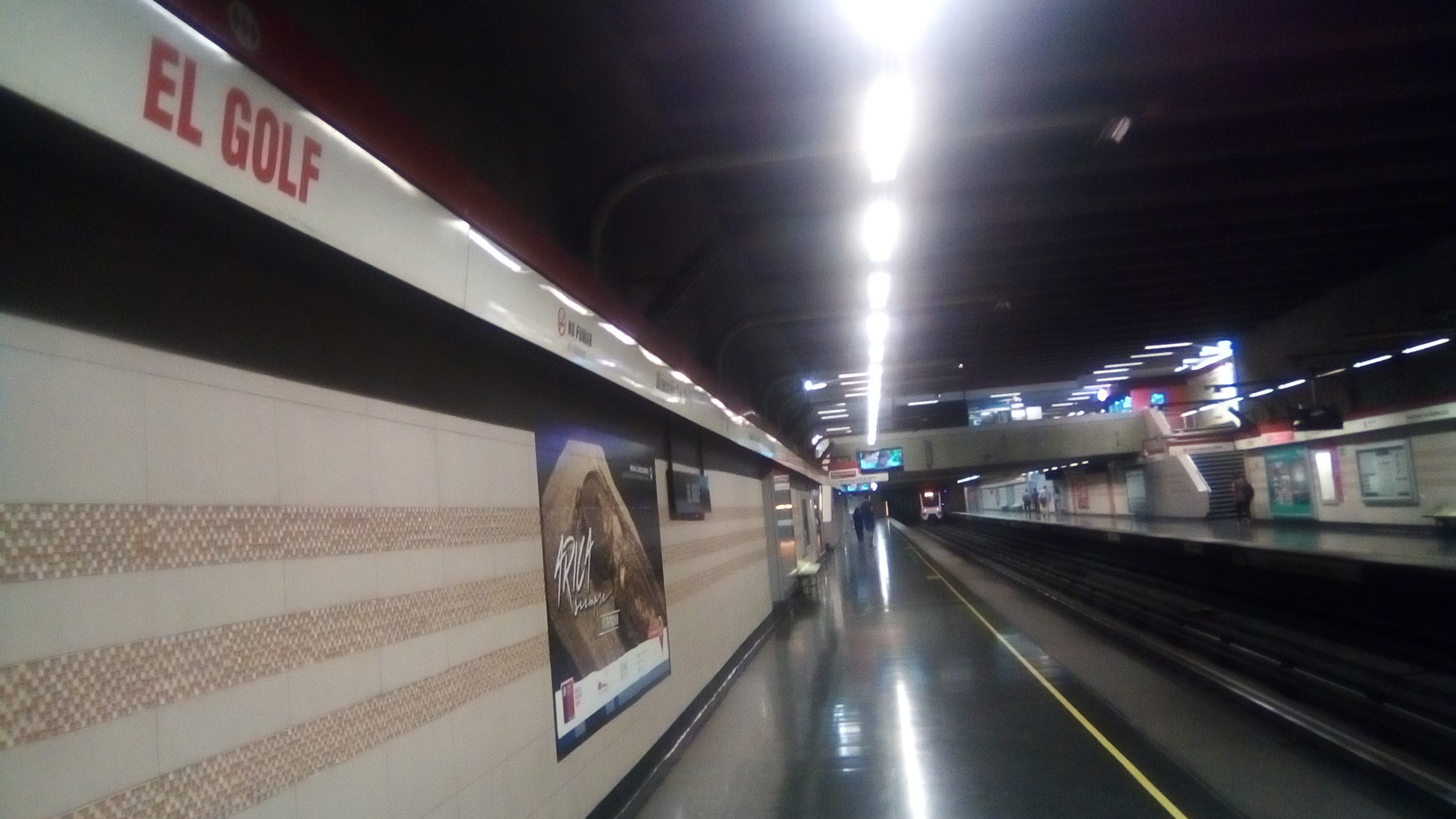

General information
- Location: Apoquindo Avenue / El Regidor Street
- Coordinates: 33°24′59.54″S 70°35′43.52″W
- System: Santiago rapid transit
- Line: Line 1
- Platforms: 2 side platforms
- Tracks: 2
- Connections: Transantiago buses

Construction
- Accessible: yes

History
- Opened: August 31, 1980

Services
Preceding station	Santiago Metro	Following station
Tobalaba towards San Pablo	Line 1	Alcántara towards Los Dominicos
Location

El Golf is an underground metro station on the Line 1 of the Santiago Metro, in Santiago, Chile. It is located in El Golf neighborhood, close to the building that serves as the seat of local government for Las Condes. The station was opened on 22 August 1980 as part of the extension of the line from Salvador to Escuela Militar.

A work of art by Rodolfo Opazo is installed on the walls of the station.

The station is undergoing renovation work to replace the original wall covering. The work was scheduled to be completed in February 2012.
