= Pedro de Valdivia metro station =

Santiago metro station

Pedro de Valdivia
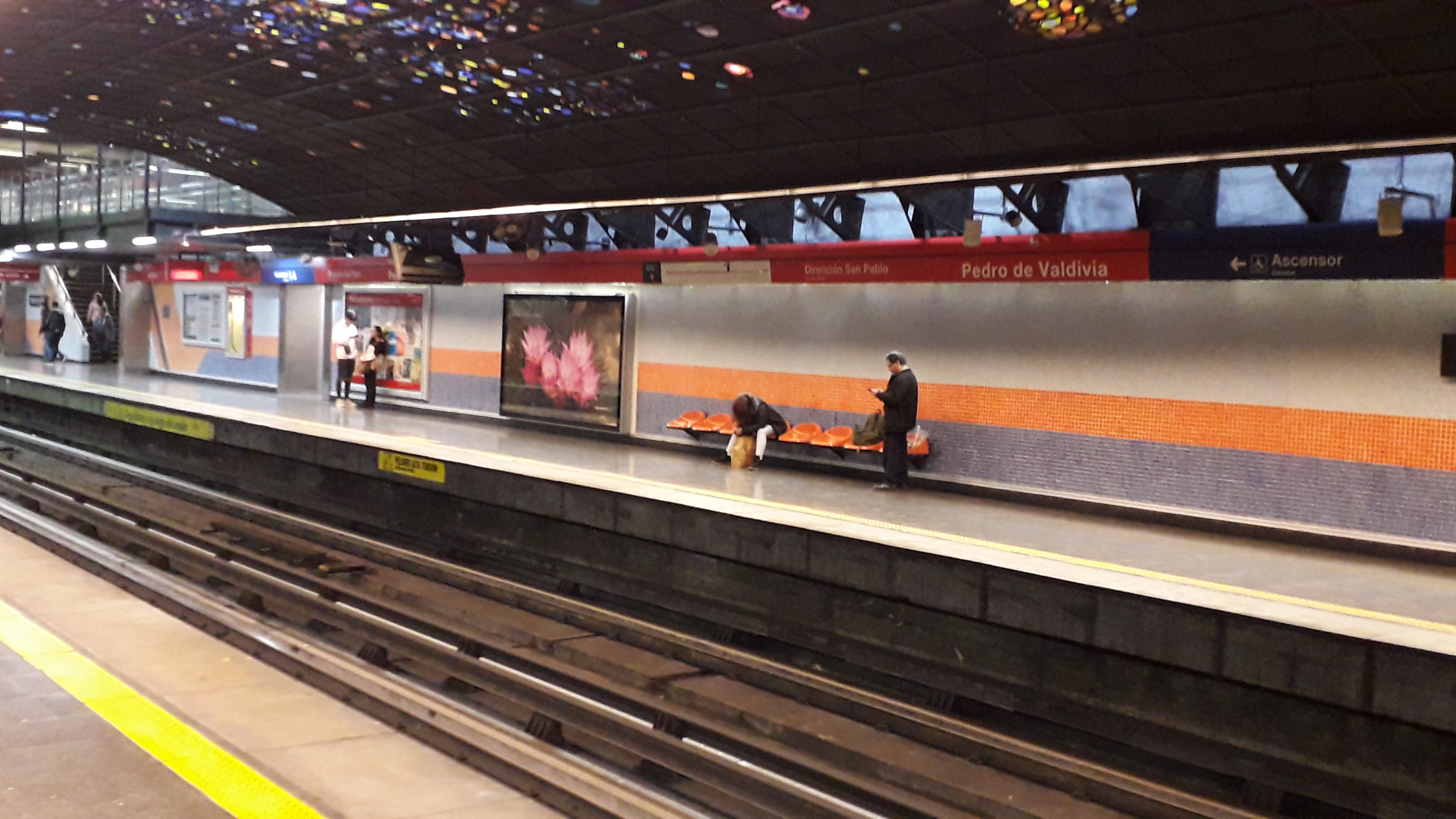

General information
- Location: Nueva Providencia Avenue / Marchant Pereira Street
- Coordinates: 33°25′31.51″S 70°36′52.14″W
- System: Santiago rapid transit
- Line: Line 1
- Platforms: 2 side platforms
- Tracks: 2
- Connections: Red buses

History
- Opened: August 31, 1980; 2028

Services
Preceding station	Santiago Metro	Following station
Manuel Montt towards San Pablo	Line 1	Los Leones towards Los Dominicos
Location

Pedro de Valdivia is an underground metro station on the Line 1 of the Santiago Metro, in Santiago, Chile. The station is named for the nearby Pedro de Valdivia Avenue, which in turn was named for Pedro de Valdivia. It was opened on 22 August 1980 as part of the extension of the line from Salvador to Escuela Militar.

The platform level features a vaulted drop ceiling of stained glass. A second work of art is entitled La Ciudad (The City), which consists of four enameled steel murals placed on the walls of the four platform stairways. Both artworks were unveiled on January 13, 1999.

It is expected that by 2028 this station will be combined with the future Line 7.

== Gallery ==
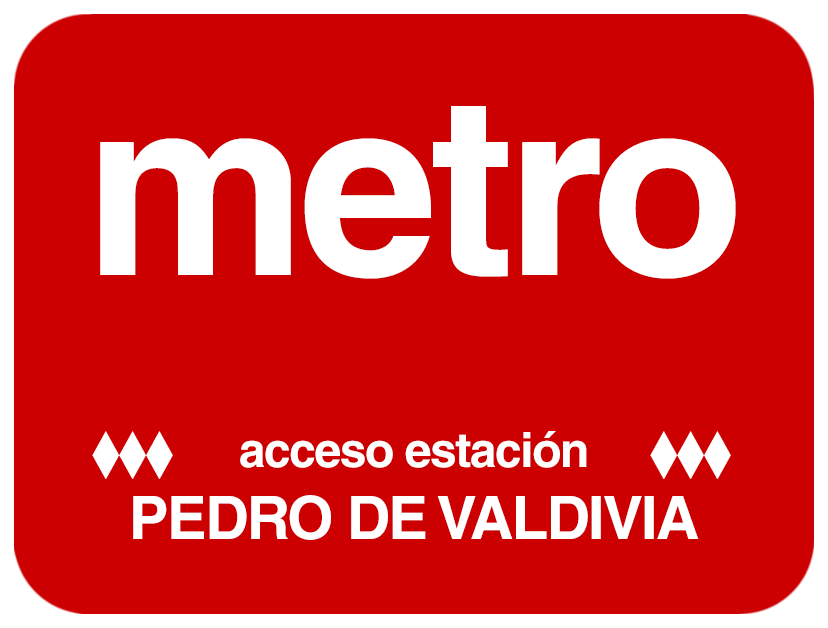
Sign used in access to the station until 1997.

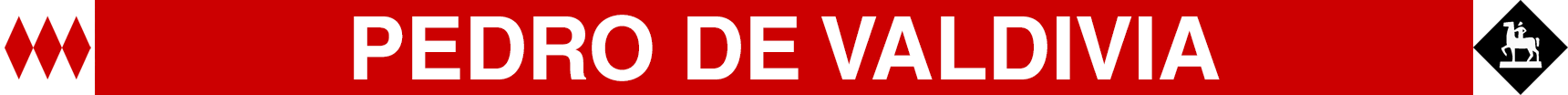
Antique valance used on platforms.

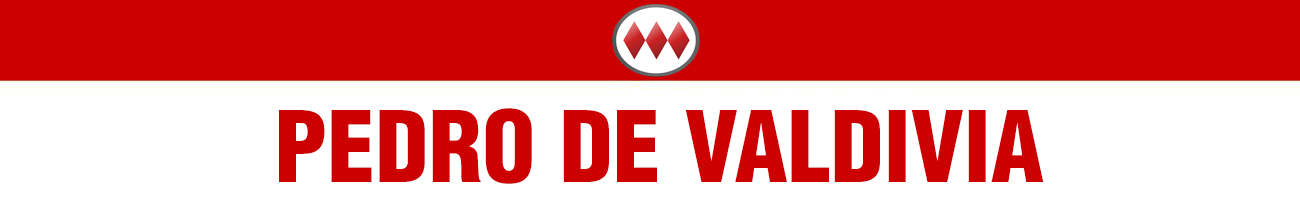
Valance currently used on the platforms until 2019.

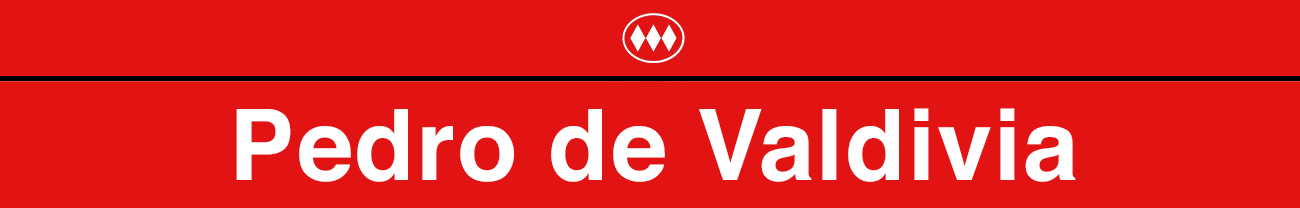
Valance currently used on the platforms since 2019.

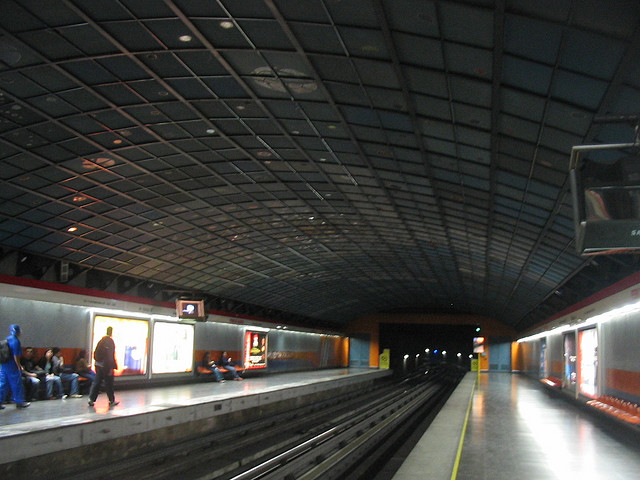
La Noche (The Night), the western portion of the artwork called El Cielo (The Sky)
