= Las Rejas metro station =

Santiago metro station

Las Rejas
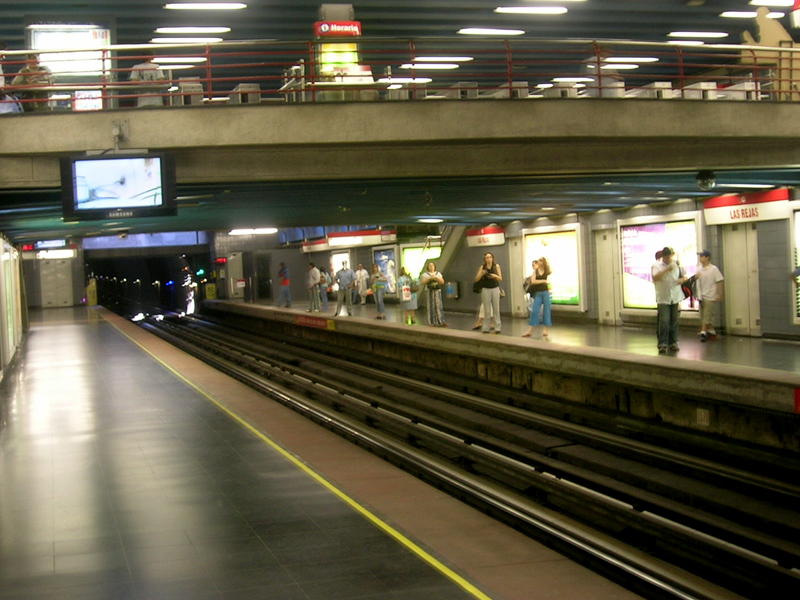

General information
- Location: Alameda / Las Rejas Avenue
- Coordinates: 33°27′26″S 70°42′20″W
- System: Santiago rapid transit
- Line: Line 1
- Platforms: 2 side platforms
- Tracks: 2
- Connections: Transantiago buses

History
- Opened: September 15, 1975

Services
Preceding station	Santiago Metro	Following station
Pajaritos towards San Pablo	Line 1	Ecuador towards Los Dominicos
Location

Las Rejas is an underground metro station on the Line 1 of the Santiago Metro, in Santiago, Chile. It was built in cut-and-cover method. The station was opened on 15 September 1975 as part of the inaugural section of the line between San Pablo and La Moneda.

Stairways at each corner of the concourse mezzanine connect with the platform level. The mezzanine is accessed from ground level via four entrances, two on each side of the Alameda Avenue. Each pair of entrances converge into a single corridor that leads to the mezzanine.

The station features an exposed concrete beam ceiling and its walls are decorated with blue-gray ceramic tiles, which replaced the original mosaic covering. Curved blue panels over the platforms form a sort of large cove molding.

This station has a moderate flow of passengers, increasing in the peak hours by the crowds commuting with Transantiago buses here.

== Etymology ==
The name of the station, comes from the Las Rejas avenue, coming from the old Las Rejas farm.
