= Ecuador metro station =

Santiago metro station

Ecuador
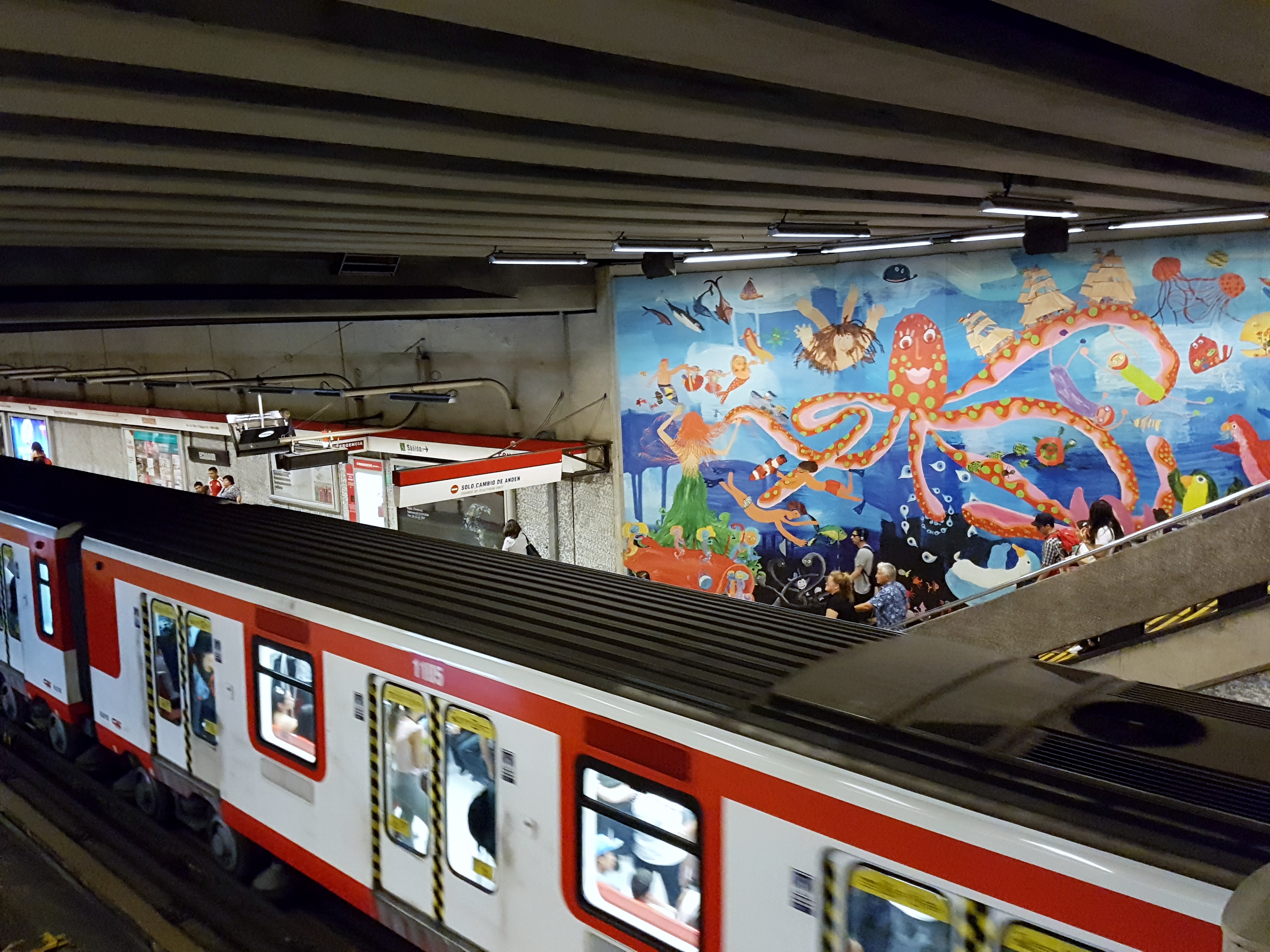
- The station with a stopped train and one of the murals painted by Jorge Artus and the children of the art workshop of the Teletón.

General information
- Location: Alameda / Radal Street
- Coordinates: 33°27′21″S 70°41′58″W
- System: Santiago rapid transit
- Line: Line 1
- Platforms: 2 side platforms
- Tracks: 2
- Connections: Transantiago buses

Construction
- Accessible: yes

History
- Opened: September 15, 1975

Services
Preceding station	Santiago Metro	Following station
Las Rejas towards San Pablo	Line 1	San Alberto Hurtado towards Los Dominicos
Location

Ecuador is an underground metro station on the Line 1 of the Santiago Metro, in Santiago, Chile. Three elevators were installed in 2005, to make the station fully accessible for people who use wheelchairs or have mobility impairments.

The station was opened on 15 September 1975 as part of the inaugural section of the line between San Pablo and La Moneda.
