= Alcántara metro station =

Santiago metro station

Alcántara
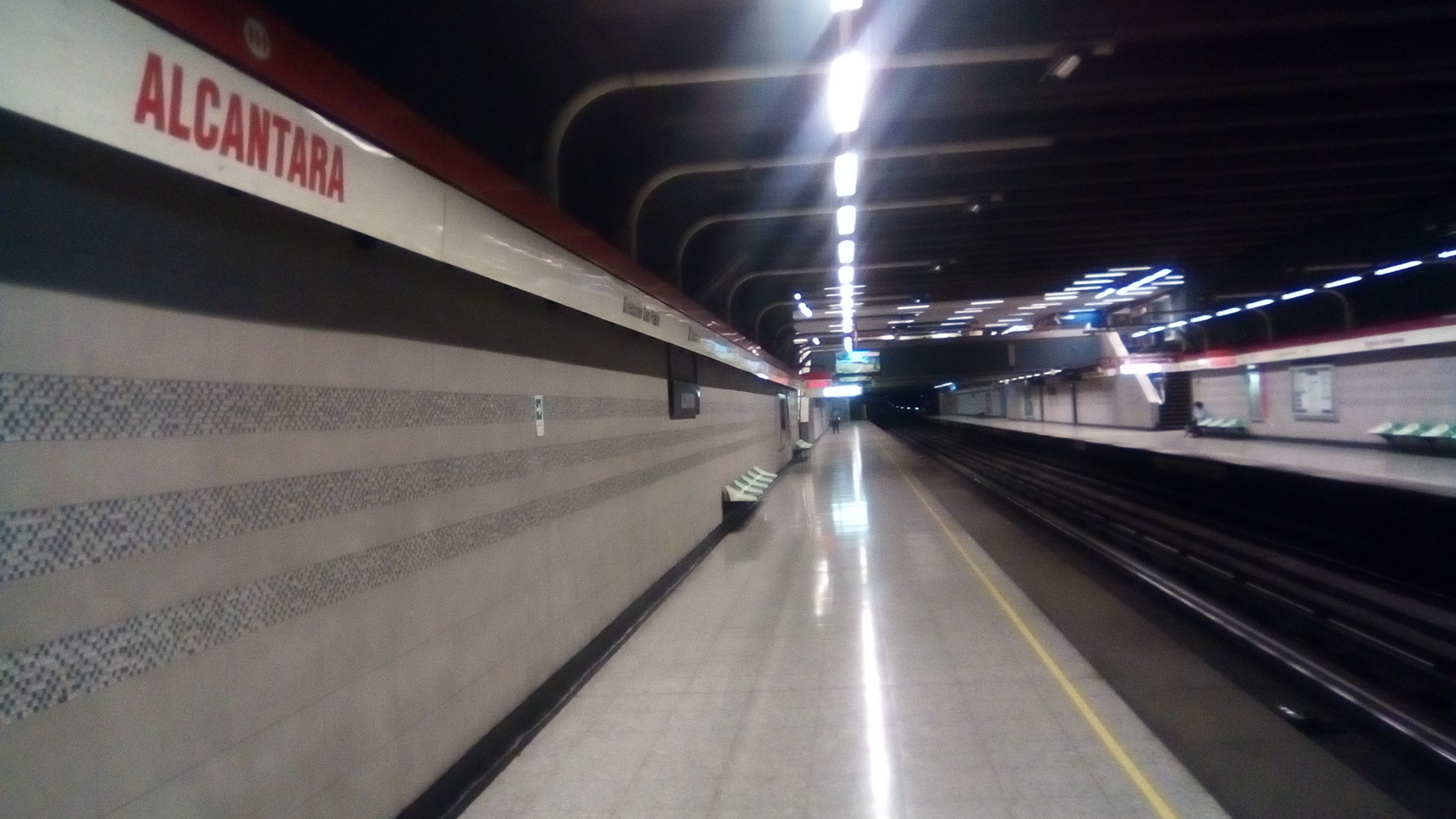

General information
- Location: Apoquindo Avenue / Alcántara Street
- Coordinates: 33°24′55.22″S 70°35′22.3″W
- System: Santiago rapid transit
- Line: Line 1
- Platforms: 2 side platforms
- Tracks: 2
- Connections: Transantiago buses

History
- Opened: August 31, 1980

Services
Preceding station	Santiago Metro	Following station
El Golf towards San Pablo	Line 1	Escuela Militar towards Los Dominicos
Location

Alcántara is an underground metro station on the Line 1 of the Santiago Metro, in Santiago, Chile. The station was opened on 22 August 1980 as part of the extension of the line from Salvador to Escuela Militar.
