= Santiago Metro Line 1 =

Underground Line, Santiago

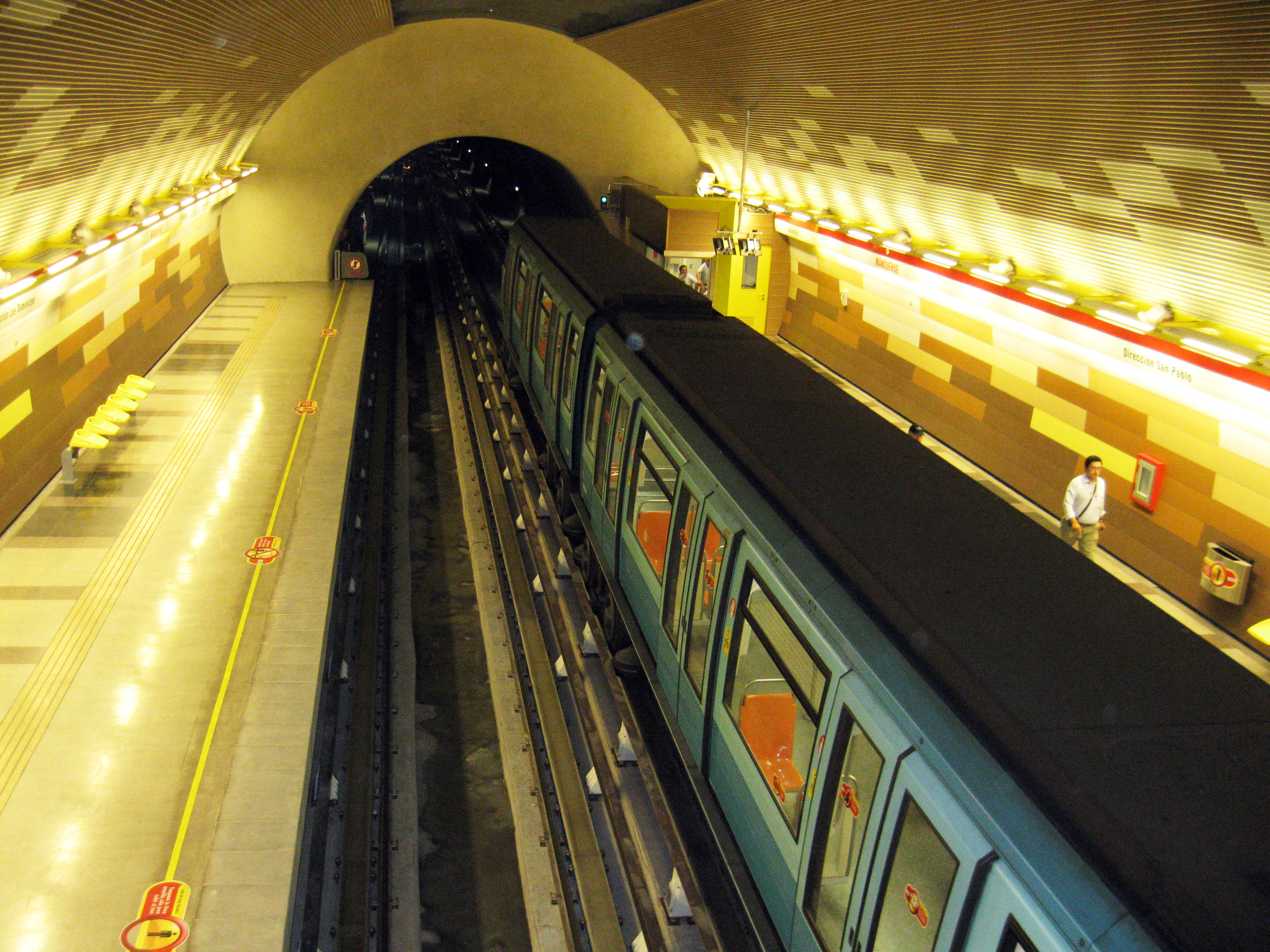
- Train at Manquehue

Overview
- Status: Operational
- Owner: Empresa de Transporte de Pasajeros Metro S.A.
- Locale: Western, central and northeast Santiago
- Termini: San Pablo (western) Pajaritos (western, select services only); Los Domínicos (northeastern) Manquehue (northeastern, select services only)
- Stations: 27

Service
- Type: Rubber-tyred metro
- System: Santiago Metro
- Operator: Empresa de Transporte de Pasajeros Metro S.A.
- Depot: Near Neptuno
- Rolling stock: GEC-Alsthom Metropolis NS 93, CAF NS 2007 and NS 2012
- Daily ridership: 705,200 (2015)

History
- Opened: September 15, 1975; 51 years ago
- Last extension: 2010

Technical
- Line length: 19.3 km (12.0 mi)
- Character: Open cut (San Pablo, Neptuno, Pajaritos); Underground (remainder of line)
- Track gauge: 1,435 mm (4 ft 8 1/2 in) standard gauge
- Electrification: 750 V DC third rail (guide bars)
- Operating speed: 75 km/h (47 mph)

Santiago Metro Line 1 is the oldest of the seven existing rapid transit lines that make up the Santiago Metro system. Being its busiest, it has a total of 27 stations along its 19.3 km (12.0 mi) length, constructed almost entirely underground (save for some open cut sections in the west), and is located primarily along the axis formed by the Avenida Libertador General Bernardo O'Higgins (Libertador General Bernardo O'Higgins Avenue, also known as the “Alameda”), Providencia Avenue and Apoquindo Avenue.

In 2015, Line 1 accounted for 39.5% of all trips made on the metro system with a daily ridership of 705,200, making it the busiest line in the system. It currently connects with five of the six other lines – with Line 2 at Los Héroes station, with Line 3 at Universidad de Chile station, with Line 4 at Tobalaba station in the northeast, with Line 5 at both San Pablo station and Baquedano station and line 6 at Los Leones. There are plans for connections with the future Line 9 at Santa Lucía station, the future Line 7 at Baquedano and Pedro de Valdivia and the future Line 8 at Los Leones. Its distinctive colour on the network line map is red.

During the 2019 Chilean protests, several of the stations were burned and looted, with the closure of the entire system following soon afterwards. Since then, all of the stations have reopened.

== History ==
The line was inaugurated on September 15, 1975, with an initial 8.3 km (5.2 mi) of track running from San Pablo station to La Moneda station. In 1977, the line was extended 3.2 km (2.0 mi) to the east to Salvador station. Then, in 1980, seven more stations opened to the east between Salvador and Escuela Militar. On January 7, 2010, three final stations opened to the east of Escuela Militar: Manquehue, Hernando de Magallanes and Los Dominicos.

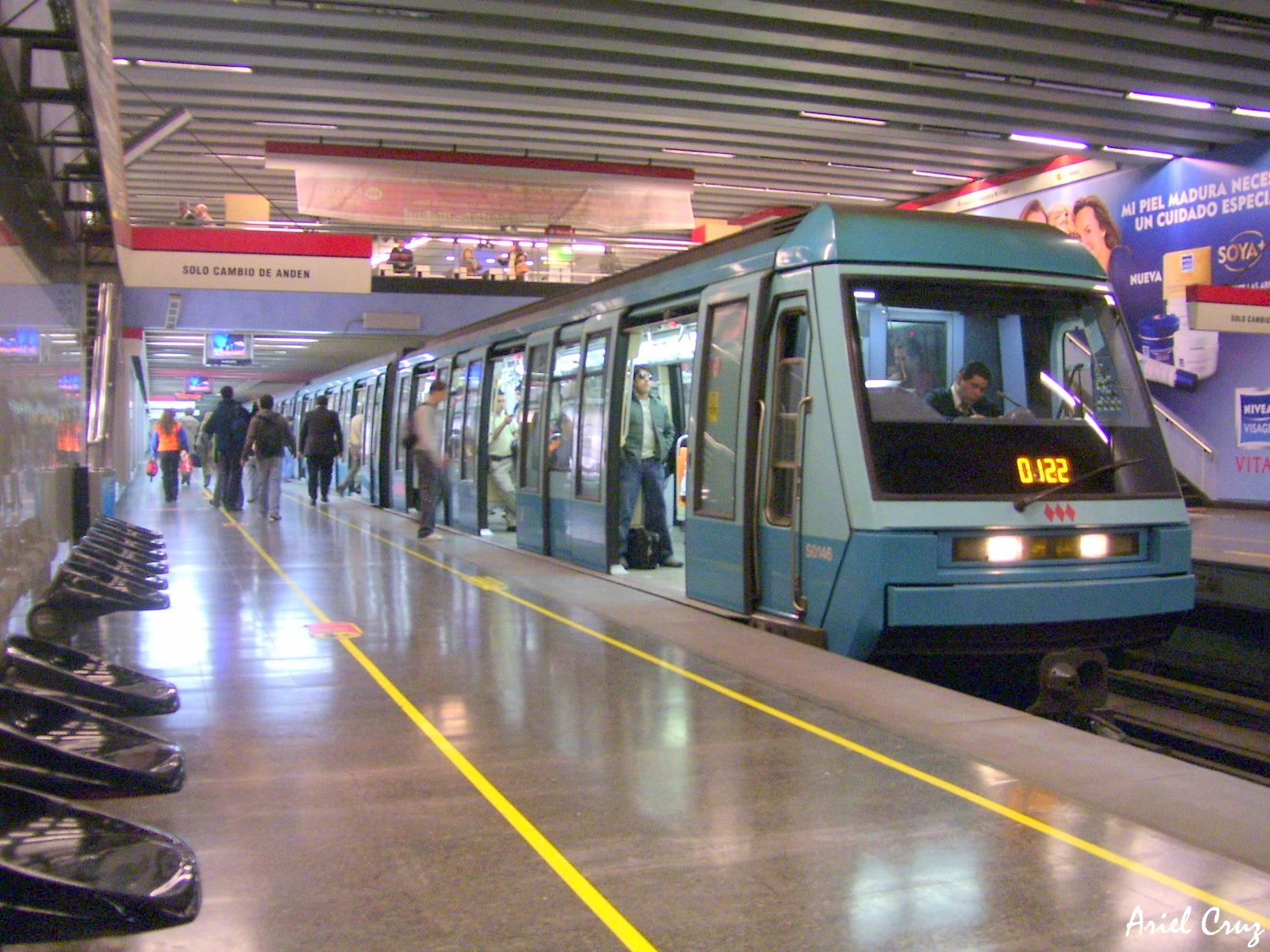
NS 93 train in Tobalaba metro station

=== 1986 terrorist attack ===
One of the most memorable and tragic events in the history of the Santiago Metro was the June 16, 1986 terrorist attack, which took place on Line 1. At 6:56 a.m., the Manuel Rodríguez Patriotic Front, a group opposed to the government of General Pinochet, attacked Tobalaba station with C4 bombs. The bombs exploded and caused the death of one passenger, injured another six, and left one NS-74 train destroyed. Because of this, Metro S.A. (the company that operates the Santiago Metro) decided to replace that trainset, however Alsthom Groupe Brissonneau wasn't producing trains at a fast enough rate, so the company turned their attention towards Concarril, who supplied the Santiago Metro with one NS-88 trainset as a replacement. The destroyed train remained out of service until it was rebuilt by Santiago Metro workers between February 27, 1989 and December 14, 1990, going back into circulation in 1990. The train now bears a commemorative plaque for the attack and its reconstruction.

=== 2014 bombings ===
On 13 July 2014 at 23:00 (local time) a bomb exploded near a train in Los Dominicos station after finishing that day's service. No person was reported injured, and no person or group claimed responsibility.

On 8 September 2014 at 13:53 a fire extinguisher bomb went off at Escuela Militar station, injuring 14 people, including a woman who had her finger amputated. No person or group claim immediate responsibility. It was the most serious attack in recent years up to that point and the national government invoked the Anti-terror law.

2 weeks after the attack on 22 September 2019, 2 men (Juan Flores and Guillermo Durán) and 1 woman (Nataly Casanova) were arrested as prosecutors found evidence of their involvement in the bombings. On 15 March 2018, Juan Flores was sentenced to 23 years's imprisonment and the other two defendants were acquited due to lack of evidence.

=== October 2019 protests ===
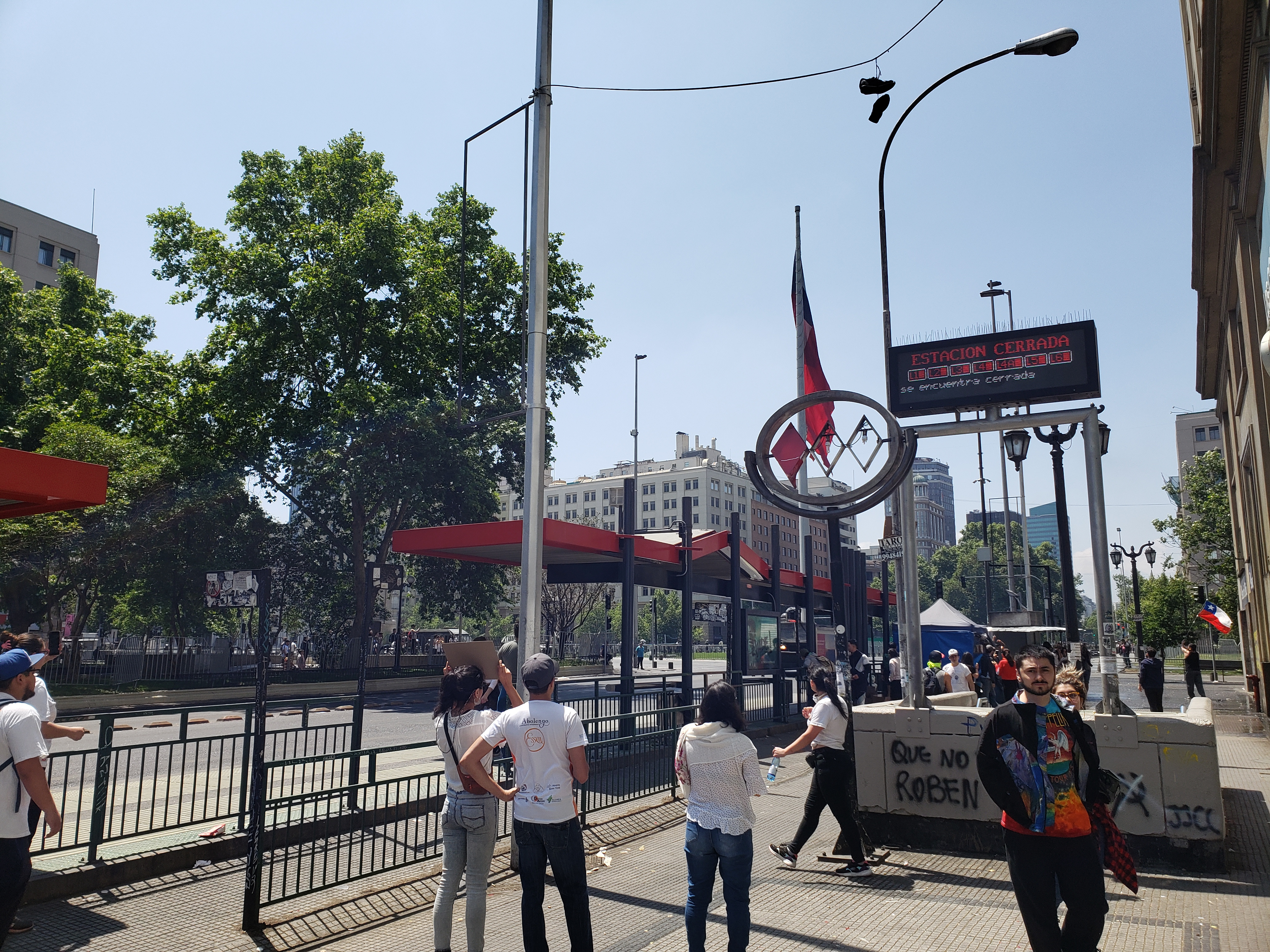
Exterior of the La Moneda metro station in Santiago, October 20, 2019.

A series of protests in October 2019 resulted in major damage to the metro network. Line 1 (which suffered a minor amount of damage compared to lines 4 and 5) was closed on the weekend of October 18 of that year, and resumed partial service two days later between Pajaritos and Los Dominicos; full service was expected to resume in the first half of 2020. San Pablo, Neptuno, and Baquedano stations suffered moderate damage in the protests, and as a result those three stations would temporarily close (resulting in an ability to transfer between lines 1 and 5). However, the Baquedano station has remained closed to the public since the beginning of the protests, however On April 8, 2020, the combination of both lines was enabled, with their accesses closed until May 4 of the same year. Finally, Line 1 was fully operational again on July 25, 2020, with the reopening of the San Pablo and Neptuno stations.

== Future ==
After the announcement of the line 7, it is proposed to extend the line 1 northwards to connect with the line 7 and ending at this point.

Requests have been made by local residents, authorities and the communal mayor for an extension to the commune of Cerro Navia towards Avenida Carrascal (Carrascal Avenue) and the hospital planned for construction in this commune. Although no expansion project has yet begun, studies are being carried for an extension through Cerro Navia.

Requests have been made by local residents, authorities and the communal mayor for an extension to the commune of Las Condes towards Avenida El Alba and the extension for construction in this commune.

== Communes served by Line 1 ==
Line 1 serves the following Santiago communes from west to east:

- Lo Prado
- Estación Central
- Santiago
- Providencia
- Las Condes

== Stations ==
The Line 1 stations (eastbound order) are:

Stations	Transfers	Location	Opening	Commune	Notes
San Pablo	Santiago Metro Line 5	Av. Neptuno and Av. Portales	September 15, 1975	Lo Prado	
Neptuno		Av. Neptuno and Av. Dorsal	September 15, 1975	Lo Prado	
Pajaritos		Av. General Óscar Bonilla and Santa Marta	September 15, 1975	Lo Prado	
Las Rejas		Av. Libertador Bernardo O'Higgins and Av. Las Rejas	September 15, 1975	Lo Prado/Estación Central	
Ecuador		Av. Libertador Bernardo O'Higgins and Radal	September 15, 1975	Estación Central	
San Alberto Hurtado		Av. Libertador Bernardo. O'Higgins and Toro Mazotte	September 15, 1975	Estación Central	
Universidad de Santiago		Av. Libertador Bernardo O'Higgins and Obispo Manuel Umaña	September 15, 1975	Estación Central	
Estación Central		Av. Libertador Bernardo O'Higgins and Av. Matucana	September 15, 1975	Estación Central	
Unión Latinoamericana		Av. Libertador Bernardo O'Higgins and Unión Latinoaméricana	September 15, 1975	Santiago	
República		Av. Libertador Bernardo O'Higgins and Av. Ricardo Cumming	September 15, 1975	Santiago	
Los Héroes	Santiago Metro Line 2	Av. Libertador Bernardo O'Higgins and Av Ejército	September 15, 1975	Santiago	
La Moneda		Av. Libertador Bernardo O'Higgins and Amunátegui	September 15, 1975	Santiago	
Universidad de Chile	Santiago Metro Line 3	Av. Libertador Bernardo O'Higgins and Paseo Ahumada	March 31, 1977	Santiago	
Santa Lucía		Av. Libertador Bernardo O'Higgins and Miraflores	March 31, 1977	Santiago	This station will be future combination with the line in 2032
Universidad Católica		Av. Libertador Bernardo O'Higgins and Av. Portugal	March 31, 1977	Santiago	
Baquedano	Santiago Metro Line 5	Av. Providencia and Av. Vicuña Mackenna	March 31, 1977	Providencia	This station will be future combination with the line in 2028
Salvador		Av. Providencia and Av. Salvador	March 31, 1977	Providencia	
Manuel Montt		Av. Providencia and Av. Manuel Montt	August 31, 1980	Providencia	
Pedro de Valdivia		Av. Nueva Providencia and Av. Pedro de Valdivia	August 31, 1980	Providencia	This station will be future combination with the line in 2028
Los Leones	Santiago Metro Line 6	Av. Nueva Providencia and Av. Suecia	August 31, 1980	Providencia	This station will be future combination with the line in 2030
Tobalaba	Santiago Metro Line 4	Av. Providencia and Av. Tobalaba	August 31, 1980	Providencia	
El Golf		Av. Apoquindo and San Crescente	August 31, 1980	Las Condes	
Alcántara		Av. Apoquindo and Alcántara	August 31, 1980	Las Condes	
Escuela Militar		Av. Apoquindo and Av. Américo Vespucio	August 31, 1980	Las Condes	
Manquehue		Av. Apoquindo and Av. Manquehue	January 7, 2010	Las Condes	
Hernando de Magallanes		Av. Apoquindo and Hernando de Magallanes	January 7, 2010	Las Condes	
Los Dominicos		Av. Apoquindo and Patagonia	January 7, 2010	Las Condes	

== Line 1 Data Sheet ==
- Construction Method:
  - San Pablo: partly underground, partly open-cut.
  - San Pablo - Neptuno section: underground.
  - Neptuno: open-cut.
  - Neptuno - Pajaritos section: underground.
  - Pajaritos: open-cut.
  - Pajaritos – Los Dominicos: underground.

== See also ==
- List of metro systems
- Rail transport in Chile
- Transantiago
- Rubber-tyred metro
