= Neptuno metro station =

Santiago metro station

Neptuno
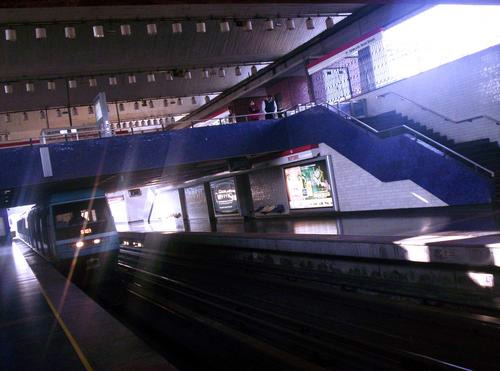

General information
- Location: Neptuno Avenue / Dorsal Avenue
- Coordinates: 33°27′5.43″S 70°43′21.64″W
- System: Santiago rapid transit
- Line: Line 1
- Platforms: 2 side platforms
- Tracks: 2
- Connections: Transantiago buses

History
- Opened: September 15, 1975

Services
Preceding station	Santiago Metro	Following station
San Pablo Terminus	Line 1	Pajaritos towards Los Dominicos
Location

Neptuno is a metro station on the Line 1 of the Santiago Metro, in Santiago, Chile. It is located close to the main maintenance facility for the Metro of Santiago. It has a moderate-low flow of passengers, located in a residential place with no big attractions. The station was opened on 15 September 1975 as part of the inaugural section of the line between San Pablo and La Moneda.

The Neptuno depot, which serves the Line 1, is near the station.

== Etymology ==
The station name comes from the Neptuno Avenue, serving this station. In the times when the Santiago Metro used iconography, this station was represented with a trident and two fishes, representing the sea Roman God, Neptune.
