= Hernando de Magallanes metro station =

Metro station in Santiago, Chile

Hernando de Magallanes
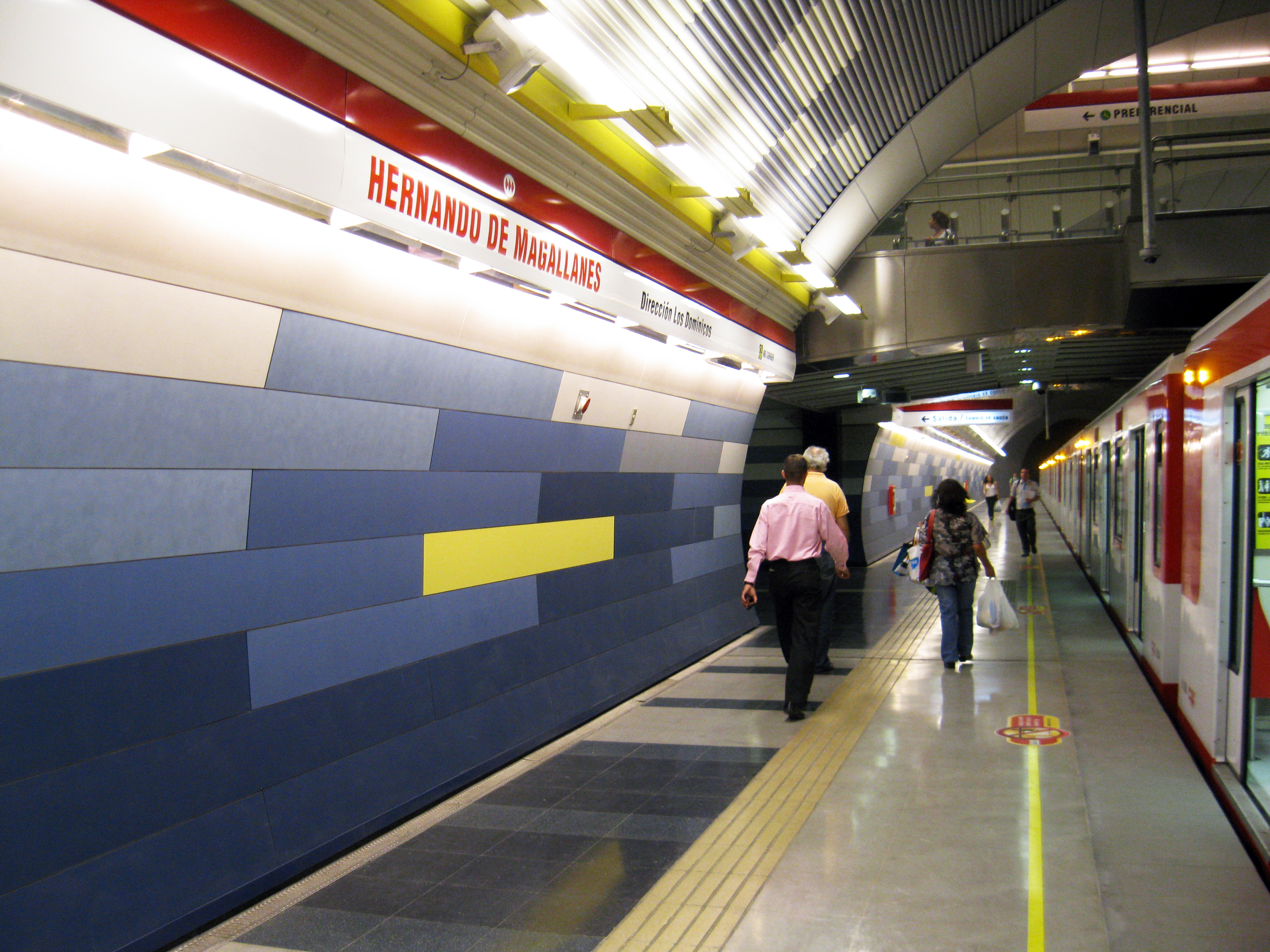

General information
- Location: Apoquindo Avenue / Hernando de Magallanes Street
- Coordinates: 33°24′29.58″S 70°33′22.00″W
- System: Santiago rapid transit
- Line: Line 1
- Platforms: 2 side platforms
- Tracks: 2
- Connections: Transantiago buses

Construction
- Accessible: yes

History
- Opened: January 7, 2010

Services
| Preceding station | Santiago Metro | Following station |
|---|---|---|
| Manquehue towards San Pablo | Line 1 | Los Dominicos Terminus |
Location

Hernando de Magallanes is an underground metro station on the Line 1 of the Santiago Metro, in Santiago, Chile. The station entrance kiosk is on Monsignor Manuel Larraín Square, which was altered due to the construction of the station.

The station was opened on 7 January 2010 as part of the extension of the line from Escuela Militar to Los Dominicos,
