= Santiago Metro Line 7 =

Under-planning Santiago Metro line

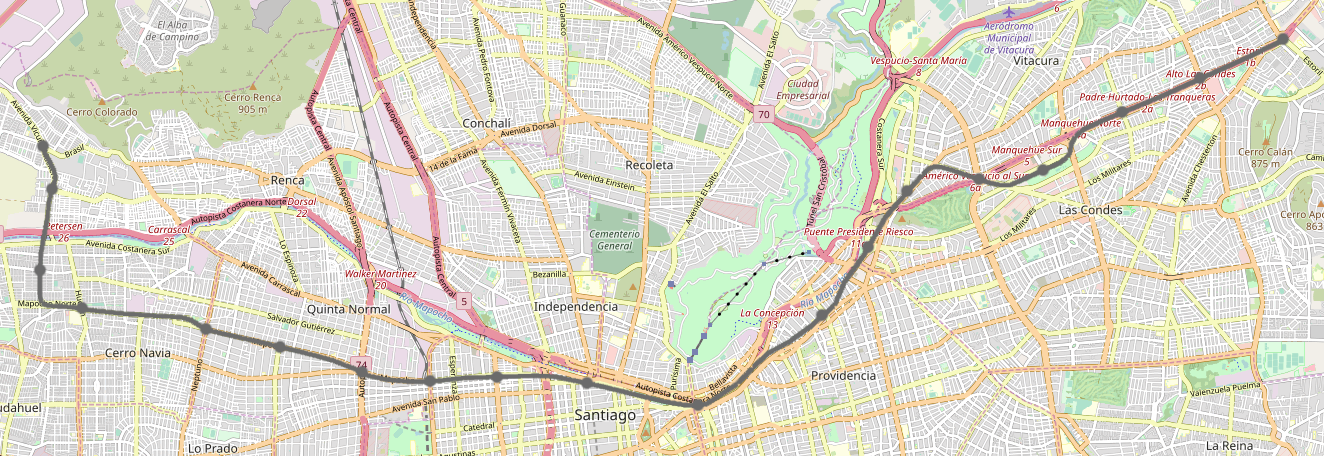
- Map of Line 7

Overview
- Status: Under construction
- Owner: Empresa de Transporte de Pasajeros Metro S.A.
- Locale: Santiago
- Termini: Brasil; Estoril
- Stations: 19

Service
- Type: Rapid transit
- System: Santiago Metro, Transantiago
- Services: 1
- Operator: Empresa de Transporte de Pasajeros Metro S.A.

History
- Planned opening: 2028; 2 years' time

Technical
- Line length: 24.8 km (15.4 mi)
- Character: Underground
- Electrification: 1,500 V DC overhead catenary

Line 7 is a new rapid transit line due to open on the Santiago Metro, in 2028. Intended to relieve the busy Line 1, the Line 7 will start in Renca in the northwest, passing through the city center, before ending in the borders of Las Condes and Vitacura in the northeast. Expected to be finished by 2028, it will add 19 new stations and 24.8 km (15.4 mi) of track to the system. Its distinctive color on the network line map is gray. Cost of construction has been set at US$2.5 billion.

== Route ==
For its most part, it will run parallel to Line 1, with the idea of decongesting it and reducing its flow by approximately 10,000 passengers. The line will have transfers with lines 1, 2, 3 and 5, and will directly benefit the communes of Renca, Cerro Navia, Quinta Normal, Santiago, Providencia, Las Condes and Vitacura; of these, Renca, Cerro Navia and Vitacura will have access to the metro for the first time. Its construction was announced by Michelle Bachelet during the Presidency Speech on June 1, 2017.

According to the original project, it will start at the intersection of the avenues Brazil with Vicuña Mackenna in Renca, from where it will start to the south, following the route of the last street it will cross the Mapocho river at the height of the Resbalón bridge in Cerro Navia, and from there it will continue by Rolando Petersen to the south, until its intersection with Mapocho Avenue; here it will go towards the east following this same route, it will cross the communes of Cerro Navia and Quinta Normal, connecting perpendicularly lines 2 and 3 in Puente Cal y Canto, to continue under the park corridor that borders the Mapocho (Forestal and Balmaceda); in this route it will combine with lines 5 and 1 at Baquedano. After passing through the Balmaceda park following Andrés Bello, it will continue to connect with the Line 1 at Pedro de Valdivia, then head through the Southern border of Vitacura until Alonso de Córdova, where it will connect with Presidente Kennedy to finish its route in the junction of Presidente Kennedy with Estoril in Las Condes and Vitacura.

Among the landmarks of Santiago that will have access to the metro for this new line are the new Felix Bulnes Hospital, the El Cerro Park, the Casona Dubois Cultural Center, the Benjamín Franklin Industrial High School, the Padre Renato Poblete river park, the Los Reyes Park, Central markets, Tirso de Molina and Vega Central, Plaza Baquedano, Sanhattan neighborhood, Bicentennial park, Parque Arauco, the Alto Las Condes shopping center and Las Condes and Tabancura clinics.

Chilean transport experts have proposed that the line be modified to serve the city's international airport by running through San Daniel, Rio Itata and Armando Cortínez Oriente avenues in Pudahuel, passing through the Enea business park and with 22 stations, adding four and removing the three most western of the project. This idea was discarded, as President Gabriel Boric announced in 2025 a new independent Line A that will instead connect Line 7 with the airport

On December 22, 2017, the newspaper El Mercurio published a report that indicated that the route of the line was modified, so it will not circulate along Andrés Bello Avenue, but will go parallel to Line 1 through Providencia Avenue, eliminating a planned transfer in Salvador and transferring it to Pedro de Valdivia, to then continue with its original layout in Isidora Goyenechea (where it will combine with Line 6 in a station with the same name), and a section of the route in the sector of Kennedy Avenue will be diverted by Cerro Colorado. Along with this it was announced that the line will be inaugurated in 2027.

The groundbreaking ceremony, marking the start of construction, was held by President Sebastián Piñera on February 17, 2022.

The first 6.6 kilometers of the western section of Line 7 were to be made by a 105-meter long drilling machine named "La Matucana". However, after only 4 months and 1.5 kilometers drilled, the machine stop working, after a problem with its head rendered it useless. This along with other delays related to archaeological findings delayed the opening of Line 7 to at least December 2028

== Social benefits ==
According to estimates of the Ministry of Transport, the time savings for people traveling from Renca to Vitacura will be 1 hour per trip, that is, 2 per day, equivalent to 21 days per year. There will be 1945 urban hectares (greater than the area of Providencia) at a distance of less than 600 meters (2,000 ft) from any station on the line, so the number of people who can access a station on foot is estimated at 322 979 inhabitants, considering the estimated densification. It also helps to distribute more evenly the inflow between the different metro lines, thanks to its route and transfer stations.

In addition to the logical benefits that it will bring in terms of transfer times, Line 7 stands out for its contribution to the socio-economic and geographical integration of the city, since it connects the most neglected and deteriorated parts in terms of urban investment, infrastructure and connection, as it is the northwest of Santiago, with the center and northeast of the city, where the commerce and the jobs prevail. It will also generate greater densification of housing and population in the areas surrounding the stations, promoting the private investment of real estate, as well as trade and services, in poor areas of the city. It will discourage the use of cars in the saturated north-east sector, mitigating vehicular congestion and air pollution.

== Stations ==
Stations running from west to east

Stations (tentative name)	Transfers	Location	Opening	Commune
Brasil		Vicuña Mackenna/Brasil	2028	Renca
José Miguel Infante		Vicuña Mackenna/José Miguel Infante	2028	Renca
Salvador Gutiérrez		Salvador Gutiérrez/Rolando Petersen	2028	Cerro Navia
Huelén		Mapocho/Huelén	2028	Cerro Navia
Cerro Navia		Mapocho/Neptuno	2028	Cerro Navia
Radal		Mapocho/Radal	2028	Quinta Normal
Walker Martínez		Mapocho/Joaquin Walker Martínez	2028	Quinta Normal
Matucana		Mapocho/Matucana	2028	Quinta Normal
Mapocho		Mapocho/Ricardo Cumming	2028	Santiago
Puente Cal y Canto	Santiago Metro Line 2 Santiago Metro Line 3 Santiago Metro Line 9	Balmaceda/Puente	2028	Santiago
Baquedano	Santiago Metro Line 1 Santiago Metro Line 5	Pio Nono/Bellavista	2028	Santiago/Providencia/Recoleta
Pedro de Valdivia	Santiago Metro Line 1	Providencia/Monseñor Sótero Sanz	2028	Providencia
Isidora Goyenechea	Santiago Metro Line 6	Vitacura/Isidora Goyenechea	2028	Las Condes
Vitacura		Vitacura/Las Catalpas	2028	Vitacura
Américo Vespucio		Alonso de Córdova/Américo Vespucio	2028	Vitacura/Las Condes
Parque Araucano		Cerro Colorado/Rosario Norte	2028	Las Condes
Gerónimo de Alderete		Kennedy/Gerónimo de Alderete	2028	Vitacura/Las Condes
Padre Hurtado		Kennedy/Padre Hurtado	2028	Vitacura/Las Condes
Estoril		Kennedy/Estoril	2028	Vitacura/Las Condes
