= Apumanque Mall =

Shopping mall in Las Condes, Santiago, Chile

- Mall Apumanque
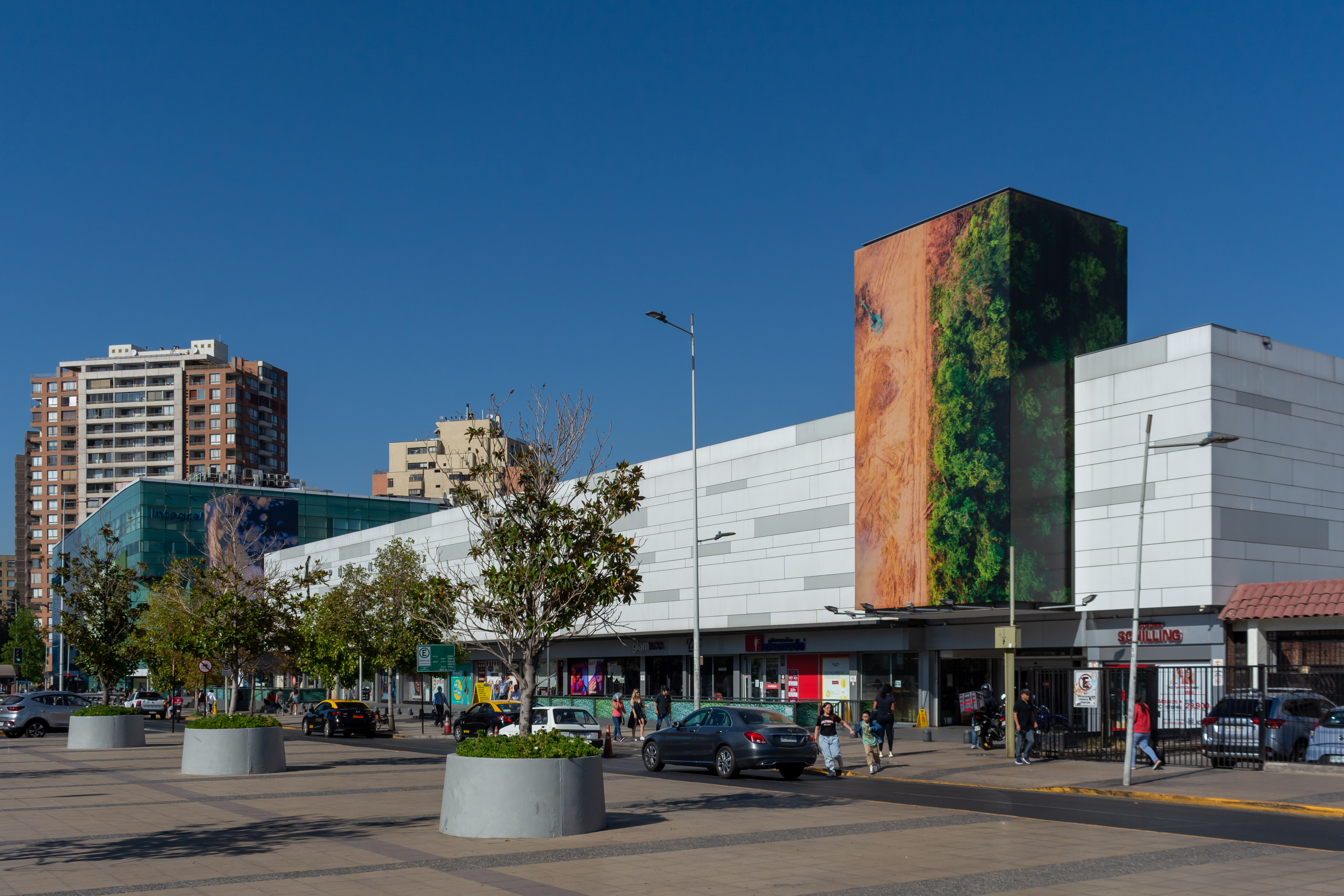
- Location: Las Condes, Chile
- Coordinates: 33°24′35″S 70°34′03″W
- Address: Manquehue Sur Avenue 31
- Opened: 1981
- Renovated: 1994 (interior), 2007 (exterior)
- Floors: 3
- Parking: Covered (third floor)
- Public transit: Manquehue metro station, Santiago Metro
- Website: apumanque.cl

Apumanque Mall (Note: Also known as the Apumanque Cosmocentre (Spanish: Cosmocentro Apumanque).) is a shopping mall located in the Las Condes commune of Santiago, Chile. It was inaugurated in 1981, four months before the Parque Arauco mall. The mall has three floors, the third being a food court.

== History ==
The mall was developed between the late 1970s and early 1980s. The first stage of the mall was inaugurated in November 1981 as the Apumanque Cosmocentre, four months before the Parque Arauco mall, which was being constructed nearby. The second stage was inaugurated a few months later in 1982. When it was completed in 1982, the mall had an area of almost 20,000 square metres (220,000 sq ft) with 964 shops. Prior to the opening of the Apumanque, shopping malls in Chile were predominantly of the caracol format (helical-shaped shopping galleries). In 1982, sculptor Matilde Pérez instaled a kinetic/plastic art installation named Kinetic Frieze, a 70-metre (230 ft) long mural which consisted of 39 steel plates and hundreds of light bulbs which drew sequences of moving light.

In 1986, a bomb was detonated in the mall, killing 27-year-old Iván Parra Roldán and injuring multiple others. The perpetrators have not been identified. In 1992, a large fire took place in the mall, resulting in large damages to the centre but no fatalities.

In 1994, the mall's interior underwent a major renovation, replacing the original floor and the metallic fake sky ceiling. One year later, in 1995, the mall's food court was inaugurated in the third floor, which included 13 restaurants and a game room. In 2007 the mall's facade was remodeled by Felipe Assadi with Trinidad Schonthaler, and the kinetic frieze installation was removed, although it was installed in the University of Talca three years later.

The mall became connected with Line 1 of the Santiago Metro by the Manquehue Station after the line's expansion in 2010. In 2025, the mall began a renovation process aiming to improve the floors, lights, bathrooms, escalators and the food court.
