= Apoquindo massacre =

Massacre in Santiago, Chile

Coordinates: 33.409013°S 70.568102°W

The Apoquindo massacre, also known as the Apoquindo shootings, took place in Santiago, Chile, on October 21, 1993. It resulted in the deaths of eight people during a confrontation between members of the Lautaro Youth Movement guerrilla group and Carabineros de Chile police officers.

The incident began when five Lautaro members robbed a bank on Apoquindo Avenue, killing the building's security guard. Subsequently, the assailants boarded a bus, which was later intercepted by the police. The ensuing shootout resulted in the deaths of seven people, including three Lautaro members, three passengers, and one Carabinero. Furthermore, 12 people were wounded.

== Background ==
Although by 1993 Chile had officially become a democracy, the Chilean military remained highly powerful and the Constitution of Chile ensured the continued influence of General Augusto Pinochet and his military commanders. This prevented President Patricio Aylwin's government from achieving many of the goals it had set out to achieve, such as the restructuring of the Constitutional Court of Chile and the reduction of Pinochet's political power. In spite of the severe limits imposed on Aylwin's government by the Constitution, over four years, it "altered power relations in its favor in the state, in civil society, and in political society." However, organizations including the Movimiento Juvenil Lautaro, the Manuel Rodríguez Patriotic Front and the Movimiento de Izquierda Revolucionaria continued to resist the Chilean government, either through nonviolent underground resistance or through armed resistance.

== The incident ==
On October 21, 1993, five members from the Lautaro Youth Movement carried out a robbery at the O'Higgins Bank branch situated at 6417 Apoquindo Avenue. Survivors stated that the motive behind the robbery was to raise funds for a potential political prisoner rescue. During the incident, they fatally shot the building's security guard.

The perpetrators managed to escape with 4 million pesos in a taxi. A few blocks away from the robbery site, they boarded an intercity bus on route 24 C. Their getaway was interrupted in front of the Apumanque shopping center by a police van from the 17th Police Station of Las Condes. A police subofficer named Dionisio Zapata (46) attempted to apprehend them but was fatally shot by one of the Lautaro members hiding inside the bus. Following this, a standoff developed with a police presence, including a helicopter.

During the exchange of gunfire between the police and the bank robbers on the bus, six people lost their lives: three bus passengers named Gabriela Castillo Díaz (31), Tatiana Inés Navarro Valdés (19), and Marcos Villegas, as well as three robbers, identified as Raúl Humberto González Órdenes (El Gato), Alejandro Soza Durán, and Yuri Uribe Toro. Furthermore, twelve individuals sustained injuries.

The police eventually stormed the bus, dragging both the dead and survivors. They subjected the survivors to brutal beatings, resulting in fractures, and even threatened them with death in the middle of the street. At the scene, two police officers were detained due to the reckless use of their service weapons. Ballistic experts confirmed that the bus, with over 20 passengers on board, suffered 162 bullet impacts, as documented in the ballistic reports for the case.

== Impact of events ==
The government of the time, led by President Patricio Aylwin, endorsed the actions of the police. Senator Sergio Onofre Jarpa, a former Interior Minister under Pinochet, stated, "It's like a war. They declared it, and we must confront them at any cost."

== Trial ==
The two surviving Lautaro members, Álvaro González and Oriana Alcayaga, were each sentenced to 15 years for terrorist association and 6 years for illegal possession of weapons. González was also sentenced to an additional 20 years for the assault on a Carabineros officer resulting in death. Additionally, in January 2002, a military court sentenced both González and Alcayaga to 40 years of effective life imprisonment. Then, in December 2002, it reduced their sentences to 17 and 12 years, respectively. The Carabineros involved in the shooting received sentences of 541 and 240 days of suspended imprisonment.
