= Manquehue metro station =

Santiago metro station

Manquehue
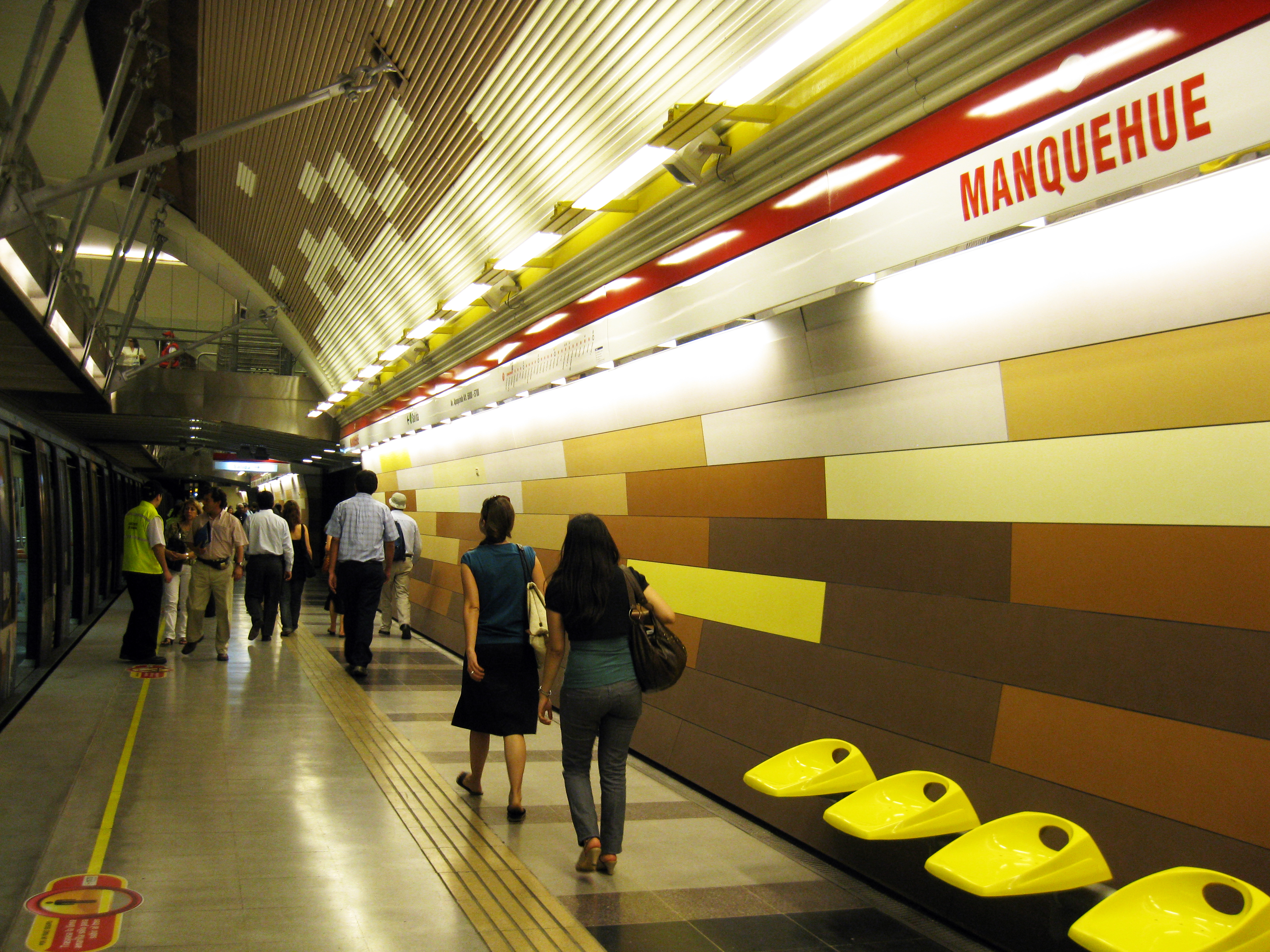

General information
- Location: Apoquindo Avenue / Manquehue Avenue
- Coordinates: 33°24′31.62″S 70°34′1.86″W
- System: Santiago rapid transit
- Line: Line 1
- Platforms: 2 side platforms
- Tracks: 2
- Connections: Transantiago buses

Construction
- Accessible: yes

History
- Opened: January 7, 2010

Services
Preceding station	Santiago Metro	Following station
Escuela Militar towards San Pablo	Line 1	Hernando de Magallanes towards Los Dominicos
Location

Manquehue is an underground metro station on the Line 1 of the Santiago Metro, in Santiago, Chile. It is part of the 3.8 kilometres (2.4 mi) eastern extension of the Line 1. The station was opened on 7 January 2010 as part of the extension of the line from Escuela Militar to Los Dominicos,

The station consists of a platform tunnel and three transepts containing a mezzanine each, which are connected by a bridge that is suspended from the tunnel ceiling by tie rods. Each mezzanine is accessed via two entrances on both sides of Apoquindo Avenue.
