= MJL =

MJL can refer to:

- mjl, the ISO 639-3 code for the Mandeali language
- Movimiento Juvenil Lautaro, the Lautaro Youth Movement
