= Salvador metro station =

Santiago metro station

Salvador
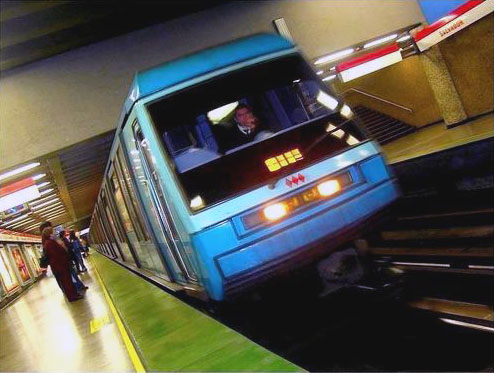

General information
- Location: Providencia Avenue / Eliodoro Yáñez Avenue
- Coordinates: 33°25′57.56″S 70°37′33.91″W
- System: Santiago rapid transit
- Line: Line 1
- Platforms: 2 side platforms
- Tracks: 2
- Connections: Transantiago buses

Construction
- Accessible: yes

History
- Opened: March 31, 1977

Services
Preceding station	Santiago Metro	Following station
Baquedano towards San Pablo	Line 1	Manuel Montt towards Los Dominicos
Location

Salvador is an underground metro station on the Line 1 of the Santiago Metro, in Santiago, Chile. The station is located beneath the Balmaceda Park and close to Salvador Avenue, which is named for the Hospital del Salvador. The station was opened on 31 March 1977 as the eastern terminus of the extension of the line from La Moneda. On 22 August 1980 the line was extended further east to Escuela Militar.
