= Apoquindo Avenue =

Avenue in Santiago, Chile

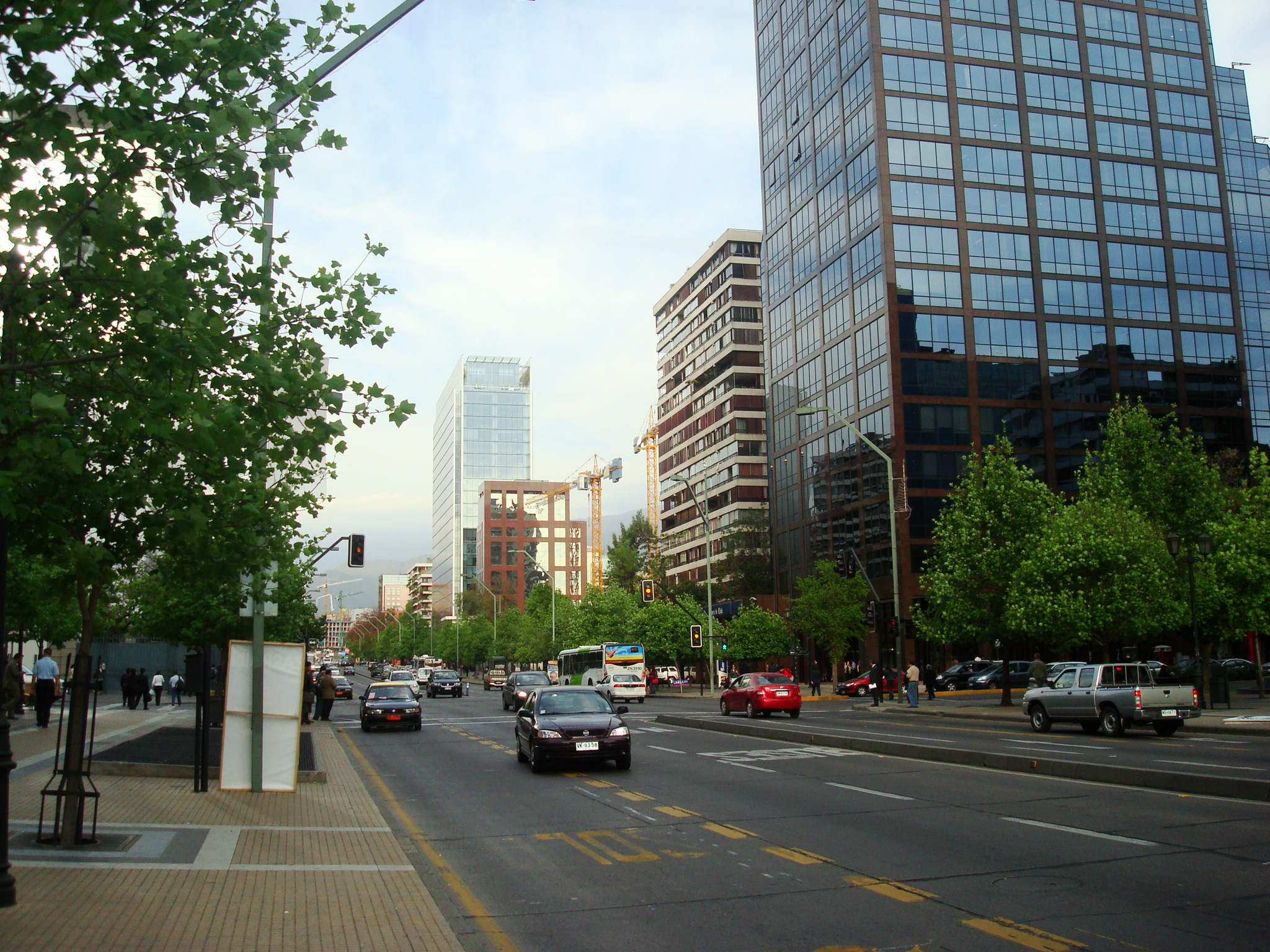
Looking east

Apoquindo Avenue is a major thoroughfare in Santiago, Chile. It extends 6.17 km (3.83 mi) through the commune of Las Condes.

== Description ==
Apoquindo Avenue originates immediately east of Tobalaba Avenue. The main stretch of this street runs eastward from the eastern end of Providencia Avenue at Canal San Carlos to Américo Vespucio Avenue, passing on the way through El Golf neighborhood. Glass fronted buildings rise on both sides of the avenue along this section. It has three lanes each way and wide sidewalks.

West of Manquehue Avenue, Las Condes Avenue branches off from Apoquindo. The Church of San Vicente Ferrer marks the terminus of the avenue.

== Santiago Metro ==
The eastern portion of the Line 1 of the Santiago Metro runs under Apoquindo Avenue, stopping at Tobalaba, El Golf, Alcántara, Escuela Militar, Manquehue, Hernando de Magallanes and Los Dominicos stations.

== See also ==
- Apoquindo
- Apoquindo massacre
