= Lautaro Youth Movement =

MAPU Lautaro Movimiento Juvenil Lautaro
- Leader: Guillermo Ossandón
- Founded: 1982
- Dissolved: 1994
- Preceded by: Popular Unitary Action Movement
- Ideology: Communism; Marxism–Leninism; Revolutionary socialism
- Political position: Far-left
- Colours: Green, Red

Party flag

The Lautaro Youth Movement (Spanish: Movimiento Juvenil Lautaro, or MJL) also known as MAPU Lautaro was a left-wing armed organization in Chile, founded in 1982 by Guillermo Ossandón.

== History ==
During the Military dictatorship in Chile some members of the Popular Unitary Action Movement formed the Movimiento Juvenil Lautaro to pursue guerrilla warfare. The MJL was named after Lautaro, leader of the indigenous resistance in Chile.

MAPU Lautaro continued its armed struggle even after the return of democracy to Chile and democratic elections.

== See also ==
- Armed resistance in Chile (1973–90)
- Apoquindo massacre
