= Escuela Militar metro station =

Santiago metro station

Escuela Militar
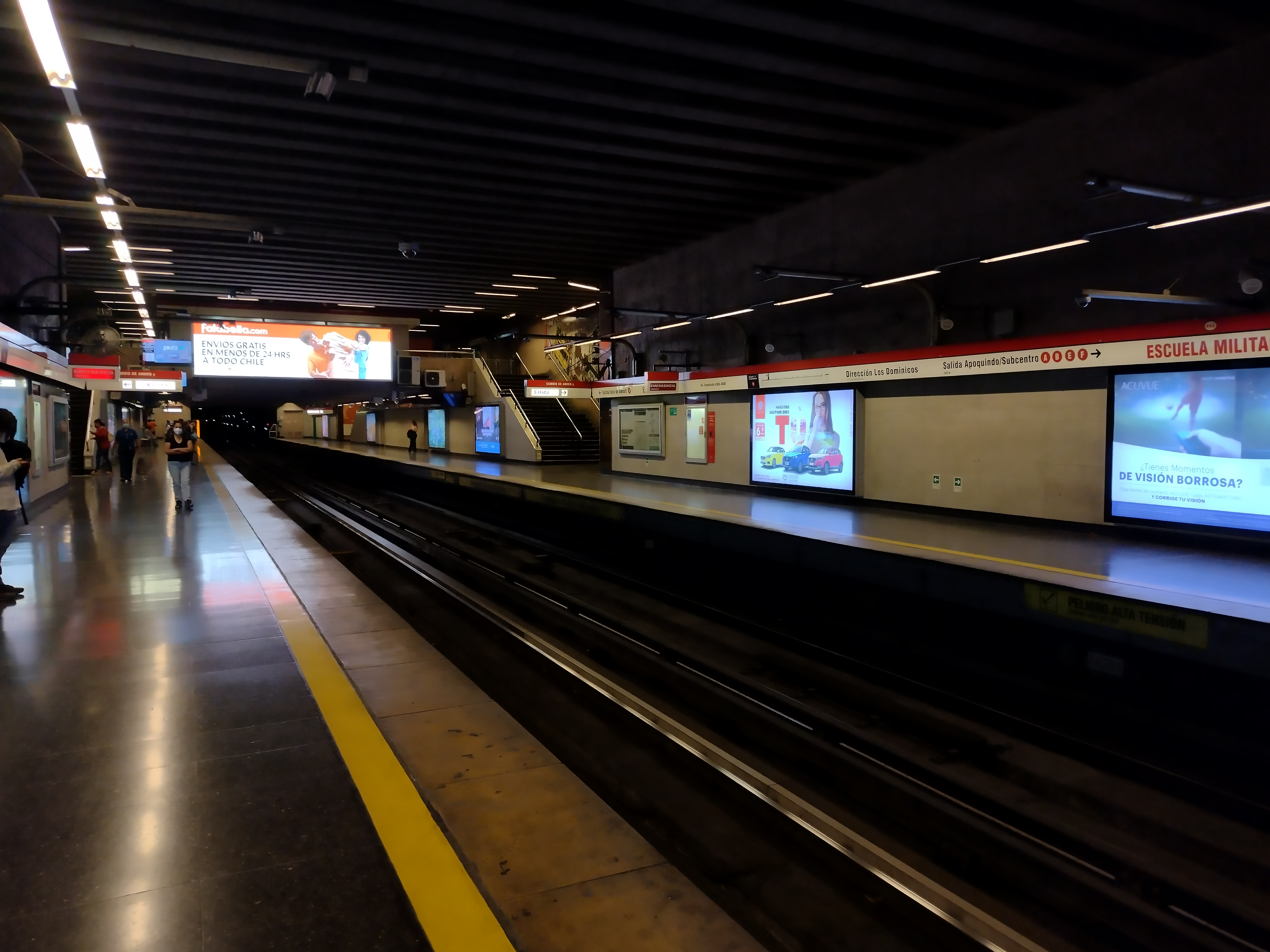

General information
- Location: Apoquindo Avenue / Américo Vespucio Avenue
- Coordinates: 33°24′51.36″S 70°35′4.74″W
- System: Santiago rapid transit
- Line: Line 1
- Platforms: 2 side platforms
- Tracks: 2
- Connections: Transantiago buses

Construction
- Accessible: yes

History
- Opened: August 31, 1980

Services
Preceding station	Santiago Metro	Following station
Alcántara towards San Pablo	Line 1	Manquehue towards Los Dominicos
Location

Escuela Militar is an underground metro station on the Line 1 of the Santiago Metro, in Santiago, Chile. It is located beneath the cloverleaf-like interchange of Apoquindo Avenue and Américo Vespucio Avenue. The station was opened on 22 August 1980 as part of the extension of the line from Salvador to Escuela Militar. It remained the eastern terminus of the Line 1 until 7 January 2010, when the line was extended to Los Dominicos, and is named for the nearby Escuela Militar del Libertador Bernardo O'Higgins.

== 2014 bombing ==
On September 8, 2014, at 14:00 an improvised explosive device hidden inside of a trash can went off, injuring 14 people. The perpetrator was later arrested and sentenced to 23 years' imprisonment.
