= Cerro Navia =

Commune in Santiago Metropolitan Region, Chile

- Commune
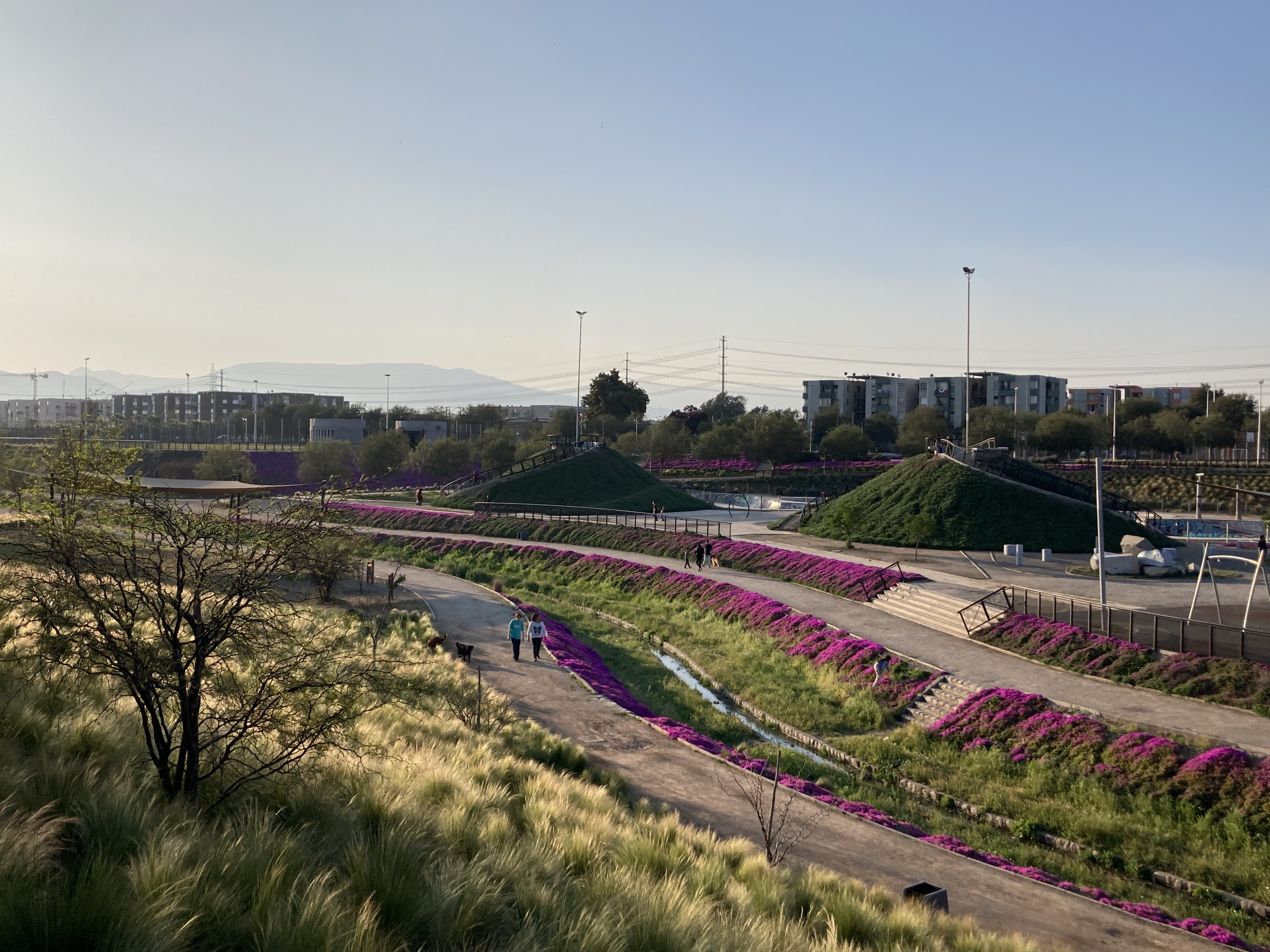
- La Hondonada Park

- Flag Coat of arms Map of Cerro Navia within Greater Santiago Location in Chile
- Coordinates (city): 33°25′12″S 70°44′00″W
- Country: Chile
- Region: Santiago Metropolitan Region
- Province: Santiago
- Founded: 17 March 1981

Government
  - Type: Municipality
  - Alcalde: Mauro Tamayo Rozas (Ind.)

Area
  - Total: 11.1 km^{2} (4.3 sq mi)

Population (2024)
  - Total: 127,250
  - Density: 11,500/km^{2} (29,700/sq mi)
  - Urban: 127,250
  - Rural: 0
- Time zone: UTC-4 (CLT)
  - Summer (DST): UTC-3 (CLST)
- Area code: 56 +
- Website: Municipality of Cerro Navia

Cerro Navia (Spanish for "Navia Hill") is a commune in the Santiago Province of the Santiago Metropolitan Region in Chile. It has 127,250 inhabitants.

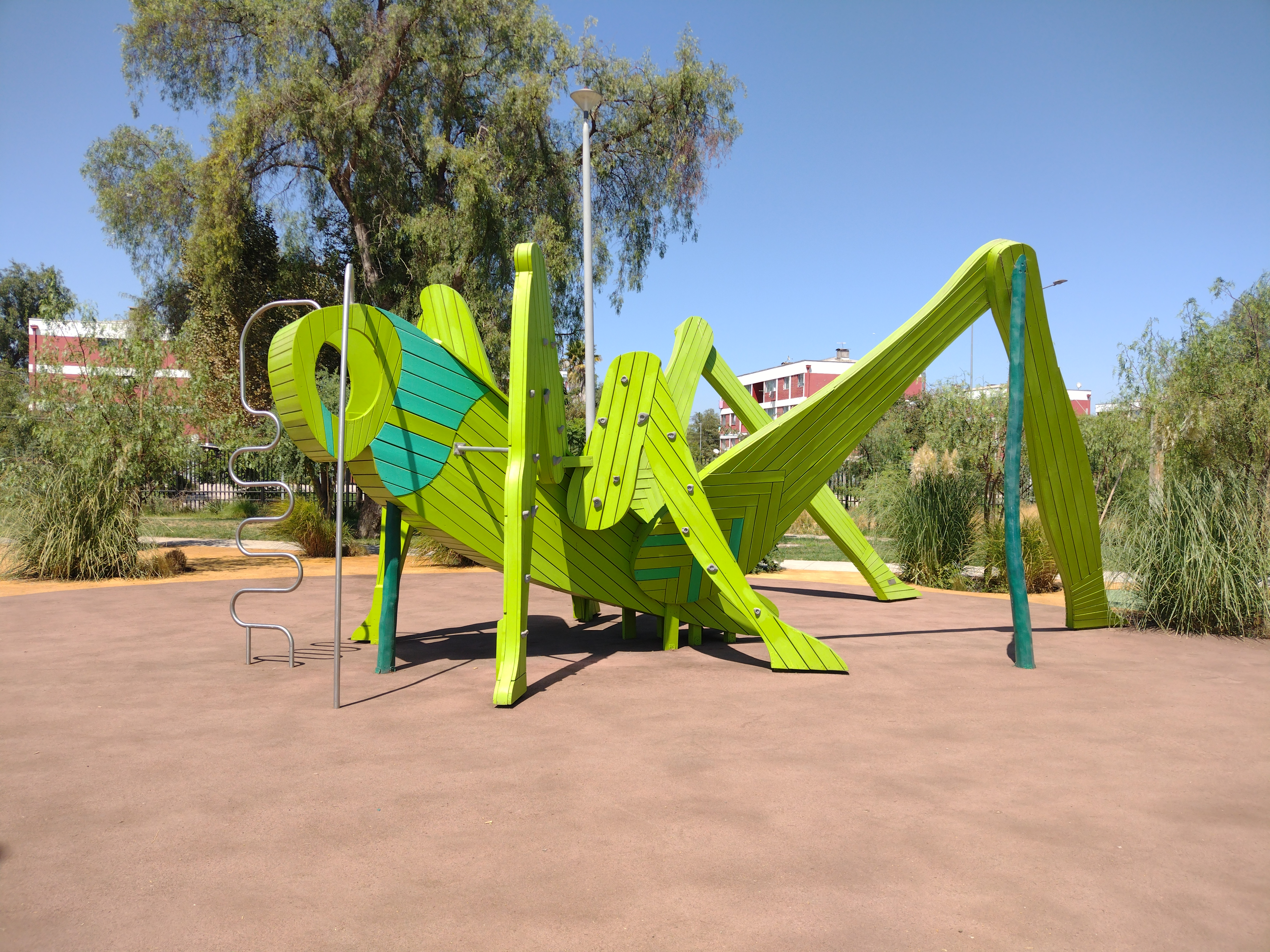
Mapocho Río Park

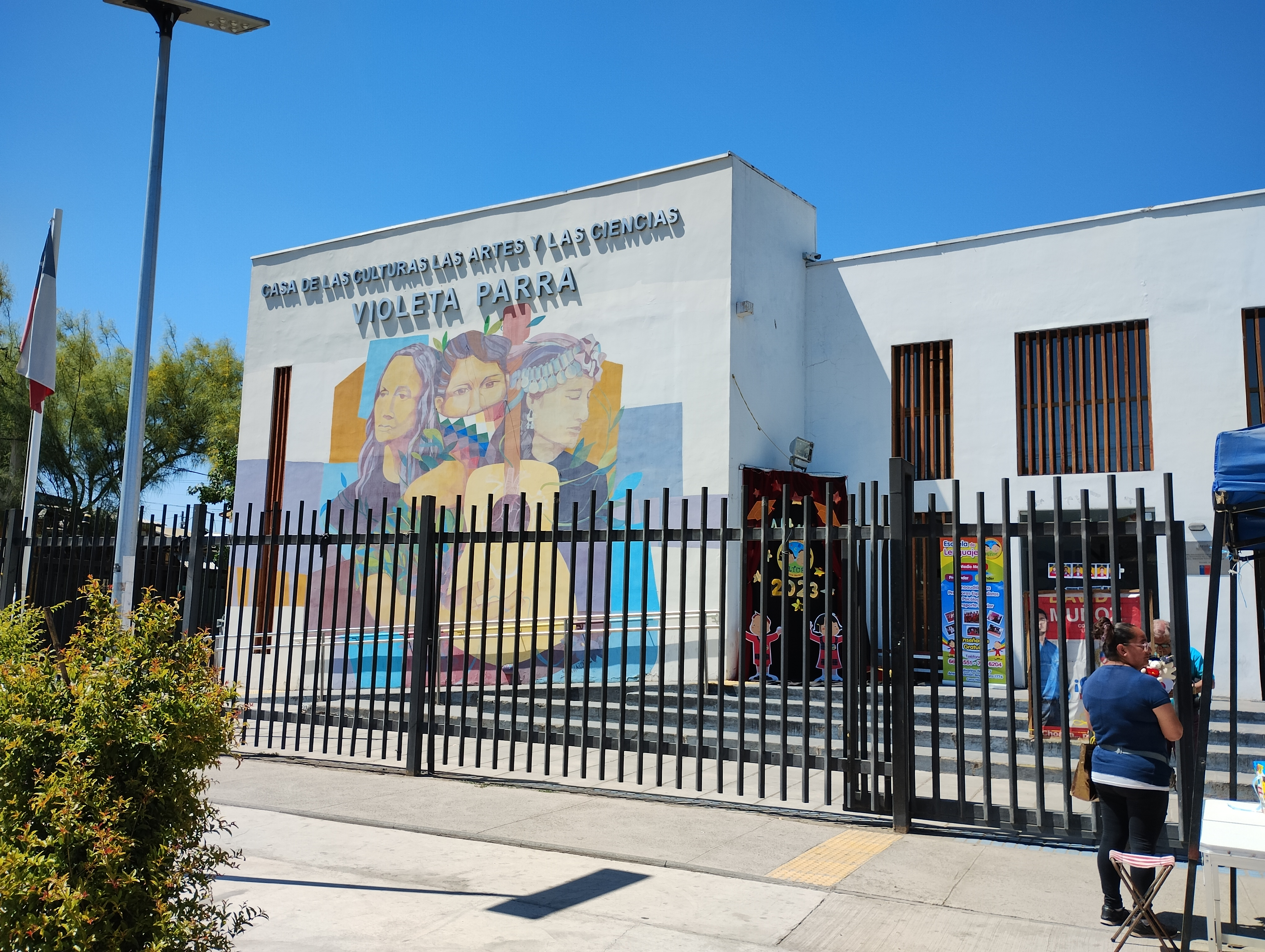
Casa de las Culturas, las Artes y las Ciencias Violeta Parra

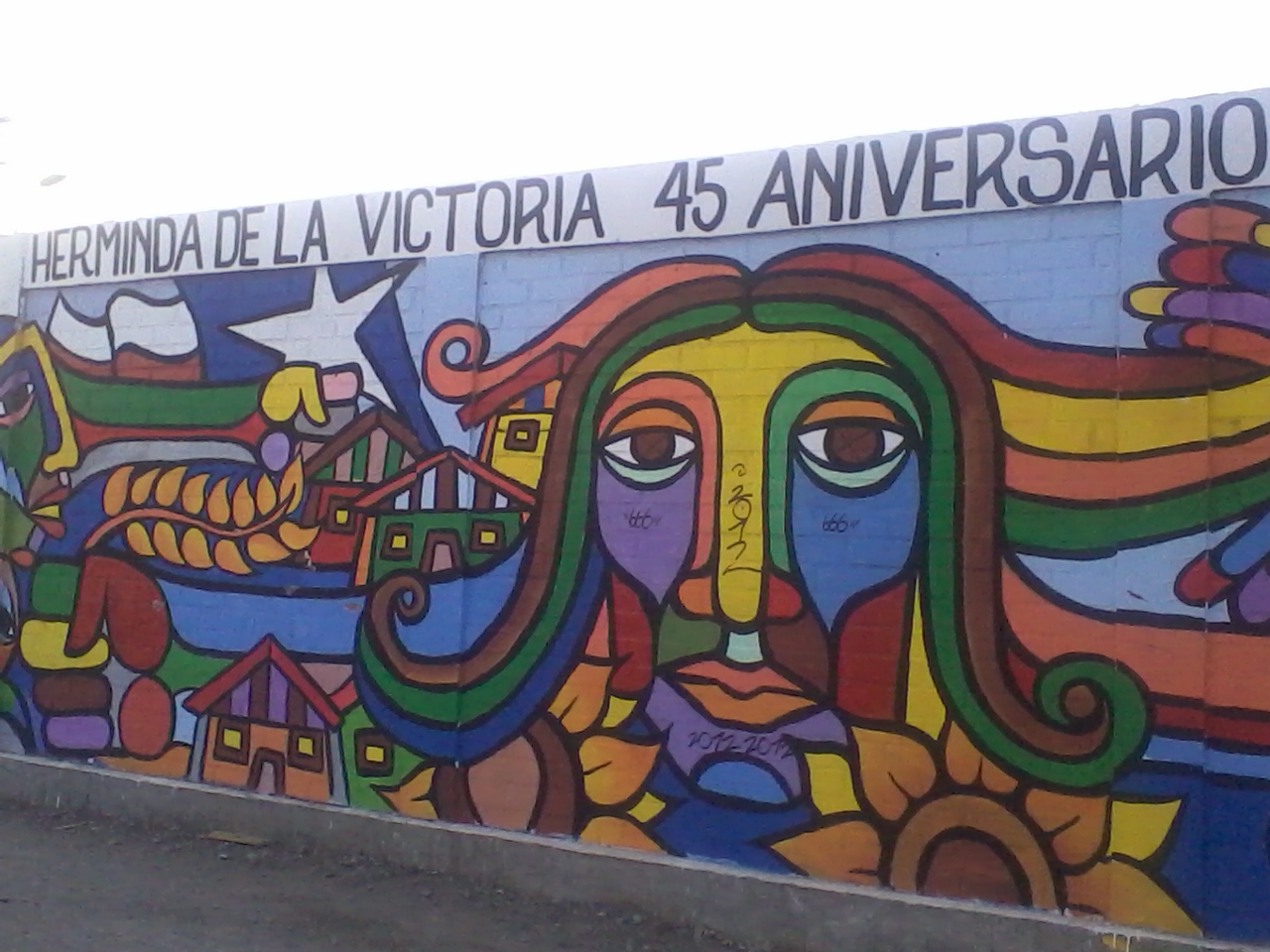
Herminda de la Victoria village, 45th anniversary mural

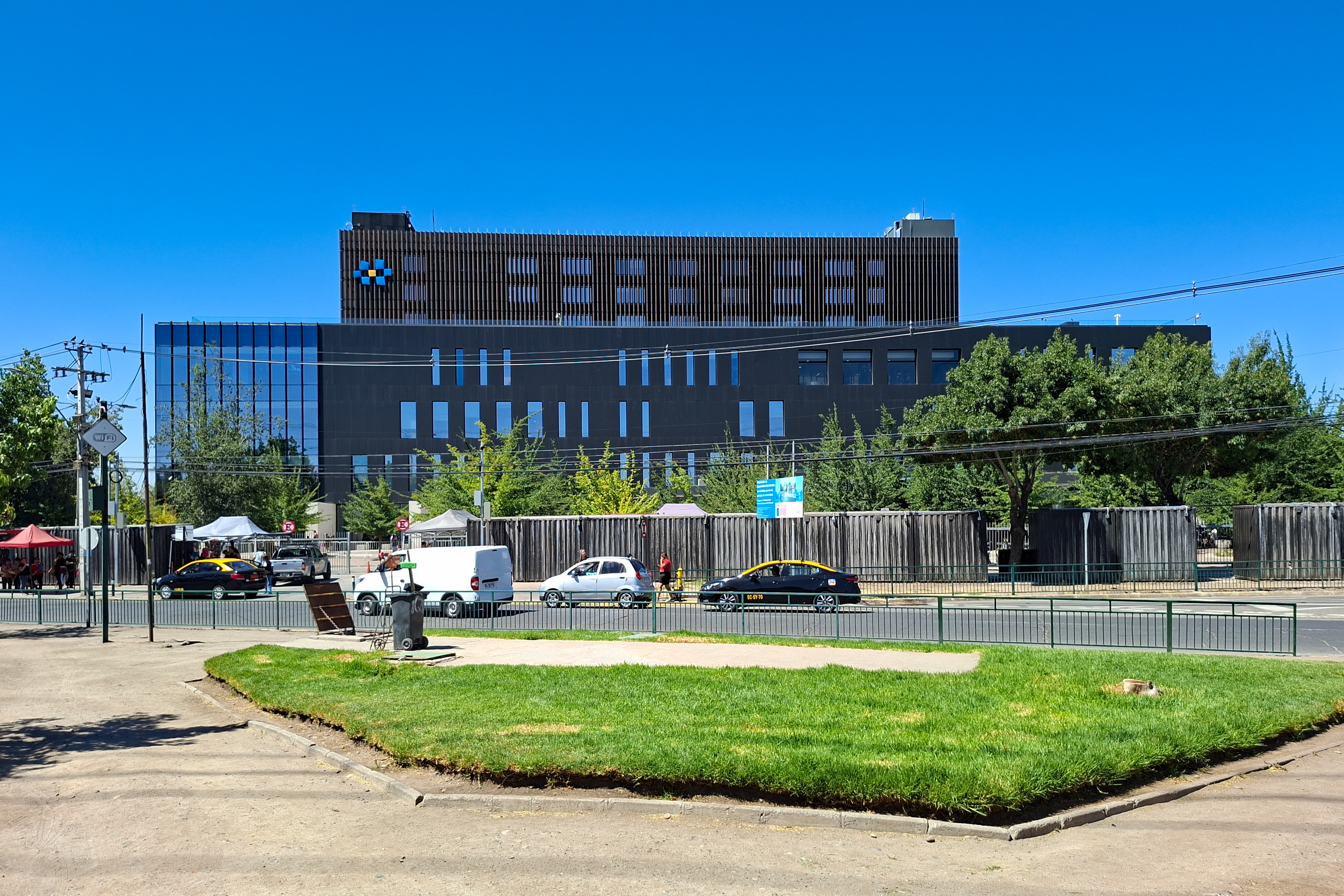
Félix Bulnes Hospital

== History ==
Officially established on March 17, 1981, it wasn't until December 1984 that Cerro Navia became its own commune, taking over much of Pudahuel, part of Quinta Normal, and the old commune of Las Barrancas.

== Demographics ==
As of the 2024 census, the population is 127,250, of which 49.0% are male and 51.0% are female. People under 15 years old make up 17.6% of the population, and people over 65 years old make up 14.7%. 100% of the population is urban.

Historical population
Year	Pop.	±% p.a.
1970	83,755	—
1982	137,777	+4.24%
1992	155,735	+1.23%
2002	148,312	−0.49%
2017	132,622	−0.74%
2024	127,250	−0.59%
Source: INE, Memoria Chilena

- Average annual household income: US$23,778 (PPP, 2006)
- Population below poverty line: 17.5% (2006)
- Regional quality of life index: 71.33, mid-low, 40 out of 52 (2005)
- Human Development Index: 0.683, 165 out of 341 (2003)

=== Immigration ===
As of the 2024 census, immigrants make up 9.9% of the population - 8.2% are from South America, 1.6% from North America, 0.03% from Europe, 0.03% from Asia, 0.002% from Africa, and 0.002% from Oceania.

== Administration ==
As a commune, Cerro Navia is a third-level administrative division of Chile administered by a municipal council, headed by an alcalde who is directly elected every four years. The 2024-2028 alcalde is Mauro Tamayo Rozas (Ind), who has held the position since 2016. The communal council has the following members:

- Zaida Inostroza Valenzuela (PCCh)
- Mario Ferrada Leiva (PCCh)
- Sebastián Caiceo Bacon (FA)
- David Urbina Huerta (Ind/FA)
- Danae Vera Calderón (RN)
- Frank Lobos Acuña (Ind/RN)
- Israel Alberti Garrido (PS)
- Luis Beltrán Manríquez (REP)

Within the electoral divisions of Chile, Cerro Navia is represented in the Chamber of Deputies by Nicolás Monckeberg (RN) and Cristina Girardi (PPD) as part of the 18th electoral district, (together with Quinta Normal and Lo Prado). The commune is represented in the Senate by Guido Girardi Lavín (PPD) and Jovino Novoa Vásquez (UDI) as part of the 7th senatorial constituency (Santiago-West).

== Awards ==
In 2020, the Municipality of Cerro Navia launched Plan 80, a person-centred monitoring and support model that won the Zero Project Award in 2023 for its innovative and scalable approach. The programme, aimed at people over 80 with and without disabilities, offers personalized follow-up consultations to assess a wide range of needs, including assistive devices, healthcare, medication, hygiene, and food. These services are then delivered directly to beneficiaries' homes. By 2021, more than 3,700 people were benefiting from the programme.
