= La Moneda metro station =

Santiago metro station

La Moneda
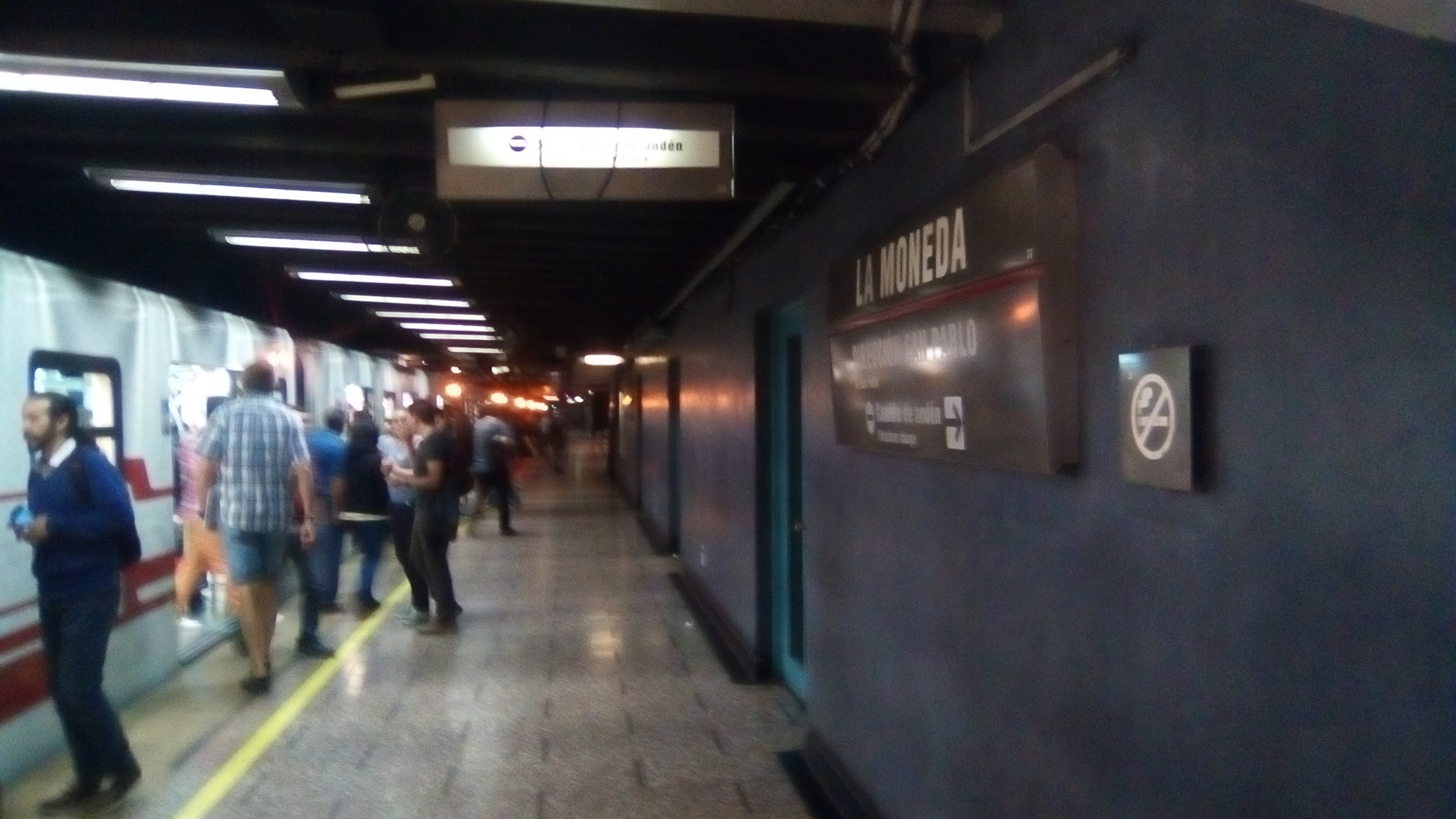

General information
- Location: Alameda / Amunátegui Street
- Coordinates: 33°26′42.1″S 70°39′20.4″W
- System: Santiago rapid transit
- Line: Line 1
- Platforms: 2 side platforms
- Tracks: 2
- Connections: Transantiago buses

History
- Opened: September 15, 1975

Services
Preceding station	Santiago Metro	Following station
Los Héroes towards San Pablo	Line 1	Universidad de Chile towards Los Dominicos
Location

La Moneda is a station on the Santiago Metro in Santiago, Chile. It is underground, between the stations Los Héroes and Universidad de Chile on the same line. It is located on the Avenida Libertador General Bernardo O'Higgins, in the commune of Santiago. The station was opened on 15 September 1975 as the eastern terminus of the inaugural section of the line between San Pablo and La Moneda. On 31 March 1977 the line was extended to Salvador.

It is named for the nearby Palacio de La Moneda.
