= Lo Prado =

- Commune
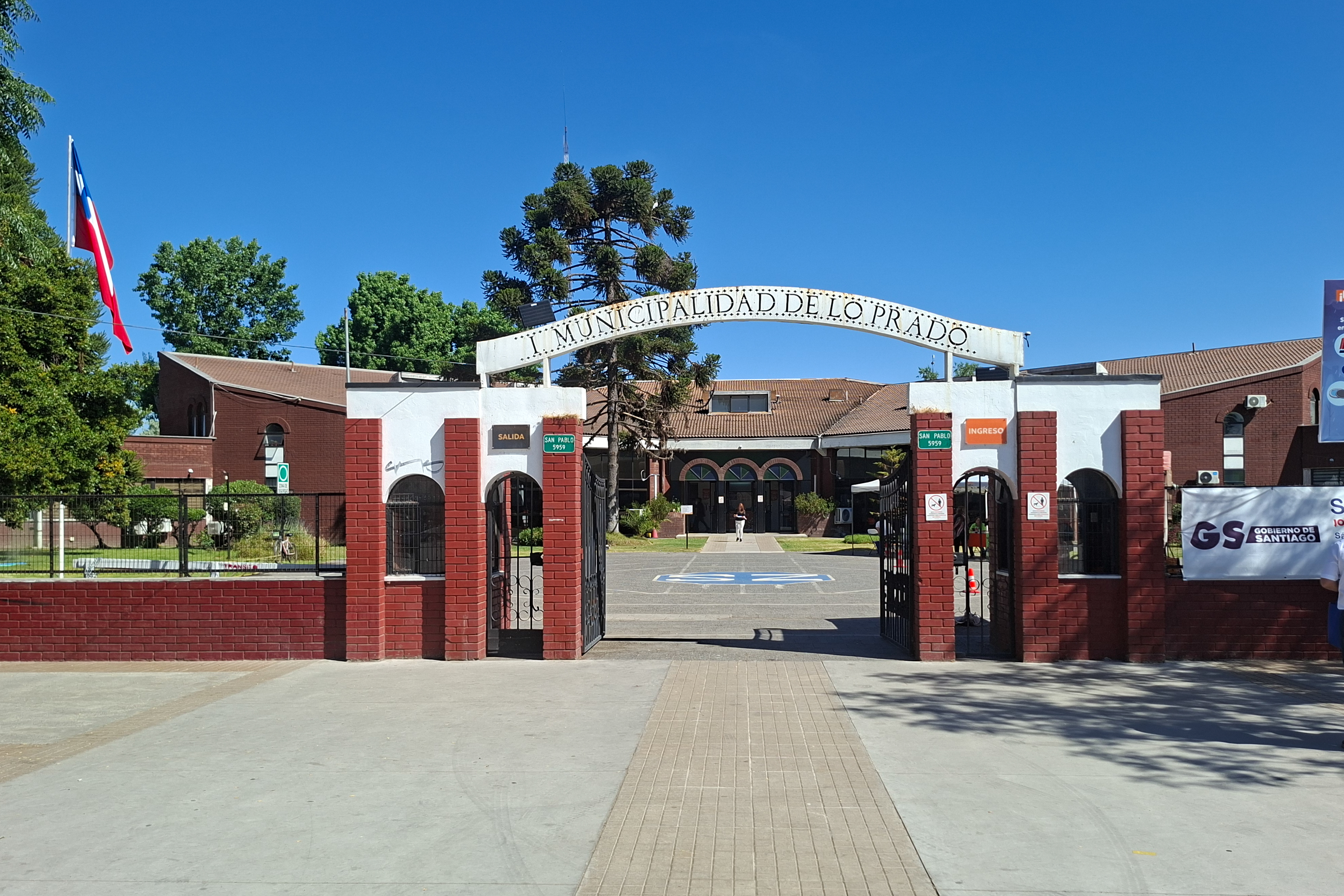
- City Hall

- Flag Coat of arms Location of Lo Prado within Greater Santiago Location in Chile
- Coordinates (city): 33°27′S 70°43.5′W
- Country: Chile
- Region: Santiago Metropolitan
- Province: Santiago
- Established: 4 December 1984

Government
  - Type: Municipality
  - Alcalde: Maximiliano Ríos Galleguillos (PPD)

Area
  - Total: 6.7 km^{2} (2.6 sq mi)

Population (2024)
  - Total: 91,290
  - Density: 14,000/km^{2} (35,000/sq mi)
- Time zone: UTC-4 (CLT)
  - Summer (DST): UTC-3 (CLST)
- Area code: 56 +
- Website: Municipality of Lo Prado

Lo Prado (Spanish pronunciation: [lo ˈpɾaðo]) is a commune of Santiago, in the Santiago Province in the Santiago Metropolitan Region in Chile. The commune borders Cerro Navia to its north, Quinta Normal to its northeast, Estación Central to its southeast and Pudahuel to its west. It has 91,290 inhabitants.

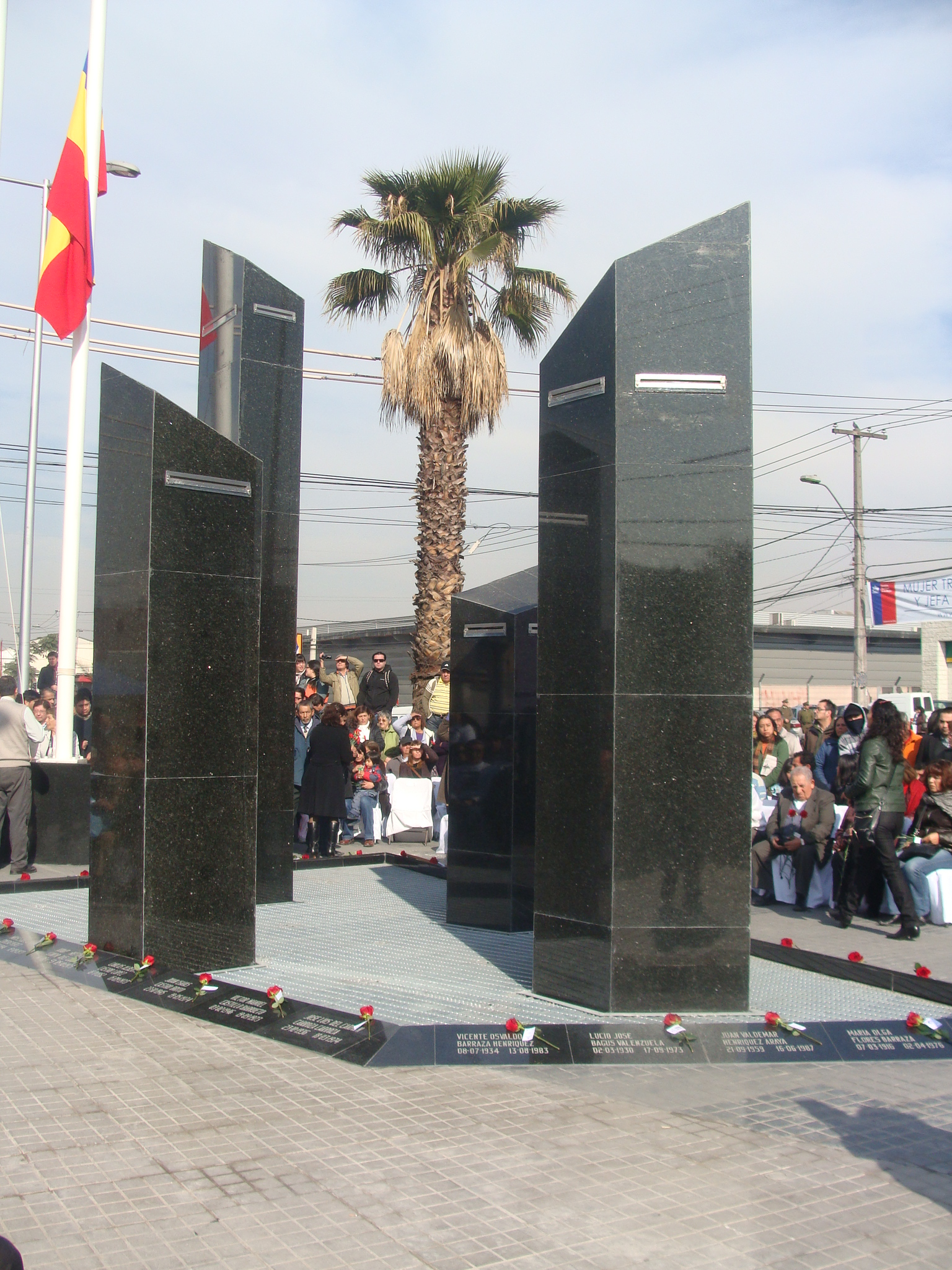
Human Rights memorial

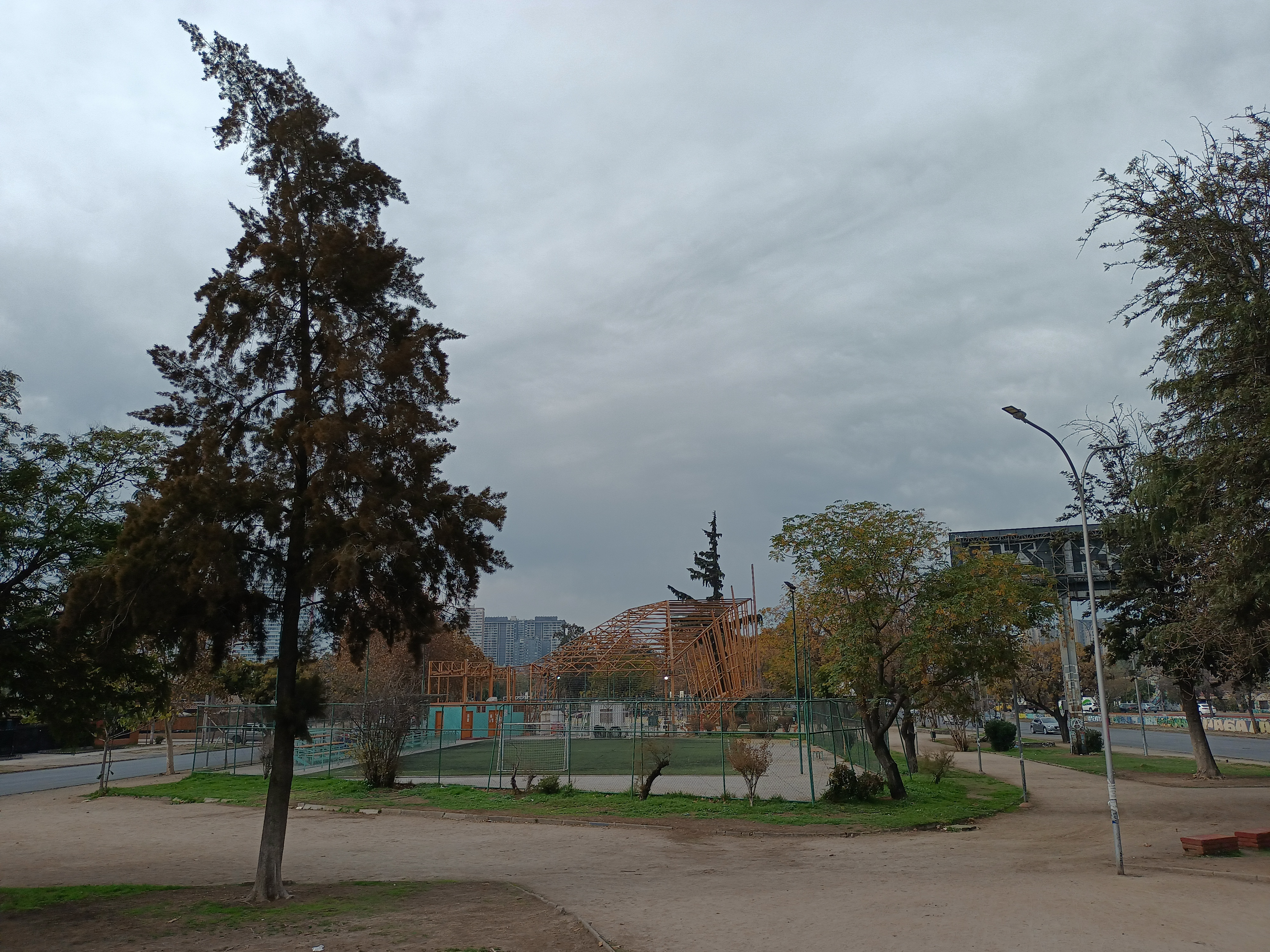
Coronel Bueras Park

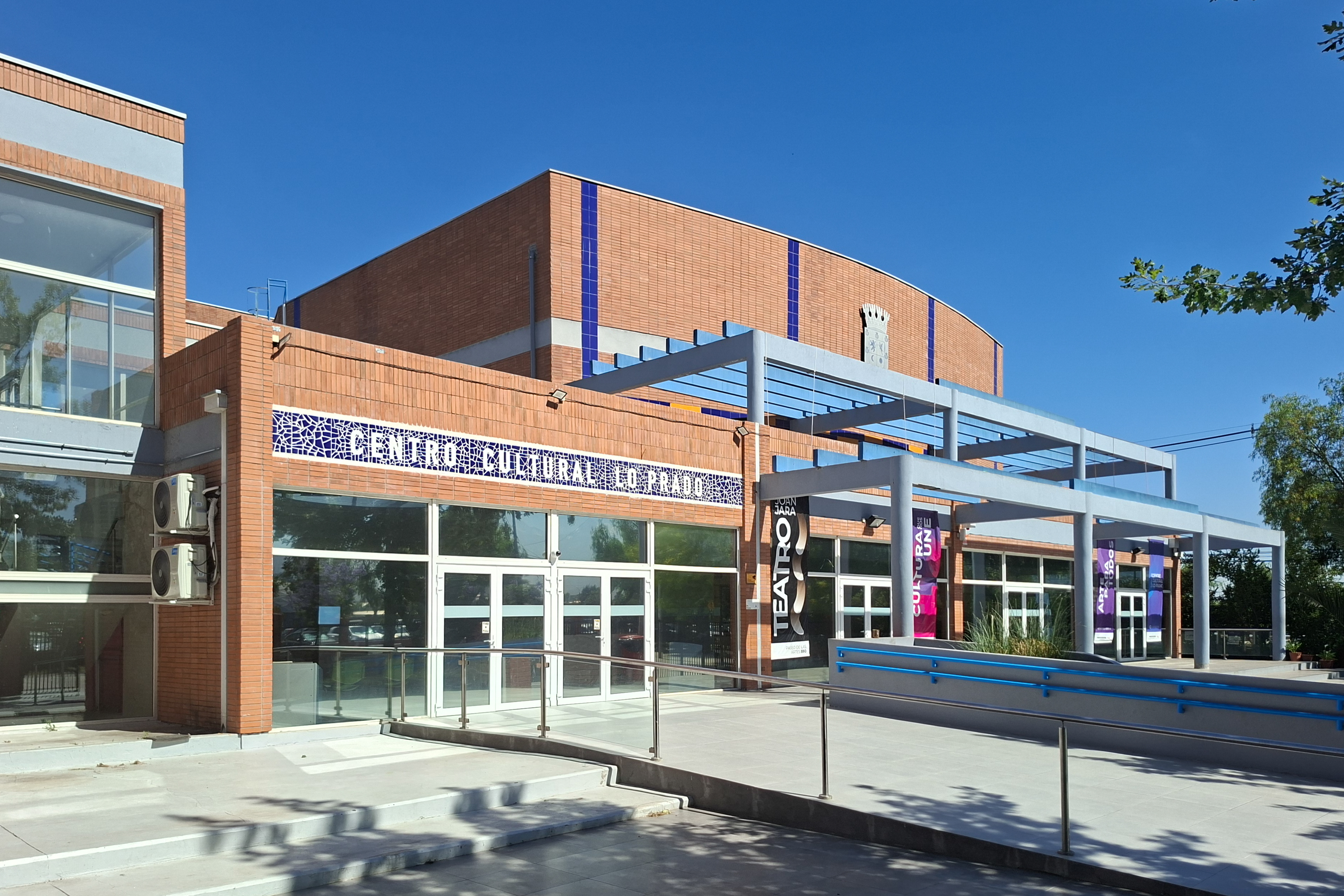
Lo Prado Cultural Center

== Administration ==
As a commune, Lo Prado is a third-level administrative division of Chile administered by a municipal council, headed by an alcalde who is directly elected every four years. The 2024-2028 alcalde is Maximiliano Ríos Galleguillos (PPD). The communal council has the following members:

- Santiago Guerra Sepúlveda (PCCh)
- Paola Sandoval Sepulveda (FA)
- Braulio Alexis Camilo Díaz (Ind/PS)
- Marco Orellana Barra (PPD)
- Diego Pérez Cabrera (Ind/PPD)
- Miguel Antonio Rojas Villarroel (PDG)
- Juan Labra Sanhueza (RN)
- Cesia Bianca Riccio Cuba (REP)

Within the electoral divisions of Chile, Lo Prado is represented in the Chamber of Deputies by Nicolás Monckeberg (RN) and Cristina Girardi (PPD) as part of the 18th electoral district, (together with Cerro Navia and Quinta Normal). The commune is represented in the Senate by Guido Girardi Lavín (PPD) and Jovino Novoa Vásquez (UDI) as part of the 7th senatorial constituency (Santiago-West).

== Demographics ==
As of the 2024 census, the population is 91,290, of which 48.5% are males, and 51.5% are females. People under 15 years old make up 15.7% of the population, and people over 65 years old make up 16.5%. 100% of the population is urban.

Historical population
Year	Pop.	±% p.a.
1970	53,365	—
1982	103,575	+5.68%
1992	110,933	+0.69%
2002	104,316	−0.61%
2017	96,249	−0.54%
2024	91,290	−0.75%
Source: INE, Memoria Chilena

- Average annual household income: US$26,950 (PPP, 2006)
- Population below poverty line: 11.6% (2006)
- Regional quality of life index: 81.80, high, 7 out of 52 (2005)
- Human Development Index: 0.715, 100 out of 341 (2003)

=== Ethnic minorities ===
As of the 2024 census, Indigenous peoples make up 10.6% of the population, and Afro-Chileans make up 1.9%.

=== Religion ===
As of the 2024 census, 71.5% of the population over 15 years old are Christians (51.0% Catholics, 17.1% Evangelicals or Protestants, and 3.4% other branches), 0.1% are Jews, 0.1% are Muslims, 0.1% are Buddhists, 0.02% are Hinduists, 0.7% are adrehents of other religions, and 27.5% are irreligious.

=== Immigration ===
As of the 2024 census, immigrants make up 13.7% of the population - 12.6% are from South America, 1.1% from North America, 0.05% from Europe, 0.03% from Asia, 0.004% from Africa, and 0.001% from Oceania.
