= San Pablo metro station =

Santiago metro station

San Pablo
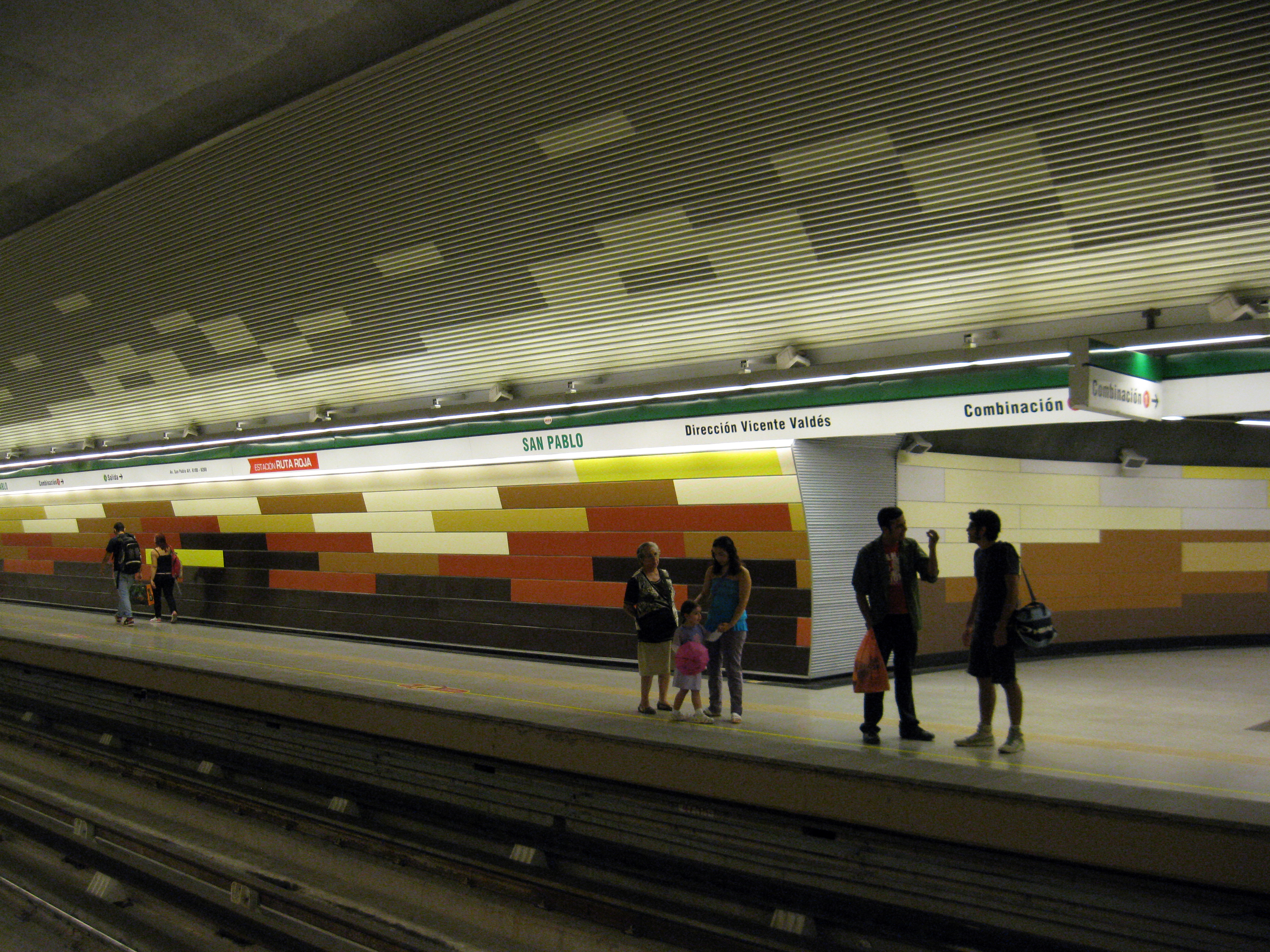
- San Pablo station on the Line 5.

General information
- Location: San Pablo Avenue / Neptuno Avenue
- Coordinates: 33°26′43.11″S 70°43′23.30″W
- System: Santiago rapid transit
- Lines: Line 1 Line 5
- Platforms: Side platforms on and
- Tracks: 2 per line
- Connections: Buses of Red Metropolitana de Movilidad

Construction
- Structure type: Partly open-cut, partly underground Underground
- Accessible: yes

History
- Opened: 15 September 1975; January 12, 2010

Services
Preceding station	Santiago Metro	Following station
Terminus	Line 1	Neptuno towards Los Dominicos
Pudahuel towards Plaza de Maipú	Line 5	Lo Prado towards Vicente Valdés
Location

San Pablo is a rapid transit complex in the Santiago Metro, located in Lo Prado. The station serves Line 1 and Line 5, being the western terminus of the former.

Opening on 15 September 1975 for the Line 1, as part of the inaugural section of the line between San Pablo and La Moneda, San Pablo is one of the oldest stations in the system. The Line 1 platforms are the only ones in the network that are located partly at surface level and partly underground. The Line 5 station was opened on 12 January 2010 as part of the extension of the line from Quinta Normal to Pudahuel.

On October 19, 2019, in the framework of the protests in Chile, the station corresponding to line 1 suffered a fire that severely charred it, including an NS-2007 that was parked on the platforms. The station for line 5 was reopened on December 30, 2019, while the station for line 1 was reopened on July 25, 2020.

On July 10, 2025, work began on the installation of platform screen doors at the station on the Line 1 platform. By December 21, 2025, the first door was in place, marking the start of the installation process. The first screen door platform at this station is scheduled to open in January 2026. This is the first station where work is underway for this project, with the expectation that the entire Line 1 will have platform screen doors by 2028.

== Etymology ==
The station is near the San Pablo avenue, which was the main road to Valparaíso prior to the opening of CH-68 freeway, giving its name. During the building the station was thought to be named in memoriam of folk singer-songwriter Violeta Parra.
