= Los Dominicos metro station =

Santiago metro station

Los Dominicos
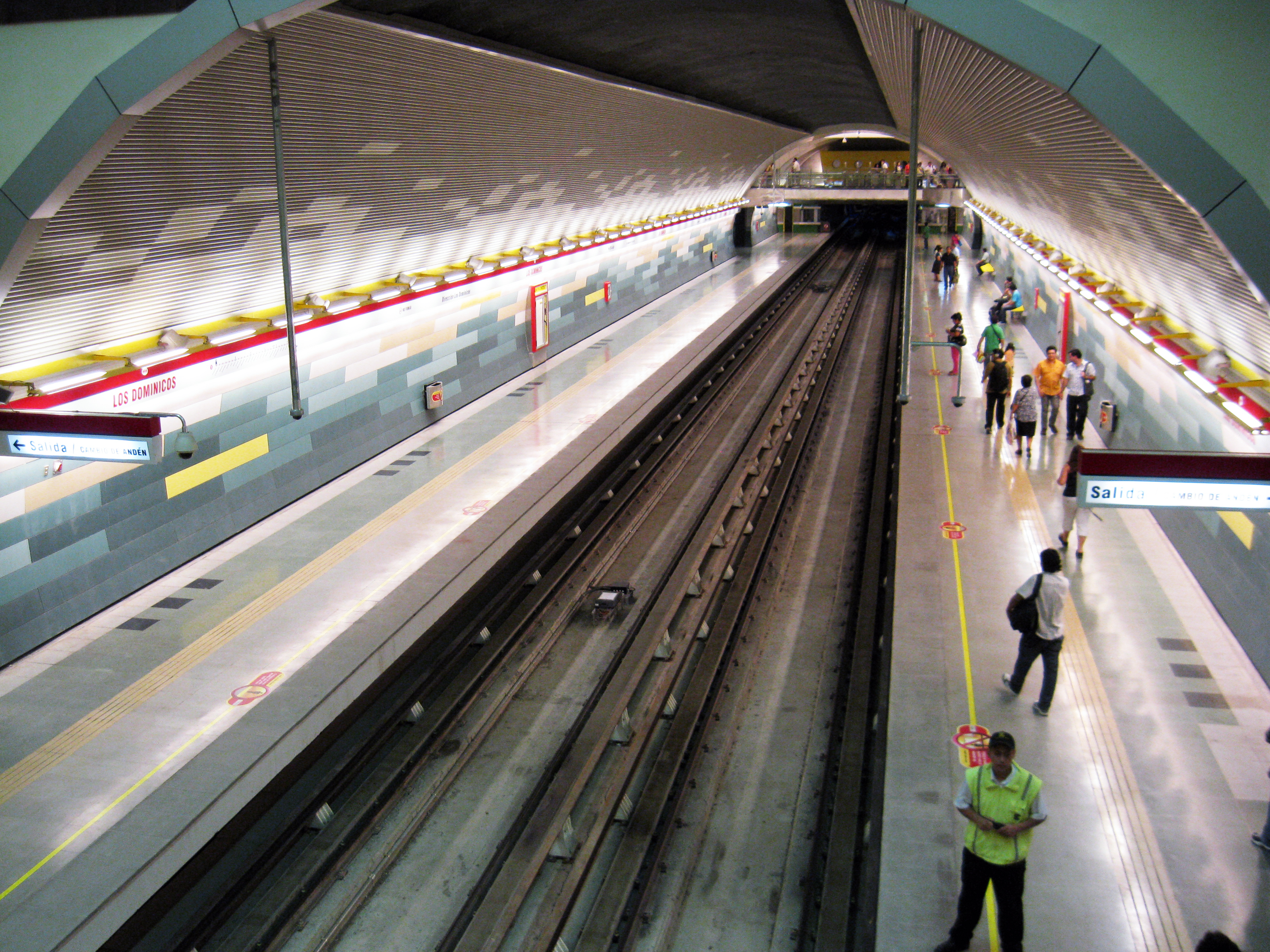
- Los Dominicos station, Santiago Metro

General information
- Location: Apoquindo Avenue / Camino El Alba
- Coordinates: 33°24′28″S 70°32′42″W
- System: Santiago rapid transit
- Line: Line 1
- Platforms: 2 side platforms
- Tracks: 2
- Connections: Transantiago buses

Construction
- Accessible: yes

History
- Opened: January 7, 2010

Services
| Preceding station | Santiago Metro | Following station |
|---|---|---|
| Hernando de Magallanes towards San Pablo | Line 1 | Terminus |
Location

Los Dominicos is a metro station on Line 1 of the Santiago Metro in Santiago, Chile, and is also the eastern terminal of this line.

The station was inaugurated on 7 January 2010 as part of the extension of the line from Escuela Militar to Los Dominicos, and is located at the end of Avenida Apoquindo (Apoquindo Avenue) at the junction with Camino El Alba (El Alba Road) in the municipality of Las Condes. It is located under Los Dominicos Park and near a supermarket, a filling station and an office of the Civil Registry and Identification Service of Chile. The station has a surface area of 5,390 square metres or 58,017 square feet.

Los Dominicos station is an important transport connection point between the Santiago municipalities of Las Condes, Vitacura, La Reina and Lo Barnechea. It also provides public transportation access to the craft market “Pueblito de los Dominicos” (Los Dominicos Village) and the San Vicente Ferrer church, both popular touristic attractions, as well as the Los Dominicos fresh food market, located in Los Dominicos Park.

== See also ==
- Los Dominicos Park
- Los Dominicos Village
