= Santiago Metro Line 8 =

Subway line in Santiago, Chile

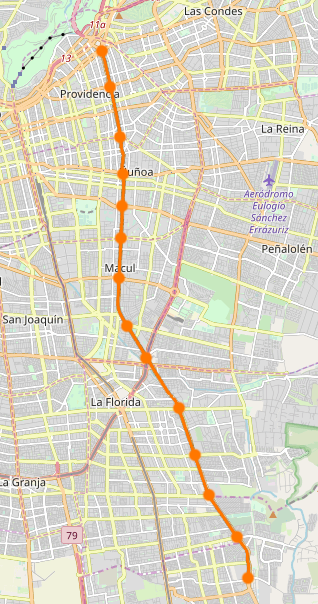
- Map of Line 8

Overview
- Status: Under tender
- Owner: Empresa de Transporte de Pasajeros Metro S.A.
- Locale: Santiago
- Termini: Los Leones metro station; Mall Plaza Tobalaba
- Stations: 14

Service
- Type: Rapid transit
- System: Santiago Metro, Transantiago
- Services: 1
- Operator(s): Empresa de Transporte de Pasajeros Metro S.A.

History
- Planned opening: 2032; 6 years' time

Technical
- Line length: 19 km (12 mi)
- Number of tracks: 2
- Character: Underground
Route map

Santiago Metro Line 8 is a planned rapid transit line that will form part of the Santiago Metro. It is planned to have an approximate length of 19 kilometres (12 mi), connecting the communes of Providencia on the northeast and Puente Alto on the southeast of the Chilean capital, passing through Ñuñoa, Macul, and La Florida.

It will connect with lines 1 and 6 in Los Leones, with line 3 in Chile España, and with line 4 in Macul. Its distinctive color on the network line map is orange.

== History ==
The Secretaría Interministerial de Planificación de Transporte (Sectra) proposed in 2006 the construction of a metro line along the Los Leones–Macul–La Florida corridor, a project that was ultimately frozen due to the Transantiago crisis.

The line was proposed again as "Line 10" during Sebastián Piñera's 2017 presidential campaign. That version comprised 12 stations over 17 km, beginning at Avenida Irarrázaval and heading south. After being elected president, Piñera made the official announcement of construction on June 1, 2018, during his annual public address. The officially designated Line 8 retained the same proposal from October of the previous year, but with a northern extension so that the line would connect with Line 1 at Los Leones.

In July 2019, Metro opened the tender for the basic civil engineering works for the Line 8 project.

=== Postponement and reactivation ===
Due to the October 2019 protests in Santiago that severely damaged the Santiago Metro, on March 9, 2020, the company declared the tenders for lines 8 and 9 void. This decision was largely driven by the need to redirect funds toward repairing damage caused by the numerous incendiary attacks suffered by various stations during the social unrest.

On September 5, 2021, the tendering process was reactivated, with an initial estimate that Line 8 would be ready by 2030. On February 27, 2022, a public tender was issued for the basic civil engineering design of the project. The basic engineering work was completed during 2023, after which preparations began for submitting the Environmental Impact Study (EIA).

In July 2024, Metro submitted the project for environmental review by delivering the technical and formal documentation of the EIA to the Environmental Evaluation Service (SEA), initiating the formal permitting process. The total projected investment is approximately US$1.9 billion. On April 23, 2026, the SEA published its Consolidated Evaluation Report (ICE) recommending approval of the EIA. On May 6, 2026, the Environmental Evaluation Commission (Coeva) of the Santiago Metropolitan Region unanimously approved the project.

The line is expected to open in two phases: the section between Chile España and Mall Plaza Tobalaba in 2032, and the northern section from Chile España to Los Leones in 2033.

== Urban landmarks ==
Line 8 will pass through various urban landmarks that previously lacked a direct Metro connection. Traveling from north to south, the route begins on Avenida Providencia and will serve the Plaza 18 de Septiembre in the Barrio El Aguilucho neighborhood, Avenida Irarrázaval in central Ñuñoa, the Macul Campus of the Universidad Metropolitana de Ciencias de la Educación, Mall Portal Ñuñoa, the civic district of Macul known as Barrio Punta de Rieles, the Complejo Deportivo Juan Pinto Durán, Avenida La Florida, Mall Patio Outlet La Florida, Mall Plaza Tobalaba, and the El Peral Psychiatric Hospital, in addition to residential neighborhoods across Providencia, Ñuñoa, Macul, La Florida, and Puente Alto.

== Stations ==
The tentative station names are listed below from north to south. Final names will be determined through a public participation process.

Station (tentative name)	Transfers	Location	Opening	Commune
Los Leones		Av. Los Leones / Colipí	2033	Providencia
Eliodoro Yáñez		Av. Los Leones / Av. Eliodoro Yáñez	2033	Providencia
Diagonal Oriente		General Artigas / Pedro Lautaro Ferrer	2033	Providencia / Ñuñoa
Chile España		Av. José Pedro Alessandri / Dublé Almeyda	2032	Ñuñoa
Grecia (Note: Not to be confused with the Grecia station on Line 4.)		Av. José Pedro Alessandri / Av. Grecia	2032	Ñuñoa
Rodrigo de Araya (Note: Not to be confused with the Rodrigo de Araya station on Line 5.)		Av. Macul / Av. Rodrigo de Araya	2032	Ñuñoa / Macul
Quilín (Note: Not to be confused with the Quilin station on Line 4.)		Av. Macul / Av. Quilín	2032	Macul
Las Torres (Note: Not to be confused with the Las Torres station on Line 4.)		Av. Macul / Av. Dr. Amador Neghme	2032	Macul
Macul		Av. La Florida / Av. Américo Vespucio	2032	Macul / La Florida / Peñalolén
Walker Martínez		Av. La Florida / Av. Walker Martínez	2032	La Florida
Rojas Magallanes (Note: Not to be confused with the Rojas Magallanes station on Line 4.)		Av. La Florida / Av. Rojas Magallanes	2032	La Florida
Trinidad (Note: Not to be confused with the Trinidad station on Line 4.)		Av. La Florida / Av. Trinidad Oriente	2032	La Florida / Puente Alto
Diego Portales		Av. Camilo Henríquez / Av. Diego Portales	2032	La Florida / Puente Alto
Mall Plaza Tobalaba		Av. Camilo Henríquez / Cerro Punta Negra	2032	Puente Alto
