= Elisa Correa metro station =

Santiago metro station

Elisa Correa
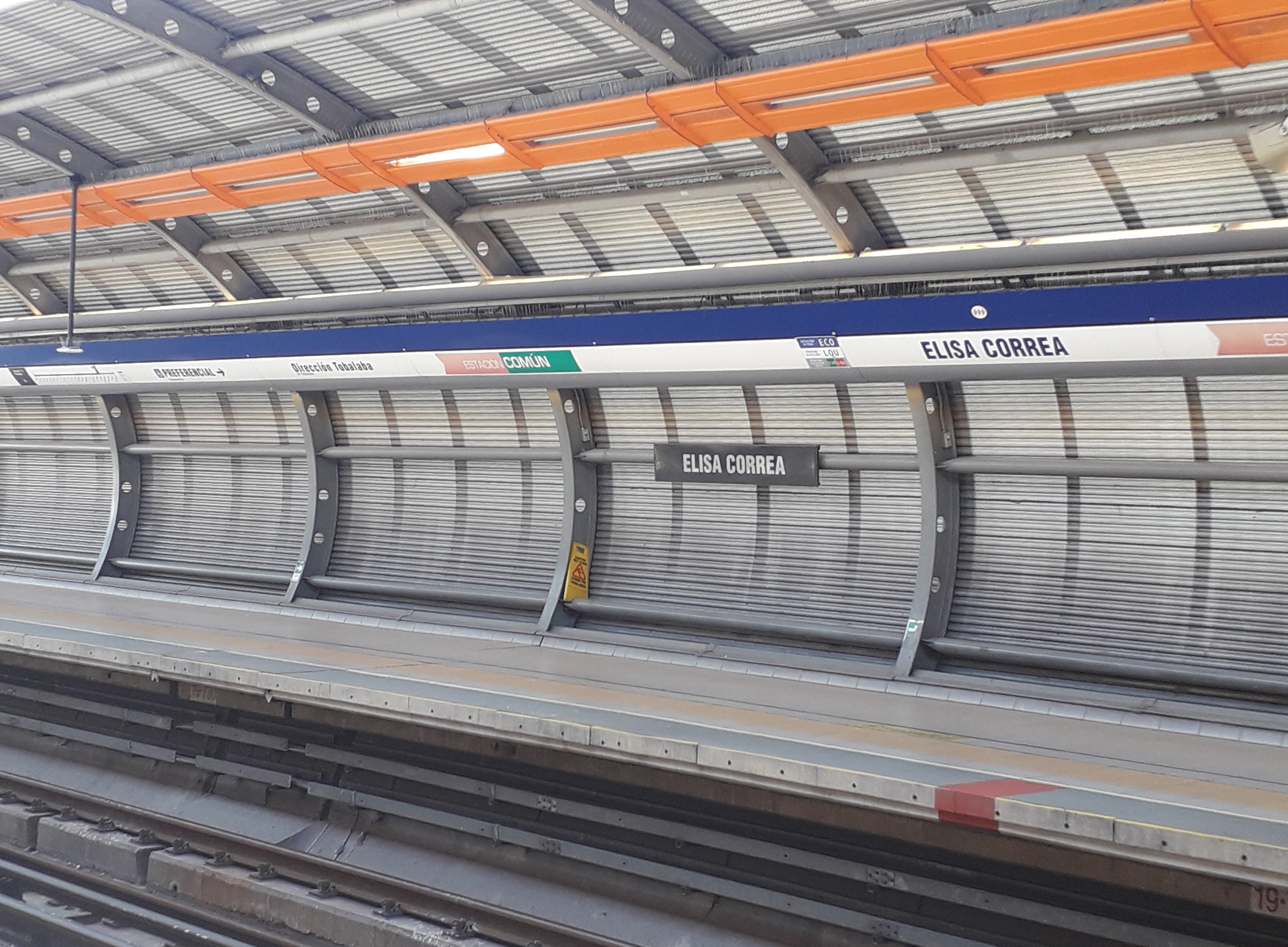
- Inside the station

General information
- Location: Vicuña Mackenna Avenue / Elisa Correa Street
- Coordinates: 33°34′10″S 70°35′02″W
- System: Santiago rapid transit
- Line: Line 4
- Platforms: 2 side platforms
- Tracks: 2
- Connections: Transantiago buses

Construction
- Accessible: yes

History
- Opened: November 30, 2005

Services
Preceding station	Santiago Metro	Following station
Los Quillayes towards Tobalaba	Line 4	Hospital Sótero del Río towards Plaza de Puente Alto
Location

Elisa Correa station is an elevated metro station located on the overhead section of Line 4 of the Santiago Metro, in Santiago, Chile. The station is located on the boundary between the communes of Puente Alto and La Florida, and is the last station of the line 4 on the Cordillera province heading into the center of Santiago. It is named after the street where it is located, the junction of Elisa Correa Sanfuentes Street to the west, Los Toros Venue to the east and Vicuña Mackenna Avenue to the north and Concha y Toro Avenue to the south.

The station was opened on 30 November 2005 as part of the inaugural section of the line between Vicente Valdés and Plaza de Puente Alto.

The station's surroundings include a filling station, a medical centre, local stores and a supermarket.

== Etymology ==
Elisa Correa Sanfuentes was the wife of Enrique Sanfuentes Andonaegui, a lawyer and minister of finance, minister of industry, minister of public works and minister of the interior in the government of José Manuel Balmaceda.
