= Macul metro station =

Santiago metro station

Macul
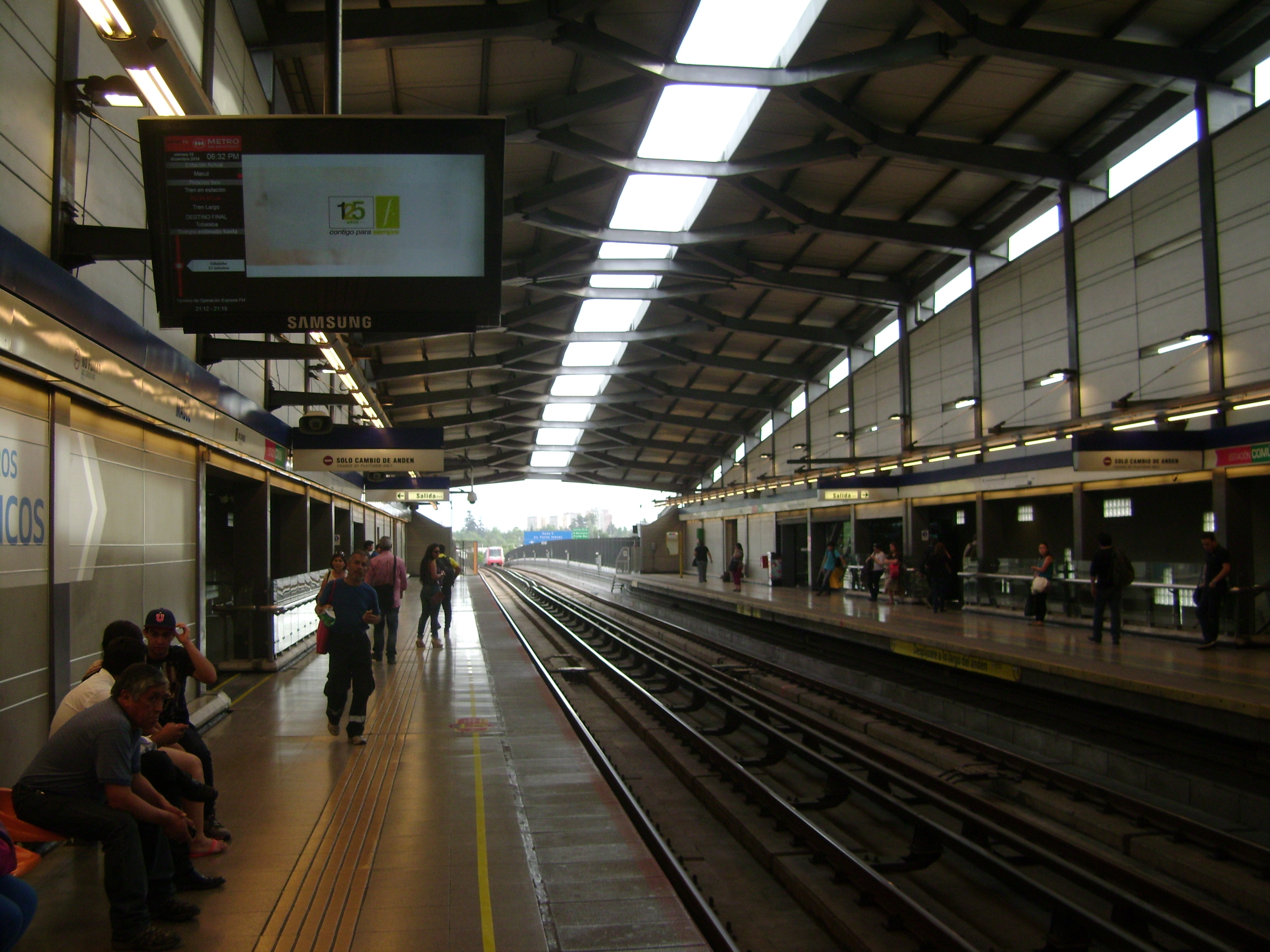

General information
- Coordinates: 33°30′33.33″S 70°35′24.26″W
- System: Santiago rapid transit
- Line: Line 4
- Platforms: 2 side platforms
- Tracks: 2
- Connections: Transantiago buses

Construction
- Accessible: yes

History
- Opened: March 2, 2006; 2032

Services
Preceding station	Santiago Metro	Following station
Las Torres towards Tobalaba	Line 4	Vicuña Mackenna towards Plaza de Puente Alto
Location

Macul is a metro station on the Line 4 of the Santiago Metro, in Santiago, Chile. The station occupies the central viaduct of three adjacent overpasses. The other elevated bridges carry three one-way lanes each of Vespucio Sur. It is located on the site of a former roundabout, where Américo Vespucio Avenue, La Florida Avenue, Macul Avenue and Departamental Avenue used meet. The latter ones currently pass under the aforementioned viaducts, as does a canal called Zanjón de la Aguada. The station was opened on 2 March 2006 as part of the connection between Grecia and Vicente Valdés.

On October 18, 2019, in the framework of the protests in Chile, the station suffered a fire that affected mezzanine, the ticket office and a train that was parked on the platforms, which would prevent its normal operation for several months. The station remained closed until August 12, 2020 when the station was reopened.

It is expected that by 2032 this station will be combined with the future Line 8.
