= Francisco Bilbao metro station =

Santiago metro station

Francisco Bilbao
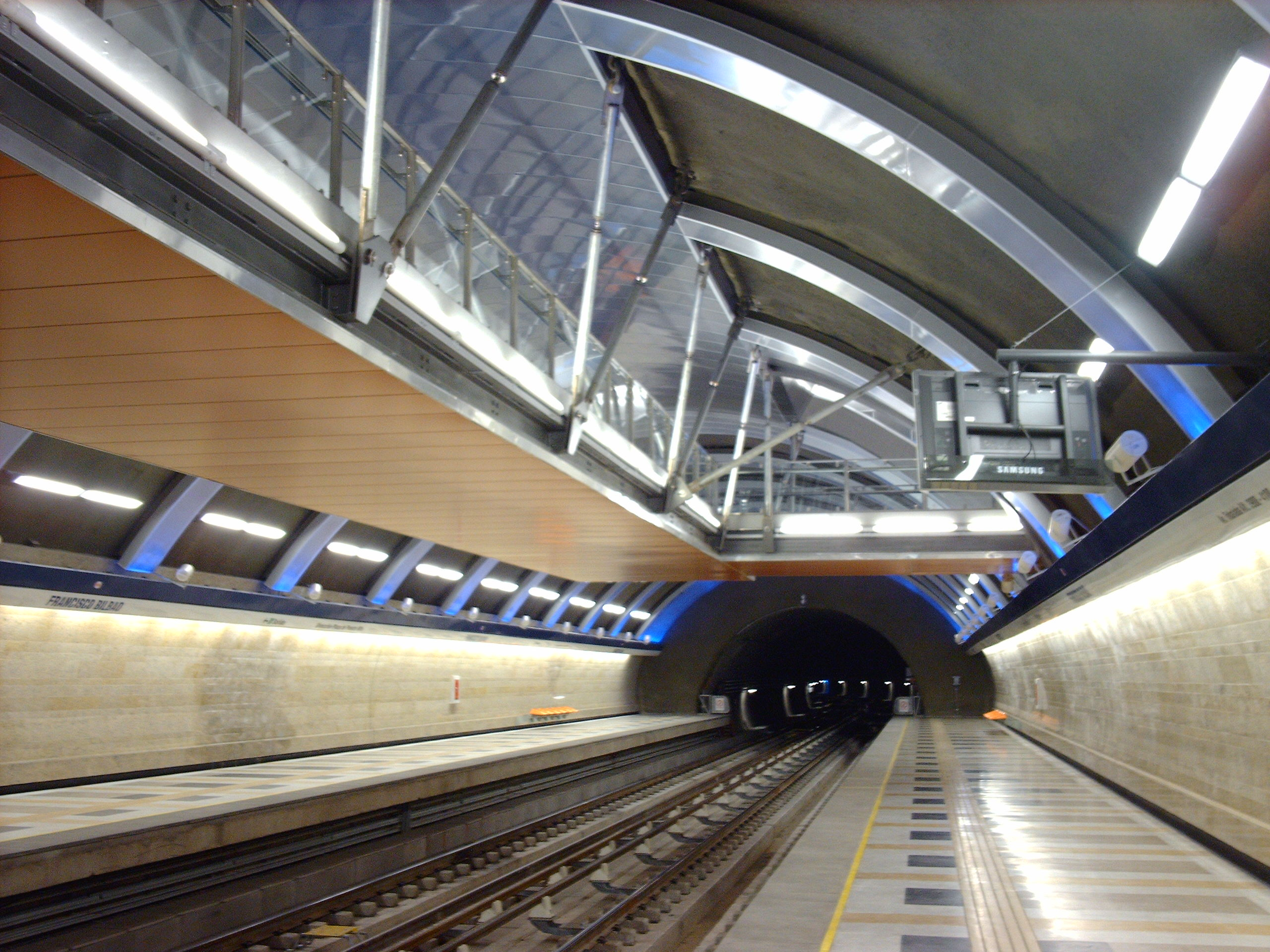

General information
- Coordinates: 33°25′54.52″S 70°35′5.15″W
- System: Santiago rapid transit
- Line: Line 4
- Platforms: 2 side platforms
- Tracks: 2
- Connections: Transantiago buses

Construction
- Accessible: yes

History
- Opened: November 30, 2005

Services
Preceding station	Santiago Metro	Following station
Cristóbal Colón towards Tobalaba	Line 4	Príncipe de Gales towards Plaza de Puente Alto
Location

Francisco Bilbao is an underground metro station on the Line 4 of the Santiago Metro, in Santiago, Chile. It is located under the intersection of Tobalaba Avenue and Francisco Bilbao Avenue. The latter avenue, which is named after Francisco Bilbao, gives its name to the station. The station was opened on 30 November 2005 as part of the inaugural section of the line between Tobalaba and Grecia.
