= Protectora de la Infancia metro station =

Santiago metro station

Protectora de la Infancia
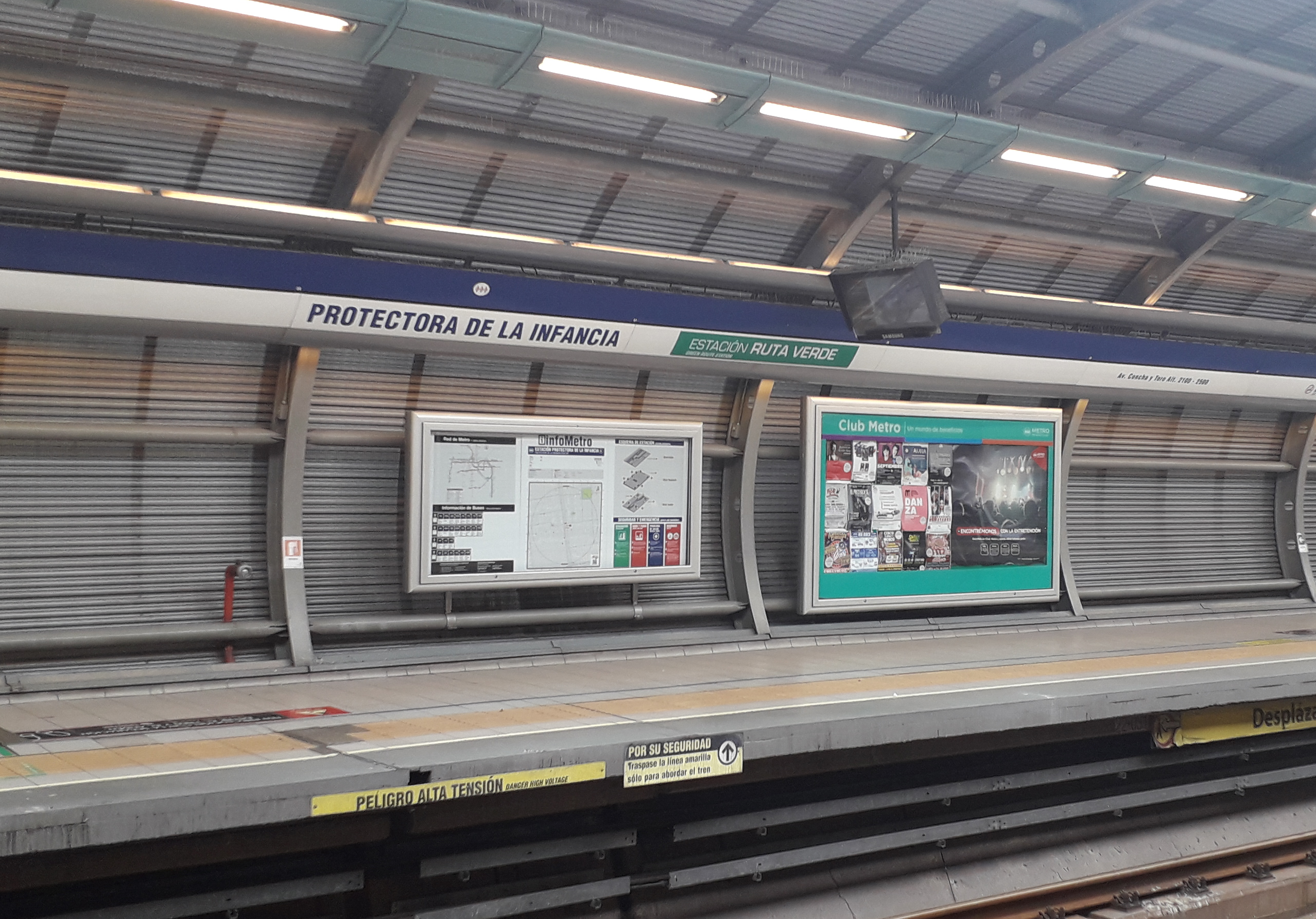

General information
- Location: Concha y Toro Avenue / Ángel Pimentel Street
- Coordinates: 33°35′22.98″S 70°34′47.54″W
- System: Santiago rapid transit
- Line: Line 4
- Platforms: 2 side platforms
- Tracks: 2
- Connections: Transantiago buses

Construction
- Accessible: yes

History
- Opened: November 30, 2005

Services
Preceding station	Santiago Metro	Following station
Hospital Sótero del Río towards Tobalaba	Line 4	Las Mercedes towards Plaza de Puente Alto
Location

Protectora de la Infancia station is an elevated metro station located on the overhead section of Line 4 of the Santiago Metro, in Santiago, Chile. It named after the Protectora de la Infancia (“Childhood Protectoress”) children's charity, whose headquarters are just opposite the station.

The station was opened on 30 November 2005 as part of the inaugural section of the line between Vicente Valdés and Plaza de Puente Alto.

The station is located in the commune of Puente Alto on Concha y Toro Avenue, near the junction with Angel Pimentel Street. It has disabled access.

The number of passengers passing through this station is relatively low, except in rush hours when traffic increases dramatically. The station's surroundings include the Compañia de Jesus Catholic school, Los Nogales School, Las Nieves School, and a public-owned swimming pool, along with its namesake.

== Etymology ==
The Protectora de la Infancia describes itself as a secular, non-profit, Catholic-inspired educational organisation which is dedicated to helping children at social risk. It provides education, boarding schools and other services to more than 8,500 Chilean children.
