= Simón Bolívar metro station (Santiago) =

Santiago metro station

Simón Bolívar
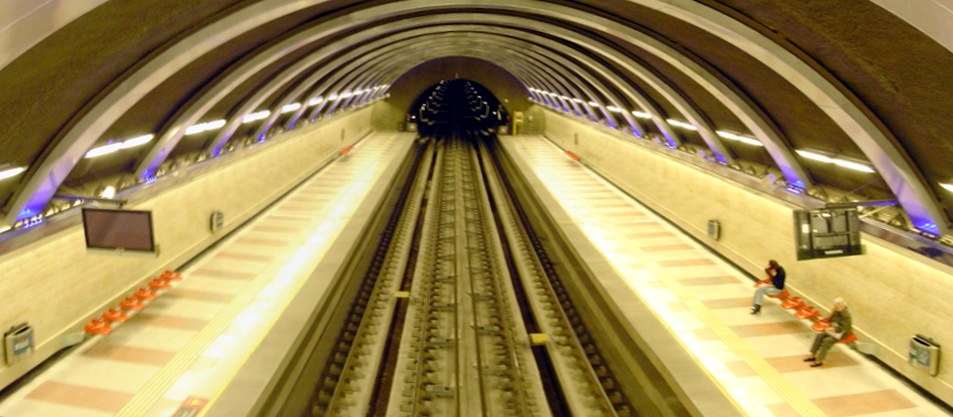

General information
- Location: Ossa Avenue / Echeñique Avenue
- Coordinates: 33°26′45.19″S 70°34′19.3″W
- System: Santiago rapid transit
- Line: Line 4
- Platforms: 2 side platforms
- Tracks: 2
- Connections: Transantiago buses

Construction
- Accessible: yes

History
- Opened: November 30, 2005

Services
| Preceding station | Santiago Metro | Following station |
|---|---|---|
| Príncipe de Gales towards Tobalaba | Line 4 | Plaza Egaña towards Plaza de Puente Alto |
Location

Simón Bolívar is an underground metro station on the Line 4 of the Santiago Metro, in Santiago, Chile. It is named for the nearby Simón Bolívar Avenue, which in turn is named after Simón Bolívar. The station was opened on 30 November 2005 as part of the inaugural section of the line between Tobalaba and Grecia.
