= Hospital Sótero del Río metro station =

Santiago metro station

Hospital Sótero del Río
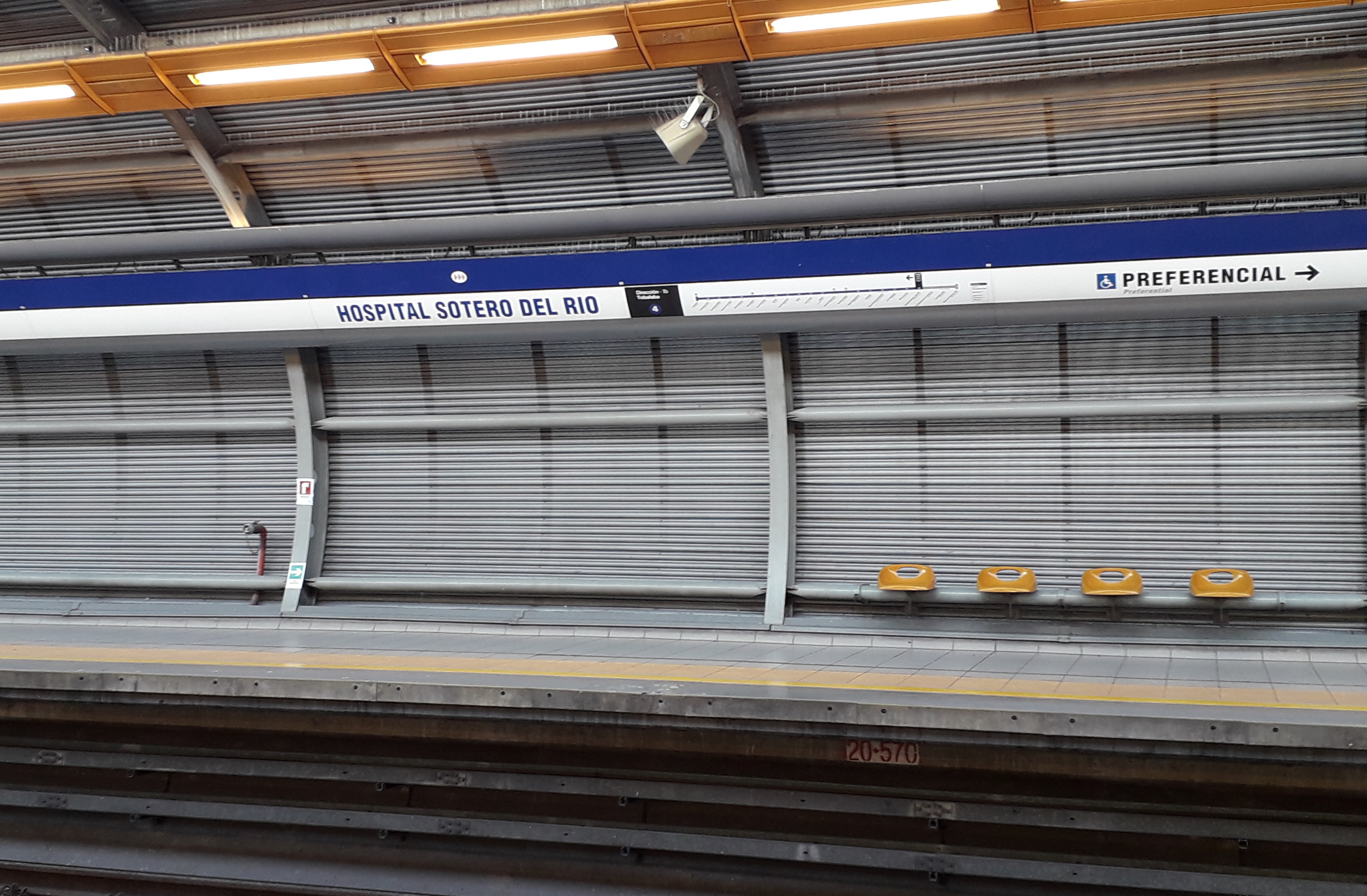
- Inside the station

General information
- Location: Concha y Toro Avenue / Gabriela Avenue
- Coordinates: 33°34′37″S 70°34′56″W
- System: Santiago rapid transit
- Line: Line 4
- Platforms: 2 side platforms
- Tracks: 2
- Connections: Transantiago buses

Construction
- Accessible: yes

History
- Opened: November 30, 2005

Services
Preceding station	Santiago Metro	Following station
Elisa Correa towards Tobalaba	Line 4	Protectora de la Infancia towards Plaza de Puente Alto
Location

Hospital Sótero del Río station is an elevated metro station located on the overhead section of Line 4 of the Santiago Metro, in Santiago, Chile. It is named after the Sótero del Río Hospital, which is directly surrounding the station. The station is located in Concha y Toro Avenue near its junction with Gabriela Avenue.

The station was opened on 30 November 2005 as part of the inaugural section of the line between Vicente Valdés and Plaza de Puente Alto.

The station's surroundings include the Sótero del Río Hospital, the Josefina Martínez children's hospital, schools, a religious centre, local stores, a supermarket, and the 38th Comisaría de Puente Alto police station. The location of this station makes it useful for patients of both hospitals.

Unusually for an elevated station, the ticket office and concourse are located underground. This is to create extra space due to the large number of commuters travelling through the station.

== Etymology ==
The station takes the name from the hospital, which is named after Sótero del Río Gundián (born in Cauquenes, at March 29, 1900; died in Santiago, Chile, at May 10, 1969). Del Río was a physician, scholar, researcher, entrepreneur, business leader and Chilean politician. He served as Minister of State for the Presidents Juan Esteban Montero, Juan Antonio Ríos, Gabriel González Videla and Jorge Alessandri. His namesake hospital is the largest in southeastern Santiago, and one of the most important in Santiago.
