= Los Orientales metro station =

Santiago metro station

Los Orientales
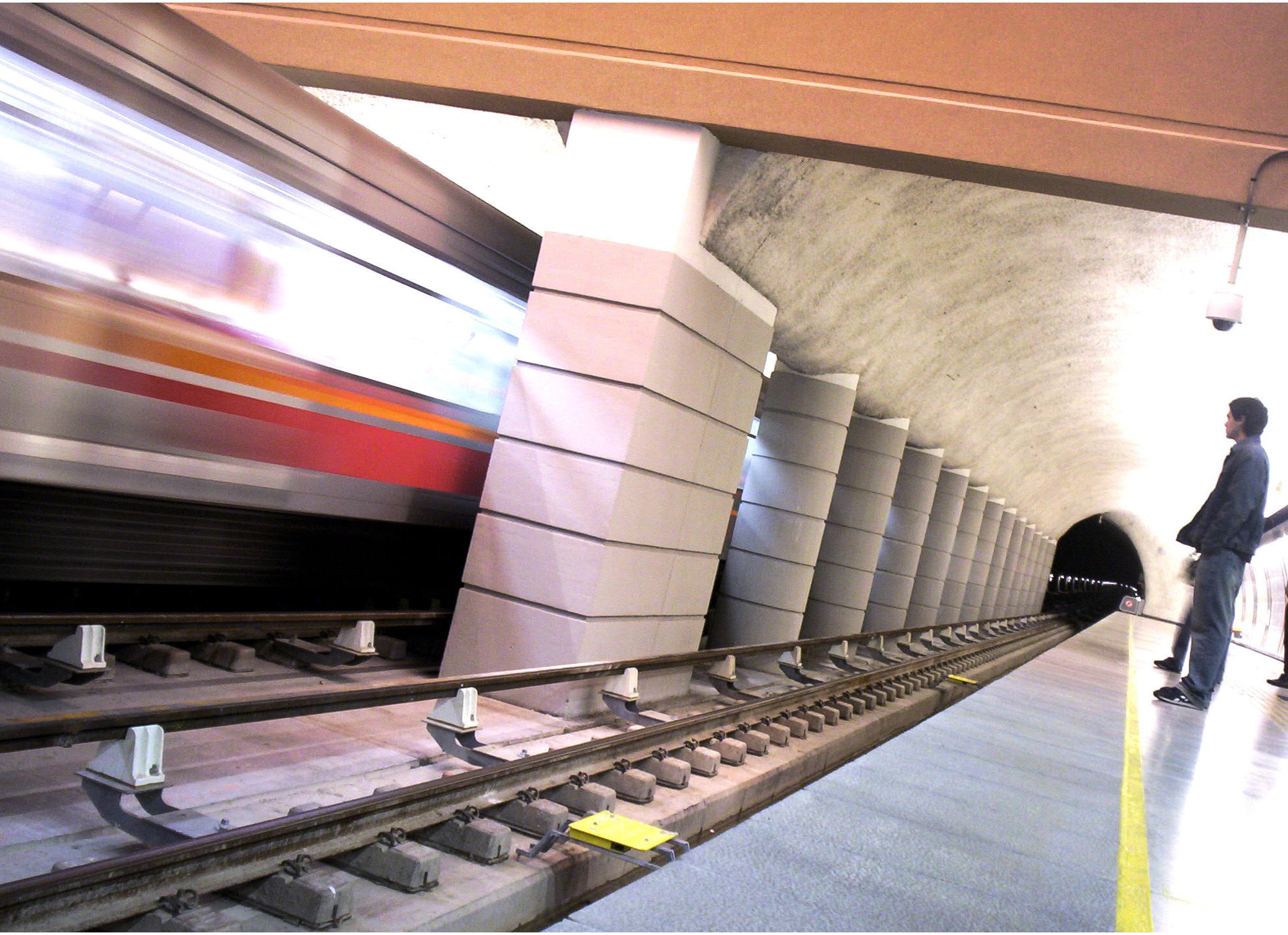

General information
- Location: Américo Vespucio Avenue / Oriental Avenue
- Coordinates: 33°27′44.54″S 70°34′25.50″W
- System: Santiago rapid transit
- Line: Line 4
- Platforms: 2 side platforms
- Tracks: 2
- Connections: Transantiago buses

Construction
- Accessible: yes

History
- Opened: November 30, 2005

Services
Preceding station	Santiago Metro	Following station
Plaza Egaña towards Tobalaba	Line 4	Grecia towards Plaza de Puente Alto
Location

Los Orientales is an underground metro station on the Line 4 of the Santiago Metro, in Santiago, Chile. The station was opened on 30 November 2005 as part of the inaugural section of the line between Tobalaba and Grecia.

Like in Plaza Egaña, there are columns between the two tracks that support a double barrel vaulted ceiling. The station has platforms 140 m (460 ft) in length.
