= Quilín metro station =

Santiago metro station

Quilín
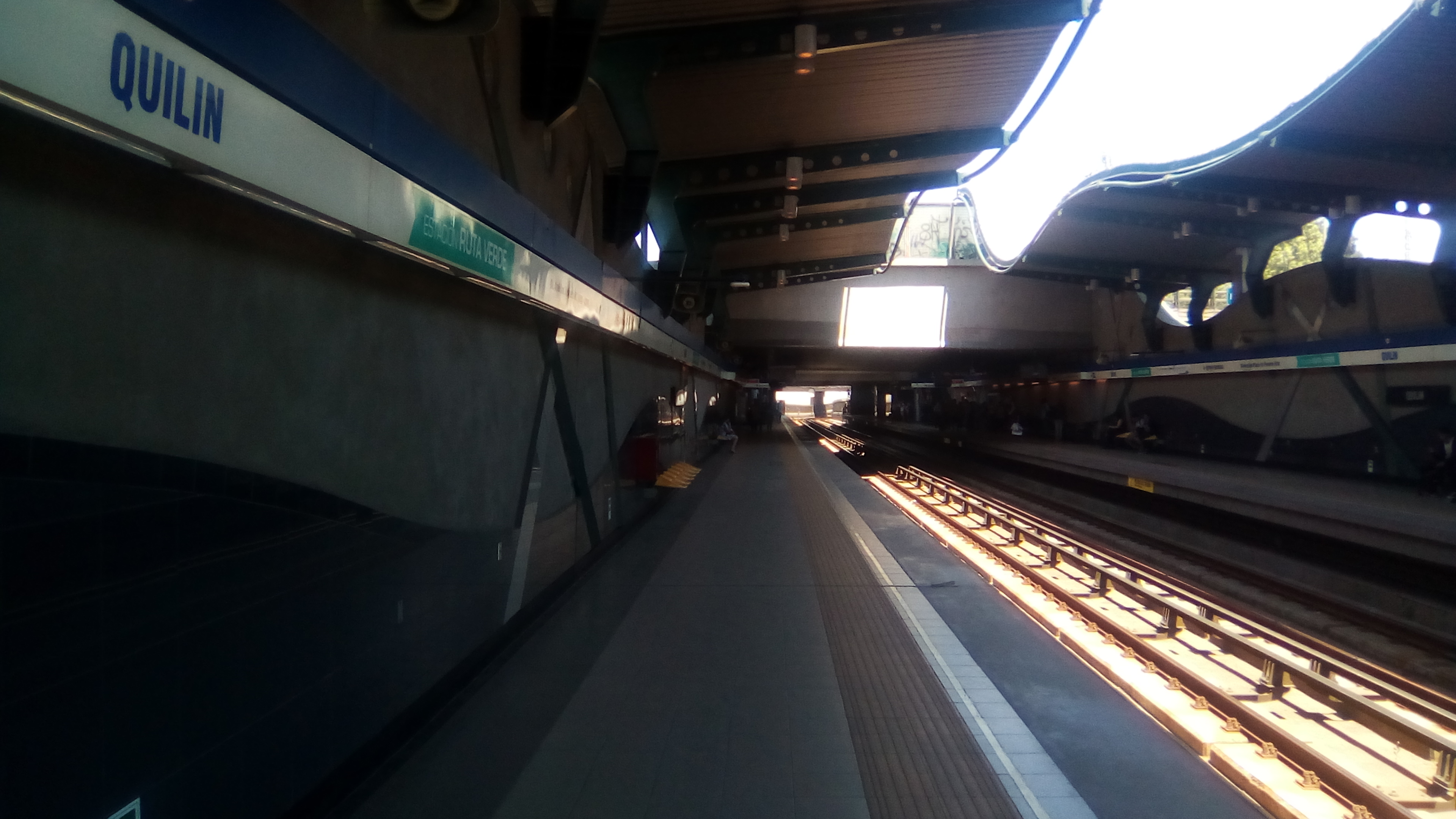

General information
- Location: Vespucio Sur Freeway / Quilín Avenue
- Coordinates: 33°29′16.52″S 70°34′49.20″W
- System: Santiago rapid transit
- Line: Line 4
- Platforms: 2 side platforms
- Tracks: 2
- Connections: Transantiago buses

Construction
- Accessible: yes

History
- Opened: March 2, 2006

Services
Preceding station	Santiago Metro	Following station
Los Presidentes towards Tobalaba	Line 4	Las Torres towards Plaza de Puente Alto
Location

Quilín is a freeway-median metro station on the Line 4 of the Santiago Metro, in Santiago, Chile. It acts as a central support structure for the northern bridge of a roundabout interchange called Quilín. The station was opened on 2 March 2006 as part of the connection between Grecia and Vicente Valdés.

The station features an undulating roof whose central portion is part of the road deck of the aforementioned bridge. It has a mezzanine on its southern end; the mezzanine is connected to two exits by a curved grade-separated walkway, which consists of a footbridge at the center and two pedestrian tunnels at both ends.
