= Las Mercedes metro station =

Santiago metro station

Las Mercedes
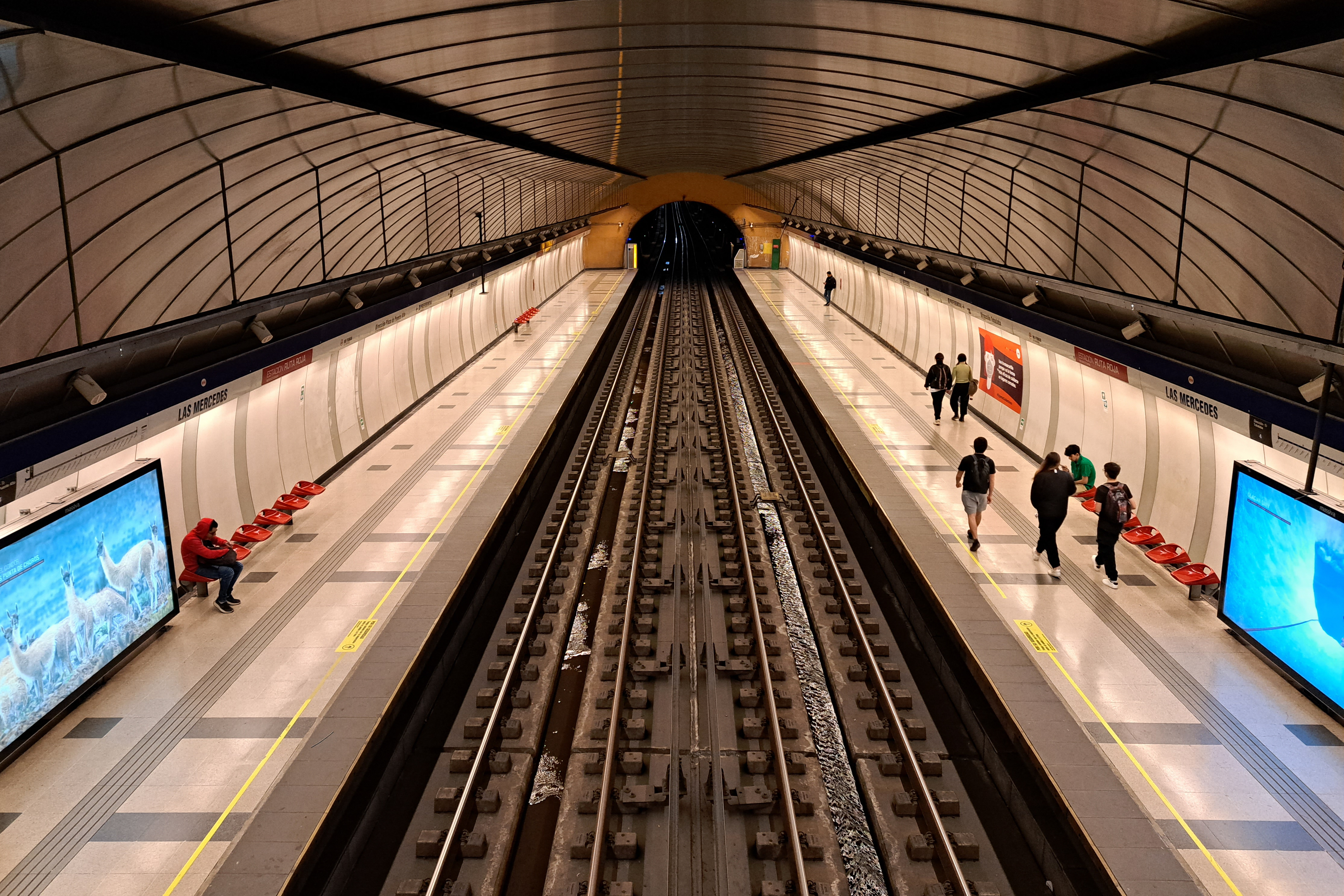
- Inside the station

General information
- Location: Concha y Toro Avenue / Independencia Street
- Coordinates: 33°36′5.67″S 70°34′38.82″W
- System: Santiago rapid transit
- Line: Line 4
- Platforms: 2 side platforms
- Tracks: 2
- Connections: Transantiago buses

Construction
- Accessible: yes

History
- Opened: November 30, 2005

Services
Preceding station	Santiago Metro	Following station
Protectora de la Infancia towards Tobalaba	Line 4	Plaza de Puente Alto Terminus
Location

Las Mercedes is an underground metro station located on Line 4 of the Santiago Metro, in Santiago, Chile. It lies opposite Concha y Toro Avenue between Independencia Street and Domingo Tocornal Avenue. The station was opened on 30 November 2005 as part of the inaugural section of the line between Vicente Valdés and Plaza de Puente Alto.

The area around the station, which in the past held fields and empty land, has become a commercial hub with business and real estate development. The station has exits connecting directly with two shopping centres, one on either side of Concha y Toro Avenue, and the Independencia Square and Espacio Urbano shopping malls. Between both malls lie two movie theaters, several department stores, three supermarkets, along with banks, drugstores and fast-food chains.

== Etymology ==
The commune of Puente Alto petitioned to the Metro board to naming the station Las Mercedes in honor of the Nuestra Señora de la Merced Church, also known as “Parroquia Nuestra Señora de Las Mercedes”, located at Puente Alto downtown.
