= Las Torres metro station =

Santiago metro station

Las Torres
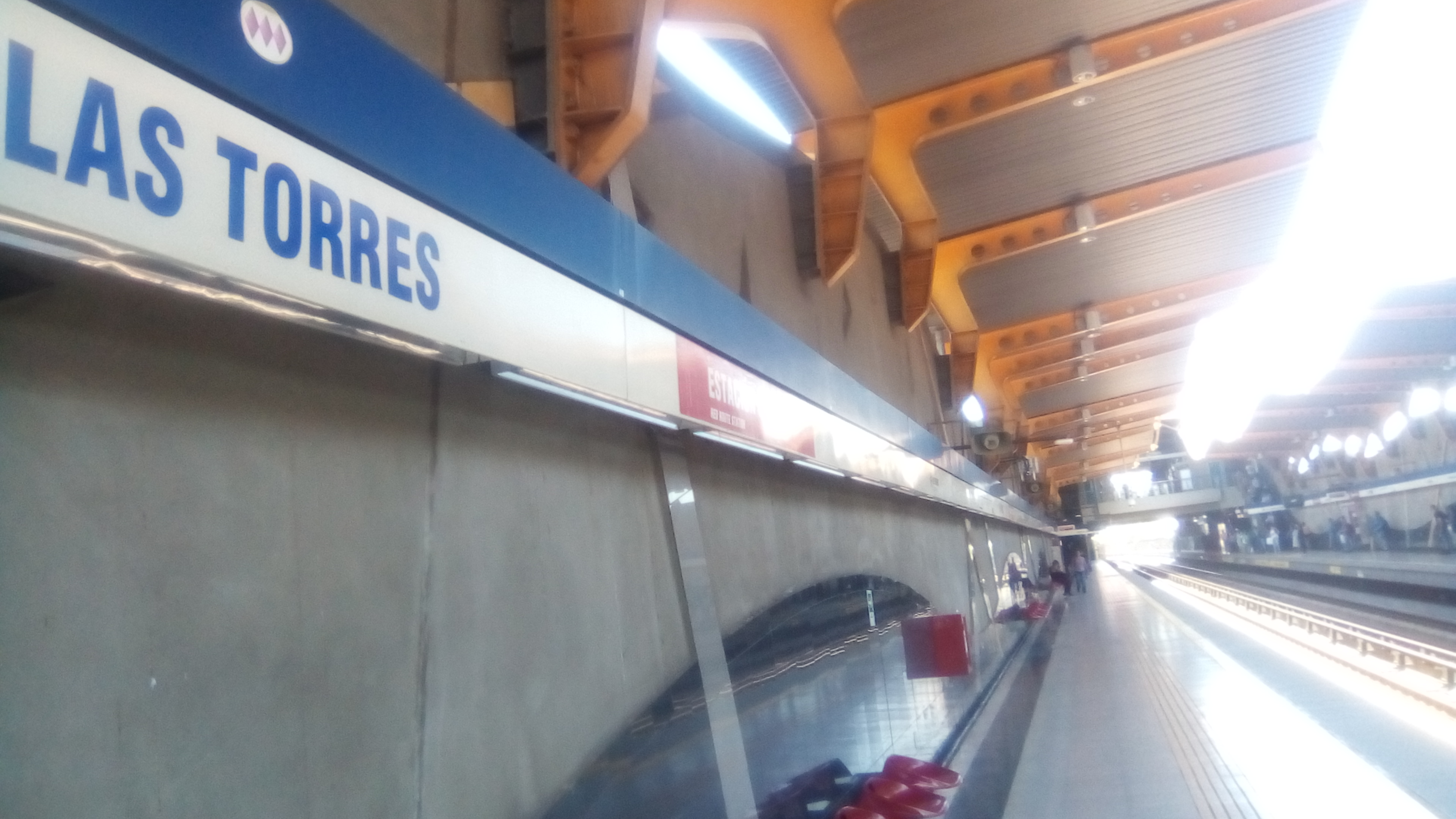

General information
- Coordinates: 33°29′55.86″S 70°35′10.81″W
- System: Santiago rapid transit
- Line: Line 4
- Platforms: 2 side platforms
- Tracks: 2
- Connections: Transantiago buses

Construction
- Accessible: yes

History
- Opened: March 2, 2006

Services
Preceding station	Santiago Metro	Following station
Quilín towards Tobalaba	Line 4	Macul towards Plaza de Puente Alto
Location

Las Torres is a freeway-median metro station on the Line 4 of the Santiago Metro, in Santiago, Chile. It is built into the median of Vespucio Sur expressway. The station is located immediately north of the cloverleaf interchange of Américo Vespucio Avenue and Las Torres Avenue, which is named so because it features high tension towers along its median (Las Torres is Spanish for The Towers). Las Torres Avenue gives its name to the station. The station was opened on 2 March 2006 as part of the connection between Grecia and Vicente Valdés.

The station features a sinusoidal roof, with a much larger wave covering the mezzanine level, which is accessed via two pedestrian bridges.

Nearby points of interest include the building housing the main offices of the concessionaire of Vespucio Sur and the Doctor Luis Tisné Hospital.
