= San José de la Estrella metro station =

Santiago metro station

San José de la Estrella
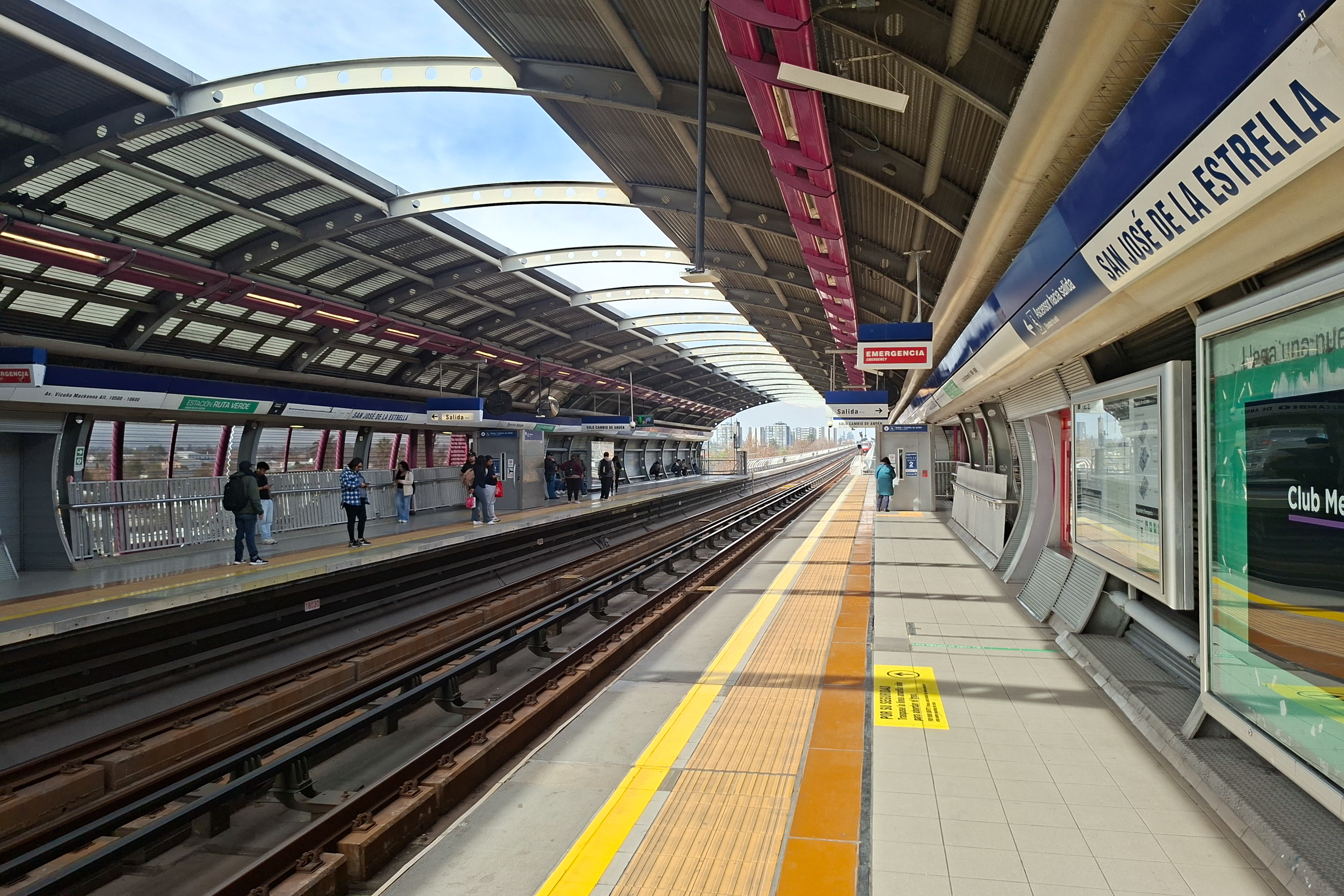

General information
- Location: Vicuña Mackenna Avenue / San José de la Estrella Street
- Coordinates: 33°33′12.95″S 70°35′11.61″W
- System: Santiago rapid transit
- Line: Line 4
- Platforms: 2 side platforms
- Tracks: 2
- Connections: Transantiago buses

Construction
- Accessible: yes

History
- Opened: 5 November 2009

Services
Preceding station	Santiago Metro	Following station
Trinidad towards Tobalaba	Line 4	Los Quillayes towards Plaza de Puente Alto
Location

San José de la Estrella is an elevated metro station on the Line 4 of the Santiago Metro, in Santiago, Chile. This infill station was built between two operating metro stations on 5 November 2009.
