= Los Presidentes metro station =

Santiago metro station

Coordinates: 33°28′37.56″S 70°34′43.21″W

Los Presidentes
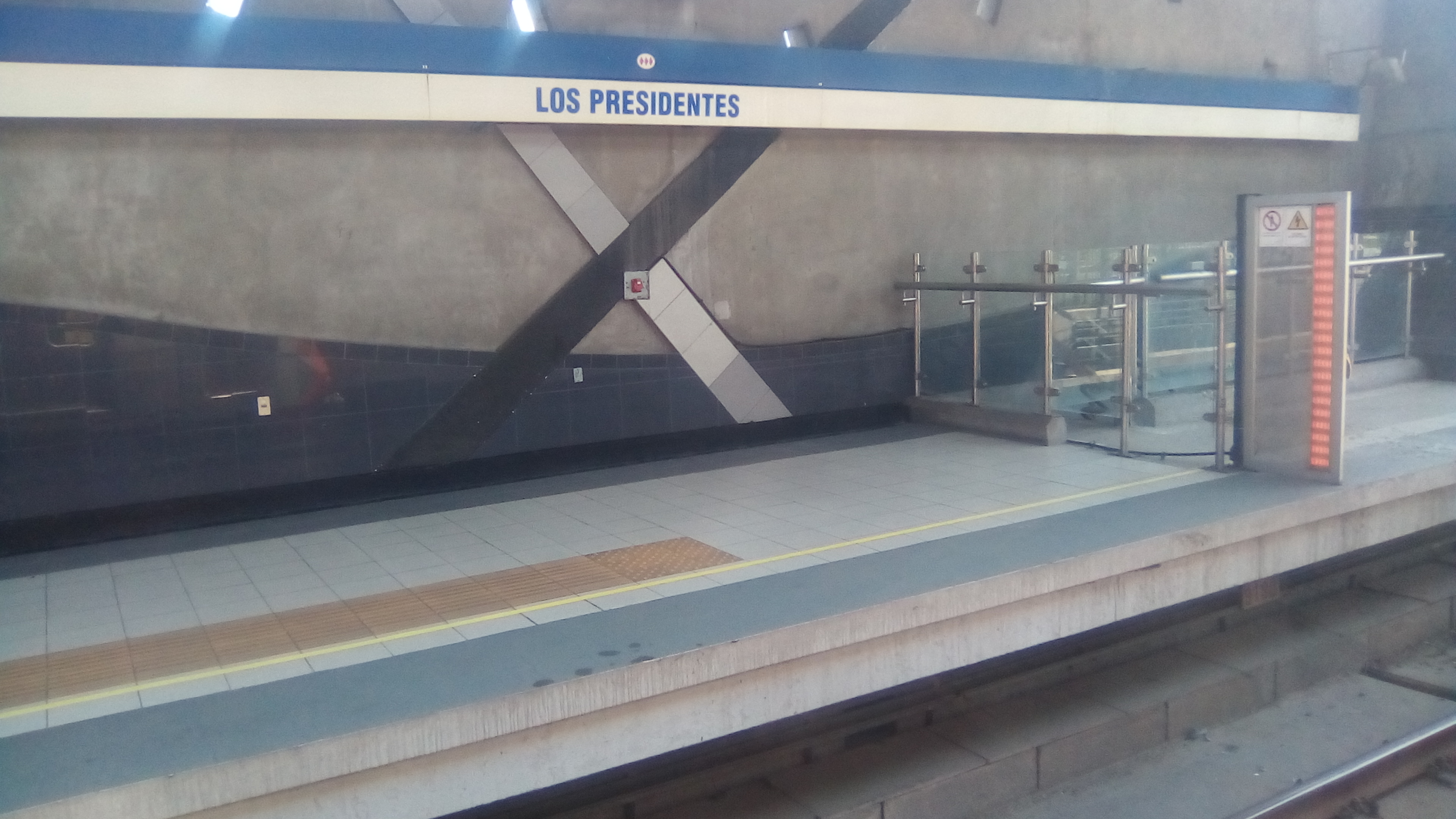

General information
- Location: Vespucio Sur Freeway / Los Presidentes Avenue
- System: Santiago rapid transit
- Line: Line 4
- Platforms: 2 side platforms
- Tracks: 2
- Connections: Transantiago buses

Construction
- Platform levels: 2
- Accessible: yes

History
- Opened: March 2, 2006

Services
Preceding station	Santiago Metro	Following station
Grecia towards Tobalaba	Line 4	Quilín towards Plaza de Puente Alto
Location

Los Presidentes station is a metro station located on Line 4 of the Santiago Metro in Santiago, Chile. It lies on the junction of Vespucio Sur Freeway and Los Presidentes Avenue. The station has disabled access. It is the northernmost ground-level station on the line, before going underground heading towards the center of the city. The area around the station is predominantly residential to the west and dominated by the Cousiño Macul vineyard to the east.

The station was opened on 2 March 2006 as part of the connection between Grecia and Vicente Valdés.

== Etymology ==
The station is named after Los Presidentes Avenue that runs west from the Vespucio Sur Freeway highway heading into Peñalolén commune.
