= Los Quillayes metro station =

Metro station in Santiago, Chile

Los Quillayes
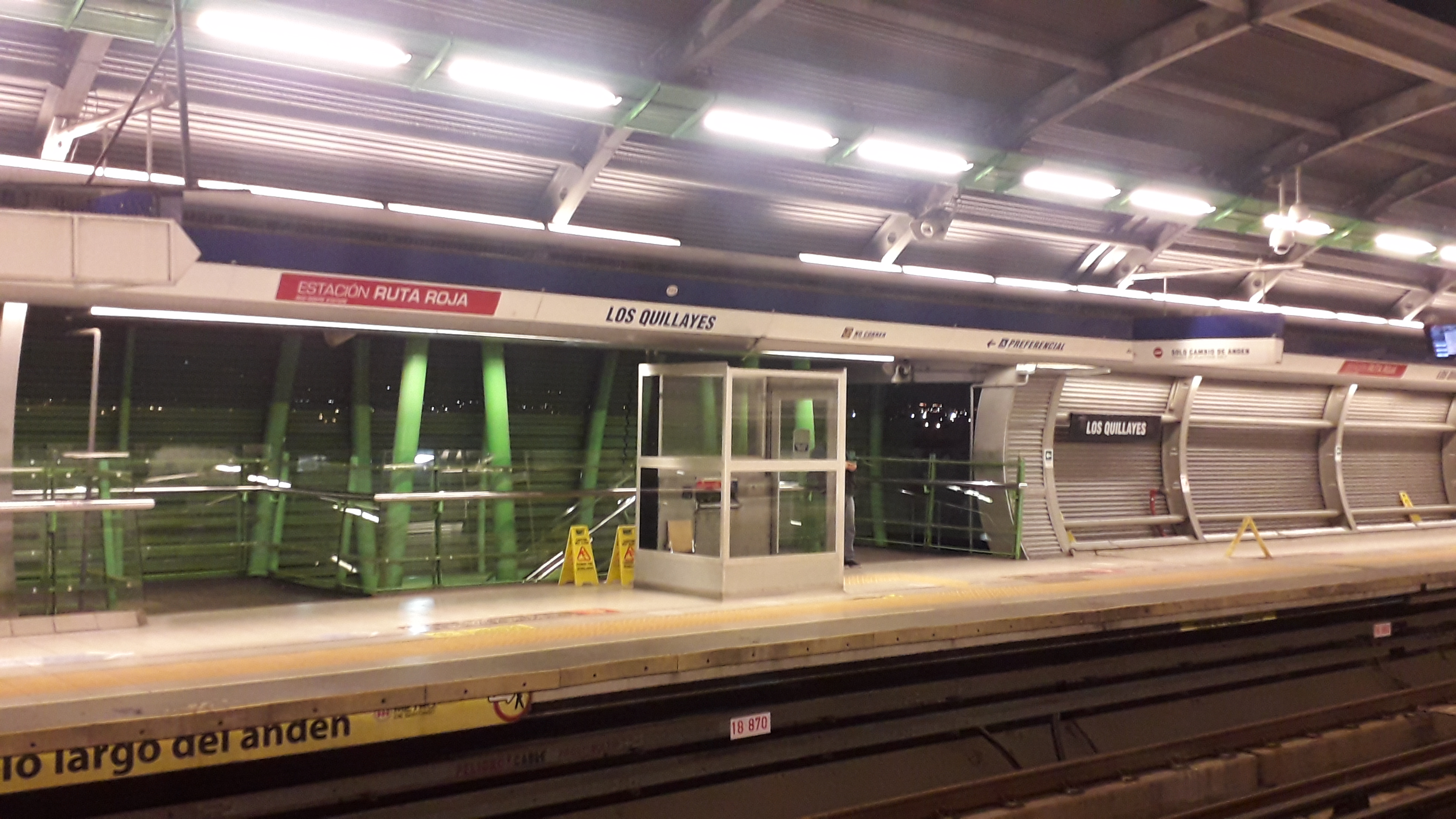

General information
- Location: Vicuña Mackenna Avenue / María Elena Street
- Coordinates: 33°33′41″S 70°35′07″W
- System: Santiago rapid transit
- Line: Line 4
- Platforms: 2 side platforms
- Tracks: 2
- Connections: Transantiago buses

Construction
- Accessible: yes

History
- Opened: November 30, 2005

Services
Preceding station	Santiago Metro	Following station
San José de la Estrella towards Tobalaba	Line 4	Elisa Correa towards Plaza de Puente Alto
Location

Los Quillayes is an elevated metro station on the Line 4 of the Santiago Metro, in Santiago, Chile. It named for the neighborhood where it is located. The station was opened on 30 November 2005 as part of the inaugural section of the line between Vicente Valdés and Plaza de Puente Alto.
