= Cristóbal Colón metro station =

Santiago metro station

Cristóbal Colón
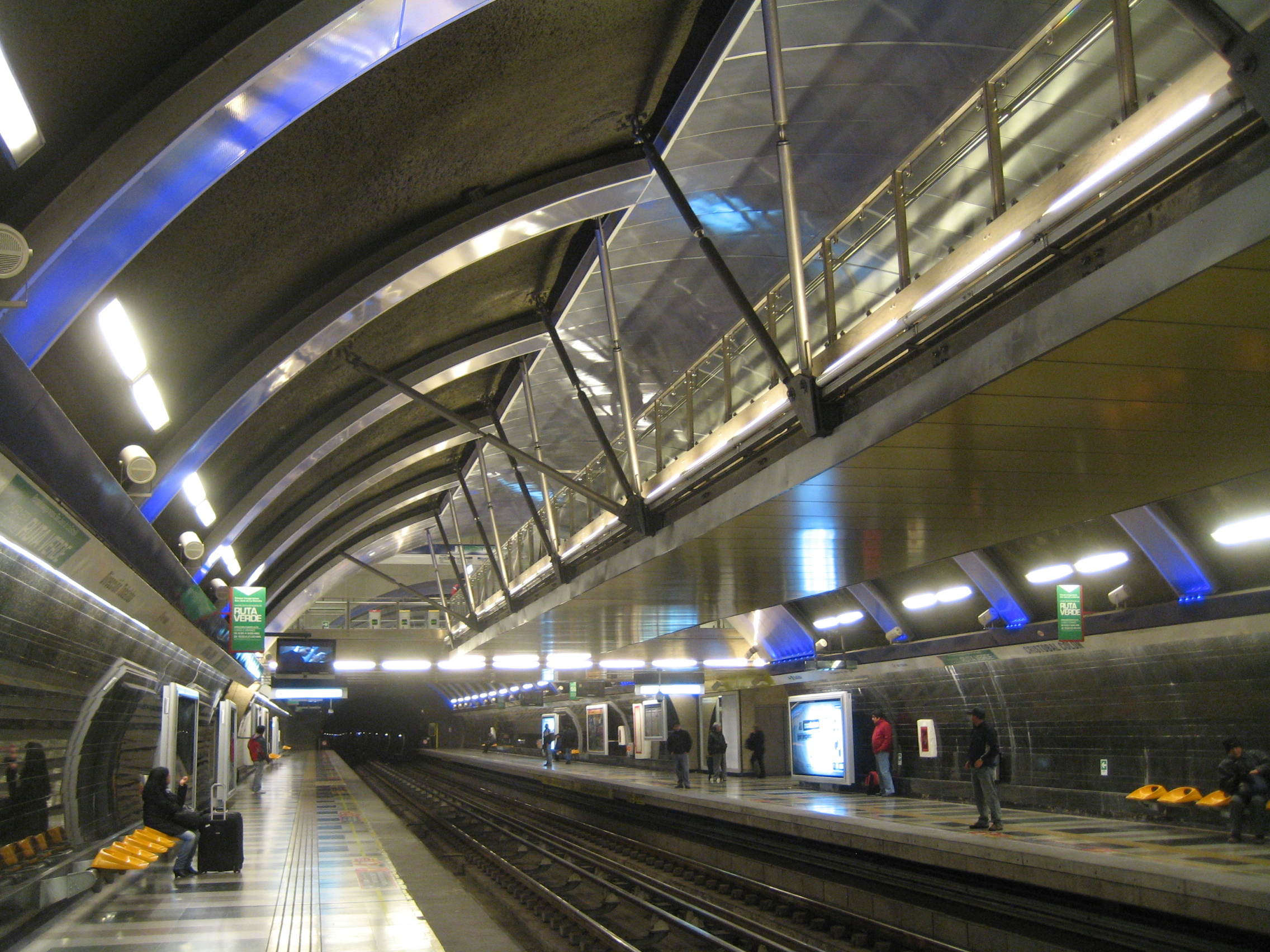

General information
- Coordinates: 33°25′34.87″S 70°35′27.96″W
- System: Santiago rapid transit
- Line: Line 4
- Platforms: 2 side platforms
- Tracks: 2
- Connections: Transantiago buses

Construction
- Accessible: yes

History
- Opened: November 30, 2005

Services
Preceding station	Santiago Metro	Following station
Tobalaba Terminus	Line 4	Francisco Bilbao towards Plaza de Puente Alto
Location

Cristóbal Colón is an underground metro station on the Line 4 of the Santiago Metro, in Santiago, Chile. This station is named for Cristóbal Colón Avenue, which in turn was named after Christopher Columbus. The station was opened on 30 November 2005 as part of the inaugural section of the line between Tobalaba and Grecia.
