= Santiago Metro Line 4 =

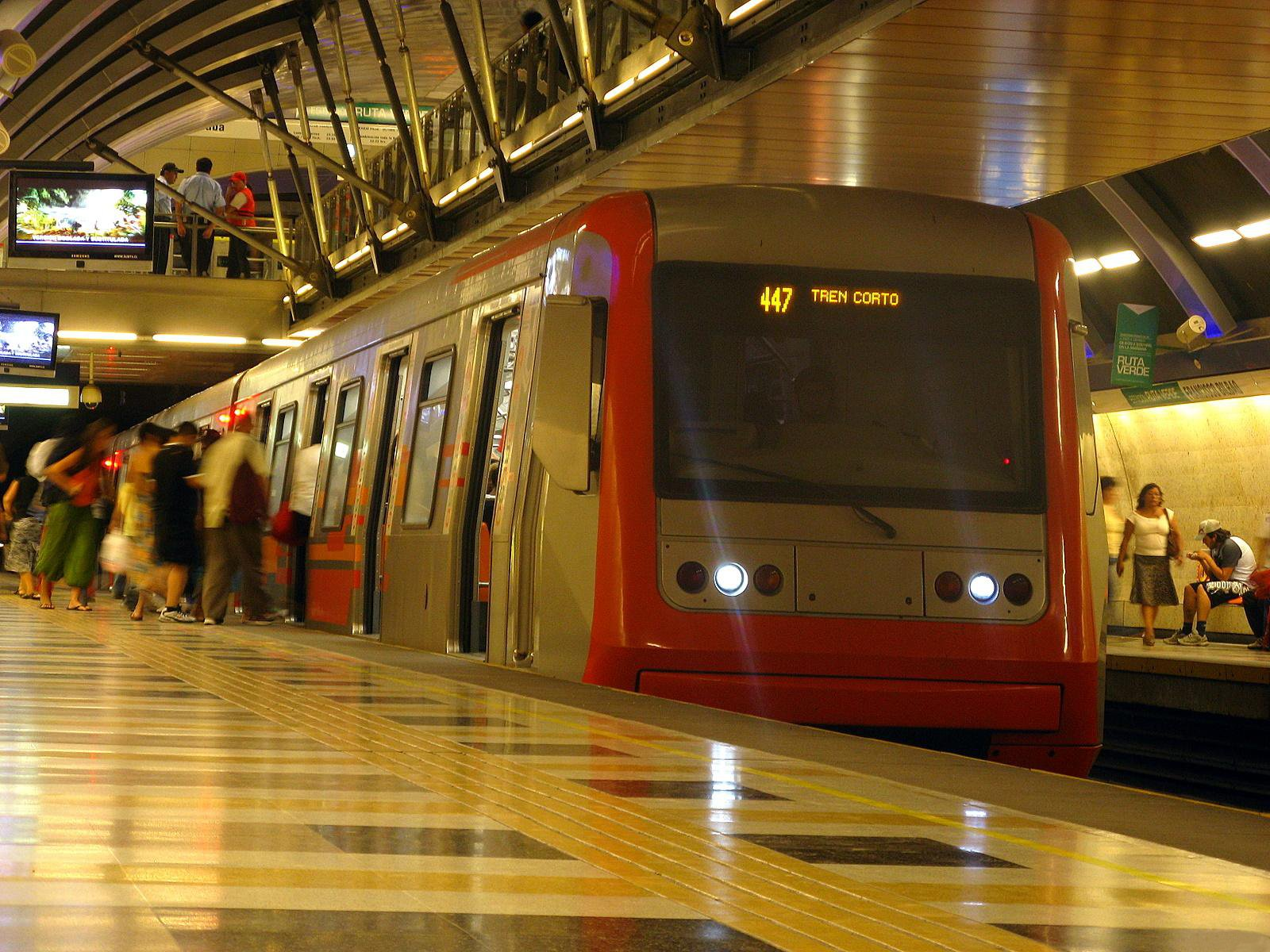
- Train at Francisco Bilbao

Overview
- Status: Operational
- Owner: Empresa de Transporte de Pasajeros Metro S.A.
- Locale: Santiago Province and Cordillera Province, western Santiago, Chile
- Termini: Tobalaba; Plaza de Puente Alto
- Stations: 23

Service
- Type: Rapid transit
- System: Santiago Metro
- Services: 1
- Operator: Empresa de Transporte de Pasajeros Metro S.A.
- Depot(s): Maintenance near Quilín, storage of trains near Las Mercedes
- Rolling stock: Alstom AS 2002
- Daily ridership: 328,200 (2015)

History
- Opened: November 30, 2005

Technical
- Line length: 24.7 km (15.3 mi)
- Number of tracks: 2
- Character: Underground, open cut, at-grade and elevated
- Track gauge: 1,435 mm (4 ft 8 1/2 in) standard gauge
- Electrification: 750 V DC third rail
- Operating speed: 80 km/h (50 mph)

Santiago Metro Line 4 is one of the seven lines that currently make up the Santiago Metro network in Santiago, Chile. It has 23 stations and 23.9 km (14.9 mi) of track. The line intersects with Line 1 at Tobalaba, with Line 3 at Plaza Egaña at northeast, and with Line 4A at Vicuña Mackenna and with Line 5 at Vicente Valdés in southeast. It will also intersect with the futures Line 8 at Macul and Line 9 at Plaza de Puente Alto. Its distinctive colour on the network line map is blue.

Since its opening, it was the only line in the system to serve areas outside Santiago Province, with the route extending into Puente Alto in Cordillera Province. It would later be joined in this aspect by Line 2, which was extended into San Bernardo, located in Maipo Province, on 23 November 2023.

In 2015, Line 4 accounted for 18.1% of all trips made on the metro system with a ridership of 328,200.

In October 2019, the line was suspended operations as a result of the 2019 Santiago protests, and various of its station were arsoned or damaged, however by 2020 all of its stations have reopened.

== History ==
Line 4 was first opened in sections, with the northern section between Tobalaba station and Grecia station and the southern section between Vicente Valdés station - Plaza de Puente Alto station being opened on November 30, 2005, by President Ricardo Lagos Escobar. The middle section between Grecia station and Vicente Valdés station was initially covered by Transantiago buses. Later, the remaining stations (Los Presidentes station, Quilín station, Las Torres station, Macul station and Vicuña Mackenna station) were opened to the public on March 2, 2006, connecting the northern and southern sections.

On December 9, 2007, an express service began to run on Line 4 at peak times, stopping at certain stations only to allow for faster journeys.

On June 1, 2018, Chilean President Sebastián Piñera announced in the public account the extension of Line 4 to the sector of Bajos de Mena in Puente Alto that will be operational in 2026. This idea was discarded however, in favour of a new layout of Line 9 announced by President Gabriel Boric in 2023 that would go through Bajos de Mena sector and connect with Line 4 at Plaza de Puente Alto.

=== San José de la Estrella: a former ghost station ===
For a long time after the inauguration of Line 4, San José de la Estrella sat as a ghost station between Trinidad and Los Quillayes, as the structure of the station was built but never finished.

After pressure from local residents and from local mayor of La Florida Pablo Zalaquett, it was announced that the station will finalize construction, with President Michelle Bachelet and Zalaquett laying the foundation stone.

The station was inaugurated on November 5th, 2009.

=== October 2019 protests ===
In October 2019, as a result of the protests caused by the rise in the subway fare, major damage occurred throughout the metro network. Line 4 was the most heavily damaged line out of all the metro's services. The Los Quillayes, San José de la Estrella, Macul, Protectora de la Infancia, Trinidad and Elisa Correa stations were completely burned; the latter two stations suffered the worst amount of damage to their structures and tracks, which would prevent normal operation of Line 4 for a period lasting 10 to 12 months. Line 4 partially reopened between Tobalaba and Quilín stations on October 28.

On November 6, the electrification of the tracks in the section between the stations Las Torres and Plaza de Puente Alto was restored, which suffered considerable damage, while evaluating the repairs to the line. On November 15, 2019, it was announced that service on the entirety of Line 4 would resume (with the exception of Vicuña Mackenna, Vicente Valdés, Hospital Sótero del Río, Las Mercedes and Plaza de Puente Alto stations) from November 18. On August 12, 2020, the Macul station was reopened. On September 14, the Elisa Correa, Los Quillayes and San José de la Estrella stations were reopened. Finally, on September 25, the Trinidad and Protectora de la Infancia stations were reopened, thus completing 100% operation at all stations.

=== Future ===
There has been proposals of expanding Line 4, one idea is to extend the line to the north through Kennedy Avenue, benefitting the neighbourhoods of Las Condes and Vitacura and allowing an easier access to shopping centres located in Kennedy Avenue. Another proposal is considering connecting the Huechuraba business district with Tobalaba station, passing under the Costanera Center and San Cristóbal Hill. However, this last idea is not likely, as the Teléferico Bicentenario will take this route (at a much lower cost), opening in 2027.

== Communes served by Line 4 ==
Line 4 serves the following communes from south to north:

- Puente Alto
- La Florida
- Peñalolen
- Macul
- Nuñoa
- La Reina
- Providencia
- Las Condes

== Tren Expreso (Express Service) ==
Stations Line 4 Santiago Metro

The skip-stop express service works during peak hours and allows trains to stop at alternate stations, reducing the number of stops and the duration of journeys. The stations on the line are divided into “green route” stations, “red route” stations and “common” stations (Spanish: estación común), where all trains stop and allow passengers to switch between red and green routes. The express service works from Monday to Friday, between 6am - 9am, 12pm - 3pm and 6pm - 9pm.

=== Red Route Stations ===
- Príncipe de Gales
- Los Orientales
- Los Presidentes
- Las Torres
- Trinidad
- Los Quillayes
- Las Mercedes

=== Green Route Stations ===
- Cristóbal Colón
- Simón Bolívar
- Grecia
- Quilín
- Rojas Magallanes
- San José de la Estrella
- Protectora de la Infancia

=== Common Stations ===
There are 9 stations where both red and green route trains stop. They are the busiest stations and give commuters the chance to change between routes.

- Tobalaba
- Francisco Bilbao
- Plaza Egaña
- Macul
- Vicuña Mackenna
- Vicente Valdés
- Elisa Correa
- Hospital Sótero del Río
- Plaza de Puente Alto

== Stations ==
Note: in this wikitable a "Province" column is also added, as the Line 4 is the only Line to leave the Santiago Province, with five stations in the Cordillera Province.

Line 4 stations from south to north are:

| Stations | Transfers | Location | Opening | Commune | Province | Notes |
|---|---|---|---|---|---|---|
| Tobalaba | Santiago Metro Line 1 | Av. Tobalaba/Avenida Apoquindo | November 30, 2005 | Providencia/Las Condes | Santiago | |
| Cristóbal Colón | | Avenida Tobalaba/Avenida Eliodoro Yáñez | November 30, 2005 | Providencia/Las Condes | Santiago | |
| Francisco Bilbao | | Avenida Tobalaba/Avenida Francisco Bilbao | November 30, 2005 | Providencia/Las Condes/La Reina | Santiago | |
| Príncipe de Gales | | Avenida Ossa/Avenida Tobalaba/Avenida Principe De Gales | November 30, 2005 | Ñuñoa/La Reina | Santiago | |
| Simón Bolívar | | Avenida Ossa/Avenida Echeñique | November 30, 2005 | Ñuñoa/La Reina | Santiago | |
| Plaza Egaña | Santiago Metro Line 3 | Avenida Ossa/Avenida Irarrázaval | November 30, 2005 | Ñuñoa/La Reina | Santiago | |
| Los Orientales | | Vespucio Sur highway/Avenida Oriental | November 30, 2005 | Ñuñoa/Peñalolén | Santiago | |
| Grecia | | Vespucio Sur highway/Avenida Grecia | November 30, 2005 | Ñuñoa/Macul/Peñalolén | Santiago | |
| Los Presidentes | | Vespucio Sur highway/Avenida Los Presidentes | March 2, 2006 | Macul/Peñalolén | Santiago | |
| Quilín | | Vepsucio Sur highway/Avenida Quilín | March 2, 2006 | Macul/Peñalolén | Santiago | |
| Las Torres | | Vepsucio Sur highway/Avenida Las Torres | March 2, 2006 | Macul/Peñalolén | Santiago | |
| Macul | | Vespucio Sur highway/Avenida La Florida | March 2, 2006 | Macul/Peñalolén/La Florida | Santiago | This station will be future combination with the line in 2030. |
| Vicuña Mackenna | Santiago Metro Line 4A | Vespucio Sur highway/Julio Vildosola | March 2, 2006 | La Florida | Santiago | Vicuña Mackenna is the only station in the system with at least one island platform, having two. |
| Vicente Valdés | Santiago Metro Line 5 | Avenida Vicuña Mackenna/Vicente Valdés | November 30, 2005 | La Florida | Santiago | |
| Rojas Magallanes | | Avenida Vicuña Mackenna /Rojas Magallanes | November 30, 2005 | La Florida | Santiago | |
| Trinidad | | Avenida Vicuña Mackenna/Avenida Trinidad | November 30, 2005 | La Florida | Santiago | |
| San José de la Estrella | | Avenida Vicuña Mackenna/Avenida San José de la Estrella | November 5, 2009 | La Florida | Santiago | |
| Los Quillayes | | Avenida Vicuña Mackenna/Maria Elena | November 30, 2005 | La Florida | Santiago | |
| Elisa Correa | | Avenida Concha y Toro/Elisa Correa | November 30, 2005 | La Florida/Puente Alto | Santiago/Cordillera | |
| Hospital Sótero del Rio | | Avenida Concha y Toro/Hospital Sótero del Rio | November 30, 2005 | Puente Alto | Cordillera | |
| Protectora de la Infancia | | Avenida Concha y Toro/Ángel Pimentel | November 30, 2005 | Puente Alto | Cordillera | |
| Las Mercedes | | Avenida Concha y Toro/Independencia | November 30, 2005 | Puente Alto | Cordillera | |
| Plaza de Puente Alto | | Avenida Concha y Toro /Manuel Rodríguez | November 30, 2005 | Puente Alto | Cordillera | |

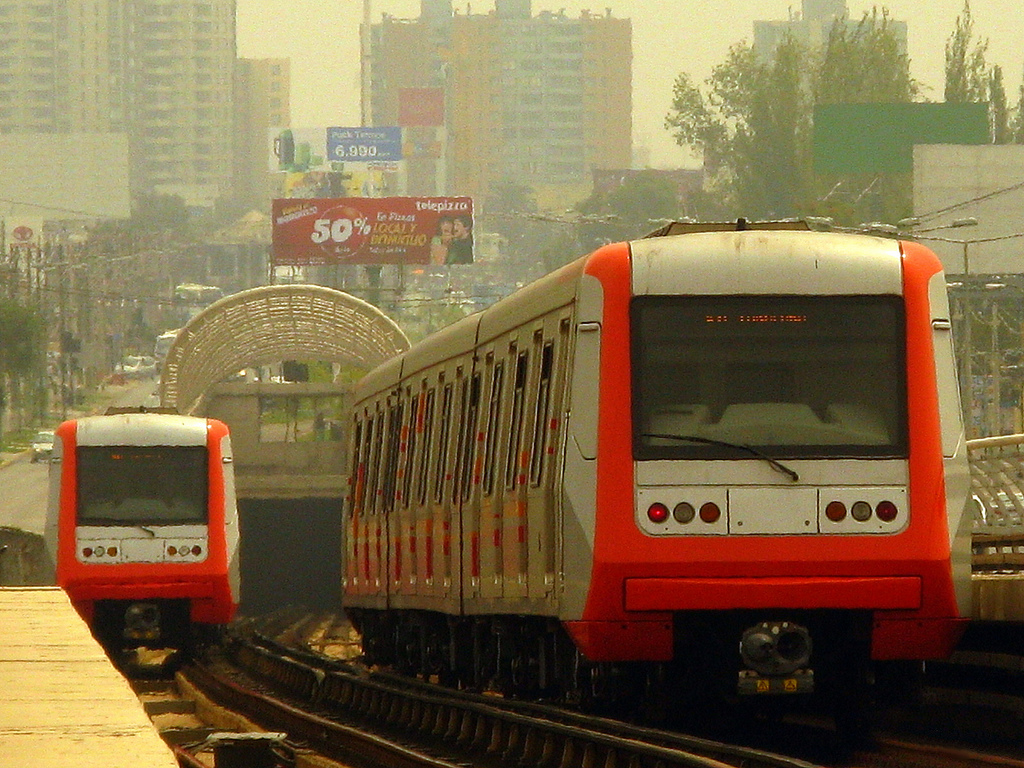
Two AS-2002 trains near Rojas Magallanes.

== Line 4 Data Sheet ==
- Communes:
  - Las Condes
  - Providencia
  - La Reina
  - Ñuñoa
  - Peñalolén
  - Macul
  - La Florida
  - Puente Alto
- Track:
  - Tobalaba Avenue: 3 stations
  - Ossa Avenue: 3 stations
  - Américo Vespucio Avenue: 7 stations
  - Vicuña Mackenna Avenue: 6 stations.
  - Concha y Toro Avenue: 5 stations.
- Construction Method:
  - Tobalaba – Grecia: Underground.
  - Los Presidentes: At grade.
  - Quilín: Open cut.
  - Las Torres: At grade.
  - Macul: Viaduct.
  - Vicuña Mackenna – Vicente Valdés: Underground.
  - Rojas Magallanes – Protectora de la Infancia: Viaduct.
  - Las Mercedes – Plaza de Puente Alto: Underground.
- Opening Dates:
  - Tobalaba – Grecia: November 2005.
  - Vicente Valdés - Plaza de Puente Alto: November 2005.
  - Los Presidentes -Vicuña Mackenna: March 2006.
  - San José de la Estrella (infill station): November 2009

== See also ==
- List of metro systems
- Rail transport in Chile
- Transantiago
