= Rojas Magallanes metro station =

Santiago metro station

Rojas Magallanes
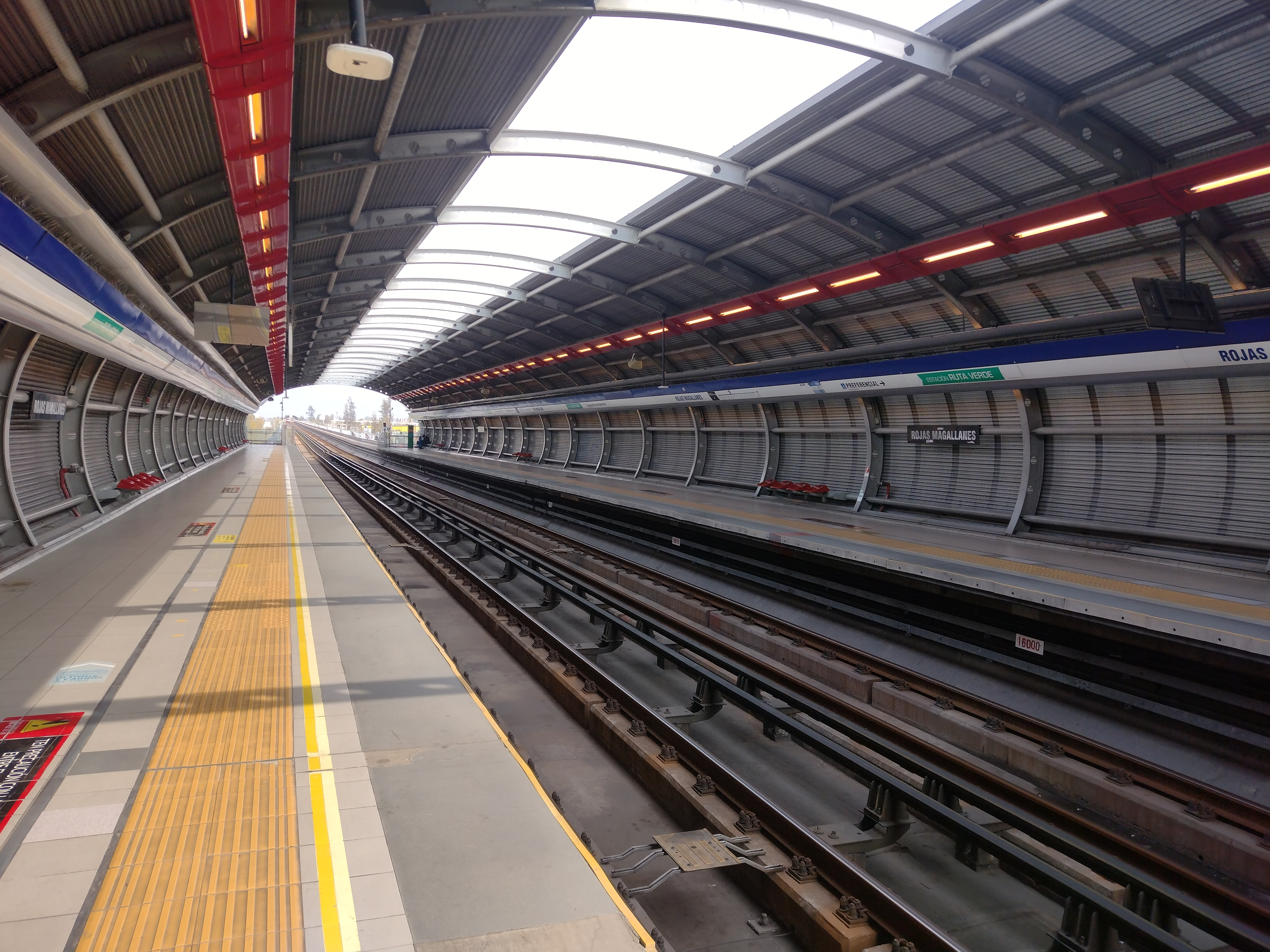

General information
- Location: Vicuña Mackenna Avenue / Rojas Magallanes Street
- Coordinates: 33°32′10.60″S 70°35′33.63″W
- System: Santiago rapid transit
- Line: Line 4
- Platforms: 2 side platforms
- Tracks: 2
- Connections: Transantiago buses

Construction
- Accessible: yes

History
- Opened: November 30, 2005

Services
Preceding station	Santiago Metro	Following station
Vicente Valdés towards Tobalaba	Line 4	Trinidad towards Plaza de Puente Alto
Location

Rojas Magallanes is an elevated metro station on the Line 4 of the Santiago Metro, in Santiago, Chile. The station has two side platforms and two tracks on a precast concrete segmental viaduct with single central columns. It is enclosed in a tubular structure with elliptical cross section, from which protrude two balcony-like structures containing stairs that lead to the mezzanine level.

The station was opened on 30 November 2005 as part of the inaugural section of the line between Vicente Valdés and Plaza de Puente Alto.
