= Trinidad metro station =

Santiago metro station

Trinidad
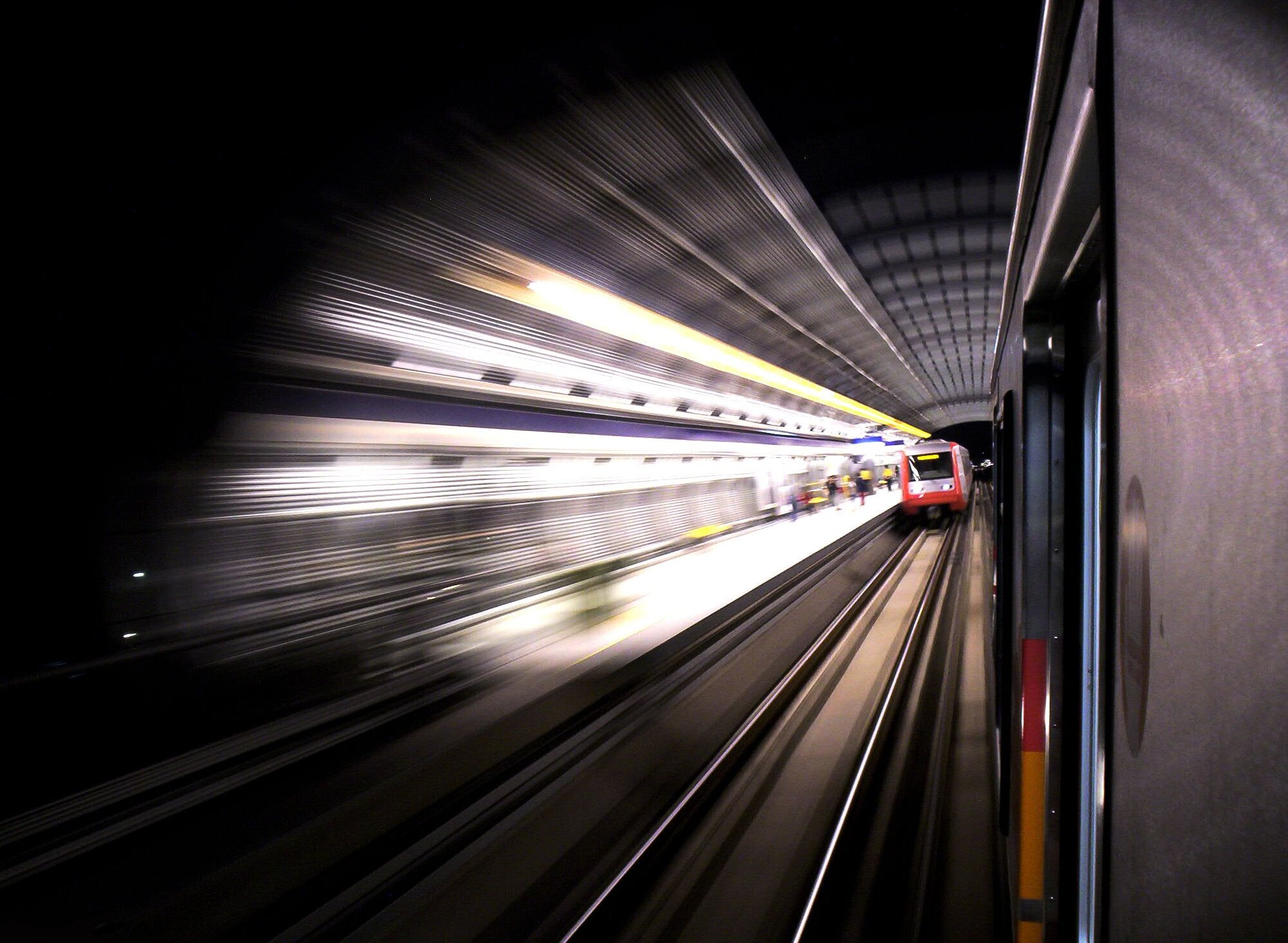

General information
- Location: Vicuña Mackenna Avenue / Trinidad Street
- Coordinates: 33°32′45.55″S 70°35′17.81″W
- System: Santiago rapid transit
- Line: Line 4
- Platforms: 2 side platforms
- Tracks: 2
- Connections: Transantiago buses

Construction
- Accessible: yes

History
- Opened: 30 November 2005

Services
Preceding station	Santiago Metro	Following station
Rojas Magallanes towards Tobalaba	Line 4	San José de la Estrella towards Plaza de Puente Alto
Location

Trinidad is an elevated metro station on the Line 4 of the Santiago Metro, in Santiago, Chile. The side platforms and tracks are wrapped in a large elliptical cross section tube. The station has a mezzanine area below the tracks. The station was opened on 30 November 2005 as part of the inaugural section of the line between Vicente Valdés and Plaza de Puente Alto.
