= Cordillera Province, Chile =

Cordillera Province Provincia de Cordillera
- Province
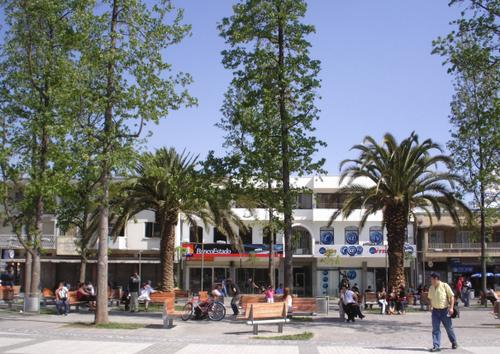
- Puente Alto

- Seal

- Location in the Santiago Metropolitan Region Region

- Location in Chile
- Coordinates: 33°43′S 70°14′W
- Country: Chile
- Region: Santiago Metropolitan Region
- Capital: Puente Alto
- Communes: See article

Government
  - Type: Provincial

Area
  - Total: 5,528.3 km^{2} (2,134.5 sq mi)

Population (2024 Census)
  - Total: 614,587
  - Density: 111.17/km^{2} (287.93/sq mi)
- Time zone: UTC−4 (CLT)
  - Summer (DST): UTC-3 (CLST)
- Area code: 56 + 2
- Website: Delegation of Cordillera

Cordillera Province (Spanish: Provincia de Cordillera) is one of six provinces of the Santiago Metropolitan Region in central Chile. It spans an area of 5,528.3 km^{2} (2,134.5 sq mi). Its capital is Puente Alto. It had a population of 614,587 inhabitants as per the 2024 Chilean census.

== Etymology ==
"Cordillera" is derived from Spanish and means a chain or system of parallel mountain ranges. It comes from the Old Spanish word "cordilla" meaning "little rope" or "string", which itself is derived from the Latin word "chorda".

== History ==
Chile was re-organized into twelve regions excluding the Santiago Metropolitan Area by Law No. 575 enacted on 10 July 1974. The Santiago Metropolitan Region was officially created as per Law No.3260, enacted on 3 March 1980, and was made up of six provinces including Cordillera.

== Geography ==
Cordillera Province is one of the six provinces of the Santiago Metropolitan Region in Chile. It covers an area of 5,528.3 km^{2} (2,134.5 sq mi). Most of the land area of the province belongs to the Maipo River basin. Only about 16,000 ha (40,000 acres) of the province is covered by forests, which forms three percent of the total land area.

The region has a warm Mediterranean climate (Köppen climate classification: Csb), with the capital recording an average annual temperature of 16.24 °C (61.23 °F), and receiving approximately 3.3 cm (1.3 in) of rainfall annually. However, surface temperatures in the summer reach 35 °C (95 °F) in the province.

== Administration ==
As a province, Cordillera is a second-level administrative division of Chile, governed by a provincial governor. It is further subdivided into three communes (comunas)–Pirque, Puente Alto and San José de Maipo. The city of Puente Alto serves as the capital of the province.

== Demographics ==
According to the 2024 Chilean census, the province had a population of 614,587 inhabitants. The population consisted of 317,586 females (51.7%) and 297,001 males (48.3%). About 18.3% of the population was below the age of 15 years, 69.7% belonged to the age group of 15–64 years, and 11.9% was aged 65 years or older. The province had an urban population of 592,218 inhabitants (96.4%) and a rural population of 22,369 inhabitants (3.6%). Most of the residents were born in Chile, accounting for 583,367 inhabitants (94.9%). Indigenous people formed 54,581 inhabitants (8.9%) of the population, while 559,949 inhabitants (91.1%) identified themselves as non-indigenous. Roman Catholics formed the largest religious group with 251,003 adherents (50.3%), followed by Evangelicals or Protestants with 70,001 adherents (14.0%), and 155,389 inhabitants (31.1%) indicating no religious affiliation.
