= La Florida, Chile =

Commune in Santiago Metropolitan Region, Chile

La Florida
- Commune
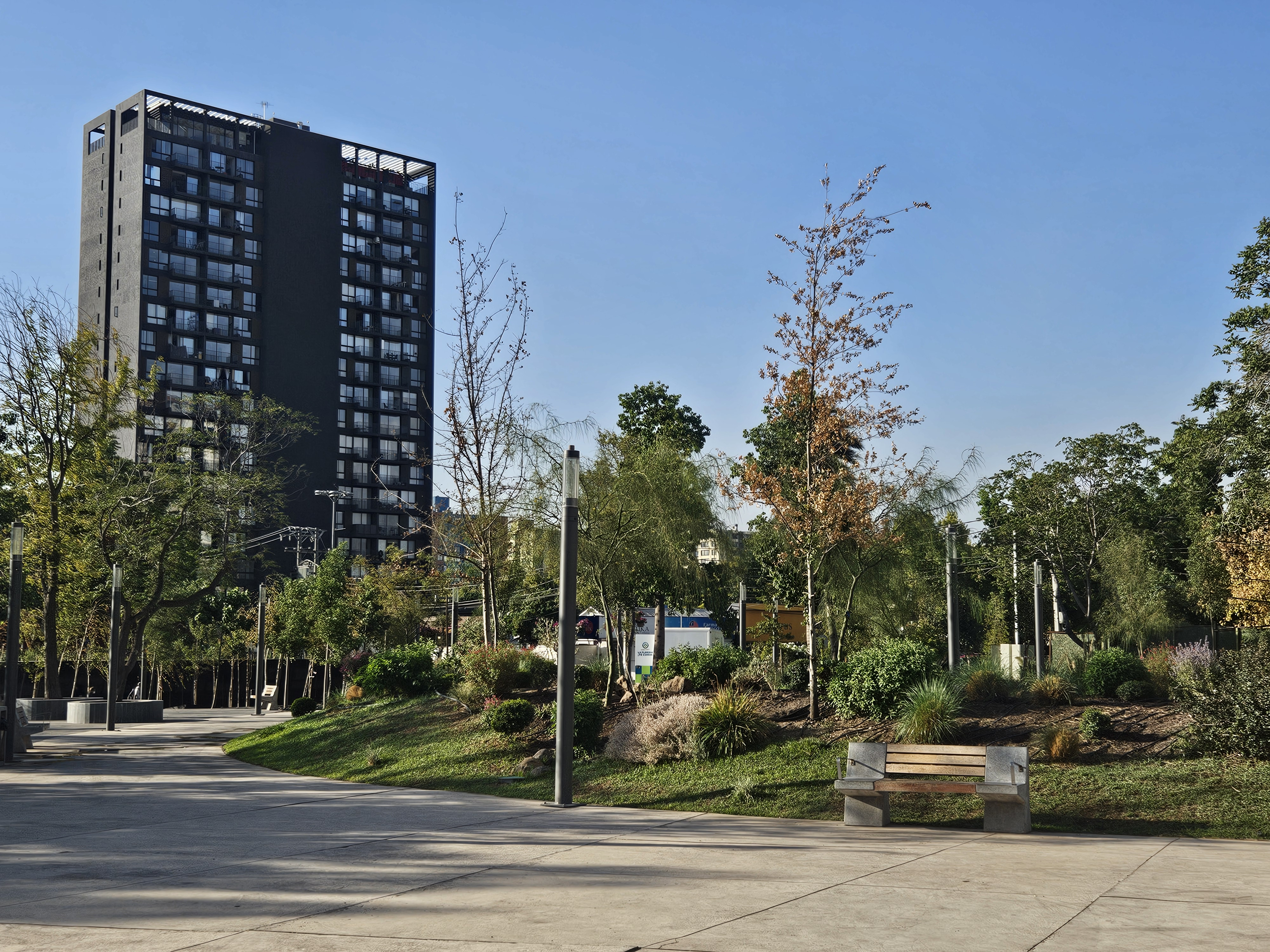
- Civic center

- Flag Coat of arms Map of La Florida within Greater Santiago Location in Chile
- Coordinates (city): 33°32′S 70°35′W
- Country: Chile
- Region: Santiago Metro.
- Province: Santiago
- Founded: 28 November 1899

Government
  - Type: Municipality
  - Alcalde: Daniel Reyes Morales (UDI)

Area
  - Total: 70.8 km^{2} (27.3 sq mi)

Population (2024)
  - Total: 374,836
  - Density: 5,290/km^{2} (13,700/sq mi)
  - Urban: 374,713
  - Rural: 123
- Time zone: UTC-4 (CLT)
  - Summer (DST): UTC-3 (CLST)
- Area code: 56 +
- Website: Municipality of La Florida

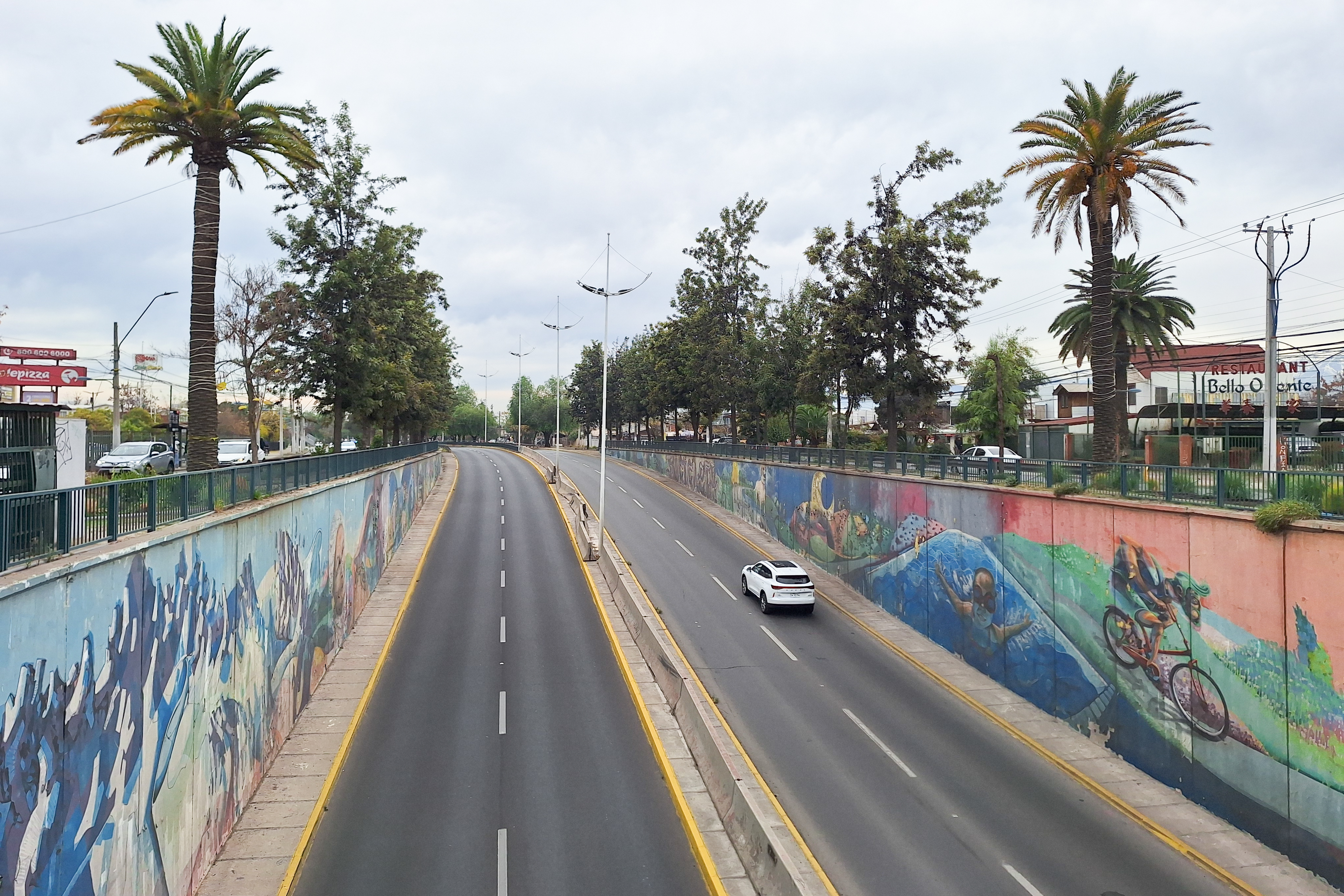
La Florida Avenue

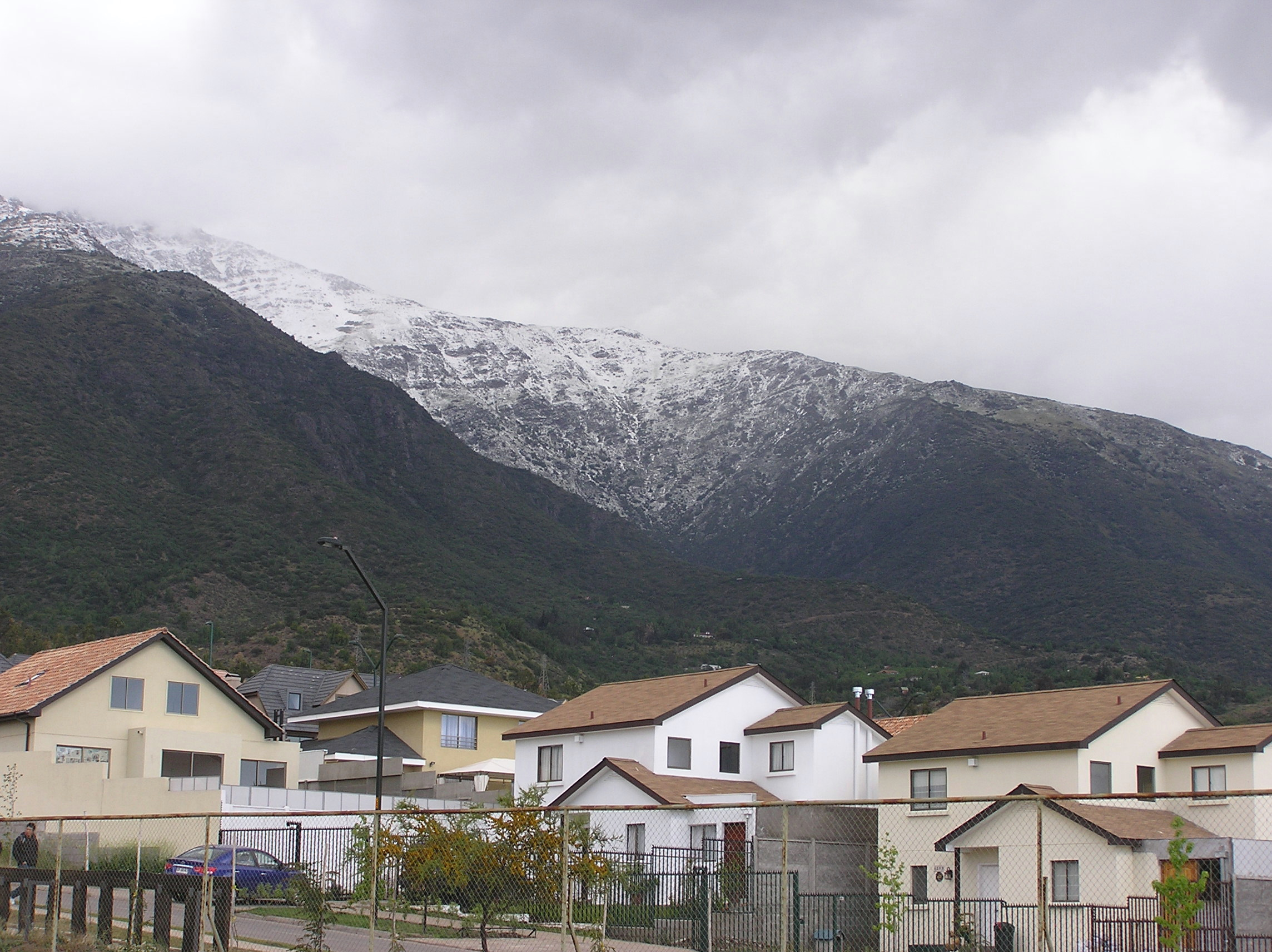
Alto Macul neighborhood

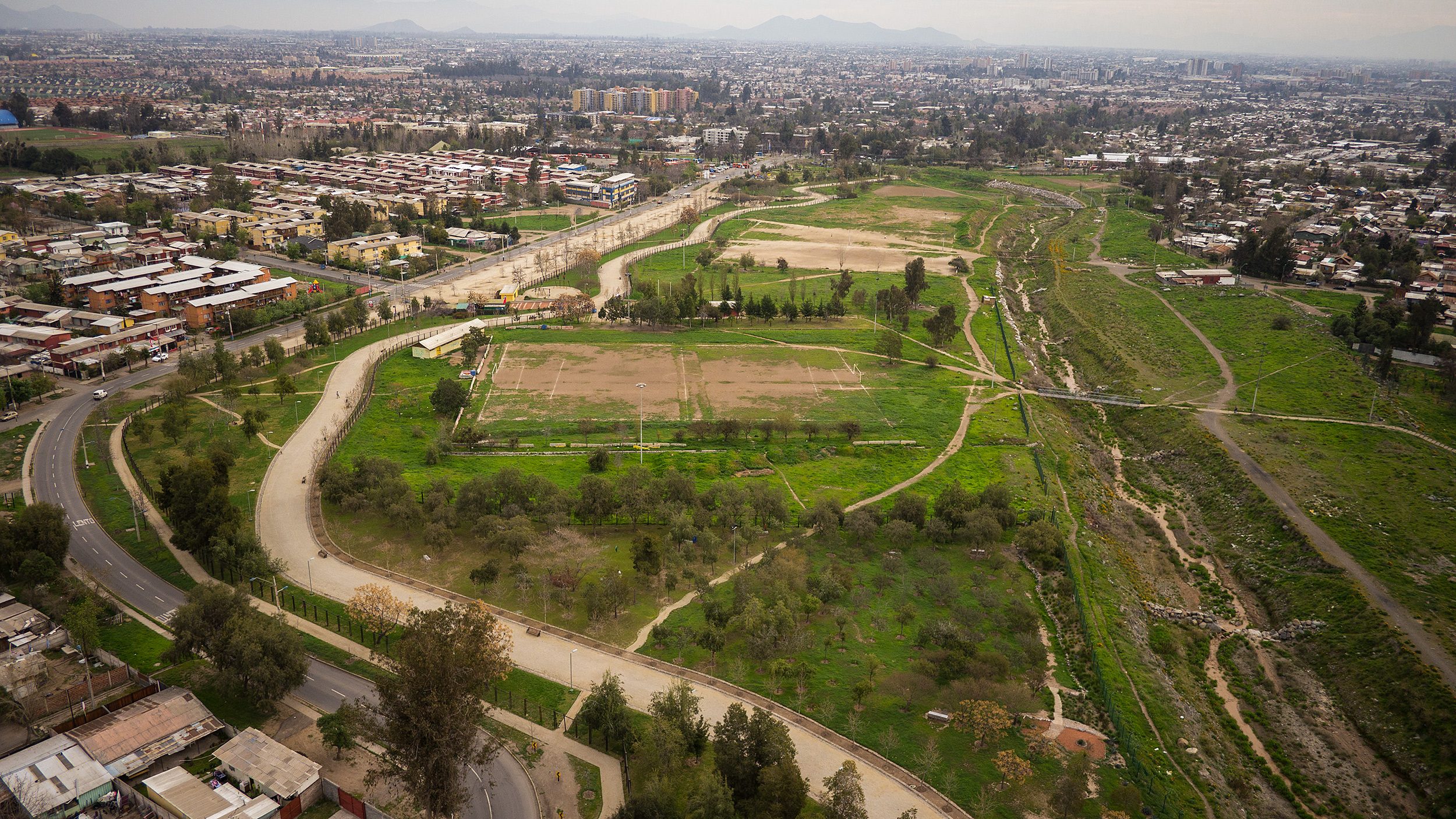
Quebrada de Macul park in 2013

La Florida (Spanish pronunciation: [la floˈɾiða], Spanish for "the flowery") is an urban-suburban commune in the southeast of Santiago, the capital and largest city of Chile. It is a residential area and its 374,836 inhabitants are mostly members of a new middle to upper-middle class. It ranks number 12 out of 346 among Chilean communes in terms of Human Development Index, and is the 5th-largest commune by population after Puente Alto, Maipú, Santiago and Antofagasta.

== Demographics ==
As of the 2024 census, the population is 374,836, of which 47.6% are male and 52.4% are female. People under 15 years old make up 15.7% of the population, and people over 65 years old make up 16.2%. 99.9% of the population is urban and 0.1% is rural.

Historical population

Year	Pop.	±% p.a.
1875	692	—
1885	802	+1.49%
1895	879	+0.92%
1907	1,243	+2.93%
1920	1,860	+3.15%
1930	3,009	+4.93%
1940	4,685	+4.53%

Year	Pop.	±% p.a.
1952	9,889	+6.42%
1970	58,698	+10.40%
1982	191,883	+10.37%
1992	328,881	+5.54%
2002	365,674	+1.07%
2017	366,916	+0.02%
2024	374,836	+0.31%

Source: INE, Memoria Chilena

- Population below poverty line: 3.1% (2015)
- Regional quality of life index: 80.21, high, 13 out of 52 (2005)
- Human Development Index: 0.773, 12 out of 346 (2005)

=== Immigration ===
As of the 2024 census, immigrants make up 9.8% of the population - 8.9% are from South America, 0.6% from North America, 0.1% from Europe, 0.1% from Asia, 0.01% from Africa, and 0.01% from Oceania.

== Administration ==
As a commune, La Florida is a third-level administrative division of Chile administered by a municipal council, headed by an alcalde who is directly elected every four years. Its mayor for the 2024-2028 term is Daniel Reyes Morales (UDI). The local council has the following members:

Conservatives (6)

- Felipe Mancilla Mejías (RN)
- Renata Santander Ramírez (RN)
- Leticia Lagos Vidal (RN)
- Hugo Herrera Baeza (RN)
- Alejandra Parra Galasso (UDI)
- Martina Díaz Carrasco (REP)

Social Democrats (4)

- Reinaldo Rosales Méndez (PDD)
- Lia Gálvez Fuentes (FA)
- José Seves Rojas (PC)
- Victoria Oyarzún Carvajal (PC)

Within the electoral divisions of Chile, La Florida is represented in the Chamber of Deputies by Gustavo Hasbún (UDI) and Camila Vallejo-Dowling (PC) as part of the 26th District, which consists entirely of the La Florida commune. It is represented in the Senate by Manuel José Ossandón (Conservative independent) and Carlos Montes (PS) as part of the 8th Senatorial Constituency (East Santiago).

== Education ==
An English school, the American–British School of La Florida is located in the commune. The area previously had a German school, the Deutsche Marienschule Santiago-La Florida.
