= Puente Alto =

- City and Commune
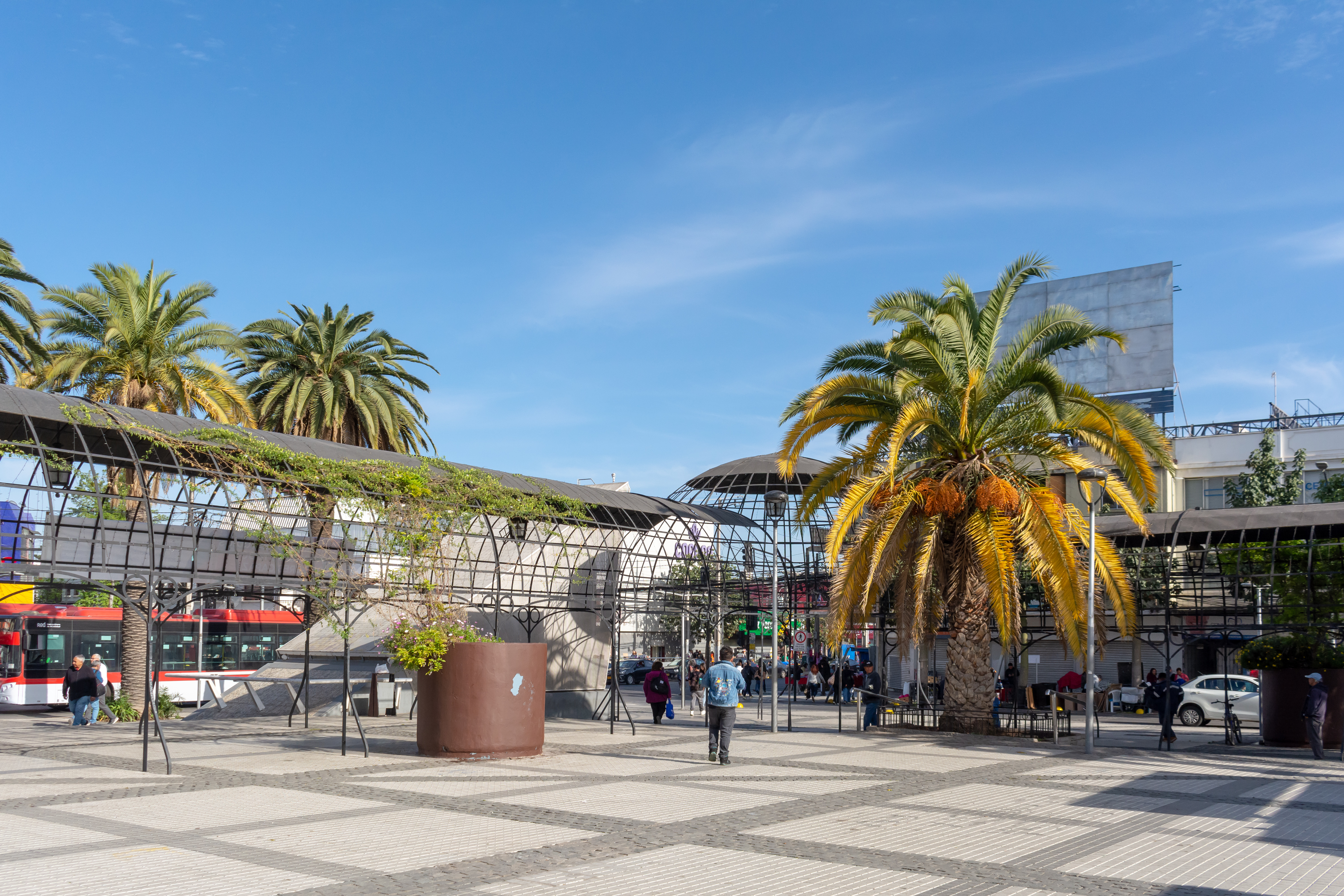
- Puente Alto's main square in 2023

- Coat of arms Location in Chile
- Coordinates (city): 33°37′S 70°34′W
- Country: Chile
- Region: Santiago
- Province: Cordillera
- Founded: 1898

Government
  - Type: Municipality
  - Alcalde: Matias Toledo (Ind.)

Area
  - Total: 88.2 km^{2} (34.1 sq mi)
- Elevation: 673 m (2,208 ft)

Population (2024)
  - Total: 568,086
  - Density: 6,440/km^{2} (16,700/sq mi)
  - Urban: 568,068
  - Rural: 18
- Time zone: UTC-4 (CLT)
  - Summer (DST): UTC-3 (CLST)
- Area code: country 56 + city 2
- Website: Municipality of Puente Alto

Puente Alto (Spanish: "Tall Bridge") is a city and commune of Chile. It is the capital of the Cordillera Province in the Santiago Metropolitan Region, and is located in the south-east corner of the Greater Santiago conurbation. It has a population of 568,086, making it the most populous commune of Chile.

== History ==
After 1884, the Province of Santiago was divided into three departments: Santiago, La Victoria, and Melipilla.

In 1891, the "Autonomic Commune Law" was enacted, after which the president issued the Decree for the Creation of Municipalities of Chile.

Following this decree, in 1891, the municipalities of Peñaflor, Talagante, Calera de Tango, San José de Maipo, and Lo Cañas were established in the department of La Victoria. On November 18, 1892, the municipalities of Puente Alto and La Granja were created in the same department, leading to the dissolution of the municipality of Lo Cañas.

Thus, the Municipality of Puente Alto, which included the subdelegations 12th, Puente Nuevo de Pirque, 15th, Lo Cañas, and 16th, El Peral from the Department of La Victoria, was officially established by law on November 18, 1892, and published in the Official Gazette No. 4376 of 1892.

According to the Autonomic Commune Law, the municipality's governing body consisted of at least nine councilors, with the number increasing proportionally to the population, and three mayors. This system granted the municipalities greater autonomy and more powers, allowing them to operate more independently from the central government.

A letter from the Mayor's Office of Puente Alto to the Governor of the Department of La Victoria, dated May 15, 1894, reveals the first mayors of the commune:

"It being convenient for Your Honor to be informed about the organization of the Municipality of Puente Alto for the relations between it and your government, I have the honor to inform Your Honor that in the first ordinary session, Don Carlos Aldunate Solar was appointed as the first mayor, Don Victorino Rojas Magallanes as the second, and Don Rafael Correa Echagüe as the third. This I communicate to Your Honor for any necessary action. God guide Your Honor."

== Demographics ==
Historical population
Year	Pop.	±% p.a.
1875	3,812	—
1885	4,212	+1.00%
1895	4,662	+1.02%
1907	5,668	+1.64%
1920	5,830	+0.22%
1930	8,873	+4.29%
1940	20,009	+8.47%
1952	32,599	+4.15%
1960	69,083	+9.84%
1970	76,694	+1.05%
1982	113,211	+3.30%
1992	254,673	+8.44%
2002	493,722	+6.84%
2017	568,106	+0.94%
2024	568,086	−0.00%
Population size may be affected by changes in administrative divisions. Source: INE, Memoria Chilena

As of the 2024 census, the commune has a population of 568,086, of which 48.2% are male and 51.8% are female. People under 15 years old make up 18.4% of the population, and people over 65 years old make up 11.7%. 99.9% of the population is urban and 0.1% is rural.

=== Immigration ===
As of the 2024 census, immigrants make up 5.2% of the population - 4.5% are from South America, 0.6% from North America, 0.1% from Europe, 0.1% from Asia, 0.005% from Africa, and 0.002% from Oceania.

== Administration ==
As a commune, Puente Alto is a third-level administrative division of Chile administered by a municipal council, headed by an alcalde (mayor) who is directly elected every four years. The mayor for the 2024-2028 term is Matias Toledo (Ind). The communal council has the following members:

- Oliver Mellado Rodríguez (RN)
- Andrés Codina Powers (Ind/RN)
- Tatiana Campos Contreras (RN)
- Víctor Manuel Castro Fredes (REP)
- Macarena Gárate González (PS)
- Pola Montoya Videla (PEV)
- Constanza Meneares Gutiérrez (FA)
- Carolina García Fuente (PH)
- Denisse Hermosilla Carvallo (PC)

Within the electoral divisions of Chile, Puente Alto is represented in the Chamber of Deputies by Álvaro Carter (UDI), Ximena Ossandón (RN), Daniela Serrano (PCCh), Ana María Gazmuri (AH), Mónica Arce Castro (Ind/PH), Pamela Jiles (PH) and Hernán Palma Pérez (PH), as part of the 12th electoral district, (together with La Florida, Pirque, San José de Maipo and La Pintana). The commune is represented in the Senate by Manuel José Ossandón Irarrázaval (RN), Fabiola Campillai Rojas (Ind), Claudia Pascual (PCCh), Luciano Cruz Coke (EVOP) and Jose Manuel Rojo Edwards (PRCh) as part of the 7th senatorial constituency (Santiago Metropolitan Region).

== Transportation ==
Puente Alto is connected to the rest of Santiago though the Red Metropolitana de Mobilidad, which includes bus lines and Line 4 of the Santiago Metro, which has its southern terminus on Plaza de Puente Alto station, beneath the commune's main square. Travel time to downtown Santiago via the metro is approximately 45 minutes. In the future, it will also be connected to Line 8 and Line 9 of the metro.

== Areas of Interest ==
=== Estadio Municipal ===
Puente Alto's city stadium is located at 450 Nemesio Vicuña and features a football field and an athletics track. The stadium has a capacity of 1900, making it one of the biggest sports centers of the commune.

On May 30, 2011, the city stadium was re-inaugurated by the Mayor Manuel J. Ossandón.

=== Mampato amusement park ===
Mampato is an amusement park with various activities for children and teenagers. Its main attractions include the trains, the trampolines and tricycles. It was inaugurated in 1998 in Las Vizcachas, Puente Alto.

=== Pueblito Las Vizcachas ===
"Pueblito las Vizcachas" is a large, well-maintained park in Puente Alto frequented by families and residents in the area. The park opened on December 30, 2015. Visitors have the opportunity to partake in kayaking, interact with farm animals and enjoy other activities in the green areas without paying an entrance fee.

== Gallery ==
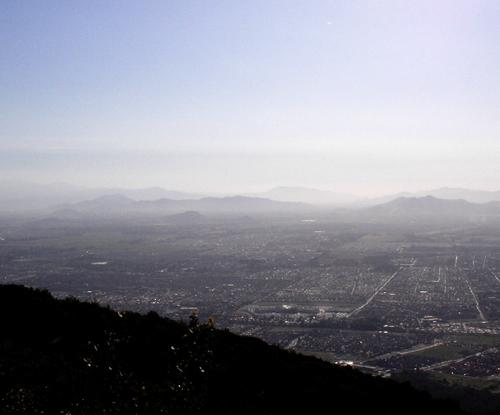
North of Puente Alto

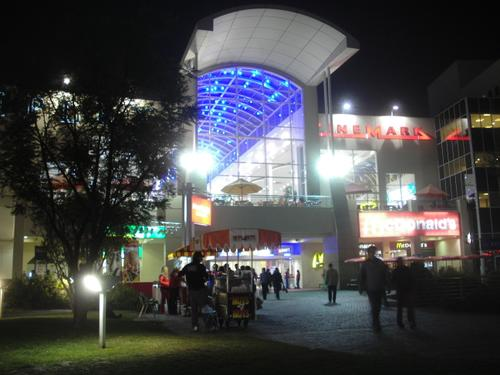
Mall Plaza Tobalaba

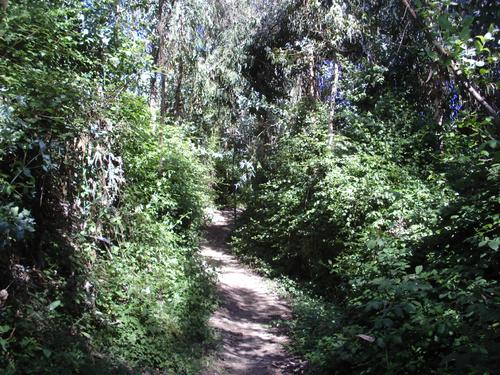
Trail in the Puentealtina Pre-cordillerana Reserve, in eastern Puente Alto

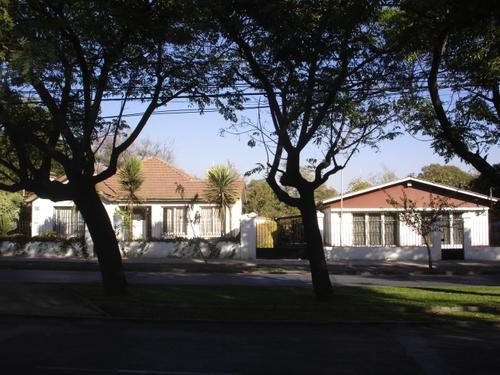
An old-style neighbourhood typical to Puente Alto, near the civic centre.

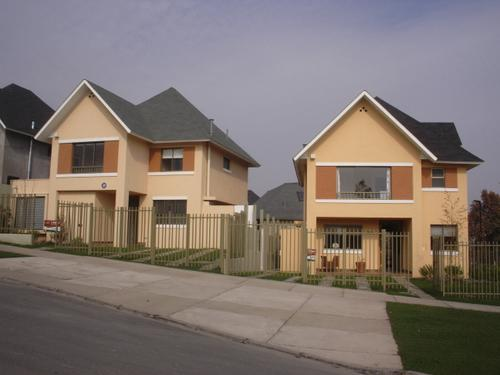
Monte Andino, an upper middle class neighbourhood located in the northeast part of the commune. It follows the same style as other neighbourhoods in that area.

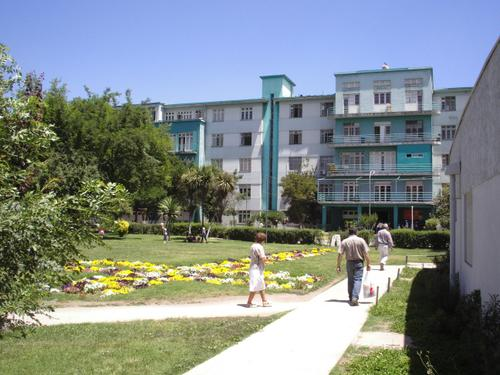
Sótero del Río Hospital

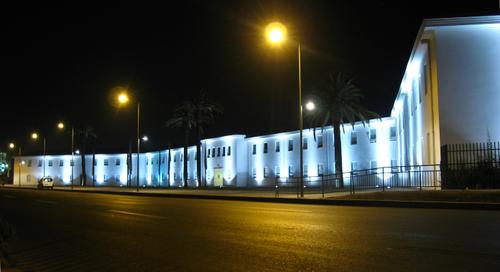
Town hall

== See also ==
- Bajos de Mena
