= Grecia metro station =

Santiago metro station

Grecia
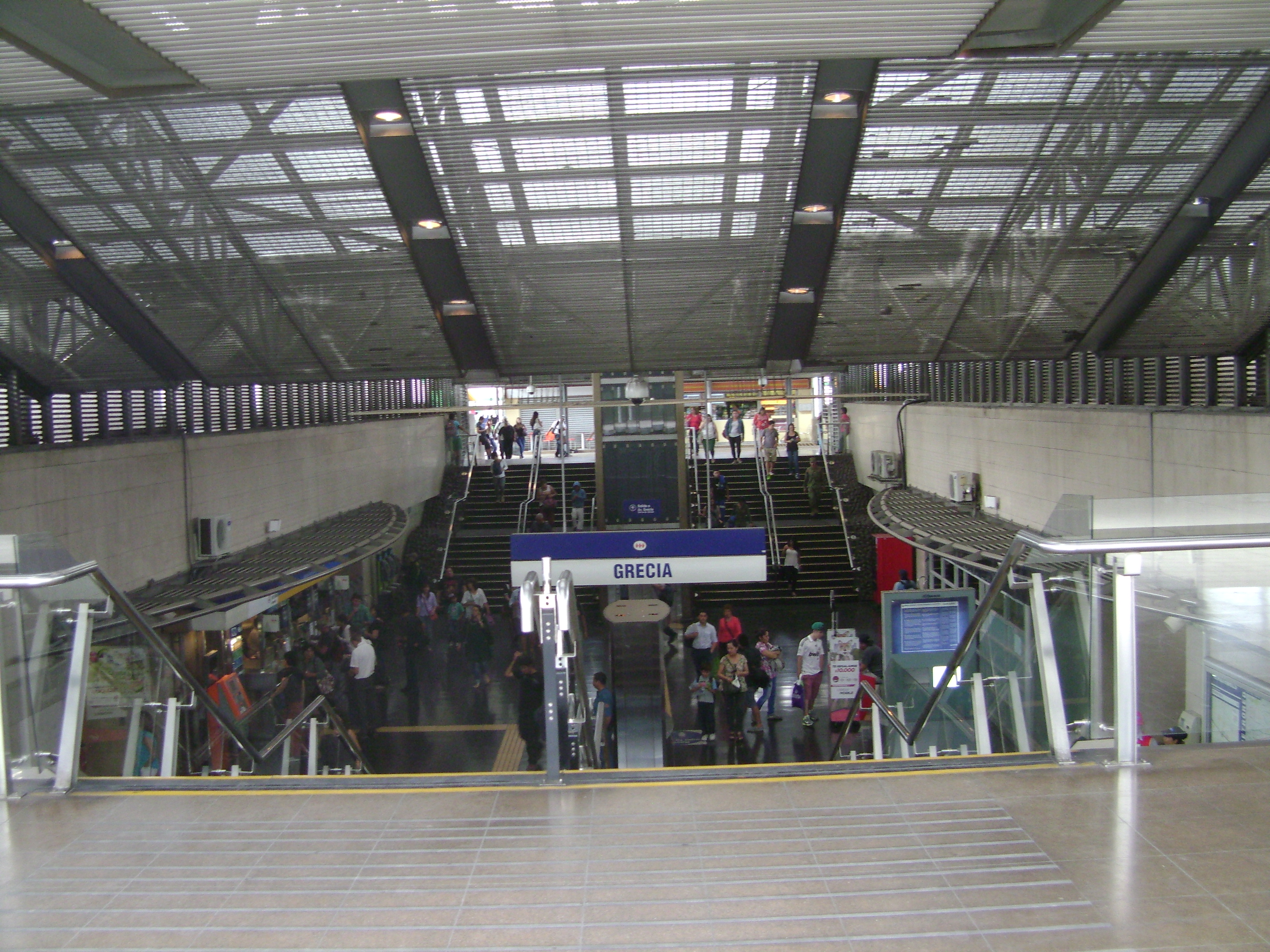

General information
- Location: Américo Vespucio Avenue / Grecia Avenue
- Coordinates: 33°28′8.97″S 70°34′35.33″W
- System: Santiago rapid transit
- Line: Line 4
- Platforms: 2 side platforms
- Tracks: 2
- Connections: Transantiago buses

Construction
- Accessible: yes

History
- Opened: November 30, 2005

Services
Preceding station	Santiago Metro	Following station
Los Orientales towards Tobalaba	Line 4	Los Presidentes towards Plaza de Puente Alto
Location

Grecia is an underground metro station on Line 4 of the Santiago Metro, in Santiago, Chile. The station features a steel-framed skylight. The northernmost portion of the tracks and platforms are laterally curved, which is a distinctive feature of this station.

The station opened on the 30th of November 2005 as southern terminus of the inaugural section of the line between Tobalaba and Grecia. It was briefly the southern terminus of the northern section of the Line 4 until the stations along of the median of Vespucio Sur were put in service on 2 March 2006 and the line has been extended to Vicente Valdés.
