= Plaza de Puente Alto metro station =

Santiago metro station

Coordinates: 33°36′54.41″S 70°34′32.98″W

Plaza de Puente Alto
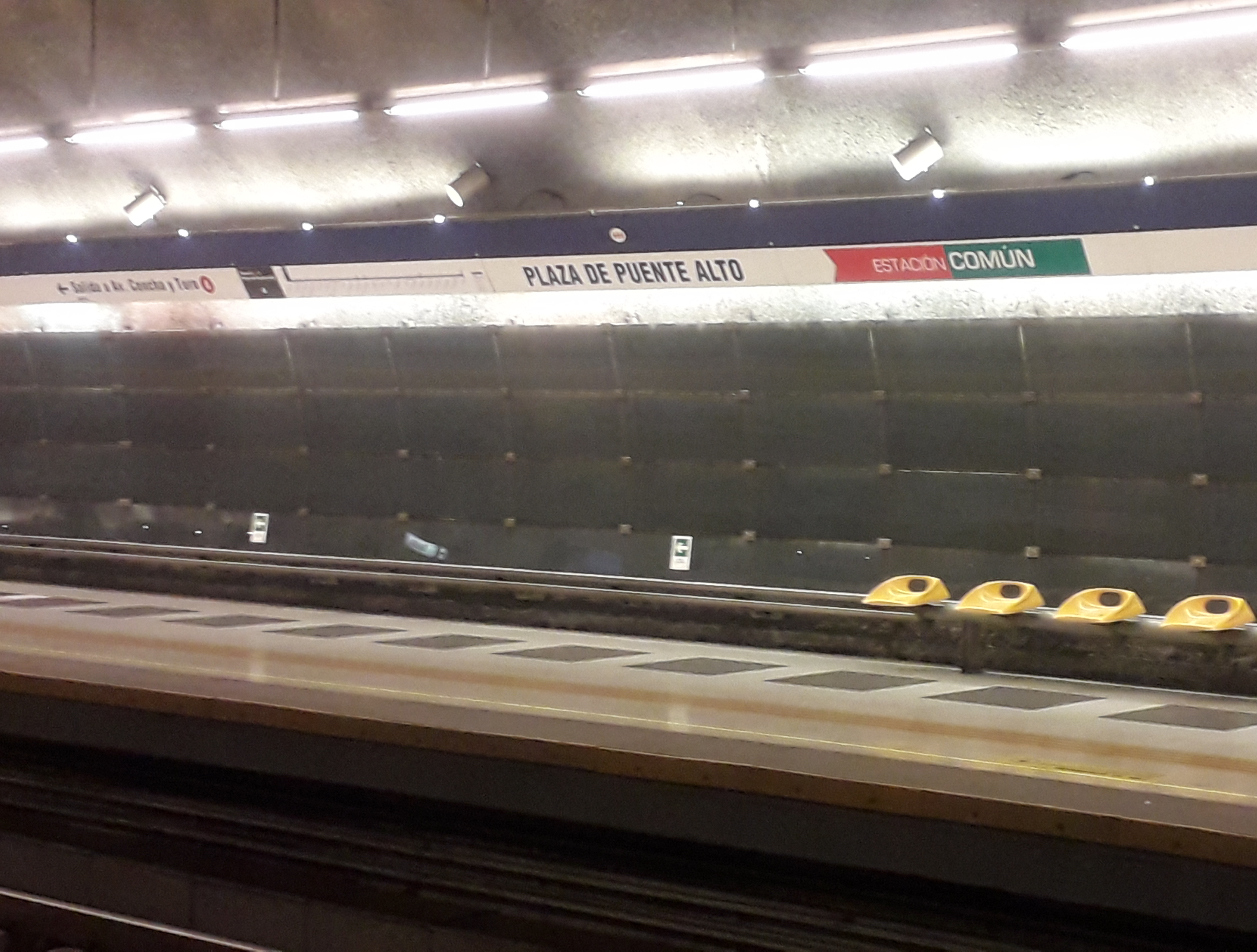

General information
- Location: Puente Alto Main Square (Concha y Toro Avenue / Manuel Rodríguez Street).
- System: Santiago rapid transit
- Line: Line 4
- Platforms: 2 side platforms
- Tracks: 2
- Connections: Transantiago

Construction
- Accessible: yes

History
- Opened: November 30, 2005; 2033

Services
Preceding station	Santiago Metro	Following station
Las Mercedes towards Tobalaba	Line 4	Terminus
Location

Plaza de Puente Alto is an underground metro station and the southern terminal station of Line 4 of the Santiago Metro network, in Santiago, Chile. The station is located under the square of the same name, Plaza de Puente Alto, parallel to Concha y Toro Avenue at the junction with Manuel Rodríguez avenue in the commune of Puente Alto. The station was opened to the public on November 30, 2005 as part of the inaugural section of the line between Vicente Valdés and Plaza de Puente Alto.

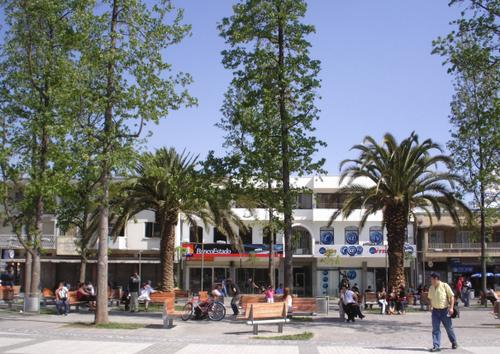
Plaza de Puente Alto (Puente Alto Square)

The station's surroundings are dominated by municipal buildings like the civil registry office of Puente Alto, the Provincia Cordillera (Cordillera Province) building, and the old municipality building. There is a very active community of independent retail stores along with department stores that opened after the arrival of the metro station. In Plaza de Puente Alto square there is a statue of Manuel Rodríguez, a Chilean independentist hero. The station and square are a popular pick-up and connection point for taxis, share taxis, buses that go to different parts of south Santiago and throughout Cordillera Province, of which Puente Alto is the capital. Puente Alto is one of the most densely populated communes in the country, which is one of the reasons for the construction of the metro line and Plaza de Puente Alto metro station. In recent years, Puente Alto has had one of the fastest growing real estate sectors of all the Chilean communes, seeing 20% of total Santiago real estate sales. This rise is mainly due to the construction of houses for middle-class sectors, partly influenced by the extension of the metro network into this part of the city.

It is expected that by 2033 this station will be combined with the future Line 9.

== Etymology ==
The station’s name comes from the Puente Alto center square which it is located beneath.
