= Tobalaba metro station =

Santiago metro station

Tobalaba
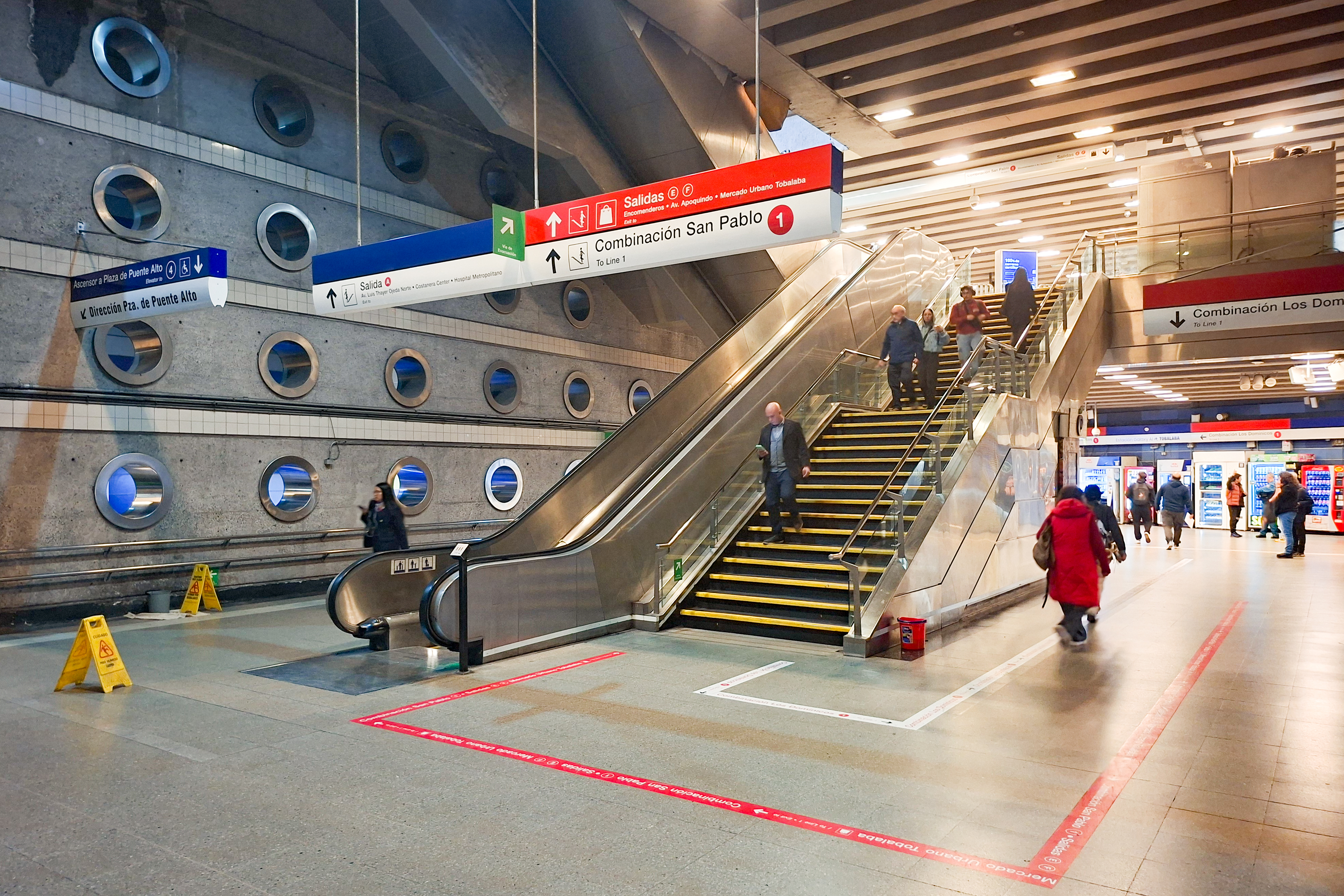

General information
- Location: Providencia Avenue / Tobalaba Avenue
- Coordinates: 33°25′05″S 70°36′06″W
- System: Santiago rapid transit
- Lines: Line 1 Line 4
- Platforms: 2 side platforms at each line
- Tracks: 2 per line
- Connections: Transantiago buses

Construction
- Accessible: Yes

History
- Opened: August 31, 1980; November 30, 2005

Services
Preceding station	Santiago Metro	Following station
Los Leones towards San Pablo	Line 1	El Golf towards Los Dominicos
Terminus	Line 4	Cristóbal Colón towards Plaza de Puente Alto
Location

Tobalaba is a station on the Santiago Metro in Chile, the northern terminus of Line 4 and the closest station to the Costanera Center.

The Line 1 station was opened on 22 August 1980 as part of the extension of the line from Salvador to Escuela Militar. It became an interchange station between Line 1 and Line 4 on 30 November 2005, when the section of Line 4 between Tobalaba and Grecia was opened, and the appearance of the station was altered.
