= Pedro de Valdivia Avenue =

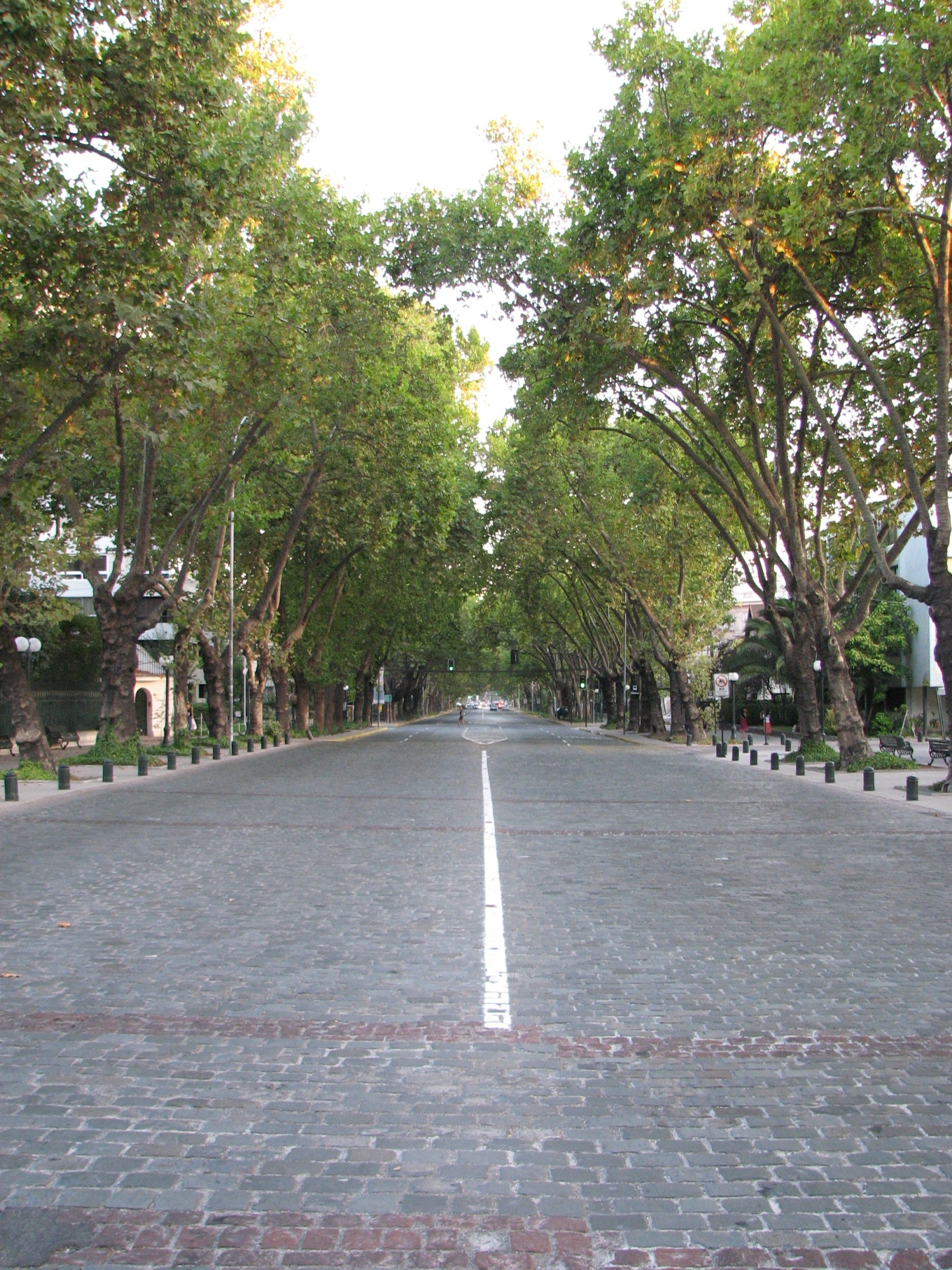
Pedro de Valdivia Avenue, Providencia

Pedro de Valdivia Avenue is a major north-south avenue on the east side of Santiago, Chile. It is named after Pedro de Valdivia and passes through the districts of Providencia, Ñuñoa and Macul.

== Description ==
At its north end, it begins immediately south of the Mapocho River. North of the river, the street continues as Pedro de Valdivia Norte until where it meets the San Cristóbal Hill.

The short stretch between Andrés Bello Avenue and Providencia Avenue is one way southbound, while the rest of the avenue is two-way. The section of the avenue that crosses Providencia is mostly paved with cobblestones and is lined with oriental plane trees.

Just past the intersection with Francisco Bilbao Avenue, Pedro de Valdivia Avenue bisects the square of the same name. Pedro de Valdivia Avenue enters Ñuñoa just south of the median of Diagonal Oriente Street, which continues eastward as Doctor Pedro Lautaro Ferrer Street.

Further south the avenue crosses Irarrázaval Avenue, the main commercial street of the district of Ñuñoa. Continuing southward, the avenue narrows to one lane in each direction shortly after intersecting with Grecia Avenue and forms the eastern boundary of the Estadio Nacional sporting complex.

South of Rodrigo de Araya Street, which marks the boundary between Ñuñoa and Macul, several light industries flank the sides of Pedro de Valdivia Avenue. The final section of the avenue is dominated by single-family worker homes. It terminates at a half roundabout, close to the San Joaquín Campus of the Pontifical Catholic University of Chile.

== Santiago Metro ==
The eastern portion of the Line 6 of the Santiago Metro runs under Pedro de Valdivia Avenue, stopping at Inés de Suárez, Ñuñoa and Estadio Nacional stations.

== History ==
The avenue was created in 1895 to serve as the main spine of an area that was divided into lots for settlement. The area was originally developed as single-family homes for rich people who did want to live in a more rural area. It consisted of mansions surrounded by large gardens. Initially the avenue had a country road character.

1980 marks a milestone year for the northernmost portion of the avenue. The metro extension from Salvador to Escuela Militar and the newly created 11 de Septiembre Avenue were inaugurated in that year, which were built simultaneously. The area begins to have a predominantly commercial character.

Many of Pedro de Valdivia Avenue's original mansions and gardens have been replaced by office or apartment buildings. The few that have been preserved are not used as homes, which include the Palacio Falabella and the Palacio Schacht.
