= Bío Bío metro station =

Santiago metro station

Bío Bío
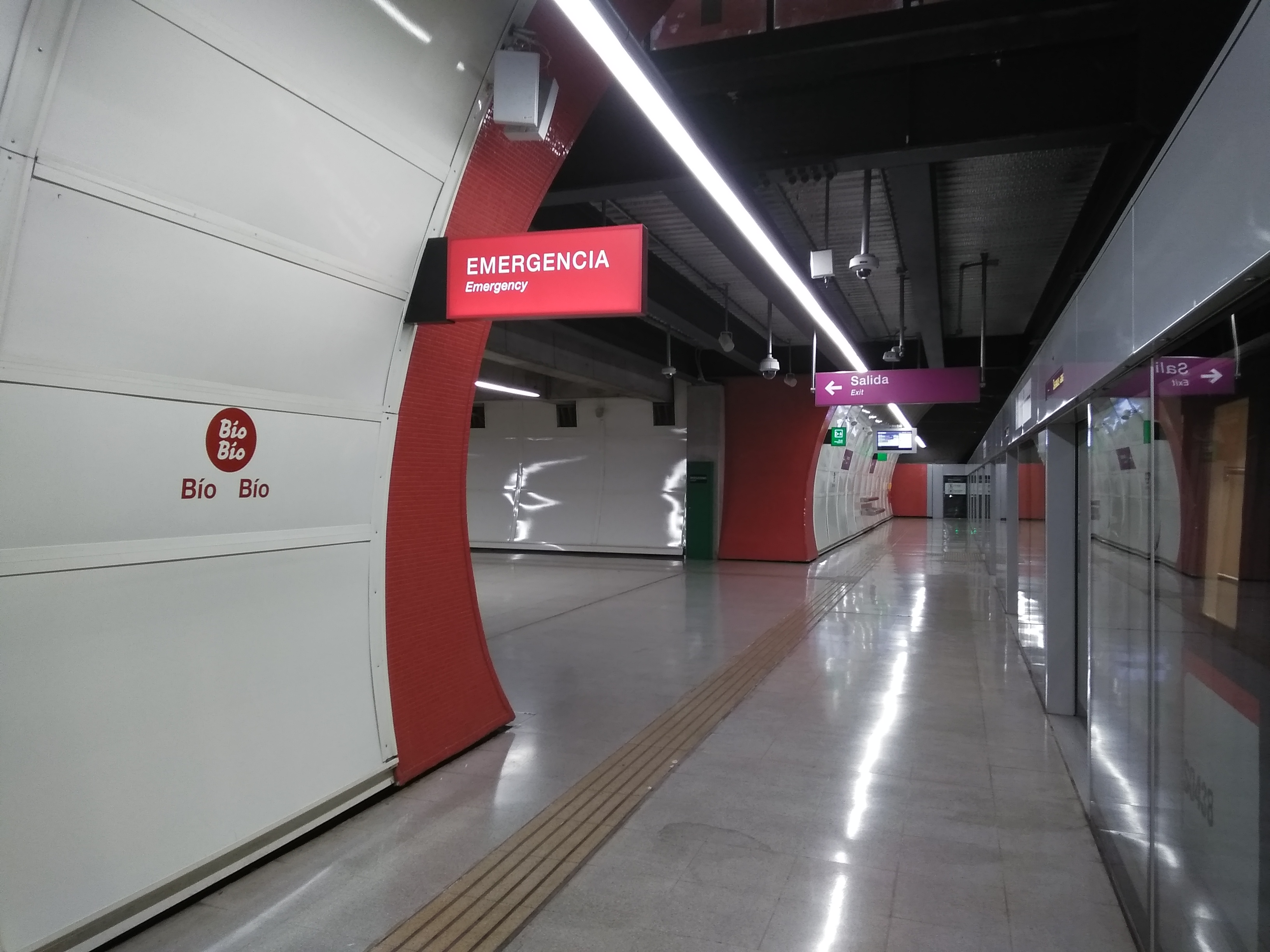
- Platform towards Los Leones

General information
- Location: Santa Rosa Avenue/Pintor Cicarelli
- Coordinates: 33°28′36.2″S 70°38′31.9″W
- System: Santiago rapid transit
- Line: Line 6
- Platforms: 2 side platforms
- Tracks: 2
- Connections: Red buses

Construction
- Accessible: yes

History
- Opened: November 2, 2017; 2030

Services
Preceding station	Santiago Metro	Following station
Franklin towards Cerrillos	Line 6	Ñuble towards Los Leones
Location

Bío Bío is an underground metro station on the Line 6 of the Santiago Metro, in Santiago, Chile. This station is named for the station is located steps from the La Aguada Flood Park and the mentioned commercial district, one of the oldest in the city. The station was opened on 2 November 2017 as part of the inaugural section of the line, between Cerrillos and Los Leones.

It is expected that by 2030 this station will be combined with the future Line 9.
