= Presidente Pedro Aguirre Cerda metro station =

Santiago metro station

Pdte. Pedro Aguirre Cerda
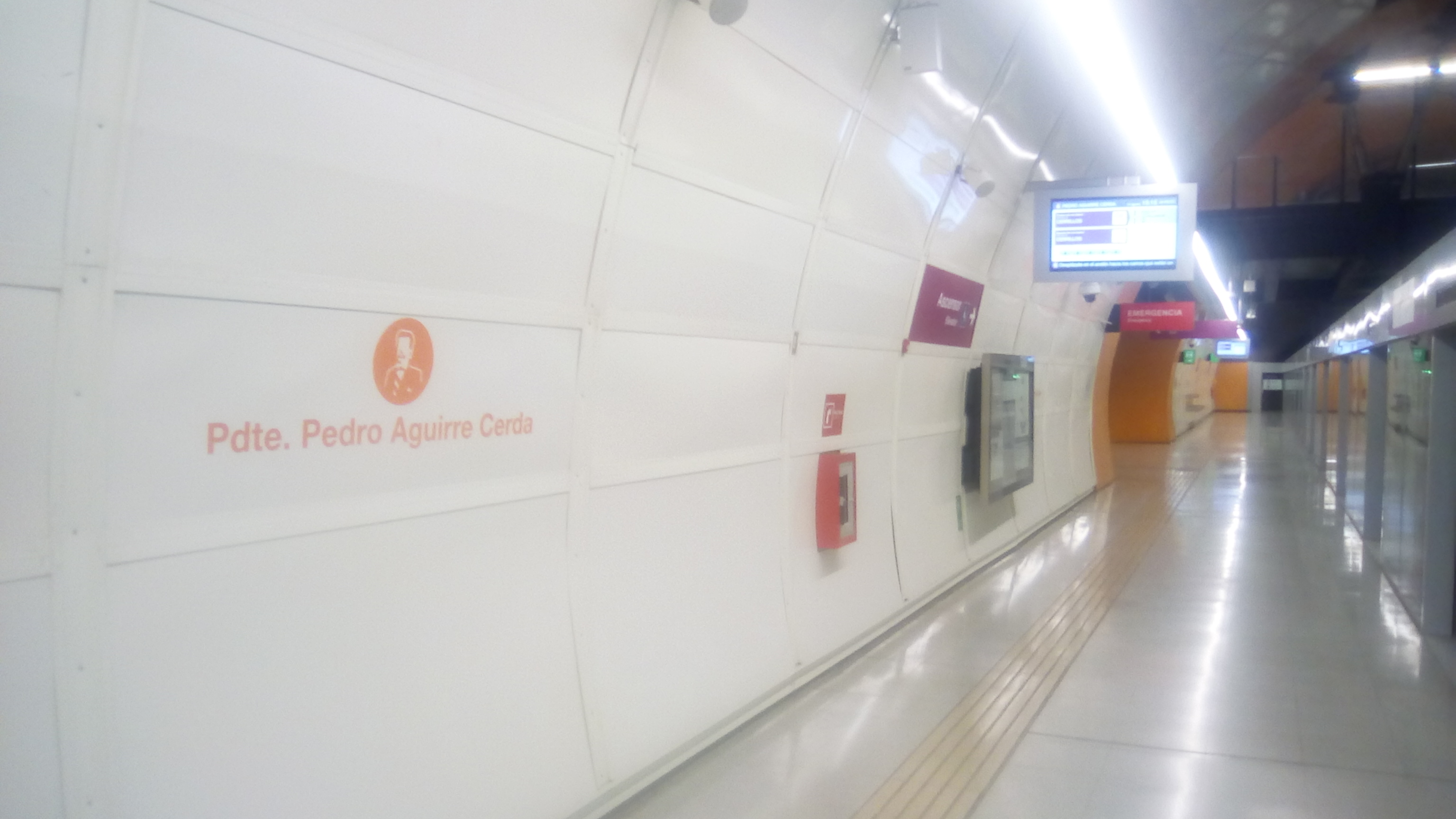

General information
- Location: Carlos Valdovinos Avenue/Club Hípico
- Coordinates: 33°28′42.2″S 70°39′54.2″W
- System: Santiago rapid transit
- Line: Line 6
- Platforms: 2 side platforms
- Tracks: 2
- Connections: Transantiago buses

Construction
- Accessible: Yes

History
- Opened: November 2, 2017

Services
Preceding station	Santiago Metro	Following station
Lo Valledor towards Cerrillos	Line 6	Franklin towards Los Leones
Location

Presidente Pedro Aguirre Cerda is an underground metro station on the Line 6 of the Santiago Metro, in Santiago, Chile. This station is named for the name of the commune and the president of Chile of the same name who governed between 1938 and 1941. The station was opened on 2 November 2017 as part of the inaugural section of the line, between Cerrillos and Los Leones.

It was originally called, while it was being built, Club Hipico, named after the Club Hipico avenue, which runs beside the station.
