= Santiago Metro Line 6 =

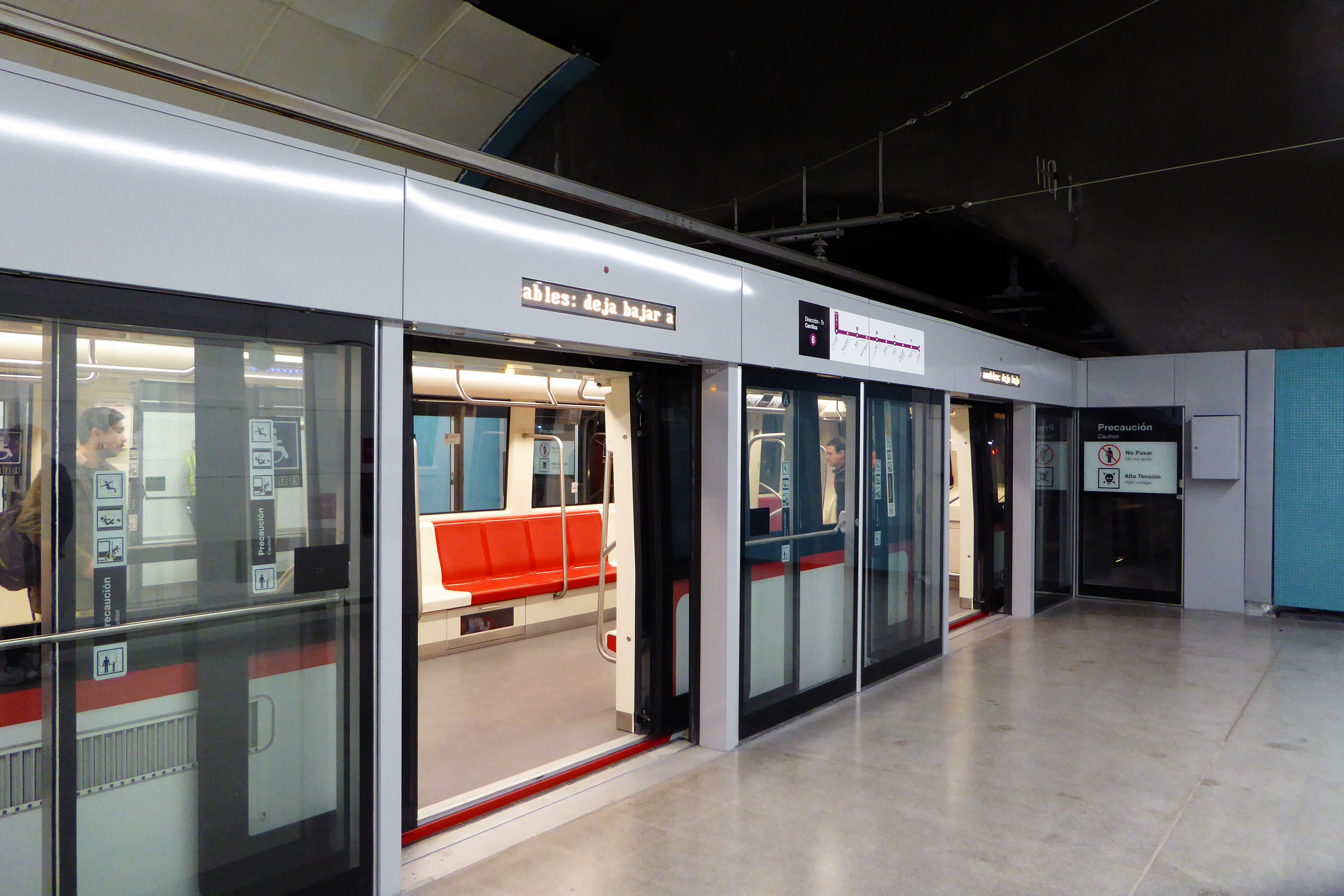

Overview
- Status: Completed, inaugurated November 2, 2017; 8 years ago
- Owner: Empresa de Transporte de Pasajeros Metro S.A.
- Locale: Santiago
- Termini: Cerrillos station; Los Leones station
- Stations: 10

Service
- Type: Rapid transit
- System: Santiago Metro, Transantiago
- Services: 1
- Operator: Empresa de Transporte de Pasajeros Metro S.A.
- Rolling stock: CAF AS 2014

History
- Opened: November 2, 2017; 8 years ago

Technical
- Line length: 15.3 km (9.5 mi)
- Num of tracks: 2
- Character: Underground
- Track gauge: 1,435 mm (4 ft 8 1/2 in) standard gauge
- Electrification: 1,500 V DC overhead catenary
Line 6 Map

Santiago Metro Line 6 is a line on the Santiago Metro, Santiago, Chile. It connects the commune of Cerrillos, in the south west of the city, with Providencia in the east of the city, where most economic activity is concentrated. It has 10 new stations on 15.3 km (9.5 mi) of track. Its distinctive color on the network line map is purple.

The main purposes of Line 6 is to relieve the saturated Line 1, to provide extra connections across the Santiago transport network, and to incentivise development in the south central area of the capital city.

The line connects with Line 1, Line 2, Line 3 and Line 5, with the suburban train network (Metrotrén) at Lo Valledor station. Two expansions of Line 6 are being built in each end of the line. At the north-eastern end, the expansion to Isidora Goyenechea station plans to connect it with future Line 7, and at the south-western end future terminal station Lo Errazuriz is planned to connect with the future Metrotrén Melipilla. There are also plans to connect Line 6 with future Line 8 at Los Leones and future Line 9 at Bio-Bio station.

The line directly benefits the communes of Cerrillos, Estación Central, Pedro Aguirre Cerda, Santiago, San Miguel, San Joaquín, Ñuñoa, Providencia and Las Condes.

It was inaugurated on November 2, 2017, by President Michelle Bachelet and reportedly cost a total of US$1.26 billion to construct.

On April 4th, 2024 the construction of the 3 km extension to Lo Errázuriz station begun, in a ceremony headed by president Gabriel Boric and mayor of Cerrillos Lorena Facuse. It is estimated to open in 2027.

On June 1st, 2025 President Gabriel Boric announced a major 6.4 km extension on the western end of Line 6, that would connect it with Line 4A (which would be then renamed to Line 10] and Line 5 at Plaza de Maipú to then end at the western section of Maipú at El Carmén Hospital.. However in an August 2026 interview the president of Metro S.A. said that the extension had no immediate financing or inauguration date.

== History ==
The project was announced by Chilean president Michelle Bachelet in 2009. In January 2012 a modification to the original track plan was announced, with the “Maestranza” (renamed as “Lo Valledor”) and “Club Hípico” stations relocated on Avenida Carlos Valdovinos.

However, on December 22, 2017, as a result of the announcement of the construction of the new Line 7, the lengthening of Line 6 from Los Leones station to the future Isidora Goyenechea station was confirmed, which will keep both lines connected.

=== Initial criticisms ===
Mayors of some of the wealthier communes in the east of the city have criticised the project, claiming that insufficient consultation had taken place before it was announced. Other critics complained about further delays in the construction of Line 3, whose completion date was pushed back in favour of Line 6.

Technical studies carried out by the Catholic University of Chile claimed that Line 6 has several advantages over Line 3, primarily because of its greater social impact and the potential for development it brings to derelict areas of the city.

=== Innovations ===
This new metro line (along with Line 3) has higher security and passenger comfort standards than other lines. The new security measures include cameras inside the trains, an overhead electric transmission line, driverless trains, platform screen doors and air conditioning in the trains.

Line 6 suffered the least amount of damage from the October 2019 protests, but was nevertheless closed on the weekend of October 18, 2019 due to security issues. Service on Line 6 was partially restored on October 23, and all stations were reopened by the end of the year.

== Stations ==
Although the trains of the line 6 are composed of 5 cars, the stations are designed for 6-car trainsets.

Line 6 stations, from west to east, are:

Stations	Transfers	Location	Opened	Commune	Note
Lo Errázuriz	Tren Estación Central-Melipilla	Salvador Allende/Av. Lo Errázuriz Avenue	2027	Cerrillos	
Cerrillos		Pedro Aguirre Cerda/Departamental Avenues	November 2, 2017	Cerrillos	
Lo Valledor	Tren Nos-Estación Central	Carlos Valdovinos Avenue/Maipú Street	November 2, 2017	Pedro Aguirre Cerda	
Presidente Pedro Aguirre Cerda		Carlos Valdovinos/Club Hípico Avenue	November 2, 2017	Pedro Aguirre Cerda	
Franklin	Santiago Metro Line 2	Placer/Nataniel Cox Streets	November 2, 2017	Santiago	
Bío Bío		Placer Street/Santa Rosa Avenue	November 2, 2017	Santiago	This station will be future combination with the line in 2030
Ñuble	Santiago Metro Line 5	Carlos Dittborn/Vicuña Mackenna Avenues	November 2, 2017	Ñuñoa	
Estadio Nacional		Pedro de Valdivia/Grecia Avenues	November 2, 2017	Ñuñoa	
Ñuñoa	Santiago Metro Line 3	Pedro de Valdivia/Irarrázaval Avenues	November 2, 2017	Ñuñoa	
Inés de Suárez		Pedro de Valdivia/Francisco Bilbao Avenues	November 2, 2017	Providencia	
Los Leones	Santiago Metro Line 1	Providencia/Suecia Avenues	November 2, 2017	Providencia	This station will be future combination with the line in 2033
Isidora Goyenechea	Santiago Metro Line 7	Vitacura Avenue/Isidora Goyenechea Avenues	2028	Las Condes	This station will be future combination with the line in 2028

== Line 6 Data Sheet ==
- Terminus communes:
  - Cerrillos
  - Pedro Aguirre Cerda
  - Santiago
  - San Miguel
  - Ñuñoa
  - Providencia
- Track:
  - Departamental Avenue: 1 station
  - Carlos Valdovinos Avenue: 2 stations
  - Centenario Street: 2 stations
  - Carlos Dittborn Avenue: 1 station
  - Pedro de Valdivia Avenue: 3 stations
  - Providencia Avenue: 1 station
- Construction Method:
  - Underground
- Opening Dates:
  - November 2, 2017

== See also ==
- Empresa de los Ferrocarriles del Estado
- List of metro systems
- Red Metropolitana de Movilidad
