= Ñuble metro station =

Santiago metro station

Ñuble
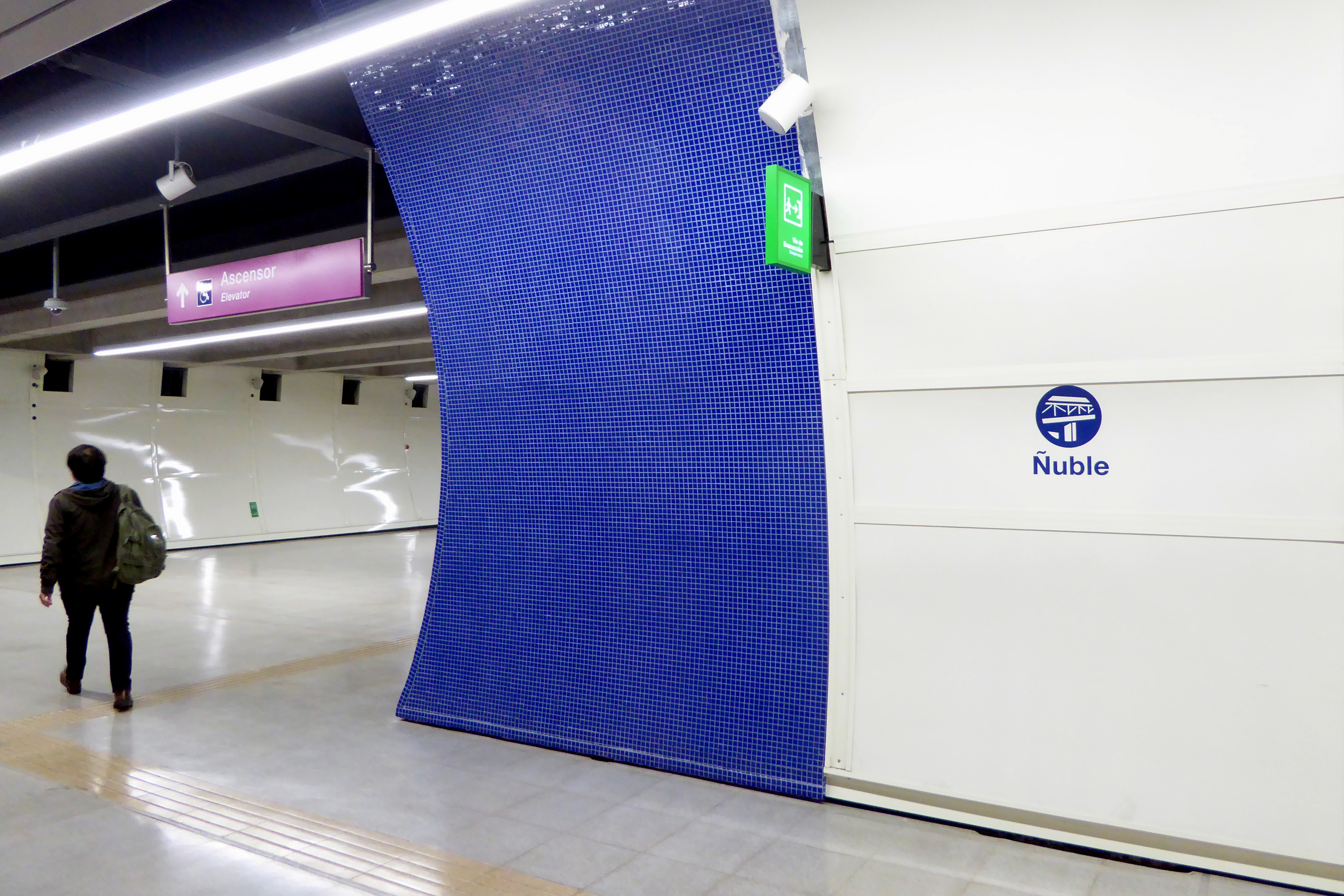
- Andén to Los Leones by Line 6.

General information
- Location: Carlos Dittborn Avenue, between Vicuña Mackenna avenue and San Eugenio avenue
- Coordinates: 33°28′2.52″S 70°37′29.2″W
- System: Santiago rapid transit
- Lines: Line 5 Line 6
- Platforms: 2 side platforms
- Tracks: 2
- Connections: Transantiago buses

Construction
- Accessible: yes

History
- Opened: April 5, 1997; November 2, 2017

Services
Preceding station	Santiago Metro	Following station
Irarrázaval towards Plaza de Maipú	Line 5	Rodrigo de Araya towards Vicente Valdés
Bío Bío towards Cerrillos	Line 6	Estadio Nacional towards Los Leones
Location

Ñuble is a transfer station between the Line 5 and Line 6 of the Santiago Metro. The station has street-level platforms with an underground ticket hall, which is accessed from the south sidewalk of the underpass under the station, which carries Carlos Dittborn Avenue. That street originates half-block west of the station as the continuation of Ñuble Street, which gives its name to the station. The Line 5 station was opened on 5 April 1997 as part of the inaugural section of the line, from Baquedano to Bellavista de La Florida. The Line 6 station was opened on 2 November 2017 as part of the inaugural section of the line, between Cerrillos and Los Leones.

Its copper-clad roof is supported by girder arches, which have circular holes.

Old symbol with which the station was identified.
