= Estadio Nacional metro station =

Santiago metro station

Estadio Nacional
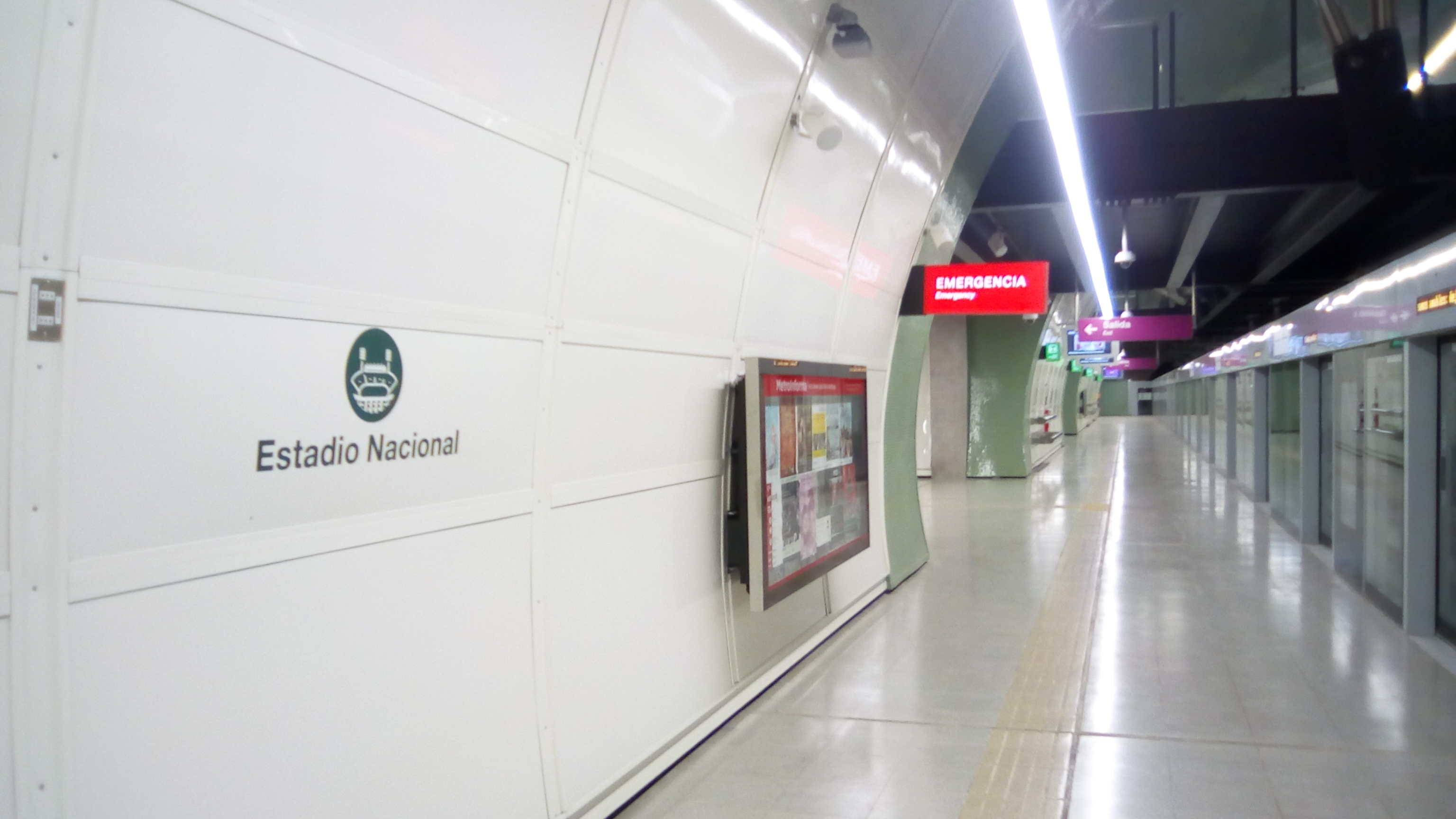

General information
- Location: Pedro de Valdivia Avenue/ Grecia Avenue
- Coordinates: 33°27′46.2″S 70°36′24.2″W
- System: Santiago rapid transit
- Line: Line 6
- Platforms: 2 side platforms
- Tracks: 2
- Connections: Transantiago buses

Construction
- Accessible: yes

History
- Opened: 2 November 2017

Services
Preceding station	Santiago Metro	Following station
Ñuble towards Cerrillos	Line 6	Ñuñoa towards Los Leones
Location

Estadio Nacional is an underground metro station on the Line 6 of the Santiago Metro, in Santiago, Chile. This station is so named due to being in the northeastern corner of the Estadio Nacional Julio Martínez Prádanos, main sports center of the country. The station has a special design, different from the rest of the stations, because its large dimensions allow managing large flows of people during sporting or recreational events in the stadium. The station was opened on 2 November 2017 as part of the inaugural section of the line, which starts at Cerrillos and ends at Los Leones. The Line 6 has since been expanded, and Estadio Nacional is now between Ñuble metro station and Ñuñoa metro station. It was closed between October 18 and November 18 of 2019 due to damage from the 2019-2022 Chilean protests.
