= Embassy of Sweden, Santiago =

- Location: Santiago
- Address: Embajada de Suecia; Apoquindo Avenue 2929; Las Condes, Santiago de Chile
- Coordinates: 33.41777°S 70.59909°W
- Inaugurated: 1934
- Ambassador: Sofia Karlberg
- Jurisdiction: Chile
- Website: Official website

The Embassy of Sweden in Santiago is Sweden's diplomatic mission in Chile, currently located in Las Condes. Sweden first established diplomatic ties with Chile in the 19th century, opening a consulate in 1846. By 1939, the Swedish legation in Santiago became independent, and in 1956 it was elevated to a full embassy.

During the 1973 Chilean coup, Ambassador Harald Edelstam and embassy staff played a key humanitarian role, rescuing political refugees and protecting cultural artifacts. Edelstam was expelled later that year, and Sweden maintained only a minimal presence until democracy returned in 1991. Since then, the embassy has resumed full diplomatic activities, including temporary responsibility for Peru when the Swedish embassy in Lima was closed.

As of 2025, the embassy employs three Swedish diplomats, nine local staff, and one intern. Its mission includes promoting trade, culture, migration and consular matters, and reporting on politics, human rights, and the economy. The chancery has moved multiple times and, since 2023, is located at Apoquindo Avenue 2929. The ambassadorial residence, completed in 2006, is at 9640 Via Celeste Street in Vitacura and features a two-story modern design with glass walls, terraces, and expansive lawns.

== History ==
=== Swedish–Chilean relations before 1973 ===
Sweden first announced its intention to maintain diplomatic and consular relations with Chile in 1827. Nearly two decades later, in 1846, a Swedish honorary consulate was established, which initially covered both the Republic of Bolivia and the Republic of Chile. By 1858, it had been upgraded to a consulate general, and in 1903 its consular district was restricted solely to Chile.

By the early 20th century, Sweden's presence in Chile remained minimal. In a 1918 report to the King in Council regarding the upcoming national budget, the Swedish foreign minister noted that Chile was represented only by an honorary consul in Valparaíso, who was also the head of a large British company. To strengthen Sweden's representation, it was proposed that the Swedish envoy in Buenos Aires also be accredited to Chile. The recently completed railway across the Andes made travel between Buenos Aires and Santiago manageable, allowing the head of mission to visit Chile regularly. Meanwhile, a commercial attaché could manage ongoing duties, and a consular officer could be added if necessary.

Following this plan, Carl Hultgren became Sweden's first minister accredited to Chile, serving as envoy extraordinary and minister plenipotentiary to both Argentina and Chile, with residence in Buenos Aires from 1 April 1918.

In 1929, the Swedish Parliament decided to establish a salaried vice-consulate in Valparaíso, which was later moved to Santiago in 1933. When Vice-Consul Torsten Vinell went on extended leave in early 1934, Axel Paulin, who was stationed in Buenos Aires but also recognized by the Chilean government as part of the Santiago mission, stepped in as his substitute and was notified as chargé d'affaires ad interim. This arrangement was practical, cost-effective, and allowed Sweden to maintain continuous diplomatic functions in Chile. When the vice-consul position became vacant, Paulin temporarily assumed that role as well.

By 1939, the Swedish legation in Santiago had become fully independent, with the minister in Buenos Aires no longer accredited to Chile. Legation Counsellor Paulin, who had previously served as chargé d'affaires ad interim, was promoted to minister plenipotentiary and continued his work as chargé d'affaires from the following year.

The relationship between Sweden and Chile reached a new level in November 1956, when both countries agreed to elevate their legations to full embassies. From that point on, Swedish representatives in Chile held the diplomatic rank of ambassador extraordinary and plenipotentiary, replacing the previous title of envoy extraordinary and minister plenipotentiary.

After the La Ligua earthquake on 28 March 1965, it was reported that the Swedish embassy building suffered some damage.

=== Sweden and the 1973 Chilean Coup ===
After the Chilean coup d'état on 11 September 1973, the Swedish embassy in Santiago and its then-ambassador, Harald Edelstam, along with his staff, played a critical role in rescuing opposition members, fellow Swedes, and other foreigners threatened with murder or imprisonment by the military junta. Edelstam quickly became a key figure in protecting political refugees and upholding humanitarian principles. The coup created immediate danger for those seeking asylum, particularly at the nearby Cuban embassy, where Edelstam repeatedly intervened to mediate between the military and the occupants. He personally entered the embassy multiple times, ensured the safety of staff and asylum seekers, and raised the Swedish flag to deter a military assault. He also took responsibility for safeguarding Cuban properties, including disposing of abandoned weapons, and transformed Swedish diplomatic premises into safe havens for hundreds of persecuted individuals from Chile and other Latin American countries.

Despite lacking formal authorization from the Swedish government, Edelstam opened the Swedish embassy to those in need, often personally transporting refugees from the streets and negotiating releases from detention centers such as the Estadio Nacional. He played a vital role in saving people at risk of execution, most notably rescuing 54 Uruguayans who were scheduled for imminent execution. Beyond his humanitarian work, Edelstam helped preserve Chilean cultural heritage, smuggling out original reels of The Battle of Chile and recordings by Víctor Jara, ensuring these cultural treasures survived the regime's repression.

Edelstam's actions angered the Chilean military, leading to armed incidents near the former Cuban embassy and a confrontation in November 1973, when he tried to prevent the arrest of Mirtha Fernández Pucurrull, a seriously ill Uruguayan woman. The encounter escalated into a physical altercation and threats to his life. By mid-November, the Chilean government formally demanded his removal, and on 3 December 1973, he was declared persona non grata. Edelstam left Chile on 9 December, after ensuring the safe departure of twenty political refugees to Sweden.

In early December 1973, the Swedish embassy sheltered around eighty refugees from the Chilean junta, including President Salvador Allende's private secretary, Miria Contreras. The embassy staff at the time numbered six, including Edelstam, but was soon reduced to four after Edelstam's expulsion and the departure of desk officer Ulf Hjertonsson, who escorted Pucurrull to Sweden.

Following Edelstam's removal, Sweden, in protest, did not appoint a new ambassador and maintained only a minimal diplomatic presence until democracy returned in 1991. Carl-Johan Groth, who succeeded Edelstam as chargé d'affaires, continued humanitarian efforts in a more cautious manner, negotiating safe passages and releases without provoking the military, and ultimately concluded Sweden's direct diplomatic protection for asylum seekers by mid-1974.

=== Post-1973 developments and contemporary relations ===
On 21 November 1988, the Swedish embassy and the European Commission's representation office in Santiago were occupied by demonstrators. Two protesters entered the Swedish embassy and three the Commission office, demanding that European countries pressure General Augusto Pinochet to investigate a series of deaths that had occurred since the 5 October plebiscite. By around 11 p.m. on 22 November, the occupiers abandoned their demand that Sweden push the Chilean government to conduct an impartial inquiry into these mysterious deaths. After consulting with their "solidarity group" outside, they left the embassy following 37 hours of occupation. A similar action had taken place a few months earlier in August, during which the occupiers voluntarily left the building after just over a day.

In 1990, Sweden once again posted an ambassador to Chile for the first time since the 1973 military coup. On 20 April, Sweden's chargé d'affaires at the time, Staffan Wrigstad, presented his credentials to Chile's new president, Patricio Aylwin. According to Foreign Minister Sten Andersson, Sweden sought to accredit a new ambassador in Santiago as quickly as possible following the change of power, as a demonstration of its strong support for Chile's democratic government.

In the summer of 2001, a group of Mapuche activists refused to leave the Swedish embassy, seeking political asylum in Sweden. The following year, on 22 July 2002, the Swedish embassy was occupied once more by a group of Chileans. The sixteen occupiers had armed themselves with Molotov cocktails, and some had doused themselves in petrol. They claimed to represent 600 people who had suddenly lost their homes. Their demand for leaving the building was to meet with representatives of the Chilean authorities and the Chilean press. No embassy staff were harmed, and the occupation ended the same day.

After Sweden closed its embassy in Lima in 2001, the embassy in Santiago assumed responsibility for Peru as well, and Sweden's ambassador in Santiago was accredited to Lima. This arrangement continued until 2016, when the Lima embassy reopened. When the Lima embassy closed again in 2022, the Santiago embassy once more took responsibility for Peru. Since 2025, a Stockholm-based ambassador has been responsible for Peru, returning the Santiago embassy's responsibilities solely to Chile.

== Staff and tasks ==
=== Staff ===
As of 2025, the staff consists of three people from the Ministry for Foreign Affairs, nine local employees and one intern.

=== Tasks ===
The embassy's mission is to represent Sweden and the Swedish government in Chile. The embassy's activities include trade promotion, cultural and Swedish promotion, migration and consular matters, as well as reporting on politics, human rights and the economy.

== Buildings ==
=== Chancery ===
The chancery has had several homes in Santiago over the years. From 1940 to 1941, it was located at Pedro de Valdivia Avenue 1664 in Providencia, before moving in 1942 to Calle Eusebio Lillo 2046. By at least 1945, it had settled at Calle Barros Errázuriz 1975, where it remained until 1955.

In 1956, the chancery moved to Pedro de Valdivia Avenue 1218–1224, later occupying only number 1224 until 1968. From 1966 to at least 1988, it was based at Calle Darío Urzúa 2165, a building that would eventually be demolished in 2014–2015. (Note: This building was demolished in 2014/15 and today a new residential property stands on the site.)

Until 2023, the chancery was housed on the fourth floor of an office complex at Nueva Providencia Avenue 2353 (formerly 11 de Septiembre Avenue) in Providencia. Designed by the architectural firm Flaño Nuñez Tuca Arquitectos, the building was constructed between 1986 and 1988. In 2023, the chancery moved to its current location at Apoquindo Avenue 2929 in the Las Condes district.

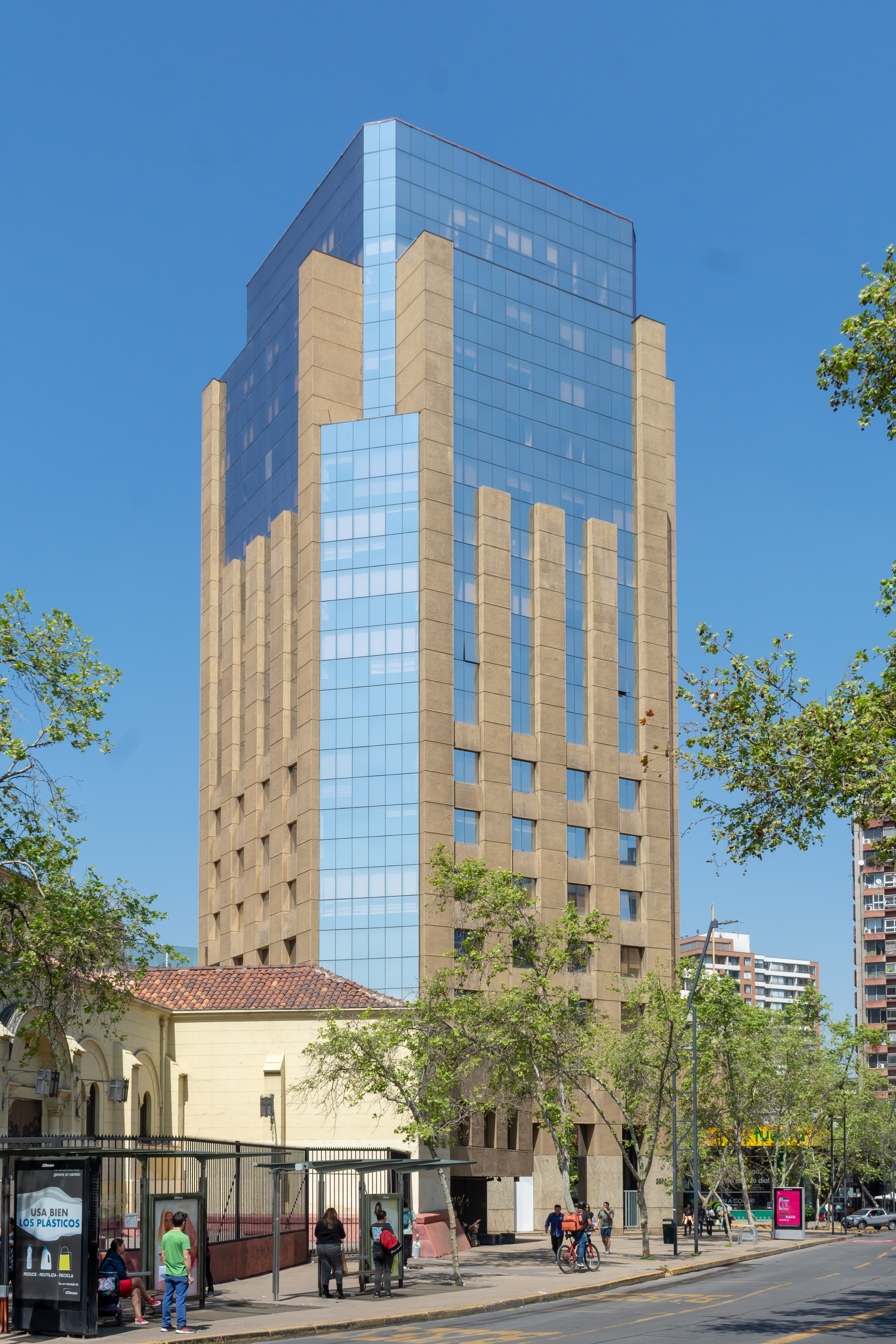
Nueva Providencia 2353
(–2023)

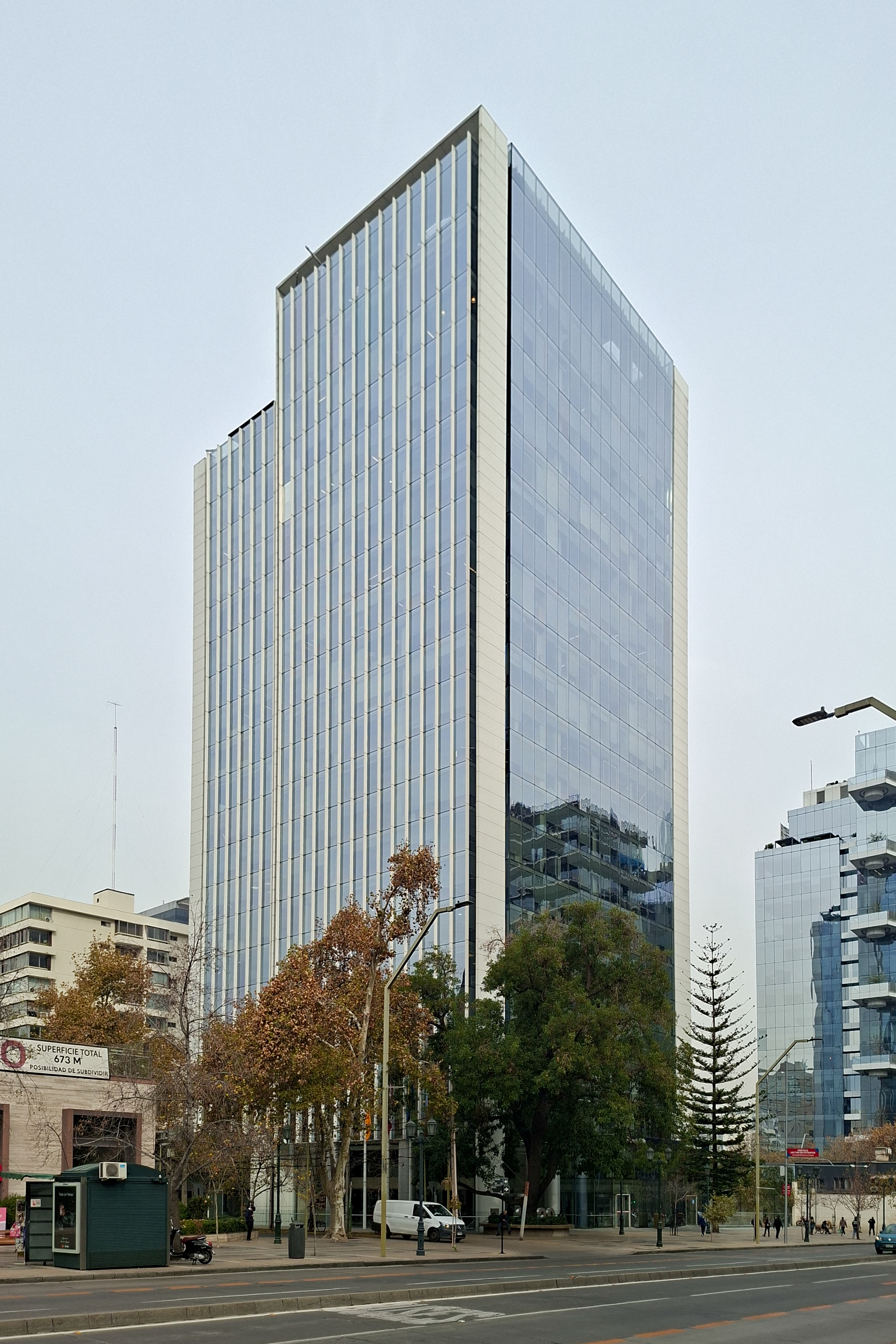
Apoquindo Avenue 2929
(2023–present)

=== Residence ===
From at least 1945 until 1955, the ambassadorial residence was located at Avenida Lyon 635 in the commune of Providencia. From 1956, it was moved to Pedro de Valdivia Avenue 1224, where it remained until at least 1968.

Since 2006, the ambassadorial residence has been situated at Calle Via Celeste 9640 in the Lo Curro neighborhood of Vitacura. In the autumn of 2002, the National Property Board of Sweden announced a two-stage competition for the design of a new residence in Santiago. The winning proposal, Trandans (lit. 'Crane Dance'), was designed by architect Josefina Nordmark (SAR/MSA (Note: SAR/MSA is one of the protected professional and membership titles that shows that the architect is trained in architecture and is a member of the industry organization Sveriges Arkitekter ("Architects Sweden").)). The building was completed in the summer of 2006 and includes both representative spaces and a private section for the ambassador's residence.

The residence is a two-story building featuring a large canopy, glulam beams, glass walls, and terraces. It is built on a sloping site with expansive lawns, designed without trees or hedges to obstruct the view.
