= Ñuñoa metro station =

Santiago metro station

Ñuñoa
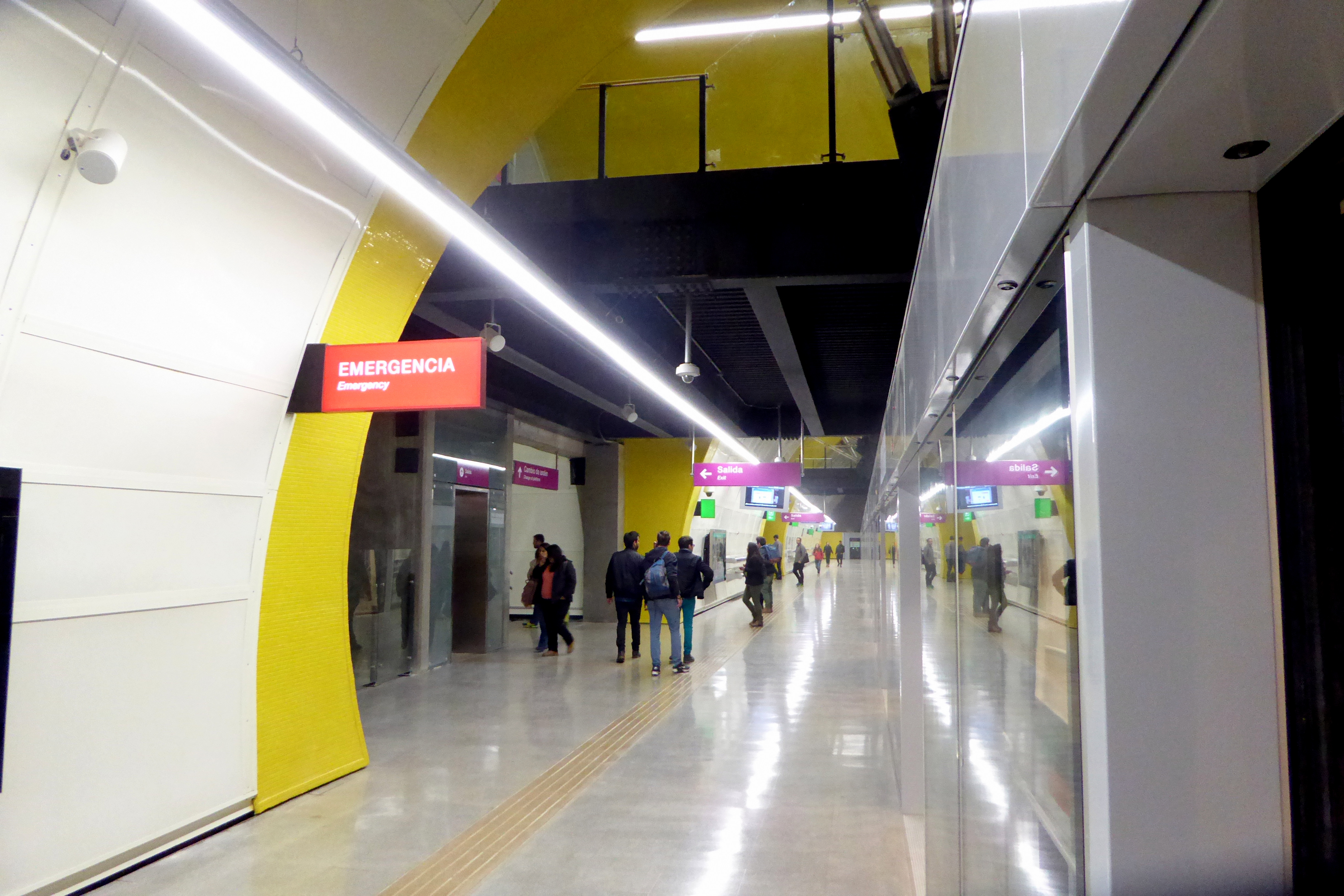

General information
- Location: Pedro de Valdivia Avenue / Irarrázaval Avenue
- Coordinates: 33°27′15.6″S 70°36′18.6″W
- System: Santiago rapid transit
- Lines: Line 3 Line 6
- Platforms: 2 side platforms
- Tracks: 2
- Connections: Transantiago buses

Construction
- Accessible: yes

History
- Opened: 2 November 2017; 22 January 2019

Services
Preceding station	Santiago Metro	Following station
Monseñor Eyzaguirre towards Plaza Quilicura	Line 3	Chile España towards Fernando Castillo Velasco
Estadio Nacional towards Cerrillos	Line 6	Inés de Suárez towards Los Leones
Location

Ñuñoa is a transfer station between the Line 3 and Line 6 of the Santiago Metro. The Line 6 station was opened on 2 November 2017 as part of the inaugural section of the line, between Cerrillos and Los Leones. The Line 3 station was opened on 22 January 2019 as part of the inaugural section of the line, from Los Libertadores to Fernando Castillo Velasco.

It differs from the other stations of the line 6 because some walls are colored yellow or blue, compared to the other stations of the line 6.

In its environment you can find shops, banks, restaurants and supermarkets, thus forming the center of the commune, which gives it its name.
