= Ñuble =

Ñuble may refer to:

- Ñuble Region, in Chile
- Ñuble River, in Ñuble Region in Chile
- Ñuble metro station, in Santiago

== See also ==
- Ñuble Province (disambiguation)
- Ñublense, a Chilean football team
