= Lo Valledor metro station =

Santiago metro station

Lo Valledor
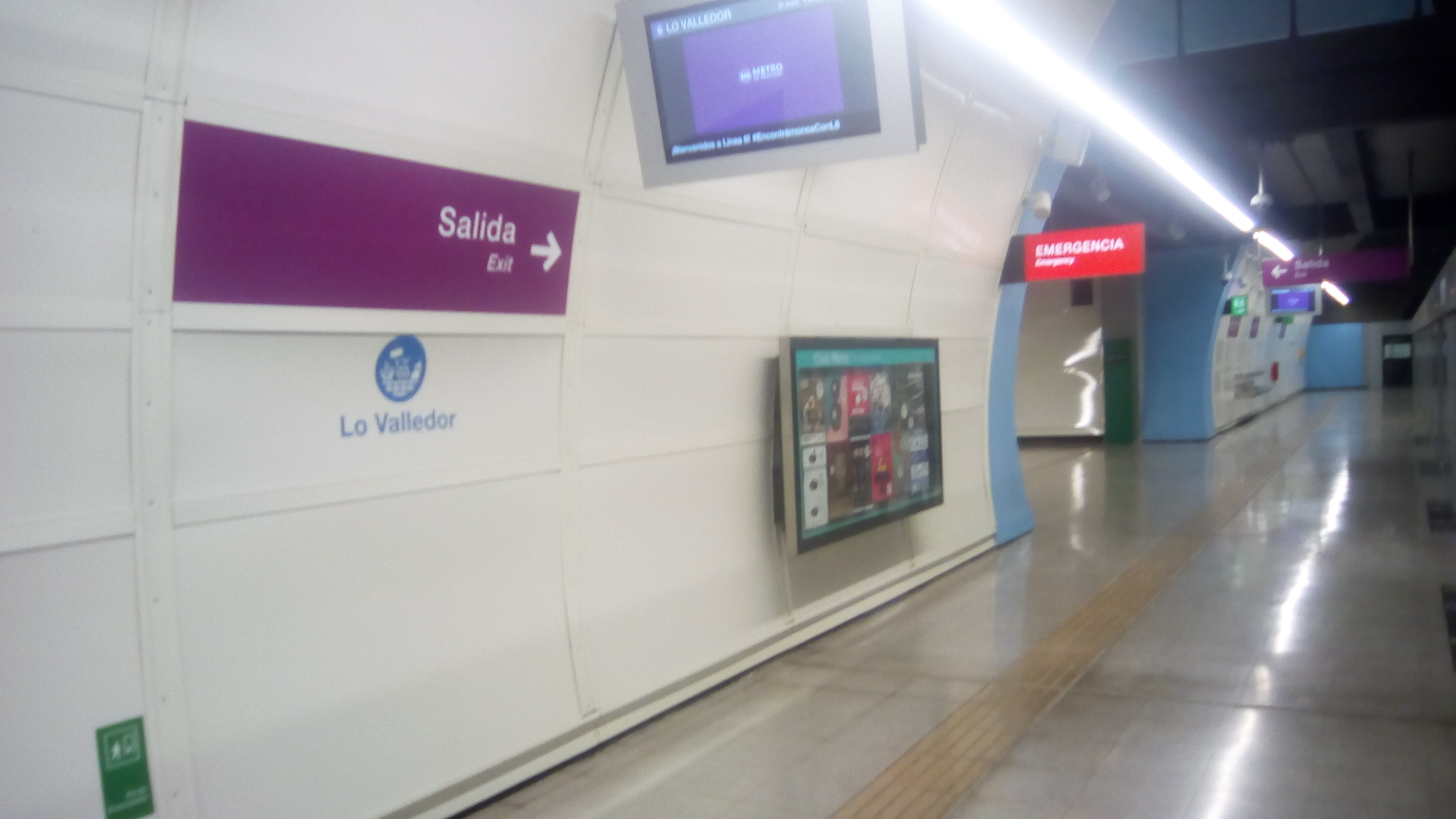

General information
- Location: Carlos Valdovinos Avenue / Maipú Avenue
- Coordinates: 33.4784°S 70.6809°W
- System: Santiago rapid transit
- Line: Line 6
- Platforms: 2 side platforms
- Tracks: 2
- Connections: Metrotrén, Transantiago buses

History
- Opened: November 2, 2017

Services
Preceding station	Santiago Metro	Following station
Cerrillos Terminus	Line 6	Presidente Pedro Aguirre Cerda towards Los Leones
Location

Lo Valledor is a station on the Santiago Metro in Santiago, Chile. It is underground, between the stations Cerrillos and Presidente Pedro Aguirre Cerda on the same line. It is located on the Carlos Valdovinos Avenue, in the commune of Pedro Aguirre Cerda. It was named after the Lo Valledor Market, the biggest open market for fruits, vegetables, groceries and meat in the country, as well as a neighbourhood in the surrounded area. The station was opened on 2 November 2017 as part of the inaugural section of the line, between Cerrillos and Los Leones.
