= Chile–Sweden relations =

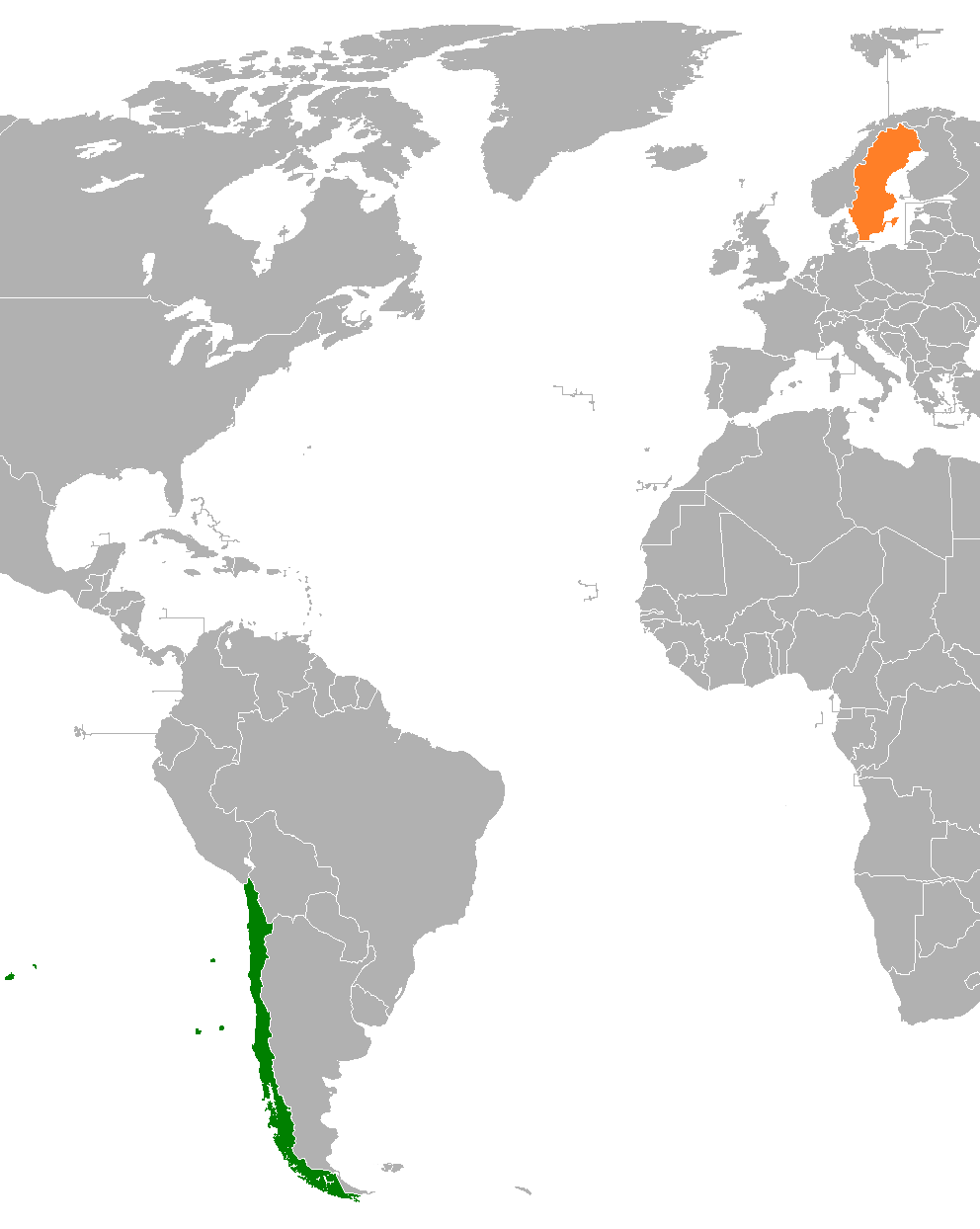
- Chile: Sweden

Chile–Sweden relations refers to the diplomatic relations between Chile and Sweden. Both nations enjoy friendly relations, the importance of which centers on the history of Chilean migration to Sweden during the 1970s. Approximately 100,000 Chileans and their descendants reside in Sweden, making the country home to the third largest Chilean diaspora community (after Argentina and the United States). Both countries are members of the Organisation for Economic Co-operation and Development.

== History ==
=== Early relations ===
Swedish migration to Chile initiated in the late 1700s and early 1800s when Chile was still a part of the Spanish Empire. One notable Swede was Mateo Arnaldo Höevel who fought for Chile during the independence wars and introduced the printing press to the country. In 1827, the Union between Sweden and Norway recognized and established diplomatic relations with a newly independent Chile and signed a Treaty of Friendship. Between 1851–1853, Swedish frigate HSwMS Eugenie became the first Swedish warship to circumnavigate the globe, on a voyage intended to promote Swedish trade. During that time period, the Eugenie called on the port city of Valparaíso.

=== Salvador Allende and the Chilean coup d'état ===
In 1915, Chilean diplomat Agustín Edwards Mac-Clure became the first ambassador to Sweden. In 1969, Swedish Minister of Education (and future Prime Minister) Olof Palme traveled to Chile and met with several Chilean government officials and future Chilean Nobel Prize recipient, Pablo Neruda. In November 1970, Salvador Allende was elected President of Chile, the first from a socialist party. In 1970 Sweden approved providing Chile with development assistance. In 1971, Chile received from Sweden one million and a half Swedish krona. That same year, both nations signed agreements for Chile to purchase weapons and old Swedish warship. In 1972, Chile received 25 million Swedish krona in aide.

In 1972, Swedish ambassador Harald Edelstam arrived to Chile to take up his new post. On 11 September 1973, the government of President Allende suffered a coup d'état by General Augusto Pinochet who was backed by the government of the United States. President Allende was declared to have committed suicide during the coup and General Pinochet took over the government and became the new President of the country. Immediately, President Pinochet began arresting, torturing and executing followers of President Allende. During this time, thousands of Chileans sought refuge in mainly European and Latin American embassies in the Chilean capital. Under Ambassador Edelstam, Sweden opened its doors to asylum seekers. More than 500 Chileans, 54 Uruguayans and some Cubans received refugee in the Swedish embassy. By the end of Pinochet's presidency, more than 40,000 Chileans immigrated to Sweden as political asylees. In December 1973, ambassador Edlestam was declared persona non grata by the Chilean government. When Edelstam was deported from Chile, Swedish Prime Minister Olof Palme declared that there would not be a Swedish ambassador in Chile until democracy was restored in the country, which did not happen until 1990.

=== Present relations ===
When Chile returned to democracy in 1990, both nations normalized relations and accredited ambassadors to their respective governments. In 1990, Chilean President Patricio Aylwin paid a visit to Sweden. In 1996, King Carl XVI Gustaf of Sweden paid an official visit to Chile and met with President Eduardo Frei Ruiz-Tagle. In March 2016, Chilean President Michelle Bachelet was offered a state visit to Sweden by invitation of the King. During her visit, President Bachelet laid a wreath on the tomb of former Prime Minister Olof Palme who played a decisive role in accepting Chilean refugees to Sweden. President Bachelet also met with business leaders and members of the Chilean community in Sweden.

In late 2017, the Santiago Metro station Los Leones received a MetroArte work on the tunnel that connects lines 1 and 6, honoring the Nordic country.

In November 2023, Chile honored former Swedish Prime Minister Olof Palme with a postage stamp

== High-level visits ==
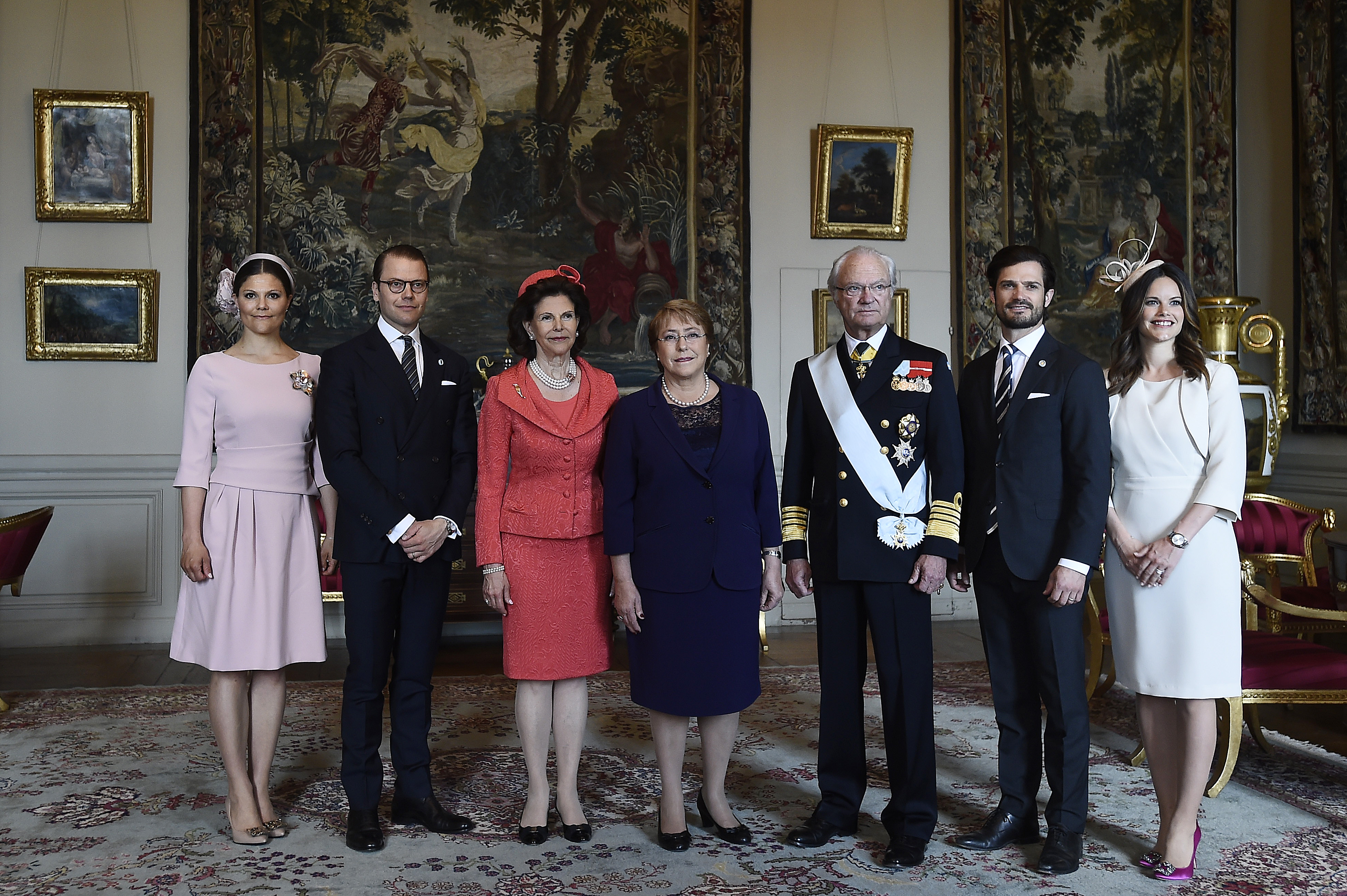
State visit of President Michelle Bachelet to Sweden; 2016

High-level visits from Chile to Sweden

- President Patricio Aylwin (1990)
- President Ricardo Lagos (2002, 2005)
- President Michelle Bachelet (2016)

High-level visits from Sweden to Chile

- King Carl XVI Gustaf of Sweden (1996)
- Prime Minister Göran Persson (2003)
- Prime Minister Fredrik Reinfeldt (2011)

== Agreements ==
Both nations have signed several bilateral agreements, such as an Agreement on Trade (1953); Air Transport Agreement (1957); Agreement on Cooperation and Friendship (1991); Agreement on Social Security (1995); Agreement to Implement Horizontal Cooperation and Economic Cooperation for Development (1998); Agreement to Avoid Double Taxation (2004); Memorandum of Understanding on Cooperation on Green Technologies and Sustainable Urban Development (2011); Memorandum of Understanding on Cooperation on Sustainable Forest Management (2011); Memorandum of Understanding on Sustainable and Innovative Mining Cooperation (2011) and a Memorandum of Understanding on Corporate Social Responsibility Cooperation (2012).

== Trade ==
In 2002, Chile signed a free trade agreement with the European Union (which includes Sweden). In 2016, trade between Chile and Sweden totaled US$481 million. Chile's main exports to Sweden include: Copper, wine, lumber and fruits. Sweden's main exports to Chile include: Machinery and transport equipment, manufactured equipment, chemicals and related products, food and live animals, beverages and tobacco. Swedish multinational companies such as AstraZeneca, Ericsson, H&M, Saab Group and Volvo operate in Chile. Chile is Sweden's third largest trading partner in Latin America.

== Resident diplomatic missions ==
- Chile has an embassy in Stockholm and a consulate-general in Gothenburg.
- Sweden has an embassy in Santiago.
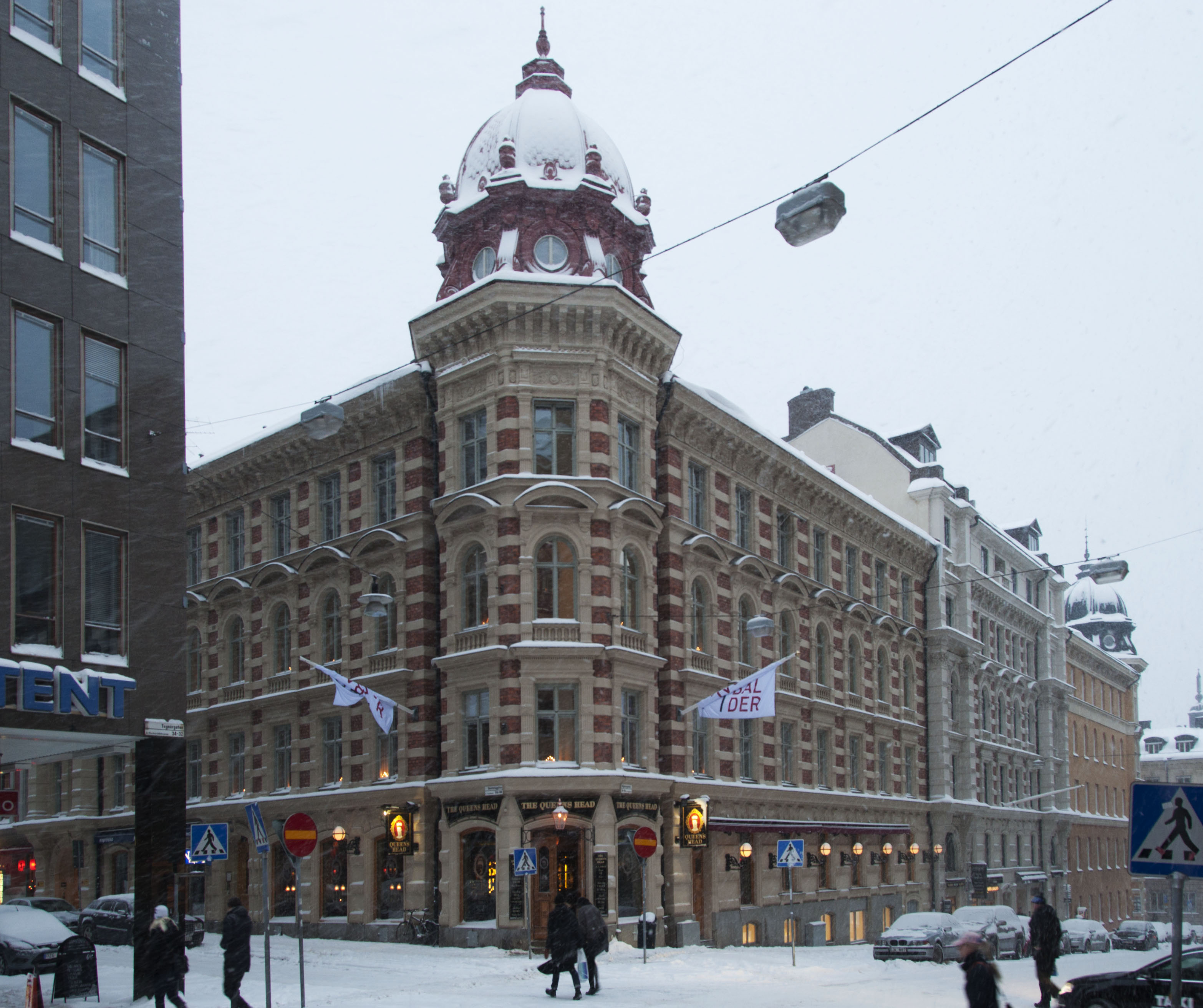
Embassy of Chile in Stockholm

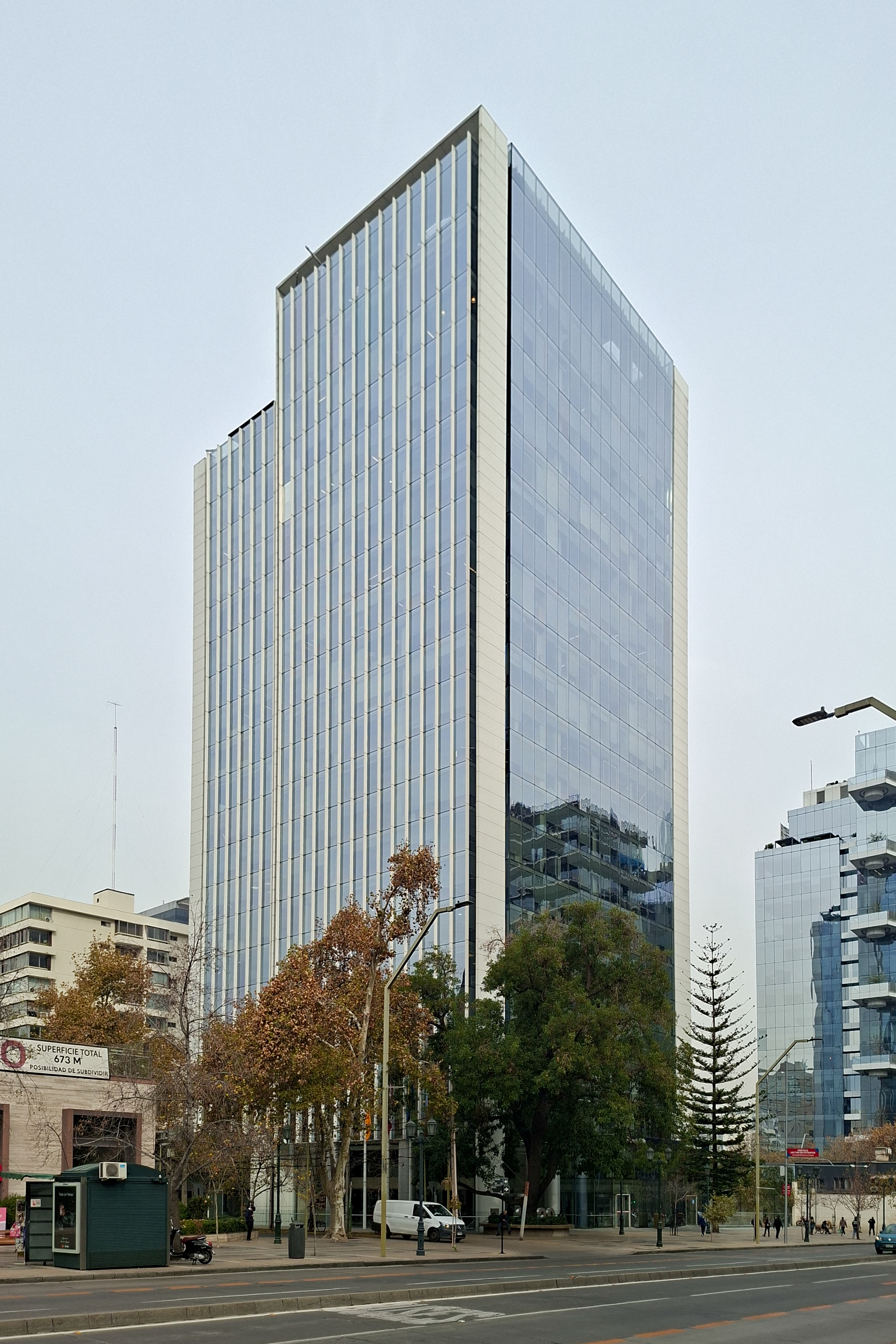
Building hosting the Embassy of Sweden in Santiago

== See also ==
- Foreign relations of Chile
- Foreign relations of Sweden
- Chilean Swedes
