= Villa Mexico =

Villa Mexico is a town located in the communes of Cerrillos and Maipu, in the metropolitan area of Santiago, Chile. It borders the Vespucio Sur Highway in the north; and Calle Los Tilos, in the east; with Esquina Blanca Avenue to the south; and El Ferrocarril Avenue, to the west.

== Location ==
The Villa Mexico is close to Plaza Oeste Mall and the Plaza de Armas of Maipu. Currently, in the former premises FISA (located south of Villa Mexico, crossing Esquina Blanca) there a mall, Portal Maipu that although was previously called Melipilla Road Mall, a holding Cencosud, which already has an Easy homecenter (opened in March 2008). Its construction will include a Jumbo supermarket and a Paris store, and several smaller shops and services.

== History ==
Its design and construction was within a housing plan for professionals and technicians in the public sector developed by the Corvi and Públios Safety employees. They had saved to buy homes but the homes were given to labor organizations and workers of lower rank that by act of force had taken the departments under the government of Unity People. This caused the socialist government of Allende to order the registration property on behalf of the occupants.
