= Inés de Suárez metro station =

Santiago metro station

Inés de Suárez
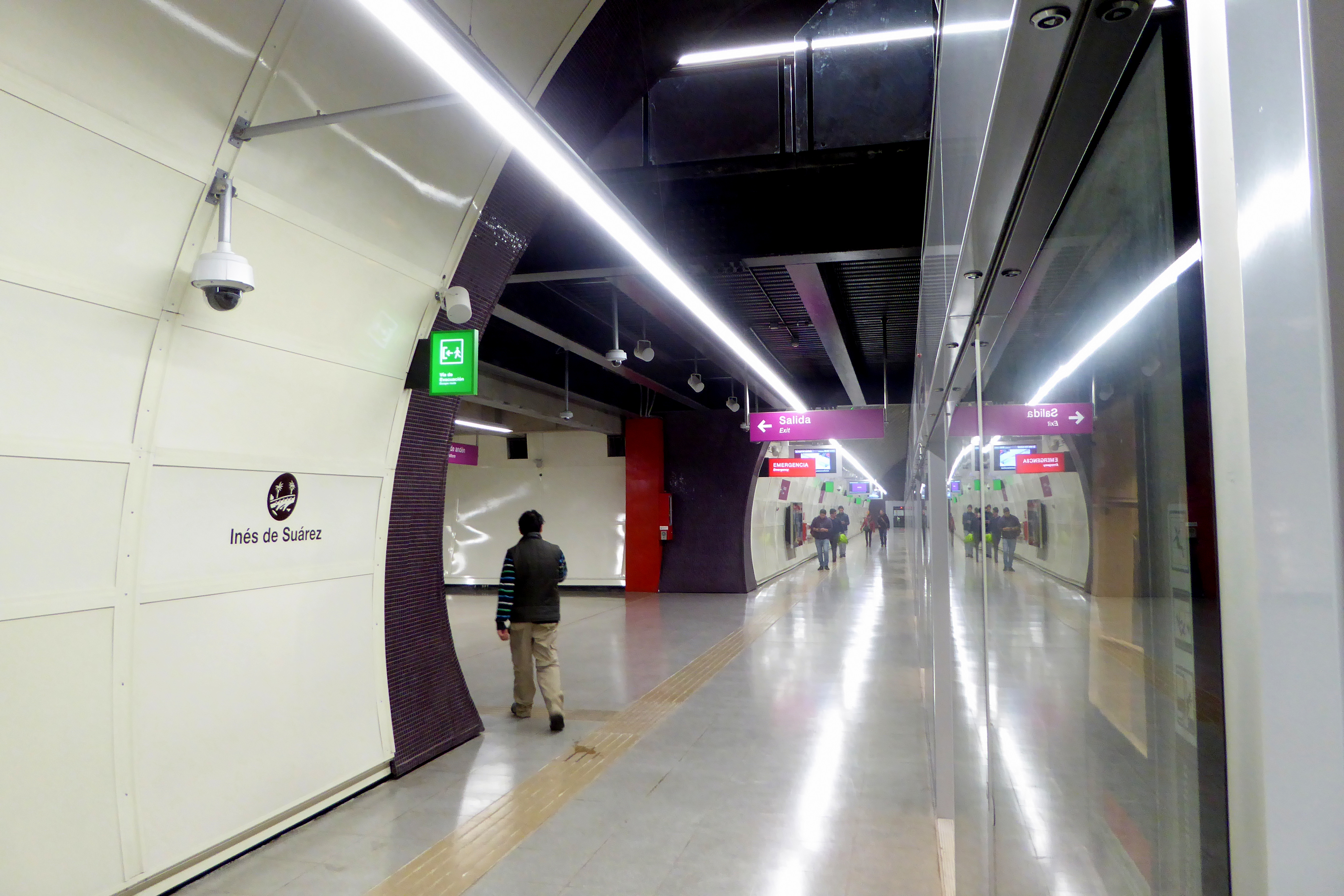

General information
- Coordinates: 33°26′18.4″S 70°36′24.2″W
- System: Santiago rapid transit
- Line: Line 6
- Platforms: 2 side platforms
- Tracks: 2
- Connections: Transantiago buses

Construction
- Accessible: yes

History
- Opened: November 2, 2017

Services
Preceding station	Santiago Metro	Following station
Ñuñoa towards Cerrillos	Line 6	Los Leones Terminus
Location

Inés de Suárez is an underground metro station on the Line 6 of the Santiago Metro, in Santiago, Chile. This station is named for Inés de Suárez, a woman from Extremadura who was a companion and a one-time lover of the conqueror Pedro de Valdivia, who took an important part of the control in the defense of the city of Santiago against the indigenous resistance. A short distance from the station is the Inés de Suarez Park and the Plaza Pedro de Valdivia. The station was opened on 2 November 2017 as part of the inaugural section of the line, between Cerrillos and Los Leones.
