= Ñuble Province =

Ñuble Province may refer to:

- Ñuble Province (1848–1974), a former province (first-level administrative division) of Chile
- Ñuble Province (1974–2018), a former province (second-level administrative division) of Chile
- Ñuble Region, a current region of Chile

== See also ==
- Ñuble (disambiguation)
