= Cerrillos, Chile =

Cerrillos
- Commune
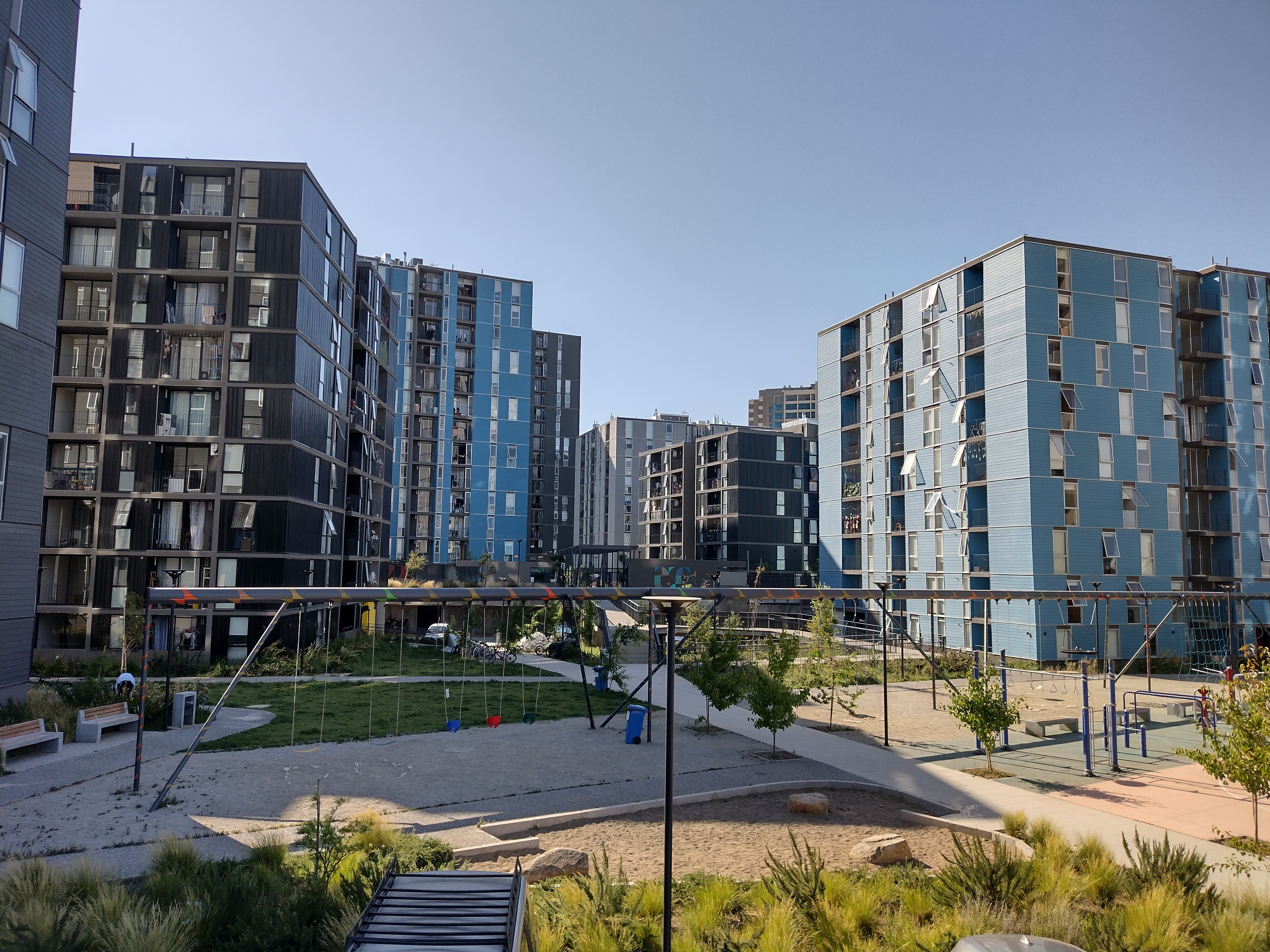
- Villa Panamericana

- Coat of arms Map of Cerrillos within Greater Santiago Location in Chile
- Coordinates (city): 33°30′S 70°43′W
- Country: Chile
- Region: Santiago Metropolitan Region
- Province: Santiago
- Founded: 17 March 1991

Government
  - Type: Municipality
  - Alcalde: Johnny Yáñez (Ind.)

Area
  - Total: 21.0 km^{2} (8.1 sq mi)
- Elevation: 517 m (1,696 ft)

Population (2024)
  - Total: 85,041
  - Density: 4,050/km^{2} (10,500/sq mi)
  - Urban: 85,041
  - Rural: 0
- Demonym: Cerrillano
- Time zone: UTC-4 (CLT)
  - Summer (DST): UTC-3 (CLST)
- Area code: 56 +
- Website: Municipality of Cerrillos

Cerrillos (Spanish for 'Hillocks') is a commune in the southwest of the city of Santiago in the Santiago Province of the Santiago Metropolitan Region in Chile. The commune was created in 1991 from a subdivision of Maipú. It has 85,041 inhabitants.

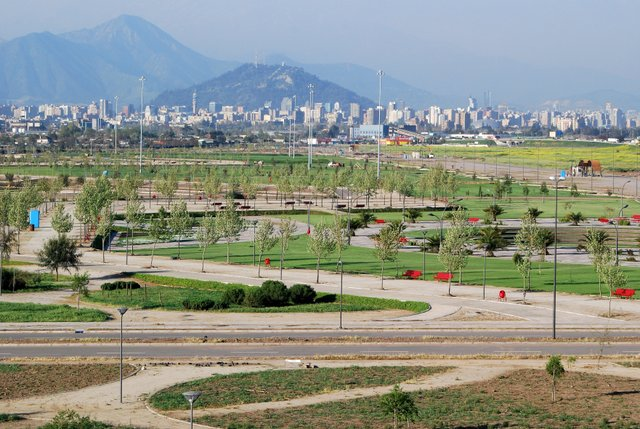
Cerrillos Park in 2013

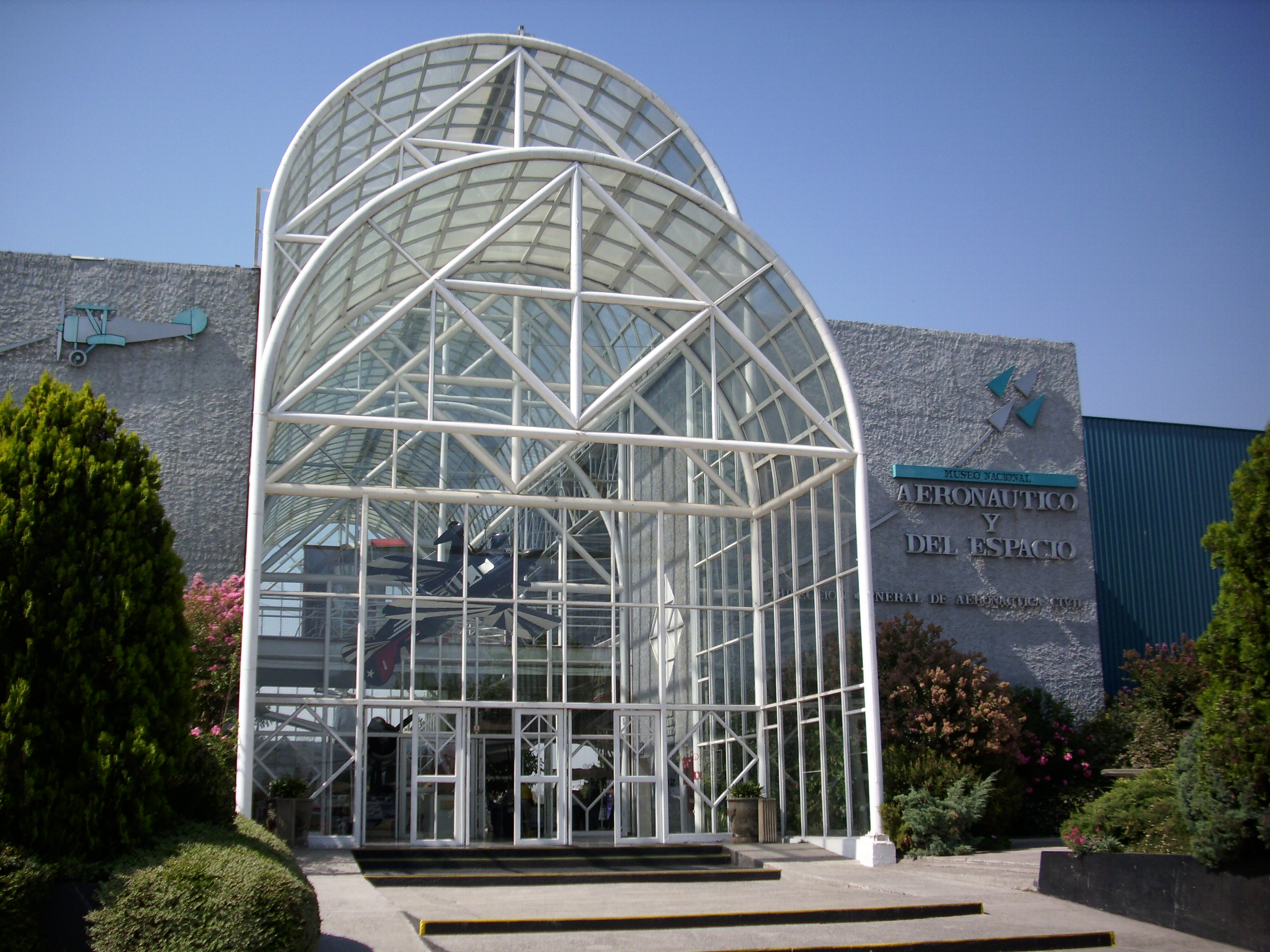
Museo Nacional Aeronáutico y del Espacio.

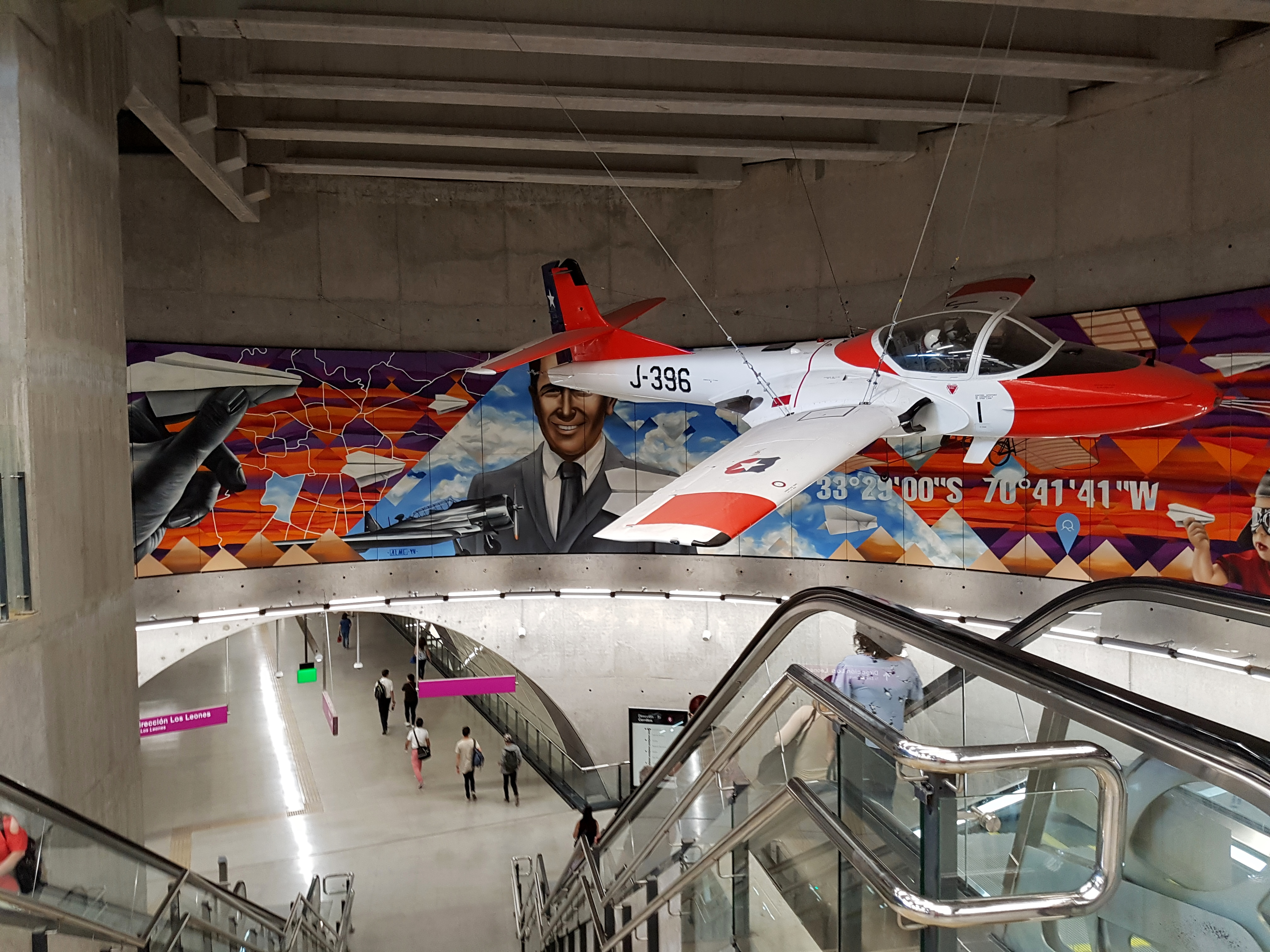
Cerrillos metro station mural

== Demographics ==
As of the 2024 census, the population is 85,041, of which 48.5% are male and 51.5% are female. People under 15 years old make up 18.7% of the population, and people over 65 years old make up 13.0%. 100% of the population is urban.

Historical population
Year	Pop.	±% p.a.
1970	34,903	—
1982	67,013	+5.59%
1992	72,649	+0.81%
2002	71,906	−0.10%
2017	80,832	+0.78%
2024	85,041	+0.73%
Source: INE, Memoria Chilena

- Average annual household income: US$22,234 (PPP, 2006)
- Population below poverty line: 8.3% (2006)
- Regional quality of life index: 72.93, medium, 32 out of 52 (2005)
- Human Development Index: 0.743, 54 out of 341 (2003)

=== Immigration ===
As of the 2024 census, immigrants make up 15.0% of the population - 9.6% are from South America, 5.1% from North America, 0.1% from Europe, 0.1% from Asia, 0.005% from Africa, and 0.002% from Oceania.

== Administration ==
As a commune, Cerrillos is a third-level administrative division of Chile administered by a municipal council, headed by an alcalde who is directly elected every four years. The 2024-2028 mayor is Johnny Yáñez (Ind), and the council has the following members:

- Luis Leiva Godoy (FA)
- Josefina Osorio Oviedo (PAVP)
- Roxana Muñoz Daza (PR)
- Juan Jiménez Retamal (RN)
- Daivit Mellado Ramírez (Ind)
- Carolina Burgos Alarcón (REP)

Within the electoral divisions of Chile, Cerillos is represented in the Chamber of Deputies as a part of the 20th electoral district (together with Estación Central and Maipú). The commune is represented in the Senate as part of the 7th senatorial constituency (Santiago-West).

== See also ==
- Villa Mexico (small town of cerrillos)
- Mosacat
