= Cerrillos metro station =

Santiago metro station

Cerrillos
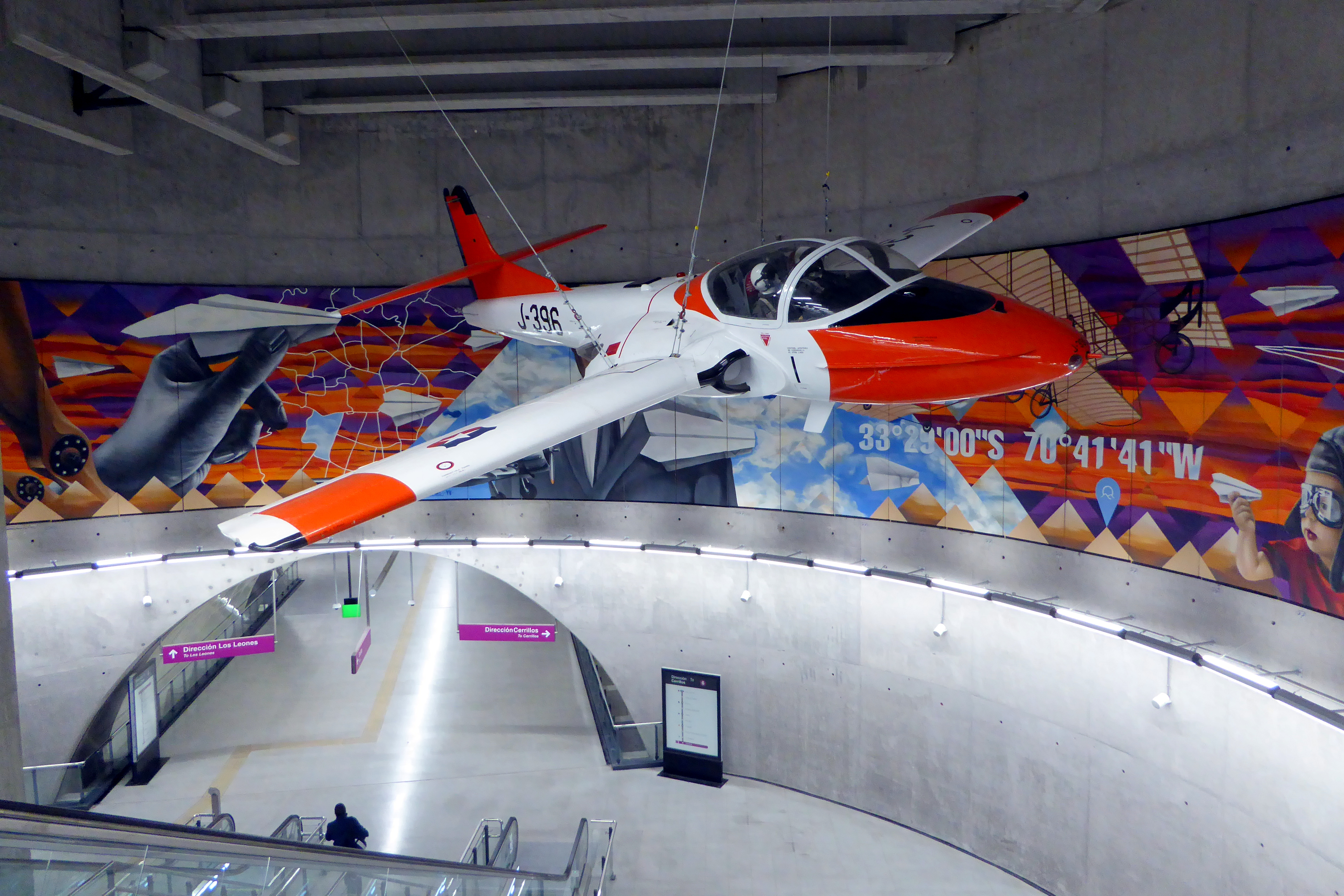
- Work «The dream of flying» by José «Alme» Yutronic, located inside the station. It is a Cessna T-37 Tweet of the FACH.

General information
- Location: Pedro Aguirre Cerda Avenue / Departamental Avenue
- Coordinates: 33°29′00″S 70°41′41″W
- System: Santiago rapid transit
- Line: Line 6
- Platforms: 2 side platforms
- Tracks: 2
- Connections: Transantiago buses

Construction
- Accessible: yes

History
- Opened: November 2, 2017

Services
Preceding station	Santiago Metro	Following station
Terminus	Line 6	Lo Valledor towards Los Leones
Location

Cerrillos is an underground metro station and the southern terminal station of Line 6 of the Santiago Metro network, in Santiago, Chile. It is underground, being the terminal station of Line 6, preceded by the Lo Valledor station. It is located at the intersection of Pedro Aguirre Cerda-Camino a Melipilla avenues with Departamental-Buzeta. The station was opened on 2 November 2017 as part of the inaugural section of the line, between Cerrillos and Los Leones.

== Etymology ==
The station is located in the municipality of Cerrillos. The name of the district is reminiscent of the closed Los Cerrillos Airport, located where the Bicentennial Park City is currently located.

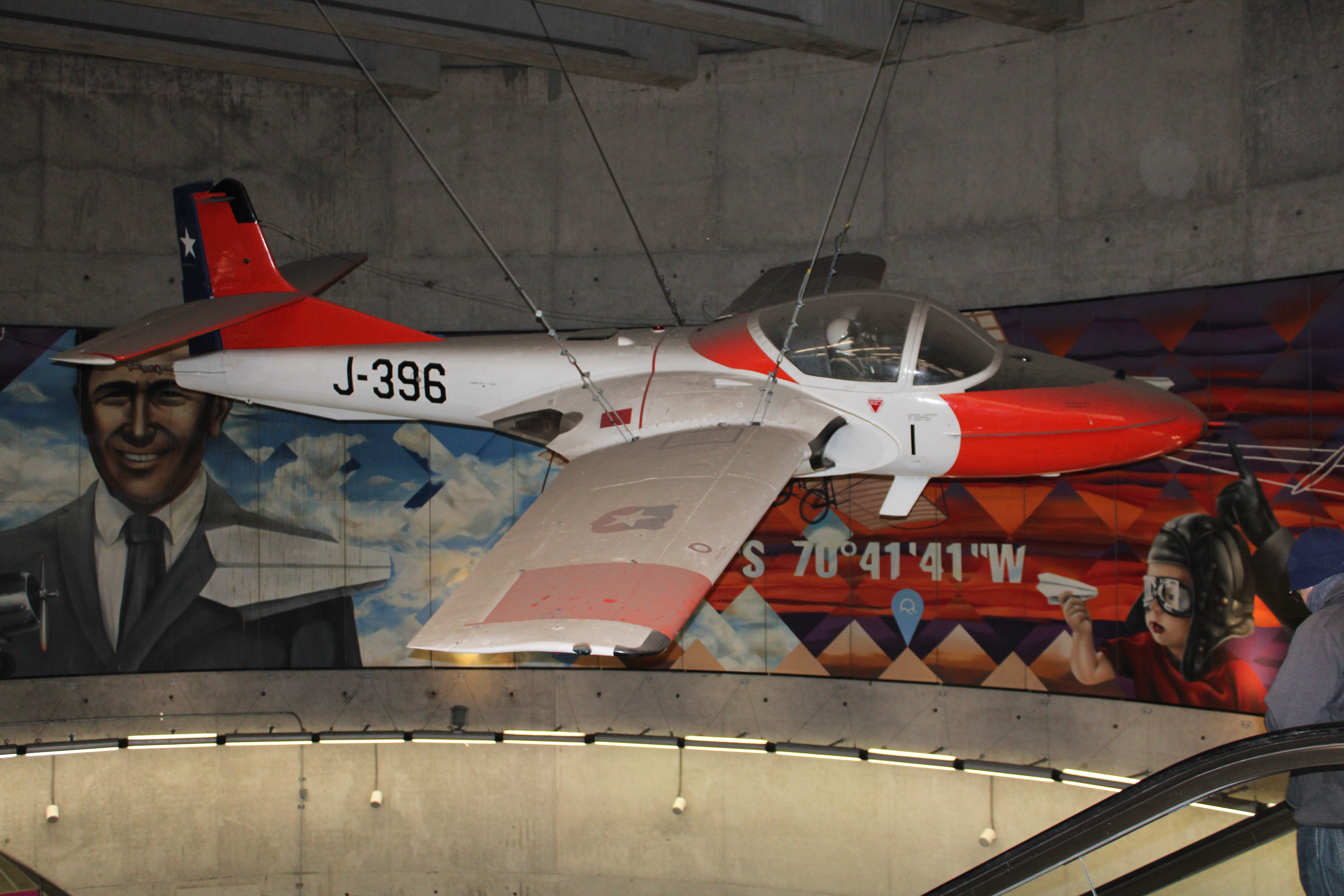
J-396 at display in Metro Cerillos

Originally the station was going to be named as Pedro Aguirre Cerda, however in January 2012 modifications were announced to the route of Line 6, with which the station was renamed Cerrillos.
