= Los Leones metro station =

Santiago metro station

Los Leones
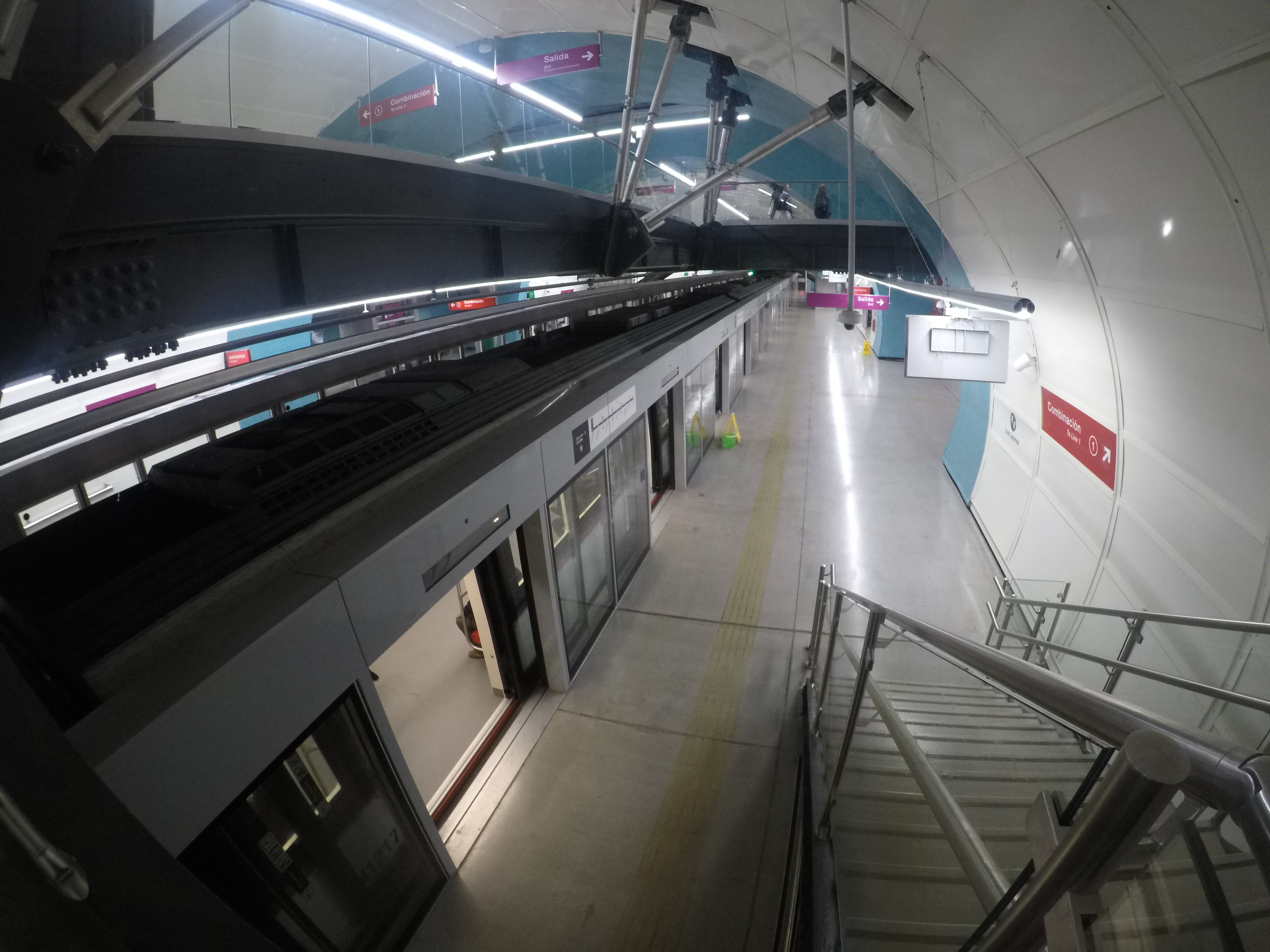
- Platform of the station on Line 6.

General information
- Location: Nueva Providencia Avenue / Ricardo Lyon Avenue
- Coordinates: 33°25′18″S 70°36′35″W
- System: Santiago rapid transit
- Lines: Line 1 Line 6
- Platforms: 4 side platforms
- Tracks: 4
- Connections: Red buses

History
- Opened: August 31, 1980; November 2, 2017; 2033

Services
Preceding station	Santiago Metro	Following station
Pedro de Valdivia towards San Pablo	Line 1	Tobalaba towards Los Dominicos
Inés de Suárez towards Cerrillos	Line 6	Terminus
Location

Los Leones is a station of the line 1 of the Santiago Metro in Chile, and is the northern terminus of the line 6. The station is named for the nearby Los Leones Avenue. Located in the heart of the commercial area of Providencia, some of its entrances are integrated into the retail lower levels of buildings.

A ceramic mosaic by the artist Ramón Vergara Grez was installed in 1993.

The Line 1 station was opened on 22 August 1980 as part of the extension of the line from Salvador to Escuela Militar. It became an interchange station between Line 1 and Line 6 on 2 November 2017 when the inaugural section of Line 6, between Cerrillos and Los Leones, was opened.

It is expected that by 2033 this station will be combined with the future Line 8.
