= Echeverría metro station (Santiago) =

Ghost station in Santiago Metro

Echeverría
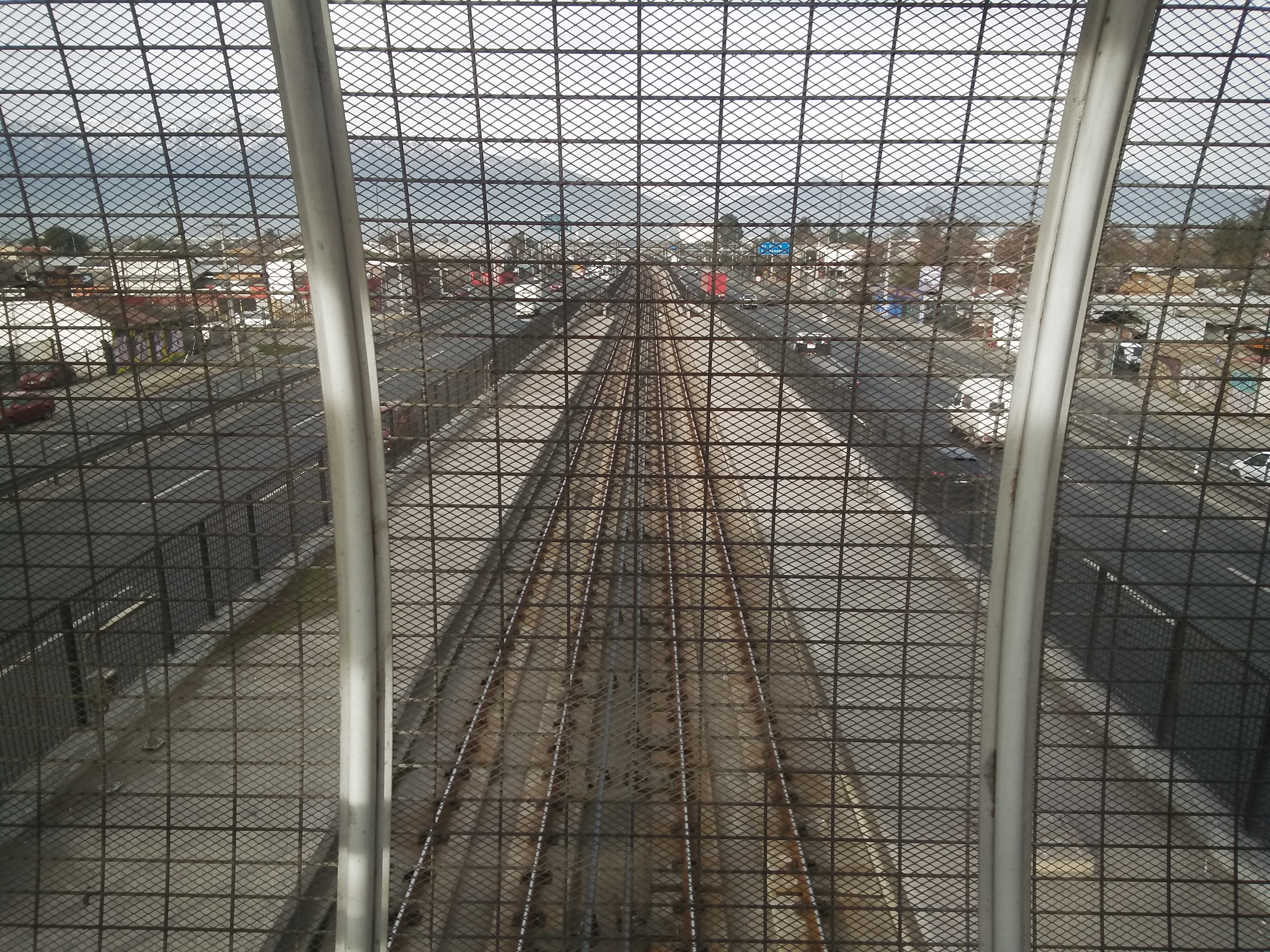
- View of the platforms from the walkway

General information
- Location: Vespucio Sur Freeway / Ignacio Echeverría/Peró
- System: Santiago rapid transit
- Line: Line 4A
- Platforms: 2 side platforms
- Tracks: 2

Construction
- Accessible: yes

History
- Opened: Never opened

Services
Preceding station	Santiago Metro	Following station
La Cisterna Terminus	Line 4A	San Ramón towards Vicuña Mackenna
Location

Echeverría is a ghost station that was projected on line 4A of the Santiago Metro. It is located between La Cisterna and San Ramón stations, along the central axis of the Vespucio Sur Freeway, between Blas Vial and María Vial streets in the commune of La Cisterna, specifically at the intersection of Américo Vespucio with Ignacio Echeverría streets (on the north road) and Peró (on the south road).

This station was half-way built, with only the platforms and the walkway that crosses the highway being finished, with the station building, stairs, elevators, turnstiles and the mezzanine (where the ticket offices would be located) still to be built.

The main reason for its non-construction lies in the residential sector in its immediate surroundings, which would not reach the density that justifies its existence. It is possible that it will materialize in the coming years, to increase the population density in the sector.
