= Santa Rosa metro station (Santiago) =

Santiago metro station

Coordinates: 33°32′32.61″S 70°38′3.11″W

Santa Rosa
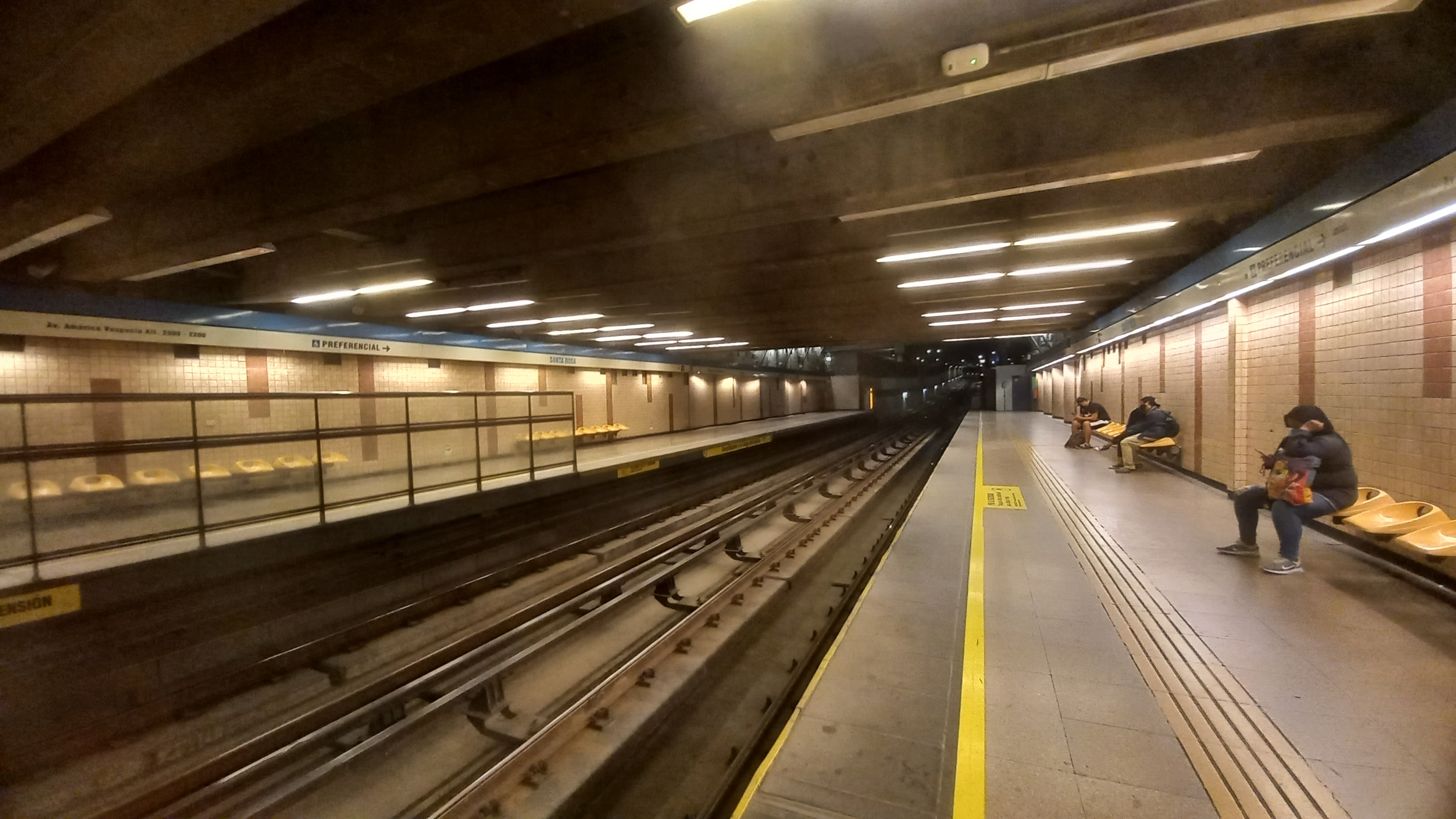

General information
- Location: Vespucio Sur Freeway / Santa Rosa Avenue.
- System: Santiago rapid transit
- Line: Line 4A
- Platforms: 2 side platforms
- Tracks: 2
- Connections: Red buses

Construction
- Accessible: yes

History
- Opened: August 16, 2006; 2030

Services
Preceding station	Santiago Metro	Following station
San Ramón towards La Cisterna	Line 4A	La Granja towards Vicuña Mackenna
Location

Santa Rosa station is an embanked metro station located on Line 4A of the Santiago Metro in Santiago, Chile, between the La Granja and San Ramón stations and also between the communes of the same names La Granja and San Ramón. It lies along the Vespucio Sur Freeway, on its junction with Santa Rosa Avenue. The station was opened on 16 August 2006 as part of the inaugural section of the line between Vicuña Mackenna and La Cisterna.

At the station surroundings are the La Granja town hall, an Inmaculate Conception shrine, the Espacio Matta cultural centre, and the San Francisco High School. The station has four entrances all located in Santa Rosa Avenue, with disabled accessibility.

It is expected that by 2030 this station will be combined with the future Line 9.

== Etymology ==
The station is named after Santa Rosa Avenue where it is located, which is one of the most important thoroughfares in Santiago, crossing the city from north to south through the communes of Santiago, San Miguel, San Joaquín, La Granja, San Ramón, La Pintana and Puente Alto.
