= Santiago Metro Line 4A =

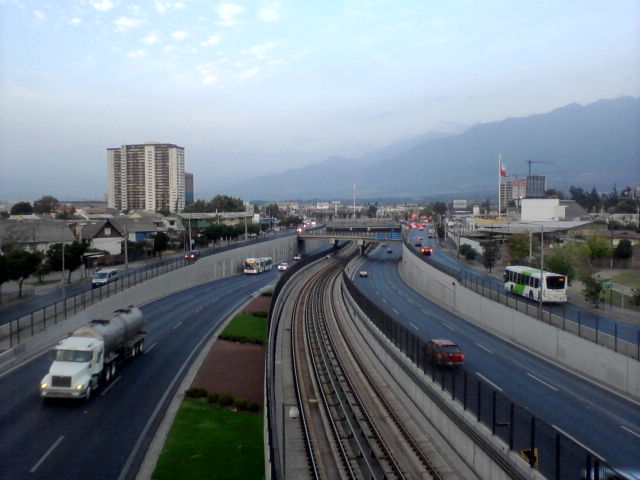
- The rail line south of its northeastern terminal

Overview
- Status: Operational
- Owner: Empresa de Transporte de Pasajeros Metro S.A.
- Locale: Santiago
- Termini: La Cisterna; Vicuña Mackenna
- Stations: 6

Service
- Type: Rapid transit
- System: Santiago Metro
- Services: 1
- Operator: Empresa de Transporte de Pasajeros Metro S.A.
- Depot: none (shares stock with line 4)
- Rolling stock: Alstom AS 2002
- Daily ridership: 56,400 (2015)

History
- Opened: August 16, 2006; 20 years ago

Technical
- Line length: 7.7 km (4.8 mi)
- Num of tracks: 2
- Character: Open-cut and underground
- Track gauge: 1,435 mm (4 ft 8 1/2 in) standard gauge
- Electrification: 750 V DC third rail
- Operating speed: 80 km/h (50 mph)

Santiago Metro Line 4A is one of the seven lines that currently make up the Santiago Metro network in Santiago, Chile. It has six stations and 7.7 km (4.8 mi) of track, making it the smallest line of the network, both in length and stations. The line intersects with Line 2 at La Cisterna, and with Line 4 at Vicuña Mackenna, both being its termini. It will also intersect with the future Line 9 at Santa Rosa station and acts as a link between these two lines. Its distinctive colour on the network line map is light blue.

The line runs through the middle of Américo Vespucio highway in a trench configuration.

In 2015, Line 4A accounted for only 3.1% of all trips made on the metro system with a daily ridership of 56,400; it is the least used line in the system since it does not serve the city centre, as well as being the shortest line in the system.

== History ==
Line 4A was originally conceived as a branch of Line 4, but due to the considerably low demand compared to the Puente Alto service, it was separated from Line 4 and inaugurated as a different line. It was inaugurated by President Michelle Bachelet and opened to the public on August 16, 2006. It runs between La Cisterna station and Vicuña Mackenna station.

On November 29, 2010 Santiago Metro workers struck, halting the service for 17 days. The strike caused major over-crowding on bus services as passengers used them as an alternative to their daily metro rides.

=== Echeverría: The Ghost Station ===
Echeverría metro station, built but never opened to the public, is located between La Cisterna station and San Ramón station on the junction of Blas Vial street and Maria Vial in the commune of La Cisterna. The station remains partially built, with the platforms and footbridge across the highway already finished.

The station has never been completed due to the low density of residents in this area, although it could be finished and opened to the public if the population density increased.

=== Extensions ===
The line may be extended in the future to Del Sol station to connect with Line 5. The trench where the extension would run has already been built between the two lanes of the Autopista Vespucio Sur highway, ready for the extension to be laid down if the population were to increase in that part of the city. If built, the extension would serve the communes of La Cisterna, Lo Espejo, Cerrillos and Maipú.

During his last public address, on June 1, 2025, President Gabriel Boric announced the extension of Line 4A to the municipalities of Lo Espejo, Cerrillos and Maipú, connecting with Del Sol on Line 5. At the same time, it was announced that the line would change its name to Line 10 and the existing stations would be remodeled to meet the modern standards of Line 3 and Line 6. The extension entails 10 more kilometers and 7 new stations that would be delivered no earlier than 2037.

== Stations ==
Stations running from east to west

Stations	Transfers	Location	Opening	Commune	Notes
Vicuña Mackenna		Autopista Vespucio Sur esq. Julio Vildosola		La Florida	
Santa Julia		Autopista Vespucio Sur/Santa Julia		La Florida	
La Granja		Autopista Vespucio Sur/Coronel		La Granja	
Santa Rosa		Autopista Vespucio Sur/Av. Santa Rosa		La Granja/San Ramón	This station will be future combination with the line in 2030.
San Ramón		Autopista Vespucio Sur/Av. La Bandera		San Ramón	
La Cisterna		Autopista Vespucio Sur/Av. José Miguel Carrera		La Cisterna	

== Line 4A Data Sheet ==
- Communes:
  - La Florida
  - La Granja
  - San Ramón
  - La Cisterna
- Track:
  - Américo Vespucio Sur Avenue: 6 stations
- Construction Method: Open-cut and at-grade.
- Opening Date: August 2006

== See also ==
- List of metro systems
- Rail transport in Chile
- Transantiago
