= La Granja metro station (Santiago) =

Santiago metro station

La Granja
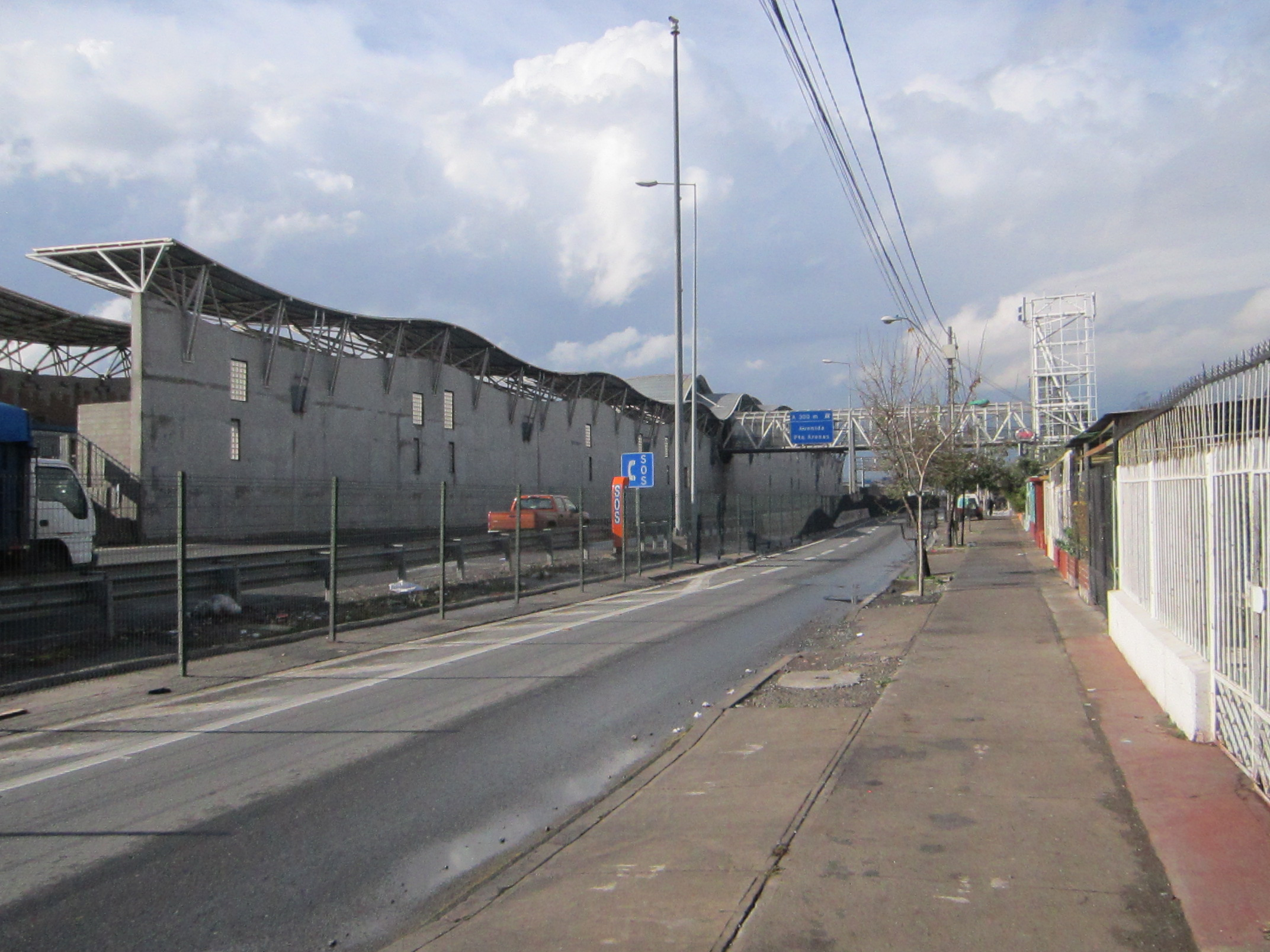

General information
- Location: Vespucio Sur Freeway / Coronel Street.
- Coordinates: 33°32′28″S 70°36′58″W
- System: Santiago rapid transit
- Line: Line 4A
- Platforms: 2 side platforms
- Tracks: 2
- Connections: Transantiago buses

Construction
- Accessible: yes

History
- Opened: August 16, 2006

Services
Preceding station	Santiago Metro	Following station
Santa Rosa towards La Cisterna	Line 4A	Santa Julia towards Vicuña Mackenna
Location

La Granja station is an embanked metro station located on Line 4A of the Santiago Metro in Santiago, Chile. It lies between the Santa Julia and Santa Rosa stations in the commune of the same name, La Granja, and is located along the Autopista Vespucio Sur highway at the junction with Coronel Street. The station was opened on 16 August 2006 as part of the inaugural section of the line between Vicuña Mackenna and La Cisterna.

In the area around the station there are medical centres and commercial centres, and is part of the neighbourhoods of San Gregorio and Millalemu.

The station has four entrances, all located on Santa Rosa Avenue, and also has an access for disabled.

== Etymology ==
The station is named after the commune of the same name, La Granja. According to the Chilean National Statistics Institute census of 2002, La Granja spans an area of 10.1 km^{2} (4 sq mi) and has 132,520 inhabitants (64,750 male and 67,770 female), making the commune an entirely urban area. The population fell by 0.6% (765 persons) between the 1992 and 2002 censuses.

== History and changes in the location ==
The station’s original planned name was “La Serena” after a street of the same name (now itself renamed Cardenal Raúl Silva Henríquez Avenue). Initially it was going to be located at the intersection of Américo Vespucio Avenue, La Serena Street and an entry ramp to the Ruta del Maipo Highway, which connects southern Santiago with the Pan-American Highway. However, delays in the construction of the Autopista del Maipo and the parallel construction of Metro Line 4A and the Vespucio Sur Freeway meant that the station was moved to the latter-highway's junction with Coronel Street. The station’s planned name was temporarily changed to “Coronel” before the authorities settled on its current name of La Granja.
