= Santa Julia metro station =

Santiago metro station

Santa Julia

General information
- Location: Vespucio Sur Freeway / Santa Julia Street
- Coordinates: 33°31′52.29″S 70°36′20.17″W
- System: Santiago rapid transit
- Line: Line 4A
- Platforms: 2 side platforms
- Tracks: 2
- Connections: Transantiago buses

Construction
- Accessible: yes

History
- Opened: August 16, 2006

Services
Preceding station	Santiago Metro	Following station
La Granja towards La Cisterna	Line 4A	Vicuña Mackenna Terminus
Location

Santa Julia station is an embanked metro station located on Line 4A of the Santiago Metro in Santiago, Chile, between Vicuña Mackenna station and La Granja station in the commune of La Florida. It lies along the Vespucio Sur Freeway at the junction with Santa Julia Street. The station was opened on 16 August 2006 as part of the inaugural section of the line between Vicuña Mackenna and La Cisterna.

The area around the station is mainly residential and contains the Villa O’Higgins Family Health Center (Spanish: Centro de Salud Familiar Villa O’Higgins). The station also has disabled access.

== Etymology ==
The station is named after the avenue at whose junction it is located Santa Julia Avenue.
