= Príncipe de Gales metro station =

Santiago metro station

Príncipe de Gales
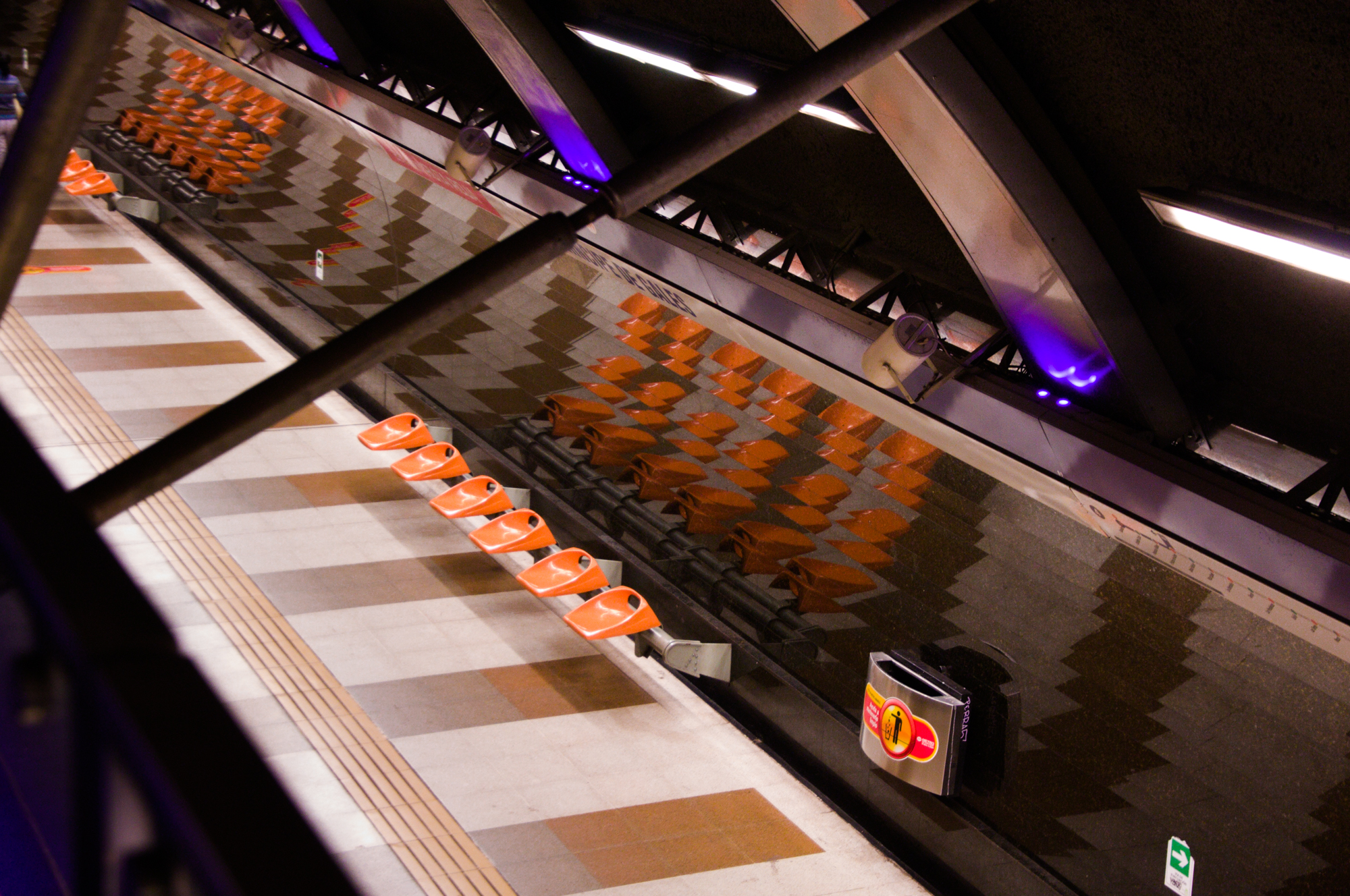
- One of the side platforms as seen from a walkway that is suspended by steel rods

General information
- Location: Tobalaba Avenue / Príncipe de Gales Avenue
- Coordinates: 33°26′20.89″S 70°34′23.20″W
- System: Santiago rapid transit
- Line: Line 4
- Platforms: 2 side platforms
- Tracks: 2
- Connections: Transantiago buses

Construction
- Accessible: yes

History
- Opened: November 30, 2005

Services
Preceding station	Santiago Metro	Following station
Francisco Bilbao towards Tobalaba	Line 4	Simón Bolívar towards Plaza de Puente Alto
Location

Príncipe de Gales is an underground metro station on the Line 4 of the Santiago Metro, in Santiago, Chile. South of this station, Line 4 runs under Américo Vespucio Avenue, which in this section takes the name of Ossa Avenue. The station was opened on 30 November 2005 as part of the inaugural section of the line between Tobalaba and Grecia.
