= List of mayors of La Cisterna =

This is a list of mayors of the Chilean commune of La Cisterna, part of Greater Santiago in the Santiago Metropolitan Region.

Mayor	Party	Took office	Left office
Iván Moreira Barros	UDI	1989	26 September 1992
Rodolfo Pereira Albornoz	DC	26 September 1992	6 December 1994
Marcelo Serres Henríquez	DC	6 December 1994	6 December 1996
Hernán Rojo Avendaño	DC	6 December 1996	6 December 2000
Héctor Silva Muñoz	UDI	6 December 2000	6 December 2004
Santiago Rebolledo Pizarro	PPD	6 December 2004	28 June 2021
Joel Olmos Espinoza	IND	28 June 2021	Incumbent
