= San Ramón metro station =

Santiago metro station

Coordinates: 33°32′28.21″S 70°38′35.78″W

San Ramón
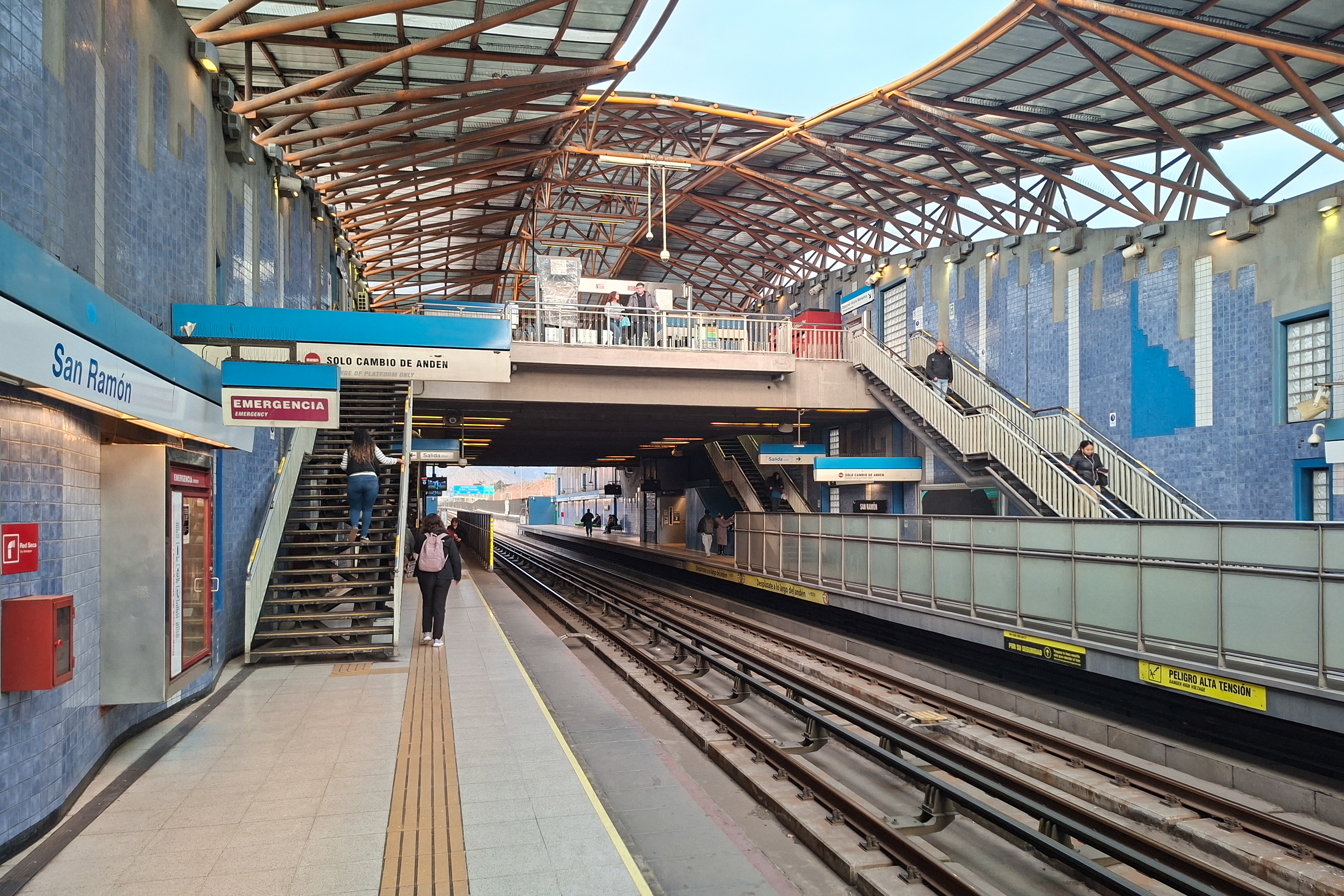

General information
- Location: Vespucio Sur Freeway / Almirante Latorre Street
- System: Santiago rapid transit
- Line: Line 4A
- Platforms: 2 side platforms
- Tracks: 2
- Connections: Transantiago buses

Construction
- Accessible: yes

History
- Opened: August 16, 2006

Services
Preceding station	Santiago Metro	Following station
La Cisterna Terminus	Line 4A	Santa Rosa towards Vicuña Mackenna
Location

San Ramón station is a metro station located on Line 4A of the Santiago Metro in Santiago, Chile between Santa Rosa and La Cisterna station. It lies along the Vespucio Sur Freeway, near its junction with Almirante Latorre Street. The station has disabled access. The station was opened on 16 August 2006 as part of the inaugural section of the line between Vicuña Mackenna and La Cisterna.

In the surrounding area can be found the San Ramón commune municipality building and La Bandera Park.

== Etymology ==
The station is named after San Ramón commune, where it is located.
