= Woodbury–Story House =

Historic house in California, United States

- U.S. National Register of Historic Places
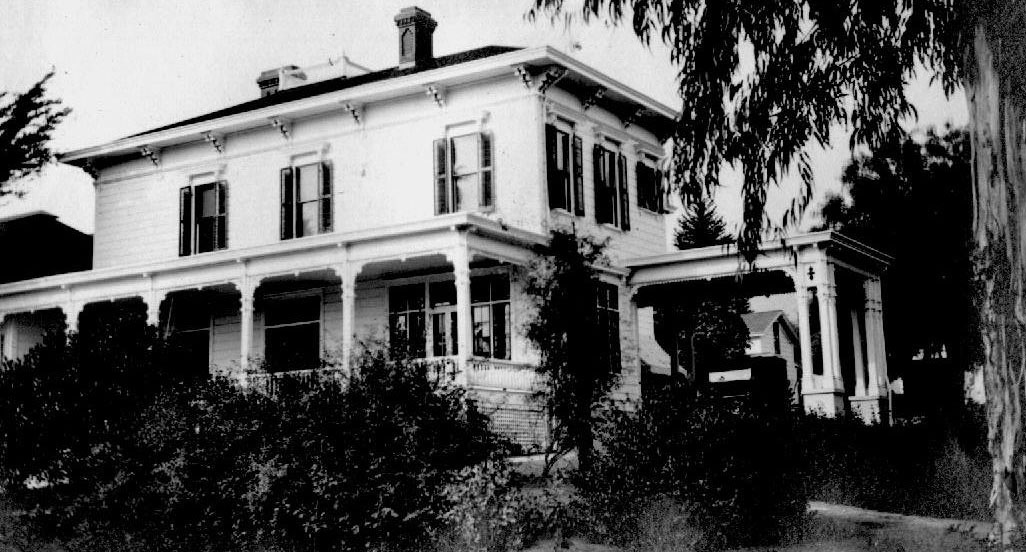

- Location within the Los Angeles metropolitan area Location within California Location within the United States
- Location: 2606 N. Madison Ave; Altadena, California
- Coordinates: 34°11′21″N 118°08′00″W
- Architect: Harry Ridgway
- NRHP reference No.: 93001463
- Added to NRHP: December 30, 1993

The Woodbury–Story House is a National Register of Historic Places structure (site #93001463) in Altadena, California. It was placed on the Register in 1993 for its significance as an example of Italianate and Colonial Revival architecture styles and its association with Capt. Frederick Woodbury, one of the founders of Altadena. It is currently used as a filming location.

== History ==
The home was built in 1882 for Capt. Frederick Woodbury, and his wife, Martha. The home was the headquarters for a ranch that included a two-story bunkhouse for the ranch hands. Citrus groves and vineyards were planted on the land. Woodbury planted the deodar cedars that line the contemporary Santa Rosa Ave., also known as Christmas Tree Lane, another National Register site. In 1892, Woodbury sold the home to a man named Walker, who in turn sold it to Hampton L. Story in 1894. During the decades following Story's death, the home became a coffee shop, sheriff's station, a fire engine house, office building and a tea house. It is currently used as a filming location.

On January 7, 2025, the home was damaged by the Eaton Fire. According to a GoFundMe campaign, the home needed a deep cleaning to remove toxic smoke damage, repainting of the interior and exterior due to smoke, ash, and ember damage, restoration of numerous wood windows and vintage glass, and repair of Victorian wooden details and damaged roof from the high winds.

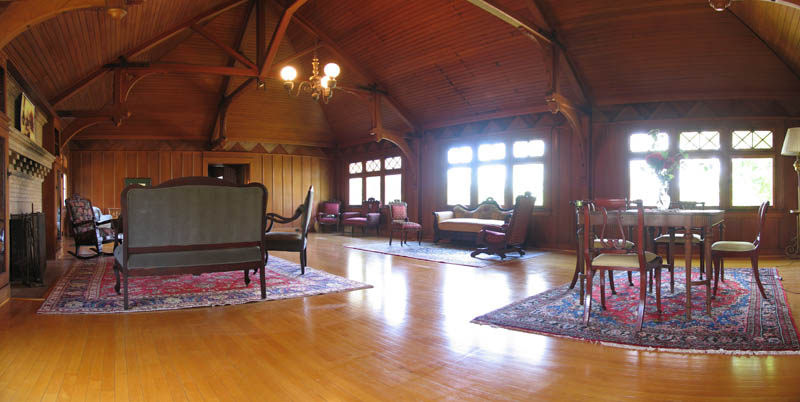
The Music Room designed by Frederick Roehrig

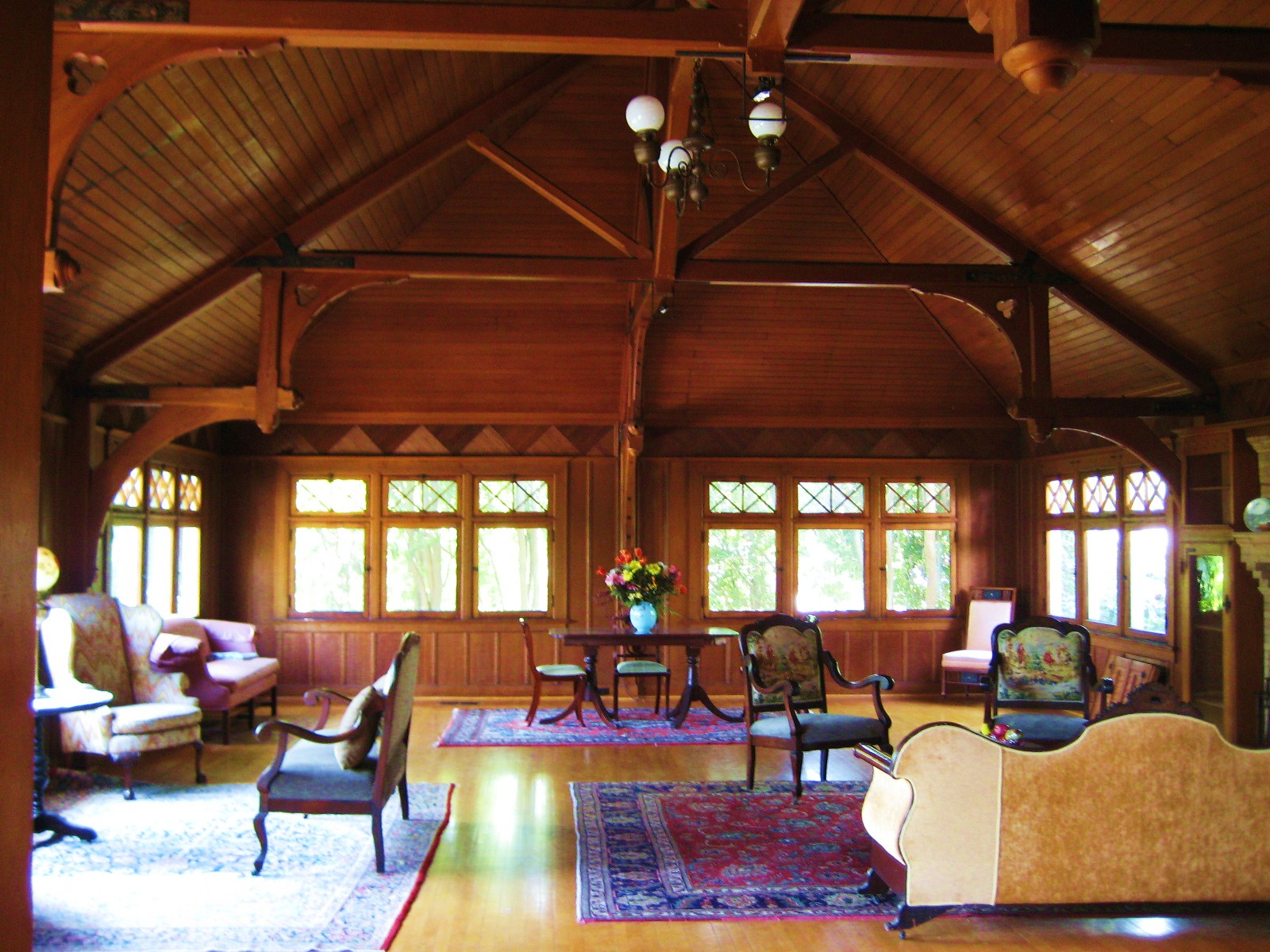
The Music Room

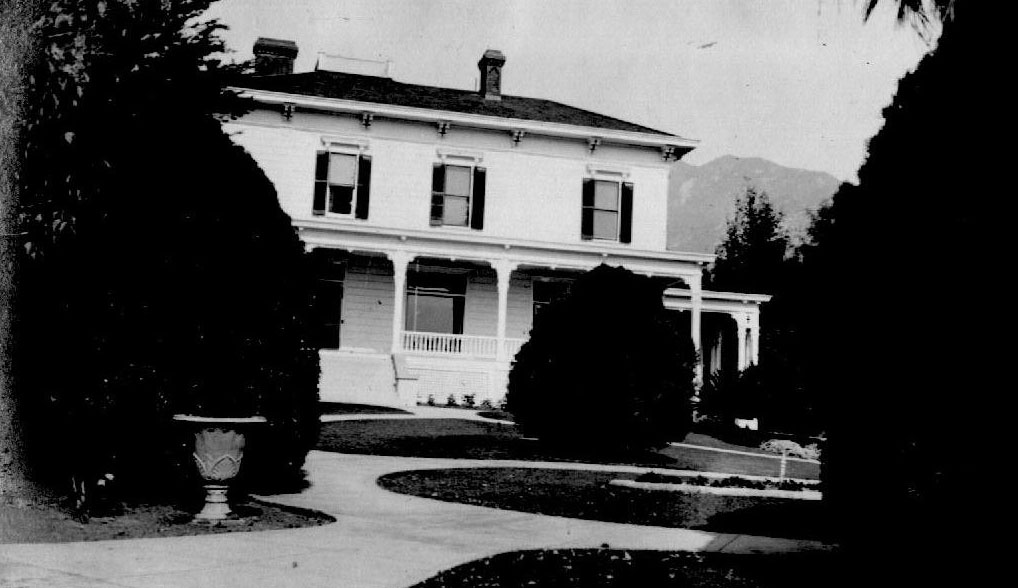

== In popular culture ==
This property has been used as the filming location for various movies, which include Amityville Horror: The Evil Escapes (1989), Attack of the Killer Doughnuts (2010), V/H/S (Or more specifically the segment by Radio Silence, '10/31/98') (2012) Unconscious (2014) and Keep Watching (2017). It was used as a film location (a primary home interior) in Ari Aster's short film The Strange Thing About the Johnsons (2011) which he created at the American Film Institute Conservatory as his thesis film. It was also used in the (2011) music video, Sail by AWOLNATION. SAIL

The home was first reported as a Haunted House in the book "Haunted Houses of Pasadena" by Michael J. Kouri, which covers Altadena, Pasadena and other parts of the original Spanish land grant known as Rancho el Rincon de San Pasqual. The author personally investigated the Woodbury/Story house over twenty-five years ago. Photos of the ghosts who haunt the mansion were shown in his book and will appear in the book "Historical Hauntings in Altadena, California" when it is released in October 2020.

=== Television ===
The Woodbury–Story House was used as a filming location in the season 7 episode of American Horror Story entitled "Winter of Discontent". It aired on October 24, 2017, on the cable network FX.

The paranormal reality television series Ghost Adventures covered the story of the Woodbury–Story House, in the episode "The Woodbury: Home of American Horror Story" on the Travel Channel in 2019.
