= Christmas Tree Lane =

- U.S. National Register of Historic Places
- California Historical Landmark
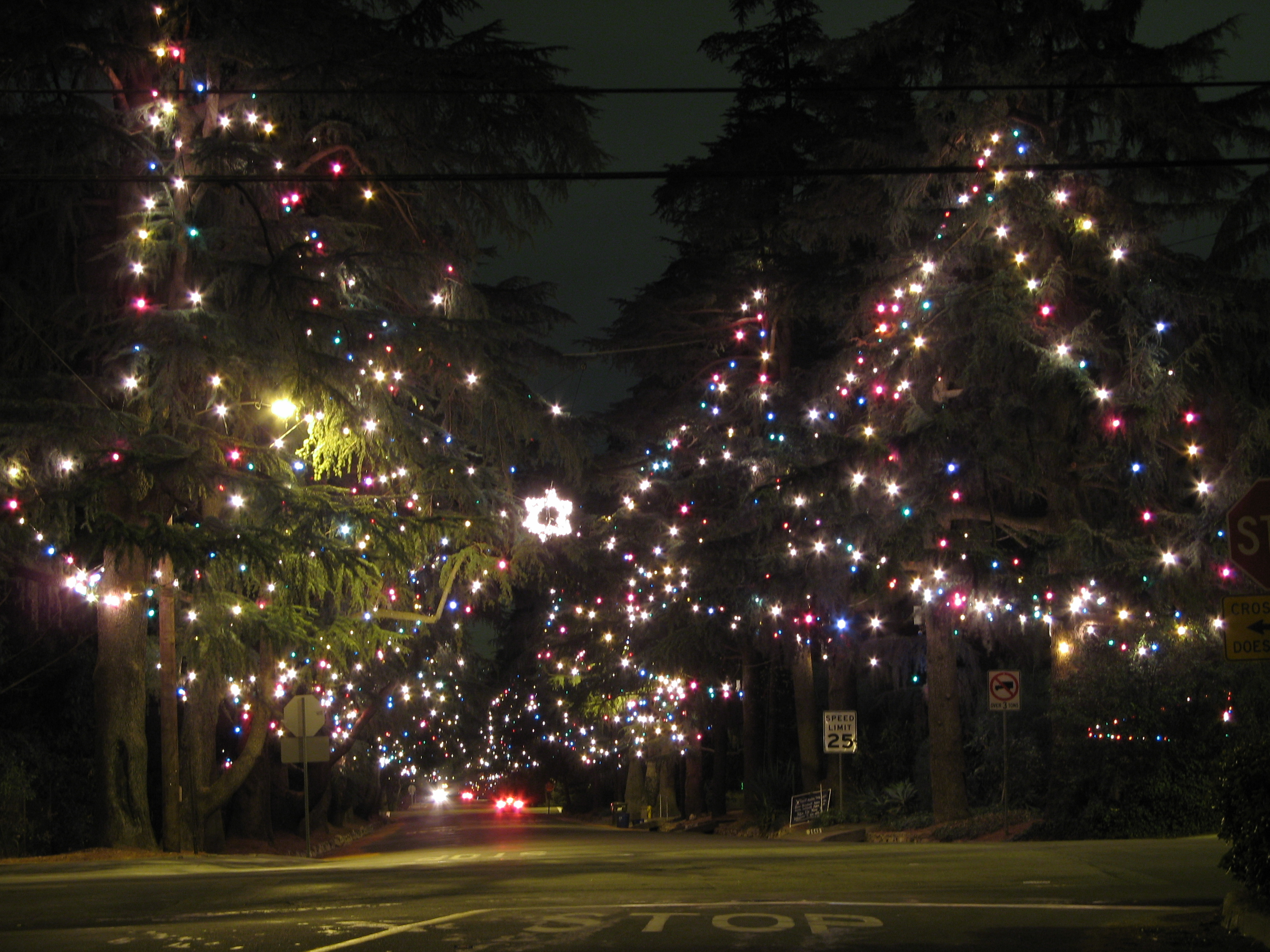
- Christmas Tree Lane, view looking south down Santa Rosa Avenue from Altadena Drive

- Location within the Los Angeles metropolitan area
- Location: Santa Rosa Ave. between Altadena Drive and Woodbury Road; Altadena, California
- Coordinates: 34°11′25″N 118°08′09″W
- Area: 9.6 acres (3.9 ha)
- Built: 1885
- NRHP reference No.: 90001444
- CHISL No.: 990
- Added to NRHP: September 13, 1990

Christmas Tree Lane is a 0.7-mile (1.1 km) boulevard of deodar cedar trees in Altadena, California. The trees on the Lane, Santa Rosa Avenue, have been lighted annually as a Christmas Holiday display since 1920. The association that runs it claims it is "the oldest large-scale outdoor Christmas display in the world". Christmas Tree Lane was listed on the U.S. National Register of Historic Places in 1990, the same year it was also designated as California Historical Landmark No. 990.

== History ==
=== Origin ===
Santa Rosa Avenue in Altadena is one of many north–south running streets named for female Spanish saints. Others are Santa Anita, Santa Clara (becomes El Molino Avenue), and Santa Marguerita (becomes Fair Oaks Avenue). At the head of Santa Rosa Avenue was a large parcel reserved for the mansion of Altadena founder John P. Woodbury. His brother, Frederick, had already established a home at the head of Santa Clara Avenue. Santa Rosa Avenue was to be the main approach to John's mansion from the Pasadena city limit. In 1883, returning from a trip to Italy, John described an impressive stand of deodars (Cedrus deodara, the Tree of God), indigenous to the Himalayas. John returned with a handful of seeds from the trees. Having consulted with an arborist friend of his at the Department of Agriculture, who assured him the trees should do well in Southern California, he had Frederick plant them in a nursery behind his house. In two years the young trees were transplanted to Santa Rosa Avenue, in all some 150 trees.

The work on Santa Rosa Avenue was carried out by Frederick's ranch foreman Tom Hoag. This included the employment of a large Chinese labor crew not only to perform the transplanting, but also to lay the river-rock-lined gutters which have become an important part of the lane's historical landscape.

Because of the ensuing land bust of 1888, John Woodbury's home was never realized. But the Santa Rosa deodars flourished in the decades to come.

=== The Pasadena-Altadena Uphill Race ===
From 1906 to 1909, Santa Rosa was a part of the Pasadena-Altadena Uphill Race, a sport of the new high-speed automobile. Entries consisted of some of the latest race cars of the period, including the Stutz Bearcat, and Barney Oldfield's Ford No. 999. The racers rallied on Los Robles Avenue south of Woodbury and raced up to the corner, making a hard right then a hard left up Santa Rosa. The dirt roads were rugged and in one instance a female rider was tossed from the car. From that point on ladies were prohibited from riding along. The competitions only ran for four years.

=== Lighting the Lane ===
In 1920, Altadena resident and Pasadena merchant Frederick Nash, president of the Pasadena chapter of Kiwanis, convinced his fellow Kiwanians and the City of Pasadena to light the Santa Rosa deodars, now 35 years planted, for the upcoming Christmas season. That year they succeeded in lighting one-fourth of the lane. Over the next few years as the lighting grew along the lane, the number of spectators increased with many arriving by automobile to motor their way between the illuminated rows. The lane was referred to as the Avenue of the Deodars.

In 1927 the Altadena chapter of Kiwanis formed, and annually they would take children from the local Boys and Girls Aid Society for rides along the Lane that they called "Christmas Tree Street."

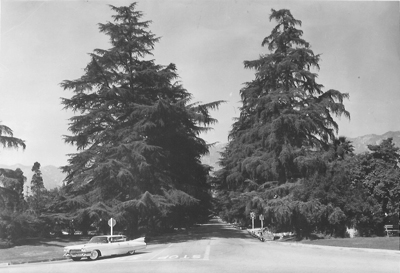
Intersection at Woodbury Road in 1959.

=== War years ===
The lane was fully lit each year up until 1943 and the "switch" was pulled annually by honoree Tom Hoag, the old foreman. In 1943 the lane went unlit, but not for the war effort. That year saw a light snow pack and water for power generation was predicted to be low, so the lane was left unlit for conservation purposes. In that time Tom Hoag died.

Over the years colorized postcards of the lane became popular. During the war and in the years following the lane was popularized by color photo postcards and the name "Christmas Tree Lane" began to appear on them. It is supposed that this is where the name became popularized.

== Christmas Tree Lane Association ==
During the first half of the 20th century, unincorporated Altadena had been solicited for annexation by Pasadena city. On a 1956 ballot, annexation was voted down. The City of Pasadena then withdrew its support for lighting Christmas Tree Lane. Altadenans were faced with having to attend to the Lane themselves. In 1957, they formed the Christmas Tree Lane Association with Lawrence Lamb as their first president. In coordination with the International Brotherhood of Electrical Workers Local No. 11, they set about electrifying and lighting Christmas Tree Lane from their own fund raising.

Traffic was managed with the assistance of local Boy Scout troops, who blocked the side streets, directing cars up Lake Avenue to Las Flores Street, well above the head of the Lane, and down Santa Rosa through the trees. This practice was ended in the mid-1970s with the increased auto traffic and new residents who were less than patient with the detouring.

The Association was predominantly a men's organization, given the type of work it took to physically light the Lane. In 1960 a Women's Auxiliary was formed, headed by Lenore Denny, to develop fund-raising projects during the year, such as summer picnics, rummage sales and donation cans placed on the sales counters of local businesses. Nowadays, fund-raising and manual labor are performed by men and women alike. By the late 1980s the board had not replanted several missing trees, and struggled to get the lights up every year. There were no reserve funds, and in fact the Association was in deficit. In 1994, younger board members were elected who raised funds to erase the deficit, plant new trees to fill the gaps, and build new lines for the trees. The Board is slowly replacing the old-style light bulbs that used 11 watts each with new LED bulbs that use 1 watt each and will have a longer life.

=== Southern California Edison ===
In 1964, Southern California Edison, which was already a benefactor of Christmas Tree Lane, mostly by providing free power, installed a permanent power grid along the Lane with throw-switch boxes at three intersections to handle the increased lighting through the now massive trees. Each year scores of volunteers would come out to string (and after the season unstring) the trees with electric lines full of dangling bulbs. The lines were fastened to ropes that led to pulleys located in the tops of the trees. The wiring was removed before spring to allow the trees new growth and to avoid being damaged during pruning.

Edison continued to provide free power until utilities deregulation in 2000.

== Landmark status ==
Over time age, root diseases and high winds began to take their toll on several of the trees. By 1990, 132 of the original 146 trees remained. That year, Christmas Tree Lane, with its remaining trees now over one hundred years old, was placed on the National Register of Historic Places and was nominated for California State Landmark status. The narrative impressed the state officials with a particular phenomenon: the Lane brought two relatively new products together in a single social activity, the electric light and the automobile. With that it was listed as California State Landmark No. 990.

The State marker at the intersection of Woodbury and Alameda St. in Altadena reads:

- NO. 990 CHRISTMAS TREE LANE - The 135 Deodar Cedar trees were planted in 1885 by the Woodbury Family, the founders of Altadena. First organized by F.C. Nash in 1920, the 'Mile of Christmas Trees' has been strung with 10,000 lights each holiday season through the efforts of volunteers and the Christmas Tree Lane Association. It is the oldest large-scale Christmas lighting spectacle in Southern California.

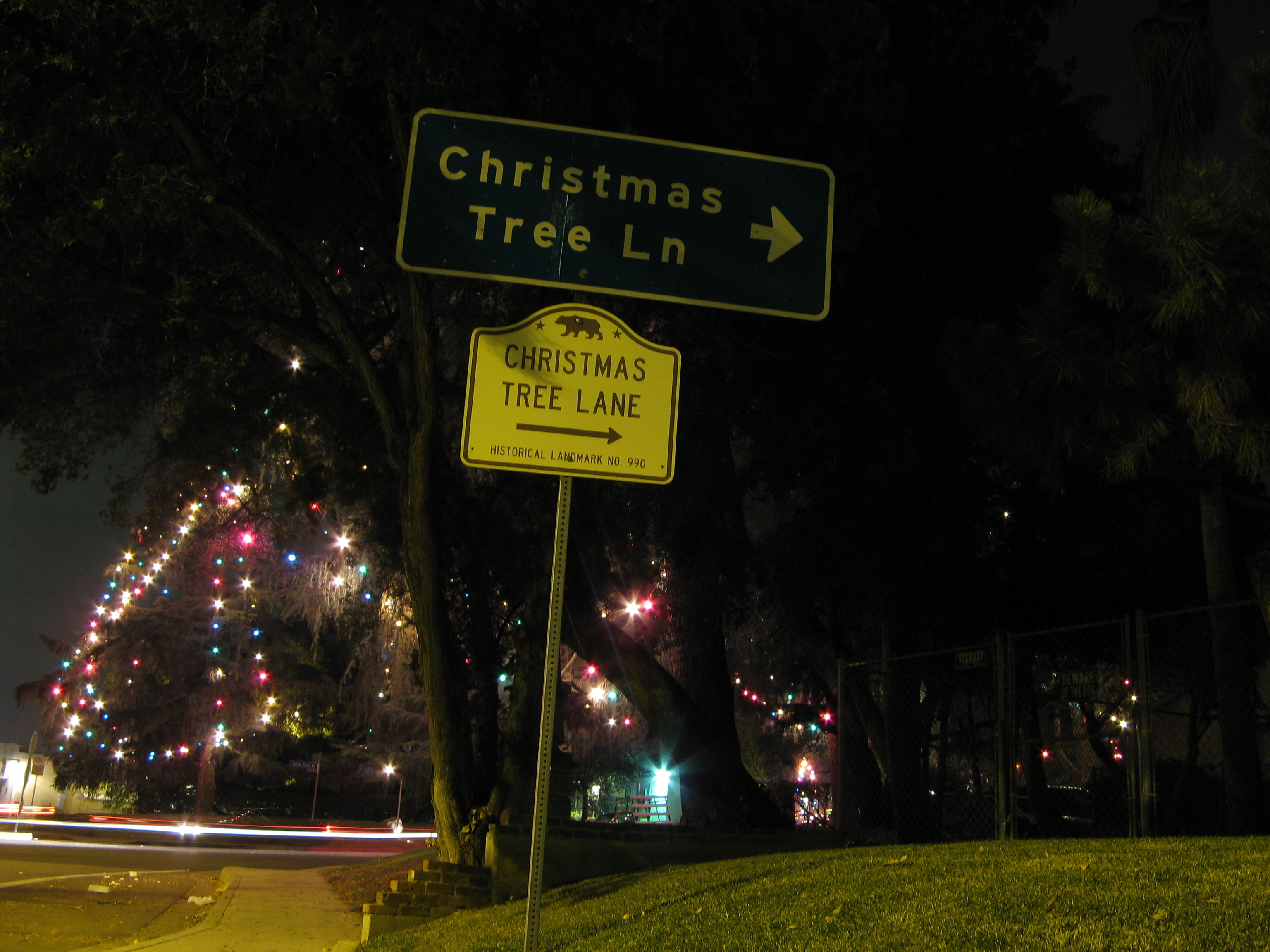
One of the several signs indicating Christmas Tree Lane as a California State Landmark.

== Threats to the Lane ==
In 2000, deregulation of the state's electrical utilities caused Southern California Edison to withdraw its maintenance of the Lane's electrical system and provision of free electricity. This meant that the grid would have to be metered and electricity would have to be billed. Thus the system would require permitting and have to meet all existing electrical codes. The Los Angeles County Public Works Department, which is responsible for meters and permits, deemed the old electrical system unsafe, and prohibitive cost estimates to rewire the grid threatened the Christmas Tree Lane tradition.

The Board of the Christmas Tree Lane Association appealed to the office of Los Angeles County Supervisor Michael D. Antonovich. The Department of Public Works assisted in designing a workable, safe and legitimate system. The installation cost of $130,000 was covered by Supervisor Antonovich, and the Lane was lighted that year on schedule.

=== 2025 Eaton Fire ===
In early January 2025, Christmas Tree Lane was one of the many landmarks threatened by the devastating Eaton Fire. One house on Christmas Tree Lane, and an electrical pole on the nearby Calaveras St were reported to have caught on fire.

On January 9, it was reported that the trees on Christmas Tree Lane had “narrowly dodged” the fires, being a sign of hope for local residents in a time of hardship for the city of Altadena. On January 15, the L.A. Times reported that the trees had escaped damage despite "a torrent" of embers coming down on the street's historic cedars and that despite broken branches, most "appear unscathed." The head of the Christmas Tree Lane Association, Scott Wardlaw, said "the trees didn't burn and it's not clear why." Cristhian Mace, a biologist for Los Angeles County Parks and Recreation said he thought the trees may have been spared because they were well irrigated and not dry and brittle, and that cedar bark is thick and somewhat fire resistant. Wardlaw said that if it's feasible, he'd like to see the lights turned on again before they come down in February 2025 “Just so we can say, ‘We’re still here.'” At least 13 of the more than 100 Christmas Tree Lane Association volunteers reportedly lost homes in the fire.
