= San Ramón, Chile =

City and Commune in Santiago Metropolitan Region of Chile

San Ramón
- City and Commune
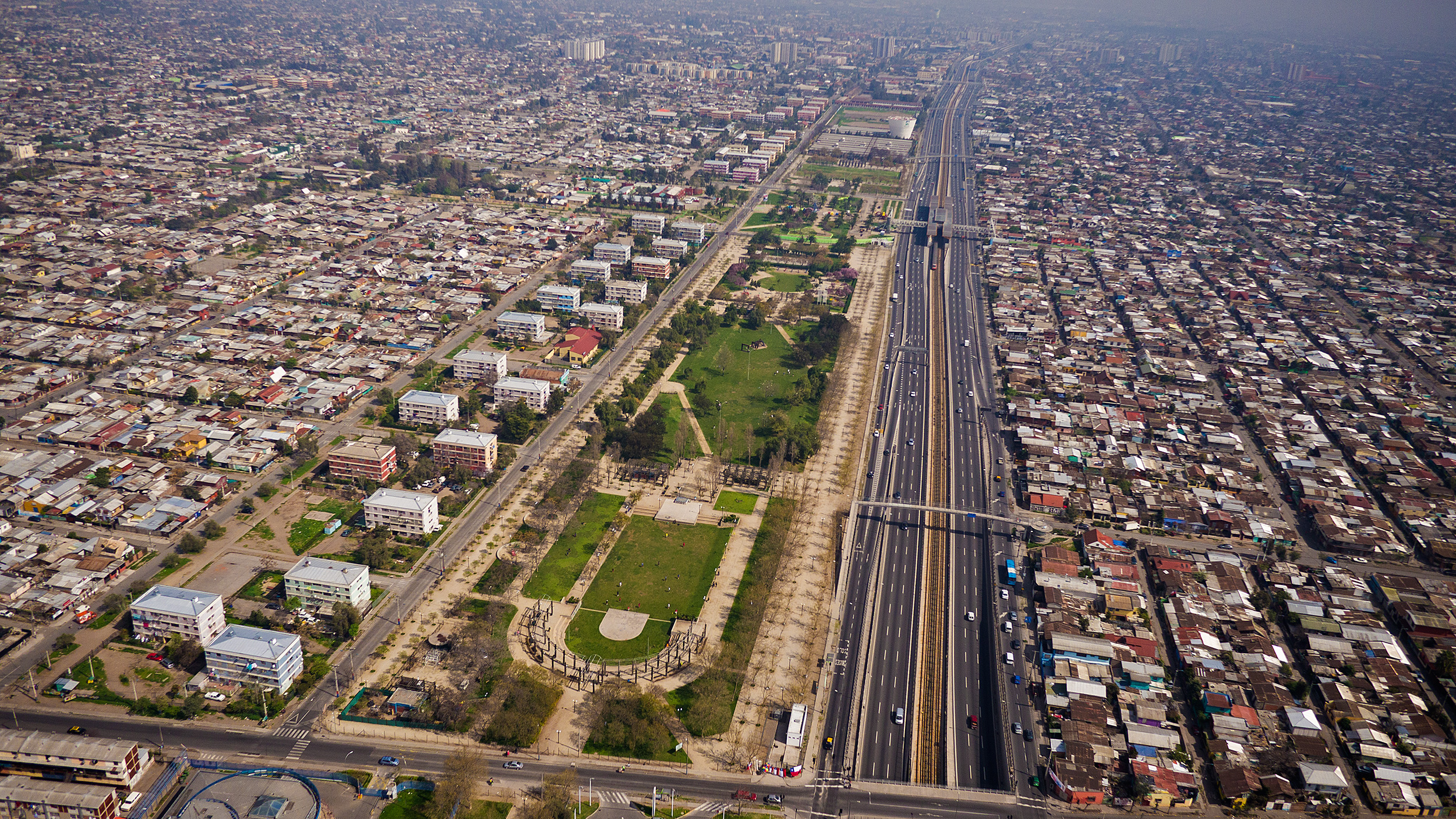
- Panoramic view of San Ramón

- Flag Coat of arms Map of San Ramón commune within Greater Santiago Location in Chile
- Coordinates (city): 33°32′S 70°38.5′W
- Country: Chile
- Region: Santiago
- Province: Santiago
- Established: 22 November 1984

Government
  - Type: Municipality
  - Alcalde: Gustavo Eduardo Toro Quintana (DC)

Area
  - Total: 6.5 km^{2} (2.5 sq mi)

Population (2024)
  - Total: 76,002
  - Rank: 76th in Chile
  - Density: 12,000/km^{2} (30,000/sq mi)
  - Urban: 76,002
  - Rural: 0
- Time zone: UTC-4 (CLT)
  - Summer (DST): UTC-3 (CLST)
- Area code: 56 +
- Website: Municipality of San Ramón

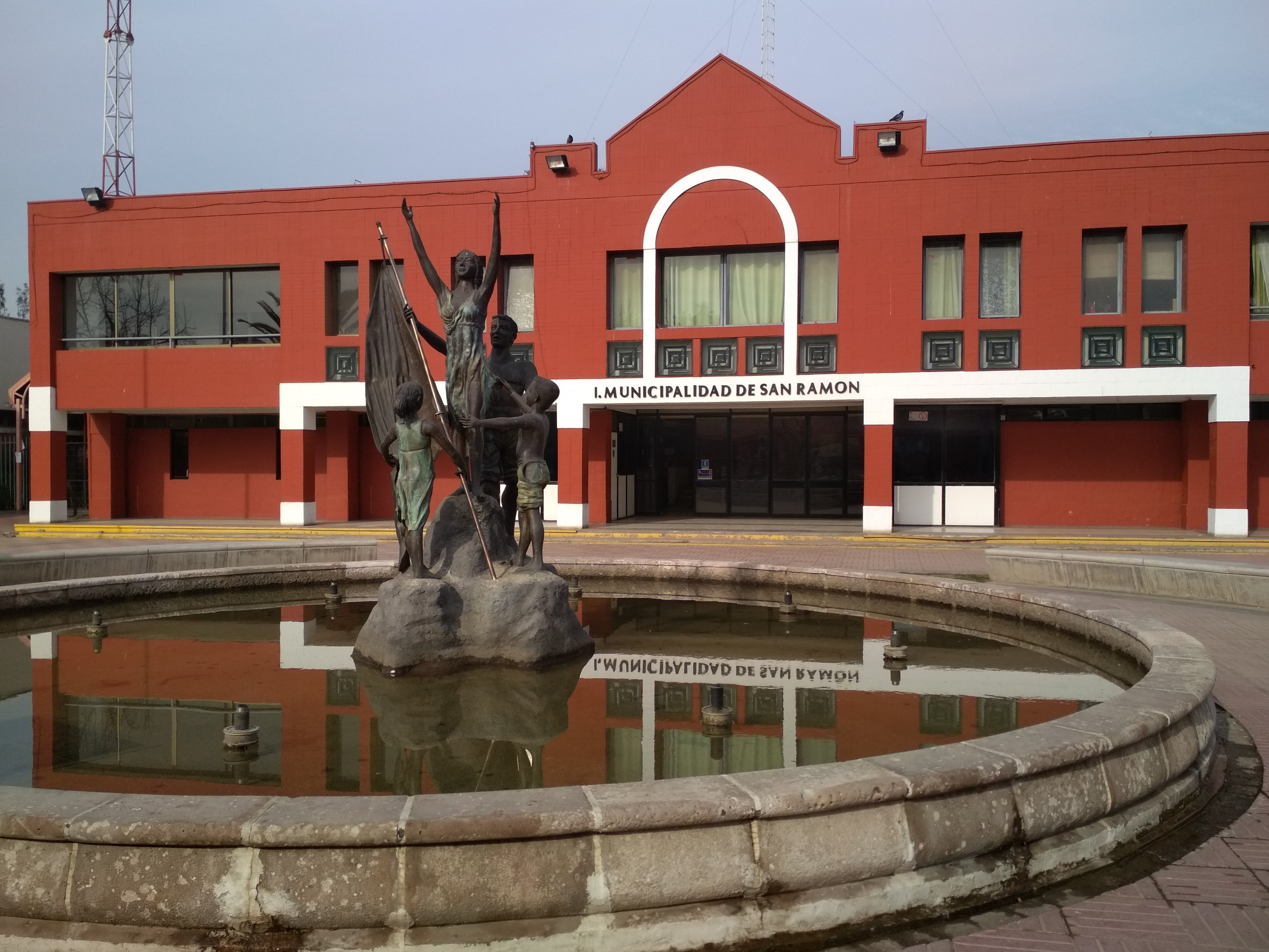
City Hall

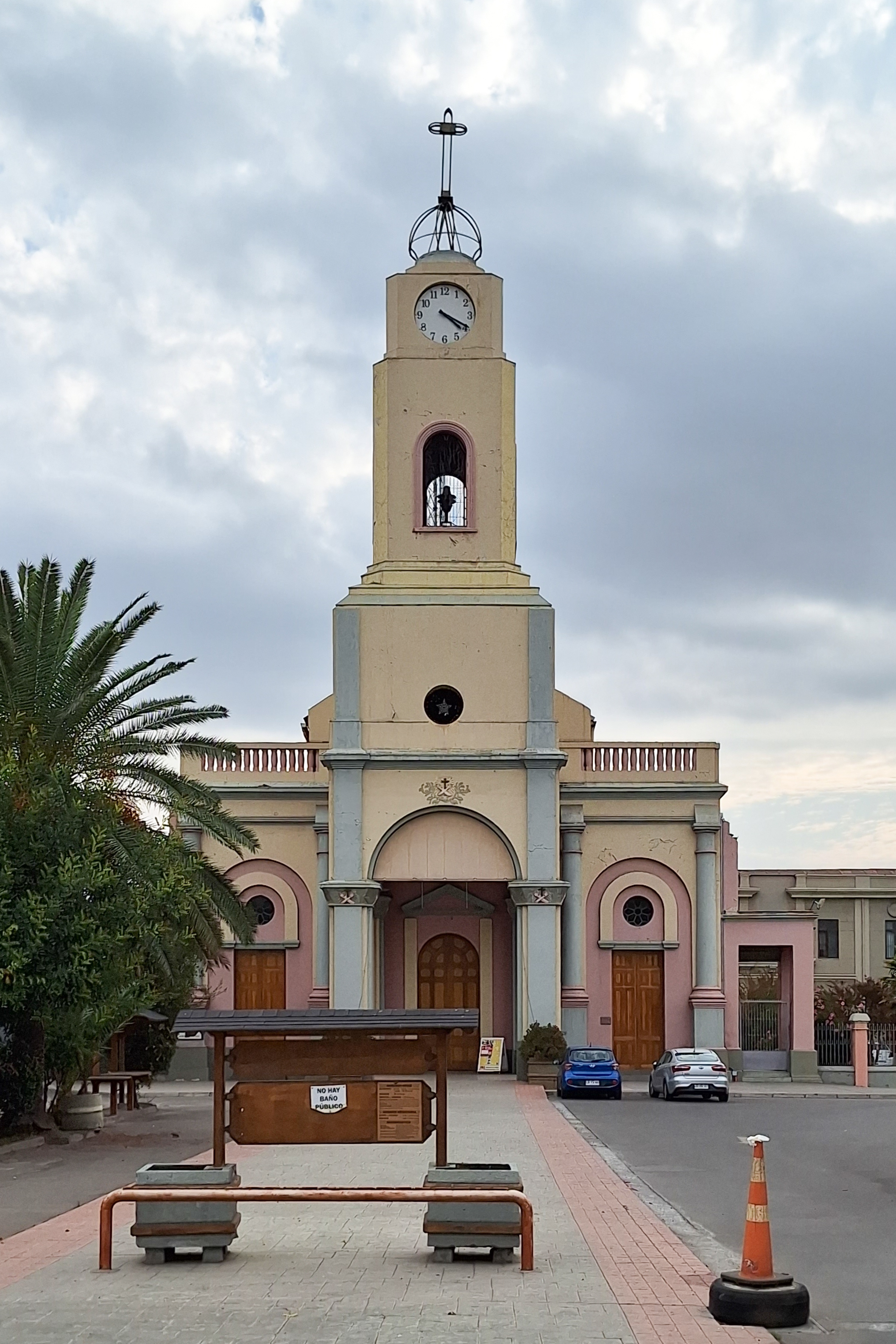
Santuario de la Inmaculada Concepción

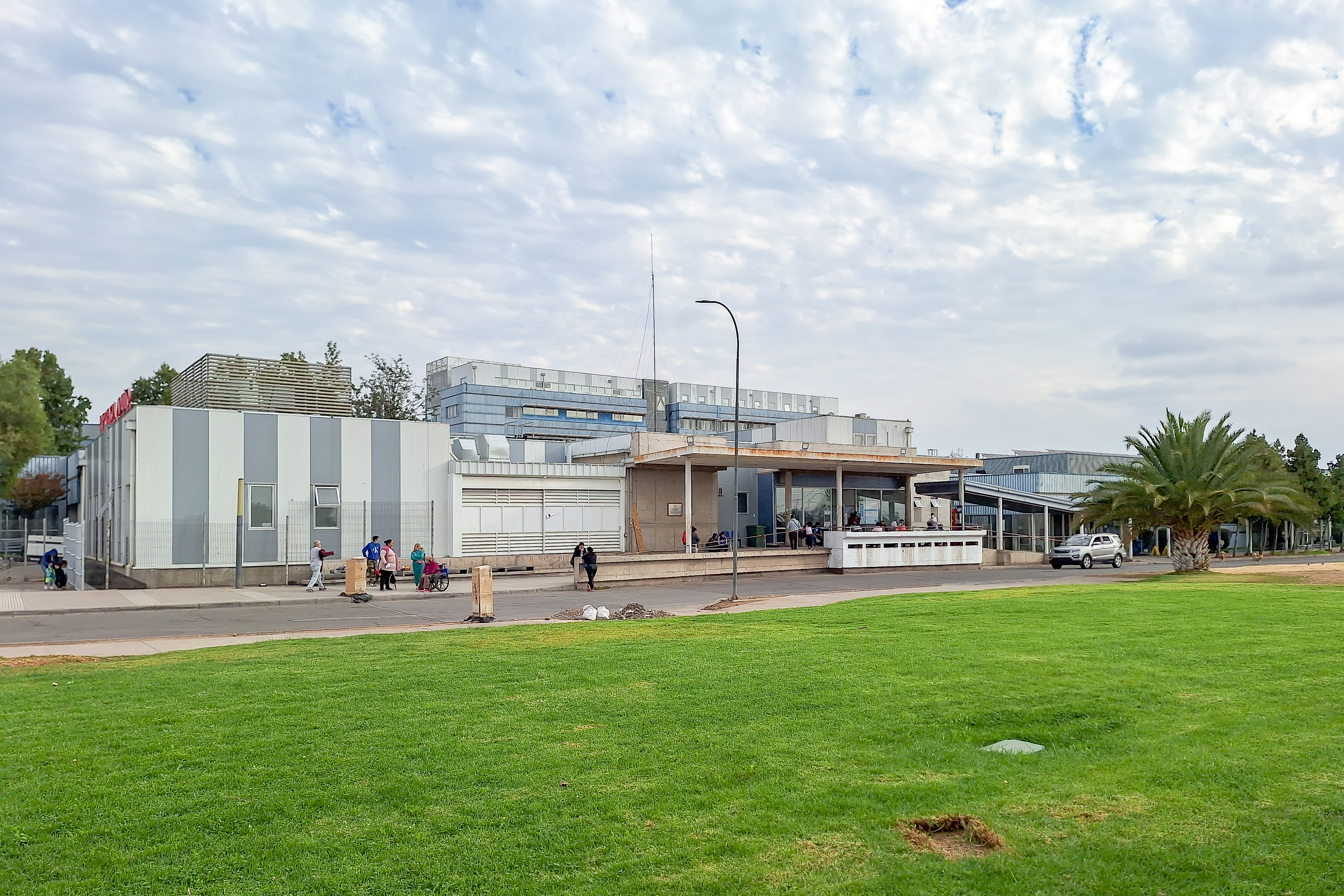
Padre Hurtado Hospital

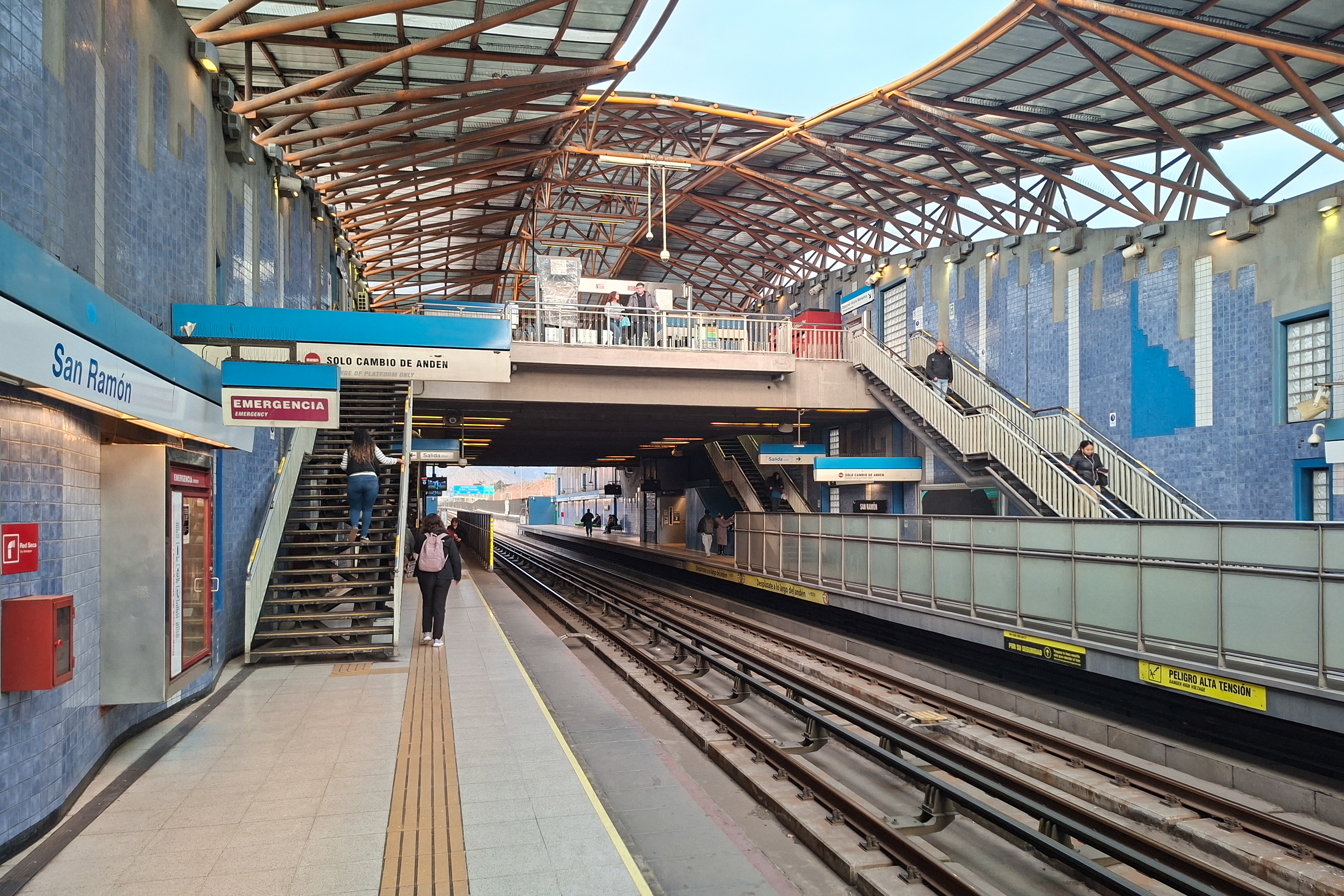
San Ramón metro station.

San Ramón (Spanish for "Saint Ramón") is a commune in the Santiago Province, within the Santiago Metropolitan Region of Chile. It is part of the urban area of Greater Santiago. It has 76,002 inhabitants.

== Demographics ==
As of the 2024 census, the commune has a population of 76,002, of which 49.2% are male and 50.8% are female. People under 15 years old make up 16.4% of the population, and people over 65 years old make up 16.8%. 100% of the population is urban.

Historical population
Year	Pop.	±% p.a.
1970	59,033	—
1982	99,410	+4.44%
1992	100,817	+0.14%
2002	94,906	−0.60%
2017	82,900	−0.90%
2024	76,002	−1.23%
Source: INE, Memoria Chilena

- Average annual household income: US$23,878 (PPP, 2006)
- Population below poverty line: 16.7% (2006)
- Regional quality of life index: 70.19, mid-low, 42 out of 52 (2005)
- Human Development Index: 0.679, 170 out of 341 (2003)

=== Immigration ===
As of the 2024 census, immigrants make up 8.2% of the population - 6.9% are from South America, 1.1% are from North America, 0.05% are from Europe, 0.06% are from Asia, 0.003% are from Africa, and 0.004% are from Oceania.

== Administration ==
As a commune, San Ramón is a third-level administrative division of Chile administered by a municipal council, headed by an alcalde who is directly elected every four years. The 2024-2028 alcalde is Gustavo Eduardo Toro Quintana (DC). The communal council has the following members:

- Cristóbal Escobar Salinas (RN)
- Mario Alarcón León (REP)
- Maricel Araya Peñaloza (Ind/DC)
- Fidel Contreras Cespedes (PPD)
- Claudio Tapia Díaz (PAVP)
- Fidel Castro Solís (PH)
- Estefany Ñanculef Beltrán (Ind/FA)
- Jacqueline Sandoval Rozas (PC)

Within the electoral divisions of Chile, San Ramón is represented in the Chamber of Deputies by Mr. Tucapel Jiménez (PPD) and Mr. Iván Moreira (UDI) as part of the 27th electoral district, (together with El Bosque and La Cisterna). The commune is represented in the Senate by Soledad Alvear Valenzuela (PDC) and Pablo Longueira Montes (UDI) as part of the 8th senatorial constituency (Santiago-East).
