= Américo Vespucio Avenue =

Ring road in Santiago, Chile

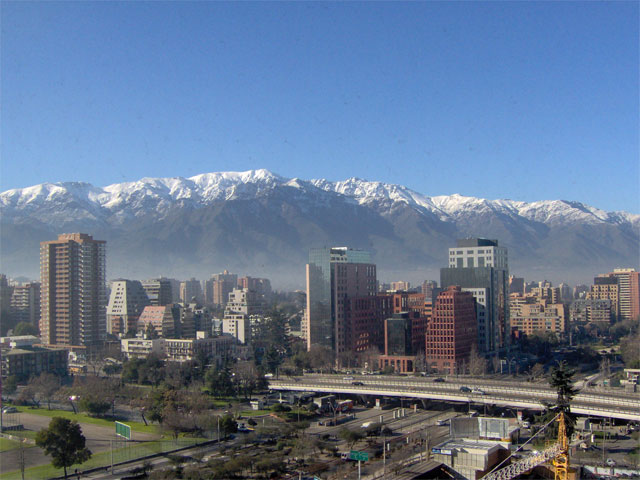
Apoquindo Avenue overpass on Américo Vespucio

Américo Vespucio Avenue is a 64.8-kilometre (40.3 mi) ring road in Santiago, Chile, named after Renaissance cartographer Amerigo Vespucci. Two adjacent sections of the avenue are occupied by Vespucio Norte Express and Vespucio Sur free-flow tolling highways, which are under concession. Vespucio Avenue meets the two largest roundabouts in Santiago, namely Quilín and Grecia, which have circumferences of 793 m and 535 m respectively.

== Santiago Metro ==
Escuela Militar metro station is located at the junction of Vespucio and Apoquindo Avenue. The terminus stations of Line 2, which are Vespucio Norte and La Cisterna, are located by the avenue. An underground portion of Line 4 of the Santiago Metro runs under Américo Vespucio Avenue, which includes Príncipe de Gales, Simón Bolívar, Plaza Egaña, Los Orientales and Grecia stations. Part of Line 4 and all of Line 4a run along the central reservation of Vespucio Sur. In the first case, the stops are Los Presidentes, Quilín, Las Torres, Macul and Vicuña Mackenna stations, and in the second, the stops are La Cisterna, San Ramón, Santa Rosa, La Granja, Santa Julia and Vicuña Mackenna stations.

== History ==
A cloverleaf interchange at the intersection of Vespucio and Route 68 was completed in 1977.

== Bibliography ==
- Parrochia, Juan (1979). Santiago en el tercer cuarto del S.XX : el transporte metropolitano en Chile, realizaciones de metro y vialidad urbana (in Spanish). Universidad de Chile.
