= La Cisterna =

- Commune
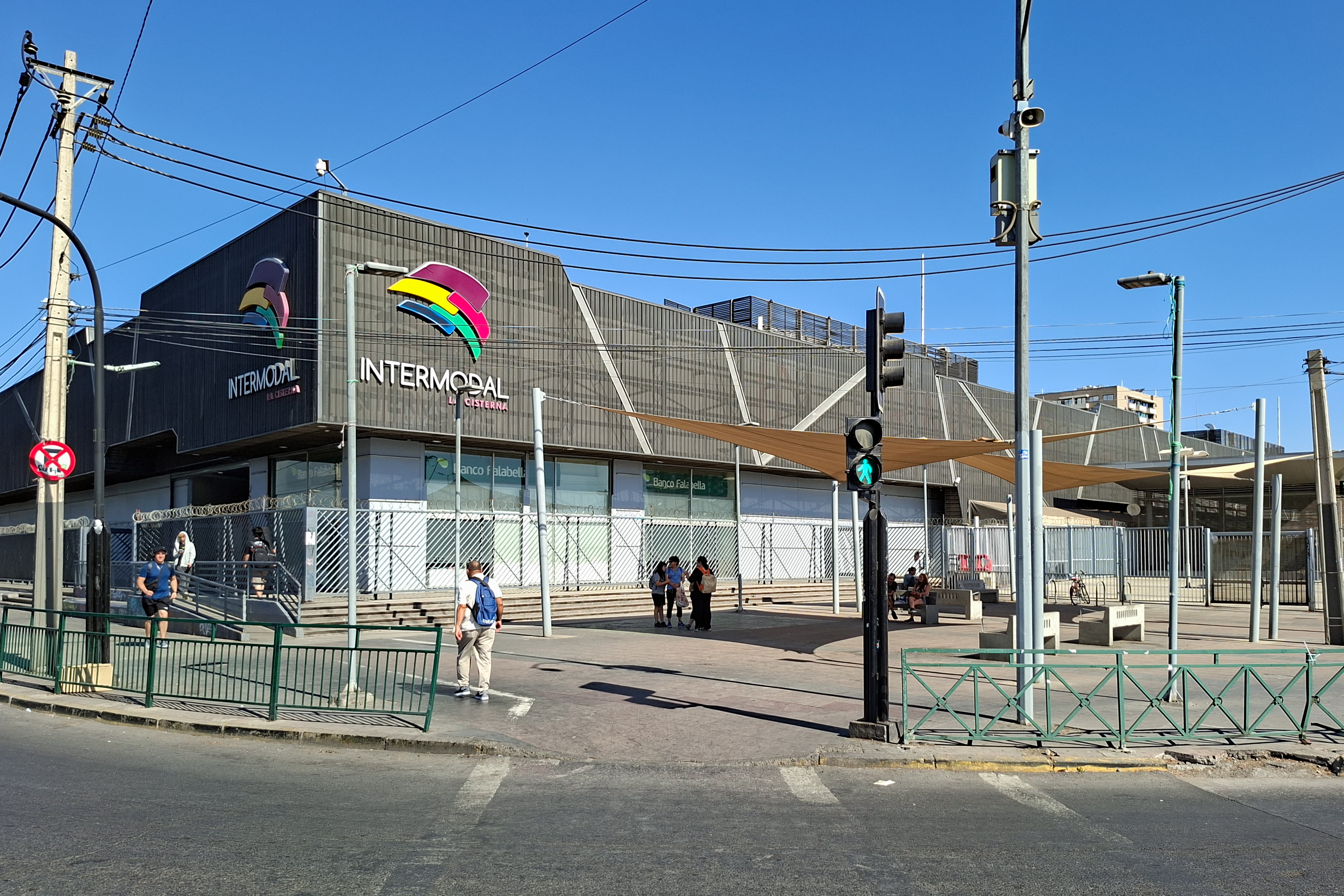
- Intermodal Station La Cisterna

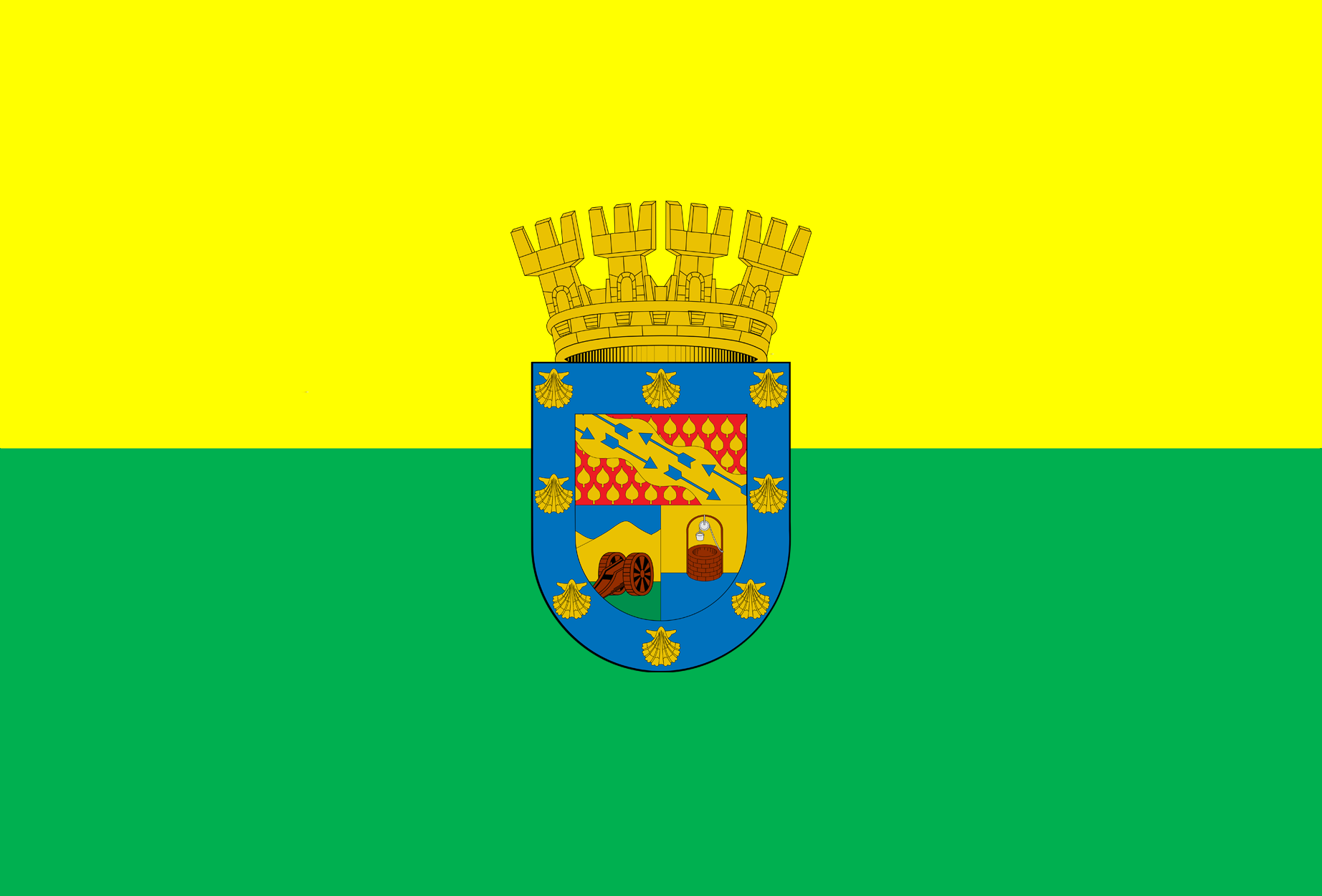
- Flag Coat of arms Map of La Cisterna within Greater Santiago Location in Chile
- Coordinates (city): 33°32′06″S 70°39′51″W
- Country: Chile
- Region: Santiago
- Province: Santiago
- Founded: 30 May 1925

Government
  - Type: Municipality
  - Alcalde: Joel Olmos Espinoza (Ind.)

Area
  - Total: 10.0 km^{2} (3.9 sq mi)

Population (2024)
  - Total: 103,157
  - Density: 10,300/km^{2} (26,700/sq mi)
  - Urban: 103,157
  - Rural: 0
- Time zone: UTC-4 (CLT)
  - Summer (DST): UTC-3 (CLST)
- Area code: 56 +
- Website: Municipality of La Cisterna

La Cisterna (Spanish pronunciation: [la sisˈteɾna], Spanish for "the cistern") is a commune in Santiago Province in the Santiago Metropolitan Region in Chile. Founded on 30 May 1925, it is part of the urban area of Greater Santiago. It has 103,157 inhabitants.

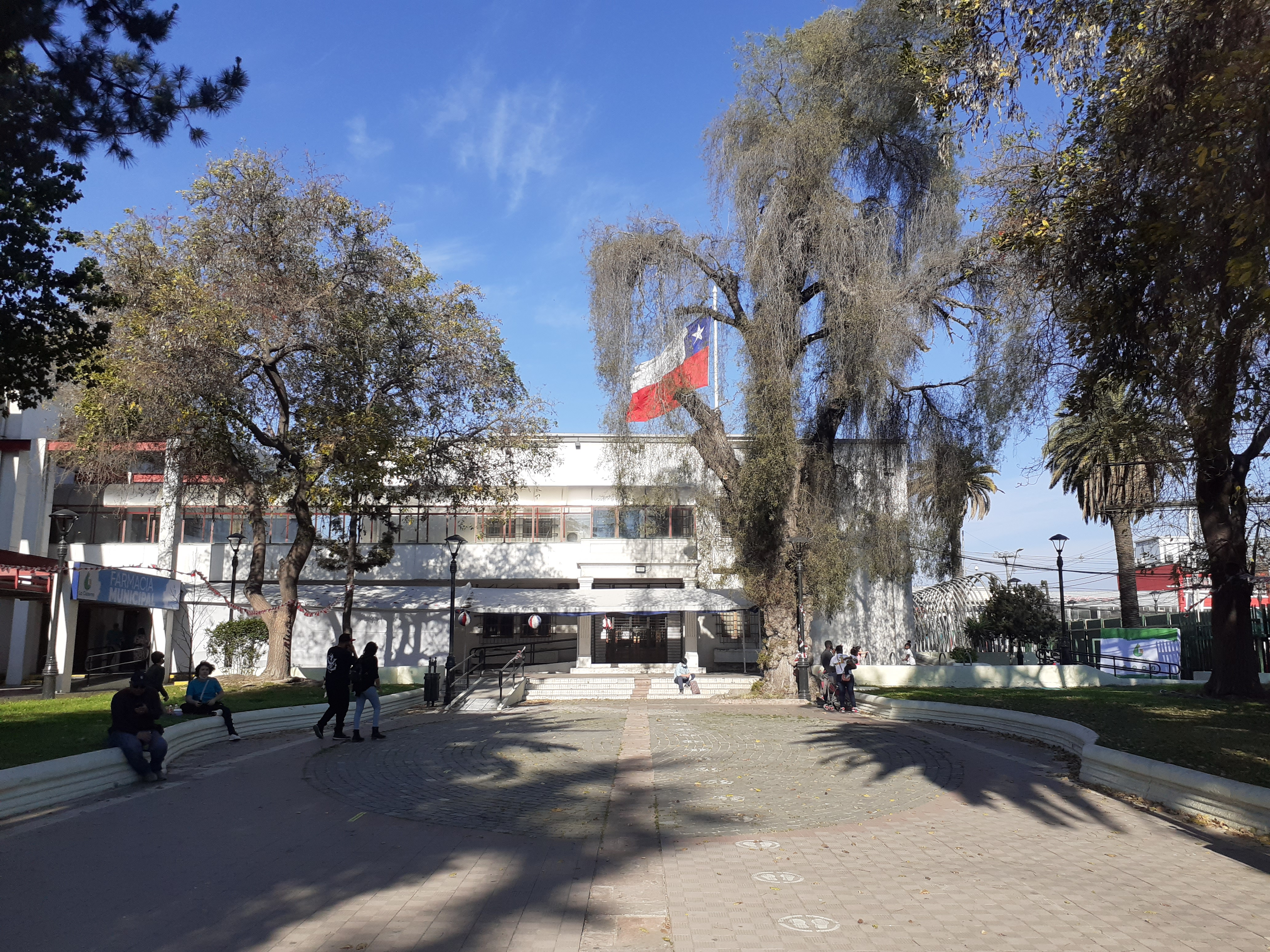
City Hall

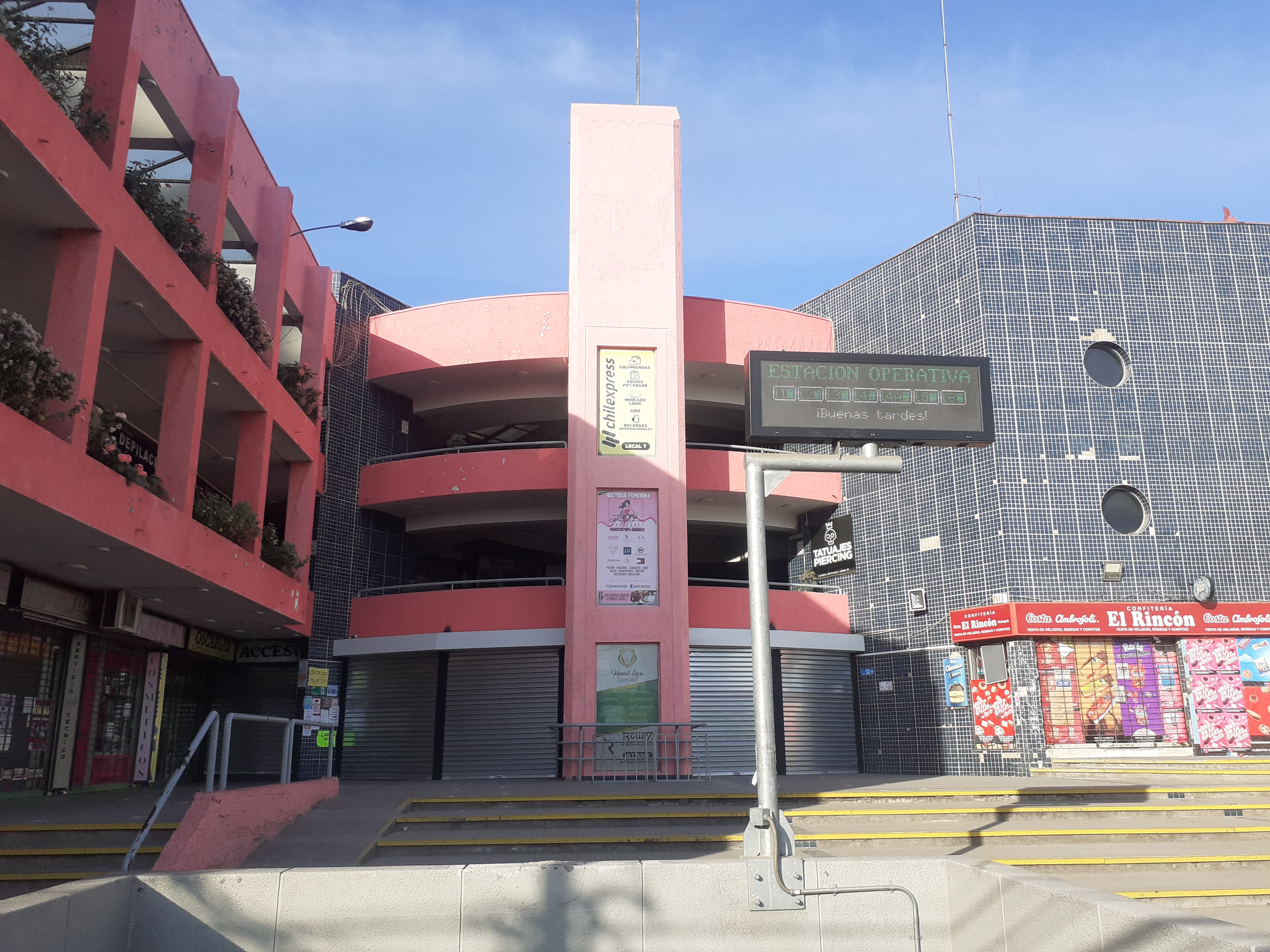
Caracol Comercial Lo Ovalle

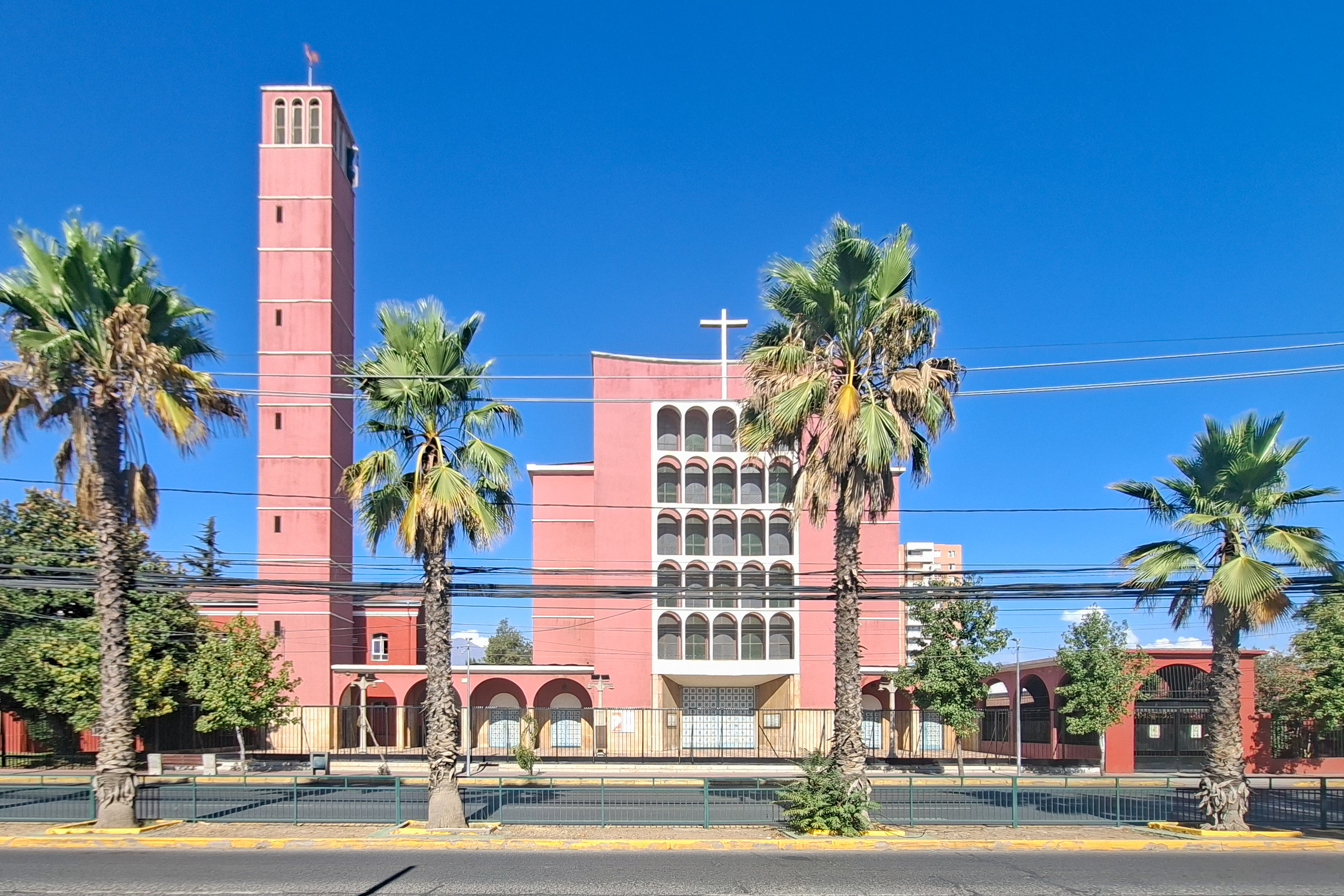
Nacional Temple San Juan Bosco

== Demographics ==
As of the 2024 census, the population is 103,157, of which 47.6% are male and 52.4% are female. People under 15 years old make up 16.6% of the population, and people over 65 years old make up 14.3%. 100% of the population is urban.

Historical population
Year	Pop.	±% p.a.
1970	80,512	—
1982	95,863	+1.46%
1992	94,712	−0.12%
2002	85,118	−1.06%
2017	90,119	+0.38%
2024	103,157	+1.95%
Source: INE, Memoria Chilena

- Average annual household income: US$38,305 (PPP, 2006)
- Population below poverty line: 8.6% (2006)
- Regional quality of life index: 81.78, high, 8 out of 52 (2005)
- Human Development Index: 0.775, 24 out of 341 (2003)

=== Immigration ===
As of the 2024 census, immigrants make up 19.2% of the population - 18.1% are from South America, 0.8% from North America, 0.1% from Europe, 0.1% from Asia, 0.01% from Africa, and 0.01% from Oceania.

== Administration ==
As a commune, La Cisterna is a third-level administrative division of Chile administered by a municipal council, headed by an alcalde who is directly elected every four years. The 2024-2028 alcalde is Joel Olmos Espinoza (Ind). The communal council has the following members:

- Gonzalo Aguayo Gajardo (RN)
- Maritza Salas Vega (Ind/RN)
- Cesar Antillanca Urrutia (REP)
- Alejandro Urrutia Jorquera (PR)
- Orlando Morales Becerra (PPD)
- Iván Borcoski González (PS)
- Mónica Quezada González (PC)
- Carola Espíndola Castro (FA)

Within the electoral divisions of Chile, La Cisterna is represented in the Chamber of Deputies by Tucapel Jiménez (PPD) and Iván Moreira (UDI) as part of the 27th electoral district, (together with El Bosque and San Ramón). The commune is represented in the Senate by Soledad Alvear (PDC) and Pablo Longueira (UDI) as part of the 8th senatorial constituency (Santiago-East).

== See also ==
- List of mayors of La Cisterna
