= La Cisterna metro station =

Santiago metro station

La Cisterna
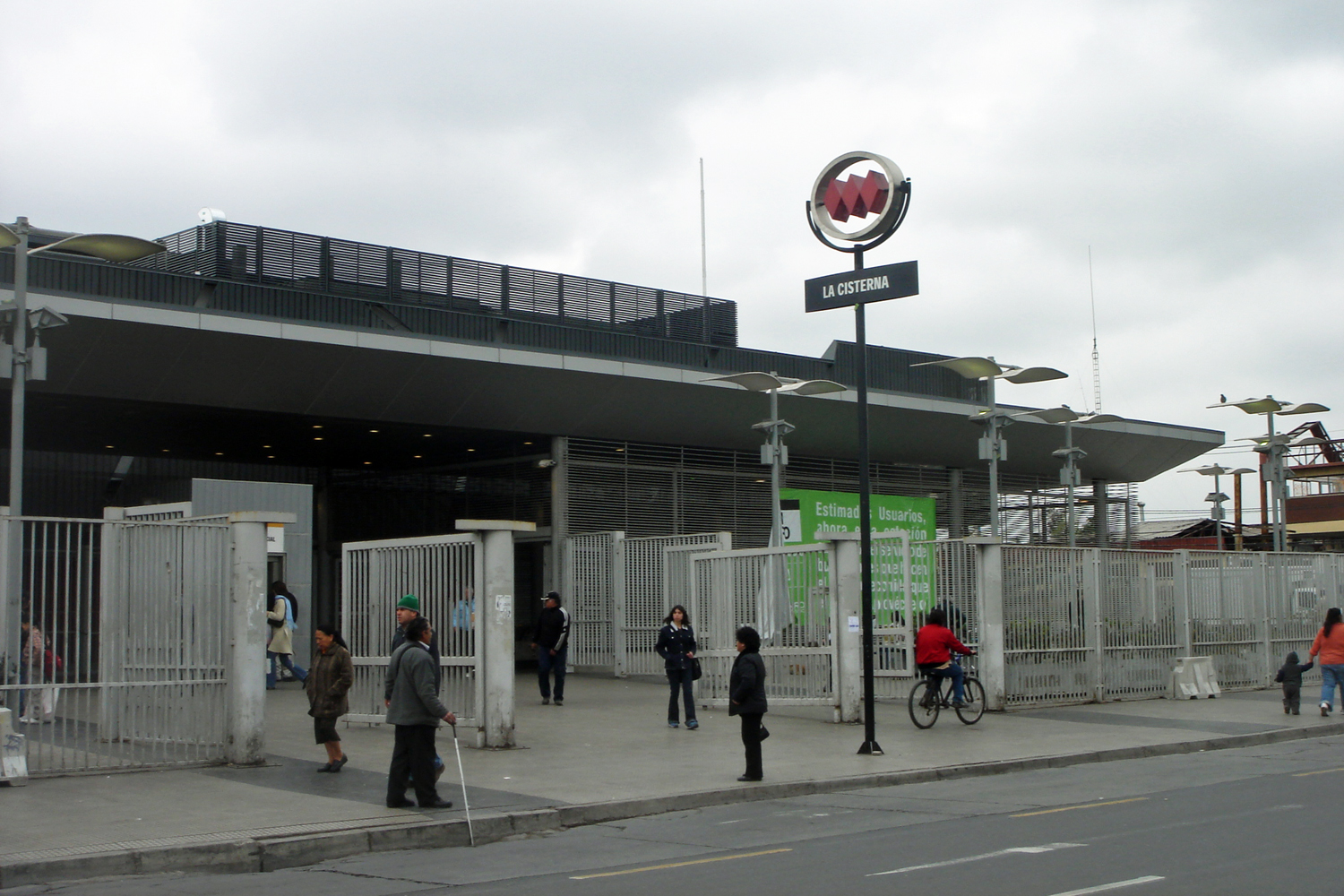
- Main entrance

General information
- Location: Vespucio Sur Freeway / Gran Avenida José Miguel Carrera
- Coordinates: 33°32′14.56″S 70°39′51.83″W
- System: Santiago rapid transit
- Lines: Line 2 Line 4A
- Platforms: 2 side platforms for each line
- Tracks: 2 per line
- Connections: Transantiago buses

Construction
- Accessible: yes

History
- Opened: 22 December 2004; 16 August 2006

Services
Preceding station	Santiago Metro	Following station
El Parrón towards Vespucio Norte	Line 2	El Bosque towards Hospital El Pino
Terminus	Line 4A	San Ramón towards Vicuña Mackenna
Location

La Cisterna is a station on the Santiago Metro in Santiago, Chile. It is an interchange between lines 2 and 4A, and consists of two parts, one built in an open trench and the other partially excavated, joined by pedestrian tunnels. The Line 2 platforms opened on 22 December 2004 as part of a 2.2 km (1.4 mi) southward extension of Line 2 from Lo Ovalle metro station. The Line 4A platforms opened on 16 August 2006 as part of the inaugural section of the line between Vicuña Mackenna and La Cisterna. It is named after La Cisterna, the district where the station is located and whose town hall is close to it.

The station on Line 4A is part of an embanked section at the middle of Vespucio Sur Freeway and is spanned by a bridge carrying Gran Avenida, whose central deck forms the roof of the mezzanine of the station.

The side platforms and tracks of the underground station are built within an excavated 140 m (460 ft)-long tunnel, which is traversed by three tunnels containing a bridge over platforms each. The northernmost and the southernmost tunnels link entrances to the west with a large cut-and-cover box structure to the east, which includes the ticket hall and is adjacent to the Gabriela Mistral intermodal station.

Pedestrian tunnels, which contain escalators and stairs, connect the mezzanine level of the station on Line 4A to the northernmost portion of the open cut volume and the northernmost access tunnel that perpendicularly intersects the tunnel where Line 2 runs. The southern mouths of the tunnels joining both stations open at the same level as the bridges over the platforms of the excavated station.
