= Vicuña Mackenna metro station =

Santiago metro station

Vicuña Mackenna
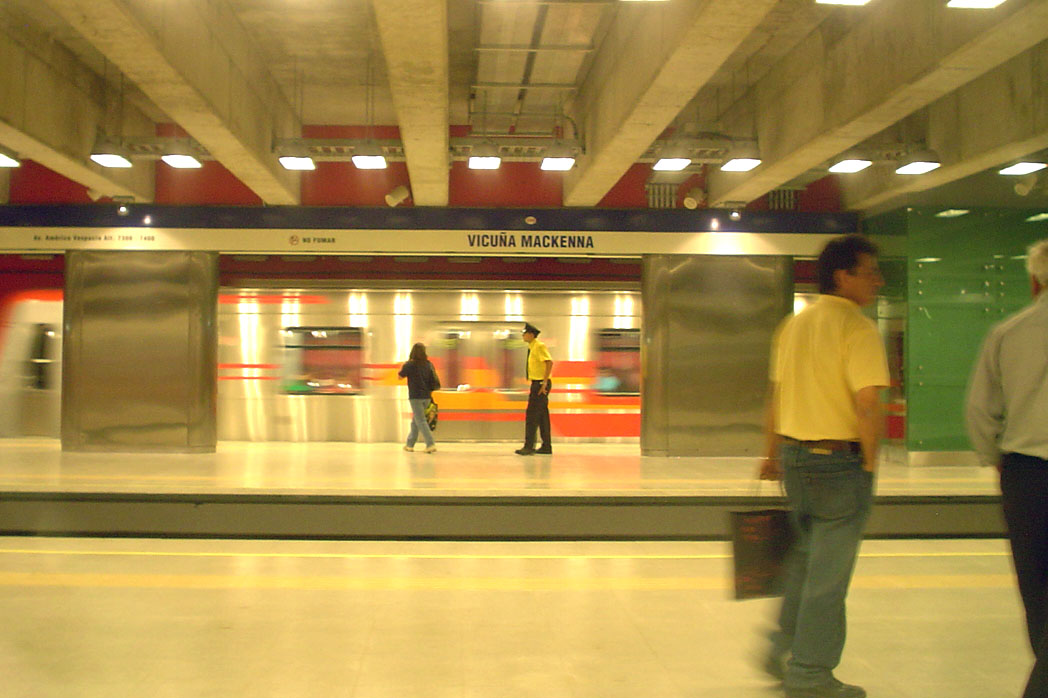
- Line 4 platforms

General information
- Location: Vespucio Sur Freeway / Julio Vildósola Street
- Coordinates: 33°31′10.83″S 70°35′46.20″W
- System: Santiago rapid transit
- Lines: Line 4 Line 4A
- Platforms: 2 island platforms (Line 4); 2 side platforms (Line 4A)
- Tracks: 2 per line
- Connections: Transantiago buses

Construction
- Accessible: yes

History
- Opened: March 2, 2006; August 16, 2006

Services
Preceding station	Santiago Metro	Following station
Macul towards Tobalaba	Line 4	Vicente Valdés towards Plaza de Puente Alto
Santa Julia towards La Cisterna	Line 4A	Terminus
Location

Vicuña Mackenna is a station on the Santiago Metro in Santiago, Chile. It is a transfer station between the Line 4 and the Line 4A and is the eastern terminus of the Line 4A. The Line 4 station was opened on 2 March 2006 as part of the connection between Grecia and Vicente Valdés. The Line 4A station was opened on 16 August 2006 as part of the inaugural section of the line between Vicuña Mackenna and La Cisterna.

The station is composed of a street-level Mezzanine, an embanked level, which is located along Vespucio Sur Freeway, and an underground level. The lower level was originally designed to serve both lines as a kind of branch for the would-be Line 4A, but it currently only serves Line 4. The embankment has a noticeable temporary platform that overlaps one of the original tracks, which has not been removed in 18 years.
