= History of rail transport in Chile =

This article is part of the history of rail transport by country series

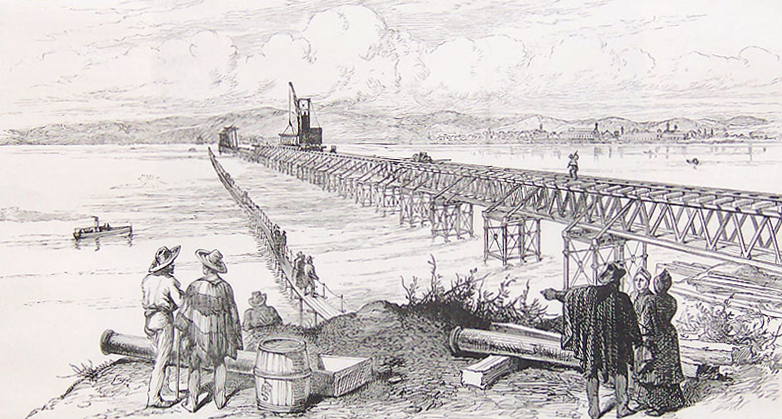
The Biobío Railroad Bridge under construction. Credit: The Illustrated London News (24 August 1889).

Chile rail map of 1930

The history of rail transport in Chile has gone through several periods of boom and bust. It began in 1840, with the construction by William Wheelwright of the first branch in the north (from Copiapo Caldera; see below). Further construction proceeded apace linking cities from Pisagua all the way to Puerto Montt.

In addition, there was a network on the big island of Chiloe, and a host of now completely abandoned branches.

Four cross border lines were also built:

- Arica to La Paz in Bolivia,
- another from Antofagasta to La Paz (currently operated only to Cochabamba),
- Antofagasta to Salta (Argentina)
- Valparaíso to Buenos Aires.

The majority of rail infrastructure in Chile was constructed by private enterprise for freight transport, particularly for mining and to some extent forestry. The state did construct and operate some railways, first as FFCC del Estado (in English, 'State Railways'), renamed in 1994 Empresa de los Ferrocarriles del Estado or EFE (in English, 'State Railway Company'). The rail networks in the North and South were essentially separate; in the North used 1,000 mm (3 ft 3 3/8 in) metre gauge, while the South used 5 ft 6 in (1,676 mm) Indian gauge.

At its peak in 1913, the national rail system had 7,658 km (4,758 mi) of track. It carried about 21 million passengers in 1946 and about 27 million in 1973.

Starting in the 1950s, passenger and freight transport service started to decline due to lack of investment in infrastructure and rolling stock. In 1978, all state funds were cut off to EFE leading to a major crisis. Since the 1990s, with the return of democracy as well as the increase in population density, the need and commitment to create interurban public transport systems at the national level has re-emerged, beginning a financing process for track renovation and the purchase of new rolling stock (such as the Biotrén, Valparaíso Metro or Metrotren Nos), as well as tourist and preservation services. As of 2014, Chile had about 5,500 kilometers (3,400 mi) of operational track, of which 2,200 km (1,400 mi) was managed by the state.

The resurgence of renewable energy in Chile is causing the authorities to consider the possibility of restoring suspended train lines and the creation of new electrified rail projects, public and private.

== Northern Network ==
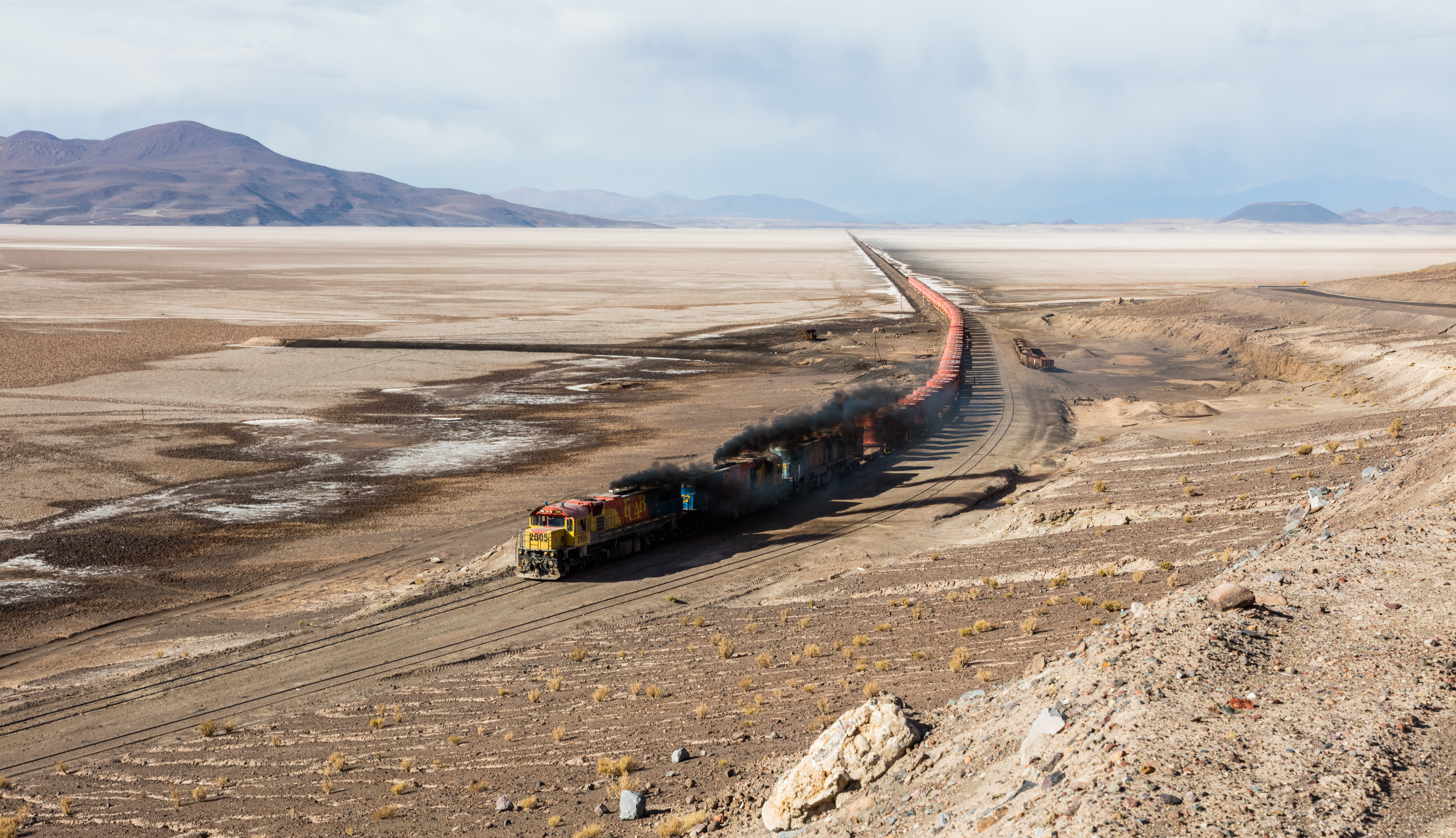
FCAB railroad crossing the Carcote salar, northern Chile

La Red Norte (in english, 'Northern Network') ran from the extreme north of Chile, where the Arica–La Paz railway is located, to La Calera in the Valparaíso Province. Its tracks were 1,000 mm (3 ft 3 3/8 in) metre gauge. However, several sections had originally 1,435 mm (4 ft 8 1/2 in) standard gauge including the first Chilean railroad from Caldera to Copiapó (see below) and the railroad from Coquimbo to Ovalle.

The North Network ceased to functions on 16 June 1975, after mounting financial losses. This led to the decline of operating branch lines, with some sections of the railway being sold to other companies, some of which maintain cargo services between different locations, such as the Romeral Railway which operates an iron ore line from Romeral mine to the port of Guayacán, and owns the old section of the Northern Longitudinal Railway between La Serena and Coquimbo.

=== The Trans-Andean Railroad ===
The Trasandino Los Andes – Mendoza Railway linked the Chilean city of Los Andes with the city of Mendoza in Argentina. Its route began in the Chilean city and went up through the Aconcagua River to Las Cuevas, where there was a tunnel that crossed into Argentina. Then, it continued along the Las Cuevas and Mendoza rivers until reaching the city of the same name.

The Trasandino Railroad was inaugurated on 5 April 1910 and ended its operations in 1984. It was laid to 1,000 mm (3 ft 3 3/8 in) metre gauge and partially equipped with Abt rack. Much of the infrastructure (bridges and tracks) is still visible.

=== Arica–La Paz railway ===
The railway line that connects the cities of Arica and La Paz was built between 1906 and 1913 and was inaugurated on 13 May 1913 . It was entirely administered by Chile until 1928, when Bolivia began to administer the section that runs through its territory. Today the Chilean section is a freight line operated by FCALP.

=== Antofagasta – La Paz railway ===
The Ferrocarril de Antofagasta a La Paz was a 1,000 mm (3 ft 3 3/8 in) metre gauge railway line established at the end of the 19th century as "Antofagasta (Chili) and Bolivia Railway Company".

Until the mid-1970s, the line provided cargo and passenger transport services between the towns of Antofagasta, Ollagüe and La Paz. Currently, the company "Ferrocarril de Antofagasta a Bolivia" (FCAB) uses the railways to transport cargo to and from Bolivia, and also connects its line with the Andean Railway of Bolivia, Ferronor in Chile, and Ferrocarril Belgrano in Argentina.

=== Mineral lines ===
There were also private industrial lines such as the Anglo-Chilian Nitrate and Railway Company's Tocopilla nitrate railway which hauled nitrate for decades until 2015 when flood damage put it beyond economic repair.

=== The first railway: from Caldera to Copiapó ===
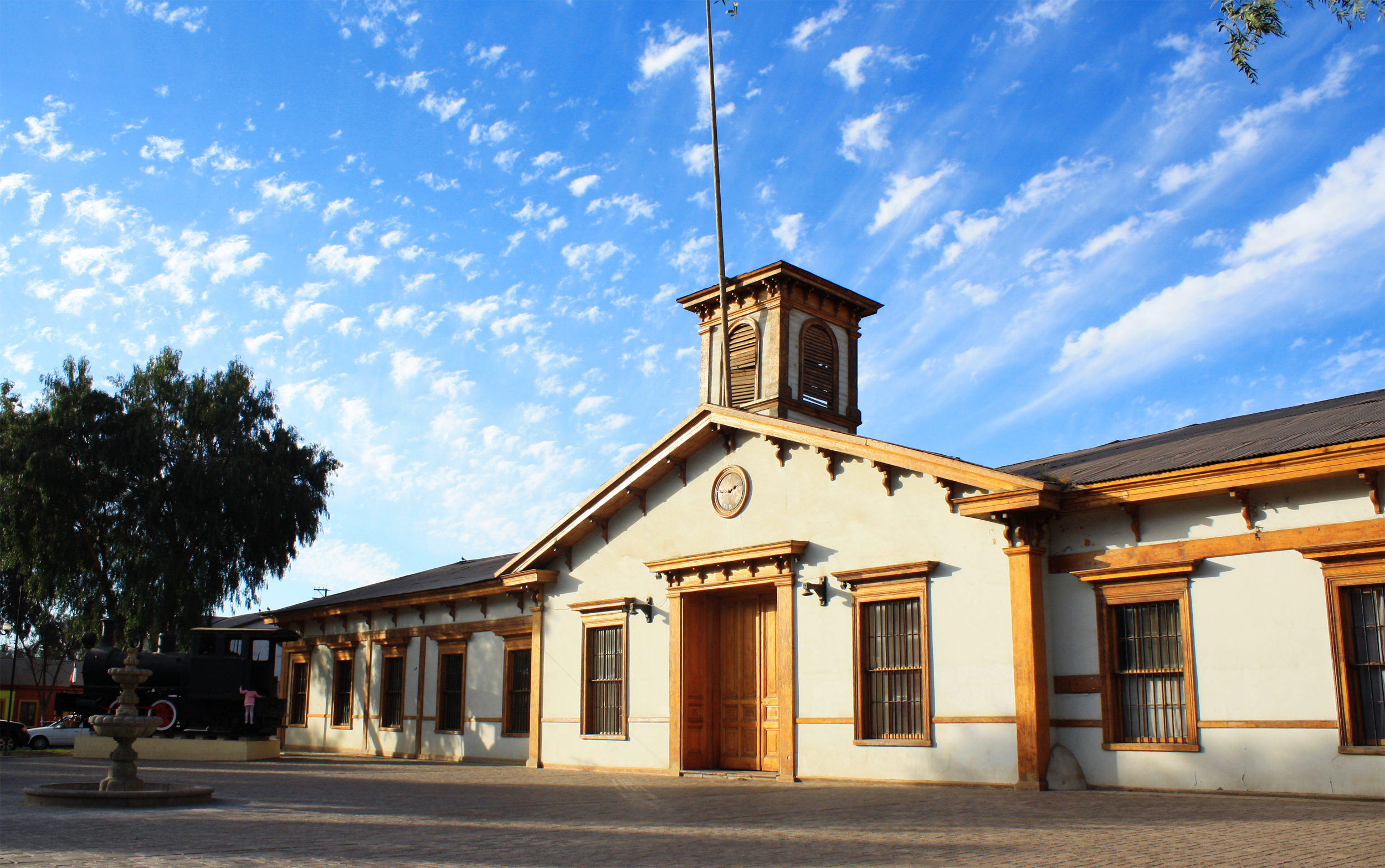
Copiapo Station, now a historical monument in the Atacama region

The 25 December 1851 was unforgettable for Copiapó. To the rhythm of bells and whistles the first train that made the full journey from Caldera made its entrance to the so called silver capital of Chile, hauled by a locomotive named after the city. It was a triumph for businessman William Wheelwright, an American living in Chile, who after successfully promoting the foundation of the Pacific Steam Navigation Company, embarked on the enterprise of developing the first railway in Chile. He managed to interest several wealthy businessmen, obtaining an initial capital of 800,000 pesos at the time. On 20 November 1849 the government of Manuel Bulnes gave him a firm concession for the nascent Compañía del Camino Ferro-Carril de Copiapó. The reason for building the railway was the discovery in 1832 by Juan Godoy, a humble woodcutter, an enormous silver deposit in Chañarcillo. The need to transport the ore from the interior to the coast, combined with the availability of capital, led to this first Chilean railway.

The works began in March 1850 under the aegis of North American engineers Walton Evans and the Campbell brothers, Alejandro and Allan. 1,435 mm (4 ft 8 1/2 in) standard gauge was chosen and the layout of the port to the interior was the same as it is today, although the original track was relaid to 1,000 mm (3 ft 3 3/8 in) metre gauge (for compatibility with the Northern Network) at the beginning of the 20th century. The locomotives and complementary rolling stock were entrusted to the Norris Locomotive Works in the United States, which built many of the powerful machines that opened the path to the West. The equipment arrived on 21 June 1851 in Caldera at 30 km/h.

Thomson says that Wheelwright tried to open the first section on 4 July to coincide with US Independence day but it was not possible. The first test took place on 29 July and was the first time a train ran in Chile, and the third in South America. (Note: (The first was in Georgetown-Plaisance (8 km) in British Guiana, opened in November 1848. The second was the Callao-Limaline (14 km), which began operations in April 1851.)

From 1 January the train made a daily journey. It left Copiapó at 9 am and arrived at 1 pm in Caldera. At 3 pm it began its return from the port to arrive in the city at 6.30. For those who traveled in first class the ticket cost 4 pesos and 2 reales. For those who traveled in second class, the ticket cost 2 pesos and 1 real. The cargo rate was 4 reals per quintal. Twice a week, a mail train ran in whose last car ran a gambling bank called "la timba", which lightened the pockets of the hard-working miners who were fond of gambling.

The track was later extended to the nearby towns of Puquios and San Antonio and a station was built in Copiapó. They also acquired the route to Chañarcillo, completing 142 kilometers of track. Wheelwright dreamed of a transcontinental railroad but, although he obtained concessions in Argentina, he fell 400 kilometers short of the total of 1,375 needed to complete his dream.

For 58 years the railroad was privately operated, but the decline of mining and the high rates charged led to a campaign to have it purchased by the state, which happened in 1910.

== Southern Network ==
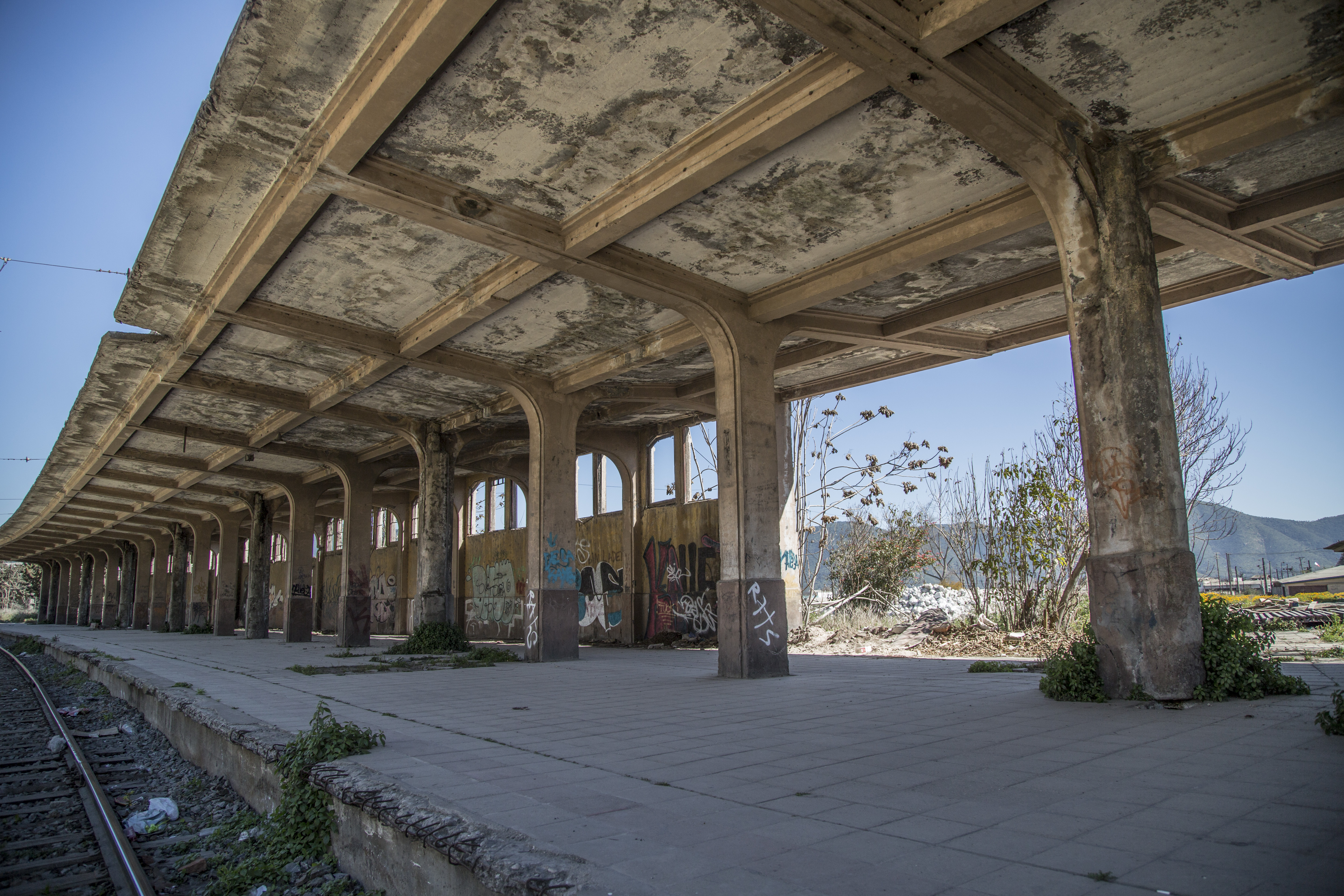
La Calera Station platforms

The main line from Valparaíso to Puerto Montt and all its associated branches and sub-branches is known as the Red Sur de Ferrocarriles del Estado (in English, the Southern network of the state railways.

Some of its most important points are (or were), La Calera, where it connected with the North Network, Alameda Station (better known as Central Station) in Santiago and the stations located in large cities from Santiago to Puerto Montt (Talca, Chillán, Temuco, etc).

Practically the entire South Network was built by the State of Chile, initially to unite the few existing cities south of Santiago and later to integrate and establish sovereignty over the Araucanía territories that were being colonized.

Given that the longitudinal track runs, in general terms, in a north-south direction through the central valley of the country, a large number of branches connect(ed) to it reachingi the cities located to the east and west of the main line. For operational, political-social and even financial reasons, many of the old branches were abandoned and dismantled after competition from road transport became more important. They can provide freight services such as Santiago – San Antonio, San Pedro – Ventanas, Llay – Llay – Los Andes – Saladillo; or passengers services between close large cities such as Corto del Laja (Talcahuano – Laja) or the Biotrén (which connects the communes of Talcahuano, San Pedro de la Paz, Coronel, Chiguayante and Hualqui with Concepción).

An exceptional case is the 1,000 mm (3 ft 3 3/8 in) metre gauge Talca-Constitución line. A railbus to provides a subsidized service to a series of towns located on the bank of the Maule River that do not have road access. After temporary interruption as a result of the devastation caused by the earthquake of 27 February 2010, the service was restored, currently operating normally between Talca and Constitución.

As of 2020, practically the entire trunk network is used to transport cargo, although only a small section from Valparaíso to Limache and from Santiago Alameda Station to Chillán continue to provide passenger services.

=== Santiago–Valparaíso railway ===
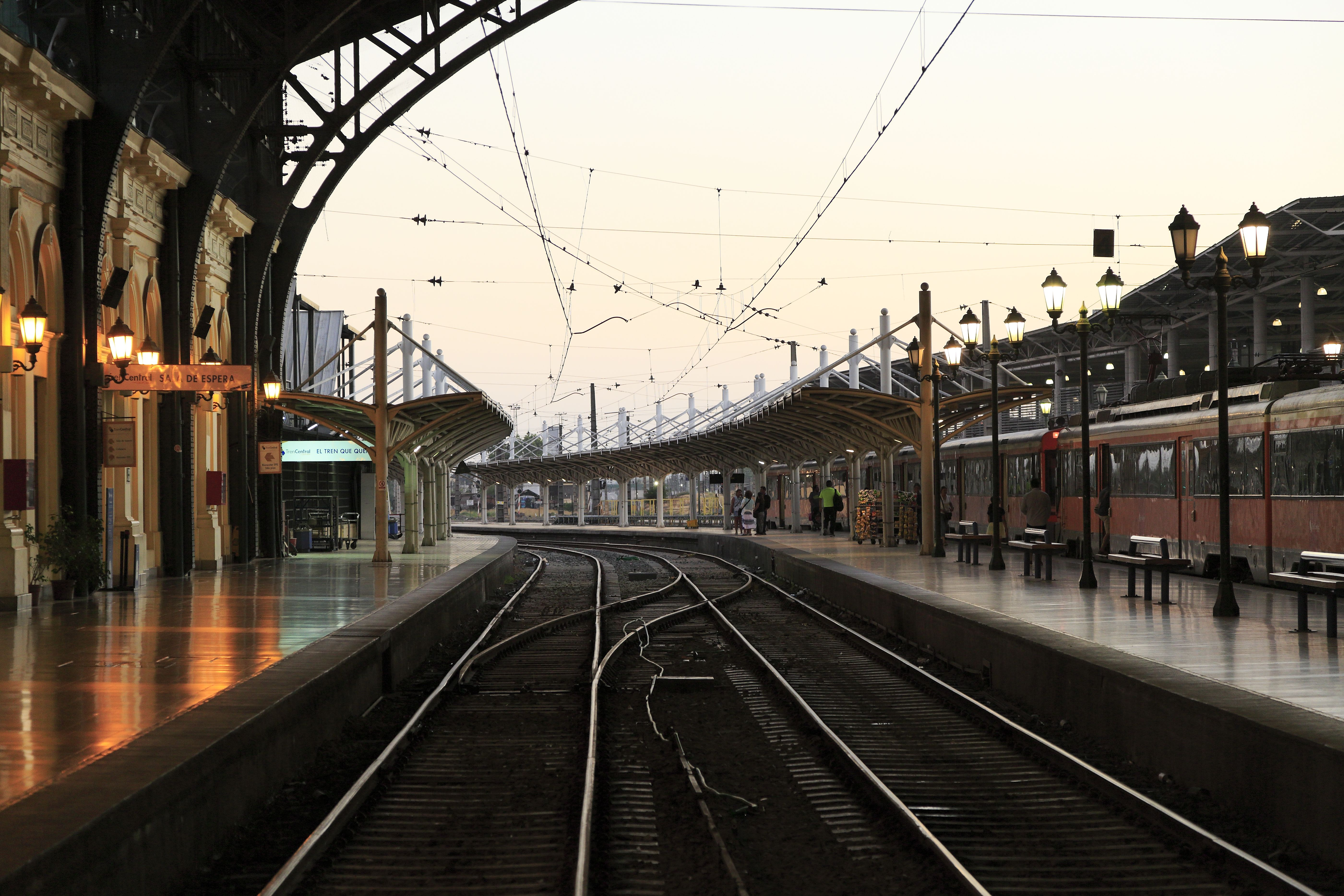
Estación Central, km 0 for the national network

The existing rail line between Santiago and Valparaíso was opened in 1863, and is 187 km (116 mi) long, single-track and designed to avoid steep gradients through mountainous terrain. Passenger service ceased on this line in 1987, and freight traffic almost non-existent since then. Proposals have existed since the 1990s to build a more direct line between the two cities for passengers and freight. The section from Valparaíso to Limache was doubled and put underground in Viña del Mar as part of the Valparaíso Metro.

=== Chiloé railway ===
The Chiloé railway was a 600 mm (1 ft 11 5/8 in) gauge railway on Chiloé Island, running between Ancud and Castro, with a spur to the Lechagua port. It operated between 1912 and 1960.

== Structures ==
- The Conchi viaduct on the FCALP was the second highest bridge in the world at the time of its construction in 1890.
- The Malleco Viaduct on the southern longitudinal line near Collipulli is only a few centimetres less high.
- The 4.5 km Las Raíces Tunnel on the Púa Lonquimay line was the longest tunnel in South America at the time of its opening in 1938.

== Other lines ==
Railway map of Chile in 2023

In addition to all these longitudinal lines, the Chilean railway network had endless branches of a local nature, with almost all of Chile connected from Iquique to Puerto Montt. Some of the branches were:

- Tacna-Arica Railway (Peru)
- Villa Industrial-Tacora
- Arica–La Paz railway (Bolivia)
- Iquique-Pisagua
- Ferrocarril de Junín: Caleta Junín–Zapiga .
- Agua Santa railway: Caleta Buena-Negreiros and branches.
- Tocopilla nitrate railway
  - Tocopilla–Toco and branches.
  - Tocopilla-María Elena-Pedro de Valdivia nitrate works
- Ollagüe-Collaguasi
- Antofagasta-Mejillones
- Antofagasta-Aguas Blancas and branches
- Taltal-Catalina and branches (Cachinal, Santa Luisa, etc.).
- Carrizalillo-Las Bombas
- Diego de Almagro-Chañaral
- Chañaral-Mina Las Ánimas
- Diego de Almagro-Potrerillos
- Copiapó-Puquíos
- San Antonio and branch to Chañarcillo
- Carrizal Bajo-Merceditas-Jarillas and branches (Carrizal Alto, Astillas, Manganeso, Yerba Buena, etc.)
- Vallenar-Huasco
- Vallenar-Pedro León Gallo
- Ferrocarril de la Mina El Tofo -Cruz Grande
- Coquimbo-El Romeral mine
- La Serena-Vicuña-Rivadavia
- Ovalle-Tongoy
- Illapel-Salamanca
- La Ligua-Papudo
- La Ligua-Cabildo-Petorca
- San Felipe-Putaendo
- Llaillay-Los Andes-Portillo
- Quillota-Concón-Quintero
- Santiago-Melipilla-Cartagena
- Santiago-Puente Alto-El Volcán
- Rancagua-Sewell
- Rancagua-Doñihue
- Pelequén-Peumo-El Manzano
- San Fernando-Santa Cruz-Pichilemu
- Curicó-Licantén
- Talca-Constitución
- Talca-San Clemente
- Linares-Colbún
- Parral-Cauquenes
- Chillán-Recinto
- Chillán-Coelemu-Dichato
- General Cruz-Cartago
- Monte Águila-Polcura
- Concepción-Rucapequén (Chillán)
- Concepción-Curanilahue
- Carampangue-Arauco
- Santa Fe-Los Ángeles-Santa Bárbara
- Coihue-Nacimiento
- Coihue-Negrete-Mulchén
- Los Sauces-Lebu
- Renaico-Angol-Traiguén
- Púa-Traiguén
- Púa-Lonquimay (which comprised the Las Raíces Tunnel)
- Los Sauces-Capitán Pastene
- Temuco-Carahue
- Cajón-Cherquenco
- Freire-Toltén
- Freire-Cunco
- Loncoche-Villarrica
- Lanco-Panguipulli
- Antilhue-Valdivia
- Los Lagos-Riñihue
- La Unión-Lago Ranco and branch to Entre Lagos
- Osorno-Lago Rupanco
- Corte Alto-Los Muermos
- Ancud-Lechagua
- Ancud-Castro
- Puerto Natales-Puerto Bories
- Punta Arenas-Loreto mine

== See also ==
- Chilean silver rush
- Occupation of Araucanía
- Rail transport in Chile
- Saltpetre Republic
- La Calera railway station
