= La Calera railway station =

Railway station in La Calera, Chile

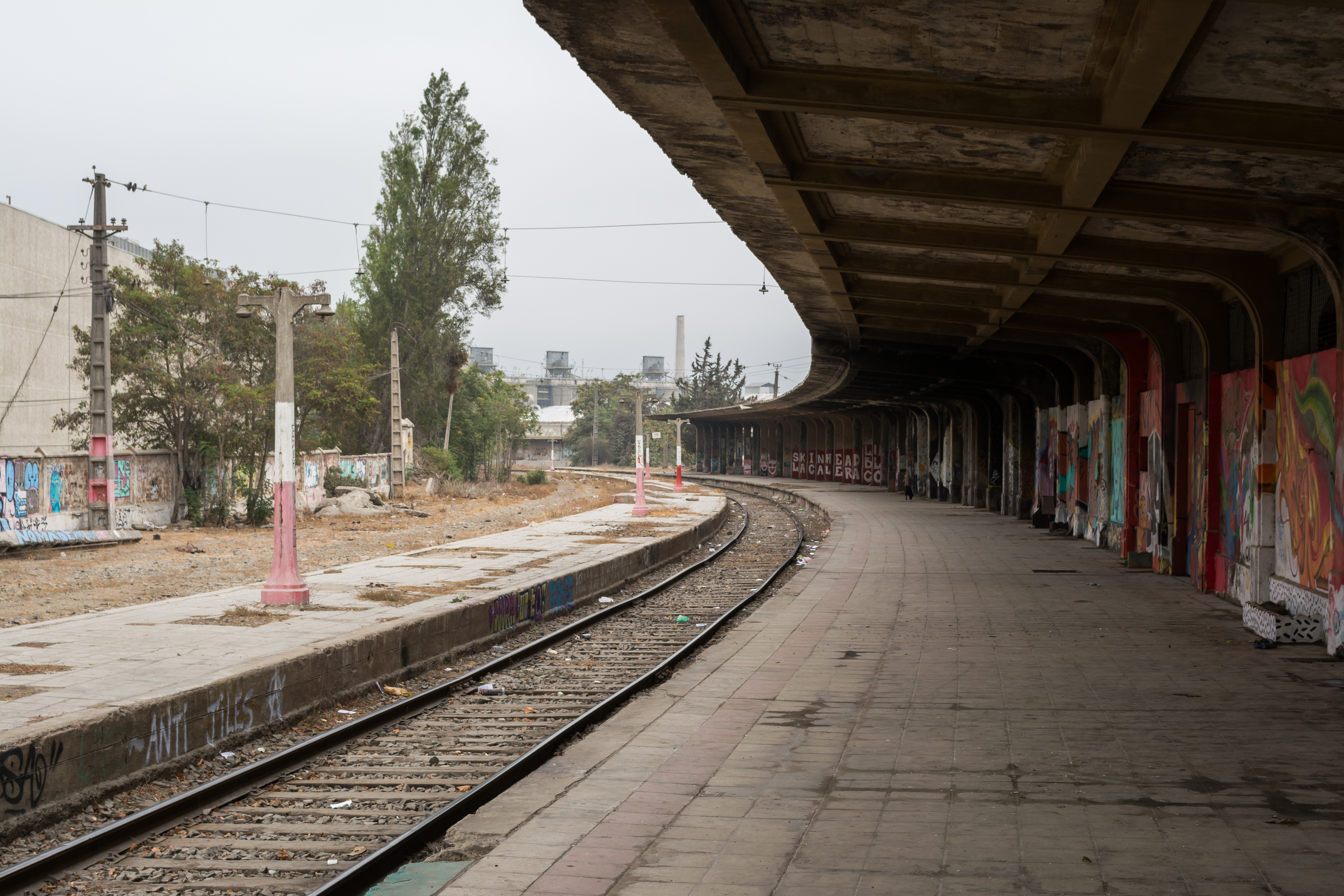
- Platforms of the Valparaíso to Santiago railway at La Calera station (2020).

General information
- Location: La Calera, Valparaíso Region; Chile
- Coordinates: 40.7128°N 74.0060°W
- Distance: 119 km (FCSV) 0 km (Red Norte)

History
- Opened: 1 February 1861
- Closed: 1995
- Rebuilt: c. 2027–2028 (Limache–Puerto extension) c. 2036 (Santiago–Valparaíso train)
Location
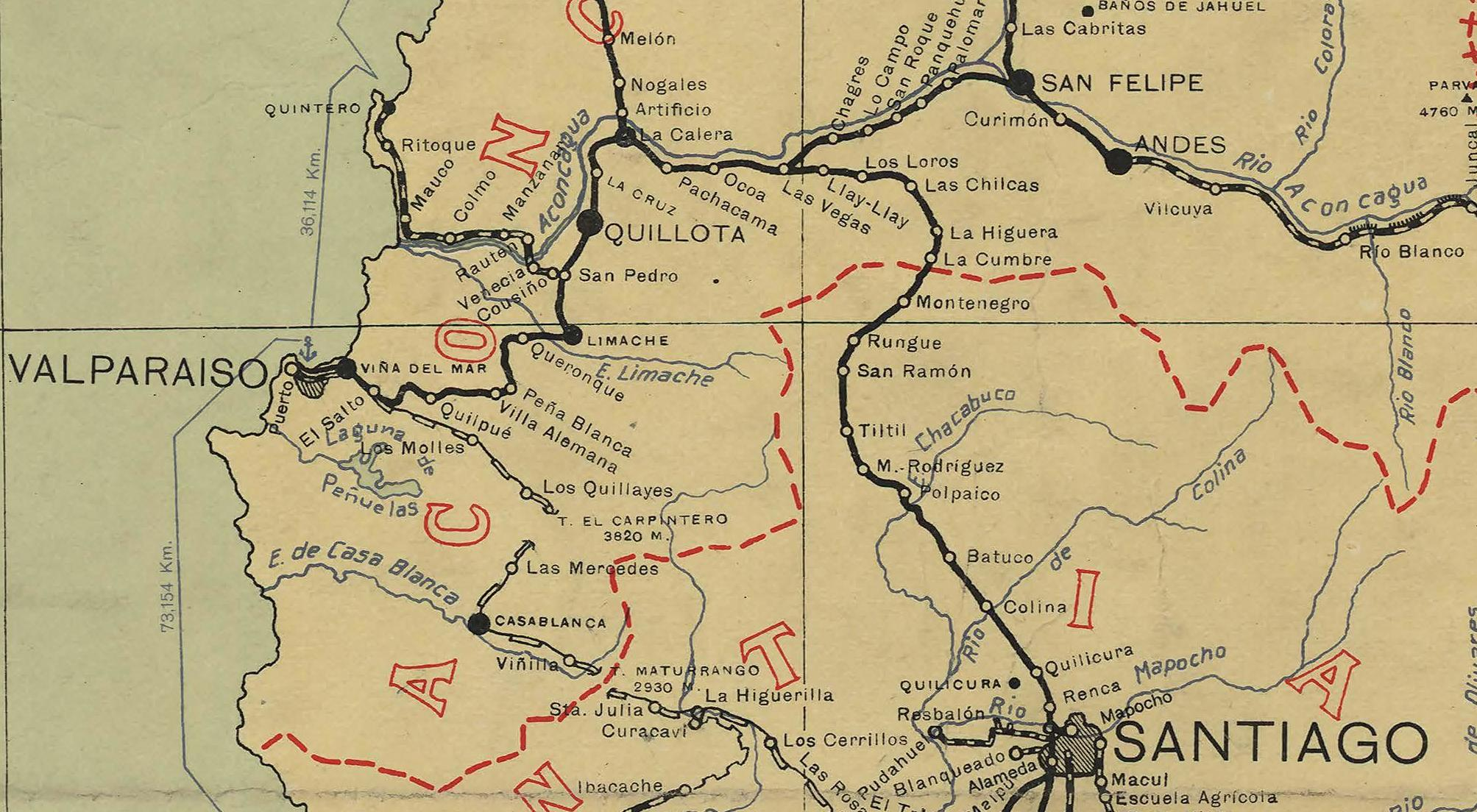
- Map of the railway route from Valparaíso to Santiago, including La Calera station (1929).

La Calera railway station, also known as La Calera or just Calera, is a Chilean railway station administered by Empresa de los Ferrocarriles del Estado and Ferronor located in the La Calera commune, Valparaíso Region.

The station was inaugurated in 1861 as part of the branch line of the Valparaíso to Santiago railway, which was under construction at that time. From 1898 it gained greater relevance by becoming the terminal station of the Longitudinal Norte, where it served as an interchange between the northern railway section of the country and the railway between Santiago and Valparaíso, which in turn had a connection with the Longitudinal Sur. This position as a connection point between these two railway networks led La Calera to be considered one of the most important railway stations in the country during the 20th century. Due to the decline in freight and passenger transport at the end of the 20th century, the station was closed for passenger services in 1995.

In 2014, the station was declared a National Historic Monument. Since the start of operations of the current Limache–Puerto train (formerly Metro Valparaíso), there has been social pressure to extend the service to La Calera. In 2019, the start of basic engineering studies for the project to extend the service to this station was announced, within the national plan "Chile sobre Rieles". The reopening of the station for the Limache–Puerto train passenger service has been projected to occur between 2027 and 2028.

== History ==
=== 19th century ===
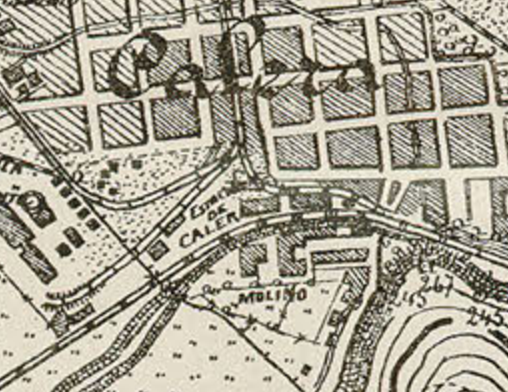
Map of the station in 1890; it only had two small buildings.

The Valparaíso to Santiago railway began its construction process in 1852 in the city of Valparaíso. On 1 February 1861 the railway was opened to public traffic up to La Calera. Following the opening of the station, and due to financial administration problems as well as the great complexity of construction in the territory, in January 1863 Enrique Meiggs was hired as the new engineer in charge of completing the works, including minor remaining works in La Calera, which were finished on 3 July 1863. On 16 September that year, the entire Santiago–Valparaíso line was inaugurated.

With the construction and planning of the railway network in the northern zone of Chile, the administration of President Domingo Santa María requested studies for a railway reaching La Serena, which led to President José Manuel Balmaceda contracting the company North and South American Construction Company in 1888 for the construction of various railway sections, including the construction of 71 kilometers of track between La Calera and Cabildo, a section built in metre gauge, unlike the railway between Santiago and Valparaíso which had broad gauge.

With the construction work on the new railway line, in 1890 the station building and its premises were refurbished and expanded. In 1891, La Calera square, located in front of the current station building, was inaugurated. The railway between La Calera and Cabildo was inaugurated on 31 January 1898.

=== 20th century ===
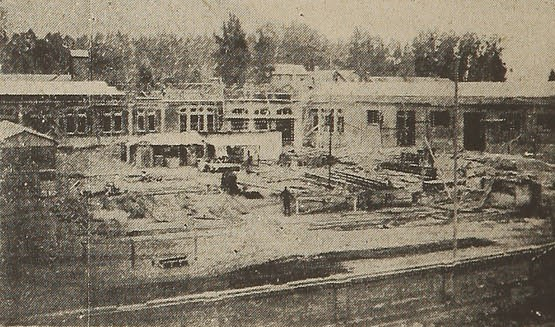
Current La Calera station building under construction (1934).

In 1916, the administration of the La Calera–Cabildo railway was definitively transferred to the northern railway network. Due to the relevance the station had acquired since the 1920s, new railway infrastructure was needed in La Calera to cope with the flow of trains in the area. In 1923, work continued on the framework of the engine shed, as well as construction work on the turntable, the enclosure of the engine shed, and other infrastructure works.

In 1931, the Architecture Department of the Empresa de los Ferrocarriles del Estado developed the plans for the current train station building. Rail and warehouse replacement work began in 1932 and was completed two years later. The new structure was built with reinforced concrete and the works were in charge of engineer Hans V. Kiesling, at a cost of 804,960 pesos.

Due to the nationwide decline in railways starting in the 1970s, passenger services were discontinued. In 1975, public transport between La Calera and Iquique ceased, and shortly after, service to La Serena–Coquimbo was interrupted. In 1989, the track infrastructure of the Longitudinal Norte became wholly owned by Ferronor, which led in 1990 to the cessation of all passenger and freight services between La Calera and Iquique due to the company's internal policy, arguing it was not public and these services caused economic losses.

In February 1993, it was announced that from the first fortnight of March that year, the service between Valparaíso and La Calera would only run as far as Limache and that a service between Llay-Llay and Valparaíso would be left with a stop at La Calera, which came into effect in May that year. In June 1995, the last passenger train with a stop at the station ran, while the following year the station's electrical wiring for electric locomotives was removed. In 1997, the last freight train ran on the northern railway between La Calera and Iquique.

Following the privatization of the northern railway network through bidding in 1996, the station grounds, its infrastructure, and its yards came to be administered by the Empresa de los Ferrocarriles del Estado —infrastructure of the Valparaíso to Santiago railway— and by Ferronor —section of the station dedicated to the northern railway. The space has been used by the latter to provide services to the Cemento Melón industry.

=== 21st century ===
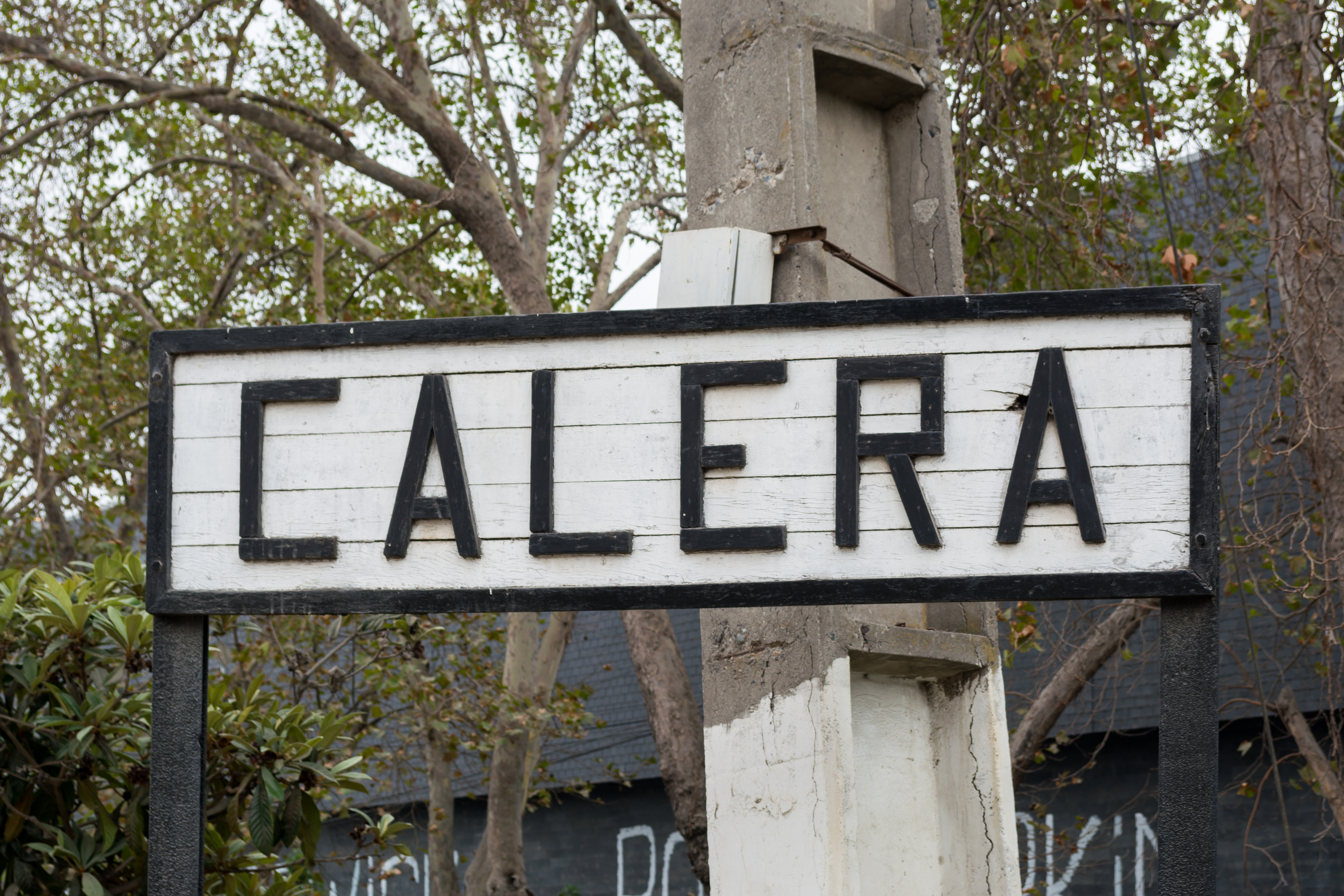
Station sign (2020).

Due to its state of abandonment —part of its facilities were used for cultural activities and by a restaurant—, in 2011 the municipality of La Calera leased the premises for 20 years to maintain it and reintegrate it into the citizenry. On 22 July 2014 the station and the La Calera turntable were declared National Historic Monument by Decree No. 306, while the station premises were declared a typical zone. That same year, the municipality held an event during Cultural Heritage Day, where the idea of transforming the building into a museum and cultural center was widely accepted by the people of La Calera. With the declaration of historical heritage, a restoration project for the main building and its turntable was also announced so that the station would become a communal historical center.

Since the cessation of services was announced in 1993, authorities have sought to reactivate the service, as it is a necessity for the area. With the beginning of the 21st century, President Ricardo Lagos indicated his intentions to extend the Valparaíso Regional Metro to La Calera; but it was not until December 2017 that the triennial plan of the Empresa de los Ferrocarriles del Estado was approved, which led to the tendering of engineering designs for the extension of the Limache–Puerto train service to Quillota and La Calera. However, on 26 September that year, the Empresa de los Ferrocarriles del Estado declared the tender deserted and withdrew it. This event caused pressure from various mayors of the Quillota and Limache area, which led to the tender being reactivated on 30 November 2018, with the aim of having proposals ready between January and February 2019.

Finally, on 29 May 2019, the basic engineering studies were awarded to the consortia CDI and Consultrans, a company that was granted a 2-year execution period. In parallel, the environmental impact study project was presented, aiming to begin construction in 2023 and start operations in the 2027–2028 period. The project, framed within the national program "Chile sobre Rieles" (Chile on Rails), aims for the journey between La Calera and Valparaíso to be 1 hour and 23 minutes and for the station to have double track using two platforms, as well as rehabilitating the shunting yard for the construction of a bus terminal.

On 13 January 2020, the tourist service Tren del Recuerdo made a stop at the station. On 25 September 2021, the train made another stop at the platforms.

As of February 2021, Ferronor installed sleepers and a new railway track on the northern platform of the station. In August that year, a rock grinding company operating within the station's yards was closed due to environmental damage.

On 6 December 2022, the La Calera–Artificio railcar began operations, a passenger service enabled by the Municipality of La Calera and Ferronor that connects the inhabitants of the town of La Calera with the next station on the line, Artificio station.

== Infrastructure ==
Simplified plan of the railway station (2014).

By 1890, the station was a one-story building with a single passenger platform for the Valparaíso to Santiago railway track, while the Longitudinal Norte section had a platform north of the station and had two sidings to the cement factories located in the commune.

The architectural design of the station is very similar to that of the Barón, Puerto Varas and Temuco stations, which used Portland cement for their structure. This architectural style and the materials used defined a new stage in national modernist construction. Although its architecture has been described as "modern international style of the '20s", the ornamental details inside and outside the building are of an art déco nature. Regarding size, the total surface area of the premises is approximately 80,270 m².

The tracks present in the Longitudinal Norte section of the station (metre gauge) are owned by Ferronor. The approximate maximum circulation speed for freight trains is 20 km/h.

=== Main building and engine shed ===
The main building of the station is Y-shaped, with one side having platforms for locomotives of the Santiago–Valparaíso line, while on the internal angle there are platforms for the northern line. The building was constructed to house the entrance hall, ticket office, waiting room, buffet, a mobilization office, station master's office, offices, radio room, management office, office for the northern transport section, a medical clinic, and a dental clinic. It also features a warehouse parallel to the line towards Valparaíso, a diesel vehicle workshop, a small fort, and, at the station entrance, a public square.

The engine shed has a structure made up of eleven rigid steel frames arranged to form a canopy. There is also a turntable in the center of the shed.

== Services ==
=== Former ===
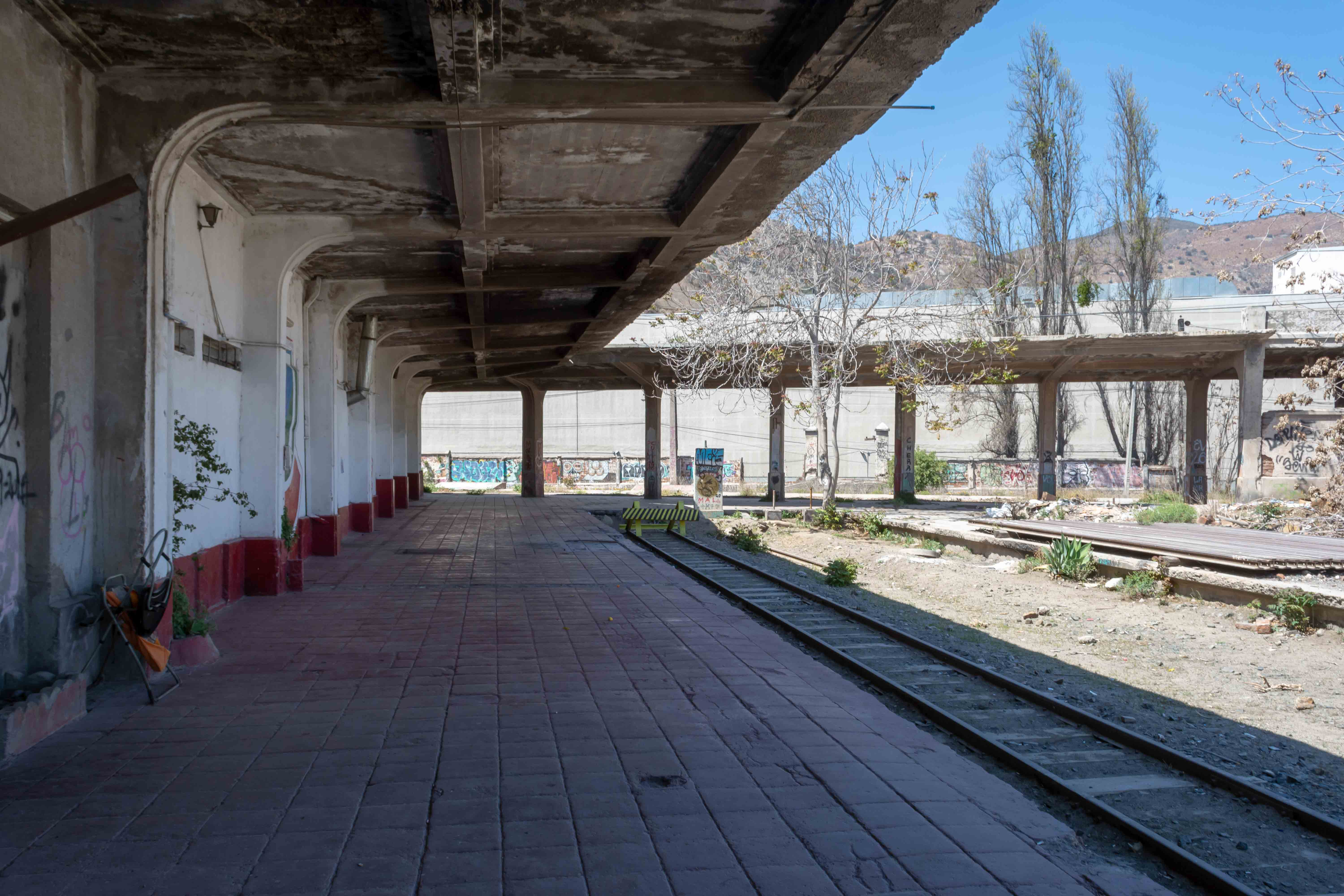
Longitudinal Norte platforms.

After the construction of the Longitudinal Norte in 1931, the station had weekly passenger services to Illapel, Ovalle, Coquimbo, La Serena, Vallenar, Copiapó, Pueblo Hundido (current commune of Diego de Almagro), Chañaral, Antofagasta and Iquique, in addition to daily services to closer localities such as Cabildo, Pedegua, Petorca and Papudo. Long-distance services used locomotives, while local services used railcars. Regarding the southern railway section that stopped at the station, it was a stop for services such as Puerto–Llay-Llay, Puerto–Santiago and Los Andes, which later served as a connection with the Trasandino railway.

Local passenger services between La Calera and Coquimbo were suspended by the Empresa de los Ferrocarriles del Estado by decree of 1 June 1975.

=== Present ===
Since 6 December 2022, the passenger service of the La Calera–Artificio railcar has been in operation, an inter-local service connecting this station with Artificio station and the La Sirenita stop. The service has seating for ten people and operates in the morning and afternoon.

=== Future ===
During 2019, the tender for engineering studies for the extension of the Limache–Puerto train to this station was announced; these were completed in July 2021. The work contemplates the construction of three new railway tracks ―two for passengers and one for freight―, as well as the implementation of electrical wiring for the trains. It is estimated that the La Calera–Puerto journey will last one hour and twenty-three minutes, which will represent a saving of three hours on round trips.

In parallel with the La Calera-Artificio railcar service, there have been conversations for the construction of the Tren de la Costa, an interregional passenger service that would run through the communes of La Calera, Nogales, Zapallar, Papudo, La Ligua and Los Vilos, and which received political support from local and regional governments.

== Bibliography ==
- Medina, Paula (2018). Rehabilitación estación de tren La Calera: recuperando el patrimonio en ciudades de origen ferroviario [Rehabilitation of La Calera train station: recovering heritage in cities of railway origin] (Memoria para optar al título de Arquitecto). Universidad de Chile.
- Rojas, Juan José (2013). Estación de ferrocarriles de La Calera: Reinterpretación del espacio en abandono en la ciudad [La Calera railway station: Reinterpretation of abandoned space in the city] (PDF). Valparaíso: Escuela de Arquitectura y Diseño, Pontificia Universidad Católica de Valparaíso.
