= Alerce, Chile =

Alerce El Arryan
- Town
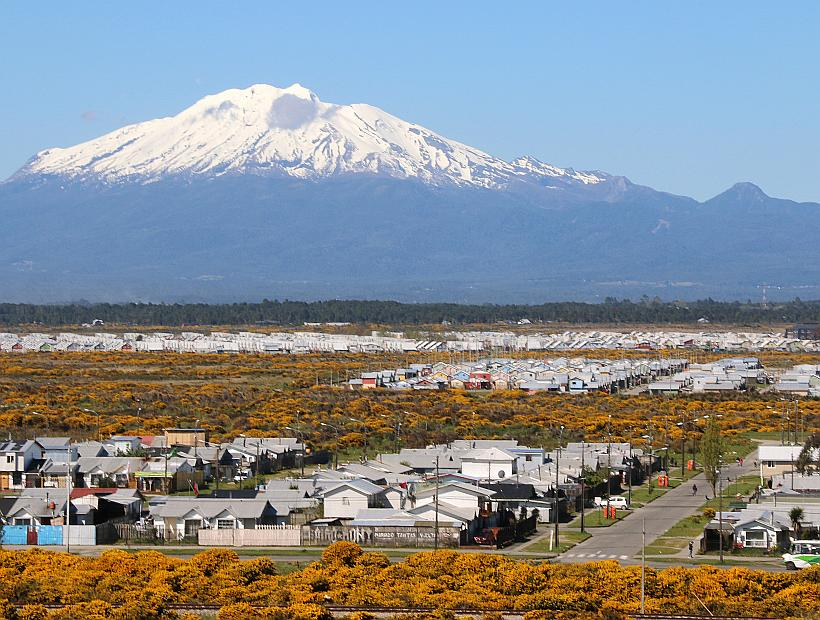
- Interactive map of Alerce
- Country: Chile
- Region: Los Lagos
- Province: Llanquihue
- Comuna: Puerto Montt

Area
  - Total: 797 km^{2} (308 sq mi)

Population (2017)
  - Total: 42,267
  - Density: 53.0/km^{2} (137/sq mi)

Alerce is a Chilean town (and satellite village of Puerto Montt) in the communes of Puerto Montt and Puerto Varas in Llanquihue Province, Los Lagos Region. It had a population of 42,267 people in 2017.

== History ==
The town (originally called El Arryan) was first delimited in 1863 as the third district of the Llanquihue province.

In 1998, the ministry of housing and urbanism put in motion a project to make Alerce a satellite city/village of Puerto Montt, with the objective of building 3000 homes in 2 years. The satellite city was inaugurated in December 2002.

== Transportation ==
The town is connected to Puerto Montt and Puerto Varas via the V-505 route.

The town counts with a train station which connects it to Puerto Montt, Puerto Varas and Llanquihue.

== See also ==
- List of towns in Chile
