= Llanquihue – Puerto Montt Line =

Inter-city rail service in Chile

Llanquihue - Puerto Montt Line
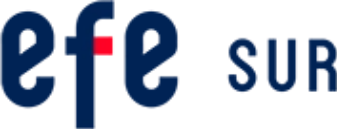

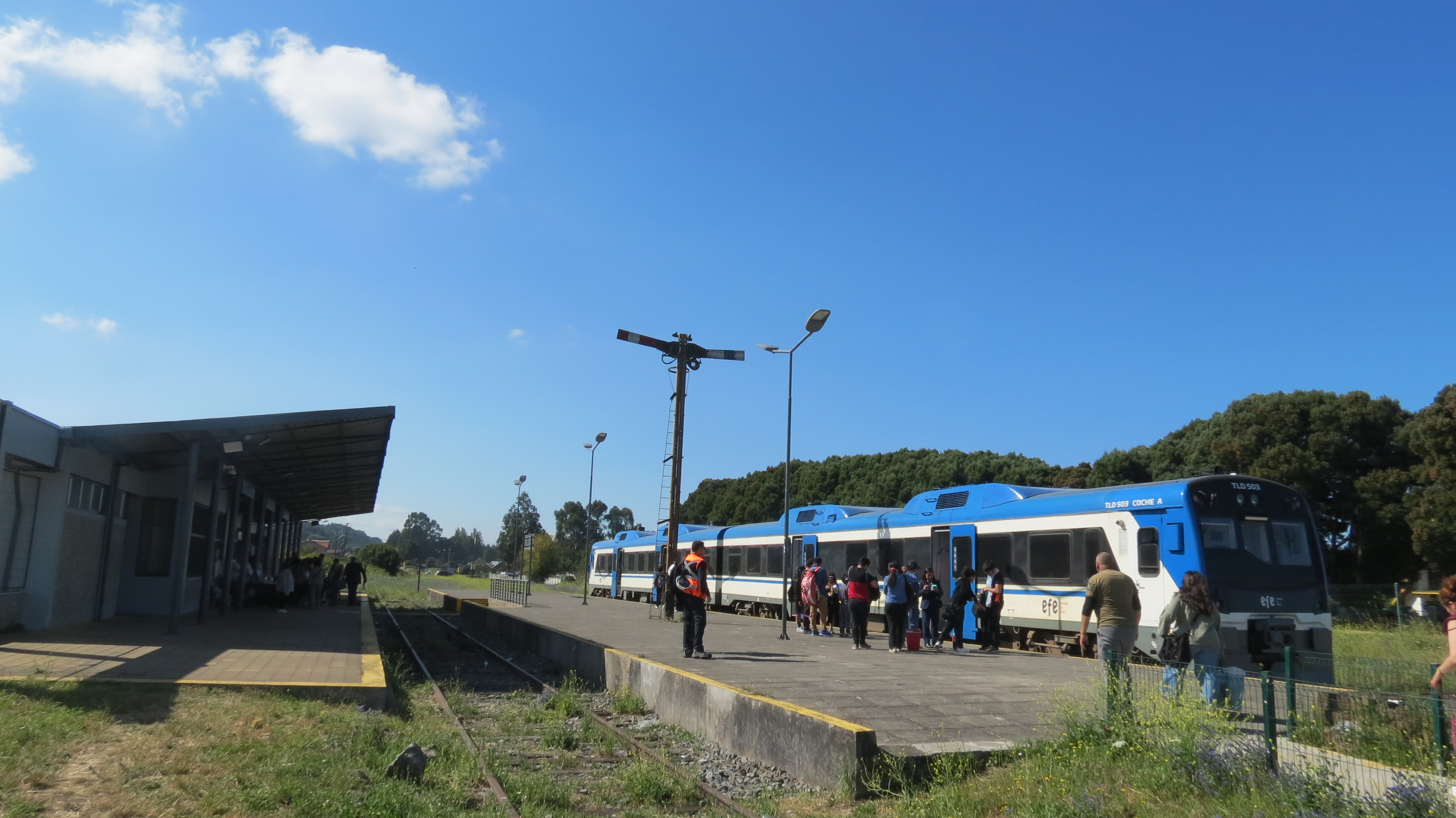
- Llanquihue – Puerto Montt at Estacion Llanquihue

Overview
- Owner: Empresa de los Ferrocarriles del Estado
- Locale: Los Lagos Region
- Termini: Llanquihue; Puerto Montt - La Paloma

Service
- Type: Commuter rail
- Operator(s): EFE Sur
- Daily ridership: 1,282 (2025)

History
- Opened: April 22, 2025

Technical
- Line length: 27.4 km (17.03 mi)
- Track gauge: 1,676 mm (5 ft 6 in)
- Operating speed: 44.5 km/h (28 mph)

Llanquihue – Puerto Montt Line is a Chilean commuter rail service opened on April 22, 2025. It is operated by EFE Sur, a subsidiary of the Empresa de los Ferrocarriles del Estado (EFE). The route covers a length of 27.4 kilometres, connecting the municipalities of Puerto Montt, Alerce, Puerto Varas and Llanquihue, in the Los Lagos Region.
