= Alerce Train Station =

Railway station in Alerce, Chile

Alerce Station Estacion Alerce
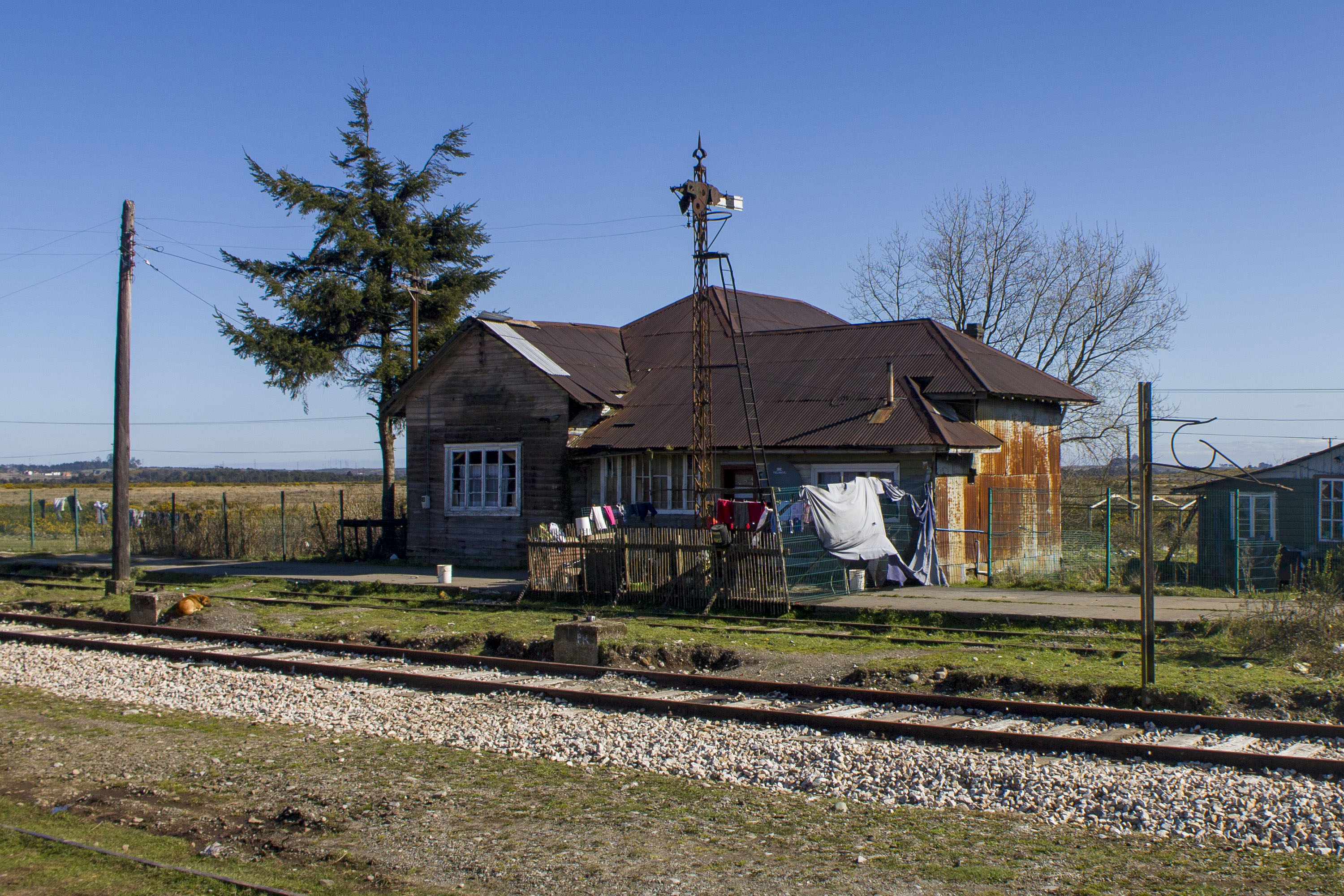

General information
- Location: Los Alerces Avenue; Los Lagos; Chile
- Train operators: Empresa de Ferrocariles del Estado

Construction
- Structure type: At-grade

History
- Opened: 1911
Location

Alerce train station is the main train station serving the town of Alerce in Los Lagos, Chile.

== History ==
The station was inaugurated in 1911, as the Arryan Station (later renamed to Alerce Station in 1923).

As of 2025 the Llanquihue-Puerto Montt service is the station's only passenger service. (inaugurated in 2025), which connects Alerce to the cities of Puerto Montt, Puerto Varas and Llanquihue.
