= Kampung Sungai Memperas, Sungai Bari =

Kampung Sungai Memperas is a satellite village located in Sungai Bari, Setiu, Terengganu, Malaysia. The village is under the administration of JKKK Sungai Bari, which has full responsibility for the management and communication of information from the government to the people and to allocate funds and assistance delivered by the state or federal government.
