= Llanquihue Train Station =

Train Station in Los Lagos, Chile

Llanquihue Station Estacion Llanquihue
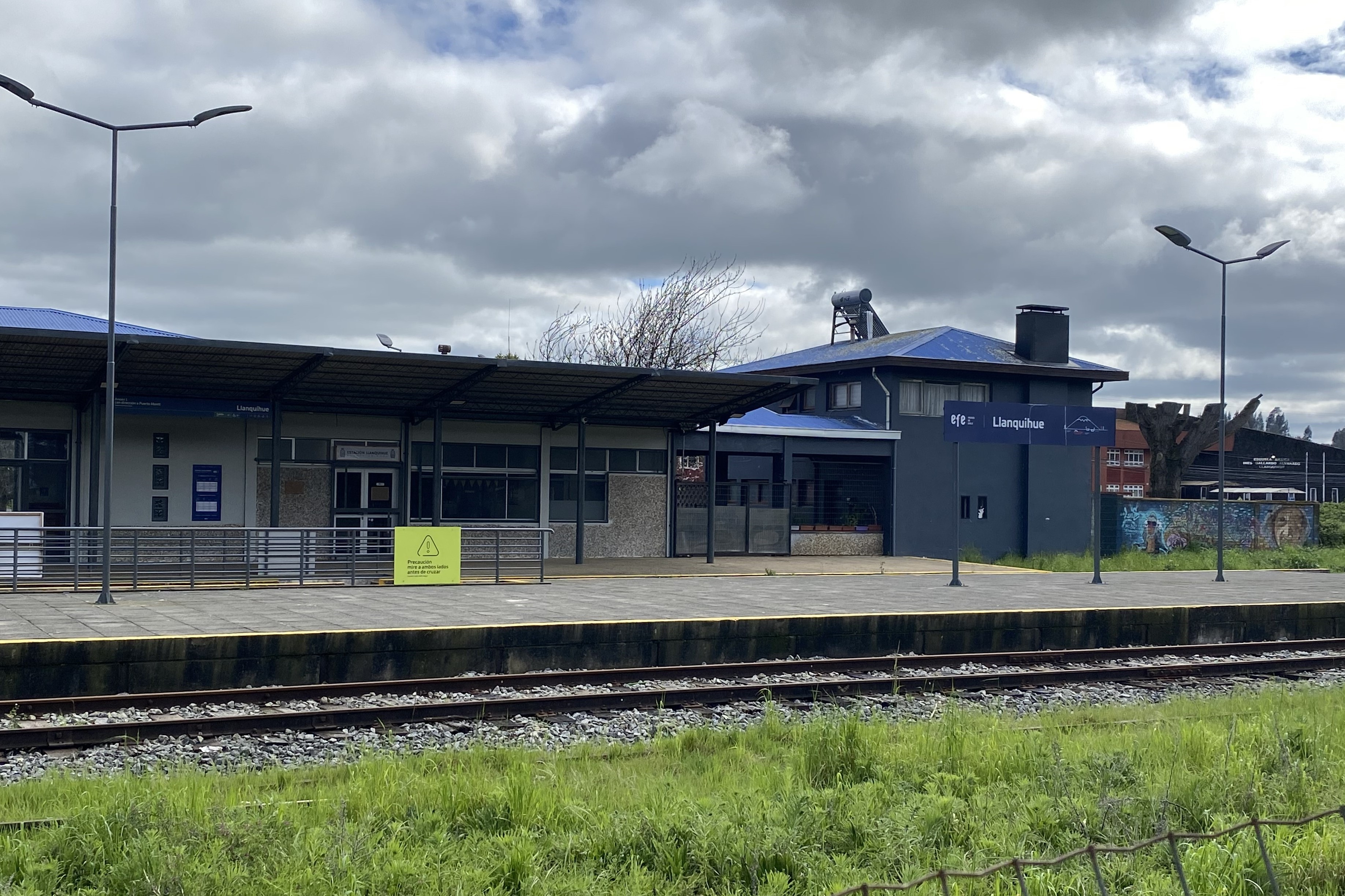

General information
- Location: Baquedano 1000; Los Lagos; Chile
- Coordinates: 41°15′11″S 73°00′23″W
- Train operators: Empresa de Ferrocariles del Estado

Construction
- Structure type: At-grade

History
- Opened: 1907
Location

The Llanquihue Train Station is the main train station servicing the City of Llanquihue, located in the Chilean region of Los Lagos.

== History ==
The station was originally inaugurated in 1907. After December 2005 it served the Temuco to Puerto Montt Service until 2007, when the service was ended.

After the service ended, the station was closed until 2025, when it was re-opened to passenger service thanks to the inauguration of the Tren Llanquihue-Puerto Montt service, connecting Llanquihue to the cities of Puerto Varas, Alerce and Puerto Montt.
