= Ferronor =

Chilean railway company

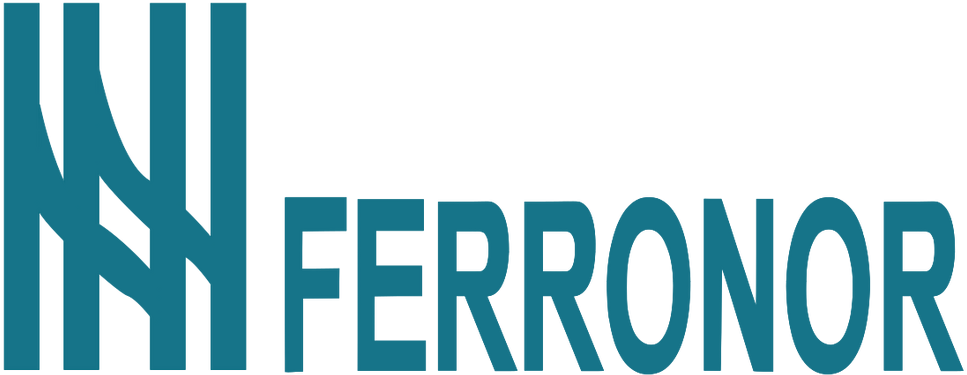

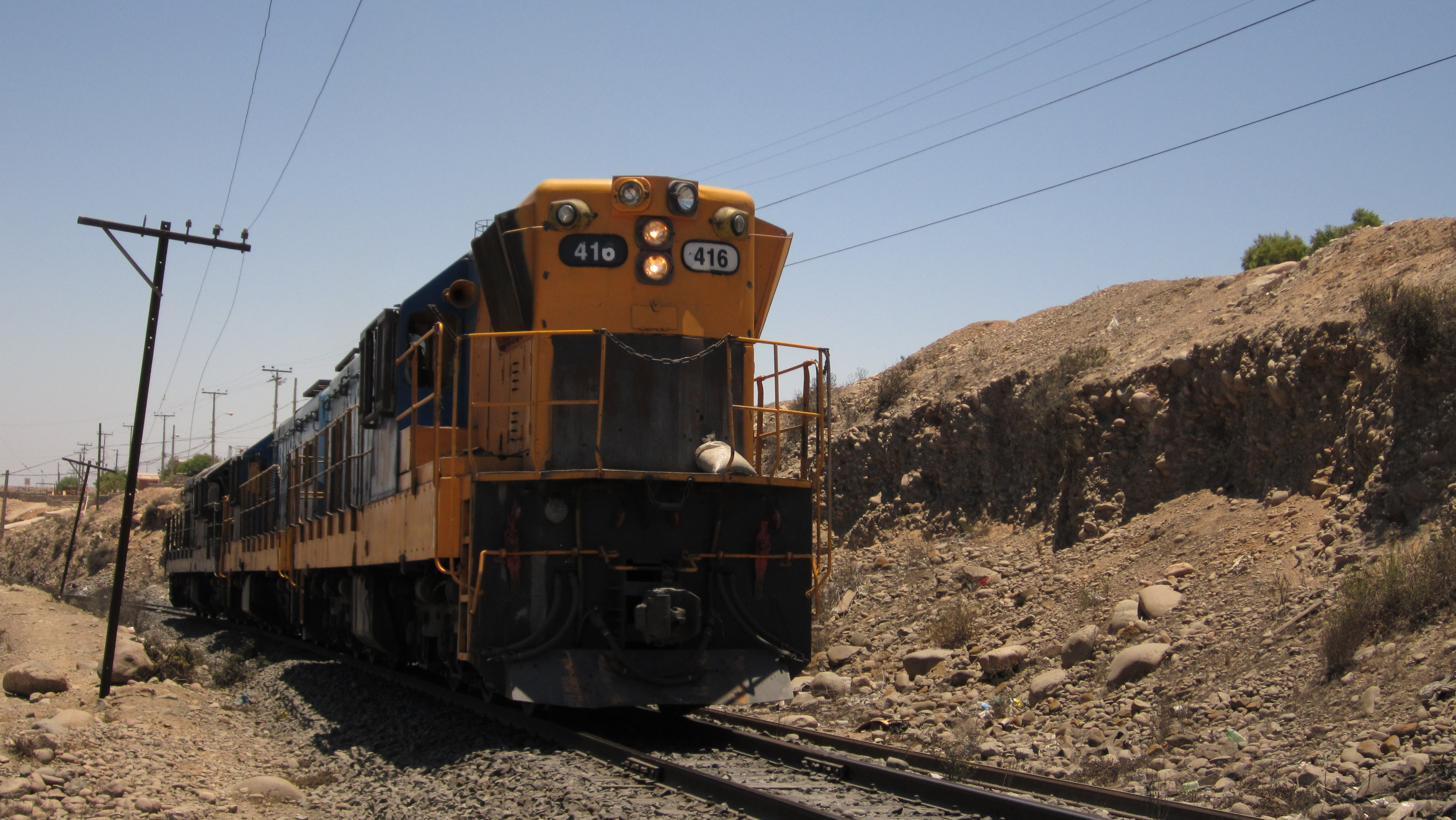
A Ferronor train

Ferronor (Empresa de Transporte Ferroviario S.A.) is a Chilean railway company operating on the old Red Norte (northern network) of Empresa de los Ferrocarriles del Estado, which was privatised in 1997. Since 2004 the primary shareholder is APCO.

Currently Ferronor owns a railway network of about 2,300 kilometres (1,400 mi), consisting of a 1,000 mm (3 ft 3 3/8 in) metre gauge main line between La Calera and Iquique and various spur lines. However, about 60% of the railway network are currently unused due to damage like landslides, washouts and rail theft. Ferronor mostly transports mining supplies and products.

Ferronor transports 7,000,000 tonnes of iron ore concentrate, 900,000 tonnes of salt, 290,000 tonnes of copper concentrate, 530,000 tonnes of sulfuric acid, 230,000 tonnes of copper cathodes and 35,000 tonnes of fuel annually. Other railway operators transport 2,200,000 tonnes of freight on Ferronor lines annually.

== Diego de Almagro division ==
The Diego de Almagro division connects Potrerillos (a now abandoned town and mine in the Andes at 2,800 metres (9,200 ft), only the smelter is still in use) with Llanta (filtration plant and workshops) and Diego de Almagro, where the line connects to the Longitudinal Norte, and continues to Chañaral and the harbor at Barquito. The Longitudinal Norte is still used from Diego de Almagro northward to connect Mina Franke.

The line was built starting 1916 by the Andes Copper Mining Company to connect the Potrerillos copper mine and smelter with Pueblo Hundido (now called Diego de Almagro), where it connected to the state railway network, which continued to Chañaral. At Chañaral, a branch was built to connect the harbor at Barquito with the state railway network. Production at the mine started ten years later. The railway was subsequently used to transport supplies to Potrerillos and refined copper to the harbor at Barquito.

In 1959, the El Salvador mine opened and the mine at Potrerillos subsequently shut down, however the smelter remained in operation. Since then, the liquified ore is transported by pipeline from El Salvador to a filtration plant near Llanta, from where the dried ore concentrate is transported by railway to the Potrerillos plant.

The copper refining process requires large quantities of sulfuric acid, which is produced on-site at Potrerillos. Potrerillos also supplies other plants with sulfuric acid, both by truck and railway. Facilities to transfer sulfuric acid from train to truck exist at Llanta and El Salado.

== Vallenar division ==
The Vallenar division connects the Los Colorados iron ore mine with the harbor at Huasco. It consists of a branch which connects the mine with the Longitudinal Norte north of Vallenar, which is then used southward to Vallenar. A further branch line then provides the link from Vallenar to Huasco.

== Baquedano division ==
The Baquedano division used to transport natural gas via Palestina and Socompa Pass to Argentina. This traffic ceased in 2006, after two Ferronor locomotives (408 and 412) were damaged in an accident in Argentina and the Argentinian operator Belgrano Cargas initially refused to repair and return the locomotives. The locomotives have since been repaired and returned to service for Ferronor, but traffic over Socompa Pass has not been resumed to date.

Ferronor also owns various steam locomotives and other historic rolling stock, which is on display in an open-air "museum" at Baquedano. However, most of the locomotives are stored outside without any protection and are in very bad condition.

== Locomotives ==
This is an incomplete list of locomotives used by Ferronor.

| Ferronor no. | Type | Order no. | Year built | Previous owners | Comments | Pictures |
|---|---|---|---|---|---|---|
| 71 - 72 | EMD G18U | 710938, 710939 | 1968 | Andes Copper Mining Co. | | |
| 73 | EMD SW1200 | | | Codelco | | |
| 81 - 82 | EMD G12 | 701651, 701652 | 1957 | Andes Copper Mining Co., Codelco | | |
| 83 | EMD G12 | 701954 | 1959 | Andes Copper Mining Co. | | |
| 91 - 93 | EMD GR12U | 710341 - 710353 | 1965 | Codelco | | |
| 94 | EMD G22CU | | 1971 | Codelco | Ordered by FCAB for Codelco to circumvent US export restrictions | |
| 401 - 419 | EMD GR12U | 700190 - 700208 | 1961 - 1962 | EFE Dt 13001 - 13019 | | |
| 420 | EMD GR12U | | | | | |
| 421 - 423 | EMD GR12U | 700209 - 700211 | | CAP | | |
| 424 - 426 | EMD GR12U | 710550 - 710552 | | CAP | | |
| 601 | EMD JT26CW-2B | | 1986 | FCCA | | |
| 2805, 2808 | EMD GP49 | | 1985 | Alaska Railroad | | |
| 4601 - 4606 | EMD GT46AC | | 2013 | | | |
| | EMD GL26C-2 | | | Queensland Rail | | |
| 2001 - 2013 | EMD GT38ACL | | | | | |
| 1501, 504, 1509 | GE U10B | | 1964 | FEVE | | |

== Gallery ==
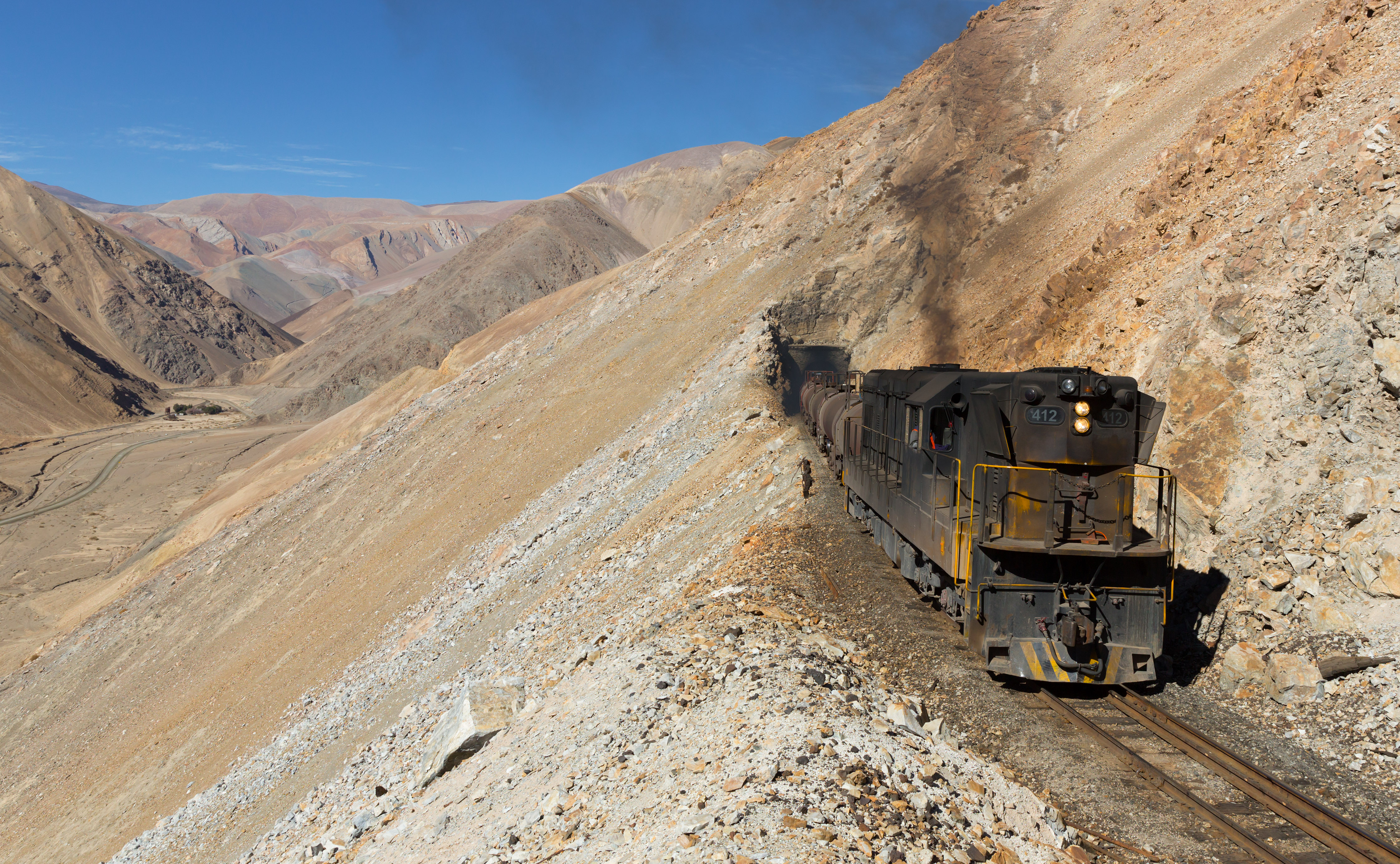
GR12U 412 (one of the engines involved in the 2006 Socompa pass accident) between Montadon and Potrerillos

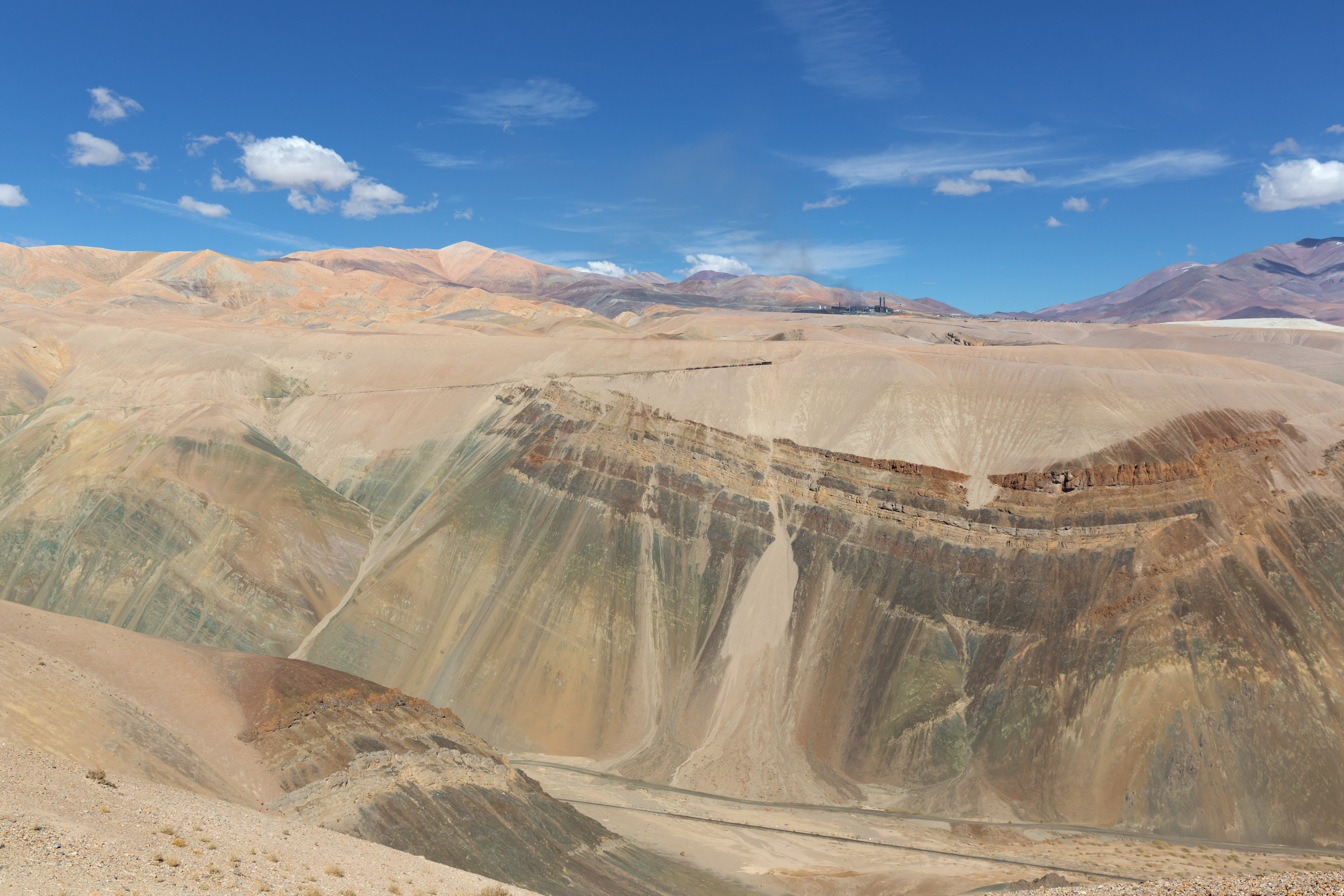
GR12U climbing the grade to Potrerillos (in the background)

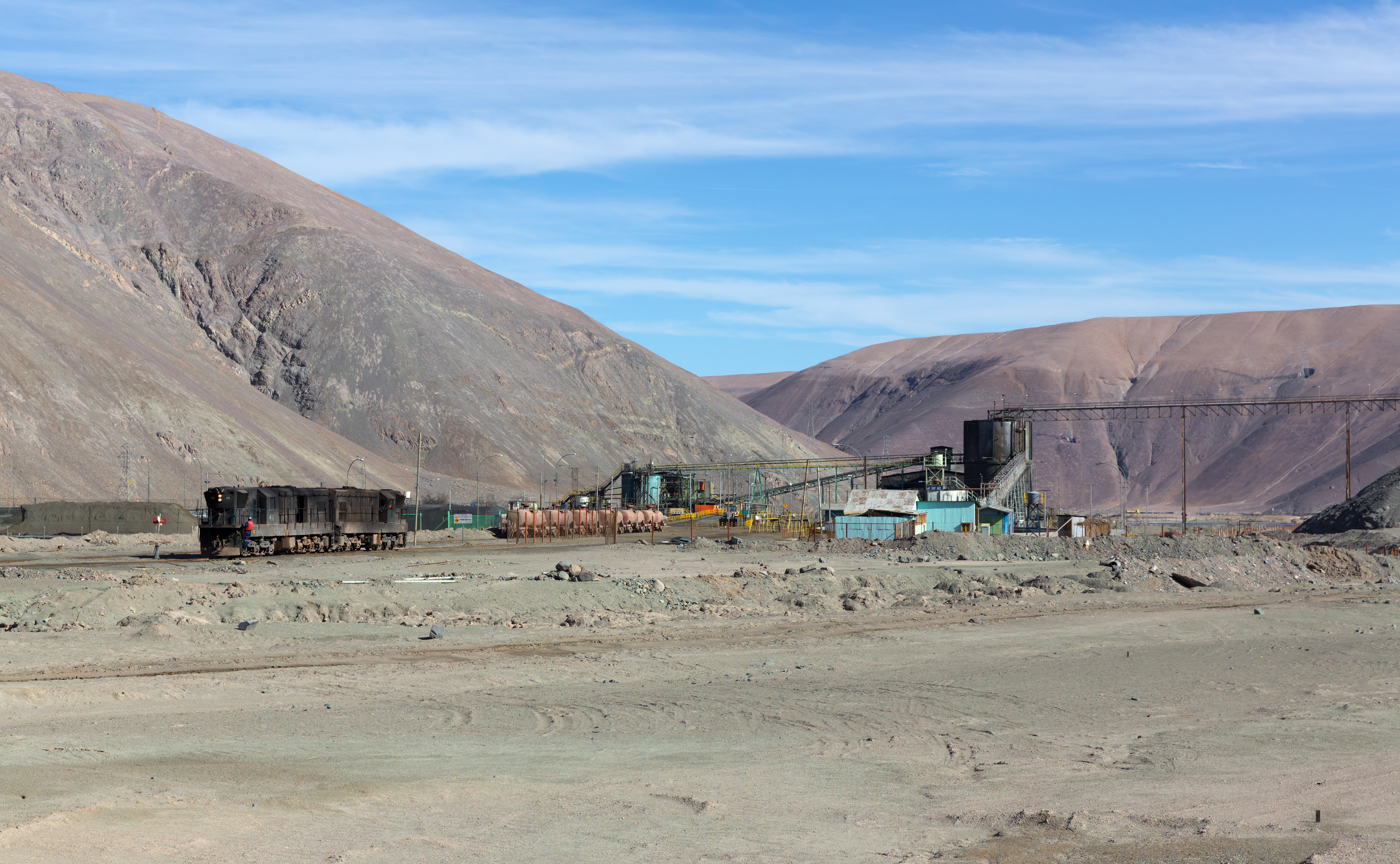
Two GR12U shunting at the filtration plant near Llanta. The pipeline from El Salvador mine is visible on the right.

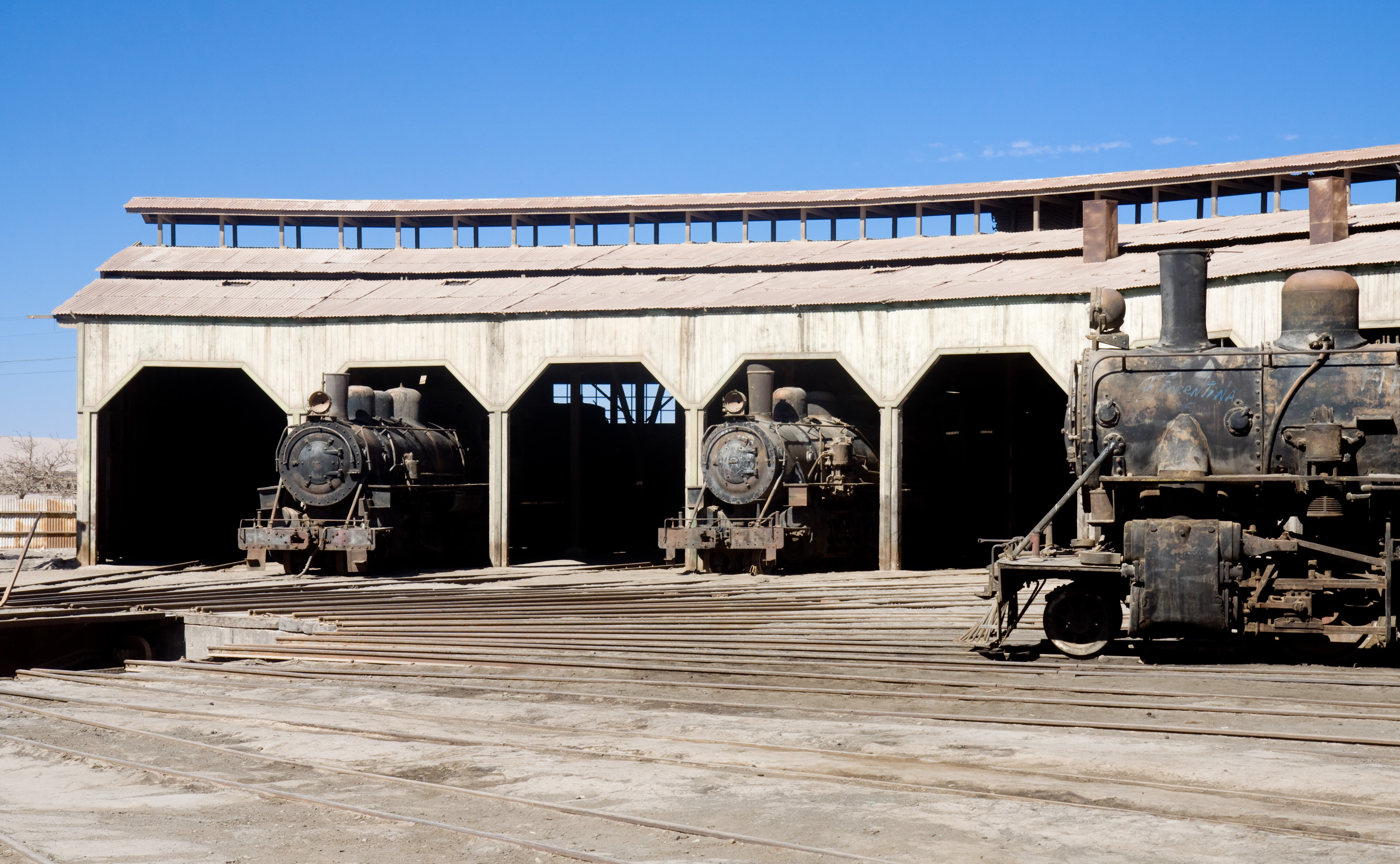
Roundhouse at Baquedano

== See also ==
- La Calera railway station
