= Santiago–Valparaíso railway line =

Railway line in Chile

Santiago–Valparaíso railway line Ferrocarril de Santiago a Valparaíso

Overview
- Locale: Chile
- Termini: Estación Mapocho, Santiago; Estación Puerto, Valparaíso

Service
- System: Empresa de Ferrocarriles del Estado

History
- Opened: 1863

Technical
- Line length: 187 km (116 mi)
- Number of tracks: Single track
- Track gauge: 1,676 mm (5 ft 6 in)

The Santiago–Valparaíso railway is a railway line linking the Chilean capital city Santiago with the port city of Valparaíso.

== History ==
The existing rail line between Santiago and Valparaíso was opened in 1863, and is 187 km (116 mi) long, single-track and designed to avoid steep gradients through mountainous terrain. Passenger service ceased on this line in 1987, and freight traffic almost non-existent since then. Proposals have existed since the 1990s to build a more direct line between the two cities for passengers and freight. The section from Valparaíso to Limache was doubled and put underground in Viña del Mar as part of the Valparaíso Metro.

== Current proposals ==
Proposed routes for a new Santiago–Valparaíso line

A study commissioned by EFE in 2016 outlined three different potential routes for a new Santiago–Valparaíso line, using the Chilean rail network's existing Indian gauge, and cost between US$4–5 billion.

In 2018, a proposal was submitted by the Tren Valparaíso Santiago consortium of local firm Sigdo Koppers and China Railway Engineering Corporation. The US$2.5 billion plan consisted of a 127 km (79 mi) line with four stations to be designed for passenger trains to run at up to 220 km/h (140 mph), offering an end-to-end journey time of 45 min, around half the time currently taken by road. The line would also be suitable for freight trains operating at up to 85 km/h (53 mph).
