= Agua Santa nitrate railway =

Railway line in Chile

Compañía de Salitres y Ferrocarril de Agua Santa
Overview
- Main region: Plains of Northern Antofagasta province
- Dates of operation: 1890–1931/1951

Technical
- Track gauge: 2'6" 76cm
- Track length: 71 km (44 mi)
- No. of tracks: Single
Route map
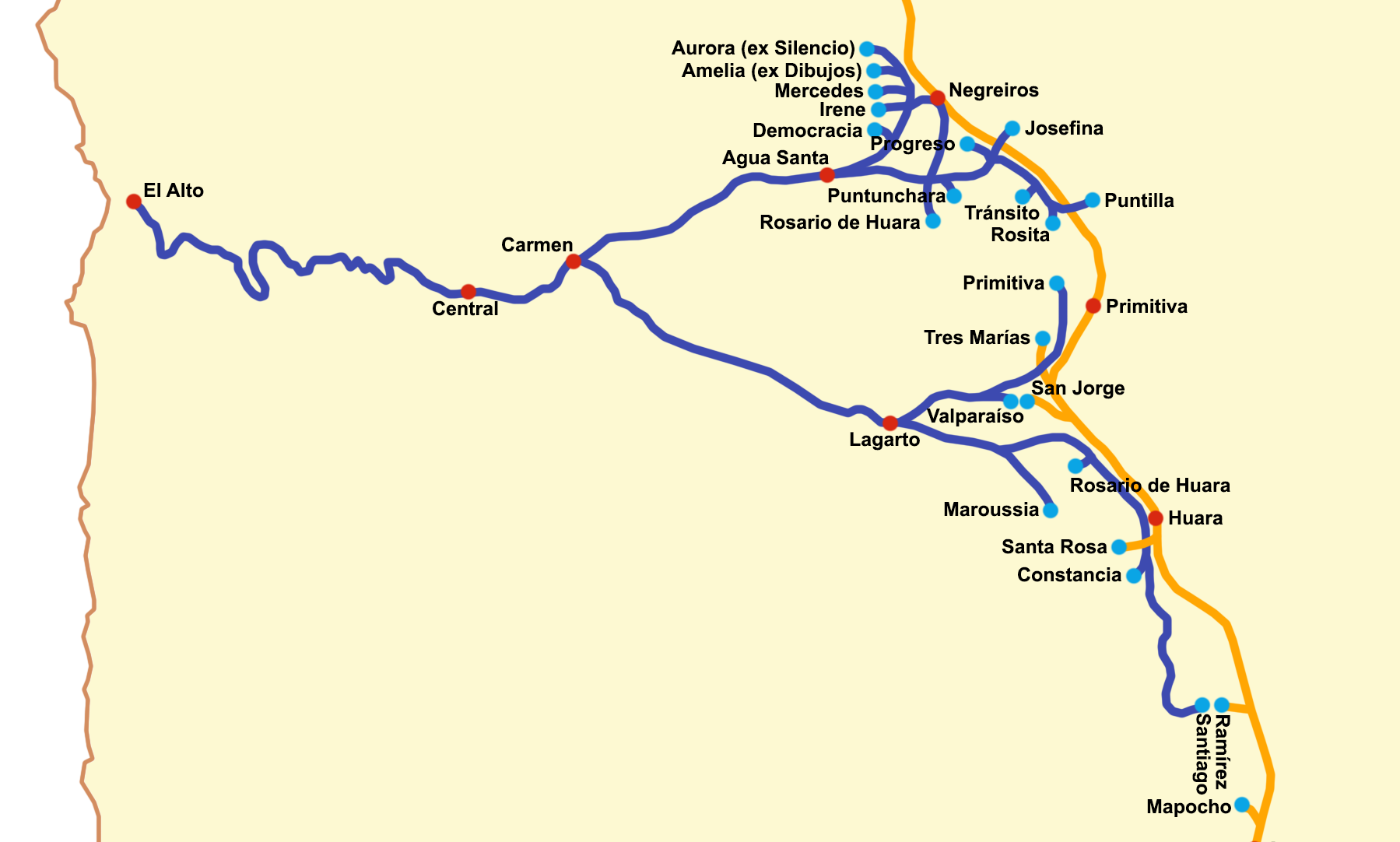

The Ferrocarril de Agua Santa (in English: Agua Santa Railway) was a railway line in the old province of Tarapacá in Chile between 1890 and 1931.

== History ==
As part of the effort to extract nitrate from the Atacama Desert, on 4 December 1889, the Chilean government called for tenders for the construction and concession of a railway between Caleta Buena (a port between Pisagua and Iquique) and the nitrate works around Agua Santa. On 19 March 1890, Joaquín Lira Errázuriz' proposal was accepted. To this end, the Compañía de Salitres y Ferrocarril de Agua Santa was established on 3 November. In addition to the Agua Santa saltpeter works, Abra, Primitiva, Valparaíso and Irene were also served.

The last nail was put in the track, thus completing its first section on 19 September 1890, the very last day of the six-month time limit imposed by the authorities.

The nitrate was brought down from the plains down to the port using inclined planes.

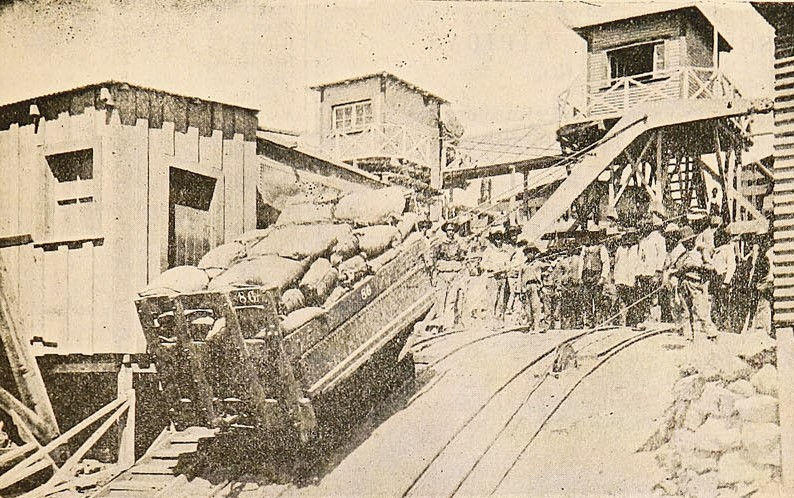
Planos inclinados a Caleta Buena, Sucesos, 1902-09-13 (4)

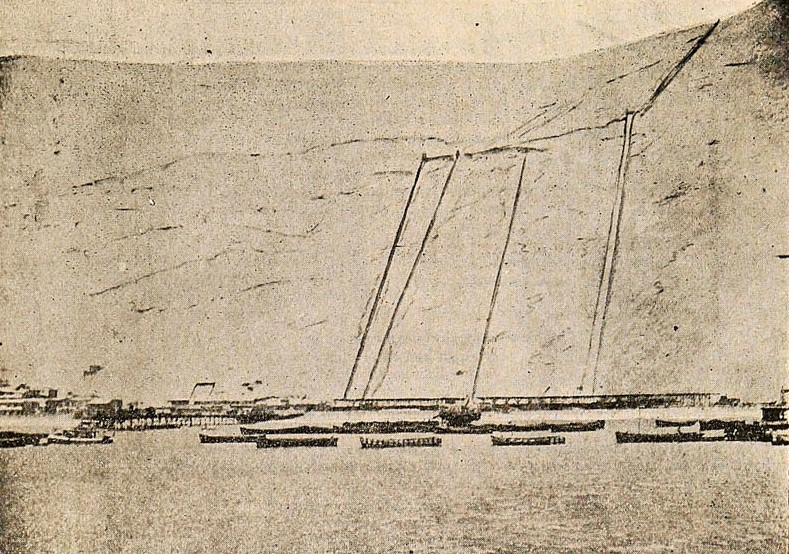
Vista general de los planos inclinados de Caleta Buena, Sucesos, 1902-09-13 (4)

On 30 January 1892, the construction of branches to the Rosario, Mercedes and Progreso works were authorized and in September 1893 to Huara.

Around 1896, further branches connected the Puntunchara, Rosario de Huara, Constancia, Progreso, Josefina, Tránsito, Aurora, Amelia, Slavia, Valparaíso, Democracia, Jazpampa, Pacha, Aguada, Angela, Sacramento, San Jorge and Tres Marías works.

In May 1907 a branch was laid to Negreiros station.

In September 1915, in accordance with the terms of the concession as granted in 1889, the track and rolling stock passed into the ownership of the state. The Compañía de Salitres y Ferrocarril de Agua Santa signed a lease to continue using the system.

In 1931 the Ferrocarril de Agua Santa ceased operations, and five years later the nitrate works of the same name also ended its production. In 1935 part of the track was lifted. In 1940 floods destroyed part of the route that was still intact. Some of the remaining infrastructure was transferred to the Iquique – Pintados Railway in 1941, which later leased it to the Compañía Salitrera de Tarapacá y Antofagasta, which in turn operated the tracks until 7 December 1951, when decree 2432 authorized their early return and the lifting of the tracks.

== Alignment ==
Santiago Marín Vicuña described in 1916 the railway line with a trunk route that went from Caleta Buena to Negreiros, and a branch to Huara. The distances on the branch to Huara are measured taking Caleta Buena as km0.

Station	km	Altitude (m)
Main line
Caleta Buena	0	741
Central	22	978
Carmen	29	1105
Agua Santa	42	1176
Negreiros	46	1146
Huara branch
Lagarto	42	1176
Rosario	50	1119
Huara	54	1107
