= Satellite city =

Smaller municipality that is inside of or adjacent to a larger major city

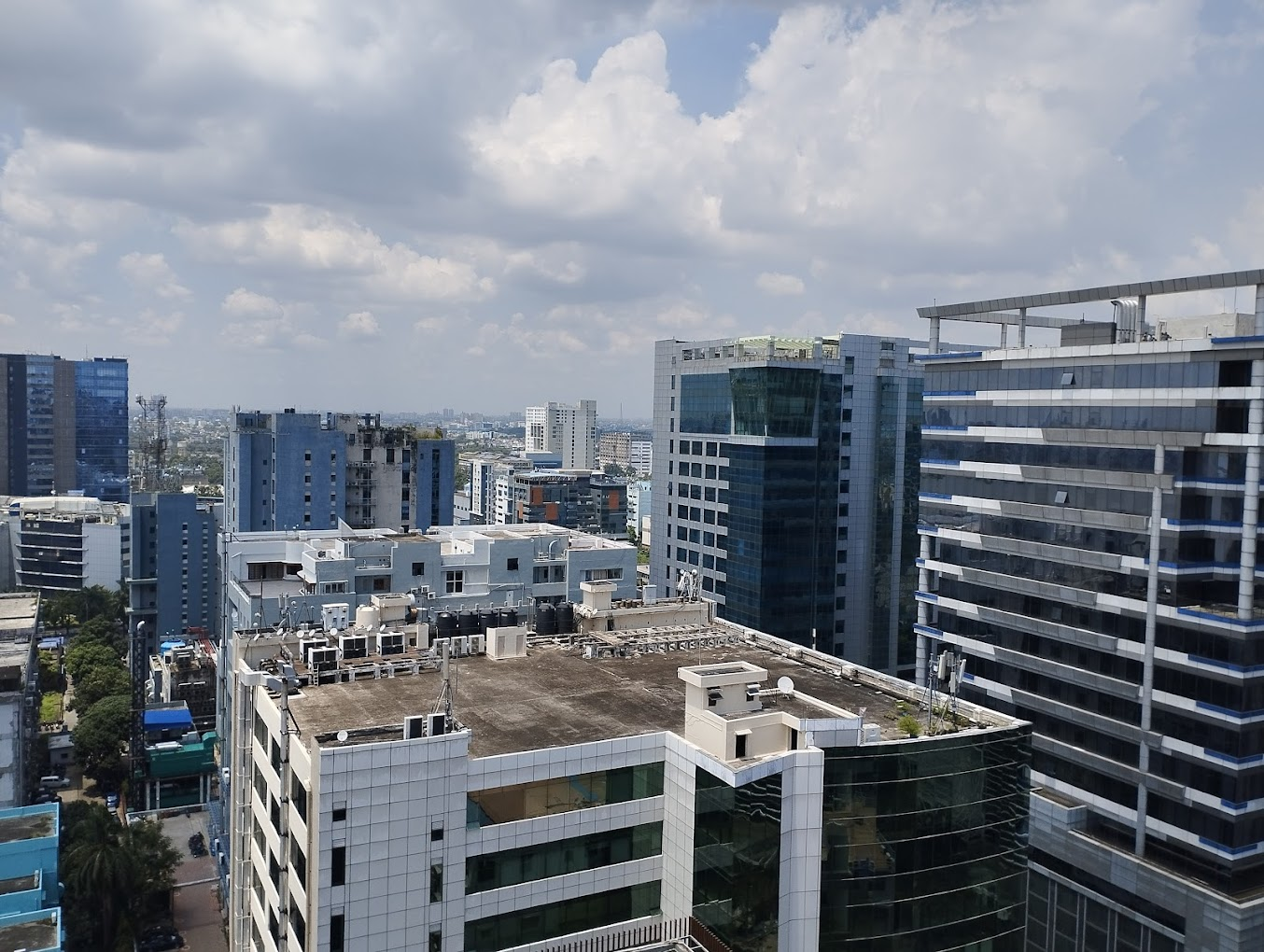
Bidhannagar (Salt Lake City) is a satellite city of Kolkata with over 670,000 residents.

A satellite city, satellite town, or satellite village is a smaller municipality or settlement that is part of (or on the edge of) a larger metropolitan area and serves as a regional population and employment center. It differs from suburbs, subdivisions and especially bedroom communities in that it has employment bases sufficient to support its residential population, and conceptually, could be a self-sufficient community outside of its larger metropolitan area. However, it functions as part of a metropolis and experiences high levels of cross-commuting (that is, residents commuting out of and employees commuting into the city).

== See also ==
General

Edge city

- New Urbanism
- Rural flight
- Satellite village
- Urban area
- Urban sprawl

Planning

- Regional planning
- Spatial planning

Lists

- List of United States urban areas
- Category:Satellite cities

== External articles ==
- Graham Romeyn Taylor, Satellite Cities. A Study of Industrial Suburbs. ISBN 1-4021-6188-3
- Berger, A. S. (1978). The city: urban communities and their problems. Dubuque, Iowa: Brown.
- Carpenter, N. (1931). The sociology of city life. Longmans' social science series. New York: Longmans, Green and Co.
