= Temuco Train Station =

Chilean train station

Temuco Station Estación Temuco
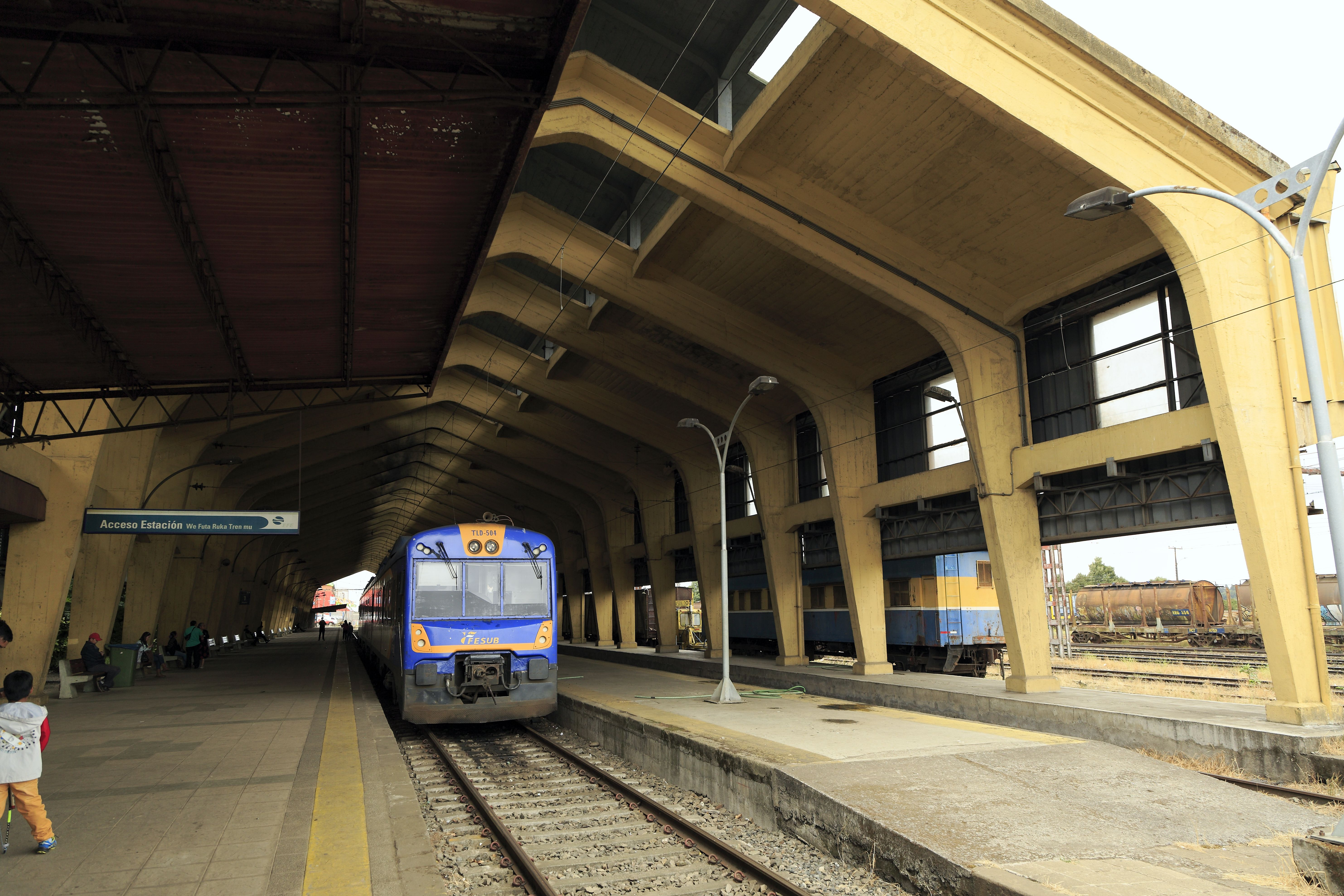

General information
- Location: Av. Barros Arana 191; Chile
- Coordinates: 38°44′13″S 72°34′44″W
- Operated by: EFE Empresa de Ferrocariles del Estado

Construction
- Structure type: At-grade

History
- Opened: 1893
Location

The Temuco Train Station is a train station in Temuco, in the region of Araucanía in Chile. It is operated by EFE and is currently the terminus station for the Pitrufquén-Temuco and Victoria-Temuco Services. It was inaugurated in 1893. EFE currently operates the only scheduled routes in the station with the Tren Araucanía service between 2 sections: Victoria to Temuco with a length of 65km and Pitrufquén to Temuco, inaugurated in 2023 with a length of 29.9 km.
