= Satellite village =

Type of village

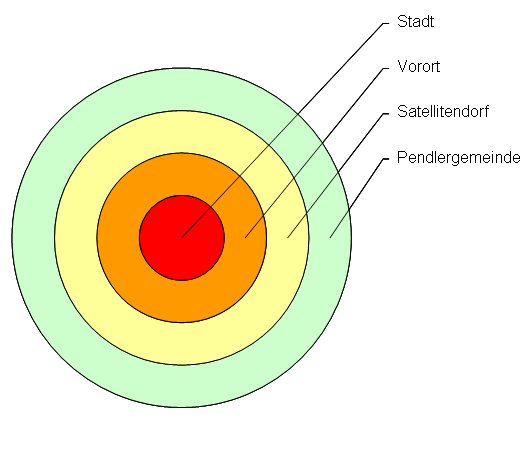
Abgrenzung Satellitendorf

A satellite village is a term for one or more settlements that have arisen within the outskirts of a larger one. Normally people would live in a satellite village, while they worked in the city.

== See also ==
- Satellite city
- Commuter town
