= Valparaíso Metro =

Railway system on Valparaíso Region, Chile

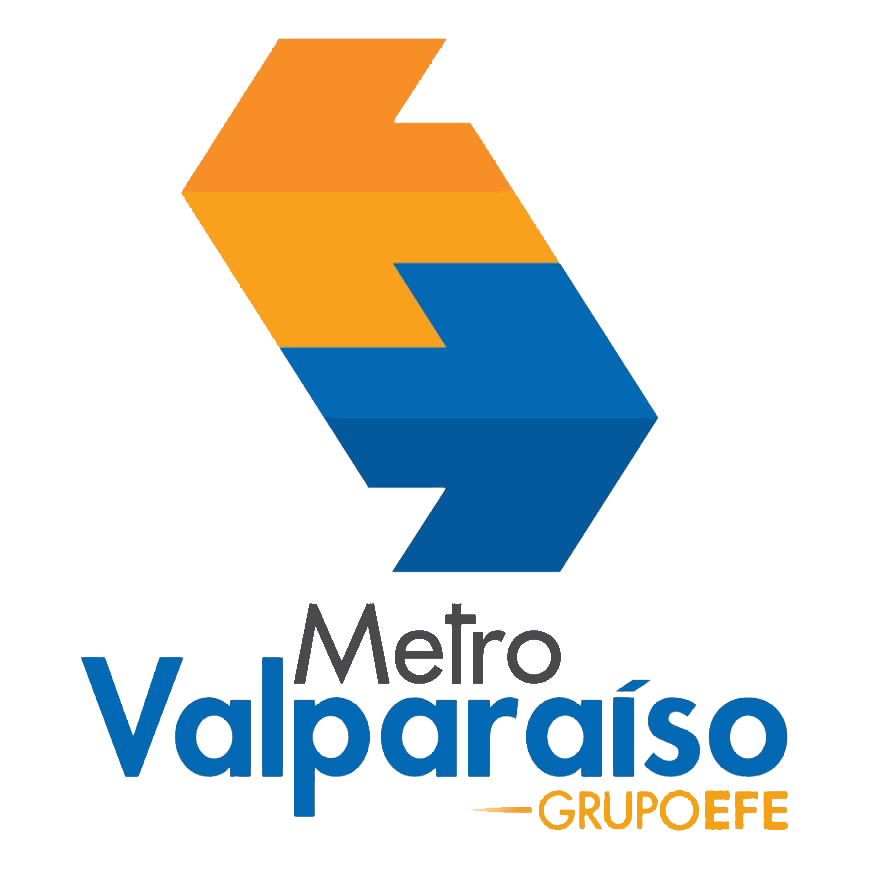

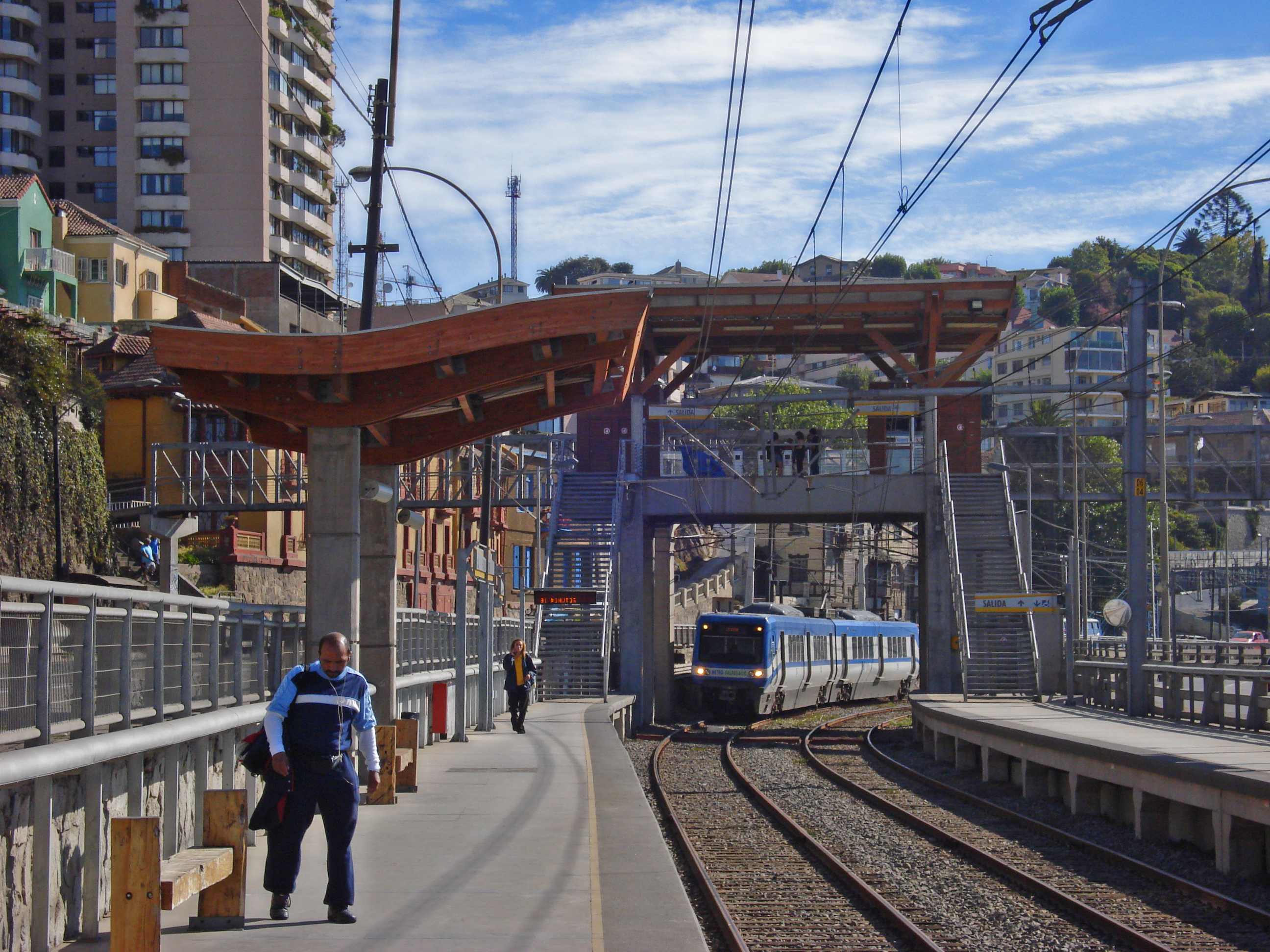
- Train to Limache entering Recreo

Overview
- Native name: Metro Valparaíso
- Locale: Gran Valparaíso, Chile
- Transit type: Commuter rail
- Number of lines: 1
- Number of stations: 20
- Annual ridership: 20.2 million (2019)

Operation
- Began operation: November 23, 2005
- Operator: Metro Valparaíso
- Character: Mostly at-grade, with an underground section
- Headway: 6–12 minutes

Technical
- System length: 43 km (27 mi)
- Track gauge: 1,676 mm (5 ft 6 in)
- Electrification: 3 kV DC from overhead catenary

The Limache-Puerto train service (Previously known as the Valparaíso Metro (Spanish: Metro Valparaíso), and colloquially known as "Merval") is the commuter rail system serving the urban conurbation of Gran Valparaíso, Chile. It consists of one line, 43 kilometres (27 mi) long, serving 20 stations, connecting the cities of Valparaíso, Viña del Mar, Quilpué, Villa Alemana, and Limache (outside the Valparaíso conurbation).

It is administered by EFE Valparaíso S.A., a subsidiary of the Chilean state-owned train company Empresa de los Ferrocarriles del Estado. The Limache-Puerto service began with the conversion of an interurban service on the Santiago–Valparaíso railway line into more rapid transit-like service in 2005 – the renovated line was inaugurated on November 23, 2005 and began service the following day. The Limache-Puerto service carried 20.17 million passengers in 2019.

Together with the much larger Santiago Metro, it is one of the only two underground urban rail systems in Chile (the Limache-Puerto service has a 5-kilometre (3.1 mi) underground stretch from Miramar through Chorrillos stations in Viña del Mar). However, it is not a full metro system due to the existence of various level crossings and the long distances between stations. As a result of the presence of at-grade level crossings and regional rail character, the Limache-Puerto service is more analogous to a commuter rail system.

Studies are being done to assess the feasibility of extending the line farther inland along the Valparaíso-Santiago Railway to serve the towns of Quillota, La Cruz, and La Calera which are currently being served by intercity buses (Bus+Metro services) that feed into Limache Station. In addition, passenger and freight service between Valparaíso and Santiago is proposed to use the line.

== History ==
Valparaíso had an interurban passenger train system since the 19th century. In 1999 construction began on the current system, rebuilding the old interurban stations and building new ones with a homologous design. In Viña del Mar, a tunnel over 5-kilometre (3.1 mi) long was constructed. New trains arrived in Chile on February 22, 2005 and the old system was decommissioned on June 30 that year, in favour of the new Limache-Puerto service service.

On May 29, 2019, basic engineering studies were awarded to the CDI and Consultrans consortia, with a deadline of 3 years for execution to extend the Valparaiso Metro towards La Calera. In parallel, the project is already being submitted for environmental impact studies, aiming to start construction in 2023 and ultimately begin operations in 2027. Its future stations will be San Pedro, Quillota Sur, Quillota Centro, La Cruz, Guerra, and La Calera. However, new reports indicate that construction would begin in 2025 and be completed in 2028.

During the start of September 2020 the design of the Valencia station was finalized, with construction confirmed to start soon after.

By May of 2022 the bidding process for the station's construction had begun. On August 5 of the same year the construction work began, with an estimated construction time of 18 months costing 10 billion pesos, expecting for the opening date to be around the end of 2023 or during 2024. However, construction has been slow due to the effects of having to build the new station with the service continuing as usual (and going through the construction site), causing the opening date to be pushed to the second semester of 2025, tentatively.

== Architecture ==
Between Puerto and Recreo the line runs at street level, bordering the coast, parallel to Errázuriz and España Avenues. It descends into the tunnel below Viana and Álvarez Avenues, with four underground stations. The line leaves the tunnel at the industrial area of El Salto and continues along a winding path to the inner metropolitan area.

== Stations ==
| Trazado | Station | Inauguration Date | Location | Comuna (Borough) |
|---|---|---|---|---|
| Tramo 1 Valparaíso | Puerto | November 23, 2005 | Errázuriz Avenue and Sotomayor Square | Valparaíso |
| Tramo 1 Valparaíso | Bellavista | November 23, 2005 | Errázuriz Avenue and Pudeto | Valparaíso |
| Tramo 1 Valparaíso | Francia | November 23, 2005 | Errázuriz Avenue and Francia | Valparaíso |
| Tramo 1 Valparaíso | Barón | November 23, 2005 | Errázuriz Avenue and Argentina | Valparaíso |
| Tramo 1 Valparaíso | Portales | November 23, 2005 | Av. España and Pellé | Valparaíso |
| Tramo 2 Viña del Mar | Recreo | November 23, 2005 | Av. España and Covadonga | Viña del Mar |
| Tramo 2 Viña del Mar | Miramar | November 23, 2005 | Álvarez and Von Schroeders | Viña del Mar |
| Tramo 2 Viña del Mar | Viña del Mar | November 23, 2005 | Álvarez and Eduardo Grove Square | Viña del Mar |
| Tramo 2 Viña del Mar | Hospital | November 23, 2005 | Álvarez and Simón Bolívar | Viña del Mar |
| Tramo 2 Viña del Mar | Chorrillos | November 23, 2005 | Álvarez and Lusitania | Viña del Mar |
| Tramo 2 Viña del Mar | El Salto | November 23, 2005 | 3250 Limache Avenue | Viña del Mar |
| Tramo 3 Quilpué | Valencia | c. 2024 | Condell Sur Avenue and Pasaje Once | Quilpué |
| Tramo 3 Quilpué | Quilpué | November 23, 2005 | Condell Sur Avenue and Vicuña Mackenna | Quilpué |
| Tramo 3 Quilpué | El Sol | November 23, 2005 | Baquedano Avenue and Aviador Acevedo | Quilpué |
| Tramo 3 Quilpué | El Belloto | November 23, 2005 | Aviador Acevedo and Gómez Carreño | Quilpué |
| Tramo 4 Villa Alemana | Las Américas | November 23, 2005 | Berlín/Ibáñez and Las Américas | Villa Alemana |
| Tramo 4 Villa Alemana | La Concepción | November 23, 2005 | Berlín/Ibáñez and Pudeto | Villa Alemana |
| Tramo 4 Villa Alemana | Villa Alemana | November 23, 2005 | Berlín and Armando La Torre | Villa Alemana |
| Tramo 4 Villa Alemana | Sargento Aldea | November 23, 2005 | Domingo Composto and Togo | Villa Alemana |
| Tramo 4 Villa Alemana | Peñablanca | November 23, 2005 | Sargento Aldea and Presidente Montt | Villa Alemana |
| Tramo 5 Limache | Limache | November 23, 2005 | Arturo Prat and José Tomás Urmeneta | Limache |
| Tramo 6 Future extension | San Pedro | c. 2027 | TBC | Quillota |
| Tramo 6 Future extension | Quillota Sur | c. 2027 | TBC | Quillota |
| Tramo 6 Future extension | Quillota Centro | c. 2027 | TBC | Quillota |
| Tramo 6 Future extension | La Cruz | c. 2027 | TBC | La Cruz |
| Tramo 6 Future extension | Guerra | c. 2027 | TBC | La Calera |
| Tramo 6 Future extension | La Calera | c. 2027 | TBC | La Calera |

== Fleet and operations ==
Valparaiso Metro has a fleet of 35 trains; 27 single-deck multiple-car X'Trapolis 100 train sets manufactured by Alstom, France operate the service, in a blue and white livery and 8 single-deck multiple-car X'Trapolis Modular train sets manufactured by Alstom, in Barcelona.

Services operate 06:30-22:30 on weekdays; 07:30-22.30 on Saturday, and 08:00-22:15 on Sunday and public holidays. Services between Puerto and Sargento Aldea are most frequent, at 6-minute frequencies, with 12-minute frequencies elsewhere, 12 minutes on weekends and public holidays.

== Ticketing and fares ==
Route map

To access the services of Metro Valparaiso the only means of payment is the Metroval card, a smart contactless card, costing CLP$1,350 (US$2.05) in May 2016 and sold at all stations. The card can be loaded in all ticket offices with cash or Redcompra; the minimum charge for general users is $300 and $1,000 to use Redcompra, all loads must be multiples of $100. It is scanned both entering and leaving stations since fares depend on the length of the journey and the time of day. There are five Zones and three time-of-day fares. Tickets cost from CLP$410 (US$0.62) in low-usage hours within Zone 1 (T1) to CLP$864 (US$1.31) in rush-hour travelling through five zones, for example from Valparaíso to Limache. The service "Bus + Metro" in the Limache Station to the cities of Limache Viejo, Olmué, Quillota and La Calera cost between CLP$787(US$1.19) and CLP$1460 (US$2.22).

There are concession cards for students, senior citizens, disabled or handicapped people and tourists (This card allows unlimited travel on the day of acquisition and cost CLP$2.360 or US$3.58), Children below one metre in height travel for free.

Customer services and information offices are in 3 stations; Viña del Mar, Puerto and Limache.

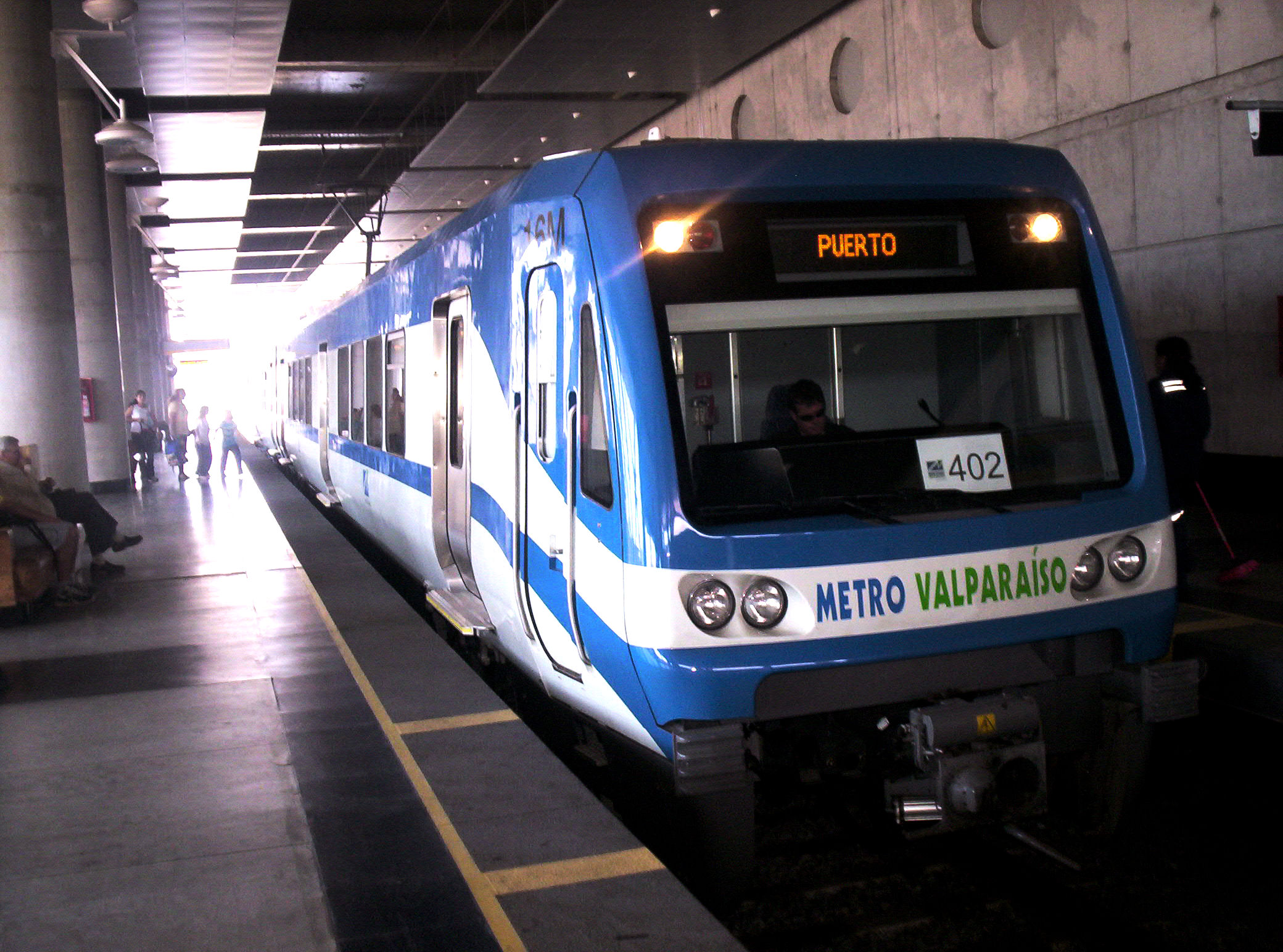
X'Trapolis 100 train at Puerto

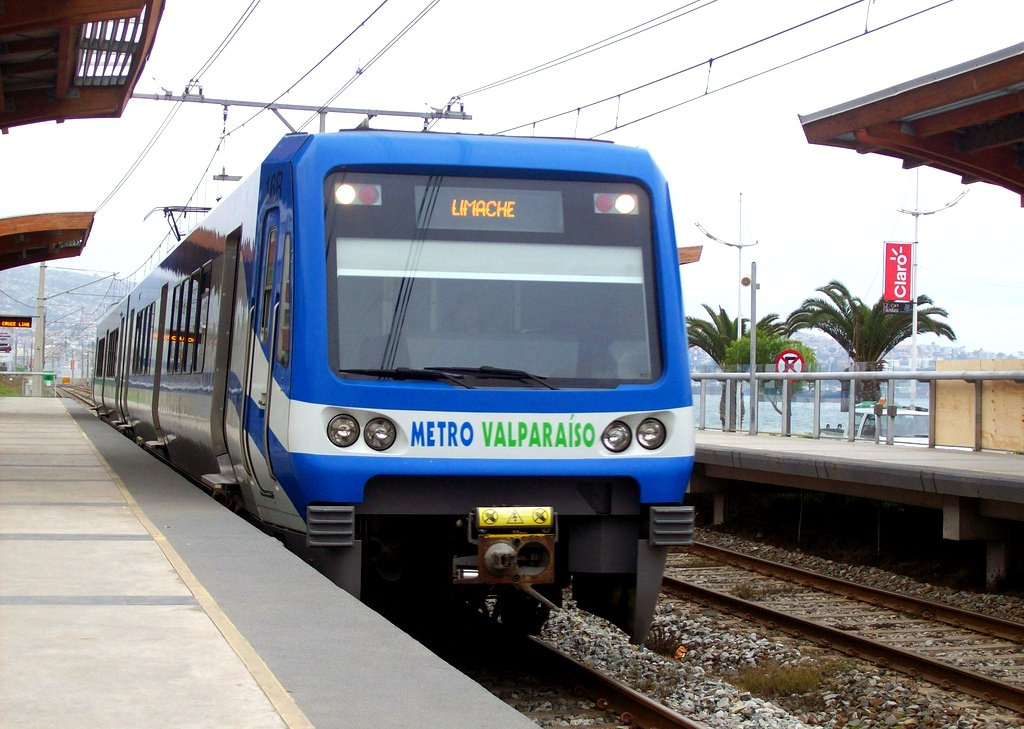
Outbound unit at Caleta Portales

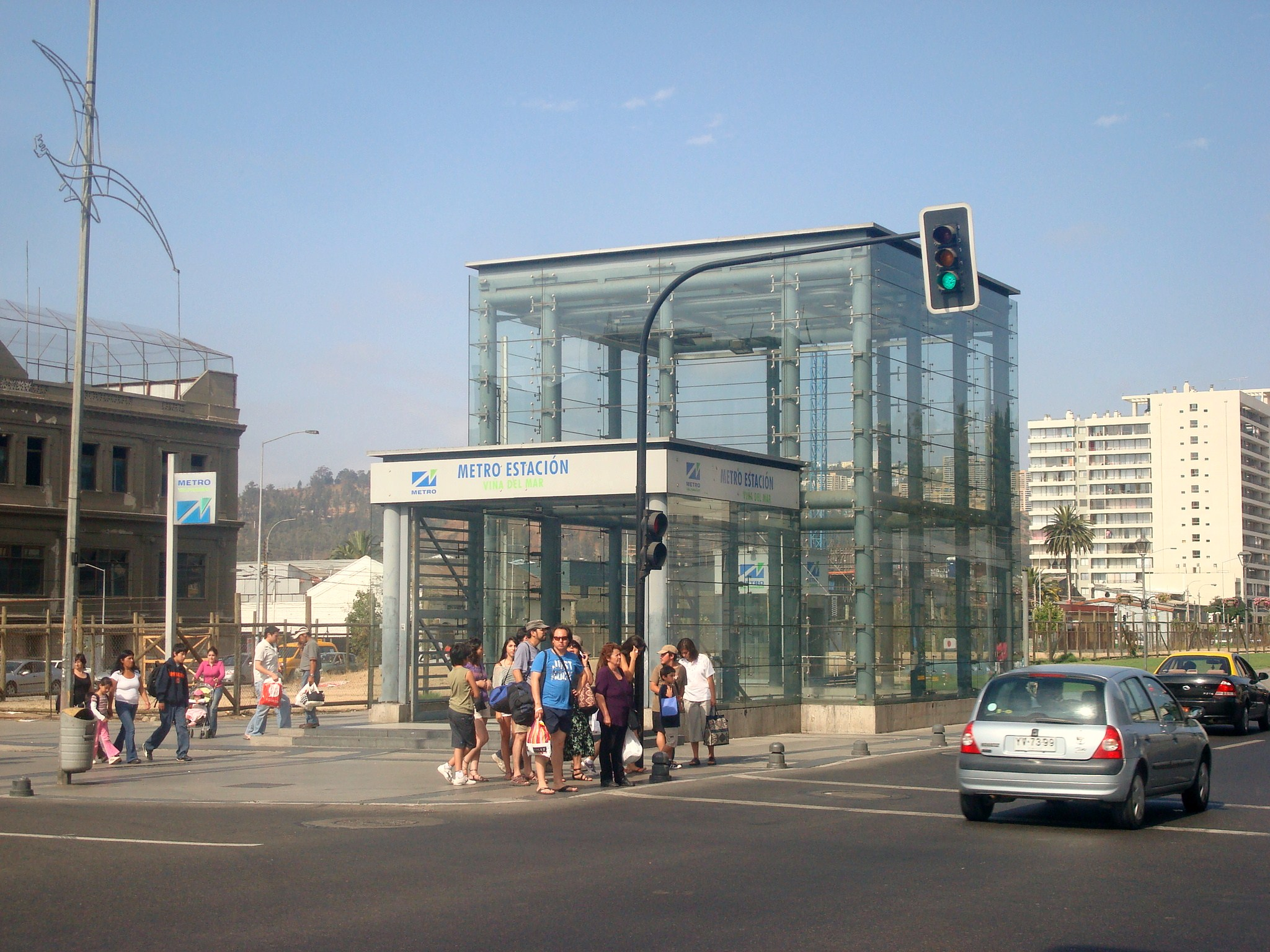
Viña del Mar station

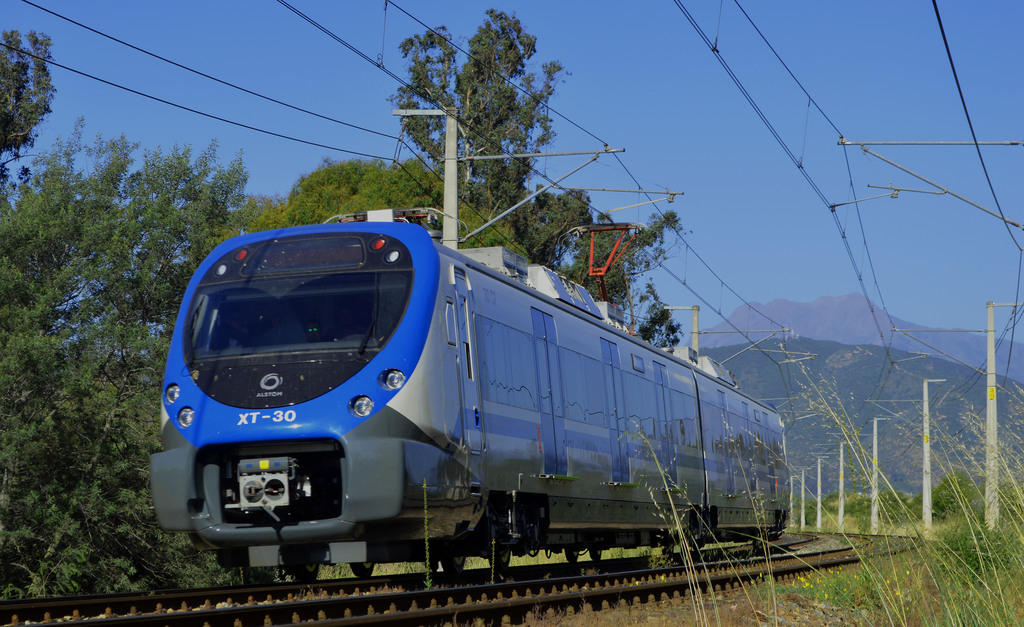
An X'Trapolis Modular unit

== See also ==
- List of Limache-Puerto service stations
- Santiago–Valparaíso railway line
- Funicular railways of Valparaíso
- Trolleybuses in Valparaíso
- Transantiago
