= Puerto Montt - La Paloma station =

Railway station in Puerto Montt, Chile

La Paloma Station Estación La Paloma
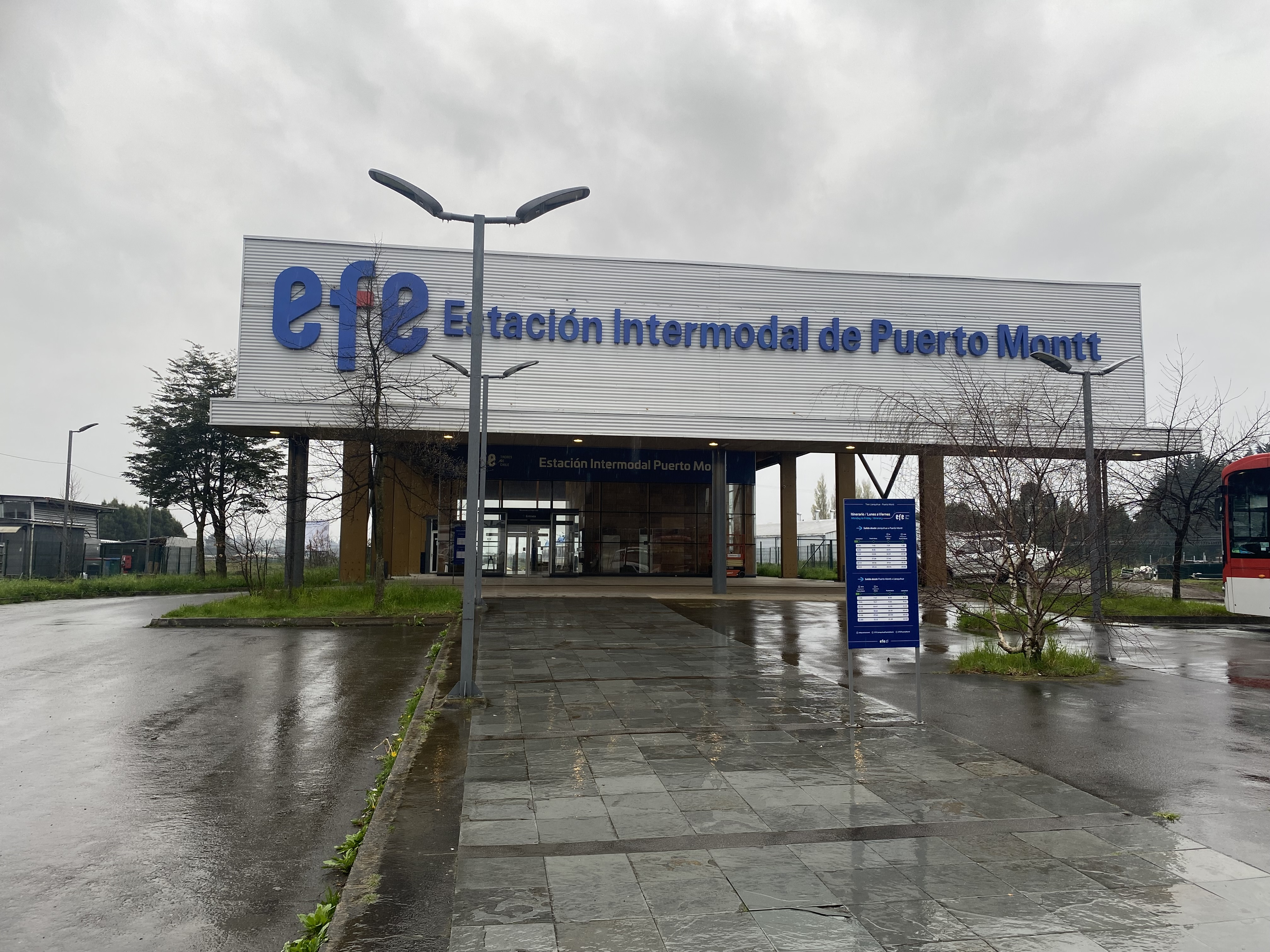

General information
- Location: Cuarta Terraza Avenue, Puerto Montt, Chile
- Coordinates: 41°27′31″S 72°55′03″W
- Operator: Empresa de los Ferrocarriles del Estado
- Line: Llanquihue - Puerto Montt

Construction
- Structure type: At-grade

History
- Opened: 2005
- Closed: 2007
- Rebuilt: 2025
Location

Puerto Montt-La Paloma station, commonly referred to as La Paloma Station, is a Train Station located in Puerto Montt, Chile. It is the terminal station of the Tren Llanquihue - Puerto Montt Service. It was originally opened in 2005, then closed in 2007. After undergoing renovation work, it was reopened in early 2025.
