= Puerto Varas =

- City and Commune
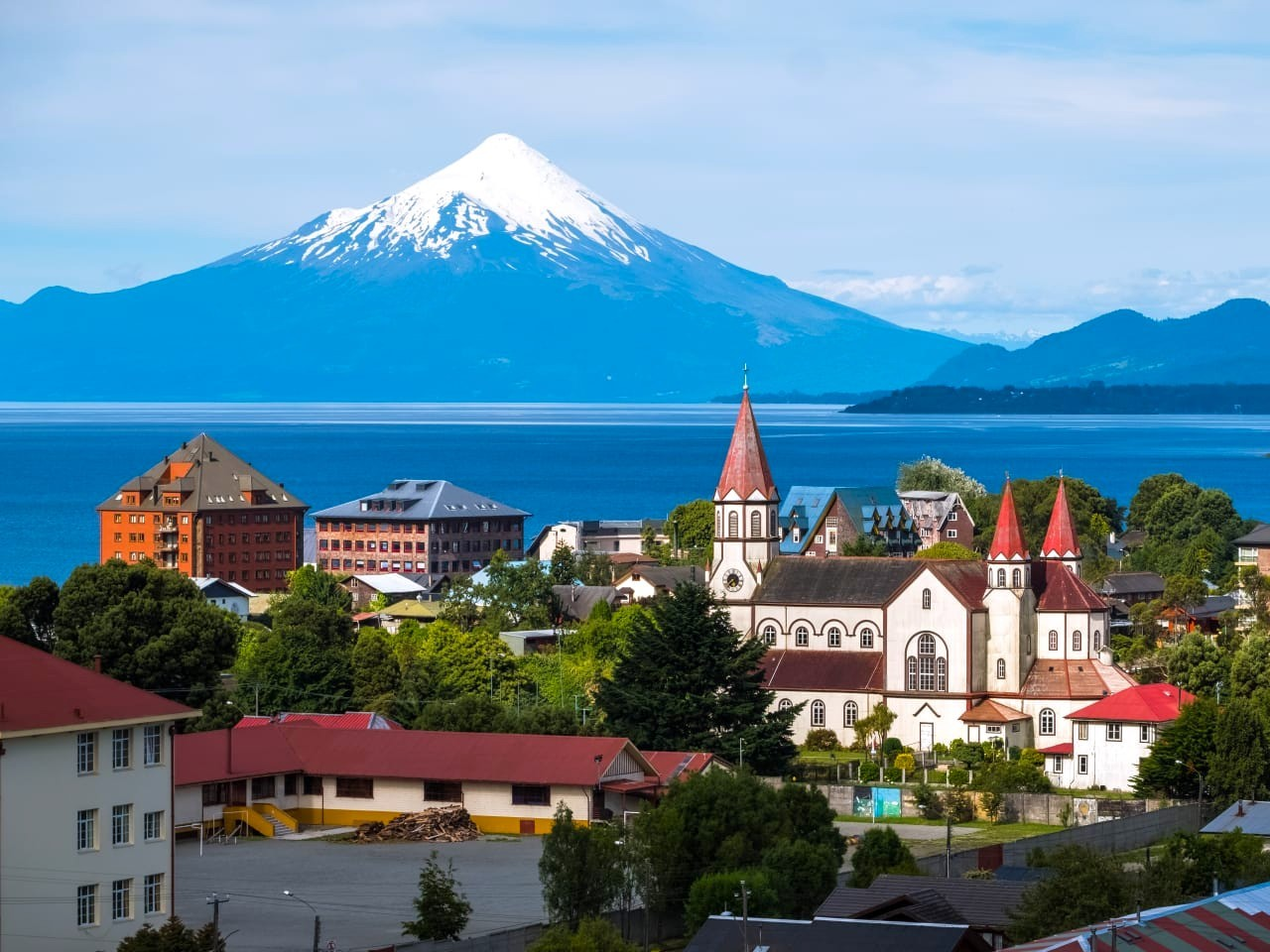
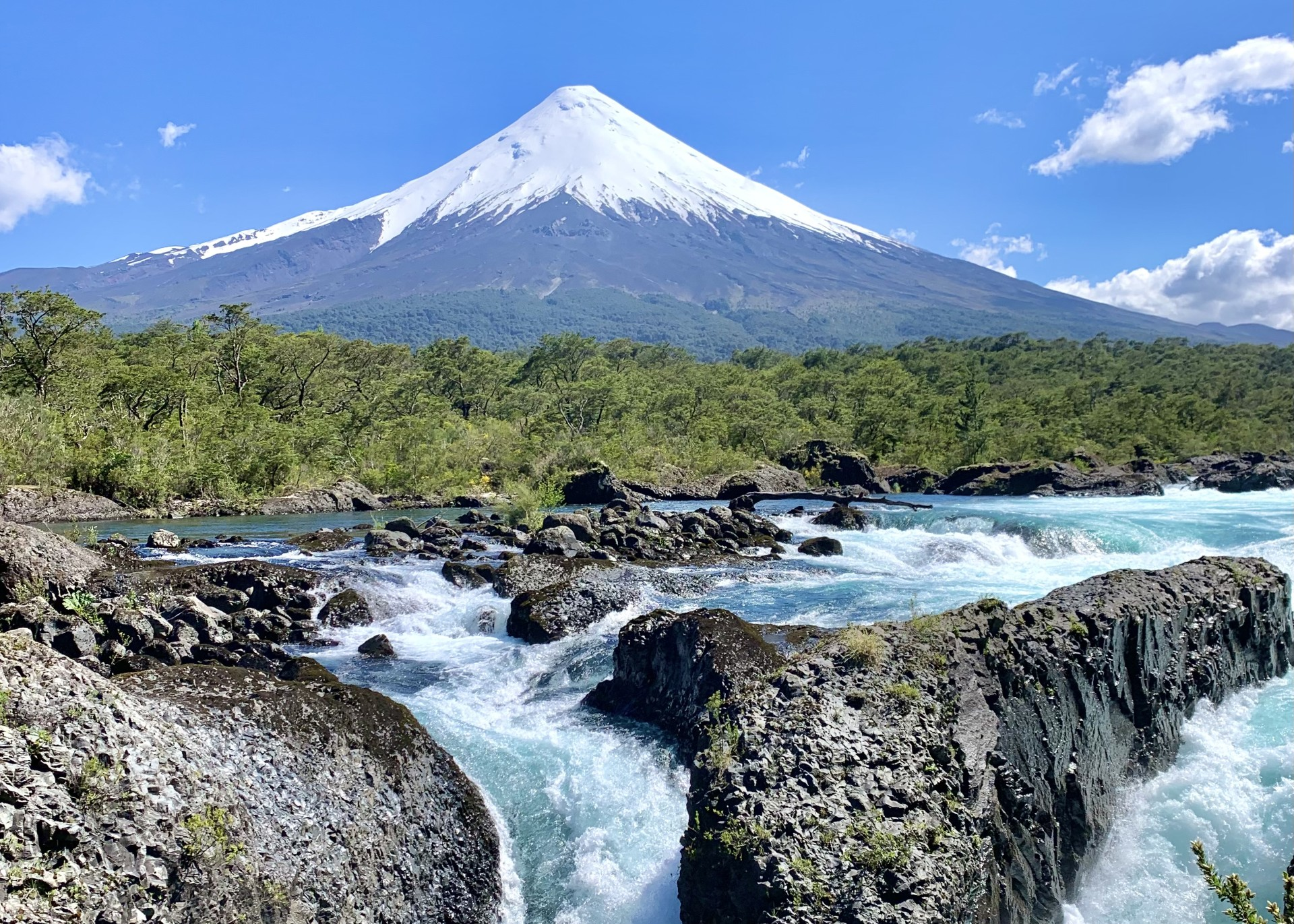
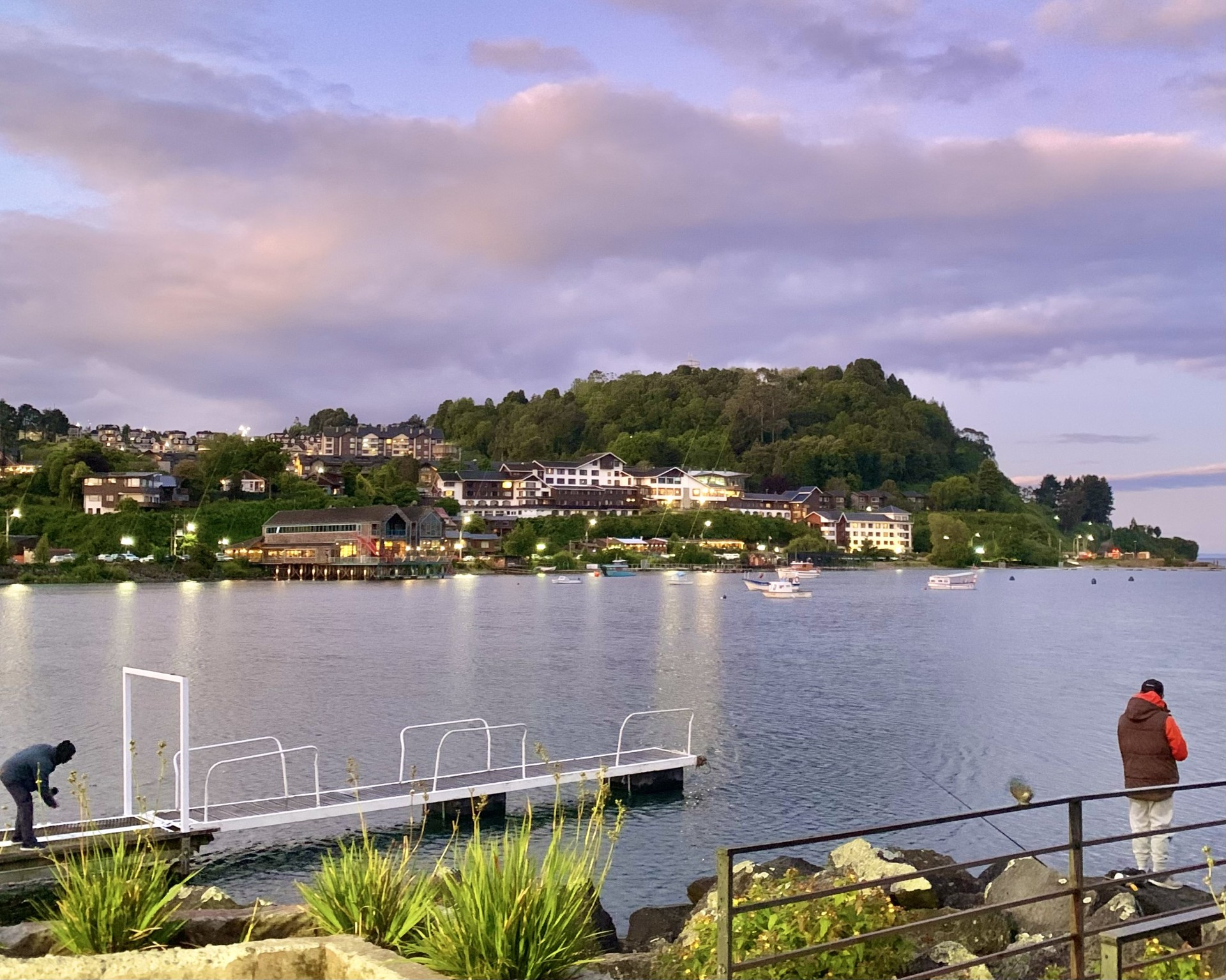
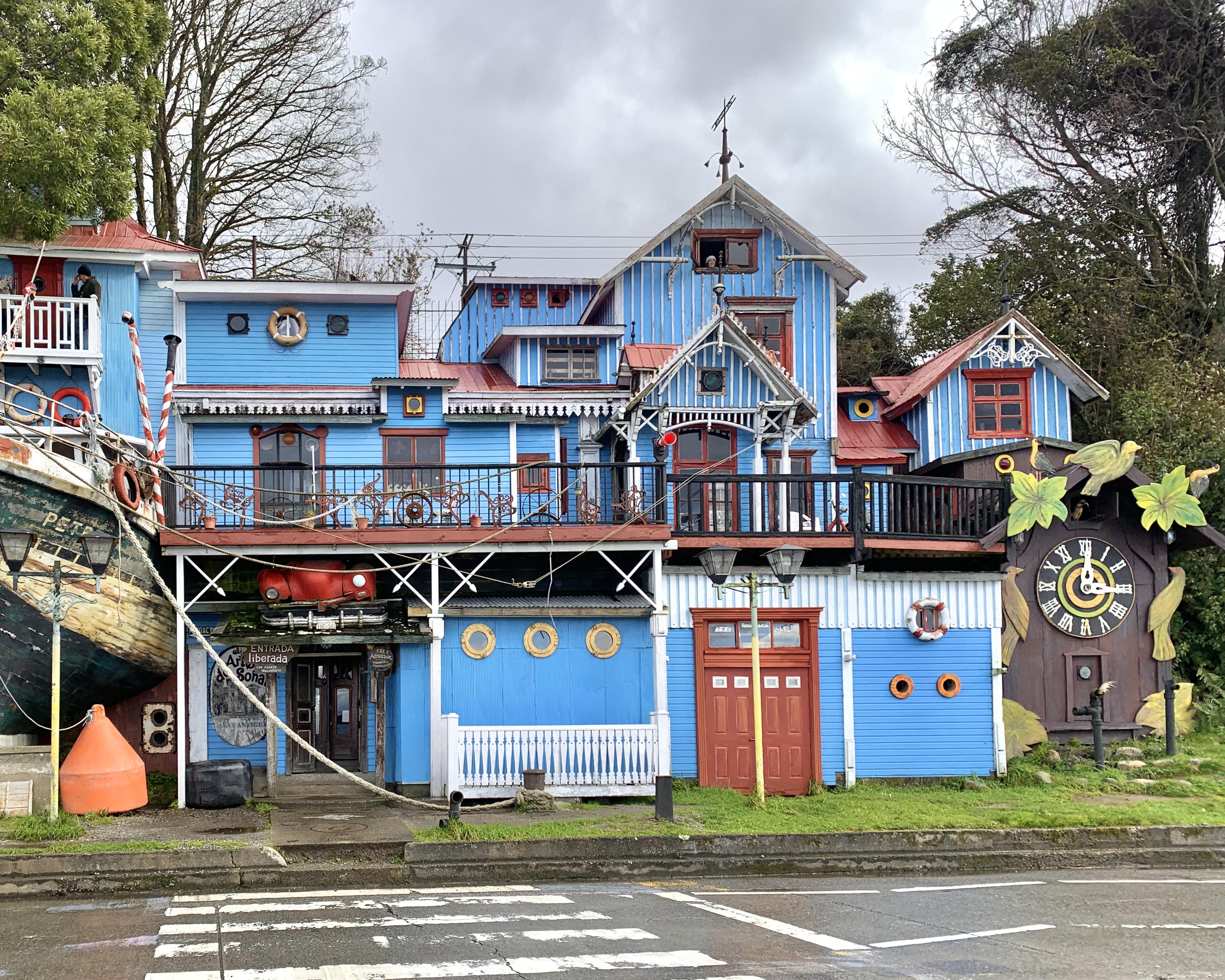
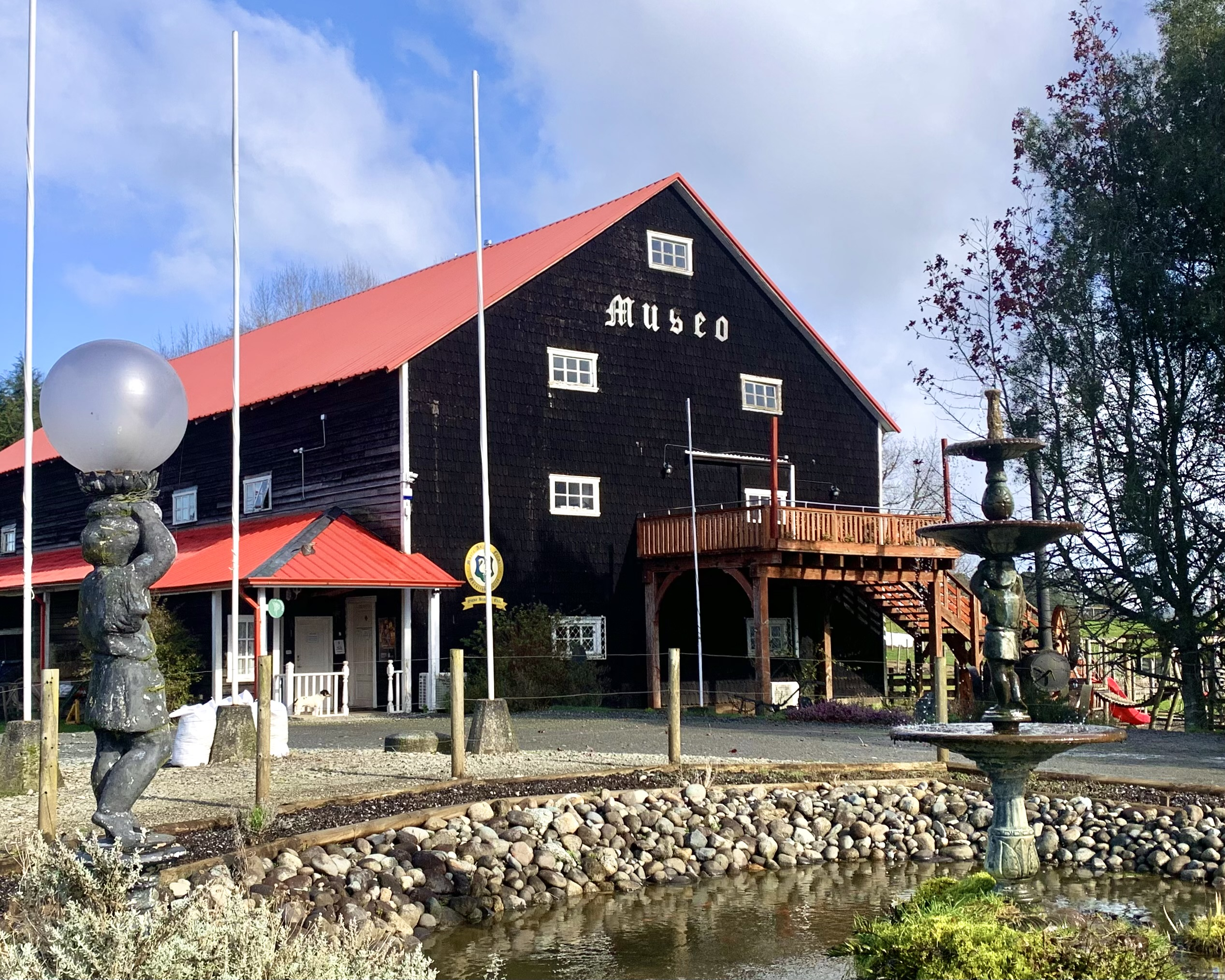
- View of Puerto Varas with Osorno Volcano and Llanquihue Lake in the background Petrohue Waterfalls in Vicente Perez Rosales National Park View of Philippi Hill park from city waterfront Pablo Fierro Museum Antonio Felmer Museum

- Flag Coat of arms Location of Puerto Varas commune in Los Lagos Region Location in Chile
- Nickname(s): The City of Roses, Tourist Capital of Southern Chile
- Coordinates: 41°19′S 72°59′W
- Country: Chile
- Region: Los Lagos
- Province: Llanquihue
- Founded as: Puerto Varas
- Founded: 12 February 1854
- Named for: Antonio Varas

Government
  - Type: Municipality
  - Alcalde: Tomás Garate Silva

Area
  - Total: 4,064.9 km^{2} (1,569.5 sq mi)

Population (2012 Census)
  - Total: 37,561
  - Density: 9.2403/km^{2} (23.932/sq mi)
  - Urban: 24,309
  - Rural: 8,603
- Demonym(s): Puertovarino, portovarino, -a

Sex
  - Men: 16,645
  - Women: 16,267
- Time zone: UTC−4 (CLT)
  - Summer (DST): UTC−3 (CLST)
- Area code: 56 + 65
- Website: www.ptovaras.cl (in Spanish)

Puerto Varas, also known as "La Ciudad de Las Rosas" or "The City Of Roses", is a city and commune located in the southern Chilean province of Llanquihue, in the Los Lagos Region.

The city is famous for its German traditions, its natural environment, and its popularity as a tourist destination. It enjoys a scenic location close to mountains, lakes, forests and national parks. It is located 20 kilometres (12 mi) from the city of Puerto Montt on the shore of Llanquihue Lake, the second largest lake in Chile. The conical Osorno volcano and the snow capped peaks of Calbuco volcano and Mt.Tronador are clearly visible from the lakefront. Puerto Varas is the southernmost of a string of towns on the western shore of Llanquihue Lake that includes Frutillar, Llanquihue and Puerto Octay. It spans an area of 4,064.9 km^{2} (1,569 sq mi).

== History ==
The origin of the city of Puerto Varas dates to 1853 and is named after Antonio Varas, the Minister of the Interior at the time. It was founded by German immigrants who settled the shores of Lake Llanquihue as part of a chilean government colonization project during the presidency of Manuel Montt (1851-1861).

The area known as the "Llanquihue Lake Colonization Territory" was created by the government on 27 June 1853, and by the end of 1853, the first 212 German families had immigrated to what would be Puerto Varas. These families came mostly from the regions of Hesse, Silesia, Baden-Württemberg, Westphalia, Saxony, Lower Saxony, Thuringia, Rhineland-Palatinate and Bavaria. The first area to be settled was known as "La Fabrica", where the road from Puerto Montt and the coast reached Llanquihue Lake. The road did not take long to reach another sector on the shores of the Llanquihue lake. The settlers were transported in small boats to the land that had been assigned to them (the future "Puerto Chico" sector).

Another group was made up of Sudeten German settlers from Braunau, Bohemia (current Czech Republic) on 15 August 1875; they established and settled a village called Nueva Braunau, literally "New Braunau".

Other landmarks in its early history include the beginning of Llanquihue Lake navigation in 1852 with the cutter "La Fundadora", the opening of a catholic church in 1872 near the current town square and the founding of the Deutscher Verein Puerto Varas ("German Club") in October 1885.

The town received official status in the form of a Título de Villa ("Town Certification") in 1897. The commune of Puerto Varas, as it exists today, was formed in December 1925, when the Ministry of the Interior divided the country into provinces, and communes.

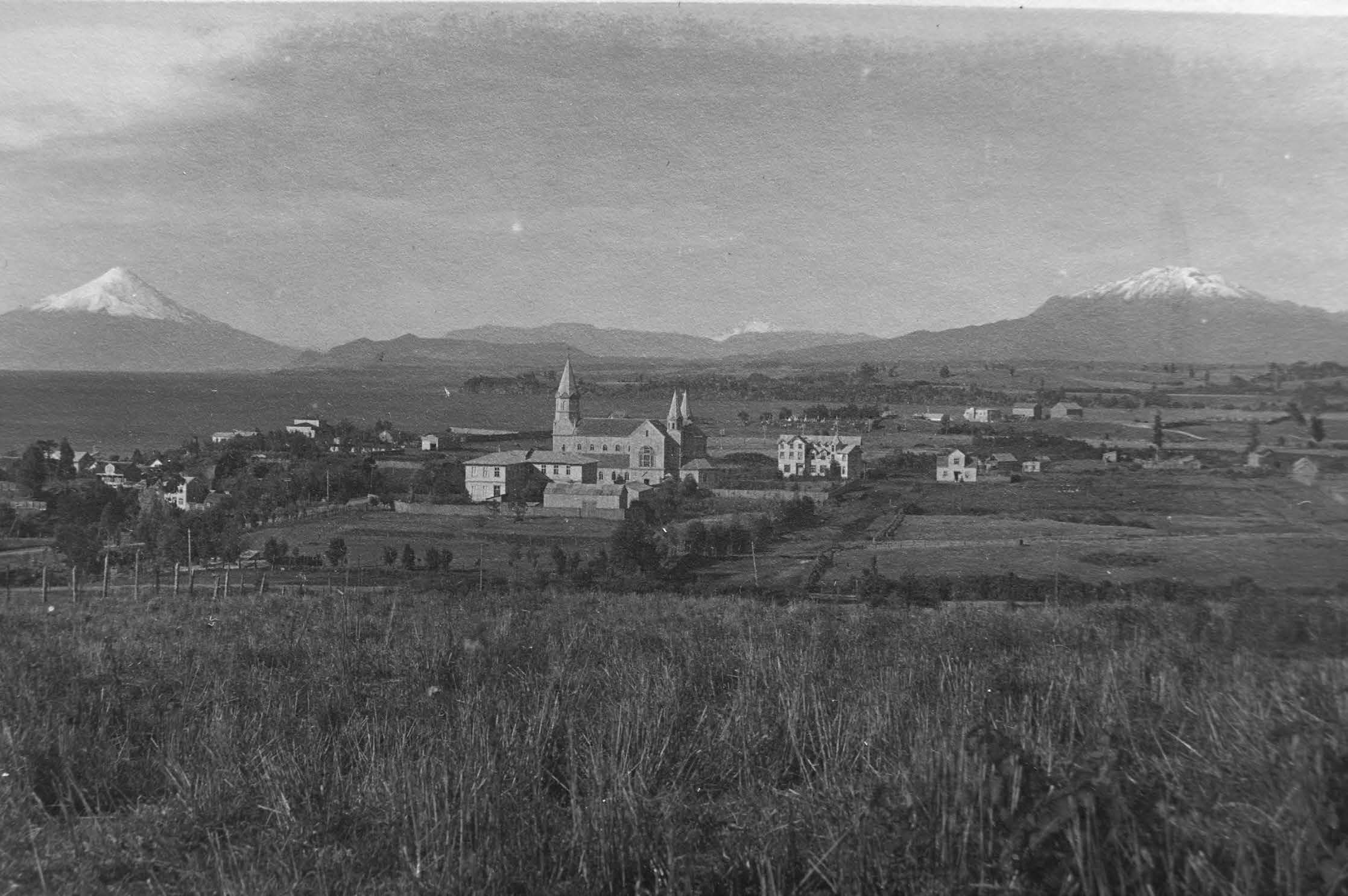
Panoramic of Puerto Varas in 1920

== Geography ==
=== Geomorphology ===
The commune of Puerto Varas is located in the fourth geomorphological area between the glacial-volcanic plain, product of the melting of glaciers thousands of years ago, with active volcanoes of the Andes mountains, pre-cordillerano reliefs and hills and coastal plains.

=== Climate ===
Puerto Varas has an oceanic climate (Cfb, according to the Köppen climate classification), with an average annual precipitation of 1,762 mm (69 in). Summers are mild and winters are rainy and somewhat chilly.

Climate data for Puerto Varas
Month	Jan	Feb	Mar	Apr	May	Jun	Jul	Aug	Sep	Oct	Nov	Dec	Year
Mean daily maximum °C (°F)	19.5 (67.1)	19.0 (66.2)	17.1 (62.8)	14.7 (58.5)	12.2 (54.0)	10.6 (51.1)	10.3 (50.5)	11.0 (51.8)	12.4 (54.3)	14.6 (58.3)	16.2 (61.2)	18.2 (64.8)	14.7 (58.4)
Daily mean °C (°F)	14.8 (58.6)	14.4 (57.9)	12.8 (55.0)	10.9 (51.6)	8.9 (48.0)	7.7 (45.9)	7.3 (45.1)	7.5 (45.5)	8.5 (47.3)	10.3 (50.5)	11.8 (53.2)	13.7 (56.7)	10.7 (51.3)
Mean daily minimum °C (°F)	10.2 (50.4)	9.9 (49.8)	8.6 (47.5)	7.2 (45.0)	5.7 (42.3)	4.8 (40.6)	4.3 (39.7)	4.0 (39.2)	4.6 (40.3)	6.0 (42.8)	7.5 (45.5)	9.2 (48.6)	6.8 (44.3)
Average precipitation mm (inches)	77 (3.0)	84 (3.3)	120 (4.7)	152 (6.0)	242 (9.5)	233 (9.2)	217 (8.5)	186 (7.3)	143 (5.6)	111 (4.4)	106 (4.2)	91 (3.6)	1,762 (69.3)
Source: Climate-data.org

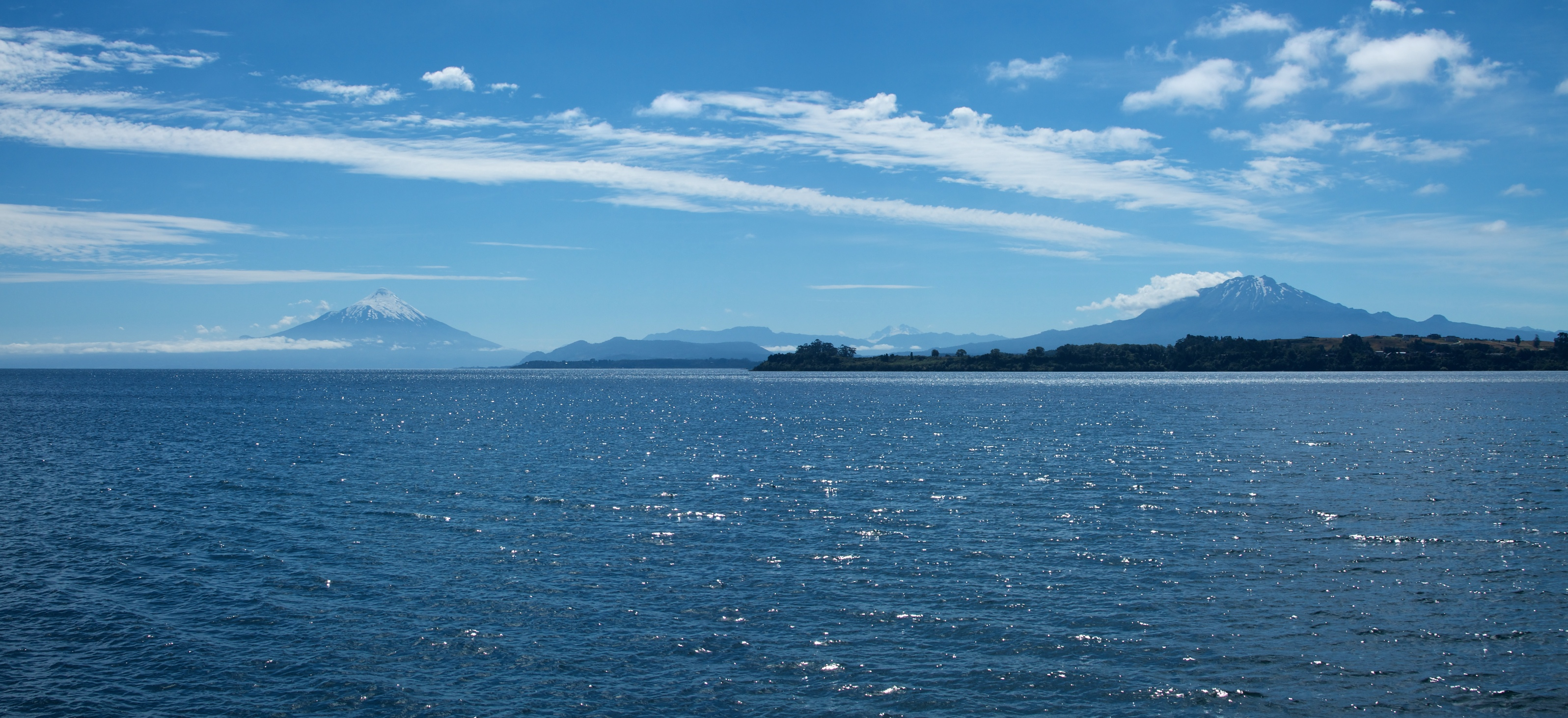
Panoramic from the city of the Llanquihue lake, Osorno and Calbuco volcanoes

== Demographics ==
Historical population
Year	Pop.	±% p.a.
1875	1,759	—
1885	2,877	+5.04%
1895	4,161	+3.76%
1907	6,403	+3.66%
1920	11,748	+4.78%
1930	16,146	+3.23%
1940	16,103	−0.03%
1952	20,843	+2.17%
1970	20,283	−0.15%
1982	21,831	+0.61%
1992	26,529	+1.97%
2002	32,912	+2.18%
2017	44,578	+2.04%
2024	52,942	+2.49%
Source: "Censo de Población y Vivienda". National Statistics Institute.

According to population projections from Chile’s National Statistics Institute, in 2012 the commune of Puerto Varas had 41,255 inhabitants (21,093 men and 20,162 women). The population had increased by 25% since the 2002 census.

== Administration ==
As a commune, Puerto Varas is a third-level administrative division of Chile administered by a municipal council headed by an alcalde who is directly elected every four years. The 2024–2028 alcalde is Tomás Garate Silva (Ind.).

Within the electoral divisions of Chile, Puerto Varas is represented in the Chamber of Deputies by Héctor Barría (DC), Emilia Nuyado (SP), Daniel Lilayu (IDU) and Harry Jürgensen (RP). It is part of the 56th electoral district, together with Puyehue, Río Negro, Purranque, Puerto Octay, Fresia, Frutillar, Llanquihue and Los Muermos.

The commune is represented in the Senate by Carlos Kuschel (NR), Iván Moreira (IDU) and Fidel Espinoza (SP) as part of the 17th senatorial constituency (Los Lagos Region).

== Around Puerto Varas ==
Puerto Varas is capital of the commune and most populated town.

- Ensenada
- Nueva Braunau
- Petrohue
- Peulla
- Río Pescado
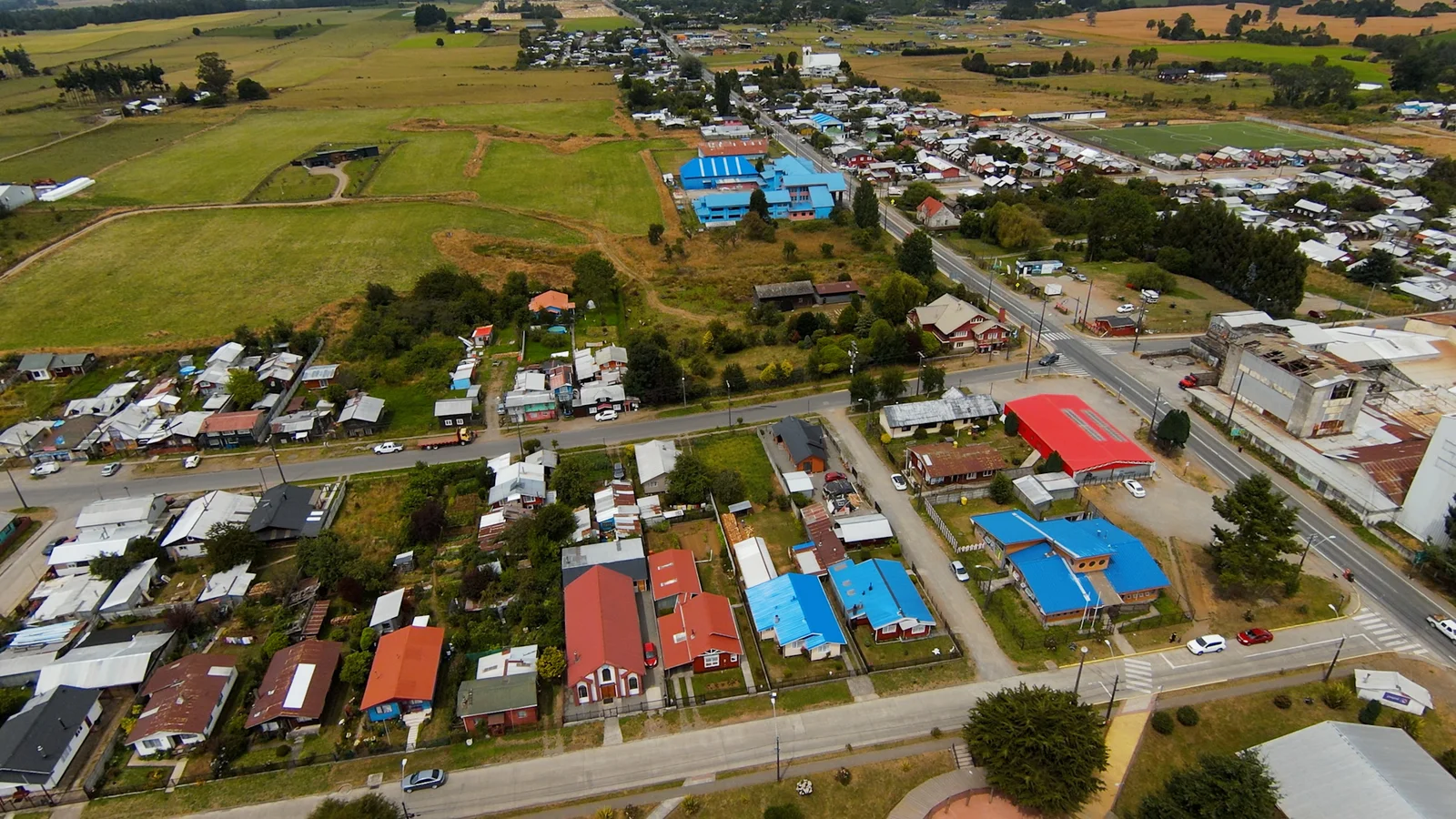
Nueva Braunau

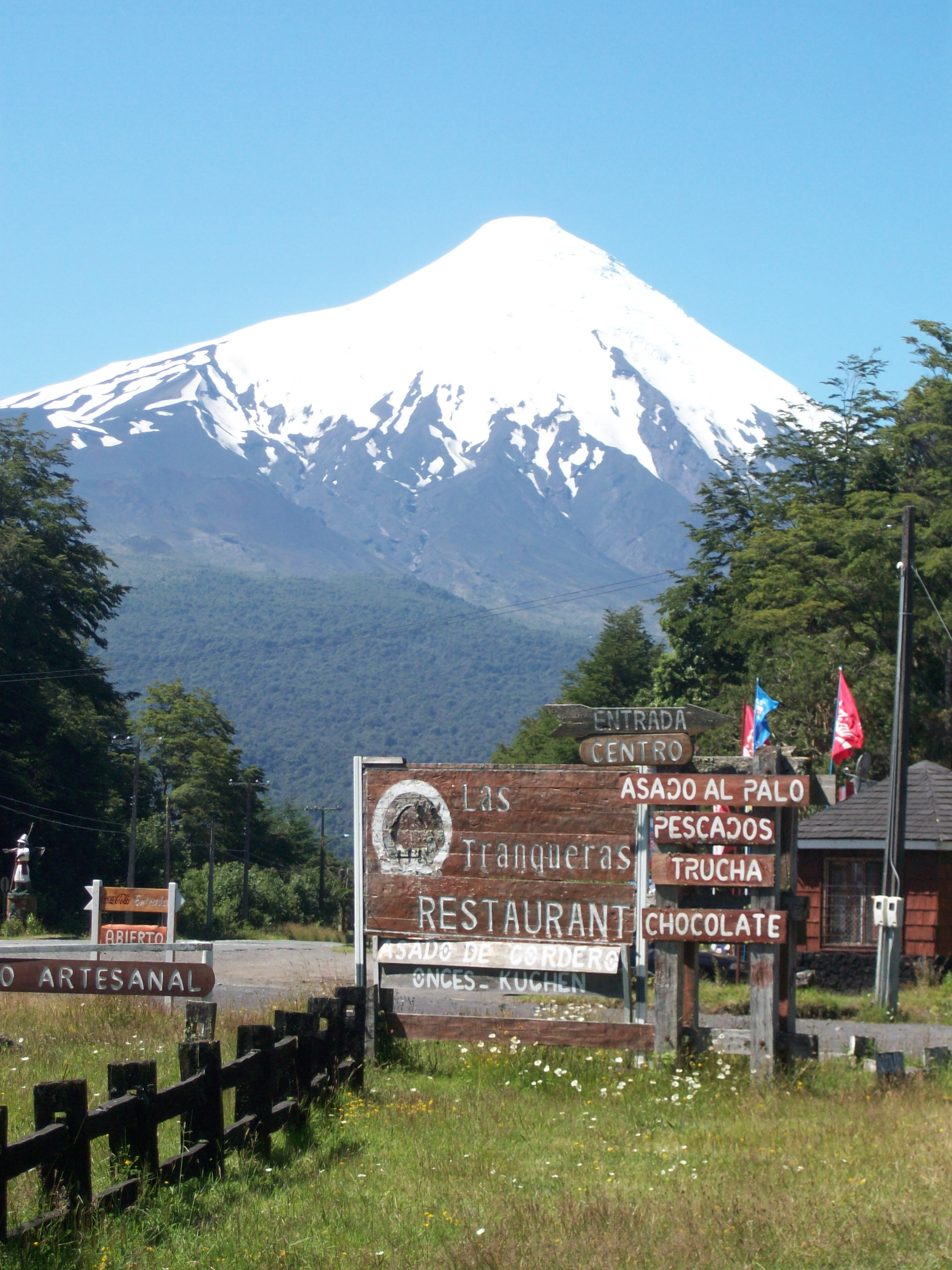
Ensenada town

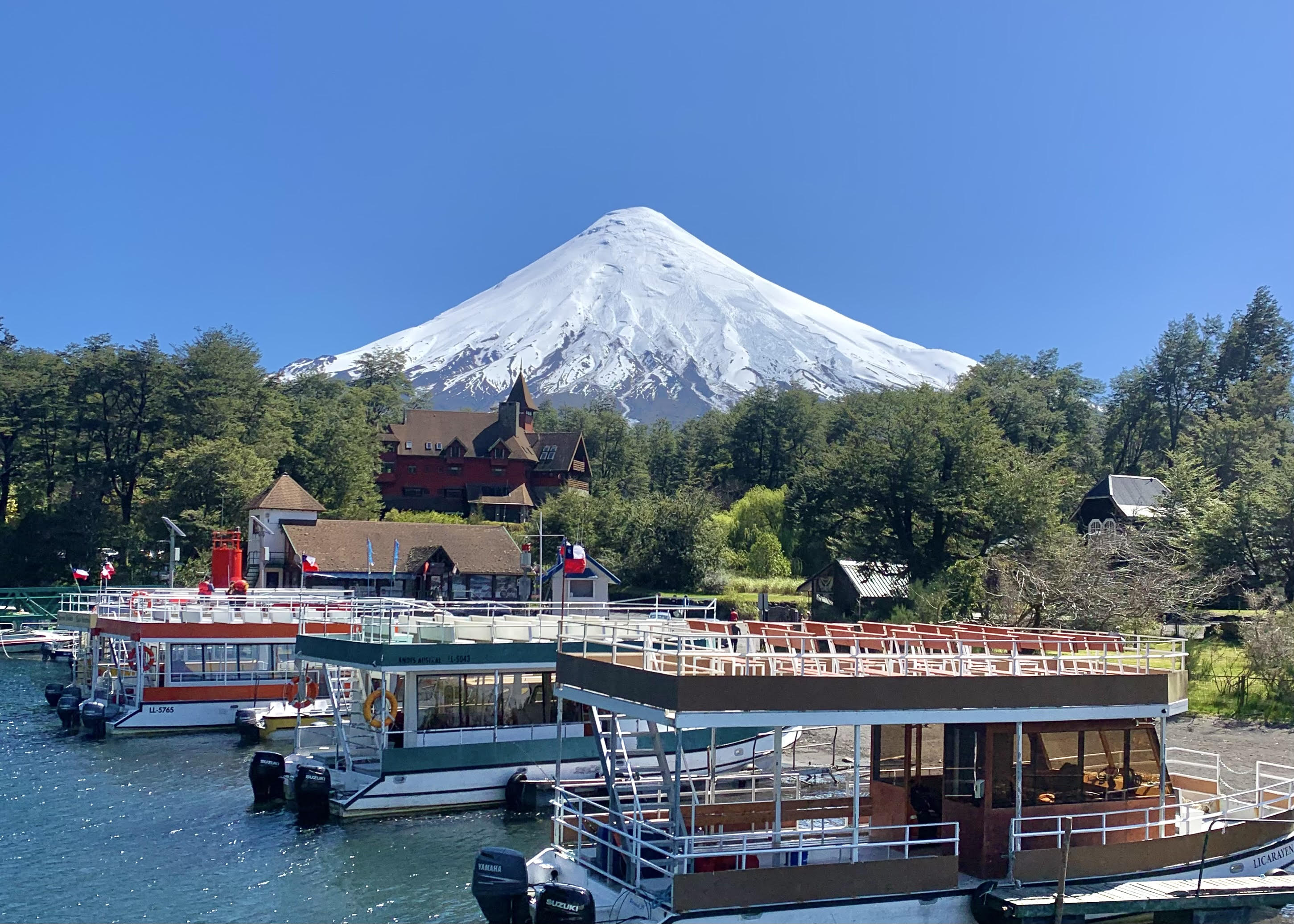
Petrohue town and the Osorno volcano

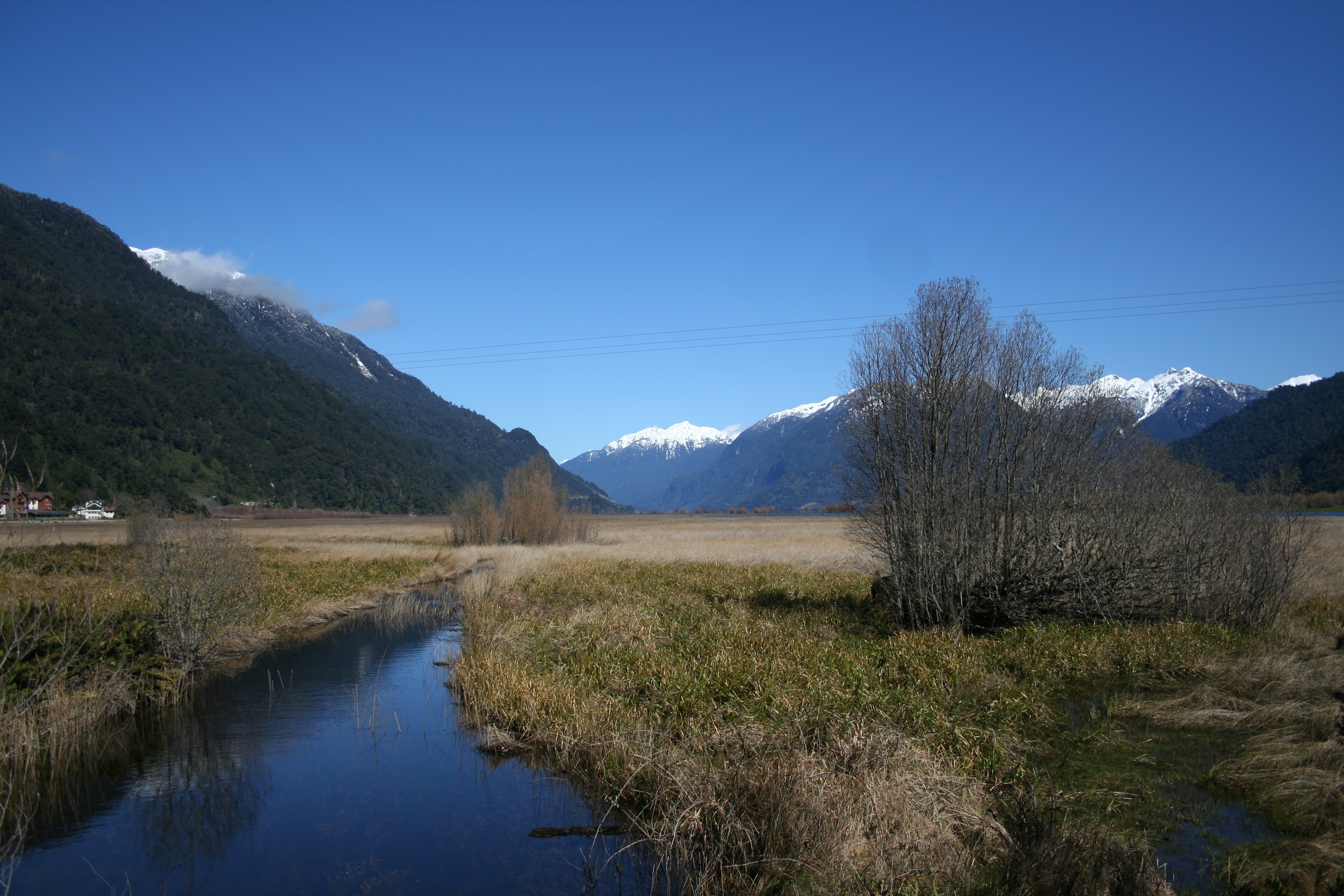
Peulla

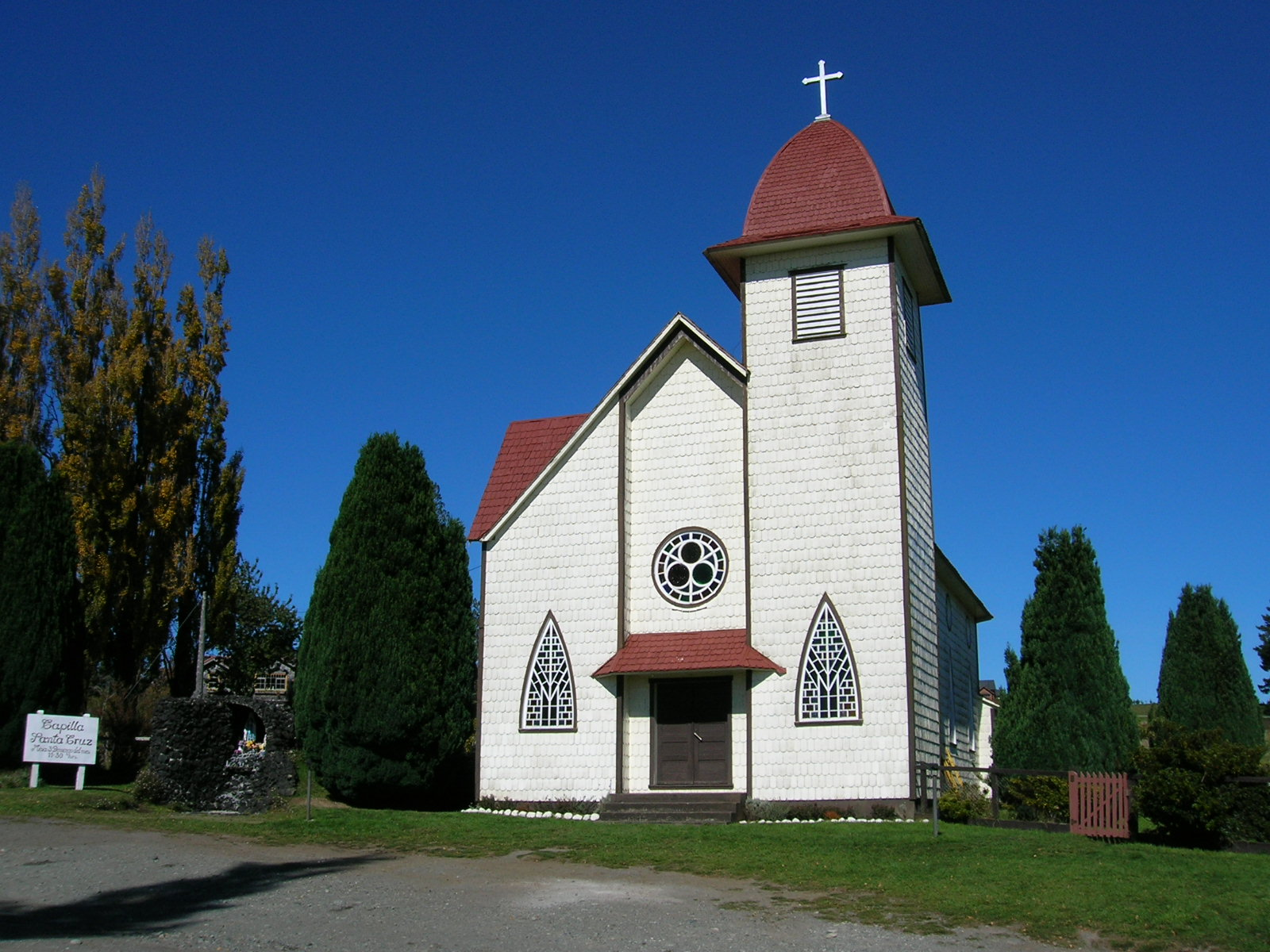
Rio Pescado chapel

== Architecture ==
Puerto Varas is characterized by traditional German architecture, with houses built from alerce wood using tools brought over from Europe by the 19th century colonial inhabitants. It was designated a Zona Típica de Puerto Varas (Heritage Zone) in 1992, is a 13 hectares in the city's western sector, including a number of protected buildings, wooden houses with steep roofs, neo-gothic details and the Iglesia del Sagrado Corazón de Jesús (Sacred Heart of Jesus Church), built in 1918 on one of the highest points in Puerto Varas, the wooden church is one of the city’s iconic landmarks in the southern Chile. Other notable protected structures include Casa Jüpner (1910), Casa Götschlich (1910), Casa Kuschel (1915), Casa Raddatz (1920), and Casa Yunge-Hitschfeld (1932).

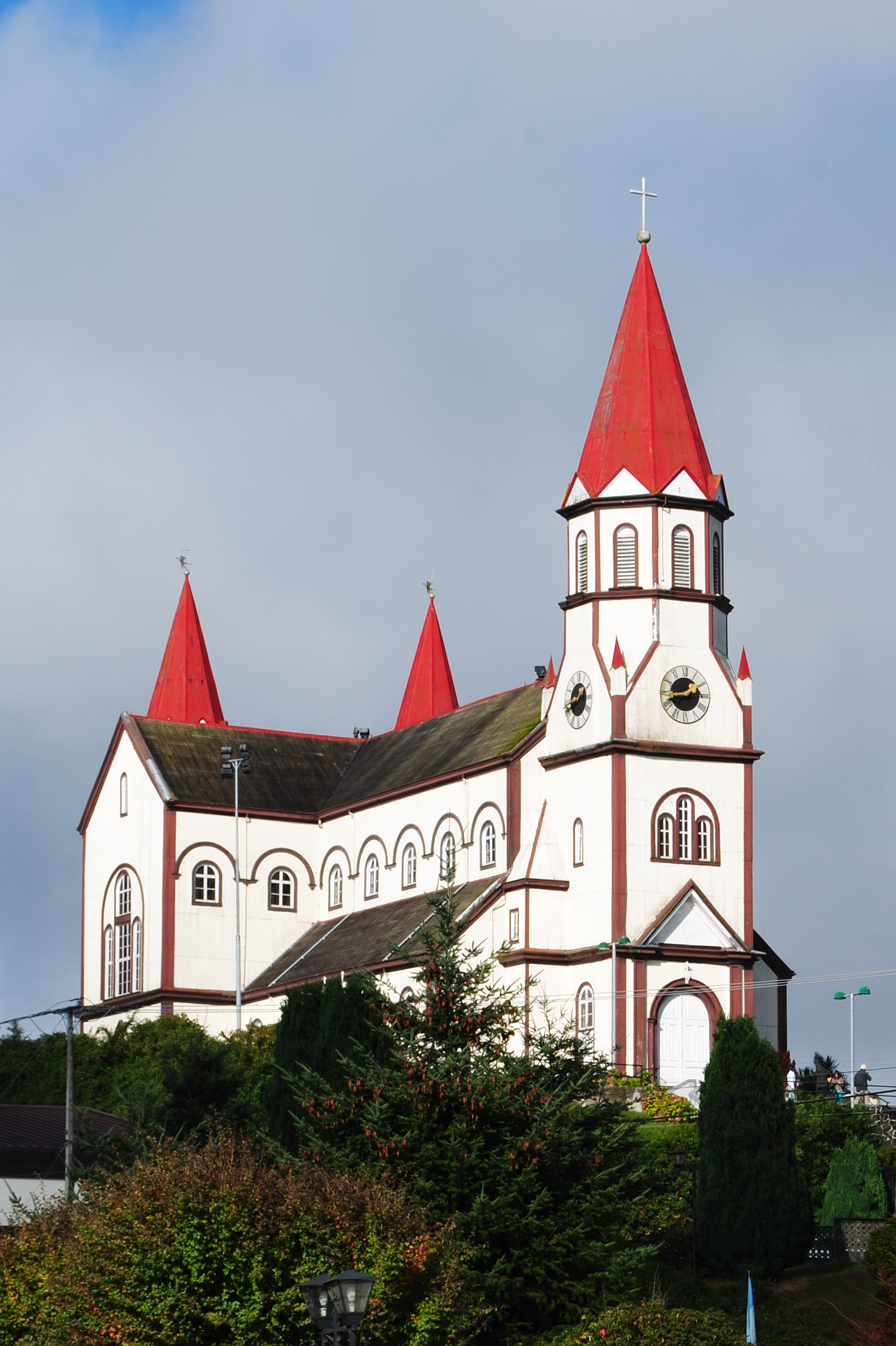
Sacred Heart of Jesus Church

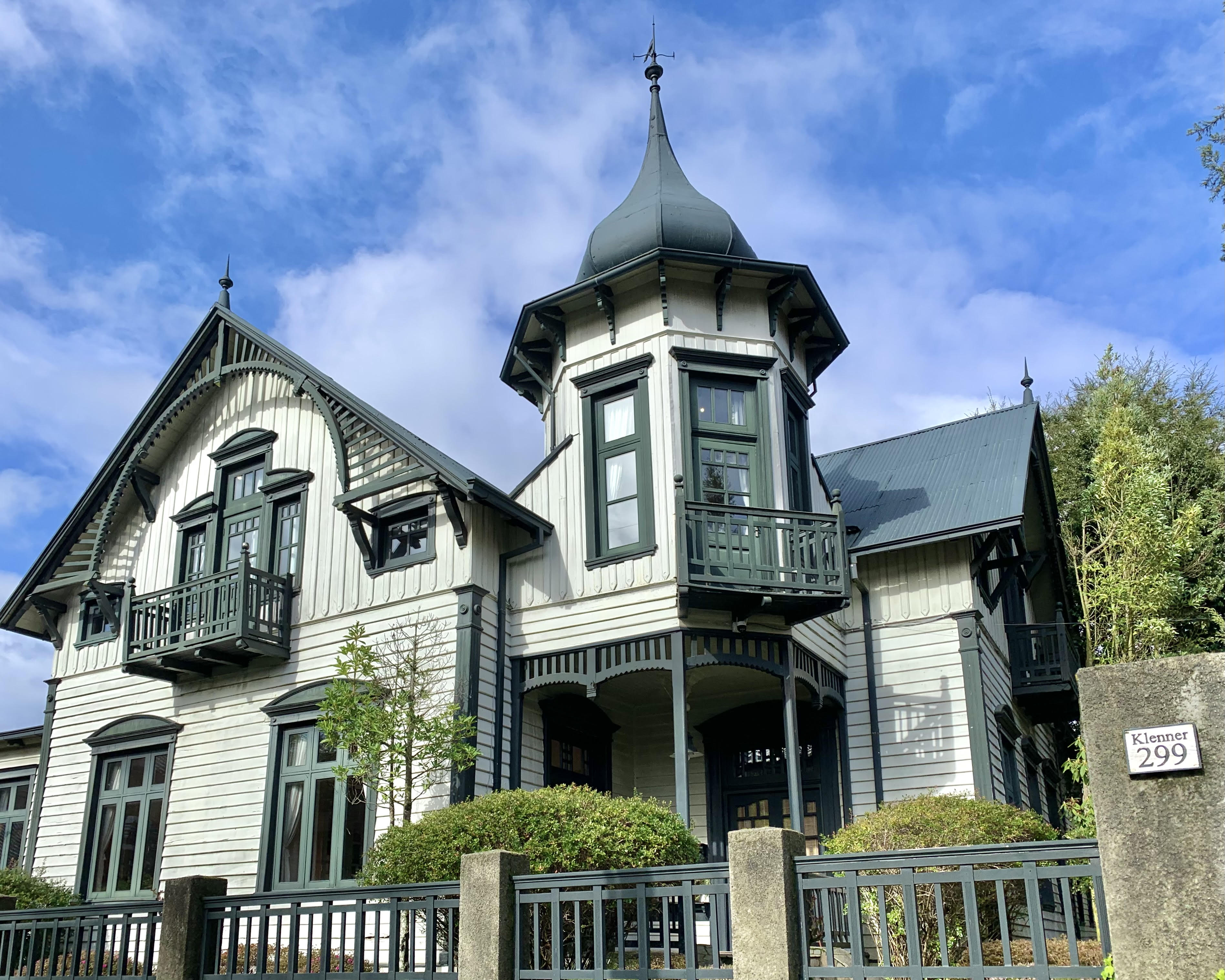
Kuschel house

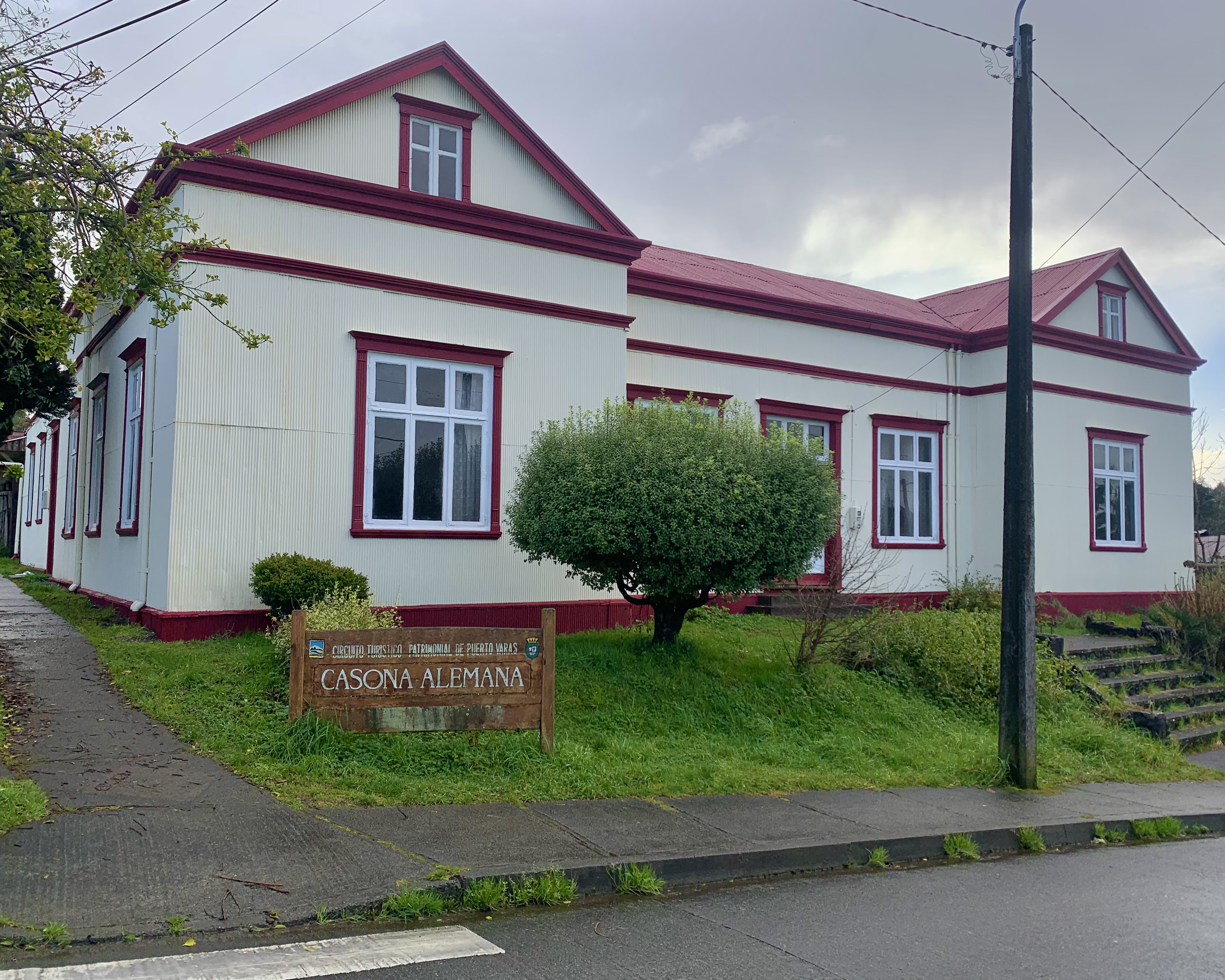
German house

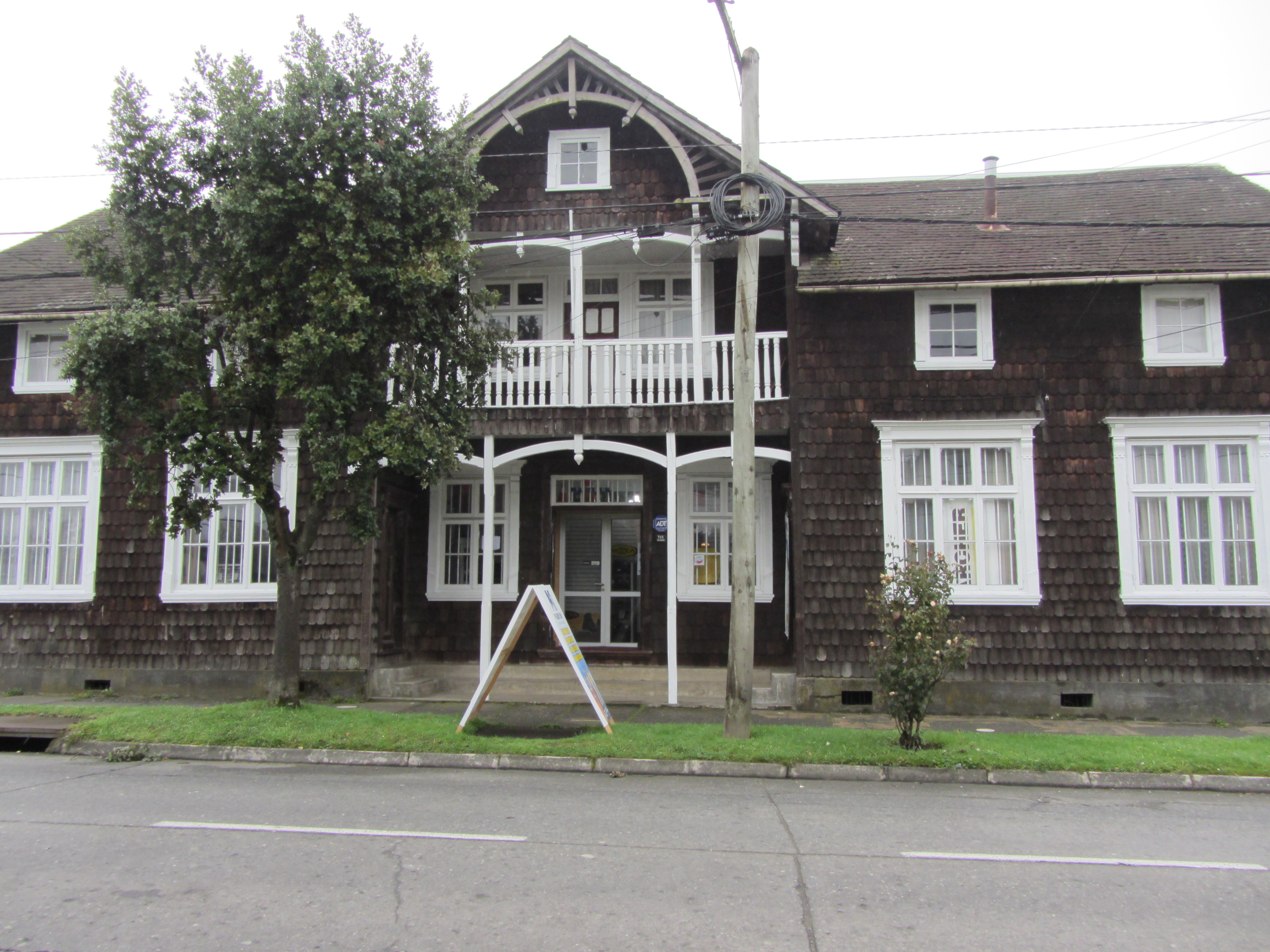
Yunge-Hitschfeld house

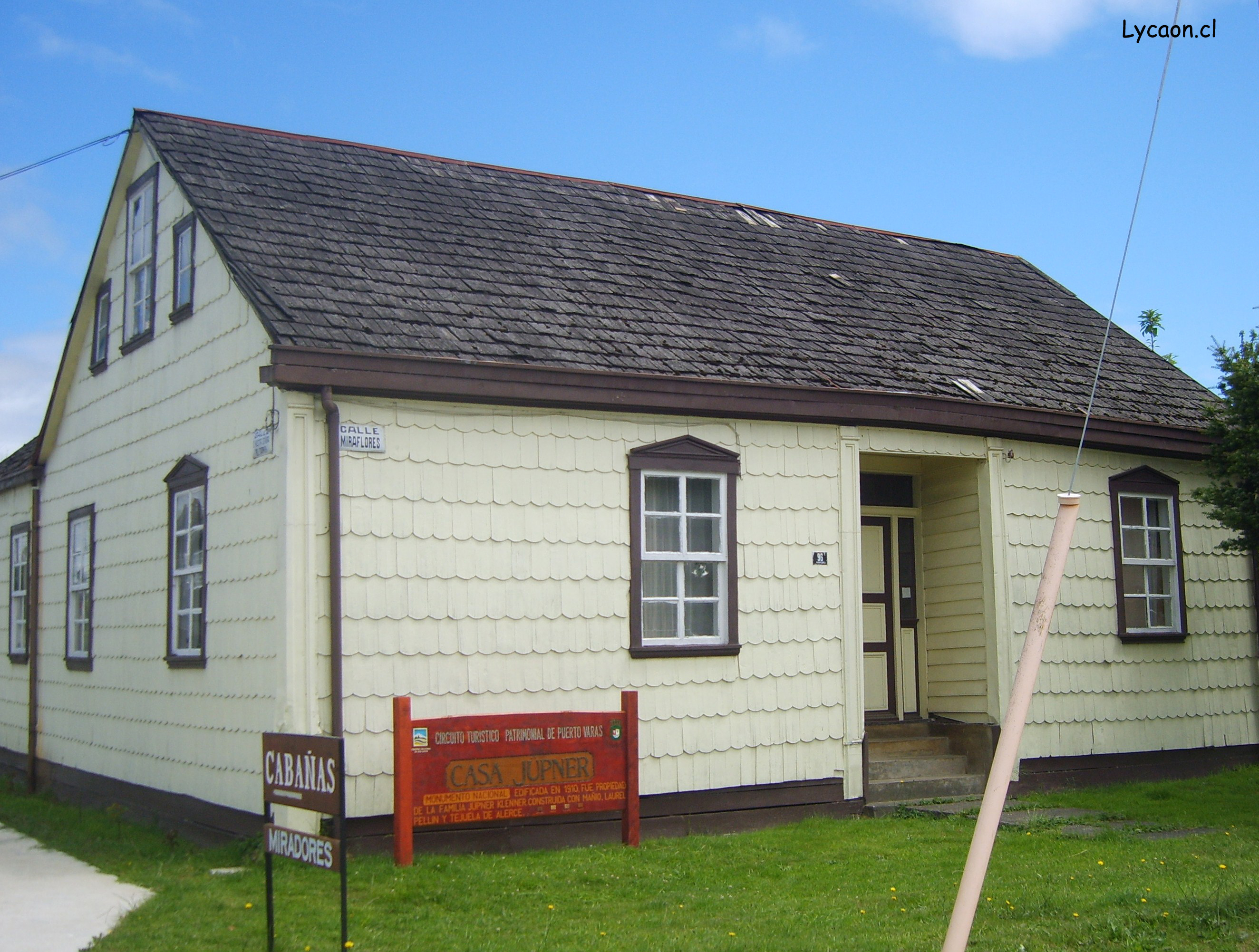
Jüpner house

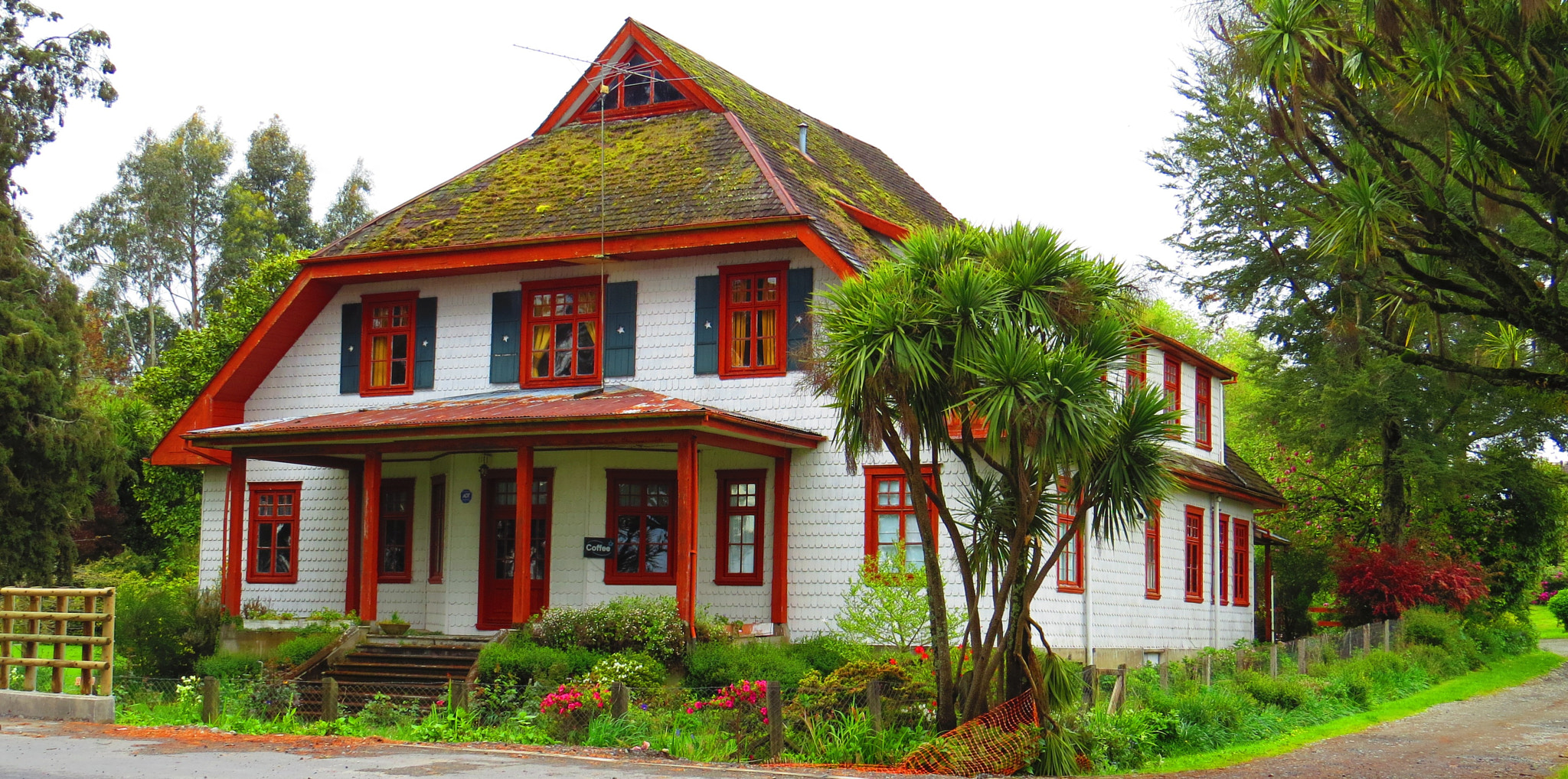
Gebauer house in Rio Pescado sector

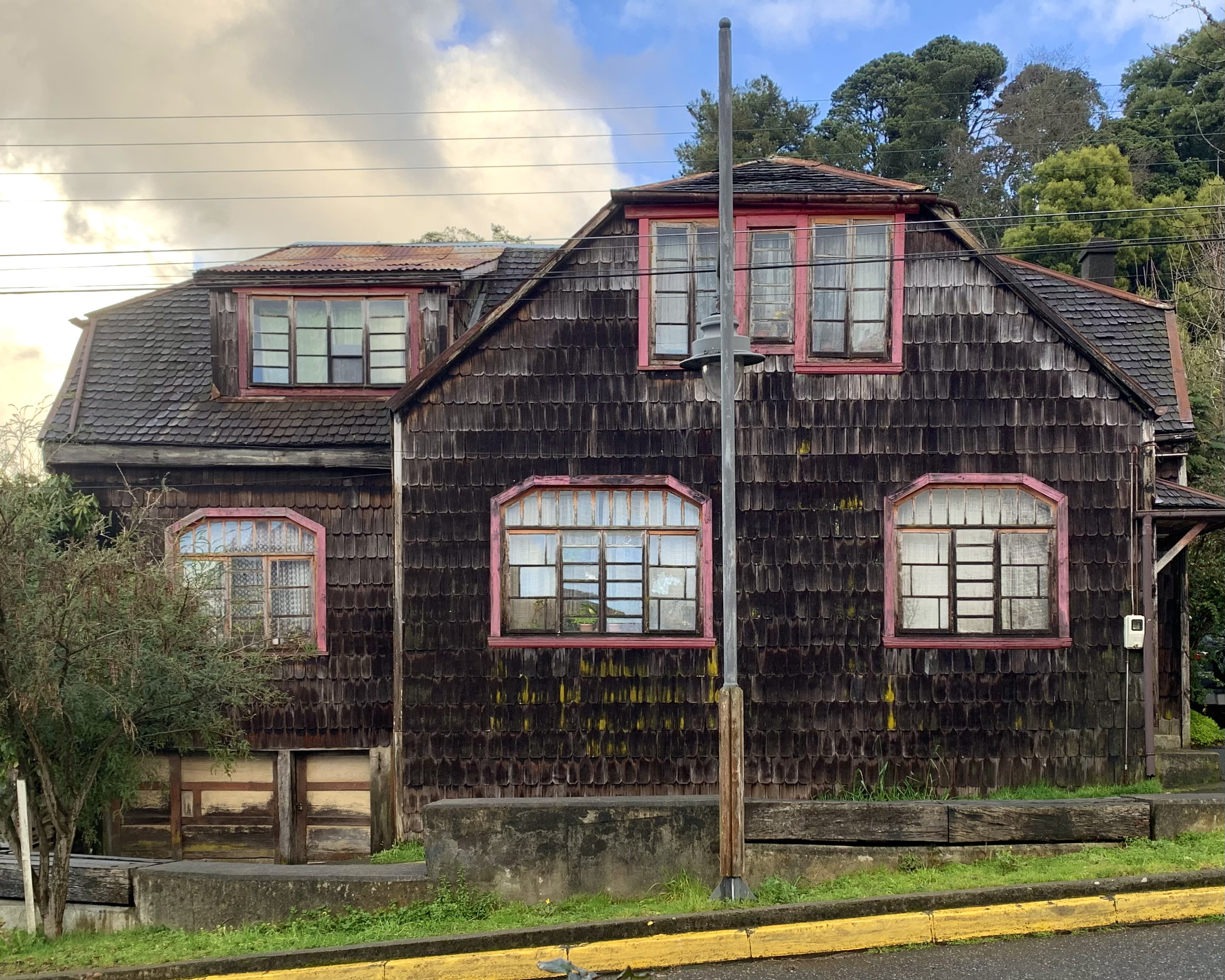
Brintrup house

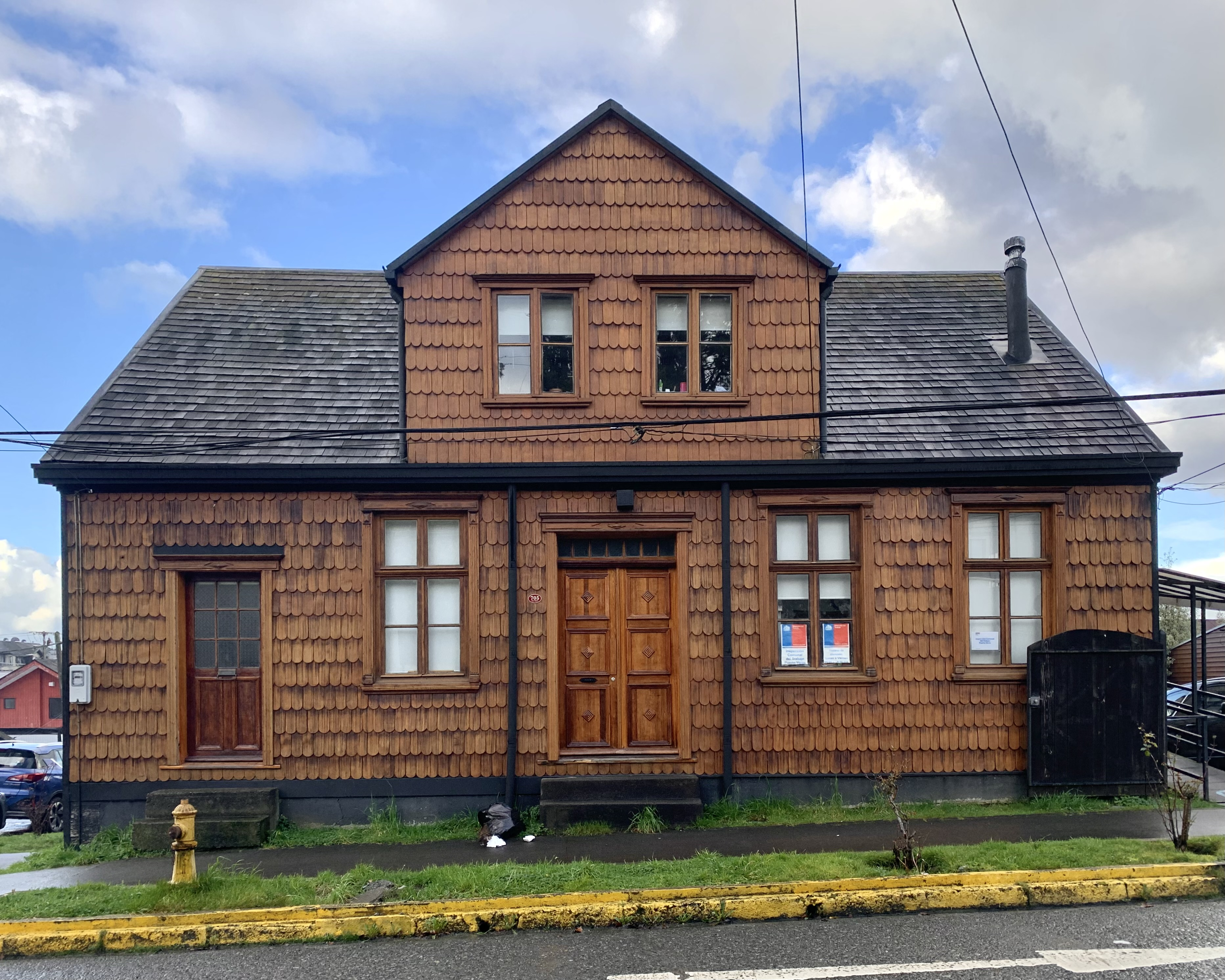
Gotschlich house

== Culture ==
=== The City of Roses ===
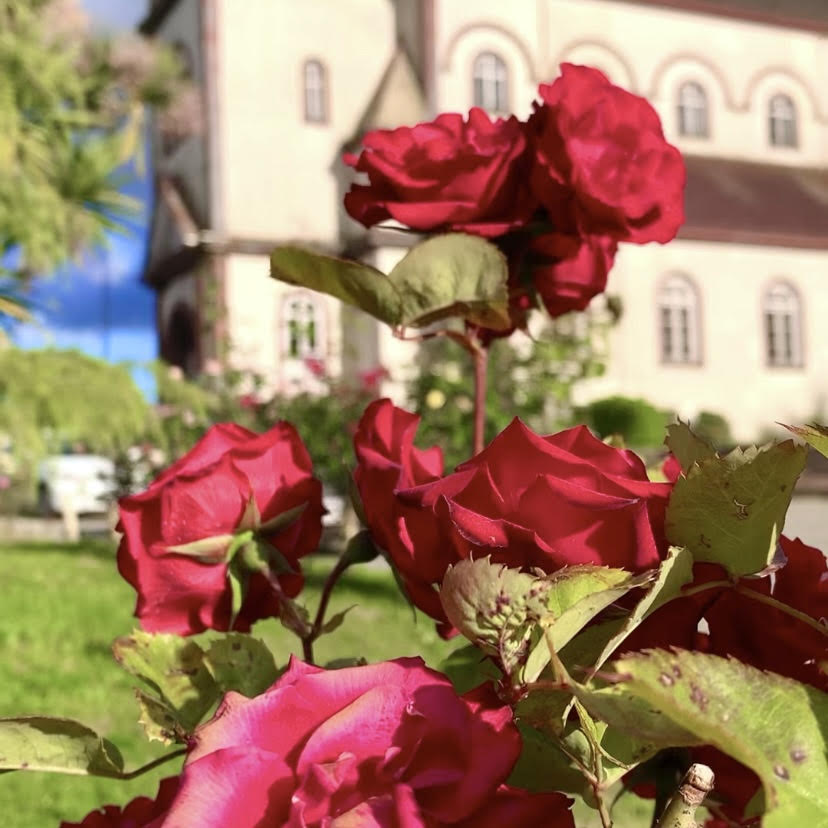
Red roses in front of the Sacred Heart of Jesus Church

Puerto Varas is also known as "The City of Roses" (La Ciudad de las Rosas) for the profusion of rose bushes planted in its streets, which during spring and summer bloom throughout the city. This name was born in the 1950s when Mayor Teobaldo Kuschel Kneer decided to plant rose bushes of different varieties in squares, parks, streets and front yard, becoming part of the city's identity.

=== Festivals and Events ===
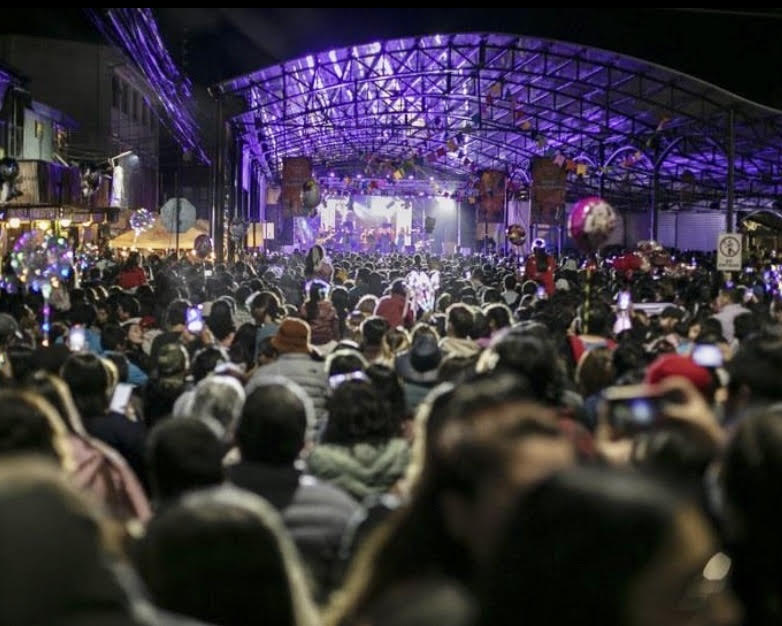
Puerto Varas Week in 2023

The commune has a different festivities and events throughout the year that attract residents and tourists.

==== Semana Puertovarina (Puerto Varas week) ====
Usually taking place in February, this is the city's main summer festival, featuring open-air concerts with renowned Chilean artists, local arts, crafts and family activities.

==== Kuchen Tag (Kuchen Day) ====
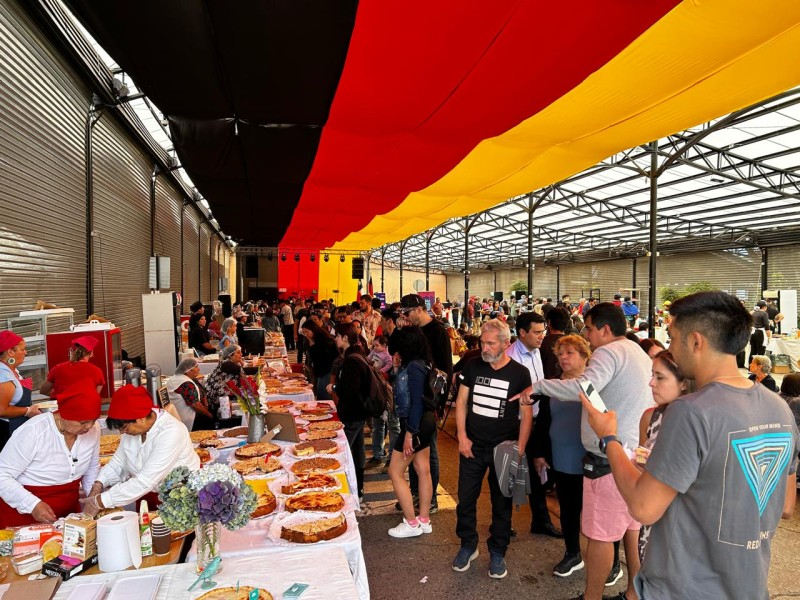
Kuchen Tag 2025

Is one of Puerto Varas' most popular gastronomic celebrations, specifically honoring the rich German pastry heritage brought in 19th century German settlers. The Festival transforms the city into an open-air pastry market where local bakers, home cooks and renowned bakeries showcase regional recipes.

==== Fiesta de la murta (Murta Festival) ====
Held around April in the nearby sector of Ensenada, this local festival celebrates the murta, a native berry from this region with traditional food, artisan crafts and live folk music.

==== Festival de la Lluvia (Rain Festival) ====
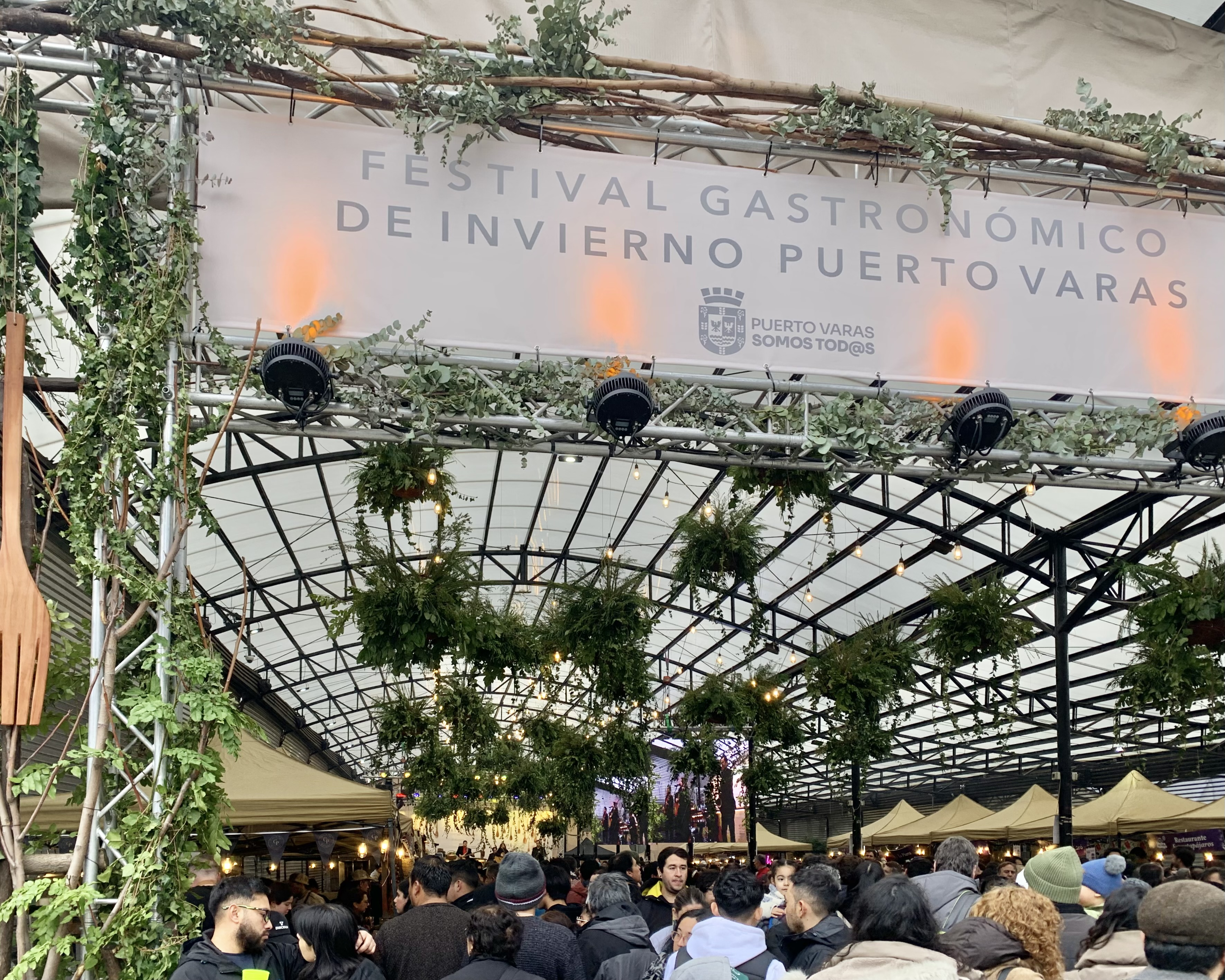
Puerto Varas Winter Gastronomic Festival 2026

Held annually in June, this community festival celebrates the winter season with the Umbrella Parade, the Crazy Bed Race, the Waiters' race and live folk music.

==== Festival Gastronómico de Invierno (Winter Gastronomic Festival) ====
Event that takes place at the end of July and beginning of August in the City Square and seeks to promote local gastronomy and tourism in the winter season. There is music, live cooking with outstanding national chefs, samples of local products and tasting of dishes from different restaurants, cafes, and hotels in the commune.

==== El Color del Sur (The Color of the South) ====
Event of national relevance of meeting of chilean visual artist focused on national painting that meet in Puerto Varas. This event starts in August until November, a period where the call and digital application of the visual works where interested artists participate is opened. From January to March, the main meeting of selection of paintings and awarding of the winning artists it held, the in situ days of outdoor painting in different spaces of the commune and the collective exhibition at the Molino Machmar Art Center (CAMM).

==== Carnaval del Sur (Carnival of the South) ====
Event that takes place on the first days of December and that through theatre and dance, seeks to value the local identity in shows in different public spaces of the city.

=== Others cultural points ===
==== Cultural institutions ====
In Puerto Varas include the Antonio Felmer Museum in Nueva Braunau, the Molino Machmar Art Centre (CAMM), the Nativo Bosque Gallery and the Pablo Fierro Museum. Nearby Frutillar hosts the annual Frutillar Musical Weeks in January and February.

== Cuisine ==
Puerto Varas offers restaurants with high-level cuisine, coffee shops, pubs and bars that offer a varied menu, where traditional cuisine is mixed with contemporary cuisine, making them one of the most attractive gastronomic destinations nationwide.

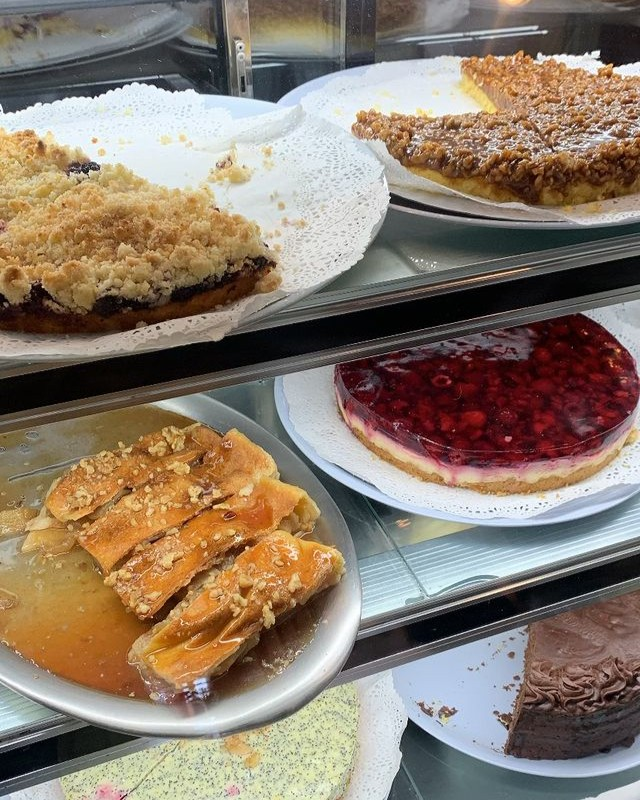
Typical local pastry with German influence

Its typical gastronomy stands out for German pastries especially kuchen, sweets klöße, cookies, cakes, chocolates, marzipan, and artisan marmalades as a culinary offer in the town’s shops, restaurants and coffee shops. Around the traditional kuchen since the end of the 1990's "Kuchen Day" or "Kuchen Tag" is held where hundred of exhibitors participate every year with a huge variety of this dessert.

Can be found traditional German dishes based on pork, sausages, cheeses in supermarkets, stores, restaurants and hotels in the area, there is also gastronomy associated with meats of Southern Chile like beef, lamb, deer, wild boar, chicken, salmon and others. The production of craft beer and liquors is presente in the local gastronomy.

== Tourism ==
Puerto Varas is a popular tourist destination with its distinctive German-inspired architecture, wide variety of hotels and inns, a casino, a beach and striking views over the lake to the Osorno and Calbuco volcanoes.

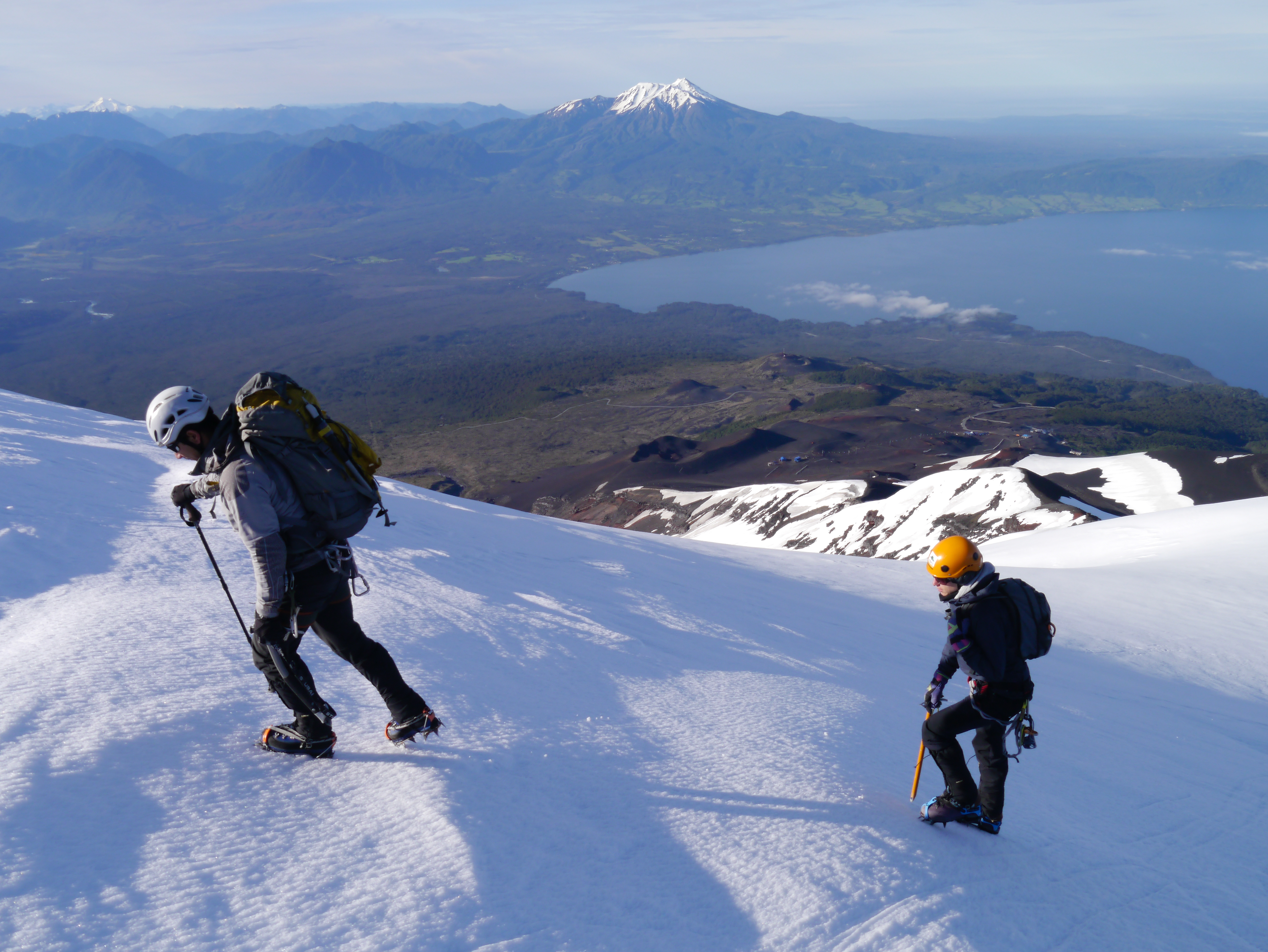
Osorno volcano

Visitors can take part in a range of outdoor sports including kayaking, fishing and trekking, and there is a winter ski centre on the slopes of Osorno Volcano. It is a good base for excursions to nearby natural landmarks including the emerald Todos los Santos Lake, the picturesque Petrohué Falls (Spanish: Saltos de Petrohué), Vicente Pérez Rosales National Park and Puyehue National Park as well as Osorno Volcano. Trips are also possible to other towns around Llanquihue Lake including Frutillar, Puerto Octay and Llanquihue.

Puerto Varas is a departure point for bus-and-boat crossings of the Andes to San Carlos de Bariloche, Argentina. The route passes through forested mountain landscapes and several lakes. Some itineraries include an overnight stay at a hotel along the way.

== Education ==
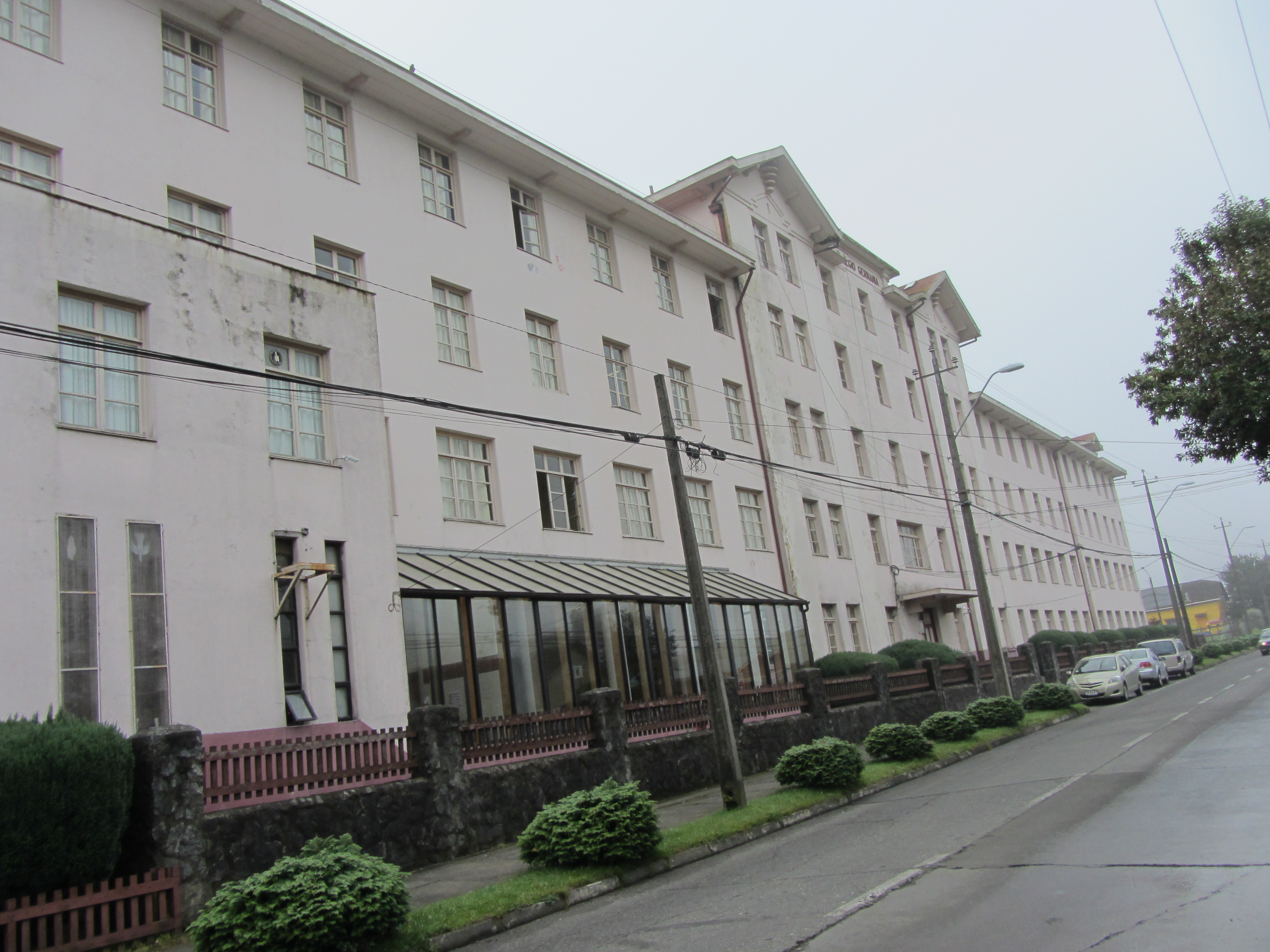
Colegio Germania del Verbo Divino, founded in 1916

Since the arrival of German settlers to the Southern Chile in 1853, there was a need for the first inhabitants to create educational institutions so that children could receive education. In 1857 the first "Deustche Schule" in the city was founded that had an initial enrollment of 25 students. This school sought to maintain the German language and the traditions.

In 1903 under the Catholic education of the Sisters of Christian Charity at the hands of 5 nuns from Paderborn, Germany, the ''Immaculate Conception College of Puerto Varas" was founded.

In 1916, the ''Colegio Germania del Verbo Divino" was founded under Catholic education requested by the inhabitants of the city. Since the mid-twentieth century, several schools were founded due to demographic growth and educational need.

- Colegio Alemán de Puerto Varas
- Colegio Germania del Verbo Divino
- Colegio Inmaculada Concepción
- Colegio Rosita Novaro
- Colegio Terravida
- Colegio Puerto Varas
- Escuela Grupo Escolar
- Liceo Pedro Aguirre Cerda
- Colegio Waldorf Puerto Varas

== Transportation ==
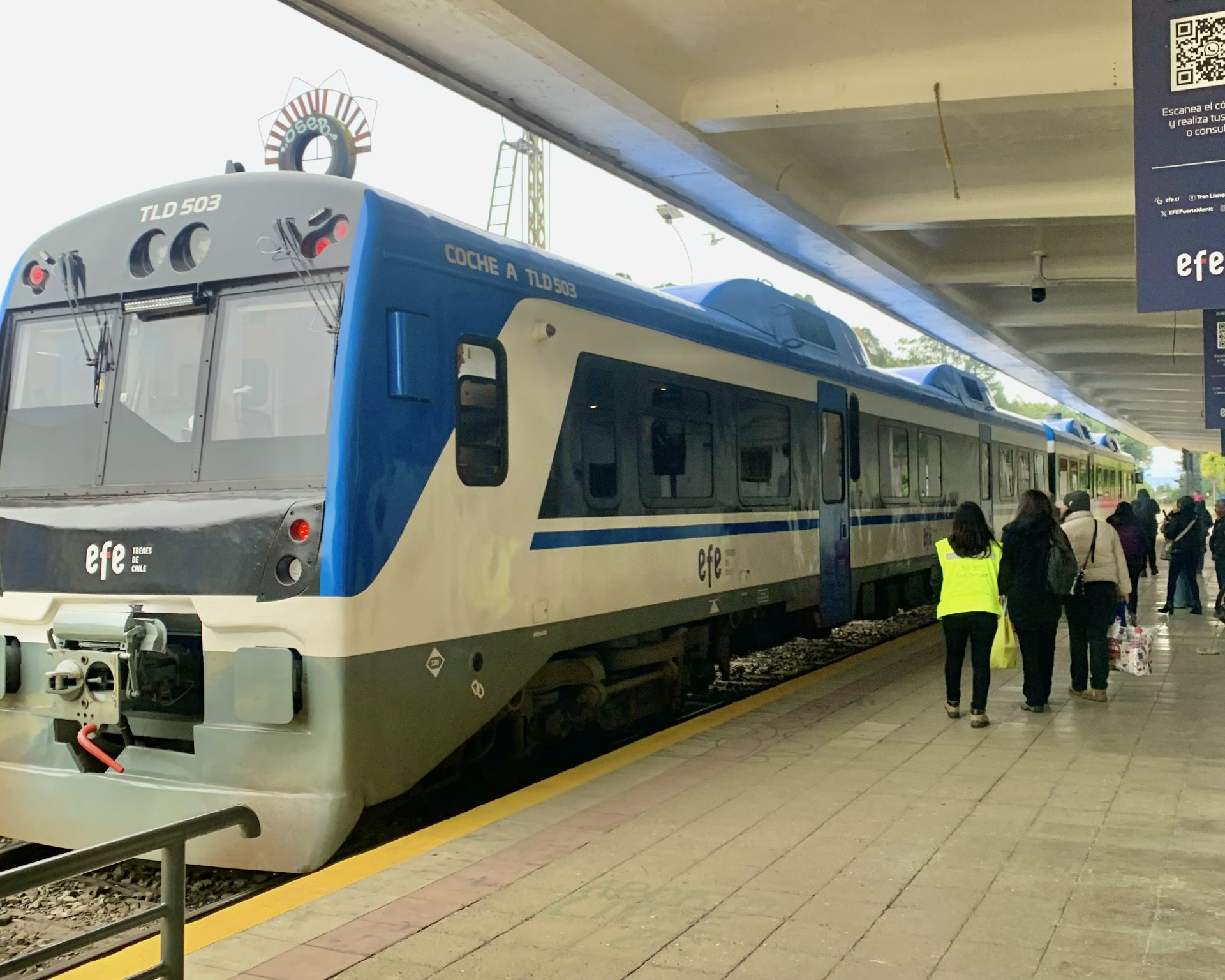
An TLF-503 train approaching Puerto Varas Train Station

The commune maintains an important transport network which allows you to reach almost all the communes of the Llanquihue province by land, in addition to Puerto Montt. The city is also the connection point to travel to Ensenada, Nueva Braunau, Petrohué Waterfalls, Peulla and Bariloche.

The city has the Puerto Varas Train Station, which since April 2025 has been in service with Llanquihue – Puerto Montt Line that connects the city with Puerto Montt, Alerce and Llanquihue.

The nearby El Tepual International Airport for Puerto Montt is served by many daily non-stop flights from Santiago, as well as numerous flights from other cities. More than 1,100,000 passengers a year use the airport.

== Sports ==
=== Basketball ===
- Club Deportivo Social y Cultural Puerto Varas

=== Football ===
- Club Deportivo y Social 21 de Mayo
- Club Deportivo Juan Costa
- Selección de fútbol amateur de Puerto Varas

=== Rugby ===
- Jabalíes de Puerto Varas

=== Triathlon ===
Ironman 70.3 Puerto Varas

=== Rowing ===
- Club Remo Patagonia Puerto Varas
- Club Remo Puerto Varas

=== Hockey ===
- Traf Hockey Club

=== Cycling ===
- Club ciclista Puerto Varas

=== Golf ===
- Club de Golf El Alba

== Twin towns – sister cities ==
- Abbottabad, Pakistan
- Bariloche, Argentina
- Gramado, Brazil
- Maldonado, Uruguay

== Photo gallery ==
Puerto Varas, Chile

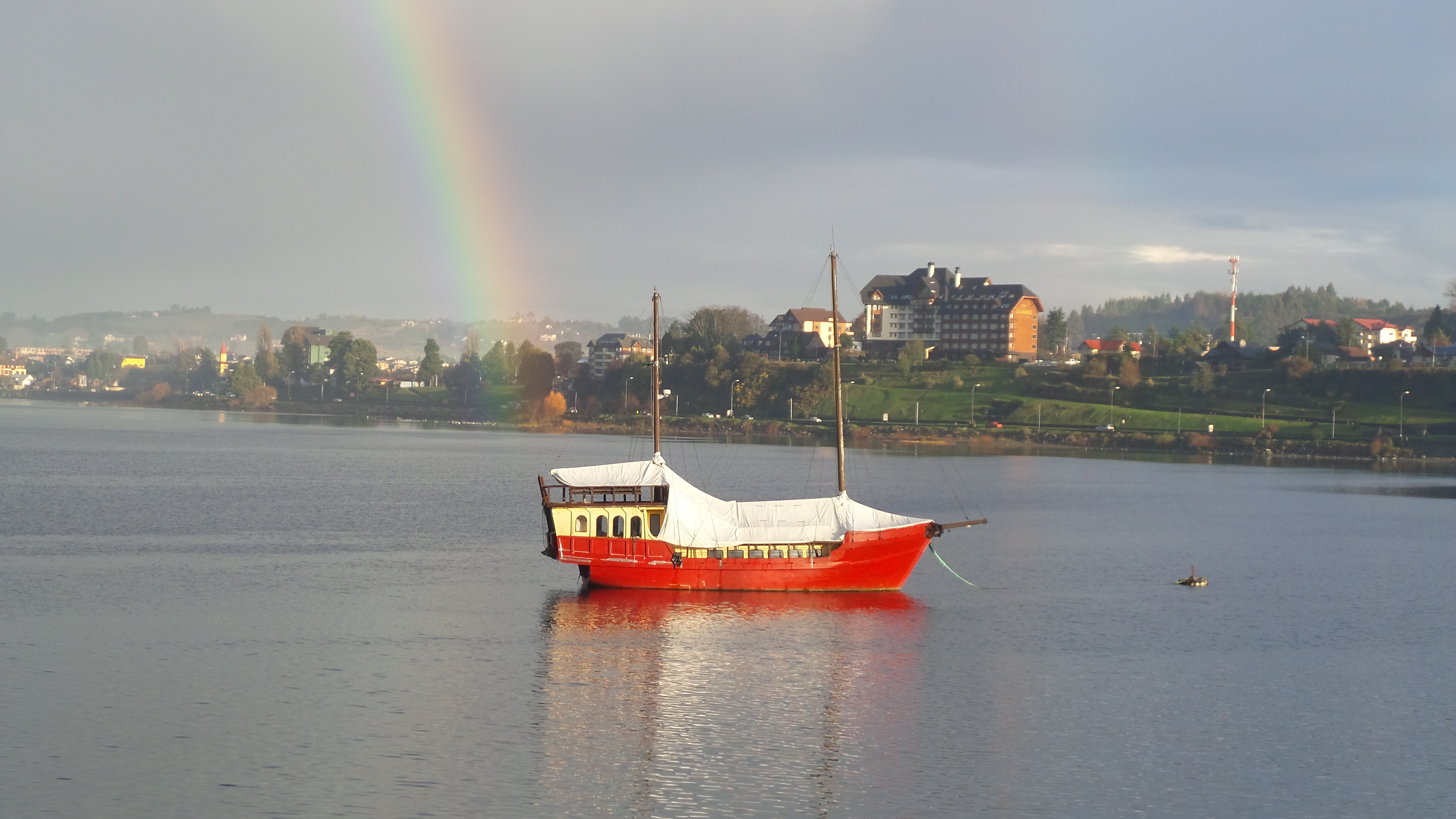
A ketch on Llanquihue Lake, with a rainbow in the background

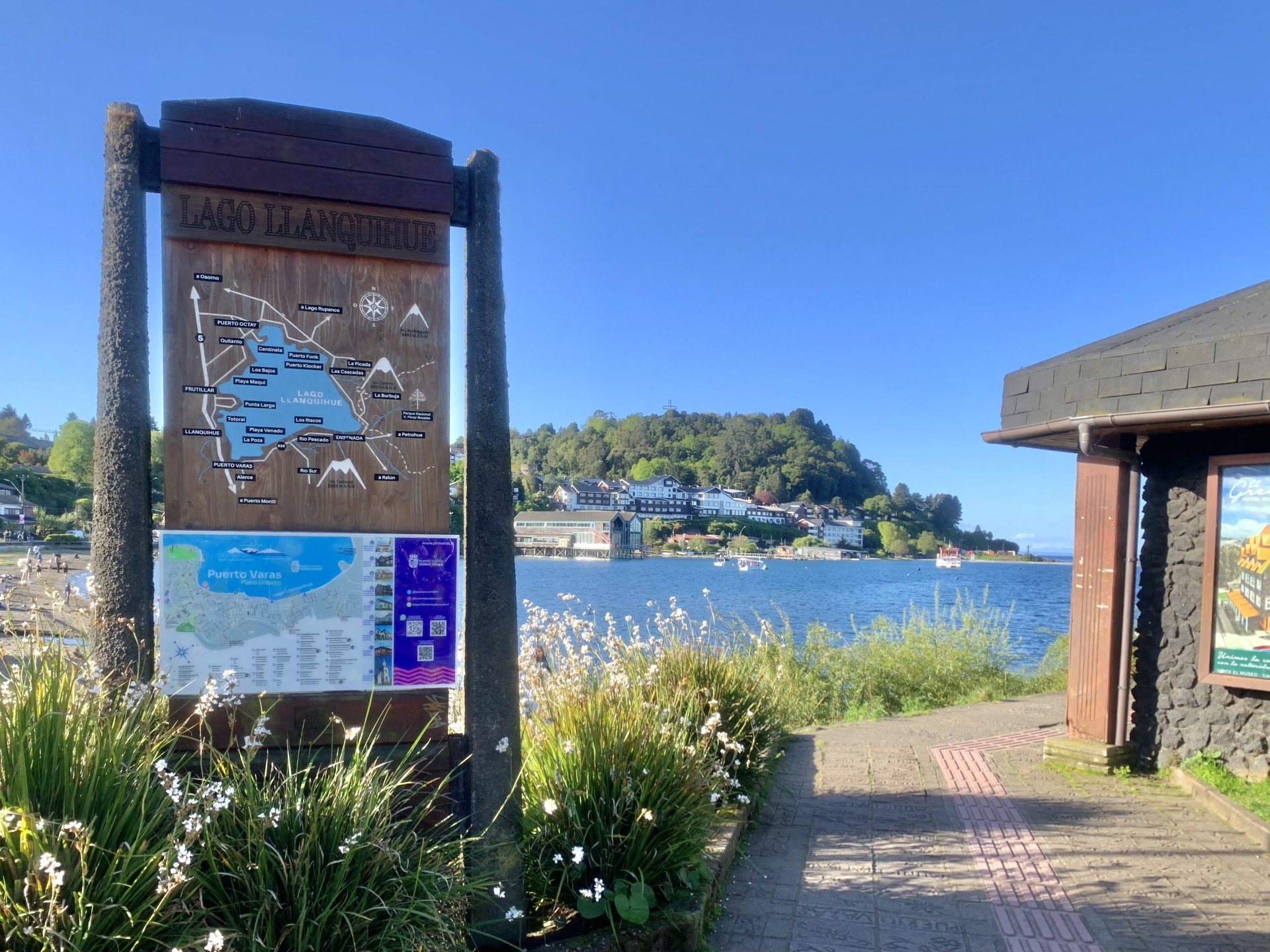
Tourist information centre

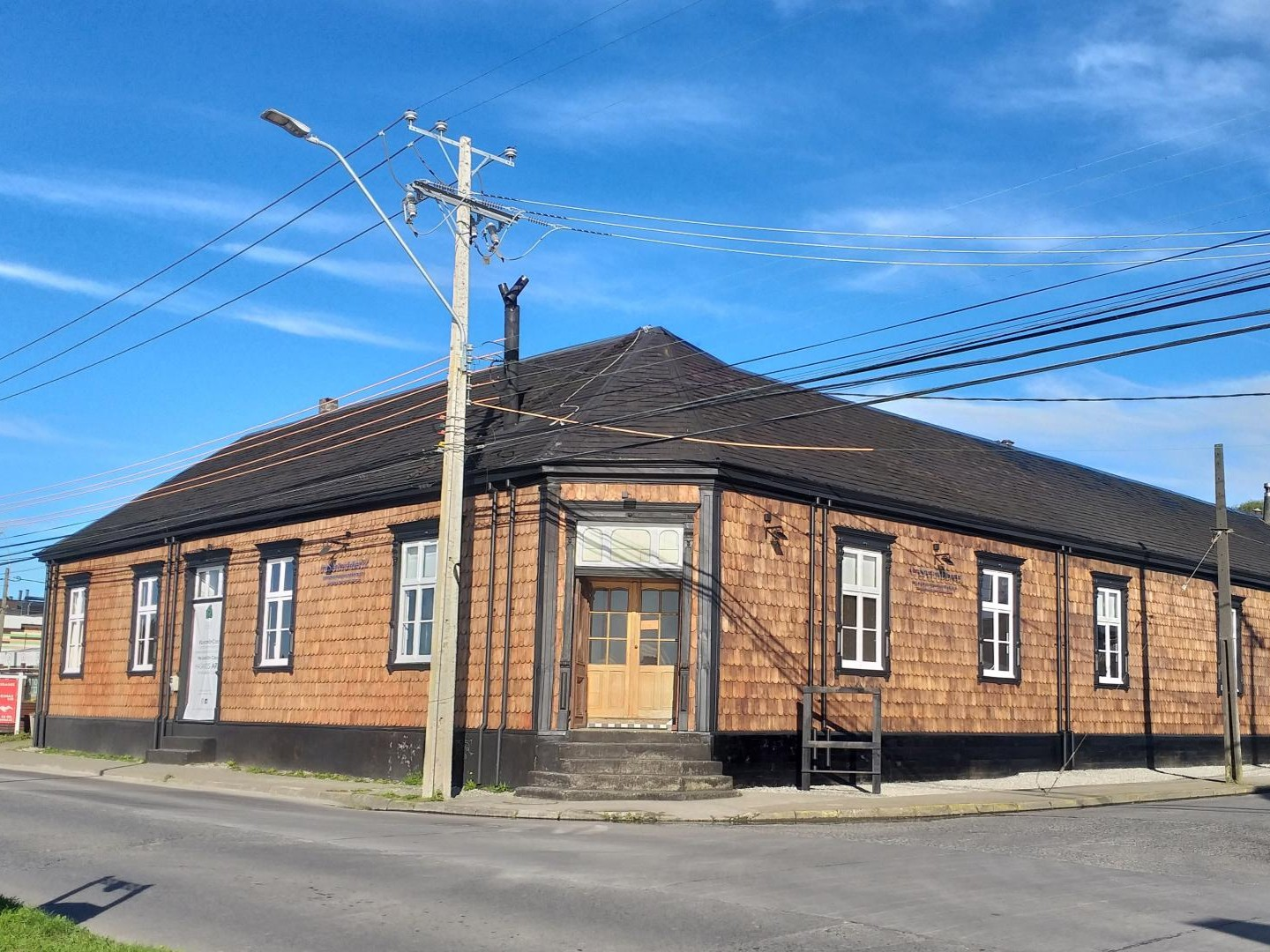
Raddatz house with typical wooden architecture

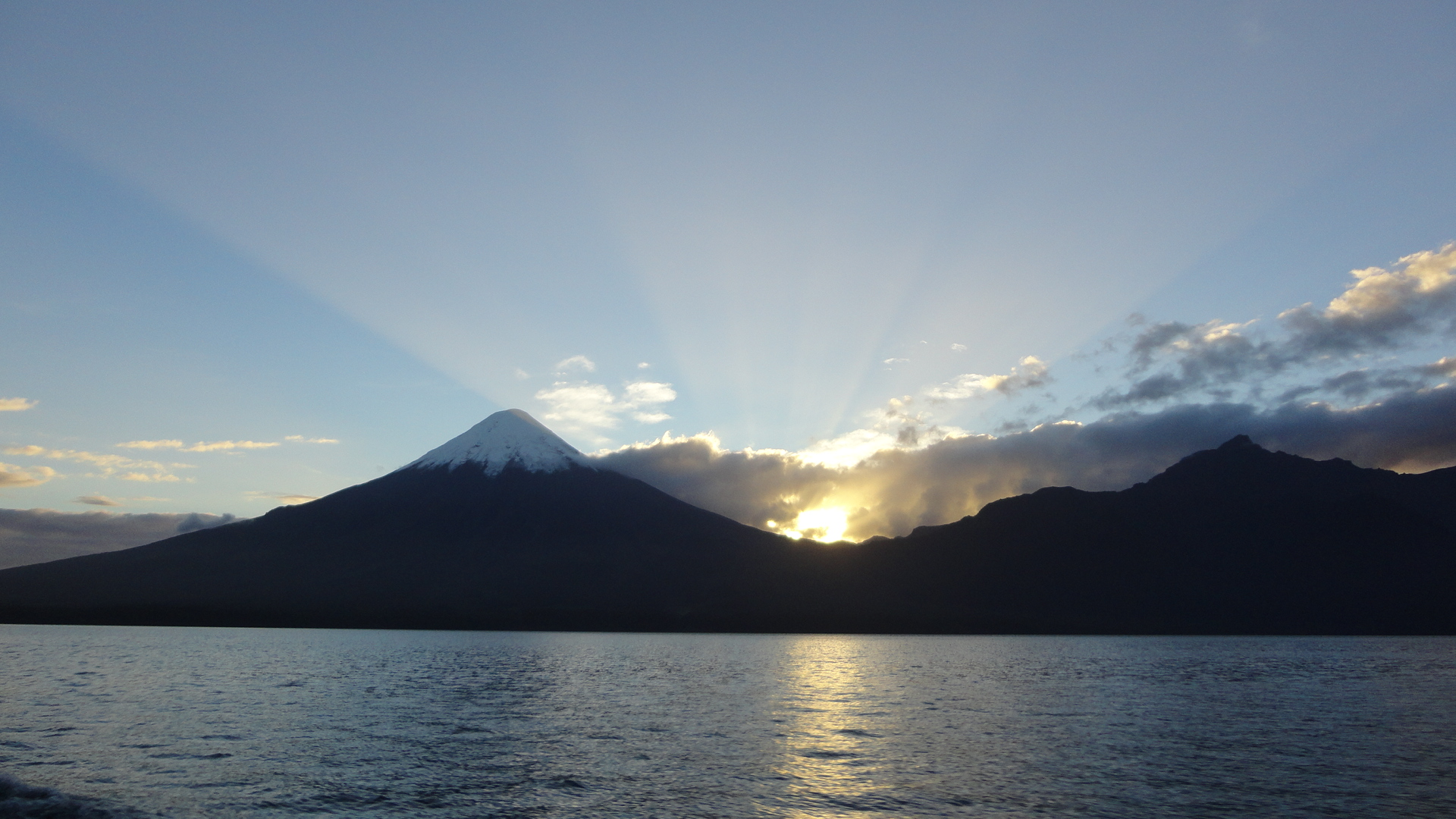
Dawn over Llanquihue Lake

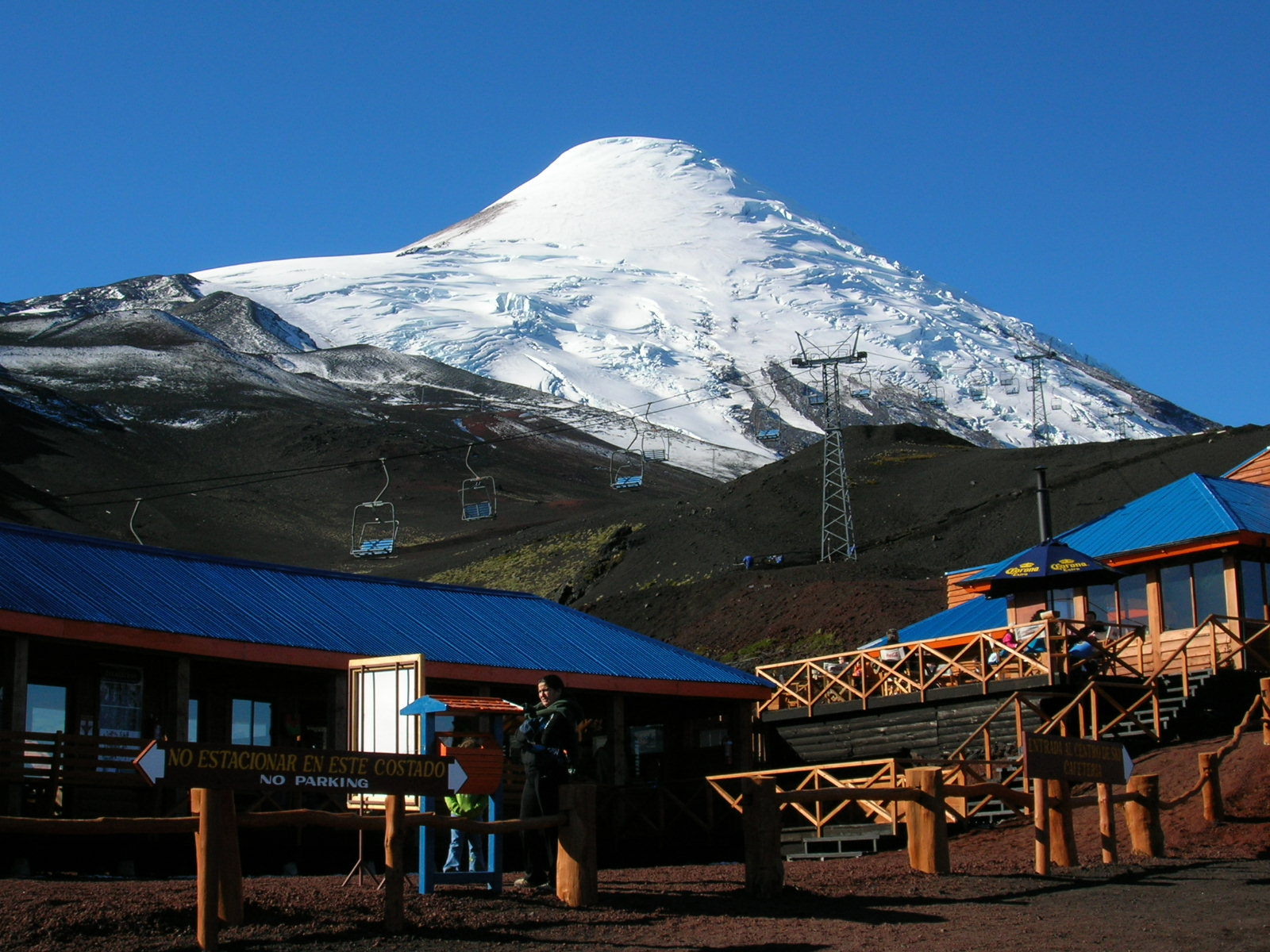
La Burbuja Ski Center

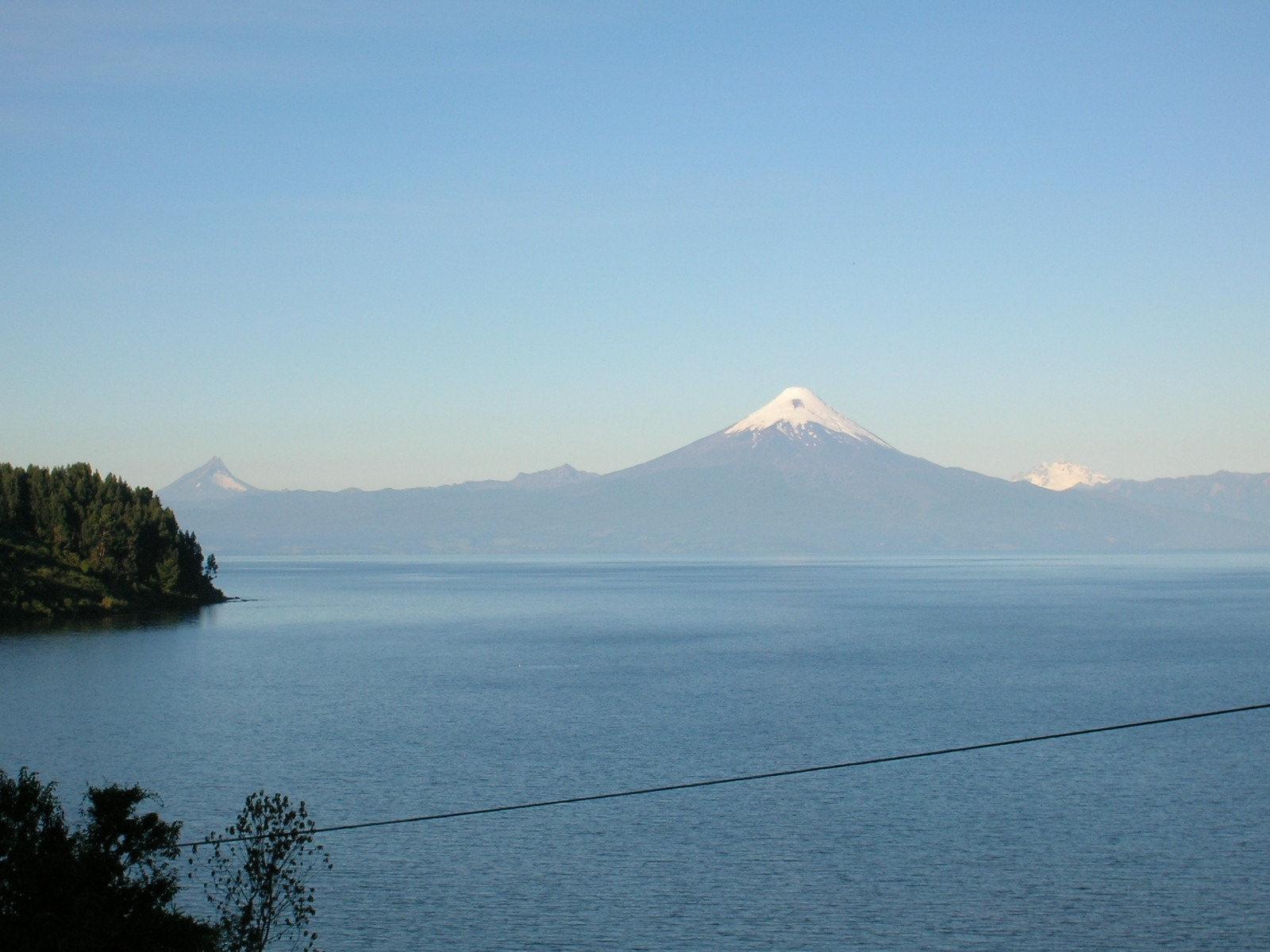
Llanquihue Lake and Osorno Volcano, Puerto Varas
