= St Joseph's Boys =

St Joseph's Boys is the name of:

- St Joseph's Boys' High School, Bangalore, school in India
- St Joseph's Boys' School, school in Northern Ireland
- St. Joseph's Boys' Higher Secondary School, Kozhikode, school in India
- St Joseph's Boys' High School, Newry, school in Northern Ireland
- St Joseph's Boys' High School, Pune, school in India
- St. Joseph's Boys' College, Nugegoda, school in Sri Lanka
