= Nueva Braunau =

Coordinates: 41.3248°S 73.0829°W

- Town (Pueblo)
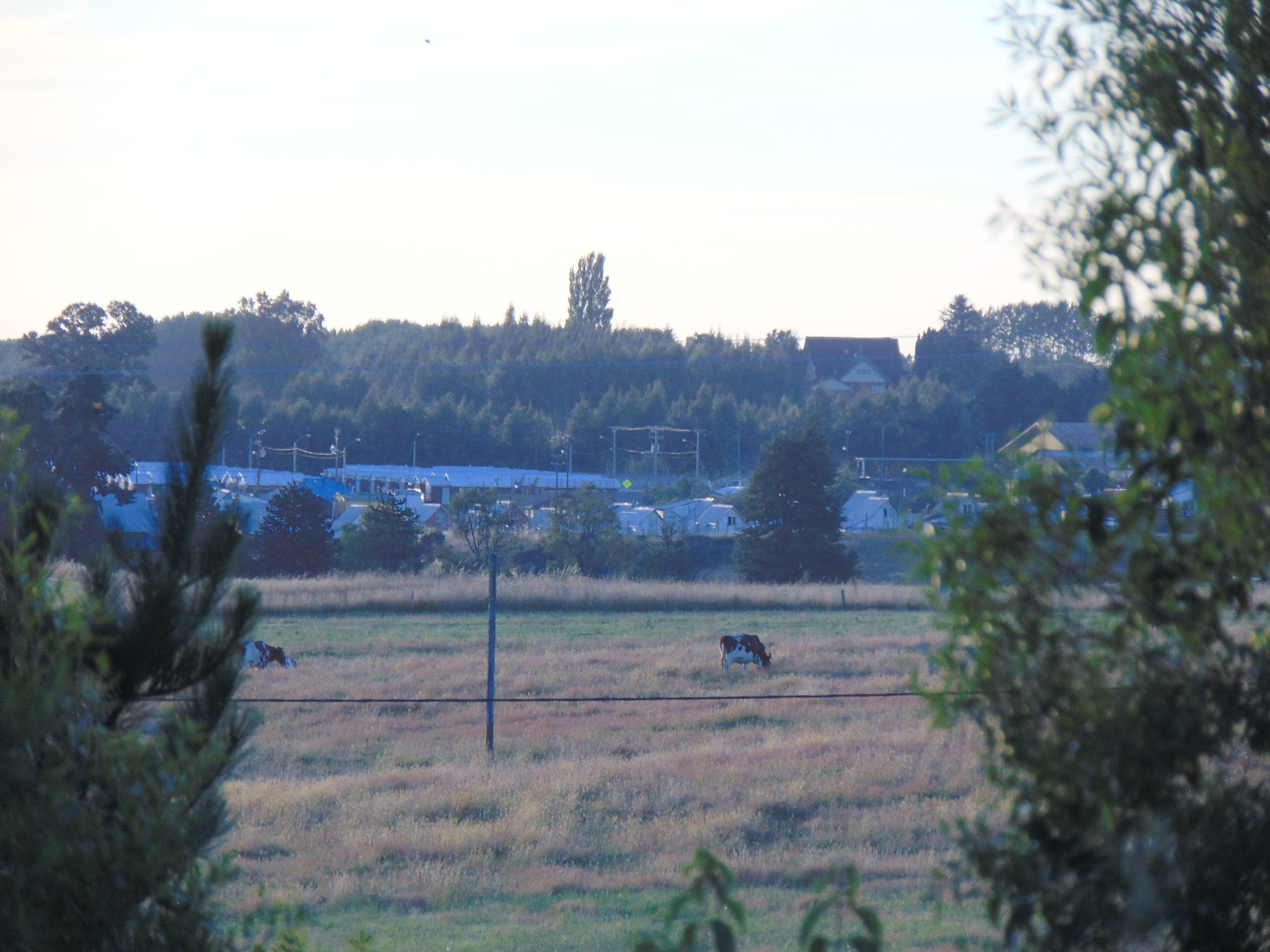
- Nueva Braunau seen from the east
- Interactive map of Nueva Braunau
- Country: Chile
- Region: Los Lagos
- Province: Llanquihue
- Commune: Puerto Varas
- Established: 1877

Population (2017)
  - Total: 3,290

Nueva Braunau (lit. New Braunau) is a Chilean village located in the commune of Puerto Varas, Southern Chile. It was founded mostly by Austro-Hungarian settlers (later called as Sudeten Germans) from Braunau, Bohemia (current Czech Republic) on 15 August 1877. The settlement originated as part of the German colonization of Valdivia, Osorno and Llanquihue.
