= St Joseph's Boys' High School, Newry =

Coordinates: 54.185°N 6.340°W

St Joseph's Boys' High School
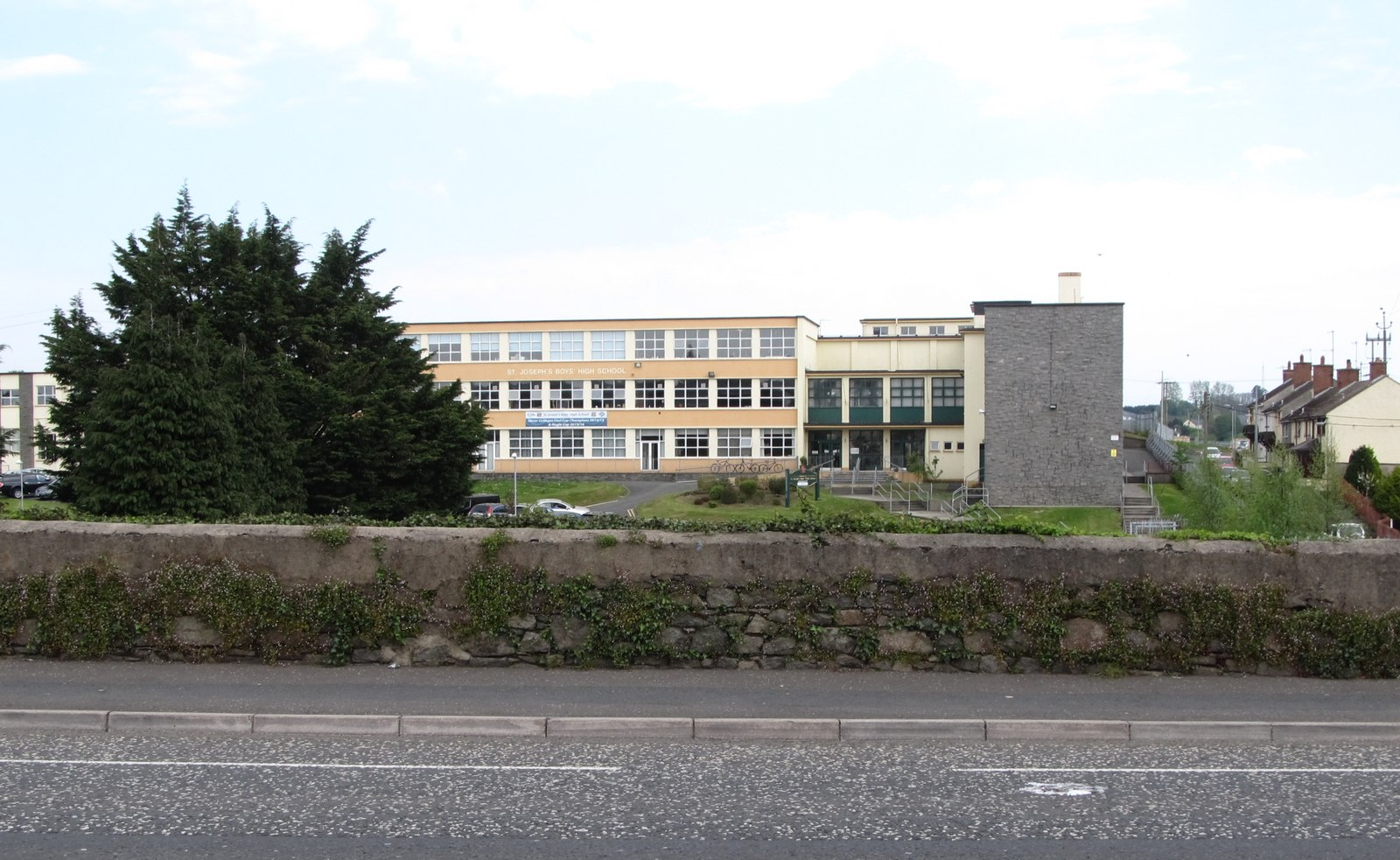
- School badge St Joseph's Boys High School building on Plunkett Street

Location
- Armagh Road; Newry, County Armagh, BT35 6DH; Northern Ireland

Information
- Type: 11–18 boys secondary school
- Motto: Vir Justus (Latin: "A just and honourable man")
- Religious affiliation: Roman Catholic
- Established: 1958
- Local authority: Education Authority (Southern)
- Principal: Ms J Muckian
- Gender: Boys
- Age: 11 to 16
- Enrolment: 400 (2023–2024)
- Colour
- Website: St Joseph's Boys' High School

St Joseph's Boys' High School is an 11–18 boys secondary school in Newry, Northern Ireland. It was founded in 1958 and is a Roman Catholic maintained school within the Southern Education and Library Board area. The school is on the A28 Armagh Road, on the County Armagh side of the Newry River.

== History ==
Having been established in 1958, St Joseph's Boys' High School has provided Roman Catholic education for boys aged 11–16 in the Newry community since. In September 2015, a new Principal of St Joseph's Boys' High School, Declan Murray, was appointed.

== Background ==
=== Context ===
St Joseph's Boys' High School is Roman Catholic boys secondary school in Newry, Northern Ireland, which attracts most of its pupil intake from the area in and around Newry. Upon entry to St Joseph's Boys' High School, all boys are required to participate in a funded programme of music tuition. One half of the schools pupils were entitled to Free School Meals (FSME) in 2014, with 41% of boys attending the school having been identified as having at least one special educational need. To support Additional Support Needs (ASN), provision at St Joseph's Boys' High School include a Learning Support Centre which can accommodate 29 boys aged between 11–16 years old.

=== Curriculum ===
The Curriculum offered at the school is split into Key Stage 3 and Key Stage 4.

==== Key Stage 3 ====
===== Areas of Learning =====
- English
- Maths
- Science & Technology
- Religious Education (RE)
- Environment & Society
- Learning for Life & Work
- Modern Languages
- Physical Education (PE)
- The Arts

===== Subject Strands =====
- English
- Maths
- Science, Technology, Design, ICT
- Geography and History
- Employability, Home Economics, Citizenship, Personal Development
- Irish
- Art & Design, Music and Drama

==== Key Stage 4 ====
===== Areas of Learning =====
- Language and Literacy
- Maths
- Science & Technology
- Religious Education (RE)
- Environment and Society
- Learning for Life & Work
- Modern Languages
- Physical Education
- The Arts

===== Subject Strands =====
- English Language
- Maths, Further Maths
- Double & Single Award Science, Technology & Design, ICT, ICDL
- GCSE Religion, OCN Religion
- Business Studies, Geography
- Employability
- Irish
- GCSE PE
- Music, Art & Design

=== Intake of boys ===
At the most recent government recorded inspection, 12% of boys attending the school were "newcomers", with a small percentage of boys from the gypsy travelling community attending the school.

St Joseph's Boys' High School
| Year | Intake (Year 8) | Enrolment No. | Attendance Average |
|---|---|---|---|
| 2011–2012 | 66 Boys | 416 Boys | 92% |
| 2012–2013 | 77 Boys ▲ | 394 Boys ▲ | 91.9% ▼ |
| 2013–2014 | 71 Boys ▼ | 384 Boys ▼ | 93% ▲ |
| 2014–2015 | 70 Boys ▼ | 382 Boys ▼ | Data Unavailable |
| 2021-2022 | 85 Boys ▲ | 434 Boys ▲ | 87% ▼ |
| 2022-2023 | 63 Boys ▼ | 432 Boys ▼ | Data Unavailable |
| 2023-2024 | 85 Boys ▲ | 436 Boys ▲ | 89% ▲ |
| 2024-2025 | 66 Boys ▼ | 400 Boys ▼ | Data Unavailable |

=== Attainment levels ===
Data collated in 2014 highlighted that roughly one–half of boys attending St Joseph's Boys' High School at entry had attained the expected government standards in English and Mathematics, lower than the average figure for non–selective schools in Northern Ireland.

An inspection report by the Education and Training Inspectorate in 2014, the school was said to have pupils who were confident, courteous and had high levels of self–esteem and that the boys were visibly proud of their school and community. Such characteristics were reflected in the schools praise for academic results and achievement in a variety of subject areas, including ICT and numeracy, as well as recognised standards set in literacy. The 2014 inspection concluded that above 90% of boys attending the school at that time were found to be making better or at least the expected progress in Key Stage 3 Numeracy and Mathematics, whilst acknowledging that boys continue to attain well within numeracy and mathematics at Key Stage 4.

Academic achievement and attainment in Literacy and English was lower than attainment in Numeracy and Mathematics, with an average of 75% –90% of boys developing effective oral and written communication skills. Between 2011–2014, roughly one–half of boys were entered for GCSE English examinations and attained in line with, or above, the expected government target for similar schools in Northern Ireland. Boys who were not presented for examination for GCSE English were entered for alternative qualifications, such as Level 2 skills qualifications in Literacy, instead.

Attainment in public examinations, just under three–quarters of boys presented for examinations achievement five or more GCSE level qualifications, in line with the expectations set by the Northern Ireland Executive, and St Joseph's Boys' High School's attainment levels in public examinations were found to be 10% above the average for attainment against all other boys in similar schools across Northern Ireland.

==== GCSE qualifications ====
===== 2012 =====
Percentage of Year 12 boys achieving 5 or more GCSEs (2012)
| Overview | Year | St Joseph's Boys' High School result |
|---|---|---|
| At least 5 subjects (taking) | 2012 | 97% |
| obtaining Grades C or above in at least 5 subjects | 2012 | 64% |
| obtaining Grades C or above in at least 5 subjects including GCSE English and GCSE Mathematics | 2012 | 33% |
| Year 12 obtaining Grades E or above in at least 5 subjects | 2012 | 87% |

===== 2013 =====
Percentage of Year 12 boys achieving 5 or more GCSEs (2013)
| Overview | Year | St Joseph's Boys' High School result |
|---|---|---|
| At least 5 subjects (taking) | 2013 | 100% |
| obtaining Grades C or above in at least 5 subjects | 2013 | 71% |
| obtaining Grades C or above in at least 5 subjects including GCSE English and GCSE Mathematics | 2013 | 33% |
| Year 12 obtaining Grades E or above in at least 5 subjects | 2013 | 90% |

===== 2014 =====
Percentage of Year 12 boys achieving 5 or more GCSEs (2014)
| Overview | Year | St Joseph's Boys' High School result |
|---|---|---|
| At least 5 subjects (taking) | 2014 | 98% |
| obtaining Grades C or above in at least 5 subjects | 2014 | 71% |
| obtaining Grades C or above in at least 5 subjects including GCSE English and GCSE Mathematics | 2014 | 35% |
| Year 12 obtaining Grades E or above in at least 5 subjects | 2014 | 87% |

== See also ==
- Education in Northern Ireland
- Catholic education (disambiguation)
- Single-sex education
- Department of Education (Northern Ireland)
