= Catholic education =

Catholic education may refer to:

- Catholic school, primary and secondary education organised by the Roman Catholic Church or affiliated organisations
- Catholic higher education, higher education run by the Catholic Church or affiliated organisations
- Seminary, a training school for students to become priests
- Doctor of Sacred Theology, an academic degree in Catholic theology
- Doctor of Canon Law, an academic degree in interpreting Canon law of the Catholic Church

== See also ==
- Catholic education in Australia
- History of Catholic education in the United States
- List of Catholic seminaries
