= San Javier railway station =

Railway station in San Javier, Chile

Coordinates: 34°59′0.307″S 71°14′47.936″W

Estación San Javier

General information
- Location: José Manuel Balmaceda Ave. with General Barboza., San Javier; Chile
- Owner: Empresa de los Ferrocarriles del Estado
- Line: Red Sur EFE
- Tracks: 2

History
- Opened: 1874

Services
Preceding station	Empresa de los Ferrocarriles del Estado	Following station
Talca towards Santiago	TerraSur	Linares towards Chillán
Talca towards Curicó	Curicó-Linares	Linares Terminus
Former services
Preceding station	Empresa de los Ferrocarriles del Estado	Following station
Talca towards Santiago	Expreso Maule 2012-2015	Linares Terminus
Location

Estación San Javier, is a railway station of the Empresa de los Ferrocarriles del Estado, located in San Javier, Chile. It is located on José Manuel Balmaceda Ave. at General Barboza.

Estación San Javier is part of the Red Sur EFE, the TerraSur inter-city service has a stop here.

This station is between Ruta 5 and East Downtown San Javier.

In 2001, Estación San Javier began to take passengers.

== Lines and trains ==
The following lines and trains pass through or terminate at Estación San Javier:

- Red Sur EFE
  - TerraSur inter-city service (Alameda - Estación Chillán)
  - Expreso Maule inter-city service (Alameda - Estación Linares)
