= Molina railway station =

Railway station in Molina, Chile

Coordinates: 34°59′0.307″S 71°14′47.936″W

Estación Molina

General information
- Location: Luis Cruz Martinez Av., Molina; Chile
- Owner: Empresa de los Ferrocarriles del Estado
- Line: Red Sur EFE
- Tracks: 2

History
- Opened: 1874

Services
Preceding station	Empresa de los Ferrocarriles del Estado	Following station
Curicó towards Santiago	TerraSur	Talca towards Chillán
Curicó Terminus	Curicó-Linares	Talca towards Linares
Former services
Preceding station	Empresa de los Ferrocarriles del Estado	Following station
Curicó towards Santiago	Expreso Maule 2012-2015	Talca towards Linares
Location

Estación Molina, is a railway station of the Empresa de los Ferrocarriles del Estado, located in Molina, Chile. It is located on Luis Cruz Martinez avenue.

Estación Molina is part of the Red Sur EFE, the TerraSur inter-city service has a stop here. This station is between Ruta 5 and downtown Molina.

In February 2010, Estacion Molina was damaged in the 2010 Chile earthquake. Later that same year the station began to take passengers.

== Lines and trains ==
The following lines and trains pass through or terminate at Estación Molina:

- Red Sur EFE
  - TerraSur inter-city service (Alameda - Estación Chillán)
  - Expreso Maule inter-city service (Alameda - Estación Linares)

== See also ==
- La Calera railway station
