= San Bernardo railway station (Chile) =

Railway station in San Bernardo, Chile

Estación San Bernardo
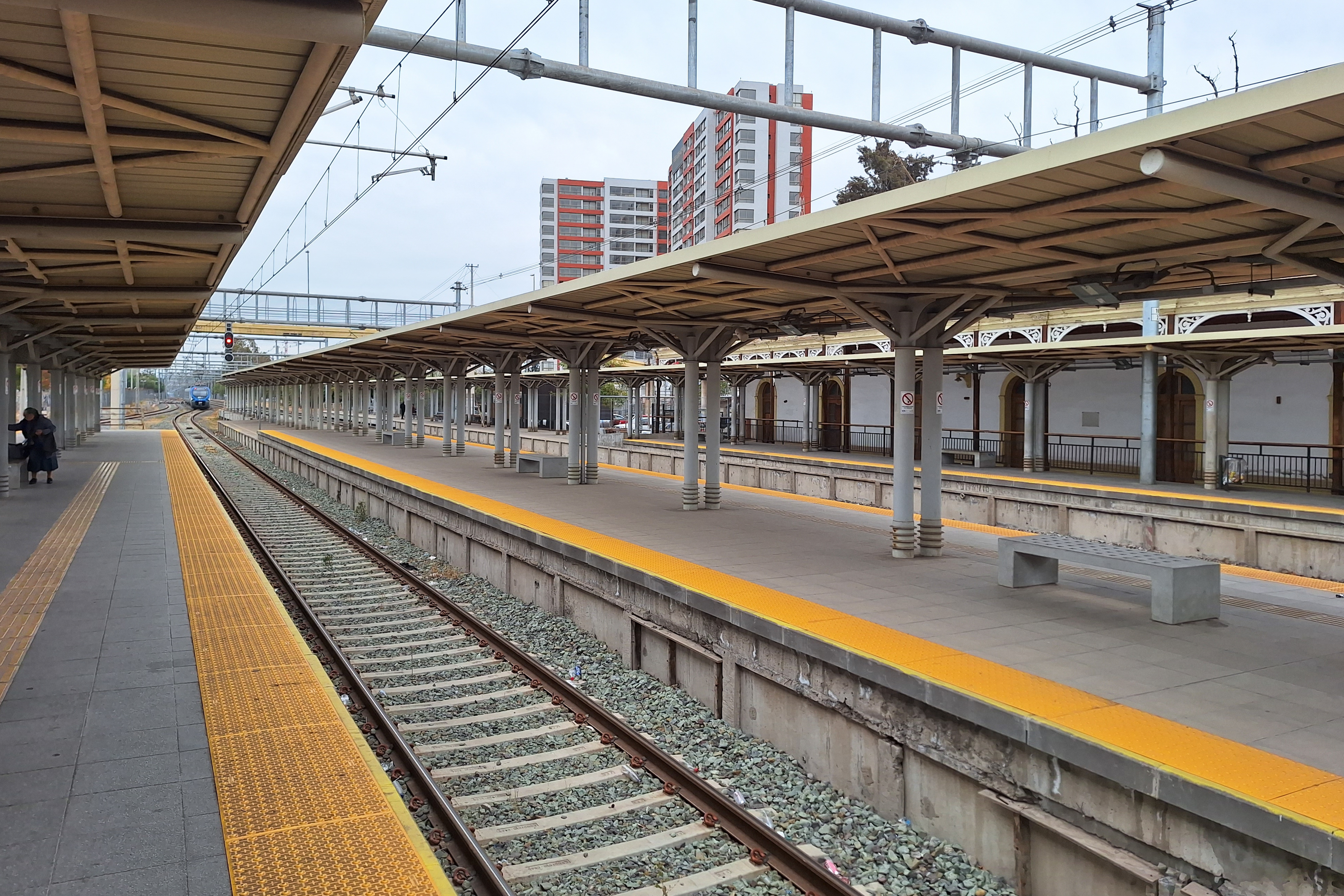
- Platforms at Estación San Bernardo

General information
- Location: Baquedano 560, San Bernardo, Chile
- Coordinates: 33°35′42.565″S 70°41′53.023″W
- Owner: Empresa de los Ferrocarriles del Estado
- Line: Red Sur EFE
- Tracks: 4

Construction
- Platform levels: 2

History
- Opened: 1857

Services
Preceding station	Empresa de los Ferrocarriles del Estado	Following station
Santiago Terminus	TerraSur	Rancagua towards Chillán
Santiago Terminus	Santiago-San Fernando	Buin Zoo towards San Fernando
Pedro Aguirre Cerda towards Santiago	Santiago-Rancagua	Maestranza towards Rancagua
Pedro Aguirre Cerda towards Santiago	Santiago-Nos	Maestranza towards Nos
Location

San Bernardo is a railway station of the Empresa de los Ferrocarriles del Estado, located in San Bernardo, Chile. It is located on Baquedano street.

San Bernardo is part of the Red Sur EFE, and all passenger traffic stops here.

== Lines and trains ==
The following train services pass through San Bernardo:

- Red Sur EFE
  - TerraSur (inter-city rail) (Alameda - Chillán)
  - Metrotrén Rancagua (regional-commuter rail) (Alameda - Rancagua)
  - Metrotrén Nos (commuter rail) (Alameda - Nos)
