= Rancagua railway station =

Railway station in Rancagua, Chile

Estación Rancagua
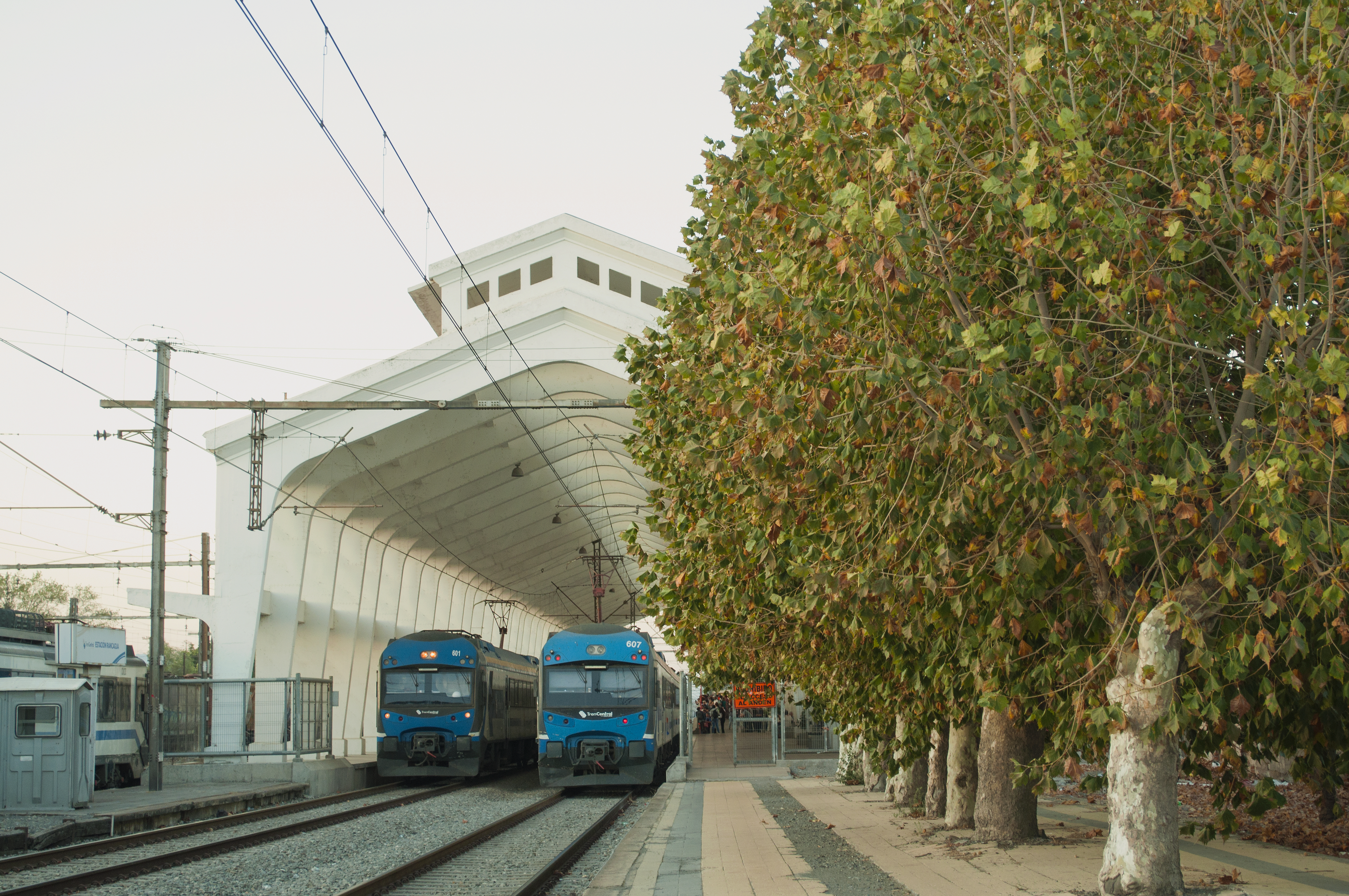

General information
- Location: Avenida Estación s/n, Rancagua, Chile
- Coordinates: 34°10′13.512″S 70°45′10.894″W
- Owner: Empresa de los Ferrocarriles del Estado
- Line: Red Sur EFE
- Tracks: 3

Services
Preceding station	Empresa de los Ferrocarriles del Estado	Following station
Graneros towards Santiago	TerraSur	Curicó towards Chillán
Graneros towards Santiago	Santiago-San Fernando	Rengo towards San Fernando
Graneros towards Santiago	Santiago-Rancagua	Terminus
Santiago Terminus	Alameda-Temuco Nighttime	Talca towards Temuco
Location

Estación Rancagua is a railway station of the Empresa de los Ferrocarriles del Estado in Rancagua, Chile. It is the main railway station in the Libertador General Bernardo O'Higgins Region. Estación Rancagua is part of the Red Sur EFE, the TerraSur inter-city service, and the Metrotrén commuter service stops here.

== Lines and trains ==
The following lines and trains pass through or terminate at Estación Rancagua:

- Red Sur EFE
  - TerraSur inter-city service (Alameda - Estación Chillán)
  - Metrotrén commuter service (Alameda - Estación San Fernando)

== Adjacent stations ==
←	Service	→
Estación San Bernardo	Red Sur EFE	Estación San Fernando
