= Constitución Railway Station (Chile) =

Railway station in Chile

Constitución Station Estación Constitución
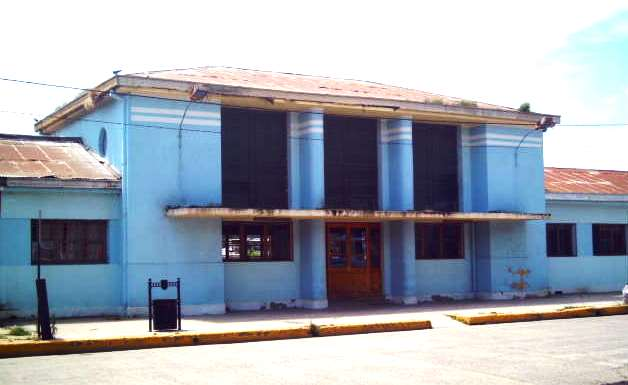

General information
- Location: Laureano Gonzalez 8 Maule Region; Chile
- Line: Tren Talca-Constitucion
- Train operators: Empresa de Ferrocariles del Estado

Construction
- Structure type: At-grade
Location

Constitucion Station is the Main Railway station serving the Chilean city of Constitucion in the country´s Maule Region. The station is the Terminus of the Tren Talca-Constitucion Service, operated by EFE, which is considered to be the last rural train service of Chile.
