= TerraSur =

Inter-city rail service in Chile

Tren Estación Central - Chillan

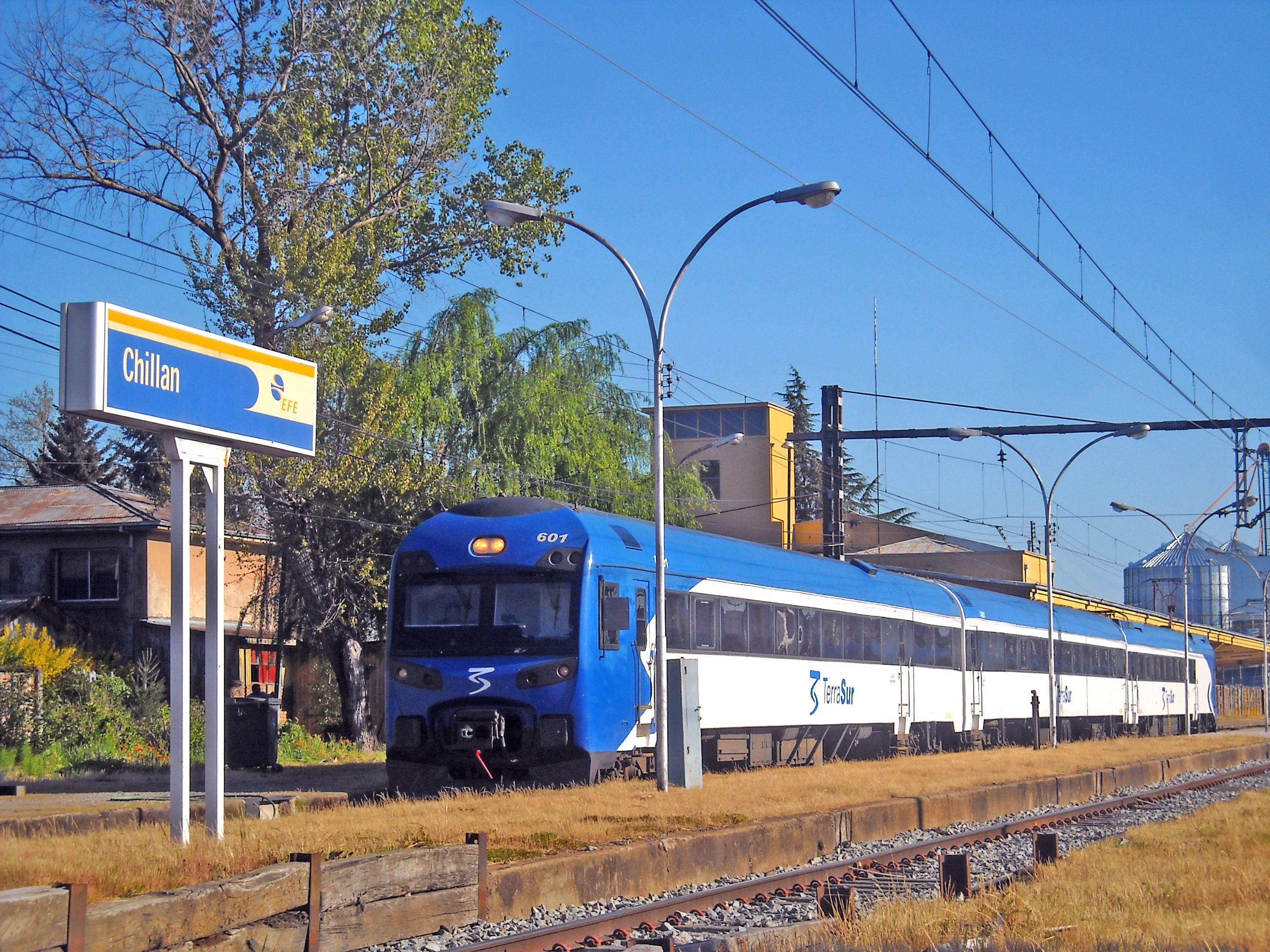
- Tren Estación Central - Chillan in Chillán

Overview
- Locale: Santiago, Ñuble
- Termini: Estación Alameda; Estación Chillán

Service
- Type: Inter-city rail
- Operator: Trenes Metropolitanos S.A.
- Rolling stock: UTS-444 series (601-610); 6 SFB-500 series

History
- Opened: 2001

Technical
- Line length: 397.6 km (247.06 mi)
- Track gauge: 1,676 mm (5 ft 6 in)
- Electrification: Overhead catenary
- Operating speed: 160 km/h (99 mph)

Tren Estación Central - Chillan (previously known as EFE Chillán or TerraSur) is a Chilean Inter-city rail service, opened in 2001 between Santiago and Chillán, on the Chilean Central Valley. It is operated by the Trenes Regionales Terra S.A., a subsidiary of the Empresa de los Ferrocarriles del Estado (EFE). Covering almost 400 km in less than 5 hours, it is the fastest public transportation between the two cities.

Currently it is one of the only inter-city services that still operates in the country, (the other intercity rail service is the Alameda-Temuco train, a seasonal train) and is the fastest rail service in South America, with an operational speed reaching 160 km/h.

Since June 2012, TerraSur has two daily services on each direction, between Santiago and Chillán, increasing to three on Mondays.

== Upgrade ==
In 2019, EFE announced its intention to launch a tender for the supply of six new rolling stock units capable of maximum speeds of 160 km/h. These new vehicles, along with the automation and upgrade of 74 level crossings will allow a journey time of 2 hours 40 minutes for express services between Santiago and Chillán, with intermediate stops at San Bernardo, Rancagua and Talca, and will allow the service to meet the international definition of Higher-speed rail, making it the first in South America. Along with a standard service consisting of ten intermediate stops, EFE plans to operate 12 daily round trips. The Electro-diesel trains are manufactured by CRRC Sifang. They consist of four cars and have 238 seats in one class.

In April 2023, the government and EFE presented two of the six trains that will be incorporated into the fleet shortening the five-hour trip to three hours and 40 minutes.

In January 20, 2024, Chilean authorities inaugurated the South American country's fastest train service initially connecting Santiago with Curicó in two hours and three minutes. Four months later, the service was extended to Chillán.

== Rolling Stock ==
TerraSur uses as its long time flagship rolling stock the Spanish made UTS-444 series EMUs formerly of Renfe, that hold the driver's cabin and the pantograph, with one Renfe 10000 Series passenger coach in the middle of each consist.

Since 2023, TerraSur operates Chinese manufactured SFB-500 bimode multiple units in four car configuration.

== Accommodations ==
The UTS EMUs consists of 2 types of accommodations:

- Coach Class (standard class) (reserved seating): Car with 74 passenger capacity, sliding seats, arranged in rows (2+2), with a central aisle, facing each other at the centre, in a way that 50% of the seats are arranged to be facing to the rear of the train.
- Business Class (first class) (reserved seating): Car with 35 passenger capacity, reclining booths to 140°, arranged in rows (2+1), with an aisle at the centre and facing each other, 50% of the seats are facing the front of the train and the other 50% are facing the rear of the train.

The SFB-500 BMUs operate coach class only seats with a restaurant-lounge section in one of the cars.

== Stations ==
Station	City	Distance (km) (from Alameda)	Transfers
Alameda	Estación Central, Santiago	0.0	Santiago Metro: Line 1 Estación Central (Metro)
San Bernardo	San Bernardo, Santiago	16.0	Metrotrén Nos and Metrotrén Rancagua
Rancagua	Rancagua, O'Higgins	81.8	(none)
San Fernando	San Fernando, O'Higgins	133.8	(none)
Curicó	Curicó, Maule	185.8	(none)
Molina	Molina, Maule	199.8	(none)
Talca	Talca, Maule	249.3	Ramal Talca-Constitución: Tren Regional Buscarril (Constitución)
San Javier	San Javier, Maule	269.4	(none)
Linares	Linares, Maule	299.9	(none)
Parral	Parral, Maule	339.2	(none)
San Carlos	San Carlos, Ñuble	373.2	(none)
Chillán	Chillán, Ñuble	397.6	(none)
