= Şefik =

Şefik is both a Turkish masculine given name and a surname, derived from the Arabic name Shafik. Notable people with the name include:

- Şefik Abalı (born 2002), Austrian footballer
- Şefik Aker (1877–1964), Ottoman and Turkish army officer
- Šefik Bešlagić (1908–1990), Bosnia and Herzegovina historian
- Şefik Birkiye (born 1954), Turkish-Belgian architect
- Şefik Can (1909–2005), Turkish spiritual leader
- Şefik Yılmaz Dizdar (born 1939), Turkish businessman
- Šefik Džaferović (born 1957), Bosnian politician
- Şefik Kamil Efes (1899—1988), Turkish banker
- Şefik Avni Özüdoğru (1884–1960), Turkish officer

== Middle name and surname ==
- Ahmet Sefik Mithat Pasha (1822–1883), Ottoman politician, reformist and statesman
- Denis Šefik (born 1976), Serbian water polo player
- Süleyman Şefik Pasha, Turkish military officer
