= Talca railway station =

Railway station in Talca, Chile

Estación Talca
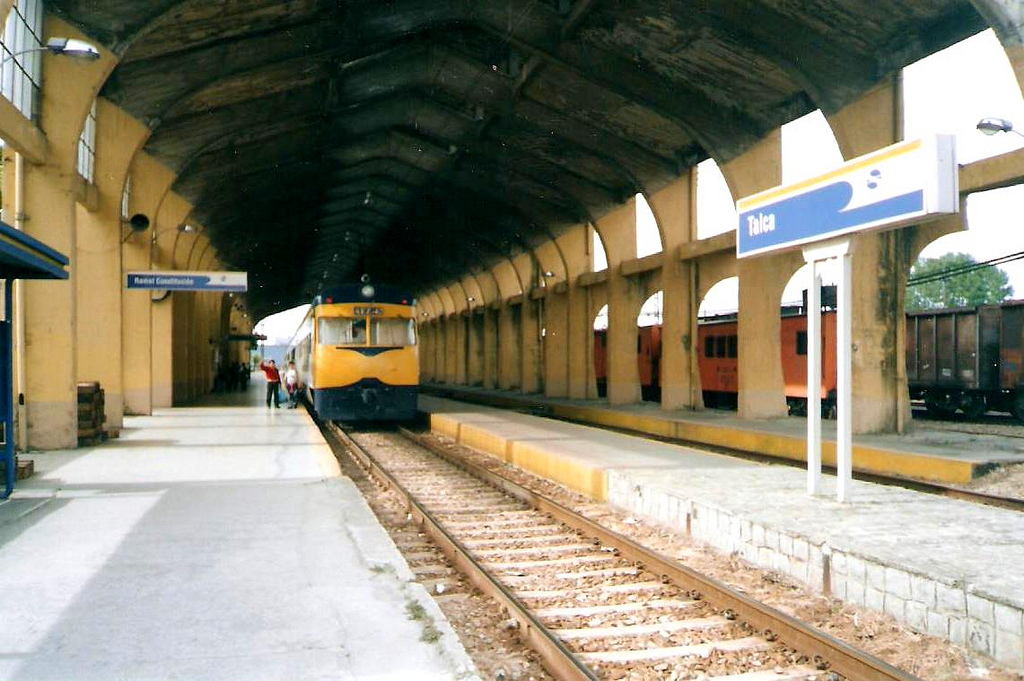

General information
- Location: Avenida 11 Oriente 1000, Talca, Chile
- Coordinates: 35°25′45.89″S 71°38′59.266″W
- Owner: Empresa de los Ferrocarriles del Estado
- Lines: Red Sur EFE, Ramal Talca-Constitutión Buscarril
- Tracks: 3

History
- Opened: 1874

Services
Preceding station	Empresa de los Ferrocarriles del Estado	Following station
Molina towards Santiago	TerraSur	San Javier towards Chillán
Molina towards Curicó	Curicó-Linares	San Javier towards Linares
Curicó Daytime towards Santiago	Alameda-Temuco	Chillán towards Temuco
Rancagua Nighttime towards Santiago	Alameda-Temuco	Chillán towards Temuco
Colín towards Constitución	Ramal Talca-Constitución	Terminus
Former services
Preceding station	Empresa de los Ferrocarriles del Estado	Following station
Molina towards Santiago	Expreso Maule 2012-2015	San Javier towards Linares
Location

Estación Talca is a railway station of the Empresa de los Ferrocarriles del Estado, located in Talca, Chile. It is the main railway station in the Maule Region. It is located on 11 Oriente avenue. Estación Talca is part of the Red Sur EFE, the TerraSur and the Expreso Maule inter-city services have a stop here. The nearby Talca Bus Terminal is within walking distance from the Station.

The first section was constructed and opened in 1982. The most recent section was constructed on 1915, leading into stations in Manquehua and Constitución.

== Lines and trains ==
The following lines and trains pass through or terminate at Estación Talca:

- Red Sur EFE
  - TerraSur inter-city service (Alameda - Chillán)
  - Expreso Maule inter-city service (Alameda - Linares)
- Ramal Constitución
  - Tren Regional Buscarril (Estación Talca - Estación Constitución)

== Adjacent stations ==
←	Service	→
Estación Molina	Red Sur EFE	Estación San Javier
Estación Colín	Ramal Constitución	Terminus
