= Efes =

Efes may refer to:

- Anadolu Efes S.K., a Turkish basketball club
- Efes Beverage Group, a Turkish beer company
- Efes Daromi, third-century Talmudic scholar
- Ephesus, an ancient Greek city sited in modern-day Turkey
- Efes exercise, Turkish military exercise
- Nilgün Efes, Turkish entrepreneur and journalist
- Şefik Kamil Efes, Turkish banker and businessperson

== See also ==
- Efe (disambiguation)
