= Rengo Station =

Railway station in Chile

Rengo Station Estacion Rengo
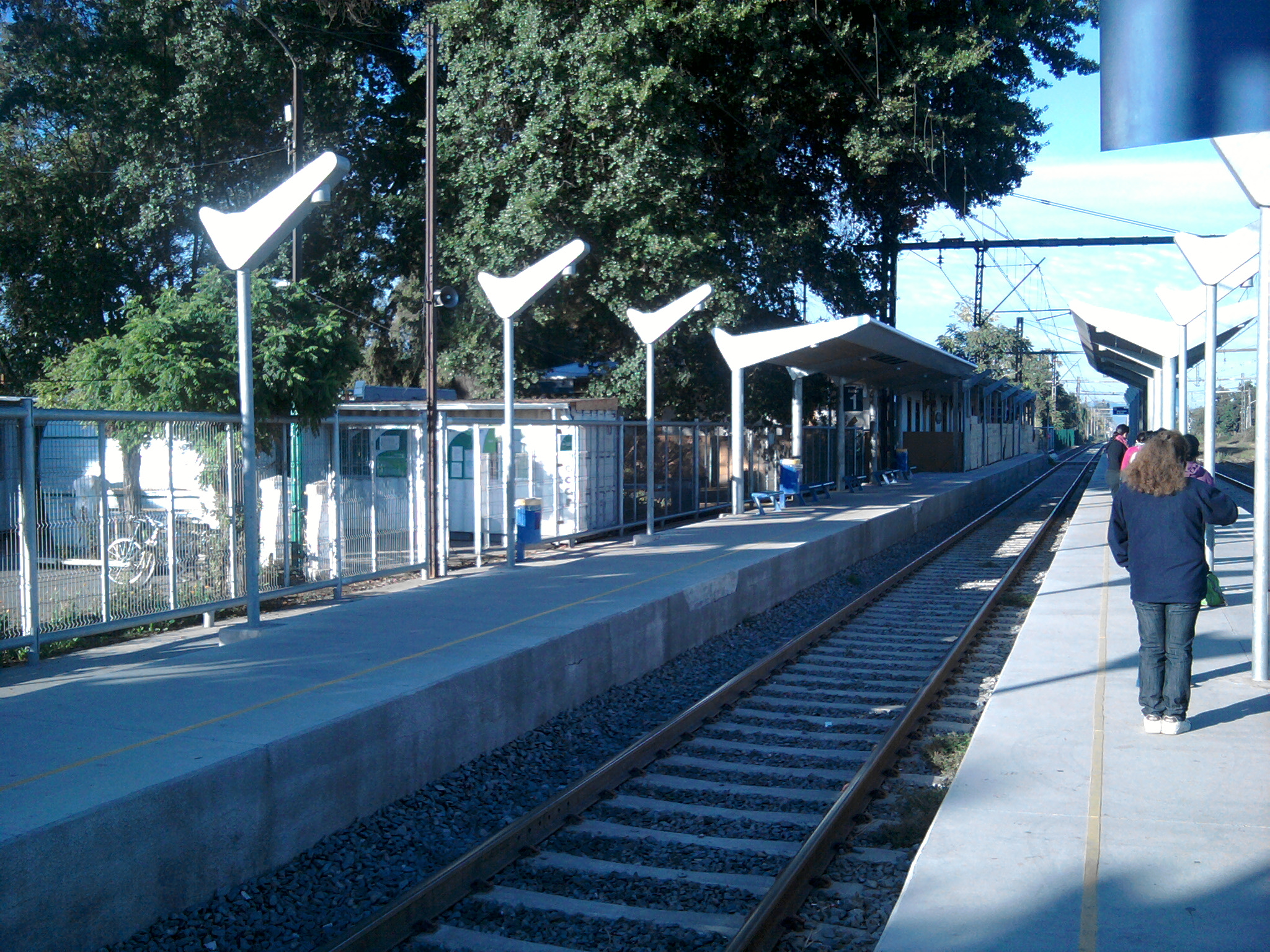

General information
- Location: Jose Bisquet Avenue; Bernardo O´Higgins Region; Chile

Construction
- Structure type: At-grade

History
- Opened: 1862
Location

Rengo Station is a railway station servicing the city of Rengo, in the O'Higgins Region of Chile. Its only service currently is the Tren San Fernando–Estacion Central line.

== History ==
The station was opened in 1862, and 10 years later a tram service was begun to connect it to Rengo's main square. The station was closed due to a fall in regular services, but was reopened in 2001 as part of the Metrotrén service. In 2017, station stopped being a stop on the metrotren System until 2021, when the Tren San Fernando-Estacion Central line was inaugurated.
