= Efe =

Efe or EFE may refer to:

- Efe (name), male given name and surname

== People ==
- Efé people, an ethnic group in the Democratic Republic of the Congo
- Efe (zeybek), leaders of Turkish outlaws and soldiers
- Efe (musician) (born 1993), Nigerian musician and media personality

== Science and engineering ==
- 2-oxoglutarate dioxygenase (ethylene-forming)
- 2-oxoglutarate/L-arginine monooxygenase/decarboxylase (succinate-forming)
- Early fuel evaporator
- Einstein field equations
- Endocardial fibroelastosis, a heart condition in young children
- External field effect in Modified Newtonian dynamics

== Other uses ==
- Efe, one of the nine default skins in the game Minecraft.
- EFE, a Spanish news agency
- Edelman Financial Engines, a financial planning and investment advisory company
- Efe language
- Empresa de Ferrocarriles Ecuatorianos, the national railway of Ecuador
- Empresa de los Ferrocarriles del Estado, the national railway of Chile
- Exclusive First Editions, a British die-cast bus model manufacturer
- Trofeo EFE, a Spanish football award
