= Ethylene-forming enzyme =

Ethylene-forming enzyme may refer to:

- 2-oxoglutarate dioxygenase (ethylene-forming)
- 2-oxoglutarate/L-arginine monooxygenase/decarboxylase (succinate-forming)
- 1-Aminocyclopropane-1-carboxylic acid (ACC) oxidase
