= FEPASA =

FEPASA may refer to:

- Ferrovia Paulista S/A, in Brazil. Railway company, owned by the State of São Paulo, between 1971 and 1998, when it was incorporated into RFFSA, privatized and nowadays operated by América Latina Logística
- Ferrocarril del Pacífico, in Chile
- Ferrocarriles del Paraguay S.A., national railway company of Paraguay established in 2002
