= Tren Estación Central-Melipilla =

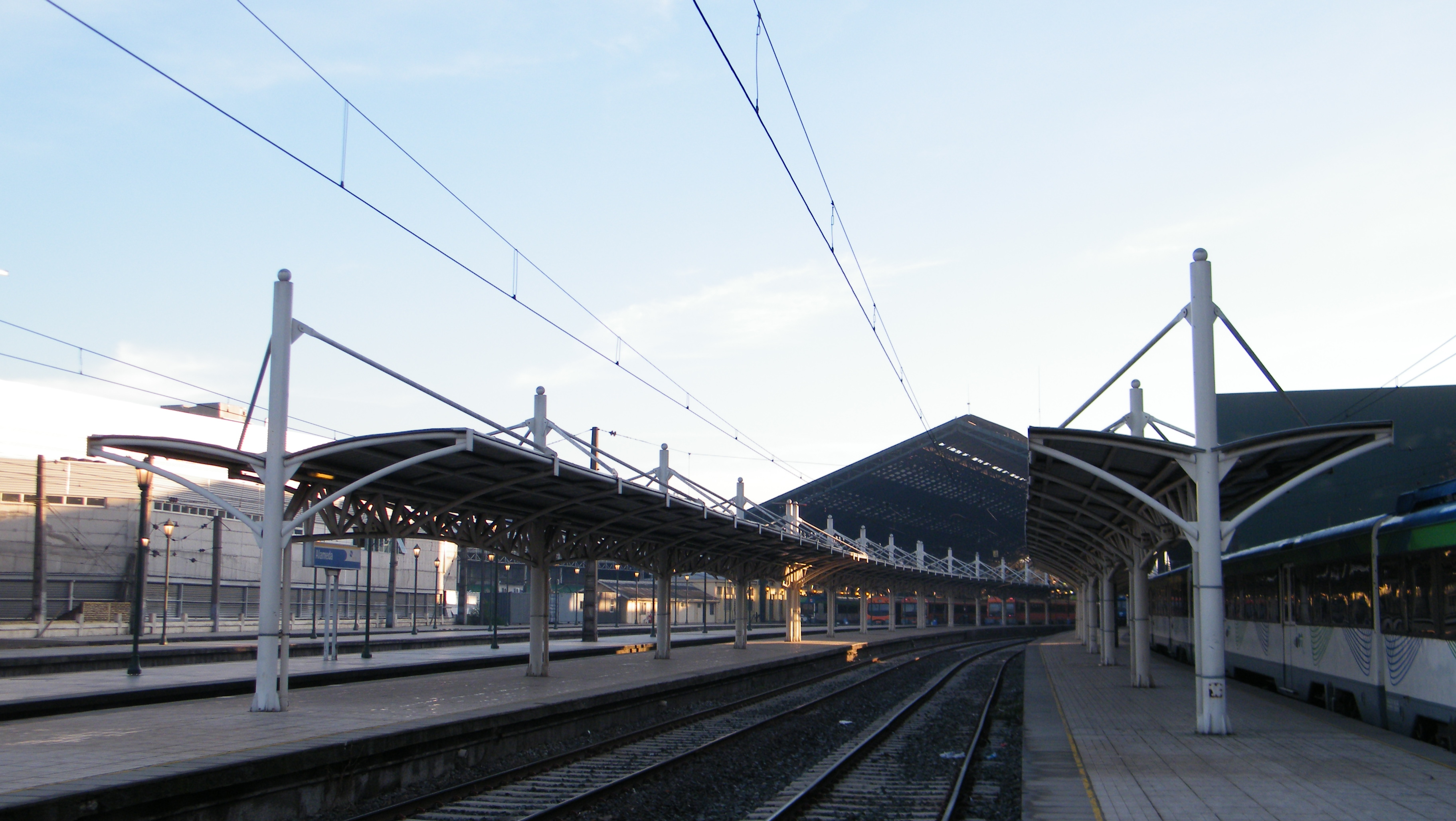
- Reserved platforms for the line in Estación Central

Overview
- Locale: Santiago, Melipilla
- Termini: Estación Alameda; Estación Melipilla
- Stations: 12

Service
- Type: Commuter rail
- Operator: EFE
- Ridership: 60 million a year (estimated)

History
- Planned opening: 2027

Technical
- Line length: 61 km (37.90 mi)
- Operating speed: 120 km/h (75 mph)
Route map

The Tren Estación Central-Melipilla is a planned 61 km commuter railway line in the Chilean capital of Santiago, designed to link it with neighbouring town Melipilla, to be operated by Empresa de los Ferrocarriles del Estado.

== Background ==
EFE had been planning a suburban service between Santiago and Melipilla since the mid-1990s. The project got to the tendering stage, but there were no bidders due to an underestimated budget requirement and disagreements between EFE and Santiago Metro over the location of the city centre terminal. However the first stage as far as Malloco formed part of the company's 2014-16 development plan. Yet, works were not initiated, one problem being an inability to obtain environmental approval. In May 2019, environmental approval was granted for the project to introduce a commuter rail service running 25km from Santiago to Malloco on the line to Melipilla. Construction of this first stage is due to begin in 2020 and open in 2025, at a cost of US$1.56 billion.

In July 2025, it was reported that a three year subcontract with an estimated value of €100mn had been awarded to a consortium to construct the second stretch of 21.5km. This would include dismantling the current track and supplying track, sleepers, ballast and overhead lines for the new suburban railway which will feature three new tracks - two for passenger and one for freight services.

== Stations ==
Stations	Transfers	Location	Opened	Commune
Alameda	Estación Central		2029	Estación Central
Estación Central 2			2029	Estación Central
Lo Errázuriz	Lo Errázuriz		2027	Cerrillos
Américo Vespucio			2027	Cerrillos
Pajaritos			2027	Maipú
Tres Poniente			2027	Maipú
Ciudad Satélite			2027	Maipú
Padre Hurtado			2027	Padre Hurtado
Malloco			2027	Malloco
Talagante			2029	Talagante
El Monte			2029	El Monte
Melipilla			2029	Melipilla

== See also ==
- Metrotren
- Santiago-Batuco commuter rail
