= San Fernando railway station (Chile) =

Railway station in San Fernando, Chile

Estación San Fernando
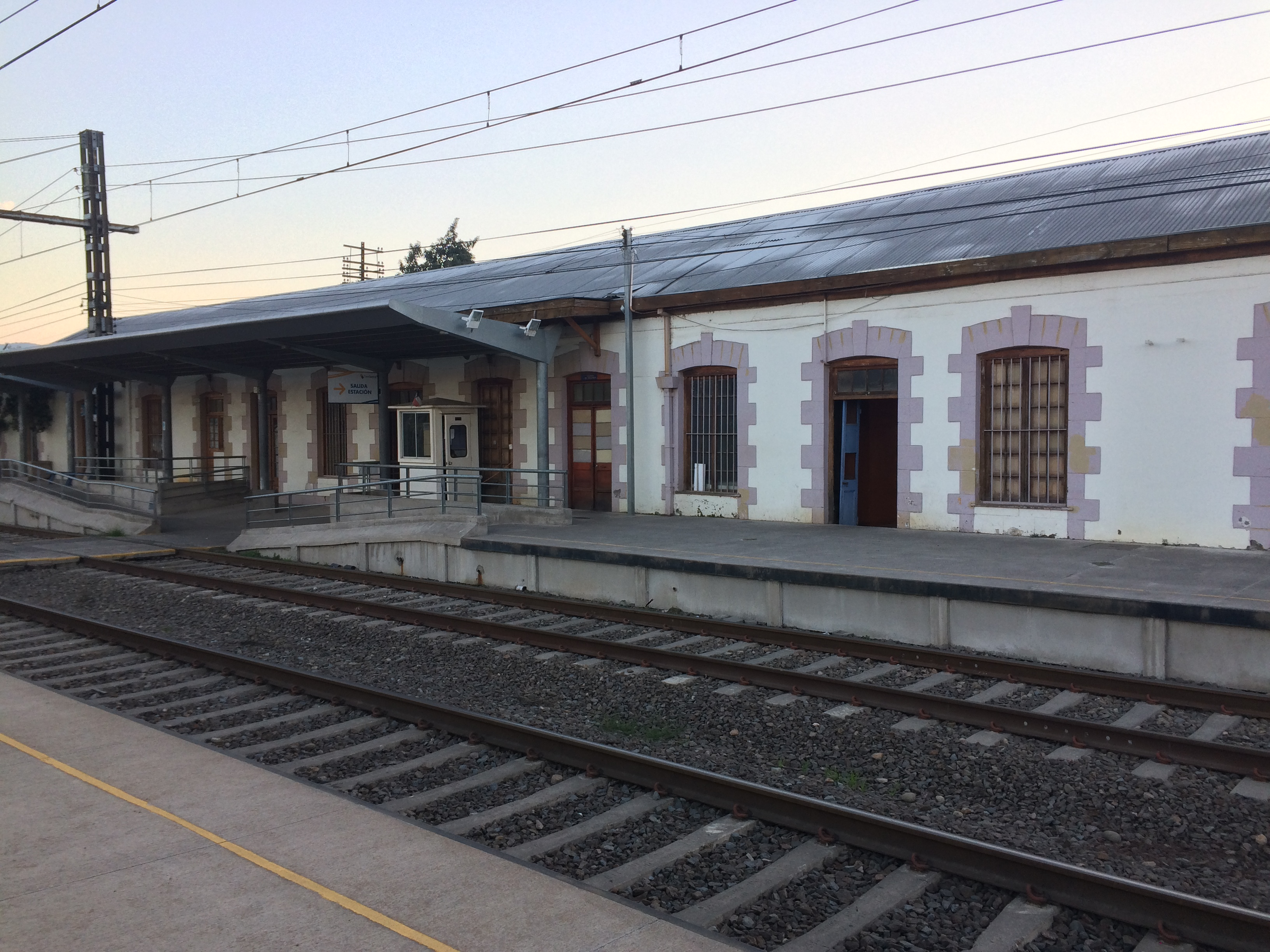

General information
- Location: Avenida Quechereguas 1078, San Fernando, Chile
- Coordinates: 34°35′24.742″S 70°58′58.253″W
- Owner: Empresa de los Ferrocarriles del Estado
- Lines: Red Sur EFE, Ramal Pichilemu
- Tracks: 3

Services
Preceding station	Empresa de los Ferrocarriles del Estado	Following station
Rancagua towards Santiago	TerraSur	Curicó towards Chillán
Rengo towards Santiago	Santiago-San Fernando	Terminus
Location

Estación San Fernando is a railway station of the Empresa de los Ferrocarriles del Estado, located in San Fernando, Chile. It became part of the Empresa de los Ferrocarriles del Estado on November 3, 1862. It is the main railway station in the Colchagua Province. It is located on Quechereguas avenue.

Estación San Fernando is part of the Red Sur EFE, the TerraSur inter-city service has a stop here. Metrotrén commuter service terminate at this station.

The Ramal Pichilemu diverge from here, originally to the city of Pichilemu (railway station) but the line was closed on 1987, operating today as far as Estación Peralillo.

The steam locomotive hauled, Tren del Vino (Wine Train), is a turistic train that operates every Saturday between Estación San Fernando and Estación Paniahue (in Santa Cruz).

The nearby San Fernando Bus Terminal is within walking distance from the Station.

== Lines and trains ==
The following lines and trains pass through or terminate at Estación San Fernando:

- Red Sur EFE
  - TerraSur inter-city service (Alameda - Estación Chillán)
  - Alameda-Temuco train inter-city service (Alameda - Estación Temuco)
- Ramal Pichilemu
  - Tren del Vino turistic service (Estación San Fernando - Estación Paniahue)

== Adjacent stations ==
←	Service	→
Rancagua	Red Sur EFE	Curicó
Estación Centinela	Ramal Pichilemu	Terminus
