= Linares railway station =

Railway station in Linares, Chile

Estación Linares
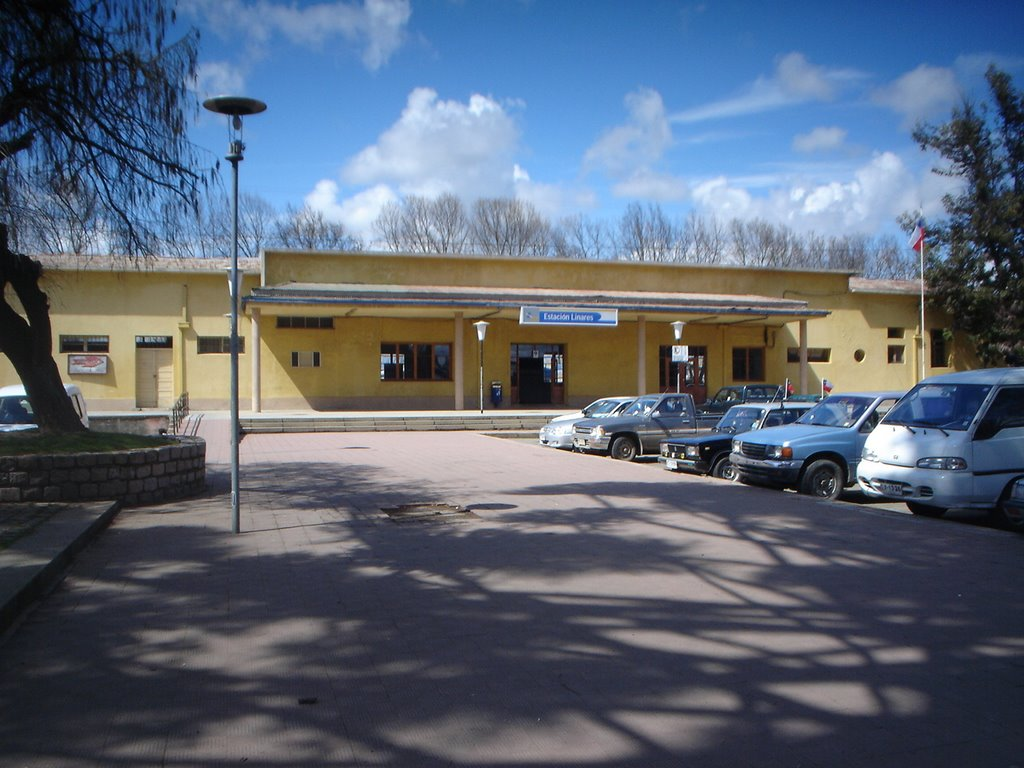
- Linares Railway station, 2019.

General information
- Location: Brasil s/n, Linares, Chile
- Coordinates: 35°50′51.207″S 71°35′28.331″W
- Owner: Empresa de los Ferrocarriles del Estado
- Line: Red Sur EFE
- Tracks: 2

History
- Opened: 1874

Services
Preceding station	Empresa de los Ferrocarriles del Estado	Following station
San Javier towards Santiago	TerraSur	Parral towards Chillán
San Javier towards Curicó	Curicó-Linares	Terminus
Former services
Preceding station	Empresa de los Ferrocarriles del Estado	Following station
San Javier towards Santiago	Expreso Maule 2012-2015	Terminus
Location

Estación Linares is a railway station of the Empresa de los Ferrocarriles del Estado, located in Linares, Chile. It is the main railway station in the Linares Province, and is located on Brasil Avenue.

Estación Linares is part of the Red Sur EFE, the TerraSur inter-city service has a stop here, and since 2012 the Expreso Maule has its final stop here.

The Ramal Colbún diverged from here, to the commune of Colbún, but the line was completely closed.

The nearby Linares Bus Terminal is within walking distance from the Station.

== Lines and trains ==
The following lines and trains pass through or terminate at Estación Linares:

- Red Sur EFE
  - TerraSur inter-city service (Alameda - Chillán)
  - Expreso Maule inter-city service (Alameda - Linares)

== Adjacent stations ==
←	Service	→
Estación San Javier	Red Sur EFE	Estación Parral
