= Curicó railway station =

Railway station in Curicó, Chile

Estación Curicó
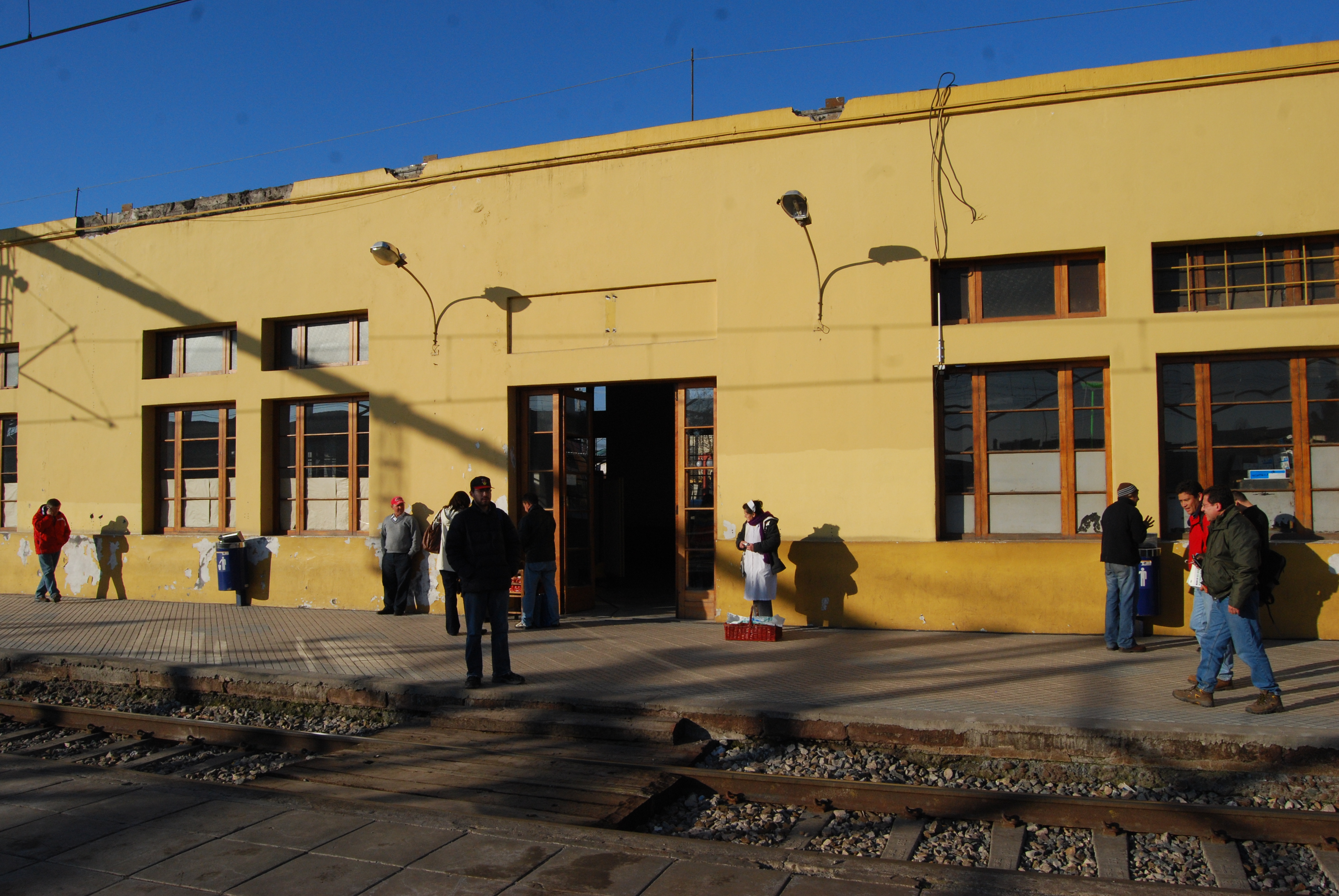

General information
- Location: Maipú 697, Curicó, Chile
- Coordinates: 34°59′0.307″S 71°14′47.936″W
- Owner: Empresa de los Ferrocarriles del Estado
- Line: Red Sur EFE
- Tracks: 2

History
- Opened: 1868

Services
Preceding station	Empresa de los Ferrocarriles del Estado	Following station
San Fernando towards Santiago	TerraSur	Molina towards Chillán
Terminus	Curicó-Linares	Molina towards Linares
Santiago Terminus	Alameda-Temuco Daytime	Talca towards Temuco
Location

Estación Curicó is a railway station of the Empresa de los Ferrocarriles del Estado, located in Curicó, Chile . It is the main railway station in the Curicó Province. It is located on Maipú street.

Estación Curicó is part of the Red Sur EFE, the TerraSur inter-city service has a stop here.

The Ramal Licantén diverged from here, to the city of Licantén but the line was completely closed on 1977.

The nearby Curicó Bus Terminal is within walking distance from the Station.

== Lines and trains ==
The following lines and trains pass through or terminate at Estación Curicó:

- Red Sur EFE
  - TerraSur inter-city service (Alameda - Chillán)
  - Expreso Maule inter-city service (Alameda - Linares)

== See also ==
- La Calera railway station
