= Şefik Abalı =

Turkish footballer (born 2002)

Personal information
- Date of birth: 7 June 2002 (age 24)
- Place of birth: Innsbruck, Austria
- Height: 1.92 m (6 ft 4 in)
- Position: Centre-back

Youth career
- 2010–2012: SV Telfs
- 2012–2016: Wacker Innsbruck
- 2016–2019: AKA Tirol

Senior career*
Years	Team	Apps	(Gls)
2019–2021	Wacker Innsbruck II	5	(0)
2019–2021	Wacker Innsbruck	11	(0)
2021–2022	Göztepe	0	(0)
2021–2022	→ SKU Amstetten (loan)	3	(0)
2022–2023	Dordrecht	4	(0)
2023	İskenderunspor	1	(0)

International career^{‡}
2019	Austria U18	3	(0)
2019	Turkey U19	2	(0)
- * Club domestic league appearances and goals as of 27 August 2023 ‡ National team caps and goals as of 22:23, 18 March 2021 (UTC)

Şefik Abalı (born 7 June 2002) is a professional footballer who plays as a centre-back. Born in Austria, he represents Turkey internationally.

== Career ==
Abalı made his professional debut with Wacker Innsbruck II in a 1–1 Austrian 2. Liga tie with FC Liefering on 29 May 2019.

On 1 July 2021, he signed a four-year contract with Göztepe in Turkey. Seven days later, on 8 July 2021, he joined SKU Amstetten on loan, back in Austria.

Abalı signed a two-and-a-half-year contract with Eerste Divisie club Dordrecht on 31 January 2022. He made his debut for the club on 4 February, coming on as an injury-time substitute for Toine van Huizen in the 2–2 league draw against Almere City.

On 16 January 2023, Abalı moved to TFF Second League club İskenderunspor on a 2.5-year contract. The contract was mutually terminated on 29 August 2023.

== International career ==
Born in Austria, Abalı is of Turkish descent. He is a youth international for both Austria and Turkey. He was called up to represent the Turkey U21s on 17 March 2021.
