= Ferrocarril del Pacífico S.A. =

Ferrocarril del Pacífico S.A. (FEPASA) is a freight transport company operating rail services in the south-central area of Chile and trucking in the North.

== History ==
Ferrocarril del Pacífico S.A. was set up on 15 September 1993 when it was decided to separate the freight and passenger services the State railway company. In 1994, 51% of the ownership was sold by tender to the private sector. The Consorcio Transportes del Pacífico took that majority share in January 1995.

A public share offering in 2003 brought FEPASA under the ownership of Puerto Ventanas S.A. a subsidiary of Sigdo Koppers S.A.

In 2005, EFE extended the contract for the use of the tracks to 2024.

In August 2010, FEPASA announced that it would enter the trucking business, as a complement to its current offer.

== Activity ==
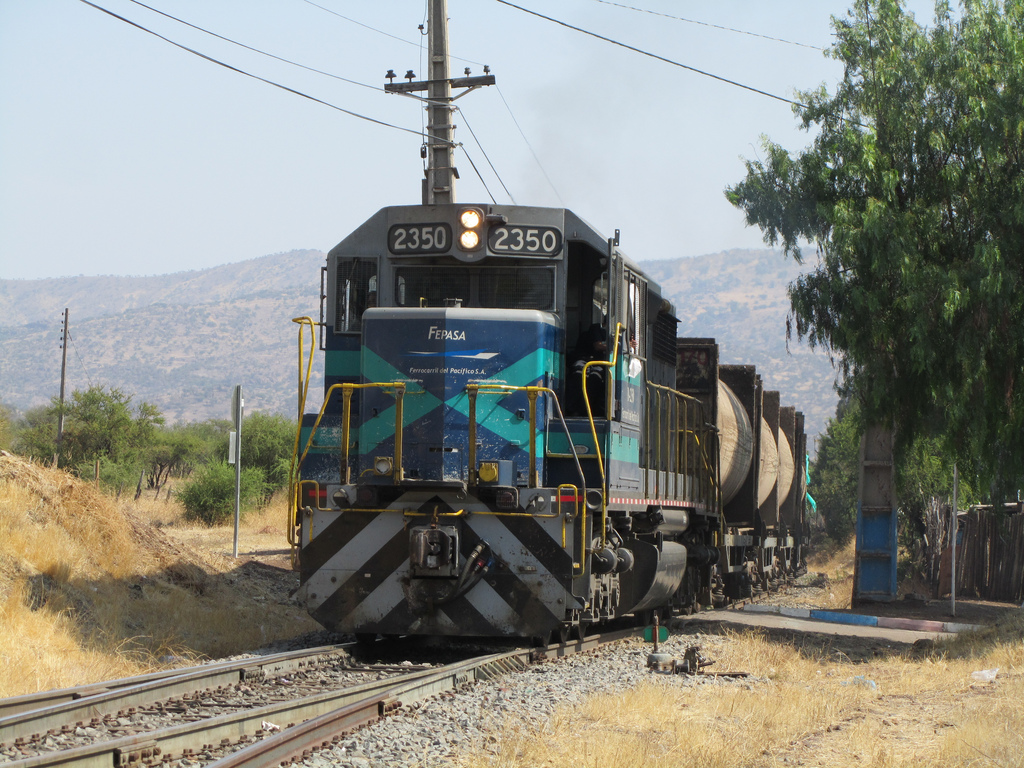
Fepasa's SD39-2M locomotive no. D-2350, transporting household waste (KDM)

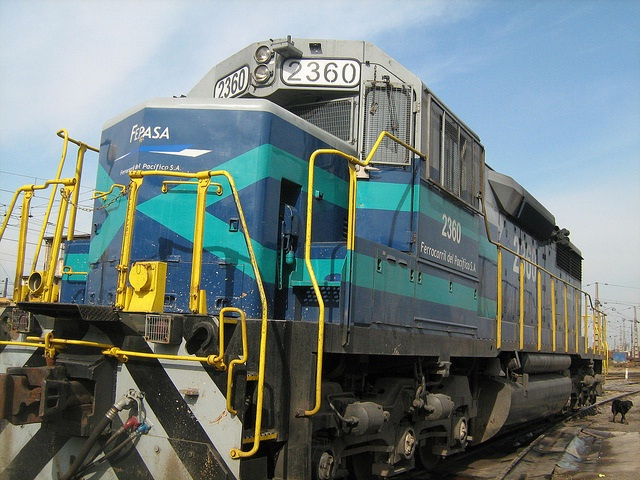
Locomotive type SD39-2M no. D-2360.

The company connects the centre and south of the country, covering seven regions of the country, using 1,722 kilometres of railway lines from La Calera to Puerto Montt. Several key ports are served including Puerto Ventanas, Valparaíso, San Antonio, Lirquén, Penco, Talcahuano, San Vicente and Coronel.

FEPASA handles over half of Santiago's municipal waste as well as cellulose, agricultural products, container, steel, pulpwood and logs, cement, wood chips, bulk minerals, chemicals, fuels, sawn wood, OSB and frozen salmon. As of 2018, FEPASA's fleet included 68 locomotives and more than 1887 wagons.
