= Ramal Talca-Constitución =

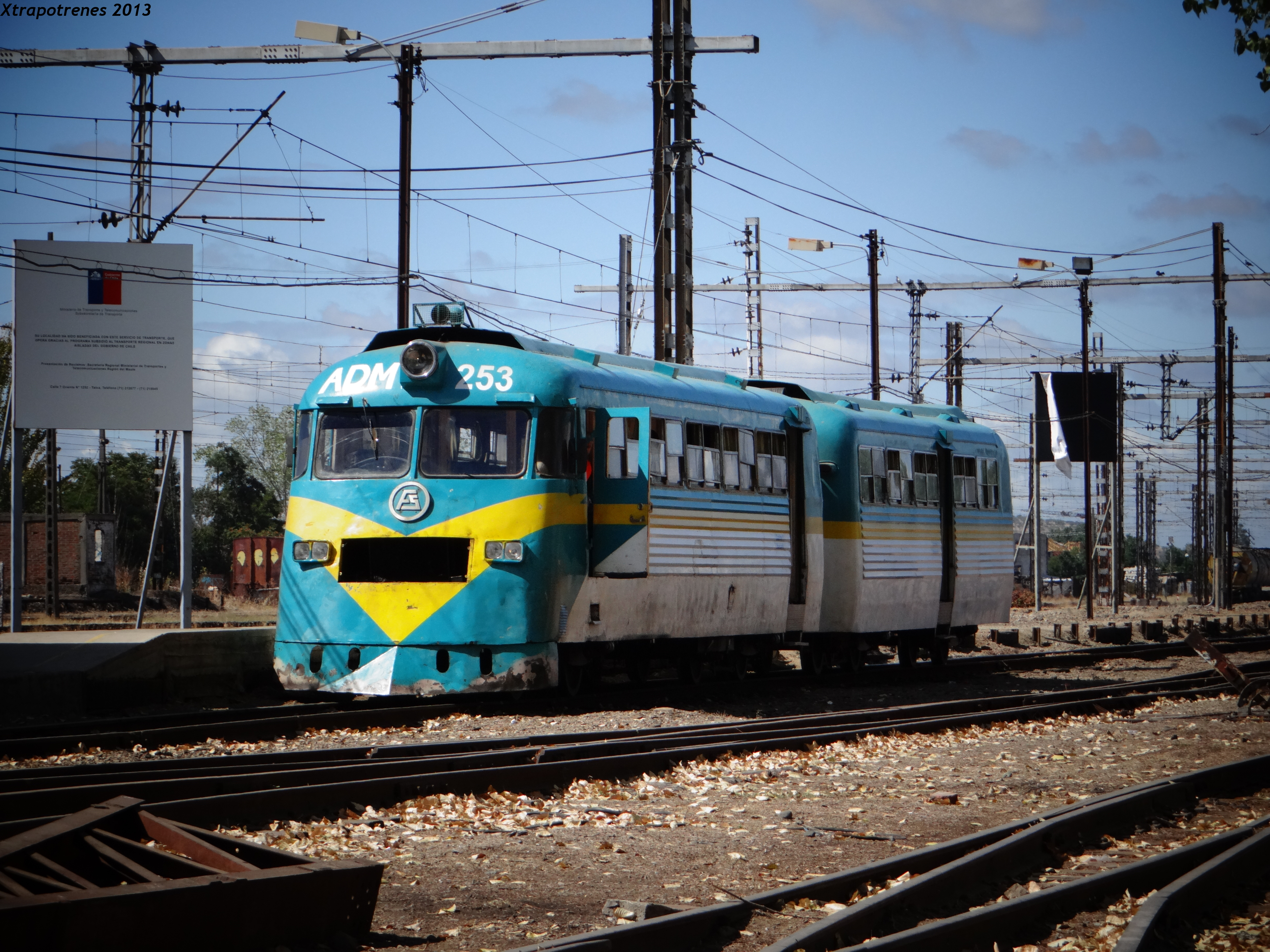
Train on the Talca-Constitución branch line

The Ramal Talca-Constitución, also known as the Ramal de Maule is the last remaining narrow-gauge ramal (branch line) in Chile. Its 88-kilometre (55 mi) route follows the north bank of the Maule River and crosses the communes of Talca, Maule, Pencahue and Constitución, with Constitución the last station on the line. The route features views of the Andean foothills and the Pacific Ocean. The line can support a speed of 50 miles per hour (80 km/h). The railway is facing closure due to inactivity and an increased preference for private transport.

Chile's last passenger metre gauge railway, the ramal runs through an area not served by other ground transportation. The Banco de Arena Railway Bridge over the Maule River, designed by architect Gustave Eiffel, was built from 1908 and 1915 by Schneider and Company. On May 25, 2007 the line was declared a national monument, a valued asset to the country which cannot be destroyed. It is included on the World Monuments Fund's 2018 list of monuments at risk, following damage from forest fires.

== History ==
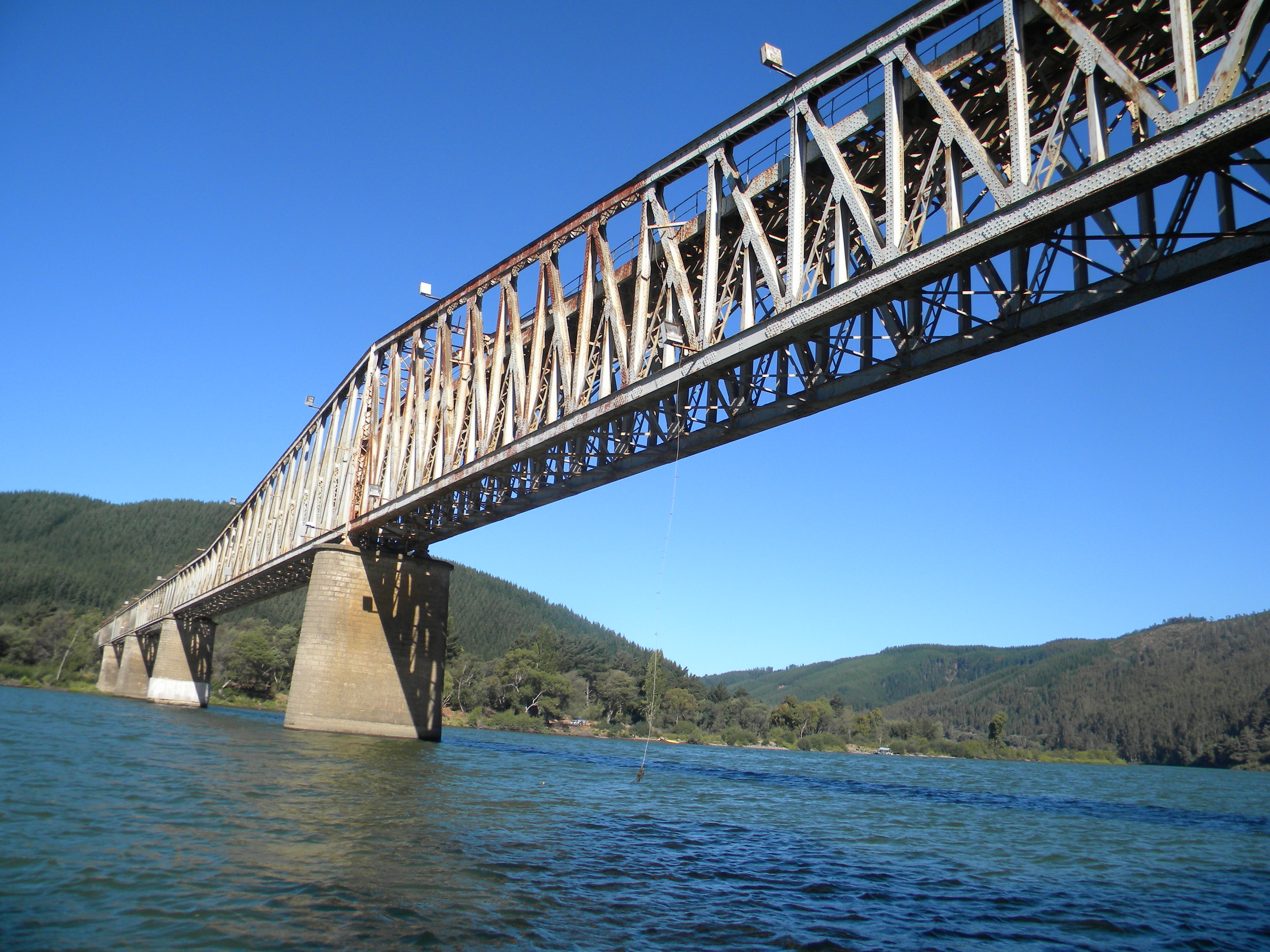
The Banco Arena Bridge, designed by Gustave Eiffel

Rail transport came to the Maule Region when the North and South American Company began construction of the line in 1889. The line opened on August 13, 1892, and the first steam train ran from Talca to Curtiduría (another commune in Chile). The second segment of the line, from Curtiduria to Pichamán (another commune) was completed on November 1, 1894. In 1902 construction progressed towards the northern bank of the Maule River, where the first Constitución station was built on a sandbank. The station was difficult to reach; passengers crossed the river from the city, and a convoy brought them to the Constitución station. It was used for 13 years, until 1915 (when the present Constitución station opened).

Construction of the line took almost 25 years to complete, under seven presidencies:

1. Jose Manuel Balmaceda (1886-1891)
2. Jorge Montt Alvarez (1891-1896)
3. Federico Errazuriz Echaurren (1896-1901)
4. Germán Riesco (1901-1906)
5. Pedro Montt Montt (1906-1910)
6. Emiliano Figueroa (September–December 1910)
7. Ramon Barros Luco (1910-1915)
8. Juan Luis Sanfuentes (opened on December 19, 1915)

The line had an uptick in tourism boom after the episode The Last Ramal of the documentary series El Mirador 2000, which was aired by several channels around the world. Televisión Nacional de Chile broadcast a December 2005 report on the railway, Fruit of the Country, followed by a Canal 13 episode of Places that Speak in 2015 to mark the centennial since the railway became fully operational.

In 2025, 3 new Brazilian built two-car DMUs finally arrived to the railway - the first new orders to the line after more than half a century, increasing its capacity. The stations are slated for renovations and a possible double tracking, coupled with efforts to preserving much of the storied history of the line and its legendary 70s railbuses, which are part of the heritage of the Maule Region since they were received in the decade.

=== Old route ===
The narrow gauge line originally followed the coast in Constitución to the now-abandoned Sea Baths, a popular Victorian-era tourist resort. Another stop was later added before the Celulosa Arauco y Constitucion (Celco) pulp-mill station. To reach the Celco plant, the diesel railbuses ran through the streets of Constitución. This created many problems and was banned by the municipality during the early 1970s, although the trains continued to run into the 1990s.

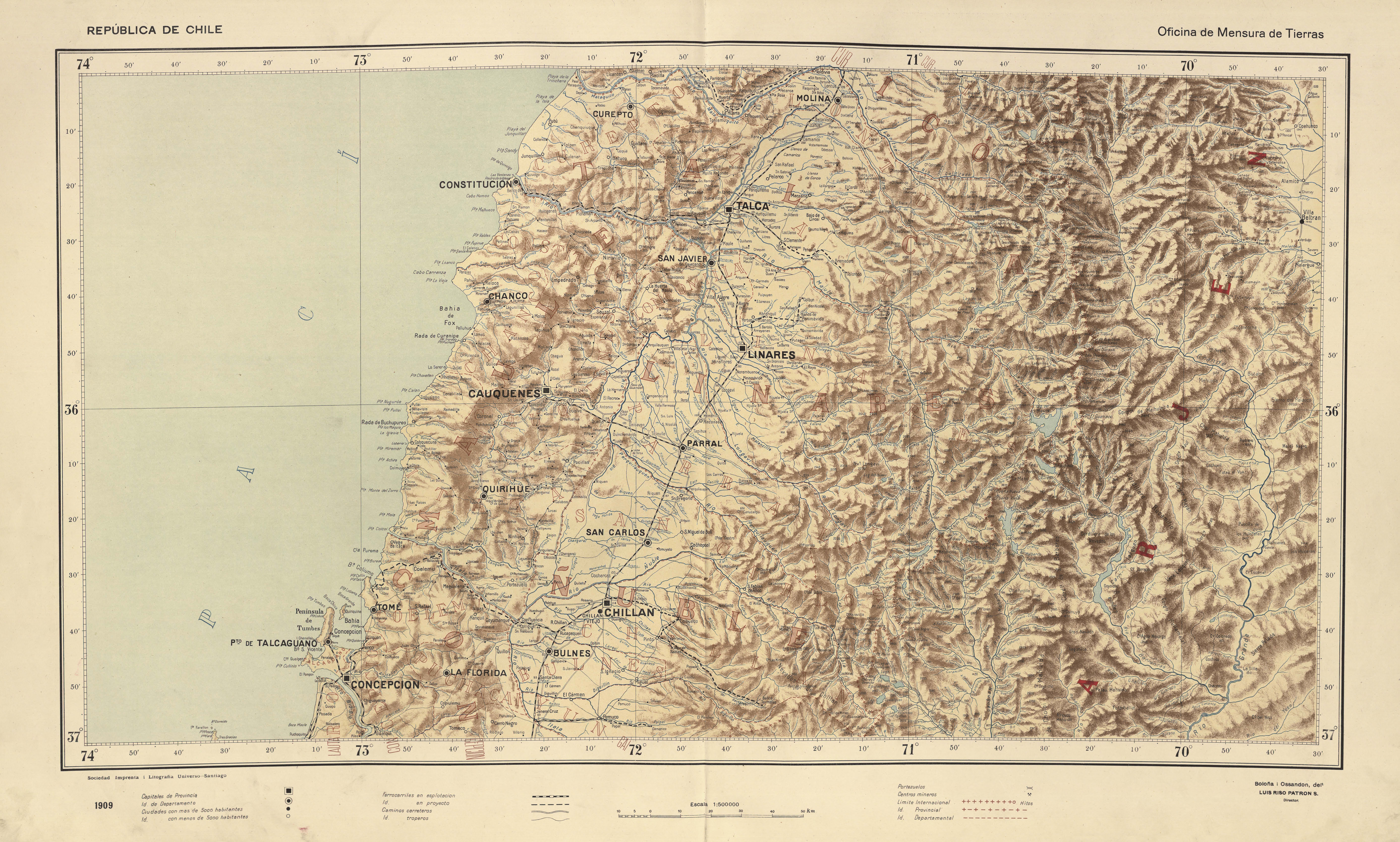

== Specifications ==
- Name - Ramal Talca-Constitución or Ramal de Maule
- Home station - Talca
- Terminus - Constitución
- Location - Talca Province, Maule Region
- Distance - 88 km
- Opening date - August 13, 1892; 133 years ago
- Status - Operating
- Type - Passenger
- Operator - Empresa de los Ferrocarriles del Estado
- Gauge - Narrow (1000 mm)
- Fuel - Diesel (formerly steam)
- Cars - German Ferrobús-Buscarril railcar models, such as the ADM 253, 255 and 256, complemented by Marcopolo Rail airconditioned two-car diesel railbuses
- Maximum speed - 60 km/h
- Weight - 30.3 tons
- Length - 25.5 metres (84 ft)

== Dependent communities ==
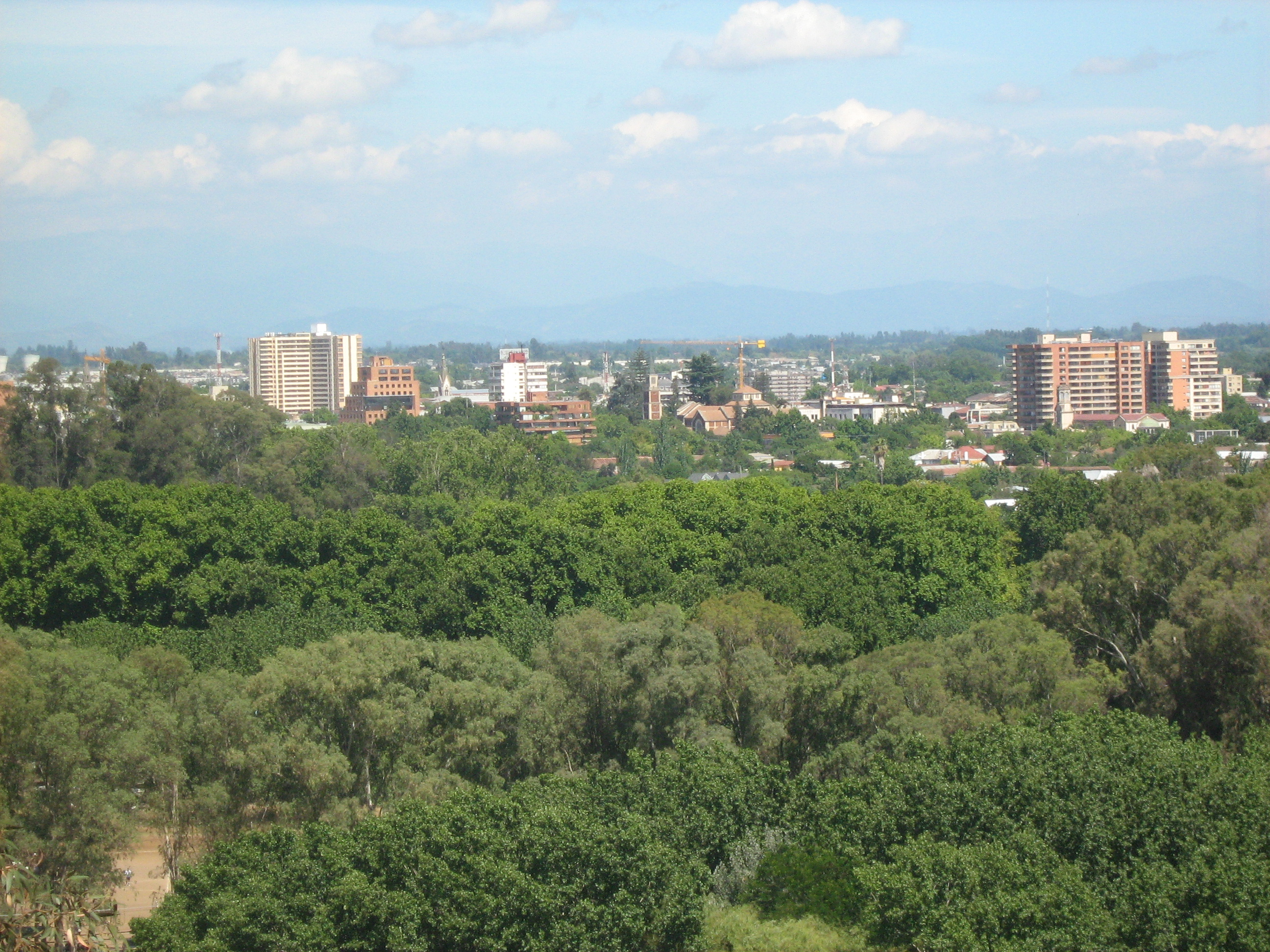
Talca skyline

Nearly all the villages connected by the Ramal Talca-Constitución are not connected to major cities and communes by other transport methods; they are an average of 35 kilometres (22 mi) from the road linking the cities of Talca and Curepto). The Ministry of Transport and Telecommunications requested tenders for a transportation system which could connect these remote locations, and Empresa de los Ferrocarriles del Estado won the tender. The company maintains a regular service for the thousands of local inhabitants; locals have priority on the line over tourists or other users.

== Route ==
Distances below (in kilometers) are approximate.

Talca
The home station, where trains begin daily at 7:30 and 16:45 Chilean time
Colín
12 km from Talca, its name was derived from a bird (colines) which was once abundant.
Rauquén
Former station before the bridge crossing the Claro River
Corinto
Formerly known as Pocoa, it is 27 km from Talca and named after a Greek businessman.
El Morro
Named for Morro de Arica, in a similar area, it is near the mouth of the Light and Loncomilla Rivers.
Curtiduría
The first train on the line ran from this station and Talca.
Los Llocos
The station, 36 km from Talca, is in a village of the same name.
Tricahue
38 km from Talca, in a former monastery
El Peumo
41 km from Talca.
González Bastías
The midpoint of the line (44 km from Talca and Constitution), the station was previously known as Infiernillo.
Toconey
48 km from Talca and previously known as San Antonio and Tanhuao, it is one of the ramal's busiest stations.
Pichamán Oriente
50.5 km from Talca
Pichamán ("little condor")
52 km from Talca
Los Romeros
One of the busiest stations, 55 km from Talca
Los Maquis
57.5 km from Talca
Forel
62 km from Talca, it owes its current name to Swiss biologist François-Alphonse Forel (who lived there for several years).
Huinganes
68 km from Talca, it is one of the line's best-preserved stations and was named after a shrub (huingan) which is abundant in the area.
Los Digüeñes
The fifth-from-last station
Maquehua
74 km from Talca
Astillero
78 km from Talca
Banco de Arena
83 km from Talca, it was the terminus of the line until 1912.
Constitución
Terminus of the line, trains depart at the same time as from Talca.

=== González Bastías station ===
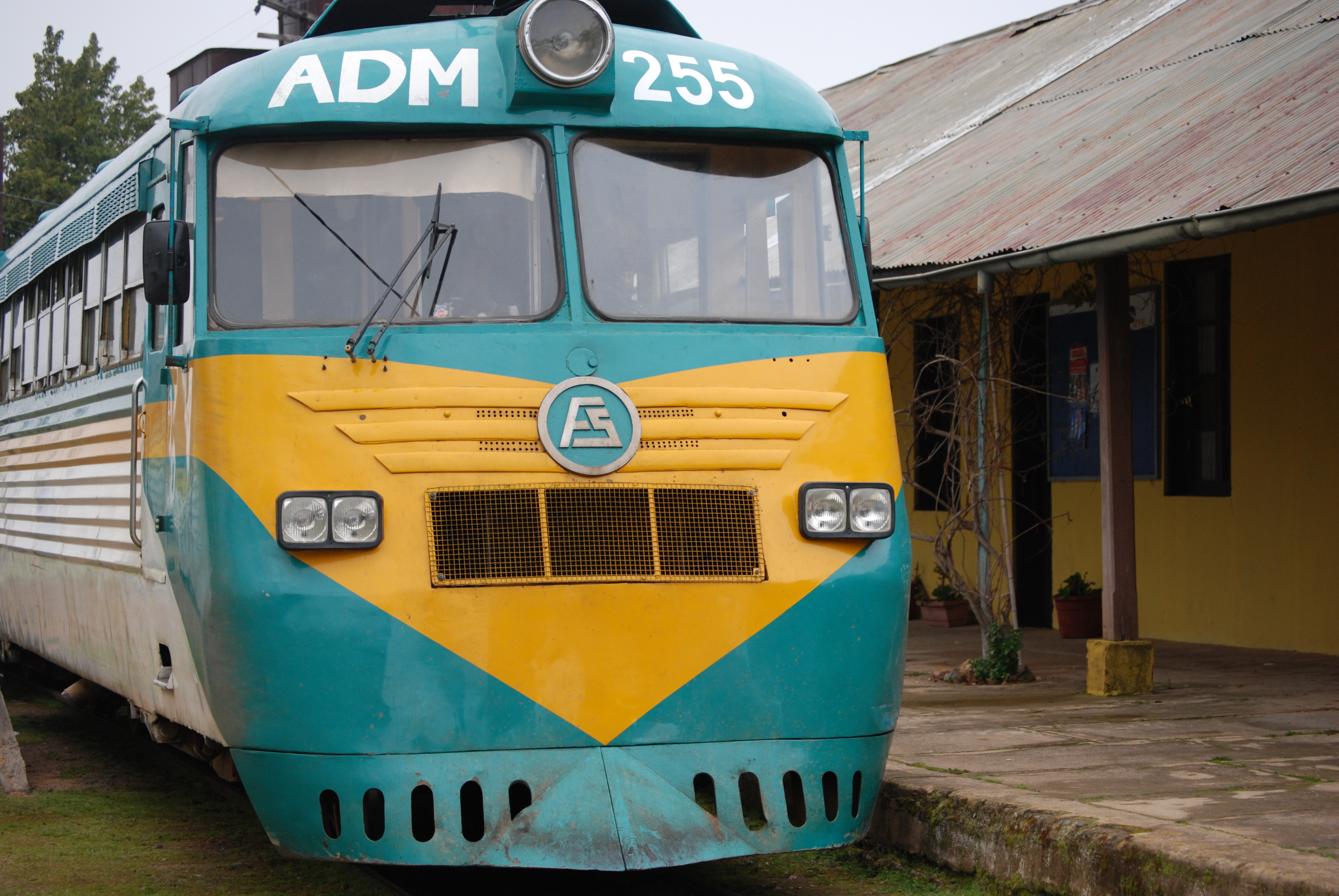
González Bastias station

González Bastías is a small town which, at 44 km, is the line's halfway point. It is an obligatory stop for trains in both directions, since there is only one track and they must pass each other. During the stop-over, people often buy rescoldo: a hearty bread with pork sausage and hard-boiled eggs. The station is also a storehouse for abandoned railcars.

González Bastías was formerly known as Infiernillo (little hell) for its summer heat and winter isolation. The town was later renamed in honor of a local poet, and the station is also known as Estación Poeta.

== 2010 earthquake ==
Tsunami flooding in Constitucion, which affected the station

The line was severely damaged by the 2010 8.8-magnitude earthquake. The quake's ensuing tsunami destroyed the Constitución station. National media reported that ghost towns sprang up whilst the line was out of service because the towns served by the line are dependent on it. In a normal year, 90,000 people use the line to travel to local towns for work, leisure or commerce. After nine months out of service it was reopened by president Sebastián Piñera, who fulfilled an election promise. Despite the earthquake and tsunami damage, the ramal was repaired relatively quickly.
