= 2-oxoglutarate/L-arginine monooxygenase/decarboxylase (succinate-forming) =

Class of enzymes

Identifiers
- EC no.: 1.14.11.34

Databases
- IntEnz: IntEnz view
- BRENDA: BRENDA entry
- ExPASy: NiceZyme view
- KEGG: KEGG entry
- MetaCyc: metabolic pathway
- PRIAM: profile
- PDB structures: RCSB PDB PDBe PDBsum
Search
- PMC: articles
- PubMed: articles
- NCBI: proteins

2-oxoglutarate/L-arginine monooxygenase/decarboxylase (succinate-forming) (EC 1.14.11.34, ethylene-forming enzyme, EFE) is an enzyme with systematic name L-arginine,2-oxoglutarate:oxygen oxidoreductase (succinate-forming). This enzyme catalyses the following chemical reaction

2-oxoglutarate + L-arginine + O_{2} $\rightleftharpoons$ succinate + CO_{2} + guanidine + (S)-1-pyrroline-5-carboxylate + H_{2}O (overall reaction)
(1a) 2-oxoglutarate + L-arginine + O_{2} $\rightleftharpoons$ succinate + CO_{2} + L-hydroxyarginine
(1b) L-hydroxyarginine $\rightleftharpoons$ guanidine + (S)-1-pyrroline-5-carboxylate + H_{2}O

2-oxoglutarate/L-arginine monooxygenase/decarboxylase catalyses two cycles of the ethylene-forming reaction.
