= Şefik Kamil Efes =

Turkish banker and businessman (1899-1988)

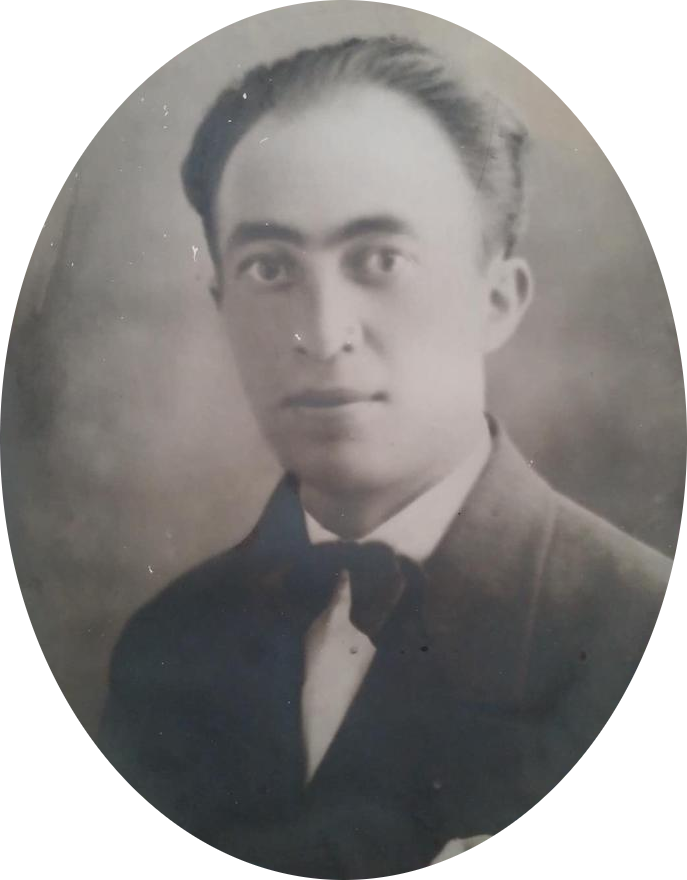
- Born: Şefik Kamil; 1899; Ereğli, Zonguldak
- Died: 1988 (aged 88–89); Zonguldak
- Citizenship: Republic of Turkey
- Organization: Efesbank
- Known for: Founder of local bank called Efesbank
- Spouse: Hilmiye Efes

Şefik Kamil Efes (1899, Ereğli, Zonguldak – 1988, Ereğli, Zonguldak), Turkish banker and businessperson. He is the founder of Efesbank, the first domestic and private bank of the city of Zonguldak in Turki.

== Life and career ==
He was born in Eregli in 1899. It is said that he is the descendant of a janissary lord who escaped from Istanbul during the reign of Mahmud II and settled in the Ortaca village of Ereğli. His grandfather Hüseyin Kamil Efendi and his father Tevfik Efes were judges.

After completing his high school education, Şefik Kamil started his business life as a manager in his uncle's mines in Kandilli. After working as a baker for a while, he worked in the sales of mine poles, the supply of sleepers for the railways under construction and construction. Together with his wife, Hilmiye Hanım, he established a company to undertake all kinds of commitments of mine poles, forest commitments, government and institutions, and to buy and sell all kinds of commercial commodities. When he had problems with getting a letter of guarantee, he decided to establish a bank in Zonguldak, like many private-local banks established in Anatolia at that time. In 1932, he established a loan bank called "Help Bank". Due to his interest in archeology, he chose the name of the ancient city of Ephesus as his surname when the Surname Law was enacted.

In 1937, the name of the bank was changed to Efesbank. He liquidated Efes Bank in 1972 and quit trading. He died in Ereğli, Zonguldak in 1988 due to health problems he experienced.

== Bibliography ==
- Son asir Türk tarihinin önemli olaylari ile birlikde yeni mülkiye târihi ve mülkiyeliler, Siyasal Bilgiler Fakültesi, 1969, Michigan Üniversitesi.
- Yeni Mülkiye târihi ve mülkiyeliler (Mülkiye şeref kitabı): cild. Mülkiye Mektebi, Siyasal Bilgiler Okulu meʼzunları, 1924–1949, Ankara Üniversitesi. Siyasal Bilgiler Fakültesi, S.B.F., 1969.
- Artık herkes milyoner: Hürriyet sayfalarından ekonominin 50 yılı, Ercan Kumcu, Şevket Pamuk, Doğan Kitap, 2001, Michigan Üniversitesi.
- Atatürk Döneminde Türkiye Ekonomisi Semineri. İstanbul: Yapı ve Kredi Bankası, 1982.
- Zonguldak 1973 il yıllığı, Sulhi Garan Matbaası, 1973.
- İşlevi-gelişimi-özellikleri ve sorunlarıyla Türkiye'de bankacılık, Tuncay Artun, Tekin Yayınevi, 1980.
- 100 soruda Türkiye'de bankacılık, Öztin Akgüç, Gerçek Yayınevi, 1987.
