= Metrotrén =

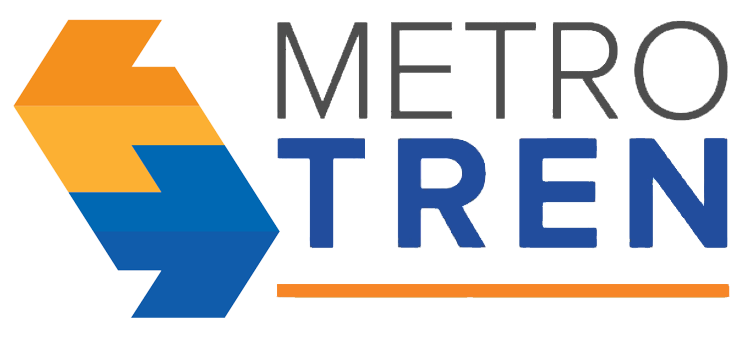

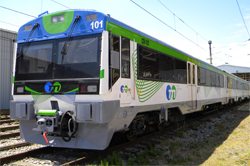
- UT-440 EMU headed for Alameda

Overview
- Locale: Santiago, O'Higgins
- Termini: Estación Alameda; Estación San Fernando
- Stations: 18

Service
- Type: Heavy rail
- Operator(s): EFE Central S.A.
- Rolling stock: 5 CAF UT-440; 1 CAF UT-440MC; 16 Alstom X'Trapolis Modular
- Daily ridership: 74,000
- Ridership: 22.3 million (2019)

History
- Opened: 1990

Technical
- Line length: 133.8 km (83.14 mi)
- Track gauge: 1,676 mm (5 ft 6 in)
- Electrification: 3 kV DC overhead catenary
- Operating speed: 100–150 km/h (62–93 mph)

The Metrotrén (Spanish compound for metro, 'subway' + tren, 'train') was a Chilean commuter rail and regional rail service operated by the state-owned rail company EFE. The system started as a 134-kilometre (83 mi) line between Santiago and San Fernando, unifying between them the city of Rancagua and 23 other towns in the Metropolitan and O'Higgins regions. This line was first connected with the Santiago Metro at Alameda station, which gave the name to the service.

In 2017, after 5 years of renovation, the service was split into two, a fully renovated, 20-kilometre (12 mi) commuter service between Santiago and Nos, a neighborhood in San Bernardo, in the south of the city, and an 82-kilometre (51 mi) regional rail between Santiago and Rancagua. This caused the suppression of all Metrotren services to San Fernando, a second connection with the Santiago Metro at Lo Valledor station, and the integration of the Santiago-Nos service to the Metropolitan Movility Network, introducing the railway services into Santiago's integrated public transport fares.

The integration was responsible for a large increase in annual ridership, and growing demand from the public for more rail services. Since 2019, the government has announced the construction of two brand new commuter lines from Santiago, with services to Melipilla, in the south-west, and the recovery and restoration of the line to Batuco, in the north. Both of them will be partially integrated to the city's public transport fare.

In 2021, EFE decided to eliminate the brand Metrotren, and establish the services as separate brands, still fully operated by the company.

== History ==
=== Pre-Metrotren era (1965-1979) ===
The first precedents of a commuter rail service in Chile are from 1965, during the administration of Eduardo Frei Montalva, in which it was implemented a service called "Trenes populares" (People's trains), which circulated from Alameda towards Lo Espejo and San Bernardo in the south, and Mapocho in the north. The stations weren't established as such, and it had more resemblance to a bus stop. The services were eliminated in 1979 by the military dictatorship of Augusto Pinochet, because of low profitability and the economical and administrative reformulation process that the state was having during those years.

=== First era (1990-2017) ===
After the fall of the military dictatorship, and with the return of democratic rule in 1990, pollution in Santiago became a health priority issue for the new authorities. In May 24, regional authorities declared a 4-digit no-drive days. In order to avoid collapse in the public transport, the government decided to create an improvised commuter rail service to connect Santiago with Talagante in the west, and Rancagua in the south. The service was a success and it was decided to test the capabilities during the following week.

Given the success of the service between Santiago and Rancagua, it was formally established in October 25, suspending all services to Talagante because of low demand. One year later, on May 11, 1991, a service to Til Til and Batuco, both towns in the north of Santiago, was created using the old line between Santiago and Valparaíso, yet the service was also suspended because of low demand. The rolling stock consisted in three reconditioned AEL (Automotor Eléctrico Local, Local Electrical Motorcar) made by Kawasaki Heavy Industries and Hitachi, and exported by Nissho Iwai in 1973, in order to serve the lines between Santiago and Valparaíso, and between Santiago and Talca.

In 1997, the Chilean government reached an agreement with RENFE, in order to buy 16 UT-440 trains. The purchase was completed in 2001, with 4 of the units destined to the Valparaíso Metro, and the remaining 12 to the Metrotren line. On December 28, 2000, the service was extended from Rancagua to San Fernando, and on June 27, 2002, a new station was added near the Buin Zoo.

In 2006, given the crisis inside EFE after a corruption scandal that led the company to almost bankruptcy, it was decided to empower the most profitable services in order the national rail system. The Metrotren line received a complete renovation in communications, electrification, signaling and station infrastructure, as well as the rolling stock was painted orange in order to facilitate the use in other EFE services like Biotren. In 2009, the services were again changed in painting and seat configuration.

During that year, the first administration of Michelle Bachelet left planned an express service to Rancagua, in order to reduce travel time to 55 minutes. The project was taken by the first administration of Sebastián Piñera in their public transport master plan towards 2025, and it was decided to add another express service to Nos, integrating the commuter rail services with the public transport of Santiago, facilitating the transfer to and from buses and Metro system with the integrated fare that existed within the latter two since 2007.

=== Second era (2017-2021) ===
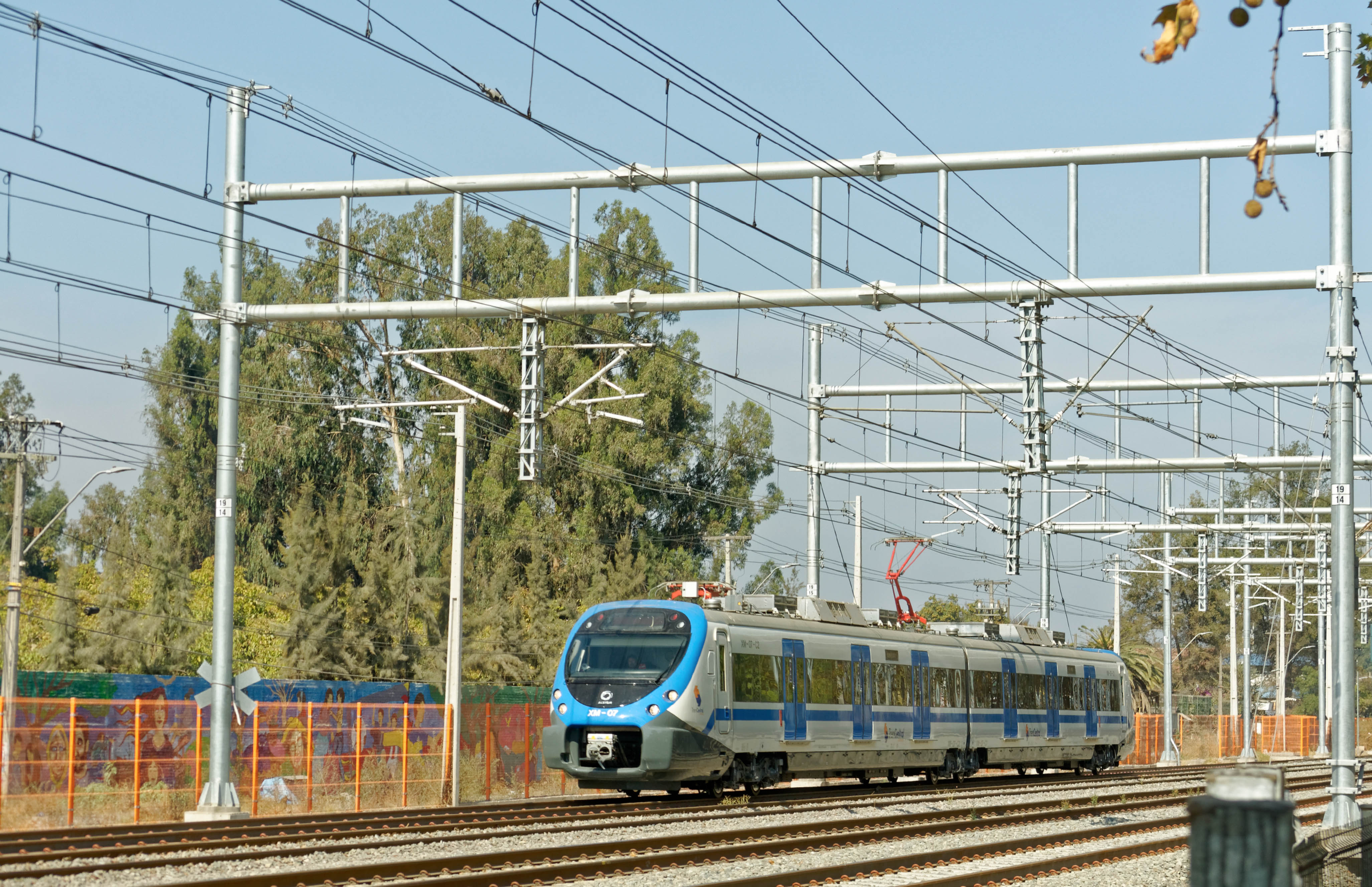
X'Trapolis Modular

In 2016, after 4 years of construction, the service between Santiago and Nos was completed. The project added two, brand new lines for exclusive use of the service, renovations in electrification, infrastructure, and rolling stock, with the tunneling of every level crossing and station mezzanines, and the purchase of new X'Trapolis Modular trains, based in the Civia train, to Alstom. The services reduced the time of travel to Nos to less than 40 minutes. In 2017, the service formally started and it was definitely integrated to the Santiago public transport system.

During this time, it was decided to scrap the plans for an express service to Rancagua because of the costs of the new rolling stock, and the service restarted in 2017 as it was before the renovations. Also, given the low profitability of services to San Fernando and the renovation work, the Metrotren stopped all frequencies to the town in 2013, letting the station only served by the Santiago-Chillan service with 2 frequencies every day. The local authorities of the towns between Rancagua and San Fernando, and the authorities of San Fernando itself had continuously demanded to the central government to restart services, specially after the effects of the COVID-19 pandemic, which represented a hard hit to the tourism sector of the zone. The government promised the restoration of rail services in the second half of 2021.

In 2021, all EFE services, with the sole exception of the Biotren, were rebranded to give generic and separated denomination to the services. This led to the end of the Metrotren brand after almost 31 years. The services are branded now as the Santiago-Rancagua line, and the Santiago-Nos line.

== Stations ==
- Estación Alameda, Estación Central
- Pedro Aguirre Cerda, Pedro Aguirre Cerda
- Estación San Bernardo, San Bernardo
- Maestranza, San Bernardo
- Nos, San Bernardo
- Buin Zoo, Buin
- Buin, Buin
- Linderos, Buin
- Paine, Paine
- Hospital, Paine
- San Francisco, Mostazal
- Graneros, Graneros
- Estación Rancagua, Rancagua
- Requínoa, Requínoa
- Rosario, Rengo
- Rengo Station, Rengo
- Pelequén, Malloa
- Estación San Fernando, San Fernando

== See also ==
- Biotren
- List of suburban and commuter rail systems
- La Calera railway station
