= Central Station (Santiago) =

Railway station in Santiago, Chile

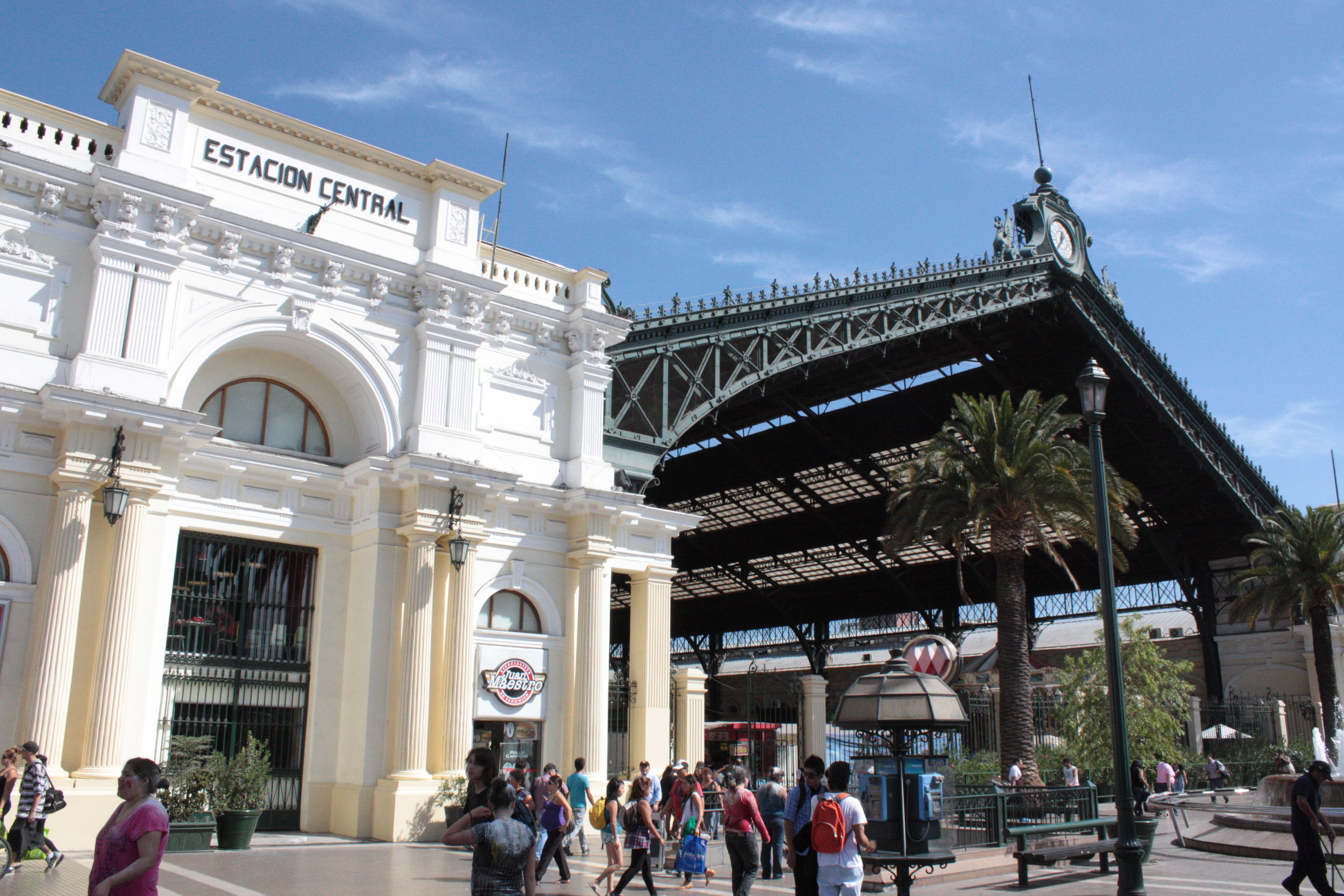
- The station photographed in 2012.

General information
- Location: Avenida Bernardo O'Higgins 3170, Estación Central, Santiago, Chile
- Coordinates: 33°27′07″S 70°40′44″W
- System: Terminal
- Owner: Empresa de los Ferrocarriles del Estado
- Lines: Red Sur EFE, Ramal Cartagena
- Tracks: 8

History
- Opened: 1885
- Rebuilt: 1897

Services
Preceding station	Empresa de los Ferrocarriles del Estado	Following station
Terminus	TerraSur	San Bernardo towards Chillán
Terminus	Santiago-San Fernando	San Bernardo towards San Fernando
Terminus	Santiago-Rancagua	Pedro Aguirre Cerda towards Rancagua
Terminus	Santiago-Nos	Pedro Aguirre Cerda towards Nos
Terminus	Alameda-Temuco	Curicó Daytime towards Temuco
Terminus	Alameda-Temuco	Rancagua Nighttime towards Temuco
Terminus	Santiago-Concepción	San Rosendo towards Concepción
Former services
Preceding station	Empresa de los Ferrocarriles del Estado	Following station
Terminus	Expreso Maule 2012-2015	Graneros towards Linares
Future services
Preceding station	Empresa de los Ferrocarriles del Estado	Following station
Estación Central 2 towards Melipilla	Melitrén	Terminus
Location

Central Station (Spanish: Estación Central), also known as Alameda station, is a major railway station in Santiago, Chile. It serves the south of the country and is the city's primary railway hub. After the closure of Mapocho, it became the only major railway station in Santiago. It is on the Avenida Libertador General Bernardo O'Higgins, facing Matucana avenue.

== Overview ==
The station opened in 1885, with the building designed by Gustave Eiffel in 1897 and its metallic structure built by the French firm Schneider of Le Creusot. In 1983, it was declared a National Monument by the Chilean government, protecting it by law from demolition or remodeling. It has long been a reference point for travellers and locals; becoming so well known that it gave the name to the municipality and commune where it is located, Estación Central.

In recent years, the station has undergone a revival as the government-owned railway Empresa de los Ferrocarriles del Estado has been modernized to restore the bygone appeal for train travel. These efforts have been met with moderate success.

On 24 May 2021, EFE officially renamed the station from "Alameda" to "Central Station".

The station is a key transportation hub, with the underground Santiago Metro Line 1 Estación Central metro station located at its central gates. Three intercity bus terminals are also within walking distance, and numerous local bus lines serve the station. A medium-sized shopping center is adjacent to the station, and the nearby San Borja Bus Terminal is also within walking distance, connected by an additional complex of shopping centers.

== Lines and trains ==
The following lines and trains terminate here:

- EFE Central
  - TerraSur inter-city service (Alameda - Chillán)
  - Tren Alameda - Nos commuter service (Alameda - Nos)
  - Tren Estación Central - Rancagua commuter/regional service (Alameda - Rancagua)
  - Tren Estación Central - San Fernando (Pilot of extension of Tren Estación Central - Rancagua)
- Touristic Trains
  - Tren del Recuerdo (Estación Central-San Antonio, Chile)
  - Tren Del Recuerdo (Estación Central - Limache)
  - Tren Sabores Del Valle
- Occasional Services
  - Tren nocturno Santiago-Concepción inter-city service (Alameda - Concepción)
  - TerraSur Temuco inter-city service (Alameda - Temuco)

== Nearby Landmarks ==
- University of Santiago
- San Borja Bus Terminal
- Estación Central metro station
- Mall Plaza Alameda (shopping center)
  - H&M and Ripley retail stores.
- Paseo Arauco Estación (shopping center)
  - París and Fashion's Park retail stores, Sodimac (warehouse store).
- Cinépolis, a 6 screens Movie theater.
- Planetarium "Universidad de Santiago".

== Adjacent stations ==
←	Service	→
Estación Pedro Aguirre Cerda	Red Sur EFE	Terminus
Estación Maipú	Ramal Cartagena (Cargo)	Terminus

== Gallery ==
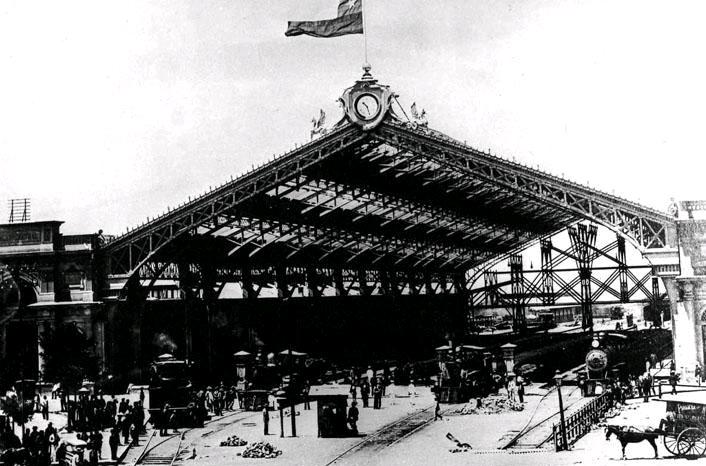
The station in 1897

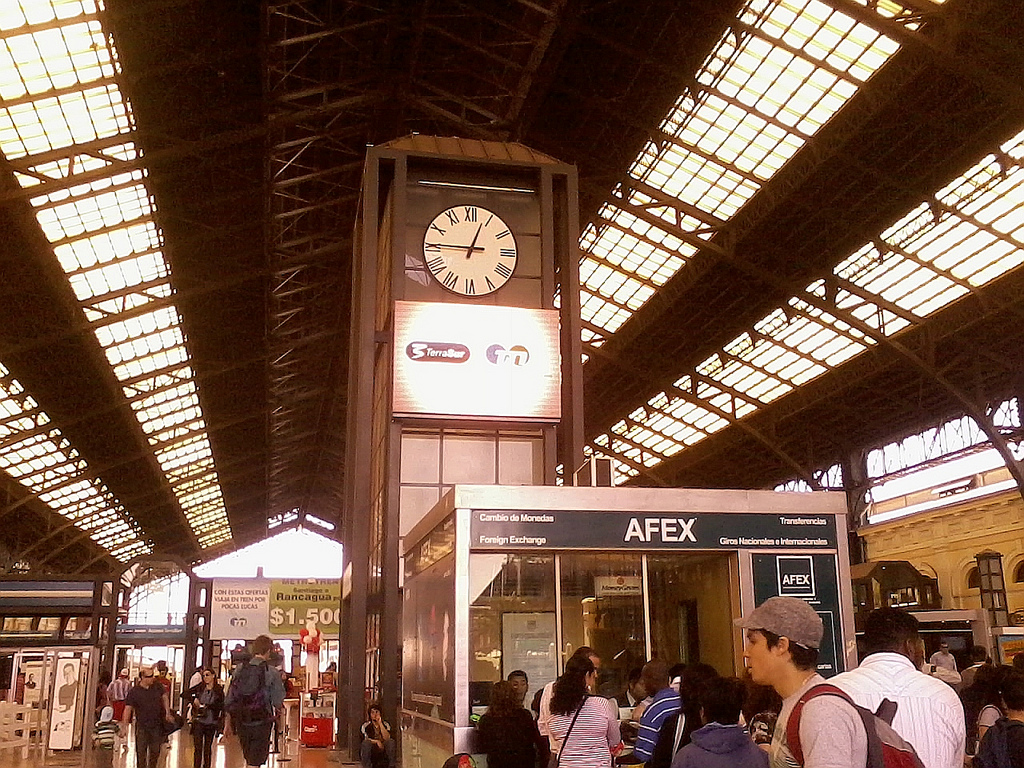
Main hall

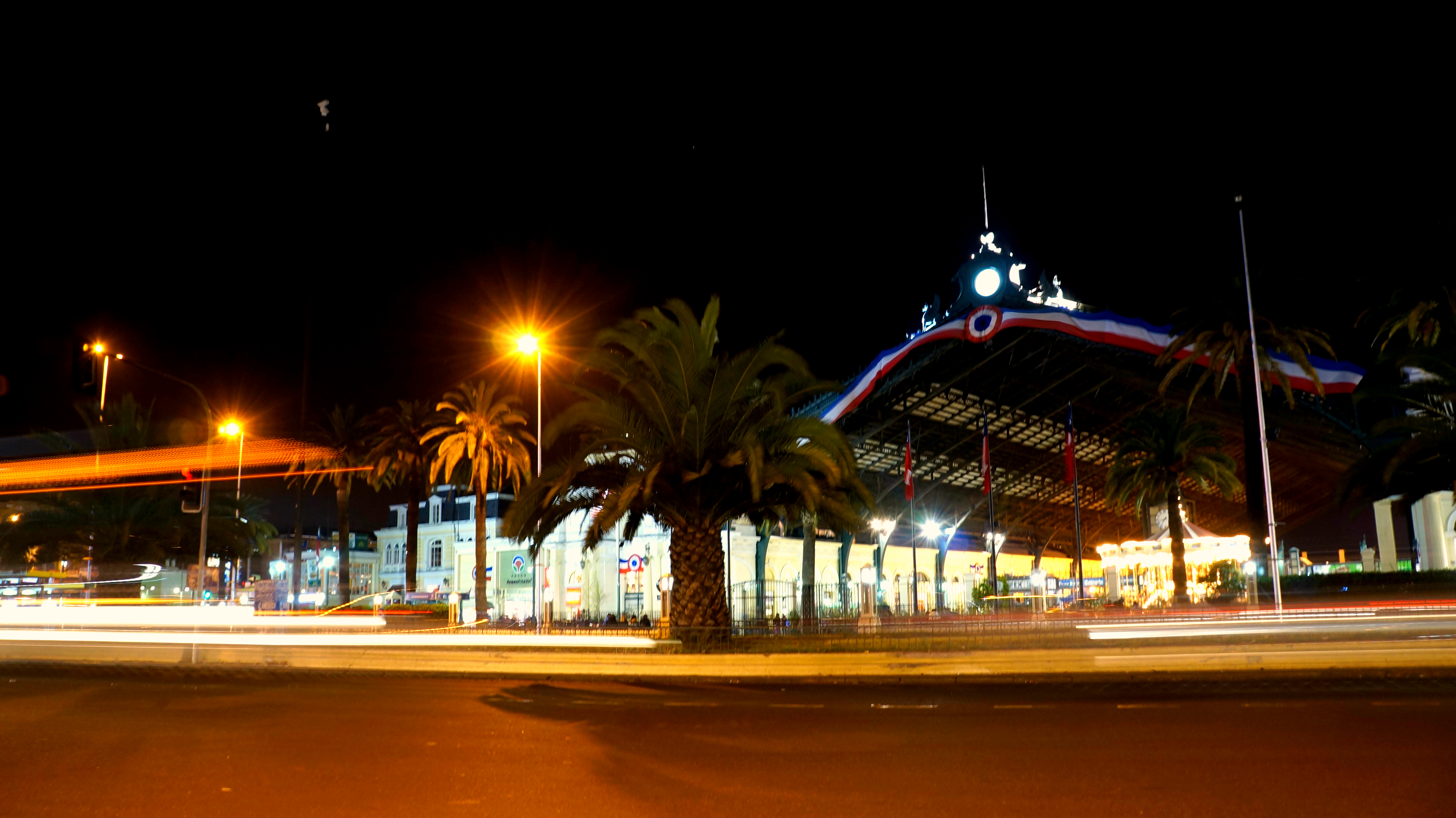
Night view

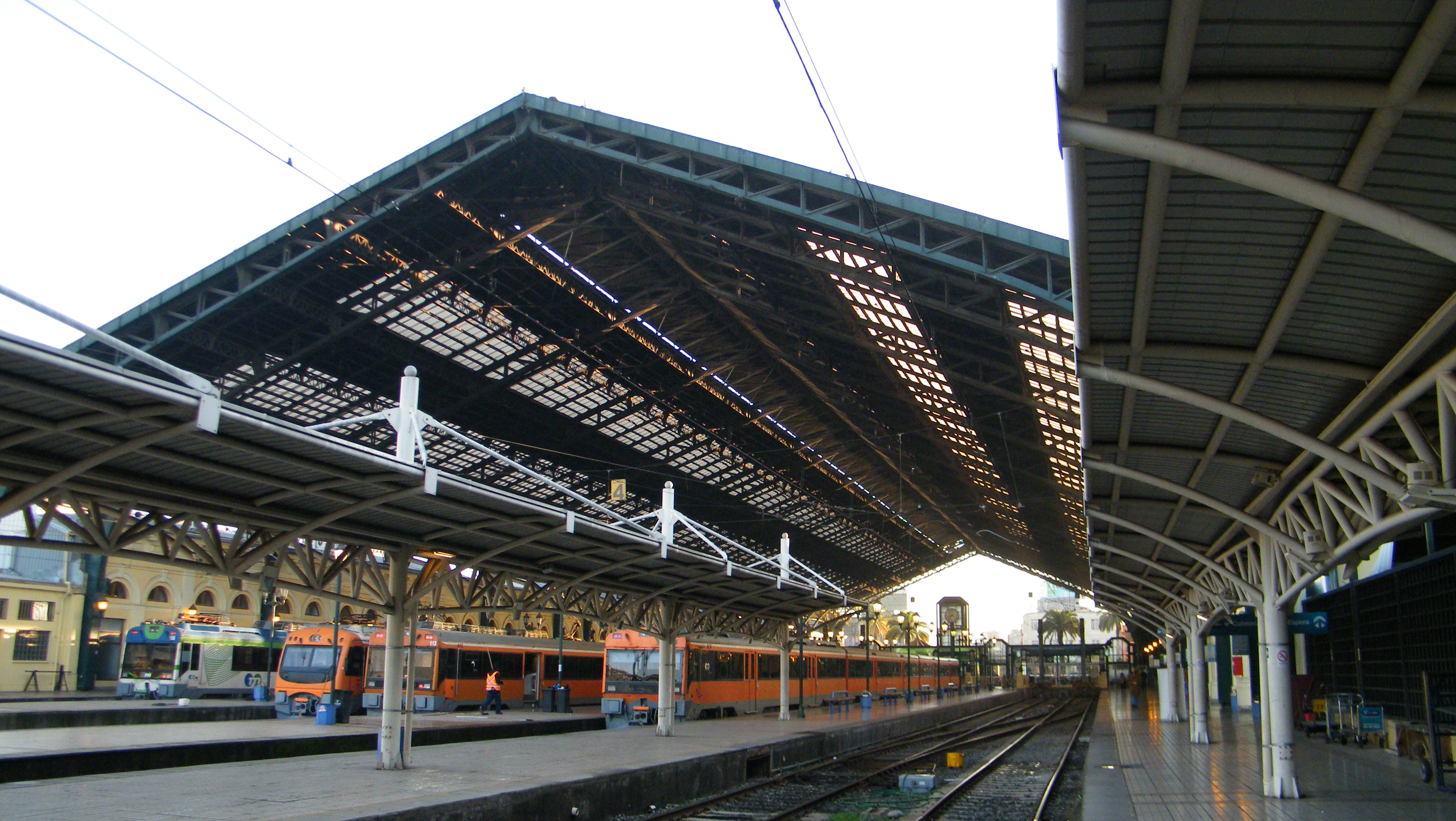
Platforms

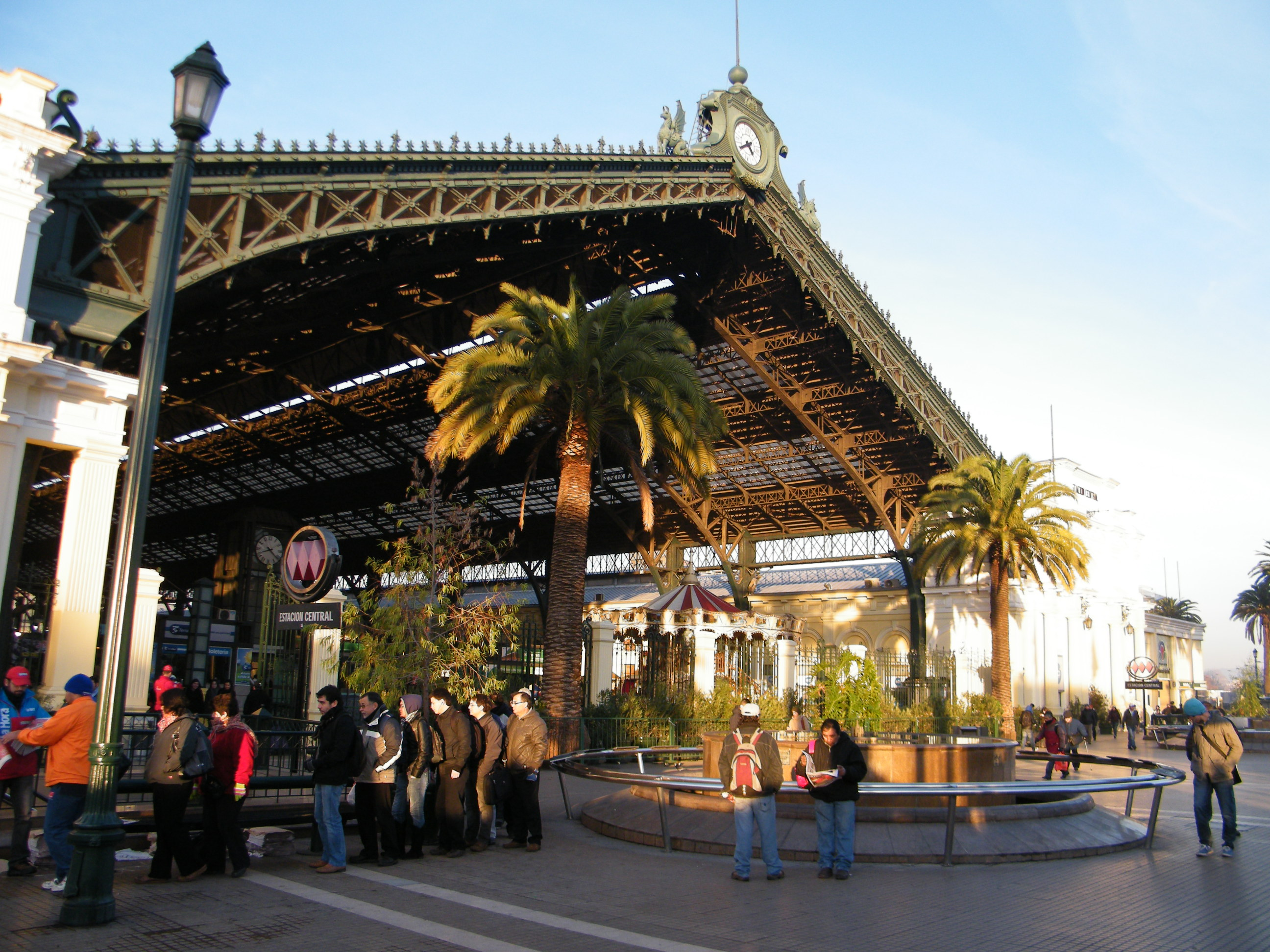
External view
