= Chillán railway station =

Railway station in Chillán, Chile

Estación Chillán
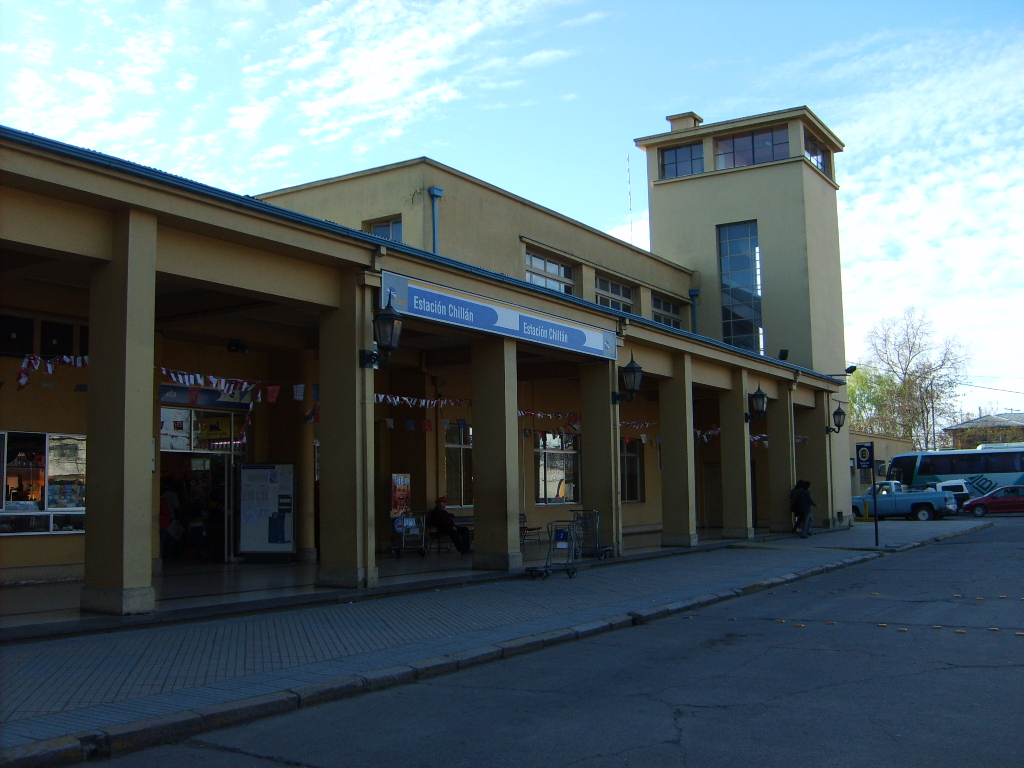
- Estación Chillán Building

General information
- Location: Avenida Brasil 444, Chillán, Chile
- Coordinates: 36°36′14″S 72°06′44″W
- System: Terminal
- Owner: Empresa de los Ferrocarriles del Estado
- Line: Red Sur EFE
- Tracks: 2

History
- Opened: 1873

Services
Preceding station	Empresa de los Ferrocarriles del Estado	Following station
San Carlos towards Santiago	TerraSur	Terminus
Talca towards Santiago	Alameda-Temuco	Laja towards Temuco
San Carlos towards Parral	Parral-Chillán	Terminus
Location

Estación Chillán is a railway station of the Empresa de los Ferrocarriles del Estado, located in Chillán, Chile. It is the main railway station in the Ñuble Region. It is located on Brasil avenue.

Estación Chillán is part of the Red Sur EFE, the TerraSur inter-city service has its final stop here.

Previously the Red Sur EFE continued from here to the south; to the city of Temuco, but the passenger service was definitively closed in 2009.

The nearby Maria Teresa Bus Terminal is within walking distance from the Station.

== Lines and trains ==
The following lines and trains terminate at Estación Chillán:

- Red Sur EFE
  - TerraSur inter-city service (Alameda - Estación Chillán)

== Adjacent stations ==
←	Service	→
Estación San Carlos	Red Sur EFE	Terminus

== See also ==
- La Calera railway station
