= Empresa de los Ferrocarriles del Estado =

State-owned railway company in Chile

Empresa de los Ferrocarriles del Estado (EFE)

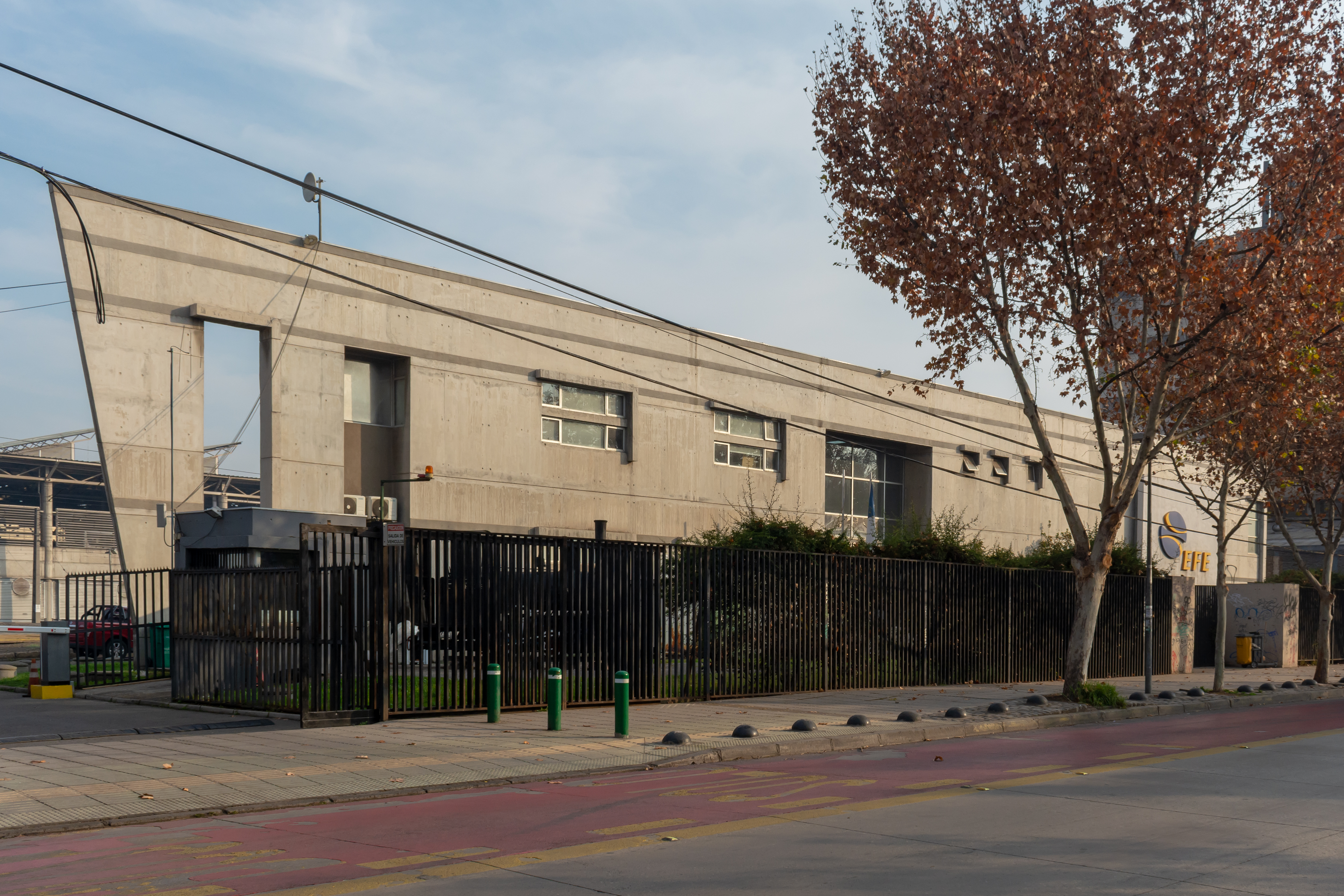
- EFE headquarters in Santiago pictured in 2022

Overview
- Operator: Ministry of Transportation
- Headquarters: Santiago
- Reporting mark: EFE
- Dates of operation: 1884; 142 years ago–
- Predecessor: Various private and state owned railways

Technical
- Track gauge: 1,676 mm (5 ft 6 in)

Other
- Website: efe.cl

Empresa de los Ferrocarriles del Estado (abbreviated EFE, lit. State Railway Company) is the national railway and the oldest state-run enterprise in Chile. It manages the infrastructure and operating rail services in the country.

== Track gauge ==
The track gauge is Indian gauge 1,676 mm (5 ft 6 in) in the south and 1,000 mm (3 ft 3 3/8 in) metre gauge in the north. The Santiago Metro uses 1,435 mm (4 ft 8 1/2 in) standard gauge.

== History ==
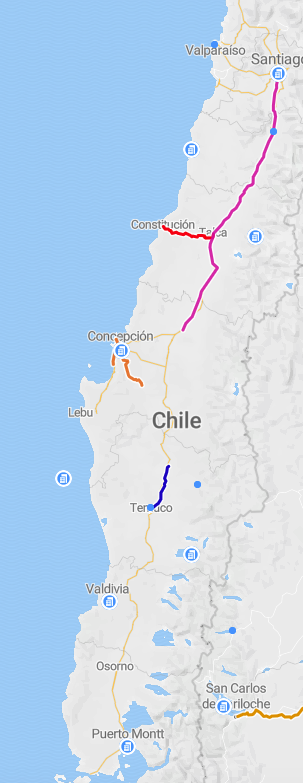
Map of passenger trains network

The company was created on January 4, 1884 by means of the purchase of the companies that exploited the longitudinal routes and the Santiago – Valparaíso route.The reform followed the War of the Pacific (1879–1883), which had exposed the inefficiencies of running Chile's state railways under separate administrations; President Domingo Santa María called an extraordinary session of Congress that placed every state line under a single director general. Since then, the company acquired the railways of the sodium nitrate mining companies in the north of Chile. From 1913 on the network of the EFE extends from Iquique to Puerto Montt. Apart from the company, Chilean Army also built a 60 kilometres (37 mi) small rail line, known to be Puente Alto-El Volcan Railway for Military purpose to safeguard from Argentina attacks, which were opened in 1914 and closed during 1985. (more translation from es:Empresa de los Ferrocarriles del Estado#Historia to come)

A stable political and economic climate allowed EFE to start its largest-ever investment programme during the administration of Ricardo Lagos. This involved the spending of US$1 billion between 2003 and 2005, in order to increase capacity on commuter networks and improved long-distance services, as well as reconnecting Santiago with Puerto Montt via Temuco. Unfortunately, the project was involved in a series of corruption scandals and bad administration. The long-distance service trains, bought from the Spanish railway company Renfe, had serious flaws, and the service to Puerto Montt was closed some months later. This situation, triggered investigations from the government, who exposed the crisis of the company due to the administration mistakes. It would be only in 2025 when services to Puerto Montt finally returned, first as a pilot local service.

Since 2018, the company has been revitalized, thanks to the state investments during the administrations of Michelle Bachelet, Sebastián Piñera and Gabriel Boric, as well as the reestablishment and renovation of old routes, complemented with the integration of some of the EFE's passenger routes with the Santiago, Valparaíso and Concepción public transport systems.

== Subsidiaries ==
=== Passenger rail ===
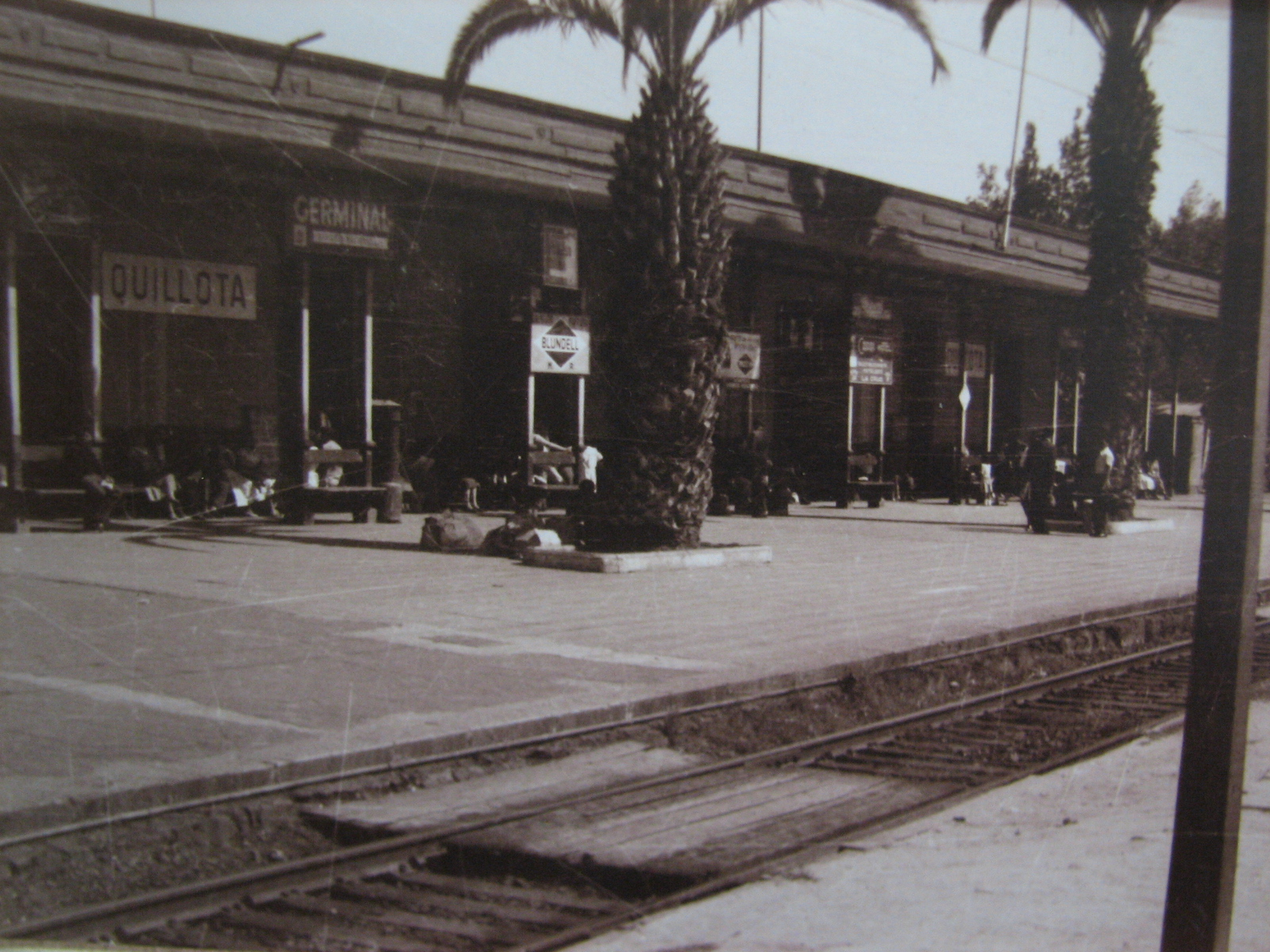
Quillota railway station.

- Metro Regional de Valparaíso (MERVAL S.A.): Commuter rail on the Valparaíso Region
  - Operates the Valparaíso Metro, the commuter trains between Puerto Station in Valparaíso and Limache Station on the Valparaíso Region.
- Ferrocarriles Suburbanos de Concepción (Fesub Concepción S.A.): Commuter rail on the Biobío Region and Araucanía Region
  - Operates the Biotren, the commuter service trains between Talcahuano's Mercado Station and Hualqui, and from Concepción Station to "Lomas Coloradas" Station in San Pedro de La Paz on the Biobío Region.
  - Operates the Corto del Laja, the commuter service trains between Talcahuano and Laja, on the Biobío Region.
  - Operates the Victoria-Temuco Regional Train, the commuter service train on the Araucanía Region.
- Trenes Metropolitanos: Commuter rail between the Santiago Metropolitan Region and the O'Higgins Region.
  - Operates the Metrotrén, the commuter trains between Santiago to San Fernando and Rancagua.
- Servicio de Trenes Regionales Terra: Inter-city rail between the Santiago Metropolitan Region and the Ñuble Region.
  - Operates the TerraSur, the Inter-city rail service between Santiago and Chillán.
  - Operates the Regional Train Constitution-Talca Ramal between Constitución and Talca, in the Maule Region
- Operates the Tren Llanquihue – Puerto Montt, a Commuter rail between Llanquihue and Puerto Montt, which began services on April 22, 2025, in the Los Lagos Region.

=== Freight services ===
- Ferrocarril del Pacífico S.A. (FEPASA): Cargo between the Valparaíso Region and the Los Lagos Region.
- Transporte Ferroviario Andrés Pirazzoli (TRANSAP): Cargo on the Santiago Metropolitan Region, O'Higgins Region and the Biobío Region.
- Ferronor: Metre gauge cargo line in the northern part of the country
- Ferrocarril de Arica a La Paz

=== Special tourist services ===
- Tren de la Araucanía
- Tren del Recuerdo - a mixed pioneer/tourist heritage service

== Future expansion ==
Proposed future rail infrastructure includes a new, more direct rail line between Santiago and Valparaíso, and expansions of Santiago's commuter rail network to Melipilla and Batuco.

== Rail links with adjacent countries ==
- Bolivia - same gauge 1,000 mm (3 ft 3 3/8 in) - from Arica to La Paz, Bolivia and from Antofagasta to Uyuni, Bolivia
- Argentina - Transandine Railway - abandoned 1984 – 100 km of mountain railway of 1,000 mm (3 ft 3 3/8 in) gauge with rack railway sections - break of gauge 1,676 mm (5 ft 6 in)/1,000 mm (3 ft 3 3/8 in) at either end. Concession planned to re-open line.
- Another line connecting two countries is the Salta-Antofagasta, single 1,000 mm (3 ft 3 3/8 in) gauge.
- Peru - a single 1,435 mm (4 ft 8 1/2 in) standard gauge connection, the Tacna-Arica Railway, between the northern Chilean city of Arica and Tacna in Southern Peru. The line closed in 2012, but as of June 2014, there were plans to reopen it. The line has been put back into operation in February 2023.

== See also ==
- Ferrocarril de Antofagasta a Bolivia
- Transportation in Chile
- Santiago Metro
- La Calera railway station
