= Calle 7 season 2 =

Calle 7
- Season 2
- Starring: Martín Cárcamo

Release
- Original network: TVN
- Original release: August 3, 2009 – January 29, 2010

Season chronology
- ← Previous; Season 1 Next → Season 3

The second season of Calle 7 began on Monday, August 3, 2009. The new competitors were presented, and called "Challenging Team", they will team up to compete against the well known "Team Calle 7" that includes the first season winner Francisco "Chapu" Puelles. The competition system is the same as the one utilized in the first season; On Mondays and Wednesdays, the two teams compete in three events, each worth 100, 200 and 300 points. The winner of those days is saved from competing in elimination, while the loser has to compete among themselves on Tuesdays and Thursdays to elect a nominated team member. The elimination competition is on Fridays, and the loser leaves Calle 7 for ever. This season is formally presented Jean Philippe Cretton as the co-host of Calle 7.

The Final was on January 29, 2010 on a prime time schedule (22:00 hours GMT-4) the contestant that became the winner of the 2nd season of Calle 7, for second time, Francisco "Chapu" Puelles taking the big final prize 5 million chilean pesos (US$9,500) a prize that he share 50% with Felipe Camus, so he can continue his dream of studding. Felipe Camus take the second place and obtain 500,000 chilean pesos (US$930), and also a symbolic award "Spirit of Calle 7" for being the one the better shows the values of the program, as clean competition and friendship.

== Teams ==
=== Original teams ===
Yellow team
| Player | Eliminated |
|---|---|
| (Chile) Alain Soulat | |
| (Chile) Belén Muñoz | |
| (Chile) Constanza Vivas | |
| (Chile) Felipe Camus | |
| (Chile) Francisco "Chapu" Puelles | |
| (Chile) Francisco "Pancho" Rodríguez | |
| (Uruguay) Laura Prieto | |
| (Chile) Ronny "Dance" Munizaga | |
| (Chile) Valentina Roth | |
| (Chile) Valeria Ortega | |

Red team
| Player | Eliminated |
|---|---|
| (Chile) Alejandro Arriagada | |
| (Chile) Yuri Gutiérrez | |
| (Chile) Ivana Vargas | |
| (Chile) André Etchever | |
| (Chile) Giordano Barros | |
| (Argentina) Sandra Bustamante | |
| (Argentina) Daniel Fernández | |
| (Chile) Matías Leal | 3rd Eliminated |
| (Chile) Karen Amenábar | 2nd Eliminated |
| (Chile) Andrea Koch | 1st Eliminated |

=== New teams ===
The new teams of the second season of Calle 7 were presented on August 26, 2009, due to the constant defeats suffered by the Red challenging team. It was decided that the teams were not equally balanced, so new teams were created and the following is the new structure:

Yellow team
| Player | Eliminated |
|---|---|
| (Chile) Francisco "Chapu" Puelles | 18th Eliminated and Winner |
| (Chile) Felipe Camus | 2nd Place |
| (Argentina) Daniel Fernández | 3rd Place |
| (Chile) Valentina Roth | 22nd Eliminated |
| (Chile) Valeria Ortega (captain) | 5th and 21st Eliminated |
| (Chile) Alejandro Arriagada | 17th Eliminated |
| (Uruguay) Laura Prieto | 15th Eliminated |
| (Chile) Camila Stuardo | 14th Eliminated |
| (Chile) André Etchever | 12th Eliminated |
| (Chile) Daniel Vergara | 4th and 11th Eliminated |
| (Chile) Solange Grassi | Quit |

Red team
| Player | Eliminated |
|---|---|
| (Chile) Juan Pablo Alfonso (captain) | 4th Place |
| (Chile) Alejandro Arriagada | 20th Eliminated |
| (Uruguay) Laura Prieto | 19th Eliminated |
| (Chile) Francisco "Pancho" Rodríguez | Quit |
| (Chile) Maite Orsini | 18th Eliminated |
| (Chile) Alain Soulat | Quit |
| (Chile) Yuri Gutiérrez | Quit |
| (Chile) Paz Duarte | 16th Eliminated |
| (Chile) Ivana Vargas | 13th Eliminated |
| (Chile) Yesenia Guerrero | 10th Eliminated |
| (Chile) Giordano Barrios | 9th Eliminated |
| (Chile) Juan Pablo Alfonso | 8th Eliminated |
| (Chile) Ronny "Dance" Munizaga | 7th Eliminated |
| (Argentina) Sandra Bustamante | 6th Eliminated |
| (Chile) Constanza Vivas | Quit |
| (Chile) Belén Muñoz | Quit |

== Teams competition ==
| Week | Immunity | 1st Nominated | 2nd Nominated | 3rd Nominated | 4th Nominated | Extra Nominated | Saved | Winner | Eliminated |
|---|---|---|---|---|---|---|---|---|---|
| August 3 — 07 | — | Giordano Barrios | André Etchevers | Andrea Koch | Alejandro Arriagada | — | Alejandro Arriagada | André Etchevers | Andrea Koch |
| August 10 — 15 | — | Matías Leal | Ivana Vargas | Alejandro Arriagada | Sandra Bustamante | ^{[a]}Karen Amenábar | Alejandro and Sandra | Matías Leal | Karen Amenábar |
| August 17 — 21 | — | Sandra Bustamante | Alejandro Arriagada | Matías Leal | André Etchevers | — | Alejandro Arriagada | André Etchevers | Matías Leal |
| August 23 — 28 | Constanza Vivas | Giordano Barrios | Daniel Fernández | Juan Pablo Alfonso | Belén Muñoz | — | Belén Muñoz | Daniel Fernández | ^{[b]}— |
| August 30 — September 4 | Valeria Ortega | André Etchever | Daniel Vergara | Alejandro Arriagada | Francisco "Pancho" Rodríguez | — | — | André Etchever | ^{[c]}Daniel Vergara |
| September 6 — 11 | Constanza Vivas | Francisco "Pancho" Rodríguez | Yuri Gutiérrez | Valeria Ortega | André Etchevers | — | — | Francisco "Pancho" Rodríguez | ^{[d]}Valeria Ortega |
| September 13 — 18 | André Etchever | Ronny "Dance" Munizaga | Felipe Camus | Alain Soulat | — | Sandra Bustamante | — | Alain Soulat | Sandra Bustamante |
| September 20 — 25 | Ivana Vargas | Laura Prieto | — | Daniel Vergara | Alejandro Arriagada | ^{[e]}Ronny "Dance" Munizaga | Laura Prieto | Alejandro Arriagada | Ronny "Dance" Munizaga |
| September 27 — October 2 | Felipe Camus | Giordano Barrios | Daniel Fernández | Juan Pablo Alfonso | Yuri Gutiérrez | — | Daniel Fernández | Giordano Barrios | ^{[f]}Juan Pablo Alfonso |
| October 4 — 09 | Daniel Fernández | Giordano Barrios | Yuri Gutiérrez | Daniel Vergara | Ivana Vargas | — | Daniel Vergara | Yuri Gutiérrez | Giordano Barrios |
| October 11 — 16 | Daniel Vergara | Felipe Camus | Alain Soulat | Juan Pablo Alfonso | Yesenia Guerrero | — | — | Felipe Camus | Yesenia Guerrero |
| October 18 — 23 | Alejandro Arriagada | Daniel Vergara | Maite Orsini | Alain Soulat | Juan Pablo Alfonso | — | Maite Orsini | Juan Pablo Alfonso | Daniel Vergara |
| October 25 — 30 | Laura Prieto | Valeria Ortega | Alejandro Arriagada | Felipe Camus | André Etchevers | Yuri Gutiérrez | Alejandro and Valeria | Felipe Camus | André Etchevers |
| November 1 — 06 | — | Ivana Vargas | Maite Orsini | Laura Prieto | Alejandro Arriagada | Yuri Gutiérrez | Laura and Maite | Yuri Gutiérrez | Ivana Vargas |
| November 8 — 13 | — | Alejandro Arriagada | Alain Soulat | Camila Stuardo | Laura Prieto | — | Laura Prieto | Alain Soulat | Camila Stuardo |
| November 16 — 20 | Yuri Gutiérrez | Paz Duarte | ^{[g]}Francisco "Chapu" Puelles | Maite Orsini | Laura Prieto | — | ^{[h]}— | Francisco "Chapu" Puelles | ^{[i]}Laura Prieto |
| November 23 — 27 | — | Alain Soulat | Maite Orsini | Francisco "Pancho" Rodríguez | Alejandro Arriagada | Paz Duarte | Alejandro and Maite | Pancho and Alain | Paz Duarte |
| November 30 — December 4 | — | Alain Soulat | Daniel Fernández | Alejandro Arriagada | ^{[j]}— | — | — | Daniel Fernández | ^{[k]}Alejandro Arriagada |
| December 7 — 11 | — | Maite Orsini | Daniel Fernández | Alejandro Arriagada | Francisco "Chapu" Puelles | — | Maite Orsini | Daniel Fernández | ^{[l]}Francisco "Chapu" Puelles |

^{^[a]}nominated due to injury in the previous week
^{^[b]}Belén Muñoz leaving the competition
^{^[c]}replacing Solange Grassi
^{^[d]}replacing Constanza Vivas
^{^[e]}Ronny was injured the week prior
^{^[f]}replacing Valentina Roth
^{^[g]}Francisco "Chapu" Puelles replaces Valeria Ortega as the nominated one
^{^[h]}Paz Duarte presented an injury
^{^[i]}winner of the repechaje
^{^[j]}Yuri Gutierrez missed
^{^[k]}replacing Yuri Gutierrez
^{^[l]}replacing Alain Soulat

== Individual competition ==
| Week | 1st Nominated | 2nd Nominated | 3rd Nominated | 4th Nominated | Week's Winner | Saved | Winner | Eliminated |
|---|---|---|---|---|---|---|---|---|
| December 14 — 18 | Maite Orsini | Laura Prieto | Daniel Fernández | Valentina Roth | Francisco "Pancho" Rodríguez | Valentina Roth | Daniel Fernández | Maite Orsini |
| December 21 — 25 | Laura Prieto | Valeria Ortega | Valentina Roth | Francisco "Chapu" Puelles | Daniel Fernández | ^{[m]}— | Valentina Roth | ^{[n]}Laura Prieto |
| December 28, 2009 — January 1, 2010 | Valeria Ortega | Alejandro Arriagada | Laura Prieto | ^{[o]}— | Felipe Camus | ^{[o]}— | ^{[p]}Valeria and Alejandro | Laura Prieto |
| January 4 — 08 | Valentina Roth | Alejandro Arriagada | Valeria Ortega | Daniel Fernández | Francisco "Chapu" Puelles | Valentina Roth | ^{[q]}Daniel Fernández | Alejandro Arriagada |
| January 11 — 15 | Daniel Fernández | Juan Pablo Afonso | Valeria Ortega | ^{[r]}Valentina Roth | Felipe Camus | Valentina Roth | Daniel Fernández | Valeria Ortega |
| January 18 — 22 | Valentina Roth | Juan Pablo Afonso | Daniel Fernández | Francisco "Chapu" Puelles | Felipe Camus | Francisco "Chapu" Puelles | ^{[s]}Daniel and Juan Pablo | Valentina Roth |

^{^[m]}none because the Christmas parades
^{^[n]}none because the team is celebrating Christmas
^{^[o]}none because New Year
^{^[p]}both winners
^{^[q]}substituted by Alain Soulat
^{^[r]}substituted bt Constanza Vivas
^{^[s]}both winners

| Final Week | 1st Nominated | 2nd Nominated | 3rd Nominated | Eliminated | Semi Finalists | Finalists | Winner |
|---|---|---|---|---|---|---|---|
| January 25 — 29 | Daniel Fernández | Juan Pablo Afonso | Felipe Camus | Felipe Camus | Francisco "Chapu" Puelles; Daniel Fernández; Juan Pablo Alfonso | Francisco "Chapu" Puelles^{[t]}Felipe Camus | Francisco "Chapu" Puelles |

^{^[t]}send directly to the big final by the public

== Elimination order ==
| Contestants | Team | Weeks | | | | | | | | | | | | | | | | | | | | | | | | | |
| Contestants | Team | 1 | 2 | 3 | 4 | 5 | 6 | 7 | 8 | 9 | 10 | 11 | 12 | 13 | 14 | 15 | 16 | 17 | 18 | 19 | 20 | 21 | 22 | 23 | 24 | 25 | 26 |
|---|---|---|---|---|---|---|---|---|---|---|---|---|---|---|---|---|---|---|---|---|---|---|---|---|---|---|---|
| Francisco P | Yellow | IN | IN | IN | IN | IN | IN | IN | IN | IN | IN | IN | IN | IN | IN | IN | LOW | IN | IN | OUT | IN | LOW | IN | IN | IN | LOW | WINNER |
| Felipe | Yellow | IN | IN | IN | IN | IN | IN | LOW | IN | IN | IN | LOW | IN | LOW | IN | IN | IN | IN | IN | IN | IN | IN | IN | IN | IN | IN | 2nd |
| Daniel F | Yellow | | | IN | LOW | IN | IN | IN | IN | LOW | IN | IN | IN | IN | IN | IN | IN | IN | LOW | LOW | LOW | IN | IN | LOW | LOW | LOW | OUT |
| Juan Pablo | Red | | | | LOW | IN | IN | IN | IN | OUT | IN | LOW | LOW | IN | IN | IN | IN | IN | IN | IN | IN | IN | IN | IN | LOW | LOW | OUT |
| Valentina | Yellow | IN | IN | IN | IN | IN | IN | IN | IN | IN | QUIT | | | | | | | IN | IN | IN | LOW | LOW | IN | LOW | LOW | OUT | |
| Valeria | Yellow | IN | IN | IN | IN | IN | OUT | IN | IN | IN | IN | IN | IN | LOW | IN | IN | IN | IN | IN | IN | IN | LOW | LOW | LOW | OUT | | |
| Alejandro | Red | LOW | LOW | LOW | IN | LOW | IN | IN | LOW | IN | IN | IN | IN | LOW | LOW | LOW | IN | LOW | OUT | LOW | IN | IN | LOW | OUT | | | |
| Laura | Red | IN | IN | IN | IN | IN | IN | IN | LOW | IN | IN | IN | IN | IN | LOW | LOW | OUT | | IN | IN | LOW | LOW | OUT | | | | |
| Francisco R | Red | IN | IN | IN | IN | LOW | LOW | IN | IN | IN | IN | IN | IN | IN | IN | IN | IN | LOW | IN | IN | IN | IN | QUIT | | | | |
| Maite | Red | | | | | | | | | | IN | IN | LOW | IN | LOW | IN | LOW | LOW | IN | LOW | OUT | | | | | | |
| Alain | Red | IN | IN | IN | IN | IN | IN | LOW | IN | IN | IN | LOW | LOW | IN | IN | LOW | IN | LOW | LOW | IN | QUIT | | | | | | |
| Yuri | Red | IN | IN | IN | IN | IN | LOW | IN | IN | LOW | LOW | IN | IN | LOW | LOW | IN | IN | IN | IN | QUIT | | | | | | | |
| Paz | Red | | | | | | | | | | | | | IN | IN | IN | LOW | OUT | | | | | | | | | |
| Camila | Yellow | | | | | | | | | | | | | IN | IN | OUT | | | | | | | | | | | |
| Ivana | Red | IN | LOW | IN | IN | IN | IN | IN | IN | IN | LOW | IN | IN | IN | OUT | | | | | | | | | | | | |
| André | Yellow | LOW | IN | LOW | IN | LOW | LOW | IN | IN | IN | IN | IN | IN | OUT | | | | | | | | | | | | | |
| Daniel V | Yellow | | | | IN | OUT | IN | IN | LOW | IN | LOW | IN | OUT | | | | | | | | | | | | | | |
| Yessenia | Red | | | | | | | IN | IN | IN | IN | OUT | | | | | | | | | | | | | | | |
| Giordano | Red | LOW | IN | IN | LOW | IN | IN | IN | IN | LOW | OUT | | | | | | | | | | | | | | | | |
| Ronny | Red | IN | IN | IN | IN | IN | IN | LOW | OUT | | | | | | | | | | | | | | | | | | |
| Sandra | Red | IN | LOW | LOW | INJURY | INJURY | INJURY | OUT | | | | | | | | | | | | | | | | | | | |
| Constanza | Red | IN | IN | IN | IN | IN | IN | QUIT | | | | | | | | | | | | | | | | | | | |
| Solange | Yellow | | | | IN | IN | QUIT | | | | | | | | | | | | | | | | | | | | |
| Belén | Red | IN | IN | IN | QUIT | | | | | | | | | | | | | | | | | | | | | | |
| Matías | Red | IN | LOW | OUT | | | | | | | | | | | | | | | | | | | | | | | |
| Karen | Red | IN | OUT | | | | | | | | | | | | | | | | | | | | | | | | |
| Andrea | Red | OUT | | | | | | | | | | | | | | | | | | | | | | | | | |
| Stephanie | Red | QUIT | | | | | | | | | | | | | | | | | | | | | | | | | |
