= Calle 7 season 4 =

Calle 7
- Season 4
- Starring: Martín Cárcamo; Jean Philippe Cretton; Valeria Ortega (on calle7.cl)

Release
- Original network: TVN
- Original release: June 7, 2010 – November 2010

Season chronology
- ← Previous; Season 3 Next → Season 5

The fourth season begin on June 7, 2010 showing the new contestants. On June 8, 2010 the couples were announced for both teams. It was also announced that at the time of nomination, both partners would be nominated. At the beginning of this season the horary was changed to 16:00 hrs and a few days was not aired due to the 2010 World Cup. On July 12 the singer Karen Paola joined Calle 7 after leaving Yingo.

== Teams ==
=== Original teams ===
Yellow team
Player	Eliminated
(Chile) Francisco "Chapu" Puelles	
(Uruguay) Laura Prieto
(Chile) Felipe Camus	
(Chile) Catalina Vallejos
(Chile) Juan Pablo Alfonso	
(Chile) Katherina Contreras
(Chile) Maite Orsini	
(Ecuador) Juan Carlos "JC" Palma
(Chile) Karen Paola	
(Chile) Alain Soulat
(Chile) Sebastian Longhi	3rd Eliminated
(Chile) Thiare Figueroa	2nd Eliminated
(Chile) Ronny "Dance" Munizaga	1st Eliminated

Red team
Player	Eliminated
(Argentina) Federico Koch	
(Chile) Camila Andrade
(Chile) Francisco "Pancho" Rodríguez	
(Chile) Katherine Bodis
(Chile) Phillipe Trillat	
(Chile) Paz Gómez
(Chile) Camila Nash	
(Chile) Alejandro Arriagada	Quit
(Argentina) Eliana Albasetti	5th Eliminated
(Chile) Angélica Gutiérrez	4th Eliminated

=== New teams ===
Yellow team
Player	Eliminated
(Chile) Francisco "Chapu" Puelles	2nd place
(Chile) Camila Nash	2nd place
(Ecuador) Juan Carlos "JC" Palma	20th eliminated
(Chile) Maite Orsini	20th eliminated
(Uruguay) Laura Prieto	17th eliminated
(Chile) Alejandro Quagliotti	19th and 14th Eliminated
(Chile) Katherina Contreras	13th Eliminated
(Uruguay) Juan Pedro Verdier	12th Eliminated
(Argentina) Federico Koch	11th Eliminated
(Argentina) Eliana Albasetti	10th Eliminated
(Chile) Alejandro Arriagada	Quit
(Chile) Paz Gómez	Quit
(Chile) Alain Soulat	Quit

Red team
Player	Eliminated
(Chile) Felipe Camus	Winners
(Chile) Catalina Vallejos	Winners
(Uruguay) Juan Pedro Verdier	3rd place
(Chile) Katherine Bodis	3rd place
(Chile) Juan Pablo Alfonso	21st eliminated
(Chile) Karen Paola	19th eliminated
(Chile) Phillipe Trillat	18th and 9th Eliminated
(Chile) Camila Andrade	16th eliminated
(Chile) Katherine Bodis	6th Eliminated
(Argentina) Eliana Albasetti	Quit
(Chile) Francisco "Pancho" Rodríguez	Quit

== Teams competition ==
Week	1st Nominated	2nd Nominated	3rd Nominated	4th Nominated	Extra Nominated	Saved	Winner	Eliminated
June 7–11	—	Katherina C. and Juan Pablo	Angélica and JC	Camila N. and Alejandro A.	—	—	Katherina C. and Juan Pablo	^{[a]}—
June 14–18	Angélica and JC	Paz and Phillipe	Thiare and Ronny	Maite and Longhi	—	Maite and Longhi	Angélica and JC	Ronny "Dance" Munizaga
June 21 – July 1	Eliana and Alain	Katherine B. and Pancho	^{[b]}Thiare Figueroa	Katherina C. and Juan Pablo	^{[c]}Maite and Longhi	Maite and Longhi; Katherina C. and Juan Pablo	Katherine B. and Pancho	Thiare Figueroa
July 5–9	Katherina C. and Juan Pablo	Katherine B. and Pancho	Maite and Longhi	Eliana and Alain	—	Katherina C. and Juan Pablo	Katherine B. and Pancho	Sebastian Longhi
July 12–16	^{[d]}—	Katherina C. and Juan Pablo	Camila A. and Federico	Angélica and JC	—	—	Katherina C. and Juan Pablo	Angélica Gutiérrez
July 19–23	Laura and Chapu	Camila A. and Federico	Eliana and Alain	Maite and JC	—	Laura and Chapu	Camila A. and Federico	Eliana Albasetti
July 26–30	Catalina and Felipe	Camila N. and ^{[e]}Alejandro	Camila A. and Federico	^{[f]}Katherine B. and Pancho	—	Camila A. and Federico	Catalina and Felipe	^{[g]}—
August 2–6	Laura and Federico	Camila A. and Juan Pablo	^{[h]}Karen and Pancho	Katherine B. and Philippe	—	Laura and Federico	Karen and Pancho	Katherine Bodis
August 9–13	Katherina C. and Chapu	Karen Paola and Pancho	Laura and Federico	^{[i]}Camila Nash	—	Karen Paola and Pancho	Laura and Federico	Francisco "Chapu" Puelles
August 16–20	Laura and Federico	Camila N. and Alain	Katherina C. and Juan Pedro	^{[j]}Paz and Philippe	—	Laura and Federico	Paz and Philippe	Camila Nash
August 23–27	Maite and JC	Paz and Philippe	Katherina C. and Juan Pedro	Camila A. and Juan Pablo	—	Katherina C. and Juan Pedro	Maite and JC	Philippe Trillat
August 30 – September 3	Karen and Pancho	^{[k]}Eliana and Alain	Katherina C. and Juan Pedro	Camila A. and Juan Pablo	—	Karen Paola and Pancho	Katherina C. and Juan Pedro	Eliana Albasetti
September 6–10	Camila A. and Juan Pablo	Laura and ^{[l]}Federico	Karen and Pancho	Katherina C. and Juan Pedro	—	Karen and Pancho	Camila A. and Juan Pablo	Federico Koch
September 13–16	Laura and Alain	Maite and JC	Katherina C. and Juan Pedro	—	—	—	Laura and Alain	^{[m]}—
September 20–24	Camila A. and Juan Pablo	Catalina and Felipe	Katherina C. and Juan Pedro	—	—	—	Camila A. and Juan Pablo	Juan Pedro Verdier
September 27 – October 1	Karen and Pancho	Camila A. and Juan Pablo	^{[n]}Laura and Alain	Katherina C. and Alejandro Q.	—	Karen and Pancho	Camila A. and Juan Pablo	Katherina Contreras
October 4–8	Laura Prieto and Alain	^{[o]}Maite and JC	^{[p]}Alejandro Quagliotti	Camila N. and ^{[o]}Chapu.	—	Laura Prieto and Alain	Camila N. and Chapu	Alejandro Quagliotti
October 11–15	Maite and JC	Laura and Alejandro A.	Camila N. and Chapu	—	—	—	Maite and JC	^{[q]}—
October 18–22	Laura and Alejandro A.	Eliana and Juan Pedro	Karen and Phillipe	^{[r]}Maite and JC	—	—	Maite and JC	Juan Pedro Verdier
October 25–29	^{[s]}Eliana Albasetti	Karen and Phillipe	Laura and ^{[t]}Alejandro A.	Camila A. and Juan Pablo	—	—	Eliana Albasetti	Camila Andrade
November 1 – 5	Laura and Alejandro A.	Camila N. and Chapu	—	—	—	—	Camila N. and Chapu	Laura Prieto
November 1 – 5	Katherine B. and Juan Pablo	Alejando Arriagada	Karen and Phillipe	Maite and JC	—	Maite and JC	^{[u]}Alejando Arriagada	Philippe Trillat

^{^[a]}week for training
^{^[b]}competed with Longhi
^{^[c]}nominated on July 1
^{^[d]}release of the telenovela 40 y tantos
^{^[e]}replaced by Phillipe
^{^[f]}replaced by Paz
^{^[g]}on Monday, the teams were changed
^{^[h]}replaced by Paz
^{^[i]}competed with JC
^{^[j]}replaced by Camila A.
^{^[k]}replacing Paz
^{^[l]}replaced by JC
^{^[m]}none for the bicentennial
^{^[n]}replaced by Maite
^{^[o]}Maite and Francisco P. were replaced by Paz Gómez and Phillipe due to a trip to the USA
^{^[p]}Laura P. was his partner
^{^[q]}none due to the Chilean Miners Rescue
^{^[r]}replaced by Camila Nash
^{^[s]}competed with Felipe
^{^[t]}replaced by JC
^{^[u]}replaced by Chapu and Maite

== Individual competition ==
Week	1st Eliminated	2nd Eliminated	3rd Eliminated	Semi-finalists	Finalists	Winners
November 8–13	Karen and Alejandro Q.	Maite and JC	Katherine B. and Juan Pablo	Catalina and Felipe; Camila N. and Chapu; Katherine B. and Juan Pedro	Camila N. and Chapu; Catalina and Felipe	Catalina and Felipe
