= Calle 7 season 3 =

Calle 7
- Season 3
- Starring: Martín Cárcamo; Jean Philippe Cretton; Valeria Ortega (on calle7.cl)

Release
- Original network: TVN
- Original release: March 15 – June 5, 2010

Season chronology
- ← Previous; Season 2 Next → Season 4

The third season began with a small pre-season on February 1, 2010 and consisted on competing teams for money. At the end of this pre-season all the money raised so far was donated to the victims of the earthquake of February 27 that affected Chile.

The new season of Calle 7 started on March 15, 2010, with new players and game mode in couples. Like a previous seasons the nominees were chosen every day according to the team that lost, in this case the couple. The couple with less score of elimination on Friday and was eliminated by a sealed envelope from the beginning of the program knew whether it was male or female.

The grand finale was on June 5 and the winners were the winner of Pelotón Francisco "Pancho" Rodríguez and Maite Orsini, winning 6 million Chilean pesos, the second place was Federico Koch and Camila Nash winning 1 million Chilean pesos. The "Spirit of Calle 7" award was won by Alain Soulat.

== Teams ==
=== Pre-season ===
| Yellow team: Player / Money; (Chile) Alain Soulat (captain) / $180.000 of Chilean pesos; (Chile) Alejandro Arriagada / $180.000 of Chilean pesos; (Chile) Constanza Vivas / $180.000 of Chilean pesos; (Argentina) Daniel Fernández / $180.000 of Chilean pesos; (Argentina) Florencia Gabardós / $180.000 of Chilean pesos; (Chile) Francisco "Chapu" Puelles / $180.000 of Chilean pesos; (Chile) Maite Orsini / $180.000 of Chilean pesos; (Chile) Rosemarie Segura / $180.000 of Chilean pesos | Red team: Player / Money; (Chile) Valentina Roth (captain) / $754.000 of Chilean pesos; (Chile) Felipe Camus / $754.000 of Chilean pesos; (Uruguay) Laura Prieto / $754.000 of Chilean pesos; (Chile) Juan Pablo Alfonso / $754.000 of Chilean pesos; (Argentina) Federico Koch / $754.000 of Chilean pesos; (Chile) Francisco Barrera / $754.000 of Chilean pesos; (Chile) Valeria Ortega / $754.000 of Chilean pesos |

=== Season 3 ===
Yellow team
| Player | Eliminated |
|---|---|
| (Chile) Francisco "Pancho" Rodríguez | 12th Eliminated and Winner |
| (Argentina) Federico Koch | 9th Eliminated and 2nd Place |
| (Chile) Camila Nash | 14th Eliminated and 2nd Place |
| (Chile) Alain Soulat | 14th Eliminated |
| (Chile) Katherina Contreras | 12th Eliminated |
| (Chile) Katherine Bodis | 11th Eliminated |
| (Uruguay) Laura Prieto | 10th Eliminated |
| (Argentina) Daniel Fernández | Quit |
| (Chile) Valeria Ortega | Quit |
| (Argentina) Eliana Albasetti | 4th Eliminated |
| (Ecuador) Juan Carlos "JC" Palma | 3rd Eliminated |
| (Chile) Valentina Roth | Quit |
| (Chile) Francisco Barrena | Quit |

Red team
| Player | Eliminated |
|---|---|
| (Chile) Maite Orsini | 13th Eliminated and Winner |
| (Chile) Francisco "Chapu" Puelles | 3rd Place |
| (Argentina) Eliana Albasetti | 3rd Place |
| (Chile) Catalina Vallejos | 4th Place |
| (Chile) Juan Pablo Alfonso | 4th Place |
| (Chile) Phillipe Trillat | 13th Eliminated |
| (Chile) Alejandro Arriagada | 8th Eliminated |
| (Chile) Ronny "Dance" Munizaga | 7th Eliminated |
| (Chile) Paz Gómez | 6th Eliminated |
| (Chile) Thiare Figueroa | Quit |
| (Chile) Felipe Camus | 5th Eliminated |
| (Chile) Pedro Acosta | 2nd Eliminated |
| (Argentina) Sandra Bustamante | 1st Eliminated |

== Teams competition ==
| Week | 1st Nominated | 2nd Nominated | 3rd Nominated | 4th Nominated | Nominated by the public | Extra Nominated | Saved | Winner | Eliminated |
|---|---|---|---|---|---|---|---|---|---|
| March 15–19 | ^{[a]}— | Maite and Pedro | Sandra and Ronny | Camila and Francisco B. | Paz and Felipe | — | Maite and Pedro | Paz and Felipe | Sandra Bustamante |
| March 22–26 | Catalina and Alejandro | Maite and Pedro | Thiare and Chapu | Paz and Felipe | Camila and Federico | — | Thiare and Chapu | Camila and Federico | Pedro Acosta |
| March 29 – April 1 | Catalina and Alejandro | Maite and Ronny | Thiare and Chapu | ^{[b]}— | Paz and Felipe | — | — | Maite and Ronny | ^{[c]}— |
| April 5–09 | Maite and Ronny | Thiare and Chapu | Eliana and Daniel | Katherina C. and JC | Camila and Federico | — | Thiare and Chapu | Maite and Ronny | Juan Carlos Palma |
| April 12–16 | Eliana and Daniel | Laura and Juan Pablo | Valeria and Alain | Camila and Federico | Thiare and Chapu | — | Laura and Juan Pablo | Valeria and Alain | ^{[d]}Eliana Albasetti |
| April 19–23 | Katherina C. and Daniel | Catalina and Alejandro | Maite and Ronny | Paz and Felipe | Camila and Federico | — | Catalina and Alejandro | ^{[e]}Maite and Ronny | Felipe Camus |
| April 26–30 | ^{[f]}^{[g]}Maite and Ronny | Katherine B. and Alain | Catalina and Alejandro | Katherina C. and ^{[h]}Daniel | — | — | Catalina and Alejandro | Katherina C. and Daniel | ^{[i]}— |
| May 3–07 | ^{[j]}— | Katherine B. and Alain | Katherina C. and Pancho | Maite and Phillipe | ^{[k]}Paz and Ronny | — | Maite and Phillipe | Katherina C. and Pancho | Paz Gómez |
| May 10–14 | Catalina and Alejandro | Maite and Phillipe | ^{[l]}Ronny | ^{[m]}Camila and Federico | — | ^{[n]}Eliana and Chapu | Eliana and Chapu; Catalina and Alejandro | Maite and Phillipe | Ronny "Dance" Munizaga |
| May 17–21 | Eliana and Chapu | Catalina and Alejandro | Katherina C. and Pancho | — | — | — | — | Katherina C. and Pancho | Alejandro Arriagada |
| May 17–21 | Eliana and Chapu | ^{[o]}Catalina | Camila and Federico | — | — | — | — | ^{[p]}Catalina | Federico Koch |
| May 24–28 | Laura and Juan Pablo | Katherina C. and Pancho | Maite and Phillipe | — | — | — | — | Katherina C. and Pancho | Laura Prieto |
| May 24–28 | Eliana and Chapu | Katherine B. and Alain | Katherina C. and Pancho | — | — | — | — | Katherina C. and Pancho | Katherine Bodis |

^{^[a]}introduced the new season and the new contestants
^{^[b]}Good Friday, Easter
^{^[c]}Easter Week
^{^[d]}rejoined as partner of Chapu
^{^[e]}replaced by Catalina Vallejos
^{^[f]}replaced by Paz
^{^[g]}replaced by Eliana
^{^[h]}replaced by Federico
^{^[i]}Katherine B. had 2 weeks of immunity
^{^[j]}Maite talk about her legal problems
^{^[k]}nominated by the Yellow team
^{^[l]}competed with Paz
^{^[m]}nominated because all the Red team was nominated
^{^[n]}Eliana threw a shoe at the judge
^{^[o]}competed with Daniel
^{^[p]}competed with Felipe

== Individual competition ==
| Days | 1st Competition | 2nd Competition | 3rd Competition | Winner of the Day | Eliminated Partner |
|---|---|---|---|---|---|
| May 31 | Camila and Alain | Maite and Phillipe | Katherina C. and Pancho | ^{[q]}Catalina and Juan Pablo | Katherina Contreras and Francisco "Pancho" Rodríguez |
| June 1–02 | Catalina and Juan Pablo | Maite and Phillipe | Eliana and Chapu | Eliana and Chapu | Maite Orsini and Phillipe Trillat |
| June 3— 04 | Eliana and Chapu | Catalina and Juan Pablo | Camila and Alain | Catalina and Juan Pablo | Camila Nash and Alain Soulat |

^{^[q]}none had a partner

=== Final ===
Semi-finals
Catalina and Juan Pablo | Lost
^{[r]}Camila and Federico | Win
Eliana and Chapu | Lost
^{[s]}Maite and Pancho | Win

Final
Camila and Federico | Runners-up
Maite and Pancho | Winners

^{^[r]}chosen by their partners
^{^[s]}chosen by the public

== Elimination order ==
| Contestants | Team | Weeks 1–11 | | | | | | | | | | | | | Week 12 | | | | | |
| Contestants | Team | 1 | 2 | 3 | 4 | 5 | 6 | 7 | 8 | 9 | 10 | | 11 | | Individual couples | | | Semifinals | | Final |
|---|---|---|---|---|---|---|---|---|---|---|---|---|---|---|---|---|---|---|---|---|
| Pancho | Yellow | | | | | | IN | IN | LOW | IN | LOW | IN | LOW | LOW | OUT | | | — | IN | WINNER |
| Maite | Red | LOW | LOW | LOW | LOW | IN | LOW | IN | LOW | LOW | IN | IN | LOW | IN | IN | OUT | | — | IN | WINNER |
| Federico | Yellow | | LOW | IN | LOW | LOW | LOW | IN | IN | LOW | IN | OUT | | | | | | IN | — | OUT |
| Nash | Yellow | LOW | LOW | IN | LOW | LOW | LOW | IN | IN | LOW | IN | LOW | IN | IN | IN | IN | OUT | IN | — | OUT |
| Chapu | Red | IN | LOW | LOW | LOW | LOW | IN | IN | IN | LOW | LOW | LOW | IN | LOW | IN | IN | IN | — | OUT | |
| Eliana | Red | IN | IN | IN | LOW | OUT | | IN | IN | LOW | LOW | LOW | IN | LOW | IN | IN | IN | — | OUT | |
| Alfonso | Red | IN | IN | IN | IN | LOW | IN | IN | IN | IN | IN | IN | LOW | IN | IN | IN | IN | OUT | | |
| Catalina | Red | IN | LOW | LOW | IN | IN | LOW | LOW | IN | LOW | LOW | LOW | IN | IN | IN | IN | IN | OUT | | |
| Alain | Yellow | IN | IN | IN | IN | LOW | IN | LOW | LOW | IN | IN | IN | IN | LOW | IN | IN | OUT | | | |
| Philippe | Red | | | | | | | | LOW | LOW | IN | IN | LOW | IN | IN | OUT | | | | |
| Kathy C | Yellow | | | | LOW | IN | LOW | LOW | LOW | IN | LOW | IN | LOW | LOW | OUT | | | | | |
| Katherine B | Yellow | | | | | | IN | LOW | LOW | IN | IN | IN | IN | OUT | | | | | | |
| Laura | Yellow | IN | IN | IN | IN | LOW | IN | IN | IN | IN | IN | IN | OUT | | | | | | | |
| Alejandro | Red | IN | LOW | LOW | IN | IN | LOW | LOW | IN | LOW | OUT | | | | | | | | | |
| Ronny | Red | LOW | IN | LOW | LOW | IN | LOW | LOW | LOW | OUT | | | | | | | | | | |
| Daniel | Yellow | IN | IN | IN | LOW | LOW | LOW | LOW | IN | QUIT | | | | | | | | | | |
| Paz | Red | LOW | LOW | LOW | IN | IN | LOW | LOW | OUT | | | | | | | | | | | |
| Thiare | Red | IN | LOW | LOW | LOW | LOW | IN | QUIT | | | | | | | | | | | | |
| Felipe | Red | LOW | LOW | LOW | IN | IN | OUT | | | | | | | | | | | | | |
| Valeria | Yellow | IN | IN | IN | IN | LOW | QUIT | | | | | | | | | | | | | |
| Juan Carlos | Yellow | IN | IN | IN | OUT | | | | | | | | | | | | | | | |
| Valentina | Yellow | IN | IN | IN | QUIT | | | | | | | | | | | | | | | |
| Pedro | Red | LOW | OUT | | | | | | | | | | | | | | | | | |
| Francisco | Yellow | LOW | QUIT | | | | | | | | | | | | | | | | | |
| Sandra | Red | OUT | | | | | | | | | | | | | | | | | | |
