= Calle 7 season 5 =

Calle 7
- Season 5
- Starring: Martín Cárcamo; Jean Philippe Cretton; Valeria Ortega (on calle7.cl)

Release
- Original network: TVN
- Original release: November 15, 2010 – 2011

Season chronology
- ← Previous; Season 4 Next → Season 6

The season began on November 15, 2010, new participants were introduced as some of the known cast did not return. Like the third and fourth season the system of the competition was in mixed couples. This season, in addition to the award of six million Chilean pesos, the winning couple will get a zero km car. On December 30, 2010 Valeria Ortega left Calle 7 to join Canal 7 (Chile) being replaced by Alain Soulat on Internet.

== Contestants ==
Player	Eliminated
(Chile) Catalina Vallejos	Winners
(Chile) Philippe Trillat	Winners
(Chile) Karen Paola	2nd Place
(Ecuador) Juan Carlos "JC" Palma	2nd Place
(Chile) Fernanda Gallardo	11th Eliminated
(Uruguay) Juan Pedro Verdier	11th Eliminated
(Chile) Camila Nash	10th Eliminated
(Chile) Juan Pablo Alfonso	10th Eliminated
(Uruguay) Tamara Primus	9th Eliminated
(Chile) El enmascarado	9th Eliminated
(Argentina) Eliana Albasetti	8th Eliminated
(Chile) Felipe Camus	8th Eliminated
(Chile) María José Andrade	7th Eliminated
(Chile) Camila Andrade	6th Eliminated
(Chile) José Ignacio Valenzuela	5th Eliminated
(Chile) Glen "Chirimoya" Vega	4th Eliminated
(Chile) Katherina Contreras	3rd Eliminated
(Spain) Nidyan Fabregat	2nd Eliminated
(Chile) Juan Pablo Alfonso	1st Eliminated ^{[a]}
(Chile) Francisco "Pancho" Rodríguez	Quit
(Haiti) Pierre Desarmes	Quit ^{[b]}

^{^[a] Juan Pablo Alfonso returns to competition due to Juan Pedro Verdier injury.}

^{^[b] Juan Pedro Verdier returns to competition due to Pierre Desarmes injury.}

== Teams competition ==
Week	1st Nominated	2nd Nominated	3rd Nominated	4th Nominated	Extra Nominated	Saved	Winner	Eliminated
November 15–19	—	Camila A. and Juan Pedro	Eliana and Felipe	Katherina and Juan Pablo	—	—	Eliana and Felipe	—
November 22–26	Eliana and Felipe	Camila A. and Juan Pedro	Nidyan and Pierre	Katherina and Juan Pablo	—	Eliana and Felipe	Camila A. and Juan Pedro	Juan Pablo Alfonso
November 29 — December 3	Camila A. and Juan Pedro	Eliana and Felipe	Nidyan and Pierre	Katherina Contreras	—	Camila A. and Juan Pedro	Katherina Contreras	Nidyan Fabregat
December 6 — 10	Camila A. and Juan Pablo	Eliana and Felipe	Katherina and Glen	Karen and JC	—	Karen and JC	Eliana and Felipe; Camila .A and Juan Pablo	Katherina Contreras
December 13 — 17	Maria José and Pierre	Fernanda and José Ignacio	Catalina and Philippe	Glen Vega	—	Catalina and Philippe	Maria José and Pierre	Glen Vega
December 20 — 24	Maria José and Juan Pedro	Fernanda and José Ignacio	Tamara and El Emascarado	Camila . A and Juan Pablo	—	—	Maria José and Juan Pedro	José Ignacio Valenzuela
December 27 — 31	Maria José and Juan Pedro	Tamara and El Emascarado	Camila A. and Juan Pablo	—	—	—	Camila and Juan Pablo	—
January 3 — 7	Maria José and Juan Pedro	Tamara and El Emascarado	Camila .A and Juan Pablo	Eliana and Felipe	—	Eliana and Felipe	Tamara and El Emascarado; Maria José and Juan Pedro	Camila Andrade
January 3 — 7	Maria José and Juan Pedro	Tamara and El Emascarado	Eliana and Felipe	—	—	—	Eliana and Felipe	Maria José Andrade; Eliana and Felipe

== Elimination order ==
Contestants	Team	Weeks 1–11													Week 12	
Contestants	Team	1	2	3	4	5	6	7	8	9	Individual couples			Semifinals		Final
Philippe	Red	IN	IN	IN	IN	IN	LOW	IN	IN	IN	IN	IN	IN	IN	WIN	WINNER
Catalina	Red	IN	IN	IN	IN	IN	LOW	IN	IN	IN	IN	IN	IN	IN	WIN	WINNER
Juan Carlos	Red	IN	IN	IN	LOW	IN	IN	IN	IN	IN	IN	IN	IN	—	OUT	
Karen	Red	IN	IN	IN	LOW	IN	IN	IN	IN	IN	IN	IN	IN	—	OUT	
Fernanda	Yellow	IN	IN	IN	IN	LOW	LOW	IN	IN	IN	IN	IN	OUT	OUT		
Juan Pedro	Yellow	LOW	LOW	LOW			LOW	LOW	LOW	LOW	LOW	OUT	OUT			
El Emascarado	Yellow				IN	IN	LOW	LOW	LOW	LOW	OUT					
Tamara	Yellow						LOW	LOW	LOW	LOW	OUT	OUT				
Juan Pablo	Red	LOW	OUT		LOW	IN	LOW	LOW	LOW	OUT						
Nash	Red	IN	IN	IN	IN	IN	IN	IN	IN	IN	OUT					
Felipe	Yellow	LOW	LOW	LOW	LOW	IN	IN	IN	LOW	OUT						
Eliana	Yellow	LOW	LOW	LOW	LOW	IN	IN	IN	LOW	OUT						
Maria José	Yellow				IN	LOW	LOW	LOW	LOW	LOW	OUT					
Camila A.	Yellow	IN	LOW	LOW	LOW	LOW	IN	LOW	LOW	OUT						
José	Red	IN	IN	IN	IN	LOW	OUT									
Pancho	Red	IN	IN	IN	IN	QUIT										
Pierre	Yellow	LOW	LOW	IN	LOW	QUIT										
Glen	Yellow			IN	LOW	OUT										
Katherina	Yellow	LOW	LOW	LOW	OUT											
Nidyan	Yellow	In	LOW	LOW	OUT											
