= Circo de estrellas =

- Also known as: Star Circus
- Starring: Rafael Araneda; Karen Doggenweiler
- Country of origin: Chile
- No. of episodes: 10 episode (until now)

Production
- Production locations: TVN; Santiago, Chile
- Running time: 120 minutes 120 minutes (telecast)

Original release
- Network: TVN
- Release: March 25, 2010 – present

Circo de estrellas, is the Chilean adaptation of an Australian TV program Celebrity Circus broadcast by the Australian Nine Network. It is based on learning and performing circus skills. The Chilean version of the program was announced in a January 2010 press release, to be shown by Televisión Nacional de Chile on Thursdays at 22:40 hours, hosted by Rafael Araneda and Karen Doggenweiler. There is also a related special program called as'Circo behind the magic, which shows the trial participants in a kind of series-documentary.

The first episode, on 25 March 2010, attracted a rating of 16.2 points.

== Mechanical ==
The celebrities who enter the program begin their studies at least a month before the airing of the program. They are assigned a professional teacher for the disciplines covered by the circus, who will be with them throughout the competition. They are observed and evaluated by five judges who give their opinion and score for each of the duelists. The contestant with fewest votes leaves the competition.

== Judges ==
- Fernando Sánchez: managerial of the Brothers Fuentes Gazca Company
- Cristina Tocco: actress and singer
- Gustavo Sánchez: former judge of Latin American Idol
- Luz Croxatto: actress and screenwriter
- René O'Ryan: instructor of Pelotón III and Pelotón IV.

== Competition table ==
Participants	Age	Competition Status
Francisco "Chapu" Puelles - actor, contestant and double winner of Calle 7	25	1st Place
Janis Pope - audiovisual communicator, panelist of En Portada	25	2nd Place (4th eliminated)
Loreto Aravena - actress in Los 80 series	26	3rd Placed; 6th & 8th eliminated
Nabih Chadud - engineer, former contestant in Pelotón and La Granja	33	1st, 5th & 10th eliminated
Monserrat Prats - actress	23	2nd & 9th eliminated
César Caillet - actor, lawyer	36	7th eliminated
Mariela Montero - actress, model, singer, former participant in Pelotón	30	3rd eliminated
Carla Ballero - actress, model, TV host	30	Retired (4)
Maite Orsini (1)(3) - actress, model, contestant in Calle 7	22	Retired
Christian Ocaranza - dancer, former participant in Rojo Fama Contrafama	27	Retired (2)

(1) Alejandra Fosalba replaced due to leg injury by Maite Orsini.
(2) Christian Ocaranza replaced due to back injury by Nabih Chadud on 15 April.
(3) Maite Orsini replaced due to personal problems by Janis Pope.
(4) Carla Ballero retired because she was pregnant.

=== Table of elimination ===
Stars	Week 1	Week 2	Week 3	Week 4	Week 5	Week 6	Week 7	Week 8	Week 9	Semi-finals	Final part 1	Final part 2
Chapu	Save	Nominated	Nominated	Nominated	Save	Save	Nominated	Save	1st Semi-finalist	Save	1st Finalist	1st Place
Janis	Nominated	Save	Save	Save	Eliminated	Save	Save	Save	3rd Semi-finalist	Save	2nd Finalist	2nd Place
Loreto	Nominated	Save	Save	Save	Save	Nominated	Back In	Nominated	Eliminated	Back In	3rd finalist	3rd Placed
Nabih	Save	Eliminated		Back In	Save	Eliminated	Back In	Save	4th Semi-finalist	Save	Eliminated	
Carla	Nominated	Save	Save	Save	Injured	Save	Save	Save	2nd Semi-finalist	Retired		
Montserrat	Save	Nominated	Eliminated				Back In	Nominated	Nominated	Eliminated		
César	Save	Nominated	Nominated	Nominated	Nominated	Nominated	Save	Eliminated				
Maite	Nominated	Nominated	Nominated	Save	Save	Retired						
Mariela	Nominated	Save	Save	Eliminated								
Christian	Save	Save	Save	Retired								

== Repechaje stage ==
On May 6, 2010, it was the stage of the Repechaje where the contestants go through a task "Cuerda Floja". On this task were:

Participant	Result
Monserrat Prats	Back In
Loreto Aravena	Back In
Nabih Chadud	Back In
Mariela Montero	Eliminated
Maite Orsini	Eliminated

== Curiosities ==
- Francisco "Chapu" Puelles is the only finalist who was never eliminated.
