= Cretton =

Cretton is a surname. Notable people with the surname include:

- Destin Daniel Cretton (born 1978), American film director, screenwriter, producer, and editor
- Eduardo Cretton (born 1995), Chilean lawyer
- Jean Philippe Cretton (born 1985), Chilean television presenter and journalist
