= Laura Prieto =

Uruguayan-born Chilean model, singer, actress, dancer and TV personality

- Born: María Laura Prieto Villella; November 21, 1985 (age 40); Montevideo, Uruguay
- Occupations: Model, singer, actress and dancer
- Children: Tabata

María Laura Prieto Villella (born November 21, 1985, in Montevideo, Uruguay) is an Uruguayan-born Chilean model, singer, actress, dancer and personality of the Chilean television. She currently lives in Santiago de Chile.

== Personal life ==
Prieto was born in Montevideo, Uruguay, and decided to move to Chile when she was 16 years old. She studied theater and has a daughter named Tabata, who was born when Prieto was 19 years old. Laura and Tabata's father separated shortly after the birth. Prieto says she was thirteen when she began her career due to the support of her brother, who died that year.

"My brother told me I had to be a model and took me to auditions. What he loved the most was that I was a model. I began at thirteen."

== Career ==
Prieto began her career when she was 13 years old, attending a modeling course and various castings. She came to television through El último pasajero as a model or flight attendant. She later arrived at the TV show Calle 7 on January 12, 2009, where she continued in 2010.

Prieto participated in the Calle 7 record produced by Rigeo in which she would sing two songs, one of them with Maite Orsini. In March 2010, Prieto took part in the campaign Chile helps Chile where she sang her song I'm your girl. She also starred in the mini-series Amores de Calle as Luciana. More late work at the TV show Yingo, in Chilevision channel.

She has developed a modeling career for the agency New Models; she also has over a hundred fashion shows, photo shoots and advertising campaigns. She also works as an event entertainer. In 2009, she was the main model in the music video "Lady", song of DJ Mendez. It was recorded in Stockholm, Sweden, and released by Via-X and TVN, during a stage of promotion of "Lady" in early November 2009.

In 2026, she participates in Canal 13's reality show Vecinos al Límite.

== Filmography ==
| Year | Programme | Role | Channel |
|---|---|---|---|
| 2006–2008 | El Ultimo Pasajero | | |
| 2009–2010 | Calle 7 | | |
| 2010 | Sin Verguenza | Occasional Conduction | |
| 2010–2013 | Yingo | | |
| 2010 | Amores de Calle | | |
| 2011 | Vampiras | Protagonist | |
| 2019 | Resistiré | | |
| 2026 | Vecinos al Límite | | |

== Discography ==
- I'm your baby (2009)
- I go crazy (duet with Maite Orsini) (2010)

== See also ==
- Contestants of Calle 7
- Valeria Ortega Schettino
- Francisco "Chapu" Puelles
- Maite Orsini
- Valentina Roth
