= Romina Parraguirre =

Chilean footballer (born 1990)

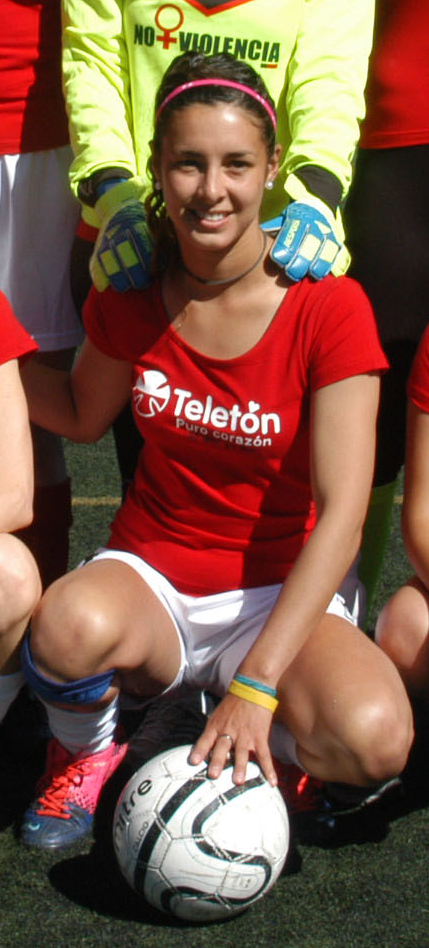
- Parraguirre at Teletón in 2012

Personal information
- Full name: Romina Paz Parraguirre Plaza
- Date of birth: 22 September 1990 (age 36)
- Place of birth: Santiago, Chile
- Height: 1.67 m (5 ft 6 in)
- Position: Goalkeeper

Senior career*
Years	Team	Apps	(Gls)
2005–2007	Universidad de Chile		
2008–2010	Colo-Colo		
2012–2015	Santiago Morning		
2015–2017	Colo-Colo		
2017–2018	NWS Koalas		
2020	Colo-Colo		
2022–2024	Gladesville Ravens	26	(0)
2025	Sydney Olympic	0	(0)

International career
2006–2014	Chile	4	(0)
2008–2010	Chile U20		
2011–2015	Chile (futsal)		
Medal record
Women's football
Representing Chile
South American Games
Silver medal – second place	2014 Santiago	Team
- * Club domestic league appearances and goals

Romina Paz Parraguirre Plaza (born 22 September 1990) is a Chilean former footballer who played as a goalkeeper. She was a member of the Chile women's national team.

== Club career ==
Parraguirre left Colo-Colo at the end of the 2020 season. In 2022, she moved to Australia and joined Gladesville Ravens.

In January 2025, she signed with Sydney Olympic.

After suffering a serious ACL injury, she announced her retirement on 18 December 2025.

== International career ==
Parraguirre was a non-playing squad member for Chile at the 2008 FIFA U-20 Women's World Cup. She capped at senior level during the 2006 South American Women's Football Championship. She also was a member of the Chile squad that won the silver medal at the 2014 South American Games.

Parraguirre also represented the Chile national futsal team in the Copa América de Futsal Femenina in 2011 and 2015.

== Coaching career ==
She has performed as football coach for youth players of Gladesville Ravens. She also started a goalkeeping academy for women.

== Post-retirement ==
Parraguirre graduated as a PE teacher. She also has worked as operations manager for a hearing aid company.

== Honours ==
Chile

- South American Games Silver medal: 2014

Colo-Colo

- Primera División: 2010
- Copa de Campeonas: 2015
- Copa Libertadores Femenina runner-up: 2015, 2017

Gladesville Ravens

- FNSW League One Women's: 2022
- FNSW League One Women's Premiers: 2022

Individual

- CPD - Best Women's Footballer: 2007
- FNSW League One Women's - Best Goalkeeper: 2022
- NPL NSW Women's Best Goalkeeper: 2023
- NPL NSW Women's Team of the Year: 2023

== Other media ==
Parraguirre has participated in Chilean reality television series Pelotón and Calle 7. She was runner-up in the fifth season of the former and has won the sixth and eighth editions of the latter.

After leaving Colo-Colo, she performed as a football commentator for CDF.
