= Calle 7 season 9 =

The ninth season of Calle 7, a Chilean reality program, began on April 2, 2012, new contestants were introduced and some former participants returned. The teams, yellow and red, were divided into new and old contestants, respectively. Juan Carlos Palma and Federico Koch, known contestants who had previously left the competition, joined the yellow team (the new participants' team). Fernanda Gallardo, who competed in seasons five and six, joined the red team (the known contestants' team). Like the first two seasons, the system of the competition is individual. After a decline in the show's ratings, the show returned to achieve a stable audience this season.

== Contestants ==
Contestants	Eliminated
(Argentina) Federico Koch	Winner (Men's Final)
(Chile) Fernanda Gallardo	Winner (Women's Final)
(Ecuador) Juan Carlos Palma	Runner-up (Men's Final)
(Chile) Jocelyn Medina	Runner-up (Women's Final)
(United Kingdom) Charlie Bick	19th eliminated and semifinalist
(Chile) Nicole Ugarte	18th eliminated and semifinalist
(Brazil) Rogerio de Farías	17th eliminated
(Chile) Muriel Martin	2nd and 16th eliminated
(Chile) Felipe Camus	6th and 15th eliminated
(Chile) Fernanda Acevedo	14th eliminated
(Chile) Matías Gil	13th eliminated
(Chile) Katherina Contreras	7th and 12th eliminated
(Chile) Claudio Valdivia	11th eliminated
(Peru) Lucía Covarrubias	10th eliminated
(Chile) José Ignacio Valenzuela	5th and 9th eliminated
(Chile) Jacqueline Gaete	8th eliminated
(Chile) Dominique Lattimore	4th eliminated
(Chile) Ronny "Dance" Munizaga	3rd eliminated
(Argentina) Sandra Bustamante	Quit
(Chile) José Luis "Junior Playboy" Concha	1st eliminated

== Teams Competition ==
Week	1st Nominated	2nd Nominated	3rd Nominated	4th Nominated	Saved	Winner	Eliminated
April 2 — 5	Dominique Lattimore	Lucía Covarrubias	Muriel Martín	Sandra Bustamante	Muriel Martín; Lucía Covarrubias	Sandra Bustamante	Not Eliminated
April 9 — 13	José Luis Concha	Federico Koch	Charlie Bick	José Ignacio Valenzuela	Charlie Bick; José Ignacio Valenzuela	Federico Koch	José Luis Concha
April 16 — 20	Muriel Martín	Nicole Ugarte	Jocelyn Medina	Fernanda Acevedo	Jocelyn Medina; Fernanda Acevedo	Nicole Ugarte	Muriel Martín
April 23 - 17	Matías Gil	Charlie Bick	Juan Carlos Palma	Ronny Munizaga	Juan Carlos Palma; Matías Gil	Charlie Bick	Ronny Munizaga
April 30 — May 5	Lucía Covarrubias	Katherina Contreras	Dominique Lattimore	Jocelyn Medina	Jocelyn Medina; Katherina Contreras	Lucía Covarrubias	Dominique Lattimore
May 7 — 11	José Ignacio Valenzuela	Federico Koch	Claudio Valdivia	Rogerio de Farías	Federico Koch; Claudio Valdivia	Rogerio de Farías	José Ignacio Valenzuela
May 14 — 18	Lucía Covarrubias	Jocelyn Medina	Nicole Ugarte	Felipe Camus	Jocelyn Medina; Nicole Ugarte	Lucía Covarrubias	Felipe Camus
May 21–25	Katherina Contreras	Jacqueline Gaete	Jocelyn Medina	Nicole Ugarte	Nicole Ugarte; Jacqueline Gaete	Jocelyn Medina	Katherina Contreras
May 28 - June 1	José Ignacio Valenzuela	Matías Gil	Juan Carlos Palma	Jacqueline Gaete	José Ignacio Valenzuela; Juan Carlos Palma	Matías Gil	Jacqueline Gaete
June 4–8	Rogerio de Farías	José Ignacio Valenzuela	Charlie Bick	Claudio Valdivia	Rogerio de Farías; Charlie Bick	Claudio Valdivia	José Ignacio Valenzuela
June 11 — 15	Muriel Martín	Jocelyn Medina	Nicole Ugarte	Lucía Covarrubias	Nicole Ugarte; Muriel Martín	Jocelyn Medina	Lucía Covarrubias
June 18 — 22	Rogerio de Farías	Claudio Valdivia	Matías Gil	Charlie Bick	Rogerio de Farías; Charlie Bick	Matías Gil	Claudio Valdivia
June 25 — 29	Katherina Contreras	Matías Gil	Fernanda Acevedo	Federico Koch	Not Saved	Fernanda Acevedo; Federico Koch	Katherina Contreras; Matías Gil
July 2 — 6	Fernanda Acevedo	Muriel Martín	Juan Carlos Palma	Felipe Camus	Not Saved	Muriel Martín; Juan Carlos Palma	Fernanda Acevedo; Felipe Camus

== Elimination order ==
Contestants	Team	Weeks														Week 15 (Final)		
Contestants	Team	1	2	3	4	5	6	7	8	9	10	11	12	13	14	Indiv	Semi	Final
Federico	Yellow	IN	LOW	IN	IN	IN	LOW	IN	IN	IN	IN	IN	IN	LOW	IN	WIN	—	WINNER
Fernanda G	Red	IN	IN	IN	IN	IN	IN	IN	IN	IN	IN	IN	IN	IN	IN	IN	WIN	WINNER
Juan Carlos	Yellow	IN	IN	IN	LOW	IN	IN	IN	IN	LOW	IN	IN	IN	IN	LOW	IN	WIN	OUT
Jocelyn	Red	IN	IN	LOW	IN	LOW	IN	LOW	LOW	IN	IN	LOW	IN	IN	IN	WIN	—	OUT
Charlie	Red	IN	LOW	IN	LOW	IN	IN	IN	IN	IN	LOW	IN	LOW	IN	IN	OUT	OUT	
Nicole	Red	IN	IN	LOW	IN	IN	IN	LOW	LOW	IN	IN	LOW	IN	IN	IN	OUT	OUT	
Rogerio	Yellow	IN	IN	IN	IN	IN	LOW	QUIT		IN	LOW	IN	LOW	IN	IN	OUT		
Muriel	Red	LOW	IN	OUT						IN	IN	LOW	IN	IN	LOW	OUT		
Felipe	Red	IN	IN	IN	IN	IN	IN	OUT		IN	IN	IN	IN	IN	OUT			
Fernanda A	Yellow	IN	IN	LOW	IN	IN	IN	IN	IN	IN	IN	IN	IN	LOW	OUT			
Matías	Red	IN	IN	IN	LOW	IN	IN	IN	IN	LOW	IN	IN	LOW	OUT				
Kathy	Red	IN	IN	IN	IN	LOW	IN	IN	OUT	IN	IN	IN	IN	OUT				
Claudio	Red	IN	IN	IN	IN	IN	LOW	IN	IN	IN	LOW	IN	OUT					
Lucía	Yellow	LOW	IN	IN	IN	LOW	IN	LOW	IN	IN	IN	OUT						
José	Yellow	IN	LOW	IN	IN	IN	OUT	IN	IN	LOW	OUT							
Jacqueline	Yellow	IN	IN	IN	IN	IN	IN	IN	LOW	OUT								
Dominique	Yellow	LOW	IN	IN	IN	OUT												
Ronny	Red	IN	IN	IN	OUT													
Sandra	Yellow	LOW	IN	IN	QUIT													
Junior	Yellow	IN	OUT															
