= Mariela Montero =

Argentinian model, actress, singer and media celebrity figure

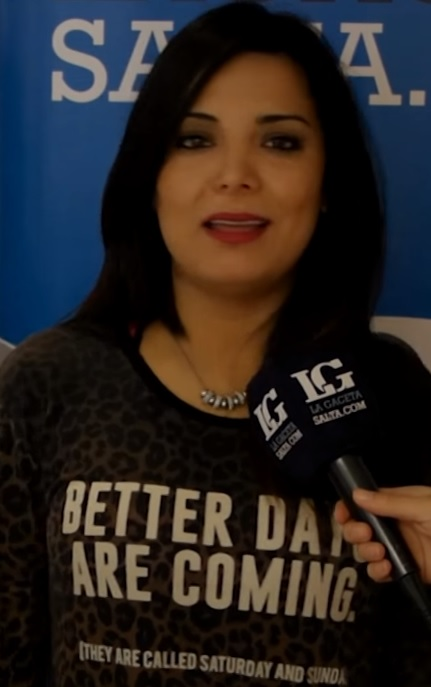
- Montero in 2016
- Born: Mariela Rosana Montero Ríos; 27 September 1980 (age 45); Buenos Aires, Argentina
- Occupations: Model; actress; singer
- Years active: 2007–present

Mariela Rosana Montero Ríos (born September 27, 1980) is an Argentinian model, actress, singer and media celebrity figure. She became known for her participation in the Argentinian reality television show Gran Hermano 2007; and for the Chilean reality show Pelotón VIP in 2009.

== Biography ==
Mariela Montero was born in Salta, Argentina. She is the daughter of José Montero and Marta Ríos. She began to sing as a result of her father belonging to a folklore music group. During her teenage years she studied for five years in theatre workshops. She studied theatre teaching and visual arts in Salta.

Since 2009, after participating in the Chilean reality show Pelotón VIP, Montero has resided in Chile and is in a relationship with a Chilean named Rodrigo Roa, an architect of Concepción.

== Career ==
Before entering the house of Gran Hermano, Montero lived for a few years in the United States, where she studied English and acting and appeared in several telenovelas. She later moved to Italy, where she continued to study theatre and develop her taste for music.

On her return to Salta, Montero worked as a promoter and resumed acting classes with the teacher and theatre director Jorge Renoldi. She began to act in several plays with the theatre director Rafael Monti.

She rose to fame in 2007 for her participation in Gran Hermano 2007, where she was a finalist thanks to her low profile and her well defined character. Montero was eventually placed third, with 923,628 votes.

In September 2008, a band called Semilla Explosiva composed for her the song "Chica Clandestina" (Clandestine Girl). In November 2008 she released her first music album.

In 2009, She became known in Chile after she participated in the reality show of Televisión Nacional de Chile Pelotón VIP, in which all participants were subjected daily to strict military training. Thanks to her personality and good performance, she managed to win the hearts of viewers and thus become one of the favourites. During the same year she officially launched her music album in Chile in a bar, accompanied by her boyfriend Rodrigo Roa. During the album launch she said:

I always wanted to sing. I found myself and I did. In fact it's me who wrote the songs

Montero was then invited to participate in the Televisión Nacional de Chile programmes Animal Nocturno and Buenos Días a Todos; and Chilevisión's Primer Plano and Teatro en Chilevisión. She was a panelist of entertainment and showbusiness programme of Intrusos en la Televisión on La Red and in February 2010 was a candidate to be named Queen of the Festival of Viña del Mar.

In late September 2011, Montero returned to Argentina after she was contacted by Telefe to participate as a panelist in the debates of Gran Hermano 2012.

On June 18, 2012, she joined the panel of the La Red television programme Así Somos in Chile.

== Television ==
- Gran Hermano 2007 Telefe - Argentina, 2007
- AM Telefe - Argentina, 2007–2008
- Intrusos en el Espectáculo América TV - Argentina, 2008
- Kubik América TV - Argentina, 2008
- Este es el Show El Trece - Argentina, 2008
- Don Francisco Presenta Univisión - United States, 2008
- Infama América TV - Argentina, 2009
- Pelotón VIP Televisión Nacional de Chile - Chile, 2009
- Animal nocturno Televisión Nacional de Chile - Chile, 2009
- Primer Plano Chilevisión - Chile, 2009
- Fiebre de baile 2 Chilevisión - Chile, 2009
- Combate estelar Televisión Nacional de Chile - Chile, 2009
- Teatro en Chilevisión Chilevisión - Chile, 2009–2010
- Intrusos en la televisión La Red - Chile, 2010
- Circo de estrellas (Chile) Televisión Nacional de Chile - Chile, 2010
- Gran Hermano 2012 Telefe - Argentina, 2011–2012
- Así Somos La Red - Chile, 2012
- Bienvenidos Canal 13 - Chile, 2012
- Mundos Opuestos 2 Canal 13 - Chile, 2013
- Ruleta Rusa Canal 13 - Chile, 2013
- En Portada UCV Televisión - Chile, 2013
- Juga2 Televisión Nacional de Chile - Chile, 2013

== Music ==
- 2008: Primer disco "100x100to yo!"
1. "Chau". (Lucas M. Sanchez, Mariela Montero, Drieta D., Guevara A. y Olivieri Andress)
2. "Estrellita Mía" (cover mexicano).
3. "Gracias". (Lucas M. Sanchez, Mariela Montero, Drieta D., Guevara A. y Olivieri Andress)
4. "Hoy". (Lucas M. Sanchez, Mariela Montero, Drieta D., Guevara A. y Olivieri Andress)
5. "Escucha mi voz".
