= Karen Doggenweiler =

Journalist and television presenter from Chile

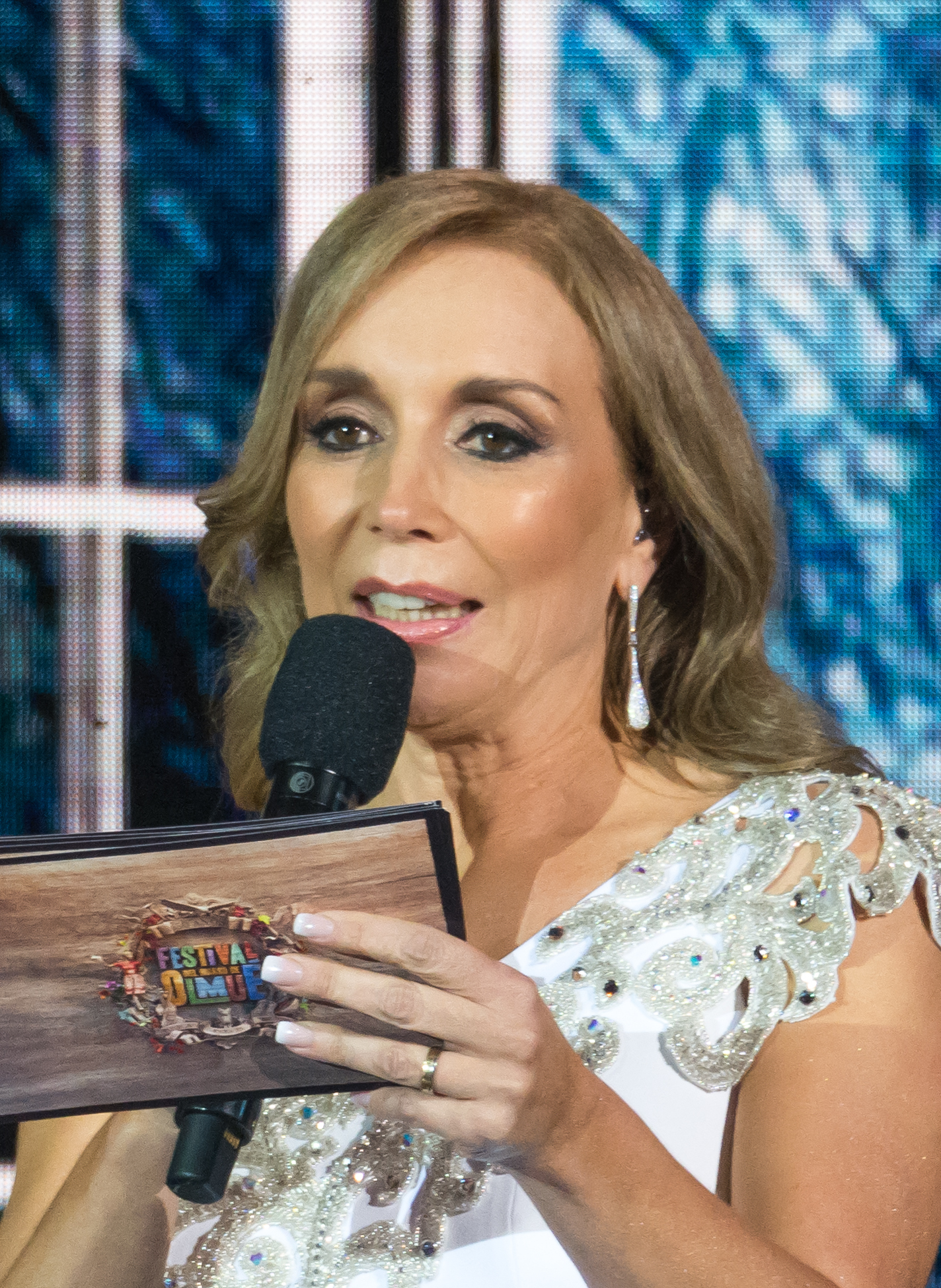
- Doggenweiler in 2019
- Born: Karen Doggenweiler Lapuente; 27 August 1969 (age 57); Santiago, Chile
- Education: Scuola Italiana Vittorio Montiglio; Gabriela Mistral University
- Occupations: Journalist, TV presenter
- Political party: Progressive Party

Karen Sylvia Doggenweiler Lapuente (27 August 1969) is a Chilean journalist and TV presenter.

== Biography ==
Doggenweiler is the daughter of Félix Doggenweiler Heim, of Swiss-German descent and Silvia Lapuente, of Spanish-Aragonese descent. She is married to the Chilean politician Marco Enríquez-Ominami. The marriage produced a child named Manuela. Karen started her TV career as the hostess of a morning show alongside Felipe Camiroaga in Televisión Nacional de Chile.

In 2007, Doggenweiler hosted the show El Baile en TVN with Rafael Araneda. On January 2, 2008, Félix Doggenweiler, Karen's father, died due to cancer. Days after, she started a new TV show, La Familia del Último Pasajero and Estrellas en el Hielo to later participate in the comedy film Mansacue. In the summer of 2009, Karen Doggenweiler hosted Calle 7 with Martín Cárcamo and Todos a Coro. At the time, she co-hosted the reality show Pelotón III with Rafael Araneda on TVN.

== Filmography ==
=== TV shows ===
TVN

- 24 Horas (1991–1995)
- NBA JAM deportivo (1997)
- Pase lo que Pase (1998–2001)
- Super Salvaje (animales) (2000)
- La Gran Sorpresa (2002)
- Tocando las Estrellas (2003)
- Buenos días a todos (2002–2004, 2011-2016)
- Chile Elige (2006)
- El Baile en TVN (2006–2008)
- Viña Tiene Festival (2008)
- La Familia del Último Pasajero (2008)
- Estrellas en el hielo: El baile (2008)
- Calle 7 (2009)
- Todos a Coro (2009)
- Pelotón III (2009)
- Abre los Ojos (2009-2010)
- Fuerza Chile (2010)
- Circo de Estrellas (2010)
- Circo, Detrás de la Magia (2010)
- Halcón y Camaleón (2010)
- Pelotón V (2010)
- Animal Nocturno (2010-2011)
- Mamá a los 15 (2011-)
- Factor X (2011-)
- Dime por qué? (2011)
- La dieta del Lagarto (2011)
