= Calle 7 season 10 =

The tenth season of Calle 7 began on July 23, 2012, new contestants were introduced and some former participants returned.

== Contestants ==
Contestants	Eliminated
(Argentina) Federico Koch	Winner (Men's Final)
(Chile) Fernanda Gallardo	Winner (Women's Final)
(United Kingdom) Charlie Bick	Runner-up (Men's Final)
(Chile) Jocelyn Medina	Runner-up (Women's Final)
(Chile) André Etchevers	Semifinalist (3rd) (Men's Semifinal)
(Chile) Nicole Ugarte	Semifinalist (3rd) (Women's Semifinal)
(Argentina) Federico Koch	20th eliminated
(Chile) Nicole Ugarte	19th eliminated
(Chile) Felipe Camus	18th eliminated
(Chile) Fernanda Acevedo	17th eliminated
(Peru) Jean Paul Santa Maria	16th eliminated
(Peru) Lucía Covarrubias	15th eliminated
(Ecuador) Juan Carlos Palma	Quit
(Chile) Matías Gil	14th eliminated
(Chile) Camila Nash	13th eliminated
(Argentina) Bruno Coleoni	12th Eliminated
(Chile) Katherina Contreras	11th Eliminated
(Chile) Felipe Camus	10th Eliminated
(Argentina) Cindy Coleoni	9th Eliminated
(Brazil) Rogerio de Farías	8th Eliminated
(Chile) Jacqueline Gaete	7th Eliminated
(Venezuela) Damián Suárez	Quit
(Chile) Susana Salinas	6th Eliminated
(Chile) Dominique Lattimore	5th Eliminated
(Chile) Ronny "Dance" Munizaga	4th Eliminated
(Chile) Fernanda Gallardo	Quit
(Chile) Katherina Contreras	3rd Eliminated
(United States) Justin Page	2nd Eliminated
(Chile) Nicole Ugarte	1st Eliminated

Notes
The contestant returned to the game.

== Elimination order ==
Contestants	Team	Weeks															
Contestants	Team	1	2	3	4	5	6	7	8	9	10	11	12	13	Indiv	SF	F
Federico	Red	LOW	IN	IN	IN	IN	IN	IN	LOW	IN	IN	IN	IN	IN	OUT	WIN	WINNER
Fernanda G	Yellow	LOW	LOW	IN	QUIT						IN	IN	LOW	IN	WIN	—	WINNER
Jocelyn	Yellow	IN	LOW	IN	LOW	IN	LOW	IN	LOW	IN	IN	IN	IN	IN	IN	WIN	OUT
Charlie	Yellow						IN	IN	IN	IN	LOW	LOW	IN	LOW	WIN	—	OUT
André	Red								IN	IN	IN	IN	LOW	IN	IN	OUT	
Nicole	Red	IN	OUT				IN	LOW	IN	IN	IN	IN	IN	LOW	OUT	OUT	
Felipe	Yellow	IN	IN	IN	IN	IN	IN	IN	IN	IN	OUT			IN	OUT		
Fernanda A	Red	LOW	IN	IN	IN	IN	IN	IN	IN	IN	IN	LOW	IN	IN	OUT		
Jean Paul	Yellow										IN	IN	IN	OUT			
Lucía	Red	IN	IN	IN	IN	IN	IN	IN	IN	IN	LOW	IN	IN	OUT			
Juan Carlos	Yellow	IN	IN	LOW	IN	LOW	IN	IN	IN	IN	IN	IN	IN	QUIT			
Matías	Red	LOW	IN	IN	IN	IN	IN	IN	IN	IN	IN	IN	OUT				
Camila	Yellow	IN	IN	IN	LOW	IN	LOW	LOW	IN	IN	IN	IN	OUT				
Bruno	Yellow	IN	IN	LOW	IN	IN	IN	IN	IN	IN	IN	OUT					
Kathy	Red	IN	IN	IN	OUT		IN	IN	IN	IN	IN	OUT					
Cindy	Yellow							IN	IN	IN	OUT						
Rogerio	Yellow	IN	IN	IN	IN	LOW	IN	IN	OUT								
Jacqueline	Red	IN	IN	IN	LOW	IN	IN	LOW	OUT								
Damián	Red	IN	IN	LOW	IN	LOW	IN	IN	QUIT								
Susana	Red	IN	IN	IN	IN	IN	LOW	OUT									
Dominique	Yellow	IN	LOW	IN	IN	IN	OUT										
Ronny	Red	IN	IN	IN	IN	OUT											
Justin	Red	IN	IN	OUT													
