= Calle 7 season 11 =

The eleventh season of Calle 7 began on November 5, 2012, new contestants were introduced as some former participants left the show.

== Contestants ==
Contestants	Eliminated
(Chile) Felipe Camus	Winner (Men's Final)
(Chile) Danae Vergara	Winner (Women's Final)
(United Kingdom) Charlie Bick	Runner-up (Men's Final)
(Chile) Catalina Vallejos	Runner-up (Women's Final)
(Argentina) Federico Koch	Semifinalist (3rd) (Men's Semifinal)
(Chile) Camila Nash	Semifinalist (3rd) (Women's Semifinal)
(Chile) Jacqueline Gaete	20th Eliminated
(Chile) Felipe Camus	19th Eliminated
(Argentina) Bruno Coleoni	18th Eliminated
(Chile) Camila Nash	17th Eliminated
(Chile) Matias Gil	16th Eliminated
(Chile) Camila Andrade	15th Eliminated
(Chile) Juan Pablo Alfonso	14th Eliminated
(Chile) Lia Lippi	13th Eliminated
(Chile) Esteban Vielmas	12th Eliminated
(Chile) Fernanda Gallardo	11th Eliminated
(Chile) Gabriel Pérez	10th Eliminated
(Chile) Camila Andrade	9th Eliminated
(Chile) Eliana Albasseti	8th Eliminated
(Argentina) Bruno Coleoni	7th Eliminated
(Chile) Katherina Contreras	6th Eliminated
(Chile) Víctor Martínez	5th Eliminated
(Chile) Paulina Riquelme	4th Eliminated
(Chile) Francisca Parra	Quit
(Argentina) Gabriel Martina	Quit
(Chile) Esteban Vielmas	3rd Eliminated
(Chile) Danae Vergara	2nd Eliminated
(Chile) Katherina Contreras	Quit
(Peru) Lucia Covarrubias	Quit
(Chile) Daniel Parraguez	Quit
(Chile) Paulina Riquelme	1st Eliminated
(Peru) Jean Paul Santa María	Quit
(Chile) Fernanda Acevedo	Quit

== Teams competition ==
Week	1st Nominated	2nd Nominated	3rd Nominated	4th Nominated	Extra nominated	Saved	Win	Eliminated
November 5— 12	Lucía Covarrubias	Daniel Parraguez	—	—	—	—	—	—
November 12— 19	Katherina Contreras	Jacqueline Gaete	Lia Lippi	Danae Vergara	Paulina Riquelme	Katherina Contreras; Jacqueline Gaete; Danae Vergara	Lía Lippi	Paulina Riquelme
November 20— 26	Katherina Contreras	Catalina Vallejos	Camila Nash	Dánae Vergara	—	—	Camila Nash; Catalina Vallejos	Dánae Vergara
November 27— December 3	Esteban Vielmas	Charlie Bick	Víctor Martínez	Bruno Coleoni	—	Charlie Bick; Bruno Coleoni	Víctor Martínez	Esteban Vielmas
December 6—10	Camila Nash	Paulina Riquelme	Dánae Vergara	Lía Lippi	—	Camila Nash; Dánae Vergara	Lía Lippi	Paulina Riquelme
December 11—17	Felipe Camus	Federico Koch	Víctor Martínez	Juan Pablo Alfonso	—	Felipe Camus; Federico Koch	Juan Pablo Alfonso	Víctor Martínez
December 18—21	Jacqueline Gaete	Catalina Vallejos	Katherina Contreras	Camila Nash	—	Catalina Vallejos; Camila Nash	Jacqueline Gaete	Katherina Contreras
December 24—31	—	—	—	—	—	—	—	—
January 2—7	Matías Gil	Bruno Coleoni	Juan Pablo Alfonso	Gabriel Pérez	Charlie Bick	Matías Gil; Charlie Bick; Juan Pablo Alfonso	Gabriel Pérez	Bruno Coleoni
January 8—14	Camila Andrade	Camila Nash	Eliana Albasseti	Jacqueline Gaete	—	Camila Nash; Jacqueline Gaete	Camila Andrade	Eliana Albasseti
January 15—21	Gabriel Pérez	Camila Andrade	Juan Pablo Alfonso	Lia Lippi	—	—	Lía Lippi; Juan Pablo Alfonso	Camila Andrade; Gabriel Pérez
January 22—28	Fernanda Gallardo	Federico Koch	Esteban Vielmas	Camila Andrade	—	—	Camila Andrade; Federico Koch	Fernanda Gallardo; Esteban Vielmas
January 29—February 4	Camila Andrade	Juan Pablo Alfonso	Bruno Coleoni	Lía Lippi	—	—	Camila Andrade; Bruno Coleoni	Lía Lippi; Juan Pablo Alfonso
February 5—8	Dánae Vergara	Felipe Camus	Camila Andrade	Matías Gil	—	—	Dánae Vergara; Felipe Camus	Camila Andrade; Matías Gil

== Elimination order ==
Contestants	Team	Weeks														Week 15 (Final)		
Contestants	Team	1	2	3	4	5	6	7	8	9	10	11	12	13	14	Indiv	Semi	Final
Felipe	Red	IN	IN	IN	IN	IN	LOW	IN	IN	IN	IN	IN	IN	IN	LOW	OUT	WIN	WINNER
Danae	Yellow	IN	LOW	OUT	IN	LOW	IN	IN	IN	IN	IN	IN	IN	IN	LOW	IN	WIN	WINNER
Charlie	Yellow	IN	IN	IN	LOW	IN	IN	IN	IN	LOW	IN	IN	IN	IN	IN	WIN	—	OUT
Catalina	Yellow	IN	IN	LOW	IN	IN	IN	LOW	IN	IN	IN	IN	IN	IN	IN	WIN	—	OUT
Federico	Red	IN	IN	IN	IN	IN	LOW	IN	IN	IN	IN	IN	LOW	IN	IN	IN	OUT	
Camila N.	Red	IN	IN	LOW	IN	LOW	IN	LOW	IN	IN	LOW	IN	IN	IN	IN	OUT	OUT	
Jacqueline	Red	IN	LOW	IN	IN	IN	IN	LOW	IN	IN	LOW	IN	IN	IN	IN	OUT		
Bruno	Red	IN	IN	IN	LOW	IN	IN	IN	IN	OUT			IN	LOW	IN	OUT		
Matias	Yellow	IN	IN	IN	IN	IN	IN	IN	IN	LOW	IN	IN	IN	IN	OUT			
Camila A.	Red									IN	LOW	OUT	LOW	LOW	OUT			
Juan Pablo	Red					IN	LOW	IN	IN	LOW	IN	LOW	IN	OUT				
Lia	Yellow	IN	LOW	IN	IN	IN	LOW	IN	IN	IN	IN	LOW	IN	OUT				
Esteban	Yellow	IN	IN	IN	OUT			IN	IN	IN	IN	IN	OUT					
Fernanda G.	Yellow	IN	IN	IN	IN	IN	IN	IN	IN	IN	IN	IN	OUT					
Gabriel	Red					IN	IN	IN	IN	LOW	IN	OUT						
Eliana	Red				IN	IN	IN	IN	IN	IN	OUT							
Katherina	Red	IN	LOW	LOW				OUT										
Víctor	Yellow	IN	IN	IN	LOW	IN	OUT											
Paulina	Red	IN	OUT	IN	IN	OUT												
Francisca	Red	IN	IN	IN	QUIT													
Gabriel M.	Yellow	IN	IN	IN	QUIT													
Daniel	Red	LOW	QUIT															
Lucía	Red	LOW	QUIT															
Jean Paul	Red	QUIT																
Fernanda A.	Yellow	QUIT																
