= Calle 7 season 12 =

The twelfth season of the Chilean reality television show Calle 7 took place between March and May 2013. The winners were Fernanda Gallardo and Francisco Rodríguez.

== Contestants ==
Contestants	Eliminated
(Argentina) Bruno Coleoni	
(Chile) Carla Cáceres	
(Chile) Catalina Vallejos	
(United Kingdom) Charlie Bick	
(Argentina) Federico Koch	
(Chile) Fernanda Acevedo	
(Chile) Fernanda Gallardo	
(Chile) Lía Lippi	
(Chile) Stefano Ciaravino	
(Chile) Camila Nash	
(Chile) Francisco Rodríguez Prat	
(Chile) Juan Pablo Alfonso	
(Chile) Felipe Camus	11th Eliminated
(Argentina) Eliana Albasseti	10th Eliminated
(Chile) Gabriel Pérez	9th Eliminated
(Chile) Jacqueline Gaete	8th Eliminated
(Chile) Camila Nash	7th Eliminated
(Brazil) Juliano Mello	Quit
(Chile) Juan Pablo Alfonso	6th Eliminated
(Uruguay) Tamara Primus	5th Eliminated
(Chile) Gabriel Pérez	4th Eliminated
(Uruguay) Tamara Primus	3rd Eliminated
(Chile) Camila Andrade	Quit
(Chile) Paz Gómez	2nd Eliminated
(Chile) Matias Gil	1st Eliminated

== Teams competition ==
Week	1st Nominated	2nd Nominated	3rd Nominated	4th Nominated	Extra nominated	Saved	Win	Eliminated
March 4— 8	Paz Gómez	Camila Nash	Fernanda Gallardo	Jacqueline Gaete	—	Fernanda Gallardo; Camila Nash	Paz Gómez	—
March 11— 16	Francisco Rodriguez	Matias Gil	Juan Pablo Alfonso	Charlie Bick	—	Francisco Rodriguez; Charlie Bick	Juan Pablo Alfonso	Matias Gil
	Carla Caceres	Paz Gómez	Fernanda Gallardo	Jacqueline Gaete	Catalina Vallejos	Catalina Vallejos; Fernanda Gallardo; Jacqueline Gaete	Carla Caceres	Paz Gómez

== Elimination order ==
Contestants	Team	Weeks										
Contestants	Team	1	2	3	4	5	6	7	8	9	10	11
Bruno	Yellow	IN	IN	IN	IN	LOW	IN	LOW	IN	IN	LOW	IN
Camila N.	Red	LOW	IN	IN	LOW	IN	IN	IN	OUT	LOW	IN	IN
Carla	Yellow	IN	IN	LOW	IN	IN	LOW	IN	LOW	IN	LOW	IN
Catalina	Yellow	IN	IN	LOW	IN	IN	LOW	IN	IN	IN	IN	IN
Charlie	Yellow	IN	LOW	IN	IN	LOW	IN	LOW	IN	IN	IN	IN
Federico	Yellow	IN	IN	IN	IN	LOW	IN	LOW	IN	IN	IN	IN
Fernanda A.	Yellow	IN	IN	IN	LOW	IN	IN	IN	IN	IN	IN	IN
Fernanda . G	Red	LOW	IN	IN	IN	IN	IN	IN	LOW	IN	IN	LOW
Pancho	Red	IN	LOW	IN	IN	IN	IN	LOW	IN	LOW	IN	IN
Juan Pablo	Red	LOW	IN	IN	IN	IN	OUT		IN	IN	IN	IN
Lía	Yellow	IN	IN	IN	IN	IN	IN	IN	IN	IN	IN	LOW
Stefano	Yellow	IN	IN	IN	IN	IN	LOW	IN	IN	IN	IN	IN
Felipe	Red	IN	IN	IN	IN	IN	IN	IN	IN	IN	OUT	
Eliana	Red	IN	IN	IN	IN	IN	IN	IN	LOW	IN	OUT	
Gabriel	Red	IN	IN	IN	IN	OUT				OUT		
Jacqueline	Red	LOW	IN	LOW	LOW	IN	LOW	IN	IN	OUT		
Juliano	Red	IN	IN	IN	IN	IN	IN	IN	QUIT			
Tamara	Red		IN	IN	OUT	IN	OUT					
Camila A.	Yellow	IN	IN	IN	IN	QUIT						
Paz	Red	LOW	IN	OUT								
Matias	Red	IN	OUT									
Danae	Red	QUIT										
