= Paul Pablo =

Filipino singer and songwriter

- Born: Paul Ramirez
- Origin: Davao City, Philippines
- Genres: Pop; R&B; electropop; OPM
- Occupations: Singer; songwriter
- Years active: 2019–present
- Label: Warner Music Philippines

Paul Ramirez, also known as Paul Pablo, is a Filipino singer and songwriter from Davao City. He began releasing music independently before signing with Warner Music Philippines. His singles released include "Bangin" and "Kalawakan", followed by releases such as "Di Inakala", "Kaya", and "Atin Ang Gabi", mark the progression of his music career.

== Early life and education ==
Paul Ramirez was raised in Davao City. He developed an interest in music at a young age, singing along to songs by Whitney Houston, Celine Dion, Frank Sinatra, and Paul Anka through karaoke. At the age of 14, he came out as bakla to his family and friends. He later spoke about growing up in a conservative and religious environment, experiences that influenced his songwriting.

He studied Bachelor of Arts in Communications at Ateneo de Davao University and graduated in 2021.

== Career ==
Pablo first released music under his birth name Paul Ramirez, before adopting the stage name Paul Pablo. His debut single "Bai" released in 2020, led to him signing with Warner Music Philippines. "Bai" featured the Davao "conyo" way of speech which is a code-mixing of Tagalog, Bisayan and English.

In 2021, he released the singles "Bangin" which received streams on Spotify. Later that year, he released "Kalawakan", a song about self-belief and perseverance. He has said that these releases were part of his effort to highlight music from the Visayas and Mindanao regions.

In 2022, he released "Di Inakala" during Pride Month. He later released "Kaya", about the challenges faced by "adulting" stage after college. The music video for "Kaya" was released on March 22. It is described as crisp, detailed, and colorful, with the artist remaining actively involved in its production.

In 2023, he released the single "Sagi", in which Pablo sings to his lover with doubt but also with a clear choice to love, showing a love that understands and knows when to stay quiet, keeping the charm of his earlier songs.

In 2024, he released "Atin Ang Gabi", which has been described as a "vibrant power-pop anthem".

Pablo has performed at events such as the Plus63 Music Festival and won Best Cover Art at the Awit Awards in 2022 for "Kalawakan". He has expressed interest in collaborating with SB19 member Stell and the P-pop group ALAMAT.

== Artistry ==
Pablo describes his music as "hugot-tronic", style that combines sentimentalism. His sound incorporates electropop, indie pop, disco, synth-pop, and R&B influences. His songwriting often centres on themes of love, identity, and social tension.

He has cited Lady Gaga and Adam Lambert as major influences, and has also expressed admiration for SB19 and Zild Benitez of IV of Spades.

== Discography ==
=== Selected singles ===
- "Bai" (2020)
- "Bangin" (2021)
- "Kalawakan" (2021)
- "Gulo" (2021)
- "Di Inakala" (2022)
- "Kaya" (2022)
- "Sagi" (2023)
- "Hilo" (2024)
- "Atin Ang Gabi" (2024)
- "Halata" (2025)
