= Amor a Ciegas =

- Genre: Romance, Comedy
- Created by: Adriana Pelusi; Carlos Quintanilla
- Written by: Adriana Pelusi
- Directed by: Carlos Quintanilla
- Theme music composer: Carlos Romo
- Opening theme: Helga Chávez
- Country of origin: Mexico
- No. of seasons: 1

Production
- Producers: Ventaneando; Azteca CEFAT
- Cinematography: Gabriela Liévanos
- Running time: 5-6 minutes

Amor a Ciegas (stylized as #AMORACIEGAS) is a Mexican web series written by Adriana Pelusi and directed by Carlos Quintanilla. It premiered on azteca.com in March 2014, but has since aired after Ventaneando, on Wednesdays, at 4:00pm.

Amor a Ciegas is the first web series produced by Azteca CEFAT, Azteca's acting school.

== Episodes ==
No.	Title	Directed by	Written by	Original release date
1	"El amor de mi vida"	Carlos Quintanilla	Adriana Pelusi	5 March 2014
Starring Ariana Ron Pedrique (Ana), Israel Amescua (Pablo), Nahuel Escobar
2	"Espero que no te moleste"	Carlos Quintanilla	Adriana Pelusi	12 March 2014
Starring Edu del Prado (Hugo), Bárbara de Regil (Rebeca), Adrián Herrera (Santiago), Alexa de Regil (Marianita) and Carlos Marmen (Federico)
3	"No eres como te imaginaba"	Carlos Quintanilla	Adriana Pelusi	19 March 2014
Starring Ramiro Tomasini (Mateo), Stefany Hinojosa (Alicia)
4	"Odio las citas a ciegas"	Carlos Quintanilla	Adriana Pelusi	26 March 2014
Starring Carolina Miranda (Laura), Gabriel Rossi (Daniel)
5	"¿Por qué siempre piensas lo peor?"	Carlos Quintanilla	Adriana Pelusi	2 April 2014
Starring Adianez Hernández (Tania), Gregory Kauffmann (Gerardo), Paola Morales (Sara)
6	"Creo que es el hombre de mi vida"	Carlos Quintanilla	Adriana Pelusi	9 April 2014
Starring Giovanna Romo (Cecilia), Francisco Angelini (Juan Carlos), Carolina Miranda (Laura), Stefany Hinojosa (Alicia), Ramiro Tomasini (Mateo), Gabriel Rossi (Daniel)
7	"5 Minutos y ya"	Carlos Quintanilla	Adriana Pelusi	16 April 2014
Starring Cristian Wolf (Santiago), Esmeralda Ugalde (Carolina)
8	"Me gustaría ser como tú"	Carlos Quintanilla	Adriana Pelusi	23 April 2014
Starring Israel Amescua (Pablo), Luciano Zacharski (René)
