= Calle 7 season 6 =

The sixth season of Calle 7 was a Chilean television program, shown by TVN from Monday to Friday at 6 pm. It was last co-hosted by Jean Philippe Crettonand involved two teams of young adult contenders participating in unique challenges and performing arts to win a top prize at the end of the competition.

== Competition after ==
Week 1 (January 24–29)
Contestant	Condicion in the program
(Chile) André Etchevers; (Chile) Natalia Mandiola	Winners
(Chile) Mauricio Rojas; (Chile) Madeleinne Navarro	2° Place
(Chile) Jonathan Hurtado; (Chile) Natalia Provoste	3° Place; Semifinalist
(Chile) Patricio Muñoz; (Chile) Natalia Provoste	5° Eliminated
(Chile) Jonathan Hurtado; (Chile) Paola Torres	4º Eliminated
(Chile) Mauricio Hermosilla; (Chile) Nicole Hurtado	3° Eliminated
(Chile) Mauricio Rojas; (Chile) María Teresa Rubilar	2° Eliminated
(Chile) Rodrigo Ortega; (Chile) Claudia De la Cruz	1° Eliminated
(Chile) Francisco Damiano	Quit

Week 2 (January 31 - February 4)
Contestant	Condicion in the program
(Chile) Felipe Labrín; (Venezuela) Karina Larraín	Winners
(Chile) Sebastián Macaya; (Chile) Nicole Gómez	2° Place
(Chile) Eduardo Dasté; (Belgium) Xaviera Vleugels	3° Place; Semifinalist
(Chile) Diego Martínez; (Chile) Daniela Vargas	4° Eliminated
(Chile) Félix Toledo; (Chile) Belén Vilches	3° Eliminated
(Chile) David Cruz; (Germany) Sofía De la Parra	2° Eliminated
(Chile) Ramón Yáñez; (Chile) Rita Pino	1° Eliminated

Week 3 (feubrary 14-18)
Contestant	Condicion in the program
(Brazil) Horacio da Silva; (Chile) Maricarmen Malo	Winners
(Chile) Oliver Zalaquett; (Chile) Cassandra Valenzuela	2° Place
(Chile) Fabián Orellana; (Chile) Karin Herrera	3° Place; Semifinalist
(Chile) Felipe Arancibia; (Chile) Jesse Vásquez	4º Eliminated
(Chile) Cristóbal Pinochet; (Chile) Nicole Ugarte	3º Eliminated
(Chile) Rodrigo Rojas; (Chile) Camila Starikoff	2° Eliminated
(Chile) Matías Cobián; (Chile) Karin Herrera	1° Eliminated
(Chile) Dania Pavéz	Quit

Week 4 (feubrary 14-18)
Contestant	Condicion in the program
(Argentina) Daniel Aliaga; (Chile) Romina Parraguirre	Winners
(Chile) Felipe Matamala; (Chile) Nushiel Jeréz	2° Place
(Peru) Juan Carlos Galarza; (Belgium) Xaviera Vleugels	3° Place; Semifinalist
(Chile) Matías Espinoza; (Chile) María Paz Schmidt	4º Eliminated
(Chile) Erick Kleinsteuber; (Chile) Claudia Kaempfe	3° Eliminated
(Chile) Ian Vásquez; (Chile) Natalia Provoste	2° Eliminated
(Chile) Martín Olivos; (Chile) Christell Coopman	1° Eliminated

== Contestants ==
Contestants	Eliminated
(Ecuador) Juan Carlos Palma	Winner (Men's Final)
(Chile) Romina Parraguirre	Winner (Women's Final)
(Chile) Maximiliano Cruchaga	Runner-up (Men's Final)
(Uruguay) Tamara Primus	Runner-up (Women's Final)
(Chile) Felipe Camus	Semifinalist
(Chile) Romina Parraguirre	Semifinalist
(Argentina) Federico Koch	19th eliminated
(Argentina) Eliana Albasseti	19th eliminated
(Chile) Maximiliano Cruchaga	18th eliminated
(Chile) Natalia Mandiola	18th eliminated
(Chile) Camila Andrade	Quit
(Chile) Fernanda Gallardo	Quit
(Chile) El Emascarado	Quit
(Argentina) Eliana Albasseti	17th eliminated
(Argentina) Federico Koch	16th eliminated
(Chile) Juan Pablo Alfonso	15th eliminated
(Chile) Katherina Contreras	14th eliminated
(Argentina) Daniel Aliaga	13th eliminated
(Venezuela) Karina Larraín	12th eliminated
(Uruguay) Juan Pedro Verdier	Quit
(Chile) Romina Parraguirre	11th eliminated
(Chile) Andre Etchevers	10th eliminated
(Chile) Camila Nash	10th eliminated
(Chile) Felipe Camus	9th eliminated
(Chile) Fernanda Gallardo	9th eliminated
(Chile) José Ignacio Valenzuela	8th eliminated
(Chile) Cassandra Valenzuela	8th eliminated
(Chile) Felipe Labrín	Quit
(Chile) Nicole Gómez	Quit
(Chile) Karen Paola	Quit
(Chile) Jonathan Hurtado	Quit
(Chile) Nelson Mauricio Pacheco	Quit
(Chile) Felipe Camus	7th eliminated
(Chile) Maricarmen Malo	7th eliminated
(Venezuela) Horacio Da Silva	Quit
(Uruguay) Juan Pedro Verdier	6th Eliminated
(Chile) Philippe Trillat	Quit
(Chile) José Ignacio Valenzuela	5th Eliminated
(Chile) Natalia Mandiola	4th Eliminated
(Argentina) Mauricio Rojas	3rd Eliminated
(Argentina) Daniel Aliaga	2nd Eliminated
(Chile) El Enmascarado	1st Eliminated

== Competition table ==
Semana	1st Nominated	2nd Nominated	3rd Nominated	4th Nominated	Extra Nominated	Saved	Winners	Eliminated
28 feubrary - March 4	Nicole Gómez; Mauricio Rojas	Maricarmen Malo; Felipe Camus	Romina Parraguirre; Philippe Trillat	Tamara Primus; El Enmascarado	No Nominated	Romina Parraguirre	Not winner	Not Eliminated
March 7–11	Natalia Mandiola; Juan Pedro Verdier	Nicole Gómez; El Enmascarado	Katherina Contreras; Jonathan Hurtado	Romina Parraguirre; Juan Carlos Palma	Not Nominated	Romina Parraguirre; Jonathan Hurtado	Nicole Gómez; Juan Pedro Verdier	El Enmascarado
March 14–18	Natalia Mandiola; Felipe Camus	Nicole Gómez; Juan Pedro Verdier	Camila Nash; Mauricio Rojas	Tamara Primus; Daniel Aliaga	Not Nominated	Felipe Camus; Tamara Primus	Camila Nash; Mauricio Rojas	Daniel Aliaga
March 21–25	Eliana Albasetti; Philippe Trillat	Karina Larraín; Federico Koch	Katherina Contreras; Jonathan Hurtado	Camila Nash; Mauricio Rojas	Not Nominated	Camila Nash; Jonathan Hurtado	Karina Larraín; Federico Koch	Mauricio Rojas
March 28- April 1	Nicole Gómez; Felipe Camus	Fernanda Gallardo; Felipe Labrín	Karina Larraín; José Ignacio Valenzuela	Natalia Mandiola; Juan Pedro Verdier	Federico Koch	Fernanda Gallardo; Felipe Camus; José Ignacio Valenzuela	Karina Larraín; Felipe Labrín	Natalia Mandiola
April 4–8	Eliana Albasetti; Philippe Trillat	Maricarmen Malo; Juan Pedro Verdier	Karina Larraín; José Ignacio Valenzuela	Romina Parraguirre; Juan Pablo Alfonso	Not Nominated	Eliana Albasetti; Juan Pedro Verdier	Maricarmen Malo; Juan Pablo Alfonso	José Ignacio Valenzuela
April 11–15	Eliana Albasetti; Juan Pablo Alfonso	Tamara Primus; André Etchevers	Karina Larraín; Juan Carlos Palma	Maricarmen Malo; Juan Pedro Verdier	Not Nominated	Juan Carlos Palma; Maricarmen Malo	Karina Larraín; André Etchevers	Juan Pedro Verdier
April 18–22	Cassandra Valenzuela; José Ignacio Valenzuela	Karen Paola; Jonathan Hurtado	Maricarmen Malo; Felipe Camus	Nicole Gómez; Juan Pablo Alfonso	Not Nominated	Karen Paola; Jonathan Hurtado	Nicole Gómez; Juan Pablo Alfonso	Maricarmen Malo; Felipe Camus
April 25–29	Karina Larraín; José Ignacio Valenzuela	Romina Parraguirre; André Etchevers	Cassandra Valenzuela; Juan Carlos Palma	Katherina Contreras; Federico Koch	Not Nominated	Juan Carlos Palma; Katherina Contreras	Karina Larraín; Federico Koch	Cassandra Valenzuela; José Ignacio Valenzuela
May 2	Fernanda Gallardo; Felipe Camus	Camila Nash; André Etchevers	Not Nominated	Not Nominated	Not Nominated	Not Saved	Camila Nash; André Etchevers	Fernanda Gallardo; Felipe Camus
May 3–4	Juan Pablo Alfonso	André Etchevers	Camila Nash	Eliana Albasetti	Katherina Contreras	Katherina Contreras	Eliana Albasetti; Juan Pablo Alfonso	Camila Nash; André Etchevers
May 9–13	Juan Pablo Alfonso	Romina Parraguirre	Federico Koch	Eliana Albasetti	Not Nominated	Not Saved	Eliana Albasseti; Federico Koch	Romina Parraguirre
May 16–20	Juan Pablo Alfonso	Karina Larraín	Fernanda Gallardo	Juan Carlos Palma	Not Nominated	Not Saved	Fernanda Gallardo; Juan Carlos Palma	Karina Larraín
May 23–27	Natalia Mandiola	El Enmascarado	Fernanda Gallardo	Daniel Aliaga	Not Nominated	Not Saved	Fernanda Gallardo; El Emascarado	Daniel Aliaga
May 30-June 3	Fernanda Gallardo	Juan Carlos Palma	Felipe Camus	Katherina Contreras	Not Nominated	Not Saved	Fernanda Gallardo; Felipe Camus	Katherina Contreras
June 6–10	Juan Pablo Alfonso	Tamara Primus	Juan Carlos Palma	Natalia Mandiola	Not Nominated	Not Saved	Tamara Primus; Juan Carlos Palma	Juan Pablo Alfonso
June 13–17	Juan Carlos Palma	Natalia Mandiola	Fernanda Gallardo	Federico Koch	Not Nominated	Not Saved	Fernanda Gallardo; Juan Carlos Palma	Federico Koch
June 20–24	Natalia Mandiola	Maximiliano Cruchaga	Eliana Albasetti	Federico Koch	Not Nominated	Not Saved	Natalia Mandiola; Maximiliano Cruchaga	Eliana Albasetti
June 27- July 1	Eliana Albasetti	Federico Koch	Maximiliano Cruchaga	Natalia Mandiola	Not Nominated	Not Saved	Eliana Albasetti; Federico Koch	Natalia Mandiola; Maximiliano Cruchaga

== Elimination order ==
Contestants	Team	Weeks 1—19																			Week 20		
Contestants	Team	1	2	3	4	5	6	7	8	9	10	11	12	13	14	15	16	17	18	19	Individual	Semifinals	Final
JC	Red	IN	LOW	IN	IN	IN	IN	LOW	IN	LOW	IN	IN	IN	LOW	IN	LOW	LOW	LOW	IN	IN	IN	WIN	<span style="color:white;" | WINNER
Romina	Yellow	LOW	LOW	IN	IN	IN	LOW	IN	IN	LOW	IN	IN	OUT							IN	IN	OUT	<span style="color:white;" | WINNER
Max	Yellow																		LOW	OUT			OUT
Tamara	Red	LOW	IN	LOW	IN	IN	IN	LOW	IN	IN	IN	IN	IN	IN	IN	IN	LOW	IN	IN	IN	IN	WIN	OUT
Felipe.C	Yellow	LOW	IN	LOW	IN	LOW	IN	IN	OUT	IN	OUT		IN	IN	IN	LOW	IN	IN	IN	IN	IN	OUT	
Federico	Red	IN	IN	IN	LOW	LOW	IN	IN	IN	LOW	IN	IN	LOW	IN	IN	IN	IN	OUT	LOW	LOW	OUT		
Eliana	Yellow	IN	IN	IN	LOW	IN	LOW	LOW	IN	IN	IN	IN	LOW	IN	IN	IN	IN	IN	OUT	LOW	OUT		
Natalia	Red	IN	LOW	LOW	IN	OUT							IN	IN	IN	IN	LOW	LOW	LOW	OUT			
Camila .A	Yellow																			QUIT			
Fernanda	Yellow	IN	IN	IN	IN	LOW	IN	IN	IN	IN	OUT		IN	LOW	LOW	LOW	IN	LOW	QUIT				
Enmascarado	Yellow	LOW	OUT										IN	IN	LOW	IN	IN	IN	QUIT				
Juan Pablo	Red	IN	IN	IN	IN	IN	LOW	LOW	IN	IN	IN	LOW	LOW	LOW	IN	IN	OUT						
Kathy	Yellow	IN	LOW	IN	LOW	IN	IN	IN	IN	LOW	IN	LOW	IN	IN	IN	OUT							
Daniel	Yellow	IN	IN	OUT									IN	IN	OUT								
Karina	Yellow	IN	IN	IN	LOW	LOW	LOW	LOW	IN	LOW	IN	IN	IN	OUT									
Juan Pedro	Yellow	IN	LOW	IN	IN	LOW	LOW	OUT				LOW											
André	Yellow	IN	IN	IN	IN	IN	IN	LOW	IN	LOW	LOW	OUT											
Camila .N	Yellow	IN	IN	LOW	LOW	IN	IN	IN	IN	IN	LOW	OUT											
Cassandra	Red	IN	IN	IN	IN	IN	IN	IN	LOW	OUT													
José	Red	IN	IN	IN	IN	LOW	OUT	IN	LOW	OUT													
Karen	Red	IN	IN	IN	IN	IN	IN	IN	LOW	QUIT													
Felipe .L	Yellow	IN	IN	IN	IN	LOW	IN	IN	IN	QUIT													
Nelson	Yellow							IN	IN	QUIT													
Jonathan	Red	IN	LOW	IN	LOW	IN	IN	IN	LOW	QUIT													
Nicole	Yellow	LOW	LOW	LOW	IN	LOW	IN	IN	LOW	QUIT													
Maricarmen	Yellow	LOW	IN	IN	IN	IN	LOW	LOW	OUT														
Horacio	Red	IN	IN	IN	IN	IN	IN	QUIT															
Philippe	Red	LOW	IN	IN	LOW	IN	LOW																
Mauricio	Yellow	IN	IN	LOW	OUT																		

== Artistic Competition ==
Contestants	Table
(Chile) Francisca Silva	Winner
(Chile) Karen Paola	2º Place
(Chile) Nicole Gómez	3° Place
(Chile) Paolo Ramírez	Place
(Chile) Carla Costa	5° Place
(Chile) Camila Arismendi	Semifinalista; 9° Eliminated
(Chile) Maximiliano Chávez "El Rivalito"	8° Eliminated
(Chile) Rodrigo Tapia	7° Eliminated
(Chile) Jennifer López	6° Eliminated
(Chile) Jonathan Hurtado	5° Eliminated
(United Kingdom) Charlie Bick	4° Eliminated
(Chile) Pía Silva	3° Eliminated
(Chile) Felipe Labrín	2° Eliminated
(Chile) Catalina Tuane	1° Eliminated

=== elimination table ===
	1 (April 25—29)	2 (May 2—6)	3 (May 9—23)	4 (May 24—27)	5 (May 31—June 6)	6 (June 6—13)	7 (June 14—20)	8 (June 21—27)	final	
	1 (April 25—29)	2 (May 2—6)	3 (May 9—23)	4 (May 24—27)	5 (May 31—June 6)	6 (June 6—13)	7 (June 14—20)	8 (June 21—27)	Semifinal (July 11)	Final (July 14)
Francisca Silva	IN	IN	IN	LOW	IN	LOW	IN	IN	IN	WINNER
Karen Paola	IN	IN	LOW	LOW	LOW	LOW	IN	IN	IN	2° Place
Nicole Gómez	IN	LOW	LOW	IN	IN	IN	LOW	LOW	LOW	3° place
Paolo Ramírez			IN	IN	IN	IN	IN	IN	IN	4°Place
Carla Costa	LOW	LOW	IN	IN	IN	IN	LOS	IN	IN	5° Place
Camila Arismendi	IN	LOW	IN	IN	IN	LOW	IN	IN	OUT	
Maximiliano Chávez	LOW	LOW	LOW	LOW	LOW	IN	LOW	OUT		
Rodrigo Tapia	IN	IN	IN	IN	IN	IN	OUT			
Jennifer López	IN	LOW	IN	IN	LOW	OUT				
Jonathan Hurtado	IN	LOW	IN	IN	OUT					
Charlie Bick	LOW	LOW	IN	OUT						
Pía Silva			OUT							
Felipe Labrín	LOW	OUT								
Catalina Tuane	Eliminado									
Final Moment	Catalina Tuane, Maximiliano Chávez	Felipe Labrín, Maximiliano Chávez	Karen Paola, Pía Silva	Charlie Bick, Maximiliano Chávez	Jonathan Hurtado, Karen Paola	Camila Arismendi, Jennifer López	Nicole Gómez, Rodrigo Tapia	Maximiliano Chávez, Nicole Gómez	Nicole Gómez, Camila Arismendi	Nicole Gómez, Carla Costa
Eliminated	Catalina Tuane	Felipe Labrín	Pía Silva	Charlie Bick	Jonathan Hurtado	Jennifer López	Rodrigo Tapia	Maximiliano Chávez	Camila Arismendi	Carla Costa
