= Eduardo Cretton =

Chilean politician (born 1995)

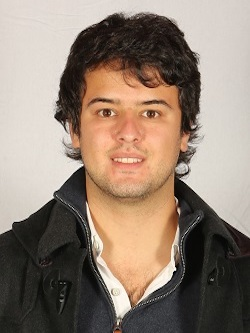

Member of the Chamber of Deputies
- Incumbent
- Assumed office 11 March 2026
- Constituency: 22nd District

Member of the Constitutional Convention
- In office 4 July 2021 – 4 July 2022
- Constituency: 22nd District

Personal details
- Born: 23 November 1995 (age 30) Victoria, Chile
- Party: Independent Democratic Union
- Education: Pontifical Catholic University of Chile (LL.B)
- Occupation: Politician
- Profession: Lawyer

Eduardo Andrés Cretton Rebolledo (born 23 November 1995) is a Chilean lawyer who served as a member of the Chilean Constitutional Convention.

A member of the Independent Democratic Union (UDI), he started his political career as a constituent in Chile’s Constitutional Convention for District 22 (Araucanía Region) from 4 July 2021 to 4 July 2022.

== Biography ==
Cretton was born on 23 November 1995 in Victoria, Araucanía Region, to Eduardo Mauricio Cretton Gay and Pilar Andrea Rebolledo Fuentes.

He completed primary and secondary education at Colegio Santa Cruz in Victoria and earned a law degree from the Pontifical Catholic University of Chile.

During his student years, he participated in initiatives such as the ‘Desafío Levantemos Chile’ social campaign.

== Political career ==
A member of UDI and aligned with the centre-right coalition Chile Vamos, Cretton ran for the 2021 Constitutional Convention, winning 7,936 votes (about 10% of valid votes) in District 22. Within the Convention, he served on the commissions for Participation and Indigenous Consultation; Principles, Democracy, Nationality and Citizenship; and Rights of Indigenous Peoples and Plurinationalism.

Cretton co-proposed a constitutional provision condemning terrorism and ensuring reparations and protections for victims. He also voiced opposition to plurinational structures, questioning their impact on legal equality.

Following the Convention's failure, he actively campaigned for the «Reject» option in the 2022 referendum, citing concerns over plurinationalism, decentralization, and executive power.

After his term, Cretton remained active in public forums; in 2024 he participated in discussions emphasizing political communication and rural values.
