= Daniel Fernández del Castaño =

Argentine model

- Born: Daniel Ignacio Fernandez del Castaño; Buenos Aires, Argentina
- Occupation(s): Model, actor

Daniel Ignacio Fernandez del Castaño (born 1979) is an Argentine model and actor, who is Mister Argentina 2010, also was part of the cast of Yingo in 2008 and from January 2009 is a program participant Youth TVN, Calle 7.

== Career ==
From an early age got into the modeling world, which opened up a role on television, in 2008 was part of the cast of the program Yingo, however a while after he retired to join program Calle 7.

== Calle 7 ==
Daniel get the 5th place in the first season of Calle 7, being removed a day before the Grand Final. While in the second season could reach the semifinal, getting 3rd place. Daniel is currently in competition for the third season. In 2010 debut as an actor in the miniseries of the program.

== Filmography ==
- Yingo (2008)
- Calle 7 (2009–2010)
- Mr. Universo 2010(6th placed)
- personaje en la obra "monologos del pene" teatro monte carmelo(2011-2012)
- personaje en la obra "adentro & afuera" teatro alcala(2012)
