= Catalina Vallejos =

Chilean model (born 1989)

- Born: October 10, 1989 (age 36); Chile
- Occupation: Television Personality

Catalina Alejandra Vallejos Sepúlveda (born October 10, 1989) is a Chilean model, actress and influencer known for winning Miss ATP in 2009 and Calle 7 two times, in 2010 and 2011. She also had a minor role on the telenovela Témpano (2011) and was a cast member on Aquí mando yo (2011−2012), the latter was received with successful ratings and critics reviews. Some sources affirm that she will compete in Miss Universe Chile 2025.

== Career ==
Vallejos was the Miss ATP from Viña del mar 2009; then she works in various events and beauty pageants, as the Miss Movistar Open in 2009 and also in the Corrida Brooks in 2009 and 2010. In 2010, she competed in the Miss Reñaca. In March 2010, Vallejos joined in Calle 7 as a competitor of the season 3, finishing as a semifinalist. She was the winner of the season 4 with Felipe Camus. Also Vallejos starred in the show miniseries as Gaby. Between 2008 and 2009, television producers have offered to join major TV shows such as Amor ciego, Yingo and Calle 7, but could not realize these appearances because her University branches, for these reasons she could not enter into Calle 7 until March 2010. Before joining the program, Vallejos was doing a pilot for a cable sports program, but in the end decided to go Calle 7 because long process of the pilot and paperwork. On January 22, 2011, Catalina and Philippe Trillat won Season 5 of calle 7, making Catalina the first woman to win calle 7 twice. After winning season 5 of Calle 7, she came back not as a competitor, but she came to work on calle 7 web. She then left to join the cast of Aquí mando yo. The telenovela aired from September, 2011 to April, 2012. Vallejos came back to Calle 7 in November 2012 to its eleventh season.

=== Personal life and personal opinions ===
She is a physical education student at Universidad Andrés Bello (Chile).

=== Filmography ===
Year	Title	Role	Notes
2010–2013	Calle 7	Herself	Placed 3rd (tie) (season 3); Winner (season 4 and 5); Web show's host (season 6); Runner-up (season 11 and 12)
2011	Témpano	Daniela Carter	Guest role
2011–2012	Aquí mando yo	Josefina Egaña	Regular role
2014	Sin uniforme	Hostess	Etc...TV show

=== Modeling titles ===
- Miss ATP from Viña del mar - Winner (2009)
