= Chapu (entertainer) =

Chilean actor, circus worker and television personality

Francisco Javier Puelles Gana
- Born: December 4, 1984 (age 40); Chile
- Occupation(s): Actor; Television Personality

Francisco Javier Puelles Gana (born December 4, 1984) is a Chilean actor, circus worker and television personality best known as "Chapu" because of his role in Calle 7 and Circo de estrellas being the Winner of both game shows. Also Puelles has his own circus named Universal Circus: El circo de Chapu, inaugurated in Talca, Chile.

== Television ==
Chapu was an actor in Pasiones in 2008. In 2009 he worked in Calle 7 being the winner of the first season, and winner of the second season, he won 5 millions of pesos chilenos for each season. He was a competitor in Season 3 and 4. Puelles is one of the most popular competitors of the show. He was the winner of Circo de estrellas in 2010.

He acted in the series Amores de Calle as Antonio in the pilot episode, later as Diego with his girlfriend Catalina Vallejos.

Puelles has two songs, "Afortunado" (2009) and "Mejor soltero" (2010).

Also Puelles has his own circus named Universal Circus: El circo de Chapu, inaugurated in Talca, Chile. In Calle 7 he did his own docu-reality. In 2010 Puelles was the winner of the Corrida Brooks in Santiago

In 2010 Puelles worked for Buenos Días a Todos (show host by Felipe Camiroaga and Katherine Salosny). For this job, he traveled to Las Vegas in USA with Maite Orsini.

== Filmography ==
- Pasiones (2008)
- Calle 7 (2009–2010)
- Circo de estrellas (Chile) (2010)
- Amores de Calle (2010)
- El docu de Chapu (2010)
- Buenos Días a Todos (2010)
- Témpano (2011)
- Pobre Rico (2012-2013)
- Somos los carmona (2013-2014)
- Pituca sin lucas (2014-2015)
- Pobre Gallo (2016)
- Tranquilo papá (2017)
