= Calle 7 =

- Created by: Daniel Sagüés
- Starring: Jean Philippe Cretton; Martín Cárcamo (seasons 1–4); Rodrigo del Real "Rigeo" (season 3+); Karen Doggenweiler (season 1); Valeria Ortega (seasons 3–5; on Internet); Alain Soulat (season 5+; on Internet)
- Country of origin: Chile

Production
- Production locations: TVN Studios; Santiago, Chile
- Running time: 120 minutes

Original release
- Network: TVN
- Release: January 12, 2009 – May 31, 2013

Calle 7 was a Chilean television program, shown by TVN from Monday to Friday at 6 pm. It was last co-hosted by Alain Soulat and Lucia Covarrubias, and involved two teams of young adult contenders participating in unique challenges and performing arts to win a top prize at the end of the competition.

== Early months ==
Calle 7 began airing on January 12, 2009, at 6 pm and was presented by Martín Cárcamo and Karen Doggenweiler. The program was aimed at youth and family area where a group of participants known as "Team Calle 7" danced and competed in several tests, where the winning team gave $100,000 Chilean pesos to a viewer. The changes began with the exit of Karen Doggenweiler, on February 20, 2009, because she went to host of another project at the station called, Todos a Coro, an adaptation to the British program from BBC, Last Choir Standing, that began airing in March 2009. However changes to the program became clear when the result on the ratings came out. The level of audience for Calle 7 was about 8 points, low compared to competition. Rumors of cancellation where everywhere, but lately ratings have shown Calle 7 beating the competition. In this re-formatting of the program, "the Team Calle 7" was divided in two teams (yellow and red) and competed in different contests to win points. The winners won great prizes, while the losers were suffering hard challenges.

== Seasons ==
| | Premiere | Finale | Winner | Runner-up | Number of contestants | Spirit of Calle 7 |
|---|---|---|---|---|---|---|
| Season One | March 9, 2009 | July 31, 2009 | Francisco Puelles | Valentina Roth | 27 | Francisco Puelles |
| Season Two | August 3, 2009 | January 29, 2010 | Francisco Puelles | Felipe Camus | 31 | Felipe Camus |
| Season Three | March 15, 2010 | June 5, 2010 | Maite Orsini and Francisco Rodríguez | Camila Nash and Federico Koch | 26 | Alain Soulat |
| Season Four | June 7, 2010 | November 13, 2010 | Catalina Vallejos and Felipe Camus | Camila Nash and Francisco Puelles | 22 | Felipe Camus |
| Season Five | November 15, 2010 | January 22, 2011 | Catalina Vallejos and Philippe Trillat | Karen Paola and Juan Carlos Palma | 20 | Juan Pedro Verdier |
| Season Six | February 28, 2011 | July 15, 2011 | Romina Parraguirre and Juan Carlos Palma | Tamara Primus and Maximiliano Cruchaga | 29 | Katherina Contreras |
| Season Seven | July 18, 2011 | November 10, 2011 | Bárbara Hofmann and Federico Koch | Tamara Primus and Juan Carlos Palma | | Claudio Valdivia |
| Season Eight | January 2, 2012 | March 26, 2012 | Romina Parraguirre and Charlie Bick | Jocelyn Medina and Claudio Valdivia | | Nicole Ugarte |
| Season Nine | April 2, 2012 | July 13, 2012 | Fernanda Gallardo and Federico Koch | Jocelyn Medina and Juan Carlos Palma | 20 | Jacqueline Gaete |
| Season Ten | July 23, 2012 | October 26, 2012 | Fernanda Gallardo and Federico Koch | Jocelyn Medina and Charlie Bick | 20 | Felipe Camus |
| Season Eleven | November 5, 2012 | February 15, 2013 | Danae Vergara and Felipe Camus | Catalina Vallejos and Charlie Bick | 25 | Danae Vergara |
| Season Twelve | March 4, 2013 | May 31, 2013 | Fernanda Gallardo and Francisco Rodríguez | Catalina Vallejos and Stefano Ciaravino | 23 | Camila Nash |

Note
In seasons six, seven and nine two finals were made, divided by gender. In seasons three, four, five and eight the final was contested between two couples.

=== Season 1 ===
The first season premiered on March 2, 2009. On this season the cast of Calle 7 formed the yellow team as "Team Calle 7" and new participant formed "The Challengers" (red team). Competing every Tuesdays and Thursdays, the team with less score nominated one contestant of their own team and the Fridays one cast member was eliminated. The competition started on March 9 and the finale of the season was on July 31 and the winners was Francisco "Chapu" Puelles.

=== Season 2 ===
The second season of Calle 7 began on Monday, August 3, 2009. The new competitors were presented, and called "Challenging team", they will team up to compete against the well known "Team Calle 7" that includes all cast members of the season one and the winner Francisco "Chapu" Puelles. The competition system is the same as the one utilized in the first season; on Mondays and Wednesdays, the two teams compete in three events, each worth 100, 200 and 300 points. The winner of those days is saved from competing in elimination, while the loser has to compete among themselves on Tuesdays and Thursdays to elect a nominated team member. The elimination competition was on Fridays, and the loser leaves Calle 7 for ever. The winners of this was again Francisco "Chapu" Puelles.

=== Season 3 ===
Before the start of season three, there was a pre-season from February 1 to 26, the participants were divided in the yellow and red teams, which competed from Monday to Friday in three tests and the winning team earned a sum of money. The raised money was donated to the victims of the 2010 Chile earthquake. Finely the third season of Calle 7 began two weeks after at the end of the pre-season, in this period of time the program was not delivered due to the earthquake that struck the central-southern of Chile, becoming the March 15. This time the competition system was in mixed couples, but compete in the familiar yellow and red teams. The winners of this season were Maite Orsini and Francisco "Pancho" Rodríguez.

=== Season 4 ===
The fourth season was premiered on June 7, 2010. Like the third season the system of the competition was in mixed couples. In October 2010 it was announced that former co-host Jean Philippe Cretton was replacing Martin Carcamo as the program's host. It was never mentioned that Martín Cárcamo left the program due to his contractual signing with Canal 13. The final was held on Saturday November 13, 2010 in primetime. Felipe Camus and Catalina Vallejos were the big winners winning $6.000.000 Chilean pesos.

=== Season 5 ===
The season began on November 15, 2010, new participants were introduced as some of the known cast did not return. The style of competition is the same, the two teams contain the designated couples and the competitions are similar to previous seasons. This season, in addition to the award of six million Chilean pesos, the winning couple will get a zero km car.

== Calle 7 OnLine ==
Calle 7 OnLine (also known as the "tiendita") is the satellite of Calle 7 delivered virtually through TVN's website from 18:00 to 19:00. It began broadcasting on Wednesday June 3, 2009 to be presented officially to all Chile on June 11, 2009 live on Calle 7, becoming the first program in a dual issue and live (television and the Internet) in Chile. The online program, which was led by Jean Philippe Cretton until he became the co-host of Calle 7, is a sort of online backstage where participants interact with viewers, who send their comments immediately through a chat system through the platform provided Cover It Live, and subsequently was formally led by Valeria Ortega a few days after Nicolas Opazo did, then made Ronny "Dance" Munizaga and from April 19, 2010 was taken up officially by Valeria Ortega.

== Contestants timeline ==
| Season | 1 | 2 | 3 | 4 | 5 | 6 | 7 | 8 | 9 | 10 | 11 | 12 |
|---|---|---|---|---|---|---|---|---|---|---|---|---|
Contestants
| Francisco P. | W | W | SF | F | Absent | | | | | | | |
| Valentina R. | F | 5th | Q | Absent | | | | 8th | Absent | | | |
| Francisco R. | SF | 9th | W | 13th | Q | Absent | | | | | | W |
| Felipe C. | 13th | F | 15th | W | 6th | SF | A | SF | 5th | 4th | W | 4th |
| Juan Pablo | 18th | SF | SF | 4th | 5th | 8th | Absent | | | | 6th | 5th |
| Maite | A | 10th | W | 5th | Absent | | | | | | | |
| Catalina | A | A | SF | W | W | Absent | | | | | F | F |
| Federico | A | A | F | 11th | A | 4th | W | A | W | W | SF | 7th |
| Juan Carlos | A | A | 17th | 5th | F | W | F | 12th | F | 6th | A | A |
| Camila N. | Q | A | F | F | 5th | 13th | Absent | | | 6th | SF | 4th |
| Philippe | A | A | 6th | 8th | W | Q | Absent | | | | | |
| Fernanda G. | Absent | | | | SF | 6th | Absent | | W | W | 7th | W |
| Romina P. | Absent | | | | | W | 13th | W | Absent | | | |
| Charlie | Absent | | | | | | SF | W | SF | F | F | SF |
| Bárbara | Absent | | | | | | W | Absent | | | | |
| Tamara | Absent | | | | 4th | F | F | Absent | | | | 17th |
| Jocelyn | Absent | | | | | | | F | F | F | A | A |
| Danae | Absent | | | | | | | | | | W | A |
