= Pelotón =

- Starring: Felipe Camiroaga; Bárbara Rebolledo; Rafael Araneda; Karen Doggenweiler; Macarena Tondreau
- Country of origin: Chile
- No. of seasons: 4
- No. of episodes: 471

Production
- Executive producer: Nicolás Quesille
- Running time: 120 minutes (including commercials)

Original release
- Network: TVN
- Release: January 2, 2007 – December 21, 2010

Pelotón (Spanish for "platoon") is a Chilean reality show on Televisión Nacional de Chile in which the participants undergo an intense regime of military training. The winner receives 50 million pesos. The first season aired January 2 – May 5, 2007, and the second season ran from October 2, 2007, to March 11, 2008. The third season were premiere in July 2009 and the contestants were Chilean celebrities. The third and 4th season were shooting back to back, and like last season the majority of participants were celebrities.

== Airing of the show ==
Season	Season premiere	Season finale	Winner	Runner up	Instructor	Number of contestants	Number of episodes
Pelotón I El Honor Esta En Juego	January 2, 2007	May 7, 2007	Juan Pablo Matulic	Yángelo Gutiérrez	Reinaldo González	20	124
Pelotón II El Honor Esta En Juego	October 2, 2007	March 11, 2008	Martín Hereveri	Felipe Arancibia	Reinaldo González	24	140
Pelotón III La Fama Esta En Juego	June 29, 2009	November 17, 2009	Francisco Schilling	María Eugenia Larraín	René O'Ryan Salazar	21	115
Pelotón IV La Fama Esta En Juego	November 3, 2009	March 28, 2010	Francisco Rodriguez	William Orock	Jorge Devia Salas	20	92
Pelotón V Dinastia Del Honor	September 20, 2010	December 21, 2010	Federico Koch	Romina Parraguirre	Jorge Devia Salas	20	53
