= Maite Orsini =

Chilean lawyer and politician

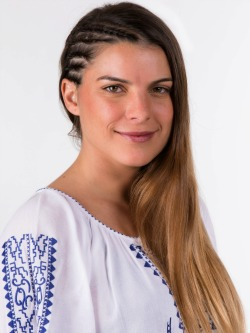

Personal details
- Born: Maite Orsini Pascal; February 23, 1988 (age 38) Chile, Santiago
- Party: Democratic Revolution
- Occupation: politician, Lawyer, Actress & Model
- Known for: Reality shows: Amor ciego II and Calle 7

Maite Orsini Pascal (born February 23, 1988, in Santiago, Chile) is a Chilean lawyer and politician, and former actress and model. Beginning in 2017, she has represented the 9th District in the Chamber of Deputies of Chile.

== Acting career ==
Maite has played important roles in different TV series such as Los Venegas (1994–1997) and Fuera de control (1999). During her teenage years, she appeared in a vast number of commercials and got a few modeling gigs. She also appeared on the reality TVshow Amor ciego II and on another show called Yingo during May 2009. As of October 2009 she joined the cast of Calle 7, a reality TV game show where contestants compete to win cash and other prizes .

Besides Calle7, she was also a contestant on Circo de estrellas (as a replacement for Alejandra Fosalba), but then decided to leave for personal problems. On June 5, 2010, she and Francisco Rodriguez won the third season of Calle 7, and walked away with a monetary prize of six million Chilean pesos for both contestants.

She also collaborated with other members of Calle7 in producing the show's first CD album in which she starred in two of the song tracks; one called "Me vuelvo loca"and the other "No lo puedo evitar".

In 2010, Maite competed for "Queen of the Bicentennial in Colina" but remained first runner up after being defeated by Pamela Diaz.

In October 2010 it was announced that Maite and Francisco "Chapu" Puelles would travel to the United States of America, as part of a special report for the program "Buenos días a todos".

She left Calle 7 in November 2010, because she wanted to dedicate more time to school. In 2011, Orsini will star in a TVN series called El Laberindo de Alicia, playing the character of Dolores.

=== Personal life ===
She is the daughter of producer Ricardo Orsini Roccatagliata and actress Maite Pascal Barayón who are divorced. Through her father, she is a second cousin of actress and yoga instructor Antonella Orsini and through her mother, she is a second cousin of actors Pedro Pascal and Lux Pascal.

== Filmography ==
=== Teleseries ===
Year	Teleserie	Character	Channel
2011	El laberinto de Alicia	Dolores	TVN
2009	Infieles	Kuky	Chilevision
2000	Ojo con los niños		Chilevisión
1999	Fuera de control	Amanda Cervantes	Canal 13
1994–1997	Los Venegas	Camila Ríos Venegas	TVN

=== Realities ===
Year	Reality	Channel
2010	Circo de estrellas	TVN
2009–2010	Calle 7	TVN
2009	Yingo	Chilevisión
2008	Amor ciego II	Canal 13
2008	SQP	Chilevisión
