= Drag Race Philippines season 4 =

2026 season of television series

Drag Race Philippines
- Season 4
- Promotional poster for season four
- Hosted by: Paolo Ballesteros
- Judges: Paolo Ballesteros; KaladKaren; Rajo Laurel; Jon Santos; BJ Pascual
- No. of contestants: 12
- No. of episodes: 8

Release
- Original network: WOW Presents Plus (International)
- Original release: September 25, 2026 – present

Season chronology
- ← Previous; Season 3

The fourth season of Drag Race Philippines premiered on 25 September 2026. The season airs on WOW Presents Plus internationally. The season was confirmed by World of Wonder on 16 October 2025.

== Production ==
A casting call was announced on January 10, 2026. Production was paused in April, following the death of contestant Misua during the filming of episode 2.

== Contestants ==
Drag Race Philippines season 4 contestants and their backgrounds (Note: All ages, names, with hometowns, and outcome are stated at time of filming.)
Contestant	Age	Hometown	Outcome
Katana	24	Santiago, Isabela	TBA
Manza	31	Nabunturan, Davao De Oro	TBA
Maureen Biology	27	Baguio, Benguet	TBA
Valeria (Note: Valeria Ortega, also known as Valeria Kurihara, is referred to as Valeria on the show.)	28	Manila, Metro Manila	TBA
Taylor Sheesh	31	Antipolo, Rizal	5th place
Merckz	28	Antipolo, Rizal	6th place
Andy Crocker	34	Caloocan, Metro Manila	7th place
Bhorj Gum	28	Bacolod, Negros Occidental	8th place
Bombalicious Eklaver	46	Baltimore, United States	9th place
Ghulli Ghush	30	Cavite City, Cavite	10th place
Dixxxy Decoy	23	Davao City, Davao Del Sur	11th place
Misua	27	Cagayan de Oro, Misamis Oriental	Not placed (Note: Misua died in the midst of filming Episode 2 and therefore did not receive an official placement.)

Footnotes

== Contestant progress ==
Legend:

WIN indicates that the contestant won the challenge.
TOP2 indicates that the contestant was one of the two best performing in the challenge, but lost the lip sync to win it.
SAFE indicates that the contestant was declared safe by the judges.
BLT indicates that Valeria was given the Golden Balut by the other contestants, securing her a spot in the finale.
BTM (Bottom) indicates that the contestant was up for elimination.
ELIM (Eliminated) indicates that the contestant was eliminated.
Guest indicates that the contestant returned as a guest.
† indicates the contestant passed away during filming and received no official placement.

Contestants progress with placements in each episode
Contestant	Episode										
Contestant	1 (Note: In episode 1, Bhorj Gum and Taylor Sheesh were announced as bottom two of the week. However, it was later announced that there would be no eliminations.)	2	3	4	5	6	7	8	9		10
Katana	WIN	TOP2	SAFE	WIN	SAFE	SAFE	SAFE	SAFE	SAFE		TBA
Manza	WIN	SAFE	SAFE	SAFE	SAFE	SAFE	SAFE	BTM	BTM		TBA
Maureen Biology	SAFE	SAFE	WIN	SAFE	SAFE	BTM	WIN	WIN	SAFE		TBA
Valeria	SAFE	SAFE	SAFE	SAFE	SAFE	SAFE	SAFE	SAFE	WIN	BLT	TBA
Taylor Sheesh	BTM	SAFE	SAFE	SAFE	SAFE	WIN	BTM	SAFE	ELIM		TBA
Merckz	SAFE	WIN	SAFE	SAFE	SAFE	SAFE	SAFE	ELIM	Guest		Guest
Andy Crocker	SAFE	SAFE	BTM	SAFE	BTM	SAFE	ELIM		Guest		Guest
Bhorj Gum	BTM	SAFE	SAFE	SAFE	WIN	ELIM			Guest		Guest
Bombalicious Eklaver	SAFE	SAFE	SAFE	BTM	ELIM				Guest		Guest
Ghulli Ghush	SAFE	SAFE	SAFE	ELIM					Guest		Guest
Dixxxy Decoy	SAFE	SAFE	ELIM						Guest		Guest
Misua	SAFE	†									

== Lip syncs ==
The contestant won the lip sync to win the challenge.
The contestant was eliminated after their first time in the bottom.
The contestant was eliminated after their second time in the bottom.
The contestant was eliminated after their third time in the bottom.

Episode	Top contestants			Song	Winner(s)
1	Katana	vs.	Manza	"No Apology (Wala Akong Paki)" (Karencitta)	Katana
1	Katana	vs.	Manza	"No Apology (Wala Akong Paki)" (Karencitta)	Manza
2	Katana	vs.	Merckz	"Dilaw" (Maki)	Merckz
Episode	Bottom contestants			Song	Eliminated
3	Andy Crocker	vs.	Dixxxy Decoy	"Salamin, Salamin" (BINI)	Dixxxy Decoy
4	Bombalicious Eklaver	vs.	Ghulli Ghush	"Boomerang" (G22)	Ghulli Ghush
5	Andy Crocker	vs.	Bombalicious Eklaver	"Mano Po Ninong" (Pilita Corrales)	Bombalicious Eklaver
6	Bhorj Gum	vs.	Maureen Biology	"Halata" (Paul Pablo)	Bhorj Gum
7	Andy Crocker	vs.	Taylor Sheesh	"Masunog Man" (Maymay Entrata)	Andy Crocker
8	Manza	vs.	Merckz	"Bakit Ako Mahihiya" (K Brosas)	Merckz
9	Manza	vs.	Taylor Sheesh	"Ganda Gandahan" (Dia Maté)	Taylor Sheesh

== Guest judges ==
Listed in chronological order:

- Sofronio Vasquez, singer
- Maki, singer and songwriter
- Mark Bumgarner, fashion designer
- Sam Concepcion, actor, singer and dancer
- Rufa Mae Quinto, actress and comedian
- Kara David, journalist and television host
- Brigiding, contestant on Drag Race Philippines season 1 and winner of Slaysian Royale
- K Brosas, actress, comedian, singer and television host
- Dia Maté, singer and Reina Hispanoamericana 2025
- Gawdland, contestant on Drag Race Thailand season 3 and winner of RuPaul's Drag Race: UK vs. the World series 3

=== Special guests ===
Guests who appeared in episodes, but did not judge on the main stage.

Episode 2:

- Moophs, musician, producer, songwriter and DJ

Episode 4:

- Norvina, president of Anastasia Beverly Hills
- Cecile Martinez, choreographer

Episode 7:

- Marina Summers, runner-up of Drag Race Philippines season 1 and contestant on RuPaul's Drag Race: UK vs. the World series 2
- Arizona Brandy, runner-up of Drag Race Philippines season 2 and contestant on Slaysian Royale
- Khianna, runner-up of Drag Race Philippines season 3 and contestant on Slaysian Royale
- Viñas DeLuxe, contestant on Drag Race Philippines season 1 and runner-up of Slaysian Royale

== Episodes ==
No. overall	No. in series	Title	Original release date
31	1	"Show Me Your T.I.T.E. (Totally Impressive Talent Extravaganza)"	September 25, 2026
32	2	"Can I Get An Eme?"	October 2, 2026
33	3	"Beks 2 Skul Ball"	October 9, 2026
34	4	"The Gayest Shokla: The Rusical"	October 16, 2026
35	5	"Snatch Game KNB?"	October 23, 2026
36	6	"Beking News"	October 30, 2026
37	7	"The Runners-Up Roast"	November 6, 2026
38	8	"Drag Dynasty"	November 13, 2026
39	9	"Forda Crown"	November 20, 2026
