= Martín Cárcamo =

Chilean television presenter (born 1975)

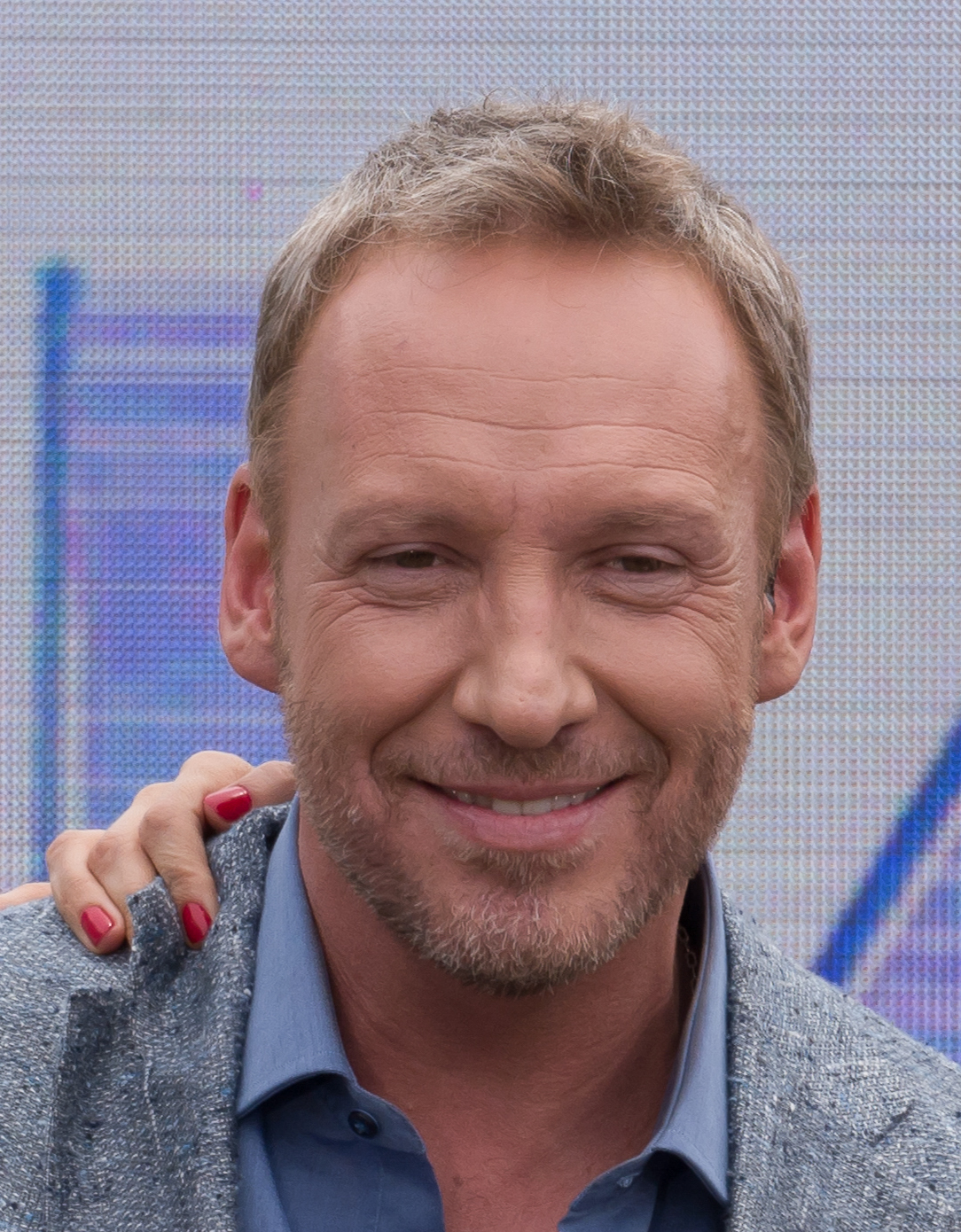
- Cárcamo in 2019
- Born: Martín Andrés Cárcamo Papic; April 21, 1975 (age 51); Viña del Mar, Chile
- Occupations: Television presenter, actor

Martín Andrés Cárcamo Papic (born April 21, 1975) is a Chilean television presenter, actor and former host of Pasiones and El Último Pasajero.

He debuted in television on the Chilean TV channel Rock & Pop where he was the host of Media Naranja and Noches de Verano. Later in 2004, he joined TVN as the host of Pasiones, replacing Felipe Camiroaga. In 2008, Cárcamo replaced Rafael Araneda in Rojo, Fama Contrafama. In 2009, he was a judge of the Festival de Viña del Mar, and until recently, he hosted Calle 7.

In October 2010, it was announced that Cárcamo left TVN to join rival channel Canal 13, where he started working in January 2011.

As a theatre actor, Cárcamo was part of Ellas Quieren y Él No Puede.

== Television shows ==
=== Canal 2 Rock & Pop ===
- Media Naranja
- Noches de Verano

=== Chilevisión ===
- Extra Jóvenes
- Ya Siento que Vienen por mí
- Amor a Ciegas
- El Último Apaga la Luz
- Panoramix
- Primer Plano

=== Televisión Nacional de Chile ===
- Pasiones
- Corre Video
- Cada Loco con su Tema
- El Último Pasajero
- Rojo, el valor del talento
- Calle 7

=== Canal 13 (Chile) ===
- Bienvenidos
- Quiero Mi Fiesta
- Vértigo
- Bailando por un sueño
- De Tú a Tú
- ¡Qué Dice Chile!
