= Jean Philippe Cretton =

Chilean television presenter and journalist

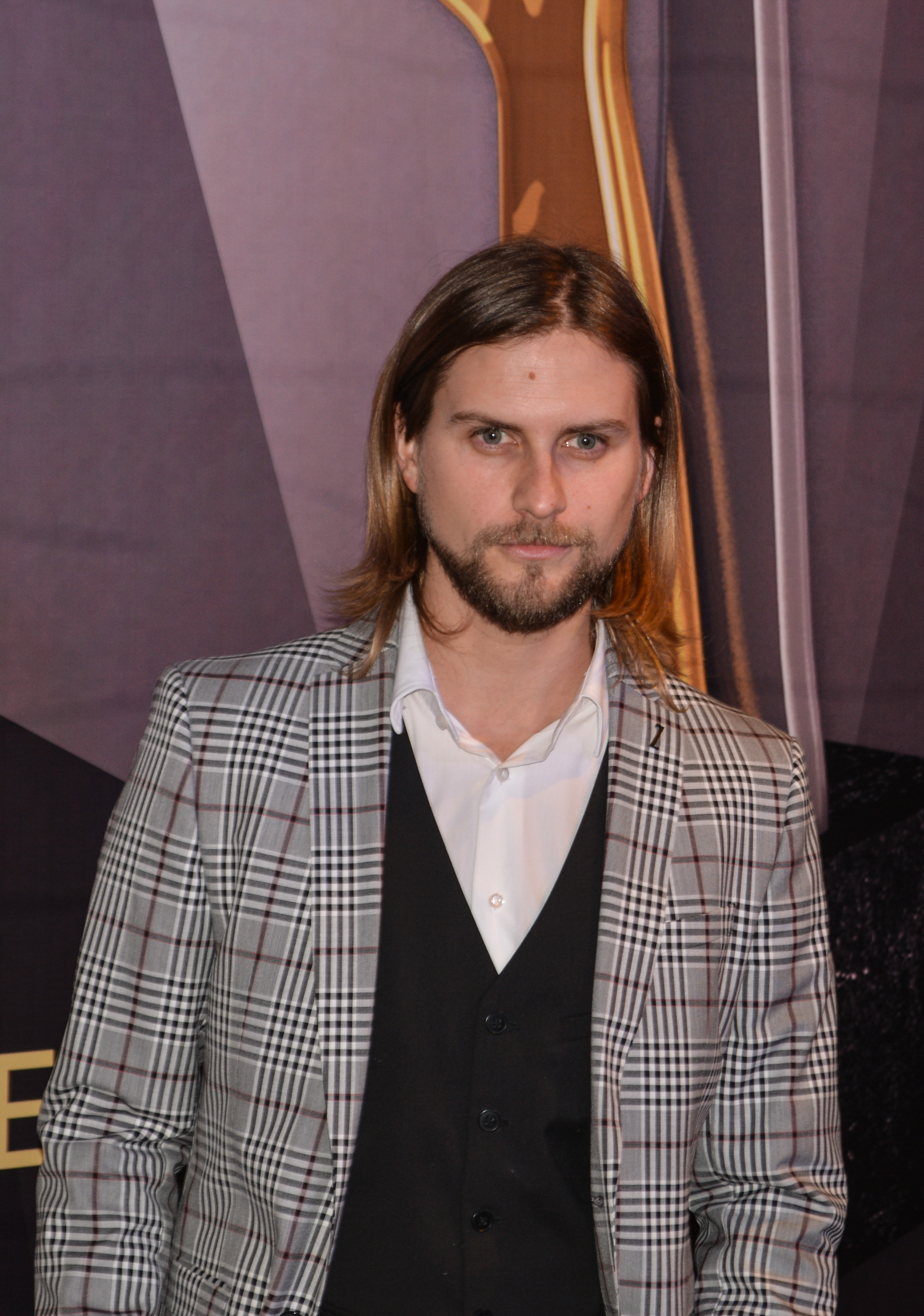
- Cretton in 2017
- Born: 21 January 1985 (age 41); Victoria, Chile
- Education: Andrés Bello National University
- Occupations: Television presenter, journalist, and musician
- Years active: 2007–present
- Partner: Maria Paz Igualt (2013–2019)
- Children: Moana Cretton

Jean Philippe Cretton Vásquez (b. Victoria, 21 January 1985) is a Chilean television presenter and journalist. He was the co-host of Televisión Nacional de Chile's program Calle 7 until 31 August 2010, and main host beginning on 26 October of that year and until 2013.

== Biography ==
Cretton Vásquez was born in Victoria, Chile in 1985 where he spent most of his childhood. Years later, because of his father's work, he moved to Santiago de Chile, and began his studies there. Although he wanted to study music, he ended up studying journalism at Andrés Bello National University.

In February 2009, he joined Calle 7 in Televisión Nacional de Chile, with contests for the audience and also as the hoster of the online version, Calle 7 Online; He soon became the co-hoster of the programme, holding the position for a year, until 31 August 2010, when he decided to retire for personal reasons. However, he returned as the main host of the program on 26 October of that year.

After the 2010 Chilean earthquake, Cretton worked in Televisión Nacional de Chile's special programme Fuerza Chile, as a journalist in-scene in the regions of Maule and Bío Bío.

He hosted an online show called Sería todo with journalist Nicolás Opazo. In September 2010, he began hosting Abre los ojos. He was awarded the TV Grama award for "Best Young Hoster" in 2010. He signed a three-year contract with Televisión Nacional de Chile that same year.

In January 2013, he signed a contract for two years to work at La Red, conducting Mentiras verdaderas.

In radio, Cretton leads Radar 18–20 hrs in Rock and Pop from August 2013.

== TV work ==
| Year | Programme | Role | Channel |
|---|---|---|---|
| 2007–2008 | C.Q.C | Journalist | Mega |
| 2009–2013 | Calle 7 | Contest hoster (2009) / Dual hoster (2009) / Co-hoster (2009–2010) / Main hoster (2010–2013) | TVN |
| 2010 | Abre los Ojos | Panelist | TVN |
| 2012 | El mejor de Chile | Backstage hoster | TVN |
| 2013 | Mentiras verdaderas | Hoster | La Red |
| 2013 | Así somos | Panelist | La Red |
| 2013 | Mañaneros | Panelist | La Red |

== Musical career ==
Cretton was a member of a band called Siberia, with which he recorded two studio albums as the vocalist, songwriter and guitarist. He is currently part of Crettinos, an electronic pop-rock duo, with Claudio Carrizo.
