= Multivía =

Smart card for payment on Santiago public transport

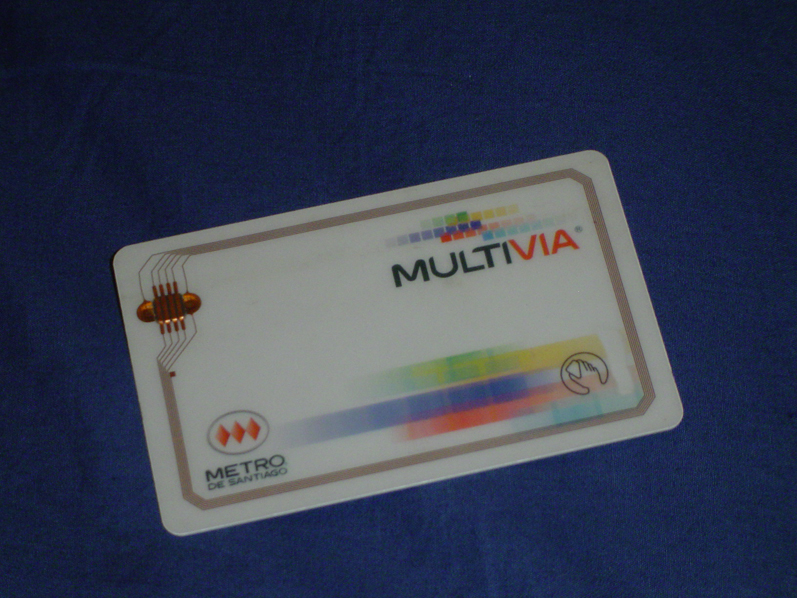
- A Multivía card.
- Location: Santiago, Chile
- Launched: 24 February 2003
- Discontinued: 1 August 2011
- Manager: Metro de Santiago
- Currency: Chilean peso
- Stored-value: Pay-as-you-go
- Validity: Metro de Santiago; Transantiago (2007-2011)

Multivía was a contactless card designed for paying the travel fares in the mass transport system Transantiago, in Santiago, the capital of Chile. It was replaced by Tarjeta bip! since 2007 and was completely phased-out in 2011. It was a plastic card equipped with a chip that automatically discounts the cost of a travel when passing the card near a contactless card reader.

== History ==
Initial testing began in December 2002, with definitive implementation on the Santiago Metro network beginning on 24 February 2003. By December 2004, there were 1.3 million cards in circulation, and by the end of 2005, the number had reached 1.6 million. The card was also implemented on Metrobús routes.

Its branding and usufruct rights were transferred to the Transantiago Financial Administrator for use in conjunction with the Transantiago plan.

In June 2011, the imminent phasing-out of the card, which could be exchanged free of charge for a Tarjeta bip!, was announced. This was part of a plan that involved replacing cards at authorized locations (mostly Bip! Centers), maintaining the balance of the Multivía card. On 1 August 2011, this card was permanently disabled.

== Features ==
This system used a contactless smart card, made of laser-printed polymer plastic, with a chip and a copper filament. The chip communicated with a card reader, located at each payment station, through induction, transferring information at a transfer rate ranging from 106 to 848 kb/s. The contact distance between the reader and the card is 10 cm according to the ISO/IEC 14443 standard of 2001.

The card was rechargeable, meaning it could be recharged with a specified amount multiple times at authorized charging stations, always in increments of CLP 500 with a maximum of CLP 20,000. This was intended to eliminate the use of cash as a payment method and to integrate fare across the Metro and Transantiago.
