= Tarjeta bip! =

Payment method for public transport in Santiago, Chile

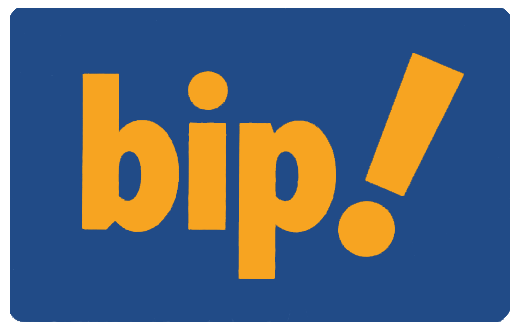
- Short name: bip!
- Location: Santiago, Chile
- Launched: 10 February 2007
- Manager: Metro de Santiago
- Currency: Chilean peso ($0 minimum load, $25,500 maximum load)
- Stored-value: Pay-as-you-go
- Validity: Metro de Santiago; Red Metropolitana de Movilidad; Metrotren Nos

Tarjeta bip! ("bip! card") is the contactless payment method used in the public transportation system of Red Metropolitana de Movilidad in the metropolitan region of Santiago, Chile.

It is issued and maintained by Metro de Santiago. The name is primarily due to the similarity to the beep sound emitted when passed through a validator or automatic ticket collector. It works similarly to a debit card, requiring payment before traveling, and the balance is deducted when traveling by bus or metro, depending on the fare segment and mode of transportation used. Part of the technology's compatibility with the Santiago Metro is due to the fact that it coexisted with the Multivía card until August 2011.

== History ==
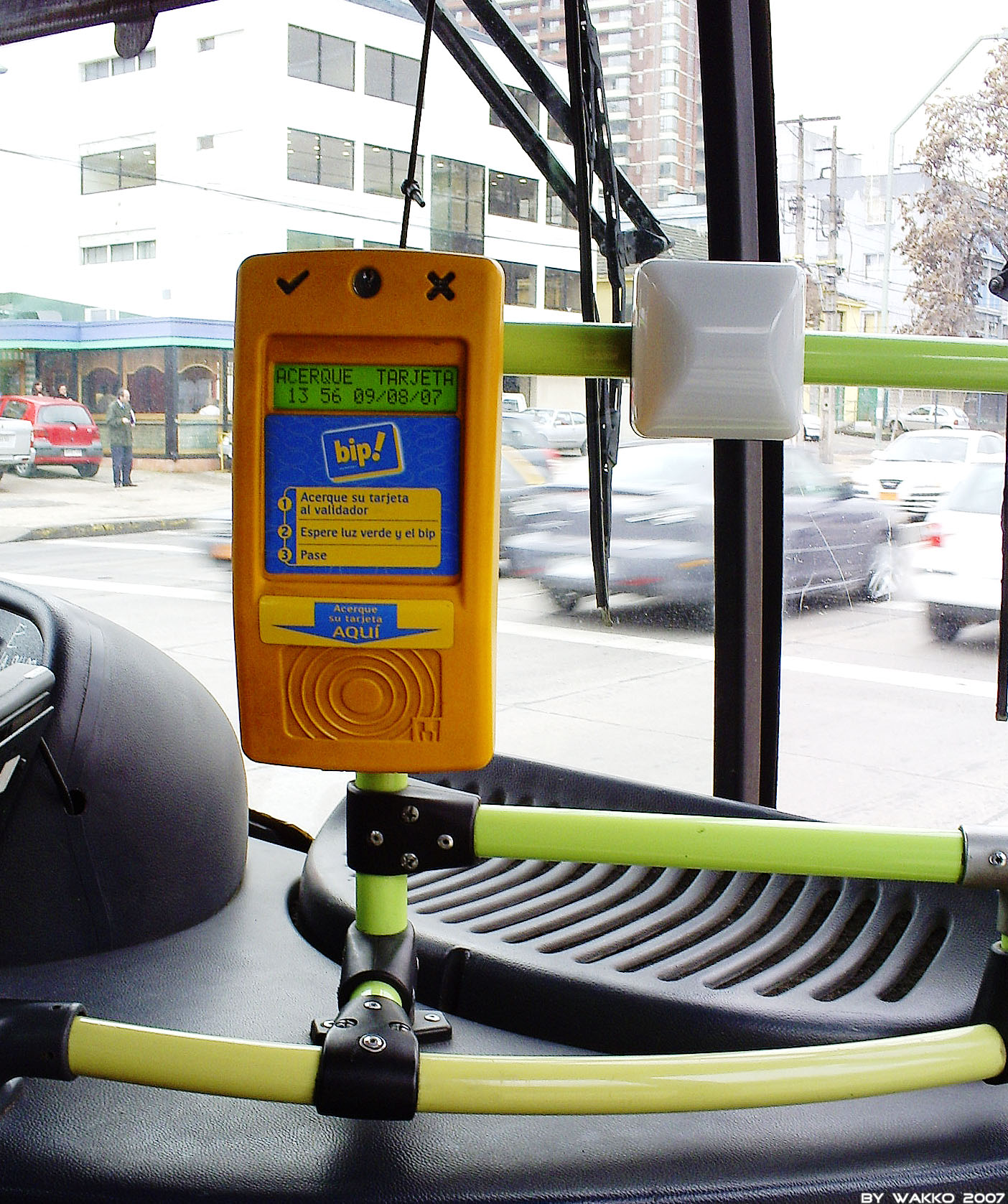
First-generation bip! validator on a Transantiago bus (2007).

On 9 February 2007, hours before the implementation of Transantiago, Transport Minister Sergio Espejo announced the system would be free for the first three days, between 10 and 12 February. He stated primarily that this would allow users to familiarize themselves with the routes throughout the capital, postponing the start of fare collection until 13 February. However, early that day, Ministry of Transport inspectors detected an average 15% failure rate in the bus validators, prompting the AFT to make the system free until Friday for trunk buses and Sunday for feeder buses.

The delay caused by the change in date resulted in a multi-million-dollar fine for AFT companies, close to 300 million pesos, due to the failure to meet the implementation date for the payment technology on buses. In the days following the fine, on the second attempt to put the fare collection system into operation on Friday, 17 February, validators and users responded favorably to the change, detecting an error rate of close to 2% on the buses that went into circulation. Even so, the evasion rate in areas with high concentrations of people was very high. To solve this problem, "extra-vehicular payment zones" were created, that is, payment zones outside the vehicles, before accessing the stop. This allows users faster access to buses and prevents payment evasion.

According to a December 2007 survey conducted by the Central University of Chile, Transantiago users expressed great satisfaction with the payment method implemented in Santiago. The survey showed that the Tarjeta bip! received a score of 5.53 (out of 7.0) out of 600 respondents, leaving the Transantiago Financial Administrator quite satisfied with people's perception of the payment method. This result was the attribute most highly rated by Santiago residents regarding Transantiago.

== Types of cards ==
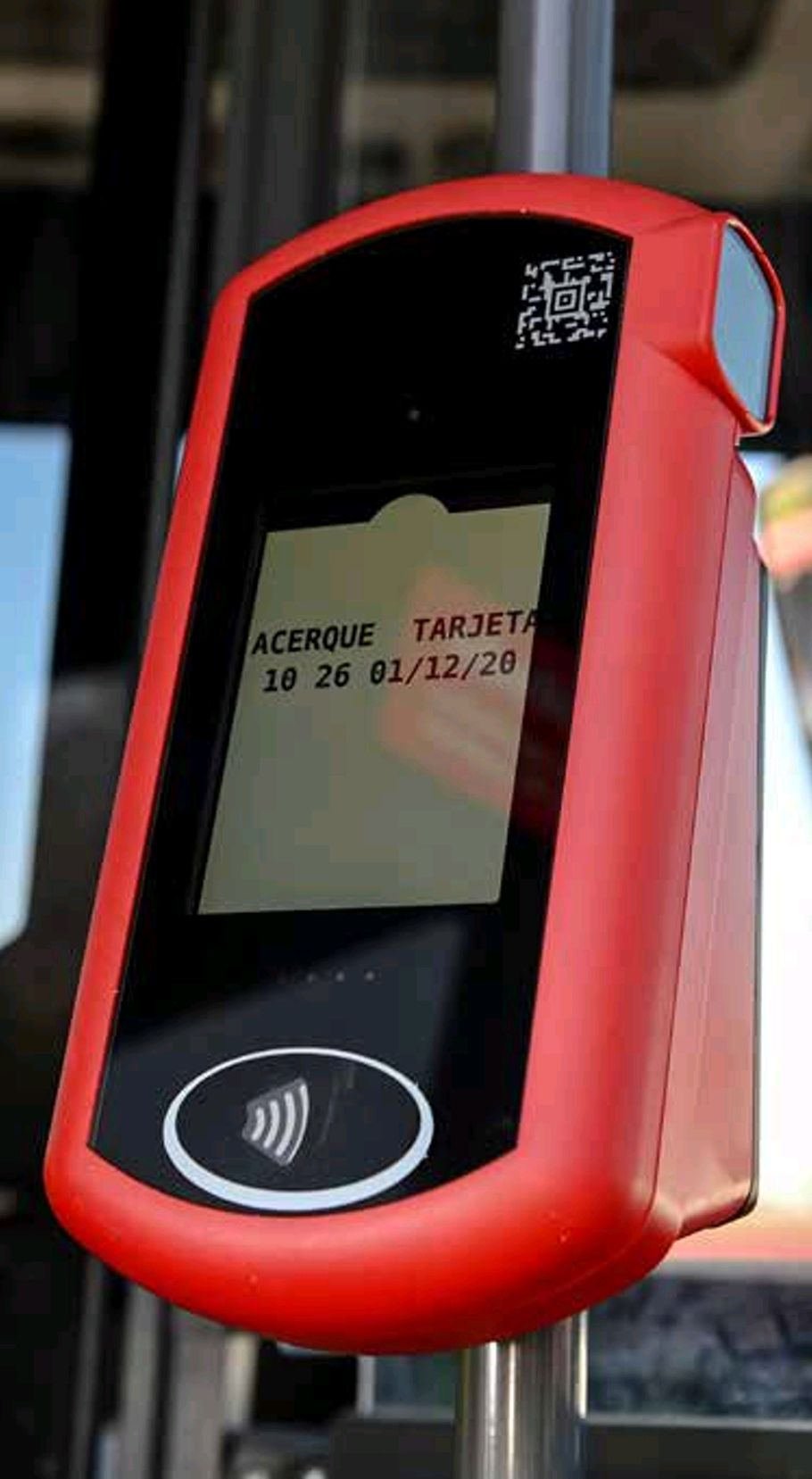
Second-generation bip! validator, used since 2022 and that allows QR code reading.

There is two kinds of payments that can be possible with the bip! system: the physical bip! card and Cuenta bip!QR, a virtual payment system through QR codes displayed on smartphones.

=== Physical cards ===
- Bip! bearer card: It is a contactless card that can be used by the user in possession; therefore, it cannot be blocked if lost or stolen. Its balance expires after two years of inactivity, which can be extended for another year.
- Personalized Tarjeta bip!: It allows bearers to block the card and recover the balance in case of loss, theft, or misplacement. It is personal and non-transferable, and includes a photo, name, and ID number.
- Bank Tarjeta bip!: Associated with a bank account. As of April 2025, only BancoEstado operates this system with CuentaRUT cards.
- Tarjeta Nacional Estudiantil (TNE, Student National Card, school pass): Issued by Junaeb and containing the student's photo, name and school information. This card provides a personal and non-transferable benefit that allows access to reduced fares on transportation modes associated with Red Metropolitana de Movilidad, 24 hours a day, 7 days a week, all year round.
- Senior Citizen Metro Card (TAM Metro): Card issued for people over 65 years old, which allows reduced fare only on Metro de Santiago network. As of April 2025, the reduced fare with this card is CLP 250.
- Senior Citizen Tarjeta bip! (TAM or TAM Intermodal): Card issued for people over 65 years old, which allows reduced fare through all Red Metropolitana de Movilidad services. As of April 2025, the reduced fare with this card is CLP 370.

==== Collectible cards ====
In September 2010, for the Bicentennial of Chile, the sale of the "first collectible card" for Transantiago was announced. It featured the Chilean flag waving against a background of white clouds, shaded in light blue. The card cost CLP 2,000 and was available only at the busiest metro stations. This card was issued in 50,000 units and is equivalent to a standard (non-personalized) Tarjeta bip!.

Since then, numerous bip! cards have been launched with various designs, generally related to commemorations, events taking place in the country, etc. They have the same value as a standard Tarjeta bip!. These collectible Bip! cards are usually sold at Santiago Metro ticket offices (with the notable exception of Lines 3 and 6, which are self-service). Some of the events that have their own Tarjeta bip! are the 2015 Copa América, the 2014 South American Games, the Lollapalooza Chile festival, the Santiago Marathon, the anniversary of the Santiago Metro, the inauguration of lines 3 and 6, the 2023 Pan American Games, International LGBT Pride Day in 2024, cultural or civic events, among others. Collectible bip! cards have also been launched for the premiere of some films in Chile, such as Bohemian Rhapsody, Dragon Ball Super: Broly and Detective Pikachu, among others.

Starting in October 2024, Santiago Metro launched a series of 13 commemorative bip cards on a monthly basis to celebrate the 50th anniversary of the service. The design of the latest card was chosen through an art competition, with the theme "The Metro You Imagine".

=== Cuenta Bip!QR ===
Started in 2022, is a system that allows the fare payment through QR codes. It can be created for free with Clave Única in the RED App and can be recharged automatically or topped-up as needed (minimum load: $100 and maximum: $50,000). To pay for the trip, the user must generate the QR code in the RED App and hold it up to the validator's reader.

== See also ==
- Red Metropolitana de Movilidad
