= Calle 7 season 1 =

Calle 7
- Season 1
- Starring: Martín Cárcamo

Release
- Original network: TVN
- Original release: March 2 – July 31, 2009

Season chronology
- Next → Season 2

The first season of Calle 7 was premiered on March 2, 2009, and the competition started on March 8, 2009. On Mondays and Wednesdays the two teams compete with each other during three contests with a point system of 100, 200 and 300 points deciding the winner, while on Tuesdays and Thursdays, the losing team from the previous day has to nominate one candidate for the final day of elimination on that week's Friday. Also Jean Philippe Cretton became part of the program as the host of Calle 7 onLine.

The Final was on July 31, 2009 having 15 points of rating with a peak of 23 points. Francisco "Chapu" Puelles was the winner winning 5 million chilean pesos (US$9,500), Valentina Roth, who get the second place, obtain 500,000 chilean pesos (US$930). Felipe Camus obtain a symbolic prize for being "Best Teammate" of the program and Francisco "Chapu" Puelles who get the big final prize also obtain the prize "Calle 7 Spirit" for being the best to represent the values that the program wants to give, as good competition and friendship.

== Teams ==
Yellow team
Player	Eliminated
(Chile) Francisco "Chapu" Puelles	Winner
(Argentina) Daniel Fernández	^{[a]}6th and 21st Eliminated
(Chile) Belén Muñoz	20th Eliminated
(Chile) Constanza Vivas	^{[b]}9th and 19th Eliminated
(Chile) Gianella Marengo	18th Eliminated
(Chile) Valeria Ortega	Quit
(Uruguay) Laura Prieto	^{[c]}12th and 17th Eliminated
(Chile) Alain Soulat	16th Eliminated
(Chile) Felipe Camus	^{[d]}8th and 15th Eliminated
(Chile) Nicolás Oyarzún	Quit
(Chile) Mara Curotto	Quit
(Chile) Camila Nash	Quit
(Chile) Camila Stuardo	Quit
(Chile) Javiera Tapia	Quit

Red team
Player	Eliminated
(Chile) Valentina Roth	2nd Place
(Chile) Francisco "Pancho" Rodríguez	3rd Place
(Chile) Nelson Mauricio Pacheco	4th Place
(Chile) Ronny "Dance" Munizaga	Quit
(Argentina) Noelia Gramajo	^{[e]}5th and 14th Eliminated
(Venezuela) Valentina Arce	13th Eliminated
(Chile) Paola Torres	11th Eliminated
(Chile) Iair Motles	10th Eliminated
(Chile) Juan Pablo Alfonso	7th Eliminated
(Chile) Verónica Roberts	4th Eliminated and Quit
(Chile) Paz Gómez	3rd Eliminated
(Chile) Camila Lobos	2nd Eliminated
(Chile) Felipe Arancibia	1st Eliminated

^{^[a]} due to an injury that lasted for more than two days, he gave his place to Daniel Fernández
^{^[a]} due to medical reasons that lasted for more than two days, she gave his place to Constanza Vivas
^{^[c]} entered due to winning by public support
^{^[d]} entered due to winning the repechaje on points
^{^[e]} joined due to a decision of the winner of elimination between Yellow and Red (Francisco Rodriguez Prat)

== Teams competition ==
Week	Immunity	1st Nominated	2nd Nominated	3rd Nominated	4th Nominated	Extra nominated	Saved	Eliminated
March 9 — 13	Not Immunity	Felipe Arancibia	Camila Lobos	Iair Motles	Juan Pablo Alfonso	—	Not Saved	Felipe Arancibia
March 16 — 20	Belén Muñoz	Felipe Camus	Daniel Fernández	Iair Motles	Noelia Gramajo	Camila Lobos	Felipe Camus	Camila Lobos
March 23 — 27	—	Paz Gómez nominated by Valentina R.	Francisco "Pancho" Rodríguez nominated by Noelia	Daniel Fernández nominated by Felipe C.	Belén Muñoz nominated by Gianella	—	Belén Muñoz	Paz Gómez
March 30 — April 3	Gianella Marengo	Verónica Roberts nominated by Valentina R.	Juan Pablo Alfonso nominated by Pancho	Nelson Mauricio Pacheco nominated by Pancho	Francisco "Pancho" Rodríguez nominated by Iair	—	Francisco "Pancho" Rodríguez	^{[b]}Verónica Roberts
April 6 — 10	—	Belén Muñoz nominated by Gianella	Constanza Vivas nominated by Chapu	Noelia Gramajo nominated by Pancho	Juan Pablo Alfonso nominated by Valentina R.	—	Belén Muñoz	Noelia Gramajo
April 13 — 17	Francisco "Pancho" Rodríguez	Laura Prieto nominated by Belén	Valeria Ortega nominated by Chapu	Francisco "Chapu" Puelles nominated by Mara	Gianella Marengo nominated by Belén	Daniel Fernández	Chapu and Laura	Daniel Fernández
April 20 — 24	Valentina Roth	Valeria Ortega nominated by Gianella	Laura Prieto nominated by Chapu	Francisco "Pancho" Rodríguez nominated by Juan Pablo	Juan Pablo Alfonso nominated by Pancho	—	Laura Prieto	Juan Pablo Alfonso
April 27 — May 1	Gianella Marengo	Francisco "Chapu" Puelles nominated by Laura	Felipe Camus nominated by Chapu	Iair Motles nominated by Pancho	Valentina Arce nominated by Pancho	—	Francisco "Chapu" Puelles	Felipe Camus
May 4 — 08	Valentina Roth	Laura Prieto nominated by Belén	Valeria Ortega nominated by Constanza	Belén Muñoz GM nominated by Chapu	Constanza Vivas nominated by Belén	—	Valeria Ortega	Constanza Vivas
May 11 — 15	Valentina Roth	Gianella Marengo nominated by Belén	Laura Prieto nominated by Chapu	^{[a]}Paola Torres nominated by Pancho	Valentina Arce and Iair Motles nominated by Pancho	—	Laura Prieto	Iair Motles
May 18 — 22	Francisco "Chapu" Puelles	Valentina Arce nominated by Ronny	Ronny "Dance" Munizaga nominated by Nelson	Alain Soulat nominated by Gianella	Valeria Ortega nominated by Gianella	Paola Torres	Valeria Ortega	Paola Torres
May 25 — 29	—	Belén Muñoz nominated by Gianella	Gianella Marengo nominated by Chapu	Valeria Ortega nominated by Chapu	Laura Prieto nominated by Valeria	—	Belén Muñoz	Laura Prieto
June 8 — 12	Francisco "Pancho" Rodríguez	Francisco "Chapu" Puelles nominated by Alain	Alain Soulat nominated by Ronny	Valentina Arce nominated by Noelia	Noelia Gramajo nominated by Valeria	—	Francisco "Chapu" Puelles	Valentina Arce
June 15 — 19	—	Alain Soulat nominated by Felipe	Valeria Ortega nominated by Valentina R.	Nelson Mauricio Pacheco nominated by Ronny	Noelia Gramajo nominated by Chapu	—	Valeria Ortega	Noelia Gramajo
June 22 — 26	—	Felipe Camus nominated by Chapu	Valeria Ortega nominated by Valentina R.	Francisco "Chapu" Puelles nominated by Belén	—	—	Valeria Ortega	Felipe Camus
June 29 — July 3	—	Belén Muñoz nominated by Gianella	Laura Prieto nominated by Ronny	Alain Soulat nominated by Chapu	—	—	Laura Prieto	Alain Soulat

^{^[a]} not compete for lesion
^{^[a]} Nicolás Oyarzún gave his place

== Individual competition ==
Week	1st Nominated	2nd Nominated	3rd Nominated	4th Nominated	Winner of the Week	Saved	Winner	Eliminated
July 6 — 10	Gianella Marengo	Belén Muñoz	Valentina Roth	Laura Prieto	Francisco "Chapu" Puelles	Valentina Roth	Gianella Marengo	Laura Prieto
July 13 — 17	Nelson Mauricio Pacheco	Gianella Marengo	Francisco "Pancho" Rodríguez	Constanza Vivas	Francisco "Chapu" Puelles	Constanza Vivas	Francisco "Pancho" Rodríguez	Gianella Marengo
July 20 — 24	Constanza Vivas	Belén Muñoz	Francisco "Chapu" Puelles	Nelson Mauricio Pacheco	—	—	Francisco "Chapu" Puelles	Constanza Vivas

Final Week	1st Eliminated	2nd Eliminated	3rd Eliminated	4th Eliminated	Finalists	Grand Prize Winner
July 27 — 31	Belén Muñoz	Daniel Fernández	Nelson Mauricio Pacheco	Francisco "Pancho" Rodríguez	Francisco "Chapu" Puelles; Valentina Roth	Francisco "Chapu" Puelles

^{^[a]} sent by the public to the big final

== Elimination order ==
Contestants	Original Team	Weeks																						
Contestants	Original Team	1	2	3	4	5	6	7	8	9	10	11	12	13	14	15	16	17	18	19	20	21	SF	F
Francisco P.	Yellow	IN	IN	IN	IN	IN	LOW	IN	LOW	IN	IN	IN	IN	LOW	IN	LOW	IN	IN	IN	IN	LOW	IN	-	"WINNER"
Valentina R.	Red			IN	IN	IN	IN	IN	IN	IN	IN	IN	IN	IN	IN	IN	IN	LOW	IN	IN	IN	IN	WIN	2nd
Francisco R.	Red			LOW	LOW	IN	IN	LOW	IN	IN	IN	IN	IN	IN	IN	IN	IN	IN	LOW	IN	IN	IN	OUT	
Nelson	Red				LOW	IN	IN	IN	IN	IN	IN	IN	IN	IN	LOW	IN	IN	IN	LOW	LOW	IN	IN	OUT	
Daniel	Yellow	IN	LOW	LOW	IN	IN	OUT												IN	IN	IN	OUT		
Belén	Yellow	IN	IN	LOW	IN	LOW	IN	IN	IN	IN	IN	IN	LOW	IN	IN	IN	LOW	LOW	IN	LOW	OUT			
Constanza	Yellow	IN	IN	IN	IN	LOW	IN	IN	IN	OUT								IN	LOW	OUT				
Gianella	Yellow	IN	IN	IN	IN	IN	LOW	IN	IN	IN	LOW	IN	LOW	IN	IN	IN	IN	LOW	OUT					
Laura	Yellow	IN	IN	IN	IN	IN	LOW	LOW	IN	LOW	LOW	IN	OUT	IN	IN	IN	LOW	OUT						
Valeria	Yellow	IN	IN	IN	IN	IN	LOW	LOW	IN	LOW	IN	LOW	LOW	IN	LOW	LOW	IN	QUIT						
Ronny	Red						IN	IN	IN	IN	IN	LOW	IN	IN	IN	IN	IN	QUIT						
Alain	Yellow										IN	LOW	IN	LOW	LOW	IN	OUT							
Felipe C.	Yellow	IN	LOW	IN	IN	IN	IN	IN	OUT				IN	IN	IN	OUT								
Noelia	Red	IN	LOW	IN	IN	OUT							IN	LOW	OUT									
Valentina A.	Red							IN	LOW	IN	LOW	LOW	IN	OUT										
Paola	Red										LOW	OUT												
Iair	Red	LOW	LOW	IN	IN	IN	IN	IN	LOW	IN	OUT													
Verónica	Red				LOW	IN	INJURY	INJURY	INJURY	INJURY	QUIT													
Mara	Yellow	IN	IN	IN	IN	IN	IN	IN	IN	QUIT														
Juan Pablo	Red	LOW	IN	IN	LOW	LOW	IN	OUT																
Javiera	Yellow	IN	IN	IN	IN	IN	IN	QUIT																
Nicolás	Yellow	IN	IN	IN	QUIT																			
Paz	Red	IN	IN	OUT																				
Camila L.	Red	LOW	OUT																					
Felipe A.	Red	OUT																						
Camila N.	Yellow	QUIT																						
Camila S.	Yellow	QUIT																						
