= Chilean peso (1817–1960) =

Currency of Chile (1817-1960)

peso chileno (Spanish)

Unit
- Symbol: $

Denominations
- Superunit
- 10: cóndor
- Subunit
- 1/100: centavo

Demographics
- Date of introduction: 9 June 1817
- Replaced: Spanish real
- Date of withdrawal: 1 January 1960
- Replaced by: Chilean escudo
- User(s): Chile

Issuance
- Central bank: Banco Central de Chile (1925-1960)
- Website: www.bcentral.cl
- Mint: Casa de Moneda
- Website: www.cmoneda.cl
- This infobox shows the latest status before this currency was rendered obsolete.

The Chilean peso (symbol: $) was the legal tender of Chile from 1817 until 1960, when it was replaced by the escudo, a currency that was itself replaced in 1975 by a new peso.

It was established in 1817, together with the country's independence, and in 1851 the decimal system was established in the peso, which was made up of 100 centavos. It remained legal tender in Chile until 1 January 1960, when it was replaced by the escudo. It was manufactured by the Mint of Chile (1743) and regulated by the Central Bank of Chile (1925), in charge of controlling the amount of money in circulation.

== History ==
Although the adoption of the peso to replace the colonial real dates back to 1817, with the beginning of the New Fatherland period, the Spanish currency system continued to be used, in which 8 reales were equal to 1 peso and 16 reales to 1 escudo. In 1835, copper coins denominated in centavos were introduced, but it was not until 1851 that the real and escudo denominations ceased to be issued and new issues in centavos and diezmos (worth 10 centavos) began. The custom of using the old Spanish monetary system persisted in Chile until January 9, 1851, when the decimal system was adopted by law, in which 1 peso was made up of 10 diezmos or 100 centavos.

Also in 1851, the peso was set at 5 French francs, or 22.5 grams of pure silver. However, gold coins were issued to a different standard than in France, with 1 peso equal to 1.37 grams of gold (5 francs equaled 1.45 grams of gold). A gold standard was adopted in 1885, pegging the peso to the British pound sterling at a rate of 13+1/3 pesos = 1 pound (1 peso = 1 shilling and 6 pence); this was reduced in 1926 to 40 pesos = 1 pound (1 peso = 6 pence).

In 1925, money circulation was controlled by the newly created Central Bank of Chile. The Monetary Law, published in the Official Gazette on September 16 of that year, established the peso as containing 6 pence of gold and that 10 peso units would constitute "one condor"; It was also established that every coin of 10 pesos or more would have its value in pesos stamped in letters and numbers, and its equivalent in condors in smaller letters.

Beginning in 1932, the value of the peso began to gradually decline, and by the 1940s, inflation began to increase rapidly; as a result, Law 11885 of September 15, 1955, established that all obligations would be paid in whole pesos, without cents.

In the context of a policy of national economic sanitation and inflationary control undertaken by the government of Jorge Alessandri, between 1960 and 1975 the peso was replaced by the escudo (Eº). The conversion rate was 1000 pesos for 1 escudo.

== Coins ==
Between 1817 and 1851, silver coins were issued in denominations of 1/4, 1/2, 1, and 2 reales and 1 peso (also denominated 8 reales), with gold coins for 1, 2, 4, and 8 escudos. In 1835, copper 1/2 and 1 centavo coins were issued. A full decimal coinage was introduced between 1851 and 1853, consisting of copper 1/2 and 1 centavo, silver 1/2 and 1 décimo (5 and 10 centavos), 20 and 50 centavos, and 1 peso, and gold 5 and 10 pesos. In 1860, gold 1 peso coins were introduced, followed by cupronickel 1/2, 1 and 2 centavos between 1870 and 1871. Copper coins for these denominations were reintroduced between 1878 and 1883, with copper 2 1/2 centavos added in 1886. A new gold coinage was introduced in 1895, reflecting the lower gold standard, with coins for 2, 5, 10 and 20 pesos. In 1896, the 1/2 and 1 décimo were replaced by 5 and 10 centavo coins.

In 1907, a short-lived, silver 40 centavo coin was introduced following cessation of production of the 50 centavo coin. In 1919, the last of the copper coins (1 and 2 centavos) were issued. The following year, cupronickel replaced silver in the 5, 10 and 20 centavo coins. A final gold coinage was introduced in 1926, in denominations of 20, 50 and 100 pesos. In 1927, silver 2 and 5 peso coins were issued. Cupronickel 1 peso coins were introduced in 1933, replacing the last of the silver coins. In 1942, copper 20 and 50 centavos and 1 peso coins were introduced. The last coins of the first peso were issued between 1954 and 1959. These were aluminum 1, 5 and 10 pesos.

Gold bullion coins with nominals in 100 pesos were minted between 1932 and 1980 (i.e. they survived into the periods of two later currencies). In addition, there was a special issue of gold coins (100, 200 and 500 pesos) in 1968.

Coins issued in values of 5 and 10 pesos from 1956 onwards, as well as bullion coins of 20, 50 and 100 pesos issued from 1925 to 1980 (exceeding the validity of this monetary standard by 20 years) also bring such equivalence in condors, being 10 pesos per condor.

== Banknotes ==
The first Chilean paper money was issued between 1840 and 1844 by the treasury of the province of Valdivia, in denominations of 4 and 8 reales. In the 1870s, a number of private banks began issuing paper money, including the Banco Agrícola, the Banco de la Alianza, the Banco de Concepción, the Banco Consolidado de Chile, the Banco de A. Edwards y Cía., the Banco de Escobar, Ossa y Cía., the Banco Mobiliario, the Banco Nacional de Chile, the Banco del Pobre, the Banco Sud Americano, the Banco del Sur, the Banco de la Unión, and the Banco de Valparaíso. Others followed in the 1880s and 1890s. Denominations included 1, 2, 5, 10, 20, 50, 100, and 500 pesos. One bank, the Banco de A. Edwards y Cía., also issued notes denominated in pounds sterling (libra esterlina).

In 1881, the government issued paper money convertible into silver or gold, in denominations of 1, 2, 5, 10, 20, 50, 100, and 1000 pesos. 50 centavo notes were added in 1891 and 500 pesos in 1912. In 1898, provisional issues were made by the government, consisting of private bank notes overprinted with the words "Emisión Fiscal". This marked the end of the production of private paper money.

In 1925, the Banco Central de Chile began issuing notes. The first, in denominations of 5, 10, 50, 100, and 1000 pesos, were overprints on government notes. In 1927, notes marked as "Billete Provisional" were issued in denominations of 5, 10, 50, 100, 500, and 1000 pesos. Regular were introduced between 1931 and 1933, in denominations of 1, 5, 10, 20, 50, 100, 500, 1000, 5000, and 10,000 pesos. The 1 and 20 peso notes stopped production in 1943 and 1947, respectively. The remaining denominations continued production until 1959, with a 50,000-peso note added in 1958.

Notes issued after 1925 show the equivalence in condors, which was at the rate of 10 pesos per condor. The following are the banknotes issued since 1932:

Denomination	Issue	Color	Dimensions	Obverse
Denomination	Issue	Color	Dimensions	Back
1 peso 1/10 cóndor (provisional)	1932-1942	Blue/yellow	120 × 60 mm	Denomination and Central Bank of Chile seal.
1 peso 1/10 cóndor (provisional)	1932-1942	Blue/yellow	120 × 60 mm	Denomination and letter from the series.
1 peso 1/10 cóndor (provisional)	1943	Blue/yellow	88 × 51 mm	Denomination and Central Bank of Chile seal.
1 peso 1/10 cóndor (provisional)	1943	Blue/yellow	88 × 51 mm	Denomination and letter from the series.
5 pesos ½ cóndor	1932-1959	Blue	145 × 70 mm	Portrait of Bernardo O'Higgins.
5 pesos ½ cóndor	1932-1959	Blue	145 × 70 mm	Denomination.
10 pesos 1 cóndor	1932-1959	Reddish brown	145 × 70 mm	Portrait of Manuel Bulnes.
10 pesos 1 cóndor	1932-1959	Reddish brown	145 × 70 mm	Denomination.
20 pesos 2 cóndores	1939-1947	Brown	145 × 70 mm	Portrait of Pedro de Valdivia.
20 pesos 2 cóndores	1939-1947	Brown	145 × 70 mm	View of Santa Lucía Hill park.
50 pesos 5 cóndores	1932-1959	Green	145 × 70 mm	Portrait of Aníbal Pinto.
50 pesos 5 cóndores	1932-1959	Green	145 × 70 mm	Denomination.
100 pesos 10 cóndores	1933-1959	Red	145 × 70 mm	Portrait of Arturo Prat.
100 pesos 10 cóndores	1933-1959	Red	145 × 70 mm	Denomination.
500 pesos 50 cóndores	1933-1945	Yellow/brown	180 × 80 mm	Portrait of Manuel Montt.
500 pesos 50 cóndores	1933-1945	Yellow/brown	180 × 80 mm	Llegada de Almagro a Chile ("Almagro arrives in Chile"), by Pedro Subercaseaux.
500 pesos 50 cóndores	1947-1959	Blue	145 × 70 mm	Portrait of Manuel Montt.
500 pesos 50 cóndores	1947-1959	Blue	145 × 70 mm	Llegada de Almagro a Chile ("Almagro arrives in Chile"), by Pedro Subercaseaux.
1000 pesos 100 cóndores	1933-1947	Brown	180 × 80 mm	Portrait of Manuel Blanco Encalada.
1000 pesos 100 cóndores	1933-1947	Brown	180 × 80 mm	Fundación de Santiago ("Foundation of Santiago"), by Pedro Lira.
1000 pesos 100 cóndores	1947-1959	Black	145 × 70 mm	Portrait of Manuel Blanco Encalada.
1000 pesos 100 cóndores	1947-1959	Black	145 × 70 mm	Fundación de Santiago ("Foundation of Santiago"), by Pedro Lira.
5000 pesos 500 cóndores	1932	Orange	200 × 105 mm	Portrait of Manuel Antonio Tocornal.
5000 pesos 500 cóndores	1932	Orange	200 × 105 mm	Denomination
5000 pesos 500 cóndores	1940	Blue	200 × 105 mm	Portrait of Manuel Antonio Tocornal.
5000 pesos 500 cóndores	1940	Blue	200 × 105 mm	Carga de O'Higgins en la Batalla de Rancagua ("O'Higgins' charge at the Battle of Rancagua"), by Pedro Subercaseaux.
5000 pesos 500 cóndores	1947-1959	Brown	175 × 85 mm	Portrait of Manuel Antonio Tocornal.
5000 pesos 500 cóndores	1947-1959	Brown	175 × 85 mm	Carga de O'Higgins en la Batalla de Rancagua ("O'Higgins' charge at the Battle of Rancagua"), by Pedro Subercaseaux.
10,000 pesos 1000 cóndores	1932	Green	200 × 105 mm	Portrait of José Manuel Balmaceda.
10,000 pesos 1000 cóndores	1932	Green	200 × 105 mm	Denomination
10,000 pesos 1000 cóndores	1940	Brown	200 × 105 mm	Portrait of José Manuel Balmaceda.
10,000 pesos 1000 cóndores	1940	Brown	200 × 105 mm	Abrazo de Maipú, by Pedro Subercaseaux.
10,000 pesos 1000 cóndores	1947-1959	Brown/gray	180 × 85 mm	Portrait of José Manuel Balmaceda.
10,000 pesos 1000 cóndores	1947-1959	Brown/gray	180 × 85 mm	Abrazo de Maipú, by Pedro Subercaseaux.
50,000 pesos 5000 cóndores	1959	Green	180 × 85 mm	Portrait of Arturo Alessandri Palma.
50,000 pesos 5000 cóndores	1959	Green	180 × 85 mm	Frontispiece of Central Bank of Chile main building.

== See also ==
- Economic history of Chile

Preceded by: Spanish real	Currency of Chile; 1817 – 1960	Succeeded by: Chilean escudo Ratio: 1 escudo = 1000 pesos
