= Dorsal metro station =

Metro station in Santiago, Chile

Dorsal
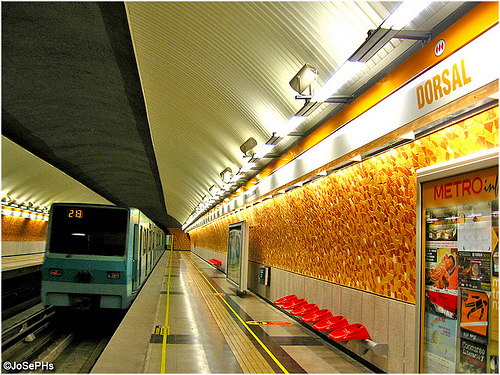

General information
- Location: Recoleta Avenue / Dorsal Avenue
- Coordinates: 33°23′49.23″S 70°38′33.85″W
- System: Santiago rapid transit
- Line: Line 2
- Platforms: 2 side platforms
- Tracks: 2
- Connections: Transantiago buses

Construction
- Accessible: yes

History
- Opened: December 21, 2006

Services
| Preceding station | Santiago Metro | Following station |
|---|---|---|
| Zapadores towards Vespucio Norte | Line 2 | Einstein towards Hospital El Pino |
Location

Dorsal is an underground metro station on the Line 2 of the Santiago Metro, in Santiago, Chile. Along with Vespucio Norte and Zapadores, it was opened on 21 December 2006 Christmas Eve as part of a subway expansion master plan.
