= Zapadores metro station =

Santiago metro station

Zapadores
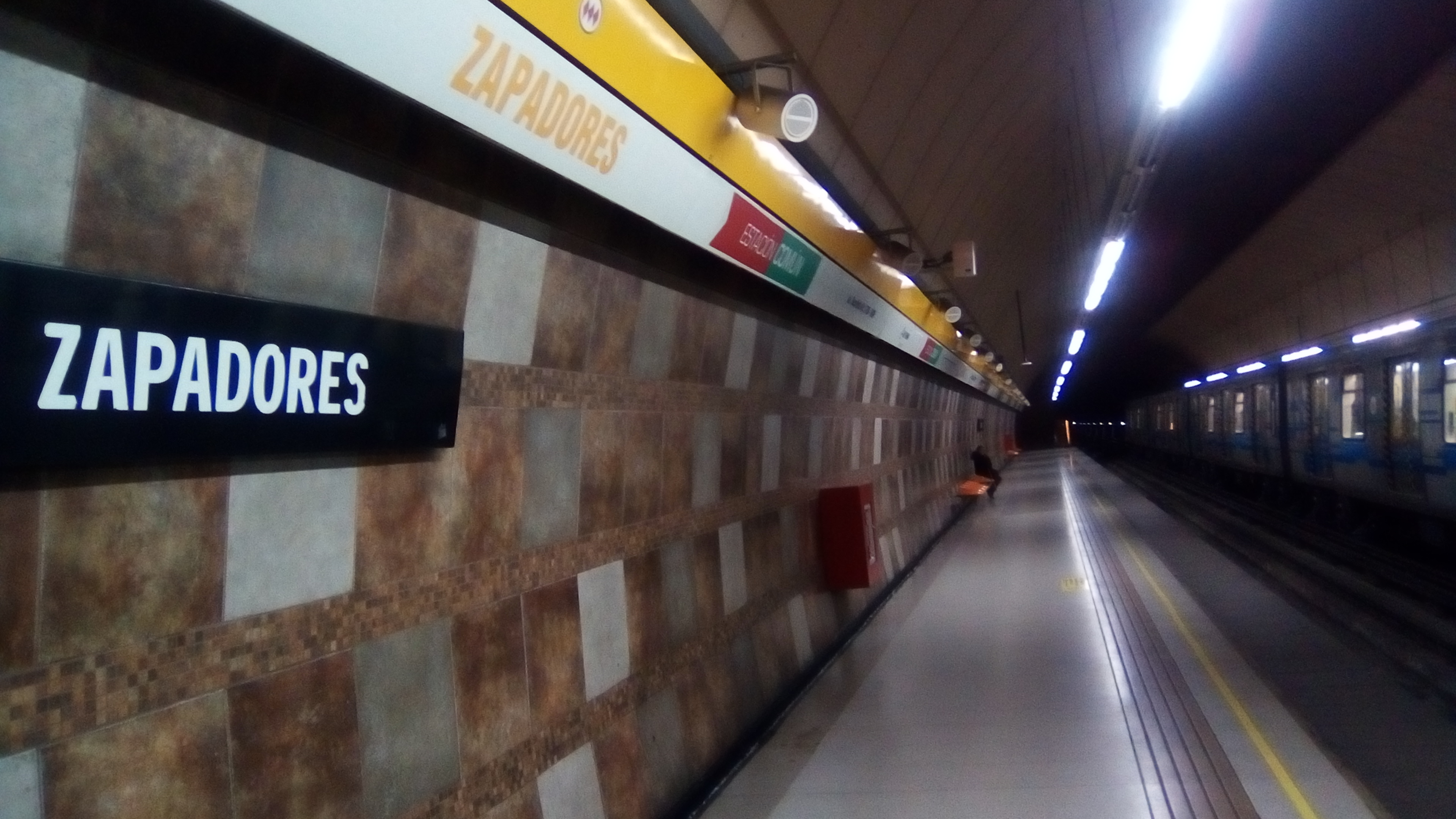

General information
- Location: Recoleta Avenue / Zapadores Avenue
- Coordinates: 33°23′27.21″S 70°38′32.89″W
- System: Santiago rapid transit
- Line: Line 2
- Platforms: 2 side platforms
- Tracks: 2
- Connections: Transantiago buses

Construction
- Accessible: yes

History
- Opened: December 21, 2006

Services
Preceding station	Santiago Metro	Following station
Vespucio Norte Terminus	Line 2	Dorsal towards Hospital El Pino
Location

Zapadores is an underground metro station on the Line 2 of the Santiago Metro, in Santiago, Chile. It is the last northern station of the Line 2 prior to reaching the Vespucio Norte terminus. The station was opened on 21 December 2006 as part of the extension of the line from Einstein to Vespucio Norte.
