= Juan de Dios Correa de Saa =

Chilean politician

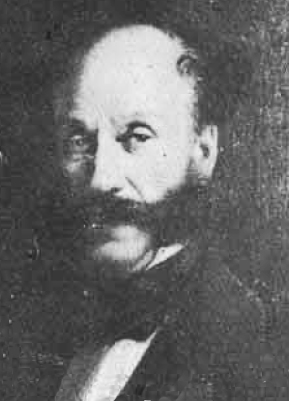

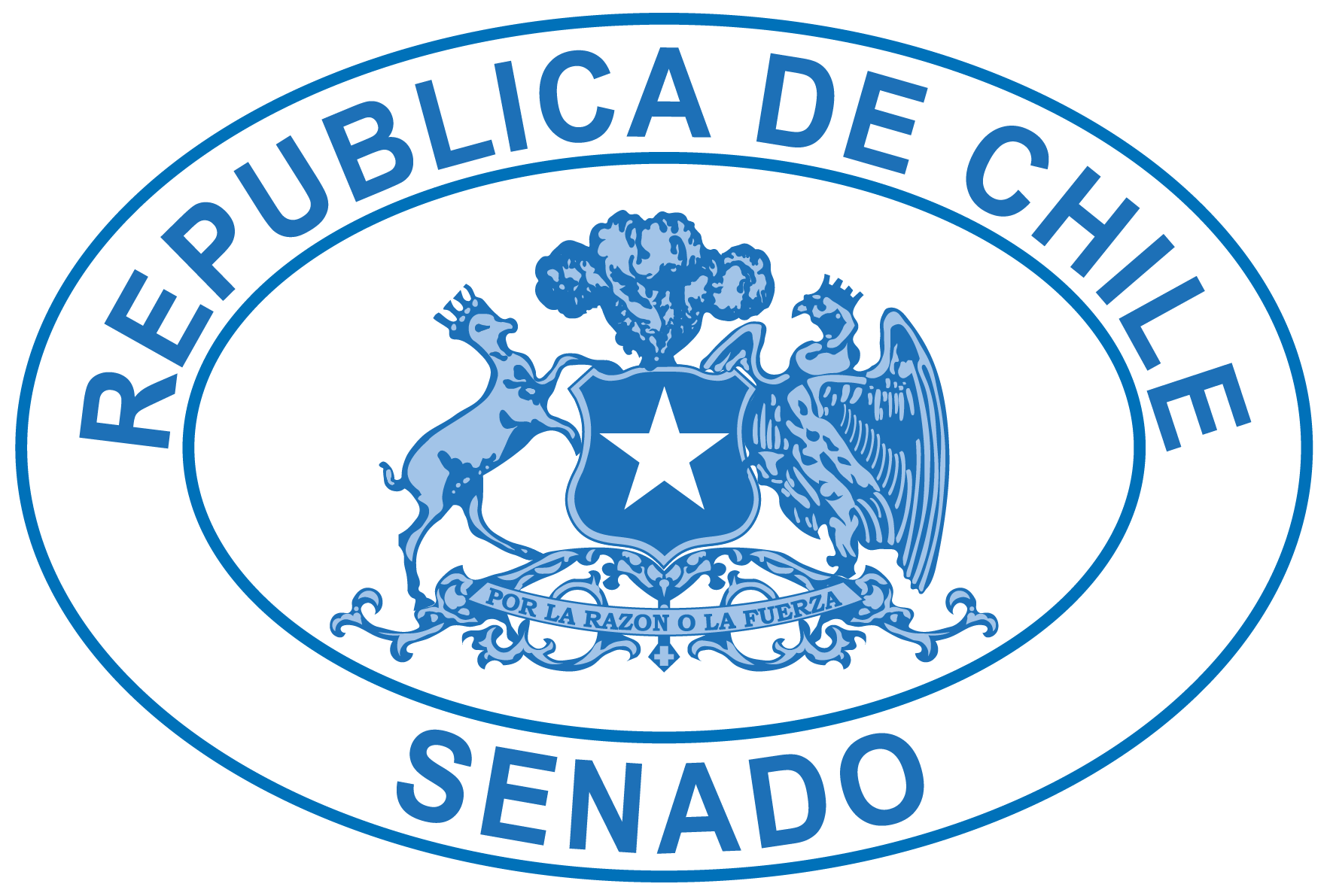
President of the Senate of the Republic of Chile
- In office 7 October 1867 – 27 December 1868
- Preceded by: Manuel Antonio Tocornal
- Succeeded by: Álvaro Covarrubias

Personal details
- Born: 1 January 1801 Santiago, Viceroyalty of Peru
- Died: 1 January 1877 (aged 76) Santiago, Chile
- Party: Conservative Party
- Parent: Rafael Correa de Saa
- Occupation: Politician
- Profession: Military Officer

Juan de Dios Correa de Saa (born 1801–1877) was a Chilean politician and military officer who served as President of the Senate of Chile.
