= Chilean escudo =

Currency of Chile between 1960 and 1975

escudo chileno (Spanish)

Unit
- Symbol: Eº

Denominations
- Subunit
- 1/100: centésimo
- Banknotes: ½, 1, 5, 10, 50, 100, 500, 1000, 5000, 10000 escudos
- Coins: ½, 1, 2, 5, 10, 20, 50 centésimos 1, 5, 10, 50, 100 escudos

Demographics
- Date of introduction: 1 January 1960
- Replaced: Chilean peso
- Date of withdrawal: 29 September 1975
- Replaced by: Chilean peso
- User(s): Chile

Issuance
- Central bank: Banco Central de Chile
- Website: www.bcentral.cl
- Mint: Casa de Moneda
- Website: www.cmoneda.cl
- This infobox shows the latest status before this currency was rendered obsolete.

The escudo was the currency of Chile between 1960 and 1975, divided into 100 centésimos. It replaced the (old) peso at a rate of 1 escudo = 1000 pesos and was itself replaced by a new peso, at a rate of 1 peso = 1000 escudos. The symbol Eº was used for the escudo.

== History ==
Through Law 13,305, published on April 6, 1959, the escudo entered into circulation on January 1, 1960, replacing the old peso. Its equivalence was Eº 1 = $1000 (pesos). The escudo was subdivided into centésimos. As the old banknotes had to be replaced, the Central Bank took the provisional measure of authorizing the overstamping of the existing banknotes of 10, 50, 100, 500, 1,000, 5,000, 10,000 and 50,000 pesos. They had printed in red ink, in the white oval of the watermark on the right side of the back, the equivalent of their value in escudos, according to the exchange rate $1000 = Eº 1. The overstamping of the banknotes began in November 1959.

On December 31, 1973, by decree law 231, it was established that all payments should be made in whole escudos, eliminating the centésimos. Through decree law 1123, published on August 4, 1975, Chile returned to the peso. The equivalence was $1 = Eº 1000.

== Coins ==
In 1960, aluminium 1 centésimo and aluminium-bronze 2, 5 and 10 centésimo coins were introduced, followed by aluminium 1/2 centésimo in 1962. In 1971, a new coinage was introduced, consisting of aluminium-bronze 10, 20 and 50 centésimos and cupro-nickel 1, 2 and 5 escudos. This coinage was issued for two years, with aluminium 5 escudos produced in 1972. In 1974 and 1975, aluminium 10 escudos and nickel-brass 50 and 100 escudos were issued.

Denomination	Issue	Material	Diameter	Obverse	Ref.
Denomination	Issue	Material	Diameter	Reverse	Ref.
1/2 centésimo	1962-1963	Aluminum	25 mm	Condor	
1/2 centésimo	1962-1963	Aluminum	25 mm	Denomination surrounded by two ears of wheat	
1 centésimo	1960-1963	Aluminum	28 mm	Condor	
1 centésimo	1960-1963	Aluminum	28 mm	Denomination surrounded by two ears of wheat	
2 centésimos	1960-1970	Bronze-aluminum	20 mm	Condor	
2 centésimos	1960-1970	Bronze-aluminum	20 mm	Denomination surrounded by two ears of wheat	
5 centésimos	1960-1971	Bronze-aluminum	23.3 mm	Condor	
5 centésimos	1960-1971	Bronze-aluminum	23.3 mm	Denomination surrounded by two ears of wheat	
10 centésimos	1960-1970	Bronze-aluminum	27.2 mm	Condor	
10 centésimos	1960-1970	Bronze-aluminum	27.2 mm	Denomination surrounded by two ears of wheat	
10 centésimos	1971-1972	Bronze-aluminum	18.1 mm	Effigy of Bernardo O'Higgins	
10 centésimos	1971-1972	Bronze-aluminum	18.1 mm	National coat of arms and denomination	
20 centésimos	1971-1972	Bronze-aluminum	20 mm	Effigy of José Manuel Balmaceda	
20 centésimos	1971-1972	Bronze-aluminum	20 mm	National coat of arms and denomination	
50 centésimos	1971-1972	Bronze-aluminum	21.9 mm	Effigy of Manuel Rodríguez Erdoíza	
50 centésimos	1971-1972	Bronze-aluminum	21.9 mm	National coat of arms and denomination	
1 escudo	1971-1972	Nickel silver	18.9 mm	Effigy of José Miguel Carrera	
1 escudo	1971-1972	Nickel silver	18.9 mm	National coat of arms and denomination	
5 escudos	1971-1972	Nickel silver	23 mm	Lautaro riding a horse	
5 escudos	1971-1972	Nickel silver	23 mm	National coat of arms and denomination	
5 escudos	1974	Aluminum	22.8 mm	Lautaro riding a horse	
5 escudos	1974	Aluminum	22.8 mm	National coat of arms and denomination	
10 escudos	1974-1975	Aluminum	24.9 mm	Condor	
10 escudos	1974-1975	Aluminum	24.9 mm	Denomination surrounded by two laurel branches	
50 escudos	1974-1975	Bronze-aluminum	21.5 mm	Condor	
50 escudos	1974-1975	Bronze-aluminum	21.5 mm	Denomination surrounded by two laurel branches	
100 escudos	1974-1975	Bronze-aluminum	23.5 mm	Condor	
100 escudos	1974-1975	Bronze-aluminum	23.5 mm	Denomination surrounded by two laurel branches	

== Banknotes ==
In 1959, provisional banknotes were produced by the Banco Central de Chile. These were modified versions of the old peso notes, with the centésimo or escudo denomination added to the design. Denominations were 1/2, 1, 5, 10 and 50 centésimos, 1, 5, 10 and 50 escudos.

On 22 July 1960, the 1 escudo banknote began to circulate, and on August 1 of the same year the 1/2 escudo banknote entered circulation. In 1962 new designs were introduced, in denominations of 5, 10 and 50 escudos. On 6 September 1968, the 100 escudos note was put into circulation, and in September 1970 a new smaller 10 escudos note was presented. On 7 July 1972, the 500 escudos banknote began to circulate. On 12 July 1973, E° 1000 banknote was introduced, and in November of that same year, after the coup d'état, the Eº 5000 banknote, whose printing had begun at the beginning of September. Finally, in 1974, the denomination of 10,000 escudos was introduced.

Denomination	Issue	Color	Dimensions	Obverse	Ref.
Denomination	Issue	Color	Dimensions	Reverse	Ref.
1/2 escudo 50 centésimos	1960-1971	Blue	145 × 70 mm	Effigy of Bernardo O'Higgins.	
1/2 escudo 50 centésimos	1960-1971	Blue	145 × 70 mm	Arrival of Almagro to Chile, by Pedro Subercaseaux.	
1 escudo	1960-1971	Brown	145 × 70 mm	Effigy of Arturo Prat.	
1 escudo	1960-1971	Brown	145 × 70 mm	Foundation Santiago, by Pedro Lira.	
5 escudos	1963-1971	Reddish brown	145 × 70 mm	Effigy of Manuel Bulnes.	
5 escudos	1963-1971	Reddish brown	145 × 70 mm	Battle of Rancagua, by Pedro Subercaseaux.	
10 escudos	1962-1970	Garnet	178 × 83 mm	Effigy of José Manuel Balmaceda.	
10 escudos	1962-1970	Garnet	178 × 83 mm	Hug of Maipú, by Pedro Subercaseaux.	
10 escudos	1970-1972	Brown	145 × 70 mm	Effigy of José Manuel Balmaceda.	
10 escudos	1970-1972	Brown	145 × 70 mm	Hug of Maipú, by Pedro Subercaseaux.	
10 escudos	1972-1974	Sepia	145 × 70 mm	Effigy of José Manuel Balmaceda.	
10 escudos	1972-1974	Sepia	145 × 70 mm	Hug of Maipú, by Pedro Subercaseaux.	
50 escudos	1962-1974	Green	178 × 83 mm	Effigy of Arturo Alessandri Palma.	
50 escudos	1962-1974	Green	178 × 83 mm	Banco Central de Chile building.	
100 escudos	1967-1974	Blue	178 × 83 mm	Effigy of Manuel Rengifo.	
100 escudos	1967-1974	Blue	178 × 83 mm	Liberating Expedition of Peru, by Thomas Somerscales.	
500 escudos	1971-1975	Carmine rose	145 × 70 mm	Effigy of a miner, on the occasion of the nationalization of copper in 1971.	
500 escudos	1971-1975	Carmine rose	145 × 70 mm	Chuquicamata mine.	
1000 escudos	1973-1975	Purplish blue	145 × 70 mm	Effigy of José Miguel Carrera.	
1000 escudos	1973-1975	Purplish blue	145 × 70 mm	House of the Carrera family.	
5000 escudos	1973-1975	Green	145 × 70 mm	Effigy of José Miguel Carrera.	
5000 escudos	1973-1975	Green	145 × 70 mm	House of the Carrera family.	
10000 escudos	1974-1975	Salmon red	145 × 70 mm	Effigy of Bernardo O'Higgins.	
10000 escudos	1974-1975	Salmon red	145 × 70 mm	Battle of Rancagua, by Pedro Subercaseaux.	

== See also ==
- Economic history of Chile

Preceded by: (Old) Chilean peso Ratio: 1 escudo = 1000 pesos	Currency of Chile; 1960 – 1975	Succeeded by: (New) Chilean peso Ratio: 1 peso = 1000 escudos
