= Manuel Antonio Tocornal =

Chilean politician

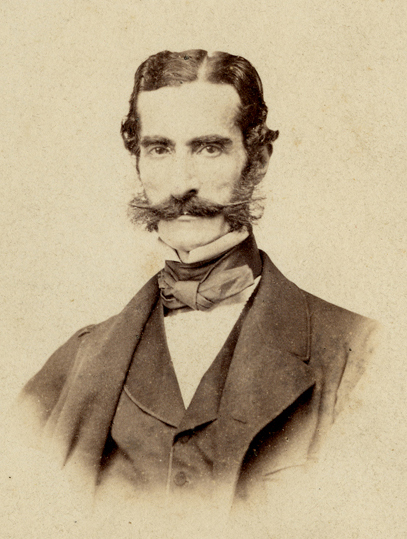

President of the Senate
- In office 3 June 1867 – 15 August 1867
- Preceded by: José Rafael Larraín
- Succeeded by: Juan de Dios Correa de Saa

Personal details
- Born: 12 June 1817 Santiago, Chile
- Died: 15 August 1867 (aged 50) Santiago, Chile
- Party: Conservative Party
- Parent: Joaquín Tocornal
- Education: University of Chile (LL.B)
- Occupation: Politician
- Profession: Lawyer

Manuel Antonio Tocornal Grez (born 12 June 1817 – 15 August 1867) was a Chilean politician who served as President of the Senate of Chile until his death. In 1866–1867, he was rector of the University of Chile.
