= Red Metropolitana de Movilidad =

Public transport system serving Santiago, Chile

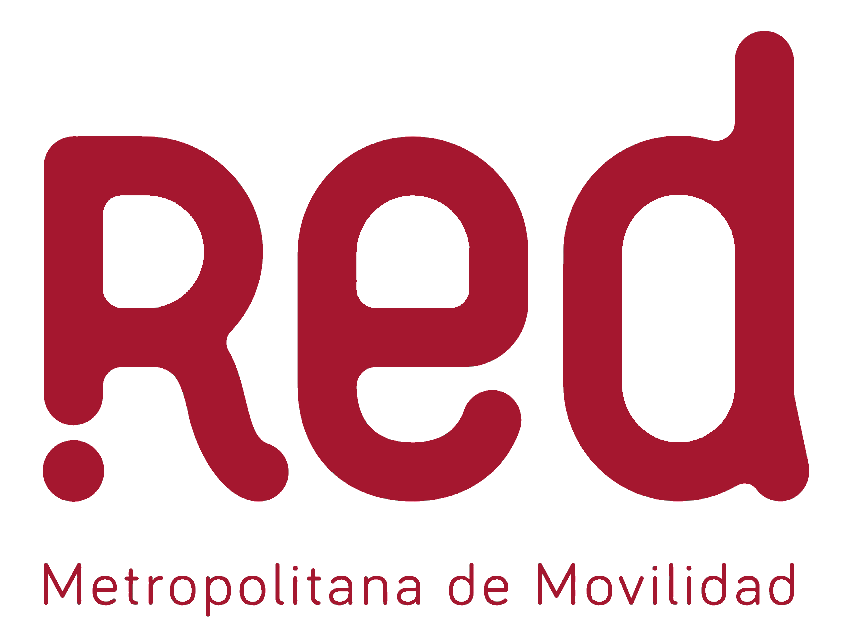

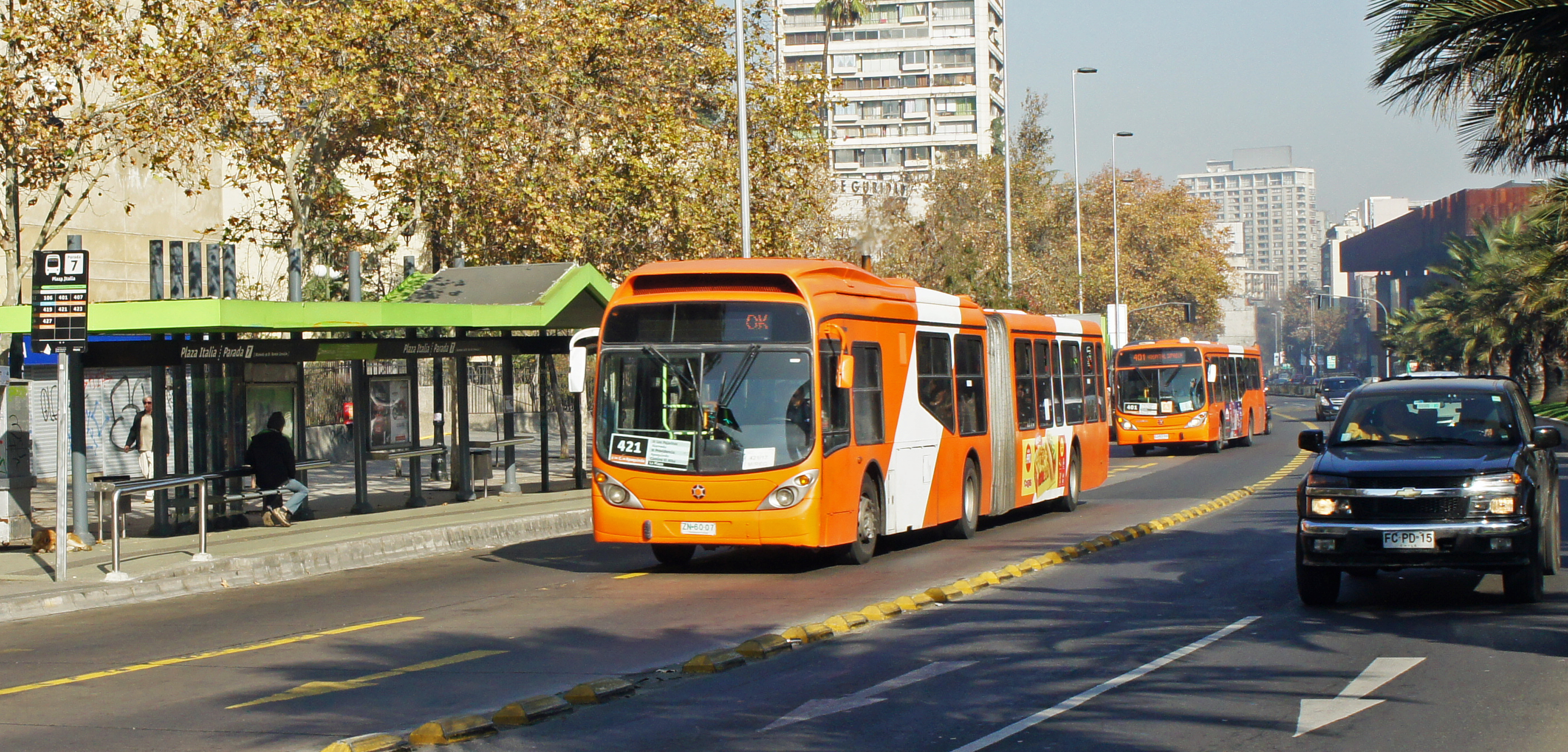
- Formerly: Transantiago
- Founded: 2007
- Headquarters: Santiago de Chile
- Service area: Greater Santiago
- Service type: Public transport
- Routes: 391 bus lines 7 rapid transit lines 1 commuter rail line
- Stations: 11,165 bus stops 108 rapid transit stations 10 commuter rail stations
- Fleet: 6,581 buses 190 metro trains 40 interurban trains
- Daily ridership: Bus: 3,300,000 approx. Metro: 2,700,000 approx. Metrotrén: 1,200,000 approx.
- Operator: Inversiones Alsacia; Subus Chile; Buses Vule S.A. Express de Santiago Uno; Metrobus; Veolia Redbus Urbano; STP Santiago S.A. Metro S.A. Tren Central
- Website: red.cl

Red Metropolitana de Movilidad (English: Metropolitan Mobility Network; named Transantiago until March 2019) is a public transport system that serves Santiago, the capital of Chile. It is considered the most ambitious transport reform undertaken by a developing country according to the World Resources Institute.

The system, largely influenced by Bogotá, Colombia's TransMilenio and Curitiba, Brazil's RIT, was introduced on February 10, 2007. It standardized bus routes and eliminated redundancy of same; redundancies were commonplace in the old system, which was run by thousands of independent bus operators. The system combines local (feeder) bus lines, main bus lines and the Metro (subway) network. It includes an integrated fare system, which allows passengers to make bus-to-bus or bus-to-metro transfers for the price of one ticket, using a single contactless smart card.

Transantiago's implementation was problematic, as the decreased bus fleet and the newer routes have proved insufficient to properly serve a population inadequately informed of pending changes. The major complaints are the lack of buses and their inconsistent frequencies, missing or poor infrastructure (such as segregated corridors, prepaid areas and bus stops), the network's coverage, and the number of transfers needed for longer trips. As a result, users have overcrowded the Metro, which is generally held to be fast and dependable.

== Details ==
Transantiago's first stage of implementation began on October 22, 2005, when a group of ten new companies took control of the capital's bus system, immediately introducing 1,181 new, modern low-floor buses (approximately half of them being articulated) made by Volvo in Brazil, replacing 461 yellow-colored buses from the old system. The new buses will temporarily run alongside the over 7,000 existing older buses that will be gradually removed from the system until 2010. In October 2006, a users' information system was introduced.

Transantiago became fully operational on February 10, 2007, with the introduction of a new route system dividing bus lines into two complementary groups: main and local lines. In addition, a new fare structure was implemented, allowing transfers at small or zero fares between buses and metro, when using the new contactless smartcard. 1,776 new buses will operate at this stage. The older yellow-colored (now painted over) buses will only operate through the secondary local lines in conjunction with new but simpler buses. It is expected that by 2010, the older buses will be completely replaced by over 4,600 new vehicles.

=== Objectives ===
- Encouraging the use of public transport
- Enhancing the quality of public transport, eliminating the on-the-street competition and replacing the existing bus fleet
- Palliating the city's high air and sound pollution levels by reducing the number of buses from over 7,000 to about 4,600, and by reducing the emission levels of the buses
- Reducing travel times

=== New lines structure ===
Bus services were divided into two subsystems. The first subsystem corresponds to the main bus lines, which complementing the metro network allow long trips between different zones of the city. The second subsystem corresponds to the local (or feeder) bus lines, which allow short trips and feed the metro and main bus lines. Local services are organized in ten units, each corresponding to one or more municipalities of Santiago.

A	Santiago Centro
B	Conchalí, Huechuraba, Independencia, Quilicura, Recoleta, Renca
C	Las Condes, Lo Barnechea, Providencia, Vitacura
D	La Reina, Macul, Ñuñoa, Peñalolén
E	La Florida, La Granja
F	Puente Alto
G	El Bosque, La Cisterna, La Pintana, San Bernardo, San Ramón
H	Lo Espejo, Pedro Aguirre Cerda, San Joaquín, San Miguel
I	Cerrillos, Estación Central, Maipú
J	Cerro Navia, Lo Prado, Pudahuel, Quinta Normal

Map of the zones of Transantiago

In June 2012, the scheme of local and trunk services was disbanded. The requirement to have each business unit with different companies was eliminated and the relationship between these tours are encouraged, in order to provide better service to passengers by reducing transfers. From that moment seven operating units, each assigned to a concessionaire which included both trunk and local services were generated. The buses are painted, according to Business Unit won each company, which is identified by a specific color. In this way, the color of the buses does not represent the zone covering the system as stipulated in the beginning and remained until June 2012.

U1	Alsacia	Servicios 100
U2	Subus Chile	Servicios 200 y G
U3	Buses Vule	Servicios 300, E, H e I
U4	Express de Santiago Uno	Servicios 400 y D
U5	Metbus	Servicios 500 y J
U6	Veolia Redbus Urbano	Servicios B y C
U7	S.T.P. Santiago	Servicios F

The details of both the main bus lines and the local bus lines can be seen in the official .

=== New fare structure ===
An integrated fares scheme was introduced for buses and metro, allowing to transfer for free or paying a small transfer charge. During the first six months of operation, up to three transfers are completely free. The definitive fare scheme considers two basic fares (local and main fares), in addition to the transfer fares.

The local fare will allow local trips inside a local area, also allowing free transfers between local services in that area. The main fare will be a little higher and will allow trips both in the main bus lines and metro, including free transfers between them. Finally, a transfer fare will have to be paid when transferring between a main bus service (or metro) and a local service. This transfer fare will be much smaller than the basic fares. As before, students will be allowed to pay reduced fares, at 35% of the normal ones.

Fares will be adjusted periodically, according to the changes in the main input prices (fuel, etc.) of the operators. The way in which the fare adjustments is calculated has been established in the operation contracts. Therefore, neither operators nor the authorities are able to change the fares at will.

=== Payment and financial administration ===
The main payment system of Transantiago is a Contactless smart card called Tarjeta bip! similar to the Multivía card, which was previously operated by the metro. This card is used both in buses and metro as a prepaid card. The access to the reduced or free transfer fares is only possible when using this card, as the electronic system associated to the card automatically recognizes if users are starting their trip or just making a transfer. In this way, the system can determine whether the basic fare is to be charged or if a transfer or free fare applies. Passengers who do not have the card may pay in cash (only in feeder buses), but at a higher fare and without possibility of reduced transfers.

The operation of the payment system was tendered to a private company. Its main tasks are the distribution and charging of the card, the administration of the revenues and the payment to the operators, according to the rules established in the contracts.

=== User information ===
Another component of the system is the information manager and users' information provider, which was tendered and awarded to the private company Tata Consultancy Services Chile in 2007. Its main tasks are: provide information for the users both before and after the implementation of the system, provide information about the localization of the buses to the operators and coordinate emergencies with the relevant bodies.

== Vehicles ==
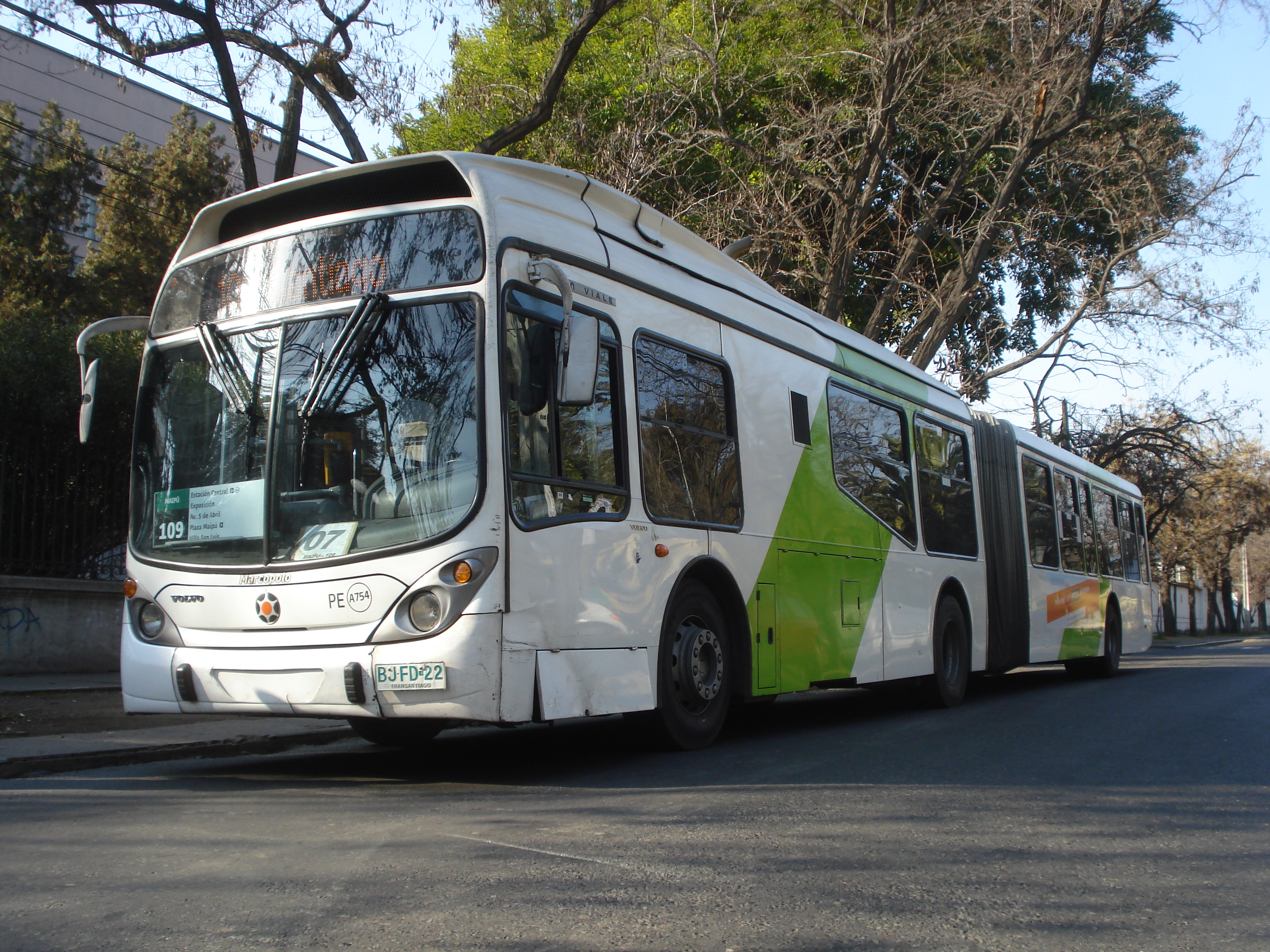
A Transantiago system articulated bus with the initial livery.

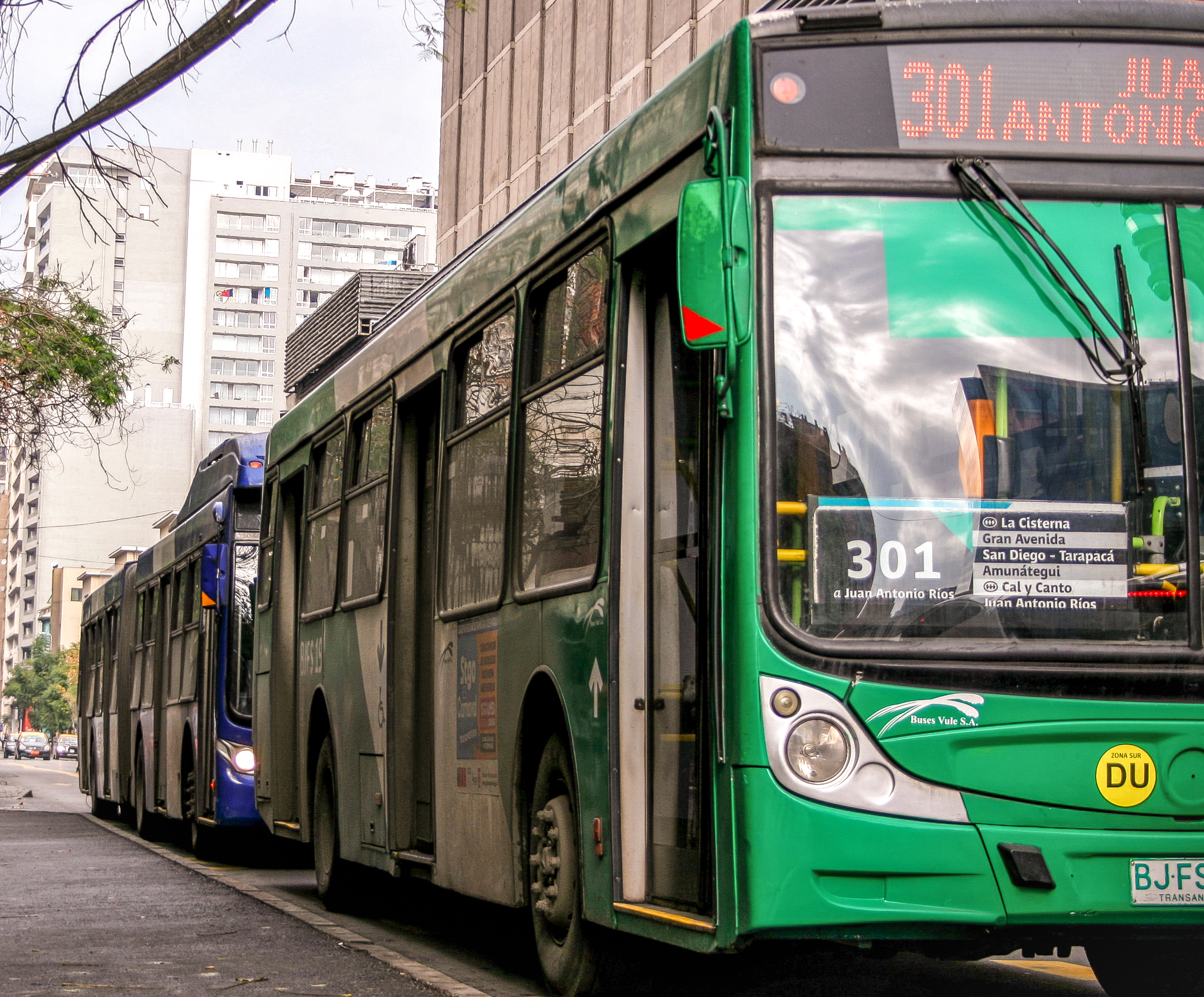
301 bus, operated by Buses Vule S.A with the new livery

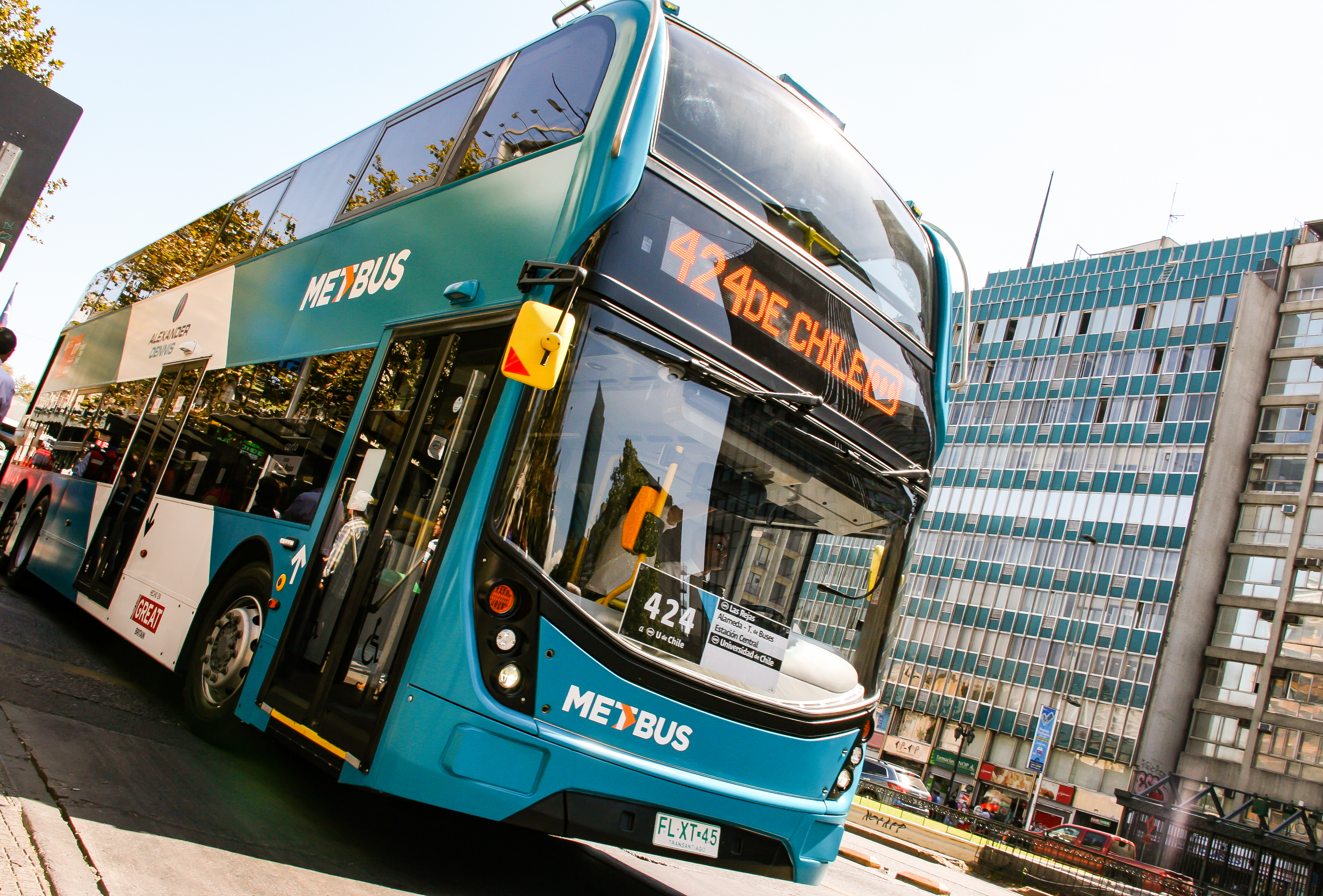
Double-decker bus tested in 2017, looking onward the 2018 contracts

In comparison to the old buses of Santiago, at least half the new ones have a low floor, and all have a blocking system that does not allow the bus to move before all doors are closed (Although the latter doesn't always work, since there have been many cases of people almost falling down the bus). Since 2003, all new buses in Santiago fulfill the emission norm Euro III.

After the implementation of the new lines structure, the main bus lines will be operated with articulated (18 meters long) and normal buses, while the local services will be operated with normal buses and minibuses.

=== Technical characteristics ===
Most of the low-floor buses for Transantiago were built by Volvo. Several operating companies of Transantiago bought 1,157 articulated buses B9SALF and 510 normal (12 meters long) buses B7RLE.

The articulated B9SALF Volvo bus has a capacity of approximately 160 passengers, four double doors, 100% low floor, a length of 18.5 meters and a width of 2.5 meters. The engine is on the left side between the first and second axles (i.e., behind the driver) and has 340 hp. (More technical information can be found in the technical specifications of the Volvo B9SALF.)

The Volvo B7RLE bus, with a capacity of approximately 80 passengers, has three double doors and low floor between the first and second doors. It has a length of 12 meters and a width of 2.5 meters. The engine is in the back of the vehicle and has 7,000 cm^{3}. (Additional technical information can be found in the technical specifications of the Volvo B7RLE.)

=== Switch to Electric Buses ===
An electric bus implementation program in Santiago, Chile, inspired by the buses in Bogotá, Colombia, began in 2014 through a partnership between the Chilean Ministry of Transport and two privately held companies, Enel X and BYD, an Italian electric company and a Chinese bus making manufacturer, respectively. This transportation design was created as a way to promote sustainable mobility in two ways. First, electric buses are substantially cheaper to operate, lowering the cost by 70% compared with typical diesel vehicles. In fact, a year-long pilot of this project found that the cost of operating the electric bus was only $0.10/kilometer compared to operating a diesel bus at $0.43/kilometer. Second, by using electric vehicles the city attempts to decrease the air pollution and noise pollution, improving the overall quality of life for residents and tourists visiting Santiago, while also making strides in the switch to an entire zero-emission public transportation system that the city has promised by 2040. In 2017, the first three entirely electric buses were deployed into the public transport system within the city. At the end of 2019, 400 electric buses were integrated into the current public transportation system, making history and placing Santiago as the city "with the second largest number of electric buses outside of China." Additionally, in the same year, the first 100% electric bus corridor in all of Latin America was finished and put into use in Santiago and includes 40 bus stops with multiple charging stations, allowing the electric buses to be fully charged in just 5 hours. The city of Santiago continues to replace the current diesel operated buses with fully electric buses and is creating even more electric bus corridors to recharge and store these buses when not in use. As of 2022, 2000 of the 7000 buses operating in the city of Santiago are electric.

== Problems and criticism ==
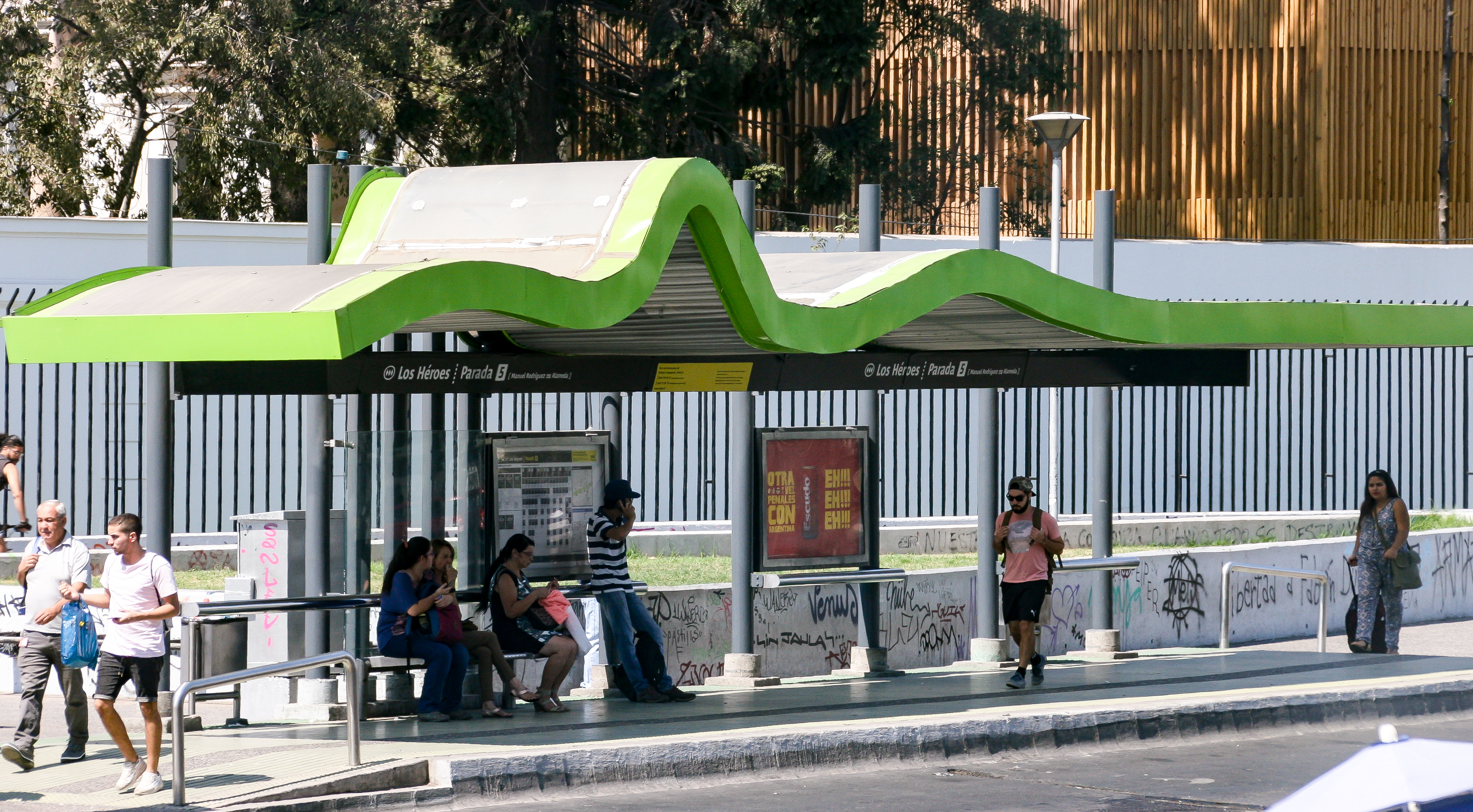
Transantiago characteristic bus stop, criticized because of its design and poor protection against rain and sun.

There were several problems with the design and initial implementation of the plan. Bus owners' contracts offered no incentive to improve service, as they received a fixed payment no matter how many passengers they transport. The centralized system for controlling frequency of buses is not working (the GPS system is non-operational), which was a main point in the original design. Passenger fare evasion was high (30% or more). Many people considered the service to be poor and were not willing to pay for it, while others were taking advantage of the situation. Routes were poorly defined and took little account of commuter's habits. One clear failing of the system was that there were no bus stops by many hospitals.

Although polls had shown the citizens of Santiago were overwhelmingly in favor of a new transport system, its implementation was heavily criticized for not meeting up to people's expectations. The system's first days in operation were chaotic at many of the bus stops, since there were not enough buses to cope with the demand. Additionally, many complained that the old bus routes were easier and faster, a claim confirmed to an extent in an investigation by El Mercurio, which found that most of the new routes took more time than the ones in the older system. Opposition politicians on both sides of the political spectrum—from Communist Party Secretary General Guillermo Teillier to right-wing UDI deputy Iván Moreira—criticized the implementation of the new system, calling it "improvised" and "unprofessional".

Support in Santiago for President Michelle Bachelet's government fell from 55.2% in February to 42.7% in March, 2007, after the Transantiago began operating, according to the monthly Adimark polls. Political analysts attributed the fall solely to the Transantiago, saying that there is no other possible cause for the dramatic fall in support. A poll taken by Benchmark agency, requested by the opposition, showed that 47% did not approve of the implementation of Transantiago, 64% labeled the implementation as "improvised", and 53% disapproved of the way President Bachelet had handled the situation. Many people have also blamed former president Ricardo Lagos, because it was his government that was responsible for the system's design.

One consequence of Transantiago is that the Metro system, which was to be a backbone of the system, was overwhelmed with over six users per square meter. The increase in usage was reported as having gone from 1,300,000 to 2,200,000. Metro president Blas Tomic was quoted as saying: "The capacity of metro has reached its limit" and the Colegio Médico (Chilean Medical Association) recommended that the elderly and users with medical conditions avoid the system.

The government defended the plan as necessary for a better transport system, adding it will improve as people become more used to it, adding everything is being done to improve it.

One of the main lessons learned from Transantiago's planning and implementation is the risky consequences of introducing the operational service for the entire scheme at once, without a transition period between the old system and the new scheme, or what has been called as a "Big Bang" approach. Several other Latin American cities, such as Curitiba, Brazil (the pioneering system in the world), Bogotá, Colombia, and Montevideo, Uruguay, implemented similar BRT schemes, but gradually, phasing in the scheme in several stages, allowing to make adjustments and hastily fixing glitches, without any serious disruption to transit services.

=== A year later ===
Once the dust settled and the numerous problems were ironed out, most users agree that the new system is an improvement. El Mercurio newspaper released some stats comparing the system a day before it made its debut (February 10, 2007) and a year after (February 10, 2008):

Item	February 10, 2007	February 10, 2008	±%
Fleet management centers	0	10	n/a
Operators	10	10	0%
Waiting times	+30 min.	4-8 min.	-87/-83%
Bip! Service Points	490	1,307	+167%
Bus-only lanes	11	15	+36%
Bus stops	3,113	8,200	+163%
Main buses	3,155	4,137	+31%
Pre-pay zones	0	100	n/a
Secondary buses	1,499	2,248	+50%
Segregated corridors	13	19	+46%
Main routes	90	140	+56%
Re-pavement	100 km	140 km	+40%
Secondary routes	133	177	+33%
Card charge points	540	1,957	+262%
Exclusive lanes	8	9	+13%
Metro trains	666	751	+13%

=== Not currently operating ===
- Security cameras
- Passenger counter
- Variable info panel
- GSM/GPRS system
- Panic button
- Fleet management software

=== Currently operating ===
- Clearing
- Bip! card
- Ticket validator
- GPS

== Bibliography ==
- Gschwender, Antonio (2005) Improving the urban public transport in developing countries: the design of a new integrated system in Santiago de Chile. 9th Conference of Competition and Ownership in Land Transport (Thredbo9), Lisbon, Portugal.
- Minteguiaga, Jorge (2006) Transantiago: redesigning public transport in Santiago, Chile. Public Transport International, 55, 6/2006, 16–19. ISSN 1016-796X.
