= Chilean peso =

Currency of Chile

peso chileno (Spanish)
- Series 2009

ISO 4217
- Code: CLP (numeric: 152)

Units of account
- Symbol: $

Denominations
- Banknotes: 1,000, 2,000, 5,000, 10,000, 20,000 pesos
- Coins: 10, 50, 100, 500 pesos

Demographics
- Date of introduction: 29 September 1975
- Replaced: Chilean escudo
- User(s): Chile

Issuance
- Central bank: Banco Central de Chile
- Website: www.bcentral.cl
- Mint: Casa de Moneda
- Website: www.casamoneda.cl

Valuation
- Value: Exchange Rate; 1 USD = 930 CLP ()

The peso is the currency of Chile. The current peso has circulated since 1975, with a previous version circulating between 1817 and 1960. Its symbol is defined as a letter S with either one or two vertical bars superimposed prefixing the amount, $ or; the single-bar symbol, available in most modern text systems, is almost always used. Both of these symbols are used by many currencies, most notably the United States dollar, and may be ambiguous without clarification, such as CLP$ or US$. The ISO 4217 code for the present peso is CLP. It was divided into 100 centavos until 31 May 1996, when the subdivision was formally eliminated (requiring payments to be made in whole pesos). As of July 2026, the Chilean peso traded at around CLP 930 per U.S. dollar.

The current peso was introduced on 29 September 1975 by decree 1,123, replacing the escudo at a rate of 1 peso for 1,000 escudos. This peso was subdivided into 100 centavos until 1984.

== Coins ==
Coins of the Chilean peso in circulation

In 1975, coins were introduced in denominations of 1, 5, 10, and 50 centavos and 1 peso. The 1, 5, and 10 centavo coins were very similar to the 10, 50, and 100 escudo coins they replaced. Since 1983, inflation has left the centavo coins obsolete. 5 and 10 peso coins were introduced in 1976, followed by 50 and 100 peso coins in 1981 and by a bi-metallic 500 peso coin in 2000. Coins currently in circulation are in denominations of 1, 5, 10, 50, 100, and 500 pesos; however, as of 2016 the value of the peso has depreciated enough that most retailers and others tend to use prices that are multiples of 10 pesos, ignoring smaller amounts. The 1 peso coin is rare. On 26 October 2017 the Mint stopped producing 1 and 5 peso coins, and started accepting those coins directly at the mint to exchange for larger denomination. On 1 November 2017 commercial entities began rounding off amounts for payment in cash, rounding down for amounts ending in 1 through 5 pesos, rounding up for amounts ending in 6 through 9 pesos. Electronic transactions and cheques are not affected. This change has affected various charities which had programs to accept donations at the cash register.

Shortly after the military dictatorship in Chile (1973–1990) ended, the obverse designs of the 5 and 10 peso coins were changed. Those coins had borne the image of a winged female figure wearing a classical robe and portrayed as if she had just broken a chain binding her two hands together (a length of chain could be seen hanging from each of her wrists); beside her appear the date of the coup d'état Roman numerals and the word LIBERTAD (Spanish for "liberty"). After the return of democracy, a design with the portrait of Bernardo O'Higgins was adopted.

In 2001, a newly redesigned 100-peso coin bearing the image of a Mapuche woman began to circulate. In February, 2010, it was discovered that on the 2008 series of the 50 peso coins the country name CHILE had been misspelled as CHIIE. The national mint said that it did not plan to recall the coins. Worth about US$0.09 each at the time, the faulty coins became collector's items.

== Banknotes ==
The discontinued $500 bill, together with Chilean notes currently in circulation

In 1976, banknotes were introduced in denominations of 5, 10, 50, and 100 pesos with the reverses of the two lowest denominations resembling those of the 5000- and 10,000-escudo notes they replaced. Inflation has since led to the issue of much higher denominations. Five-hundred-peso notes were introduced in May, 1977, followed by the 1000-peso (in June, 1978), 5000-peso (June, 1981), 10,000-peso (June, 1989), 2000-peso (December, 1997), and 20,000-peso (December, 1998) notes. The 5, 10, 50, 100, and 500-peso banknotes have been replaced by coins, leaving only the 1000, 2000, 5000, 10,000, and 20,000 peso notes in circulation. Redesigned versions of the four highest denominations were issued in 2009 and 2010. The popular new 1000-peso banknote was issued on 11 May 2011.

Since September 2004, the 2000-peso note has been issued only as a polymer banknote; the 5000-peso note began emission in polymer in September 2009; and the 1000-peso note was switched to polymer in May, 2011. This was the first time in Chilean history that a new family of banknotes was put into circulation for other cause than the effects of inflation. As of January 2012, only the 10,000 and 20,000 peso notes are still printed on cotton paper. All new notes have the same 70 mm (2.8 in) height, while their length varies in 7 mm (0.28 in) steps according to their face values: the shortest is the 1000-peso note and the longest is the 20,000-pesos. The new notes are substantially more difficult to falsify because of new security measures.

The design and production of the whole new family of banknotes was assigned to the Australian company Note Printing Australia Ltd for the 1000, 2000 and 5000 peso notes, and the Swedish company Crane AB for the 10,000 and 20,000 peso notes.

== In popular culture ==
Colloquial Chilean Spanish has informal names for some banknotes and coins. These include luca for a thousand pesos, quina for five hundred pesos (quinientos is Spanish for "five hundred"), gamba ("prawn") for one hundred pesos (or more recently 100,000 pesos) and "palo", for one million pesos. These names are old: For example, gamba and luca applied to 100 and 1000 escudos before 1975. The term gamba is a reference to the color of one hundred pesos banknote issued between 1933 and 1959.

Depending on context, a gamba might mean one hundred pesos or one hundred thousand pesos. For instance a new computer might be said to cost two gambas. This means two hundred thousand pesos. Less commonly, this applies to luca, taken to mean one million, usually referred to as palo.

The cover of the 2007 Velvet Revolver album Libertad features a stylized version of the angel from the Pinochet-era 10 pesos coin. Guitarist Slash, who personally chose the image, claimed he had no idea of the significance of it at the time.

== Value of the peso against the United States dollar ==
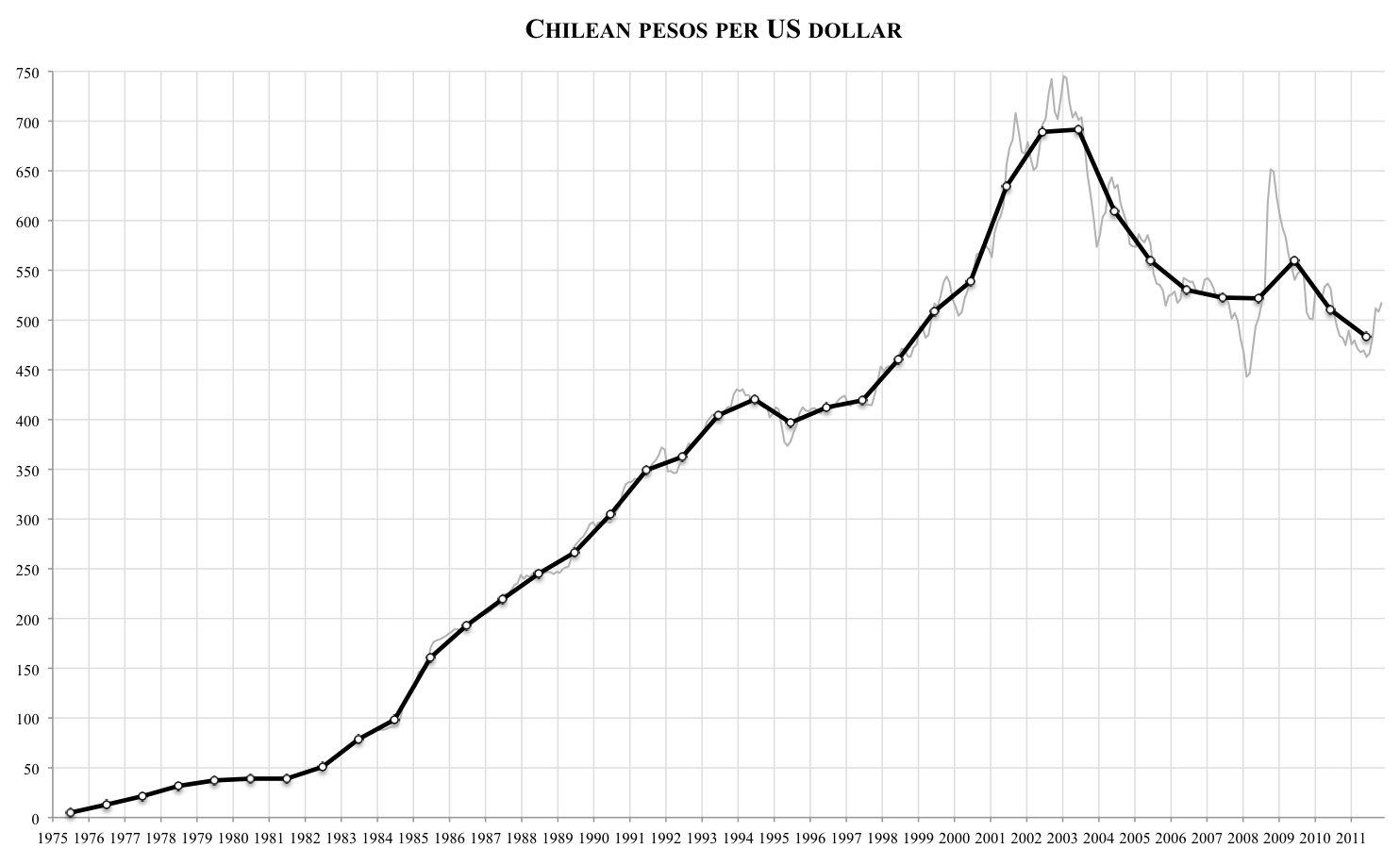
Current Chilean pesos per United States dollar (1975–2011). Note: The chart shows averages for the year. as well as monthly averages from 1984 onwards.

Average value of US$1
| Date | Chilean pesos |
|---|---|
| June 2024 | 927 |
| May 2024 | 918 |
| April 2024 | 961 |
| March 2024 | 968 |
| February 2024 | 964 |
| January 2024 | 908 |
| 6-month average | 941 |
| 2023 | 840 |
| 2022 | 874 |
| 2021 | 760 |
| 2020 | 793 |
| 2019 | 703 |
| 2018 | 641 |
| 2017 | 650 |
| 2016 | 677 |
| 2015 | 655 |
| 2010 | 511 |
| 2005 | 560 |
| 2000 | 539 |
| 1995 | 397 |
| 1990 | 305 |
| 1985 | 161 |

Between 1974 and 1979, the Chilean peso was allowed to float within a crawling band. From June 1979 to 1982 the peso was pegged to the United States dollar at a fixed exchange rate. In June 1982, during that year's economic crisis, the peso was devalued and different exchange rate regimes were used. In August 1984 the peso returned to a system of crawling bands, which were periodically adjusted to reflect differences between external and internal inflation.

Starting in September 1999, the Chilean peso was allowed to float freely against the United States dollar for the first time. Chile's Central Bank, however, reserved the right to intervene, which it did on two occasions to counter excessive depreciation: the first, in August and September 2001, coincided with Argentina's convertibility crisis and with the September 11 attacks in the United States. The second, in October 2002, was during Brazil's presidential election.

During the first months of the Presidency of Gabriel Boric, the US dollar began to have a strong appreciation against the Chilean peso. Among the reasons was the very strong drop in the raw material of copper, in addition to political and economic instability due to the rise of the cost of living reaching its highest level in 20 years of 2-digit inflation of 14.1%. Another factor was uncertainty about the arrival of the 2022 Chilean constitutional referendum that would take place a few months later between approval and rejection, and the discouraging economic figures in China that led the dollar to exceed the figure of 1000 pesos for the first time in its history, reaching a price of more than 1050 pesos per dollar. After that, the Central Bank of Chile carried out its largest exchange intervention in the market, intervening on Thursday, July 14, 2022, for an amount of up to US$25,000 million starting on 18 July 2022 and until 30 September 2022.

During 2023, the dollar has had a strong devaluation that was quoted at approximately 780 Pesos per dollar. On 28 July 2023, the Central Bank of Chile announced the strongest drop since 2009 in the monetary policy rate with a drop substantial 100 basic points from 11.25% to 10.25%, which led the dollar to have a strong rise as there began to be greater access to loans and as time deposits were not profitable, they led to reaching 860 pesos per dollar.

Current CLP exchange rates
| From Google Finance: | AUD CAD CHF CNY EUR GBP HKD JPY USD INR BRL ARS |
| From Yahoo! Finance: | AUD CAD CHF CNY EUR GBP HKD JPY USD INR BRL ARS |
| From XE.com: | AUD CAD CHF CNY EUR GBP HKD JPY USD INR BRL ARS |
| From OANDA: | AUD CAD CHF CNY EUR GBP HKD JPY USD INR BRL ARS |

== See also ==
- Economy of Chile
- Unidad de Fomento — inflation indexing of the Peso used in many contracts in Chile
- Argentine peso
- Uruguayan peso

== Notes ==
| Preceded by: Chilean escudo Ratio: 1 peso = 1000 escudos | Currency of Chile; 1975 – | Succeeded by: Current |
